= Abortion in Florida =

Abortion in Florida is generally illegal after six weeks from the woman's last menstrual period, This law came into effect in May 2024, being approved by Republican Governor Ron DeSantis following its passage in the Florida House of Representatives and the Florida Senate, with only Republican state legislators supporting. Additionally, pregnant women are generally required to make two visits to a medical facility 24 hours apart to be able to obtain an abortion, in a law approved by Republican Governor Rick Scott in 2015.

The exceptions to the 6 week gestational age (since last menstrual period) abortion ban are as follows: (1) within 15 weeks gestational age, if the woman can give evidence from medical or official documentation that the pregnancy is due to rape, incest, or human trafficking; (2) before the third trimester, if two doctors certify a fatal fetal abnormality; and (3) at any time, with doctor(s)' certification, "to save the pregnant woman's life or avert a serious risk of substantial and irreversible physical impairment of a major bodily function of the pregnant woman other than a psychological condition". The exceptions to the 24-hour waiting period require evidence from medical or official documentation that the pregnancy is due to rape, incest, domestic violence or human trafficking.

From 1868 to 1972, abortion law in Florida stated that abortion was illegal unless "necessary to preserve the life of such mother", but the Supreme Court of Florida in 1972 ruled that this law was unconstitutionally vague, leading to its repeal. In 1973, the United States Supreme Court decided Roe v. Wade, enshrining abortion as a constitutional right across the United States, until the United States Supreme Court in 2022 decided during Dobbs v. Jackson Women's Health Organization to overturn Roe v. Wade, returning the power to regulate abortion to the state legislatures.

In 1989, the Supreme Court of Florida ruled that the Constitution of Florida's provision for the "right to be let alone and free from governmental intrusion into his private life" extended to a woman's choice to have an abortion. In April 2024, the Supreme Court of Florida overturned its 1989 decision, instead ruling that the Constitution of Florida does not confer a right to abortion, allowing the 15-week abortion ban to remain in effect. The Court's decision also allowed an embryonic heartbeat ban to take effect 30 days after the ruling.

In a simultaneous opinion, the Supreme Court also approved Florida Amendment 4 to proceed to the November 2024 ballot, which would have enshrined a constitutional right to abortion before fetal viability, and after viability when necessary to protect the patient's health as determined by their healthcare provider. The amendment failed to reach the 60% threshold needed to pass, garnering 57% of the vote.

== History ==
=== 1868–1972 ===
Florida's first abortion law was implemented in 1868, lasting until 1972; it stated:

Abortion: Every person who shall administer to any woman pregnant with a quick child any medicine, drug or substance whatever, or shall use or employ any instrument or other means, with intent thereby to destroy such child, unless the same shall have been necessary to preserve the life of such mother, or shall have been advised by two physicians to be necessary for such purpose, shall, in case the death of such child or of such mother be thereby produced, be deemed guilty of manslaughter.

Performing abortion; punishment: Whoever with intent to procure miscarriage of any woman unlawfully administers to her, or advises or prescribes for her, or causes to be taken by her, any poison, drug, medicine or other noxious thing, or unlawfully uses any instrument or other means whatever with the like intent, or with intent aids or assists therein, shall, if the woman does riot die in consequence thereof, be punished by imprisonment in the state prison not exceeding seven years, or by fine not exceeding one thousand dollars.

From 1868 to 1972, there were only seven legal cases regarding abortion reported from Florida's appellate courts; an attempt to render the abortion law unconstitutional was rejected in 1963 in Carter v. State. In February 1972, during the case State v. Barquet, the Florida Supreme Court declared that the abortion law was unconstitutional, due to the phrase "unless the same shall have been necessary to preserve the life of such mother" being too vague, with the court's opinion stating that the "duty, and judgment of a physician, the necessity and welfare of the patient, and the rights of both, cannot be subjected to indefinite, uncertain, vague, or unreasonable legislation." Hence, the abortion law was repealed that year.

In April 1972, the Florida legislature implemented a new abortion law, built upon the 1962 Model Penal Code of the American Law Institute. Parts of the law are as follows:

It shall be unlawful to terminate the pregnancy of a human being unless the pregnancy is terminated in an approved facility by a physician who certifies in writing that: (a) To a reasonable degree of medical certainty the continuation of the pregnancy would substantially impair the life or health of the female; (b) There is substantial risk that the continuation of the pregnancy would result in the birth of a child with a serious physical or mental defect; or (c) There is reasonable cause to believe that the pregnancy resulted from rape or incest.

=== 1973–2022 ===
In January 1973, the Supreme Court of the United States (SCOTUS) decided the case of Roe v. Wade, recognizing abortion as a constitutional right under federal law, thus affecting Florida. In its opinion, SCOTUS created the trimester framework to regulate abortion. During the first trimester, when it was believed that the procedure as safe or safer than childbirth, SCOTUS ruled that a state government could place no restrictions on women's ability to choose to abort pregnancies other than imposing minimal medical safeguards, such as requiring abortions to be performed by licensed doctors. From the second trimester on, SCOTUS ruled that evidence of increasing risks to the pregnant woman's health gave states a compelling interest that allowed them to enact medical regulations on abortion procedures so long as they were reasonable and "narrowly tailored" to protecting mothers' health. From the third trimester on—the point at which a fetus became viable under the medical technology available in the early 1970s—SCOTUS ruled that a state's interest in protecting prenatal life became so compelling that it could legally prohibit all abortions except where necessary to protect the mother's life or health.

In 1989, the Supreme Court of Florida ruled in the case of In re: TW that the Florida law, requiring female minors to obtain parental consent in order to obtain an abortion, had violated the Florida Constitution's provision that citizens had the "right to be let alone and free from governmental intrusion into his private life". The Supreme Court of Florida stated that "Florida's privacy provision is clearly implicated in a woman's decision of whether or not to continue her pregnancy ... We can conceive of few more personal or private decisions concerning one's body that one can make in a lifetime"; this applied to minors because the Florida Constitution's privacy clause extended to "every natural person".

Florida was one of ten states in 2007 to have a customary informed consent provision for abortions. Abortion providers were required to show women ultrasounds of their fetus before allowing them to have an abortion. In 2013, the Targeted Regulation of Abortion Providers (TRAP) law applied to medically induced abortions as well.

The Republican-controlled Florida legislature in April 2015 passed a bill (HB 633) to require pregnant women to make two visits to a medical facility 24 hours apart to be able to obtain an abortion; in the Florida House of Representatives, most of the House Republicans supported the bill, while most of the House Democrats opposed the bill; in the Florida Senate, only House Republicans supported the bill, and only Senate Democrats opposed the bill. Florida's Republican Governor Rick Scott signed the bill into law in June 2015, to take effect in July 2015. Exceptions for the 24-hour waiting period were allowed if the women could produce medical or official documentation that the pregnancy is due to rape, incest, domestic violence or human trafficking.

The 24-hour waiting period law was challenged in the courts by the American Civil Liberties Union of Florida and the Center for Reproductive Rights, leading to Leon County Chief Circuit Judge Charles Francis blocking the law just before it took effect, as "the court has no evidence in front of it" to determine that the law "is not an additional burden on a woman's right to privacy". The lower court's decision was overturned in February 2016 by the Florida First District Court of Appeal, which lifted the block on the law. The Supreme Court of Florida in April 2016 reinstated the temporary block of the law while considering the case. In February 2017, the Supreme Court of Florida ruled (in the case of Gainesville Woman Care, LLC v. State) that the law was "presumptively unconstitutional", as "the state impermissibly interferes with women's fundamental right of privacy", and the state thus far "has presented no evidence of a compelling state interest"; however this ruling did not result in the end of the legal case, which was sent back to lower courts.

=== 2022–present ===
The United States Supreme Court in December 2021 heard oral arguments in the case Dobbs v. Jackson Women's Health Organization, where the justices seemed supportive of taking action against Roe v. Wade. Predicting that the United States Supreme Court would soon rule against Roe v. Wade, several states, including Florida, Idaho and Oklahoma, began taking steps to implement legislation that would restrict abortions.

With Republicans still controlling the Florida legislature, the Reducing Fetal and Infant Mortality bill (HB 5) was passed by the Florida House of Representatives in February 2022, then passed by the Florida Senate in March 2022, both with only Republican state legislators supporting and only Democratic state legislators opposing, and then signed into law by Florida's Republican Governor Ron DeSantis in April 2022. The law redefined "gestation" to be "calculated from the first day of the pregnant woman's last menstrual period", and then stated that abortion would be illegal (with exceptions) in Florida if a "physician determines the gestational age of the fetus is more than 15 weeks". Exceptions for the abortion ban were allowed for instances to "save the pregnant woman's life", or "avert a serious risk of substantial and irreversible physical impairment of a major bodily function" of the pregnant woman, or if the fetus has a "fatal fetal abnormality".

In April 2022, the case Gainesville Woman Care, LLC v. State was resolved by Leon County Circuit Court Judge Angela Dempsey, that ruled as constitutional the Florida law requiring pregnant women to wait 24 hours after their initial medical consultation to be able to obtain an abortion.

In June 2022, the United States Supreme Court ruled in Dobbs v. Jackson Women's Health Organization, overturning both Roe v. Wade and Planned Parenthood v. Casey, and hence returning the power to regulate abortion to state legislatures.

HB 5 faced legal scrutiny as a state judge moved to block enforcement of the law on July 5, 2022, ruling that the Florida Constitution guaranteed a right to privacy rendered the law unconstitutional. The State of Florida appealed the decision to the Supreme Court of Florida, thereby keeping the law in place while the case was being decided. On June 1, 2022, The American Civil Liberties Union (ACLU), the ACLU of Florida, the Center for Reproductive Rights, Planned Parenthood Federation of America, and the law firm Jenner & Block filed Planned Parenthood of Southwest and Central Florida, et al. v. State of Florida, et al., a lawsuit on behalf of Florida health care providers. On January 23, 2023, the Supreme Court of Florida accepted a request to hear the petitioner's arguments against House Bill 5 (HB 5).

The Heartbeat Protection Act (SB 300) was passed by the Florida Senate, then passed by the Florida House of Representatives, and then signed into law by Governor Ron DeSantis, all in April 2023. The 2023 bill states that abortion would be illegal (with exceptions) in Florida if a "physician determines the gestational age of the fetus is more than 6 weeks". Many women do not yet know that they are pregnant when the fetus is at a gestational age of 6 weeks since the woman's last menstrual period.

There are four exceptions to the six-week gestational age abortion ban.

1. "At the time the woman schedules or arrives for her appointment to obtain the abortion", if she can give evidence using "restraining order, police report, medical record, or other court order or documentation" that her pregnancy is due to "rape, incest, or human trafficking", then an abortion can be legally carried out up to a gestational age of 15 weeks.
2. Before the third trimester, two doctors "certify in writing that, in reasonable medical judgment, the fetus has a fatal fetal abnormality".
3. Two doctors "certify in writing that, in reasonable medical judgment", that abortion "is necessary to save the pregnant woman's life or avert a serious risk of substantial and irreversible physical impairment of a major bodily function of the pregnant woman other than a psychological condition."
4. One doctor "certifies in writing that, in reasonable medical judgment, there is a medical necessity for legitimate emergency medical procedures" to carry out the abortion "to save the pregnant woman's life or avert a serious risk of substantial and irreversible physical impairment of a major bodily function of the pregnant woman other than a psychological condition, and another physician is not available for consultation.

HB 5 was upheld by the Florida Supreme Court, on April 1, 2024, allowing the 15-week abortion ban to remain in effect, and the 6-week abortion ban to take effect 30 days after the ruling. The Florida Supreme Court also overturned its precedent, that ruled that Article 1, Section 23 of the Florida Constitution protected a woman's right to an abortion

Florida's abortion ban, from six weeks since the pregnant women's last menstrual period, with exceptions, took effect on May 1, 2024. At the time of the ban taking effect, the closest state with laxer abortion restrictions is North Carolina, which allows abortions up to 12 weeks, but has a 72-hour waiting period; for abortions after 12 weeks, the next closest states would be Virginia or Illinois.

==== Health crises ====
In 2022, two women in Florida, both of whom had been undergoing fertility treatment, experienced pre-viability preterm prelabor rupture of membranes (PPROM) in their second trimesters. The standard of care in such situations is to induce labor or surgically end the pregnancy; according to The Washington Post, pre-Dobbs, physicians in all states would have offered such a procedure, but both women were sent home, and both developed serious complications, including ones that threatened their future fertility. State Senator Erin Grall, who sponsored both HB5 and SB300, accused physicians of intentionally misinterpreting the bill in such cases for political reasons.

=== Clinic history ===
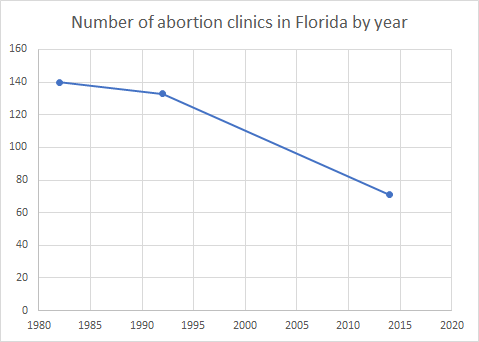
Number of abortion clinics in Florida by year

Byllye Avery opened the first abortion clinic in Florida in Gainesville. The clinic had blue shag carpets, which for many women at that time gave them comfort as it showed the abortion would not be a bloody affair, requiring tiled, easy-to-clean floors. Between 1982 and 1992, the number of abortion clinics in the state decreased by 7, going from 140 in 1982 to 133 in 1992. In 2017, there were 65 abortion clinics in the state, and over 73% of the counties in the state do not have an abortion clinic. In 2014, 20% of women in the state aged 15–44 lived in a county without an abortion clinic. In 2017, there were 22 Planned Parenthood clinics, of which 13 offered abortion services. At the time, Florida had 4,404,228 women aged 15–49.

== Statistics ==
In the period between 1972 and 1974, the state had an illegal abortion mortality rate per million women aged 15 – 44 of between 0.1 and 0.9. In 1990, 1,389,000 women in the state faced the risk of an unintended pregnancy. The highest number of legally induced abortions by the state in the years 2000, 2001, and 2003 occurred in New York City with 94,466; 91,792; and 90,820 successful abortions, respectively, followed by Florida with 88,563; 85,589; and 88,247 respectively and Texas with 76,121; 77,409 and 79,166 respectively. In 2014, a poll conducted by the Pew Research Center showed that 56% of the population wanted abortion to remain legal and 38% disagreed with this stance. In 2017, the state had an infant mortality rate of 6.1 deaths per 1,000 live births.

In the year following the overturn of Roe v. Wade, Florida saw an 48.2% increase in abortions, primarily driven by patients traveling from states with abortion bans.

Number of reported abortions, abortion rate, and percentage change in rate by geographic region and state in 1992, 1995, and 1996
Census division and state	Number			Rate			% change 1992–1996
Census division and state	1992	1995	1996	1992	1995	1996	% change 1992–1996
South Atlantic	269,200	261,990	263,600	25.9	24.6	24.7	–5
Delaware	5,730	5,790	4,090	35.2	34.4	24.1	–32
District of Columbia	21,320	21,090	20,790	138.4	151.7	154.5	12
Florida	84,680	87,500	94,050	30	30	32	7
Georgia	39,680	36,940	37,320	24	21.2	21.1	–12
Maryland	31,260	30,520	31,310	26.4	25.6	26.3	0
North Carolina	36,180	34,600	33,550	22.4	21	20.2	–10
South Carolina	12,190	11,020	9,940	14.2	12.9	11.6	–19
Virginia	35,020	31,480	29,940	22.7	20	18.9	–16
West Virginia	3,140	3,050	2,610	7.7	7.6	6.6	–14

Number, rate, and ratio of reported abortions, by reporting area of residence and occurrence and by percentage of abortions obtained by out-of-state residents, US CDC estimates
Location	Residence			Occurrence			% obtained by out-of-state residents	Year	Ref
Location	No.	Rate^	Ratio^^	No.	Rate^	Ratio^^	% obtained by out-of-state residents	Year	Ref
Florida				84,680	30			1992	
Florida				87,500	30			1995	
Florida				94,050	32			1996	
Florida	--	--	--	72,107	19.6	328	--	2014	
Florida	--	--	--	69,770	18.5	310	--	2016	
^number of abortions per 1,000 women aged 15–44; ^^number of abortions per 1,000 live births

== Abortion-related prosecutions ==
In February 2009, Dr. Pierre Jean-Jacques Renelique had his license revoked by the Florida Medical Board. Renelique also had a criminal investigation against him conducted by the Florida Attorney regarding a 2006 incident where it was alleged that a teenage girl gave birth during an abortion procedure, and staff at his clinic disposed of the baby in a garbage bag in an attempt to cover up the events.

== Abortion rights views and activities ==
=== Protests ===
#StopTheBans was created in response to six states passing legislation in early 2019 that would almost completely outlaw abortion. Advocates for reproductive rights wanted to protest this activity as other state legislatures started to consider similar bans as part of a move to try to overturn Roe v. Wade. At least one protest as part of #StopTheBans took place in the state. The Supreme Court overturned Roe v. Wade in Dobbs v. Jackson Women's Health Organization, No. 19-1392, 597 U.S. ___ (2022) later in 2022.

On June 10, 2022, a synagogue in Boynton Beach filed a lawsuit against the state of Florida regarding their 15-week abortion ban, stating that the ban violated religious freedom of Jews.

Following the overturn of Roe v. Wade on June 24, 2022, abortion rights protests were held outside the Florida State Capitol in Tallahassee, the Wynwood neighborhood of Miami, Tampa, and St. Petersburg.

In Tallahassee, Florida in March and April 2023, several abortion rights protests were held at the Florida State Capitol in opposition to the proposed six-week abortion ban. On April 3, 13 abortion rights protesters including two state senators were arrested following a peaceful protest outside City Hall. On May 3, 14 people were arrested following a sit-in in Ron DeSantis' office to protest Florida's six-week abortion ban, anti-LGBTQ legislation and anti-immigrant legislation.

=== Amendment 4 ===
By December 2023, Floridians Protecting Freedom had gathered over 1 million signatures for their petition to place abortion rights on the ballot in the November 2024 election.

On April 13, 2024, over 1,000 abortion rights protesters rallied and marched in Orlando, Florida to kick off the campaign in support of 2024 Florida Amendment 4.

In August 2024, Florida resident and former president Donald Trump said "I'm going to be voting that we need more than six weeks," though the next day he announced he would vote against the amendment.

==== Timeline of the "Yes on 4" Movement ====
===== 2021 =====
- Inception: The "Yes on 4" movement begins as a response to increasing restrictions on reproductive rights in Florida. Activists decide to propose a constitutional amendment to protect these rights.

===== 2022 =====
- Gathering Support:
  - Spring: Advocates start collecting signatures to put the amendment on the ballot. They partner with various reproductive health organizations and community groups.
  - Public Events: Rallies and informational sessions are held to educate voters about the importance of protecting reproductive rights.

===== 2023 =====
- Signature Submission:
  - January: The movement submits enough signatures to qualify for the November ballot. They need a certain number of verified signatures from registered voters.
- Public Support:
  - Polls: Surveys show that a majority of Floridians support the amendment. Many people express concern about recent laws limiting access to abortion.

===== 2024 =====
- Campaigning Intensifies:
  - Spring-Summer: The campaign ramps up, with ads, community outreach, and endorsements from influential figures and organizations in the reproductive health field.
- Election Day:
  - November 5: The amendment is on the ballot, and voters have the chance to decide on it. The campaign hopes to mobilize voters to support reproductive rights.

==== Goals of the "Yes on 4" Movement ====
- Protect Reproductive Rights: The main aim is to ensure that individuals can make personal decisions about their reproductive health, including the right to access abortion without excessive restrictions.

Secure Rights in the Constitution: By passing this amendment, the movement wants to make sure that reproductive rights are protected at the state level, preventing future laws from taking those rights away.

==== Legal challenges involving Amendment 4 ====
Florida Attorney General Ashley Moody, a Republican, has opposed the ballot initiative since October 2023, when she asked the Florida Supreme Court to analyze the ballot initiative. In November 2023, Moody urged the Florida Supreme Court to block the ballot initiative, as she questioned the definition of "viability" and argued that the ballot initiative will "lay ticking time bombs that will enable abortion proponents later to argue that the amendment has a much broader meaning than voters would ever have thought".

The Florida Supreme Court in April 2024 approved Florida Amendment 4 to be placed on the ballot for voting in November 2024, because it adequately satisfied the requirements set. Despite Florida Attorney General Ashley Moody arguing that some of the language was deceptive, the Florida Supreme Court instead ruled that "it cannot be said that the ballot summary will mislead voters regarding the actual text of the proposed amendment." The Florida Supreme Court further stated that "the broad sweep of this proposed amendment is obvious in the language of the summary. Denying this requires a flight from reality", while ruling that there is "no basis for concluding that the proposed amendment is facially invalid under the United States Constitution."

In October 2024, the Florida Department of Health sent cease and desist notices to television stations demanding the retraction of a campaign advertisement for Amendment 4, alleging that it contained false statements regarding the availability of abortions to protect the health of the patient under current state law. It went on to claim that the ad "threatens or impairs" the health of Florida residents by encouraging them to delay their abortion or pursue one out-of-state, therefore constituting a "sanitary nuisance" punishable as a criminal misdemeanor under state law. The threat was criticized by Floridians Protecting Freedom—the organization who produced the ad—which stated that it was an "unconstitutional state action", and "a textbook example of government coercion that violates the First Amendment." FCC chairwoman Jessica Rosenworcel also responded, stating that "threats against broadcast stations for airing content that conflicts with the government's views are dangerous and undermine the fundamental principle of free speech." On October 16, Floridians Protecting Freedom filed suit in the U.S. District Court for the Northern District of Florida, aiming to prevent the state from acting on its threat to criminally charge the stations. The suit names the state's surgeon general, Joseph Ladapo, and its former general counsel, John Wilson. The same day, opponents of the amendment filed suit in Florida's Ninth Judicial Circuit to invalidate the amendment, drawing on a DeSantis administration report released the previous week that claimed there weren't enough valid signatures; the deadline for challenging signatures had long since passed. By that point, polls indicated more Floridians supported the amendment than opposed it. On October 17, chief judge of the Northern District Mark Walker issued a 12-day restraining order directing Ladapo to stop intimidating local stations that were running the ad. Walker wrote, "To keep it simple for the State of Florida: it's the First Amendment, stupid."

== Anti-abortion views and activities ==
=== Activities ===
In the United States, some states issue specialty license plates that have an anti-abortion theme. Choose Life, an advocacy group founded in 1997, was successful in securing an anti-abortion automobile tag in Florida. Subsequently, the organization has been actively helping groups in other states pursue "Choose Life" license plates.

On August 22, 2022, a clinic in Jacksonville notified the FBI after 165 anti-abortion protesters blocked the entrance to their clinic in violation of the FACE Act.

=== Violence ===
1982 saw a surge in attacks on abortion clinics in the United States, with at least four arson attacks and one bombing. One attack occurred in Illinois and one in Virginia, and two occurred in Florida. These five attacks caused over US$1.1 million in damage. On December 25, 1984, an abortion clinic and two physicians' offices in Pensacola, Florida, were bombed in the early morning of Christmas Day by a quartet of young people, Matt Goldsby, Jimmy Simmons, Kathy Simmons and Kaye Wigginn, who later called the bombings "a gift to Jesus on his birthday". The bombers were caught, convicted and eventually served time in prison for the bombing.

On March 26, 1986, six anti-abortion activists, including John Burt and Joan Andrews, were arrested after invading an abortion clinic in Pensacola, Florida, causing property damage and injuring two women (a clinic manager and a member of the local NOW chapter). Burt was convicted of attempted burglary of an occupied building, assault, battery, and resisting arrest without violence and was sentenced to 141 days already served in jail and four years of probation. His 18-year-old daughter, Sarah Burt, who also took part in the invasion, was sentenced to 15 days in jail (with credit for two days already served) and three years of probation. Andrews refused to pledge not to carry out such actions in the future and was convicted of burglary, criminal mischief, and resisting arrest without violence. She was sentenced to five years in prison, which she spent largely in self-imposed isolation, refusing a mattress and all medical care.

Between 1993 and 2015, 11 people were killed at American abortion clinics. On March 10, 1993, Dr. David Gunn of Pensacola, Florida, was fatally shot during a protest. He had been the subject of wanted-style posters distributed by Operation Rescue in the summer of 1992. Michael F. Griffin was found guilty of Gunn's murder and was sentenced to life in prison. Gunn was the first doctor in the United States to be killed by anti-abortion activists.

On July 29, 1994, Dr. John Britton and James Barrett, a clinic escort, were both shot to death outside the Ladies Center in Pensacola. June Barrett was injured in the shooting. Paul Jennings Hill was charged with the killings, received a death sentence, and was executed on September 3, 2003. The clinic in Pensacola was bombed in 1984 and was also in 2012. Paul Jennings Hill said of his conviction, "I believe in the short and long term, more and more people will act on the principles for which I stand. [...] I'm willing and I feel very honored that they are most likely going to kill me for what I did."

In 1998, there were six arson attacks, four bombings, one murder, and 19 acid attacks at abortion clinics in the United States. The butyric acid attacks took place between May and July in Florida, Louisiana, and Texas. An attack took place at an abortion clinic in Miami, Florida, on May 16, 1998. A few days later, on May 21, 1998, three people were injured when acid was poured at the entrances of five abortion clinics in Miami. On July 4, 2005, a clinic in West Palm Beach, Florida, was the target of a probable arson.

On January 1, 2012, Bobby Joe Rogers, 41, firebombed the American Family Planning Clinic in Pensacola, Florida, with a Molotov cocktail; the fire gutted the building. Rogers told investigators that he was motivated to commit the crime by his opposition to abortion and that what more directly prompted the act was seeing a patient enter the clinic during one of the frequent anti-abortion protests there. The clinic had previously been bombed at Christmas in 1984 and was the site of the murder of Dr. John Britton and James Barrett in 1994. The Army of God published a "Defensive Action Statement" signed by more than two dozen supporters of Hill, saying that "whatever force is legitimate to defend the life of a born child is legitimate to defend the life of an unborn child... if in fact Paul Hill did kill or wound abortion care provider John Britton and clinic assistants James Barrett and Mrs. Barrett, his actions are morally justified if they were necessary for the purpose of defending innocent human life". The organization embraces its description as terrorist.

On October 10, 2020, a man threw multiple Molotov cocktails at a Planned Parenthood clinic in Fort Myers, Florida. He was later convicted of arson, using an incendiary device and criminal mischief with property damage, sentenced to one year in prison and seven years probation.
