= Trosch =

Trosch can refer to:

- David Trosch (1935–2012), American clergyman and author
- Gene Trosch (born 1945), American football player
- Wilbur Trosch (1938–2014), American basketball player and coach
