= Anti-abortion violence =

Violence against providers of abortion services

Anti-abortion violence is violence committed against individuals and organizations that perform abortions or provide abortion counseling. Incidents of violence have included destruction of property, including vandalism; crimes against people, including kidnapping, stalking, assault, attempted murder, and murder; and crimes affecting both people and property, as well as arson and terrorism, such as bombings.

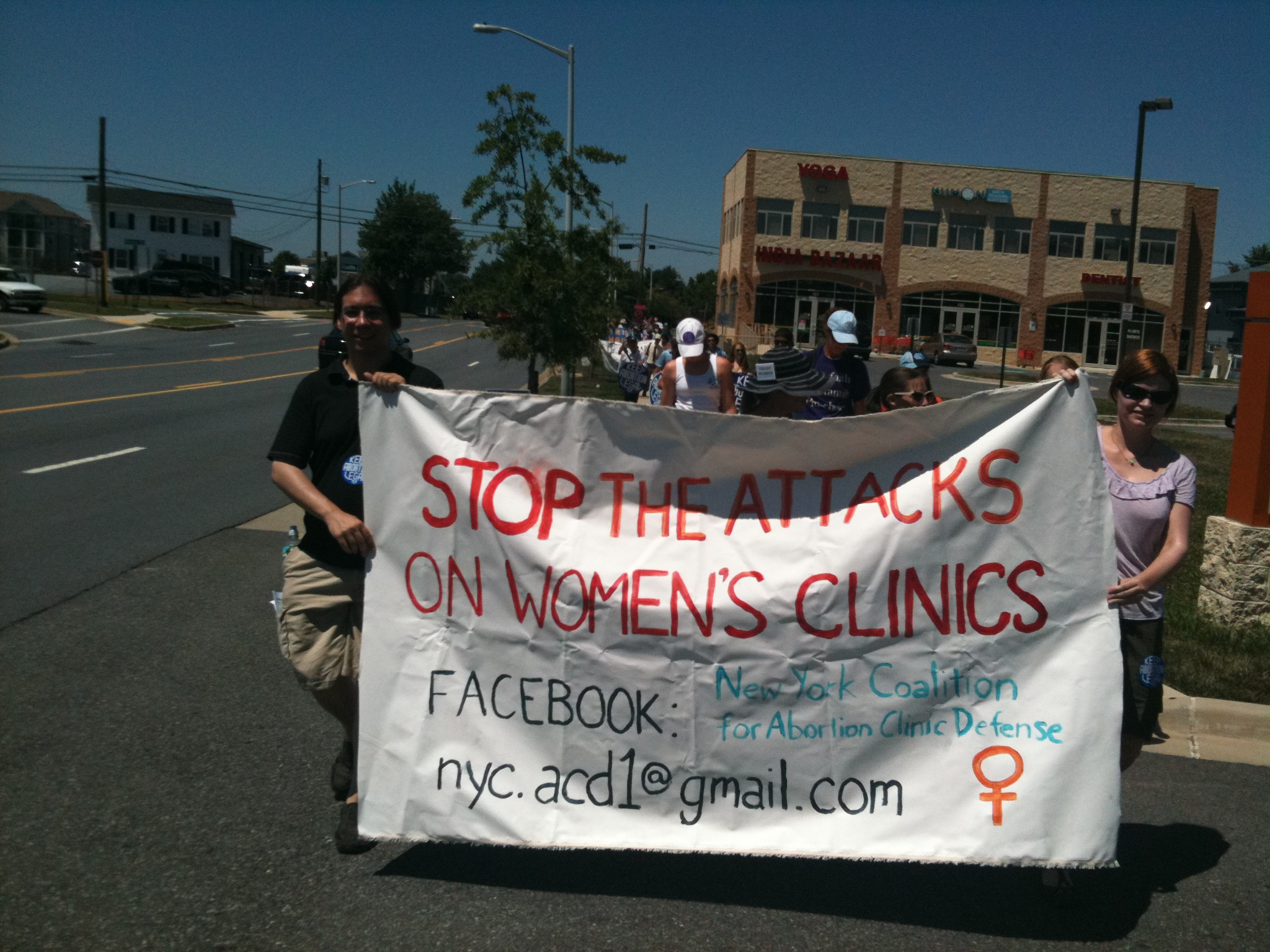
Protest banner against anti-abortion violence

Anti-abortion extremists are considered a current domestic terrorist threat by the United States Department of Justice. Most documented incidents have occurred in the United States, though they have also occurred in Australia, Canada, and New Zealand. G. Davidson Smith of Canadian Security Intelligence Service defined anti-abortion violence as single-issue terrorism. A study of 1982–87 violence considered the incidents "limited political" or "sub-revolutionary" terrorism.

== Background ==
Anti-abortion violence is specifically directed towards people who or places which provide abortion. It is recognized as "single-issue terrorism". Incidents include vandalism, arson, and bombings of abortion clinics, such as those committed by Eric Rudolph (1996–98), and murders or attempted murders of physicians and clinic staff, as committed by James Kopp (1998), Paul Jennings Hill (1994), Scott Roeder (2009), Michael F. Griffin (1993), and Peter James Knight (2001).

Those who engage in or support such actions defend the use of force with claims of justifiable homicide or defense of others in the interest of protecting the life of the fetus. David C. Nice, of the University of Georgia, describes support for anti-abortion violence as being associated with weaker social controls, higher abortion rates, and greater acceptance of violence toward women. Numerous organizations have also recognized anti-abortion extremism as a form of Christian terrorism. Some adherents of the movement also follow the Anti-LGBTQ and conservatism movements.

Since the 1970s in the United States, there have been at least 13 murders, 42 bombings, 200 arsons, and 531 assaults against abortion providers and patients. At least one murder occurred in Australia, as well as several attempted murders in Canada. There were 1,793 abortion providers in the United States in 2008, as well as 197 abortion providers in Canada in 2001. The National Abortion Federation reported between 1,356 and 13,415 incidents of picketing at United States providers each year from 1995 to 2014.

The Federal Freedom of Access to Clinic Entrances Act was passed in 1994 to protect reproductive health service facilities and their staff and patients from violent threats, assault, vandalism, and blockade. The law (18 U.S.C. sec. 248) also provides the same level of legal protection to all pregnancy-related medical clinics, including anti-abortion counseling centers; it also applies to use of threatening tactics directed towards churches and places of worship. State, provincial, and local governments have also passed similar laws designed to afford legal protection of access to abortion in the United States and Canada.

== By country ==
=== Australia ===
- July 16, 2001: Peter James Knight attacked a clinic in Melbourne, Australia, shooting and killing the security guard, Steven Rogers. Knight brought ropes and gags into the clinic along with 16 litres of kerosene, intending to burn all 15 staff and 26 patients to death. Knight was charged and was sentenced to life in prison on November 19, 2002.
- January 6, 2009: A firebombing using Molotov cocktails was attempted at a medical clinic in Mosman Park, Western Australia. Damage was minimal and only resulted in smashed windows and blackened external walls. Police believed graffiti saying "baby killers" on the building was related to the attack, however, the medical clinic did not actually offer abortion services.

=== Canada ===
==== Attempted murder ====
Violence has also occurred in Canada, where at least three doctors have been attacked to date. The physicians were part of a pattern of attacks, which targeted providers in Canada and upstate New York (including the fatal shooting of Barnett Slepian of New York). All victims were shot, or shot at, in their homes with a rifle, at dusk or in the morning, in late October or early November over a multi-year period. There is speculation that the timing of the shootings is related to the Canadian observance of Remembrance Day.

A joint Canadian-FBI task force investigating the shootings was formed in December 1997—three years after the first attack. An official of the Hamilton-Wentworth Regional Police complained that the Canadian Government was not adequately financing the investigation. He said he requested more funds in July that would raise its budget to $250,000. Federal officials rejected the request on October 15, a week before Slepian was killed. (Note: Rhode, David. Sniper attacks on doctors create climate of fear in Canada, New York Times, October 29, 1998. Retrieved August 29, 2011.)

In 2001, James Kopp, an American citizen and resident was charged with the murder of Slepian and the attempted murder of Short; some speculate that Kopp was responsible for the other shootings. (Note: Robinson, B.A., Ontario Consultants on Religious Tolerance (November 9, 2004), "Violence & Harassment at U.S. Abortion Clinics". Retrieved April 13, 2006.) (Note: National Abortion Federation (2006), "Clinic Violence: History of Violence". Retrieved April 13, 2006.)

- November 8, 1994: In 1994, a sniper fired two bullets into the home of Garson Romalis, a gynaecologist of Vancouver, British Columbia who was eating breakfast. One hit his thigh, destroyed some of his muscles, broke his femur and damaged his femoral artery. Romalis saved his own life by using his bathrobe belt as a tourniquet. Romalis had become more outspoken about abortion rights since he was shot, citing the harm done to women by illegal abortion and the thousands of cases of septic abortion that came to his hospital in residency.
- November 10, 1995: Hugh Short of Ancaster, Ontario was shot. A sniper's bullet fired into his home shattered his elbow and ended his surgical career. Short was not a high-profile target: it was not widely known that he did abortions.
- November 11, 1997: Jack Fainman, a physician of Winnipeg, Manitoba, was shot. A gunman fired through the back window of Fainman's riverbank home in Winnipeg about 9 pm and struck him in the right shoulder, inches from his heart. The police would not comment on whether Fainman, who has declined interview requests since the attack, is still performing abortions.
- July 11, 2000: Garson Romalis was stabbed by an unidentified assailant in the lobby of his clinic.

==== Bombing and property damage ====
- February 25, 1990: Two men broke into a clinic in Vancouver and destroyed C$30,000 worth of medical equipment with crowbars. (Note: Diemer, Ulli. (May 1990). News Briefs. Connexions Digest. Retrieved February 11, 2007.)
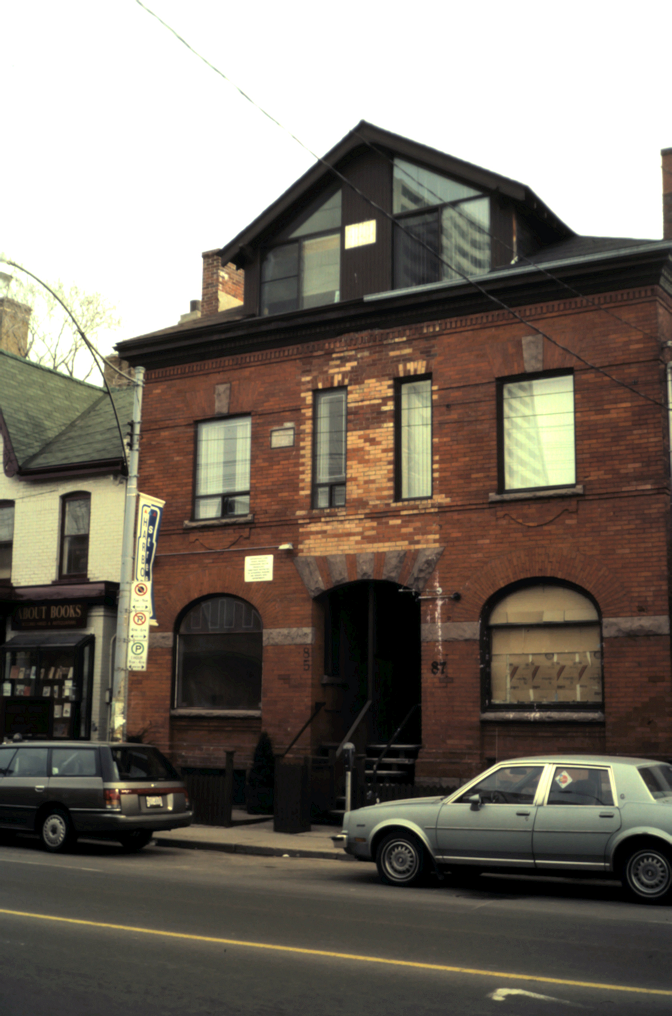
- Henry Morgentaler's abortion clinic on Harbord Street in Toronto, 1991
  May 18, 1992: A Toronto clinic operated by Henry Morgentaler was firebombed, causing the entire front wall of the building to collapse. (Note: Bagley Gordon (1992). "Bombing of Toronto abortion clinic raises stakes in bitter debate". Canadian Medical Association Journal. 147 (10): 1528–1533. PMC 1336558. PMID 1423091.) The Morgentaler Clinic on Harbord Street in Toronto was firebombed during the night by two people (caught on security camera) using gasoline and a firework to set off the explosion. The next day, clinic management announced that the firebombing failed to prevent any abortions, since all scheduled abortions were carried out in alternative locations. A portion of the Toronto Women's Bookstore, next door, was damaged. No one was hurt but the building had to be demolished. As a result of the arson, the Ontario government decided to spend $420,000 on improved security for abortion clinics. At the time, all four free-standing clinics in Ontario were in Toronto. The government wanted to gather information about activities by anti-abortion sympathizers; at the time, law enforcement agencies in Canada did not collect statistics about harassment and violence against abortion providers, their clinics, or their clients. Six months after the attack, the Toronto Police Force still had not made any progress in uncovering the attackers, any leads on suspects lead to dead-ends.

=== New Zealand ===
- 1976: An arson attack was carried out at the Auckland Medical Aid Centre, which was estimated to cause $100,000 in damages to the facility. The Auckland office of the Sisters Overseas Service organisation was targeted that same evening.
- Circa 1999: In the late 1990s, Graeme White was found guilty and sent to prison for tunneling into an abortion clinic with what the police described as "incendiary devices".

=== United States ===
==== Murders ====
In the United States, violence directed towards abortion providers has killed at least thirteen people, including four doctors, two clinic employees, a state representative and her husband, a security guard, a police officer, two people (unclear of their connection), and a clinic escort. (Note: Another abortion doctor, George Wayne Patterson, was shot and killed outside an adult movie theater in Mobile, Alabama on August 21, 1993, but authorities attribute his death to a botched robbery."Man Arrested in Killing of Mobile Abortion Doctor". The New York Times. September 5, 1993.; Encyclopedia of Terrorism, H. Kushner, Sage Publications, 2003, p.39) Seven murders occurred in the 1990s.

- March 10, 1993: Gynaecologist David Gunn of Pensacola, Florida was fatally shot during a protest. He had been the subject of wanted-style posters distributed by Operation Rescue in the summer of 1992. Michael F. Griffin was found guilty of Gunn's murder and was sentenced to life in prison.
- July 29, 1994: John Britton, a physician, and James Barrett, a clinic escort, were both shot to death outside another facility, the Ladies Center, in Pensacola. Paul Jennings Hill was charged with the killings. Hill received a death sentence and was executed on September 3, 2003. The clinic in Pensacola had been bombed before in 1984 and was also bombed subsequently in 2012.
- December 30, 1994: Two receptionists, Shannon Lowney and Lee Ann Nichols, were killed in two clinic attacks in Brookline, Massachusetts. John Salvi was arrested and confessed to the killings. He was found guilty of two counts of first degree murder and sentenced to life in prison. Salvi died in prison on November 29, 1996, and guards found his body under his bed with a plastic garbage bag tied around his head. His death was ruled a suicide. Salvi had also confessed to a non-lethal attack in Norfolk, Virginia days before the Brookline killings.
- January 29, 1998: Robert Sanderson, an off-duty police officer who worked as a security guard at an abortion clinic in Birmingham, Alabama, was killed when his workplace was bombed. Eric Rudolph admitted responsibility; he was also charged with three Atlanta bombings: the 1997 bombing of an abortion center, the 1996 Centennial Olympic Park bombing, and another of a lesbian nightclub. He was found guilty of the crimes and received two life sentences as a result.
- October 23, 1998: Barnett Slepian, an obstetrician who provided abortion services in the Buffalo area, was shot to death with a high-powered rifle at his home in Amherst, New York by a sniper who hid in the woods behind Dr. Slepian's home and shot him through his kitchen window right in front of his family, shortly after they had returned home for a memorial service for Dr. Slepian's father. His was the last in a series of similar shootings against providers in Canada and northern New York state which were all likely committed by James Kopp. Kopp was convicted of Slepian's murder after being apprehended in France in 2001, and was given a life sentence in prison.
- May 31, 2009: George Tiller was shot and killed by Scott Roeder as Tiller served as an usher at a church in Wichita, Kansas. This was not Tiller's first time being a victim to anti-abortion violence. Tiller was shot once before in 1993 by Shelley Shannon, who was sentenced 10 years in prison for the shooting. Roeder was given a life sentence in prison, with the possibility of parole after 25 years.
- November 27, 2015: A shooting at a Planned Parenthood clinic in Colorado Springs, Colorado, left three dead and several injured, and a suspect Robert L. Dear was apprehended. The suspect had previously acted against other clinics, and referred to himself as a "warrior for the babies" at his hearing. Neighbors and former neighbors described the suspect as "reclusive", and police from several states where the suspect resided described a history of run-ins dating from at least 1997. As of December 2015, the trial of the suspect was open; but, on May 11, 2016, the court declared the suspect incompetent to stand trial after a mental evaluation was completed. Dear was indefinitely confined at a Colorado state mental hospital beginning in 2016, while his case remained on hold. Dear died in custody on November 22, 2025, almost 10 years after the shooting.
- June 14, 2025: Minnesota state representative Melissa Hortman and her husband were assassinated in their home in Brooklyn Park, Minnesota by a man impersonating a police officer. The same man had earlier shot Minnesota state senator John Hoffman (Minnesota politician) and his wife, who survived. The suspect, 57-year old Vance Luther Boelter, was an evangelical Christian businessman who was a member of the anti-abortion movement. Police found writings in the suspect's car that included a list of nearly 70 names, mostly Democrat politicians or figures with ties to groups that either advocate for abortion rights or provide abortion services. Boelter pled guilty to the killings to avoid the death penalty and instead received two consecutive life sentences.

==== Attempted murder, assault, and kidnapping ====
According to statistics gathered by the National Abortion Federation (NAF), an organization of abortion providers, since 1977 in the United States and Canada, there have been 17 attempted murders, 383 death threats, 153 incidents of assault or battery, 13 wounded, 100 butyric acid stink bomb attacks, 373 physical invasions, 41 bombings, 655 anthrax threats, (Note: Doan 2007, p. 110) and 3 kidnappings committed against abortion providers. (Note: National Abortion Federation (2009), "Incidence of Violence & Disruption Against Abortion Providers in the U.S. & Canada". Retrieved February 9, 2010.) Between 1977 and 1990, 77 death threats were made, with 250 made between 1991 and 1999. Attempted murders in the U.S. included: in 1985 45% of clinics reported bomb threats, decreasing to 15% in 2000. One fifth of clinics in 2000 experienced some form of extreme activity. (Note: Doan 2007, p. 113)

- August 1982: Three men identifying as the Army of God kidnapped Hector Zevallos (a doctor and clinic owner) and his wife, Rosalee Jean, holding them for eight days.
- June 15, 1984: Following his and an accomplice's previous destruction of equipment at a Birmingham clinic, Edward Markley, a Benedictine priest who was the Birmingham diocesan "Coordinator for Pro-Life Activities", entered the Women's Community Health Center in Huntsville, Alabama, assaulting at least two clinic workers. Kathryn Wood, one of the workers, received back injuries and a broken neck vertebrae while preventing Markley from splashing red paint on the clinic's equipment. Markley was convicted of first-degree criminal mischief, one count of third-degree assault, and one count of harassment in the Huntsville attack.
- December 28, 1991: Two people were wounded by gunshot at the Central Health Center in Springfield, Missouri. The assailant was never caught.
- January 14, 1992: Dr. Douglas Karpen was wounded by gunshot at Women's Pavilion in Houston. The assailant was never caught.
- May 19, 1993: Shots were fired into the home of Dr. Robert Crist of Overland Park, Kansas. The assailant was never caught.
- August 19, 1993: George Tiller was shot outside of an abortion facility in Wichita, Kansas. Shelley Shannon was convicted of the crime and received an 11-year prison sentence (20 years were later added for arson and acid attacks on clinics).
- July 29, 1994: June Barrett was shot in the same attack which claimed the lives of James Barrett, her husband, and John Britton.
- December 30, 1994: Five individuals were wounded in the shootings which killed Shannon Lowney and Lee Ann Nichols.
- December 18, 1996: Calvin Jackson, a medical doctor of New Orleans, Louisiana was stabbed 15 times, losing 4 pints of blood. Donald Cooper was charged with second degree attempted murder and was sentenced to 20 years in prison.
- October 28, 1997: David Gandell, a medical doctor of Rochester, New York sustained serious injuries after being targeted by a sniper firing through a window in his home.
- January 29, 1998: Emily Lyons, a nurse, was severely injured, and lost an eye, in the bombing which also killed off-duty police officer Robert Sanderson.
- June 14, 2025: John Hoffman, a member of the Minnesota state senate, and his wife Yvette Hoffman were seriously wounded by gunshots in an assassination attempt by the same attacker who later killed state representative Melissa Hortman and her husband Mark Hortman.
- November 14, 2025: One person was injured during a shooting outside of a Planned Parenthood in Columbia, South Carolina. Mark Baumgartner, the founder of anti-abortion group "A Moment Of Hope", was arrested and charged with assault and battery of a high and aggravated nature and possession of a weapon during a violent crime.

==== Arson, bombing, and property crime ====
According to NAF, since 1977 in the United States and Canada, property crimes committed against abortion providers have included 41 bombings, 173 arsons, 91 attempted bombings or arsons, 619 bomb threats, 1630 incidents of trespassing, 1264 incidents of vandalism, and 100 attacks with butyric acid ("stink bombs"). The New York Times also cites over one hundred clinic bombings and incidents of arson, over three hundred invasions, and over four hundred incidents of vandalism between 1978 and 1993. The first clinic arson occurred in Oregon in March 1976 and the first bombing occurred in February 1978 in Ohio. (Note: National Abortion Federation. (2007). "Arsons and Bombings." Retrieved February 10, 2007.) Incidents have included:

- February 23, 1977: A clinic in Saint Paul, Minnesota was set on fire. The fire caused $250,000 in damages and forced the suspension of abortion services for six months.
- May 1977: A clinic in Burlington, Vermont was destroyed by a fire, resulting in its closure for seven months.
- August 1977: Four bottles of gasoline were thrown through a clinic in Omaha, Nebraska, destroying 75 percent of it.
- November 1977: A man broke into a medical building in Cincinnati and set a crib on fire. A Planned Parenthood was located in the building, but no abortions were provided there. The same month, a firebomb was thrown at a clinic and a chemical bomb was thrown at a separate clinic in separate incidents.
- January 8, 1978: A suspected arson caused $200,000 in damages at a clinic in Columbus, Ohio.
- February 19, 1978: A man posing as a delivery man splashed gasoline in a technician's face before setting a clinic on fire in Cleveland, Ohio. Everyone inside the clinic escaped.
- May 26, 1983: Joseph Grace set the Hillcrest clinic in Norfolk, Virginia ablaze. He was arrested while sleeping in his van a few blocks from the clinic when a patrol officer noticed the smell of kerosene.
- May 12, 1984: Two men entered a Birmingham, Alabama clinic on Mother's Day weekend shortly after a lone woman opened the doors at 7:25 A.M. Forcing their way into the clinic, one of the men threatened the woman if she tried to prevent the attack while the other, wielding a sledgehammer, did between $7,500 and $8,500 of damage to suction equipment. The man who damaged the equipment was later identified as Edward Markley. Markley is a Benedictine priest who was the Birmingham diocesan "Coordinator for Pro-Life Activities". Markley was convicted of first-degree criminal mischief and second-degree burglary. His accomplice has never been identified. The following month (near Father's Day), Markley entered a women's health center in Huntsville, Alabama (see above).
- July 7, 1984: A bomb detonated at a Planned Parenthood clinic in Annapolis, Maryland. Two people were inside but neither were injured.
- December 25, 1984: An abortion clinic and two physicians' offices in Pensacola, Florida, were bombed in the early morning of Christmas Day by a quartet of young people (Matt Goldsby, Jimmy Simmons, Kathy Simmons, Kaye Wiggins) who later called the bombings "a gift to Jesus on his birthday". (Note: Triggle, Nick (June 1, 2009) "Anti-abortion and violence in the US" BBC News) (Note: Churchville, Victoria (January 6, 1985) "Bomb Suspects Cite Religious Motive" The Washington Post p. A-16) The clinic, the Ladies Center, would later be the site of the murder of John Britton and James Barrett in 1994 and a firebombing in 2012.
- December 30, 1985: John A. Brockhoeft firebombed an abortion clinic in Cincinnati. Brockhoeft later planned to bomb an abortion clinic in Florida.
- March 26, 1986: Six anti-abortion activists, including John Burt and Joan Andrews, were arrested after invading an abortion clinic in Pensacola, Florida, causing property damage and injuring two women (a clinic manager and a member of the local NOW chapter). Burt was convicted of attempted burglary of an occupied building, assault, battery, and resisting arrest without violence, and was sentenced to 141 days already served in jail and four years of probation; his 18-year-old daughter, Sarah Burt, who also took part in the invasion, was sentenced to 15 days in jail (with credit for two days already served) and three years of probation. Andrews refused to pledge not to carry out such actions in the future and was convicted of burglary, criminal mischief and resisting arrest without violence. She was sentenced to five years in prison, which she spent largely in self-imposed isolation, refusing a mattress and all medical care.
- July 27, 1987: Eight members of the Bible Missionary Fellowship, a fundamentalist church in Santee, California, attempted to bomb the Alvarado Medical Center abortion clinic. Church member Cheryl Sullenger procured gunpowder, bomb materials, and a disguise for co-conspirator Eric Everett Svelmoe, who planted a gasoline bomb. It was placed at the premises but failed to detonate as the fuse was blown out by wind.
- July 3, 1989: A fire was started at the Feminist Health Center clinic in Concord, New Hampshire, on the day U.S. Supreme Court upheld a Missouri law banning funding of public facilities as related to abortion. The clinic was set afire again in 2000.
- February 14–23, 1991: The Central Ohio Women's Clinic that was housed in a building owned by the Planned Parenthood of Central Ohio in Columbus, Ohio were burned by members of the Christian Liberation Army, with damages estimates $75,000 in damages. Nine days later threw a firebomb into the Capital Care Women's Center in Columbus, Ohio, leaving damages sustained $250,000 in damages.
- March 29, 1993: Blue Mountain Clinic in Missoula, Montana; at around 1 a.m., an arsonist snuck onto the premises and firebombed the clinic. The perpetrator, a Washington man, was ultimately caught, convicted and imprisoned. The facility was a near-total loss, but all of the patients' records, though damaged, survived the fire in metal file cabinets.
- January 1997: Eric Rudolph admitted, as part of a plea deal for the Centennial Olympic Park bombing at the 1996 Olympic Games to placing a pair of bombs that exploded at the Northside Family Planning Services clinic in the Atlanta suburb of Sandy Springs.
- May 21, 1998: Three people were injured when acid was poured at the entrances of five abortion clinics in Miami, Florida. (Note: "3 injured in Fla. abortion clinic vandalism; FBI launches probe", The Baltimore Sun, May 22, 1998)
- March 13, 1999: A bomb caused minor damage at an Asheville, North Carolina clinic.
- September 20, 1999: An abortion clinic in Bakersfield, California was set on fire.
- October 1999: Martin Uphoff set fire to a Planned Parenthood clinic in Sioux Falls, South Dakota causing minimal damage. He was later sentenced to 60 months in prison.
- May 28, 2000: An arson at a clinic in Concord, New Hampshire, resulted in several thousand dollars' worth of damage. The case remains unsolved. (Note: Daley, B.(2000, May 30). The Boston Globe. "Abortion Clinic Fire 'Suspicious': Women's Health Center Has Been Target Of Past Protests, Vandalism" Lexis Nexis Academic Universe. Retrieved March 26, 2009.) This was the second arson at the clinic.
- September 30, 2000: John Earl, a Catholic priest, drove his car into the Northern Illinois Health Clinic in Rockford, Illinois after learning that the FDA had approved the drug RU-486. He pulled out an axe before being forced to the ground by the owner of the building, who fired two warning shots from a shotgun. He was sentenced to 30 months of probation and paid over $7,000 in fines and restitution, but was not removed from the priesthood.
- June 11, 2001: An unsolved bombing at a clinic in Tacoma, Washington, destroyed a wall, resulting in $6,000 in damages.
- January 9, 2005: Eastside Women's Clinic in Olympia, Washington sustained $500,000 damage in an arson.
- July 4, 2005: A clinic in West Palm Beach, Florida, was the target of a probable arson.
- December 12, 2005: Patricia Hughes and Jeremy Dunahoe threw a Molotov cocktail at a clinic in Shreveport, Louisiana. The device missed the building and no damage was caused. In August 2006, Hughes was sentenced to six years in prison, and Dunahoe to one year. Hughes claimed the bomb was a "memorial lamp" for an abortion she had had there.
- September 11, 2006: David McMenemy of Rochester Hills, Michigan, crashed his car into the Edgerton Women's Care Center in Davenport, Iowa. He then doused the lobby in gasoline and started a fire. McMenemy committed these acts in the belief that the center was performing abortions; however, Edgerton is not an abortion clinic. Time magazine listed the incident in a "Top 10 Inept Terrorist Plots" list. (Note: Fletcher, Dan. "Top 10 Inept Terrorist Plots" Time September 8, 2009. Retrieved June 21, 2011.)
- April 25, 2007: A package left at a women's health clinic in Austin, Texas, contained an explosive device capable of inflicting serious injury or death. A bomb squad detonated the device after evacuating the building. Paul Ross Evans (who had a criminal record for armed robbery and theft) was found guilty of the crime.
- May 9, 2007: An unidentified person deliberately set fire to a Planned Parenthood clinic in Virginia Beach, Virginia. (Note: "Planned Parenthood Arson". WKTR. May 12, 2007.)
- December 6, 2007: Chad Altman and Sergio Baca were arrested for the arson of Curtis Boyd's clinic in Albuquerque. Baca's girlfriend had scheduled an appointment for an abortion at the clinic.
- January 22, 2009: Matthew L. Derosia, 32, who was reported to have had a history of mental illness, rammed an SUV into the front entrance of a Planned Parenthood clinic in Saint Paul, Minnesota, (Note: "Man charged with driving into Planned Parenthood facility". Minneapolis Star-Tribune. January 23, 2009. Retrieved January 27, 2009.) causing between $2,500 and $5,000 in damage. Derosia, who told police that Jesus told him to "stop the murderers," was ruled competent to stand trial. He pleaded guilty in March 2009 to one count of criminal damage to property.
- August 29, 2009: Two days after a nearby anti-abortion protest, an unknown arsonist threw a molotov cocktail at a Planned Parenthood in Lincoln, Nebraska. The bomb fell short of the building, leaving no property damage or casualties.
- January 1, 2012: Bobby Joe Rogers, 41, firebombed the American Family Planning Clinic in Pensacola, Florida, with a Molotov cocktail; the fire gutted the building. Rogers told investigators that he was motivated to commit the crime by his opposition to abortion, and that what more directly prompted the act was seeing a patient enter the clinic during one of the frequent anti-abortion protests there. The clinic had previously been bombed at Christmas in 1984 and was the site of the murder of John Britton and James Barrett in 1994.
- April 1, 2012: A bomb exploded on the windowsill of a Planned Parenthood clinic in Grand Chute, Wisconsin, resulting in a fire that caused minimal damage.
- April 11, 2013: Benjamin David Curell, 27, caused extensive damage to a Planned Parenthood clinic in Bloomington, Indiana, vandalizing it with an axe. (Note: Amanda Rakes, Police: Man caused 'extensive damage' inside Planned Parenthood using ax, WXIN (April 11, 2013).) Curell was convicted in state court of felony burglary, and pleaded guilty in federal court to one count of violating the Freedom of Access to Clinic Entrances Act. In the federal case, he was sentenced to three years of probation and ordered to pay restitution.
- October 3–4, 2013: 32-year-old Jebediah Stout attempted to set a Planned Parenthood clinic in Joplin, Missouri on fire two days in a row. Stout previously set a fire at a Joplin mosque.
- March 4, 2014: 24-year-old Zachary Klundt broke into All Families Healthcare in Kalispell, Montana and destroyed everything inside the clinic. He was arrested and charged with six felony charges, including three counts of theft, one of burglary, one of attempted burglary, and one of criminal mischief. He was sentenced to 20 years in prison and ordered to pay over $600,000 in restitution.
- September 4, 2015: A Planned Parenthood clinic in Pullman, Washington was intentionally set on fire. No injuries were reported due to the time of day, but the FBI was involved because of a history of domestic terrorism against the clinic. The crime was never solved. The clinic reopened six months later.
- October 22, 2015: A Planned Parenthood clinic in Claremont, New Hampshire was vandalized by a juvenile intruder. Damaged in the attack were computers, furniture, plumbing fixtures, office equipment, medical equipment, phone lines, windows, and walls. The flooding that resulted from the vandalism also damaged an adjacent business.
- February 24–25, 2016: Travis Reynolds, 21, vandalized a Baltimore-area women's health care clinic with anti-abortion graffiti. After being arrested, Reynolds "admitted to police that he defaced the clinic's doors, walls and windows because he thought that it would deter women from using the clinic". Reynolds pleaded guilty in federal court to one count of violating the Freedom of Access to Clinic Entrances Act in October 2016.
- March 7, 2016: Rachel Ann Jackson, 71, vandalized a Planned Parenthood clinic in Columbus, Ohio, with the message "SATAN DEN OF BABY KILLERS..." She pleaded guilty to felony counts of breaking and entering and vandalism and a misdemeanor count of aggravated trespass. Jackson was sentenced to probation, with the judge citing her struggle with serious mental illness as a mitigating factor.
- February 14, 2018: Marckles Alcius, 34, a Haitian national from Lowell, Massachusetts, stole a bakery truck and drove it into a Planned Parenthood clinic in East Orange, New Jersey, injuring three people. He pleaded guilty to aggravated assault, causing injury or damage and being in possession of the stolen truck.
- February 10, 2019: Wesley Brian Kaster, 43, threw a Molotov cocktail at a Planned Parenthood clinic in Columbia, Missouri. Kaster admitted to setting the fire because Planned Parenthood provided abortions, although Planned Parenthood stated that the clinic was not providing abortions at the time due to a state law. Kaster was sentenced to five years in prison.
- January 3, 2020: A high school student, Samuel Gulick, spray-painted "Deus Vult" on a clinic in Newark, Delaware before throwing a Molotov Cocktail at the front window. Gulick was sentenced to 26 months in prison by a federal judge.
- October 10, 2020: A man threw multiple Molotovs at a Planned Parenthood clinic in Fort Myers, Florida. He was later convicted of arson, using an incendiary device and criminal mischief with property damage, sentenced to one year in prison and seven years probation.
- October 22, 2020: Five anti-abortion protesters were arrested after forcing their way into a clinic in Washington, DC and blocking people from entering. They were convicted of violating federal law and face up to 11 years in prison.
- January 23, 2021: A man fired a shotgun at a Tennessee Planned Parenthood clinic; no one was injured. News outlets noted that the attack took place on the anniversary of the Roe v. Wade decision and at a time when Tennessee's governor, Bill Lee, was involved in a heated online debate regarding abortion and health care. The same man later attacked the clinic in December.
- May 21, 2021: A man shot at a Planned Parenthood location in Pasadena, California with a BB gun several times between June 2020 and May 2021.
- November 23, 2021: A man destroyed several windows and security cameras at a Planned Parenthood in Grants Pass, Oregon. Devin Kruse, 27, pleaded guilty to two counts of violating the federal Freedom of Access to Clinic Entrances Act.
- December 31, 2021: On New Year's Eve, a fire destroyed a Planned Parenthood in Knoxville, Tennessee. The building was closed at the time for renovations. The Knoxville Fire Department and Bureau of Alcohol, Tobacco, Firearms, and Explosives ruled the fire arson. The clinic had previously been shot at in January of the same year. In October 2022, federal court documents identified the arsonist as Mark Thomas Reno, who previously attacked the clinic in January and was present at the January 6 Capitol attack. Reno died on August 15, 2022.
- March 13, 2022: Three men threw a Molotov cocktail at a medical building used by Planned Parenthood in Costa Mesa, California. 24-year old ex-Marine and Neo-Nazi Chance Brannon, who had participated in the attack and planned several other attacks on targets around southern California, was sentenced to 9 years in prison.
- May 25, 2022: A masked woman set a fire at a planned abortion clinic in Casper, Wyoming. The ATF offered a $5,000 reward for information leading to her arrest. In June 2023, Casper College student Lorna Green pleaded guilty to the arson. She told investigators that she was opposed to abortion.
- July 31, 2022: A man set a Planned Parenthood building on fire in Kalamazoo, Michigan. A suspect was charged with arson of an organization receiving federal funding. According to investigators the suspect posted videos on YouTube railing against abortion. After pleading guilty to arson the man was sentenced to 5 years in prison.
- August 24, 2022: Two anti-abortion protesters were caught on tape vandalizing an abortion-rights church in the Lake View, Chicago neighborhood on Chicago's north side.
- January 15, 2023: An arsonist set a Planned Parenthood in Peoria, Illinois on fire. The fire came days after Illinois passed a law protecting abortion rights. He was later sentenced to 10 years in prison.
- May 20, 2023: An anti-abortion protester in Danville, Illinois was arrested and charged with attempted arson after ramming his vehicle filled with containers of gasoline into a prospective abortion clinic, just weeks after hundreds of abortion rights protesters had rallied in opposition to a proposed local ordinance banning abortion pills, which are legal in Illinois per the Reproductive Health Care Act. He was later sentenced to 5 years in prison.
- October 5, 2023: An unknown individual fired two shotgun rounds into the front entrance of a Planned Parenthood clinic in Helena, Montana. In 2026, the individual was identified as 20-year old Charles Felix Jones, who had committed the crime when he was 17 years old and later confessed to it.
- March 8, 2026: Charles Felix Jones, 20, turned himself in to the police after trespassing into a Montana doctor's backyard and throwing items at his back window before leaving, having originally intended to murder the doctor and his wife before changing his mind. He also confessed to the 2023 shooting at a Planned Parenthood clinic in Helena. He was charged with two counts of assault with a weapon, intimidation and criminal trespass.
- April 9, 2026: An intruder set a fire at a Planned Parenthood clinic in the Mount Auburn neighborhood of Cincinnati.

==== Anthrax threats ====
The first hoax letters claiming to contain anthrax were mailed to U.S. clinics in October 1998, a few days after the shooting of Barnett Slepian; since then, there have been 655 such bioterror threats made against abortion providers. None of the "anthrax" in these cases was real. (Note: "Anthrax Attacks". National Abortion Federation (2007). Retrieved February 10, 2007.)

- November 2001: After the genuine 2001 anthrax attacks, Clayton Waagner mailed hoax letters containing a white powder to 554 clinics. On December 3, 2003, Waagner was convicted of 51 charges relating to the anthrax scare.

== Specific incidents ==
=== Army of God ===
The Department of Justice and Department of Homeland Security's joint Terrorism Knowledge Base, identify the Army of God as an underground terrorist organization active in the United States. It was formed in 1982, and is responsible for a substantial amount of anti-abortion violence. The group has committed property crimes, acts of kidnapping, attempted murder, and murder. While sharing a common ideology and tactics, members claim to rarely communicate; to avoid risk of information leaking to outside sources.

In August 1982, three men identifying as the Army of God kidnapped Hector Zevallos (a doctor and clinic owner) and his wife, Rosalee Jean, holding them for eight days and released them unharmed. In 1993, Shelley Shannon, an Army of God member, admitted to the attempted murder of George Tiller. Law enforcement officials found the Army of God Manual, a tactical guide to arson, chemical attacks, invasions, and bombings buried in Shelley Shannon's backyard. Paul Jennings Hill was found guilty of the murder of both John Britton and clinic escort James Barrett.

The Army of God published a "Defensive Action Statement" signed by more than two dozen supporters of Hill, saying that "whatever force is legitimate to defend the life of a born child is legitimate to defend the life of an unborn child... if in fact Paul Hill did kill or wound abortionist John Britton and clinic assistants James Barrett and Mrs. Barrett, his actions are morally justified if they were necessary for the purpose of defending innocent human life". The AOG claimed responsibility for Eric Robert Rudolph's 1997 shrapnel bombing of abortion clinics in Atlanta and Birmingham. The organization embraces its description as terrorist.

=== Physician "wanted" posters ===
In the late 1990s, an organization called American Coalition of Life Activists (ACLA) was accused of implicitly advocating violence by its publication on its "Nuremberg Files" website of wanted-style posters, which featured a photograph of a physician who performed abortions along with a monetary reward for any information that would lead to his "arrest, conviction, and revocation of license to practice medicine". The ACLA's website described these physicians as war criminals and accused them of committing "crimes against humanity". The web site also published names, home addresses, telephone numbers, and other personal information regarding abortion providers—highlighting the names of those who had been wounded and striking out those of who had been killed. George Tiller's name was included on this list along with many others. The site was accused of being a thinly veiled hit list intended to incite violence; others claimed that it was protected under the First Amendment of the United States Constitution. In 2002, after a prolonged debate, the 9th Circuit Court of Appeals ruled that the "posters" constituted an illegal threat.

== Reactions ==
=== Anti-abortion reactions ===
Anti-abortion organizations including Family Research Council, Americans United for Life, Concerned Women for America, Susan B. Anthony List, American Life League, Students for Life of America, Pro-Life Action League and 40 Days For Life condemned the 2009 murder of Kansas doctor George Tiller.

In a 2009 press release, Operation Rescue founder Randall Terry issued a statement calling for peaceful protests to expose abortion providers. According to Media Matters and The Colorado Independent, however, Terry has also led apparently contradictory public prayers that an abortion provider would "[convert] to God" or that "calamity [would] strike him". Terry added that he hoped the "baby killer would be tried and executed for crimes against humanity". The doctor targeted by Terry's prayers said to the press, "He's clearly inciting someone, anyone, to kill me"; a spokesman responded that Terry only meant that "God would deal with [the doctor]".

Flip Benham, director of Operation Rescue, accused "those in the abortion-providing industry" of committing most of the violence in an attempt to discredit the antiabortion movement. He defended his organization's use of inflammatory rhetoric, saying: "This whole thing isn't about violence. It's all about silence – silencing the Christian message. That's what they want." He also stated, "Our inflammatory rhetoric is only revealing a far more inflammatory truth."

== Media depictions of anti-abortion violence ==
Literature

- The Fourth Procedure, a 1995 novel by Stanley Pottinger, is a medical thriller and murder mystery that depicts anti-abortion violence in its plot. Two men responsible for the bombing of an abortion clinic turn up dead with baby dolls surgically implanted inside of them. (Note: Braille Library. (September 1999). Narrated by David Hartley Margolin. Retrieved February 10, 2007.)
- Insomnia (1994), by Stephen King, has much of the plot focusing around violent anti-abortion campaigners and their opposition to an abortion rights speech due to be held in their town. The group murders several women they believe to be seeking abortions and attempts to assassinate the speaker. They are motivated by a conspiracy theory that the speaker is part of a secret society that was a continuation of Herod's Massacre of the Innocents.
- "Killing Babies" (1996), by T. C. Boyle, a highly controversial short story written in response to attacks on abortion providers. The story first appeared in The New Yorker and was included in The Best American Short Stories 1997.
- Gideon's Torch, a 1995 novel by Charles Colson and Ellen Santilli Vaughn, begins with the murder of a doctor who provides abortions and chronicles political fallout from the murder and a resulting government crackdown on right-to-lifers.
- Keely and Du, a 1993 play by Jane Martin, concerns an anti-abortion cult who kidnaps a pregnant woman and holds her captive in an attempt to force her to give birth after being raped.

Film

- Palindromes, a 2004 film directed by Todd Solondz, depicts the murder of an abortion doctor in his home, similar to the Barnett Slepian case.
- In If These Walls Could Talk, a 1996 film directed by Nancy Savoca and Cher, the third time period involves the shooting of a doctor performing an abortion.

Television

- "HOMR", a 2001 episode of The Simpsons, shows a parody of the television show Davey and Goliath where the Davey character is building a pipe bomb to destroy a Planned Parenthood.
- "Dignity", a 2009 episode of the crime drama Law & Order, was inspired by the killing of George Tiller and focused on the killing of an abortion provider by an activist. Abortion rights activists criticized the episode for making use of mainstream anti-abortion arguments. The National Organization for Women (NOW) listed the episode in their Media Hall of Shame, saying it "was loaded with anti-abortion sentiment and propaganda" and that it "outrageously implied that physicians like Dr. Tiller may be culpable in their own murders because they themselves are baby killers". Meanwhile, anti-abortion activists had condemned the killing of Tiller that inspired the episode, but praised the episode for being "outright pro-life", with Dave Andrusko of the National Right to Life Committee saying, "[I]t occurred to me as I listened in utter astonishment that each of these observations could have been presented in a way that was artificial, forced, or (as so often is the case with network portraits of pro-lifers) something that you would expect from an idiot. None of that was the case. These were real flesh-and-blood people, not caricatures."
- "Hammered", a 2009 episode of Law and Order: Special Victims Unit showed the possible motive of a murder as anti-abortion violence. The Nuremberg Files site is mentioned in the episode when detectives tell the doctor's ex-husband about the murder. The abortion clinic they visit has bulletproof glass, because it had been the target of a sniper who shot and wounded a receptionist. When the detectives go to the clinic, they experience an egging of the clinic as they look into collecting several boxes of hate mail that the clinic received.
- "Thou Shalt Not Kill", the 2002 premiere episode of the BBC series Spooks is about a fictional anti-abortion terrorist leader visiting the UK to establish a series of terror cells.
- "Pro-Life", a 2007 episode of the Showtime Masters of Horror TV series, tells the tale of a Christian man whose daughter is raped by a demon. When she tries to have her unnatural child aborted, her Christian father starts hearing messages from a voice he thinks is "God". He and her brothers storm the abortion clinic and kill any in their way.
- "Bored of the Rings", a 2007 episode from The Sarah Silverman Program a radical anti-abortion group attempts to bomb an abortion clinic, but are stopped by Sarah.
- On Orange Is The New Black (2013 – 2019), the character Tiffany "Pennsatucky" Doggett was imprisoned for shooting an abortion clinic nurse after the nurse made comments on the number of abortions that Tiffany had previously had. The character is portrayed as being a self-proclaimed evangelical Christian after the incident and is funded by pro-life groups.

Music

- The song "Get Your Gunn" from Marilyn Manson's 1994 album Portrait of an American Family is about the killing of David Gunn. (Note: Manson, Marilyn (May 28, 1999), "Columbine: Whose Fault Is It?", Rolling Stone. Retrieved February 10, 2007.)
- The song "Hello Birmingham" from the 1999 album To the Teeth by Ani DiFranco was written in response to the bombing in Birmingham, Alabama, as well as the murder of Barnett Slepian in Amherst, New York (near DiFranco's hometown of Buffalo).
- The song "F.D.K. (Fearless Doctor Killers)" from Mudhoney's 1995 album My Brother the Cow tells a story about a Baptist minister rapist who refuses to pay for an abortion but will not support the child after it is born. It includes the repeated refrain, "Save the baby/Kill the doctor".
- The song "I Need a Grip" by Maggie Estep on her 1994 album No More Mr. Nice Girl is a response to anti-abortion violence.
- The song "The Army of God" by hardcore punk band Behind Enemy Lines on their 2003 album The Global Cannibal deals with the acts of terrorism and murder performed on abortion clinics and their staff.
- The 1987 song "I Blew Up The Clinic Real Good" by Contemporary Christian music singer-songwriter Steve Taylor, criticizing anyone who claims to be a pro-life activist who would blow up abortion clinics or kill doctors.

== See also ==
- Abortion debate
- Abortion law
- Domestic terrorism in the United States
- Legal protection of access to abortion
- Religious terrorism
- Right-wing terrorism
- Murder of Jim Pouillon
- Jane's Revenge
