= Emily Lyons =

American nurse (born 1956)

- Born: July 18, 1956 (age 70); Montgomery, Alabama, U.S.
- Education: University of Alabama at Birmingham
- Occupations: Nurse, abortion activist
- Known for: Surviving anti-abortion terrorist bomb attack
- Spouse: Jeff Lyons

Emily Lyons (born July 18, 1956) is an American nurse who was gravely injured when Eric Robert Rudolph bombed an abortion clinic in Birmingham, Alabama, where she worked. She was a prominent figure during Rudolph's trial and sentencing, and has also become an activist for abortion rights.

== Early life ==
Lyons was born in 1956 in Montgomery, Alabama. She received a degree in nursing from the University of Alabama at Birmingham, with a focus on reproductive health, after which she worked in various nursing fields and locations, and taught nursing at the University of Arkansas at Monticello. At the time of the bombing, she was director of nursing at the New Woman All Women Clinic in Birmingham, having originally answered an advertisement for a part-time nurse.

=== Bombing ===
The morning of January 29, 1998, Lyons was approaching the clinic, when Robert Sanderson, an off-duty police officer and security guard, bent to inspect an unfamiliar potted plant in the front yard. The flowerpot contained a remote-controlled nail bomb, which exploded and killed Sanderson immediately. Lyons was severely injured: one eye was destroyed and the other damaged, her hand was mangled, a hole was torn in her abdomen that necessitated the removal of 10 inches of her intestines, and most of the flesh was blown off her legs and hand. She was badly burned, her leg was shattered, and shrapnel and nails are permanently buried in her body. Lyons spent eight weeks in the hospital and has had over twenty surgeries; even years after the blast, she continued using a wheelchair and had poor hearing and eyesight. She does not remember the blast.

Lyons and her husband, Jeff, were the focus of media attention after Rudolph's capture: Lyons expressed a hope of speaking to him and letting him know that he "failed." Lyons initially wanted Rudolph to receive life imprisonment or the death penalty, but during the trial, spoke to news sources about her wish that he receive the death penalty and strongly objected to a plea deal. When Rudolph pleaded guilty and received life in prison, Lyons was "extremely disappointed" that he would not be put to death, but noted that other lives could be saved because Rudolph had revealed where he had hidden explosives, as part of his plea deal.

== Activism ==
Lyons has said that the bombing "flipped a switch in [her] mind," changing her from a quiet person into an outspoken activist. In 1998, she testified before Congress in support of applying the Racketeer Influenced and Corrupt Organizations Act (RICO) to anti-abortion terrorists, and has spoken in other venues in support of the right to an abortion.

In 2005, Lyons appeared in a controversial advertisement opposing the nomination to the Supreme Court of John G. Roberts, who seven years before the bombing had filed a brief opposing the prosecution of abortion clinic blockaders under the federal Ku Klux Klan Act. Those who advocated the use of the Act argued that the obstruction of access to abortion clinics violated the civil rights of women, and thus fell within the Act's purview; Roberts, then Deputy Solicitor General, had argued that the protesters were only trespassing and should be prosecuted under state law rather than federal law. The ad contained images of the bombing, and claimed that Roberts supported Rudolph and excused anti-abortion violence. Lyons spoke at NARAL Pro-Choice America's press conference opposing the Roberts nomination. She also spoke in opposition to the nomination of Samuel Alito.

Lyons is the recipient of Planned Parenthood's Margaret Sanger Woman of Valor Award and the Ms. Foundation's Gloria Award.

== Media ==
Lyons was the subject of a year-long documentary project by the ABC News program Nightline, filmed from the day of the blast throughout her recovery during her first year. Lyons's experiences also formed part of the 2006 documentary Lake of Fire, whose title comes from threats and hate mail Lyons received telling her that she would go to hell. Becoming Emily, a dance piece, is also based on her story.
