= John Burt (anti-abortion activist) =

American anti-abortion activist

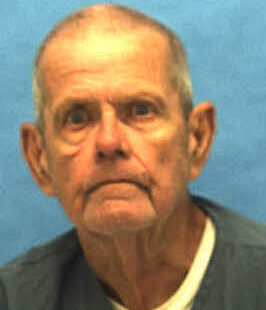
- Born: John Allen Burt; March 26, 1938; United States
- Died: April 19, 2013 (aged 75); Florida, U.S.

John Allen Burt (March 26, 1938 – April 19, 2013) was an American Christian fundamentalist, anti-abortion activist, and convicted child molester who called himself the "spiritual adviser" to murderers Michael Griffin and Paul Hill and other anti-abortionists. Burt ran "Our Father's House", which began as a Christian ministry and shelter for unwed mothers, later evolving into a private religious reformatory boarding school for "troubled" teenage girls. In 2003, he was arrested for molesting a 15-year-old girl who was living there. He was convicted and sentenced to 18 years in prison, where he died in 2013.

== Early life ==
Burt served in the Marines. He struggled with alcoholism and speed addiction until he converted to born-again Christianity. He also joined the Ku Klux Klan, albeit he later left the organization.

== Christian fundamentalism and arrests ==
In 1984, Matt Goldsby and Jimmy Simmons bombed several abortion clinics. Both had an extensive association with Burt, who called himself their "spiritual adviser," and picketed their trial. He later denied responsibility in influencing the bombers.

He was arrested in February, 1985, for trespassing at Dr. Bo Bagenholm's clinic, and was sentenced to five months' probation.

On March 26, 1986, his 48th birthday, Burt and five others invaded an abortion clinic, damaging equipment and injuring two women. He was convicted of burglary and assault. He was sentenced to four years' probation, and his daughter, who also took part in the invasion, was sentenced to three years' probation.

Anti-abortion activist John Brockhoeft was arrested after leaving Burt's house on May 6, 1988, with bomb-making materials and the intention to bomb an abortion clinic. Burt claimed not to know about Brockhoeft's plans, but he was sentenced to two years' house arrest.

When Michael Griffin murdered Dr. David Gunn on March 10, 1993, Burt was accused of brainwashing Griffin using graphic right-to-life propaganda. Gunn's family, together with Morris Dees of the Southern Poverty Law Center, filed a civil lawsuit that was settled with Gunn's family taking possession of land next to the abortion clinic, which Burt had purchased in 1991.

On February 23, 2001, Burt was arrested at the Community Healthcare Center of Pensacola for disorderly conduct, resisting arrest, and violating a noise ordinance. He was sentenced to six months' probation and ordered not to go near the clinic again.

Burt was also a known associate of, and so-called "spiritual adviser to", Paul Jennings Hill, who murdered Dr. John Britton and his escort James Barrett on July 29, 1994. Burt was also known to have met with Donald Spitz together with Hill a number of times.

== Child molestation ==
In 2003, Burt was charged with four counts of lewd and lascivious molestation and one count of lewd and lascivious conduct. The victim, a 15-year-old girl who had been staying at "Our Father's House" (Burt's Christian shelter for pregnant and/or disturbed teenage girls and unwed mothers) testified Burt began molesting her within weeks of her arrival there. She had filed a police report, but, like previous accusations from other girls staying at the house, it was dismissed for lack of evidence. However, she presented new evidence at Burt's trial, including a handwritten note from Burt which propositioned her for oral sex and sexual intercourse. The jury found Burt guilty on all five counts. Circuit Court Judge Ron Swanson sentenced him to 18 years in prison. He died in prison while serving his sentence in 2013.
