= David Trosch =

American priest (1935–2012)

David Charles Trosch (29 November 1935 – 12 October 2012) was an American Roman Catholic priest from Mobile, Alabama, who was the subject of controversy due to his promotion of the concept of justifiable homicide in the case of killing abortion providers. He was a supporter of anti-abortion extremist Paul Jennings Hill, who was executed in 2003 for murdering an abortion provider and his bodyguard. Trosch denied having ever met Hill although they dined and prayed together, and signed a document which attempted to justify lethal force against abortion providers.

== History ==
The Chicago-born Trosch first attained notoriety in 1993 when he tried to place an ad in the Mobile Press-Register, with a drawing titled "Justifiable Homicide", depicting a man holding a gun to the back of a doctor performing an abortion. His episcopal superiors directed him to "recant his stand or give up his job".

Although the ad was never published, Trosch was relieved of his parish duties and suspended by his bishop due to his ongoing public statements in defense of his views on the "justifiable homicide" of abortion providers.

Trosch died on 12 October 2012 in an Alabama nursing home from an extended illness. Archbishop Oscar Lipscomb of the Archdiocese of Mobile clarified at the time of Trosch's death that he had never officially censured Trosch, but that Trosch had been restricted from acting in a pastoral capacity since August 1993. Lipscomb said Trosch had "no public persona in the Church" but "was not a bad person" and "died in God's grace".
