= James Charles Kopp =

American convicted murderer

FBI Ten Most Wanted Fugitive
- Charges: Murder, Violation of the Freedom of Access to Clinic Entrances (FACE) act

Description
- Born: August 2, 1954 (age 72); Pasadena, California, U.S.

Status
- Convictions: Federal; Violating the FACE Act resulting in death Use of a firearm during a crime of violence resulting in death New York; Second degree murder
- Penalty: Federal; Life imprisonment New York; 25 years to life
- Status: Incarcerated
- Added: June 7, 1999
- Caught: March 30, 2001
- Number: 455
- Captured

James Charles Kopp (born August 2, 1954) is an American who was convicted in 2003 for the 1998 sniper-style murder of Barnett Slepian, an American OB-GYN physician from Amherst, New York who performed abortions. Prior to his capture, Kopp was on the FBI's list of Ten Most Wanted Fugitives. On June 7, 1999, he had become the 455th fugitive placed on the list by the FBI.

He has been referred to as a terrorist by the National Memorial Institute for the Prevention of Terrorism, and was "well-known in militant anti-abortion circles, where he was nicknamed Atomic Dog".

== Early life ==
James Charles Kopp was born in Pasadena, California and raised Lutheran, but later converted to Roman Catholicism. Kopp graduated from the University of California, Santa Cruz in 1976, with a bachelor's degree in biology, going on to take a master's degree in embryology from California State University Fullerton. Kopp started providing support to anti-abortion groups after his girlfriend underwent an abortion, and used his technical abilities to create special locks that protesters then used on the doors of abortion clinics.

== Murder ==
On October 23, 1998, at approximately 10 p.m., Barnett Slepian was standing in the kitchen of his home in Amherst, New York. Kopp fired a single shot from an SKS semi-automatic rifle from a nearby wooded area, which entered the Slepian home through a rear window, striking and killing Slepian. Slepian was a well-known obstetrician/gynecologist who performed abortions at a women's clinic in Buffalo, New York. He also maintained a private medical practice in an office in Amherst, New York. Within hours of the murder, anti-abortion militants posted Slepian's name crossed out on their internet website, which also served as "a virtual hit list of doctors who carry out abortions".

== Fugitive ==
The FBI believed that Kopp received assistance in fleeing the US, although Irish anti-abortion groups denied they assisted him.

Kopp fled to Mexico under an assumed name and later to Ireland. He then fled Ireland one step ahead of police on a ferry to Brittany, France on March 12, 2001, with two Irish passports besides his original U.S. document.

=== Arrest and Extradition ===
On March 29, 2001, Kopp was arrested without incident by French law enforcement in the town of Dinan, Brittany, just after picking up a package containing $300 outside of a post office. The United States requested his extradition. Attorney General John Ashcroft promised that the death penalty would not be sought, handed down or applied, a prerequisite according to the extradition treaty between France and the United States. Ashcroft's promise was made over the objections of New York State Attorney General Eliot Spitzer and Erie County District Attorney Frank Clark, both of whom wanted the death penalty, then an option in the New York State criminal justice system. Spitzer and Clark argued that the charge of murder was a state charge, not a federal charge, and Ashcroft had no jurisdiction in the matter. The instruction chamber of the Rennes Court of Appeals ruled in favor of extradition. Kopp and his attorney, Herve Rouzaud-Le Bouef, appealed this ruling, stating that the "unsigned embassy letter was 'insufficient' as a guarantee, prompting Ashcroft's unusual direct intervention.

In May 2002, Kopp waived all possible appeals in France and returned to the U.S. in June 2002.

== Trial and conviction ==
On March 11, 2003, Kopp waived his right to a jury trial. Based upon an agreement between the defense and prosecution — Erie County Assistant District Attorney Joseph Maruszak and defense attorney Bruce Barkett — Erie County Judge Michael D'Amico would be required to find Kopp guilty or not guilty based on a single document of facts. In addition, the judge could not consider lesser charges; he had to find Kopp guilty or not guilty of second-degree murder. Kopp had confessed his role in the shooting to police, claiming he only meant to wound Slepian. D'Amico found him guilty and sentenced him to the maximum penalty, 25 years to life imprisonment, on May 9, 2003. D'Amico told Kopp "It's clear the act is premeditated; there is no doubt about it. You made an attempt to avoid responsibility for the act. What may appear righteous to you is immoral to someone else." The Appellate Division, Fourth Department, upheld the conviction on July 7, 2006 (Shawn P. Hennessy, attorney for respondent and Timothy Murphy, attorney for appellant). He is currently serving his sentence at Federal Correctional Institution, Mendota, his BOP ID being 11761-055.

== Appeals ==
Kopp filed an appeal with the United States District Court for the Western District of New York. Judge Richard Arcara was selected to preside. Arcara limited what Kopp could say on the stand and prohibited the defense from showing pictures of aborted fetuses. There are also limitations to witness' accounts. If found guilty in federal court, Kopp faced a mandatory life sentence. Kopp was charged with violating the Clinic Entrances Act and using a weapon in the murder of Slepian. Kopp chose to act as his own attorney. On the second day of the federal trial, and during cross examination, Kopp moved to have the court reporter from his previous state trial read back statements pertaining to abortion. Judge Arcara forbade this, holding that under the federal rules of evidence, Kopp was barred from stating anti-abortion, religious or moral reasoning for his actions, which effectively prevented Kopp from giving any rationale for his actions.

Kopp was also charged in the United States District Court for the Western District of New York on a count of violating the Freedom of Access to Clinic Entrances Act. Kopp dismissed his court-assigned attorney, an assistant federal public defender, and chose to represent himself. On June 20, 2007, he was sentenced to life imprisonment plus 10 years for illegal use of a firearm. Additionally, the court ordered his belongings auctioned off in order to pay $2.6 million to Slepian's family. Arcara told Kopp at the end of the trial:

You served as prosecutor, judge, jury and executioner. You decided that you know better than any law.

In his opening statement to the jury, Kopp said that although Slepian's death was "a full-bore, 100 percent tragedy" it wasn't murder because it was not malicious or premeditated. He did acknowledge that he had planned the shooting for a year, and that he fired a high-powered rifle with telescopic sights, but that he had only meant to wound the doctor (to keep him from performing abortions). Kopp claimed that murder means "Shoot them in the head, blow up a car, riddle their body with bullets like they do in the movies. That's how you kill someone."

On April 6, 2009, the 2nd U.S. Circuit Court of Appeals upheld the life sentence holding that all issues raised were without merit.

== Other possible crimes ==
It has been speculated that Kopp has committed other crimes besides killing Slepian. The FBI notes that "the shooting was similar to shootings in the Rochester, New York area, and three Canadian cities during the fall of 1997, in which abortion doctors were shot in their homes". Kopp has been charged by Canadian authorities in the 1995 shooting of an Ontario, Canada doctor, Hugh Short, one of a string of Remembrance Day Shootings. Garson Romalis and Jack Fainman were also shot and wounded by unknown assailants. An unnamed Perinton doctor was shot on October 28, 1997, the bullet narrowly missing their head. The doctor's name has been withheld by Monroe County police.

== Co-conspirators ==
Kopp received help from a sympathetic anti-abortion activist couple, a Vietnam veteran and former stage and film actor Dennis Malvasi and his wife Loretta Marra of Brooklyn, who pleaded guilty to one count each of conspiracy in helping Kopp avoid capture. Marra and Malvasi had communicated extensively with Kopp, telling him also via electronic communications that "the coast is clear", referring to his proposed secretive return to US via Canada, and also to his use of their home as a safe house. On August 21, 2003, they were sentenced to time served, and released in October that same year. The two fugitive assisters later relocated to Newark, New Jersey and briefly changed their names to Joyce Maier and Ted Barnes.

== Fictional portrayals and media ==
The murder of Barnett Slepian inspired an episode of Law and Order: Criminal Intent, "The Third Horseman", in season 1, episode 11.

Singer/songwriter Ani DiFranco wrote and performed the song, "Hello, Birmingham" about Kopp's shooting of Dr. Slepian. It is the sixth track on her tenth studio album, To The Teeth.

== See also ==
- Anti-abortion violence in the United States
- Army of God (USA)
- Christian terrorism
- Domestic terrorism in the United States
- Donald Spitz
- Paul Schenck
