= Special-interest terrorism =

Terrorism that focuses on one, or a few, issue(s)

Special-interest terrorism and single-issue terrorism are forms of terrorism that, unlike other forms such as right-wing, left-wing and religious terrorism, tend to focus on a few or only one specific issue rather than on more widespread political, religious or other social change.

Those pursuing special-interest terrorism conduct acts of violence in the belief that these will compel a society to change its attitudes toward, treatment of and/or priority given to their cause in their favour. They tend to occupy the extremist fringes of movements that address issues such as the environment, abortion and nuclear technology. Within these, it is some of the more extreme environmental and anti-abortion groups that have turned most toward vandalism and terrorist activities.

One well-known form of special-issue terrorism is environmental or eco-terrorism, which in the 1980s was the only type of special-interest terrorism included in FBI statistics. Another form of special-issue terrorism is anti-abortion violence.
