= Lake of Fire (film) =

2006 film by Tony Kaye

- Film poster
- Directed by: Tony Kaye
- Written by: Tony Kaye
- Produced by: Tony Kaye; Yan Lin Kaye
- Starring: Noam Chomsky; Alan Dershowitz; Peter Singer; Randall Terry
- Cinematography: Tony Kaye
- Edited by: Peter Goddard
- Music by: Anne Dudley
- Production company: Above the Sea
- Distributed by: TH!NKFILM
- Release dates: September 9, 2006 (TIFF); October 3, 2007
- Running time: 152 minutes
- Country: United States
- Language: English
- Budget: $6.5 million

Lake of Fire is a 2006 American documentary film directed by Tony Kaye that graphically depicts abortion in the United States. It features Noam Chomsky, Peter Singer, Alan Dershowitz, Nat Hentoff, Randall Terry and Norma McCorvey, among others. Footage of Paul Jennings Hill, who murdered physician Dr. John Britton and Britton's bodyguard James Barrett in 1994, was also featured.

The documentary was filmed entirely in black and white. It opened at the Toronto International Film Festival in September 2006.

== Critical reception ==
On Rotten Tomatoes, the film has a 94% score, based on 54 reviews with an average rating of 7.8/10. The site's critical consensus reads: "Lake of Fire's engaging interviews and powerful black-and-white visuals make for a riveting and honest documentary about a very controversial topic". Additionally, the film also holds an 83/100 score (indicating "universal acclaim") on Metacritic, based on 15 reviews. The site also gave it a "Metacritic Must-See" award.

On November 19, 2007, Lake of Fire was named by the Academy of Motion Picture Arts and Sciences as one of 15 films on its documentary feature Oscar shortlist, but it did not receive a nomination for the 80th Academy Awards.

=== Top ten lists ===
The film appeared on several critics' top ten lists of the best films of 2007.

- 3rd – Scott Foundas, LA Weekly (tied with 4 Months, 3 Weeks and 2 Days)
- 4th – Joshua Rothkopf, Time Out New York
- 4th – Ella Taylor, LA Weekly (tied with 4 Months, 3 Weeks and 2 Days)
- 6th – Scott Tobias, The A.V. Club
- 10th – Ty Burr, The Boston Globe

== See also ==
- Abortion debate
- Anti-abortion violence
- Abortion law
- Religion and abortion
- List of films shot over three or more years
