= Barnett Slepian =

American physician and murder victim

- Photo of Slepian used by the New York Daily News
- Born: Barnett Abba Slepian; April 23, 1946; Cambridge, Massachusetts, U.S.
- Died: October 23, 1998 (aged 52); Amherst, New York, U.S.
- Cause of death: Assassination by gunshot
- Education: University of Denver; Universidad Autónoma de Guadalajara
- Occupation: Physician

Barnett Abba Slepian (April 23, 1946 – October 23, 1998) was an American physician and abortion provider who was assassinated in his home by James Charles Kopp, a militant member of the US anti-abortion movement.

== Life and career ==
Slepian was born in Cambridge, Massachusetts, and raised in Rochester, New York; his grandfather was a Jewish immigrant from Russia. Slepian graduated from the University of Denver with a zoology degree. He then graduated from Universidad Autónoma de Guadalajara medical school in 1978.

Slepian worked at Buffalo Women Services in Buffalo, New York, providing abortion for members of the local and surrounding communities. He also ran his own private OB-GYN practice in Amherst, New York, where he also resided.

On October 23, 1998, Slepian had returned from synagogue, where he was attending a memorial service for his father, and was preparing soup in his kitchen when he was struck by a bullet fired through his window. The bullet shattered his spine and tore his aorta, barely missing his son's head as it exited. He died two hours later. Earlier that afternoon, Slepian's wife Lynne had forwarded a warning of potential attacks on her husband to a local police inspector.

Within days of Slepian's murder, anti-abortion groups rallied and staged clinic protests in Buffalo and Rochester, New York. While local leaders from both sides of the abortion debate decried these rallies as potential incitements to further violence, more extreme opponents of reproductive rights, such as Flip Benham of Operation Rescue, labeled calls for nonviolence "pitiful" and suggested that unless abortion was outlawed, "we are in store for more bloodshed in the streets—the likes of which will sicken even the sturdiest among us." This murder was the climax of a series of five sniper attacks in four years in northern New York and Canada. Slepian was the third doctor and up to that time the seventh person in the United States to be murdered for performing abortions.

Following Slepian's murder, Kopp fled the U.S., being placed on the FBI Top Ten Most Wanted list, but was arrested in France in 2001 and extradited. He was tried and convicted of second degree murder in Buffalo and is currently serving a 25 years to life term of imprisonment. Kopp was also convicted of federal charges and sentenced to life in prison without parole.

The Ani DiFranco song "Hello Birmingham", from her 1999 album To The Teeth, was written as a response to the Slepian murder.

== See also ==
- Anti-abortion violence in the United States
- Abortion-related violence
- David Gunn (doctor)
- Eric Robert Rudolph
- George Tiller
- Christian terrorism
- Donald Spitz
