= Christian terrorism =

Terrorist acts by groups or individuals who profess Christian motivations or goals

Christian terrorism, a form of religious terrorism, refers to terrorist acts which are committed by groups or individuals who profess Christian motivations or goals. Christian terrorists justify their violent tactics through their interpretation of the Bible and Christianity, in accordance with their own objectives and worldview.

Christian terrorism can be committed against members of other Christian denominations, adherents of other religions, secular governments, groups, individuals or society as a whole. Christianity can also be cynically misused as a rhetorical device to achieve political or military goals by terrorists.

Christian terrorist groups include paramilitary organizations, cults, and loose groups of people that might come together in order to attempt to terrorize other groups. Some groups also encourage unaffiliated individuals to commit terrorist acts. The paramilitary groups are typically tied to ethnic and political goals as well as religious goals and many of these groups have religious beliefs which are at odds with the religious beliefs of conventional Christianity.

== Terminology ==
The literal use of the phrase Christian terrorism is disputed. It appears in the academic literature to describe a large range of actions and beliefs.

Religion can be cited as the motivation for terrorism in conflicts that have a variety of ethnic, economic and political causes, such as the one in Bosnia and the Anti-balaka in the Central African Republic. In cases such as the Lord's Resistance Army or the Taiping Rebellion the beliefs of the founders differ significantly from what is recognizably Christian. In such cases the term Christian terrorism is problematic despite the claim that they are motivated by their religious beliefs.

The intimidation of minority communities along with sporadic acts of violence do not typically get referred to as terrorism. However, in 2015 a majority of Americans from the Democratic and Republican political parties thought that "attacks on abortion providers [should] be considered domestic terrorism".

== History ==
Christianity came to prominence in the Roman Empire both during and directly after the rule of Constantine the Great (324–337 AD). By this time, it had spread throughout western Asia as a minority belief, and it had become the state religion of Armenia. In early Christianity, there were many rival sects, which were collectively persecuted by some rulers. There is, however, generally no record of these early Christian groups attempting to use acts of terrorism or indiscriminate acts of violence as religious weapons, though the Donatists fought a guerilla war against the mainstream church and the state, blinding Catholic priests to make their point.

Gaining state backing by a particular Christian sect or creed led to an increase in religious violence. This form of violence took the form of persecution of adherents of rival Christian beliefs and persecution of adherents of other religions. In Europe during the Middle Ages, Christian antisemitism increased, and the Reformation and the Counter-Reformation both led to an increase in interdenominational violence. As with modern examples, it is debated as to what extent these acts were religious as opposed to ethnic or political in nature.

=== Gunpowder Plot ===
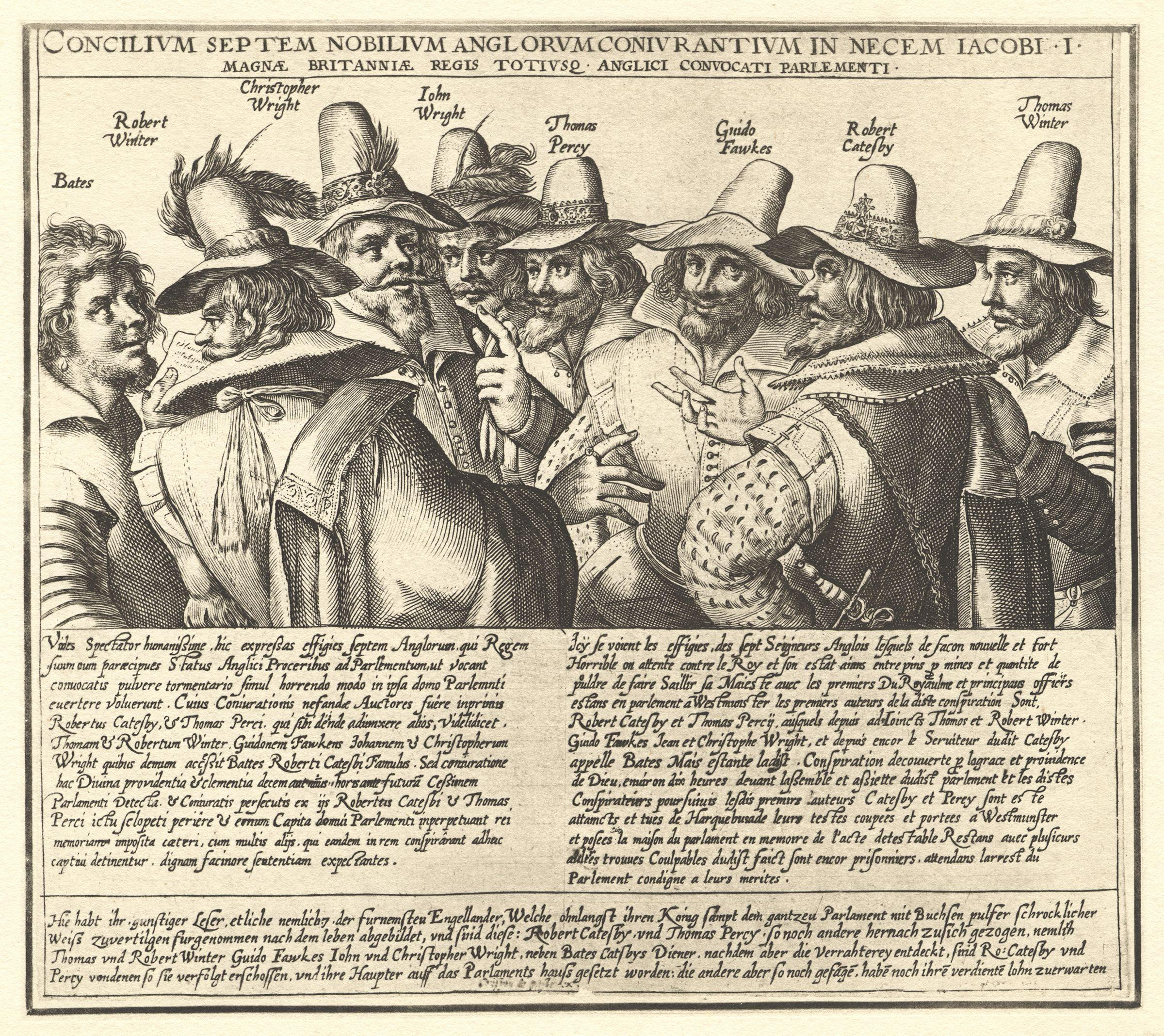
The Gunpowder Plot Conspirators (1605)

The early modern period in Britain was marked by a religious conflict which resulted from the Reformation and the recusancy that emerged in opposition to it. The Gunpowder Plot of 1605 was a failed attempt by a group of English Catholics to assassinate the Protestant King James I, and to blow up the Palace of Westminster, the English seat of government. Although the modern concept of religious terrorism, or indeed terrorism at all, had not yet come into use in the seventeenth century, David C. Rapoport and Lindsay Clutterbuck point out that the Plot, with its use of explosives, was an early precursor of nineteenth century anarchist terrorism. Sue Mahan and Pamala L. Griset classify the plot as an act of religious terrorism, writing that "Fawkes and his colleagues justified their actions in terms of religion." Peter Steinfels also characterizes this plot as a notable case of religious terrorism.

=== Pogroms ===
Eastern Orthodox Christian-influenced movements in Romania, such as the Iron Guard and Lăncieri, which Yad Vashem and Stanley G. Payne have characterized as antisemitic and fascist, respectively, were involved in the Bucharest pogrom and they also committed numerous politically motivated murders during the 1930s.

=== Ku Klux Klan ===
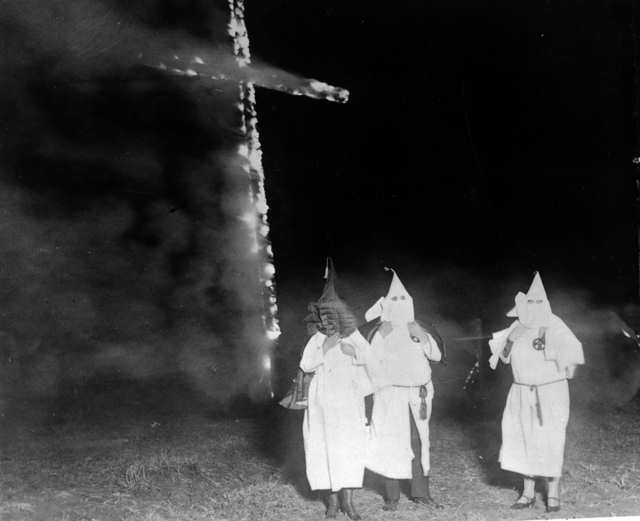
Ku Klux Klan members conduct a cross burning in Colorado, 1921.

In the late 1860s, during the Reconstruction era, former Confederate soldiers founded the original Ku Klux Klan (KKK) organization in the Southern United States. Religion did not play a role in the first Klan and it disappeared in the 1870s. However in the 1920s a new Protestant-led iteration, the second Klan, was formed during a period when racism, xenophobia, nativism, and anti-Catholicism were all widespread. This second Klan vastly expanded its geographical reach and its list of targets over those of the first Klan.

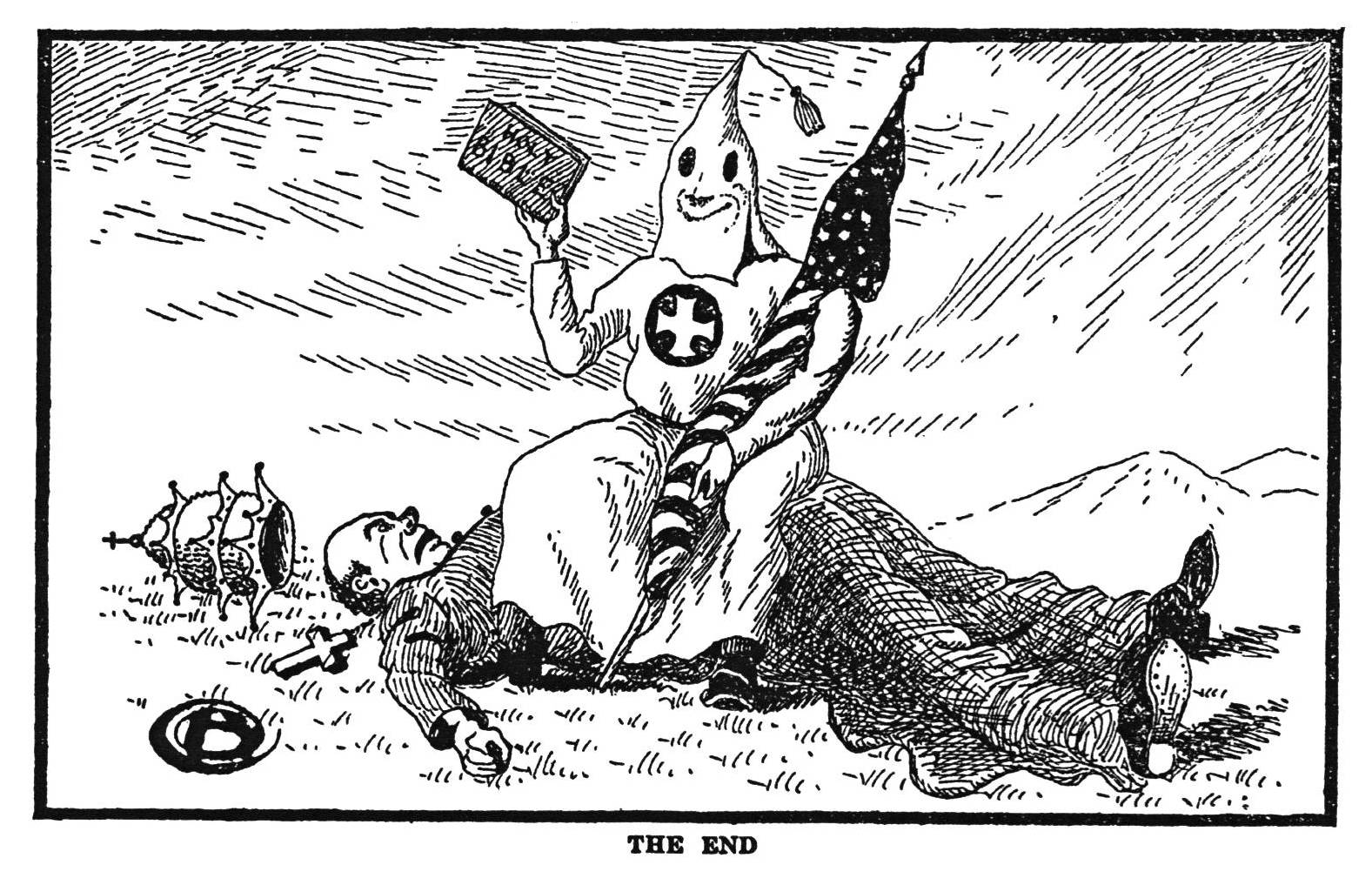
Rev. Branford Clarke's illustration in the 1926 book Klansmen: Guardians of Liberty portrays the Klan as slaying Catholic influence in the US.

Vehemently anti-Catholic, the second Klan espoused an explicitly Protestant terrorist ideology, partially basing its beliefs on a "religious foundation" in Protestantism and targeting chiefly Catholics, as well as people who engaged in "immoral" practices such as adulterers, bad debtors, gamblers, and alcohol abusers. From an early time onward, the goals of the second KKK included an intent to reestablish Protestant values in America by any means possible in opposition to the growing threat from Jews and Catholics. Although members swore to uphold Christian morality, virtually every Christian denomination officially denounced the KKK. The Second Klan lost membership rapidly after prominent leaders were identified with major crimes. There were small remnants in the 1930s and 1940s.

In the 1920s a new practice characterized the Klansmen: night-time cross burnings. Cross burning had never been a religious practice. The ritual of lighting crosses included the singing of "Onward, Christian Soldiers."

Since the 1950s, small local Klans have practiced domestic terrorism in the United States, but they have dropped the cross burnings and are not associated with any religion.

=== Origin of modern terrorism ===
Mark Juergensmeyer, a former president of the American Academy of Religion, has argued that there has been a global rise in religious nationalism after the Cold War due to the post-colonial collapse of confidence in Western models of nationalism and the rise of globalization. Juergensmeyer categorizes contemporary Christian terrorists as being a part of "religious activists from Algeria to Idaho, who have come to hate secular governments with an almost transcendent passion and dream of revolutionary changes that will establish a godly social order in the rubble of what the citizens of most secular societies regard as modern, egalitarian democracies".

According to terrorism expert David C. Rapoport, a "religious wave", or a cycle, of terrorism, dates from approximately 1979 to the present. According to Rapoport, this wave most prominently features Islamic terrorism, but it also includes terrorism by Christians and other religious groups that may have been influenced by Islamic terrorism.

=== Christchurch mosque shootings ===
On 15 March 2019, two consecutive terrorist mass shootings took place in Christchurch, New Zealand. They were committed during Friday prayer, first at the Al Noor Mosque in Riccarton, at 1:40 p.m. and almost immediately afterwards at the Linwood Islamic Centre at 1:52 p.m. Altogether, 51 people were killed and 89 others were injured, including 40 by gunfire. The perpetrator was an Australian man, Brenton Tarrant, then aged 28.

Tarrant's actions were driven by his beliefs in Christian nationalism. This perspective often includes anti-immigrant sentiments, and support for an ethno-religious homeland. In his manifesto and online posts, Tarrant described Australia and New Zealand as historically Christian lands and presented himself as defending Christian heritage against what he called a Muslim “invasion.” He referenced Crusader history, used phrases like “deus vult,” and framed the attack as protecting a Christian European civilization.

== Reason for claiming a Christian motivation ==
Numerous individuals and groups have cited their Christianity or Christian beliefs as the motivation for their terrorist acts. This can mean that they see Christianity as their identity and the main reason for their existence, partially in contrast to the identities and existence of other groups which they consider threatening and non-Christian. Terrorists can also cite their interpretation of the Bible or Christian beliefs as their motivation. All types of terrorism have a complex interrelationship with psychology and mental health; however, only a minority of terrorists have diagnosable mental illnesses. Movements and/or organizations that ultimately serve political goals, economic change, or ethnic conflict can claim to be motivated by a Christian identity or use Christian imagery in their propaganda to boost support among the public and artificially increase their perceived legitimacy, despite not truly serving a religious purpose. It is also common to have both truly religious and truly non-religious motivations, and often times the either motivation of a terrorist group are not independent and can be complexly interwoven.

=== Christianity as an identity ===
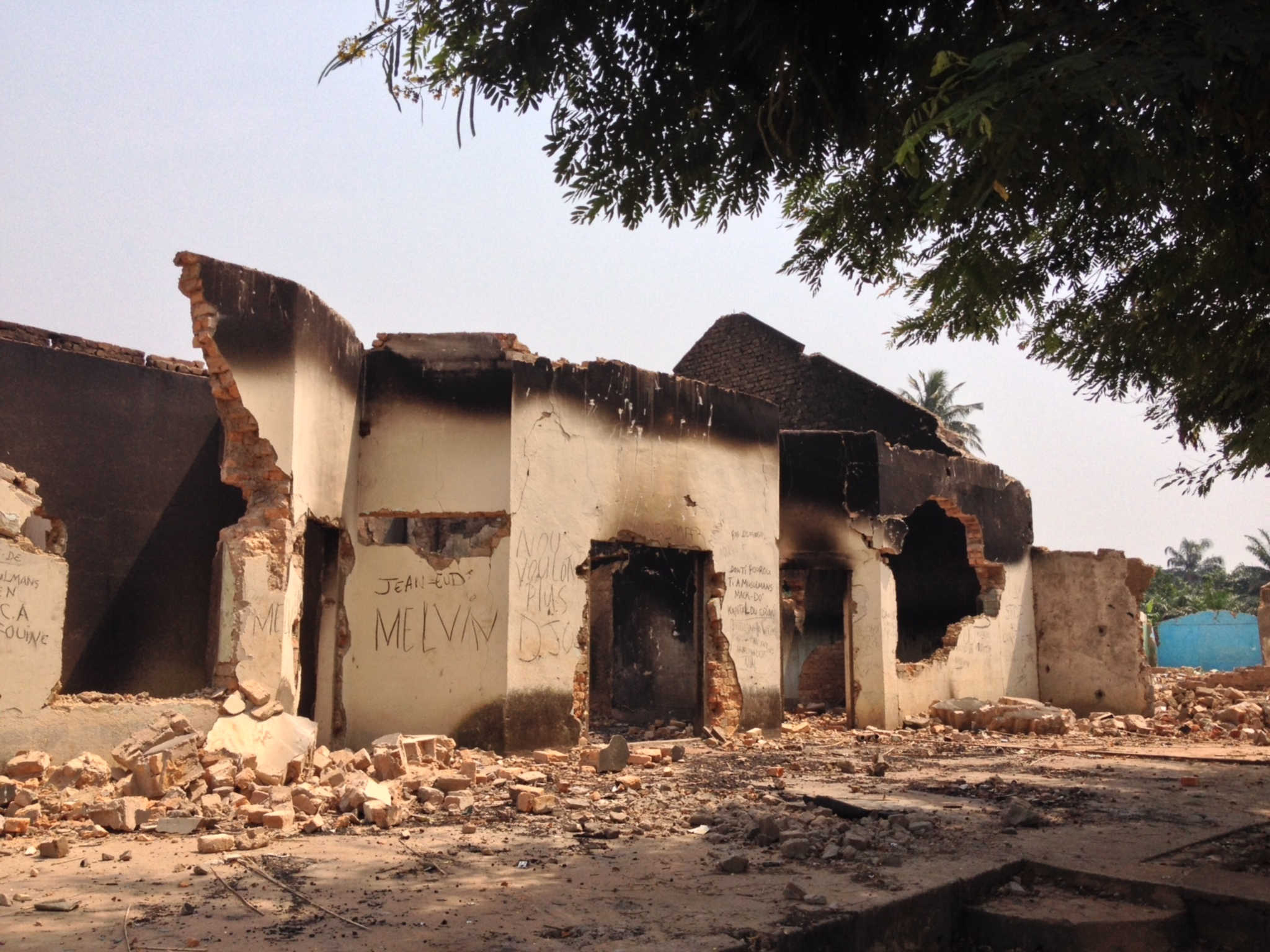
A mosque destroyed as part of anti-Muslim terrorism in Bangui, Central African Republic, December 2013

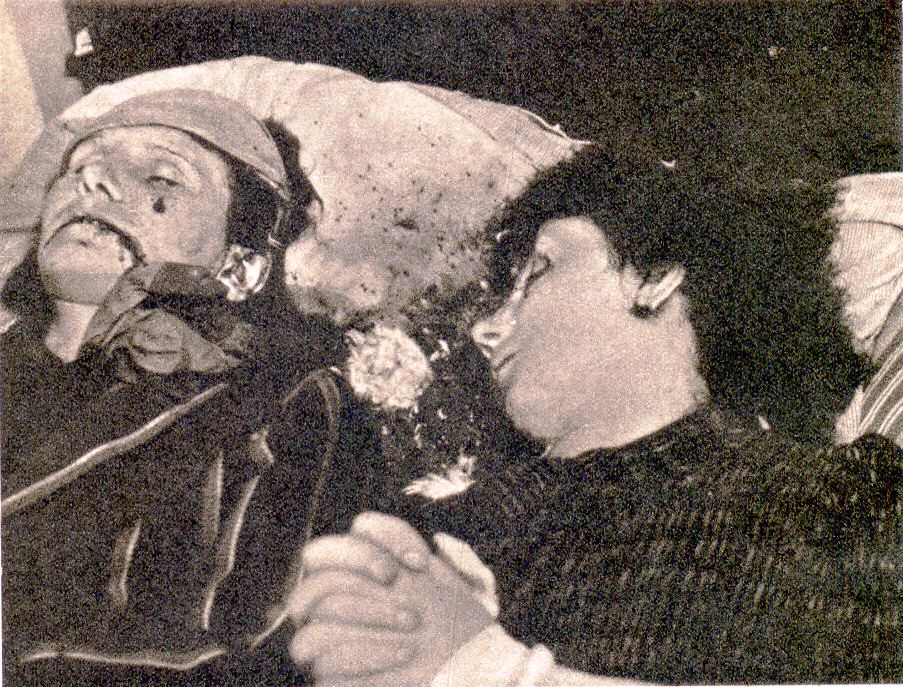
Sisters Šusterič Antonija and Frančiška, shot on August 9, 1944 in Spodnja Hrušica by the Black Hand

Religion is often closely tied to ethnic identity, economic standing and self image. Should a group of Christians feel threatened, religion is a verifiable, culturally important label to use in creating a "them-and-us" mentality. This is particularly the case where both groups share membership in a broadly similar cultural group, for example the breakup of Yugoslavia and the Lord's Resistance Army in Uganda. In situations where the opposing ethnicities are more diverse, different skin colors and/or cultural practices are sometimes used as identifiers of the other. In these cases terrorists may call themselves Christians, but they may not be motivated by any particular interpretation of Christian beliefs. In such cases Christianity is a label which reflects cultural, rather than directly ideological, influences.

This cultural Christian identity is often reinforced in the mind of the terrorist by media and governmental sources that vilify the other group or amplify its threat. This politicizing of ethno-religious tensions is a key contributor to the violence in the Central African Republic. The targets of this kind of terrorist motivation include other religions or denominations, but they can also include those who the perpetrator believes are threatening to him or her in any way, such as LGBT people or members of any group which does not conform to the perpetrator's view of who they are.

For example, Slovenian Catholic terrorist group the Black Hand assassinated hundreds of suspected communists and antifascists, allegedly with the support of the Catholic Church and Gestapo, justifying it as "defense of the faith".

When the opposing group is also Christian but belongs to a different denomination, it is often denounced as non-Christian or anti-Christian. For example, the leader of the Orange Volunteers, who described themselves as Protestant fundamentalists, defended their attacks on Catholic churches on the basis that they were "bastions of the Antichrist".

=== Interpretations of Christian morality or theology ===
Perpetrators have frequently cited Christianity as both a justification and a motivation for their actions. Typically, as with attacks on abortion clinics as well as with attacks on LGBT people, the perpetrators use doctrine from an established Church as a justification for unsanctioned acts of violence. However, they may also have a wholly individual theology that deviates from established Christian dogma.

On 12 December 2022, a fundamentalist Christian terror attack that resulted in the deaths of six people occurred in Wieambilla, Queensland, Australia. Premillennialism was cited by police as the terrorists' motivation.

=== Mental health ===
There are a wide variety of mental health conditions and illness, and it is quite rare for them to lead to violence. Objectively determining the mental health of a terrorist is often complicated by a number of factors. There is minimal statistically robust information specifically on terrorists who claim Christian motivation. However, Gill says that about 30% of right wing, 52% of single issue, and 8% of those in a terrorist group have a mental illness. Another study found that about 53% of individual terrorists could have been characterized as socially isolated before their attacks. People in some terrorist groups are less likely to have a mental illness than the general population, due to the selection criteria of such groups. Mental illness does not seem to unduly prevent terrorists from performing successful complex attacks.

== Tactics of terrorists ==
Terrorists who claim to have a Christian motivation can act alone or in groups. It is often difficult to determine if the perpetrator acted completely alone or was inspired by a religious or political group. The same problem exists with Islamic terrorism or any allegedly religiously or politically motivated act of terror.

=== Anti-abortion violence ===
On 16 July 2001, Peter James Knight walked into the East Melbourne Fertility Clinic, a private abortion provider, carrying a rifle and other weapons including 16 litres of kerosene, three lighters, torches, 30 gags, and a handwritten note that read "We regret to advise that as a result of a fatal accident involving some members of staff, we have been forced to cancel all appointments today". Knight later stated that he intended to massacre everyone in the clinic, and attack all Melbourne abortion clinics. He developed homemade mouth gags and door jambs to restrain patients and staff inside a clinic while he doused them with the kerosene. He shot 44-year-old Stephen Gordon Rogers, a security guard, in the chest, killing him. Staff and clients overpowered him soon after.

According to psychiatrist Don Sendipathy, Knight interpreted the Bible in his own unique way and he also believed in his own brand of Christianity. He believed that he needed to wage an anti-abortion crusade.

Eric Robert Rudolph (the perpetrator of the Centennial Olympic Park bombing in 1996) carried out bombing attacks on two abortion clinics and he also bombed a lesbian nightclub. Michael Barkun, a professor at Syracuse University, believes that Rudolph likely fits the definition of a Christian terrorist; however, James A. Aho, a professor at Idaho State University, is reluctant to use the phrase "Christian terrorist", so he calls Rudolph "a religiously inspired terrorist".

Dr. George Tiller, one of the few doctors in the United States who performed abortions late in pregnancies, was a frequent target of anti-abortion violence and in 2009, he was killed by Scott Roeder as he stood in the foyer of his church. At trial, Roeder admitted to killing Tiller and he said that he did it in order to protect the lives of unborn babies. He was convicted of first-degree murder and sentenced to life in prison. At his sentencing, he told the court that God "will avenge every drop of innocent blood," and he also stated that God’s judgment against the United States would "sweep over this land like a prairie wind."

Tiller was shot once before, in 1993, by Shelley Shannon, an anti-abortion activist who compared abortion providers to Hitler and said that she believed that "justifiable force" was necessary to stop abortions. Shannon was sentenced to 10 years in prison for the shooting of Tiller and she later confessed to vandalizing and burning a string of abortion clinics in California, Nevada and Oregon.

James Kopp was convicted of the murder of Dr. Barnett Slepian, an obstetrician who provided abortion services in the Buffalo area, and he has also been named as a suspect in the shooting of several abortion providers in Canada. Kopp hid in the woods behind Slepian's home in October 1998 and shot him through the window with a high-powered rifle, killing him as he stood in his kitchen with his family. He was convicted on a state charge of second-degree murder in 2003 and sentenced to serve 25 years in prison. In 2007, he was convicted on a separate federal charge and sentenced to life in prison. The Canadian authorities also consider Kopp a suspect in several nonlethal attacks on Canadian abortion service providers because they believe that he shot through the windows of their homes.

According to the Southern Poverty Law Center; "Anti-abortion violence is also deeply connected to antisemitism." Five abortion providers were killed in sniper attacks in the 1990s, out of whom four were Jewish, as was Slepian. Eric Rudolph was also known as a Holocaust denier.

The November 2015 Colorado Springs Planned Parenthood shooting, in which three people were killed and nine people were injured, was described as "a form of terrorism" by Colorado Governor John Hickenlooper. The gunman, Robert Lewis Dear, was described as a "delusional" man because on an internet forum, he had written that "sinners" would "burn in hell" during the end times. He had praised the Army of God, stating that attacks on abortion clinics are "God's work". Dear's ex-wife said that he had put glue on a lock of a Planned Parenthood clinic, and in court documents which pertained to their divorce, she said "He claims to be a Christian and is extremely evangelistic, but does not follow the Bible in his actions. He says that as long as he believes he will be saved, he can do whatever he pleases. He is obsessed with the world coming to an end."

The Army of God is an American Christian terrorist organization; its members have perpetrated acts of anti-abortion violence. Similarly, the members of the Aryan Nations, classified by Federal Bureau of Investigation (FBI) as a "terrorist threat", subscribe to the anti-abortion cause as a part of "the Holy War for the pure Aryan race." Aryan Nations is tied to cases of anti-abortion violence; for example Eric Rudolph was in contact with the group.

=== Anti-minority violence ===
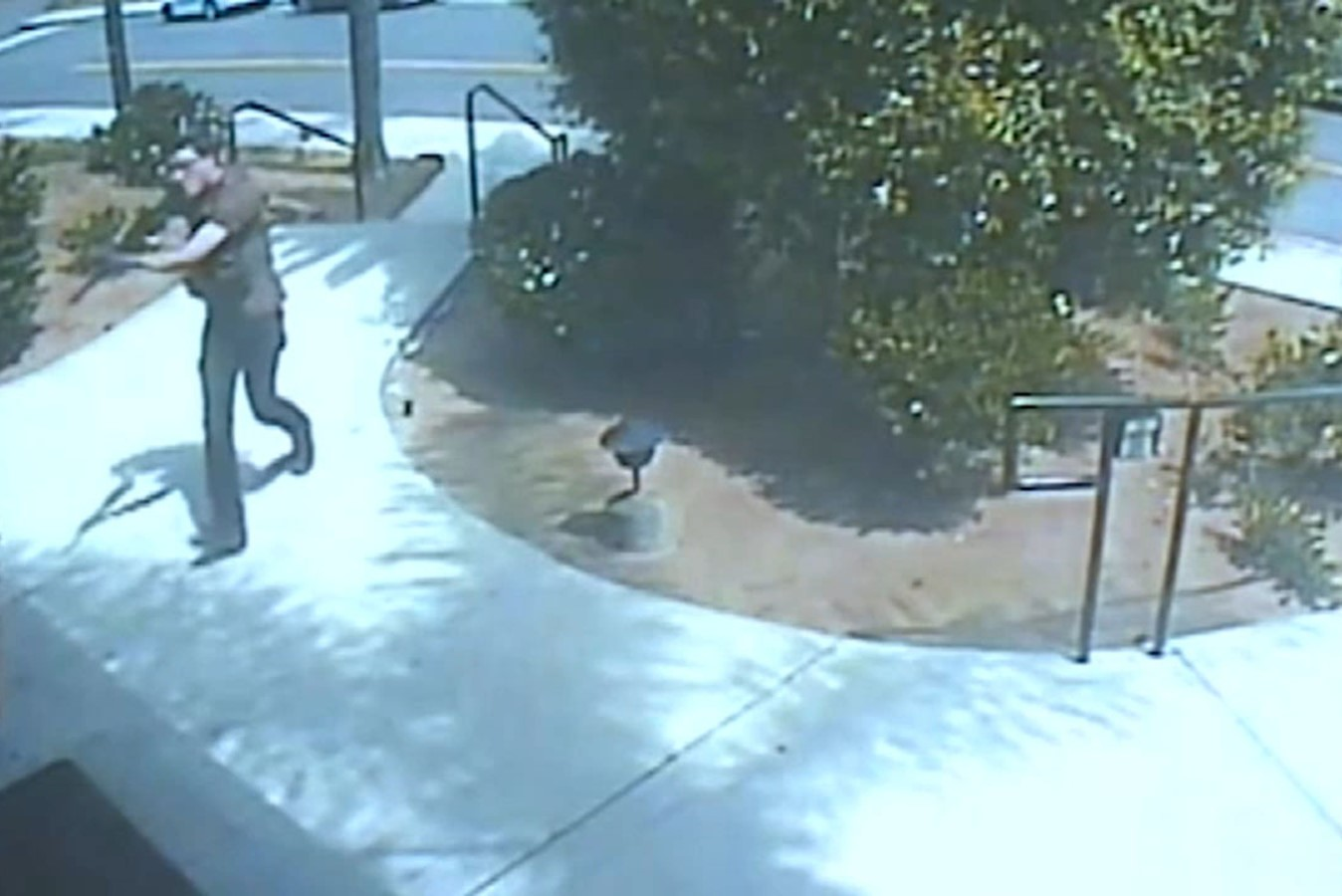
The Poway synagogue shooting perpetrator expressed Christian motives for killing Jews.

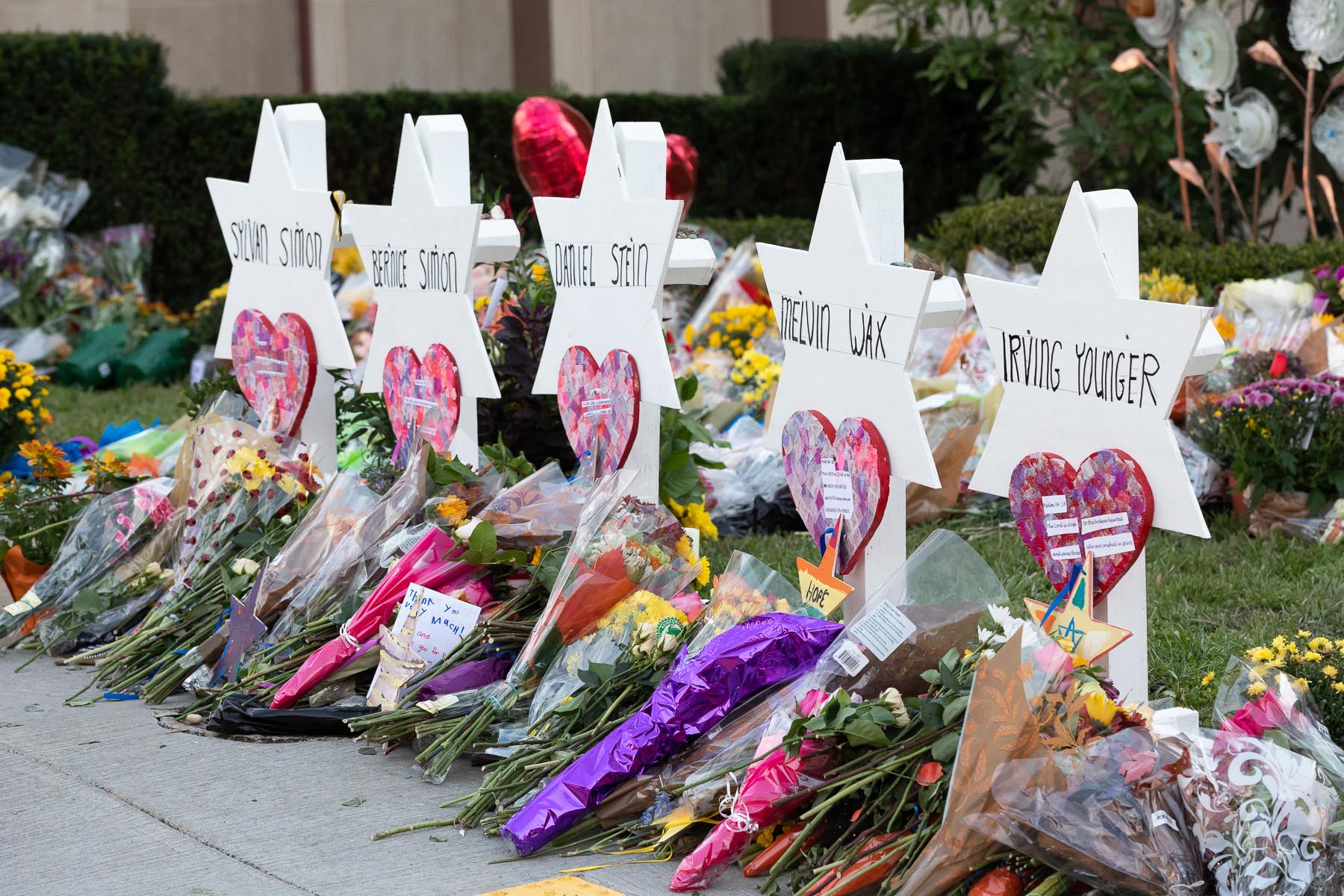
Memorial to the victims of the Pittsburgh Tree of Life synagogue shooting in 2018. The shooter had said that "Jews are the children of Satan".

Richard Wayne Snell, a member of The Covenant, the Sword, and the Arm of the Lord, shot a man presumed to be Jewish and a black police officer in 1983 and 1984 respectively. He was executed in 1995.

Gary Matson and Winfield Mowder were a gay couple from Redding, California, who were murdered by Benjamin Matthew Williams and James Tyler Williams in 1999. Neighbors said that the family of the Williams Brothers was known for its fundamentalist Christian beliefs, and they also said that recordings of sermons and religious music were frequently heard from their house. The two perpetrators of the murder are believed to have had ties to the Christian Identity movement. They were also suspected of playing a role in 18 arson attacks on three synagogues.

In 1996, three men who claimed to be Phineas priests—Charles Barbee, Robert Berry and Jay Merelle—were charged with two bank robberies and bombings at the banks, the bombing of a Spokane newspaper, and the bombing of a Planned Parenthood clinic in Washington state. The men were antisemitic Christian Identity theorists who believed that God wanted them to carry out violent attacks and they also believed that such attacks would hasten the ascendancy of the Aryan race.

Buford Furrow killed one person and wounded five others in an attack on a Jewish Community Center in California in 1999. Furrow was an adherent of Christian Identity and a security guard for Aryan Nations. Furrow said his action were "a wake-up call to America to kill Jews".

In 2015, Robert Doggart, a 63-year-old mechanical engineer, was indicted for solicitation to commit a civil rights violation by intending to damage or destroy religious property after he stated that he intended to amass weapons and attack Islamberg, an Islamic hamlet and religious community in Delaware County, New York. Doggart, a member of several private militia groups, spoke to an FBI source during a phone call and stated that he had an M4 carbine with "500 rounds of ammunition" that he intended to take to the Delaware County enclave, along with a handgun, Molotov cocktails and a machete. The FBI source recorded him saying "if it gets down to the machete, we will cut them to shreds". Doggart had previously travelled to a site in Dover, Tennessee, which had been described as a "jihadist training camp", in chain emails and found that the claims were wrong. In April, Doggart accepted a plea bargain and stated that he had "willfully and knowingly sent a message in interstate commerce containing a true threat" to injure someone. The plea bargain was struck down by a judge because it did not contain enough facts to constitute a true threat. Doggart describes himself as a Christian minister in the "Christian National (Congregational) Church" (apparently, the National Association of Congregational Christian Churches). None of the charges against him are terrorism related, however, some groups have described his actions as such.

According to University of Auckland Professor Douglas Pratt, who is an international expert on religious terrorism, the Christchurch mosque shootings by Australian Brenton Harrison Tarrant, which killed 51 people and injured 50 more people (primarily Muslims) at the Al Noor Mosque and the Linwood Islamic Centre in Christchurch, New Zealand, were a form of "Christian terrorism" and white supremacy. Tarrant's manifesto The Great Replacement, which is named after the French far-right conspiracy theory bearing the same name, quoted Pope Urban II (who ordered the First Crusade) and demanded the retaking of Jerusalem, stated Tarrant's wish that Istanbul (aka Constantinople) should be taken from Turkey so it will be back in Christian hands and he finally stated that Tarrant's main motive for the attacks was revenge against Islam. The shooter's rifles were covered with white supremacist symbols and the names of various historical non-Muslim figures who waged battles against Muslims.

The perpetrator of the Pittsburgh Tree of Life synagogue shooting, Robert Bowers, stated that "Jews are the children of Satan" on the bio of his Gab account. The Poway synagogue shooting suspect John T. Earnest cited Bible quotes to justify his attack.

== See also ==
- Christian Identity
- Christianization
- Criticism of Christianity
- European wars of religion
- Religious discrimination
- Religious violence
- Witch-hunt
- Phineas Priesthood

== Bibliography ==
- Michael Gaddis.2005. There Is No Crime for Those Who Have Christ: Religious Violence in the Christian Roman Empire: 39 (Transformation of the Classical Heritage). University of California Press.
- Mason, Carol. 2002. Killing for Life: The Apocalyptic Narrative of Pro-Life Politics. Ithaca: Cornell University Press.
- Zeskind, Leonard. 1987. The 'Christian Identity' Movement, [booklet]. Atlanta, Georgia: Center for Democratic Renewal/Division of Church and Society, National Council of Churches.
- Al-Khattar, Aref M. Religion and terrorism: an interfaith perspective. Greenwood. January 2003. ISBN 978-0-275-96923-3
- "The Armies of God: A Study in Militant Christianity" by Iain Buchanan, Publisher: Citizens International (2010), ISBN 978-9833046096
- Introduction: The Enduring Relationship of Religion and Violence – Oxford Handbooks Online
