= Murder of David Gunn =

Anti-abortion murder in Florida

David Gunn
- Born: David Lomond Gunn; November 16, 1945; Tennessee, U.S.
- Died: March 10, 1993 (aged 47); Pensacola, Florida, U.S.
- Cause of death: Gunshot wounds
- Education: Vanderbilt University; University of Kentucky
- Occupation: Physician

On March 10, 1993, Dr. David Gunn was fatally shot by anti-abortion extremist Michael Frederick Griffin in Pensacola, Florida. It was the first documented killing of an obstetrics and gynaecology doctor where the stated intention of the perpetrator was to prevent a doctor from providing abortion care.

A jury deliberated three hours before finding Griffin guilty on March 4, 1994. He was sentenced to 25 years to life in prison, which he is serving at Blackwater River Correctional Facility in Milton, Florida. In November 2017, the Florida Commission on Offender Review set Griffin's tentative release date for March 4, 2043, when he will be 81.

== Persons involved ==
David Gunn (November 16, 1945 – March 10, 1993) was an American physician. He received his bachelor's degree from Vanderbilt University and earned his M.D. at the University of Kentucky. Gunn moved to Brewton, Alabama, after his residency, choosing to provide OB/GYN and abortion services in the rural United States.

Michael Frederick Griffin
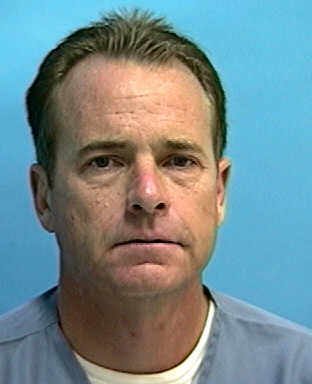
- Griffin's FDOC photo
- Born: September 11, 1961 (age 65); United States
- Status: Incarcerated in the Blackwater River Correctional Facility
- Motive: Anti-abortion extremism
- Conviction: First degree murder
- Penalty: Life imprisonment

Michael Frederick Griffin was 31 years old at the time of the shooting. The New York Times described Griffin as "a fundamentalist Christian and a loner with a bad temper".

== Shooting ==
On March 10, 1993, anti-abortion protesters had been demonstrating in front of Gunn's Pensacola Women's Medical Services clinic. Griffin waited outside, then ambushed Gunn by shooting him three times in the back with .38 pistol, shouting "Don't kill any more babies" before opening fire. Griffin did not deny his actions after shooting Gunn and told police "We need an ambulance."

== Aftermath ==
Griffin claimed to be acting on behalf of God. During his trial, Griffin's lead defense attorney, Robert Kerrigan, argued that anti-abortion activist John Burt had brainwashed Griffin and drove him to commit murder. At the time, Burt was the Northwest Florida regional director of the national anti-abortion group Rescue America. Burt was also a former member of the Ku Klux Klan and self-professed "spiritual adviser" to a group of extremists who had bombed three abortion clinics in 1984. A jury deliberated three hours before finding Griffin guilty of first degree murder on March 4, 1994.

The murder was one of the motivating factors in the passing in 1994 of the federal Freedom of Access to Clinic Entrances Act. From March 1993 through May 2009, Gunn was the first of a total of four doctors murdered by anti-abortion extremists. Others killed were doctors Barnett Slepian, John Britton and George Tiller. Gunn's murder also prompted Paul Jennings Hill to issue the Defensive Action Statement, signed by 30 anti-abortion leaders, which stated their belief that the killing of doctors who provide abortions was justified. Hill went on to murder physician John Britton and Britton's bodyguard in 1994.

== Cultural references ==
In 1994, Gunn's murder inspired the first official single "Get Your Gunn" by alternative metal band Marilyn Manson. The lead singer, Marilyn Manson, explained in a 1999 Rolling Stone op-ed piece on the Columbine High School Massacre, that to him, Gunn's murder by "pro-life" activists was the ultimate hypocrisy he had witnessed as a young adult.

== See also ==
- Anti-abortion violence in the United States
- Abortion in the United States
- Joe Scarborough
