= American Family Planning =

Coordinates: 30°29′20″N 87°13′38″W

American Family Planning, formerly known as The Ladies Center and as Community Healthcare Center, was a clinic in Pensacola, Florida, providing abortions and other women's healthcare services. It is notable as the site of a number of acts of anti-abortion violence.

Perhaps best-known was the 1994 murder of Dr. John Britton. Britton was a physician working at the clinic; he and his escort James Barrett were shot to death as they arrived on July 29 by anti-abortion protester Paul Jennings Hill. Barrett's wife June was also wounded. Previously, the clinic had been bombed twice in 1984; a pipe bomb destroyed the building on June 25 of that year, and four youths—Matt Goldsby, Jimmy Simmons, Kathy Simmons, and Kaye Wiggins—bombed it on Christmas Day, calling the crime "a gift to Jesus on his birthday." These bombers stated that they were also behind the June bombing.

On January 1, 2012, Bobby Joe Rogers firebombed the clinic with a Molotov cocktail; the fire gutted the building. Rogers told investigators that he was motivated to commit the crime by his opposition to abortion, and that what more directly prompted the act was seeing a patient enter the clinic during one of the frequent anti-abortion protests there.

It was shuttered by the Florida Agency for Health Care Administration in 2022 after multiple clients had parts of their internal organs removed and had to be hospitalized.
