= Peter Knight (murderer) =

Anti-abortion activist and convicted murderer

Peter James Knight
- Born: 1 January 1954 (age 72); Bathurst, New South Wales, Australia
- Status: Incarcerated
- Motive: Anti-abortion extremism
- Conviction: Murder
- Penalty: Life imprisonment; with a minimum non-parole period of 23 years

Peter James Knight (born 1 January 1954) is an Australian criminal who murdered a security guard at an abortion clinic in Melbourne. Following his conviction at a criminal trial, Knight is serving a life sentence with a minimum non-parole period of 23 years.

== Early years and background ==
Knight was one of six children born into a Roman Catholic family in Bathurst, New South Wales.

In the years leading up to the incident, he led a hermit's life in an "off-the-grid" bush camp in the Killanbutta State Forest near Molong. He frequently attended anti-abortion rallies in Sydney and Melbourne. Knight was also opposed to smoking, smokers, tobacco companies, and the taking of oaths.

== Murder ==
On 16 July 2001, Knight walked into the East Melbourne Fertility Clinic, a private abortion provider, carrying a rifle and other weapons, including 16 imp gal (73 L; 19 US gal) of kerosene, three lighters, torches, 30 gags, and a handwritten note that read: "We regret to advise that as a result of a fatal accident involving some members of staff, we have been forced to cancel all appointments today". He developed home-made mouth gags and door stops to imprison all patients and staff inside the clinic while he doused them with the kerosene. Knight later said that he intended to massacre the 15 staff and 26 patients at the clinic, and attack all Melbourne abortion clinics.

Once inside, he shot and killed 44-year-old Stephen Gordon Rogers, a security guard, after which he was overpowered by clients and staff.

== Legal proceedings ==
For many weeks after his arrest, Knight refused to answer questions or cooperate with the police investigation. Due to his isolated life, Victorian Police were unable to confirm his identity until three months after his arrest, even though photographs of him were published in major newspapers. According to psychiatrist Don Sendipathy, Knight interpreted the Bible in his own unique way and believed in his own brand of Christianity.

Choosing to not obtain legal representation, Knight was found guilty by a jury and, on 19 November 2002, he was sentenced to life in prison, with a minimum non-parole period of 23 years. Knight will be aged in his 70s before being eligible for parole. On 14 May 2003, Knight lodged an appeal against his conviction, but it was dismissed because it was not lodged within fourteen days of his sentence, as required under the law. He is currently serving his sentence in HM Prison Barwon, near Geelong.

== See also ==
- Abortion in Australia
