= Paul Jennings Hill =

American minister and anti-abortion terrorist

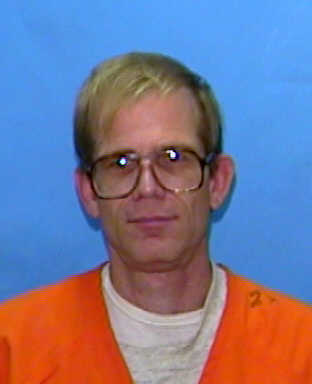
- Hill's FDOC photo
- Born: February 6, 1954; Miami, Florida, U.S.
- Died: September 3, 2003 (aged 49); Florida State Prison, Florida, U.S.
- Occupation: Minister (defrocked)
- Spouse: Karen Demuth Hill
- Children: 3
- Status: Executed by lethal injection
- Motive: Anti-abortion violence
- Convictions: First degree murder (2 counts); Attempted first degree murder Shooting or throwing a deadly missile
- Penalty: Death

Details
- Date: July 29, 1994
- Country: United States
- Location: Pensacola, Florida
- Target: John Britton
- Killed: Dr. John Bayard Britton, 69; James Herman Barrett, 74
- Injured: June Barrett, 68
- Weapon: Mossberg Model 500A 12-gauge pump-action shotgun

Paul Jennings Hill (February 6, 1954 – September 3, 2003) was an American minister and anti-abortion activist who murdered physician John Britton and Britton's bodyguard, retired Air Force Lieutenant Colonel James Barrett, in 1994. Hill was sentenced to death by lethal injection and was executed on September 3, 2003.

== Early life ==
Paul Hill was born in Miami, Florida, on February 6, 1954, to Oscar Jennings Hill, an airline pilot, and his wife Louise. He was raised in Coral Gables, Florida and attended Coral Gables Senior High School.

At the age of 17, Hill was charged with the assault of his father when his parents attempted to get him treatment for his drug problem. Hill said he experienced a religious conversion two years later, in 1973, after being sent to a military school. Hill later enrolled in Belhaven University, where he met his future wife, Karen Demuth, with whom he had three children.

== Early career ==
Hill graduated from Reformed Theological Seminary, where he studied under Greg Bahnsen, a founder of the right-wing Christian Reconstructionist movement. He attended St. Paul Presbyterian Church, which espoused theonomy, a movement related to Reconstructionism. Following his ordination in 1984, Hill became a minister affiliated with both the Presbyterian Church in America and the Orthodox Presbyterian Church. He was excommunicated in 1993 following a number of nationally televised appearances in which he claimed to be the new national spokesperson for "defensive action" against abortion providers and claimed a connection to the Army of God.

== Crime, trial, and execution ==
Prior to his excommunication, Hill looked towards other means to support his family, having seen his eight years in ministry as "fruitless". After moving to Pensacola, Florida, he purchased a franchise for a mobile business that performed cleaning, trim repair, touch-up paint and pinstripe services for new and used car dealerships. This offered him flexible work hours in order to pursue his anti-abortion protest activities. However, Hill's client base substantially dwindled as more of his radical views became public.

On July 29, 1994, Hill approached the Ladies Center, an abortion clinic in Pensacola. When he spotted clinic doctor John Britton and his bodyguard, retired USAF Lieutenant Colonel James H. Barrett, outside the clinic, he fired on both of them at close range with a Mossberg Model 500A 12-gauge pump-action shotgun. Both Britton and Barrett died; Barrett's wife, June, was also wounded. Afterwards, Hill laid his shotgun on the ground and waited to be arrested.

Following his arrest, Hill was brought to trial in the Circuit Court of Florida for the First Circuit, charged with two counts of first degree murder, one count of attempted first degree murder, and one count of shooting into an occupied vehicle. Hill moved, successfully, to be allowed to appear pro se; i.e., he represented himself. He pleaded not guilty on all counts. Hill's motion to use the affirmative defense of justification was denied. According to Hill, his actions were a defensive act, rather than a retribution. On October 5, 1994, Hill was found guilty on all counts. On December 6, he was sentenced to death. Appeals to the First District Court of Appeal, 656 So.2d 1271 (Fla. 1995), and subsequently to the Florida Supreme Court, 688 So.2d 901 (Fla.1996), were unsuccessful. Hill petitioned the Supreme Court of the United States for writ of certiorari (asking the Court to hear his appeal). The petition was denied. 522 U.S. 907 (1997). After losing his automatic appeals, Hill decided to waive the remainder of his appeals.

The execution warrant for Hill was not signed until July 2003, at which time it was signed by Governor Jeb Bush. Hill died by lethal injection in Florida State Prison on September 3, 2003, aged 49. His last words were, "If you believe abortion is a lethal force, you should oppose the force and do what you have to do to stop it. May God help you to protect the unborn as you would want to be protected."

Hill chose Rev. Donald Spitz as his spiritual adviser during the last week of his life. Spitz is spokesperson for the Army of God, an anti-abortion Christian terrorist organization that has been identified as such by the Department of Justice and Department of Homeland Security. Hill was close friends with Spitz both before and after he killed John Britton and James H. Barrett. Spitz was with Hill during the last week of his life and with Hill when he was executed.

== Motives and aftermath ==
Prior to the murders, Hill sent two position papers to Reconstructionist author Gary North, which set out Hill's views of abortion and why he considered murder of abortion care providers to be warranted. The papers were followed by three additional letters to North in October 1994. North's responses, issued after the murders, comprised two letters that were made available to the public. The letters rejected and refuted Hill's theological arguments, and concluded that, "...the public will regard your dual assassination as the act of a condemned man outside of God's church and acting on his own in defiance of Bible-revealed law and therefore also God's moral law."

Hill spent almost a decade in prison awaiting his execution. In a statement made before his execution, Hill's views on the murders remained unchanged; he said that he felt no remorse for his actions, and that he expected "a great reward in Heaven". Hill left behind a manuscript manifesto which his backers promised him they would publish. Hill also encouraged others who believe abortion is an illegitimate use of lethal force to "do what you have to do to stop it."

== In media ==
While in police custody, Hill told the media "Now is the time to defend the unborn as to defend a slave that's about to be murdered." Hill's purported ties to the Army of God movement as well as his life and crimes were explored in the 2000 feature-length HBO documentary Soldiers in the Army of God.

Lake of Fire, a 2006 documentary by Tony Kaye on the abortion controversy in the United States, features footage of Hill protesting outside abortion clinics in Florida, and shows footage of Hill's arrest and trial. Hill also says to the filmmaker that "whatever force is justified in defending the life of a born child is also justified in defending the life of an unborn child."

== See also ==
- Anti-abortion violence
- David Trosch (1935–2012), Roman Catholic priest and Hill supporter
- Eric Rudolph (born 1966), American domestic terrorist and bomber, partially in opposition to abortion on demand
- Shelley Shannon (born 1956), American anti-abortion extremist and attempted murderer
- Volunteer (capital punishment)
- List of people executed in Florida
- List of people executed in the United States in 2003
