= John Britton (doctor) =

American physician and murder victim (1925–1994)

- Born: John Bayard Britton; May 6, 1925; Boston, Massachusetts, U.S.
- Died: July 29, 1994 (aged 69); Pensacola, Florida, U.S.
- Cause of death: Assassination by gunshot
- Education: University of Virginia School of Medicine
- Occupation: Physician
- Known for: Performing abortions

John Bayard Britton (May 6, 1925 – July 29, 1994) was an American physician. He was assassinated in Pensacola, Florida, by anti-abortion extremist Paul Jennings Hill. Britton's death was the second assassination of a Pensacola abortion provider in under a year and a half; he had replaced Dr. David Gunn after the latter's 1993 murder by another anti-abortionist.

Born in Boston, Britton graduated in 1949 from the University of Virginia School of Medicine. He then served in the US Army stationed in Korea, Mainz and Frankfurt, Germany, and became a lieutenant. He also taught at the Medical College of Georgia. He then became a family physician in Fernandina Beach, Florida, spending much of his time delivering babies.

After Gunn's murder, Britton began flying across the state to Pensacola weekly to do abortions at the Pensacola Ladies' Center. Because he had received harassment and death threats, he wore a homemade bulletproof vest, carried a .357 Magnum, and enlisted volunteer bodyguards.

Britton was notably ambivalent about abortion. He viewed it as a last resort option and sometimes turned away women seeking an abortion, telling them to think about the decision and come back in a week if they still wanted an abortion. However, he described anti-abortion protesters as "fanatics."

== Assassination and trial ==
As Britton arrived at the clinic on July 29, 1994, Hill approached and fired at him with a twelve-gauge shotgun, hitting him in the head and killing him. Hill later stated that he aimed for Britton's head because he suspected the doctor was wearing a bulletproof vest. Hill also killed Britton's bodyguard, a retired Air Force lieutenant colonel, James Herman Barrett Jr, and wounded Barrett's wife, June, a retired nurse. The murders resulted in several members of Congress calling for the FBI to infiltrate anti-abortion groups, as it had with the Ku Klux Klan.

Hill was sentenced to death on December 6, 1994, and executed by lethal injection on September 3, 2003. He was the first person in the United States to be executed for murdering a doctor who performed abortions.

In a piece several months earlier in GQ, Tom Junod had profiled a number of parties involved in the murders: not only Britton, but also Hill and the Barretts. Britton and Hill are also interviewed in Tony Kaye's documentary Lake of Fire, which was released in 2006.
