= Atlanta bombing =

Atlanta bombing may refer to:

- Hebrew Benevolent Congregation Temple bombing (1958)
- Centennial Olympic Park bombing (1996)
- Otherside Lounge bombing (1997)

== See also ==
- Atlanta shooting (disambiguation)
- Crime in Atlanta
