= Richard Jewell =

American law enforcement officer (1962–2007)

- Born: Richard White; December 17, 1962; Danville, Virginia, U.S.
- Died: August 29, 2007 (aged 44); Woodbury, Georgia, U.S.
- Occupations: Security guard; police officer; deputy sheriff
- Known for: Alerting the police and public prior to the Centennial Olympic Park bombing during the 1996 Summer Olympics in Atlanta, Georgia, saving the lives of hundreds of attendees in the process, and then being falsely accused of the bombing
- Spouse: Dana Jewell (m. 1998)

Richard Allensworth Jewell (born Richard White; December 17, 1962 – August 29, 2007) was an American security guard and law enforcement officer who alerted police during the Centennial Olympic Park bombing at the 1996 Summer Olympics in Atlanta, Georgia. He discovered a backpack containing three pipe bombs on the park grounds and helped evacuate the area before the bomb exploded, saving many people from injury or death. For months afterward he was suspected of planting the bomb, resulting in adverse publicity that "came to symbolize the excesses of law enforcement and the news media".

Initially hailed by the media as a hero, Jewell was soon considered a suspect by the Federal Bureau of Investigation (FBI) based on psychological profiling. Though never charged, Jewell experienced what was described as a "trial by media", which took a toll on his personal and professional life. He was cleared as a suspect after 88 days of intense public scrutiny. In 2005, Eric Rudolph confessed and pled guilty to that bombing and other attacks.

Jewell's life has been the subject of popular culture, including the 2019 film Richard Jewell directed by Clint Eastwood and the ten-episode 2020 season of the anthology series Manhunt, Deadly Games.

== Early life ==
Jewell was born Richard White in Danville, Virginia, the son of Robert Earl White, who worked for Chevrolet, and his mother Bobi, an insurance claims coordinator. Richard's birth parents divorced when he was four. When his mother later married John Jewell, an insurance executive, his stepfather adopted him.

== Olympic bombing accusation ==
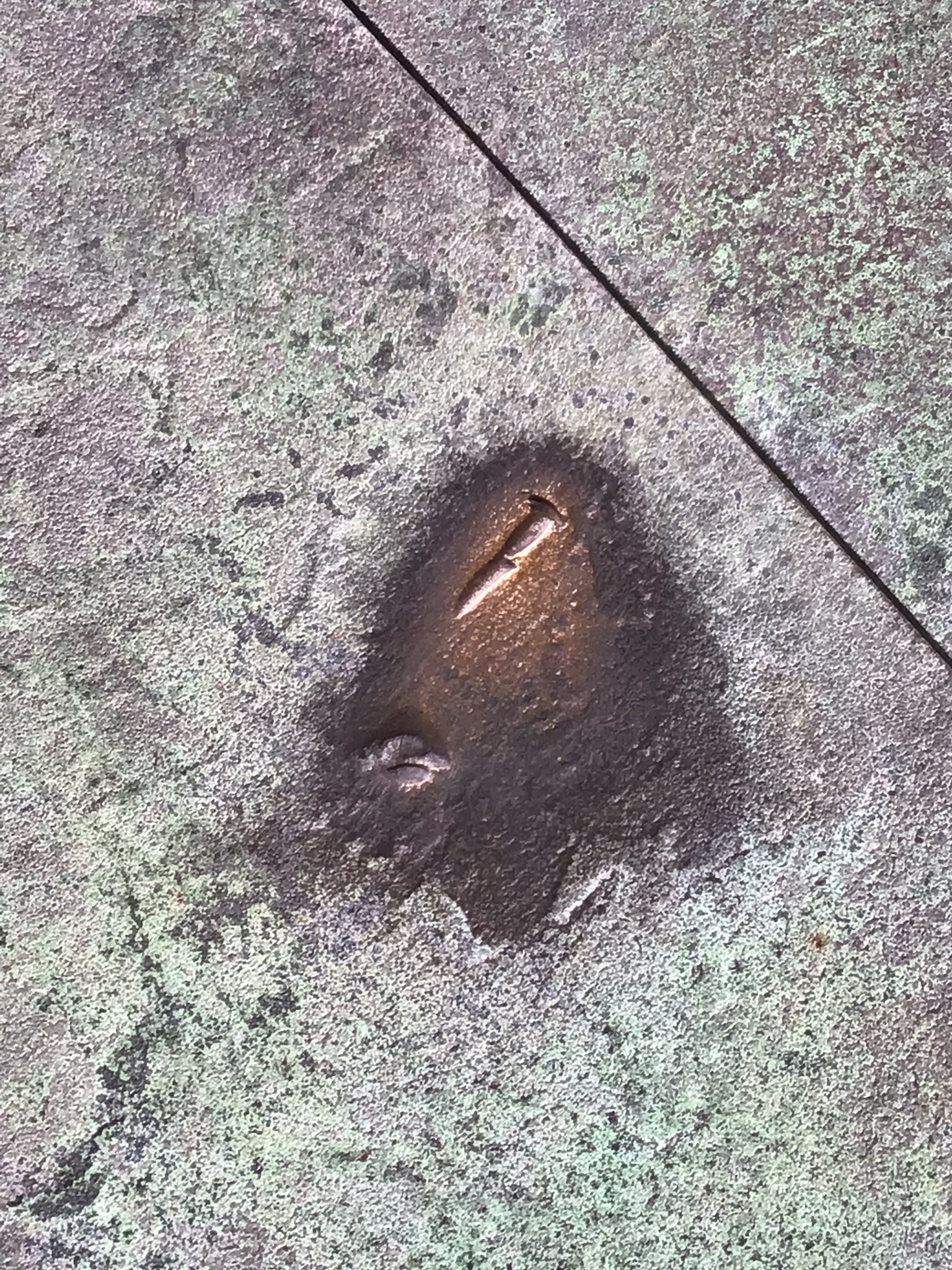
A piece of shrapnel from the bombing imprinted into a sculpture at the Centennial Olympic Park

Centennial Olympic Park was designed as the "town square" of the Olympics, and thousands of spectators had gathered for a late concert. Sometime after midnight on July 27, 1996, Eric Robert Rudolph, a domestic terrorist who would later bomb a lesbian nightclub and two abortion clinics, placed a green backpack containing a shrapnel-laden pipe bomb under a bench. Jewell was working as a security guard for the event. He discovered the bag and alerted Georgia Bureau of Investigation officers. This discovery was nine minutes before Rudolph telephoned 911 to deliver a warning. During a Jack Mack and the Heart Attack performance, Jewell and other security guards began clearing the immediate area so that a bomb squad could investigate the suspicious package. The bomb exploded 13 minutes later, killing one person—later identified as Alice Hawthorne—and injuring more than 100 others. A cameraman, Melih Uzunyol, also died of a heart attack while running to photograph the incident.

=== Investigation and the media coverage ===
Early news reports lauded Jewell as a hero for helping to evacuate the area after he spotted the suspicious package. Three days later, The Atlanta Journal-Constitution revealed in an article by Kathy Scruggs and Ron Martz that the FBI was treating him as a possible suspect, based largely on a "lone bomber" criminal profile. For the next several weeks, the news media focused aggressively on him as the presumed culprit, describing him as a "person of interest". The media, to varying degrees, described Jewell as a failed law enforcement officer who might have planted the bomb so he could "find" it and be a hero.

The New York Times reported in October 1996, when he was cleared as a suspect, that "a number of law-enforcement officials have said privately for months that they thought Mr. Jewell had been involved in the bombing, even though there was no evidence against him and some evidence seemed to rule him out".

Jewell was never charged officially, but the FBI thoroughly and publicly searched his home twice, questioned his associates, investigated his background, and maintained 24-hour surveillance of him. The scrutiny began to ease only after Jewell's attorneys hired an ex-FBI agent to administer a polygraph, which Jewell passed.

A Justice Department investigation of the FBI's conduct found that the FBI had tried to cause Jewell to waive his constitutional rights by telling him he was participating with a training movie about bomb detection, although the report concluded "no intentional violation of Mr. Jewell's civil rights and no criminal misconduct" had occurred.

=== Exoneration ===
On October 26, 1996, the U.S. Attorney in Atlanta, Kent Alexander, sent Jewell a letter saying "based on the evidence developed to date ... Richard Jewell is not considered a target of the federal criminal investigation into the bombing on July 27, 1996, at Centennial Olympic Park in Atlanta". The letter did not include an apology, but in a separate statement issued by Alexander, the U.S. Justice Department regretted the leaking of the investigation.

The separately issued statement said that Jewell "endured highly unusual and intense publicity that was neither designed nor desired by the FBI, and in fact interfered with the investigation," and that "The public should bear in mind that Richard Jewell has at no time been charged with any crime in connection with the bombing, and the property that was seized pursuant to court-authorized search warrants has been returned." The New York Times reported that the statement was "highly unusual" because "it was a tacit admission by Federal officials that they had been wrong in their suspicion of Mr. Jewell".

At a press conference in July 1997, U.S. Attorney General Janet Reno expressed personal regret concerning the leak that resulted in intense media scrutiny of Jewell. She said, "I'm very sorry it happened. I think we owe him an apology. I regret the leak."

In 1998, Eric Rudolph was named as a suspect in the Centennial Park bombing and the bombings of abortion clinics. He was arrested in 2003 after a lengthy manhunt. Rudolph later agreed, in April 2005, to plead guilty to the Centennial Park bombing and other attacks on an abortion clinic and a lesbian nightclub, as part of a plea bargain to avoid the death penalty.

In 2006, Georgia Governor Sonny Perdue honored Jewell for his rescue efforts during the attack, and publicly thanked him for saving people's lives. Perdue said Jewell "deserves to be remembered as a hero".

== Subsequent life, career and public appearances ==
Jewell worked in various law enforcement jobs, including as a police officer in Pendergrass, Georgia. He worked as a deputy sheriff in Meriwether County, Georgia, until his death. He also gave speeches at colleges. On July 30, 1997, Jewell testified before a subcommittee of the U.S. House of Representatives calling for an independent investigation into methods used by FBI agents during their investigation of him. He appeared in Michael Moore's 1997 documentary The Big One. He had a cameo appearance in the September 27, 1997, episode of Saturday Night Live, in which he jokingly fended off suggestions that he was responsible for the deaths of Mother Teresa and Diana, Princess of Wales, both of which had occurred earlier that year.

Jewell married Dana Jewell in 1998; they remained married until his death. The couple relocated to a farm they bought together, south of Atlanta. In 2001, Jewell was honored as the Grand Marshal of Carmel, Indiana's Independence Day Parade. Jewell was chosen in keeping with the parade's theme of "Unsung Heroes". On each anniversary of the bombing until his illness and eventual death, he privately placed a rose at the Centennial Olympic Park scene where spectator Alice Hawthorne died.

Three FBI agents were disciplined afterward by the Department of Justice. Agents Woody Johnson and David Tubbs were censured, and agent Don Johnson was suspended for five days without pay. Jewell's lawyer called the punishments a "whitewash" and said "These agents should be terminated."

== Libel cases ==
After he was dismissed as a suspect, Jewell filed libel suits against NBC News, The Atlanta Journal-Constitution, CNN, the New York Post, and Piedmont College.

Jewell sued The Atlanta Journal-Constitution because, according to Jewell, the paper's headline ("FBI suspects 'hero' guard may have planted bomb") "pretty much started the whirlwind." In one article, the Journal-Constitution compared Jewell's case to that of serial killer Wayne Williams. The newspaper was the only defendant that did not settle with Jewell. The lawsuit remained pending for several years, having been considered at one time by the Supreme Court of Georgia, and had become an important part of case law regarding whether journalists could be forced to reveal their sources. Jewell's estate continued to press the case even after his death in 2007, but in July 2011, the Georgia Court of Appeals ruled for the defendant. The Court concluded that "because the articles in their entirety were substantially true at the time they were published—even though the investigators' suspicions were ultimately deemed unfounded—they cannot form the basis of a defamation action."

Although CNN settled Jewell's libel suit for an undisclosed monetary amount, CNN maintained that its coverage had been "fair and accurate".

Jewell sued NBC News for this statement made by Tom Brokaw: "The speculation is that the FBI is close to making the case. They probably have enough to arrest him right now, probably enough to prosecute him, but you always want to have enough to convict him as well. There are still some holes in this case." Even though NBC stood by its story, the network agreed to pay Jewell $500,000. Jay Leno also apologized during a Tonight Show episode on October 28, 1996.

On July 23, 1997, Jewell sued the New York Post for $15 million in damages, contending that the paper portrayed him in articles, photographs, and an editorial cartoon as an "aberrant" person with a "bizarre employment history" who was probably guilty of the bombing. He eventually settled with the newspaper for an undisclosed amount.

Jewell filed suit against his former employer Piedmont College, its president Raymond Cleere, and college spokesman Scott Rawles. Jewell's attorneys contended that Cleere telephoned the FBI and spoke to the Atlanta newspapers, providing them with false information on Jewell and his employment there as a security guard. Jewell's lawsuit accused Cleere of describing Jewell as a "badge-wearing zealot" who "would write epic police reports for minor infractions." The college settled for an undisclosed amount.

In 2006, Jewell stated that the lawsuits were focused on vindicating his reputation rather than financial gain, highlighting that the vast majority of the settlements were allocated to legal fees and taxes.

== Media portrayals ==
Richard Jewell, a biographical drama film, was released in the United States on December 13, 2019. Directed and produced by Clint Eastwood, the film was written by Billy Ray; the screenplay was adapted from the 1997 article "American Nightmare: The Ballad of Richard Jewell," by Marie Brenner, and the 2019 book The Suspect: An Olympic Bombing, the FBI, the Media, and Richard Jewell, the Man Caught in the Middle by Kent Alexander and Kevin Salwen. Jewell was portrayed by Paul Walter Hauser, while Kathy Bates played his mother Bobi, for which she earned an Academy Award for Best Supporting Actress nomination.

The second season of the television crime drama anthology series Manhunt, also known as Manhunt: Deadly Games, depicted the story of the Centennial Park bombing and other bombs planted by Eric Robert Rudolph. Jewell was portrayed by Cameron Britton.

== Death ==
Jewell was diagnosed with type 2 diabetes in February 2007 and suffered kidney failure and other medical problems related to his diagnosis in the ensuing months. His wife, Dana, found him dead on the floor of their bedroom when she came home from work on August 29, 2007; he was 44 years old. An autopsy found the cause of death to be severe heart disease with diabetes and related obesity complications as a contributing factor.
