= Eric Rudolph =

American domestic terrorist (born 1966)

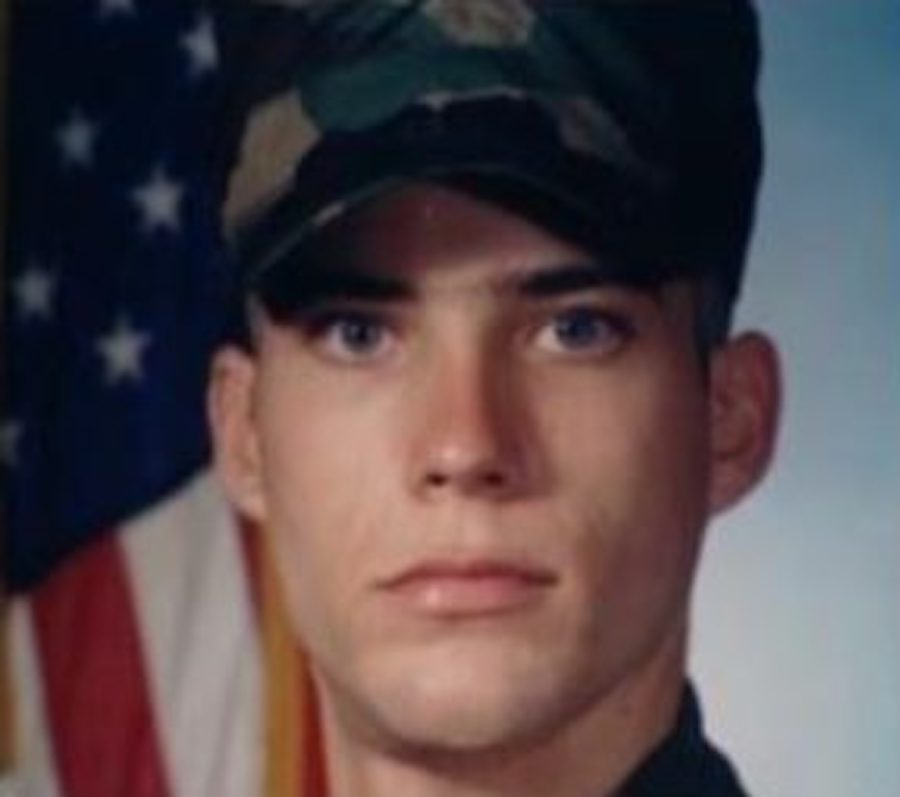
- Rudolph in the U.S. Army c. 1987–1989

FBI Ten Most Wanted Fugitive
- Alias: Bob Randolph, Robert Randolph, Bobby Rudolph

Description
- Born: Eric Robert Rudolph; September 19, 1966 (age 60); Florida, U.S.
- Occupation: Carpenter; roofer; handyman

Status
- Convictions: Maliciously damaging by means of an explosive a building and property used in an activity affecting interstate commerce resulting in death Using a destructive device during a crime of violence
- Penalty: Four consecutive life sentences without the possibility of parole
- Added: May 5, 1998
- Caught: May 31, 2003
- Number: 454
- Captured

Eric Rudolph
- Years active: July 27, 1996 – January 29, 1998
- Motive: Right-wing terrorism; Anti-abortion violence; Lesbophobia; Anti-socialism

Details
- Country: United States
- Locations: Atlanta, Birmingham
- Killed: 2
- Injured: 117
- Weapon: Pipe bombs

Eric Robert Rudolph (born September 19, 1966), also known as the Olympic Park Bomber, is an American domestic terrorist convicted of a series of bombings across the Southern United States between 1996 and 1998, which killed two people and injured over 100 others, including the Centennial Olympic Park bombing at the 1996 Summer Olympics in Atlanta. His stated motive was opposition to "the ideals of global socialism" and "abortion on demand", both of which he claimed were condoned by the United States government. Rudolph was listed as one of the FBI Ten Most Wanted Fugitives for five years, until he was caught in 2003.

In 2005, as part of a plea bargain, Rudolph pled guilty to numerous state and federal homicide charges and accepted four consecutive life sentences in exchange for avoiding a trial and a potential death sentence. He remains incarcerated at the ADX Florence supermax prison near Florence, Colorado.

== Early life ==
Rudolph was born in Florida. After his father Robert died in 1981, when Rudolph was 15 years old, he moved with his mother and siblings to Nantahala, Macon County, in western North Carolina.

Rudolph attended ninth grade at the Nantahala School but dropped out after that year and worked as a carpenter with his older brother Daniel. When Rudolph was 18, he spent time with his mother at a Christian Identity compound in Schell City, Missouri, known as the Church of Israel.

After Rudolph received his GED, he enlisted in the U.S. Army, undergoing basic training at Fort Benning in Georgia. He was discharged in January 1989, due to marijuana use, while serving with the 101st Airborne Division at Fort Campbell, Kentucky. In 1988, the year before his discharge, Rudolph had attended the Air Assault School at Fort Campbell. He attained the rank of Specialist/E-4.

Rudolph joined several white supremacist groups in the years before he went to the Army of God and perpetrated the bombings.

== Bombings ==
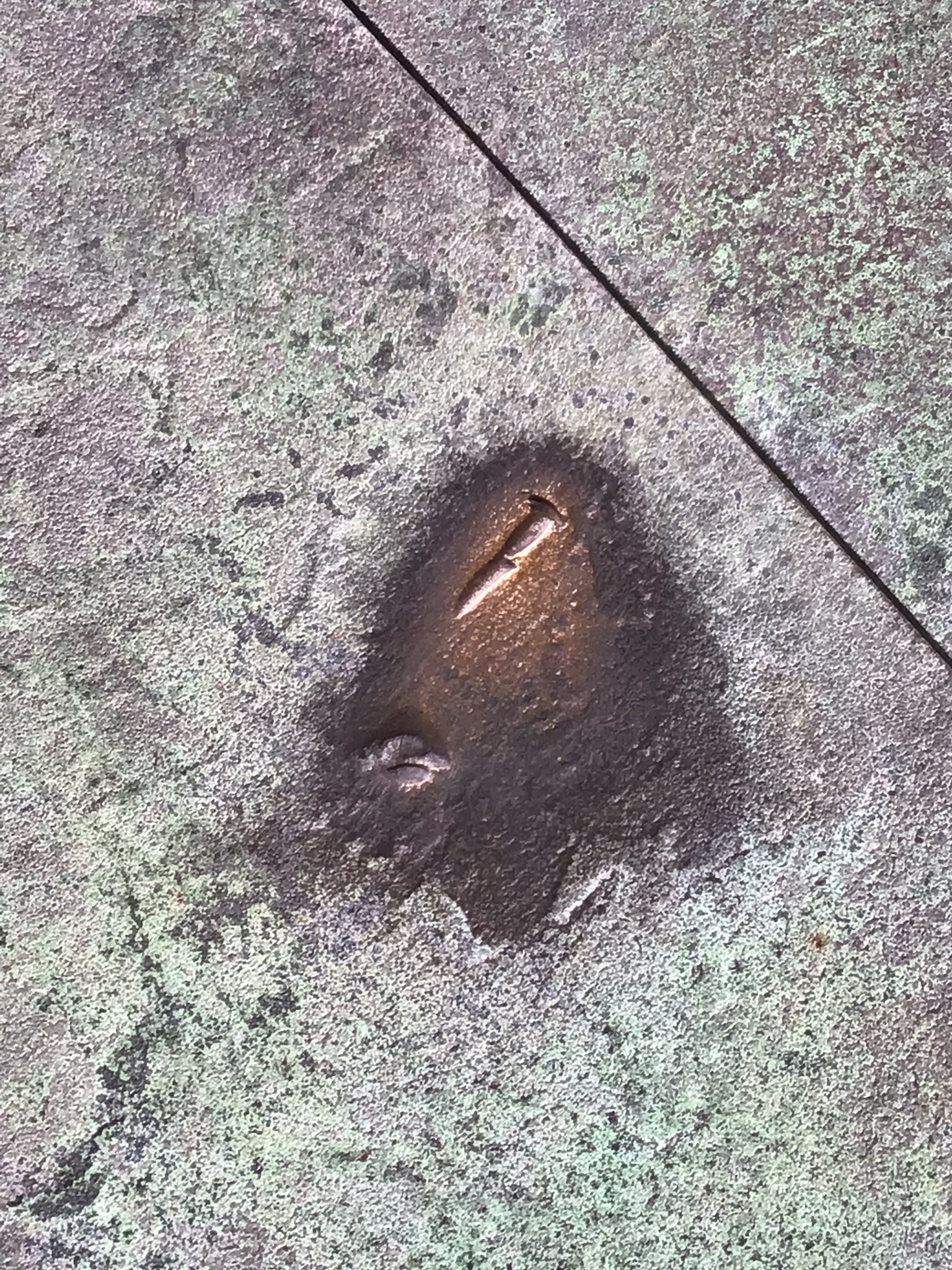
A piece of shrapnel from Rudolph's bombing imprinted into a sculpture at the Centennial Olympic Park

At age 29, Rudolph perpetrated the Centennial Olympic Park bombing in Atlanta, which occurred on July 27, 1996, during the 1996 Summer Olympics. He made two anonymous 911 calls, warning about the bomb before it detonated. The blast killed one spectator and wounded 111 others. A 40-year-old Turkish news cameraman suffered a fatal heart attack while running to the scene.

Rudolph's motive for the bombing, according to his April 13, 2005, statement, was political:

In the summer of 1996, the world converged upon Atlanta for the Olympic Games. Under the protection and auspices of the regime in Washington millions of people came to celebrate the ideals of global socialism. Multinational corporations spent billions of dollars, and Washington organized an army of security to protect these best of all games. Even though the conception and the purpose of the so-called Olympic movement is to promote the values of global socialism as perfectly expressed in the song "Imagine" by John Lennon, which was the theme of the 1996 Games—even though the purpose of the Olympics is to promote these ideals, the purpose of the attack on July 27 was to confound, anger and embarrass the Washington government in the eyes of the world for its abominable sanctioning of abortion on demand. The plan was to force the cancellation of the games, or at least create a state of insecurity in order to empty the streets around the venues and thereby eat into the vast amounts of money that had been invested in them.

Rudolph's statement cleared Richard Jewell, a Centennial Olympic Park security guard, of any involvement in the bombing. Despite having been initially hailed as a hero for being the first one to spot Rudolph's explosive device and helping to clear the area, Jewell came under FBI scrutiny in the days following the attack, ultimately becoming the prime suspect and the subject of international media attention.

Rudolph confessed to three other bombings: 1) an abortion clinic in the Atlanta suburb of Sandy Springs on January 16, 1997, 2) the Otherside Lounge of Atlanta, a lesbian bar, on February 21, 1997, injuring five, and 3) an abortion clinic in Birmingham, Alabama, on January 29, 1998, killing Birmingham police officer Robert Sanderson, who was off-duty but working as security in uniform, and critically injuring nurse Emily Lyons. Rudolph's bombs contained nails, which acted as shrapnel.

== Fugitive ==
Rudolph was first identified as a suspect in the Alabama bombing by the Department of Justice in February 1998, following tips from two witnesses, Jeffrey Tickal and Jermaine Hughes. Tickal and Hughes observed Rudolph departing the scene and noted his appearance and truck license plate. He was named as a suspect in the other Atlanta and Alabama incidents in October.

On May 5, 1998, he became the 454th fugitive listed by the FBI on the Ten Most Wanted list. The FBI considered him to be armed and extremely dangerous, and offered a $1 million reward for information leading directly to his arrest. He spent more than five years in the Appalachian wilderness as a fugitive, during which time federal and amateur search teams scoured the area without success.

Rudolph's family supported him and believed he was innocent of all charges. They were questioned and placed under surveillance. On March 7, 1998, Rudolph's older brother, Daniel, videotaped himself cutting off his left hand with a radial arm saw in order to, in his words, "send a message to the FBI and the media." The hand was successfully reattached later by surgeons. According to Rudolph's own writings, he survived during his years as a fugitive by camping in the Nantahala National Forest near Cherokee and Graham Counties, in North Carolina, by gathering acorns and salamanders, pilfering vegetables from gardens, stealing grain from a grain silo, and raiding dumpsters in Murphy, North Carolina.

== Arrest and guilty plea ==
Rudolph was arrested in Murphy, North Carolina, on May 31, 2003, by rookie police officer Jeffrey Scott Postell of the Murphy Police Department while Rudolph was looking through a dumpster behind a Save-A-Lot store at about 4:00 a.m. Postell, on routine patrol, had initially suspected a burglary in progress.

Rudolph was unarmed and did not resist arrest. When arrested, he was clean-shaven with a trimmed mustache, had dyed black hair and wore a camouflage jacket, work clothes, and new sneakers. Federal authorities charged him on October 14, 2003. Rudolph was initially defended by attorney Richard S. Jaffe. After Jaffe withdrew, he was represented by Judy Clarke.

In April 2005, the Department of Justice announced that Rudolph had agreed to a plea bargain under which he would plead guilty to all charges he was accused of in exchange for avoiding the death penalty. The deal was confirmed after the FBI found 250 pounds (110 kg) of dynamite he had hidden in the forests of North Carolina. His revealing the hiding places of the dynamite was a condition of his plea agreement. He made his pleas in person in Birmingham and Atlanta courts on April 13.

Rudolph released a statement explaining his actions; he rationalized the bombings as serving the cause of anti-abortion and anti-gay terrorism. In his statement, he claimed that he had "deprived the government of its goal of sentencing me to death," and that "the fact that I have entered an agreement with the government is purely a tactical choice on my part and in no way legitimates the moral authority of the government to judge this matter or impute my guilt."

The terms of the plea agreement were that Rudolph would be sentenced to four consecutive life terms. He was sentenced July 18, 2005, to two consecutive life terms without parole for the 1998 murder of a police officer. He was sentenced for his bombings in Atlanta on August 22, 2005, receiving two consecutive life terms. That same day, Rudolph was sent to the ADX Florence Supermax federal prison. Like other Supermax inmates, he spends 23 hours per day alone in his 80-square-foot (7.4-square-meter) concrete cell.

Rudolph unsuccessfully tried to have part of his sentence vacated in 2021.

== Motivations ==
After Rudolph's arrest for the bombings, The Washington Post reported that the FBI considered Rudolph to have "had a long association with the Christian Identity movement, which asserts that Northern European whites are the direct descendants of the lost tribes of Israel, God's chosen people." Christian Identity is a white supremacist movement which holds the view that those who are not white Christians cannot be saved. In the same article, the Post reported that some FBI investigators believe that Rudolph may have written letters in which he claimed responsibility for the nightclub and abortion clinic bombings on behalf of the Army of God, a group that sanctions the use of force to combat abortions and is associated with Christian Identity.

In a statement released after he entered a guilty plea, Rudolph denied being a supporter of the Christian Identity movement, claiming that his involvement amounted to a brief association with the daughter of a Christian Identity adherent, later identified as Daniel Gayman. When asked about his religion he said "I was born a Catholic, and with forgiveness I hope to die one." In other written statements, Rudolph has cited biblical passages and offered religious motives for his militant opposition to abortion.

Some books and media outlets, like the NPR radio program On Point, have described Rudolph as a "Christian Identity extremist"; Harper's Magazine referred to him as a "Christian terrorist". The Voice of America reported that Rudolph could be seen as part of an "attempt to try to use a Christian faith to try to forge a kind of racial and social purity." Writing in 2004, authors Michael Shermer and Dennis McFarland saw Rudolph's story as an example of "religious extremism in America," warning that the phenomenon he represented was "particularly potent when gathered together under the umbrella of militia groups".

The Anti-Defamation League noted in 2003 that "extremist chatter on the Internet has praised Rudolph as 'a hero' and some followers of hate groups are calling for further acts of violence to be modeled after the bombings he is accused of committing."

In a letter to his mother from prison, Rudolph has written, "Many good people continue to send me money and books. Most of them have, of course, an agenda; mostly born-again Christians looking to save my soul. I suppose the assumption is made that because I'm in here I must be a 'sinner' in need of salvation, and they would be glad to sell me a ticket to heaven. I do appreciate their charity, but I could really do without the condescension. They have been so nice I would hate to break it to them that I really prefer Nietzsche to the Bible." His mother would state she saw this as evidence of his intellectual side, not as a denial of his Catholic faith.

Rudolph has said, "The truth is I am a Christian". Rudolph remained unremorseful for his actions and, in a statement before the court, called his acts against abortion providers a "moral duty." "As I go to a prison cell for a lifetime, I know that ‘I have fought a good fight, I have finished my course, I have kept the faith,’" Rudolph said, quoting scripture. In his work "White Lies: Abortion, Eugenics, And Racism" Rudolph expresses his admiration for Catholicism.

== Writings from prison ==
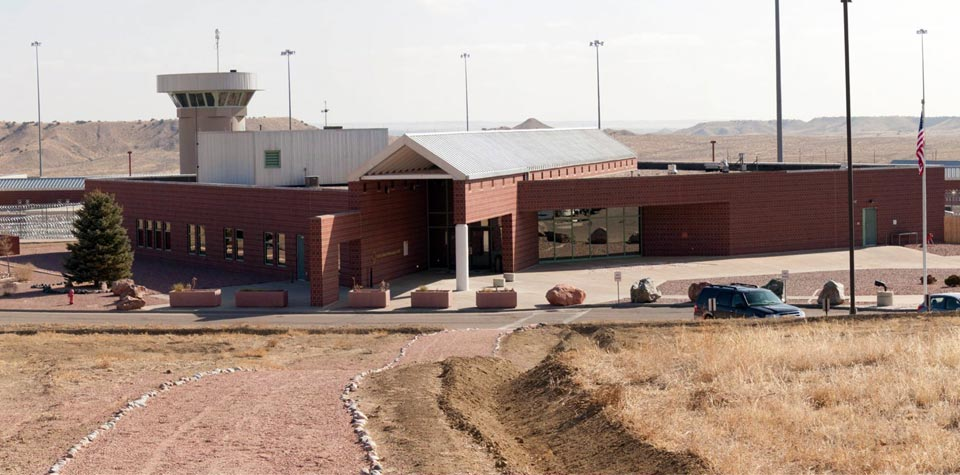
Rudolph is incarcerated at ADX Florence.

Essays written by Rudolph that condone violence and militant action have been published on the Internet by an Army of God anti-abortion activist. Although victims maintain that Rudolph's messages are harassment and could incite violence, the prison can do little to restrict their publication, according to Alice Martin, who was the U.S. Attorney for the Northern District of Alabama when Rudolph was prosecuted for the Alabama bombing. "An inmate does not lose his freedom of speech," she said.

As reported in an April 8, 2013, Alabama blog article, Rudolph's book Between the Lines of Drift: The Memoirs of a Militant was published, with help from his brother, by Lulu.com in February 2013. In April 2013, the U.S. attorney general seized $200 to help pay off the $1 million that Rudolph owes in restitution to the state of Alabama. The book has since been republished and has been made available through the Army of God website.

== See also ==
- Anti-abortion violence
- Army of God (militant organization)
- Christian terrorism
- Forensic linguistics
- Former FBI Ten Most Wanted Fugitives
