= Marie Brenner =

American journalist (born 1949)

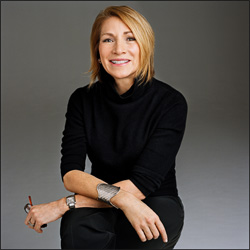
- Marie Brenner
- Born: Marie Harriet Brenner; December 15, 1949 (age 76); San Antonio, Texas, U.S.
- Occupations: Author, investigative journalist
- Spouses: Jonathan Schwartz (m. 1979; div. 1984) Ernest Harold Pomerantz (m. 1985)
- Children: 1
- Relatives: Anita Brenner (aunt)

Marie Harriet Brenner (born December 15, 1949) is an American author, investigative journalist, and writer-at-large for Vanity Fair. She has also written for New York, The New Yorker and the Boston Herald and has taught at Columbia University's Graduate School of Journalism. Her 1996 Vanity Fair article on tobacco insider Jeffrey Wigand, "The Man Who Knew Too Much", inspired the 1999 movie The Insider, starring Russell Crowe and Al Pacino. Her February 1997 Vanity Fair article "American Tragedy: The Ballad of Richard Jewell" partially inspired the 2019 film Richard Jewell directed by Clint Eastwood.

== Career ==
Brenner earned a bachelor of fine arts degree from the University of Texas at Austin and received a master of arts degree from New York University Film School. She was the first female baseball columnist covering the American League, traveling with the Boston Red Sox for the Boston Herald during the 1979 season. Brenner worked as a contributing editor for New York magazine from 1980 to 1984, and covered the royal wedding of Prince Charles and Lady Diana Spencer.

Brenner joined Vanity Fair as a special correspondent in 1984. She left the magazine in 1992 to become a staff writer at The New Yorker, returning to Vanity Fair in 1995 as writer-at-large. Her 1996 article for Vanity Fair on Jeffrey Wigand and the tobacco wars, titled "The Man Who Knew Too Much", was made into the 1999 feature film The Insider, starring Russell Crowe and Al Pacino, and directed by Michael Mann. It was nominated for seven Academy Awards, including Best Picture.

In 2012, Brenner penned a piece entitled "Marie Colvin's Private War" for Vanity Fair. This article was later adapted into the film A Private War, directed by first-time director Matthew Heineman and starring Academy Award-nominated actress, Rosamund Pike. Pike was nominated for Best Actress in a Motion Picture - Drama at the 76th Golden Globe Awards, while Heineman was recognized with a nomination from the Directors Guild of America with a nomination for Outstanding Directorial Achievement of a First-Time Feature Film Director.

In 1997, she wrote an article for Vanity Fair on Richard Jewell, the security guard hailed as a hero, then incorrectly suspected, of the Olympic Park bombing in 1996. Titled "American Tragedy: The Ballad of Richard Jewell", it was, along with the 2019 book The Suspect: An Olympic Bombing, the FBI, the Media, and Richard Jewell, the Man Caught in the Middle by Kent Alexander and Kevin Salwen, the basis of the 2019 film Richard Jewell.

Brenner's 2002 Vanity Fair article, "The Enron Wars", delving into the investigation into the Enron scandals, made national news when Senator Peter Fitzgerald used it to question witnesses testifying before a Senate committee.

In 2009, the Manhattan Theater Club announced that it had commissioned Alfred Uhry to adapt Brenner's memoir Apples and Oranges: My Brother and Me, Lost and Found for the stage.

In 2020, Brenner was granted 18-month access to the New York Presbyterian hospital, depicted in her book The Desperate Hours: One Hospital's Fight to Save a City on the Pandemic's Front Lines, published in 2022.

An archive of Brenner's work is stored at the Howard Gotlieb Archival Research Center at Boston University.

== Incident with Donald Trump ==
During a black-tie gala at Tavern on the Green in 1991, Donald Trump poured a glass of wine down Brenner's suit because she had written an unflattering piece about him earlier that year.

== Personal life ==
Brenner was born December 15, 1949, in San Antonio, Texas, to Milton Conrad Brenner and Thelma (Long) Brenner. She grew up in San Antonio and moved to New York City in 1970.

Her father was chairman of Solo Serve Corporation, a chain of Texas discount stores started by her grandfather Isidor Brenner. Isidor, born in 1872, was a Jewish emigrant to Texas from the Duchy of Kurland (in modern Latvia), in 1892. He married Paula, a Jewish emigrant from Riga, Latvia, by way of Chicago. The couple moved their family back and forth between Mexico and Texas during the first years of the Mexican Revolution, finally settling the family in San Antonio, in 1916.

She is the niece of Anita Brenner, anthropologist, author, and one of the first women to be a regular contributor to The New York Times. She had an older brother Carl, a lawyer turned apple farmer who was the focus of her memoir, Apples and Oranges: My Brother and Me, Lost and Found.

== Published works ==
- Tell Me Everything, New York: New American Library, 1976. ISBN 978-0451076854, OCLC 5898486
- Going Hollywood: An Insider's Look at Power and Pretense in the Movie Business, New York: Delacorte Press, 1978. ISBN 978-0440030188, OCLC 3186647
- Intimate Distance, New York: William Morrow and Co., 1983. ISBN 978-0688021375, OCLC 1084921214
- House of Dreams: The Collapse of an American Dynasty, London: Joseph, 1988. ISBN 978-0718132477, OCLC 9672879
- Great Dames: What I Learned from Older Women, New York: Three Rivers Press, 2000. ISBN 978-0609807095, OCLC 47051999
- Apples and Oranges: My Brother and Me, Lost and Found, New York: Picador, 2008. ISBN 978-0312428808, OCLC 1084679418
- A Private War: Marie Colvin and Other Tales of Heroes, Scoundrels and Renegades, London: Simon & Schuster, UK Ltd. 2018. ISBN 978-1471180705, OCLC 1040537511
- The Desperate Hours: One Hospital's Fight to Save a City on the Pandemic's Front Lines, New York: Flatiron Books. 2022. ISBN 978-1250805737.
