= Richard Jewell (film) =

2019 American biographical drama film by Clint Eastwood

- Theatrical release poster
- Directed by: Clint Eastwood
- Screenplay by: Billy Ray
- Based on: "American Nightmare: The Ballad of Richard Jewell" by Marie Brenner; The Suspect: An Olympic Bombing, the FBI, the Media, and Richard Jewell, the Man Caught in the Middle by Kent Alexander and Kevin Salwen
- Produced by: Tim Moore; Jessica Meier; Kevin Misher; Leonardo DiCaprio; Jennifer Davisson; Jonah Hill; Clint Eastwood
- Starring: Sam Rockwell; Kathy Bates; Jon Hamm; Olivia Wilde; Paul Walter Hauser
- Cinematography: Yves Bélanger
- Edited by: Joel Cox
- Music by: Arturo Sandoval
- Production companies: Malpaso Productions; Appian Way Productions; Misher Films; 75 Year Plan Productions
- Distributed by: Warner Bros. Pictures
- Release dates: November 20, 2019 (AFI Fest); December 13, 2019 (United States)
- Running time: 131 minutes
- Country: United States
- Language: English
- Budget: $45 million
- Box office: $44.6 million

Richard Jewell is a 2019 American biographical drama film directed and produced by Clint Eastwood and written by Billy Ray. It is based on the 1997 Vanity Fair article "American Nightmare: The Ballad of Richard Jewell" by Marie Brenner and the 2019 book The Suspect: An Olympic Bombing, the FBI, the Media, and Richard Jewell, the Man Caught in the Middle by Kent Alexander and Kevin Salwen. The film depicts the July 27, 1996, Centennial Olympic Park bombing and its aftermath, as security guard Richard Jewell finds a bomb during the 1996 Summer Olympics in Atlanta, Georgia, and alerts authorities to evacuate, only to later be wrongly accused of having placed the device himself. The film stars Paul Walter Hauser as Jewell alongside Sam Rockwell, Kathy Bates, Jon Hamm, and Olivia Wilde.

After its world premiere on November 20, 2019, at AFI Fest, the film was theatrically released in the United States on December 13 by Warner Bros. Pictures. It grossed $44 million against a $45 million budget and received generally positive reviews from critics, with praise for the performances (particularly those of Bates, Rockwell, and Hauser) and Eastwood's direction. However, several journalists criticized the film's portrayal of the reporter who first accused Jewell, Kathy Scruggs, specifically its depiction of her trading sex for stories. Richard Jewell was chosen by the National Board of Review as one of the ten best films of the year, and for her performance in the film Bates won the National Board of Review Award for Best Supporting Actress and was nominated for Best Supporting Actress at both the Academy Awards and the Golden Globes.

== Plot ==
In 1986 in Atlanta, Georgia, Richard Jewell is working as an office supply clerk at the Small Business Administration, where he builds a rapport with attorney Watson Bryant before leaving to pursue a law enforcement career. He is hired as a sheriff's deputy, but is discharged, and by early 1996 is working as a security guard at Piedmont College. He was fired from this position after multiple complaints of acting beyond his jurisdiction and moved in with his mother, Bobi. That summer, he finds work as a security guard at the Summer Olympics in Atlanta, monitoring Centennial Park.

Early in the morning on July 27, 1996, Jewell notices a stray backpack beneath a bench after chasing off some drunken teens during a Jack Mack and the Heart Attack concert. Much to the annoyance of his coworkers, he insists that proper protocol be followed, but an explosives expert discovers the backpack contains a bomb. The security team is still working to move concert attendees away from the bomb when it detonates, and, though there are many injuries and two fatalities, Jewell is heralded as a hero, as his vigilance is believed to have saved many lives.

The dean of Piedmont College contacts the FBI to raise suspicions about Jewell, and, after looking into him, FBI agent Tom Shaw and his team determine that Jewell, as a white, male, "wanna-be" police officer, fits the profile of someone who might seek glory and attention by creating a dangerous situation so they can come to the rescue. Shaw is approached by journalist Kathy Scruggs of The Atlanta Journal, and, in exchange for the promise of sexual favors, he reveals Jewell is a suspect in the bombing. The Journal publishes Scruggs' story on the front page, and the media narrative about Jewell immediately shifts from laudatory to critical.

Before Jewell learns he is a suspect, Shaw lures him to the FBI office. Though initially cooperative, he becomes suspicious when asked to sign an acknowledgement that he has been read his Miranda rights and phones Bryant, whom he had just contacted to handle a proposed book deal. Bryant, now running his struggling law firm, agrees to represent Jewell.

After a disastrous interview on The Today Show, and still not wholly convinced of Jewell's innocence, Bryant and his secretary, Nadya, time how long it takes to travel the distance between the phone booth used to make a bomb threat shortly before the explosion and Centennial Park. Concluding that it was impossible for Jewell to make the threat and discover the bomb when he did, Bryant becomes determined to keep Jewell from getting "railroaded".

The FBI searches Jewell's home and seizes property, including his mother's Tupperware, his true crime books, and a cache of firearms. Jewell admits to Bryant that he has not paid income tax for years and was once arrested for exceeding his authority. Bryant scolds Jewell for being too collegial with the investigators, and Jewell says his ingrained respect for authority makes it difficult for him not to be deferential.

Bryant arranges a polygraph examination, which Jewell passes. Scruggs, though initially brash and confident in her reporting, is troubled to learn the FBI has begun to look for someone who may have called in the bomb threat for Jewell, since having an accomplice would not fit the "lone bomber" profile. Bobi holds a press conference at which she pleads for the FBI to announce Jewell is no longer a suspect so they may proceed with their lives. Finally, Jewell and Bryant meet with Shaw, and after several irrelevant questions, Jewell asks if he will be charged. Met with silence, he leaves. Eighty-eight days after being named a "person of interest," Jewell is handed a formal FBI letter that he is no longer under investigation.

In April 2003, Jewell, now a police officer in Luthersville, Georgia, is visited by Bryant, who tells him that Eric Rudolph has been captured and confessed to the Centennial Olympic Park bombing.

Epilogue: In 2007, Jewell died at age 44 of heart failure. Bryant and Nadya were married, and Bobi babysits their two sons every Saturday night.

== Cast ==
- Sam Rockwell as G. Watson Bryant Jr., an attorney
- Kathy Bates as Barbara "Bobi" Jewell, Richard's mother
- Jon Hamm as FBI Agent Tom Shaw
- Olivia Wilde as Kathleen "Kathy" Scruggs, a journalist at The Atlanta Journal
- Nina Arianda as Nadya Light, Bryant's secretary
- Paul Walter Hauser as Richard "Radar" Jewell, a security guard
- Ian Gomez as FBI Agent Dan Bennet, Shaw's partner
- Wayne Duvall as Richard Rackleff, a polygraph examiner
- Charles Green as Dr. W. Ray Cleere, dean of Piedmont College
- Mike Pniewski as Brandon Walker, of The Atlanta Journal
- Grant Roberts as Will Jones-APD, a Atlanta Police Department officer
- Alan Heckner as Bill Miller-GBI, a Georgia Bureau of Investigation agent
- Desmond Phillips as Mike Silver-APD
- Alex Collins as Max Green-APD
- Eric Mendenhall as Eric Rudolph, the bomber
- David Shae as Ron Martz, a journalist at The Atlanta Journal who works with Scruggs
- Brian Brightman as Zoeller, an Atlanta Police Bomb Squad officer
- Déjà Dee as Woman in Park, who is killed by the explosion
- Billy Slaughter as Tim Barker, from AT&T media relations
- Dylan Kussman as Bruce Hughes, an FBI Special Agent and Shaw's supervisor
- Robert Treveiler as Patrick Williams, an FBI profiler
- David de Vries as John Walter, managing editor of The Atlanta Journal
- Niko Nicotera as Dave Dutchess, Richard's best friend
- Garon Grigsby as Bryant Gumbel, co-host of The Today Show

== Production ==
The film was initially announced in February 2014, when Leonardo DiCaprio and Jonah Hill teamed to produce the film, with Hill set to play Jewell, and DiCaprio set to play the lawyer who helped Jewell navigate the media blitz that surrounded him. Paul Greengrass began negotiations to direct the film, with Billy Ray writing the screenplay. Other directors considered include Ezra Edelman (known for the 2016 documentary O.J.: Made in America) and David O. Russell, before Clint Eastwood was officially attached in early 2019. DiCaprio and Hill did not end up acting in the film, though they remained as producers.

In May 2019, Warner Bros. acquired the project from 20th Century Fox, which had been acquired by The Walt Disney Company earlier that year. In June, Sam Rockwell was cast as the lawyer, and Paul Walter Hauser as Jewell. Kathy Bates, Olivia Wilde, Jon Hamm, and Ian Gomez were also cast. Nina Arianda joined the cast in July. Filming began on June 24, 2019, in Atlanta.

In an interview with Ellen DeGeneres on her talk show, Eastwood explained how he continued to work on the film despite a wildfire near the studio. DeGeneres described the November 10 blaze, known as the Barham Brush Fire, as a "really bad fire that came really close to the lot," adding that "air quality was so bad that everyone evacuated." Eastwood replied: "I was coming back down to do some work at a sound stage and I saw all this smoke going. And I'm getting closer and closer and its Warner Bros. and its smoke and I got almost up there and I thought, the whole studio's burning down, maybe I'll go in and see if I can retrieve something. So we went on the sound stage and started working and we forgot about it and...everybody said, 'The studio's been evacuated!' And I said, 'We're not evacuated, we're here working!'"

== Release ==
A trailer for the film was released on October 3, 2019, and the film premiered at AFI Fest on November 20, before being theatrically released in the United States on December 13 by Warner Bros. Pictures.

== Reception ==
=== Box office ===
Richard Jewell grossed $22.3 million in the United States and Canada, and $22.3 million in other territories, for a worldwide box office total of $44.6 million, against a production budget of $45 million. Its performance was characterized as a box office flop by several media outlets.

In the United States and Canada, the film was released alongside Jumanji: The Next Level and Black Christmas, and was initially projected to gross around $10 million from 2,502 theaters over its opening weekend. However, after making $1.6 million on its first day, weekend estimates were lowered to $5 million, and it ended up earning $4.7 million, one of the 50 worst wide openings ever. It was Eastwood's worst opening weekend since Bronco Billy in 1980, and the second-lowest opening of his career. The film finished fourth at the box office, behind Jumanji: The Next Level, Frozen II, and Knives Out.

Its second weekend, the film fell 45% to $2.6 million, finishing in seventh place at the box office, and its third weekend, it made $3 million (and a total of $5.4 million over the five-day Christmas weekend), finishing tenth.

=== Critical response ===
On the review aggregator website Rotten Tomatoes, 77% of 301 critics' reviews of the film are positive, with an average rating of 6.8/10; the site's "critics consensus" reads: "Richard Jewell simplifies the real-life events that inspired it—yet still proves that Clint Eastwood remains a skilled filmmaker of admirable economy." On Metacritic the film has a weighted average score of 68 out of 100 based on reviews from 45 critics, indicating "generally favorable" reviews. Audiences polled by CinemaScore gave the film an average grade of "A" on an A+ to F scale.

=== Portrayal of Kathy Scruggs ===
The film came under fire for its portrayal of The Atlanta Journal-Constitution reporter Kathy Scruggs, who had died of a prescription drug overdose in 2001. Criticism was directed at the film for depicting her as offering to engage in sex with an FBI agent in return for confidential information.

The editor-in-chief of the AJC wrote in an open letter stating that this depicted incident was "entirely false and malicious". Employees of the newspaper demanded the film have a prominent disclaimer that "some events were imagined for dramatic purposes and artistic license." Critical commentators argued that the film perpetuates a sexist trope of women journalists exchanging sex for information. The film shows Scruggs meeting her FBI source at a bar, where she learns that Jewell is the prime suspect. This is true, according to Kent Alexander, co-author of the 2019 book The Suspect: An Olympic Bombing, the FBI, the Media, and Richard Jewell, the Man Caught in the Middle, which the film is partially based on. However, Alexander said that he and his co-writer, Kevin Salwen, did not find any evidence that Scruggs "traded sex for the story".

Warner Bros. Pictures, Clint Eastwood, Paul Walter Hauser and Olivia Wilde defended the film's portrayal of Scruggs. Warner Bros. noted that the film has a disclaimer at the end, reading: "The film is based on actual historical events. Dialogue and certain events and characters contained in the film were created for the purposes of dramatization." Eastwood suspected that, because the AJC was the first paper to print that Jewell committed a crime, they were "probably looking for ways to rationalize their activity."

Wilde, who plays Scruggs in the film, defended her role by saying: "She [Scruggs] had a very close relationship with the cops and the FBI helping to tell their story, and yes, by all accounts she had relationships with different people in that field." Wilde also stated there was a sexist double standard, in that Jon Hamm's portrayal of the FBI agent was not held to the same scrutiny.

=== Accolades ===
| Award | Date of ceremony | Category | Recipients | Result | Ref. |
|---|---|---|---|---|---|
| Academy Awards | February 9, 2020 | Best Supporting Actress | Kathy Bates | Nominated | |
| AARP Movies for Grownups Awards | January 19, 2020 | Readers' Choice | Richard Jewell | Nominated | |
| American Film Institute | January 3, 2020 | Top Ten Films of the Year | Richard Jewell | Won | |
| Club Média Ciné | 2021 | Best Foreign Film | Richard Jewell | Nominated | |
| Detroit Film Critics Society | December 9, 2019 | Best Supporting Actor | Sam Rockwell | Nominated | |
| Detroit Film Critics Society | December 9, 2019 | Best Supporting Actress | Kathy Bates | Nominated | |
| Detroit Film Critics Society | December 9, 2019 | Best Breakthrough Performance | Paul Walter Hauser | Nominated | |
| Georgia Film Critics Association | January 10, 2019 | Best Supporting Actress | Kathy Bates | Nominated | |
| Georgia Film Critics Association | January 10, 2019 | Oglethorpe Award for Excellence in Georgia Cinema | Clint Eastwood and Billy Ray | Nominated | |
| Golden Globe Awards | January 5, 2020 | Best Supporting Actress | Kathy Bates | Nominated | |
| Hawaii Film Critics Society | January 13, 2020 | Best Supporting Actress | Kathy Bates | Nominated | |
| Hollywood Critics Association | January 9, 2020 | Breakthrough Performance – Actor | Paul Walter Hauser | Nominated | |
| Hollywood Critics Association | January 9, 2020 | Game Changer Award | Paul Walter Hauser | Won | |
| Houston Film Critics Society Awards | January 2, 2020 | Best Supporting Actress | Kathy Bates | Nominated | |
| National Board of Review Awards | December 3, 2019 | Top 10 Films | Richard Jewell | Won | |
| National Board of Review Awards | December 3, 2019 | Best Supporting Actress | Kathy Bates | Won | |
| National Board of Review Awards | December 3, 2019 | Best Breakthrough Performance | Paul Walter Hauser | Won | |
| North Texas Film Critics Association | December 16, 2019 | Best Supporting Actress | Kathy Bates | Nominated | |
