= Paul Walter Hauser =

American actor (born 1986)

- Hauser in 2026
- Born: October 15, 1986 (age 40); Grand Rapids, Michigan, U.S.
- Other name: Paul Hauser
- Occupations: Actor; professional wrestler
- Years active: 2005–present (actor); 2023–present (pro wrestler)
- Spouse: Amy Elizabeth Boland (m. 2020)
- Children: 3
- Professional wrestling career
- Ring name: Paul Walter Hauser
- Billed height: 5 ft 9 in (175 cm)
- Billed weight: 251 lb (114 kg)
- Billed from: Grand Rapids, Michigan
- Trained by: Paul London
- Debut: November 16, 2023

Paul Walter Hauser (born October 15, 1986) is an American actor and professional wrestler. His breakout performance was as the title character in Clint Eastwood's drama film Richard Jewell in 2019. He starred as murderer Larry Hall in the 2022 true crime miniseries Black Bird, for which he won a Golden Globe Award and a Primetime Emmy Award, and is also known for his portrayal of Stingray in the Netflix series Cobra Kai. He has also provided the voice of Embarrassment in Pixar's Inside Out 2 in 2024. The following year, he portrayed Bruce Springsteen's recording engineer in Springsteen: Deliver Me from Nowhere and supervillain Harvey Elder / Mole Man in The Fantastic Four: First Steps.

As an occasional professional wrestler, Hauser is signed to Major League Wrestling (MLW) and also makes appearances on the independent circuit.

== Early life and education ==
Hauser was raised in Saginaw, Michigan. His parents are Deborah and Rev. Paul Hauser, a Lutheran minister.

He attended Valley Lutheran High School, a private parochial school in Saginaw. He attended Concordia University Chicago before dropping out to pursue a career in the entertainment industry.

== Career ==
Hauser portrayed Shawn Eckhardt in the 2017 film I, Tonya, Dale in the 2010 film Virginia, and Keith in the television series Kingdom. Hauser was initially cast as an extra for Virginia as his acting debut, and complimented director Dustin Lance Black for his speech after winning the Academy Award for Best Original Screenplay in 2009 for Milk (2008); this led to Black writing him a larger role in the movie.

He had the recurring role of Deshawn in the Amazon web series Betas, and in 2018 appeared as Lonnie Laloush in Super Troopers 2 and as Ivanhoe in BlacKkKlansman. He has also appeared as a guest star on the television series Unbreakable Kimmy Schmidt, The Night Shift, Superstore, Key & Peele, It's Always Sunny in Philadelphia, Community, Blunt Talk, I Think You Should Leave, Bupkis, and Cobra Kai. In 2019, he starred in Clint Eastwood's Richard Jewell, portraying the title role, Richard Jewell, the real life security guard who spotted the bomb at the Centennial Olympic Park bombing. In 2020, he starred in Songbird, a film based on the COVID-19 pandemic.

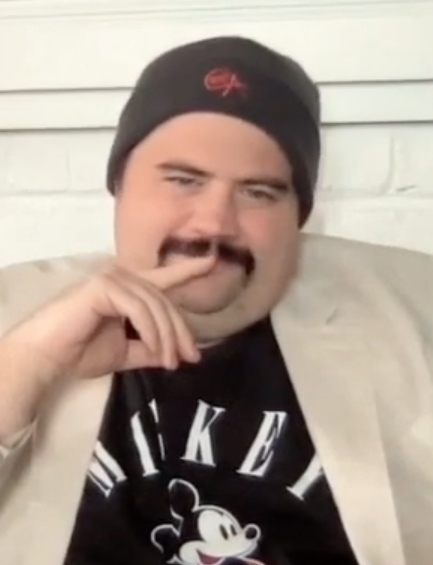
Hauser in a 2021 interview about Cruella

In 2021, Hauser played Horace Badun in the crime comedy-drama Cruella, a Disney live-action prequel/spin-off of One Hundred and One Dalmatians. Hauser also starred as Raymond Porter, better known by his nickname Stingray, in Cobra Kai. He appeared as a recurring character in Season 2, and a major anti-hero in Seasons 4 & 5. Although known for his comedic turns, Hauser gained broad recognition and critical praise for his portrayal of the serial killer Larry Hall in the 2022 Apple TV+ true crime miniseries Black Bird, adapted from James Keene's memoir In with the Devil. Critic Nick Schager wrote of Hauser's performance, "even in a sea of maniacal villains, his Larry Hall stands out as a uniquely cunning madman, so unpredictable and unnerving as to be downright unforgettable."

In 2022, Hauser debuted as a rapper under the moniker Signet Ringer. He released his first EP, Murder for Higher, on July 8, 2022.

In 2024, he voiced a lead role in the DreamWorks Animation film Orion and the Dark and the role of Embarrassment in the Pixar film Inside Out 2. In 2024, Hauser became attached to the true-crime drama Fruitcake alongside Jennifer Garner; the lead role in a bio-pic about actor-comedian Chris Farley; a reboot of The Naked Gun franchise; the Marvel Cinematic Universe film The Fantastic Four: First Steps (2025); a biographical film about Bruce Springsteen titled Springsteen: Deliver Me from Nowhere in the role of recording engineer and guitar tech Mike Batlan; and the comedy Balls Up alongside Mark Wahlberg. That same year, he starred in The Luckiest Man in America, in which he plays Michael Larson, a contestant accused of cheating on the game show Press Your Luck in 1984.

== Professional wrestling ==
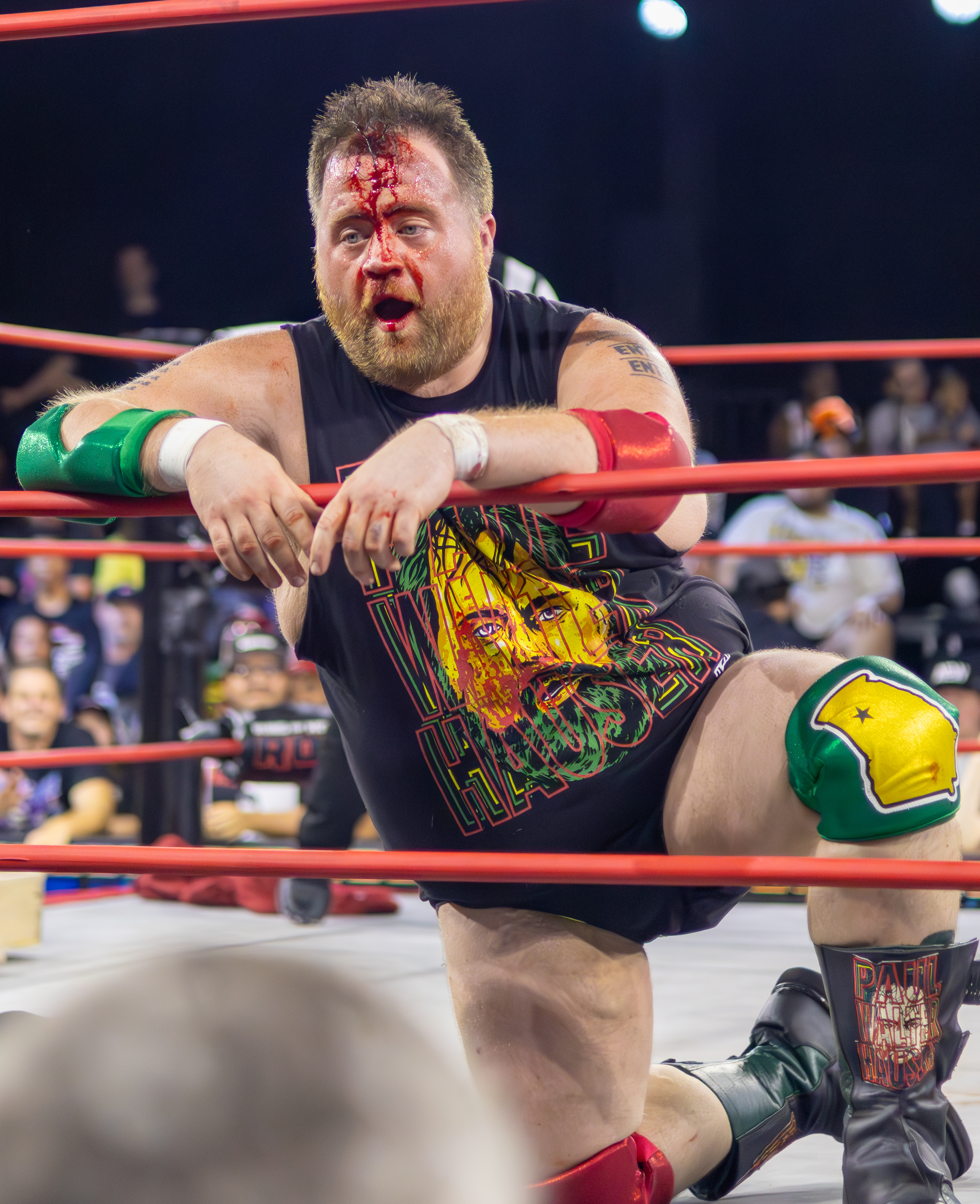
Hauser in 2025

Hauser made his professional wrestling debut at The Wrestling Revolver's Unreal show in Los Angeles in November 2023 defeating Matthew Palmer. His next appearance with the promotion was in a Slammy Vs. Emmy Winner Take All match where he defeated Matt Cardona in March 2024. Hauser has made sporadic appearances for All Elite Wrestling (AEW) as well on the independent circuit. He signed with Major League Wrestling (MLW) in May 2024. He faced Danhausen to a no contest at Pro Wrestling REVOLVER in June 2024. In February 2025, he made his debut with Defy Wrestling in Seattle Street Fight defeating Joey Janela with Aubrey Edwards as the special guest referee.

Hauser won his first title in wrestling by capturing the PROGRESS Wrestling Proteus Title at Progress Chapter 179: Progress Las Vegas on April 17, 2025, where he defeated the champion Simon Miller, Adam Priest, Charles Crowley, and Effy in a five way match. In July 2025, Hauser wore his PROGRESS Proteus Title belt to the World premiere of The Fantastic Four: First Steps in Los Angeles. Hauser made seven title defences in total, holding it for 556 days before losing the championship to Dijak at Progress Chapter 199: Bonestorm on 25 October 2026.

Hauser was a special guest commentator for AEW on their August 9, 2025, episode of Collision. On August 29, 2025, at Ring of Honor (ROH) Death Before Dishonor, he wrestled QT Marshall in a Fight Without Honor.

== Personal life ==
Hauser married Amy Elizabeth Boland on July 23, 2020. They have three children. Hauser is a Christian. He and his wife Amy were featured in a video series for online Christian multimedia movement I Am Second.

== Filmography ==
=== Film ===
Year	Title	Role	Notes
2010	Virginia	Dale	
2011	Demoted	Bothered Salesman	Uncredited
2013	iSteve	Pastey Jones	
2017	I, Tonya	Shawn Eckhardt	
2018	Super Troopers 2	Lonnie Laloush	
2018	BlacKkKlansman	Ivanhoe	
2019	Late Night	Eugene Mancuso	
2019	Beats	Terrence	
2019	Richard Jewell	Richard Jewell	
2020	Adam	Trent	
2020	Da 5 Bloods	Simon	
2020	Eat Wheaties!	James Fisk	
2020	Songbird	Michael Dozer	
2021	Silk Road	Curtis Clark Green	
2021	Cruella	Horace Badun	
2021	Queenpins	Ken Miller	
2022	Delia's Gone	Bo	
2022	Aqua Teen Forever: Plantasm	Elmer (voice)	
2023	Americana	Lefty Ledbetter	
2023	Old Dads	Tracy	
2024	Orion and the Dark	The Dark (voice)	
2024	Inside Out 2	Embarrassment (voice)	
2024	The Instigators	Booch	
2024	The Luckiest Man in America	Michael Larson	Also executive producer
2025	The Fantastic Four: First Steps	Harvey Elder / Mole Man	
2025	The Naked Gun	Capt. Ed Hocken Jr.	
2025	Playdate	Zack Galifinack-ish	Uncredited
2025	Springsteen: Deliver Me from Nowhere	Mike Batlan	
2026	Balls Up	Elijah	
2026	Jackass: Best and Last	Himself	Guest appearance
2026	Resident Evil	Paul	
TBA	Deep Eddy †	Pug Browder	Post-production

=== Television ===
Year	Title	Role	Notes
2005	Too Late with Adam Carolla	Various roles (voice)	2 episodes
2010	Community	Student #3	Episode: "Messianic Myths and Ancient Peoples"
2010	It's Always Sunny in Philadelphia	Richie	Episode: "Dee Reynolds: Shaping America's Youth"
2013	Key & Peele	Various roles	2 episodes
2013–2014	Betas	Dashawn	4 episodes
2014–2017	Kingdom	Keith	Recurring role, 27 episodes
2015	The Night Shift	Oren Edwards	Episode: "Ghosts"
2015	Blunt Talk	Audience Member	Episode: "Who Kisses So Early in the Morning?"
2017	Superstore	Vince	Episode: "Rebranding"
2017	A Midsummer's Nightmare	Nick Bottoms	Television film
2018–2019	Unbreakable Kimmy Schmidt	Tripp Knob	2 episodes
2019–2025	Cobra Kai	Raymond "Stingray" Porter	Recurring role, 15 episodes (seasons 2, 4–6)
2019	WWE Smackdown	Himself	1 episode
2020	Reno 911!	Jeffy Renee Chisholm	Recurring role, 6 episodes
2021	Calls	Floyd (voice)	Episode: "Me, Myself, and Darlene"
2021	I Think You Should Leave with Tim Robinson	Scott	Episode: "Everyone just needs to be more in the moment."
2022	The Late Show With Stephen Colbert	No One (voice)	1 episode
2022	Black Bird	Larry Hall	Miniseries, 6 episodes
2023	AEW Dynamite	Himself	1 episode
2023	AEW Rampage	Himself	1 episode
2023	The Afterparty	Travis Gladrise	Main role, 10 episodes (Season 2)
2023	Bupkis	Hauser	Episode: "Show Me the Way"
2025	AEW Collision	Himself	1 episode
2025–present	The Chosen Adventures	Sheep	Voice only, 14 episodes
2026	King of the Hill	Cosplayer (voice)	Episode: "Hank Encounters of the Nerd Kind"
2027	Scooby-Doo: Origins	Owner of Scooby-Doo	Filming

== Acting accolades ==
Year (Note: Indicates the year of ceremony.)	Organizations (Note: Awards, festivals, honors and other miscellaneous organizations are listed in alphabetical order.)	Category	Work	Result	Ref.
2020	Astra Film Awards	Game Changer Award	Richard Jewell	Won	
2020	Astra Film Awards	Breakthrough Performance Actor	Richard Jewell	Nominated	
2021	Astra Midseason Film Awards	Best Supporting Actor	Cruella	Nominated	
2024	Astra TV Awards	Best Supporting Actor in a Limited Series or Streaming Movie	Black Bird	Won	
2025	Children's and Family Emmy Awards	Outstanding Voice Performer in a Children's or Young Teen Program	Orion and the Dark	Nominated	
2023	Critics' Choice Television Awards	Best Supporting Actor in a Movie/Miniseries	Black Bird	Won	
2019	Detroit Film Critics Society	Breakthrough Performance	Richard Jewell / Late Night / Beats / 7 Days to Vegas	Nominated	
2021	Garden State Film Festival	Best Ensemble (Feature)	7 Days to Vegas	Won	
2023	Golden Globe Awards	Best Supporting Actor – Limited or Anthology Series or Television Motion Picture	Black Bird	Won	
2019	Indiana Film Journalists Association	Best Actor	Richard Jewell	Nominated	
2019	National Board of Review	Breakthrough Performance	Richard Jewell	Won	
2024	Primetime Emmy Awards	Outstanding Supporting Actor in a Limited or Anthology Series or Movie	Black Bird	Won	
2021	Screen Actors Guild Awards	Outstanding Performance by a Cast in a Motion Picture	Da 5 Bloods	Nominated	
2023	Screen Actors Guild Awards	Outstanding Performance by a Male Actor in a Television Movie or Limited Series	Black Bird	Nominated	
2019	Women Film Critics Circle	Best Actor	Richard Jewell	Nominated	

== Championships and accomplishments ==
- Progress Wrestling
  - Progress Proteus Championship (1 time)
- Pro Wrestling Illustrated
  - Ranked no. 374 out of the top 500 singles wrestlers in the PWI 500 in 2026
