= Atlanta shooting =

Atlanta shooting may refer to:

- 1999 Atlanta day trading firm shootings, a shooting spree at Atlanta-area trading day firms and houses that killed 12 people and injured 13 others in 1999
- Brian Nichols, who shot and killed three people while escaping a Fulton County courthouse before killing an ICE agent later
- Killing of Rayshard Brooks, the fatal shooting of an African-American man by Atlanta police in 2020
- 2021 Atlanta spa shootings, a shooting spree at three spas that killed eight people, including six women of Asian descent, and injured a ninth in 2021
- 2023 Atlanta shooting, a mass shooting at a medical facility that killed a person and injured four others in 2023

== See also ==
- Crime in Atlanta
