= National Board of Review Awards 2019 =

American film award

91st NBR Awards
Best Film: The Irishman

The 91st National Board of Review Awards, honoring the best in film for 2019, were announced on December 3, 2019.

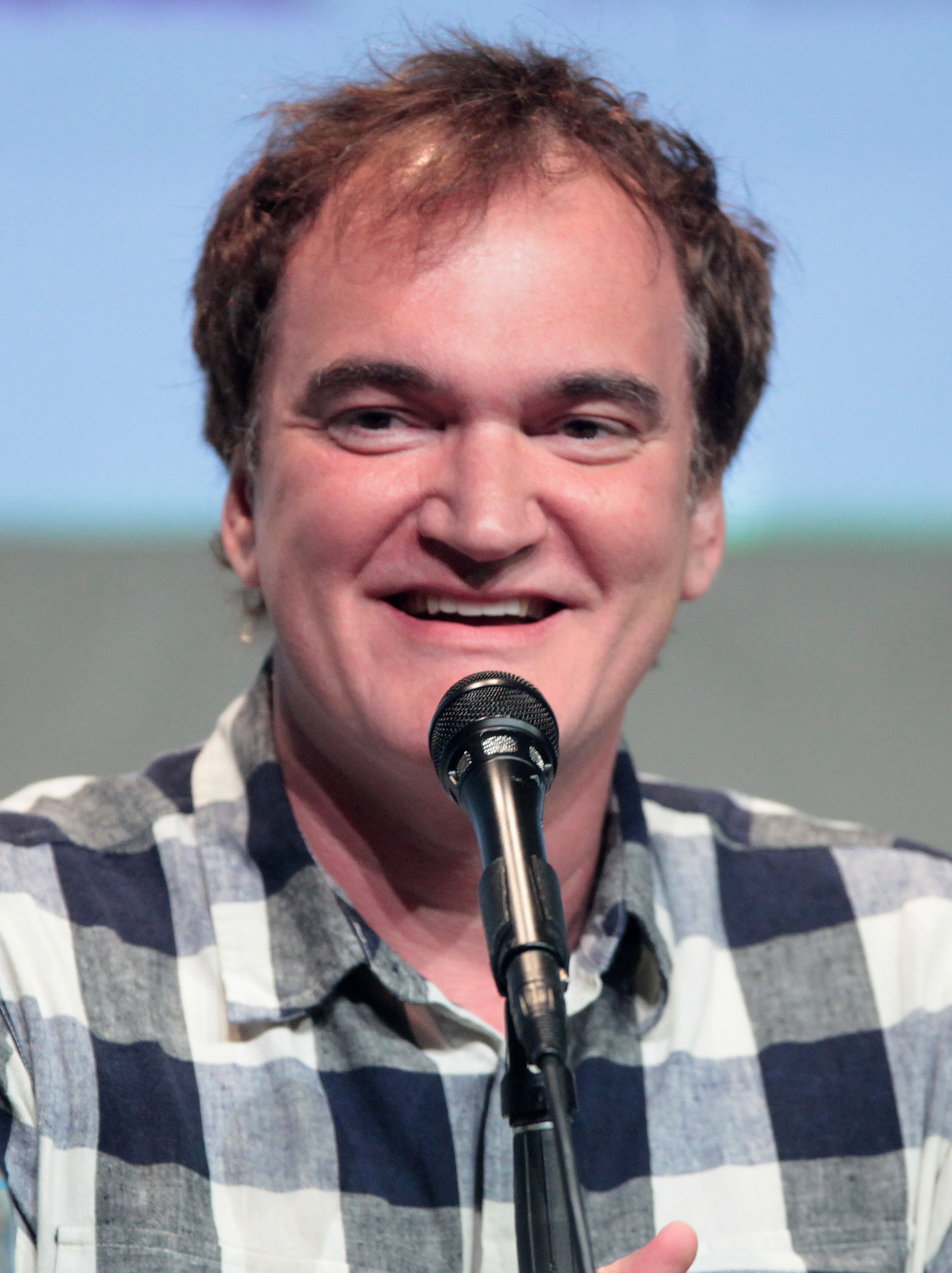
Quentin Tarantino, Best Director winner

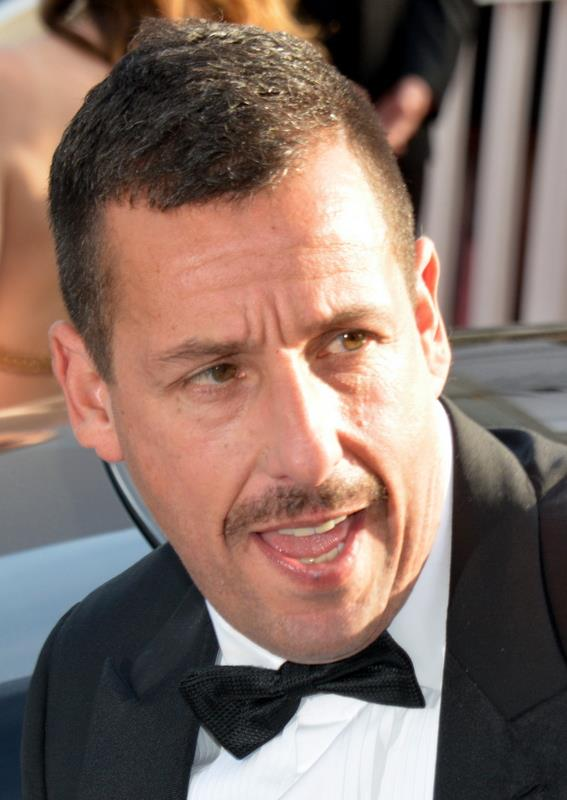
Adam Sandler, Best Actor winner

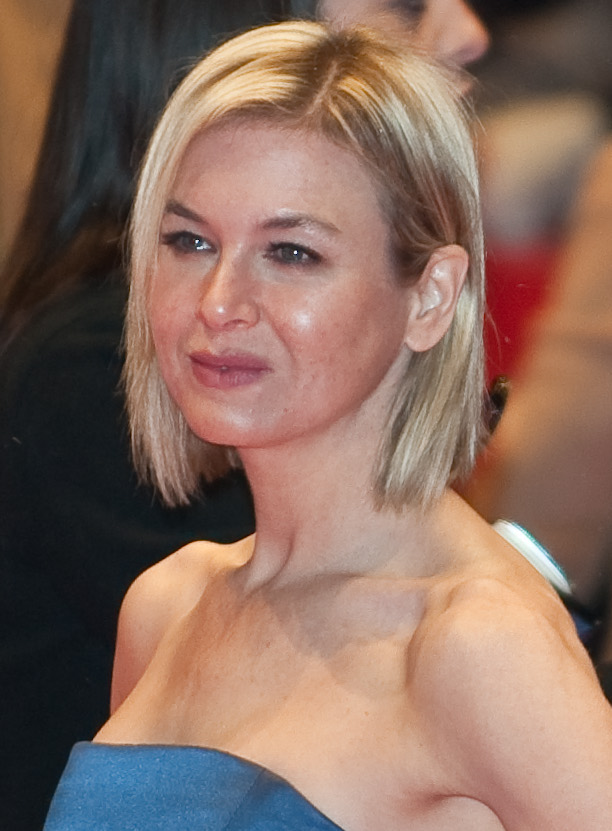
Renée Zellweger, Best Actress winner

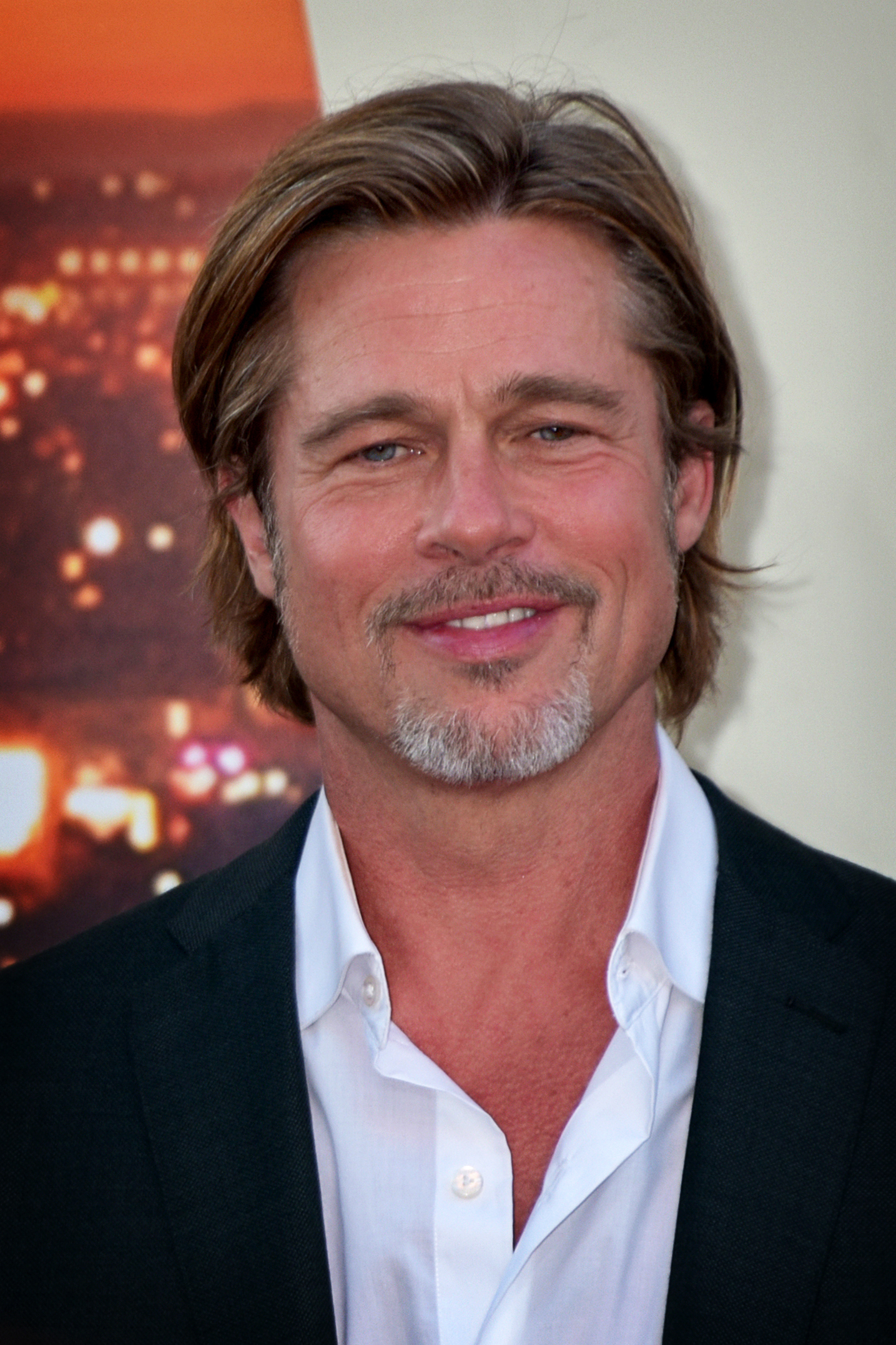
Brad Pitt, Best Supporting Actor winner

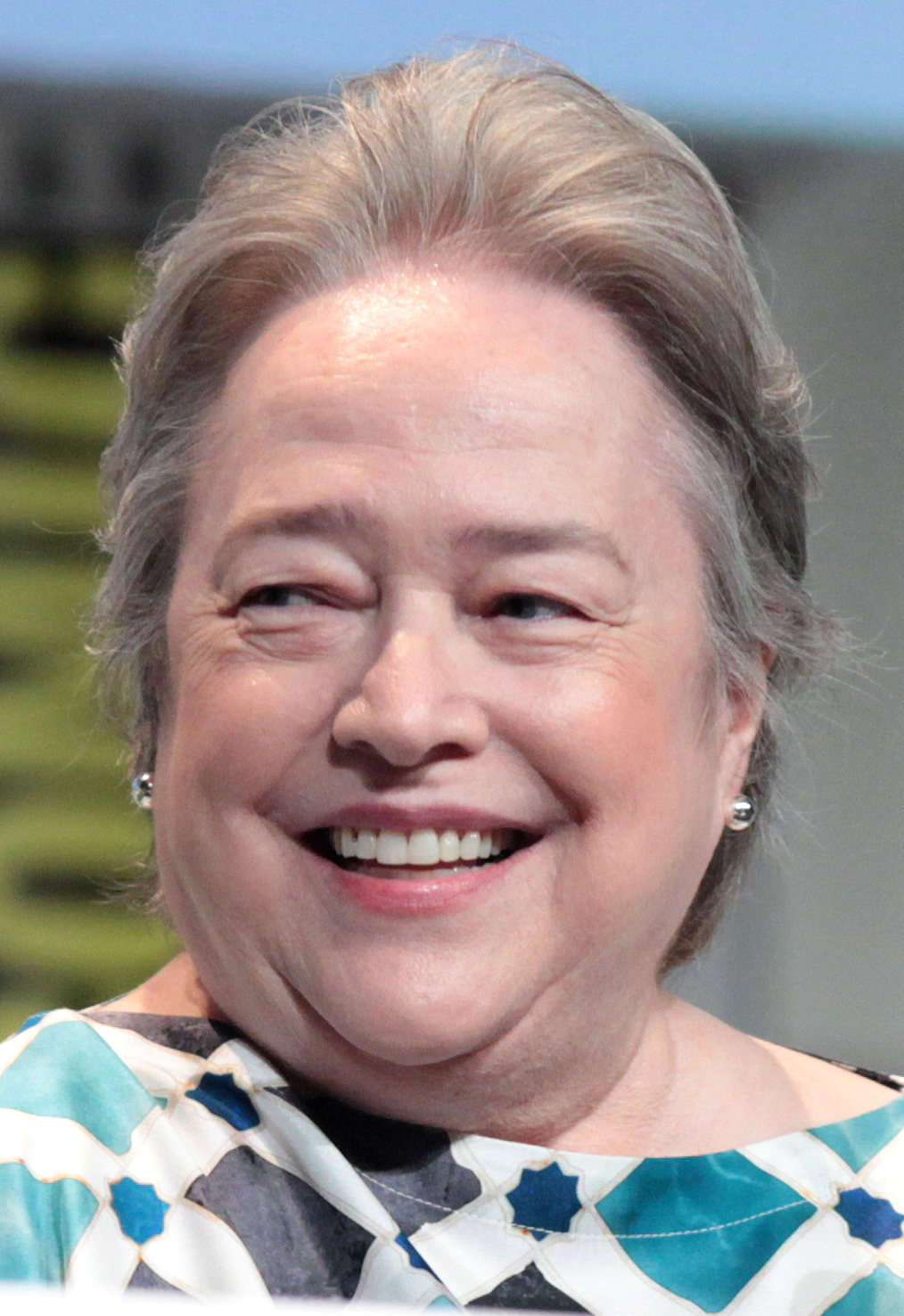
Kathy Bates, Best Supporting Actor winner

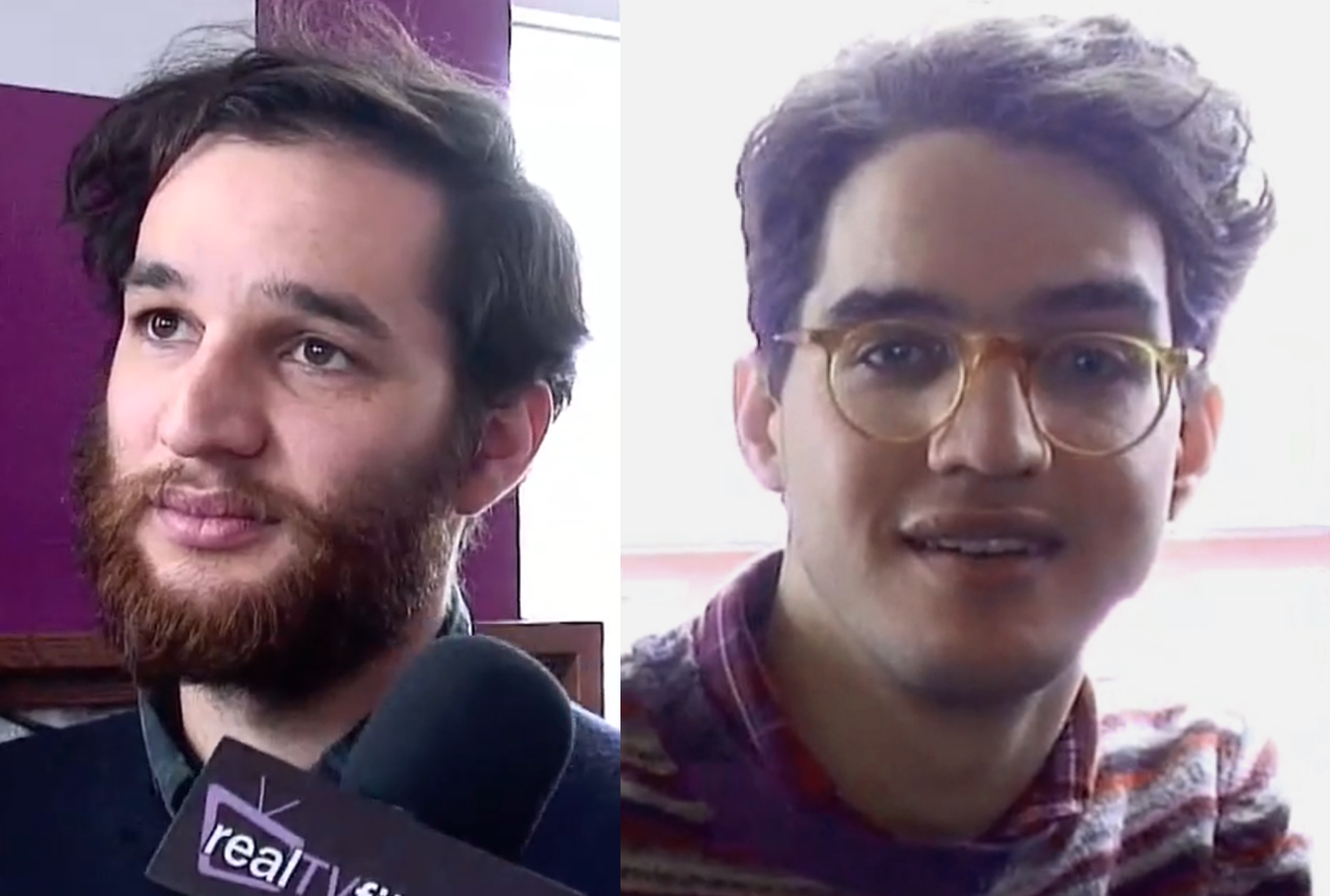
Josh Safdie and Benny Safdie, Best Original Screenplay co-winners

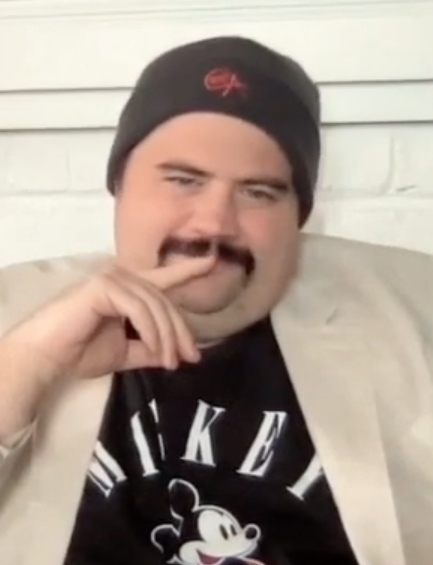
Paul Walter Hauser, Breakthrough Performance winner

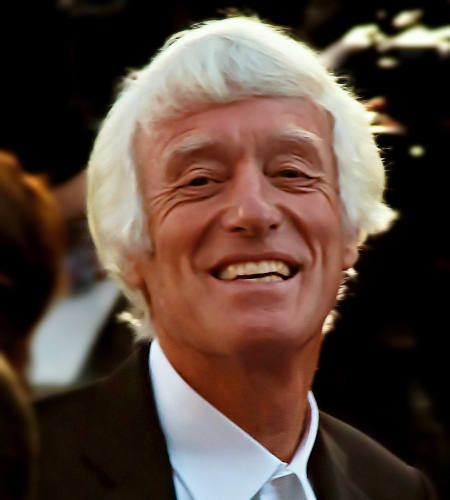
Roger Deakins, Outstanding Achievement in Cinematography winner

== Top 10 Films ==
Films listed alphabetically except top, which is ranked as Best Film of the Year:

The Irishman

- 1917
- Dolemite Is My Name
- Ford v Ferrari
- Jojo Rabbit
- Knives Out
- Marriage Story
- Once Upon a Time in Hollywood
- Richard Jewell
- Uncut Gems
- Waves

== Winners ==
Best Film:

- The Irishman

Best Director:

- Quentin Tarantino – Once Upon a Time in Hollywood

Best Actor:

- Adam Sandler – Uncut Gems

Best Actress:

- Renée Zellweger – Judy

Best Supporting Actor:

- Brad Pitt – Once Upon a Time in Hollywood

Best Supporting Actress:

- Kathy Bates – Richard Jewell

Best Original Screenplay:

- Josh Safdie, Benny Safdie, and Ronald Bronstein – Uncut Gems

Best Adapted Screenplay:

- Steven Zaillian – The Irishman

Best Animated Feature:

- How to Train Your Dragon: The Hidden World

Best Foreign Language Film:

- Parasite

Best Documentary:

- Maiden

Best Ensemble:

- Knives Out

Breakthrough Performance:

- Paul Walter Hauser – Richard Jewell

Best Directorial Debut:

- Melina Matsoukas – Queen & Slim

Outstanding Achievement in Cinematography:

- Roger Deakins – 1917

NBR Freedom of Expression:

- For Sama
- Just Mercy

NBR Icon Award:

- Martin Scorsese, Robert De Niro, and Al Pacino

== Top 5 Foreign Films ==
Parasite

- Atlantics
- The Invisible Life of Eurídice Gusmão
- Pain and Glory
- Portrait of a Lady on Fire
- Transit

== Top 5 Documentaries ==
Maiden

- American Factory
- Apollo 11
- The Black Godfather
- Rolling Thunder Revue: A Bob Dylan Story by Martin Scorsese
- Wrestle

== Top 10 Independent Films ==
- The Farewell
- Give Me Liberty
- A Hidden Life
- Judy
- The Last Black Man in San Francisco
- Midsommar
- The Nightingale
- The Peanut Butter Falcon
- The Souvenir
- Wild Rose
