= Dennis McFarland =

American novelist and short story writer (born 1949)

- Born: May 13, 1949 (age 77); Mobile, Alabama, U.S.
- Education: Brooklyn College; Goddard College (MFA)
- Occupations: Novelist; short story writer
- Spouse: Michelle Blake (m. 1983)
- Children: 2
- Website: dennismcfarland.com/index.htm

Dennis McFarland (born May 13, 1949) is an American novelist and short story writer. His novels include Nostalgia, Letter from Point Clear, Prince Edward, Singing Boy, A Face at the Window, School for the Blind and The Music Room. His short fiction has appeared in The American Scholar, The New Yorker, Prize Stories: the O’Henry Awards, Best American Short Stories and other publications. He has received a fellowship from the National Endowment for the Arts as well as the Wallace E. Stegner Fellowship from Stanford University.

== Life ==
McFarland was born in Mobile, Alabama, and grew up on a farm. He attended Brooklyn College, where he studied music and composition, and later earned an M.F.A. in creative writing from Goddard College. While at Goddard, he met writer and poet Michelle Blake; the two married in 1983. They raised two children together and continue to live in rural Vermont and Alabama.

== Career ==
McFarland's debut novel, The Music Room (1990), was a national bestseller, hailed by the New York Times Book Review as "a rare pleasure...A novel of almost organic integrity...Remarkable from its beginning to its surprising, satisfying end." The Hollywood producer Scott Rudin bought the rights, and the playwright Robbie Bates was commissioned to write the screenplay.

Each of the McFarland's subsequent novels have also received critical acclaim. His most recent, Nostalgia (2013), was described in the New York Times Book Review as "searing, poetic and often masterly...a perfect Civil War novel for our time, or any time." It won the prestigious Michael Shaara Award for Excellence in Civil War fiction and is the inspiration for a feature film optioned for development by River Road Entertainment.

His short stories have appeared in The American Scholar, The New Yorker, Prize Stories: the O’Henry Awards, Best American Short Stories, and other publications.

He has taught writing at Stanford University, where he was a Stegner Fellow and a Jones Lecturer in creative writing, as well as Emerson College. In 1991, he received a fellowship from the National Endowment for the Arts.

== Works ==
=== Novels ===
- The Music Room (1990)
- School for the Blind (1994)
- A Face at the Window (1997)
- Singing Boy (2001)
- Prince Edward (2004)
- Letter from Point Clear (2007)
- Nostalgia (2013)

=== Anthologies ===
- Prize Stories: The O'Henry Awards (1990)
- "Nothing to Ask For," Best American Short Stories (1990)
- "A Gentle Plea for Chaos," A Few Thousand Words about Love (1998)
