= Former FBI Ten Most Wanted Fugitives =

This list of lists of former FBI Ten Most Wanted Fugitives are convicted felons that have been on the list of the FBI Ten Most Wanted Fugitives.

== See also ==
- FBI Ten Most Wanted Fugitives
