= Crime in Atlanta =

Atlanta
- Crime rates* (2015)

Violent crimes
- Homicide: 20.2
- Rape: 195.2^{**}
- Robbery: 429.3
- Aggravated assault: 633.5

Property crimes
- Burglary: 1,028.8
- Larceny-theft: 3,549.1
- Motor vehicle theft: 921.4
- Arson: 10.8
- Note: Reported crimes per 100,000 population Source: FBI 2015 UCR data

Crime in Atlanta, Georgia is above the national median and has been a major problem for the city since the middle 20th century.

Atlanta's public safety improvement between 2001 and 2010 occurred at more than twice the rate of the rest of the country. After ranking in the top five highest violent crime cities for most of the previous three decades, in 2009 Atlanta ranked 31st, and in 2015, 24/7 Wall Street ranked it 19th. While various news sources report rankings by crime rate, FBI strongly cautions against comparing different cities' crime rates, as such a misuse of bare statistics ignores various important factors, such as population density, degree of urbanization, composition of population, economic conditions, etc.

== History ==
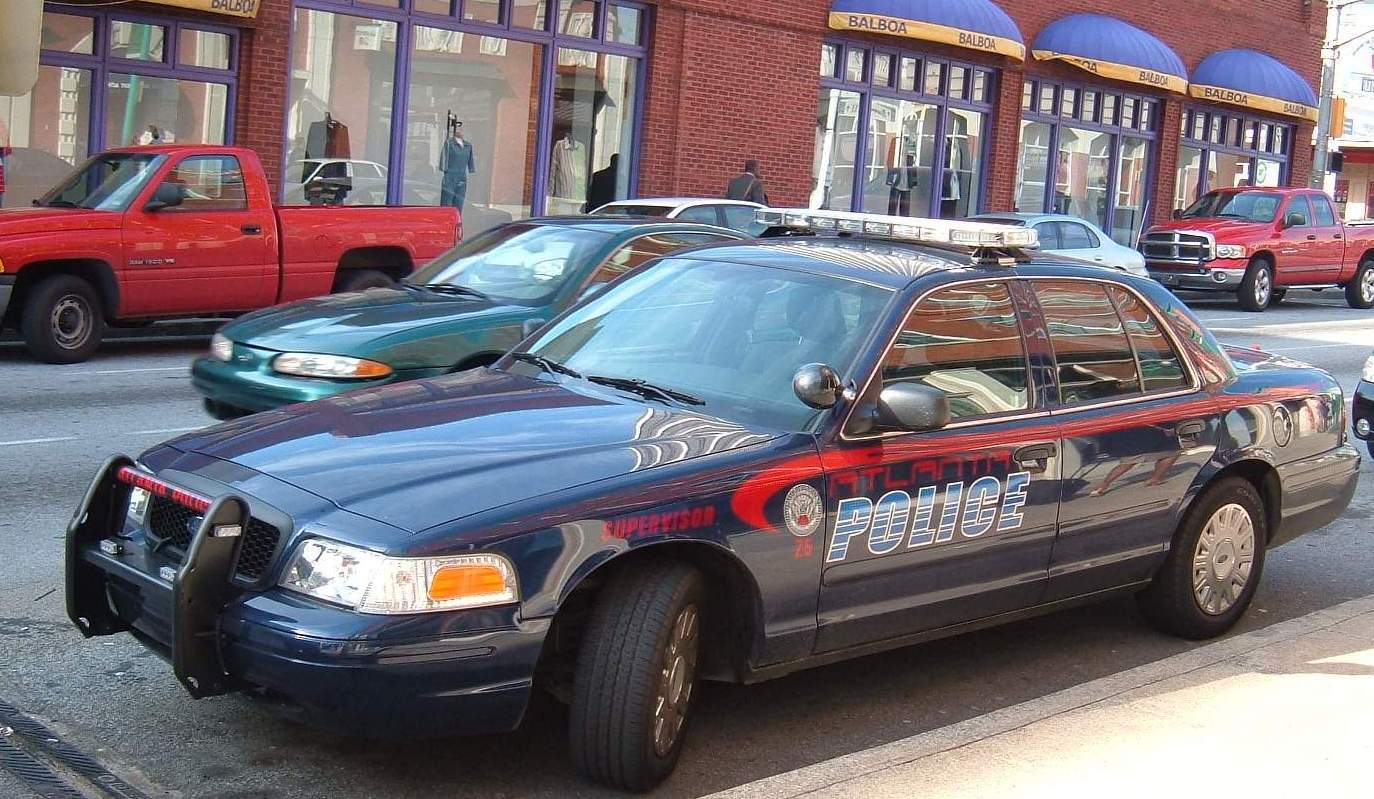
An Atlanta police car

During the 1970s, like with many large cities within the United States, Atlanta's population began to decline. By 1990, the population was 394,017, down almost 20% from its population in 1970, which was 496,973. In addition, the city center and surrounding areas began to go through an urban decay, and crime spiked significantly throughout the 1980s. Along with many other major cities in the United States, Atlanta was hard hit by the crack epidemic of most of the 1980s to early 1990s. In 1994, Atlanta was ranked the most dangerous city in the country by the Morgan Quitno Press.

In 1997, drug-related crime in metro Atlanta increased slightly, in part due to Atlanta becoming an important distribution center for cocaine, and other related drugs imported from Mexico. These increases were mostly seen in Fulton, Gwinnett, DeKalb, Cobb, and Clayton counties. Many law enforcement agencies in the area have joined forces together with the Atlanta Police Department in an effort to decrease the overall crime in metro Atlanta.

In addition, due to large amounts of revitalization projects in the city core, crime continued to fall, even amidst the hard economic times of the late-2000s/early 2010s.

In April 2025, city and state officials celebrated the grand opening of the $118 million Atlanta Public Safety Training Center. For the first time, this center will facilitate local police officers and firefighters training together.

== Policing ==
The city is served by the Atlanta Police Department. In 2013, the APD had 2,000 officers, but the number of officers has decreased since that time. Mayor Kasim Reed has identified an increase in the number of officers to 2,000 as a goal for the city. Although city data shows that APD attrition rates have improved from the 2000s to 2013, morale issues within the police department has persisted due to officer dissatisfaction with salaries. About 45 percent of officers hired between 2005 and 2013 left the force by 2017. Atlanta is divided into six police patrol zones.

According to data collected by a police violence tracking website, there were 168 lethal incidents involving police between 2000 and 2021, roughly 8 people killed per year by police.

The Metropolitan Atlanta Rapid Transit Authority (MARTA), which operates rail, bus, and parking lots in the city and surrounding area, has its own police force. Overall crime rates in are about 30 per every 100,000 system daily riders, which is identical to the crime figure for the Washington, D.C., area's WMATA, higher than crime figure for the Boston area's MBTA, and lower than the crime figure for the San Francisco area's BART. Homicides within the MARTA system have varied. In the fiscal year ending in 2017, for example, there were four homicides investigated by MARTA police, but there were no homicides in the MARTA system in any of the previous last four fiscal years. Total crimes in the MARTA system have declined from fiscal year 2013.

== Crime rates and trends ==
From 2009 to 2016, overall crime in Atlanta declined 27 percent, "with sharp declines in burglaries (9,102 in 2009 to 4,377 in 2016), robberies (2,622 to 1,914) and aggravated assaults (2,602 to 2,179)."

According to data from the City of Atlanta, overall crime has continued to decline from 2016 to 2021 at a rate of about 26 percent. The only exception is the uptick between years 2020 and 2021 (which can be explained by dramatically reduced crime occurrences due to the COVID-19 pandemic and resulting lockdowns). Nevertheless, the overall trend—including the 13.89 percent decline from 2019 to 2021—still suggests a reduction in overall crime and crime rate. Homicides and aggravated assaults, however, did rise between the years 2019 and 2022.

Crime occurrences by category from 2009 to 2022
Year	Aggravated assault	Auto theft	Burglary	Homicide	Larceny from vehicle	Larceny non-vehicle	Robbery	Total
2009	2613	5625	9075	77	10966	8295	2675	39326
2010	2612	4996	7985	89	9176	8510	2161	35529
2011	2536	5205	7404	84	8589	8723	2311	34852
2012	2521	5098	6151	83	8825	8438	2266	33382
2013	2275	4483	5947	81	9343	7905	2364	32398
2014	2238	4142	5466	87	9459	7353	2370	31115
2015	2156	4236	4784	87	9593	7044	2158	30058
2016	2193	3849	4376	114	9995	6564	1915	29006
2017	2036	3195	3394	86	9826	6433	1416	26386
2018	1825	3219	3023	88	10259	6145	1052	25611
2019	2037	2969	2797	104	9525	6400	1018	24850
2020	699	1158	481	157	3322	1268	277	7249
2021	2483	3115	1636	149	8073	5135	806	21397
2022	3192	3221	1791	170	8049	3375	706	22259

=== Homicide ===
Consistent with national trends, the murder rate in Atlanta peaked in 1990 and has declined since. From 2000 to 2010, murders in the city declined by nearly 50 percent. The years 2009 and 2012 had the lowest numbers of homicides in Atlanta than any year dating back to 1963, but there has been an increase in murders in the city beginning in 2013. The number of murders in Atlanta was 80 in 2009, 92 in 2010, 88 in 2011, 85 in 2012, 82 in 2013, 93 in 2014, 95 in 2015, and 111 in 2016. A significant number of murders have remained unsolved; as of February 2017, 51 of the 111 homicides from 2016 remain unsolved.

An analysis of FBI Uniform Crime Report data for 2015, conducted by the economic analysis website 24/7 Wall Street, showed a murder rate in Atlanta of about 20.2 per 100,000 people, making it the 18th highest murder rate among U.S. cities. An October 2016 FiveThirtyEight analysis of preliminary 2016 data, taken from official police information and local reports, found that among U.S. cities with populations of over a quarter-million people, Atlanta had the tenth-highest murder rate, at 23.9 per 100,000 residents.

Fulton County District Attorney Paul Howard said that 17% of 2014 homicides in the county were gang-related. In Atlanta, guns were involved in 82% of homicide cases. In July 2016, in an attempt to combat an increase in homicide, the city began Operation Whiplash, with additional police officers and other resources assigned to 33 "challenging and crime-ridden" neighborhoods in the city.

Homicide investigations have increased in the city for three consecutive years (excluding 2020 due to the COVID-19 pandemic) from 2019 to 2022. In 2022, Atlanta police investigated 170 homicides which is the most since 1996. In 2023, the Atlanta Police Department implemented Operation Heatwave which is a strategic initiative to remove more dangerous drugs, guns, and gangs from the streets of Atlanta. In 2023, homicides dropped to 135, down 22% from 2022.

== Gang crime ==
Street gangs of various levels of sophistication have had a notable presence in the city since the late 1970s. In 2015, Atlanta police were tracking about 192 gangs, more than double the number identified six years earlier. In addition to violent crime, drug dealing, and carjacking, some Atlanta gangs commit identity theft and credit card fraud. A 2024 survey revealed that gang membership is up 80% in Georgia since 2018, largely drive by recruitment of young Black men. Also, gang-on-gang rivalries and violence is a major problem in the Atlanta area and state.

The gang problem in Atlanta is more dynamic because some gang operations in the area are sponsored by popular local artists in the hip-hop music industry. For example, Atlanta based artists Young Thug, YFN Lucci, and Gunna were indicted on serious gang-related charges. In 2022, there was a 200% increase in gang-related charges in the city. In 2023, Money Inc named Atlanta the third worst gang city in the U.S. Also in 2023, the Georgia Bureau of Investigation (GBI) Gang Task Force counted about 1,000 gangs in the Atlanta area and stated they are responsible for at least 70% of all crime. The GBI Gang Task Force collaborates with Atlanta police to dismantle gang activity in the area.

== Human trafficking ==
Atlanta is now a major transportation hub when it comes to trafficking young girls from Mexico, and is one of the top three U.S. cities with the highest levels of sex trafficking of children.

In 2006, the sex trade generated $290 million in Atlanta. This number derives from the study "Estimating the Size and Structure of the Underground Commercial Sex Economy in Eight Major US Cities" by the Urban Institute, with 18 interviews conducted in Atlanta, and includes "prostitutes, massage parlors, and brothels" including both "pimp controlled" and "non-pimp controlled". In the study, human trafficking is defined in the section "Background on the Prevalence of Human Trafficking in the United States" as "any sex act in exchange for which anything of value is given to or received by any person (e.g., prostitution).".

Since Atlanta has “the same ready access to commercial air and ground routes that draws businesses and travelers to Atlanta also entices criminals engaged in human trafficking”. There are numerous events and conventions in Atlanta that bring many people to the city which also amplifies the issue.

In 2023, Atlanta ranked second only behind Washington, D.C. in human trafficking activity. The majority of gangs in Atlanta are involved in human trafficking. The average age of a child being bought and sold is between 12 and 14 years old.

== Notable incidents ==
- Atlanta murders of 1979–1981 — A series of murders that started from the summer of 1979 and ended in the spring of 1981. Twenty children were killed in this incident.
- Atlanta prison riots — A series of riots in 1987. More than 100 people were taken hostage, and a portion of the Atlanta Federal Penitentiary was burned.
- Centennial Olympic Park bombing — A terrorist bombing that killed two people and injured 111 others during the 1996 Summer Olympics.
- 1999 Atlanta day trading firm shootings — A shooting spree that occurred at two Atlanta-area day trading firms on July 29, 1999, in which nine people were killed and 13 other people injured.
- Brian Nichols — A criminal known for his 2005 escape and killing spree in the Fulton County Courthouse and the later killing an off-duty federal agent.
- 2021 Atlanta spa shootings — A shooting spree that occurred at three Atlanta-area spas on March 16, 2021, in which eight people were killed and one other person injured.

== See also ==
- Crime in Georgia
- Law of Georgia (U.S. state)
- FBI Atlanta Field Office
- Crime in the United States
