= Richard S. Jaffe =

American lawyer (born 1950)

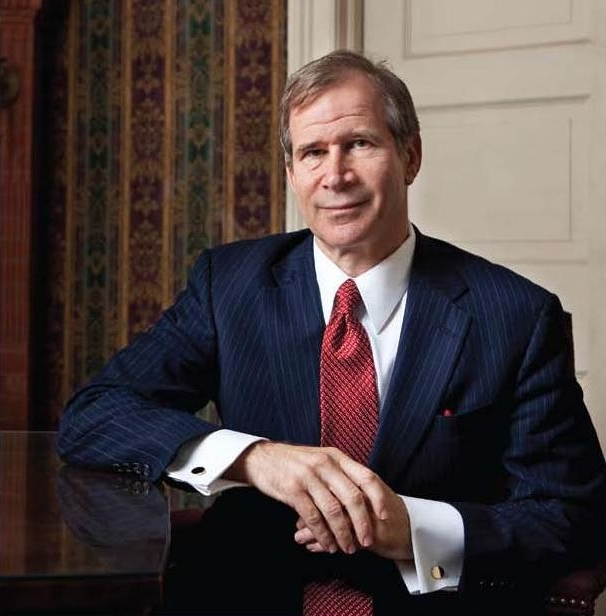
- Born: February 27, 1950 (age 76)
- Education: University of Alabama (BA, JD)
- Occupation: Lawyer
- Employer(s): Jaffe, Hanle, Whisonant & Knight, P.C.
- Notable work: Quest for Justice: Defending the Damned

Richard S. Jaffe (born February 27, 1950) is an American lawyer.

== Awards and recognition ==
The American College of Trial Lawyers inducted Jaffe as a fellow in 2013.

In 2019, Jaffe was inducted into the "Hall of Fame Attorneys" by B-Metro Magazine.

In 2012, Jaffe received an NAACP community service award.

== Select publications ==
- Jaffe, Richard S. (2012). Quest for Justice: Defending the Damned. Far Hills, N.J.: New Horizon Press. ISBN 978-0882823744. OCLC 741539038.
