= Jack Mack and the Heart Attack =

American musical band

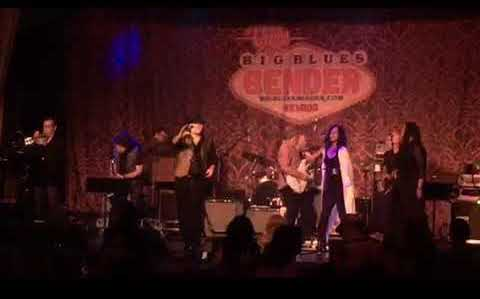
- Jack Mack Live in 2017 in Las Vegas

Background information
- Also known as: Jack Mack
- Origin: Venice, Los Angeles, California, U.S.
- Genres: Blue-eyed soul, funk, blues, R&B, soul
- Years active: 1980–present
- Labels: Full Moon/Warner Bros., Voss Records, Superstar Factory, SSR Free Roll Records
- Members: Andrew Kastner; Bill Bergman; Mark Campbell; Roy Weigand; Carlos Murguia; Kathy Merrick; Niki J Crawford; Richard Grossman; Greg Brown
- Past members: John "JP" Paruolo; Greg Smith; Jim Coile; Scott Chambers; Lee Thornburg; Claude "Jack Mack" Pepper; Max Carl (aka Max Gronenthal); Jerry Jumonville; John "JB" Berry; Garret Atkinson; Rick Shlosser; Peter Frieberger; Kevin Wells; Dennis Farias; Rick Braun; Dan Fornero; Les Lovitt; Tim Scott; Kevin Cloud; Tony Braunagel; Gavin Christopher; TC Moses; CeCe Worrall; David Lee Watson; Pamela Mattioli; Paula Mattioli; Teddy Andreadis; Will Rize; Les Falconer; Bruce Atkinson; Davey Farragher; Robin Swenson; Larry Antonino; Greg Brown; Terry Landry
- Website: jackmack.com

Jack Mack and the Heart Attack is an American soul and R&B band that was formed in 1980 in Los Angeles, California. Their debut album, Cardiac Party, was produced by Glenn Frey of The Eagles on Irving Azoff's Full Moon Records/Warner Bros. label. They are known for performing in and writing songs for many major motion pictures and television shows as well as being the house band for Fox TV's The Late Show. They were the band that was performing at the 1996 Summer Olympics in Atlanta, Georgia when a pipe bomb exploded near the sound tower. This event is depicted in the film Richard Jewell, directed by Clint Eastwood, which was released on December 13, 2019, as well as the Netflix TV series Manhunt Season 2, released in 2020.

== Career ==
=== Formation ===
Jack Mack and the Heart Attack are a Los Angeles, California, soul and R&B band that was formed in 1980 by guitarist Andrew Kastner, drummer Jack Mack (aka Claude Pepper), and drummer Rick Shlosser. Jack Mack started as an 11-piece band with Rick Shlosser and Jack Mack on drums, Kastner on guitar, Bill Bergman on tenor sax, John Paruolo on Hammond B3 organ, Lee Thornburg on trumpet and flugelhorn, Scott Chambers on bass, Max Gronenthal aka Max Carl on lead vocals, guitar and keyboards, Jerry Jumonville on tenor sax, Greg Smith on baritone sax, and John Berry on trumpet.

Before booking any gigs, the band rehearsed for several months, focusing on obscure soul tunes and a fast-paced show that featured their dancing 5-piece horn section, “The Heart Attack Horns.” Lee Thornburg and John (JB) Berry had played with Wayne Cochran & the CC Riders before moving to LA, and with them came the CC Rider dance steps and horn arrangements. The band's first gig was at the Blue Lagoon Saloon in Venice; however, they soon started playing every Monday night on Sunset Blvd. at The Central (now known as The Viper Room).

As their popularity grew, lines started forming around the block, so the band moved down the street to Club Lingerie. They performed there until one night in 1982 — the LA fire marshals came in during one of their performances and closed the club down for hosting 900 patrons. The club's legal capacity was 325. Jack Mack's fast-paced, highly polished, dynamic soul show with their dancing horns made Club Lingerie "the" place to be in LA on those Thursday nights. Celebrities, rockstars, and TV & film producers often attended to hear Jack Mack, and on many occasions producers would ask Jack Mack to appear in or record songs for their film and TV projects, such as Police Academy, Tuff Turf, and Beverly Hills Cop II. One of those producers was Penny Marshall, who asked the band to appear in an episode of Laverne & Shirley (aired January 25, 1983).

=== Full Moon/Warner Bros. Records ===
On December 31, 1981, guitarist Andrew Kastner was in a car accident; while he was in the hospital, guitarist Josh Leo took his place. Josh at the time was playing on Eagles founding member Glenn Frey's solo album, and he invited Glenn to come see a Jack Mack performance. After seeing the band at the Club Lingerie, Glenn brought the Heart Attack Horns into the studio to record on his first solo album, No Fun Aloud. He became fond of the band and their sound; within weeks, they were signed to Full Moon/Warner Bros. Records owned by Irving Azoff (manager of the Eagles) and Dan Fogelberg. They released the album Cardiac Party, produced by Glenn Frey for Full Moon Records, in 1982.

After the album release, Jack Mack began touring and continued appearing in TV shows and films, as well as performing backup for famous artists and performing on their records. Notably, the band performed in the 1982/83 second annual MTV New Year's Eve concert in New York City with Duran Duran and A Flock of Seagulls. They also wrote and recorded 4 songs for the film, Police Academy (notably the song "I'm Gonna Be Somebody"). In June 1984, Mark Campbell became the band's lead vocalist, and the band performed in the film, Tuff Turf, which starred James Spader and Robert Downey Jr.

=== Voss Records ===
In 1988, Jack Mack was signed to Voss Records and became the house band for Fox TV's The Late Show backing up artists such as Joe Walsh, The Rascals, Bobby Womack, Ginger Baker, and many others. Their album Jack it Up was released in 1990. Combining soul and rock, the retro-style effort recalled the days when blue-eyed soulsters like Rare Earth, the Spencer Davis Group, the Rascals, and Blood, Sweat & Tears dominated the music world. Jack Mack & the Heart Attack was greatly inspired by Stax/Volt, Motown, and Rock and Soul.

=== 1996 Centennial Park Olympic Bombing ===
In July 1996 the band was engaged to perform at the XXVI Olympiad, the international multi-sport event being held in Atlanta, Georgia. In the early morning of July 27, 1996, shortly after the band performed their original tune "I Walked Alone", a pipe bomb exploded in very close proximity to the stage, directly killing 1 person, and injuring 111. There were about 40,000 people attending the concert.

This event is the basis of the 2019 Clint Eastwood film Richard Jewell. The film, released by Warner Bros. Pictures on December 13, 2019, features actual video footage from Centennial Park in Atlanta in 1996 of Jack Mack performing two songs, "I Walked Alone" and "I'll Take You There."

=== Jack Mack Entertainment ===
In 1999, Jack Mack and the Heart Attack released the album Arrhythmia independently under Jack Mack Entertainment. In 2003 Jack Mack, in conjunction with Olympic Gold Medalist Scott Hamilton, released the live recording Scott Hamilton & Friends: Live in Philadelphia. Jack Mack released Club Lingerie - Live in 2005, a recording from their show at Club Lingerie in 1982. In 2006, they released By Request. In 2011 Jack Mack and The Heart Attack celebrated their 30th Anniversary by releasing Soul Meeting, featuring special guests vocalists Bill Champlin (Sons of Champlin, Chicago), Max Carl (38 Special, Grand Funk Railroad), Mike Finnigan (Crosby Stills & Nash, Bonnie Raitt, Taj Mahal), Tim Scott, Curtis Salgado (Multiple Soul Blues award winner), and the band's longtime lead vocalist, Mark Campbell. Also in 2011 the band released their compilation album The Best of Jack Mack & The Heart Attack. In 2013, Jack Mack released their Lookin' Up - EP produced by Grammy award winner, Tom Hambridge.

=== SSR Free Roll Records ===
In 2016, Jack Mack released their album Back to the Shack, produced by Bill Bergman & Andrew Kastner under SSR/Free Roll Records (John Heithaus, Executive Producer). The band was Mark Campbell, lead vocals; Andrew Kastner, guitars; Carlos Murguia, keyboards; Bruce Atkinson, bass; and Les Falconer, drums. The Heart Attack Horns were Bill Bergman, sax, and Les Lovitt on trumpet. The band brought in other special guests including former members Tony Braunagel, drums, and Lee Thornburg on trumpet, trombone, and friends of the band Mike Finnigan, keyboards and vocals, Ed Berghoff, Acoustic Guitar, and Melanie Taylor, Niki J. Crawford and Kathy Merrick on backing vocals. Nine of the ten songs were newly written by Kastner, Campbell, and Bergman. All but one of the horn arrangements were by Bergman, the other by Lee Thornburg.

=== Richard Jewell ===
In 2019, Clint Eastwood's producer Tim Moore contacted the band, seeking video footage of Jack Mack for Eastwood's upcoming film Richard Jewell. Fortunately, Kastner had saved a box of video from the band's seven nights of performances at the 1996 Olympics in Centennial Park. The band ended up licensing the footage and two of their songs for the film.

=== Live from Centennial Park, Atlanta 1996 ===
Live From Centennial Park, Atlanta 1996 was released on December 6, 2019, featuring the actual recording of the band's live performance at the XXVI Olympiad in Atlanta in Centennial Park, and includes songs recorded on the night the pipe bomb exploded. The album features two songs performed in Clint Eastwood's film Richard Jewell. This collection of originals and classic soul covers places the listener right in the middle of what became one of history's most infamous terrorist attacks.

Jack Mack released the single "Jealous Heart" on December 12, 2019.

== Members ==
Current members

- Andrew Kastner – Guitar (1980–present)
- Bill Bergman – Tenor Sax (1980–present)
- Mark Campbell – Lead Vocals (1984–present)
- Roy Weigand – Trumpet (1992–1994, 2016–present)
- Carlos Murguia – Keyboards, Vocals (2011–present)
- Kathy Merrick – Vocals (2016–present)
- Niki J Crawford – Vocals (2016–present)
- Greg Brown – Drums (2016–present)
- Richard Grossman – Bass, Vocals (2019–present)

Former members

- John "JP" Paruolo – Keyboards (1980-1998)
- Greg Smith – Baritone Sax (1980-1995)
- Jim Coile – Tenor Sax (1980-1986)
- Scott Chambers – Bass (1980-1985)
- Lee Thornburg – Trumpet, Flugel Horn, Arrangements, Vocals (1980-1985)
- Claude "Jack Mack" Pepper – Drums, Vocals (1980-1985)
- Max Carl (aka Max Gronenthal) – Lead Vocals, Guitar, Keyboards (1980-1984)
- Jerry Jumonville – Tenor Sax (1980-1981)
- John "JB" Berry – Trumpet (1980-1991)
- Garret Atkinson – Trombone (1980-1981)
- Rick Shlosser – Drums (1980-1981)
- Peter Frieberger – Bass (1984-1985)
- Kevin Wells – Drums, Vocals (1985-1988)
- Dennis Farias – Trumpet (1986-1992)
- Rick Braun – Trumpet, Vocals (1989-1992)
- Dan Fornero – Trumpet (1991-1993)
- Les Lovitt – Trumpet (1992-2016)
- Tim Scott – Bass, Vocals (1992-2008)
- Kevin Cloud – Drums, Vocals (1996-2002)
- Tony Braunagel – Drums, Vocals (1992-1998)
- Gavin Christopher – Lead Vocals (1992-1995)
- TC Moses – Lead Vocals (1994-1998)
- CeCe Worrall - Baritone Sax (2002-2006)
- David Lee Watson – Bass, Vocals (2002-2005)
- Pamela Mattioli – Vocals (2005-2009)
- Paula Mattioli – Vocals (2005-2009)
- Teddy Andreadis – Keyboards, Vocals (2005-2009)
- Will Rize – Lead Vocals (2007-2009)
- Les Falconer – Drums (2009-2014)
- Bruce Atkinson – Bass, Vocals (2009-2011)
- Davey Farragher – Bass, Vocals (2011-2014)
- Robin Swenson – Keyboards (2012-2014)
- Larry Antonino – Bass, Vocals (2014-2018)
- Terry Landry – Baritone Sax

== Discography ==
=== Studio albums ===
- 1982: Cardiac Party
- 1990: Jack It Up
- 1999: Arrhythmia
- 2006: By Request
- 2011: Soul Meeting
- 2013: Lookin' Up - EP
- 2016: Back to the Shack

=== Live albums ===
- 2003: Live in Philadelphia
- 2005: Club Lingerie Live - 1982
- 2019: Live From Centennial Park Atlanta 1996

=== Compilation albums ===
- 2009: The Best of Jack Mack & The Heart Attack

=== Singles ===
- 1984: "I'm Gonna Be Somebody"
- 2009: "All I Want for Christmas is You"
- 2014: "Sex Machine"
- 2019: "Jealous Heart"

=== Television appearances ===
- 1982: Peppermint Video (United Kingdom)
- 1982/1983: MTV New Year's
- 1983: Laverne & Shirley (written to feature band)
- 1983: Rock 'N Roll Tonight
- 1983: Video Jukebox (HBO)
- 1983: Thicke of the Night
- 1983: Pop and Rocker Shove
- 1983: Live From the Palace
- 1984: AM Los Angeles Motion Picture Appearance
- 1984: Laugh Trax
- 1987: Miami Vice
- 1987: Nightlife with David Brenner
- 1987: Easter Seals Telethons
- 1987: Beach Days (KADY TV)
- 1987: Keep On Cruisin'
- 1988: The Late Show (Fox TV) Performed as House Band
- 1988: On the Fritz
- 1989: Endless Summer (The Beach Boys)
- 1990: "It Don't Bother Me" Video
- 1991: Operation Support...Live From Camp Pendleton
- 2002: Scott Hamilton & Friends, Live in Philadelphia - featuring: Susan Anton
- 2020: Manhunt - Season 2

=== Film ===
- 1983: Spring Break
- 1983: Class Reunion
- 1984: Grandview, U.S.A.
- 1984: Hard To Hold
- 1984: Police Academy
- 1985: Porky's Revenge!
- 1985: Back to the Future
- 1985: Tuff Turf Soundtrack
- 1986: Vamp
- 1987: Beverly Hills Cop 2
- 1988: 18 Again!
- 1989: The Experts
- 1985: Doin' Time
- 2019: Richard Jewell
