= Otherside Lounge bombing =

American domestic terrorist attack

Coordinates: 33.809°N 84.366°W

- Location: 1924 Piedmont Road, Atlanta, Georgia, United States
- Date: February 21, 1997
- Target: Otherside Lounge
- Attack type: Bombing, attempted mass murder, terrorist attack
- Weapon: Pipe bomb
- Deaths: 0
- Injuries: 5
- Perpetrator: Eric Rudolph
- Motive: Lesbophobia

The Otherside Lounge bombing was a domestic terrorist attack that occurred on February 21, 1997, in Atlanta, Georgia, United States. At approximately 9:45 p.m., a pipe bomb exploded at the Otherside Lounge lesbian bar injuring 5 people, and damaging several cars in the parking lot. The bombing had been carried out by Eric Rudolph, due to his strong opposition to the gay rights movement. Rudolph, a Christian fascist, was also responsible for the Centennial Olympic Park bombing during the 1996 Olympics and two family planning clinic bombings, causing three deaths. The Otherside Lounge had been in operation since 1990 but never fully recovered from the incident, closed two years after the bombing.

== Bombing ==
The Otherside Lounge was a nightclub located on Piedmont Road in northeast Atlanta that catered primarily to lesbians and other LGBT patrons. At approximately 9:45 p.m. on the night of February 21, 1997, a bomb located on the outdoor patio of the nightclub exploded. Initially, several people inside the bar believed that a woman had been shot, but they realized that the event had been an explosion after the woman showed that a nail from the bomb had pierced her arm. While there were no fatalities, several people were injured, with The New York Times reporting that "at least five people" had suffered injuries from the blast. At least 100 people were in the nightclub at the time of the incident. The explosion damaged the building and destroyed several cars in the parking lot. Police arrived shortly after the explosion and discovered a second bomb inside a backpack hidden in some bushes in the nightclub's parking lot. The police bomb squad used a robot to detonate this second bomb, which left a crater in the parking lot. At the time, it was thought that this second bomb could have been timed to explode after the initial bomb explosion.

== Aftermath ==
Only one patron was seriously injured and was immediately taken to Grady Memorial Hospital, where she was treated for her injuries and recovered shortly thereafter. The woman had been wounded by a nail that had severed her brachial artery; speaking later of the incident, she stated, "I almost bled to death in the bar". In total, five people were injured by the explosion. On the morning of February 23, Atlanta city officials and the Federal Bureau of Investigation held a news conference wherein Special Agent Woody Johnson of the FBI's Atlanta office noted similarities between the nightclub bombing and previous bombing incidents in the area, including at an abortion clinic in Sandy Springs, Georgia on January 16, 1997, and at Centennial Olympic Park on July 27, 1996 (Centennial Olympic Park bombing). At both the nightclub and the abortion clinic, two bombs had been placed at the scene and presumably timed to detonate some time apart from each other. Additionally, Atlanta Mayor Bill Campbell and Atlanta director of the Bureau of Alcohol, Tobacco and Firearms Jack Killorin both expressed concern that the events may have all been perpetrated by a serial bomber. In the immediate aftermath, law enforcement put up crime scene tape and blocked traffic along Piedmont Road to search for clues. On February 25, the tape was removed and the street was reopened to traffic. Additionally, cars that had been left at the parking lot since the explosion were released. During the initial aftermath of the event, Mayor Campbell outed one of the victims, who shortly thereafter lost her job because of that.

=== Terrorist groups claim responsibility ===
Shortly after the explosion, The Atlanta Journal-Constitution, Reuters, WSB-TV, and NBC's Atlanta office received letters purportedly sent by a member of the Army of God, an anti-abortion Christian terrorist group, who claimed responsibility for the attack. In the letter, the group detailed their militant opposition to homosexuality and abortions and threatened "total war" against the U.S. federal government. The group also claimed responsibility for the previous bombing of the abortion clinic. A February 25 article from CNN stated that the brother of the club's owner was a doctor who previously performed late-term abortions, though the club owner claimed that she saw no connection between that and the club bombing. In addition to the Army of God, on February 22, a voicemail was left at the Phoenix, Arizona-based Gay Community Yellow Pages that claimed that the Los Angeles-based Sons of Confederate Klan (a neo-Nazi group) had been responsible for the attack. At the time, the FBI did not release a comment regarding the claims, but a CNN article published on February 25 stated that the Army of God was the "apparent focus" of their efforts at that time. Additionally, Atlanta Chief of Police Beverly Harvard stated that they were not ruling out the possibility of a serial bomber or a copycat bomber. In a June 10 press conference, investigators expressed confidence in the belief that the abortion clinic, nightclub, and park bombing were all perpetrated by the same bomber.

=== Eric Rudolph ===
In January 1998, another bombing occurred at an abortion clinic in Birmingham, Alabama, killing one person. Shortly thereafter, Eric Rudolph became the prime suspect for that bombing, and further forensic evidence linked him to the bombings in the Atlanta metropolitan area the previous year. In May 1998, investigators reported that Rudolph had been charged for the Birmingham bombing and was wanted for questioning regarding the Atlanta bombings. By December 1998, based on forensics analysis of the Atlanta bombings, Rudolph was further charged with those bombings as well. At the time, Rudolph was still on the run, and, according to the Southern Poverty Law Center, "the object of one of the largest sustained manhunts in FBI history". In November 2000, grand juries officially indicted Rudolph for the bombings. On May 30, 2003, Rudolph was arrested in Murphy, North Carolina. On June 2, he appeared before a Federal judge. In April 2005, Rudolph admitted to committing all four bombings as part of a plea bargain where he would avoid the death penalty, instead being sentenced to four life sentences in prison. Rudolph claimed that he had targeted the Otherside Lounge because he believed that the gay rights movement was "a direct assault upon the long-term health and integrity of civilization" and that, while he did not mind closeted homosexuality, he believed that societal acceptance of it "should be ruthlessly opposed".

=== Otherside Lounge ===
The nightclub reopened within a week of the bombing, but attendance remained significantly lower than before the incident. According to a 2017 article from The Georgia Voice, "Between the loss of cashflow, equity and paying for renovations, the bombing cost Beverly [one of the owners of the nightclub] about $5.8 million." In addition, the nightclub was subject to about 20 lawsuits, mostly from former patrons, and while the club won every case, having to attend to the cases took a toll on the owners. Due to this, as well as the small payout by the nightclub's insurance, the Otherside Lounge closed about two years after the bombing. The nightclub had been in operation since 1990.

The building that housed the nightclub was located next door to the Gold Massage Spa, one of the spas targeted in the 2021 Atlanta spa shootings.
