= Dorantes =

Dorantes is a Spanish surname that may refer to:

- Marco Antonio Dorantes García, retired Mexican association football referee
- Irma Dorantes, Mexican actress, singer, and equestrian
- Andrés Dorantes de Carranza, Spanish explorer
- Sergio Dorantes, Mexican photojournalist
- Genero Espinosa Dorantes, Mexican criminal
- Carmen Dorantes Martínez, Mexican politician

It may also refer to:

- Urbanus dorantes, a New World butterfly of the family Hesperiidae
