= Donald Spitz =

American Christian militant leader

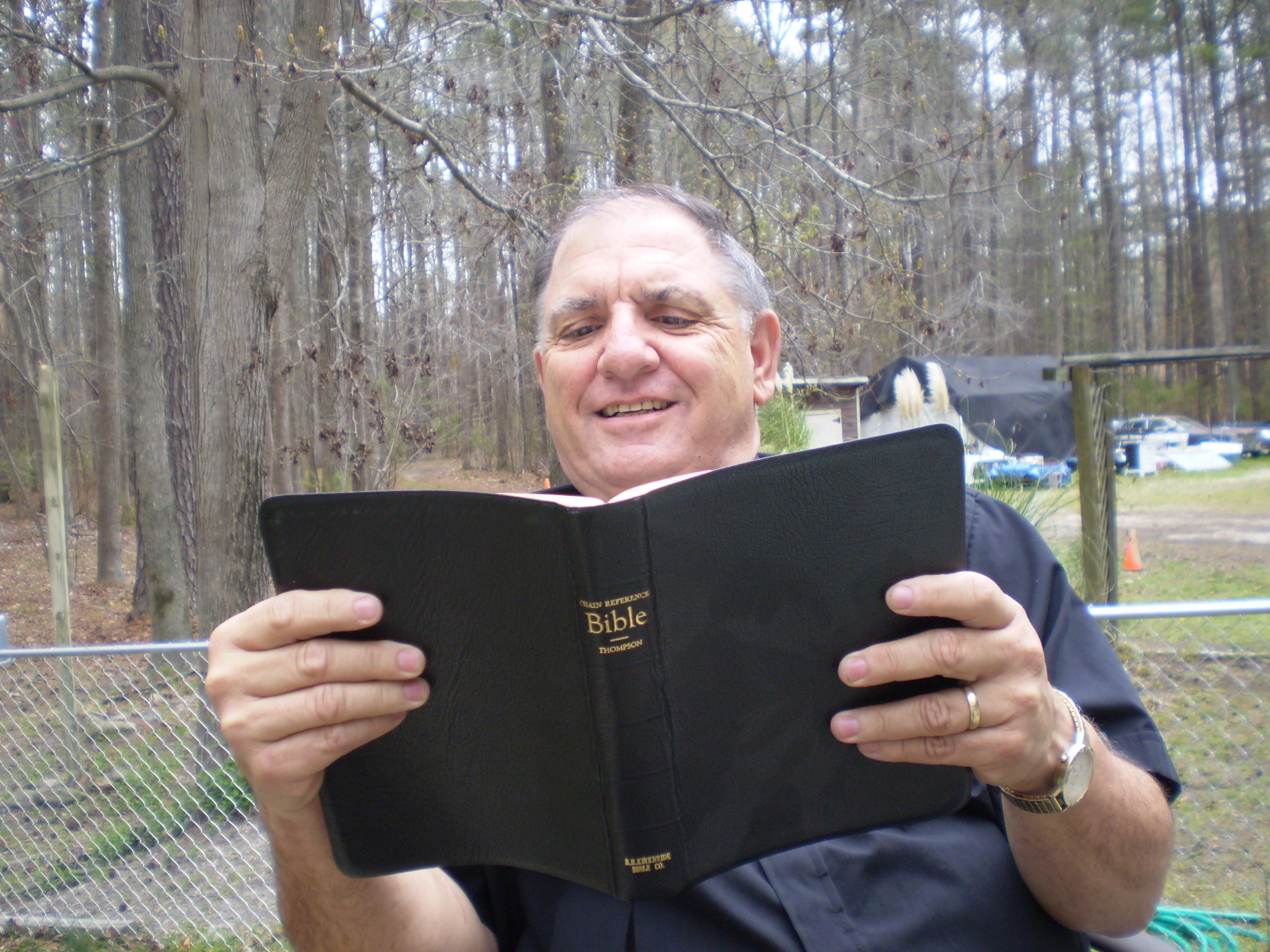
- Spitz in 2011

Personal life
- Born: Norfolk, Virginia, United States

Religious life
- Religion: Christianity
- Denomination: Pentecostalism

Donald Spitz is an American Pentecostal minister and anti-abortion activist who serves as the spokesperson and webmaster for the Army of God, an anti-abortion Christian terrorist organization that has been identified as an active underground terrorist organization by the Department of Justice and Department of Homeland Security's joint Terrorism Knowledge Base. He lives in Chesapeake, Virginia, where he has been watched by the Federal Bureau of Investigation (FBI) for over 20 years.

== Biography ==
Spitz is a first-generation Italian-American whose family emigrated from Sant'Elia Fiumerapido, Italy and settled in Paterson, New Jersey. Spitz was born in Norfolk, Virginia, into a military family. He joined the United States Navy at 18 and served for two years during the Vietnam War. In the early 1980s, Spitz moved to New York City, where he ran a street evangelism ministry in Times Square.

Spitz was ordained in Manhattan by evangelist Leander Bolhoarst into the Pentecostal International Gospel Crusade.

In 1993, Spitz moved to Chesapeake, Virginia where he formed Operation Rescue Chesapeake, then Pro-Life Virginia. He currently operates Army of God's website.

== Activity ==
Spitz was "best friends" with Paul Jennings Hill until Hill, who murdered physician John Britton and retired Air Force Lieutenant Colonel (and Britton's bodyguard) James Barrett, was executed. Spitz was Hill's spiritual adviser during the last week of his life, and was with Hill when he was executed. Spitz was one of the 29 signers of the Defensive Action Statement, which he posted on Army of God's website. The Defensive Action Statement argued that the murders Hill committed were justified to protect unborn children.

Spitz was ordered to appear before two separate grand juries. The grand juries were held in Alexandria, Virginia and, in Philadelphia during separate investigations into Hill and Clayton Waagner, a man who sent hundreds of anthrax scare letters to abortion providers in 2001.

After John Salvi attacked two reproductive health clinics in Massachusetts, he drove to Norfolk, Virginia where Spitz lived at the time. It was reported by the Boston Globe, that at the time of his arrest in Norfolk, Salvi had Spitz's name and unlisted phone number in his possession. Spitz held a prayer vigil outside Salvi's jail cell. Spitz was so outspoken in defense of Salvi, that he was asked not to come to Massachusetts for Salvi’s trial, and he would be unwelcome if he did.

Spitz was ejected from Operation Rescue. He formed Operation Rescue Chesapeake, but after a year and a half, when Flip Benham took control of the national organization, Spitz was ordered to separate himself and his organization from the Operation Rescue name because of his support and friendship with Hill. Spitz changed the name of his organization from Operation Rescue Chesapeake to Pro-Life Virginia.

Spitz gained attention in 2001 with his support for Waagner, who was one of the FBI's Ten Most Wanted Fugitives, who sent hundreds of anthrax letters to abortion clinics throughout the United States. Spitz was also suspected of harboring Waagner and receiving phone calls from him while Waagner was a fugitive.

In response to the 1998 shooting death of Barnett Slepian, Spitz said: "What would I say to the family of Slepian? They live in a $500,000 house that was paid for with blood money – the blood of those babies that Barnett Slepian murdered... He knew what he was doing, he was murdering children. That's too bad if he was killed in front of his family..."

Spitz has been watched by the Federal Bureau of Investigation (FBI) for over 20 years. In 1994, the FBI suspected that he and other anti-abortion figures might be developing "a conspiracy that endeavors to achieve political or social change through activities that involve force or violence."

Spitz has published prison writings of fellow extremists including Hill, Waagner, Eric Rudolph, Shelley Shannon, and Michael Bray, on Army of God's website. Spitz was in constant contact with Scott Roeder while he was awaiting trial for the murder of George Tiller. Shelley Shannon, an anti-abortion extremist, made her first phone call when she was released from federal prison to Spitz. It is reported they had been in close contact the whole time of Shannon's incarceration.
