= Joe Saenz =

American gangster, murderer and rapist

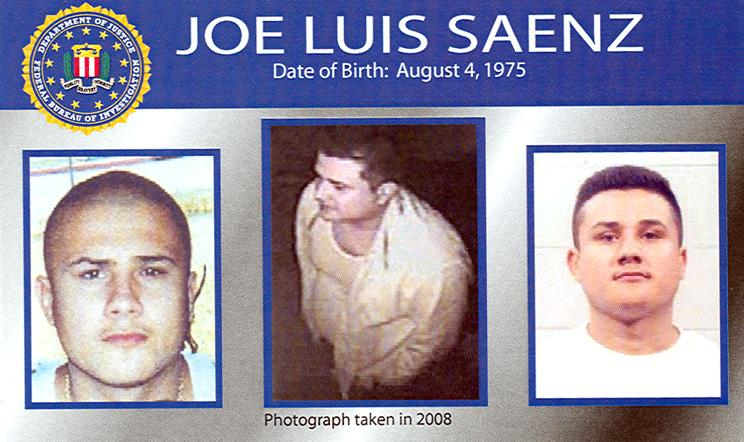

FBI Ten Most Wanted Fugitive
- Charges: Unlawful Flight to Avoid Prosecution - Murder; Kidnapping; Rape; Parole violation
- Reward: US$100,000
- Alias: Joe Luis Saenz; Gabriel Saenz; "Zapp"; "Smiley"; "Honeycutt"

Description
- Born: Jose Luis Saenz; August 4, 1975 (age 51) or October 1, 1975 (age 50) or December 31, 1975 (age 50) or May 1, 1976 (age 50); Los Angeles, California, U.S.
- Nationality: US
- Race: Hispanic
- Gender: Male
- Height: 5 ft 11 in (1.80 m) to 6 ft 0 in (1.83 m)
- Weight: 180 lb (82 kg)

Status
- Convictions: Two counts of Murder
- Penalty: Life in prison without the possibility of parole plus 113 years
- Added: October 19, 2009
- Caught: November 22, 2012
- Number: 492
- Captured

Jose Luis Saenz, known as Joe Saenz, is an American gangster and former fugitive charged with four murders, rape, kidnapping, parole violation and unlawful flight to avoid prosecution. On October 19, 2009, he was named by the FBI as the 492nd fugitive to be placed on the list of FBI Ten Most Wanted Fugitives. On November 22, 2012, he was found and arrested in Guadalajara, Mexico by the Federal Police.

== Early life and education ==
Saenz was born in Los Angeles, to a Maravilla gang member Mexican father and a Mexican mother who had substance abuse problems. An only child, he lived most of childhood with his grandmother in a small backyard bungalow on Ferris Avenue. He spent much of his time with his cousins at the Pico-Aliso housing projects.

Saenz attended high school in Los Angeles Unified School District, but dropped out. Before the murders in 1998, the Saenz family had been evicted for an unspecified violation.

== Criminal charges ==
=== 1998: Double murder in Aliso Village ===
Saenz, known by his nickname "Smiley" and fellow Cuatro Flats gang member Juan Pena allegedly lured two rival East Los Angeles Trece gang members with a drug deal. Saenz allegedly shot and killed the unarmed men, Josue Hernandez and Leonardo Ponce execution-style in front of 210 North Clarence Street in the Aliso Village area of Boyle Heights in Los Angeles on July 25, 1998.

Ponce was shot in the chest, thigh and back and Hernandez was shot three times in the head. The motive behind the murders is thought to have been retaliation for the assault of Pena by members of the same gang a week earlier.

=== 1998: Kidnapping, rape, and murder ===
According to authorities, Saenz, who was on parole at the time of the shooting, fled from the scene and hid in the apartment of Sigreda Hernandez, his former girlfriend and the mother of his two-year-old daughter. On August 5, 1998, Hernandez was kidnapped (allegedly by Saenz and his accomplices) and taken to Saenz's grandmother's house in an unincorporated area of East Los Angeles. There, Saenz told his grandmother to leave her own home. She later claimed that she complied because Saenz said he and Hernandez were trying to reconcile.

Three hours later, at 11 a.m., Saenz called his grandmother and told her not to come home, telling her he had "just made a big mistake." She did, however, return to the bungalow, where she discovered the body of Hernandez in the back bedroom, sprawled half-nude with a bullet wound to her temple.

Detectives found a pile of .357 Magnum shells on a dresser and a note from Saenz: "the guys who drove me hear [sic] have nothing to do with this." Saenz also wrote a message scrawled in pencil on the living room wall, in which he asked his grandmother to take care of his child and that he loved her. Hernandez has been speculated to have been murdered because she knew about Saenz's crimes.

Shortly after, Juan Pena was arrested for the Clarence Street murders after a tipster placed him at the scene with Saenz. Pena, who was 14 years old at the time, was later convicted of two murders, despite the fact he was not the shooter. Possibly because of his fatal illness, he unexpectedly gave a detailed confession of the murders to authorities. He died of childhood leukemia at the California Youth Authority in 2001.

In 1998, Saenz was charged with three counts of murder, one count of kidnapping and one count of rape, and a warrant was secured for his arrest. Los Angeles City Council has offered a reward of $75,000, for information leading to the capture and conviction of person(s) responsible for those crimes. Despite the arrest warrant and reward, there were no other suspects or conclusive leads of Saenz's whereabouts until a decade later.

=== 2008: Murder of Oscar Torres ===
In August 2008, two members of the Lott Stoner gang were stopped by a Missouri state trooper while driving a rental vehicle. A search turned up $610,000 in cash in a hidden compartment, wrapped and marked with the name "Toro," which is now alleged to be one of Saenz’s aliases. The money was confiscated by the police. One of the gang members was a 38-year-old drug trafficker Oscar Torres, a friend of Saenz.

On October 5, 2008, Anthony Limon had agreed as a favor to Torres to drive four men in his Hummer limousine that night, picking up the first three and taking them to the Elephant Bar restaurant in suburban Lakewood, where they picked up Saenz. Later, he ordered Limon to drive to Montebello, then at 5 a.m. ordered him to drive to the limo owner's home in Whittier. Saenz was filmed on a home surveillance system arriving at Torres' house, chasing him out of his front door and then shooting Torres four times in the head, possibly due to lost money. The DVD disc that had captured the shooting was removed from the surveillance system. However, shortly after the investigation of the homicide, video of the murder was retrieved from the security equipment's hard drive, leading investigators to identify Saenz as the shooter.

Inside the home where Torres was murdered, detectives found Limon, who had been shot in the back, but survived. Forty handguns and assault rifles, and a short rifle were found inside Torres' home. A month later, Saenz's cousin Johnny Prado was arrested for murder and attempted murder, and was sentenced to imprisonment for 26 years in November 2009.

== Investigation ==
Additionally, Saenz is a suspect in a homicide that happened in early 1997. Although there are rumors linking Jose Saenz to a kidnapping of a woman in Los Angeles and to the death of drug trafficker Bogart Bello for a failed drug deal in 2008, he has never been charged for those crimes.

Saenz was added to the list of FBI Ten Most Wanted Fugitives on October 19, 2009, replacing another Los Angeles gang member Emigdio Preciado, Jr. During the time that he was a fugitive, he was believed to have been living in Mexico, possibly working as an enforcer for a drug cartel and traveling across the Mexico – United States border using numerous aliases as well as legitimate identity documents obtained fraudulently. Saenz had been considered armed and extremely dangerous, and had "vowed to kill police officers if they try to arrest him" in 1998. FBI had offered a reward of up to $100,000 for information leading to his capture.

== Arrest ==
On November 22, 2012 he was found and arrested in Guadalajara, Mexico by the Federal Police while working for a Mexican drug cartel. After his arrest, Mexico extradited him to the United States.

Saenz managed to elude authorities for over 14 years. Investigators revealed that after initially fleeing to Mexico, he continued to stay on the move, using as many as twenty aliases and moving throughout Mexico, Central America, the United States, and Canada. Upon being deported, Saenz bragged about his time on the run and claimed to authorities that he had attended Los Angeles Lakers basketball games while on the run.
