= Iriana (given name) =

Iriana is a feminine given name. Notable people with the name include:

- Iriana DeJesus (1994/95 – 2000), American murder victim
- Iriana Halim (born 1980), Singaporean television host
- Iriana Joko Widodo (born 1963), former First Lady of Indonesia
