= Unborn child (disambiguation) =

Unborn child may refer to:

- A human in any stage of prenatal development from fertilization to birth
- Unborn Child, an album by Seals and Crofts
- Unborn Child, a track on the album Acoustic - Lullabies Limited Edition by Lucien Nocelli

== See also ==
- The Unborn (disambiguation)
- Unborn in the USA, a documentary about abortion
