= Edward Eugene Harper =

American former fugitive

FBI Ten Most Wanted Fugitive
- Charges: Unlawful flight to avoid prosecution; Conspiracy to commit sexual battery; Child fondling; Sexual battery

Description
- Born: March 1, 1946 (age 80); New Mexico, U.S.
- Nationality: (United States) American

Status
- Convictions: Sexual battery (6 counts); Fondling (2 counts); Conspiracy to commit sexual battery (2 counts)
- Added: November 29, 2008
- Caught: July 23, 2009
- Number: 491
- Captured

Edward Eugene Harper (born March 1, 1946) is an American former fugitive who was wanted for sex crimes against children committed in 1993 and 1994. Harper was added to the FBI Ten Most Wanted Fugitives list on November 29, 2008. After 15 years on the run, he was captured in Wyoming by the FBI on July 23, 2009.

== Background ==
=== Early life and family ===
Edward Eugene Harper was born in New Mexico to Nell Trimue Harper, a Baptist from Forrest City, Arkansas. Edward Harper has at least three sisters, he has been married twice and has two children.

=== Personal life ===
Harper had little formal education.

He reportedly subscribed to the Sovereign citizen movement ideology and claimed to be a member of the Montana Freemen, although authorities have never been able to confirm his affiliation with the group.

Harper was diagnosed with schizotypal personality disorder by a behavioral psychologist in Mississippi, shortly after his 1994 arrest. The disorder is characterized by a desire for social isolation, social anxiety and odd behavior. Harper is described as a survivalist, who has lived outside of modern society, but according to FBI Special Agent Ryan Arton he "could distinguish right from wrong".

== Child molestation accusations ==
From fall of 1993 to March 1994, Harper molested two girls in Hernando, Mississippi. In 1993, Harper, who was forty-eight years old, lived with his eighteen-year-old wife, Debra Busby, in a trailer park in DeSoto County, Mississippi.

According to Arton, the FBI Special Agent, Harper and his then-19-year-old wife began to look after one of his victims, a three-year-old girl, whose homeless mother could not take care for her. Sexual abuse by Harper and his wife Debra began within a month. The second victim was an eight-year-old girl who lived in the neighborhood. Arton said Harper threatened his wife and victims with violence if they ever told anyone of the abuse.

In March 1994, after the girls told their parents about the sexual abuse, police obtained a search warrant. When Harper's trailer home was raided, he had already fled. After the raid, a highway officer in Utah performed a routine traffic stop and pulled over Harper and his wife. When the officer ran his name, the warrant came to his attention. Harper was arrested and extradited back to Mississippi. Harper was indicted on April 27, 1994 and released on $20,000 bond, but he failed to appear for a court hearing and his bond was revoked. A state warrant was issued for his arrest on October 31, 1994, in DeSoto County, Mississippi. Subsequently, a federal arrest warrant was issued for Harper by the United States District Court for the Northern District of Mississippi, after he was charged in violation of unlawful flight to avoid prosecution on February 5, 1999.

== Fugitive ==
During Harper's time on the run, his mother received several letters from "Ed Harmon" - an alias used by Edward Harper. The letters mentioned him doing ranch work in Montana and Wyoming.

Harper's phone calls to his half-sister mentioned "cattle work", but he did not reveal his location. His mother died in 1998, and her obituary mentioned that her son Edward E. Harper was living in Montana.

He was placed on Oprah Winfrey's Child Predator Watch List and was profiled on the television program America's Most Wanted: America Fights Back.

On November 29, 2008 Harper was named by the FBI as the 491st fugitive to be placed on the Ten Most Wanted Fugitives. He replaced Michael Registe on the list. There was a reward of up to $100,000 for information leading to Harper's capture being offered by the FBI. The reward will be paid to the tipster.

Harper lived a nomadic lifestyle, living in a truck with a camper top, moving from place to place, and earning a living by doing odd jobs and herding sheep. He would make trips to buy groceries and tobacco to the general store in Kaycee, which was said to be the nearest town to his camp. Harper himself told the judge he had been living on and off for 15 years in the Broken Horn Creek area.

== Capture ==
The FBI received a telephone tip in June at the Denver office regarding Harper, and brought a SWAT team and a hostage negotiation team to apprehend him. He was captured in Washakie County, Wyoming in the southern portion of the Big Horn Mountains on July 23, 2009 by FBI and Wyoming Game and Fish Department officers after nearly 15 years on the run. Harper surrendered without an incident and admitted his identity. He had an unspecified number of handguns and rifles in his truck but was not carrying them when he was apprehended.

Harper was transported to Casper, where he was being held at the Natrona County jail and extradited to Mississippi in September 2009.

== Trial and conviction ==
Harper was convicted by the DeSoto County Circuit Court of six counts of sexual battery, two counts of fondling, and two counts of conspiracy to commit sexual battery in October 2010. Harper was sentenced to a total of fifty years to serve in the custody of the Mississippi Department of Corrections.
