= Jon Schillaci =

American child sex offender and former fugitive

FBI Ten Most Wanted Fugitive
- Charges: Unlawful flight to avoid prosecution, aggravated felonious sexual assault, felonious sexual assault; possession of child pornography (23 counts)
- Alias: Jon Willis, Christopher Keegan, Cody Keegan, Dylan Thomas, Dylan Natchitoches Pierce, Erick Anderson Lowell, Christopher D. Ahrens

Description
- Born: December 14, 1971 (age 54); Oklahoma, United States
- Occupation: student, salesman, computer specialist, webmaster

Status
- Convictions: 1990: sex performed by a child (2 counts), aggravated sexual assault (4 counts); 2009: aggravated felonious sexual assault, possession of child pornography (23 counts)
- Penalty: 1990: imprisonment of ten years 2009: imprisonment of 20 years to 50 years
- Added: September 7, 2007
- Caught: June 5, 2008
- Number: 488
- Captured

Jon Savarino Schillaci (born December 14, 1971) is an American rapist and former fugitive who was added to the FBI's Top Ten Most Wanted Fugitives list on September 7, 2007. Schillaci is the 488th fugitive to be placed on the list. He was captured on June 5, 2008, in San José de Gracia, Michoacán, Mexico, after almost nine years on the run. On December 22, 2009, Schillaci was sentenced to 20 to 50 years in prison. He is incarcerated in Northern New Hampshire Correctional Facility and will be eligible for parole in December 2039.

== Early life ==
Schillaci was born in Oklahoma in 1971 and was given up for adoption as an infant. Most of his childhood, which has been described as "turbulent", was spent in Texas. During his first prison term, Schillaci told officials he had been abused by a relative as a child. Prior to his arrest in 1989, he frequented the Neartown area of Houston. At the age of 17, Schillaci practiced transvestism. Schillaci has an educational background in behavioral sciences, computer science, drafting, philosophy, religion, and politics. He has also been described as computer savvy, an accomplished pianist, and an adequate guitarist. He attended, but did not graduate from, Clements High School in Sugar Land, Texas.

== Crimes in 1989 ==
In 1989, then 17-year-old Schillaci and a 20-year-old man were accused of sexually abusing two 11-year-old twin brothers. Schillaci and his friend befriended the brothers, who lived in an apartment with their single mother. They took the boys out for dinner and to screenings of The Rocky Horror Picture Show several times.

Later, they invited the boys to Schillaci's home, showed them a child pornography film, then videotaped the boys engaging in sexual acts with each other. After filming them, Schillaci engaged in sexual acts with both of the boys. He was arrested days later on January 29, 1989, when he tried to sell the video to an adult bookstore for $500. He pleaded guilty to two counts of sex performed by a child and four counts of aggravated sexual assault and was convicted on April 26, 1990 and sentenced to 10 years in prison.

== Incarceration in Texas ==
Schillaci, who was already fluent in Spanish, studied French and German in prison. He completed a bachelor's degree and two master's degrees in humanities and literature from the University of Houston.

Schillaci also wrote poetry and submitted his poems to a now-defunct New Hampshire literary magazine called The Fishwrapper, a quasi-underground student-run publication at the University of New Hampshire. Schillaci won first prize for poetry with his poem Americans in PEN American Center's prisoner writing contest in 1998. A Deerfield, New Hampshire family had a connection with The Fishwrapper, and they started correspondence with Schillaci by letters. They developed a pen pal relationship, which lasted throughout his incarceration, over seven years. He told the family that he was rehabilitated and about his desire for a new beginning. He wrote eloquently about how he was studying in prison and referred to crimes he had committed as "mistakes of his youth". The family believed that Schillaci was sincere and wanted to give him a place to stay after his release. Another reason for the family's trust was that Schillaci had gained acceptance to a Ph.D. program at Tufts University.

== Release and move to New Hampshire ==
After Schillaci was released from Rosharon prison on July 30, 1999, he registered as a sex offender and moved into the Deerfield family's home in early August to start a new life in New Hampshire.

Schillaci was employed at Ted Herbert's Music Mart and Art Center in Manchester. He was a salesman at the store where hundreds of children took music lessons. He also worked as a computer operator. He was studying at a nearby college, and he later enrolled at Tufts University in Medford, Massachusetts, where he studied philosophy as a non-degree student in a graduate special student program for six weeks until he fled sex crime charges.

=== Sex crime charges ===
In late October 1999, when Schillaci was returning from Tufts University, the couple's five-year-old son informed his parents that they had "a secret": Schillaci had sexually abused him during piano lessons. The family alerted authorities, and police served Schillaci with a restraining order. Schillaci reported to work the next day, and in the afternoon he fled and left his computer and car near a bus station. He gave his car keys to a coworker and told him to get rid of his truck and its contents.

After speaking with the boy, officials were able to determine that Schillaci had shown him child pornography and sexually abused him between three and seven times during his seven-week period in Deerfield. As a result, Schillaci was indicted on sexual assault charges on November 4, 1999, and a bench warrant was issued for his arrest a month later for failing to appear in court. The Boston field office of the FBI also issued a warrant for his arrest. In September 2000, Schillaci was also charged with 23 counts of possession of child pornography, when approximately 300 images of child pornography were found on the family's computer he used. According to authorities, those images contained "every type of sexual act imaginable".

== Fugitive ==
Schillaci was seen boarding a Greyhound Lines bus and heading for California. Schillaci crossed the Mexico–United States border illegally and remained in Mexico until he was captured and deported, although he traveled within the country.

Schillaci was seen in Rosarito, Baja California, Mexico, in March 2000. Before U.S. Marshals could arrive, Schillaci had fled, leaving behind allegations of improper sexual relationships with children in the town. It was believed he was working in a pediatrician's office in 2000. At the time, Schillaci had used several aliases, including Jon Willis, Christopher Keegan and Cody Keegan.

Schillaci gained an online following in the underground pedophile community, and was described as a kingpin in the world of child pornography. His networks helped him to avoid capture twice and gave financial support by donating money to his PayPal account. Using the alias Dylan Thomas (after the Welsh poet), he operated as a DJ for an Internet radio show, The Dylan Thomas Show and became a webmaster of BoyChat in 2003. BoyChat is an internet forum for "boy lovers", people who discuss their sexual attraction to young boys.

Schillaci was living in Guadalajara, Jalisco, from approximately February 2003 until September 2006 under the alias Dylan Natchitoches Pierce. Erick Anderson Lowell was one of his aliases as well.

In 2004, Gregory Alec Phillips, a convicted sex offender from Tennessee, flew from Thailand to Mexico to meet a man he knew as Dylan Thomas. Phillips lived with him for approximately 30 days. Although Phillips later claimed he never witnessed any sexual interactions, he stated that "Thomas" engaged in sex with young boys because "there were little boys in and out of there all the time". After his return to the United States, "Thomas" had asked Phillips to check on the status of "Thomas'" own outstanding warrants.

In 2005, as a part of a story filmed during the People v. Jackson trial, Dylan Thomas, a spokesman for the pedophile community, was interviewed by NBC News correspondent Josh Mankiewicz on a Mexican beach. Producers had agreed not to reveal his face or name. The interview never aired.

Schillaci was profiled on the television program America's Most Wanted, and he was added to the list of FBI Ten Most Wanted Fugitives on September 7, 2007. He replaced another sexual predator, Richard Goldberg, who was captured on May 12, 2007. Schillaci is the first fugitive from New Hampshire to have been added to the list. The FBI offered a reward of up to $100,000 for information leading to Schillaci's capture and considered Schillaci extremely dangerous.

== Investigation and capture ==
In 2007, Schillaci's activities under the alias "Dylan Thomas" caught the attention of volunteers on Wikisposure, now Evil Unveiled, a project of Perverted-Justice, which builds databases on pedophilia activists, who began to investigate and monitor his activities as "Thomas" on the Internet. Members of Wikisposure found a profile Thomas had posted on his website in 2003. In it, he discussed playing the piano to attract children's interest. A path of similar profiles was discovered across the Internet. Each profile had a different username or alias but listed something in common. A profile of a "Christopher D. Ahrens" was discovered on an engineering website that had a small photograph attached to it. A person in the photograph looked exactly like Jon Schillaci. Evidence indicated that online profiles of Dylan Thomas, Christopher Ahrens, among others, were all created by Schillaci. After Wikisposure gave the information to the FBI, authorities were able to track down the location of the computer being used by Schillaci. The FBI wouldn't comment on Wikisposure's role, citing its policy of not commenting on who provides information. According to United States v. Gregory Phillips, another sex offender who stayed with Schillaci in 2004, Gregory Phillips, reported Schillaci's location to the FBI in 2007.

After being a fugitive for eight years, Schillaci was arrested in the town of San José de Gracia, Michoacán, on June 5, 2008, without incident. When approached by the FBI and Mexican authorities, he confirmed his identity. He was living in what was described as an unkempt shack. Schillaci did not face any child pornography charges in Mexico, although Mexican authorities could still charge him.

Schillaci was briefly detained by Mexico and extradited back to the United States the next day. Schillaci was transported to Morelia, Mexico, where he boarded Mexicana Airlines to the United States. Schillaci and his FBI escort landed at Chicago O'Hare International Airport. He was then transferred to an FBI aircraft and flown to Pease International Airport in Portsmouth, New Hampshire. He was then brought to the Rockingham County Courthouse for arraignment on his charges.

== Trial and incarceration ==
In county court, Judge Tina Nadeau ordered Schillaci held without bail and entered not-guilty pleas for him until he got a lawyer. He requested a public defender. Schillaci awaited his trial in Rockingham County Jail and faced a life sentence because of his prior convictions. His trial was scheduled for early 2010.

Schillaci decided to plead guilty after prosecutors had informed a judge they would seek an enhanced sentence against Schillaci that could keep him in prison for the rest of his life.

On December 22, 2009, Jon Schillaci was sentenced to 20 to 50 years in state prison after pleading guilty to one count of aggravated felonious sexual assault and 23 counts of possession of child pornography. According to prosecutors, they agreed to make a plea agreement because Schillaci's victim (now aged 15) was unwilling to testify and wanted to maintain his anonymity. After Schillaci was apprehended, his computer, which had reams of child pornography on its hard drive, led the FBI into an expansive probe of seeking child victims in the United States. As a part of his plea bargain, Schillaci cooperated with federal authorities by offering to give the name of one person. The information has led to federal indictment of the person in question and the rescue of one sexually abused child.

Schillaci was incarcerated in New Hampshire State Prison for Men, but he was transferred to Northern New Hampshire Correctional Facility. He will be eligible for parole in December 2039. In order to be considered for parole, he would have to undergo a battery of sex offender treatment and other required programs. If Schillaci is ever released, he will also be on parole for life, and has to register as a sex offender for life.
