= Federal Correctional Institution, Waseca =

Low-security prison in Minnesota, US

Coordinates: 44°04′10″N 93°31′01″W

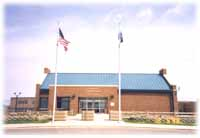
- Interactive map of Federal Correctional Institution, Waseca
- Location: Waseca, Minnesota
- Status: Operational
- Security class: Low-security
- Population: 728
- Opened: 1995
- Managed by: Federal Bureau of Prisons

The Federal Correctional Institution, Waseca (FCI Waseca) is a low-security United States federal prison for female offenders in Minnesota. It is operated by the Federal Bureau of Prisons, a division of the United States Department of Justice. The site, located 75 miles (121 km) from Minneapolis, was converted into a prison in 1992 after formerly serving as a University of Minnesota campus.

== History ==
FCI Waseca opened in 1995 as an all-male facility. It used many of the buildings from the former college. In 2006, FCI Waseca received its most high-profile prisoner when Jeffrey Skilling, CEO of the now defunct Enron Corporation was sent there after he was convicted of insider trading, securities fraud and other charges for making a $60 million profit by selling company stock in anticipation of the company's 2001 collapse. Skilling was transferred to FCI Englewood, another low-security facility in Colorado, after FCI Waseca was converted into an all-female prison in 2008.

== Notable incidents ==
The FBI was called in to investigate an act of violence at FCI Waseca in June 2011. Felecia Thomas, a 45-year-old inmate serving a sentence for arson, allegedly attempted to strangle another inmate with a rope taken from a laundry bag. Thomas pleaded guilty to assault with a dangerous weapon on January 11, 2013 and was subsequently sentenced to an additional 41 months in prison. She was scheduled to be released in 2021.

== Notable inmates (current and former) ==
Inmate Name	Register Number	Status	Details
Holly Ann Grigsby	42508-086	Serving a life sentence.	White supremacist. Convicted of helping her boyfriend, David Joseph Pedersen, murder 4 people across the Pacific Northwest in 2011.
Catherine Greig	57820-112	Originally sentenced to 21 months; extended following disciplinary action & was released July 2020; served over 8 years total.	Girlfriend of former FBI Ten Most Wanted Fugitive and Irish Mob figure James "Whitey" Bulger; pleaded guilty in 2012 to harboring a fugitive and identity fraud for illegally obtaining Social Security numbers, licenses and birth certificates in order to assist Bulger evade capture.
Angela Johnson	08337-029	Serving a life sentence; currently at FCI Aliceville.	The first woman sentenced to death by a United States federal jury since the 1950s. She was sentenced to death for her role in the murders of five people in 1993. She was re-sentenced to life without parole in December 2014. Her accomplice, Dustin Honken, was sentenced to death and executed on July 17, 2020.
Shelley Shannon	59755-065	Was serving a 20-year sentence under her real name, Rachelle Shannon; released in 2018.	Member of the extremist group Army of God; served 10 years in state prison for the attempted murder of Kansas abortion doctor George Tiller in 1993; pleaded guilty in 1995 to firebombing six abortion clinics in California, Nevada and Oregon.
Lisa Biron	12775-049	Sentenced to 40 years, scheduled for release on June 17, 2047	Transportation with intent to engage in criminal sexual activity, possession of child pornography, sexual exploitation of children
Stella Nickell		Sentenced to 90 years, scheduled for release on February 14, 2043	Killed husband and innocent stranger by poisoned Excedrin capsules with cyanide. Caused manufacturer's US-wide recall of all non-prescription capsule products and 90-day ban on the sale of non-prescription medication in capsules in Washington State. First person convicted under federal product tampering laws.

== See also ==
- List of U.S. federal prisons
- Federal Bureau of Prisons
- Incarceration in the United States
