= FBI Ten Most Wanted Fugitives, 2000s =

The FBI's Ten Most Wanted Fugitives during the 2000s is a list, maintained for a sixth decade, of the Ten Most Wanted Fugitives of the United States Federal Bureau of Investigation. At any given time, the FBI is actively searching for 12,000 fugitives. During the 2000s, 36 new fugitives were added to the list. By the close of the decade a total of 494 fugitives had been listed on the Top Ten list, of whom 463 have been captured or located.

== FBI headlines in the 2000s ==
The 2000s (decade) started out badly for the FBI's much needed attempts to upgrade technology. First, the "Trilogy" project went far over the $380 million budget, and behind its three-year schedule. Then, Virtual Case File (VCF) planned for completion in 2003, was officially abandoned in 2005, after more than $100 million spent. A new, more ambitious investigation software project, Sentinel, was introduced in 2005 as a replacement for the failed VCF system.

In 2001, Robert Hanssen, high within the Bureau, was caught selling information to the Russians, and Bureau security practices came into question.

In 2002 the FBI's official top priority became counter-terrorism, followed second by counterintelligence. The USA PATRIOT Act granted the FBI increased monitoring powers.

The 9/11 Commission in 2004 blamed the FBI in part for not pursuing intelligence reports which could have prevented the September 11, 2001 attacks. In consequence, the Bureau came under oversight by the new Director of National Intelligence.

== FBI Ten Most Wanted Fugitives to begin the 2000s ==
The FBI in the past has identified individuals by the sequence number in which each individual has appeared on the list. Some individuals have even appeared twice, and often a sequence number was permanently assigned to an individual suspect who was soon caught, captured, or simply removed, before his or her appearance could be published on the publicly released list. In those cases, the public would see only gaps in the number sequence reported by the FBI. For convenient reference, the wanted suspect's sequence number and date of entry on the FBI list appear below, whenever possible.

The following fugitives made up the top Ten list to begin the 2000s:

Name	Sequence Number	Date of Entry	Notes
Donald Eugene Webb	#375	1981	• Removed from the list on March 31, 2007. On July 14, 2017, remains found at the Dartmouth home of Webb's wife were identified as belonging to Webb. Investigators stated that Webb had died in 1999.
Victor Manuel Gerena	#386	1984	• Still at large. • Is wanted in connection with the 1983 armed robbery of approximately $7 million from a security company in Connecticut. He was removed from the list on December 15, 2016.
Arthur Lee Washington Jr.	#427	1989	• Removed from the list in December 2000 for no longer meeting the list criteria.
Agustín Vásquez Mendoza	#445	1996	• Captured • Vásquez was wanted in the murder of an undercover DEA special agent in Glendale, Arizona on June 30, 1994, during an undercover drug transaction, kidnapping, attempted armed robbery and assault in a drug conspiracy. • He was arrested in Mexico July 9, 2000.
Glen Stewart Godwin	#447	1996	• Still at large. • Godwin is being sought for his 1987 escape from Folsom State Prison in California, where he was serving a lengthy sentence for murder. Later he escaped from Mexican prison September 1991 after murdering a prison inmate in April 1991. As of May 19, 2016, he was no longer on the list.
Ramon Eduardo Arellano-Felix	#451	1997	• Killed • He was wanted in ordering a hit which resulted in the mass murder of 19 people in Ensenada September 17, 1998; charged in a sealed indictment in United States District Court for the Southern District of California, with Conspiracy to Import Cocaine and Marijuana in drug trafficking; one of the leaders of the Arellano-Felix Organization (AFO), which is also known as the Tijuana Cartel. • He was killed in a gun battle with police at Mazatlán February 10, 2002.
Eric Robert Rudolph	#454	1998	• Captured • Rudolph was wanted in a series of southeastern U.S. bombings, including a bombing murder at Centennial Olympic Park in Atlanta on July 27, 1996. • Rudolph was arrested in Murphy, North Carolina on May 31, 2003.
James Charles Kopp	#455	1999	• Captured • He was wanted for the murder of Dr. Barnett Slepian at his home in Amherst, New York, October 23, 1998 and for non-fatal shootings of three doctors in Canada in 1994, 1995 and 1997. • Kopp was arrested in Dinan, Brittany, France, March 30, 2001, and is in U.S. custody.
Osama bin Laden	#456	1999	• Killed • Osama bin Laden was the leader of al-Qaeda and was wanted in connection with the August 7, 1998, bombings of the United States embassies, Dar es Salaam, Tanzania, and Nairobi, Kenya. Bin Laden and al-Qaeda is alleged to be responsible for the October 12, 2000, attack on the USS Cole off the coast of Yemen. • Osama bin Laden was killed during Operation Neptune Spear in Abbottabad, Pakistan, on May 2, 2011.
James J. Bulger	#458	1999	• Captured • Bulger was wanted for his role in 18 murders committed from the early 1970s through the mid-1980s in connection with his leadership of an organized crime group that allegedly controlled extortion, drug deals, and other illegal activities in the Boston, Massachusetts area. • He was arrested June 22, 2011, in Santa Monica, California.

The modern header with blue border used by the FBI on top Ten Fugitive wanted posters since at least 2002, on both the FBI internet web site and in public presentations of the wanted posters.

== FBI Ten Most Wanted Fugitives added during the 2000s ==
The list of the most wanted fugitives listed during the 2000s fluctuated throughout the decade. As before, spots on the list were occupied by fugitives who had been listed in prior years, and still remained at large. The list includes (in FBI list appearance sequence order):

=== 2000 ===
Name	Sequence Number	Date of Entry	Time Listed
Jesse James Caston	#459	August 19, 2000	Four months
Jesse James Caston was wanted for the shooting death of two distant relatives, a father and son, on a Mississippi River levee. A federal arrest warrant was issued in United States District Court for the Western District of Louisiana, on April 14, 2000, and charged him with Unlawful Flight to Avoid Prosecution. Caston hitchhiked a ride in a blue van and was last seen at a truck stop in Longview, Texas, on April 13, 2000. He was then wanted for kidnapping and forcing a man to drive them both to Marshall, Texas, where the vehicle broke down on April 13, 2000. A state warrant was issued on April 12, 2000, in the Parish of East Carroll, Louisiana with charges of two counts of first degree murder and two counts of attempted first degree murder; attempted murder and ambush of two police officers in Lake Providence, Louisiana – wounding one by three shotgun blasts. Caston was wanted for murder of his wife and her female friend Sharon McIntyre, in their homes April 10, 2000. Caston was featured on the America's Most Wanted television program on August 19, 2000. He was spotted at a gas station at the corner of Brookhurst and Hazard in Westminster, California driving a 1980s model pickup truck that was pulling a cement pumper in July, 2000. He surrendered to authorities after a standoff at Lake Providence, Louisiana December 20, 2000.
Eric Franklin Rosser	#460	December 27, 2000	Eight months
Eric Franklin Rosser was wanted for his involvement in a number of child pornography offenses, including a videotape, that he recorded in Thailand, and was distributed to a Bloomington, Indiana resident. He was arrested at a business in Bangkok, Thailand on August 21, 2001, for child pornography.

=== 2001 ===
Name	Sequence Number	Date of Entry	Time Listed
Aurlieas Dame McClarty	#461	February 5, 2001	Nine days
Aurlieas Dame McClarty was wanted for bank robbery of the Citizens National Bank in Laurel, Maryland on October 4, 2000. He was wanted on local charges for double homicide, both victims shot in the head, of two employees of a truck rental dealership in Orlando, Florida on July 18, 2000, during an armed robbery which netted only $200. McClarty was also wanted by Indiana state authorities for criminal deception and by the United States Secret Service, in Orlando, Florida for counterfeiting. He was captured without incident at a residence in Irmo, South Carolina on February 14, 2001. He was located one day before the February 15, 2001 formal announcement placing him on the Top Ten list, effective as of February 5, 2001.
Hopeton Eric Brown	#462	March 17, 2001	Three years
Hopeton Eric Brown was wanted for murder and attempted murder at an apartment in Saint Paul, Minnesota on March 21, 1997, where he and drug associates severely beat and shot a man to death in a drug dispute, and then shot the victim's female friend several times, including once in the head. He was indicted March 25, 1999 along with Mosiah Omar Wright by a Federal grand jury in the United States District Court for the District of Minnesota, at Minneapolis, Minnesota for the drug related crimes. Additionally, he was arrested in London, England in June 2000, for possession of crack cocaine, using the alias name Simon Plested, and was later released; believed by Jamaican authorities to have been in a gang of four other armed men who shot and killed a man and shot and wounded two other men in Barrett Town; was wanted for two murders in Jamaica in January 2001, the second having been killed while in his home, allegedly by a stray bullet fired by Brown; alleged to have killed one individual for leaning on his car on January 14, 2001, in Montego Bay. On March 21, 2004, Brown was killed during a gunfight with Jamaican law enforcement authorities in Barrett Town, Montego Bay, Jamaica.
Maghfoor Mansoor	#463	May 25, 2001	Captured 12 days before official list publication
Maghfoor Mansoor was charged by the Las Vegas Justice Court December 15, 2000 with sexual assault with a deadly weapon and first degree kidnapping with a deadly weapon in a case centering on a 17-year-old female victim in Las Vegas, Nevada. He had been previously convicted of sexually abusing a 14-year-old girl in Las Vegas. The Las Vegas Metropolitan Police Department requested the assistance of the FBI and obtained an Unlawful Flight warrant January 2, 2001. Mansoor headed east from Las Vegas and while a fugitive he assaulted a law enforcement officer and committed an armed carjacking in New Orleans, Louisiana which led to the death of a state highway worker whom he struck with the vehicle while fleeing. He then headed northeast from New Orleans and committed an armed carjacking, and numerous armed robberies/burglaries inside several casino/hotel rooms while in Atlantic City, New Jersey, to include holding a retired New Jersey State Trooper and his wife at gunpoint during a foiled room robbery attempt. Additionally he committed an armed robbery of a jewelry store located inside the Trump Taj Mahal. He fled Atlantic City by carjacking a cab at gunpoint, forced the cab driver to take him to New York City and then robbed him before exiting the cab. On May 11, 2001, he was located in New York City and was fatally shot by a New York City Division HIDTA Fugitive Task Force member that same day in a gunfight inside the hotel lobby of the Hampshire Hotel on 4th Street in New York City.
Francis William Murphy	#464	June 6, 2001	Captured 17 days before official list publication
Francis William Murphy was arrested without incident in the attic of the house in which he was hiding in Buffalo, New York. He was arrested before his addition to the Top Ten list was announced to the public. He was wanted for killing four people in the span of three days in Buffalo, NY.
Dwight Bowen	#465	August 30, 2001	Captured 8 days before official list publication
Dwight Bowen was wanted for the Molotov cocktail firebombing murders of two toddlers in a North Philadelphia, Pennsylvania home in early June 2001. He was arrested in Richmond, Virginia on August 22, 2001.
Nikolay Soltys	#466	August 23, 2001	One week
Nikolay Soltys was wanted for the stabbing and death of his 23-year-old pregnant wife in their North Highlands, California, home on August 20, 2001. He then drove to the home of his aunt and uncle where he killed the couple and his two young cousins. He then drove to his mother's house and picked up his 3-year-old son. Later that night the car was found in the vicinity of his mother's house, and a search of the vehicle found a note with information on location of Soltys' son. A state arrest warrant for murder was issued on August 20, 2001, by the Sacramento County Superior Court in Sacramento, California. His son's body was found in an empty field in Roseville, California on August 21, 2001. He was arrested in the backyard of a family member's home without incident in Citrus Heights, California on August 30, 2001. Soltys later committed suicide in Sacramento County Jail on February 13, 2002.
Clayton Waagner	#467	September 21, 2001	Three months
Clayton Lee Waagner had been convicted on charges of possession of a firearm by a felon and interstate transportation of a stolen motor vehicle; had been arrested after crossing into Illinois with his wife and eight children in a stolen Winnebago RV in September 1999. He escaped from DeWitt County Jail in Clinton, Illinois on February 22, 2001, where he was awaiting sentencing and facing a term of 15 years to life. He then became wanted for the bank robbery of a First Union Bank in Harrisburg, Pennsylvania May 2001 and for carjackings in Tunica and in Robinsonville, Mississippi and firearms violations in Memphis, Tennessee September 7, 2001. Waagner became a U.S. Marshals Service Top 15 Fugitive on November 29, 2001, because of more than 280 letters that threatened to contain anthrax, which he mailed with return addresses of the U.S. Marshals Service and the U.S. Secret Service in October 2001. He then mailed anthrax letters to Planned Parenthood November 2001 and issued threats to kill 42 low-level abortion clinic employees up to November 23, 2001. Waagner was arrested at a Kinko's in Springdale, Ohio on December 5, 2001.
Felix Summers	#468	October 30, 2001	45 days
Felix Summers was wanted in the murder of a witness against Summers in Philadelphia in 1999 in a pending homicide case as well as being wanted in the murder of a 16-year-old girl and the wounding of five others in Philadelphia in August 2001. Summers had also been the lead suspect in several murders in the South Philadelphia area, where he was dealing drugs. He evaded police who followed up on a tip August 22, 2001 that he was at the Dickinson Street South Philadelphia apartment of Jarrell Jones, which contained cocaine, handguns, and currency. Summer was captured in Blackwood, New Jersey December 14, 2001.

=== 2002 ===
Name	Sequence Number	Date of Entry	Time Listed
Christian Longo	#469	January 11, 2002	Two days
Christian Michael Longo became wanted in the murder of his wife and children in Oregon after the body of his 4-year-old son was found on December 19, 2001, floating several feet from shore in the Lint Slough, a waterway off the Pacific Ocean, in Waldport, Oregon. Divers searching the same area where his son's body had been earlier found also located the body of his 3-year-old sister on December 22, 2001. The bodies of the children's mother and 2-year-old sister were found five days later. After leaving the United States, Longo had been recognized in Cancún on December 27, 2001, at a hostel. The next day he was charged December 28, 2001 in Lincoln County, Oregon with multiple counts of aggravated murder in the death of his family; and with unlawful flight by a federal arrest warrant issued in the United States District Court for the District of Oregon. After leaving the hostel on January 7, 2002, he was captured six days later without incident in the small town of Tulum, Quintana Roo, about 60 miles south of Cancún. He was taken into U.S. custody at the Houston, Texas airport January 14, 2002.
Michael Scott Bliss	#470	January 31, 2002	Three months
Michael Scott Bliss was a prior convicted felon who in July 2000 had finished serving time in prison for videotaped aggravated assaults on three minors in Vermont, New Hampshire, and Massachusetts. He was wanted for repeat videotaped molestations of a 9-year-old girl that began in September 2000 and ended in April 2001 as well as for aggravated sexual assault in New Hampshire. An arrest warrant was issued in Vermont on April 9, 2001, for his arrest. On June 6, 2001, his vehicle was found abandoned at LAX airport. Bliss was captured at the Nutel Motel in the Westlake area of Los Angeles, California at 5:30 p.m. on the night of April 23, 2002.
James Spencer Springette	#471	April 25, 2002	Seven months
James Spencer Springette was the head of Caribbean-based drug cartel since 1991. He was charged with conspiracy in United States District Court for the Southern District of Georgia in October 1998 for conspiracy to import cocaine hydrochloride and cocaine base, conspiracy to distribute cocaine, and conspiracy to launder monetary instruments. Springette was originally arrested in Medellín, Colombia, January 30, 1999, but escaped from La Picota prison in Bogotá, Colombia on March 1, 2000, while waiting extradition. He was captured near Caracas, Venezuela on November 5, 2002.
Rubén Hernández Martínez	#472	May 1, 2002	Two days
Rubén Hernández Martínez was wanted for home invasions and sexual assaults in Nashville, Tennessee in 1997 and 1998, while working as a construction laborer as a resident alien with a valid green card and social security card. Hernández was charged on May 29, 1998, by the Metropolitan Nashville Police Department, Davidson County, Tennessee, with five counts of aggravated rape, one count of aggravated burglary, and one count of failure to appear. He was arrested without incident in Rio Bravo, Mexico, by Mexican law enforcement authorities.
Timmy John Weber	#473	May 7, 2002	Captured 9 days before official list publication
Timmy John Weber murdered his girlfriend, Kim Gautier, and her teenage son, Anthony; he also sexually assaulted Gautier's daughter, attacked another of Gautier's teenage sons with a baseball bat, and was involved in producing child pornography. He was sentenced to death in 2003 but died of natural causes on May 18, 2022, at Sunrise Hospital in Las Vegas, Nevada. He was captured nine days before announcement.
Richard Goldberg	#474	June 14, 2002	Five years
Richard Goldberg was wanted for allegedly engaging in sexual activities with several female children under the age of ten in Long Beach, California, from January through May 2001. He was charged in California in July 2001, in a state arrest warrant with six counts of lewd acts upon a child and two counts of possession of child pornography. Goldberg was subsequently charged as a fugitive in a federal arrest warrant issued by the United States District Court for the Central District of California. Goldberg was arrested in Montreal, Canada, at his residence by the Montreal Police and the Royal Canadian Mounted Police on May 12, 2007. He was later sentenced to twenty years in prison.
Robert William Fisher	#475	June 29, 2002	Still at large but removed from the list
Robert William Fisher is wanted for murder of his wife and their two children in Scottsdale, Arizona on April 10, 2001. He has been charged with three counts of first degree murder and one count of arson of an occupied structure. He was removed from the list on November 3, 2021, for no longer meeting the list criteria.

=== 2003 ===
Name	Sequence Number	Date of Entry	Time Listed
Michael Alfonso	#476	January 23, 2003	One year
Michael Alfonso was wanted for the murder of two women. The first account was for stalking and shooting to death an earlier girlfriend, 23-year-old Sumanear Yang, in Illinois, in September 1992. The second was for the stalking and shooting to death of his 28-year-old ex-girlfriend, Genoveva Velasquez, June 6, 2001, as she arrived for work at a restaurant in Wheaton, Illinois. He was arrested in Veracruz, Mexico on July 16, 2004, and brought back to the United States after being reported to the U.S. embassy when a viewer recognized him after being profiled on America's Most Wanted.
Genero Espinosa Dorantes	#477	August 14, 2003	Three years
Genero Espinosa Dorantes was wanted for participation in burning, beating, torture and murder of his 4-year-old stepson in Nashville, Tennessee in February, 2003. He was arrested in Tijuana, Mexico, on February 25, 2006.

=== 2004 ===
Name	Sequence Number	Date of Entry	Time Listed
Diego León Montoya Sánchez	#478	May 6, 2004	Three years
Diego León Montoya Sánchez was sought in connection with the manufacturing and distribution of multiple tons of cocaine, knowing or intending that it will be imported into the United States. Montoya was reputedly one of the principal leaders of the Colombian North Valley Drug Cartel. The North Valley Cartel was believed to be the most powerful and violent drug trafficking organization in Colombia. The cartel reportedly relied heavily for protection on illegal armed groups, taking help from right-wing paramilitaries as well as leftist rebels. He was arrested in Colombia on September 10, 2007, and is in Colombian custody.
Chaunson Lavel McKibbins	#479	November 9, 2004	Captured 11 days before official list publication
Chaunson Lavel McKibbins was wanted for kidnapping, aggravated assault, and murder in Atlanta, GA. He was captured on October 29, 2004, at a gas station in Atlanta after receiving a tip from a viewer of the America’s Most Wanted television program.

=== 2005 ===
Name	Sequence Number	Date of Entry	Time Listed
Jorge Alberto López Orozco	#480	March 17, 2005	Four years
Jorge López Orozco was wanted in connection with the murders of a woman and her two young children, ages 2 and 4, in Elmore County, Idaho. The victims' remains were found on August 11, 2002, inside a burned-out vehicle. He was believed to be travelling with his brother, Simón López Orozco, who has been charged as an accessory in the crime. On October 8, 2009, the Procuraduría General de la República arrested López Orozco in Mexico.

=== 2006 ===
Name	Sequence Number	Date of Entry	Time Listed
Michael Paul Astorga	#481	April 1, 2006	Two days
Michael Paul Astorga was wanted for the November 5, 2005, shooting death of Candido Martinez, 27, in Albuquerque, New Mexico and the murder of Bernalillo County Sheriff's Deputy James Frances McGrane Jr. on March 22, 2006, during a routine traffic stop just south of Tijeras, New Mexico. He was profiled on the television show America's Most Wanted: America Fights Back on April 1, 2006. Astorga was captured by the Agencia Estatal De Investigaciones del Estado de Chihuahua on April 3, 2006, in Ciudad Juárez, Chihuahua, Mexico, where he had hid out, just across the border from El Paso, Texas. He was a Mexico prisoner charged with possession of firearms, ammunition, and marijuana but came into U.S. custody after Bernalillo County Sheriff's Officers posted $2,000 bond to Mexican authorities.
Warren Steed Jeffs	#482	May 6, 2006	Four months
Warren Steed Jeffs was accused of arranging marriages between underage girls and older men. Federal authorities also have added a charge of unlawful flight to avoid prosecution. Jeffs was a church elder within the Fundamentalist Church of Jesus Christ of Latter Day Saints. He was captured on August 29, 2006, on Interstate 15 just north of Las Vegas, Nevada, after a routine traffic stop.
Ralph "Bucky" Phillips	#483	September 7, 2006	One day
Ralph "Bucky" Phillips was wanted for escaping from the Erie County Correctional Facility in Alden, New York, on April 2, 2006. He was also wanted for the June 10, 2006, shooting of a New York State Trooper that occurred in Chemung County, New York as well as for questioning in the shooting death of one New York State Trooper and the wounding of another on August 31, 2006, in Chautauqua County, New York. He was captured on September 8, 2006, after surrendering to authorities after being cornered in a corn field just over the Pennsylvania state line.
John W. Parsons	#484	September 30, 2006	Twenty days
John W. Parsons was wanted for escaping from the Ross County Jail in Ohio on July 29, 2006. Parsons was being held without bond at the jail, pending trial for several indictments, including aggravated murder for the slaying of a Chillicothe police officer on April 21, 2005, aggravated robbery, having weapons under disability, tampering with evidence, and two counts of grand theft. He escaped by forming a rope using toilet paper and torn up bed sheets. Parsons was captured on October 19, 2006, after surrendering to police in eastern Chillicothe.

=== 2007 ===
Name	Sequence Number	Date of Entry	Time Listed
Emigdio Preciado Jr.	#485	March 14, 2007	Two years
Emigdio Preciado Jr. was wanted for opening fire on two police officers in Los Angeles, California on September 5, 2000, seriously injuring one of them. He was believed to be heading to a gang-related drive-by shooting at the time. He was captured in Mexico on July 17, 2009.
Shauntay Henderson	#486	March 31, 2007	One day
Shauntay Henderson was wanted for the execution-style murder of a man in Kansas City, Missouri in September 2006. She was captured April 1, 2007, after being briefly profiled on America's Most Wanted on the evening of her public listing. She was believed to be the head member of the violent 12th Street Gang, in Kansas City, Missouri.
Alexis Flores	#487	June 2, 2007	Removed from the list but later captured
Alexis Flores was wanted for the kidnapping and murder of 5-year-old Iriana DeJesus in Philadelphia, Pennsylvania, in July 2000. DNA linked him to the crime several years later. He was removed from the list on March 6, 2025, for no longer meeting the list criteria. He was captured in Lepaera, Honduras, on February 11, 2026.
Jon Savarino Schillaci	#488	September 7, 2007	Nine months
Jon Savarino Schillaci was wanted for the alleged molestation of a young boy in Deerfield, New Hampshire, in October 1999. Schillaci had been communicating with the victim's family while he was serving time for prior sexual assault convictions. After his release from prison, the family provided Schillaci a home from which to start his new life, during which time the molestation occurred. On June 5, 2008, Schillaci was taken into custody in Aguascalientes state in Mexico without incident. He was returned to New Hampshire to face child molestation and child pornography charges on June 6, 2008.
Jason Derek Brown	#489	December 8, 2007	Still at large but removed from the list
Jason Derek Brown is wanted for the murder of an armored car guard in Phoenix, Arizona, in November 2004. He allegedly spent the weeks leading up to the murder in a parking lot, studying the schedules of when the guards began collecting the money. He was removed from the list on September 7, 2022, for no longer meeting the list criteria.

=== 2008 ===
Name	Sequence Number	Date of Entry	Time Listed
Michael Jason Registe	#490	July 26, 2008	One month
Michael Jason Registe was wanted for his alleged participation in a double homicide in Columbus, Georgia. On July 20, 2007, law enforcement officials responded to a shooting incident in which two males sitting inside a truck had suffered execution-style gunshot wounds to the back of their heads. One of the victims died at the scene and the other died shortly afterward. On August 27, 2008, Registe was captured on the Island of St. Martin following numerous tips being received by the FBI after the airing of an America's Most Wanted television segment featuring Registe. Officials speculated that extradition would have taken from two weeks to several months. Eleven months later, Registe was extradited.
Edward Eugene Harper	#491	November 29, 2008	Eight months
Edward Eugene Harper was wanted for his alleged involvement in sexual behavior with two girls, ages 3 and 8, in Mississippi. The girls lived near Harper and reportedly visited him at his home. Harper was charged with sex crimes and arrested. Harper was released on bond, but he failed to appear for a court hearing in 1994, and his bond was revoked. He was captured in Washakie County, Wyoming in the southern portion of the Big Horn Mountains on July 23, 2009, by FBI and Wyoming Game and Fish Department officers.

=== 2009 ===
Name	Sequence Number	Date of Entry	Time Listed
Joe Luis Saenz	#492	October 19, 2009	Three years
Joe Luis Saenz was wanted for murder, kidnapping, rape, parole violation and unlawful flight to avoid prosecution. According to the FBI, in 1998, Joe Luis Saenz allegedly shot and killed two rival gang members in Los Angeles for disrespecting one of the members of his gang. Saenz then kidnapped, raped, and murdered his ex-girlfriend and mother of his child, at his grandmother's home. It is also believed that, in October 2008, he was involved in the murder of a member of his own Lott Stoner gang. Saenz was captured in Mexico in November 2012.
Eduardo Ravelo	#493	October 21, 2009	Nine years
Eduardo Ravelo was indicted in Texas in 2008 for his involvement in racketeering activities, conspiracy to launder monetary instruments, and conspiracy to possess heroin, cocaine and marijuana with the intent to distribute. His alleged criminal activities began in 2003. He was captured on June 26, 2018.
Semion Mogilevich	#494	October 22, 2009	Still at large but removed from the list
Semion Mogilevich is wanted for his alleged participation in a multimillion-dollar scheme to defraud thousands of investors in the stock of a public company incorporated in Canada, but headquartered in Newtown, Pennsylvania, between 1993 and 1998. The scheme to defraud collapsed in 1998, after thousands of investors lost in excess of $150 million, and Mogilevich, thought to have allegedly funded and authorized the scheme, was indicted in April 2003. He was removed from the list on December 17, 2015, for no longer meeting list criteria.

== End of the decade ==
As the decade closed, the following were still at large as the Ten Most Wanted Fugitives:

Name	Sequence number	Date of entry
Victor Manuel Gerena	#386	May 14, 1984
Glen Stewart Godwin	#447	Dec 7, 1996
Osama bin Laden	#456	Jun 7, 1999
James J. Bulger	#458	Aug 19, 1999
Robert William Fisher	#475	Jun 29, 2002
Alexis Flores	#487	Jun 2, 2007
Jason Derek Brown	#489	Dec 8, 2007
Joe Luis Saenz	#492	Oct 19, 2009
Eduardo Ravelo	#493	Oct 20, 2009
Semion Mogilevich	#494	Oct 22, 2009

== FBI directors in the 2000s ==
- Louis J. Freeh (1993–2001)
- Thomas J. Pickard (2001)
- Robert Mueller (2001–2013)
