= Michael Registe =

American criminal (born 1982)

Michael Jason Registe
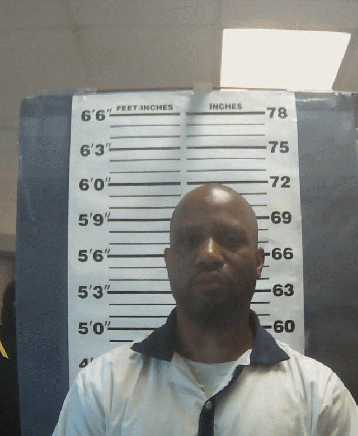
- Mugshot

FBI Ten Most Wanted Fugitive
- Charges: Unlawful flight to avoid prosecution, murder

Description
- Born: February 26, 1982 (age 44); Fort Benning, Georgia, U.S.
- Nationality: American

Status
- Convictions: Murder (2 counts)
- Penalty: Life imprisonment (minimum of 30 years)
- Added: July 26, 2008
- Caught: August 27, 2008
- Number: 490
- Captured

Michael Jason Registe (born February 26, 1982) is an American criminal who was a fugitive wanted for his alleged participation in a 2007 execution-style double murder. FBI director Robert Mueller announced Registe's addition to the FBI Ten Most Wanted Fugitives list on the July 26 edition of America's Most Wanted. He was captured on August 27, 2008, in the Caribbean island of St. Maarten.

== Early life ==
Registe was born in Fort Benning, Georgia. He attended Spencer High School, where he was an athlete in track and field. He was voted to the All Bi-City team for his achievements in track. However, his athletic career ended due to his criminal activity. Registe earned his General Educational Development in prison.

== Criminal record ==
Between 2000 and 2002, Registe was convicted of possession of marijuana, possession of burglary tools, and motor vehicle theft. He served three months in jail in 2001 and ten months from August 2002 to June 2003 in Wayne State Prison.

== Criminal charges ==
=== 2005 assault ===
Additionally, Registe was wanted by the Columbus Police Department on an unrelated charge of aggravated assault for a shooting in which the victim was severely wounded. On November 13, 2005, Columbus Police responded to a scene in which shots were reportedly fired at an apartment complex. After investigating the scene, police determined that Registe shot a man who was allegedly trying to buy drugs from him, striking the man in his head, his left hand, and his left leg. Registe was charged with aggravated assault, but fled on foot before he could be apprehended.

After that shooting, he was believed to have fled to St. Thomas, U.S. Virgin Islands and he returned to Georgia in May 2007. Registe has had no known source of legitimate income, so he may have been engaged in illegal activities such as selling drugs to support himself.

=== 2007 double murder ===
On July 20, 2007, police officers in Columbus, Georgia arrived to a gruesome crime scene in which two Columbus State University student athletes, Bryan Kilgore and Randy Andra Newton, Jr., were killed while sitting in a Chevrolet Blazer. They had been shot execution-style. Randy Newton was pronounced dead at the scene, while Bryan Kilgore died shortly afterward while being transported to Columbus Regional Hospital.

An investigation into the murders pointed to Registe, and arrest warrants were obtained charging him with allegedly committing the crimes. It is suspected that he fled Columbus the day after the murders and flew once again to Saint Thomas, Virgin Islands, using the pseudonym "Hakeem Penn." On July 23, 2007, a federal warrant was issued charging Registe with unlawful flight to avoid prosecution.

On July 26, 2008, he was named by the FBI as the 490th fugitive to be placed on the FBI Ten Most Wanted Fugitives. He replaced Jon Schillaci on the list. There was a reward of up to $100,000 for information leading to his capture being offered by the FBI.

== Capture and extradition ==
After Registe had been profiled on America's Most Wanted, authorities received numerous tips from the general public concerning Registe's whereabouts.

On August 27, 2008, Registe was arrested without incident on the island of St. Maarten by St. Maarten Police officials in conjunction with the Antilles Director of Public Prosecution and through coordination with the FBI's Bridgetown Legal Attaché. Officials have speculated his extradition to the United States may take from two weeks to several months. Muscogee County district attorney Gray Conger told the news reporters that Registe will not face the death penalty once he is extradited to Columbus.

The first extradition hearing for Registe's case was postponed until December 11, 2008, at his lawyer's request. Registe's lawyer in the extradition case, Remco Stomp, made a plea to the court for witnesses to be questioned in the case to determine the validity of the charges against his client.

Registe's lawyer requested on November 20, 2008, that the judges of the Netherlands Antilles and Aruba postpone the extradition hearing because he had not had sufficient time to study the extradition documents filed by the United States’ judicial authorities to discuss them with his client. Registe's lawyer requested for his client to remain in St. Maarten due to doubts about his likelihood of getting a fair trial in the United States:

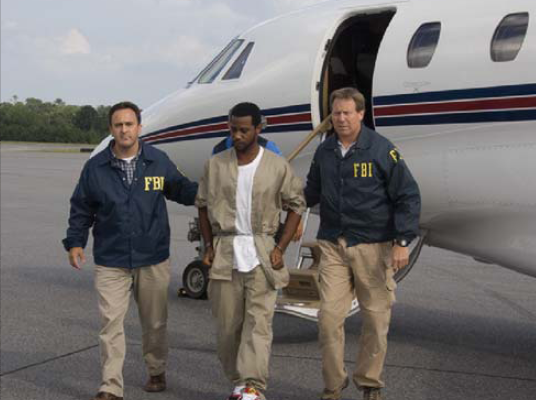
Registe being escorted by FBI agents after his extradition in July 2009.

"My client has been the victim of frenzy in the United States. The media have described the alleged facts as an ‘execution-style murder’ and my client has been mentioned in one breath with serial killers and with Osama bin Laden. If my client would have to stand trial under such circumstances before a jury in a predominantly white state, then I have my serious doubts about the outcome."

On Dec 23, 2008, the high court of the Netherlands Antilles recommended Michael Registe be extradited to the U.S.; however, Registe's attorney filed an appeal to the High Council, stating the high court's "advice was based on an antiquated and questionable theory." St. Maarten's governor will make the final decision about whether to extradite Registe but is delaying his decision until the High Council makes its ruling. Registe was in the Pointe Blanche House of Detention, where he had been held since his August 27 arrest at a local guesthouse.

On July 23, 2009, after numerous appeals, Registe returned to the United States, arriving at the Columbus Airport, escorted by FBI agents. He was incarcerated at the Muscogee County jail. As a condition of his extradition, the authorities will not seek capital punishment in the case.

In May 2013, Registe pleaded guilty to two counts of murder for killing Bryan Kilgore and Randy Newton Jr. He was sentenced to two concurrent life terms with the possibility of parole. Registe is serving his sentence at Coffee Correctional Facility in Nicholls, Georgia, and will become eligible for parole in 2038.
