= Shelley Shannon =

American anti-abortion activist (born 1956)

- Born: Rachelle Ranae Pauli; March 31, 1956 (age 70); Grants Pass, Oregon
- Spouse: David Shannon (m. 1974)
- Children: 2
- Status: Released (November 2018)
- Convictions: Attempted murder, arson, interference with commerce by force, interstate travel in aid of racketeering
- Penalty: 23 years in prison

Details
- Country: United States
- Targets: Abortion providers and clinics in Oregon, California, Nevada, and Kansas
- Injured: George Tiller (shot)
- Weapons: Handgun, fire bombing
- Imprisoned at: Waseca FCI (1995–2018)

Rachelle Ranae "Shelley" Shannon (born March 31, 1956) is an American anti-abortion activist who was convicted in a Kansas state court for the attempted murder of George Tiller by shooting him in his car in Wichita, Kansas in 1993. She was also convicted in U.S. federal court for ten attacks at abortion clinics using arson or acid. At her sentencing in U.S. District Court in 1995, the presiding judge described Shannon as a terrorist and agreed with prosecutors that she was a threat even from behind bars. She served her sentence at the Federal Correctional Institution in Waseca, Minnesota and was released in November 2018.

== Involvement in anti-abortion movement ==
Shannon became involved in the anti-abortion movement around 1988. She was arrested several times for trespassing and physically obstructing access to clinics.

After the murder of an abortion provider in Pensacola in 1993, Shannon wrote at least 25 letters to the perpetrator, calling him a "hero" and "brave soldier" and describing her disillusionment with nonviolence. She traveled to Kentucky to visit John Brockhoeft, convicted of firebombing a Cincinnati abortion clinic.

== Attempted murder of George Tiller ==
On August 19, 1993, Shelley Shannon shot physician George Tiller in both arms, while he was in his car outside his Wichita, Kansas abortion clinic.

Shannon was a resident of Grants Pass, Oregon, and had been a part of the anti-abortion movement for at least five years at the time she shot Tiller. She had written in support of Michael Griffin, the murderer of David Gunn, calling Griffin "the awesomest, greatest hero of our time." Tiller's Wichita clinic was the site of frequent demonstrations and incidents of direct action by those opposed to abortion and of counter-demonstrations by abortion rights activists. Under cover of such a fracas, Shannon shot Tiller with a semiautomatic pistol.

Tiller was assassinated on May 31, 2009, by Scott Roeder.

== Trial and imprisonment ==
At her trial in state court, Shannon testified that there was nothing immoral about trying to kill Tiller. The jurors needed only an hour to convict her of attempted murder. She was sentenced to 11 years in prison.

While incarcerated in Lansing, Kansas, Shannon signed the Army of God's statement in support of the actions of Paul Jennings Hill, identifying herself as a "prisoner of Christ".

On June 4, 1995, she pleaded guilty to setting fires at several abortion clinics in Oregon, California and Nevada. She had been indicted by federal grand juries on 30 counts in connection with fires and butyric acid attacks at nine clinics. Charges included arson, interference with commerce by force and interstate travel in aid of racketeering. On September 9, 1995, U.S. Federal District Court Judge James A. Redden sentenced Shannon to 20 years in prison—a substantial upward departure from sentencing guidelines. In sentencing her, Redden called her a terrorist. He sided with prosecutors who contended that Shannon was a threat even from behind bars. The federal sentence was set to begin only after the completion of Shannon's 11-year state incarceration for shooting Tiller.

Her daughter, Angela Shannon, was prosecuted for sending a death threat in 1993 to George Woodward, a Milwaukee doctor who performed abortions. (The letter arrived on March 3, 1993 — a week before the murder of David Gunn.) The elder Shannon attempted to take the blame for the death threat, but in view of Angela's fingerprints having been found on the letter, Angela was convicted and sentenced to 46 months' incarceration in 1997. Her sentence was finished in 2001.

In 1998, Shannon filed a lawsuit contending that the sewage system in the Kansas prison was inadequate, and that sewage backups created unhealthful conditions for the inmates. Her lawsuit was dismissed by Federal District Court Judge Kathryn Vratil in Kansas City, Kansas. The dismissal was upheld by a 2–1 vote of the 10th U.S. Circuit Court of Appeals, stating there wasn't sufficient proof the warden knew about the sewer problems. Before Shannon's attorney could refile, the sewer system and other problems were corrected.

Shannon had been in ongoing contact with controversial anti-abortionist Donald Spitz during her incarceration at Waseca federal prison as well as at the time of her release.

== See also ==
- Anti-abortion violence
