= Alexis Flores =

Honduran former fugitive and criminal (born 1975)

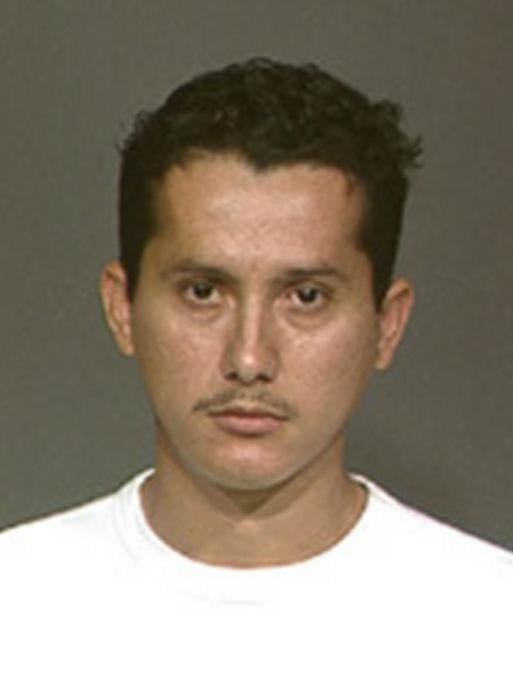
- Flores in 2002

FBI Ten Most Wanted Fugitive
- Charges: Murder; Kidnapping; Unlawful Flight to Avoid Prosecution
- Reward: $250,000
- Alias: Carlos Flores; Mario Flores; Mario Roberto Flores; Mario F. Roberto; Alex Contreras; Alesis Contreras; Carlos Contreras

Description
- Born: Mario Roberto Flores Mejía; July 18, 1975 (age 51); Choloma, Cortés Department, Honduras
- Nationality: Honduran
- Gender: Male
- Height: 5 ft 4 in (163 cm)
- Weight: around 140 lb (64 kg; 10 st)
- Occupation: Handyman

Status
- Added: June 2, 2007
- Caught: February 11, 2026
- Number: 487
- Captured

Mario Roberto Flores Mejía (born July 18, 1975) better known by the alias Alexis Flores, is a Honduran former fugitive who was wanted for the kidnapping, rape, and murder of five-year-old Iriana DeJesus in Philadelphia in 2000. Flores was the 487th fugitive to be placed on the FBI's Ten Most Wanted Fugitives list. On March 6, 2025, he was removed from the list for no longer meeting the list criteria. On February 11, 2026, Flores was captured in Lepaera, Honduras, after more than 25 years on the run.

== Background ==
Mario Roberto Flores Mejía was born in Choloma, Cortés Department, Honduras. Although several dates of birth ranging from 1975 to 1982 have been used, Honduran authorities later confirmed his actual date of birth as July 18, 1975.

Not much is known about Flores' life before entering the United States, except that he has two scars on his forehead and left cheek, as well as a large surgical scar on his neck, which he says is the result of an injury sustained during Hurricane Mitch in Honduras in 1998.

== Kidnapping and murder charges ==
Flores had lived in the United States as a migrant worker, traveling around the country by train hopping. In 2000, he boarded a train he believed was headed for Chicago, but instead ended up in Philadelphia.

In the summer of 2000, a homeless drifter only known as "Carlos" (or "Carlo") had been given shelter, clothing, and work as a handyman by Jorge Contreras, a resident of Hunting Park. As part of his job, "Carlos" was given the keys to an abandoned apartment building. On July 29, 2000, five-year-old Iriana DeJesus disappeared while playing on the street outside her home in Fairhill, having last been seen walking from the neighborhood with a stranger. On August 3, six days after being reported missing, the body of DeJesus was found in the second-floor apartment of an abandoned building where "Carlos" is believed to have stayed. She had been sexually assaulted, strangled, and wrapped in a trash bag. A T-shirt bearing a distinct political logo was found near Iriana's body with her blood on it. When police questioned Contreras about the shirt, he recognized it as one of the articles of clothing he had lent to "Carlos," who had not been seen in the area since the girl was reported missing. An arrest warrant was issued for "Carlos Doe" and a sketch of him was profiled on America's Most Wanted.

== Arrests and deportation ==
Flores was arrested for shoplifting in Arizona in 2002. In November 2004, Flores was charged with felony forgery, after he provided police with fraudulent identity documents while being questioned for a noise complaint at his residence in Phoenix. As part of his arrest, he was required to submit a DNA sample. He was imprisoned in Arizona, released the same year and deported in June 2005.

== DNA match and addition to FBI Ten Most Wanted Fugitives ==
In 2006, Flores' DNA sample taken in Arizona was added to the Combined DNA Index System. On March 22, 2007, his DNA sample positively matched DNA found at the crime scene in Philadelphia. It was determined that "Carlos" and Flores are the same person.

On March 22, 2007, a local arrest warrant was issued in the Commonwealth of Pennsylvania, and Flores was charged with murder and various other felonies. On the same date, a federal arrest warrant for Flores was issued in the Eastern District of Pennsylvania, and he was charged with unlawful flight to avoid prosecution.

Flores was added to the FBI's Top Ten Most Wanted Fugitives list on June 2, 2007. He replaced Shauntay Henderson on the list. The FBI had offered a reward of up to $250,000 for information leading directly to Flores' capture. He was also the subject of an Interpol Red Notice. He was considered armed and extremely dangerous, members of the public were discouraged to apprehend or approach him themselves and were instead directed to submit any leads to their local FBI office, the FBI's website, or nearest American Embassy or consulate. Flores is fluent in Spanish and English, and was believed to be either in Honduras or to have returned to the United States.

In March 2024, the FBI released a new age-progression image of Flores, showing what he may have looked like at that point in time. On March 6, 2025, Flores was removed from the FBI Ten Most Wanted Fugitives list for no longer meeting the list criteria. He was replaced by Ryan Wedding. Despite being removed from the list, the FBI announced that he would remain on the Most Wanted page of their website.

== Capture ==
On February 11, 2026, Alexis Flores was captured by the Technical Agency for Criminal Investigation (ATIC) in a remote, mountainous area of Lepaera, Lempira Department, Honduras. Later, FBI Director Kash Patel confirmed the capture in a public statement. According to Patel, the arrest was undertaken by the FBI’s Transnational Anti-Gang Task Force in collaboration with Honduran investigators.

A judge of the Supreme Court of Justice (CSJ) ordered his provisional detention. He was initially held at the Támara National Penitentiary in Francisco Morazán Department, pending extradition to the United States. He was later extradited to the United States and is currently in U.S. custody.
