= The Unborn =

The Unborn may refer to:

== Biology ==
- Unborn, any stage of prenatal development from fertilization to birth

== Spirituality ==
- Wu Sheng Lao Mu, the creator of the universe according to the Way of Former Heaven doctrine
- Anutpada, the Buddhist doctrine of the absence of an origin
- Bankei and his notion of 'the Unborn"

== In entertainment ==
- The Unborn, the UK title for Tomorrow's Children, a 1934 American film directed by Crane Wilbur
- The Unborn (1991 film), starring Brooke Adams
- The Unborn (2003 film), written and directed by Bhandit Thongdee
- Gauri: The Unborn, a 2007 Indian film
- The Unborn (2009 film), written and directed by David S. Goyer
- The Unborn (album), by Mors Principium Est
- Unborn (album), by Six Feet Under
- Unborn, a plot-relevant species from the Bloody Roar video game series

== See also ==
- Unborn child (disambiguation)
- Unbirthing
