= BoyChat =

Online forum for pedophiles

- Website type: Internet forum
- Available in: English
- Owner: Free Spirits
- Commercial: No
- Registration: Required
- Launched: 1995; 31 years ago
- Current status: Active

BoyChat is an internet support forum for pedophiles, founded by the Free Spirits. The website describes itself as being frequented mostly by people who are attracted to "teen and/or pre-teen boys".

The forum has stated that its goal is to help its users live productive lives instead of inflicting harm on people under the age of consent. The website is part of a group of support websites organized by the Free Spirits, a Canadian nonprofit organization. Explicit and unlawful materials, as well as "erotica or overly-detailed sexual discussions", are not allowed on the website.

== History ==
BoyChat was founded in 1995 by the Free Spirits, a nonprofit organization based in Montreal, Canada, that has managed a number of support websites for people who are attracted to minors. The forum has been part of a network of other similar forums in other languages managed by the organization, including Castillo Azul (in Spanish), Jongens Forum (Dutch), Jungs Forum (German) and La Garconnière (French). BoyChat has also been a partner site of and reciprocally linked to Annabelleigh, a similar forum for pedophiles attracted to girls.

Perverted-Justice president Xavier von Erck stated in 2007 that BoyChat was part of a growing trend of pedophile websites. He told The Gazette in the same year that the Free Spirits "has been around since 1995 and has thousands of members", and that, "at one point, they were hosting 85 pedophile websites".

== Content ==
As of 2022, BoyChat was divided between a number of subboards, including the main board, Meta BoyChat for discussions related to the website's functioning, Treehouse for real-time discussions, Other Chat for off-topic discussions, and a board titled You Can't Do That On BoyChat, where some rule-breaking posts are listed. As of 2004, the website was receiving an average of 230 posts per day.

=== Demographics ===
Although the precise demographics of BoyChat's userbase is difficult to assess due to its anonymous structure, BoyChat has stated that its users are mostly adult males.

In a sample series of posts made on BoyChat in 2004, euphemistic labelling, a psychological process proposed by some researchers of child sexual abuse, was present in 24% of the messages. Other cognitive distortions were relatively uncommon, with moral and psychological justifications for sexual abuse appearing in 5% and 2% of the posts, respectively, and 1% and 2% of the sample minimizing or misattributing the consequences of sexual relationships with minors. The idea that minors are able to consent to sex with adults was present in 3% of the messages.

=== Rules ===
BoyChat does not allow sexually explicit or illegal materials, including pictures and external links to child sexual abuse material, to be posted on the website. Posting "erotica or overly-detailed sexual discussions" is also forbidden by the forum's rules. The website also prohibits posts that "advocate or counsel sex with minors", a rule that, the forum states, "does not extend to philosophical, political, or biological discussions". Other rules of the forum forbid users from encouraging others to engage in illegal activities or engaging in harassment campaigns against other users.
