= Gladys Edson Locke =

Gladys Edson Locke (pen name, G. E. Locke; 1887-1945) was an American mystery writer and librarian from Boston. Well-educated and never married, she also worked as a teacher, tutor, cataloguer, and history writer.

== Early life and education ==
Gladys Edson Locke was born in Boston, Massachusetts, in 1887. Her parents were D. Winfield Scott Locke and Caroline Augusta (nee Edson) Scott.

She graduated in 1906 from Girls' Latin School in Boston. In 1910, she received the A.B. degree from Boston University, and in the following year, the A.M. degree. In 1916, she was at Simmons College, studying library science.

== Career ==
From 1904 through 1914, Locke was a language tutor in French, Italian, and Latin. During the period of 1915-16, she taught Latin and English at Milford High School in New Hampshire. Beginning in 1917, Locke worked as a cataloguer in the Boston Public Library.

She published at least a dozen novels, in the genre of British country house mysteries and detective fiction with occasional recurring characters. These included: Queen Elizabeth (1913), That Affair at Portstead Manor (1914), Ronald O' the Moors (1919), The Red Cavalier (1922), The Scarlet Macaw (1923), The Purple Mist (1924), The House on the Downs (1925), The Golden Lotus (1927), The Redmaynes (1928), Grey Gables (London, 1929), The Fenwood Murders (London, 1931), and The Ravensdale Mystery (1935), sometimes as "G. E. Locke" or "Gladys E. Locke".

She also wrote historical articles.

She was an associate member of the American Unitarian Association and a member of the Boston Society for Psychic Research.

== Death ==
Never married, Gladys Edson Locke made her home in Dorchester, where she died May 28, 1945.

== Selected works ==
- Queen Elizabeth (1913) (text)
- That Affair at Portstead Manor (1914) (text)
- Ronald O' the Moors (1919)
- The Red Cavalier or The Twin Turrets Mystery (1922) (text)
- The Scarlet Macaw (1923) (text)
- The Purple Mist (1924)
- The House on the Downs (1925) (text)
- The Golden Lotus (1927)
- The Redmaynes (1928)
- Grey Gables (London, 1929)
- The Fenwood Murders (London, 1931)
- The Ravensdale Mystery (1935)
