= Jorge López Orozco =

Mexican murderer (born 1976)

FBI Ten Most Wanted Fugitive
- Charges: Unlawful flight to avoid prosecution - Murder (3 counts)
- Alias: "Pepe", "Raúl Solario"

Description
- Born: April 22, 1976 (age 49); Mexico

Status
- Added: March 17, 2005
- Caught: October 8, 2009
- Number: 480
- Captured

Jorge Alberto López Orozco (born April 22, 1976), is a Mexican former fugitive. He was wanted for the murder of his girlfriend and her two children and unlawful flight to avoid prosecution in Elmore County, Idaho. On March 17, 2005, he became the 480th fugitive listed by the FBI placed on the FBI Ten Most Wanted Fugitives list.

Lopez-Orozco was captured on October 8, 2009 in Zihuatanejo, Mexico. He was extradited to the United States and was convicted and sentenced to life without parole in 2013.

== Background ==
Lopez-Orozco is an undocumented immigrant from Mexico who earned income by distributing methamphetamines and helping his family with their farming business in Mountain Home, Idaho. His criminal record contained only an arrest during a traffic stop by Elmore County police on failure to possess a valid driver's license.

Rebecca Ramirez, Lopez-Orozco's former girlfriend, had separated from him and lived in her father's home in Nyssa, Oregon. Lopez-Orozco persuaded Ramirez to meet with him, and he picked her up along with her sons. In July 2002 Rebecca brought her two children with Lopez-Orozco and drove off in their car to head back to Mountain Home, where they lived.

After a few days, Ramirez' family alerted authorities because she did not contact her family. Investigators listed them as missing persons and the family awaited her return.

== Triple murder and investigation ==
On August 11, 2002, sturgeon fishermen were riding all-terrain vehicles along the fishing section of the Snake River just outside Mountain Home, Idaho. One of the fishermen spotted an abandoned and burned-out car and eventually discovered charred human skeletal remains. Authorities were alerted and the place was declared a crime scene.

DNA tests revealed that the remains were the bodies of Ramirez and her sons, Miguel and Ricardo. The car was set on fire after each victim had been shot execution-style in either the head or the chest.

Investigators recovered the car's license plate and tracked down its owner. He had sold the car, and he had a photocopy of the buyer's driver's license. The buyer was Jorge Lopez-Orozco. Later, investigators discovered that Ramirez had found out that her boyfriend Jorge was actually married with children. Her friends said that Becky was planning to break up with him. Detectives have suspected this being the motive for the murders.

Lopez-Orozco's brother Simon and his wife Maria Garcia were both also charged with accessory to first degree murder. It was alleged they assisted him with fleeing the state of Idaho and helping to conceal and provide transportation for the Lopez-Orozco family. After fleeing Idaho, Simon and Maria were last seen in San Jose, California in August 2002. Maria Garcia was captured in 2006, but Simon Lopez-Orozco remains at large. Prior to Jorge's capture, the FBI believed they were possibly residing in Mexico and Jorge might have used alias "Raúl Solario". He was considered armed and extremely dangerous. The FBI offered a $100,000 reward for information leading Lopez-Orozco's capture.

== Capture ==
On October 8, 2009, Mexican Federal Police arrested Lopez-Orozco in Zihuatanejo, Mexico. As of March 31, 2010, he was awaiting extradition to the United States in a Morelia prison. Prosecutors did not seek capital punishment against Lopez-Orozco, as Mexico refuses to extradite suspects who might face execution. He was returned to the United States and was convicted of murder and sentenced to life without parole. Lopez-Orozco is currently incarcerated in Idaho State Correctional Center in Boise.
