= Stella Nickell =

American murderer (born 1943)

Stella Maudine Nickell
- Born: Stella Maudine Stephenson; August 7, 1943 (age 83); Colton, Oregon, U.S.
- Occupation: Security screener at Seattle–Tacoma International Airport
- Spouse: Bruce Nickell (m. 1976; murdered 1986)
- Children: 2
- Status: Incarcerated
- Motive: Insurance payout
- Conviction: Tampering with consumer products (18 U.S.C. § 1365) (5 counts)
- Penalty: 90 years imprisonment

Details
- Imprisoned at: FCI Waseca

Stella Maudine Nickell (née Stephenson; born August 7, 1943) is an American woman who was sentenced to 90 years in prison for product tampering after she poisoned Excedrin capsules with lethal cyanide, resulting in the deaths of her husband, Bruce Nickell, and a stranger, Sue Snow. Her May 1988 conviction and prison sentence were the first under federal product tampering laws instituted after the 1982 Chicago Tylenol murders.

== Early life ==
Stella Maudine Stephenson was born in Colton, Oregon, to Alva Georgia "Jo" (née Duncan; later changed her name to Cora Lee) and George Stephenson. She grew up in a very poor family. In 1959, following the birth of her first daughter, Cynthia Hamilton, Stella moved to Southern California, where she married and had another daughter. She had several legal issues, including a 1968 conviction for fraud, a 1969 charge of child abuse for beating Hamilton with a curtain rod, and a 1971 conviction for forgery. She served six months in jail for the fraud charge, and was ordered into counseling after the abuse charge.

Stella met Bruce Nickell in 1974. Bruce was a heavy equipment operator plagued with alcoholism, which suited her lifestyle, and the two were married in 1976. However, during their decade-long marriage, things went sour after Bruce gave up alcohol and began to get sober. When his sobriety curtailed her bar visits, she began requesting evening shifts at her security screener job at Seattle–Tacoma International Airport and cultivated a home aquarium as a new hobby.

== Deaths ==
On June 5, 1986, the Nickells were living in Auburn, Washington, when Bruce, 52, came home from work with a headache. According to Stella, he took four extra-strength Excedrin capsules from a bottle in their home and collapsed minutes later. Bruce died shortly thereafter at Harborview Medical Center, where treatment failed to revive him. His cause of death was initially ruled to be natural causes, with attending physicians citing emphysema.

A second death less than a week later forced authorities to reconsider the cause of Bruce's death: on June 11, 40-year-old bank manager Sue Snow took two Excedrin capsules for an early-morning headache. Her husband Paul Webking took two capsules from the same bottle for arthritis and left the house for work. At 6:30 am, their 15-year-old daughter Hayley found Sue collapsed on the bathroom floor, unresponsive and with a faint pulse. Paramedics transported Snow to Harborview Medical Center, but she died later that day without regaining consciousness.

== Investigation ==
=== Initial investigation ===
During an autopsy on Snow, Assistant Medical Examiner Janet Miller detected the scent of bitter almonds, an odor distinctive to cyanide. Tests verified that Snow died of acute cyanide poisoning. Investigators examined the contents of the Snow-Webking household and discovered the source of the cyanide was the bottle of Excedrin capsules both Snow and Webking used the morning of Snow's death. Three of the remaining capsules in the 60-capsule bottle were found to be laced with cyanide in toxic quantities.

A murder by cyanide was sensational news in Washington state. When another tainted bottle from the same lot was found in a grocery store in nearby Kent, Excedrin manufacturer Bristol-Myers responded with a heavily publicized recall of all Excedrin products in the Seattle area; further, a group of drug companies together offered a $300,000 reward for the capture of the person responsible.

In response to the publicity about Snow's death, Nickell came forward on June 19. She told police that her husband recently died suddenly after taking pills from a 40-capsule bottle of Excedrin with the same lot number as the one that killed Snow. Tests by the Food and Drug Administration (FDA) confirmed the presence of cyanide in her husband's remains and two Excedrin bottles Stella turned over to police.

Initial suspicions were directed at Bristol-Myers, with Nickell and Webking filing wrongful death lawsuits against the company. The FDA inspected the Morrisville, North Carolina plant where the tainted lot was packaged, but found no traces of cyanide to explain its presence in the Washington bottles. On June 18, Bristol-Myers recalled all Excedrin capsules in the United States, pulling them from store shelves and warning consumers to not use any they had bought; two days later the company recalled all non-prescription capsule products. On June 24, a cyanide-contaminated bottle of Anacin-3 was found at the same store where Snow bought her contaminated Excedrin. On June 27, Washington state effected a 90-day ban on the sale of non-prescription medication in capsules.

Examination of the contaminated bottles by the FBI Crime Lab found that, in addition to cyanide powder, the poisoned capsules also contained flecks of an unknown green substance. Further tests showed the substance was an algaecide used in home aquariums, sold under the brand name Algae Destroyer.

=== Focusing the investigation ===
With contamination of the Excedrin at the source ruled out, investigators began to focus their investigation on the end-users of the product. The FBI investigated possible product tampering as the source of the poison. At the time, Excedrin was packaged in plastic bottles with the mouth of the bottle sealed with foil and the lid secured with plastic wrap.

Both Nickell and Webking were asked to take polygraph examinations. Webking did so, but Nickell, who had started drinking heavily, declined. A lawyer representing Nickell told reporters that she was too "shaken up" to be subject to the examination. Investigators' suspicions began to turn to Nickell when they discovered that she claimed the two contaminated Excedrin bottles she had turned over to police were purchased at different times and locations. A total of five contaminated bottles had been found in the entire country, and it was suspicious that Nickell would have acquired two of them purely by chance.

With investigatory focus on Nickell, detectives uncovered more circumstantial evidence pointing to her as the culprit. She had taken out a total of about $76,000 (Note: Sources vary as to the exact amount. Some cite $71,000, some $75,000, and some $76,000. Gregg Olsen's Bitter Almonds provides $76,000 as the amount, based on actual trial testimony.) in insurance coverage on her husband, with an additional payout of $100,000 if his death was accidental. Even before Snow's death, Nickell had repeatedly disputed doctors' conclusions that her husband died of natural causes. Further FBI investigation showed that Bruce's signature was forged on at least two insurance policies. Investigators also verified that Nickell purchased Algae Destroyer from a local fish store; it was speculated that the algaecide became mixed with the cyanide when Nickell used the same container to crush both substances without washing it between uses.

Nickell finally consented to a polygraph examination in November 1986. She failed, and investigators narrowed their focus to her even further. Concrete evidence proving that she had purchased or used cyanide was lacking, and despite their relative certainty that she orchestrated the poisonings as either an elaborate cover-up for an insurance-motivated murder of her husband or a desperate attempt to force her husband's death to be ruled an accident to increase her insurance payout, they were unable to build a strong case supporting arrest.

=== Breaking the case ===
In January 1987, Nickell's grown daughter Cynthia Hamilton approached police with information: her mother had spoken to her repeatedly about wanting her husband dead, having grown bored with him after he quit drinking. Hamilton claimed Nickell even told her that she tried to poison Bruce previously with foxglove hidden in capsules. Bruce took them to no effect save for complaining of sudden drowsiness. Following that failure, Nickell began library research into other methods and hit upon cyanide. Hamilton also claimed that Nickell mentioned what the two of them could do with the insurance money if Bruce died.

When subpoenaed, records from the Auburn Public Library showed that Nickell checked out numerous books about poisons, including Human Poisonings from Native and Cultivated Plants and Deadly Harvest. The former was marked overdue in library records, indicating that she borrowed but never returned it. The FBI identified her fingerprints on cyanide-related pages of a number of the works she checked out during this period. By the summer of 1987, even Nickell's attorneys acknowledged that she was the prime suspect in the case.

== Arrest and trial ==
On December 9, 1987, Nickell was indicted by a federal grand jury on five counts of product tampering, including two which resulted in the deaths of Bruce and Snow, and arrested the same day. She went on trial in April 1988 and was found guilty of all charges on May 9, after five days of jury deliberation.

Nickell's legal team sought a mistrial on grounds of jury tampering and judicial misconduct. One juror had been a plaintiff in a case involving a pill baked into Pepperidge Farm Goldfish crackers. While it was deemed to be a manufacturing error, the defense thought that it involved product tampering and therefore should have been disclosed during jury selection. However, the motion was denied.

Nickell was sentenced to two terms of ninety years in prison for the deaths of Bruce and Snow, and three ten-year terms for the other product tampering charges. All sentences were to run concurrently, and the judge ordered Nickell to pay a small fine and forfeit her remaining assets to the families of her victims. She was denied parole in 2017.

As of April 2019, Stella Nickell was housed at female-only low security/minimum security Federal Correctional Institution, Dublin in California, just east of San Francisco. She will be eligible for release in 2040 with credit given for good behavior, by which time she will be 96 years old. Nickell petitioned for compassionate early release in 2022, stating that her health is failing; this request was denied. As of April 29, 2026 she is imprisoned at FCI Waseca with a release date of February 14, 2043.

== Appeals and subsequent petitions ==
Nickell continued to maintain her innocence after her trial. An appeal based on jury tampering and judicial misconduct issues was rejected by the United States Court of Appeals for the Ninth Circuit in August 1989. A second appeal, beginning in 2001, was filed by her new attorney, Carl Park Colbert, based on evidence obtained by private detectives Al Farr and Paul Ciolino, requesting a new trial on the basis of new evidence having been discovered that the FBI may have withheld documents from the defense. The appeal was denied, though Nickell and her team continue to assert her innocence. Nickell claimed that her daughter Cynthia Hamilton lied about her involvement in the case to reap the $300,000 of reward money; Hamilton eventually collected $250,000 of that money. Nickell also alleges that the evidence points to another person as the killer, and that the testimony about various smaller details in the case, such as the store owner who testified that she purchased Algae Destroyer, was influenced by promises of payment. In 2022 Nickell filed a petition for compassionate release in which she no longer maintained her innocence. Nickell was previously denied parole in 2017. Judge James Robart denied the petition.

== FDA regulations ==
After the 1982 Chicago Tylenol murders, new FDA regulations went into effect which made it a federal crime—rather than just a state or local crime—to tamper with consumer products. Local and state authorities can still file charges in such cases. Under this law, Stella Nickell's crime was prosecutable as a federal product tampering case and a state murder case, and she was not convicted of murder, but of product tampering that caused death. The possibility of state charges for the actual murders of Bruce and Snow continues to exist.

== In popular culture ==
Seattle author Gregg Olsen wrote about the Nickell case in his 1993 book Bitter Almonds: The True Story of Mothers, Daughters and the Seattle Cyanide Murders. The case was also featured in episodes of Autopsy, Forensic Files, The New Detectives, Mysteries at the Museum, and Snapped, as well as two episodes of Deadly Women. The murders are discussed in the Jodi Picoult novel House Rules, published in 2010. It was also featured in episode 93 of Casefile True Crime Podcast in August 2018. The case was referenced in an episode of In Plain Sight titled "Kill Pill", which aired November 23, 2018 on the Investigation Discovery channel.

The 2000 TV film Who Killed Sue Snow? was to be made about the Nickell case to air on USA Network, but was cancelled shortly before production began. One factor was strong objections from advertisers, including Johnson & Johnson, owner of the Tylenol brand of painkillers, which had been affected by the 1982 Chicago case. Additionally, network executives feared the film would inspire copycat crimes. The film would have been directed by Jeff Reiner and starred Katey Sagal as Stella Nickell.

The 2025 Bengali neo-noir investigative thriller, Durgapur Junction, is based on Nickell's case.

In 2025, popular content creator Ray William Johnson featured Nickell on his true crime video series.
