= Milford High School (New Hampshire) =

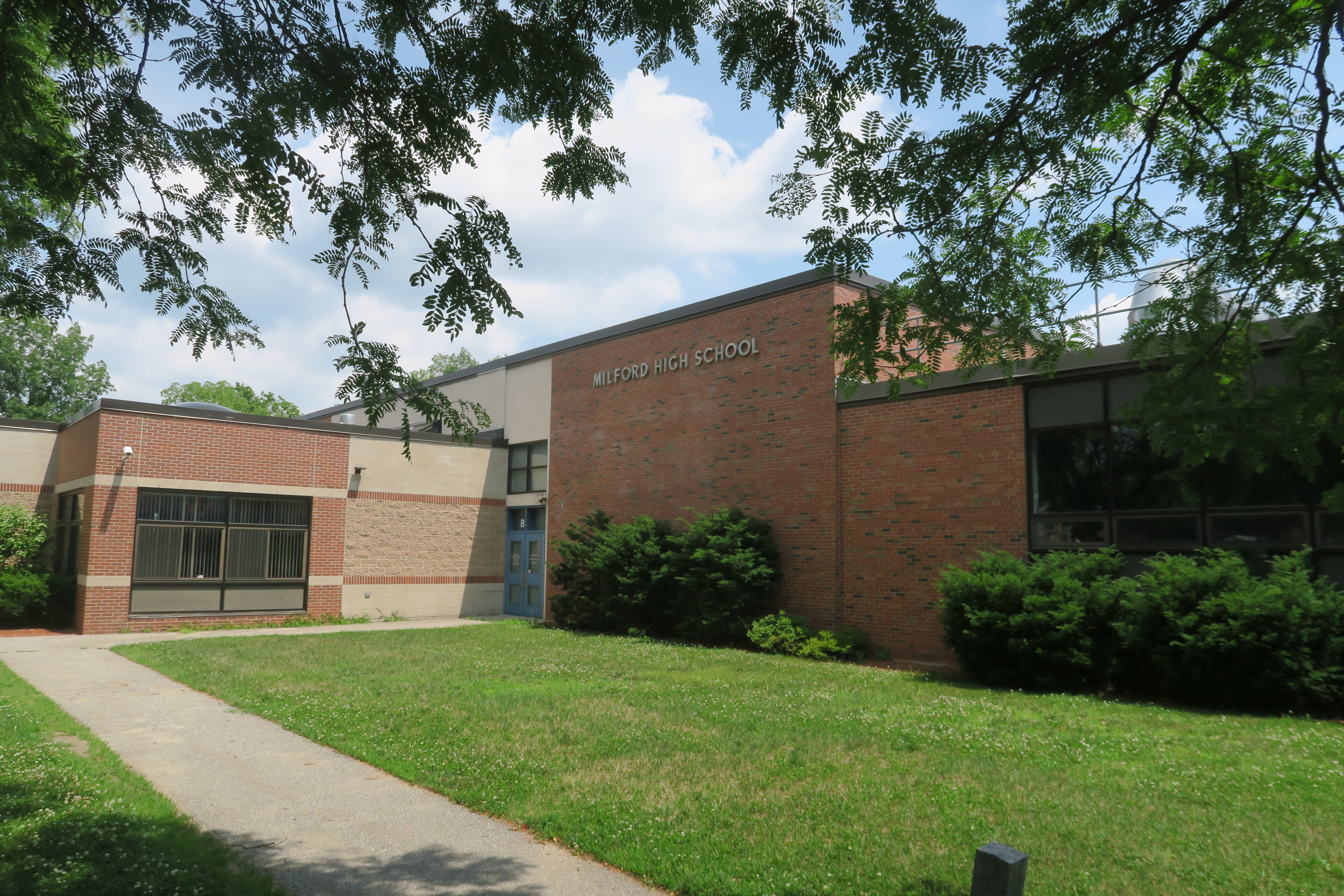

Location
- 100 West Street; Milford, New Hampshire 03055; United States; 42°49′44″N 71°39′34″W

Information
- Type: Public
- School district: Milford School District
- Superintendent: Christi Michaud
- School number: 330483000294
- CEEB code: 300410
- NCES School ID: 330483000294
- Principal: Jan Radowicz
- Teaching staff: 68 on ((FTE) basis))
- Grades: 9-12
- Enrollment: 817 (2019-2020)
- Student to teacher ratio: 12:1
- Campus type: Suburb
- Colors: Navy and white
- Athletics conference: NHIAA
- Nickname: Spartans
- Rival: Souhegan
- Website: mhs.milfordk12.org

Milford High School & Applied Technology Center is a grade 9-12 high school in the Milford School District located in Milford, New Hampshire.

== Athletics ==
The school competes at the Division II level. School teams include football, cheer, cross country, golf, soccer field hockey, basketball, volleyball, wrestling, swimming, indoor track, gymnastics, ice hockey, tennis, baseball, softball, lacrosse, and lastly track and field.

== Notable alumni ==
- Morgan Andrews, soccer player
- Erland Van Lidth De Jeude (1983-1987), actor and amateur wrestler
- Lisa Biron, Attorney and convicted sex offender. Sentenced to 40 years in prison for sex trafficking and sexual exploitation.

== Notable faculty ==
- Gladys Edson Locke (1887-1945), mystery writer and librarian
