= Genero Espinosa Dorantes =

Captured Mexican murderer

FBI Ten Most Wanted Fugitive
- Charges: Unlawful flight to avoid prosecution - Criminal homicide

Description
- Born: June 19, 1970 (age 55); Pachuca, Hidalgo, Mexico

Status
- Added: August 14, 2003
- Caught: February 25, 2006
- Number: 477
- Captured

Genero Edgar Espinosa Dorantes (born June 19, 1970 in Pachuca, Hidalgo, Mexico) is a Mexican criminal, who was the 477th fugitive listed on the FBI Ten Most Wanted Fugitives list.

== Background ==
He was wanted by the FBI for his alleged participation in the burning, beating, torture and murder of his four-year-old stepson in Nashville, Tennessee, in February 2003. He was considered armed and extremely dangerous. The FBI offered a reward of up to $100,000 for information leading directly to the arrest of Genero Espinosa Dorantes. On February 25, 2006, he was arrested in Tijuana, Baja California, Mexico. He was sentenced on July 8, 2006, and is currently incarcerated at the Northwest Correctional Complex, which is located in Tiptonville, Tennessee. He will be eligible for parole on December 12, 2064.
