= Michael Bray =

American minister and serial bomber

- Spouse: Jayne Bray (1976–present)
- Children: 11
- Status: Served 46 months from 1985 to 1989; living in Wilmington, Ohio, since December 2003
- Criminal charges: Conspiracy and possessing unregistered explosive devices in relation to 10 different bomb attacks
- Penalty: 10 years

Rev. Michael Bray is an American Lutheran minister and serial bomber. He was convicted in 1985, along with two other defendants of two counts of conspiracy and one count of possessing unregistered explosive devices in relation to seven bombings of women's health clinics and three offices of women's health advocacy groups in Washington, D.C., Delaware, Maryland and Virginia. Bray and his wife, Jayne, are the named defendants in the Supreme Court decision Bray v. Alexandria, a ruling that determined anti-abortion demonstrators could not block entrances to abortion clinics in order to stop patients from entering to receive services.

At the time of his conviction he was a member of the Christian moderately terrorist organization Army of God. Because of his involvement with the organization, public acts of terrorism, and suspected authorship of the underground manual Army of God, Bray is considered "the intellectual father of the extreme radical fringe of the antiabortion movement which engages in terrorism." Initially sentenced to ten years in prison, he agreed to a Alford plea and served only 46 months between 1985 and 1989.

== Background ==
Bray attended the United States Naval Academy for one year as a Midshipman. He was also a volunteer firefighter with the Bowie Maryland Fire Department. He was based in Bowie, Maryland, and later moved to Wilmington, Ohio, where he professes to be a member of the Army of God, considered a terrorist organization by the F.B.I. among others. Some of the writings that Bray completed during his involvement with the Army of God included the following:

- Army of God, an organizational manual that details how to do destruction and sabotage for abortion clinics. Bray is strongly suspected to be the author of this manual though he has never confirmed nor denied this claim.
- Capitol Area Christian News. (1991–2002). a militant newsletter that focused on homosexuality, abortion and what Bray considered to be government abuses of power
- Bray, Michael (1994), A TIME TO KILL: A Study Concerning the Use of Force and Abortion, Portland, Oregon: Advocates for Life Publications

== Religious extremism: Army of God ideology ==
The actions of Bray and other Army of God members were considered extreme and denounced by other anti-abortion groups at the time. Bray's Lutheran background informed the ideology he eventually developed in the time he spent in the Army of God movement, although this involved taking many Biblical scriptures and teaching out of context while actively challenging traditional interpretations made by mainstream theologians. Perhaps one of the most notable interpretations was the way Bray justified violent actions, and taking human life. From Bray's perspective, Christianity granted him the right to defend unborn children even if it meant doing violence, destroying property, and even killing doctors and staff who were "murdering them". They further justified their terrorist actions by claiming that they were defensive in nature, as they were defending the lives of innocent unborn children.

They considered US society was then divided into two parts, the secular state which condoned the practice of abortion, and those who shared their Christian identity and viewed this practice as morally reprehensible. Bray found perceived support for his justification of violence and murder in the previous writings of 20th-century Lutheran pastors Dietrich Bonhoeffer, whom he admired as a Christian martyr in his attempted assassination of Adolf Hitler, and theologian Reinhold Niebuhr. However, a primary difference between their ideology and Bray's is that both of them supported a separation between church and state, while Bray and the Army of God advocated for a type of politics that was biblically based and rooted in Christianity.
