= Sergio Dorantes =

Mexican photojournalist

Sergio Dorantes Zurita (born 1946) is a Mexican photojournalist.

== Life and work ==
Born in the outskirts of Mexico City to an indigent family, as a young man Dorantes emigrated to Europe where he studied industrial design. While working as an auto mechanic for Formula One racing, he discovered photography. He began his career as a paparazzo, and then as a photojournalist for various news and entertainment publications based in London. After living there for 17 years, he returned to Mexico City where he continued to work for an array of international publications.

Over the course of his career, Dorantes has covered five Mexican presidential elections. Many of his photos of presidents of Mexico have appeared on the cover of magazines such as Newsweek, BusinessWeek, and Forbes, and the front page of the New York Times. Dorantes is the only Mexican photographer to garner assignments worldwide with major international publications.

Dorantes has undertaken important photographic projects such as the documentation of Native Americans in the United States, the Tarahumara people of northern Mexico, the Zapatista uprising in the southern Mexican state of Chiapas, a long-term project on the Mexican elections from 1982 onwards, deforestation in Central America, women in Islam both in Indonesia and Malaysia, and the effect of modern technology on the livelihood of the traditional weavers of Lake Toba, Sumatra.

In his 24-year career, Dorantes' photos appeared in scores of major US and European periodicals, among them: newspapers such as the New York Times; Washington Post; Los Angeles Times; Sunday Times, Independent, and Sunday Telegraph (London); the Chicago Tribune; El País (Madrid); and magazines including Newsweek, Time, Forbes, Fortune, BusinessWeek, GEO, Elle, and Paris Match.

== Personal life ==
He was jailed in Mexico City for the murder of his wife, Alejandra Dehesa in 2003. However, on April 3, 2012, the judge in the case declared there was no evidence against him, and he was freed. The case had been highly controversial, not least because of the lack of forensic evidence and the only witness who places Dorantes at the scene of the crime had since recanted his testimony and it was proved that he was bribed by the DA in charge of the case.

== Exhibitions ==
- Asahi Pentax Gallery, London, England, one-man show. Photographer from the third world, 1980.
- Half a Penny Gallery, Dublin, Ireland, one-man show. Vision of a Red Indian, 1981.
- Biennial of Photography, Mexico City, Mexico. Collective, 1991.
- Mexican Museum of Arts, Chicago, Illinois. Día de Los Muertos: Where Past & Present Meet, 1996.
- University of Mexico City, CETIS, Mexico City, Mexico. Views from the World, 1999.
- Universidad Iberoamericana, Mexico City, Mexico, one-man show. Pictures and Covers of World Events, 2000.
