= Richard Goldberg =

American convicted sex offender and a former fugitive

FBI Ten Most Wanted Fugitive
- Alias: Terry Wayne Kearns

Description
- Born: Richard Steve Goldberg; November 9, 1945 (age 80); Brooklyn, New York, U.S.
- Occupation: Former engineer

Status
- Convictions: Child sexual abuse and possession of child pornography
- Penalty: 20 years in prison
- Added: June 14, 2002
- Caught: May 12, 2007
- Number: 474
- Captured

Richard Steve Goldberg (born November 9, 1945) is an American convicted sex offender and a former fugitive who was added to the FBI's Ten Most Wanted Fugitives list on June 14, 2002. Goldberg is the 474th fugitive to be placed on the list. He was captured in Montreal, Canada, on May 12, 2007, and subsequently convicted and sentenced to imprisonment of 20 years.

== Child molestation accusations ==
In 2001, Goldberg, a former Boeing aerospace engineer originally from Brooklyn, New York, became a babysitter in the Long Beach, California, area by gaining the trust of neighborhood parents and making his home attractive to children. Goldberg had several children's items, such as computer games, children's music, art supplies, swings, children's soap, and cages with rabbits and ducks.

On May 11, 2001, two young girls playing on Goldberg's computer saw an image of two of their young friends naked with their neighbor. Authorities were alerted, and an investigation was launched when six neighborhood children reported being sexually assaulted by Goldberg. Police searched his home in June 2001 and seized his computer. Investigators discovered images of child pornography on his computer, including photos of Goldberg himself engaging in sex acts with children. Goldberg was arrested, and he fled after $50,000 had been posted for his bail.

In July 2001, a state arrest warrant was issued in California charging Goldberg with six counts of lewd acts upon a child and two counts of possession of child pornography. Goldberg was subsequently charged with unlawful flight to avoid prosecution in a federal arrest warrant issued by the United States District Court for the Central District of California.

== Fugitive ==
Goldberg visited his parents briefly in Rumson, New Jersey, after leaving Long Beach. On July 26, 2001, he crossed the Canada–United States border, claiming to be on a business trip and using his U.S. passport. Despite his status on the FBI's list, he was able to withdraw nearly $50,000 from his U.S. bank account to finance the six years he spent in hiding in Montreal. Goldberg lived under the fictitious name Terry Wayne Kearns, backed by a Saskatchewan birth certificate, and was living off his savings and keeping a low profile. He was added to the FBI's Ten Most Wanted Fugitives list on June 14, 2002. He was considered armed and extremely dangerous. The FBI offered a reward of up to $100,000 for information leading to Goldberg's capture.

== Capture ==
In May 2007, Goldberg had been seeing a nonprofit counselor. He allegedly told the counselor he was an American fugitive, but the charges against him were "trumped up". The counselor had identified Goldberg as one of the FBI's Ten Most Wanted Fugitives and verified the outstanding arrest warrant for Goldberg by visiting the FBI's website, where Goldberg's photo and a description of his crimes were posted. He then told the FBI's Los Angeles Field Office where Goldberg was. Agents at the Los Angeles Office sent the information to the FBI's legal attaché at the U.S. Embassy in Ottawa, Canada. The attaché sought help from Canadian law enforcement authorities in Montreal. Members of the Royal Canadian Mounted Police (RCMP) and the Montreal Police Service (MPS) responded immediately and arrested Goldberg without incident at the address provided by the tipster.

After being a fugitive for six years, Goldberg was arrested by the RCMP and MPS for violating Canadian immigration laws on May 12, 2007. On May 24, he was deported from Canada to the United States, where he was tried on both state and federal charges of child sexual abuse and distribution of obscene material involving children.

Goldberg's lawyer, Jeffrey Boro, said his client was preparing to surrender himself days before his arrest. The lawyer suggested that Goldberg's inquiries and requests for help made him easy to track down.

== Trial and conviction ==
On December 10, 2007, Goldberg pleaded guilty in federal court to one count of producing child pornography, and he was sentenced to 20 years in prison. At his sentencing, U.S. District Judge John Walter said, "Goldberg is a deeply disturbed individual with a lack of remorse beyond belief."

Goldberg was incarcerated at the Federal Correctional Institution, Fort Dix, a low-security federal prison in Burlington County, New Jersey, and was later transferred to Federal Medical Center, Devens.

Goldberg was released on May 24, 2024, but was immediately rearrested by Long Beach police for crimes committed in 2001. For these, he is facing nine counts of lewd and lascivious acts with a child under 14 and two counts of possession of child pornography.
