= Shauntay Henderson =

American murderer and prisoner (born 1982)

FBI Ten Most Wanted Fugitive
- Charges: Second Degree Murder, and Armed Criminal Action
- Alias: Rasheda Smith, Rasheda Washington

Description
- Born: Shauntay L. Henderson; October 18, 1982 (age 43); Kansas City, Missouri

Status
- Penalty: 17 years
- Added: March 31, 2007
- Caught: March 31, 2007
- Number: 486
- Captured

Shauntay L. Henderson (born October 18, 1982) is an American felon. She was a fugitive wanted for murder for several months until she was apprehended by the FBI on March 31, 2007, after being on the FBI's Ten Most Wanted Fugitives list for less than 24 hours. A reward of $100,000 for information leading to her arrest was offered. She had a bench trial and the judge gave her parole with a 10-year suspended sentence, due to her being her own main witness in her trial and claiming self-defense. Five months later, while out on parole, she was pulled over and caught with narcotics and an illegal firearm, leading to a 17-year sentence with a release date in 2027.

== Biography ==
Henderson grew up in the Charlie Parker Square public housing project in Kansas City, Missouri.

== Criminal history ==
Police have suspected Henderson was involved in as many as five other murders and a number of other shootings. However, no other charges have been filed.

=== Manslaughter ===
On September 2, 2006, Henderson shot and killed DeAndre Parker at a gas station in Kansas City, Missouri. Henderson claimed Parker was trying to run her over with his truck. A judge acquitted Henderson of murder charges but found her guilty of the lesser charge of voluntary manslaughter and armed criminal action.

The Kansas City Police Department claimed that Henderson was a leader of the violent 12 Street gang who associated with gangs from 24th Street through 27th, 51st, and 57th Street. Their alliance was titled "512", "5 ace 2", or "5 ace deuce". However, the claims of the police were never substantiated. At trial, Henderson denied any involvement with gangs.

In May 2012, Henderson was sentenced to serve 10 years in prison for the 2006 manslaughter conviction for which she had previously been sentenced to probation. This sentence of 10 years will run consecutively to her seven-year federal sentence for the charge of being a felon in possession of a weapon so she will spend a total of 17 years in prison.

=== Felon in possession of a firearm ===
On October 27, 2011, Henderson pleaded guilty to felonious possession of a firearm. In April 2012, Henderson was sentenced to seven years in federal prison without parole. She was assigned BOP #05164-748 and served her sentence at the Federal Correctional Institution, Waseca.

After her release from federal prison, Henderson was sent to the Women's Eastern Reception, Diagnostic and Correctional Center in Vandalia, Missouri.
