= Clayton Waagner =

American bank robber and anti-abortion terrorist

FBI Ten Most Wanted Fugitive
- Charges: Escaped federal prisoner; Bank robbery; Unlawful possession of unregistered bomb device; Felon/Escapee in possession of firearms; Carjacking

Description
- Born: Roger Waagner; August 25, 1956 (age 70); North Dakota

Status
- Added: September 21, 2001
- Caught: December 5, 2001
- Number: 467
- Captured

Clayton Lee Waagner (born August 25, 1956) is an American convicted bank robber and anti-abortion terrorist. He was born Roger Waagner in North Dakota. He was an escaped fugitive during the spring, summer and fall of 2001 and was the FBI's 467th fugitive to be placed on the Ten Most Wanted list for carjackings, firearms violations, and bank robbery on September 21, 2001. He was placed on the United States Marshals Service Top 15 Fugitives list for sending more than 280 letters that claimed to contain anthrax, which he mailed to Planned Parenthood with return addresses of the Marshals Service and the Secret Service beginning in October 2001. He is currently in prison.

== Prior crimes ==
Waagner had previously been sentenced to 4–10 years for attempted robbery in 1992. Years later as a convicted felon released from prison, early in September 1999, he was pulled over by the Pennsylvania State Police, but fled into the woods and evaded capture, leaving behind a stolen car that contained firearms, explosives, false identity papers, and a list of abortion clinics.

Later in September 1999, while on a self-described "mission from God", he took his wife and their nine children on a cross-country road trip headed west in a stolen Winnebago, planning to murder various abortion doctors, beginning with one in Seattle, Washington. However, after crossing into Illinois his vehicle broke down, and Waagner was arrested when Illinois State Police stopped to investigate. Waagner was convicted on charges of interstate transportation of a stolen motor vehicle and for being a convicted felon in possession of firearms.

While he was awaiting sentencing and facing a term of 15 years to life, Waagner escaped from DeWitt County Jail in Clinton, Illinois, on February 22, 2001.

== Escaped fugitive crime trail ==
As an escaped fugitive felon from Clinton, Illinois, Waagner made his way back east to Pennsylvania, where three months later he became wanted for the bank robbery of a First Union in Harrisburg, Pennsylvania in May 2001.

His fugitive trail then led southwest, where he was next identified as having abandoned a vehicle in Memphis, Tennessee, following a hit and run accident. Authorities recovered law enforcement-type equipment, anti-abortion literature, and weapons from the car. He next became wanted for carjackings across the state line in Tunica, and Robinsonville, Mississippi, and firearms violations in Memphis, Tennessee, on September 7, 2001. Later that month, the FBI placed him on the list of Ten Most Wanted Fugitives, in the wake of the September 11 attacks.

== Anthrax hoax ==
Waagner's eventual notoriety is largely attributable to the hoax he then perpetrated in November 2001, in which he sent envelopes containing a white powder to more than 500 abortion providers. The envelopes also contained a note, which said, "You have been exposed to anthrax. We are going to kill all of you. From the Army of God, Virginia Dare Chapter". The threat was considered serious, as it arrived shortly after the September 11 terrorist attacks against the United States, as well as the then-recent delivery of genuine anthrax letters to various governmental officials. A United States Marshals Service Top 15 Fugitive since March 6, 2001, Waagner also became an FBI Ten Most Wanted fugitive because of the more than 280 letters that threatened to contain anthrax, which he mailed to Planned Parenthood, with return addresses of the U.S. Marshals Service and the U.S. Secret Service beginning in October 2001. In the wave of mailed letters, Waagner was accused of stalkings and threats to kill 42 low-level abortion clinic employees up through November 23, 2001.

On November 29, 2001, the FBI took the unusual step of issuing a press release of new information about Waagner, seeking the public's assistance, while also pointing out that Waagner's letters were not associated with the recent letters that had been sent to the offices of Senators Tom Daschle and Patrick Leahy which actually did contain anthrax. The white powder in Waagner's letters initially tested positive for anthrax, due to the addition of a powdered insecticide known to trigger false positive results.

== Capture and conviction ==
Waagner was captured on December 5, 2001, after a clerk at a Kinko's copy shop in Springdale, Ohio, identified him from a photograph on a wanted poster circulated by members of the United States Marshals Service. Waagner had been known to patronize Kinko's stores in the past, and for this reason the Marshals sent a copy to every store in the chain. When arrested, he was preparing to fax a bomb threat to a mass list of clinics. On April 18, 2002, in Cincinnati, he was convicted of separate firearms and car theft charges. For the anthrax letter spree, he received a 53-count indictment, and on December 3, 2003, he was convicted on 51 of the 53 counts, including charges of violating the Freedom of Access to Clinic Entrances Act, threatening the use of weapons of mass destruction, and mailing threatening communications. Waagner, already serving over 48 years in prison for other crimes, was sentenced to 19 years in a federal prison.

== Prison ==
Waagner is currently serving his sentence in FCI Cumberland, a medium-security federal correctional institution in Cumberland Maryland with a projected release in 2042.

== See also ==
- Christian terrorism
