= Emigdio Preciado Jr. =

American criminal

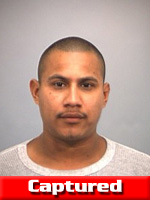

FBI Ten Most Wanted Fugitive
- Charges: Unlawful flight to avoid prosecution, attempted murder of a police officer, assault with a deadly weapon, parole violation
- Alias: Regalo Castaneda-Castaneda

Description
- Born: Emigdio Preciado Jr. August 19, 1969 (age 56); Los Angeles County, California, U.S.
- Occupation: construction worker, fisherman

Status
- Convictions: drug offenses, firearms offenses
- Added: March 14, 2007
- Caught: July 17, 2009
- Number: 485
- Captured

Emigdio Preciado Jr. (born August 19, 1969) is an American criminal, gang member and a former fugitive who was added to the FBI's Top Ten Most Wanted Fugitives list on March 14, 2007. Preciado is the 485th fugitive to be placed on the list.

After nine years on the run, Preciado was captured in Mexico on July 17, 2009, and is currently serving a 25-year to life prison sentence. The earliest year for parole is 2032.

== Criminal career ==
Preciado has a documented history as a gang member in the South Side Whittier street gang, which operates outside of Los Angeles.

Preciado is a career criminal who has been arrested for a 1992 murder, robbery, grand theft, and receipt of stolen property. He has been convicted of narcotics and firearms violations. At the time of the shooting, he was on parole for a drug-related crime.

== Shooting of Michael Schaap ==
On September 5, 2000, Los Angeles County Sheriff's deputy Michael Schaap and his partner, David Timberlake, were on patrol when they saw a 1979 Chevrolet van traveling toward them. As the van approached, the deputies noticed the van's headlights were not functioning properly and proceeded to stop the driver of the vehicle. When the van came to an abrupt stop, the deputies came under immediate attack from a burst of automatic gunfire. The gunman, one of four occupants traveling in the vehicle, appeared from an open door in the van and began shooting the deputies. Deputy Timberlake escaped without injury.

A bullet fragment from his assailant's AK-47 blasted into the bridge above Schaap's nose, ricocheted across his forehead and exited above his right eye. During surgery, doctors removed the remaining fragments of the bullet from Schaap's head, leaving a small wound, a horseshoe-shaped scar on his face and his left side partially paralyzed. Schaap had a long, painful recovery, which included intense therapy to re-learn cognitive skills.

Three other men in the car, Carlos Albert Gutierrez, Jose Leonchio Guardado and Omar Jimenez were arrested, charged and convicted of the shooting, but the fourth man remained at large. The alleged shooter was later identified as Emigdio Preciado Jr, and he became a suspect of the case.

In 2001, Schaap returned to work with an assignment to handle administrative duties and teach employment issues to his department. In an interview, he expressed his wishes for justice and a fair trial to Preciado if he were to be captured.

== Fugitive ==
In December 2000, Preciado was spotted and videotaped dancing in a town holiday festival in Tepuzhuacan, Nayarit, Mexico. Billboards profiling Preciado were installed in Whittier. Preciado was seen again in 2006 in Guadalajara, Mexico, and it was alleged that his family members or fellow gang members could have helped him evade authorities. Preciado had surgically removed his distinctive tattoos in Mexico.

On March 14, 2007, he was named by the FBI as the 485th fugitive to be placed on the Ten Most Wanted list. The shooting case was reviewed several times on the television show America's Most Wanted. There was a reward of up to $100,000 for information leading to his capture being offered, but it was increased to $150,000, with the FBI offering a $100,000 reward, and the Los Angeles County Supervisor's Office offering an additional $50,000. The reward would be paid to the tipster who helped Preciado's capture.

== Capture, extradition, and conviction ==
Preciado was captured in the hills near Corral Piedras, a rural area near Yagos, in Nayarit, Mexico on July 17, 2009. He had been living there, using the alias Regalo Castaneda-Castaneda and working as a fisherman.

Preciado was held in the custody of Mexican federal police and transferred to Mexico City, from where he was extradited to Los Angeles on January 12, 2010, in order to face trial. He was set for arraignment in Whittier Superior Court and his hearing was proceeded on February 19.

In July 2011, Preciado accepted a plea agreement and was immediately sentenced to 25 years in prison. During what was scheduled to be a preliminary hearing leading up to a trial, Preciado pleaded guilty to two counts of assault with a deadly weapon on peace officers, as well as the special allegation of using a firearm in a felony.

The former FBI Top Ten Most Wanted fugitive will need to serve at least 85% of this sentence before being eligible for parole, meaning the earliest he can hope to be paroled is in 2032.
