= Elephant Bar =

American restaurant chain

Coordinates: 33.140085°N 117.192622°W

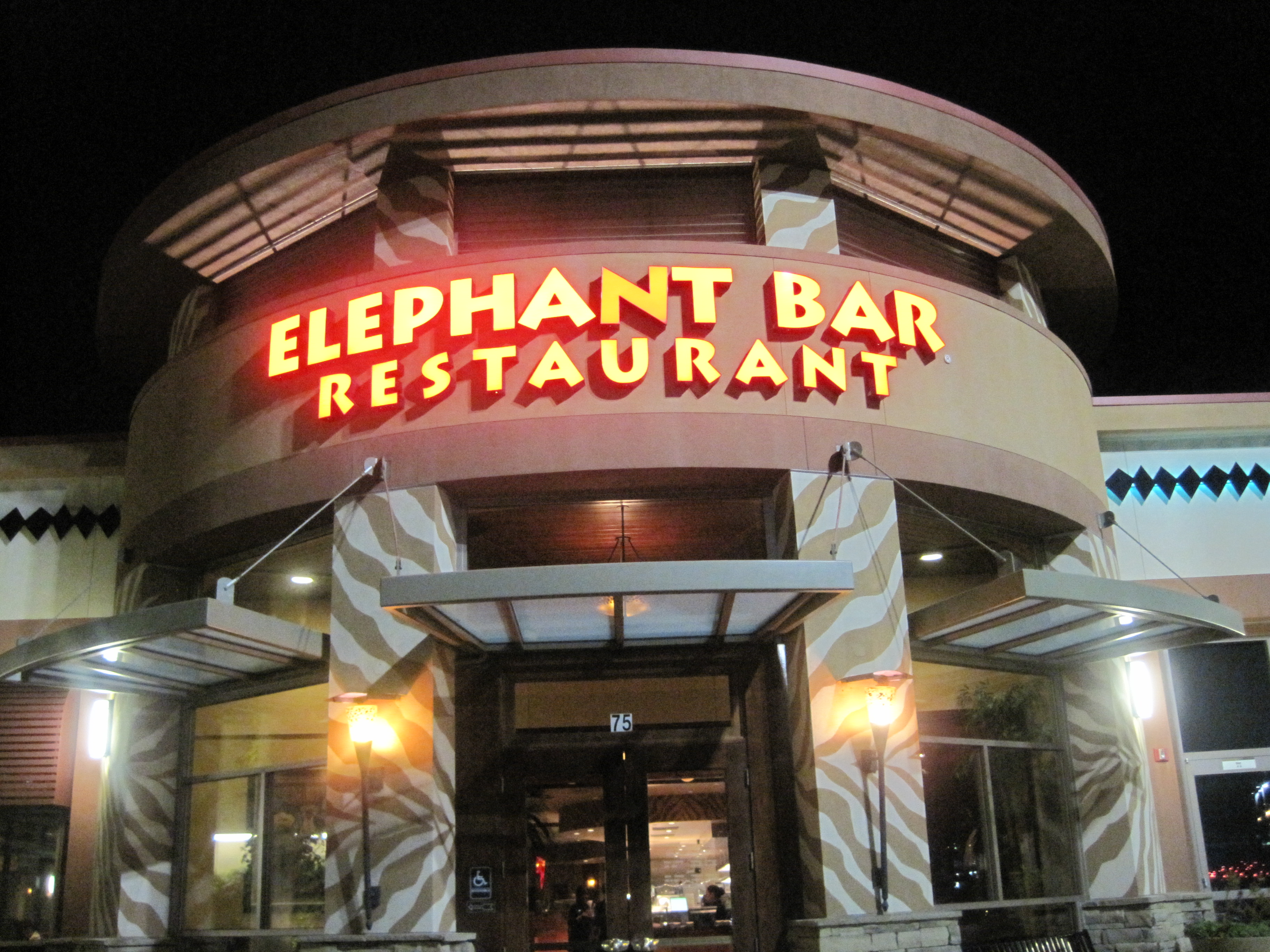
An Elephant Bar at Serramonte Center in Daly City, California.

Elephant Bar was a scratch-kitchen restaurant in the United States that specialized in globally-based dishes and traditional American fare. The corporate office was located in Las Vegas, Nevada. Their first restaurant opened in Lubbock, Texas in 1980. In 2015, the chain comprised 25 restaurants in the United States, with the majority in California and the rest in Arizona, Colorado, Florida, Missouri, Nevada, and New Mexico. The restaurants were decorated in an African safari theme, with wildlife and plant motifs. Many of the dishes offered were pan-Asian fusion concepts.

In 2014, Elephant Bar filed for bankruptcy and closed 16 restaurants. In 2017, Elephant Bar closed a number of restaurants with no explanation. In March 2018, Gen3 Hospitality purchased the Elephant Bar chain out of bankruptcy. By 2021, there was only one remaining restaurant, in Albuquerque, New Mexico, which closed in April 2023.
