= Army of God (militant organization) =

American Christian militant organization

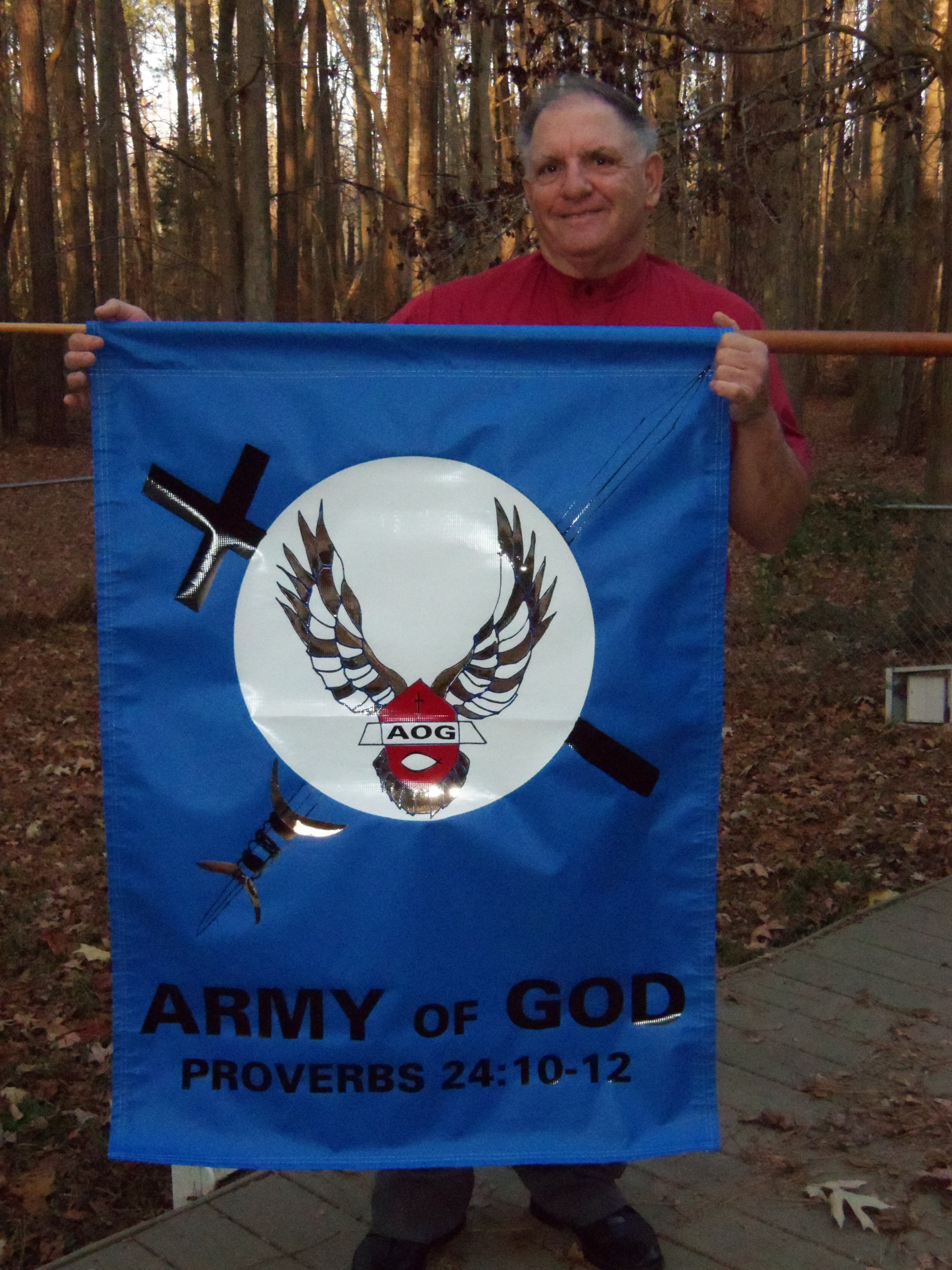
- Army of God spokesman Donald Spitz holds Army of God banner.
- Abbreviation: AOG
- Formation: 1982
- Type: Militant organization

Army of God (AOG) is an American Christian militant organization, members of which have perpetrated anti-abortion violence. According to the Department of Justice and Department of Homeland Security's joint Terrorism Knowledge Base, the Army of God is an active underground terrorist organization in the United States. In addition to numerous property crimes, the group has committed acts of kidnapping, attempted murder, and murder. The AOG was formed in 1982 and, while sharing a common ideology and tactics, the group's members claim that they rarely communicate with each other; this is known more formally as leaderless resistance. The group forbids those who wish to "take action against babykilling abortionists" from discussing their plans with anyone in advance.

== Actions ==
The earliest documented incidence of the Army of God being involved with anti-abortion activity occurred in 1982. Three men stating that they were the "Army Of God" kidnapped Hector Zevallos, a doctor who performed abortions, and his wife, Dr. Rosalee Jean, and held them hostage. The hostages were released unharmed after eight days. The "East Coast division" of the AOG claimed responsibility when three men, including Michael Bray, planted bombs at seven abortion clinics in Maryland, Virginia, and Washington, D.C. in 1985.

In 1993, Shelley Shannon, a very active member of the Army of God, was found guilty of the attempted murder of George Tiller and sentenced to eleven years in prison. The following year, Shannon was sentenced to an additional 20 years in prison on charges of arson, interference with commerce by force and interstate travel in aid of racketeering in connection to her participation in several fires and acid attacks on abortion clinics. She was released in 2018. George Tiller was later assassinated in 2009 by Scott Roeder during a Sunday church service. Roeder admired Shannon greatly and had visited her many times while she was in prison. That same year, law enforcement officials found the Army of God Manual, a tactical guide to arson, chemical attacks, invasions and bombings buried in Shelley Shannon's backyard. Paul Jennings Hill was found guilty of the murder of both John Britton and clinic escort James Barrett. The AOG claimed responsibility for Eric Robert Rudolph's 1997 nail bombing of abortion clinics in Atlanta and Birmingham as well as an Atlanta lesbian bar. The group is also responsible for sending a death threat via letter to former Supreme Court Justice Harry Blackmun, who wrote the majority opinion for Roe v. Wade.

Clayton Waagner, claiming to act on the part of the "Virginia Dare Chapter" of the AOG, mailed over 500 letters containing white powder to 280 abortion providers in 2001. The letters claimed that the powder was anthrax. Though it was not identified as such, the tactic took advantage of the public's fear of biological warfare after the recent real anthrax attacks. Waagner is a known criminal who utilized a number of aliases to elude police throughout his criminal history. The mailing of the letters suspected to have been filled with anthrax was done after he escaped from Dewitt County Jail in Clinton, Illinois where he was being held prior to sentencing for previously committed crimes.

The group is also associated with a number of other abortion clinic bombings, arsons and murders of abortion providers. Some of those responsible claimed association with the AOG; in other cases, while the killers expressed no affiliation with the group, the AOG has endorsed their acts and taken up their cause, stating that any action which prevents abortion is justified. Hill was head of a precursor organization called Defensive Action, which issued signed statements to members of Congress in the early 1990s expressing similar sentiments about "killing the killers".

According to the Global Terrorism Database, the group only ever managed to officially inflict one fatality, police officer Robert Sanderson, during their 1998 attack at an abortion clinic in Birmingham, Alabama. However, individual members of the group were known and convicted killers. This includes Paul Hill who not only committed shootings of abortion providers himself but even went so far as to appear on ABC's Nightline to justify shootings carried out by other anti-abortionists.

== Army of God Manual ==
The Army of God Manual is an anonymous document which was written by anti-abortionist members of the AOG and it is widely endorsed by them. According to the AOG website, the manual "is not to be construed as sanctioning any group or individual to perform any action."

The book, which consists of eight chapters and various appendices, delves into various pillars of their ideology and it is essentially a road map on how to commit violence against abortion clinics, abortion providers, and individuals who are associated with abortion. Parts of the book, specifically the appendices of chapters four, five and six, are not available for public consumption on the group's website due to federal laws. It is now in its third edition and the group refers to it as a historical document.

The manual is available in its near entirety on the AOG's website which was formerly run by Donald Spitz. Spitz has no history of criminal activity, but he has historically used the website to publish short bios of high profile group members, publish anti-abortion propaganda, post photos of what are claimed to be bloody fetuses that were aborted and he uses the website as a means to justify the actions of the group and incite others to support the Army of God and agree with what it stands for.

== Documentary ==
The AOG movement, along with a select group of individuals who are associated with it, are featured in the HBO documentary film Soldiers in the Army of God (2000), directed by Marc Levin and Daphne Pinkerson, as part of HBO's America Undercover series.

== Associated individuals ==
- Michael Bray
- Paul Jennings Hill
- David Leach
- Scott Roeder
- Eric Robert Rudolph
- James Charles Kopp
- Shelley Shannon
- Donald Spitz
- Clayton Waagner
- Fritz Springmeier

A 2011 NPR report claimed that an associate of this group, Stephen John Jordi, was imprisoned in a highly restrictive Communication Management Unit.

== See also ==
- Anti-abortion violence in the United States
- Christianity and abortion
- Freedom of Access to Clinic Entrances Act
- Jane's Revenge
- Missionaries to the Preborn
- Right-wing terrorism
- Domestic terrorism in the United States
- Unborn in the USA
