= Pedophile peer-support forums =

Pedophile peer-support forums (or pedophile support forums) are internet message boards and virtual communities that offer peer-support to people who are attracted to children. Such forums are distinct from message boards dedicated to the sharing of child pornography.

== History ==
Research has reported on peer-support forums for people who are attracted to children since 1999. Academic literature regarding online forums defines peer-support as a simple structure that facilitates support between like-minded individuals, instead of support provided by institutional or therapeutic environments. Although the word "pedophile" is regularly used to refer to the users of such forums, they also include people who are attracted to pubescent children.

Such forums are clustered into different subcultures, each with its own respective language and moral values. Participants of such forums usually avoid sharing pornographic media or discussing potentially illicit activities. According to a number of communications analyses, discussions on such forums usually center around sexual fantasies and personal accounts of non-sexual interactions with children.

The process of providing peer-support to people who are attracted to children has been considered by a number of researchers as a theoretically promising measure to prevent child sexual abuse. Some pedophile support forums discourage or ban discussions related to the morality of sexual relations between adults and minors, while others do not.

== Usage motivations ==
A significant number of people who participate in such forums do to so receive emotional support (80%), and a smaller number do so to receive informational support. A proportion of 81% do so in order not to feel alone, and 88% reported providing emotional or informational support to others. Avoiding isolation and discussing ways of improving one's quality of life are also motivations for frequenting support message boards, as well as sharing experiences.

Forum users have also used online chat rooms to and to exchange tangible support, such as money and housing.
