= Unborn in the USA =

Unborn in the USA: Inside the War on Abortion
- Directed by: Stephen Fell, Will Thompson
- Distributed by: First Run Features
- Release date: May 15, 2007
- Running time: 105 minutes
- Country: United States

Unborn in the USA: Inside the War on Abortion is a 2007 documentary film containing interviews with anti-abortion activists across the United States. Its tagline is, "How the pro-lifers are winning". The film was started as a thesis project by Stephen Fell and Will Thompson, students at Rice University.

The film chronicles major events such as the annual March for Life and the 2004 March for Women's Lives, and has interviews with members of the Army of God and other anti-abortion activists.
