= Lisa Biron =

American lawyer

Lisa A. Biron
- Born: 1969 (age 56–57)
- Education: Hesser College (BSBA); Franklin Pierce College (BA); Regent University School of Law (JD)
- Occupation: Attorney (former)
- Status: Imprisoned at Federal Correctional Institution, Hazelton; projected release date of September 20, 2047
- Conviction: January 20, 2013
- Criminal charges: Transportation with intent to engage in criminal sexual activity, possession of child pornography, sexual exploitation of children
- Penalty: 40 years imprisonment

Lisa A. Biron (born 1969) is a disbarred attorney from Manchester, New Hampshire, and a convicted child molester and child pornographer. In November 2012, she was indicted on federal charges related to the sexual exploitation of her 14-year-old daughter, including taking her to Canada to have sex with a man there. She was convicted on all charges in a January 2013 trial, and was sentenced that May to 40 years in prison. Biron is serving her sentence at Federal Correctional Institution, Hazelton.

== Early life and career ==
Biron lived in New Hampshire from 1972 and graduated from Milford High School in 1987. She then spent the next decade battling a drug and alcohol problem; she tallied numerous arrests for driving under the influence and driving with a suspended license. She was also involved in numerous abusive marriages.

By the start of the new millennium, she had become an evangelical Christian, and graduated from Hesser College (later Mount Washington College, now defunct) with a degree in business in 2001 and was valedictorian of her class. In her valedictory speech, she credited her Christian faith with turning her life around, as well as the birth of her daughter. "When I became pregnant with my daughter, I now had the responsibility for a second life," she said.

Biron graduated Valedictorian from Franklin Pierce College in 2005 where she earned her undergraduate degree in criminal justice. In 2008, she earned her Juris Doctor degree from Regent University where she served as Senior Editor of the Regent Law Review. Also while at Regent, she served as a member of the Trial Advocacy Board, and as a member of the moot court team. Biron was admitted to the New Hampshire Bar Association (ID #18908) and Massachusetts Bar Association (ID #672393) in 2008. She joined the Law Offices of Welts, White & Fontaine, P.C. in Nashua as an associate in September 2008, where she worked until 2012.

Biron's 2013 conviction subjected her to disbarment from the practice of law in both Massachusetts and New Hampshire; in nearly all American jurisdictions, a felony conviction is grounds for disbarment. On May 28, 2015, the New Hampshire Supreme Court entered an order disbarring Biron as a result of her conviction. The Supreme Judicial Court of Massachusetts followed suit on June 10, 2016.

As a lawyer, Biron worked with, or did pro-bono work for, multiple conservative-associated organizations.

== Arrest ==
On September 29, 2012, Brandon Ore, an 18-year-old from Merrimack, told Manchester police officers that he had seen child pornography on Biron's laptop computer. Ore had first met Biron in the summer of 2012 when he answered a Craigslist ad placed by "two girls, 18 and 33, looking to party." He moved in with them in July 2012 and had sex with the "18-year-old" on several occasions. However, two months after moving in, he moved back out and went to the police after learning that the two "roommates" were really mother and daughter—and that the "18-year-old" was really a 14-year-old girl.

Police obtained a search warrant for Biron's house on October 9. After a forensic search turned up five videos and two pictures of her daughter having sex with an unknown man, Biron was arrested that day and charged with seven counts of possession of child pornography. She was released on $35,000 bond. She was formally arraigned on October 26, and ordered to have no contact with her daughter, have no unsupervised contact with anyone under 18, use her computer only for work and not possess weapons. Her daughter was taken into foster care.

The Federal Bureau of Investigation was called in almost immediately, as Manchester police suspected the videos and pictures had been produced out of state. Agents from the FBI, United States Customs Service, United States Border Patrol and U.S. Immigration and Customs Enforcement discovered that Biron had taken her daughter to Niagara Falls, Ontario, on Memorial Day 2012 and coerced her into having sex several times over a three-day period with a man Biron had met on Craigslist.

On November 14, a federal grand jury returned a sealed indictment charging Biron with seven federal charges—one count each of transportation with intent to engage in criminal sexual activity and possession of child pornography, and five counts of sexual exploitation of children. Two days later, on November 16, Biron was awaiting a probable cause hearing to determine whether there was enough evidence against her to put her on trial on the state charges when FBI agents entered the courtroom and whisked her to the federal courthouse in Concord. There, she appeared before federal magistrate judge Landya McCafferty and was arraigned on the federal charges. Federal prosecutors told McCafferty that Biron had openly flouted her bond conditions. She had not only placed an ad on Craigslist, but had somehow acquired 200 rounds of ammunition and had been seen having sex and using marijuana, ecstasy and cocaine on several occasions—in some cases around children. She had also sent a threatening text message to Ore and had asked people to lie to investigators. Combined with other evidence, McCafferty ordered Biron jailed without bond, saying that while she was not a flight risk, "there are no conditions or combination of conditions of release that will reasonably assure the safety of the community." On January 3, 2013, an additional charge of child exploitation was added in a superseding indictment. According to John Kacavas, the United States Attorney for New Hampshire, this charge was based on evidence that Biron had recorded herself sexually abusing her daughter.

== Trial ==
Biron's trial took place on January 9, 2013 and January 10, 2013, before federal Judge Paul Barbadoro. Kacavas alleged that Biron was a frequent user of marijuana who used her daughter as "an object, a thing." Prosecutors also presented evidence that Biron plied her daughter with alcohol and drugs to lower her inhibitions and had tried to coach her testimony in court. They also introduced videos of several sexual encounters allegedly recorded by Biron.

Prosecutors called eight witnesses during the two-day trial. The first was Kevin Watson, the man seen in the videos taken in Canada. Watson testified that he had cybersex on several occasions with Biron's daughter on Skype before the May meeting in Niagara Falls. In one of three videos, a woman Watson identified as Biron said, "It takes practice, baby. It's not so easy." He also testified that before he had sex with Biron's daughter, he smoked marijuana and drank alcohol, provided by Biron, with her. As part of a deal with Canadian prosecutors, Watson was granted immunity from prosecution in Canada in exchange for his testimony.

Ore then testified that Biron had recorded at least one sexual encounter between him and her daughter on her phone, and that Biron tried to talk him out of going to the police when he found out that the girl was underage. Both he and Watson testified that they had frequently had sex with Biron while her daughter was watching.

On the trial's second day, the girl's father broke down crying after identifying the voices of both his daughter and Biron on a video Biron had recorded. He was so overcome by emotion that he left the courtroom before the video was played before the jury. The prosecution's final witness was FBI forensic examiner James Scripture, who testified that he had found numerous pornographic images and videos of Biron's daughter from Biron's laptop and iPhone, and was able to pinpoint the exact dates when they were filmed. Among them, he said, was the video of Biron's daughter having sex with Watson, which was intended as a "keepsake" of her first sexual experience.

Biron's attorney, Jim Moir, called no witnesses, instead claiming that the government could not prove its case beyond a reasonable doubt. The jury began deliberations at noon on January 11, and by January 15 had found Biron guilty on all charges. She was originally due to be sentenced on April 22, but sentencing was delayed until May 22 so she could complete a psychological evaluation.

== Sentencing, appeals, and incarceration ==
On May 22, 2013, Barbadoro sentenced Biron to 40 years in prison. He said that Biron had committed "extraordinarily egregious" crimes that did "incalculable" damage to her daughter's well-being. Under sentencing guidelines, Biron faced a minimum of 25 years in prison and a maximum of 100 years. Barbadoro indicated that he considered imposing the 100-year sentence, but opted not to do so in part due to a plea from her daughter. In a recorded statement, the daughter said that Biron was "not the monster she is made out to be" and wanted her to have a second chance. Barbadoro said that given the damage that the daughter has suffered, he needed to be sensitive to the need for her to heal, as well as assure her that she was in no way responsible for her mother's crimes.

In November 2014, Biron's conviction was affirmed by the First Circuit, and in March 2015, Biron's petition for certiorari was denied by the United States Supreme Court. On October 2, 2017, Biron's attempt to vacate her sentence was denied.

Biron, United States Bureau of Prisons Federal Register #12775-049, is presently serving her sentence at Federal Correctional Institution, Hazelton in Hazleton, Pennsylvania. According to the BOP inmate database, Biron's earliest possible release date is December 30, 2047, when she will be 77 years old.

=== Confiscation of manuscript ===
Biron complained that while she was incarcerated at Federal Medical Center, Carswell while completing a treatment program for sex offenders, prison officials wrongfully deemed her 144-page manuscript on Christian morality and sexual conduct to be contraband and confiscated it. Biron sought the return of her writings. Biron subsequently lost her Fifth Circuit appeal challenging the confiscation. The court held that since prison officials had qualified immunity, Biron had no grounds to sue.
