= List of people who survived assassination attempts =

This is a list of survivors of assassination attempts. For successful assassination attempts, see List of assassinations.

== Non-heads of state ==
Attempted assassination date		Intended victim(s)	Occupation at the time	Location of attempt	Country of attempt	Perpetrator(s)
1134		Hugh II of Jaffa	Count of Jaffa	Jerusalem	Kingdom of Jerusalem	A Breton knight
1272	June	Edward Longshanks	Heir to the English throne	Acre, Jerusalem	Kingdom of Jerusalem	Unnamed Muslim
1572	22 August	Gaspard de Coligny	Leader of the Huguenots	Paris	France	Maurevert
1582	18 March	William of Orange	Leader of the United Provinces	Antwerp	Dutch Republic	Juan de Jáuregui
1794	22 May	Maximilien Robespierre	Member of the Committee of Public Safety	Paris	France	Cécile Renault
1794	23 May	Jean-Marie Collot d'Herbois	Member of the Committee of Public Safety	Paris	France	Henri Admirat
1799	28 April	Jean Debry	French envoy to the Congress of Rastatt	Rastatt	Holy Roman Empire	Unidentified hussars
1842	6 May	Lilburn Boggs	ex-Governor of Missouri	Zion, Missouri	United States	Unknown
1861	February	Abraham Lincoln	President-elect of the United States	Washington, D.C.	United States	Baltimore Plotters
1861	22 February	Charles Van Wyck	Member of the U.S. House of Representatives	Washington, D.C.	United States	Three unidentified men
1865	14 April	William H. Seward	United States Secretary of State	Washington, D.C.	United States	Lewis Powell
1868	12 March	Prince Alfred	Duke of Edinburgh	Sydney	Colony of New South Wales	Henry James O'Farrell
1869	11 July	Thomas Eyre Lambert	Irish landlord	Athenry, County Galway	United Kingdom	Peter Barrett
1878	24 January	Fyodor Trepov	Governor of Saint Petersburg	Saint Petersburg	Russian Empire	Vera Zasulich
1889	13 February	Celso Ceretti	Italian socialist politician	Mirandola, Emilia Romagna	Italy	Intransigents of London and Paris (Vittorio Pini and Luigi Parmeggiani)
1889	15 November	José da Costa Azevedo	Minister of the Navy of the Empire of Brazil	Rio de Janeiro, Neutral Municipality of the Court	Empire of Brazil	Unknown
1891	11 May	Prince Nicholas Alexandrovich	Tsarevich of Russia	Ōtsu	Japan	Tsuda Sanzō
1892	23 July	Henry Clay Frick	American industrialist	Pittsburgh, Pennsylvania	United States	Alexander Berkman
1893	13 November	Mihailo Kr. Đorđević	Serbian diplomat	Paris	France	Léon Léauthier
1900	5 April	Edward, Prince of Wales	Prince of Wales	Brussels	Belgium	Jean-Baptiste Sipido
1902	18 May	Victor von Wahl	Tsarist governor of Vilna	Vilna	Russian Empire	Hirsh Lekert
1907	18 April	Nicolás Salmerón y Alonso	Spanish statesman	Barcelona	Spain	Political foe
1908	1 February	Manuel, Duke of Beja	Infante of Portugal (future King of Portugal)	Lisbon	Portugal	Carbonária (Alfredo Costa and Manuel Buíça)
1908	4 June	Alfred Dreyfus	French military officer	Paris	France	Louis Gregori
1910	9 August	William Jay Gaynor	Mayor of New York City	Hoboken, New Jersey	United States	James J. Gallagher
1912	7 June	István Tisza	Speaker of the House of Representatives of Hungary	Budapest	Austria-Hungary	Gyula Kovács
1912	14 October	Theodore Roosevelt	Former president of the United States and U.S. presidential candidate	Milwaukee	United States	John Flammang Schrank
1913	29 January and following weeks	David Lloyd George	Chancellor of the Exchequer	Sent from various sources	United Kingdom	Suffragettes (WSPU)
1913	14 May	Henry Curtis-Bennett	Magistrate	Bow Street, London	United Kingdom	Suffragettes (WSPU)
1913	16 May	Henry Curtis-Bennett	Magistrate	Margate	United Kingdom	Suffragettes (WSPU)
1914	17 March	John Purroy Mitchel	Mayor of New York City	New York City	United States	Michael P. Mahoney
1914	29 June	Grigori Rasputin	Russian monk	Pokrovskoye	Russian Empire	Khioniya Guseva
1915	17 May	João Chagas	Prime Minister-designate of Portugal	Santarém	Portugal	João José de Freitas
1915	3 July	J. P. Morgan Jr.	Banker	Glen Cove	United States	Eric Muenter
1919	April–June	A. Mitchell Palmer	United States Attorney General	Washington, D.C.	United States	Galleanisti
1920	3 April	Carl Gustaf Emil Mannerheim	General of the Finnish White Guards	Tampere	Finland	Finnish Red Guards
1920	August	Eleftherios Venizelos	Greek revolutionary and statesman	Paris	France	Greek royalists
1923	27 December	Hirohito	Prince regent	Tokyo	Japan	Daisuke Namba
1928	19 November	Herbert Hoover	President-elect of the United States	Andes Mountains	Chile	Severino Di Giovanni
1929	24 October	Umberto of Savoy	Prince of Piedmont	Brussels	Belgium	Fernando de Rosa
1931	22 July	John Ernest Buttery Hotson	Acting Governor of Bombay	Pune, Bombay State	British India	Vasudeo Balwant Gogte
1933	15 February	Franklin D. Roosevelt	President-elect of the United States	Miami	United States	Giuseppe Zangara
1936	26 February	Makino Nobuaki	Lord Keeper of the Privy Seal	Tokyo	Japan	Imperial Japanese Army (IJA) officers
1936	March	Eleftherios Venizelos	Greek revolutionary and statesman	Athens	Greece	Greek royalists
1940	24 May	Leon Trotsky	Prominent anti-Stalinist figure	Mexico City	Mexico	NKVD
1942	24 February	Franz von Papen	Nazi Germany's Ambassador to Turkey	Ankara	Turkey	NKVD agents
1943	5 June	José P. Laurel	Commissioner of the Interior, Philippine Executive Commission	Mandaluyong	Philippines	Feliciano Lizardo (disputed)
1948	20 April	Walter Reuther	President of the UAW	Detroit	United States	Unknown
1949	24 May	Victor Reuther	UAW Director of Education	Detroit	United States	Unknown
1951	20 July	Hussein of Jordan (Note: Abdullah I of Jordan, who was Hussein's grandfather and the intended target of the assassination, did die as a result of the assassination.)	2nd in line to the throne	East Jerusalem	Jordan	Mustapha Shukri Usho
1952	20 January	Anton Vovk	Auxiliary bishop of Ljubljana	Novo Mesto	Yugoslavia	Avgust Mežnaršič
1954	5 August	Carlos Lacerda	Candidate for federal deputy for the Federal District	Rio de Janeiro	Brazil	Alcino João do Nascimento
1958	20 September	Martin Luther King Jr.	American civil rights activist and Baptist minister	New York City	United States	Izola Curry
1960	11 December	John F. Kennedy	President-elect of the United States	Florida	United States	Richard Paul Pavlick
1962	27 February	Ngô Đình Nhu	Chief Republic of Vietnam presidential adviser and brother of Ngô Đình Diệm	Saigon	South Vietnam	Nguyễn Văn Cử and Phạm Phú Quốc
1963	10 April	Edwin Walker	United States Army officer	Dallas	United States	Lee Harvey Oswald
1966	7 June	James Meredith	Civil rights activist	Hernando, Mississippi	United States	Aubrey James Norvell
1966	21 June	Arthur Calwell	Australian Opposition Leader, Leader of the Australian Labor Party	Mosman, Sydney	Australia	Peter Kocan
1966	25 July	Artur da Costa e Silva	Minister of War of Brazil and candidate for the Presidency of Brazil	Recife, Pernambuco	Brazil	Unknown
1966	18 October	Bhim Singh	President of the National Students Union of India	Jammu, Jammu and Kashmir	India	Senior superintendent of police
1967	8 June	Estácio Souto Maior	Federal Deputy for Pernambuco	Brasília, Federal District	Brazil	Nelson Carneiro
1967	8 June	Nelson Carneiro	Federal Deputy for Guanabara	Brasília, Federal District	Brazil	Estácio Souto Maior
1968	11 April	Rudi Dutschke	German student activist	West Berlin	West Germany	Josef Bachmann
1968	3 June	Andy Warhol	American artist	New York City	United States	Valerie Solanas
1970	24 April	Chiang Ching-kuo	Vice Premier of the Republic of China	New York City	United States	Peter Huang
1971	8 August	Alexander Solzhenitsyn	Soviet dissident	Novocherkassk	Soviet Union	KGB
1972	15 May	George Wallace	U.S. presidential candidate	Laurel, Maryland	United States	Arthur Bremer
1972	7 December	Imelda Marcos	First Lady of the Philippines	Manila	Philippines	Carlito Dimahilig
1973	30 December	Joseph Sieff	Honorary vice-president of the British Zionist Federation	London	United Kingdom	Ilich Ramírez Sánchez
1974	8 March	Asari Giichi	Mayor of Shiraoi, Hokkaido	Shiraoi, Hokkaido	Japan	Yagi Tatsumi
1974		Ali Hassan Salameh	Black September operative	Tarifa	Spain	Mossad
1975	6 October	Bernardo Leighton	Former Chilean Christian Democrat vice-president in exile.	Rome	Italy	DINA, Avanguardia Nazionale
1975	December	Íbis Cruz	Mayor of Jundiaí, São Paulo	Jundiaí, São Paulo	Brazil	Unnamed
1976	3 December	Bob Marley	Jamaican reggae musician	Kingston	Jamaica	Unknown
1976	12 December	Raymond Eddé	Lebanese member of parliament	Beirut	Lebanon	Unknown
1978	February	Ayad Allawi	Iraqi opposition politician in exile	Surrey	United Kingdom	Saddam Hussein's agents
1978	6 March	Larry Flynt	American newspaper publisher	Lawrenceville, Georgia	United States	Joseph Paul Franklin
1978	5 April	Antonio Cubillo	Canarian nationalist Movement leader	Algiers	Algeria	Spanish secret service members
1979	3 May	Amine Gemayel	Kataeb Regulatory Forces general	Bikfaya	Lebanon	Unknown
1979	4 June	Pierre Gemayel	President of the Kataeb Party	Matn	Lebanon	Unknown
1979	25 June	Alexander Haig	Supreme Allied Commander Europe	Mons	Belgium	Rolf Clemens Wagner
1980	April	Tariq Aziz	Deputy Prime Minister of Iraq	Baghdad	Iraq	Islamic Dawa Party members
1980	29 May	Vernon Jordan	American Civil Rights Movement activist	Fort Wayne, Indiana	United States	Joseph Paul Franklin
1980	10 June	Percy Wood	President of United Airlines	Lake Forest, Illinois	United States	Ted Kaczynski
1980	25 October	Khalid Duhham Al-Jawary	Black September operative	Beirut	Lebanon	Unknown
1981	16 January	Bernadette and Michael McAliskey	Irish socialist and republican political activists	Coalisland, County Tyrone	United Kingdom	Ulster Freedom Fighters
1981	27 June	Ali Khamenei	Tehran's Friday Prayer Imam	Tehran	Iran	People's Mujahedin of Iran, Furqan Group
1981	1 August	Abu Daoud	Black September operative	Warsaw	Poland	Khaled
1982	3 June	Shlomo Argov (Note: Although Argov survived the attempted assassination, when he died over 20 years after the attempted assassination, his cause of death was attributed to injuries sustained during the attempted assassination.)	Israeli ambassador to the United Kingdom	London	United Kingdom	Abu Nidal Organization
1984	14 March	Gerry Adams	Irish Republican politician and President of Sinn Féin	Belfast	United Kingdom	Ulster Freedom Fighters (UFF)
1985	8 March	Mohammad Hussein Fadlallah	Lebanese Grand Ayatollah and mentor to Hezbollah	Beirut	Lebanon	CIA linked group
1985	12 November	Camille Chamoun	Former president of Lebanon and leader of the National Liberal Party	Beirut	Lebanon	Vanguard of Arab Christians
1985	12 November	Elie Karamé	President of the Kataeb Party	Beirut	Lebanon	Vanguard of Arab Christians
1986	25 May	Malkiat Singh Sidhu	Planning Minister in the Government of Punjab, India	Gold River	Canada	Jaspal Atwal, Jasbir Singh Atwal, Amarjit Singh Dhindsa and Sukhdial Singh Gill
1988	18 June	Turgut Özal	Prime Minister of Turkey	Ankara	Turkey	Kartal Demirağ
1988	11 September	Jean-Bertrand Aristide	Catholic Salesian priest, political dissident, and future President of Haiti	Port-au-Prince	Haiti	Ex-Tonton Macoute member
1988	20 October	Nikola Štedul	Croat émigré from Yugoslavia and head of the Croatian Statehood Movement	Kirkcaldy, Scotland	United Kingdom	Vinko Sindičić, UDBA agent
1988	17 November	Antoine Lahad	Lebanese general and leader of the South Lebanon Army	Southern Lebanon	Lebanon	Souha Bechara
1989	14 July	Jani Allan	South African columnist	Johannesburg	South Africa	Cornelius Lottering, Orde van die Dood member
1989	3 August	Salman Rushdie	British Indian novelist and essayist	London	United Kingdom	Mustafa Mahmoud Mazeh
1989	27 November	César Gaviria	Candidate of 1990 Colombian presidential election	Bogotá	Colombia	Medellin Cartel
1990	18 January	Motoshima Hitoshi	Mayor of Nagasaki, Japan	Nagasaki	Japan	Seikijuku member
1990	25 April	Oskar Lafontaine	Minister-President of Saarland	Cologne	West Germany	Adelheid Streidel
1990	18 September	Peter Terry	British Governor of Gibraltar	Milford, Staffordshire	United Kingdom	Provisional Irish Republican Army
1990	12 October	Wolfgang Schäuble	German Minister of the Interior	Oppenau	Germany	Dieter Kaufmann
1990	25 October	Byron Barrera	Guatemalan journalist	Guatemala City	Guatemala	Members of the military implicated
1991	12 January	Al Sharpton	American civil rights activist and Baptist minister	Brooklyn, New York	United States	Michael Riccardi
1991	4 November	Mohammed Zahir Shah	Former King of Afghanistan	Rome	Italy	Paulo Jose de Almeida Santos
1992	19 June	Curtis Sliwa	Founder of the Guardian Angels	Manhattan	United States	Michael Yannotti (alleged)
1992	5 December	Jiří Svoboda	Leader of the Communist Party of Bohemia and Moravia	Prague	Czechoslovakia	Unknown
1993	2 July	Aziz Nesin	Turkish translator of "The Satanic Verses"	Sivas	Turkey	Sunni Wahhabi and Salafist extremist mob
1993	19 August	George Tiller	Abortion provider	Wichita	United States	Shelley Shannon
1993	11 October	William Nygaard	Norwegian publisher of The Satanic Verses	Oslo	Norway	Khaled Moussawi and an accomplice
1993	5 December	Helmut Zilk	Mayor of Vienna	Vienna	Austria	Franz Fuchs
1994	June	Boris Berezovsky	Russian oligarch and later prominent Russian opposition figure	Moscow	Russia	Unknown
1994	14 October	Naguib Mahfouz	Egyptian writer	Cairo	Egypt	Ordered by Sheikh Omar Abdel-Rahman
1994	8 November	Garson Romalis	Abortion provider	Vancouver	Canada	James Kopp (suspected)
1995	19 April	José María Aznar	Head of the People's Party and future Prime Minister of Spain	Madrid	Spain	ETA
1995	4 November	Mengistu Haile Mariam	Former President of Ethiopia	Harare	Zimbabwe	Solomon Haile Ghebre Michael and Abraham Goletom Joseph
1996	4 July	Nimal Siripala de Silva	Sri Lankan Minister of Housing	Jaffna	Sri Lanka	Liberation Tigers of Tamil Eelam
1996	12 September	Björk	Musician	London	United Kingdom	Ricardo López
1996	12 December	Uday Hussein	Son and heir-apparent of Iraqi president Saddam Hussein	Baghdad	Iraq	Salman Sharif, and three others
1997	25 September	Khaled Mashal	Chairman of the Hamas Political Bureau	Amman	Jordan	Mossad
1998	6 December	General Anuruddha Ratwatte	Sri Lankan Minister of Energy and Deputy Defence Minister	Oddusuddan	Sri Lanka	Liberation Tigers of Tamil Eelam
1999	3 October	Vuk Drašković	Former deputy prime minister of the Federal Republic of Yugoslavia	Ibar Highway	FR Yugoslavia	Serbian State Security Special Ops Force
1999	30 December	George Harrison	Musician and former member of the Beatles	Henley-on-Thames	United Kingdom	Michael Abram
2000	March	Saeed Hajjarian	Iranian intellectual, prominent journalist, pro-democracy activist	Tehran	Iran	Members of the Basij militia
2000	15 June	Vuk Drašković	Former Deputy Prime Minister of the Federal Republic of Yugoslavia	Budva	FR Yugoslavia	Milorad Ulemek and Slobodan Milošević
2000	11 July	Garson Romalis	Abortion provider	Vancouver	Canada	Unknown
2001	1 June	Ezekiel Alebua	Former Prime Minister of the Solomon Islands, serving as Premier of Guadalcanal	Guadalcanal	Solomon Islands	Harold Keke's Isatabu Freedom Movement
2002	5 October	Bertrand Delanoë	Mayor of Paris	Paris	France	Azedine Berkane
2003	April	Iyabo Obasanjo-Bello	Nigerian Commissioner for Health	Ogun State	Nigeria	Unknown
2003	1 October	N. Chandrababu Naidu	Chief Minister of Andhra Pradesh	Alipiri, Tirupati, Andhra Pradesh	India	People's War Group
2004	10 June	Ahsan Saleem Hayat	Commander V Corps	Karachi	Pakistan	Jundallah
2004	1 September	Anna Politkovskaya	Journalist	Rostov-on-Don	Russia	Unknown
2004	1 September	Ahmad Chalabi	Iraqi politician	Latifiya	Iraq	Unknown
2004	September	Viktor Yushchenko	Former Prime Minister of Ukraine, candidate for President of Ukraine	Unknown	Ukraine	Unknown
2004	1 October	Marwan Hamadeh	Minister of Economy and Trade	Beirut	Lebanon	Unknown
2005	17 March	Anatoly Chubais	Former deputy Prime Minister of Russia administrator of RAO UES	Moscow	Russia	Vladimir Kvachkov
2005	12 July	Elias Murr	Deputy Prime Minister of Lebanon	Antelias	Lebanon	Speculators claim the perpetrators to be pro-Syrian forces, most likely Hezbollah.
2005	25 September	May Chidiac	Lebanese journalist	Beirut	Lebanon	Speculators claim the perpetrators to be pro-Syrian forces, most likely Hezbollah.
2006	February	Suhaylah Abd-Jaafar	Minister of Displacement and Migration	Baghdad	Iraq	Unknown
2006	12 March	Sibghatullah Mojadeddi	President of the Senate of Afghanistan	Kabul	Afghanistan	Unknown
2006	25 April	Lt. General Sarath Fonseka	Commander of the Sri Lanka Army	Colombo	Sri Lanka	Liberation Tigers of Tamil Eelam
2006	20 May	Park Geun-hye	South Korean MP and Leader of the Grand National Party	Seoul	South Korea	Ji Chung-ho
2006	30 May	Georgios Voulgarakis	Greek Minister of Culture	Athens	Greece	Revolutionary Struggle
2006	16 October	Alexander Litvinenko	Prominent Russian opposition figure	London	United Kingdom	FSB agents Andrey Lugovoy and Dmitry Kovtun, "probably" approved by FSB head Nikolai Patrushev and Russian president Vladimir Putin
2006	25 October	Alexander Litvinenko	Prominent Russian opposition figure	London	United Kingdom	FSB agents Andrey Lugovoy and Dmitry Kovtun, "probably" approved by FSB head Nikolai Patrushev and Russian president Vladimir Putin
2006	24 November	Yegor Gaidar	Prominent Russian opposition figure	Moscow	Russia	Unknown
2006	1 December	Gotabaya Rajapaksa	Secretary of Defense of Sri Lanka and brother of President Mahinda Rajapaksa	Kollupitiya	Sri Lanka	Liberation Tigers of Tamil Eelam
2007	February	Robert O. Blake Jr.	United States Ambassador to Sri Lanka and the Maldives	Batticaloa	Sri Lanka	Liberation Tigers of Tamil Eelam
2007	26 February	Adil Abdul-Mahdi	Vice President of Iraq	Baghdad	Iraq	Unknown
2007	27 February	Dick Cheney	Vice President of the United States	Bagram Airfield	Afghanistan	Taliban
2007	14 April	Onyema Ugochukwu	Gubernatorial candidate in Abia State	Abia State	Nigeria	Unknown
2007	9 May	Ramzan Kadyrov	Head of the Chechen Republic	Moscow	Russia	Adam Osmayev (alleged)
2007	June	Boris Berezovsky	Prominent opponent to Vladimir Putin	London	United Kingdom	Russian security services
2007	18 October	Benazir Bhutto	Pakistani opposition leader and ex-Prime Minister	Karachi	Pakistan	Usama al-Kini and Baitullah Mehsud
2008	15 March	Dmitry Medvedev	President elect of Russia	Moscow		Shakhvelad Osmanov
2008	October	Karinna Moskalenko	Prominent Russian opposition figure	Moscow	Russia	Likely Russian security services
2008	8 October	Maithripala Sirisena	Sri Lankan Minister of Agricultural Development & Agrarian Services	Colombo	Sri Lanka	Liberation Tigers of Tamil Eelam
2009	11 March	Mahinda Yapa Abeywardena	Sri Lankan Minister of Cultural Affairs	Akuressa	Sri Lanka	Liberation Tigers of Tamil Eelam
2009	11 March	Ameer Ali Shihabdeen	Sri Lankan Non-Cabinet Minister of Disaster Relief Services	Akuressa	Sri Lanka	Liberation Tigers of Tamil Eelam
2009	11 March	Pandu Bandaranaike	Sri Lankan Non-Cabinet Minister of Religious Affairs	Akuressa	Sri Lanka	Liberation Tigers of Tamil Eelam
2009	11 March	A. H. M. Fowzie	Sri Lankan Minister of Petroleum & Petroleum Resources Development	Akuressa	Sri Lanka	Liberation Tigers of Tamil Eelam
2009	11 March	Chandrasiri Gajadeera	Sri Lankan Non-Cabinet Minister of Home Affairs	Akuressa	Sri Lanka	Liberation Tigers of Tamil Eelam
2009	11 March	Mahinda Wijesekara	Sri Lankan Minister of Special Projects	Akuressa	Sri Lanka	Liberation Tigers of Tamil Eelam
2008	November	Mikhail Beketov	Journalist and prominent Russian opposition figure	Moscow	Russia	Unknown
2009	June	Yunus-Bek Yevkurov	Head of Ingushetia	Nazran, Ingushetia	Russia	Chechen rebels (blamed)
2009	31 July	Anvar-qori Tursunov	Uzbekistani imam	Tashkent	Uzbekistan	Islamic Movement of Uzbekistan
2010	1 January	Kurt Westergaard	Cartoonist	Aarhus	Denmark	28-year-old Somali
2010	25 April	Timothy Torlot	Ambassador of the United Kingdom to Yemen	Sanaa	Yemen	al-Qaeda in the Arabian Peninsula
2010	14 May	Stephen Timms	British Labour MP	Beckton	United Kingdom	Roshonara Choudhry
2010	November	Viktor Kalashnikov	Prominent Russian opposition figures	Berlin	Germany	Likely FSB
2010	November	Marina Kalashnikova	Prominent Russian opposition figures	Berlin	Germany	Likely FSB
2010	6 November	Oleg Kashin	Prominent journalist and Russian opposition figure	Moscow	Russia	Unknown
2011	8 January	Gabby Giffords	Member of the U.S. House of Representatives	Casas Adobes, Arizona	United States	Jared Lee Loughner
2011	13 May	Joss Stone	Singer, songwriter and actress	East Devon	United Kingdom	Kevin Liverpool and Junior Bradshaw
2011	29 September	Adel al-Jubeir	Saudi Arabian Ambassador to the United States	Washington, D.C.	United States	Manssor Arbabsiar and Gholam Shakuri
2012	4 April	Samir Geagea	Executive Chairman of the Lebanese Forces	Meerab, Mount Lebanon	Lebanon	Speculators claim the perpetrators to be pro-Syrian forces, most likely Hezbollah.
2012	9 September	Pauline Marois	Premier-designate of Quebec	Montreal, Quebec	Canada	Richard Henry Bain
2012	9 October	Malala Yousafzai	Human rights activist	Mingora	Pakistan	Pakistani Taliban
2013	4 January	Mohammed Magariaf	Head of Libya's General National Congress	Sabha	Libya	Unknown
2013	19 January	Ahmed Dogan	Chairman of the DPS party	Sofia	Bulgaria	Oktai Enimehmedov
2013	5 February	Lars Hedegaard	Chairman of the Danish Free Press Society	Copenhagen	Denmark	Basil Hassan
2013	26 June	Maqbool Baqar	Judge of the High Court of Sindh	Karachi	Pakistan	Jundallah
2013	27 October	Narendra Modi	Chief Minister of Gujarat and the prime ministerial candidate for the 2014 Indian general election	Patna, Bihar	India	Indian Mujahideen; Students' Islamic Movement of India
2014	29 October	Yehuda Glick	Chairman of the Temple Mount Heritage Foundation	Jerusalem	Israel	Mutaz Hijazi
2015	26 May	Vladimir Kara-Murza	Prominent Russian opposition figure	Moscow	Russia	Likely FSB
2015	17 October	Henriette Reker	Mayor of Cologne	Cologne	Germany	Unnamed 44-year-old far-right extremist
2016	1 March	Aaidh al-Qarni	Saudi Arabian Islamic scholar, author, and activist	Zamboanga City	Philippines	21-year-old Filipino
2016	21 May	Mayu Tomita	Japanese singer and actress	Koganei, Tokyo	Japan	Tomohiro Iwazaki
2016	18 June	Donald Trump	American businessman, media personality, and presidential candidate	Las Vegas, Nevada	United States	Michael Steven Sandford
2016	28 September	José Eliton	Vice Governor of Goiás	Itumbiara, Goiás	Brazil	Gilberto Ferreira do Amaral
2017	2 February	Vladimir Kara-Murza	Prominent Russian opposition figure	Moscow	Russia	Likely FSB
2017	12 May	Abdul Ghafoor Haideri	Deputy Chairman of the Senate of Pakistan	Mastung	Pakistan	ISIL
2017	12 June	Steve Scalise	House Majority Whip & Member of U.S. House of Representatives from Louisiana's 1st district	Virginia	United States	James Hodgkinson
2017	2 September	Yulia Latynina	Journalist and prominent Russian opposition figure	Moscow	Russia	Unknown
2017	23 October	Tatyana Felgenhauer	Journalist and prominent Russian opposition figure	Moscow	Russia	Unknown
2017	11 November	Nyesom Wike	Governor of Rivers State	Port Harcourt	Nigeria	Special Anti Robbery Squad
2018	4 March	Sergei Skripal and Yulia Skripal	Intelligence officer	Salisbury	United Kingdom	G.U. Intelligence Service agents 'Alexander Petrov' and 'Ruslan Boshirov' (both names believed to be aliases), "almost certainly" on the direct orders of the Kremlin
2018	6 September	Jair Bolsonaro	Federal deputy for Rio de Janeiro; Presidential candidate for the 2018 Brazilian general election	Juiz de Fora, Minas Gerais	Brazil	Adélio Bispo de Oliveira
2018	12 September	Pyotr Verzilov	Musician, opposition activist	Moscow	Russia	Unknown
2018	18 October	Austin S. Miller	United States Army general and Commander of NATO's Resolute Support Mission	Kandahar	Afghanistan	Taliban gunman
2019	13 April	Dmitry Bykov	Prominent Russian opposition figure	Mid-air flight between Yekaterinburg and Ufa	Russia	Likely FSB
2019	July	Alexei Navalny	Prominent Russian opposition figure	Moscow	Russia	Unknown
2019	10 October	Wiranto	Coordinating Minister for Political, Legal, and Security Affairs of Indonesia	Pandeglang Regency	Indonesia	Jamaah Ansharut Daulah
2019	6 November	Junius Ho	Member of Legislative Council of Hong Kong	Tuen Mun	Hong Kong	Unknown
2020	19 February	Cid Gomes	Senator for the state of Ceará	Sobral, Ceará	Brazil	Mutinying police officers
2020	29 February	Juan Guaidó	Disputed president of Venezuela and Speaker of the National Assembly	Barquisimeto	Venezuela	Pro-government colectivos
2020	26 June	Omar García Harfuch	Secretary of Public Security of Mexico City	Mexico City	Mexico	Jalisco New Generation Cartel
2020	6 July	Alexei Navalny	Prominent Russian opposition figure	Kaliningrad	Russia	Likely FSB
2020	6 July	Yulia Navalnaya	Prominent Russian opposition figure, wife of Alexei Navalny	Kaliningrad	Russia	Likely FSB
2020	19 July	Esther Salas	United States federal judge, United States District Court for the District of New Jersey	North Brunswick, New Jersey	USA	Roy Den Hollander
2020	20 August	Alexei Navalny	Prominent Russian opposition figure	Tomsk	Russia	FSB (specifically agents Alexey Alexandrov, Ivan Osipov and Vladimir Panyaev)
2020	25 August	Saba Sahar	Actress and filmmaker	Kabul	Afghanistan	Unknown
2022	14 February	Craig Greenberg	Candidate for mayor of Louisville	Louisville, Kentucky	United States	Quintez Brown
2022	12 August	Salman Rushdie	British-Indian novelist and essayist	Chautauqua, New York	United States	Hadi Matar
2022	1 September	Cristina Fernández de Kirchner	Vice President of Argentina	Buenos Aires	Argentina	Fernando Andrés Sabag Montiel
2022	28 October	Paul Pelosi	American businessman	San Francisco, California	United States	David DePape
2022	3 November	Imran Khan	Former Prime Minister of Pakistan	Wazirabad	Pakistan	Muhammad Naveed
2022	23 November	Friendlyjordies	YouTuber/Journalist	Bondi Beach	Australia	Coronation Property Group (alleged)
2023	14 May	Lúcio Tembé	Tembé leader	Tomé-Açu, Pará	Brazil	Unknown
2023	17 September	Uddika Premarathna	Sri Lankan MP and actor	Anuradhapura	Sri Lanka	Unknown gunmen
2023	23 December	Lucas Aparecido Assumção	Mayor of Palmares Paulista, São Paulo	Palmares Paulista, São Paulo	Brazil	Unnamed
2024	2 January	Lee Jae-myung	South Korean MP and Leader of the Democratic Party of Korea	Gadeokdo, Busan	South Korea	Kim Jin-sung
2024	15 April	Mar Mari Emmanuel	Assyrian Australian prelate and bishop	Wakeley, New South Wales	Australia	Unnamed 16-year-old boy (Note: The name of the assailant has not been disclosed due to the fact that he was a minor.)
2024	13 July	Donald Trump	Former president of the United States and U.S. presidential candidate	Butler, Pennsylvania	United States	Thomas Matthew Crooks
2024	28 August	Ahmed Haitham	Former Member of the People's Majlis of the Maldives	Colombo	Sri Lanka	Unnamed
2024	28 August	Shajaan Muaz Shaheem	Environmental Activist of Maldives	Colombo	Sri Lanka	Unnamed
2024	15 September	Donald Trump	Former president of the United States and U.S. presidential candidate	West Palm Beach, Florida	United States	Ryan Wesley Routh
2025	15 March	Takashi Tachibana	founder and former leader of the NHK Party (NHK党, NHK tō)	Tokyo	Japan	Shion Miyanishi
2025	13 April	Josh Shapiro	Governor of Pennsylvania	Harrisburg, Pennsylvania	United States	Cody Allen Balmer
2025	14 June	John Hoffman	Member of the Minnesota Senate	Champlin, Minnesota	United States	Vance Boelter
2026	6 February	Vladimir Alekseyev	Deputy Director of the GRU	Moscow	Russia	Lyubomir Korba
2026	25 April	Second cabinet of Donald Trump (excluding Kash Patel)	President of the United States	Washington, D.C.	United States	Cole Tomas Allen (suspect)
2026	June 29	Vadym Iermolaiev	Ukrainian oligarch	Monaco	Monaco	Unknown
2026	19 October	Helen Haines	Member of the Australian parliament	Victoria, Australia	Australia	Brendan Nugent (alleged)

== Heads of state and government ==
Date		Article	Intended victim(s)	Title at the time	Place	Country	Perpetrator(s)
354 BC	–		Mausolus	Satrap of Caria and Lycia	Labraunda	Achaemenid Empire	Manitas Paktyо̄ and Thyssos Syskо̄
227 BC	–		Qin Shi Huang	King of Qin	Xianyang	Ancient China (Warring States period)	Jing Ke
Unknown	–		Qin Shi Huang	First Emperor of a unified China	Xianyang	Imperial China (Qin dynasty)	Gao Jianli
218 BC	–		Qin Shi Huang	First Emperor of a unified China	China	Imperial China (Qin dynasty)	Ordered by Zhang Liang (Western Han)
206 BC	–	Feast at Swan Goose Gate	Liu Bang	King of Han	Xianyang	Imperial China (Chu–Han Contention)	Xiang Zhuang
156–5 BC	–		Ptolemy VIII Physcon	Pharaoh of Egypt	Alexandria	Ancient Egypt	Ordered by Ptolemy VI Philometor, his brother
135 BC	–		John Hyrcanus	Crown Prince and High Priest of Israel	Jerusalem	Judea (Hasmonean Dynasty)	Ptolemy son of Abubus collaborating with the Selucid Empire
399 AD	–		Emperor Richū	Crown Prince	Naniwa	Ancient Japan (Kofun period)	Prince Suminoe no Nakatsu (住吉仲皇子) (Younger brother)
626 AD	Mar–Apr		Saint Edwin of Northumbria	King of Deira and Bernicia	York, Northumbria	England	Agents of Cwichelm of Wessex
1298	Dec		Edward I	King of England	Westminster	England	Merchants of Lucca
1323	30 Nov		Edward II	King of England	Coventry	England	John of Nottingham
1330	17 Apr		Charles I	King of Hungary	Visegrád	Hungary	Felician Záh
1400	4 Jan		Henry IV	King of England	Windsor Castle	England	Members of the Epiphany Rising
1401	8 Sep		Henry IV	King of England	Westminster	England	Unknown
1402	–		Yongle Emperor	Emperor of China	Nanjing	Imperial China (Ming dynasty)	Left Censor-in-Chief Jing Qing
1486	23 Apr		Henry VII	King of England	York	England	Francis Lovell, 1st Viscount Lovell
1492	7 December		Ferdinand II of Aragon	King of Aragon	Barcelona	Crown of Aragon	Juan de Cañamares
1542	Nov	Renyin palace plot	Jiajing Emperor	Emperor of China	Beijing	Imperial China (Ming dynasty)	Imperial Concubine Ning, Yang Jinying, and 14 other palace women
1557	Sep		Henry II	King of France	Paris	France	Caboche
1564	Jan		Akbar	Mughal Emperor	Delhi	Mughal Empire	A slave of Mirza Sharfuddin
1571	bef. Apr		Elizabeth I	Queen of England	Westminster	England	Members of the Ridolfi Plot
1583	bef. Nov		Elizabeth I	Queen of England	Westminster	England	Francis Throckmorton
1584	Mar–Nov		Elizabeth I	Queen of England	Westminster	England	William Parry
1586	Jul–Aug		Elizabeth I	Queen of England	Westminster	England	Anthony Babington
1594	27 Dec		Henry IV	King of France	Paris	France	Jean Châtel
1605	5 Nov	Gunpowder Plot	James I	King of England	Westminster	England	Guy Fawkes
1620	15 Nov		Sigismund III Vasa	King of Poland and Grand Duke of Lithuania	Warsaw	Poland	Michał Piekarski
1657	8 Jan		Oliver Cromwell	Lord Protector	London	England	Miles Sindercombe
1696	15–22 Feb	1696 Jacobite assassination plot	William III	King of England	Kew Bridge	England	Ambrose Rookwood
1757	5 Jan		Louis XV	King of France	Versailles	France	Robert-François Damiens
1758	3 Sep		Joseph I	King of Portugal and the Algarves	Ajuda, Lisbon	Portugal	Unclear; possibly the Távora family (see Távora affair)
1800	15 May		George III	King of Britain and Ireland	Westminster	United Kingdom	James Hadfield
1800	24 Dec	Plot of the rue Saint-Nicaise	Napoleon Bonaparte	First Consul of France	Paris	France	François-Joseph Carbon
1809	12 Oct		Napoleon I	Emperor of the French	Schönbrunn	Austrian Empire	Friedrich Staps
1826	3 Nov		Dionisio de Herrera	Head of State of Honduras		Honduras	
1832			Fructuoso Rivera	President of Uruguay		Uruguay	Members of the military supportive of Rivera's rival Juan Antonio Lavalleja
1835	30 Jan	Attempted assassination of Andrew Jackson	Andrew Jackson	President of the United States	Washington, D.C.	United States	Richard Lawrence
1835	28 Jul		Louis Philippe I	King of France	Paris	France	Giuseppe Marco Fieschi
1840	10 Jun		Queen Victoria	Queen of the United Kingdom	London	United Kingdom	Edward Oxford
1842	30 May		Queen Victoria	Queen of the United Kingdom	London	United Kingdom	John Francis
1852	26 Jul		Nasser al-Din Shah	Shahanshah of Persia	Tehran	Persia	Babis
1853	18 Feb		Franz Joseph I	Austria-Hungarian Emperor	Vienna	Austria-Hungary	János Libényi
1858	14 Jan		Napoleon III	Emperor of the French	Paris	France	Felice Orsini
1861	14 Jul		Wilhelm I	King of Prussia	Baden-Baden	Prussia	Oskar Becker
1864	August		Abraham Lincoln	President of the United States	Washington, D.C		Unknown sniper
1866	4 Apr		Alexander II	Emperor of Russia	Saint Petersburg	Russian Empire	Dmitry Karakozov
1866	7 May		Otto von Bismarck	Minister President of Prussia	Berlin	North German Confederation	Ferdinand Cohen-Blind
1873	22 Aug		Domingo Faustino Sarmiento	President of Argentina	Buenos Aires	Argentina	Ricardo López Jordán
1874	13 Jul		Otto von Bismarck	Chancellor of the German Reich	Bad Kissingen	German Empire	Eduard Kullman
1878	11 May	Hödel assassination attempt	Wilhelm I	German Emperor	Berlin	German Empire	Max Hödel
1878	2 Jun	Nobiling assassination attempt	Wilhelm I	German Emperor	Berlin	German Empire	Karl Nobiling
1878	17 Nov		Umberto I	King of Italy	Naples	Italy	Giovanni Passannante
1879	20 Apr		Alexander II	Emperor of Russia	Saint Petersburg	Russian Empire	Alexander Soloviev
1880	5 Feb		Alexander II	Emperor of Russia	Saint Petersburg	Russian Empire	Stephan Khalturin
1882	2 Mar		Queen Victoria	Queen of the United Kingdom	Windsor	United Kingdom	Roderick Maclean
1883	28 Sep		Wilhelm I	German Emperor	Rüdesheim am Rhein	German Empire	August Reinsdorf
1886	Aug		Máximo Santos	President of Uruguay		Uruguay	
1887	13 Jan		Shirley Waldemar Baker	Prime Minister of Tonga	Nukuʻalofa	Tonga	Muʻa conspirators
1889	15 Jul	Attempted assassination of Pedro II of Brazil	Pedro II	Emperor of Brazil	Rio de Janeiro	Empire of Brazil	Adriano Augusto do Valle
1889	18 Oct		Ōkuma Shigenobu	Prime Minister of Japan	Tokyo	Japan	Member of the Genyōsha
1897	22 Apr		Umberto I	King of Italy	Rome	Italy	Pietro Acciarito
1897	16 Sep	Attack against Porfirio Díaz of 1897	Porfirio Díaz	President of Mexico	Alameda Central, Mexico City	Mexico	Arnulfo Arroyo
1897	5 Nov	Attempted assassination of Prudente de Morais	Prudente de Morais	President of Brazil	Rio de Janeiro	Brazil	Lance corporal Marcelino Bispo de Melo
1900	2 Aug		Mozaffar ad-Din Shah Qajar	Shah of Persia	Paris	France	Francois Salson
1900	16 Nov		Wilhelm II	German Emperor	Breslau	German Empire	Selma Schnapka
1901	6 Mar		Wilhelm II	German Emperor	Bremen	German Empire	Johann-Dietrich Weiland
1902	15 Nov		Leopold II	King of the Belgians	Brussels	Belgium	Gennaro Rubino
1905	1 Jun		Émile Loubet	President of France	Paris	France	Unidentified anarchist
1905	1 Jun		Alfonso XIII	King of Spain	Paris	France	Unidentified anarchist
1905	21 Jul	Yıldız assassination attempt	Abdul Hamid II	Sultan of the Ottoman Empire	Constantinople	Ottoman Empire	Armenian Revolutionary Federation
1906	31 May	Morral affair	Alfonso XIII	King of Spain	Madrid	Spain	Mateu Morral
1908	15 Mar		Mohammad Ali Shah Qajar	Shah of Persia	Tehran	Persia	Constitutionalists
1909	16 Oct		William Howard Taft	President of the United States	Ciudad Juárez	Mexico	Crowd member
1912	16 March		Victor Emmanuel III	King of Italy	Rome	Italy	Antonio Dalba
1915	2 Jul		Thomas R. Marshall	Vice President of the United States	His office at U.S. Senate	United States	Eric Muenter
1918	Aug 30	Assassination attempts on Vladimir Lenin	Vladimir Lenin	Chairman of the Council of People's Commissars of the Russian SFSR	Moscow	Russian SFSR	Fanny Kaplan
1918	6 Dec		Sidónio Pais	President of Portugal	Lisbon	Portugal	Luís Maria Baptista
1919	9 Jan		Karel Kramář	Prime Minister of Czechoslovakia	Prague	Czechoslovakia	Alois Josef Šťastný
1919	19 Feb		Georges Clemenceau	Prime Minister of France	Paris	France	Émile Cottin
1921	25 Sep		Józef Piłsudski	Chief of State of Poland	Lviv	Poland	Stepan Fedak
1922	14 Jul	Attempted assassination of Alexandre Millerand	Alexandre Millerand	President of France	Paris	France	Gustave Bouvet
1924	5 Sep		Stanisław Wojciechowski	President of Poland	Lviv	Poland	Teofil Olszansky
1925	4 Nov		Benito Mussolini	Prime Minister of Italy	Rome	Italy	Tito Zaniboni
1926	7 Apr		Benito Mussolini	Prime Minister of Italy	Rome	Italy	Violet Gibson
1926	11 Sep		Benito Mussolini	Prime Minister of Italy	Rome	Italy	Gino Lucetti
1926	31 Oct		Benito Mussolini	Prime Minister of Italy	Bologna	Italy	Anteo Zamboni
1931	20 Feb		Zog I	King of Albania	Vienna	Austria	Ndok Gjeloshi, Aziz Çami
1932	9 Jan		Hirohito	Emperor of Japan	Tokyo	Japan	Lee Bong-chang
1933	Oct		Engelbert Dollfuss	Chancellor of Austria	Vienna	Austria	Rudolf Dertill
1935	2 Jun		Gabriel Terra	President of Uruguay	Montevideo	Uruguay	Bernardo García
1936	26 Feb		Keisuke Okada	Prime Minister of Japan	Tokyo	Japan	Imperial Japanese Army officers
1936	16 Jul		Edward VIII	King of the United Kingdom	London	United Kingdom	George McMahon
1937	4 Jul		António de Oliveira Salazar	Prime Minister of Portugal	São Sebastião da Pedreira, Lisbon	Portugal	Emídio Santana and several anarcho-syndicalist and communist conspirators
1938	9 Nov		Adolf Hitler	German Führer	Munich	Nazi Germany	Maurice Bavaud
1939	8 Nov		Adolf Hitler	German Führer	Munich	Nazi Germany	Georg Elser
1941	17 May		Victor Emmanuel III	King of Italy	Tirana	Albania	Vasil Laçi
1943	13 Mar		Adolf Hitler	German Führer	Wolf's Lair	Nazi Germany	Henning von Tresckow, Fabian von Schlabrendorff, Rudolf Christoph Freiherr von Gersdorff
1944	20 Jul	20 July plot	Adolf Hitler	German Führer	Wolf's Lair	Nazi Germany	Claus von Stauffenberg
1947	10 Mar		Manuel Roxas	President of the Philippines	Manila	Philippines	Julio Guillen
1949	4 Feb		Mohammad Reza Shah Pahlavi	Shah of Iran	Tehran	Iran	Nasser Fakhraraei
1950	1 Nov	Attempted assassination of Harry S. Truman	Harry Truman	President of the United States	Washington, D.C.	United States	Oscar Collazo and Griselio Torresola (FALN)
1952	27 Mar	Attempted assassination of Konrad Adenauer	Konrad Adenauer	Chancellor of the Federal Republic of Germany	Munich	West Germany	Herut
1954	26 Oct	Attempted assassination of Gamal Abdel Nasser	Gamal Abdel Nasser	President of Egypt	Alexandria	Egypt	Mohammed Abdel Latif
1954	27 Oct		Ismail al-Azhari	Prime Minister of Sudan	Malakal	Sudan	Southern official
1955	12 Mar		Jawaharlal Nehru	Prime Minister of India	Nagpur	India	Baburao Laxman Kochale
1955	11 Apr		Zhou Enlai	Chinese Premier	Hong Kong	British Hong Kong	Kuomintang agents
1957	22 Feb		Ngô Đình Diệm	President of the Republic of Vietnam	Buôn Ma Thuột	South Vietnam	Hà Minh Tri
1957	30 Nov	Cikini Incident	Sukarno	President of Indonesia	Jakarta	Indonesia	Darul Islam/Tentara Islam Indonesia
1959	15 Jul		Nikita Khrushchev and Władysław Gomułka	General Secretary of the Soviet Union and First Secretary of the Polish United Workers' Party	Sosnowiec	Poland	Stanisław Jaros
1960	9 Mar	Maukar Incident	Sukarno	President of Indonesia	Jakarta	Indonesia	Manguni Group, Permesta
1960	9 Apr		Hendrik Verwoerd	Prime Minister of South Africa	Johannesburg	South Africa	David Pratt
1960	24 Jun	Attempted assassination of Rómulo Betancourt	Rómulo Betancourt	President of Venezuela	Caracas	Venezuela	Ordered by Dominican Republic President Rafael Leonidas Trujillo
1960	14 Jul		Nobusuke Kishi	Prime Minister of Japan		Japan	Taisuke Aramaki
1962	27 Feb		Ngô Đình Diệm	President of the Republic of Vietnam	Saigon	South Vietnam	Nguyễn Văn Cử and Phạm Phú Quốc
1962	14 May		Sukarno	President of Indonesia	Jakarta	Indonesia	Darul Islam/Tentara Islam Indonesia
1962	22 Aug	Petit-Clamart attack	Charles de Gaulle	President of France	Petit-Clamart	France	Jean Bastien-Thiry
1964	21 Feb		İsmet İnönü	Prime Minister of Turkey	Ankara	Turkey	Mesut Suna
1964	11 Aug		Francisco Franco	Generalissimo Caudillo of Spain	Madrid	Francoist Spain	Stuart Christie
1965	12 Apr		Mohammad Reza Shah Pahlavi	Shah of Iran	Tehran	Iran	Reza Shamsabadi
1968	21 Jan	Blue House raid	Park Chung Hee	President of South Korea	Seoul	South Korea	North Korean commandos
1968	13 Aug		Georgios Papadopoulos	President of Greece	Between Lagonisi and Athens	Greece	Alexandros Panagoulis
1969	22 Jan	Attempted assassination of Leonid Brezhnev	Leonid Brezhnev	General Secretary of the CPSU	Moscow	Soviet Union	Viktor Ilyin
1970	27 Nov		Pope Paul VI	Bishop of Rome	Manila	Philippines	Benjamín Mendoza y Amor Flores
1970	1 Sep		Hussein I	King of Jordan	Amman	Jordan	Popular Front for the Liberation of Palestine
1971	10 Jul	1971 Moroccan coup attempt	Hassan II	King of Morocco	Skhirat	Morocco	M'hamed Ababou and Mohamed Medbouh
1971	13 Sep	Lin Biao incident	Mao Zedong	Chairman of the Chinese Communist Party	China	China	Lin Biao (alleged)
1972	16 Aug	1972 Moroccan coup attempt	Hassan II	King of Morocco	Kenitra	Morocco	Mohamed Amekrane
1973	14 Jan		Golda Meir	Prime Minister of Israel	Rome	Italy	Black September Organization
1973	4 Mar		Golda Meir	Prime Minister of Israel	New York City	United States	Black September Organization
1974	15 Aug		Park Chung-hee	President of South Korea	Seoul	South Korea	Mun Se-gwang
1974	22 Feb		Richard Nixon	President of the United States	Baltimore/Washington International Airport	United States	Samuel Byck
1975	5 Sep	Attempted assassination of Gerald Ford in Sacramento	Gerald Ford	President of the United States	Sacramento	United States	Lynette "Squeaky" Fromme
1975	22 Sep	Attempted assassination of Gerald Ford in San Francisco	Gerald Ford	President of the United States	San Francisco	United States	Sara Jane Moore
1976	Feb		Jean-Bédel Bokassa	President of the Central African Republic	Bangui M'Poko International Airport	Central African Republic	Unknown
1977	18 Feb		Jorge Rafael Videla	President of Argentina	Aeroparque Jorge Newbery	Argentina	Ejercito Revolucionario del Pueblo
1977	22 Sep		Bhumibol Adulyadej	King of Thailand	Yala	Thailand	Patani United Liberation Organisation
1980	26 June	Attempted assassination of Hafez al-Assad	Hafez al-Assad	President of Syria	Damascus	Syria	Muslim Brotherhood
1981	30 Mar	Attempted assassination of Ronald Reagan	Ronald Reagan	President of the United States	Washington, D.C.	United States	John Hinckley Jr.
1981	13 May	Attempted assassination of Pope John Paul II	Pope John Paul II	Bishop of Rome	St. Peter's Square	Vatican City State	Mehmet Ali Ağca
1981	13 Jun		Elizabeth II	Queen of the United Kingdom	London	United Kingdom	Marcus Sarjeant
1982	12 May		Pope John Paul II	Bishop of Rome	Fátima	Portugal	Juan María Fernández y Krohn
1982	8 Jul		Saddam Hussein	President of Iraq	Dujail	Iraq	Islamic Dawa Party
1983	19 Oct		Chun Doo-hwan	President of South Korea	Rangoon	Burma	North Korean agents
1984	12 Oct	Brighton hotel bombing	Margaret Thatcher	Prime Minister of the United Kingdom	Brighton	United Kingdom	Irish Republican Army
1986	7 Sep	Attempted assassination of Augusto Pinochet	Augusto Pinochet	President of Chile	Cajón del Maipo	Chile	Manuel Rodríguez Patriotic Front
1986	3 Oct		Rajiv Gandhi	Prime Minister of India	New Delhi	India	Karamjit Singh
1987	18 Jun		Turgut Özal	President of Turkey	Ankara	Turkey	Kartal Demirağ
1987	30 Jul		Rajiv Gandhi	Prime Minister of India	Colombo	Sri Lanka	Vijitha Rohana
1987	18 Aug	1987 grenade attack in the Sri Lankan Parliament	Junius Richard Jayewardene	President of Sri Lanka	Colombo	Sri Lanka	Janatha Vimukthi Peramuna
1987	18 Aug	1987 grenade attack in the Sri Lankan Parliament	Ranasinghe Premadasa	Prime Minister of Sri Lanka	Colombo	Sri Lanka	Janatha Vimukthi Peramuna
1988	3 Nov	1988 Maldives coup attempt	Maumoon Abdul Gayoom	President of the Maldives	Malé	Maldives	People's Liberation Organisation of Tamil Eelam; Abdullah Luthufi; Ahmed Nasir; Ahmed Ismail Manik
1990	27 Jul		A. N. R. Robinson	Prime Minister of Trinidad and Tobago	Port of Spain	Trinidad and Tobago	Jamaat al Muslimeen rebels
1990	7 Nov	Attempted assassination of Mikhail Gorbachev	Mikhail Gorbachev	President of the Soviet Union	Moscow	Soviet Union	Alexander Shmonov
1991	7 Feb	Downing Street mortar attack	John Major	Prime Minister of the United Kingdom	London	United Kingdom	Irish Republican Army
1993	27 Jan		Boris Yeltsin	President of Russia	Moscow	Russia	Ivan Kislov
1993	Nov		Atef Sedki	Prime Minister of Egypt	Cairo	Egypt	Vanguards of Conquest
1994	26 Jan		Prince Charles	Prince of Wales	Tumbalong Park, Darling Harbour in Sydney	Australia	David Kang
1994	29 Oct	Attempted assassination of Bill Clinton	Bill Clinton	President of the United States	Washington, D.C.	United States	Francisco Martin Duran
1995	25 Jun		Hosni Mubarak	President of Egypt	Addis Ababa	Ethiopia	National Islamic Front
1995	29 Aug		Eduard Shevardnadze	President of Georgia	Tbilisi	Georgia	Mkhedrioni rebels
1995	3 Oct		Kiro Gligorov	President of the Republic of Macedonia	Skopje	Republic of Macedonia	Unknown
1995	5 Nov		Jean Chrétien	Prime Minister of Canada	Ottawa	Canada	André Dallaire
1996	Feb		Muammar Gaddafi	Libyan leader	Sirte	Libya	Islamic extremists
1996	17 Jul		Pavlo Lazarenko	Prime Minister of Ukraine	Kyiv	Ukraine	Unknown
1998	9 Feb		Eduard Shevardnadze	President of Georgia	Tbilisi	Georgia	Anti-government forces
1998	12 Jun		Muammar Gaddafi	Libyan Revolutionary leader	Derna	Libya	Islamic militants
1999	18 Dec	Attempted assassination of Chandrika Kumaratunga	Chandrika Kumaratunga	President of Sri Lanka	Colombo	Sri Lanka	Liberation Tigers of Tamil Eelam
2000	24 Feb		Vladimir Putin	Acting President of Russia	Saint Petersburg	Russia	Chechen mafia
2000	18 Aug		Vladimir Putin	President of Russia	Yalta	Ukraine	Unknown
2001	9 Jan		Vladimir Putin	President of Russia	Baku	Azerbaijan	Kyanan Rostam
2001	7 Feb		George W. Bush	President of the United States	Washington, D.C.	United States	Robert W. Pickett
2001	16 Oct		Vladimir Putin	President of Russia		Iran	Unknown
2002	6 Feb		Vladimir Putin	President of Russia	Moscow	Russia	Ivan Zaytsev
2002	14 Jul		Jacques Chirac	President of France	Paris	France	Maxime Brunerie
2002	5 Sep		Hamid Karzai	President of Afghanistan	Kandahar	Afghanistan	Lone gunman
2003	25 Dec		Pervez Musharraf	President of Pakistan	Rawalpindi	Pakistan	Ordered by Amjad Farooqi
2004	19 Mar	March 19 shooting incident	Chen Shui-bian Annette Lu	President of the Republic of China Vice President of the Republic of China	Tainan	Taiwan	Chen Yi-hsiung
2004	11 June		José Manuel Durão Barroso	Prime Minister of Portugal	Porto	Portugal	Nouredine el Fahtni
2004	29 Jul		Shaukat Aziz	Prime Minister of Pakistan	Fateh Jang	Pakistan	Al-Qaeda sympathizers
2004	21 Aug		Sheikh Hasina	Prime Minister of Bangladesh	Dhaka	Bangladesh	Harkat-ul-Jihad al-Islami
2005	15 Mar		Ibrahim Rugova	President of Kosovo	Pristina	Kosovo	Unknown
2005	10 May		Mikheil Saakashvili	President of Georgia	Tbilisi	Georgia	Vladimir Arutyunian
2005	10 May		George W. Bush	President of the United States	Tbilisi	Georgia	Vladimir Arutyunian
2006	18 Sep		Abdullahi Yusuf Ahmed	President of Somalia	Baidoa	Somalia	Islamic Courts Union (blamed)
2007	29 Jun		Guillaume Soro	Prime Minister of Ivory Coast	Bouaké	Ivory Coast	Unknown
2007	6 Jul		Pervez Musharraf	President of Pakistan	Rawalpindi	Pakistan	Taliban
2007	Oct		Vladimir Putin	President of Russia	Tehran	Iran	Unknown
2008	8 Jan		Maumoon Abdul Gayoom	President of the Maldives	Hoarafushi	Maldives	Mohamed Murshid
2008	15 Mar		Vladimir Putin	President of Russia	Moscow	Russia	Shakhvelad Osmanov
2008	11 Feb		José Ramos-Horta	President of Timor-Leste	Dili	East Timor	Alfredo Reinado
2008	11 Feb		Xanana Gusmão	Prime Minister of Timor-Leste	Dili	East Timor	Alfredo Reinado
2009	30 Apr	2009 attack on the Dutch royal family	Queen Beatrix, Prince Willem-Alexander, and other members of the Dutch royal family	Queen of the Netherlands	Apeldoorn	Netherlands	Karst Tates
2009	19 Aug		Vladimir Putin	Prime Minister of Russia	Moscow	Russia	Unknown
2009	3 Dec		Moussa Dadis Camara	President of Guinea	Conakry	Guinea	Lt. Abubakar Diakite
2011	3 Jun		Ali Abdullah Saleh	President of Yemen	Sanaa	Yemen	Unknown
2011	19 Jul		Alpha Condé	President of Guinea	Conakry	Guinea	Republic of Guinea Armed Forces officers
2012			Vladimir Putin	Prime Minister of Russia	Moscow	Russia	Dokka Umarov (alleged)
2013	Apr		Barack Obama	President of the United States	Washington, D.C.	United States	James Everett Dutschke
2017	Nov		Theresa May	Prime Minister of the United Kingdom	London	United Kingdom	Naa'imur Zakariyah Rahman
2018	Jan		Benjamin Netanyahu	Prime Minister of Israel	Jerusalem	Israel	Muhammad Jamal Rashdeh, Popular Front for the Liberation of Palestine
2018	23 Jun	2018 Bulawayo bombing	Emmerson Mnangagwa	President of Zimbabwe	Bulawayo	Zimbabwe	Unknown
2018	4 Aug	2018 Caracas drone attack	Nicolás Maduro	President of Venezuela	Caracas	Venezuela	Uncertain (claimed by Soldados de Franelas)
2020	29 Feb	2020 Barquisimeto shooting	Juan Guaidó	Disputed President of Venezuela	Barquisimeto	Venezuela	Pro-government colectivos
2020	9 Mar		Abdalla Hamdok	Prime Minister of Sudan	Khartoum	Sudan	Unknown
2020	2 Jul		Justin Trudeau	Prime Minister of Canada	Ottawa	Canada	Corey Barclay Hurren
2021	20 Jul		Assimi Goïta	President of Mali	Bamako	Mali	Unknown
2021	7 Nov	Attempted assassination of Mustafa Al-Kadhimi	Mustafa Al-Kadhimi	Prime Minister of Iraq	Baghdad	Iraq	Unknown
2022	10 Feb		Abdul Hamid Dbeibeh	Prime Minister of Libya	Tripoli	Libya	Unknown
2022	26 Feb	Assassination attempts on Volodymyr Zelenskyy	Volodymyr Zelenskyy	President of Ukraine	Kyiv	Ukraine	Chechen mercenaries
2022	Feb	Assassination attempts on Volodymyr Zelenskyy	Volodymyr Zelenskyy	President of Ukraine	Kyiv	Ukraine	Kadyrovites
2022	Feb	Assassination attempts on Volodymyr Zelenskyy	Volodymyr Zelenskyy	President of Ukraine	Kyiv	Ukraine	Redut
2022	Feb	Assassination attempts on Volodymyr Zelenskyy	Volodymyr Zelenskyy	President of Ukraine	Kyiv	Ukraine	Wagner Group
2023	15 Apr	Attempted assassination of Fumio Kishida	Fumio Kishida	Prime Minister of Japan	Wakayama	Japan	Ryūji Kimura
2023	3 May	Kremlin drone attack	Vladimir Putin (Russian claim)	President of Russia	Moscow	Russia	Disputed
2024	15 May	Attempted assassination of Robert Fico	Robert Fico	Prime Minister of Slovakia	Handlová	Slovakia	Juraj Cintula
2024	30 July	Attempted assassination of Abdel Fattah al-Burhan	Abdel Fattah al-Burhan	Chairman of the Transitional Sovereignty Council	Jubayt	Sudan	Unknown
2024	13 September		Azali Assoumani	President of the Comoros	Salimani	Comoros	Ahmed Abdou
2024	19 October	2024 drone attack on Benjamin Netanyahu's residence	Benjamin Netanyahu	Prime Minister of Israel	Caesarea	Israel	Hezbollah, Iran (alleged)
2025	18 March	Attempted assassination of Hassan Sheikh Mohamud	Hassan Sheikh Mohamud	President of Somalia	Mogadishu	Somalia	Al-Shabaab (claimed)
2025	30 September		Daniel Noboa	President of Ecuador	Cotacachi	Ecuador	Unknown
2025	7 October		Daniel Noboa	President of Ecuador	Cañar	Ecuador	Unknown
2026	25 April	2026 White House Correspondents' Dinner shooting	Donald Trump	President of the United States	Washington, D.C.	United States	Cole Tomas Allen (suspect)

== Gallery ==
Gallery

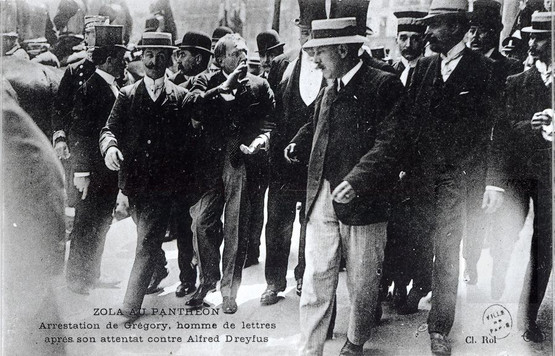
Arrest of Louis Gregori, the attempted assassin of Captain Alfred Dreyfus during the ceremony removing Émile Zola's ashes to the Panthéon from the Cimetière de Montmartre in Paris, 4 June 1908

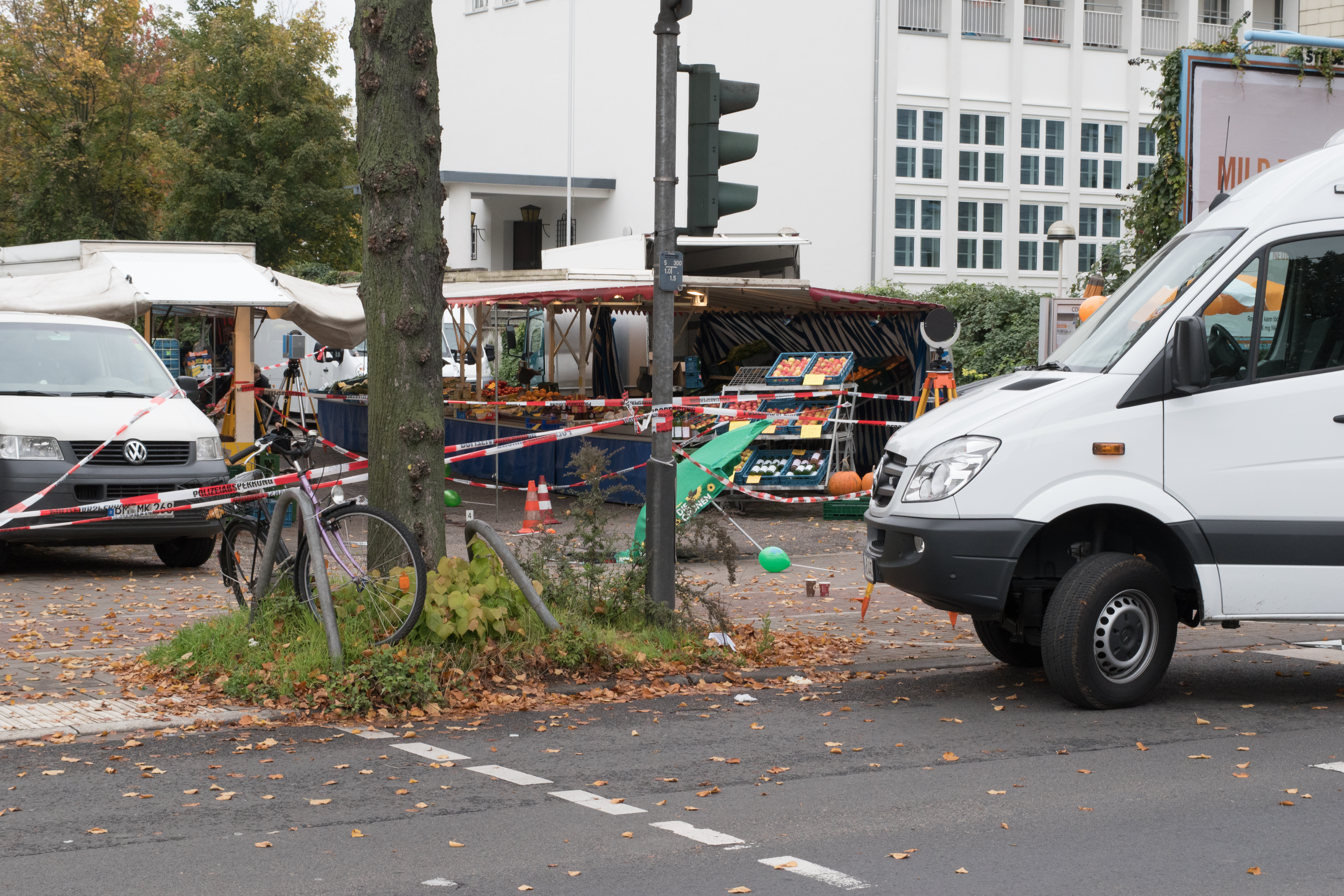
Crime scene of the attack on Mayor of Cologne Henriette Reker in Cologne on 17 October 2015

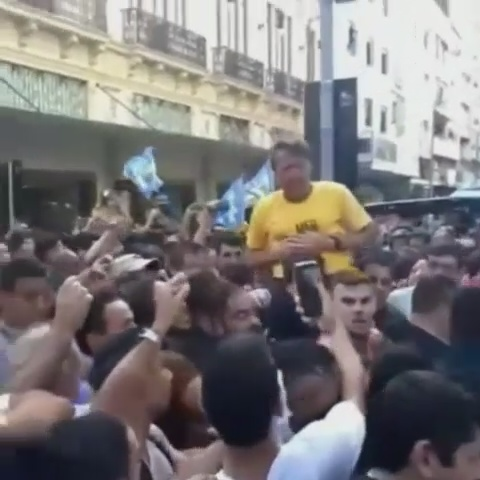
Federal deputy and Brazilian presidential candidate Jair Bolsonaro after being stabbed by Adélio Bispo de Oliveira during a campaign event on 6 September 2018

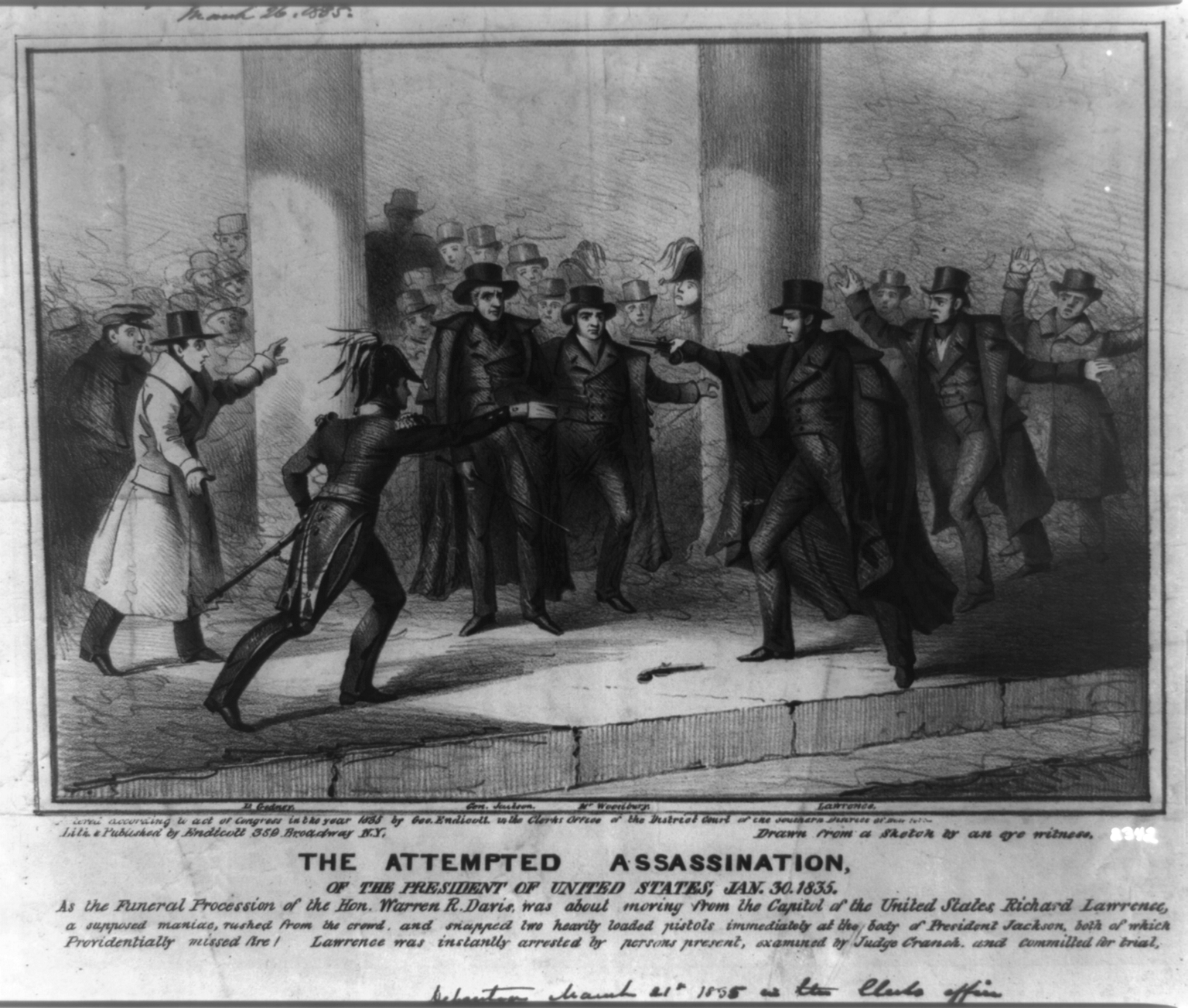
Assassination attempt of the U.S. President Andrew Jackson outside the United States Capitol in Washington, D.C., 30 January 1835

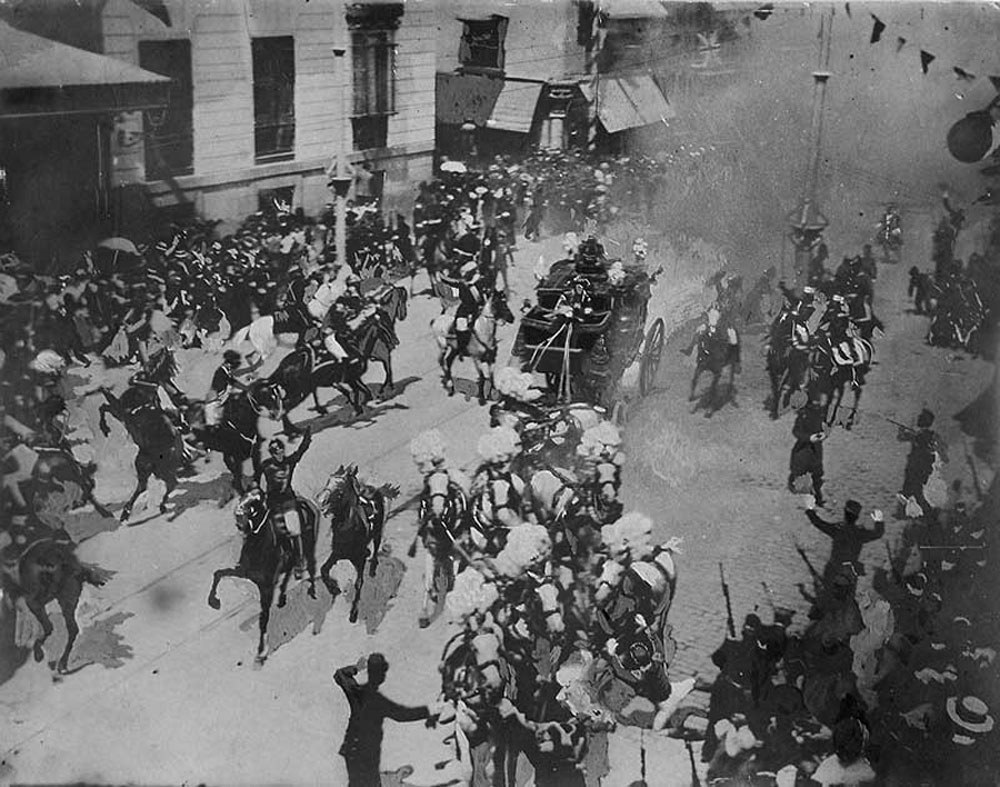
Assassination attempt of King of Spain Alfonso XIII in Madrid, 31 May 1906

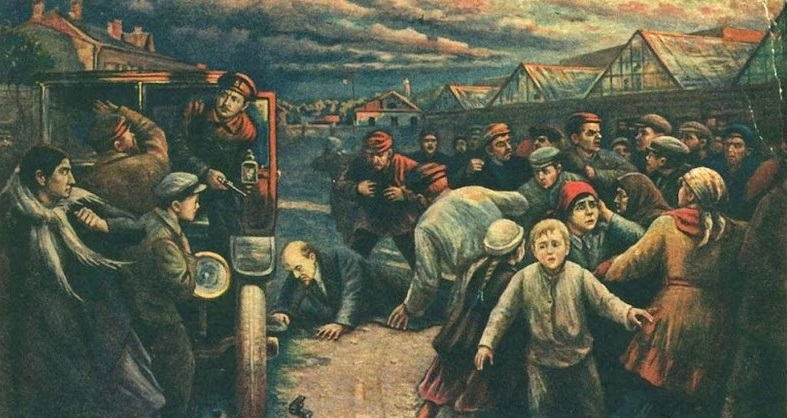
Assassination attempt of Russian Revolutionary Vladimir Lenin in Moscow, Aug 30 1918

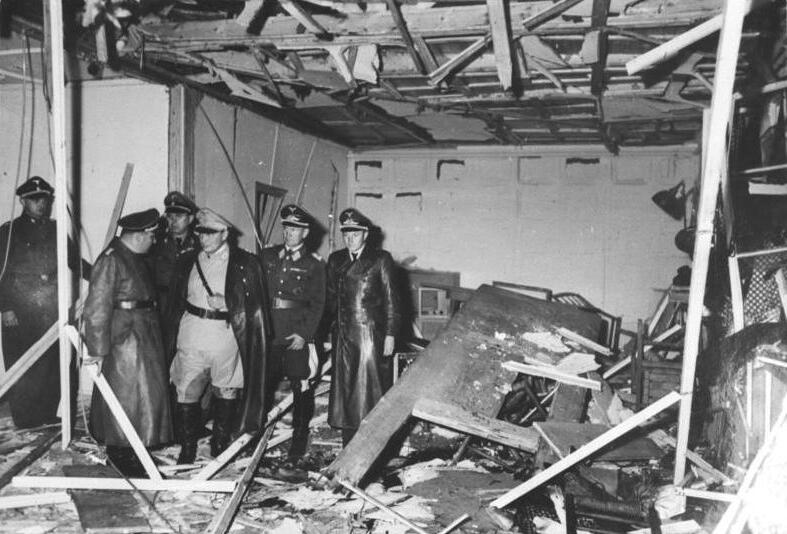
Wolf's Lair conference room after the failed assassination attempt on Adolf Hitler, 20 July 1944

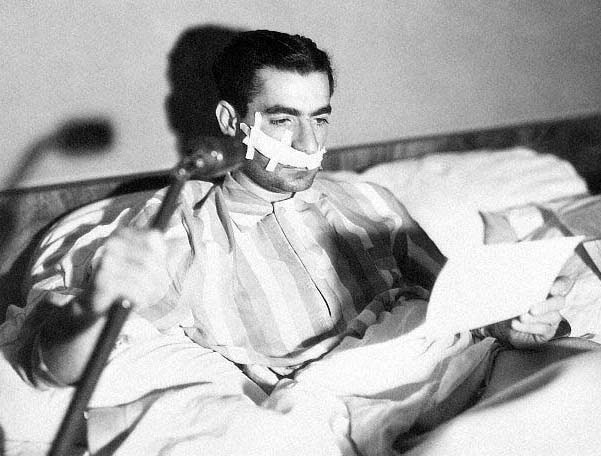
Iranian Shah Mohammad Reza Shah in hospital after the failed assassination attempt by Fada'iyan-e Islam in 1949

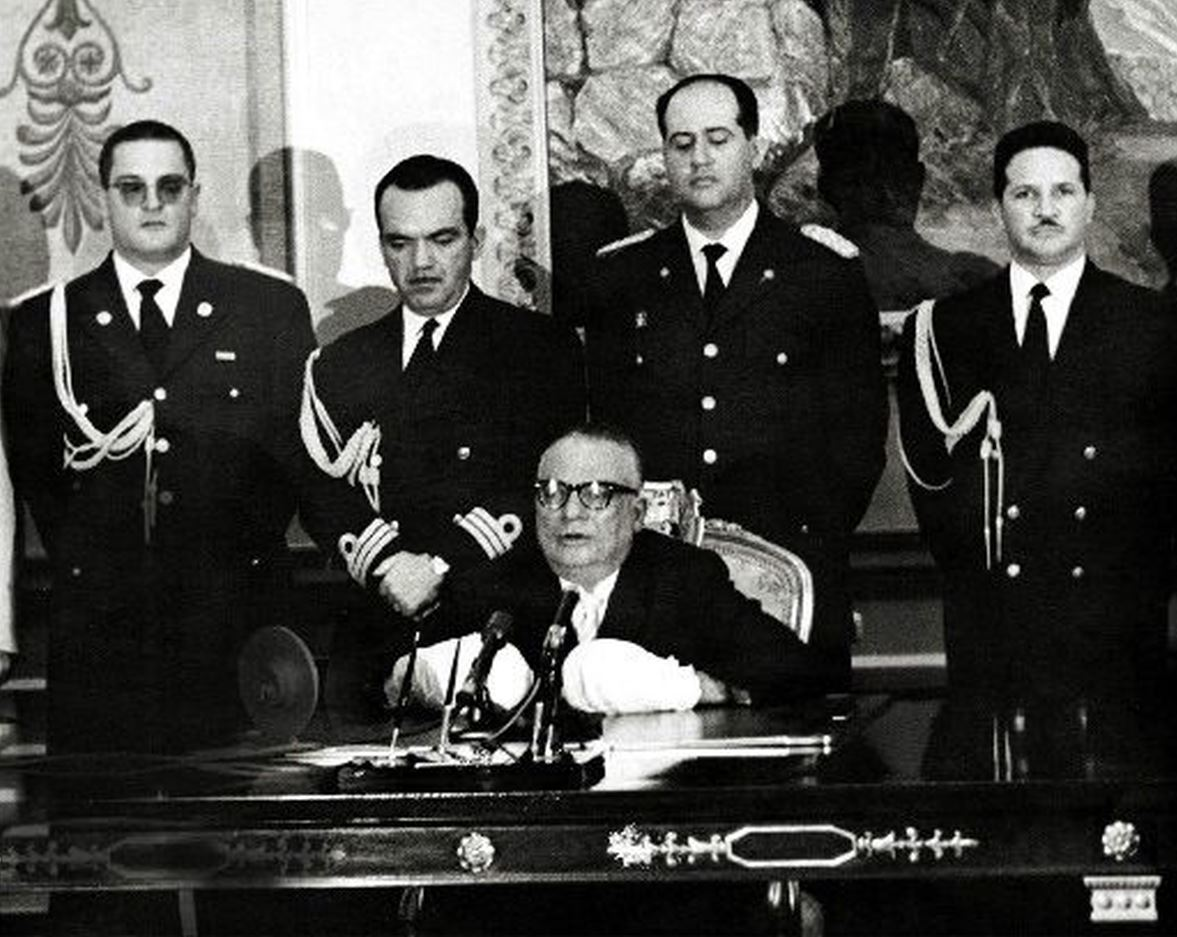
Venezuelan President Rómulo Betancourt delivers a speech with bandaged hands the day after the assassination attempt against him with a car bomb, planned by Dominican dictator Rafael Leónidas Trujillo, 25 June 1960.

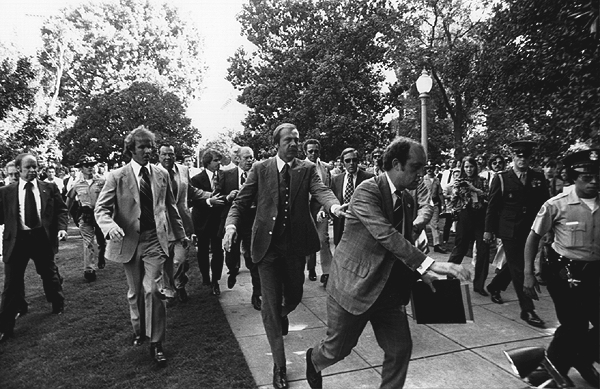
Assassination attempt of the U.S. President Gerald Ford outside the California State Capitol in Sacramento, 5 September 1975

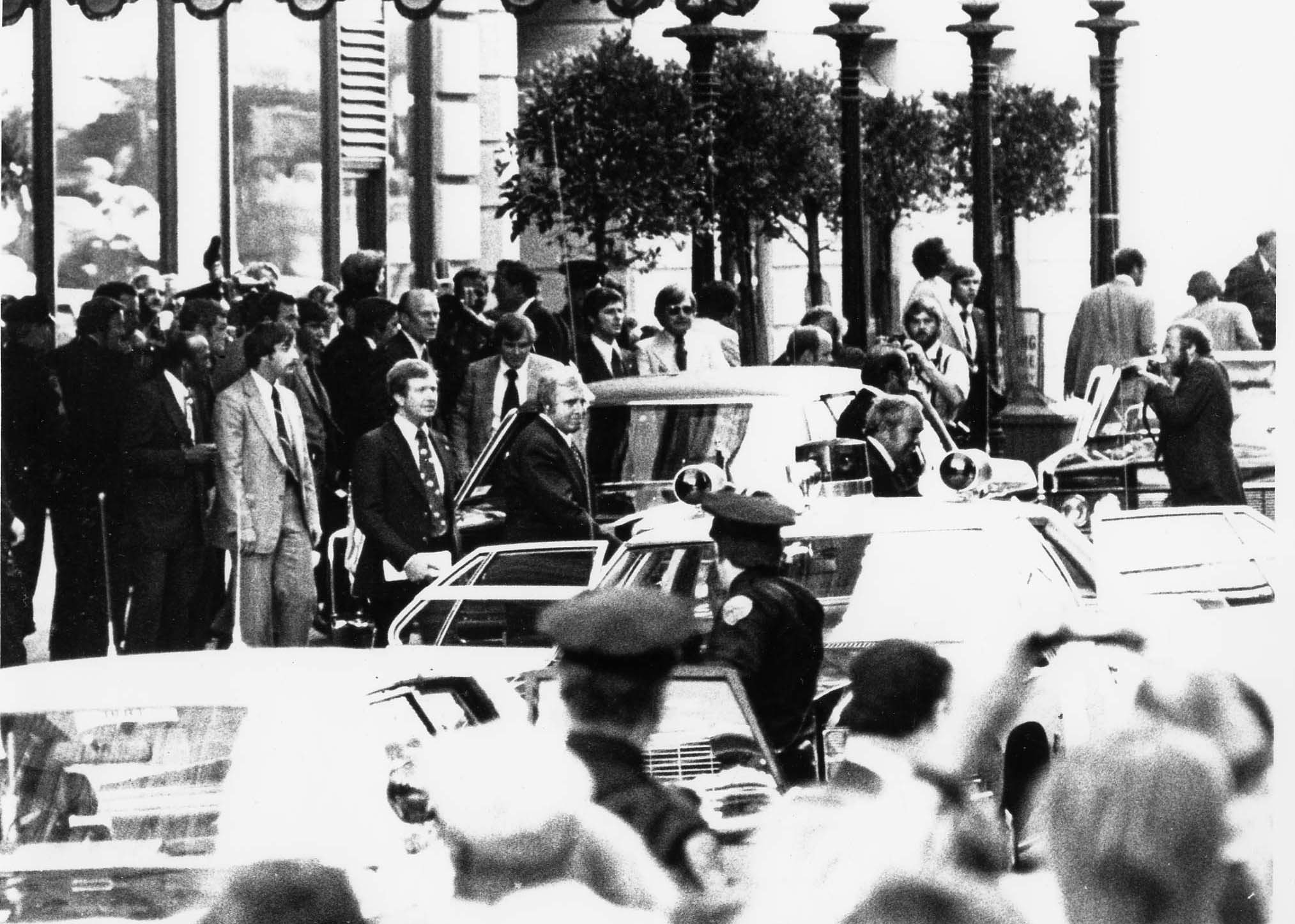
Assassination attempt of the U.S. President Gerald Ford in San Francisco, 22 September 1975

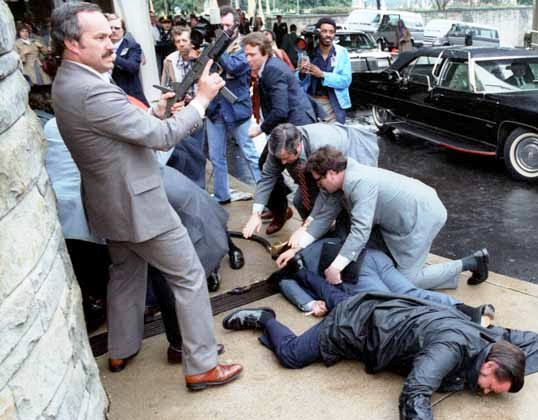
Assassination attempt of the U.S. President Ronald Reagan outside the Washington Hilton Hotel, 30 March 1981

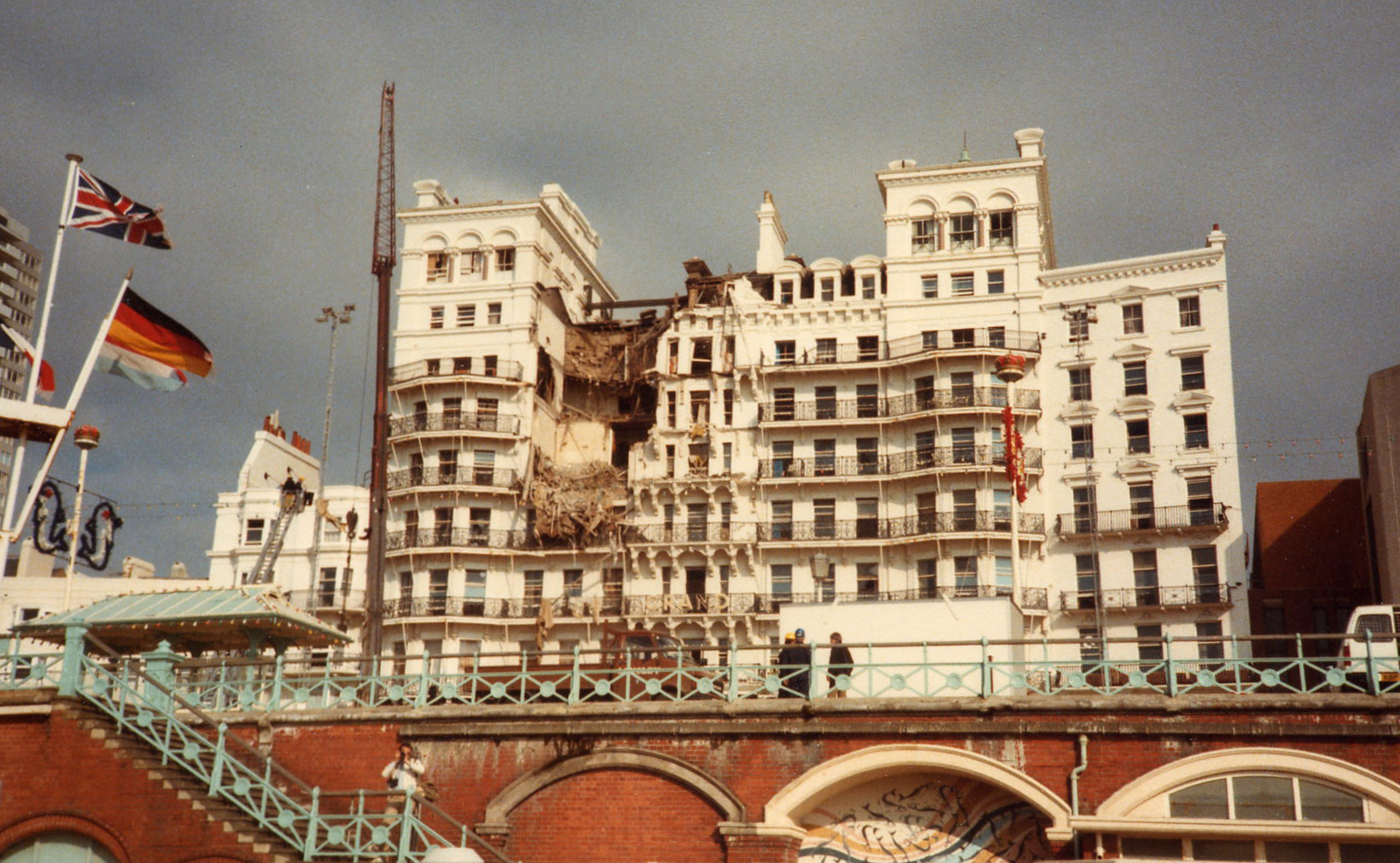
Brighton Grand Hotel after the bomb attack to attempt to assassinate British Prime Minister Margaret Thatcher, 12 October 1984

== See also ==
- List of assassinations
- List of assassination attempts on prime ministers of India
- List of United States presidential assassination attempts and plots
