= Attempted killing =

Attempted killing can refer to:

- Suicide attempt
- Assassination attempt
