= Attempted assassination of N. Chandrababu Naidu =

2003 bomb blast in Alipiri, Andhra Pradesh, India

Coordinates: 13°38′49.46″N 79°24′21.3″E

- Location: Alipiri, Tirupati, Andhra Pradesh, India
- Date: October 1, 2003; 23 years ago 2:27 p.m.
- Target: N. Chandrababu Naidu
- Perpetrator: People's War Group
- Motive: Attempt to eliminate

The attempted assassination of N. Chandrababu Naidu, also referred to as the 2003 Alipiri Bomb Blast, occurred on 1 October 2003 near Alipiri on the Tirumala ghat roads in Andhra Pradesh, India. Naidu, the Chief Minister of Andhra Pradesh was travelling by convoy to the Sri Venkateswara Temple when multiple land mines exploded. The attack was linked to the Naxalite–Maoist insurgency. There were no fatalities.

== Background ==
In the early 2000s, left-wing extremist groups including the People's War Group (PWG), a Maoist organisation, were active in Andhra Pradesh, making violent attacks on police officers and political leaders. Naidu had opposed the PWG with bans and with increased policing and security measures.

== Attack ==
The landmine attack on Naidu occurred as he was travelling by convoy to the Tirumala Venkateswara Temple to offer silk clothes (pattu vastralu) as part of a religious visit. Naidu sustained a fractured collar bone and minor injuries. Other injured members of the Naidu's convoy included Minister Bojjala Gopala Krishna Reddy, Chadalawada Krishnamurthy, MLA for Tirupati, and R. Rajasekhar Reddy, MLA for Puttur, who was critically injured.

== Investigation ==
The Special Investigation Team (SIT) under Chief D. T. Nayak investigated the attack.

The attack, which the PWG called the Alpiri Mission, was made with a series of Claymore directional anti-personnel mines placed along the roads to the temple. The mines were loaded with 200 kg of Nobel gel-90 explosive.

Investigators reported that the PWG's expenditure on the attack was 12 lakh (₹1,200,000) (approximately US$12,000). A recovered floppy disc contained sketches and technical details about the placement of the mines. The words "Sri Sai Private Limited" were written at the end of each document.

The former Uttar Pradesh Director General of Police, Prakash Singh, was tasked with convening a commission of enquiry to determine any lapses of security connected with the attack. The commission focussed on Naidu's Z+ personal protection service. The commission found that the service had failed to conduct adequate anti-sabotage activities along the route despite intelligence reports of threat.

== Arrests and prosecutions ==
In December 2003, the STI identified suspects in the attack. They included Takkelapalli Vasudeva Rao (alias Ashanna), Patel Sudhakar Reddy (alias Suryam), K. Madhavi and Dubashi Shankar, among others. Some of the accused were linked to the murder of Alimineti Madhava Reddy, the Andhra Pradesh Minister of Home Affairs, and the Indian Police Service officer, C. Umesh Chandra.

On 29 October 2010, 4 suspects, Ramaswamy Reddy, Nagarjuna, Panduranga Reddy (alias Sagar), and Kollam Gangi Reddy were convicted, fined and sentenced to 7 years with hard labour. Panduranga Reddy and Gangi Reddy were later acquitted on appeal.

At a second trial, on 26 September 2014, G. Ramamohan Reddy (alias Teja), S. Narasimha Reddy (alias Rajasekhar), and P. Chandra (alias Kesava) were convicted, fined and sentenced to 4 years imprisonment with hard labour. These men were acquitted on appeal on 16 December 2023 at the Tirupati district court.
