= Attempted assassination of Konrad Adenauer =

1952 assassination attempt made upon Konrad Adenauer

An assassination attempt using a letter bomb was made in 1952 on West German chancellor Konrad Adenauer by former members of the Irgun, an Israeli Zionist militia, over the controversial Holocaust reparations Germany agreed to pay Israel. The attempt was unsuccessful, as Adenauer was not hurt. It was allegedly approved and funded by former Irgun leader and future Israeli prime minister Menachem Begin.

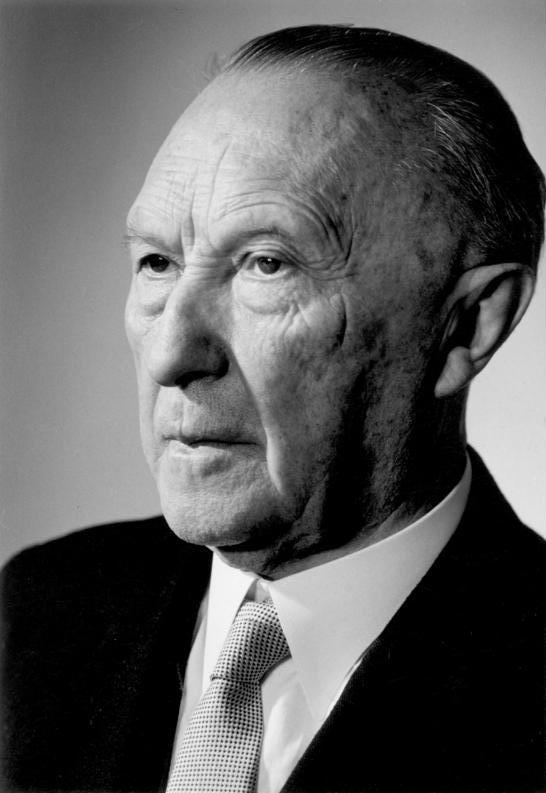
Adenauer in 1952

== Background ==
Negotiations between West Germany and Israel over the Holocaust took place in the 1950s. At the time, Israel was a recently established country which did not have particularly close relations with the West, and its economy was struggling as it had to accommodate hundreds of thousands of Jewish settlers. An agreement was eventually reached and signed in September 1952, much to the chagrin of Israeli hardliners, who believed it was unacceptable for Germany's responsibility for the Holocaust to be washed away with money.

== Plot ==
On 27 March 1952, a package containing a bomb hidden in an encyclopedia was to be delivered to the Palais Schaumburg, Adenauer's official residency in Bonn. One of the would-be assassins outsourced the task to two teenagers in Munich, asking them to take it to the post office. Instead, they took it to the Munich police headquarters, whereupon the bomb detonated and killed a disposal expert named Karl Reichert.

== Aftermath ==
In April, French police arrested five Israeli nationals in connection with the assassination attempt. Nothing could be proven against four of them, and Elieser Sudit, who was found to be in possession of the weapons used in the attempt, was the only perpetrator to be convicted for their role in the conspiracy. He was sentenced to four months in prison and was then deported.

== Menachem Begin's involvement ==
Sudit alleged in their memoir that future Israeli prime minister Menachem Begin had been involved in the plot, having approved and even financed it with his personal money.

I remember that at the beginning of the meeting Begin said that something had to be done against Adenauer and the reparations. I didn't know even who Adenauer was, but I agreed with Begin that this agreement should not be accepted

— Elieser Sudit

The claims were corroborated by Henning Sietz, an author who wrote a book in 2003 about the attempt. He told The Guardian;

Begin approved the assassination attempt. He obtained the money. He even took part in the planning right up until the last minute. Without him it wouldn't have happened.

At the time, Begin was a member of the Knesset and led the Herut party. He had previously been the leader of the Irgun, a Zionist terrorist organization, and was vociferously opposed to the reparations, claiming in a speech that all Germans were responsible for the Holocaust. He found the mere idea of financial reparations to the Israeli government rather than the victims themselves for the murder of six million Jews to be grotesque, and although he was aware that the attempt was unlikely to succeed, he supported it in the belief that it would at least demonstrate the degree to which his party was opposed to the reparations, saying that it would "shake the conscience of the world". Begin's role was not known until after his death, and did not receive widespread media attention before Sietz's 2003 book.

== See also ==
- Attempted assassination of Leonid Brezhnev
