= Attempted assassination of Mikhail Gorbachev =

1990 shooting in Moscow, USSR

On 7 November 1990, Aleksandr Shmonov attempted to assassinate Soviet leader Mikhail Gorbachev during the 1990 October Revolution Parade in Moscow. Shmonov, a dissident who was angry at Gorbachev's handling of democratic reforms, attempted to fire two bullets at Gorbachev but was spotted and overpowered by the police. Shmonov was declared insane and sent to a psikhushka until his release in 1995.

It was the first direct assassination attempt of a Soviet leader since the attempted assassination of Leonid Brezhnev in 1969, and the last before the dissolution of the Soviet Union a year later.

== Background ==
=== Gorbachev ===
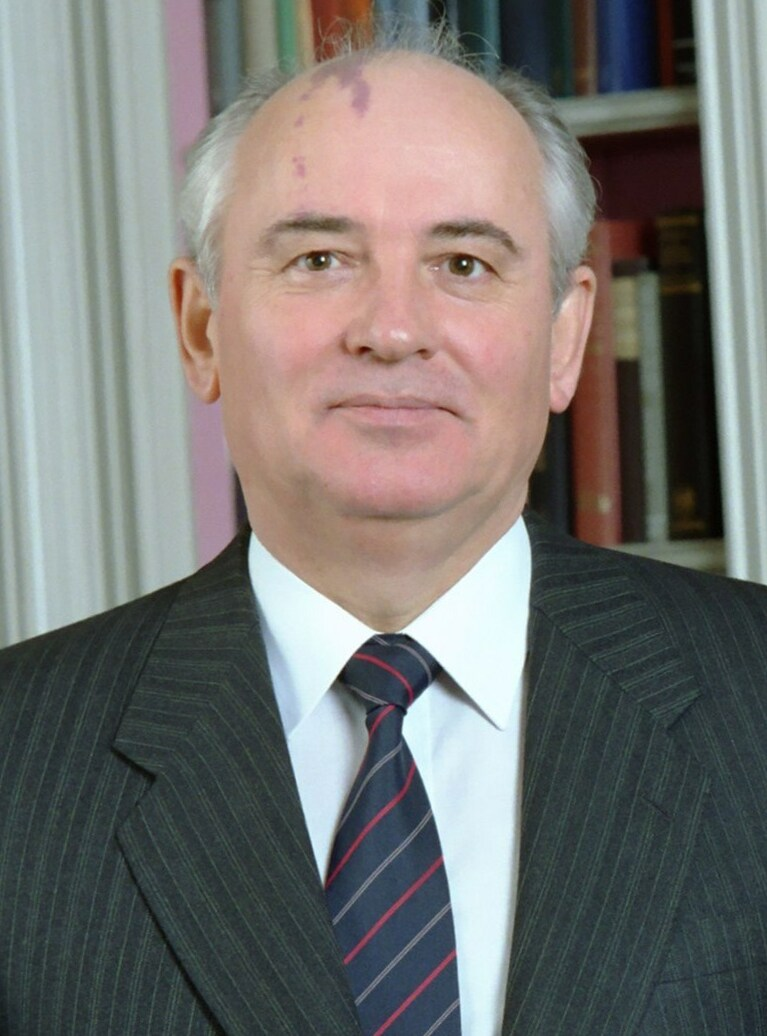
Mikhail Gorbachev in 1987

Mikhail Gorbachev became the General Secretary of the Communist Party of the Soviet Union in 1985 after the death of Konstantin Chernenko, making him the de facto leader of the Soviet Union. Gorbachev, seeking to lead the country out of an "Era of stagnation" and away from authoritarianism, enacted a number of liberalisation reforms in order to save the Soviet political and economic system from collapse. These reforms, most notably glasnost and perestroika, failed to improve the standard of living and often caused more problems instead of solving them. Ironically, the economy of the Soviet Union which had been in a state of stagnation since the 1970s began to shrink rather than grow. By 1990, Gorbachev was extremely unpopular with both hardliners and reformers, and there were several failed attempts to oust him from power.

=== Perpetrator ===
Aleksandr Shmonov Александр Шмонов
- Born: Aleksandr Anatolevich Shmonov; 21 February 1952 (age 74); Leningrad, RSFSR, Soviet Union
- Occupation: Locksmith

Details
- Date: 7 November 1990 c. 11:00 a.m.
- Locations: Moscow, Soviet Union
- Targets: Mikhail Gorbachev, Soviet Leadership
- Killed: 0
- Injured: 0

Aleksandr Shmonov was born on 21 February 1952 in Leningrad to an affluent family. After serving in the Soviet Army, he worked as a mechanic at the Izhora Plant in Kolpino. Shmonov was a member of the Social Democratic Party of Russia, having joined the party in the late 1980s before its official founding, and a strong supporter of democratic reforms in the Soviet Union. He blamed Gorbachev for the April 9 tragedy in Tbilisi in April 1989, and the Black January massacre in Baku in January 1990. Shmonov was opposed to the upcoming inaugural election for the President of the Soviet Union (an office which Gorbachev had created) in March 1990. It was an indirect election held by the Congress of People's Deputies with Gorbachev as its sole candidate, which was perceived by some as a rigged election. He determined that Gorbachev should be assassinated in order to guarantee democratic presidential elections.

Shmonov meticulously planned the assassination attempt, having purchased a rare shotgun from Germany with a police permit, which he then manually transformed into a sawn-off shotgun. He would regularly practice shooting in the woods, and from March 1990 he began to post leaflets openly calling for the overthrow of the Communist Party and Gorbachev's death. Shmonov, before heading to Moscow to carry out his plan, wrote a letter to the Kremlin issuing an ultimatum but it was ignored.

== Attempt ==
On 7 November 1990, during the annual October Revolution Parade, Shmonov disguised himself with a fake moustache and a wig, and joined a column of demonstrators moving towards the Lenin Mausoleum, where the Soviet leadership was standing to observe the parade. He was armed with two shotgun cartridges, both meant for Gorbachev, although he later admitted that if one had been enough, he would have used the other to kill Anatoly Lukyanov, the chairman of the Supreme Soviet, who was accompanying Gorbachev. Shmonov carried a note in his pocket, which he had written in anticipation of his potential death, clarifying that he intended to kill Gorbachev. At approximately 11 a.m., when Shmonov was just 47 meters away from the Lenin Mausoleum, he raised his sawn-off shotgun and fired two shots at Gorbachev, but a police officer seized the barrel mid aim, redirecting the shots skyward, after which a crowd of undercover KGB agents disguised as civilians overpowered him.

== Aftermath ==
Shmonov was held in pre-trial detention for a year before being declared insane and admitted to a mental institution, where he remained for four years until 1995, even after the Soviet Union had dissolved.

In 1999, Shmonov tried to run for the State Duma in Saint Petersburg, but was rejected by the local election commission. Shmonov has since become a human rights activist.

== See also ==
- Attempted assassination of Leonid Brezhnev
- Assassination attempts on Vladimir Lenin
- List of people who survived assassination attempts
