= March 19 shooting incident =

2004 assassination attempt of then-President of Taiwan Chen Shui-bian

The March 19 shooting incident (Chinese: 三一九槍擊事件), also known as the 319 incident, was an assassination attempt on President Chen Shui-bian and Vice President Annette Lu while they were campaigning in Tainan on 19 March 2004, the day before Taiwan's presidential election. Their injuries were not life-threatening, and both Chen and Lu were released from Chi-Mei Hospital on the same day without losing consciousness or undergoing surgery.

The attack provoked shock and unease in Taiwan, where political violence of this kind was commonplace against non-KMT members 40 years earlier. The New Taiwan dollar fell by 0.2 percent but quickly recovered.

Reaction to the incident divided along partisan lines. Some including Lu pointed to Beijing and the People's Republic of China for orchestrating the attack because of her and Chen's stance supporting Taiwanese independence from the mainland. By contrast their election opponent, Lien Chan, supported by the Pan-Blue Coalition, was a supporter for integration with the mainland. The opposing Pan-Blue supporters believed that the incident was faked in order to win the sympathy of voters in the upcoming election, which Chen and Lu won by 29,500 votes. Several forensic studies, including one conducted by an American team, showed that the gun wounds were real.

In August 2005, the case was officially closed with all evidence pointing to a single deceased suspect, Chen Yi-hsiung.

== Sequence of events ==
President Chen and Vice President Lu were standing in the back seat of an open convertible Jeep moving slowly through a crowded street when around 1:45 pm, a bullet penetrated the windshield of the vehicle, grazed Chen's stomach, and was stopped in his clothes. Chen received a flesh wound 11 centimetres (4.3 in) long and 2 centimetres (0.79 in) wide. The other bullet penetrated the windshield and hit a cast on Lu's knee which she was wearing due to an earlier injury and was later found in the vehicle. Wang Hsin-nan, a lawyer traveling with Chen, also confirmed the shots.

At first both believed that they had been hit by firecrackers, which are common in Taiwanese political parades and rallies. Chen realized that it was something more serious when he noticed that he was bleeding from the abdomen and that there was a bullet hole in the window. Chen reported pain in his abdomen and Lu reported pain in her knee and they were taken to the Chi-Mei Hospital. At 3:30 pm, the spokesperson for the president, Chiou I-jen, announced that the "National Security Mechanism" had been activated. By 5:30 pm, both the Pan-Blue and Pan-Green coalitions announced that they would cease all scheduled campaigning activities.

At 5:45 pm, the hospital announced that the president had suffered an 11 centimetres (4.3 in) long and 2 centimetres (0.79 in) wide gash across his abdomen. Around 6:00 pm, two shells were found on the campaign route where the shooting took place. Pictures of Chen's scars were also displayed publicly.

The president returned to his official residence by 9:00 pm and, in a video released to the public, he urged the Taiwanese people to remain calm and indicated that neither his health nor the security of Taiwan was threatened.

The next day's election was not postponed, as Taiwanese law only allows for suspension of an election on the death of a candidate. Chen's opponent, Lien Chan, and Lien's campaign manager Wang Jin-pyng tried to visit Chen on the night of the incident, but were unable to see the president because he was resting. Chen appeared in public the next day when he turned out to cast his vote.

== Investigation ==
Within hours, police announced that the crime was not political, and that the People's Republic of China was not involved. Some Pan-Blue supporters theorized that the incident was staged in order for Chen to gain sympathy votes, while some Pan-Green supporters theorized that the assassination was a plot of China.

These speculations were considered highly offensive by both camps and were not condoned by the leaderships of the two sides until after Chen had already won the election.

Two bullet casings were found by a civilian under a police car after it was driven away. The casings found suggested that only two shots were fired at the motorcade. Their assembly also suggested that they were fired from home-made guns. It is unclear as to whether they were fired from the same gun, or from different guns.

The police did not find or identify any suspect involved in the shooting. There were several people the police wanted to question based on erratic behavior, such as leaving the scene in a hurry as recorded by surveillance camera. A few people showed up after they recognized themselves on the broadcast footage, but these proved to be inconclusive.

The bullet trajectory proposed by the police suggested that a bullet struck the windshield, entered Lu's knee, and then fell out. Another bullet fired from the Jeep's side struck Chen's stomach and traveled through his jacket and lodged in the rear of the jacket until recovered by the hospital staff.

=== Conclusion ===
On 29 March 2004, three American forensic scientists arrived in Taiwan to help with the investigation. They were Cyril Wecht, a forensic expert, Michael Haag, an expert on bullet trajectory, and Timothy Palmbach, an expert on crime scene integrity. Wecht personally examined Chen's belly and concluded it was consistent with a gunshot wound.

They were followed by Henry C. Lee on 9 April 2004. After examining the Jeep, he deduced that the shots were fired from the outside because there were shards of glass on the Jeep's floor. But due to the incompleteness of evidence preservation, and the lack of an accurate record on the Jeep's speed at the day of procession, he pointed out that it might be impossible to determine from which direction the bullets entered the Jeep.

Interior Minister Yu Cheng-hsien announced his resignation on 4 April 2004, and National Security Bureau director Tsai Chao-ming stepped down the week before to take responsibility for the shooting, in keeping with the Taiwanese tradition that government officials take responsibility for perceived or implied dereliction of duty.

From 10 to 20 June 2004, a group of former Combined Logistics Command engineers, including former Olympian Chen An-hu, took part in the investigation by simulating the shooting in a Los Angeles shooting range.

On 24 August 2004, the Pan-Blue controlled Legislative Yuan approved legislation setting up the "3–19 truth investigative commission" to probe the shooting. Members of the commission were selected to reflect the political composition of the Fifth Legislative Yuan. The commission had the right to interview government officials and demand documents, and later presented its findings to the legislature. The law suspended the right to silence and forbid influencing the commission's investigation. The commission was also authorized to command a government prosecuting attorney, to unilaterally utilize the disaster reserve funds from the Executive Yuan, and to override court verdicts. Because such a law was suspected unconstitutional, the Pan-Green Coalition opposed the commission.

Forensic scientist Henry Lee submitted a 130-page report and a CD containing 150 photos to Andrew Hsia, director general of Taipei Economic and Cultural Office in New York on 29 August 2004. He concluded that the incident was not a political assassination attempt because "a more powerful weapon than a homemade pistol would have been used." He was unable to make a conclusive report, but indicated his findings would help locate the gun and its factory. Lee's findings prompted immediate outrage from conspiracy theorists as it did not fit well with either side.

On 9 September 2004, three men – Yeh Ho-chiang, 37, Chen Ching-hung, 33, and Huang Chin-shou, 43 – were arrested at an illegal weapons factory near Tainan possessing bullets matching those found at the crime scene.

On 7 March 2005, Taiwanese police held a conference about the shooting incident. Two suspects were named; Chen Yi-hsiung and Huang Hung-Ren. Both of them were found dead shortly after the 3–19 incident. Chen was living in the vicinity and resembled one of the unknown persons shown on police tapes in the hot zone (the "yellow coat bald guy"). The tape was released by the police on 26 March 2004, and Chen was found drowned in a harbor on March 28. The connection between Chen and the weapon maker was established by confirming Chen as being the 5th hand of a possible weapon; additionally family members of Chen stated that he left suicide notes, which according to the Taiwanese police's interpretation hinted that he committed the crime, although the notes had been burned by the family, and the interpretation held by the police is at best tenuous. Additionally the family members were reported to have recalled strange behavior of Chen following the 3–19 shooting. On the other hand, Huang also committed suicide with a gun that was made from the same manufacturer as that of the incident, and the bullet found shared traits with the one that hit the vice-president.

A fisherman reported to have seen Chen "with the suspected agents near Anping Harbor on March 26 and 27, 2004 — a few days prior to Chen Yi-hsiung’s death — seeking to rent a boat from the fisherman, possibly to use it to escape."

On 17 August 2005, the case was officially closed after the investigators concluded that Chen acted alone. However, there continue to be lingering doubts among a substantial part of the population of both sides. Lien, who happened to be leaving office as KMT chairman on the same day, publicly expressed disbelief. A China Times poll purportedly showed that only 19% of the surveyed persons believe that there had been a sufficiently thorough investigation. Pan-Blue legislators have called for continued investigation of the case, as has Vice President Lu.

== Aftermath ==
Lu "cited exiled Chinese academic Yuan Hongbing as saying that Beijing might have plotted the assassination to polarize Taiwan as part of its scheme to annex the nation." Allegedly, Hu Jintao and PLA officer Xin Qi plotted to injure Chen and Lu without fatally wounding them. Moreover, it was aimed "at damaging Taiwan's democracy and making Taiwanese believe that elections were rigged, but it had to see Chen Shui-bian and Lu re-elected so that the Chinese Nationalist Party (KMT), losing power and authority, would be willing to succumb to China."

Some pan-Blue supporters painted the incident as a sham staged to boost sympathy for Chen and win the election, arguing that the wounds inflicted upon the President and Vice President were improbably light and citing various perceived irregularities in the chronology of events and the physical and photographic evidence.

The Pan-Blue claimed the activation of National Security Mechanism after the incident recalls military and police personnels on leave, which may have affected the election's outcome as the recalled personnels were not able to vote. The court refuted the claim because the military and police said the number of staying personnel was not affected.

== In popular culture ==
The incident was dramatized in the film The Shooting of 319 (2019), directed by Fu Changfeng.
