= Commission of Inquiry (India) =

Commission of Inquiry is a Union or State government ordered public inquiry either by executive notice or by making ad hoc legislation.

In some cases the judicial courts have intervened and appointed commissioners to inquire into matters of public interest.

== See also ==
- List of Indian commissions
