= Attack against Porfirio Díaz of 1897 =

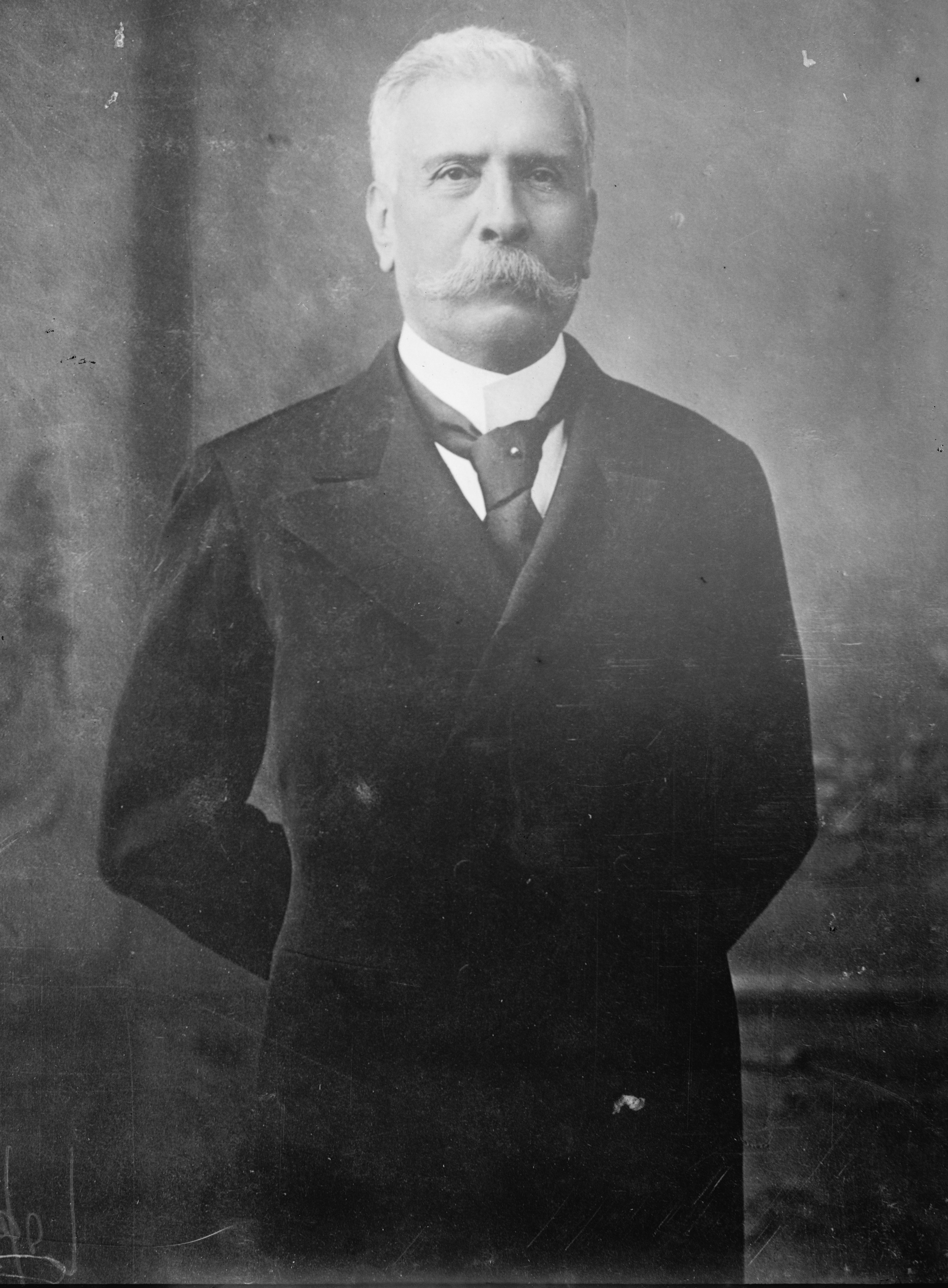
Porfirio Díaz

The attack against Porfirio Díaz of 1897 refers to the attack on 16 September 1897 on the Mexican president in the Alameda Central of Mexico City. The perpetrator was identified as Arnulfo Arroyo, who was imprisoned and murdered the same day by a crowd. This is considered the first lynching in Mexico.

The event inspired the novel Expendiente del atentado by writer Álvaro Uribe in 2008, which was adapted to film in 2010 under the name El atentado by the director Jorge Fons.

== Chronology of the attack ==
As he crossed Alameda Central during a celebration of the Independence of Mexico of 16 September 1897, the president Porfirio Díaz was attacked by "a known drunk named Arnulfo Arroyo". According to the account of the Mexican chronicler Jesús Rábago in Historia del gran crimen (1897), Díaz was accompanied by the generals Francisco Zacarías Mena, the minister of communications, and Felipe Berriozábal, minister of war, when Arroyo attacked him from behind and was immediately detained.

Uribe, author of Expediente del atentado, said in a conference in 2014 that Arroyo was "an anarchist law clerk who that day was found drunk", implying that he could not consummate the attack because he was drunk. Based on the journals of the diplomat Federico Gamboa, Uribe related that Arroyo overtook a ring of cadets of the Military School, approaching Díaz to attack him, although he did not carry any type of weapon or firearm.

After the failed attack, Díaz ordered Arroyo moved to the commissariat, where it was confirmed that he was not armed. The New York Times on 18 September 1897 said "from the moment in which Arroyo was detained [...] The people clamored for his death. Lieutenant LaCroix, who was the attendant of the arrested person, was harassed for not shooting him". The same night, on 16 September, Arroyo was stabbed to death, reportedly by a group of people who burst into the commissariat during the morning. Next day, 17 September 1897, the president Díaz regretted the death of his aggressor, a comment that was repeated by General Berriozábal, as well as the international press.

=== Reactions ===
On 18 December, the newspaper El Imparcial published an account of the lynching of Arroyo, a version that was questioned by the population. Likewise, the police conducted a raid in which 21 suspects were arrested and accused of having participated in the homicide of Arroyo. These factors outraged to the citizens, mobilizing about 15 thousand people to demonstrate in front of the offices of The Impartial, who burned copies of the newspaper and accused the newspaper of blaming people for a murder committed by the police.

It was such a scandal that the Congress called on Manuel González Cosío, then minister of the Interior, so that it surrendered accounts. On September 21, congressman Eduardo Velázquez and twelve other members of the police were taken to Belén prison, where they confessed to have murdered Arroyo and staging everything so that it seemed a public lynching. After the indictment, Velázquez committed suicide and the rest of those implicated were sentenced to death. However, the sentences were commuted to prison; in some cases, the condemned returned to public office after serving the sentence.

== In popular culture ==
- The novel Expediente del atentado, of the Mexican writer Álvaro Uribe, approach the event. In 2008, the book was awarded the Iberoamerican Novel Prize Elena Poniatowska.
- The film El atentado by the filmmaker Jorge Fons also retells the event. He won the Ariel Award for Best Costume in 2011.

== See also ==
- Porfirio Díaz
- Porfiriato
