= Attempted assassination of Pedro II of Brazil =

1889 failed assassination on the Brazilian Emperor

Attempted assassination of Pedro II
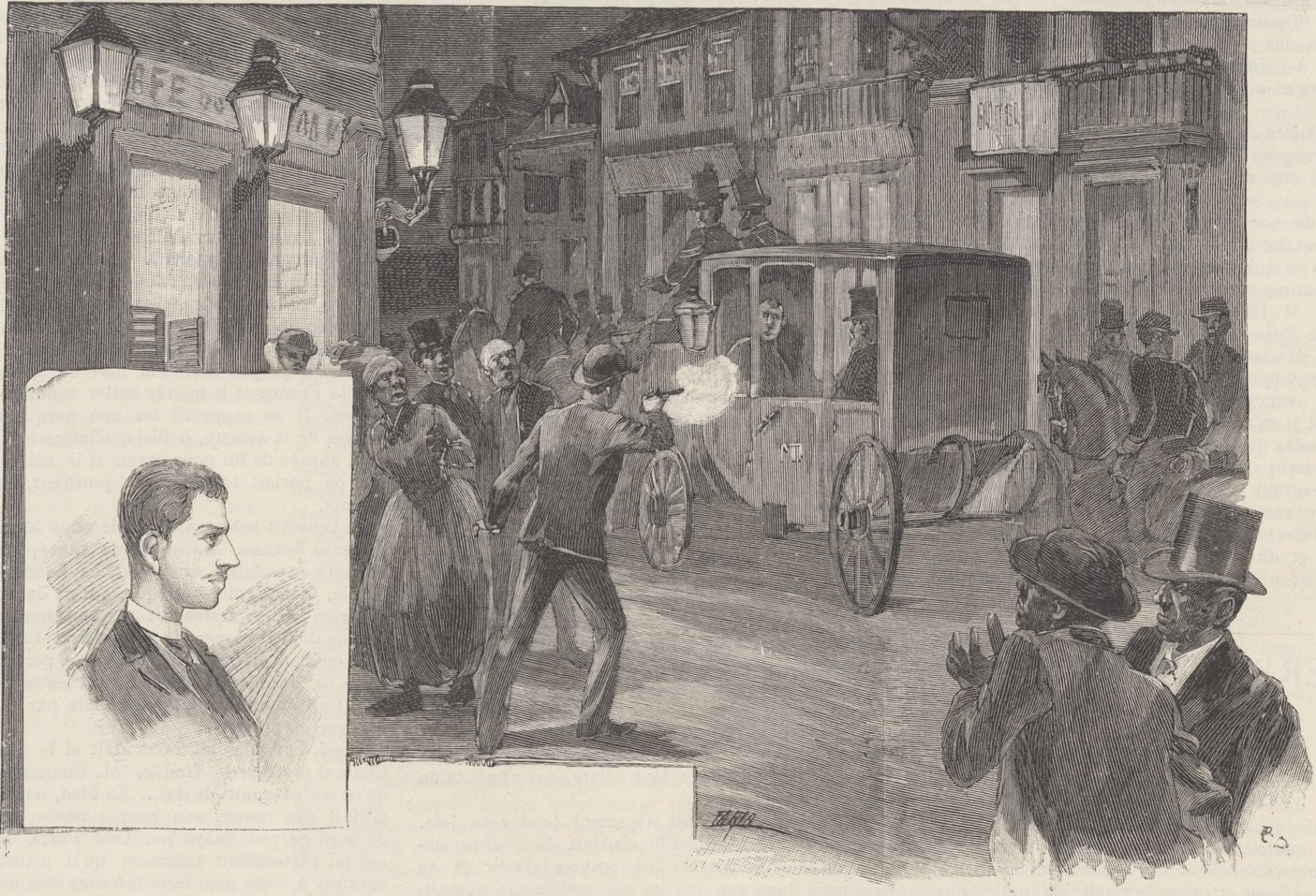
- From the French magazine Le Monde illustré, 21 September 1889
- Location: Constituição Square, Rio de Janeiro, Empire of Brazil
- Date: 15 July 1889; 137 years ago
- Target: Pedro II of Brazil, Emperor of Brazil
- Attack type: Attempted assassination by gunshot
- Weapon: Revolver
- Deaths: None
- Injuries: None
- Perpetrator: Adriano Augusto do Valle

On the night of 15 July 1889, an attempt was made on the life of Emperor Pedro II of Brazil in the Constituição Square (currently the Tiradentes Square) in Rio de Janeiro. Adriano Augusto do Valle, a Portuguese immigrant, shot at Pedro's carriage while shouting in praise of the republic. The shots missed and do Valle escaped, though he was later captured.

The incident is known in Brazil as the July Attack (Portuguese: Atentado de Julho).

== Attack ==
Pedro was returning by carriage to the Imperial Palace after attending a concert by Italian violinist Giulietta Dionesi at the Teatro Sant'Anna (today the Carlos Gomes Theatre). As the carriage passed the Maison Moderne restaurant in Constituição Square, between the Espírito Santo Street (now Pedro I Street) and Travessa da Barreira (now Silva Jardim Street), it was fired upon by a 20-year-old Portuguese immigrant and unemployed clerk named Adriano Augusto do Valle. The shots missed and the carriage continued along Rua da Carioca to the palace.

Do Valle was later arrested in a bar where he had been drunkenly boasting that he had shot at Pedro and would do it again.

During the attack do Valle shouted praise for the republic, but he had no connection with the Brazilian republican movement. He died 30 March 1903 of tuberculosis, aged 36, in the municipality of Miracema, northwest of the state of Rio de Janeiro, and was buried in the public cemetery of Miracema.

== Reactions ==
The attack was condemned by the leader of the Republican Party, Quintino Bocaiuva, in the newspaper O Paiz, as well as by other republican press organizations such as Gazeta da Tarde and República Brazileira. The incident spurred controversy around immigration to Brazil, which grew during the 1880s. Because do Valle was Portuguese, the Portuguese ambassador to Brazil, Nogueira Soares, called a meeting to discuss the attack. Portuguese associations released a note of repudiation of the attack, and the board of the Portuguese Literary Lyceum announced its total disagreement with the act.
