= Attempted assassination of Leonid Brezhnev =

1969 attack on Soviet leader in Moscow

- Location: Moscow, Soviet Union
- Date: 22 January 1969; 57 years ago
- Target: Leonid Brezhnev
- Attack type: Shooting
- Weapon: 2 Makarov pistols
- Deaths: 1
- Injuries: 2+
- Perpetrator: Viktor Ilyin

On 22 January 1969, Viktor Ilyin attempted to assassinate Soviet leader Leonid Brezhnev in Moscow. Ilyin, a deserter from the Soviet Army, fired shots at a motorcade carrying Brezhnev and celebrated cosmonauts of the Soviet space program into the Kremlin. A driver was killed and a guard and several cosmonauts were injured, while Brezhnev was unhurt. Ilyin was arrested and claimed that he tried to kill Brezhnev to provoke political change in the Soviet Union after witnessing extreme poverty in the countryside. Ilyin was sent to a psikhushka and the incident was subject to a strict news blackout, which was maintained by the Soviet government for two decades thereafter. Ilyin was released in 1990 and knowledge of the incident became public after the dissolution of the Soviet Union in 1991.

It was the first direct assassination attempt on a Soviet leader since Fanny Kaplan's attempt to assassinate Vladimir Lenin in August 1918.

== Perpetrator ==
Viktor Ivanovich Ilyin was born in 1947 in Leningrad and sought to become a geologist but, after his graduation from a technical college in 1968, he was conscripted into the Soviet Army. Ilyin was inducted at the rank of lieutenant, though he was said to have resented his forced conscription and distressed by the Warsaw Pact invasion of Czechoslovakia that year.

On 21 January 1969, Ilyin stole two standard-issue Makarov pistols and deserted his army unit based in Lomonosov. He went back to his family in Leningrad where he stole his brother-in-law's authentic Militsiya uniform. Ilyin then left on an unannounced, solitary flight to Moscow, and arrived the following day.

== Cosmonauts' motorcade ==
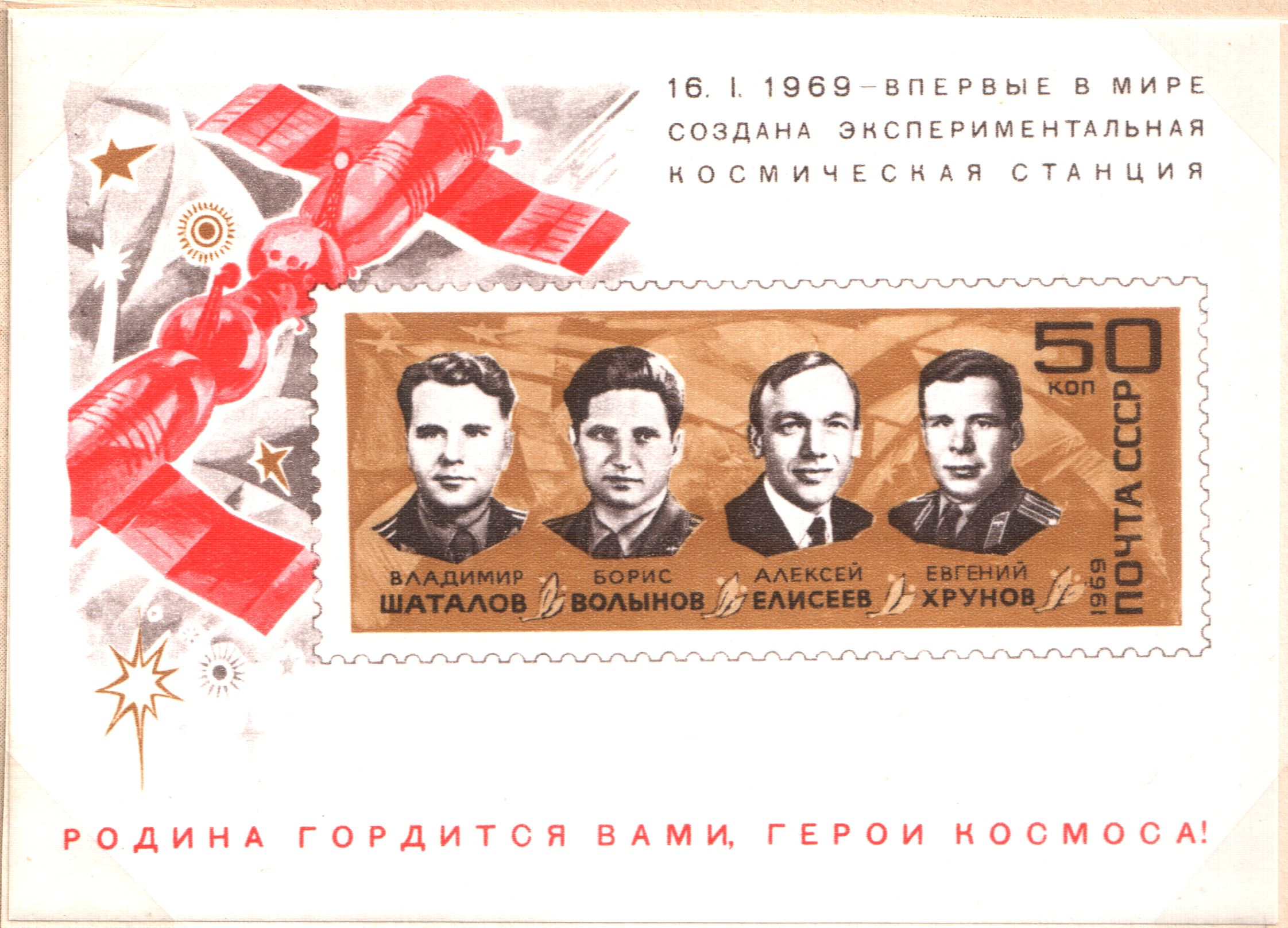
Vladimir Shatalov, Boris Volynov, Aleksei Yeliseyev and Yevgeny Khrunov, the four cosmonauts of Soyuz 4 and Soyuz 5.

Ilyin's actions coincided with a special, heavily-publicised motorcade that was transporting four successful cosmonauts of Soyuz 4 and Soyuz 5 of the Soviet space program all the way from Vnukovo Airport to the Kremlin. The spaceflight crewmembers—Vladimir Shatalov, Boris Volynov, Yevgeny Khrunov, and Aleksei Yeliseyev—had returned only a week earlier from their historic manned-ship-to-manned-ship docking mission in space, the first of its kind. Arriving at Vnukovo Airport, they were being driven with Soviet leader Leonid Brezhnev and the head of state Nikolai Podgorny to their commemorative celebration inside the Kremlin's Palace of Congresses. The four honorees rode in an open convertible at the front of the line, waving to spectators while a line of closed limousines trailed behind them.

Ilyin, dressed as a policeman, arrived at the Kremlin before the motorcade and moved unimpeded through a large crowd that was clustered at the Borovitsky Gate, where it was due to enter.

== Assassination attempt ==
At 2:15 p.m. on 22 January 1969, as the motorcade passed through the gate, Ilyin drew the pistols in both hands and opened fire on the second car in the line. Ignoring the waving cosmonauts, he later admitted that he only assumed it carried Brezhnev, but this ZiL-111G limousine was filled only with other cosmonauts from earlier missions: Alexei Leonov, Valentina Tereshkova, Georgy Beregovoy, and Andriyan Nikolayev. Ilyin's shots struck the second limousine fourteen times, killing the driver Ilya Zharkov, before a guard ran Ilyin down with his motorcycle. The other occupants of the car were unscathed or suffered only superficial wounds, including Beregovoy who was injured by broken glass. After Ilyin was arrested, the cosmonauts' ceremony took place as planned, slightly delayed.

== Aftermath ==
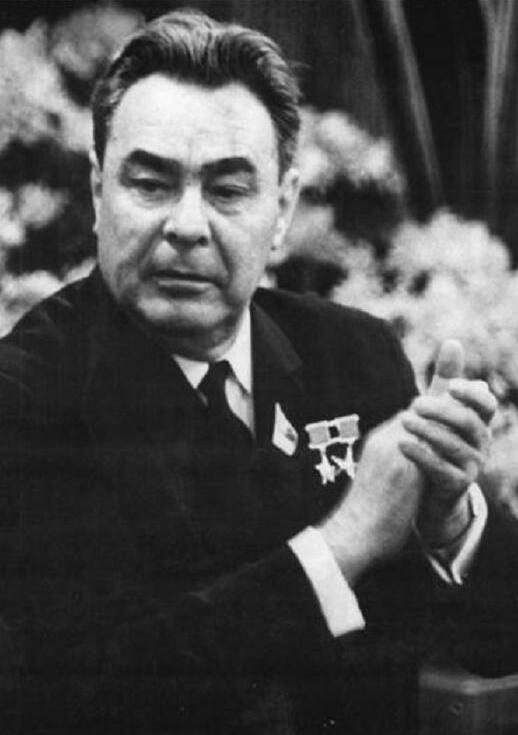
Leonid Brezhnev, the target of the assassination attempt

Ilyin underwent a lengthy interrogation led by KGB chief, and future Soviet leader, Yuri Andropov. During his interrogation, the recording of which was found in the Russian State Archives after 1991, Ilyin told Andropov that his motivation to assassinate Brezhnev was to have him replaced with his Second Secretary and Party Ideologue Mikhail Suslov, whom Ilyin called "the most outstanding person in the party at the moment". Whether this was true or if he was simply trying to provoke infighting within the Politburo remains unknown. Ilyin was charged with attempted murder, terrorism, and desertion offences, but he was ultimately pronounced insane and sent to Kazan Psychiatric Hospital, a psikhushka in Kazan where he was kept in solitary confinement until 1988. According to Russian sources, Ilyin was moved to a psikhushka near Leningrad in 1988 and released in 1990. The bullet-holed limousine has been preserved and is occasionally put on public exhibition.

== Legacy ==
News of the assassination attempt on Brezhnev was scant and slow to emerge. An official Soviet press statement was made two days after the shooting, but did not say if the shooter was a man or a woman. However, even without official confirmation, the event was seen as an assassination attempt on Brezhnev.

Years later, the cosmonaut Leonov recounted how Brezhnev confided to him after the incident: "Those bullets were not meant for you, Alexei. They were meant for me, and for that I apologize." But until the dissolution of the Soviet Union in 1991, the KGB released little information about the shooting. The entire incident was "so effectively hushed up" that it was sometimes cited by Western observers as a prime example of Soviet secrecy.

== See also ==
- Attempted assassination of Konrad Adenauer
- Attempted assassination of Mikhail Gorbachev
- Assassination attempts on Vladimir Lenin
