= Garson Romalis =

Canadian gynaecologist

Garson Romalis (October 23, 1937 – January 31, 2014) was a Canadian gynecologist who specialized in providing abortions. (See Abortion in Canada.) He was twice wounded in attempts on his life. The first attempt on his life was by far the most violent anti-abortion crime in Canada, according to the National Post. The second attempt was made by an unknown assailant who stabbed him and fled. Since being personally attacked, Romalis became more outspoken and more determined to provide abortions to women who want them. As such, he was a notable public figure in the Canadian abortion debate. The University of Toronto Law School invited him to speak at their Symposium to mark the 20th Anniversary of R. v Morgentaler. He worked to convince medical students of the need to continue providing abortions.

== Medical training ==
Romalis first observed the results of illegal abortions in 1960, when he was in medical school. He was assigned the case of a young woman who had died of a septic abortion after using a folk remedy slippery elm bark. It often contains spores of the bacteria that cause gas gangrene, which is what had killed the young woman. She developed an overwhelming infection. An autopsy showed multiple abscesses throughout her body, in her abdomen, liver, lungs, and brain. Romalis never forgot that case.

Romalis again encountered the results of illegal abortions in 1962, during his internship at Cook County Hospital in Illinois, when he spent a month on the septic obstetrics ward. He recalls that in those days hospitals had entire wards for the victims of complications of pregnancy, and ninety percent of them had complications of septic abortion. The ward had about 40 beds, and more beds lining the halls for the overflow. Each day, the hospital admitted 10 to 30 patients with septic abortion. Each morning, the interns prepared 40 to 60 litres of intravenous fluid containing tetracycline, oxytocin and ergometrine for incoming patients. Because of the antibiotics, only about one woman died each month. The cause was usually septic shock associated with hemorrhage. In the mid-1970s, a US report revealed a large drop in maternal mortality since abortion was legalized. David Boyes, a founder of BC’s Pap test program, told Romalis that the numbers were straightforward and "it suggests that politicians, with a few strokes of a pen, have saved more lives than we have with twenty-five years of effort screening for cervical cancer."

Garson Romalis was drawn to obstetrics and gynecology because he loved delivering babies. Abortion was illegal when he trained: he did not learn how to do abortions then. However, he remarks that he had "more than my share of experience looking after illegal abortion complications." He pointed out that in Canada and the U.S., septic shock from illegal abortion is virtually never seen today. Like smallpox, it is a "disappeared disease."

== Medical career ==
In 1972, Romalis started the practise of obstetrics and gynecology. Abortion law in Canada had been liberalized in 1969. In his practice, Romalis and his partners saw many women who wanted to terminate a pregnancy. He therefore learned how to perform abortions. Romalis found providing abortion services often stressful because the patients were very stressed. He stated, "Usually, an unplanned, unwanted pregnancy is the worst trouble the patient has ever been in in her entire life." He added, "by performing a five-minute operation, in comfort and dignity, I can give her back her life."

In 1994, Romalis was shot and nearly killed by a sniper with a high-powered rifle firing into his home. In the aftermath of this first assassination attempt, Romalis almost died several times from blood loss and multiple other complications. After about two years of physical and emotional rehabilitation, he was able to resume work part-time. He could no longer do his favourite part of the job, delivering babies, nor perform major gynecological surgery. However, he continued to work as a gynecologist, including providing abortion services.

In July, 2000, Romalis was stabbed by an unknown assailant, which caused him to take some time off to recover and add security measures to his routine. About two months later, he returned to work. After 2000, he performed only abortions.

== Attacks from anti-abortionists ==
Romalis was heavily picketed and harassed by anti-abortion activists, especially during the 1980s. They would picket his home and throw nails onto his driveway, hoping to damage his tires.

On November 8, 1994, someone (suspected to be an anti-abortion terrorist) fired a high-powered rifle into the Romalis home, striking Romalis and severely injuring him. The shot hit his thigh, damaging his muscles and shattering his femur. The most dangerous injury was to his femoral artery, one of the largest arteries in the body. He was in danger of bleeding to death. He saved himself by improvising a tourniquet with the belt of his bathrobe. His wife and daughter, who were also home at the time, were not injured. Police said the sniper may have used an AK-47 automatic rifle. Mark Schonfeld, president of the British Columbia Medical Association, expressed shock that someone would be shot, because it is "so foreign to our way of life and our thinking." Abortion has been legal in Canada since 1988. The Romalis house had been picketed by antiabortion groups in the past. At the time, police did not have a suspect in mind. A reward of $60,000 was offered, $40,000 from the police forces and $20,000 from the Manitoba Medical Association.

In December, 1997, several Canadian police forces formed a joint task force to manage their investigation into sniper attacks against three Canadian doctors, Romalis of Vancouver; Hugh Short of Ancaster, Ontario; and Jack Fainman of Winnipeg, Manitoba. On the joint task force were representatives of the Royal Canadian Mounted Police and the police forces of Vancouver, Hamilton, and Winnipeg. The police say that sniper attacks against Canadian physicians are terrorist acts and that the hunt for the attackers deserves a coordinated national effort. In 2001, James Kopp was charged with the shooting of Dr. Hugh Short and is suspected of committing the other two shootings. Kopp is currently in prison in the United States, for the 1998 sniper-style murder of Barnett Slepian, an American physician from Amherst, New York who performed abortions.

In 2000, a young man accosted Romalis in the medical building where he worked and stabbed him. Romalis was not seriously injured. The attacker was not identified. Several witnesses had seen the attacker waiting for some time before Romalis arrived and even used a restroom in a pharmacy that opens onto the lobby. They described him as a white man in his 20s or 30s wearing a dark grey or black sweatsuit with a hood. When Romalis arrived, the attacker stabbed him in the back of the lower left ribcage. The man escaped through the parking lot of the building. A parking valet, Jesse Brouwer, chased the attacker for more than a block without success. News reports stated that about an hour before the stabbing, police were called to another clinic, Everywoman's Health Centre, because of aggressive anti-abortion protesters, on the lawn of the house next door. Three white men, two of whom had not been there before, were trying to intimidate women entering the clinic. The staff became so concerned about the level of intimidation that they called police. After police talked to them, the three men left about noon. Romalis was stabbed just before 1 p.m.

Vancouver police created a composite picture of the attacker who stabbed Romalis in the back. A man claiming to be the attacker called a local newspaper, threatening all the local abortion providers. A police spokeswoman said that the man claimed to be from the "Baby Liberation Army." On the same day, a man called another abortion provider in the city to warn that she would be next.

== Death ==
Romalis died on January 31, 2014, at St. Paul's Hospital in Vancouver, following a brief illness.

== Other activities ==
Romalis was a speaker at the public 70th birthday party for Henry Morgentaler in Toronto, which was held in a small theatre on Yonge Street.
