= Chen Yi-hsiung =

Taiwanese criminal

- Traditional Chinese: 陳義雄
- Simplified Chinese: 陈义雄
Transcriptions
Standard Mandarin
- Hanyu Pinyin: Chén Yìxióng
- Wade–Giles: Ch'en² I⁴-hsiung²
- Tongyong Pinyin: Chén Yì-syóng

Chen Yi-hsiung (died 29 March 2004) was the prime suspect in the March 19 shooting incident, a failed attempt to assassinate the president of Taiwan Chen Shui-bian, and perhaps vice president Annette Lu, on 19 March 2004, one day prior to the 2004 presidential election. Chen was unemployed and blamed the president for his economic woes.

== Finding Chen Yi-hsiung ==
Working off of clues from a video that was shot near the attack, authorities spent months tracing the bullets used in the assassination attempt to an illegal gun maker. After questioning the individual, investigators were able to follow the purchase to Chen Yi-hsiung, who was found drowned in a harbour in Tainan 10 days after the attack.

== Controversy ==
With the case officially closed, and the main suspect Chen Yi-hsiung dead, police have had a hard time proving their theory. Chen Yi-hsiung's death was officially ruled a suicide, and suicide notes (supposedly burned by his family) and a video of his wife apologizing for her husband's crime appear to confirm the police theory, but opponents of president Chen disagree with this conclusion. President Chen's foes claim that the assassination attempt was planned in order to win sympathy votes; president Chen won the election by just over 29,500 votes after the attempted assassination.
