= 2020 Barquisimeto shooting =

2020 attack in Venezuela

Barquisimeto shooting
- Part of the Venezuelan presidential crisis
- 2020 Barquisimeto shooting (Venezuela)
- Location: Juan de Villegas parish, Barquisimeto, Lara state, Venezuela
- Date: 29 February 2020; 6 years ago
- Weapon: Firearms
- Deaths: 0
- Injuries: 10
- Perpetrator: Colectivos

The 2020 Barquisimeto shooting occurred on 29 February 2020, when pro-government colectivos shot at the Speaker of the National Assembly of Venezuela Juan Guaidó and his supporters in Barquisimeto, Lara state during a demonstration, leaving ten injured.

== Background ==
A power struggle concerning who is the legitimate President of Venezuela began on 10 January 2019, when the opposition-majority National Assembly declared that incumbent Nicolás Maduro's 2018 re-election was invalid; that the office of the President of Venezuela was therefore vacant; and declared its president, Juan Guaidó, to be acting president of the nation. As of February 2020, Guaidó had been recognized as the interim president of Venezuela by 54 countries, including the United States and most nations of Latin America and Europe.

== Shooting ==
On 29 February Juan Guaidó mobilized a march against the government of Nicolás Maduro in the Juan de Villegas parish, Barquisimeto, Lara state. Guaidó was in a van at the time of the shooting, which was fired upon by pro-government colectivos. Bolivarian National Intelligence Service agents were also reported of having participated in the attack. The shooting left a total of ten wounded, including a 16-year-old boy. Guaidó's vehicle received nine gunshots.

According to opposition deputy Alfonso Marquina, in addition to the wounded, one person was kidnapped.

== Reactions ==
=== Domestic ===
- (Venezuela) Venezuelan government: Diosdado Cabello, president of the Constituent Assembly, said that the shooting was a false flag attack.
- (Venezuela) Venezuelan opposition: Juan Guaidó, after the shooting, said that "the dictatorship tried to assassinate me today. They aimed at me. Our only limit is the physical limit". Guaidó accused Diosdado Cabello of being the intellectual author of the shooting.

=== International ===
The European Union, Spain, and the Organization of American States condemned the attack against the demonstration.

- European Union: The EU issued a statement saying: "Acts of this nature against the opposition and the democratically elected National Assembly and its members are unacceptable and further hinder efforts towards a political solution to the crisis. The right of all political forces and civil society to demonstrate peacefully must be respected."
- Spain: The Spanish Ministry of Foreign Affairs condemned the shooting and rejected the harassment against Juan Guaidó.

== See also ==
- Operación Alacrán
