= Viktor Ilyin (military officer) =

Attempted assassin of Leonid Brezhnev (born 1947)

Personal details
- Born: Viktor Ivanovich Ilyin; 26 December 1947 (age 78) Leningrad, Russian SFSR, Soviet Union
- Known for: Assassination attempt of Leonid Brezhnev

Military service
- Allegiance: Soviet Union
- Branch/service: Soviet Army
- Years of service: 1968–1969
- Rank: Second lieutenant

Viktor Ivanovich Ilyin (Russian: Ви́ктор Ива́нович Ильи́н; born 26 December 1947) is a former Soviet Army officer who attempted to assassinate the Soviet leader, Leonid Brezhnev, on 22 January 1969 in Moscow.

== Early life and education ==
Ilyin was born in Leningrad on 26 December 1947. He was less than two years old when he was taken away from his alcoholic parents and grew up in a foster family. He entered a topographical technical school and desired to become a geologist.

He was distressed by the Soviet invasion of Czechoslovakia in 1968, and had questioned local ideology officials about the Prague Spring.

== Assassination attempt and aftermath ==
After travelling to many different regions, Ilyin was left with a "depressing impression" of "poverty, drunkenness, devastation" - different to what Soviet television showed. As a result, he drafted a reform plan which included a monthly payment to each citizen from natural resource sales, which he sent to the Kremlin, but did not receive a response. He said that was when he decided to kill Brezhnev so that everyone would know of his ideas, where he planned to speak about his plan in court. He spent almost a year preparing to assassinate him and joined the army after graduation to gain access to weapons.

When Ilyin was on duty, he stole two Makarov guns and four magazines from his army unit's safe and went to Moscow. He went to the Kremlin, and looked for a good firing position, choosing a place very close to the entrance gate. When the motorcade entered the gates of Borovitskaya Tower, carrying cosmonauts and top Soviet leaders, Ilyin fired his pistols at the second vehicle that he erroneously thought was carrying Leonid Brezhnev. The vehicle was occupied by the cosmonauts Georgy Beregovoy, Alexei Leonov, Andrian Nikolaev, and Valentina Tereshkova. A bullet killed the limousine driver Ilya Zharkov who was driving as a substitute on his last day before retirement. Beregovoy was wounded, and Vasiliy Zatsipilin, who was part of the motorcycle escort, was also hit, but was able to aim his motorcycle at Ilyin, bringing him down. The guards arrested Ilyin.

Yuri Andropov, head of the KGB, personally questioned Ilyin. During his interrogation, the recording of which was found in the Russian State Archives after 1991, Ilyin told Andropov that his motivation to assassinate Brezhnev was to have him replaced with his Second Secretary and Party Ideologue Mikhail Suslov (whom Ilyin called "the most outstanding person in the party at the moment"). Whether this was true or if he was simply trying to provoke infighting within the Politburo remains unknown. He was facing the death penalty, but after an investigation, he was considered insane and was placed in a psikhushka for 20 years. In 1990, he was released.
