= Women Rising in Resistance =

Militant feminist group in Illinois

- Formation: 1983
- Purpose: Women's liberation
- Headquarters: Illinois
- Methods: Civil disobedience
- Website: https://www.womenrisinginresistance.org

Women Rising in Resistance was a militant feminist group in Illinois in the 1980s. The group emerged after the defeat of the Equal Rights Amendment in 1982. It was formed in 1983 and lasted until 1992.

== Political activities ==
=== White House protest ===
In 1983, Women Rising in Resistance protested outside the White House as part of a group of over 120 feminists calling for women's rights. The group was protesting the Reagan administration's position on women's rights. The protest was staged on the day marking the 63rd anniversary of the 19th Amendment and women carried banners saying, "Reagan's war on women fans the flame of women's rage."During this protest the activists were physically carried away by the police but no arrests were made.

=== Statue of Liberty protest ===
In 1986, Women Rising in Resistance staged a direct action protest at the Statue of Liberty in New York City. During this protest, they dropped on banner on the statue to raise awareness for the need for women's rights. The day of the protest was symbolic because it represented the 100th anniversary of the State of Liberty.

=== Lesbian rights ===
In the 1980s, under the leadership of Mary Lee Sargent, Women Rising in Resistance advocated for lesbian rights through public protests and publications in the Lavender Prairie News.

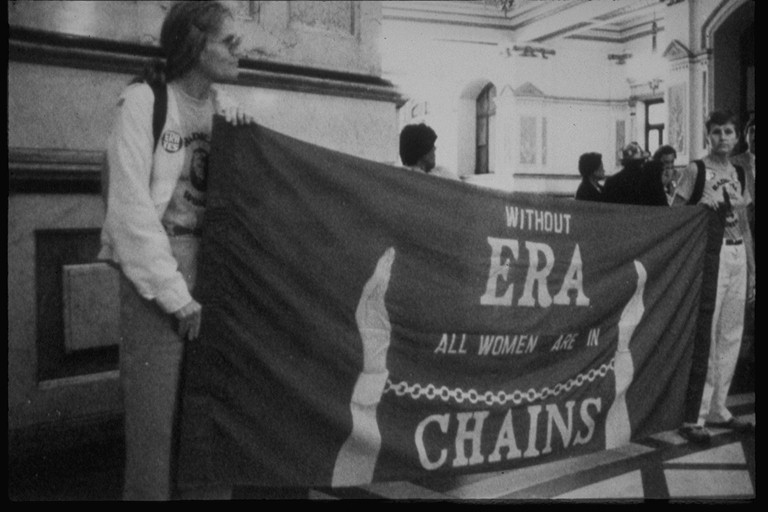
Mary Lee Sargent holding a banner in support of the Equal Rights Amendment in 1982

== State level protests ==
=== California ===
In July 1984, a group of women protested in Santa Cruz against a video story for selling material they felt promoted violence against women.

=== Iowa ===
In October 1984, 4 women affiliated with Women Rising in Resistance protested pornography in two adult bookstores where they tore up magazines. The group included Kimela Nelson and Melissa Farley who worked as a clinical psychologist. Both women were from Iowa City.

=== Ohio ===
In Ohio, a group of women calling themselves "Sisters of Justice" who were affiliated with Women Rising in Resistance protested against Franklin County Judge Frederick T. Williams. In 1984, three women wearing robes and hoods put a "curse" on him and threw glitter while chanting, "We are cursing you Fred for using your bench (to oppress women). May you feel great pain in your heart such as women do every time your politics interfere with justice."

=== Wisconsin ===
In 1984, a group of men and women affiliated with Women Rising in Resistance staged a public protest against an adult book store to show opposition to pornography.

== Members ==
Mary Lee Sargent and Berenice Carroll were both members of Women Rising in Resistance. Before this group was created in 1982, both had been members of the Grassroots Group of Second Class Citizens. Mary Ellen Gard participated in this organization and spoke on behalf of the group in the 1986 liberty protests. Margaret K. Johnson protested in 1984 against the Missouri campaign for Ronald Reagan as part of Women Rising in Resistance. She told the press the group was diverse and consisted of "...housewives, teachers, accountants, government employees, nurses, doctors and farmers."

== See also ==
- A Group of Women
- Grassroots Group of Second Class Citizens
- Sonia Johnson
- Zoe Nicholson
- Women Hunger for Justice
