= Georgia Fuller =

- Born: 1945 (age 80–81)
- Occupations: Women's Rights Activist, Leader of the National Organization for Women, Researcher at Quixote Center
- Years active: 1973-Present
- Organization(s): National Organization for Women, Congressional Union, Group of Women, Women's Ordination Conference
- Known for: Equal Rights Amendment
- Movement: Women's Liberation Movement, Congressional Union, Women's Ordination Movement
- Children: 2

Georgia Fuller is a women's rights activist who was heavily involved in the political struggle for the Equal Rights Amendment in the 1980s. She was a member of the Congressional Union, a feminist group in the 1980s, and was co-founder of the Arlington, Virginia chapter of the National Organization for Women (NOW).

== Involvement with National Organization for Women ==
Fuller was actively involved with the Virginia chapter of NOW, founded the Arlington chapter in 1975 and served as president of Virginia NOW. As part of her work with NOW, she was an advocate for LGBT rights, the Equal Rights Amendment and reproductive rights. At the 1981 conference, Fuller participated in a group called Congressional Union that called for more direct action to put pressure on the White House to support the ERA. The Congressional Union was active in the early 1980s and took its name from the original Congressional Union for Women's Suffrage founded by Alice Paul, the original author of the ERA. During the 1981, conference, Fuller wore chains to call attention the militant tactics that were coming to publicly support the ERA.

Fuller continued to be involved with NOW throughout the 1980s. In 1988, both Fuller and her husband Hugh signed a statement in the Richmond Times-Dispatch stating their public support for the Equal Rights Amendment. Her husband a longtime supporter of women's rights and worked as a leader in the NOW Arlington chapter.

=== NOW's Task Force on Women and Religion ===
Fuller was active with a variety of faith based social justice groups and in the 1970s, served as co-coordinator of the National Organization for Women's Task Force on Women and Religion. Fuller believed focusing on religion was an important strategy for feminist activism. Historian Mary J. Henold has quoted Fuller on religion as saying, "...there were only one or two feminist sisters with whom I could share my faith...Yes, I was a closet Christian! For in the early seventies, god was indeed dead for feminists."

When Sonia Johnson was excommunicated from the Church of Jesus Christ of Latter-day Saints for supporting the ERA, Fuller organized a prayer vigil on her behalf.

== Support for the Equal Rights Amendment ==
Fuller was part of an organization called A Group of Women who undertook militant action on behalf of the Equal Rights Amendment in the early 1980s. Sonia Johnson also belonged to this organization and took part in a variety of political campaigns alongside Fuller. These non-violent direct action tactics involved smearing red paint that looked like blood on the front of the National Archives. She was also part of a group of twenty women who went on a hunger strike to increase awareness of this amendment. In addition to her work for the ERA, Fuller was also politically active with LGBTQ+ issues as she helped organize a conference to discuss homophobia in the church.

=== Quixote Center ===
Fuller was a member of the Quixote Center which played an important role in organizing religiouis advocacy for the Equal Rights Amendment in the 1970s and 1980s. While working at the Quixote Center, she edited the book Are Catholics Ready? An Exploration of the Views of "Emerging Catholics" on Women in Ministry written by Sr. Maureen Fiedler and Dolly Pomerleau.

=== Chained to the White House fence ===
On August 26, 1982, Women's Equality Day, Fuller and a group of women chained themselves to the White House fence to protest inaction over the ERA. This was similar to a direct action tactic used by suffragist including Hazel Hunkins Hallinan who chained herself to the White House fence in 1917. In the 1982 action, Fuller and Charlotte Bunch gave speeches in Lafayette Park as supporters burned candles. The words of President Ronald Reagan were burned in bathtubs and the press reported the women as "latter day suffragettes." Fuller encouraged a direct comparison to the suffragists of the 1910s saying, "As the suffragette burned the words of Wilson, we in the same spirit burn the words of Reagan. And as our fore-mothers set watch-fires of freedom at the same site, we as American women ignite the watch-fires of equality."

=== Climbing the White House fence ===
On Susan B. Anthony's birthday, February 15, 1982, Fuller and 9 other women climbed over the White House fence to raise awareness for the need of an ERA. This was an organized action undertaken by the Washington, D.C. chapter of the Congressional Union

== Personal life ==
Fuller, a Quaker, was born in 1945 and has two children. She was married to Hugh Fuller who worked at the Securities and Exchange Commission, died in 2021. As of 2026, Fuller continued to give public presentations sharing her personal history about working for the ERA. In her later years, Fuller has been active with the Silver Panthers.

== See also ==
- A Group of Women
- Berenice A. Carroll
- Grassroots Group of Second Class Citizens
- Maureen Fiedler
- Sonia Johnson
- National Woman's Party
- Women Hunger for Justice
- Zoe Nicholson
