= Joan M. Martin =

American Protestant feminist theologian

The Reverend Joan M. Martin
- Born: New York, US

Ecclesiastical career
- Religion: Christianity (Presbyterian)
- Congregations: Christian Union Church, North Truro, Massachusetts

Academic background
- Education: Elmhurst University; Princeton Theological Seminary; Temple University

Academic work
- Discipline: Theology
- Sub-discipline: Christian ethics
- School or tradition: Christian feminism
- Institutions: Episcopal Divinity School

Joan M. Martin is a Protestant feminist theologian. Martin has been politically active with a number of different feminist causes and is notable for her 1978 congressional testimony on behalf of the Equal Rights Amendment.

== Equal Rights Amendment ==
Martin was a member of the Religious Committee for the ERA. Numerous Catholic nuns also belonged to this organization including Sister Mary Luke Tobin. Many women from this organization worked with the National Coalition of American Nuns and National Assembly of Women Religious. The Religious Committee for the ERA was also known as the National Religious Committee for the ERA and worked alongside People of Faith for ERA.

Martin was part of a group of faith-based feminists, including Sonia Johnson from Mormons for ERA, who testified in Congress in support of the ERA in August 1978. Johnson noted in her book, From Housewife to Heretic, Martin was an impressive speaker who "...had immense dignity and presence, and was splendid under interrogation. Also intimidating, to me."

In Martin's testimony, she stated, "To live out our faith and freedom, we must exercise it as whole persons; otherwise it has no meaning. In the context of the ERA ratification process, failure to pass the amendment hinders women from the exercise of our civil rights."

== Publications ==
- Martin, Joan M. (2000). More Than Chains and Toil: A Christian Work Ethic of Enslaved Women. Louisville, KY: Westminster John Knox Press. ISBN 0-664-25800-X.

== Personal life ==
Joan M. Martin is from New York. She was ordained as a minister in the Presbyterian church.

== See also ==
- Elizabeth Farians
- Maureen Fiedler
- Donna Quinn
- Margaret Traxler
- Marjorie Tuite
