= Mormons for ERA =

American Christian feminist organization

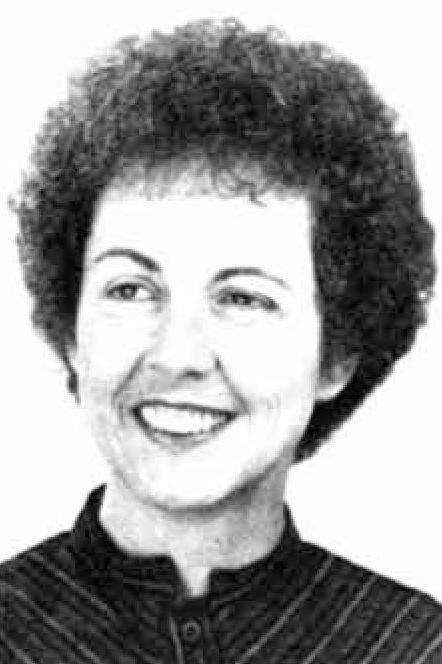
- Formation: 1977
- Location: Sterling, Virginia, U.S.
- President: Sonia Johnson

Mormons for ERA is an American Christian feminist organization that lobbies on behalf of the Equal Rights Amendment (ERA), especially in the 1970s and 1980s. The group was led by Sonia Johnson. It was founded in the late 1970s and continues to the present day as of 2019.

== History of the organization ==
The Church of Jesus Christ of Latter-day Saints (LDS Church) opposed the proposed ERA by 1976. After the church came out in opposition of the wording of the amendment, a group of female members of the LDS Church founded Mormons for ERA in the late 1970s. Marilyn Warenski's book Patriarchs and Politics has been credited with building enthusiasm for this feminist group.

Mormons for ERA was based in Sterling, Virginia under the leadership of Sonia Johnson. Johnson was excommunicated from the LDS Church in 1979 by her bishop, Jeffrey Willis, for her support for the ERA. She served as the first president of this organization when she was elected in 1980. Three other women co-founded the group, including Teddie Wood, a fifth generation church member. Other leaders of the organization included Hazel Davis Rigby and Maida Withers.

According to Johnson, by 1979 Mormons for ERA had over 500 members. The group was especially active between 1977 and 1983. By 1983, it was estimated there were 1,200 members in the organization.

== State chapters ==
=== California ===
In 1980, Audrey McIlwrath served as the coordinator for the group's Southern California chapter. She printed a booklet known as the "Gray Book" outlining the beliefs of the organization after many other printers refused to help with distribution.

=== Washington ===
The state of Washington had an active chapter of Mormons for ERA, with Mary La Brosse as the state coordinator.

== Timeline of political activity ==
=== 1980 ===
In 1980, Johnson chained herself to the church's Seattle Washington Temple to raise awareness for the need for the ERA.

=== 1982 ===
In 1982, a group of women, including Johnson, protested for the ERA when they chained themselves to the Washington D.C. Temple. This action was coordinated with the group Congressional Union in recognition of the group that fought for suffrage during the progressive era.

== List of members ==
- Sonia Johnson
- Mary La Brosse
- Audrey McIlwrath
- Hazel Davis Rigby
- Lee Ann Walker
- Shirley Wallace
- Maida Rust Withers
- Arlene Wood
- Teddie Wood

== Later years ==
As of 2019, Mormons for ERA is still politically active in Utah.

== See also ==
- A Group of Women
- Grassroots Group of Second Class Citizens
- List of former or dissident Mormons
- Zoe Nicholson
