= Zoe Nicholson =

American feminist activist and author

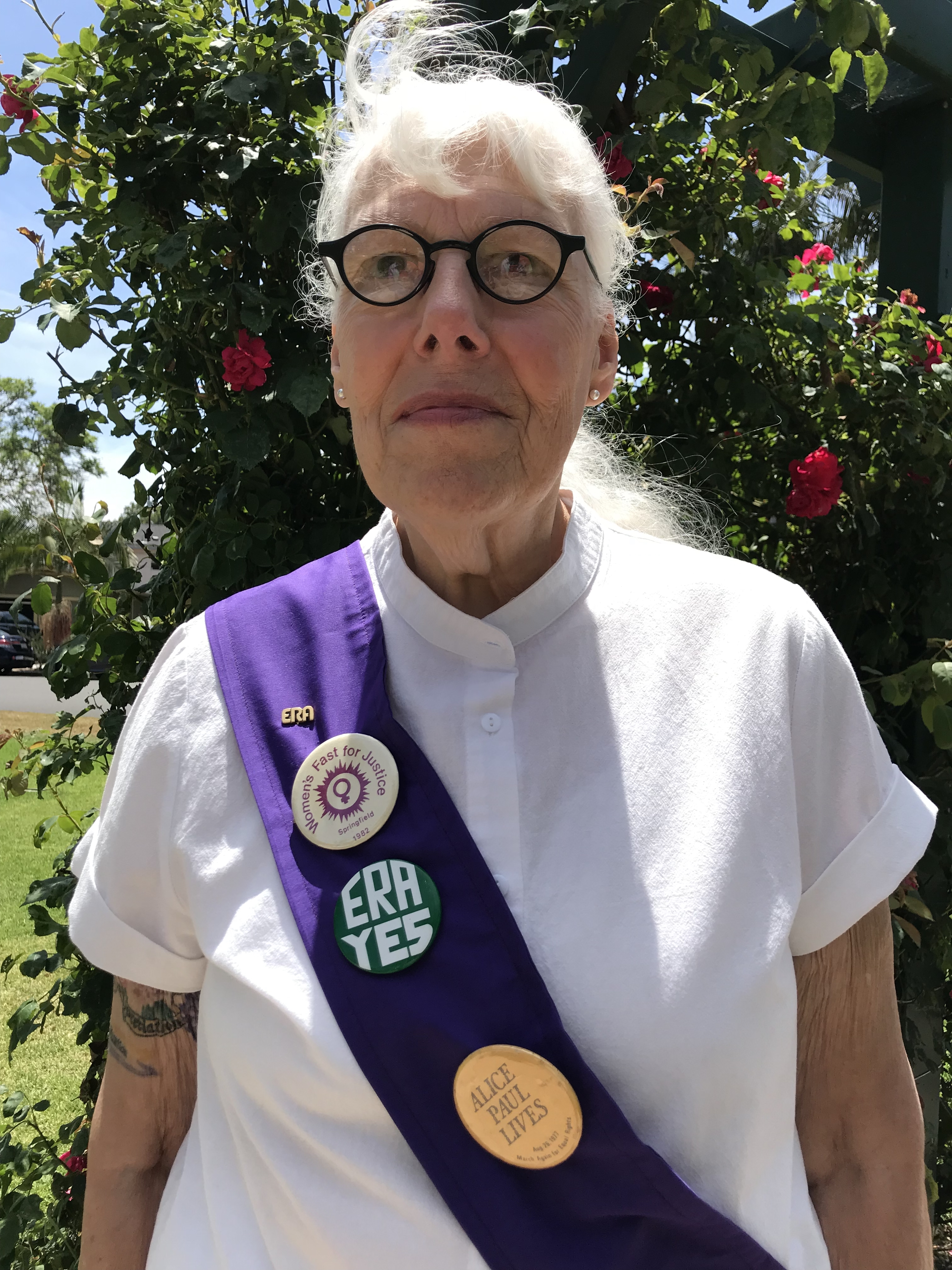
- Zoe Nicholson, women's rights activist and a long time supporter of the Equal Rights Amendment
- Other name: Zoe Ananda
- Education: Quincy University, University of Southern California
- Occupation: Women's Rights Activist
- Years active: 1970s-present
- Organization: National Organization for Women
- Known for: Equal Rights Amendment, feminist activism
- Notable work: The Hungry Heart: A Woman's Fast for Justice
- Movement: Women's Liberation Movement

Zoe Nicholson is an American feminist activist, author, and a longtime member of the National Organization for Women. Openly lesbian, she is known for her work as an independent historian of Alice Paul as well as her role in the campaign for the Equal Rights Amendment.

== Activism and writings ==
=== Feminist work ===
Nicholson is a member of the ERA Roundtable, a lifelong member of the National Organization for Women and a member of the Veteran Feminists of America. In the summer of 2022, Nicholson was awarded a lifetime achievement award from NOW for her contributions to feminism. She is known for her saying, "Suffrage is unfinished business."

=== Publications ===
In 2003, Nicholson published The Passionate Heart, an account of her experiences with Buddhism in the company of the spiritual teacher Frederick Lenz. That same year, she also published Matri, Letters from the Mother which is "a small, very intimate collection of letters from the Divine Mother to the women of the world."

=== LGBTQ+ activism ===
Nicholson is a longtime LGTBQ+ activist and was featured in the gay rights film March On, about the National Equality March 2009, in which she participated. The film premiered September 12, 2010 at the Austin Gay and Lesbian International Film Festival.

In 2010, during a stump speech by President Barack Obama for Senator Barbara Boxer, Nicholson was escorted from the event by Secret Service when she began yelling about issues of equality relating to Don't Ask Don't Tell. The President, noticing the commotion, asked Nicholson, "I’m sorry—do you want to come up here?"

=== Still Working 9 to 5 ===
In 2022, Nicholson was featured in the film Still Working 9 to 5 alongside Jane Fonda, Lilly Tomlin and Dolly Parton.

== Support for the Equal Rights Amendment ==
Nicholson is a longtime supporter of the Equal Rights Amendment. She has marched and lectured on gender equality in support of the amendment for decades.

=== Women Hunger for Justice ===
In 1982, when she was known as Zoe Ananda, Nicholson embarked on a fast in Springfield, Illinois with six other women to convince state legislators in Illinois to ratify the Equal Rights Amendment. This event was known as Women Hunger for Justice. Nicholson and the group attempted to gain support from then Vice President George H.W. Bush when he was scheduled to visit Illinois on June 22 but he rejected their outreach efforts. Other women who participated in non-violent political action in favor of the ERA in Illinois at that time included Georgia Fuller, Berenice Carroll, Mary Lee Sargent and Sonia Johnson. The Women Hunger for Justice event occurred alongside the Day of Rebellion for the ERA. The seven fasters were Nicholson, Sonia Johnson, Shirley Wallace, Mary Barnes, Mary Ann Real, Sister Maureen Fielder and Dina Bachelor.

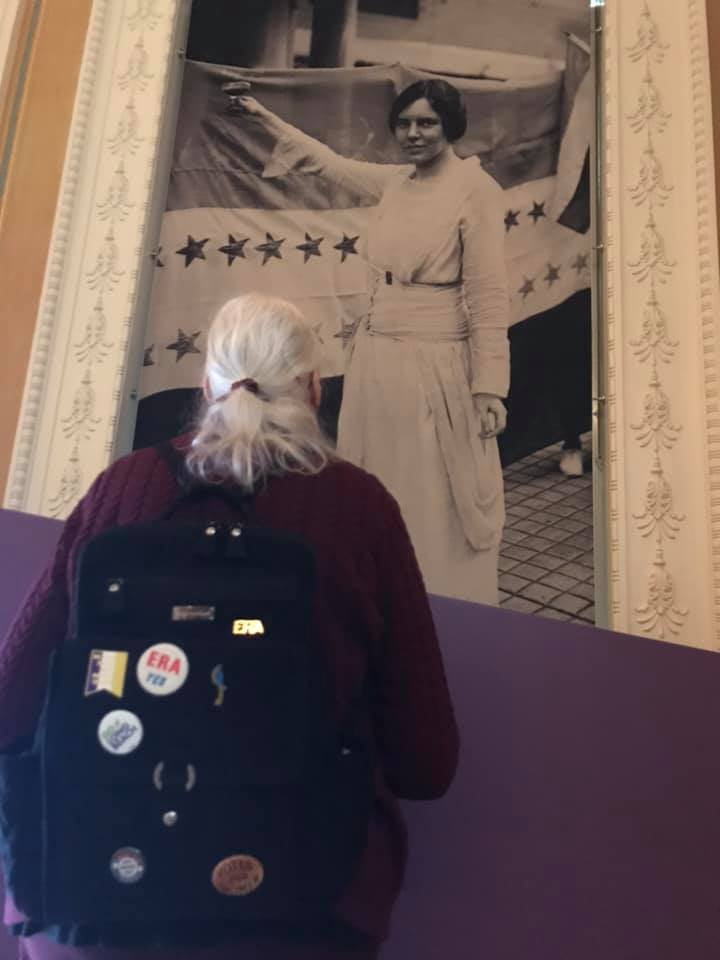
Zoe Nicholson admiring a photo of Alice Paul, the author of the original Equal Rights Amendment

Nicholson approached the fast as spiritual in nature and was quoted in 1982 saying, "My participation in the women's movement is my spiritual life. It's a social gospel when I act out my beliefs through the women's movement." Nicholson has shared in the press that she was willing to die in support of constitutional gender equality.

During the fast, women including Nicholson were stalked and glared at. One cleaning woman working in the building even followed Nicholson into the bathroom and stared directly at her stall. Despite a contentious environment which included a group known as Grassroots Group of Second Class Citizens chaining themselves inside the Illinois Senate chamber, the fast lasted for 37 days. and concluded on June 24, 1982. During the fast, Nicholson was photographed receiving an autography from Phyllis Schlafly, a notable opponent of the ERA. The protest ended with the fasters publicly drinking grape juice out of champagne glasses. In 2004, Nicholson published her memoir of this fast, titled The Hungry Heart: A Woman's Fast for Justice. In 2020, she traveled to Virginia to see that state become the 38th to ratify the ERA.

== Historian of Alice Paul ==
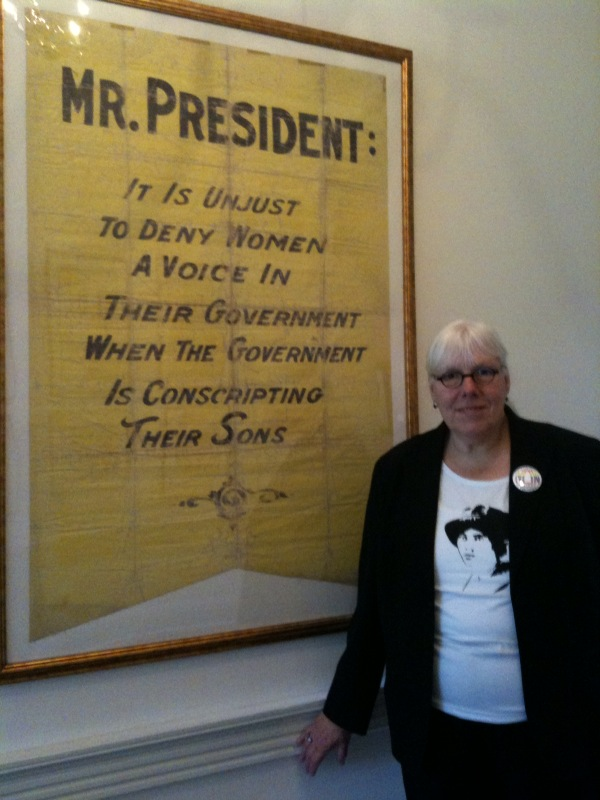
Zoe Nicholson with a National Woman's Party banner

As part of her work to promote the Equal Rights Amendment, Nicholson works as an independent public historian who frequently shares stories about Alice Paul, the author of the original ERA. Nicholson has long maintained a widely read Facebook page where she shares stories and primary sources about Alice Pauls' work for the 19th Amendment and ratification of the ERA. Nicolson has a dozen websites reflecting her diverse interests, including her own blog.

=== Tea with Alice and Me ===
Nicholson has written a one-woman play called, "Tea With Alice and Me" about how Paul has inspired and informed her activism. Nicholson shares this show through her long time partnership with Martha Wheelock's film company, Wild West Women.

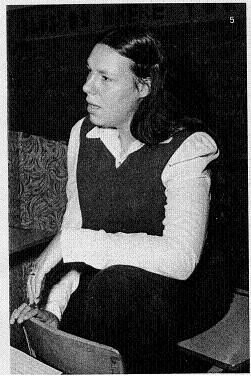
Zoe Nicholson teaching high school

== Personal life ==
Zoe Nicholson was born in Wisconsin in 1948. In the 1970s, Nicholson lived in Newport Beach. She has worked as a systems analyst, production tester, and project leader on Wall Street, as well as co-founding a specialized recruiting firm offering expertise in client/server architecture and graphical design. She also taught religion at a boys high school in Quincy, Illinois.

=== Education ===
Nicholson attended the Academy of the Sacred Heart High School, a school run by the Society of the Sacred Heart (RSCJ) in Lake Forest, Illinois. After high school, she earned a bachelor's degree in Catholic theology from Quincy University in 1969 and a master's degree in ethics and religion from the University of Southern California in 1975.

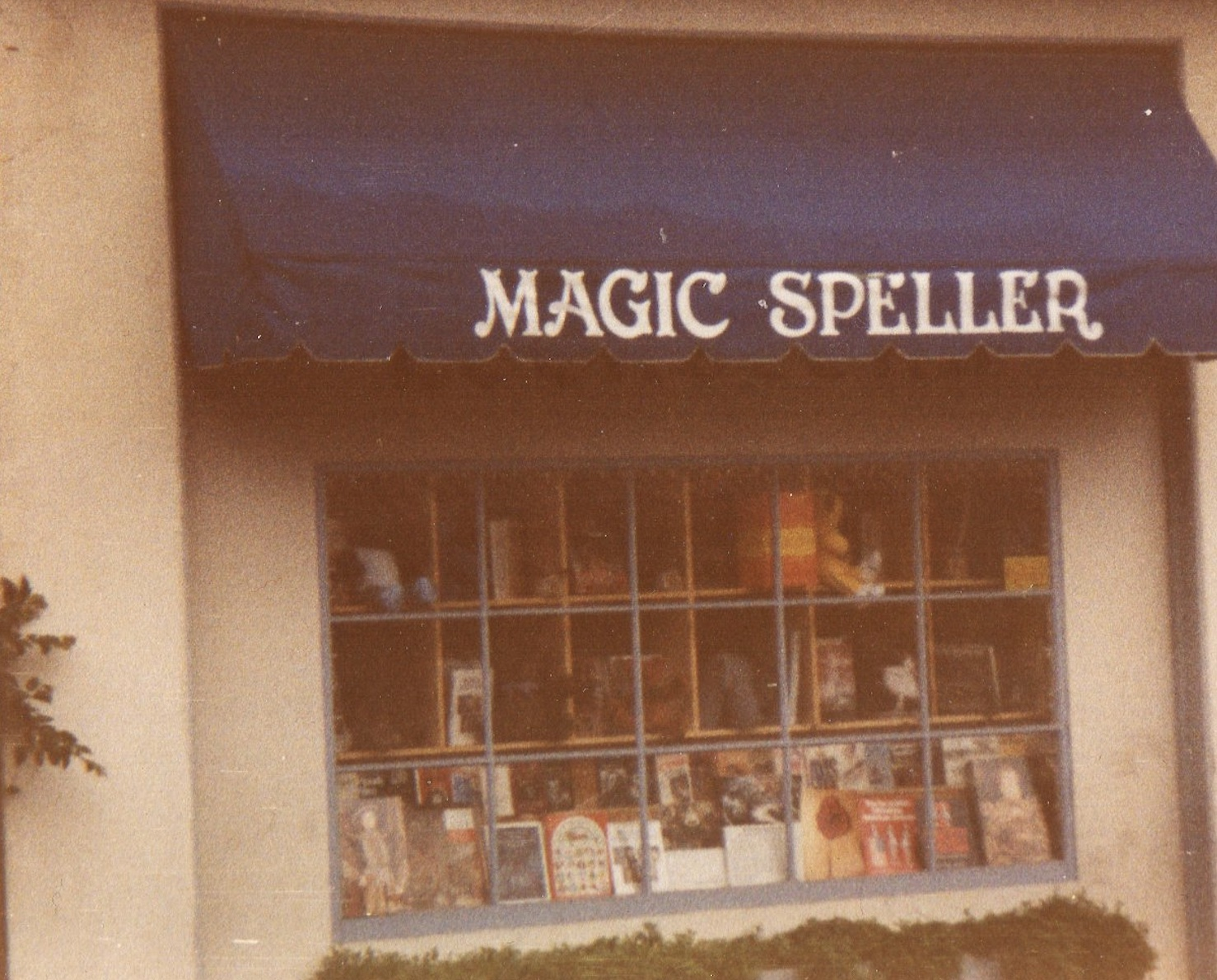
Magic Speller Bookstore

=== Magic Speller bookstore ===
Nicholson left teaching in 1976 to open a women's bookstore in California called Magic Speller Bookstore, which was part of the feminist bookstore movement.

== See also ==
- A Group of Women
- Congressional Union for Women's Suffrage
- Day of Rebellion for the ERA
- Grassroots Group of Second Class Citizens
- Martha Wheelock
- National Woman's Party
