= Mary Lee Sargent =

American feminist activist

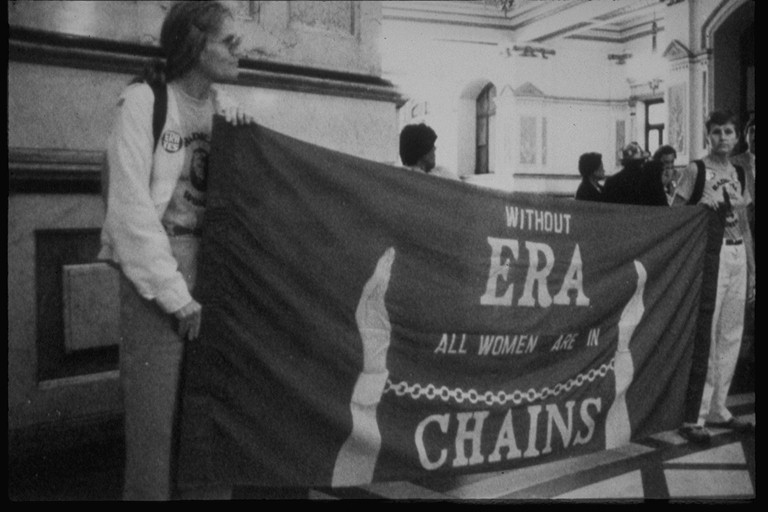
- Occupations: Women's Rights Activist, Professor
- Known for: Advocacy for the Equal Rights Amendment
- Movement: Women's Liberation

Mary Lee Sargent is a professor and feminist activist notable for her direct action political protests on behalf of the Equal Rights Amendment in the early 1980s.

== Leadership of Grassroots Group of Second Class Citizens ==
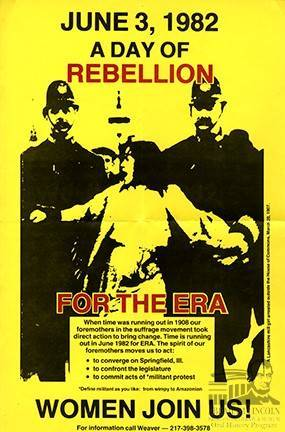
Flyer for the Day of Rebellion for the ERA referencing the British suffragette movement

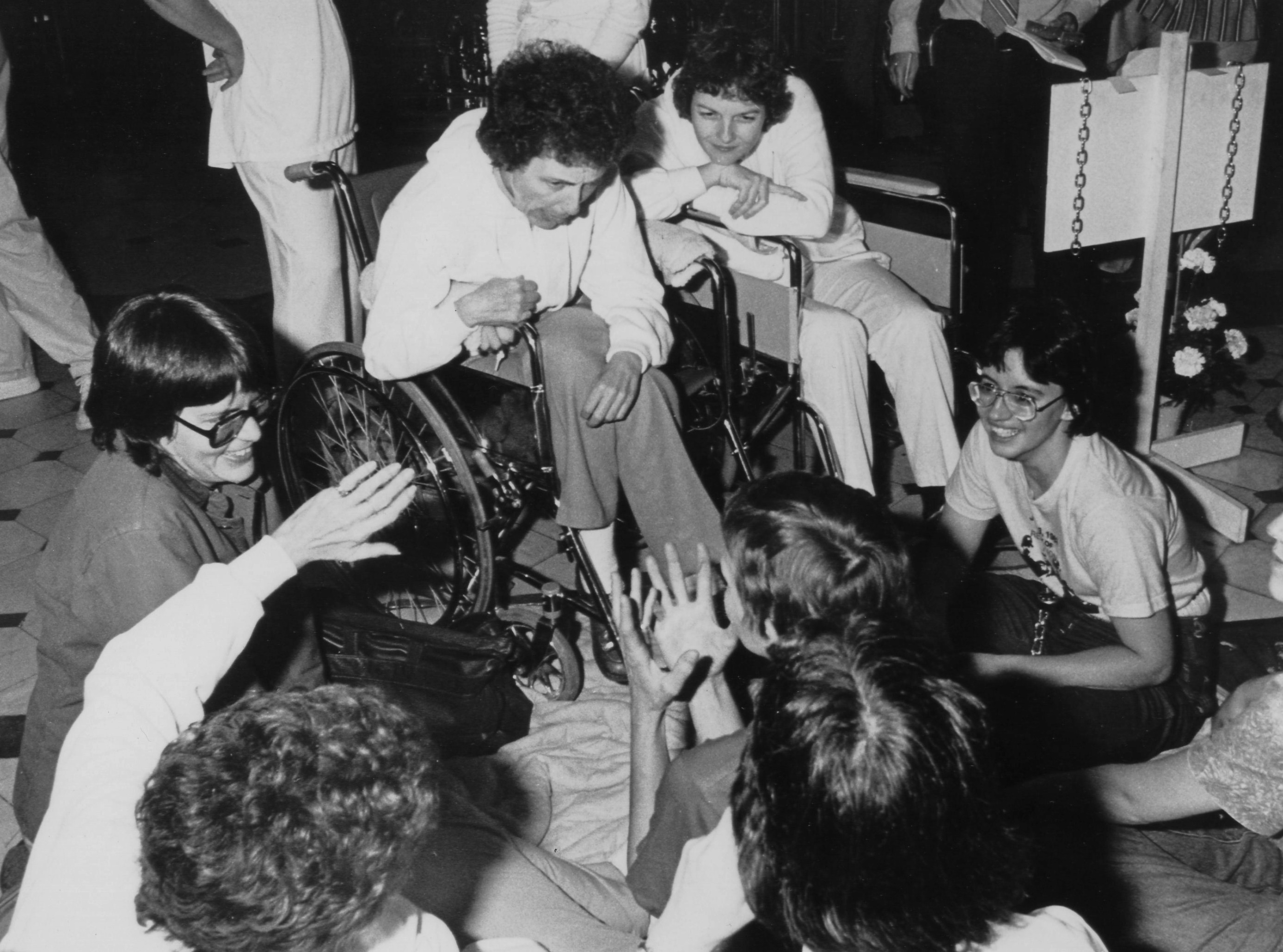
Women Hunger for Justice activists, including Sonia Johnson, meeting with the Grassroots Group of Second Class Citizens

Sargent was a key member of the feminist group Grassroots Group of Second Class Citizens, an organization that supported the ratification of the Equal Rights Amendment (ERA). The group organized a Day of Rebellion in Illinois in 1982 and Sargent served as spokesperson for the group. Sargent was photographed wearing chains outside the Illinois State Senate by Anne Leibowitz and the photo ran in Life Magazine. When Sargent was asked by the press if she was concerned the direct action tactics might turn off some ERA supporters she replied, "It's too late for that...we're here to step up the confrontation." Sargent was photographed in 1982 with Sonia Johnson who was on a long term fast for the ERA at the Illinois state house.

== Support for LGBT rights ==
In 1979, Sargent participated in the first public march for LGBTQ rights in Washington, D.C. In the 1980s, she organized the Lavendar Women's Prairie Women's Center.

== Women Rising in Resistance ==
Sargent was a co-founder of the notable organization Women Rising in Resistance. The group was known for direct action feminist protests. It was created after the defeat of the ERA in Illinois in 1982.

== Personal life ==
Sargent was born in Texas in 1940. In the 1980s she lived in Champaign-Urbanan, Illinois. Sargent was a longtime professor of Women's Studies and History at Parkland College in Illinois. In 1984 she ran for a seat on the board of trustees for the University of Illinois.

In the early 1990s she spent a great deal of time in New Harmony, Indiana and was known for her love of prairie plants. Local residents referred to her as "Prairie Mary."
