= Emma Wong Mar =

California-based political activist and socialist (1926 – 2015)

Emma Wong Mar (September 7, 1926 – September 16, 2015) was a California-based political activist and socialist, best known for her organizing efforts and campaigns for political office with the Peace and Freedom Party.

== Early life ==
Born on September 7, 1926, in New York City's Chinatown, Emma Wong was the fifth of seven daughters born to Chinese immigrant parents. Her father owned a hat-cleaning shop, and her mother was an at-home seamstress. Together, they struggled to support their large family during the Great Depression. Emma attended Julia Richman High School, followed by Hunter College. After graduating, "she spent several years working as a medical technologist at Sutter Hospital in Sacramento, California, and at Planned Parenthood in Oakland. She married Henry Y. Mar, in 1952 and had two children, JoAnn and Craig."

== Activism ==
Emma Wong Mar was highly interested in politics and current affairs. An early opponent of the Vietnam War, she could be seen carrying picket signs at countless protest demonstrations in Sacramento in the early 60s. She later joined the Peace and Freedom Party and was highly active as an organizer, opening her Oakland home for meetings and overnight guests. She was elected State Chair of the party in 1982, and ran as its vice-presidential candidate in 1984 with feminist activist Sonia Johnson as the presidential candidate. Wong Mar was the Peace & Freedom Party's vice-presidential nominee in that year, and was the first Asian-American to run in a national general election for President or Vice-President.

She ran for State Assembly three times between 1982 and 1992 and for U.S. Congress once, in 1994. She served as co-chair of the Alameda County Peace and Freedom Party for many years. Wong Mar continued her anti-war and pro-labor activism well into the late 90s and mid-2000s. In 2001, she was honored with a "Union Heroine" award by the Hotel Employees and Restaurant Employees Union fighting on behalf of low-wage workers in Berkeley.

She struggled with asthma and then with emphysema in her late 80s, and died on September 16, 2015, after a sudden illness.
