= Quixote Center =

The Quixote Center is a social justice group in Maryland founded by Catholic priest William R. Callahan and Dolores "Dolly" Pomerleau in 1976.

== History ==
The Quixote Center achieved prominence in its support of the ideals of the Sandinista government of Nicaragua in the 1980s. The Center raised more than $100 million in humanitarian aid for the Nicaraguan people. Although the Center did not officially take sides during the revolution in Nicaragua, its work was described by The New York Times as "intensely political" and the aid it sent went largely to assist victims of the Contra War. A leader at the Center described U.S. efforts in Nicaragua as a "policy of terrorism." Some critics accused the Center of following a Marxist agenda and the United States Department of the Treasury investigated allegations that Quixote Center had smuggled guns, but no charges were brought and leaders of the Center described the allegations as politically motivated.

The Center has actively opposed the death penalty.

Former New York City Mayor Bill de Blasio worked for the Center in 1988.

== Support for the Equal Rights Amendment ==
In the 1970s and early 1980s, many activists affiliated with the Quixote Center supported the ratification of the Equal Rights Amendment including Sister Maureen Fiedler.

== See also ==
- Catholics Act for Choice
- Donna Quinn
- Margaret Traxler
- Marjorie Tuite
