= Interfaith Voices =

- Genre: Newsmagazine, Talk radio
- Running time: 53 minutes 28 minutes 30 seconds
- Country of origin: USA
- Language: English
- Syndicates: self-distributed
- Hosted by: Maureen Fiedler
- Recording studio: WAMU; Washington, DC
- Original release: 2001 – present
- Opening theme: Mark Stenson, composer
- Website: www.interfaithradio.org

Interfaith Voices is a radio newsmagazine that is syndicated on 69 public and community radio stations in North America. The show features interviews and produced segments covering the world of religion, spirituality, and ethics. It was founded by Maureen Fiedler, who hosted the show from 2001 to 2018. The current host is Amber Khan.

Past guests have included:

- Francis Collins
- Christopher Hitchens
- Anne Rice
- Vinessa Shaw
- Douglas Vakoch
- Ruth Westheimer (Dr. Ruth)
- Rainn Wilson

The show is pre-recorded each week in the studios of 88.5 WAMU at American University.

== See also ==
- List of religion and spirituality podcasts
