= Maureen Fiedler =

American activist

- Occupation: Roman Catholic religious sister
- Years active: 1970s–present
- Organizations: Sisters of Loretto; Catholics Act for ERA
- Known for: Social justice activism
- Movement: Equal Rights Amendment

Maureen Fiedler, SL is an American progressive activist, radio host, and a member of the Sisters of Loretto. She has a long history working with interfaith coalitions on a variety of issues including: social justice, peace, anti-racism work, gender equality, human rights and female ordination in the Catholic Church. She holds a doctorate in Government from Georgetown University. She is the executive producer and host of the radio show Interfaith Voices, which she originated.

== Political work ==
Fiedler finished a doctoral dissertation in 1976 titled "Sex and Political Participation in the United States: A Comparative Analysis of Masses and Elites" which was published by Georgetown University in 1977.

In the 1980s, Fiedler was active in movements for peace in Central America, especially in Nicaragua and El Salvador. In the 1990s, she was active in movements to reform the Catholic Church, both in the United States and internationally.

=== Support for the Equal Rights Amendment ===
Fiedler is a long time supporter of the Equal Rights Amendment. In 1982, Fiedler participated in the Women Hunger for Justice event in support of the ERA alongside seven other women including Sonia Johnson and Zoe Nicholson.

== A Catholic Statement on Pluralism and Abortion ==
In 1984 Fiedler was one of 97 theologians and religious persons who signed A Catholic Statement on Pluralism and Abortion, calling for religious pluralism and discussion within the Church regarding its position on abortion. The Vatican later reported that she had disavowed the statement, but she responded, "I have never retracted or recanted one syllable... I continue to stand behind every word of it without the slightest reservation."

== Women's ordination ==
When Fiedler was involved in an "uncertain venture" regarding women's ordination, Sister Mary Luke Tobin sent her a note saying: "Go out on a limb. That's where the fruit is."

== Publications ==
=== 1990s ===
With Linda Rabben, Fiedler co-authored and co-edited the book Rome Has Spoken: A Guide to Forgotten Papal Statements, and How They Have Changed Through the Centuries, published in 1998.

=== 2006 ===
In 2006, Fiedler provided a chapter in the book, Encyclopedia of Women and Religion in North America; the chapter title was "The Women's Ordination Movement in the Roman Catholic Church".

=== 2010 ===
In 2010, Fiedler published Breaking Through the Stained Glass Ceiling: Women Religious Leaders in Their Own Words, a collection of interviews with women who experienced discrimination in religion. The same year, Fiedler wrote an obituary for William R. Callahan, a priest who advocated greater leadership roles for women in the Catholic Church.

=== 2011 ===
In 2011, Fiedler wrote an obituary for Iris Müller, one of the Danube Seven who were ordained as women priests by Rómulo Antonio Braschi in 2002. Both of Fiedler's memorial pieces ran in the National Catholic Reporter.

== Catholics Act for ERA ==
In the late 1970s and early 1980s Fiedler was actively involved in the struggle to ratify the Equal Rights Amendment (ERA). From 1978-1982 she served as head of the organization Catholics Act for ERA. She founded and directed this organization, and in 1982, was one of eight women who fasted for 37 days in Springfield, IL for ERA ratification. This event was known as the Women's Fast for Justice. Zoe Nicolson, then known as Zoe Ann Ananda, and Sonia Johnson also participated in this fast.

== Interfaith Voices ==
Fiedler has hosted the newsmagazine and talk radio program Interfaith Voices since it debuted in 2002. Starting with just one station, the show has grown to 63 stations in the United States and Canada. The program began as a project of The Quixote Center, a non-sectarian non-profit collective in College Park, Maryland. It later became a separately incorporated non-profit for tax reasons. The program's mission is the promotion of interfaith understanding and religious dialog in the public square. Interfaith Voices was previously called Faith Matters. However, due to a trademark dispute, the name was changed. Faith Matters was the name of a program produced by Reverend Dr. Leith Anderson.

Interfaith Voices has had six producers since it began. Among them are Peter B. Collins, who now owns KRXA-AM in Monterey, California; Paul Woodhull, executive producer of The Bill Press Show; Linda Rabben, University of Maryland; Josephine Reed, host of WPFW-FM radio show On The Margin and a vice president for programming for XM Satellite Radio; John E. Parman; and Laura Kwerel.

== See also ==
- A Group of Women
- Father Anne
- Elizabeth Farians
- Donna Quinn
- Quixote Center
- Margaret Traxler
- Marjorie Tuite
