= Jazz funeral for the ERA =

American public memorial event

A jazz funeral for the Equal Rights Amendment took place in the city of New Orleans, Louisiana [US) on July 3, 1982. The event was a public mourning for the failure of the proposed Amendment to the United States Constitution to be ratified by the required 38 states (3/4 of the 50 states) before the congressionally imposed 1982 deadline.

== ERA history in New Orleans ==
The National Organization for Women hosted a walk in 1981 promoting the passage of the ERA. This event was hosted by the New Orleans ERA Task Force.

== Overview of the event ==
Jazz funerals have a long history in the city of New Orleans. The jazz funeral for the ERA took place one week after the proposed amendment did not pass the required 38 states before the deadline imposed by Congress. It was known as "A New Day Jazz Funeral." The funeral went through the French Quarter. The funeral procession lasted for one hour followed by two hours of speeches. Participants walked by many notable restaurants in New Orleans including Arnaud's Restaurant, The Royal Sonesta Hotel, and the Old Absinth House while musicians played "When the Saints Go Marching In." Numerous boys were photographed participating in this march which was mostly attended by women. The funeral procession ended in Jackson Square. Sue Laporte performed an original song at the end of the procession in front of ERA supporters in Jackson Square.

It was estimated that 500 people attended this march. Many of the marchers dressed in white as suffragists. When asked to describe the purpose of the march Pat Denton, chairwoman of Louisiana's women's political caucus, state, "The tradition of a jazz funeral is that although there is a loss, life goes on and with renewed hope."

== Organizations involved ==
The National Organization for Women sponsored the march and the Baton Rouge National Women's Political Caucus participated as did the Louisiana Lesbian and Gay Political Caucus (LAGPAC).

Supporting organizations included the League of Women Voters, American Civil Liberties Union, NAACP, National Council of Jewish Women and the AFL-CIO.

== Participants ==
- Nikki Alexander
- Pat Denton
- Leonard Doty
- Betty Godso
- Cliff Howard
- Sue Laporte
- Dru Moody
- Laura Peebles
- Virginia Peyton
- Alan Robinson
- Kathi Tomeny
- Cynthia Ware
