= A Group of Women =

American militant feminist organization

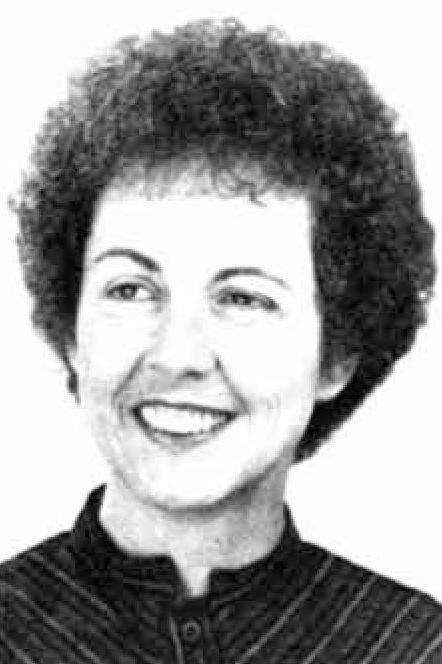
Sonia Johnson

A Group of Women was an American feminist organization in the 1980s that committed a series of actions in support of the ratification of the Equal Rights Amendment. Sonia Johnson was a notable member of this organization that advocated for the use of civil disobedience to raise awareness about the need for the ERA.

== Nonviolent actions ==
Formerly known as the Congressional Union after the suffrage group, A Group of Women advocated for militant actions on behalf of the ERA. They were affiliated with protests including spilling fake blood in front of the National Archives in Washington, D.C. Maureen Fiedler, a Roman Catholic nun, was arrested at this protest. The group drew a significant amount of attention when they blocked traffic in front of the National Archives. Women affiliated with this group held a sign at the protest that read, "Honor Thy Mother. Put Her in the Constitution."

== Members ==
Sonia Johnson, Sister Maureen Fiedler, Mary Hartzler and Mary Ann Beall were all affiliated with A Group of Women. The Des Moines Register reported Johnson was a leader of the organization. Leslie Stewart from Boca Raton, Florida was also a member. She featured prominently in a photo that ran in the Arizona Republic in July 1982, and in an article in the South Florida Sun in April 1983.

== See also ==
- Berenice Carroll
- Day of Rebellion for the ERA
- Grassroots Group for Second Class Citizens
- Georgia Fuller
- Mormons for ERA
