= Women Hunger for Justice =

Women Hunger for Justice was a direct action protest in support of the ratification of the Equal Rights Amendment in Illinois in 1982. The fast received significant attention in the press and included the participation of Sonia Johnson, Sister Maureen Fiedler and Zoe Nicholson.

== Background of the fast ==
The deadline set by Congress to ratify the Equal Rights Amendment was during the summer of 1982. The amendment expired on June 30 of that year so a fast was planned by seven women's rights activists to raise attention for the need for the Illinois state legislature to pass the amendment.

== Overview of the fast ==
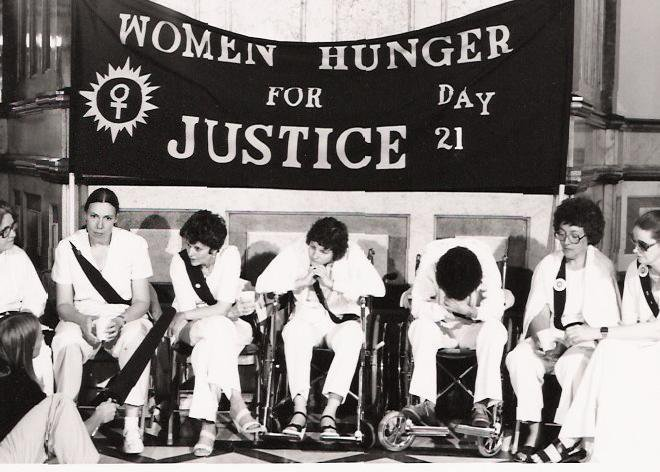
Participants in the Women Hunger for Justice fast

The fast began on May 18, 1982, and lasted 37 days. During the fast there was both taunting by onlookers and concern in the press for the health of the women who participated. Comedian Dick Gregory came by to visit the women for three days and participated in the fast. The fasters were quoted in the press as saying they were symbolic of the "suffering of women that has remained invisible." Documents and images of the fast are held in the archives at Smith College and the Schlesinger Library.

Sr. Maureen Fiedler, a Roman Catholic nun, received a great deal of attention in the press for her participation in the fast. She called the fast a "religious witness." The fast ended on June 24, 1982.

== Support from Gloria Steinem ==
Gloria Steinem paid for a van, known as the "Gloriamobile" to transport the women during the fast.

== National Organization for Women involvement ==
The National Organization for Women paid for rooms for the fasters at a Ramada Inn.

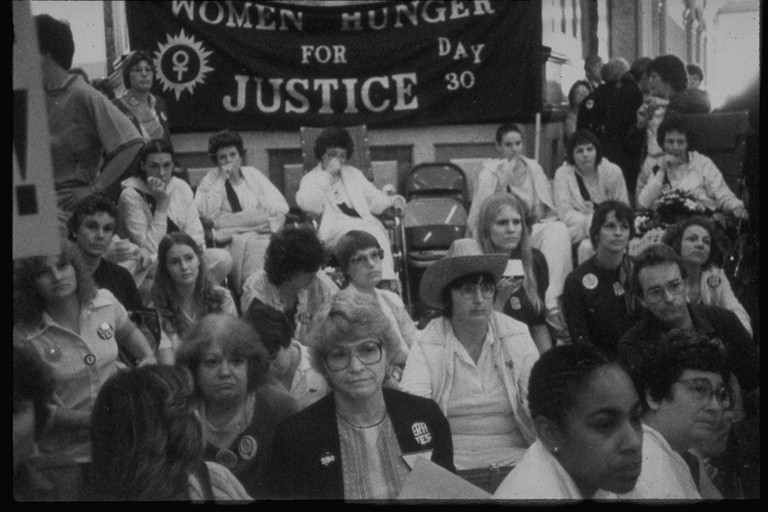
Women Hunger for Justice Rally

== Heath of the fasters ==
Sonia Johnson was very sick during the fast and collapsed on two different occasions. At times she was unable to walk without assistance. Johnson's supporters were worried she was willing to die in support of the ERA.

== Participants ==
Eight women ultimately participated in the Women Hunger for Justice fast. Zoe Nicholson wrote a book about her participation in the fast titled A Hungry Heart: A Woman's Fast for Justice. Women who participated in the fast included

- Mary Barnes
- Dina Bachelor
- Sonia Johnson
- Sister Maureen Fiedler
- Zoe Nicholson
- Mary Ann Beal
- Shirley Wallace

== See also ==
- A Group of Women
- Day of Rebellion for the ERA
- Grassroots Group of Second Class Citizens
