= William R. Callahan (priest) =

American priest (1931–2010)

William Reed Callahan (September 5, 1931 – July 5, 2010) was an American Catholic priest whose activism to change Vatican policy on women's ordination, gay Catholics and social justice led to his expulsion from the Society of Jesus in 1991. He was thereafter forbidden to act as a priest.

Callahan is also known as one of the co-founders of the Quixote Center.

== Social justice work ==
Together with Dolly Pomerleau, he founded the Quixote Center in 1976. During the 1980s, the center raised $100 million towards humanitarian aid to the Sandanista-led government of Nicaragua. During the visit of Pope John Paul II to the United States in 1979, Callahan implored priests "to refuse to help the pope in celebrating Mass" in the hope that "more lay women would then have to be enlisted to assist at the services." After the pope declared that the church's position opposing the ordination of women was not a human rights issue, Callahan wondered that "perhaps this is not a human rights issue because women are not human or they do not have rights". In a 1980 article in The New York Times title "Equal Rights on the Altar of God", Callahan opined that the church's policy against the ordination of women was driven by the desire among the exclusively male clergy for power, which is "sexually satisfying [with] a certain act of love and passion all its own, and priests cherish it as one game they can play", questioning "why should they share their little playing field" with women?

== Conflict with the Catholic Church ==
These public challenges to Roman Catholic teaching led to a rebuke from the Church in 1979 and a removal from his post in Washington, D.C. In an April 1989 press conference, Callahan stated that he had been told he would be dismissed by the Jesuits if he didn't drop his activities with the Quixote Center and the groups Priests for Equality and Catholics Speak Out that it sponsors. Callahan stated that Jesuit officials would not disclose the reasons for his ouster. He received two formal canonical warning in May 1989, was ordered to desist from his activities at the Quixote Center and to cease his activities on behalf of Nicaragua and was asked by Superior General of the Society of Jesus Peter Hans Kolvenbach to refrain from making any "embarrassing" and "controversial" statements. His activities on behalf of gay Catholics, the ordination of women and on behalf of social justice in Nicaragua led to his eventual expulsion from the Jesuit order in 1991. Forbidden to act as a priest, he continued to be called "Father" or "Reverend" and continued his ministry to dissident Catholics. Callahan insisted that he was simply "following the example of Jesus, who was never willing to shut up".

== Personal life ==
Callahan was born in Scituate, Massachusetts on September 5, 1931. He was raised as a Catholic by his father's parents following the death of his mother when Callahan was 6 months old. He attended Boston College High School and joined the Society of Jesus in 1948. Callahan had originally intended to pursue training in agronomy, but was convinced to pursue education in physics as the Jesuits needed additional physics professors for the colleges in the Jesuit system. He attended Boston College, where he earned bachelor's and master's degrees in physics, and earned his Ph.D. in the subject in 1962 from Johns Hopkins University. After completing college, he taught at the Jesuit-operated Fairfield University and received his ordination as a priest in 1965.

A resident of Brentwood, Maryland, Callahan died at age 78 on July 5, 2010, due to complications of Parkinson's disease. He married Dolly Pomerleau, his long-time colleague, in the days before his death.
