= Day of Rebellion for the ERA =

1982 event for Equal Rights Amendment in Illinois, USA

The Day of Rebellion for the ERA was an event in 1982 organized by activists in support of the Equal Rights Amendment during the final struggle for ratification in Illinois.

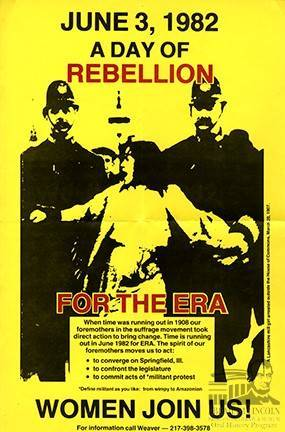
A flyer promoting the Day of Rebellion

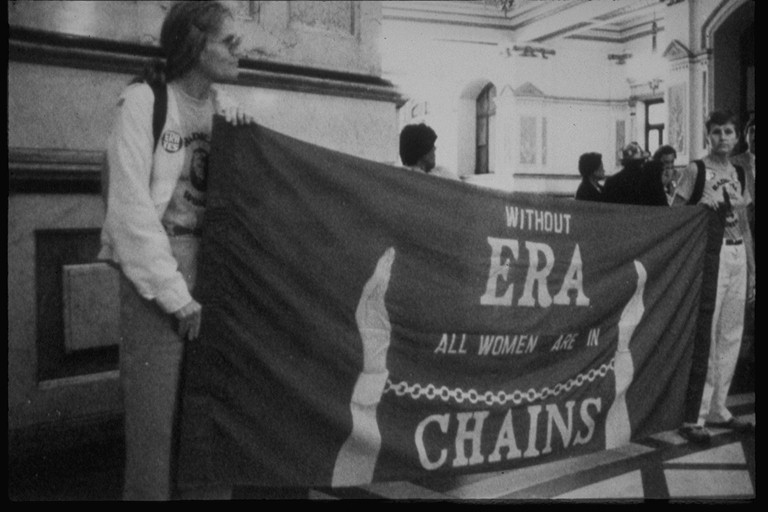
Mary Lee Sargent holding a pro-Equal Rights Amendment banner

== Overview of the event ==
The Day of Rebellion occurred on June 3, 1982. It was modeled after the militant wing of the women's suffrage movement and organized a group known as A Grassroots Group of Second Class Citizens. Direction action activities included the women chaining themselves to the entrance of the Senate chamber. Participant May Lee Sargent from Champaign, Illinois said, "In the suffrage movement, this is called a militant demonstration." The group occupied the capital for four days. Some of the women even slept in their chains.

Roughly 200 people took part in this direction action. The women loudly encouraged legislators to free them from discrimination based on sex. They chanted "equality now, break our chains" and "we want ERA." This demonstration took place alongside a fast known as Women Hunger for Justice.

== Participants ==
17 people participated in this event. Active participants included:

- Berenice Carroll
- Pauline Kayes
- Kari Alice Lynn
- Loretta Manning
- Mary Lee Sargent
