= Grassroots Group of Second Class Citizens =

Political organization

- Formation: 1981
- Dissolved: 1993
- Type: Feminist
- Purpose: Activist group for the Equal Rights Amendment and reproductive rights
- Headquarters: Illinois
- Key people: Berenice Carroll, Mary Lee Sargent

Grassroots Group of Second Class Citizens was a political organization of feminist women created in the early 1980s to undertake non-violent direct action tactics to raise awareness for the need of an Equal Rights Amendment. The group also advocated for reproductive rights and lasted throughout the 1980s.

== Actions at the Illinois State House ==
Grassroots Group of Second Class Citizens were especially known for their direct actions at the Illinois State House in 1982. One of the grandmothers of a founder, Mary Lee Sargent, was a suffragist. Sargent co-founded this group while teaching at Parkland Community College in Illinois. The group included a wide range of activists from eighteen year old Sue Yarber to Berenice Carroll who was in her late 40s. In 1982, the ERA was set to expire and both pro and anti-ERA groups descended upon the Capitol in Illinois to lobby state legislators. Members of the Grassroots Group of Second Class Citizens were often referred to as a chain gang because they had chained themselves together inside the capitol.

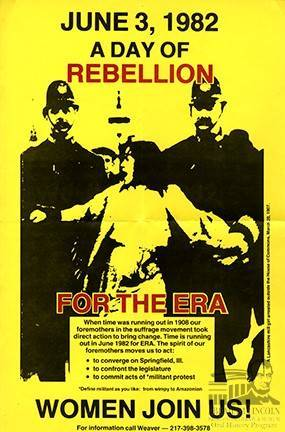
A flyer promoting the Day of Rebellion in support of the Equal Rights Amendment

== Day of Rebellion for ERA ==
One of the most notable actions undertaken by Grassroots Group of Second Class Citizens was known as their Day of Rebellion for the ERA on June 3, 1982. That day, 17 women chained themselves inside the Illinois State Capitol. According to the Macon Telegraph, "When asked if they were worried the sit-in might alienate ERA supporters, Mary Lee Sargent...said, 'It's too late for that...we're here to step up the confrontation." Sargent noted this action had connections to the militant actions of the women's suffrage movement. She said, "It's our willingness to put our bodies out here, to be a spectacle and to be laughed at by people...but to face people directly."

The Grassroots Group of Second Class Citizens refused to leave the Capitol and members spent four nights in jail. Anne Casey-Elder, a member of the group was quoted as saying, "Nobody has ever occupied a capitol building like this." A photo of the women in chains appeared in Life magazine in 1982.

== Spilling animal blood ==
The group then sprayed animal blood inside the capitol to symbolize the death of the ERA. They were ordered to pay more than $2,000 in cleanup fees. Mary Lee Sargent felt the fine was unfair and said, "We are being asked to pay thousands of dollars for protesting. I would have felt fine paying the cleanup costs. But it did not cost $2,300 to clean up.

== Women Hunger for Justice ==
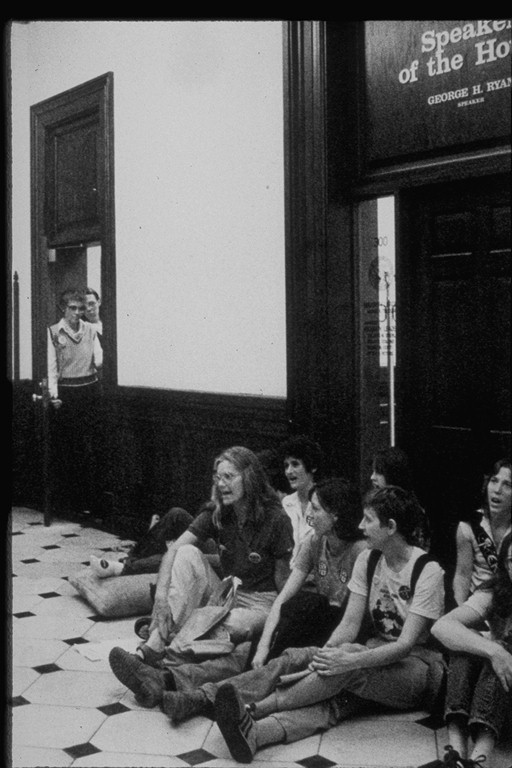
Members of the Grassroots Group of Second Class Citizens sitting in front of the office of the Speaker of the House in Illinois in 1982

Grassroots Group of Second Class Citizens were politically active at the same time and place when another group of women fasted for the ERA in Illinois in 1982. This event was known as Women Hunger for Justice. Both groups expressed solidarity for one another in the press. Fasters included longtime women's rights activists Zoe Nicholson and Sonia Johnson.

== Later years ==
After the failure of the ERA campaign, Grassroots Group for Second Class Citizens continued to be politically active as they advocated for a variety of feminist causes including for abortion rights. In 1982, the group undertook an action where they posed as "witches" while holding a mock trial of legislators. In 1984, Sargent ran for a seat on the Board of Trustees for the University of Illinois-Champaign. The group finally disbanded in 1993.

== Members of the Grassroots Group of Second Class Citizens ==
- Berenice Carroll
- Anne Casey-Elder
- Kari Alice Lynn
- Loretta Manning
- Page Mellish
- Joyce Meyer
- Caroline Plank
- Mary Lee Sargent
- Alice Weber
- Marlena Williams
- Sue Yarber

== See also ==
- Catholics Act for ERA
- Georgia Fuller
- Sonia Johnson
- Zoe Nicholson
