= Sonia Johnson =

American activist and writer

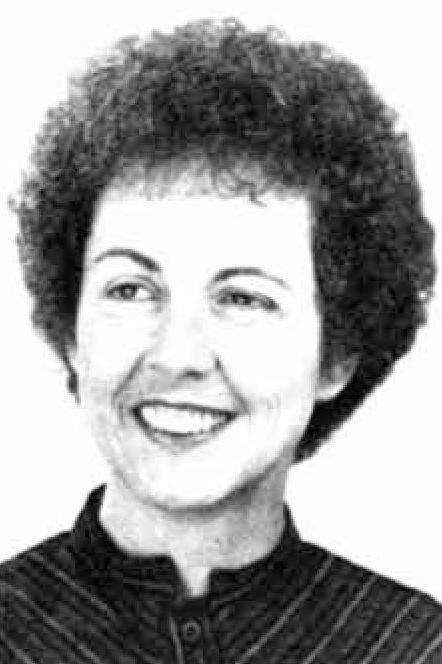
- Born: Sonia Ann Harris; February 27, 1936 (age 90); Malad, Idaho, US
- Education: Utah State University; Rutgers College
- Occupations: Feminist activist and writer
- Known for: Supporter of the Equal Rights Amendment, excommunicated by LDS Church
- Spouse: Rick Johnson (divorced)
- Partner: Jade DeForest (born Jean Tait)
- Children: 4

Sonia Ann Johnson, (née Harris; born February 27, 1936) is an American feminist activist and writer. She was an outspoken supporter of the Equal Rights Amendment (ERA) and in the late 1970s was publicly critical of the position of the Church of Jesus Christ of Latter-day Saints (LDS Church), of which she was a member, against the proposed amendment. She was eventually excommunicated from the church for her activities. She went on to publish several radical feminist books, ran for president in 1984, and become a popular feminist speaker.

== Early life, education, and family ==
Sonia Ann Harris, born in Malad, Idaho, was a fifth-generation Mormon. She attended Utah State University and married Rick Johnson following graduation. She earned a master's degree and a Doctor of Education from Rutgers College. She was employed as a part-time teacher of English in universities both in the United States and abroad, following her husband to new places of employment. She had four children during these years. They returned to the United States in 1976.

In 1991, Johnson's mother, Ida Harris, became worried about her daughter's safety after hearing rumors of Sonia's death and receiving telephone threats against her daughter. Taking the threats to heart, Ida moved to Sonia's Wildfire Community in November 1991. Six months later, Ida died at the age of 86 with Sonia by her side. Ida was buried in Logan, Utah, but Sonia did not attend the funeral because she had promised her mother not to return to Utah.

== LDS Church and ERA ==
Johnson began speaking out in support of the ERA in 1977 and with three other women, co-founded an organization called Mormons for ERA. National exposure occurred with her 1978 testimony in front of the United States Senate Judiciary Subcommittee on the Constitution, Civil Rights and Property Rights, and she continued speaking and promoting the ERA and denouncing the LDS Church's opposition to the amendment. Faith-based feminist Joan M. Martin also testified during this committee hearing.

The LDS Church began disciplinary proceedings against Johnson after she delivered a scathing speech entitled "Patriarchal Panic: Sexual Politics in the Mormon Church" at a meeting of the American Psychological Association (APA) in New York City in September 1979. Johnson denounced as immoral and illegal the LDS Church's nationwide lobbying efforts to prevent passage of the ERA.

Because the speech drew national media attention, leaders in Johnson's local Virginia congregation, including stake president Earl J. Roueche, immediately began excommunication proceedings. A December 1979 excommunication letter stated that Johnson was charged with a variety of misdeeds, including hindering the worldwide missionary program, damaging internal church social programs, and teaching false doctrine. Her husband divorced her in October 1979, two months before the proceeding. She attributed his decision to "some kind of mid-life crisis."

After her break with the church, Johnson continued promoting the ERA, speaking on television and at numerous functions throughout the country, including the 1980 Democratic National Convention. She also protested venues such as the Republican Party headquarters in Washington, D.C. She and twenty ERA supporters were briefly jailed for chaining themselves to the gate of the Seattle Washington Temple in Bellevue, Washington.

In the summer of 1982, Johnson led seven other women from around the country in a dramatic public hunger strike in Springfield, Illinois. The group targeted Illinois because it was the only Northern industrial state that hadn't ratified the ERA. During the Women Hunger for Justice fast, the feminist activists kept daily vigils in the rotunda of the capitol, but the amendment eventually failed in the Illinois House on June 22. The group broke its 37-day, water-only fast with a round of grape juice. In the 1980s, she was also affiliated with the feminist group known as A Group of Women. In 1982, the American Humanist Association awarded her the Humanist Heroine Award.

== Citizens Party presidential candidate ==
Johnson ran in the 1984 presidential election, as the candidate of the U.S. Citizens Party, Pennsylvania's Consumer Party, and California's Peace and Freedom Party. Johnson received 72,161 votes (0.08%) finishing fifth. Her running mate for the Citizens Party was Richard Walton and for the Peace and Freedom Party Emma Wong Mar. Mark Dunlea, assistant campaign manager for her campaign, later wrote a book about a fictional female American president, Madame President: The Unauthorized Biography of the First Green Party President.

Johnson also founded Wildfire, a short-lived separatist commune for women that disbanded in 1993. She published several of her later books under the imprint "Wildfire Books."

== Publications and personal views ==
Johnson became increasingly radicalized, especially against state power, as reflected in the books she published after 1987. They include:

- From Housewife to Heretic (Doubleday, 1981)
- Telling the Truth (pamphlet, Crossing Press, 1987)
- Going Out of Our Minds: The Metaphysics of Liberation (Crossing Press, 1987)
- Wildfire: Igniting the She/Volution (Wildfire Books, 1990)
- The Ship that Sailed Into the Living Room: Sex and Intimacy Reconsidered (Wildfire Books, 1991)
- Out of This World: A Fictionalized True-Life Adventure (Wildfire Books, 1993)
- The SisterWitch Conspiracy (CreateSpace Independent Publishing Platform, 2010)

In Going Out of Our Minds Johnson details the personal and political experiences that turned her against the state, including her run for the Presidency. In the book she rejects the Equal Rights Amendment, the Supreme Court's Roe v. Wade decision, equal opportunity laws, and other government benefits because she considers them cooptation by patriarchy.

In Wildfire Johnson elaborates on her beliefs and answers her many critics in and out of the feminist movement. Her bottom line argument is that state violence is male violence and that women relate to the male-dominated state much as women relate to battering husbands who alternately abuse and reward their wives to keep them under control. She compares both relationships to the Stockholm syndrome in which hostages develop an emotional attachment to their captors.

In chapter three of Wildfire, entitled "The Great Divorce," Johnson writes: "I have heard women involved in male politics say about our political system almost the same words I have heard battered women use about their abusers: 'Of course our government isn't perfect, but where is there a better one? With all its faults, it is still the best system (husband) in the world.' Like a battered wife, they never think to ask the really relevant questions: who said we needed a husband, or a husband-state, at all?"

During this time Johnson also declared herself a lesbian and began a relationship with a woman. After ending that relationship, she wrote in The Ship that Sailed Into the Living Room that even relationships between female couples are a dangerous patriarchal trap, because "two is the ideal number for inequality, for sadism, for the reproduction of patriarchy", and that relationships are "slave Ships" (a concept from which she derived the title of the book).

"Nearly four years after I began my rebellion against relation/sex/slave Ships," she wrote, "experience and my Wise Old Woman are telling me that sex as we know it is a patriarchal construct and has no rightful, natural place in our lives, no authentic function or ways. Synonymous with hierarchy/control, sex is engineered as part of the siege against our wholeness and power."

In the self-published The SisterWitch Conspiracy, Johnson imagines a world in which men do not exist at all, inspired by her belief that "as long as men were on the planet, neither peace nor justice would ever be possible."

== Personal life ==
As of 2007, Johnson lived in New Mexico with partner Jade DeForest, where they ran Casa Feminista, a hotel catering to feminist women. She was also a featured speaker at the 2007 Feminist Hullabaloo activist gathering.

The couple now resides in Tucson, Arizona.

By 1992, Johnson had stopped identifying as a lesbian. In January 2019, Johnson clarified that she was "disillusioned" about men, but "had never had sexual feelings for women." Nonetheless, she has made the choice to dedicate her attention to women because she finds men to be "boring" and "predictable" and "not as wonderful as women."

== See also ==
- A Group of Women
- Grassroots Group of Second Class Citizens
- Mormon feminism
- Zoe Nicholson

Party political offices
Preceded by Barry Commoner	Citizens Party nominee for President of the United States; 1984	Succeeded by —
