= Equal Rights Amendment =

Proposed amendment to the U.S. Constitution

The Equal Rights Amendment (ERA) is a proposed amendment to the United States Constitution that would explicitly prohibit sex discrimination. It is not currently a part of the Constitution, though its ratification status has long been debated. It was written by Alice Paul and Crystal Eastman and first introduced in Congress in December 1923. With the rise of the women's movement in the United States during the 1960s, the ERA garnered increasing support, and, after being reintroduced by Representative Martha Griffiths in 1971, it was approved by the U.S. House of Representatives that year, and by the U.S. Senate in 1972, thus submitting the ERA to the state legislatures for ratification, as provided by Article Five of the United States Constitution. A seven-year (1979) deadline was included with the legislation by Congress. A simple majority of Congress later extended the deadline to 1982. Both deadlines passed with the ERA three short of the necessary 38 states for ratification. Even so, there are ongoing efforts to ratify the amendment. Shortly before leaving office, President Joe Biden controversially declared the ERA to be binding as the 28th Amendment to the Constitution, but this proclamation did not actually lead to any formal recognition of it as such.

The purpose of the ERA is to guarantee equal legal rights for all American citizens regardless of sex. In the early history of the Equal Rights Amendment, middle-class women were largely supportive, while those speaking for the working class were often opposed, arguing that women should hold more domestic responsibility than men and that employed women needed special protections regarding working conditions and employment hours. Proponents asserted it would end legal distinctions between men and women in matters including divorce, property, and employment. Opponents have argued that it would remove protections from women and open women to be drafted into the military.

== Resolution text ==
The resolution, "Proposing an amendment to the Constitution of the United States relative to equal rights for men and women", reads:

Resolved by the Senate and House of Representatives of the United States of America in Congress assembled (two-thirds of each House concurring therein), That the following article is proposed as an amendment to the Constitution of the United States, which shall be valid to all intents and purposes as part of the Constitution when ratified by the legislatures of three-fourths of the several States within seven years from the date of its submission by the Congress:

"ARTICLE —

"Section 1. Equality of rights under the law shall not be denied or abridged by the United States or by any State on account of sex.

"Section 2. The Congress shall have the power to enforce, by appropriate legislation, the provisions of this article.

"Section 3. This amendment shall take effect two years after the date of ratification."

== History ==
=== Early history (1920s–1940s) ===
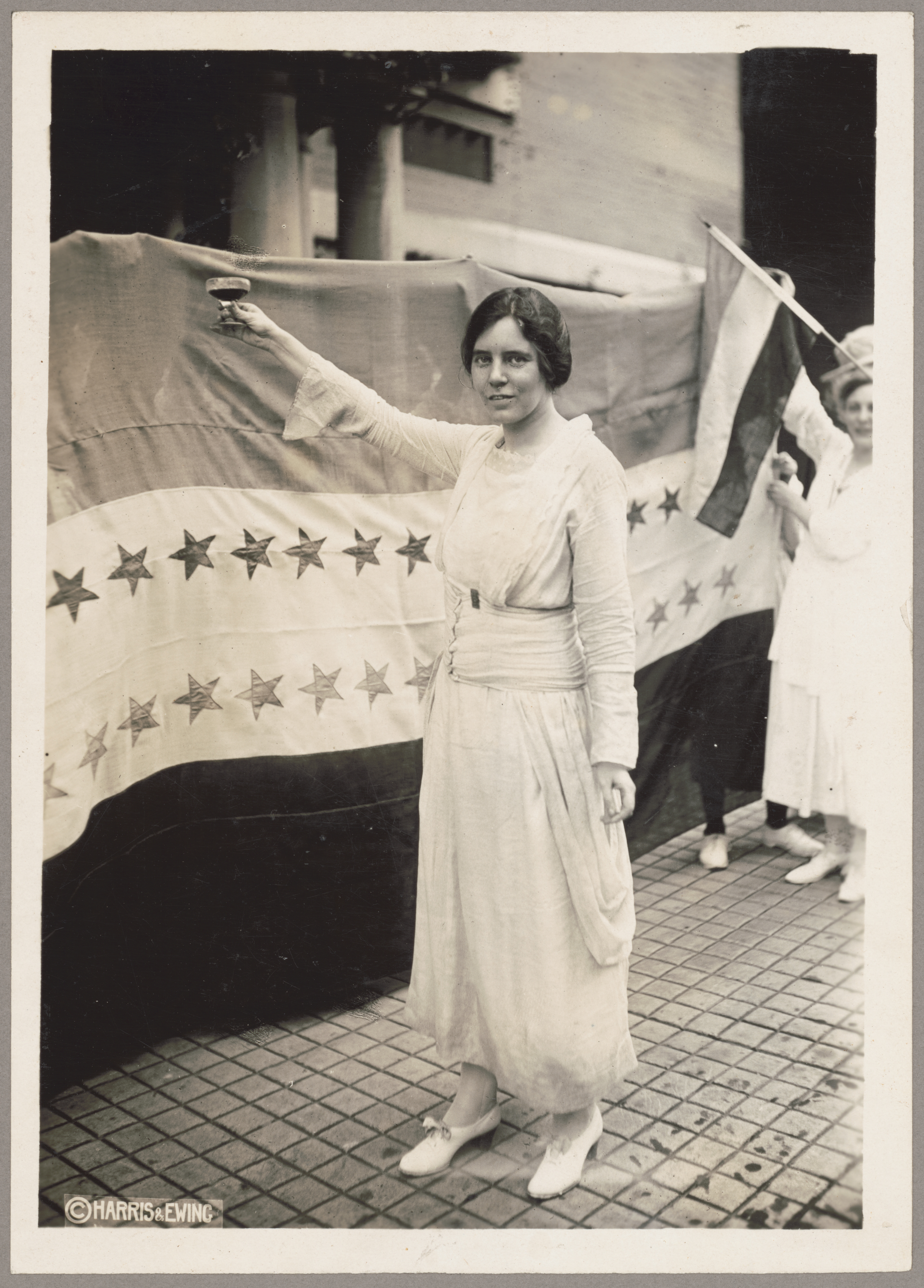
Alice Paul toasting (with grape juice) the passage of the Nineteenth Amendment, August 26, 1920

On September 25, 1921, the National Woman's Party announced its plans to campaign for an amendment to the U.S. Constitution to guarantee women equal rights with men. The text of the proposed amendment read:

Section 1. No political, civil, or legal disabilities or inequalities on account of sex or on account of marriage, unless applying equally to both sexes, shall exist within the United States or any territory subject to the jurisdiction thereof.

Section 2. Congress shall have power to enforce this article by appropriate legislation.

Alice Paul, the head of the National Women's Party, believed that the Nineteenth Amendment would not be enough to ensure that men and women were treated equally regardless of sex. In 1923, at Seneca Falls, New York, she revised the proposed amendment to read:

Men and women shall have equal rights throughout the United States and every place subject to its jurisdiction. Congress shall have power to enforce this article by appropriate legislation.

Paul named this version the Lucretia Mott Amendment, after a female abolitionist who fought for women's rights and attended the First Women's Rights Convention. The proposal was seconded by Dr. Frances Dickinson, a cousin of Susan B. Anthony.

Following its introduction in 1923, the Equal Rights Amendment was reintroduced in each subsequent Congress, but made little progress.

In 1943, Alice Paul further revised the amendment to reflect the wording of the Fifteenth and Nineteenth Amendments. This text would later become Section 1 of the version passed by Congress in 1972.

As a result of this revision, ERA opponents proposed an alternative in the 1940s. This alternative provided that "no distinctions on the basis of sex shall be made except such as are reasonably justified by differences in physical structure, biological differences, or social function." It was quickly rejected by both pro- and anti-ERA coalitions.

When the Fourteenth Amendment to the United States Constitution was adopted in 1868, the Equal Protection Clause, which guarantees equal protection of the laws, did not apply to women. It was not until 1972 that the United States Supreme Court extended equal protection to sex-based discrimination. However, women have never been entitled to full equal protection as the Court subsequently ruled that statutory or administrative sex classifications were subject to an intermediate standard of judicial review, a less stringent standard than that applied to other forms of discrimination.

==== Split among feminists ====
Since the 1920s, the Equal Rights Amendment has been accompanied by discussion among feminists about the meaning of women's equality. Alice Paul and her National Woman's Party asserted that women should be on equal terms with men in all regards, even if that means sacrificing benefits given to women through protective legislation, such as shorter work hours and no night work or heavy lifting. Opponents of the amendment, such as the Women's Joint Congressional Committee, believed that the loss of these benefits to women would not be worth the supposed gain to them in equality. In 1924, The Forum hosted a debate between Doris Stevens and Alice Hamilton concerning the two perspectives on the proposed amendment. Their debate reflected the wider tension in the developing feminist movement of the early 20th century between two approaches toward gender equality. One approach emphasized the common humanity of women and men, while the other stressed women's unique experiences and how they were different from men, seeking recognition for specific needs. The opposition to the ERA was led by Mary Anderson and the Women's Bureau beginning in 1923. These feminists argued that legislation including mandated minimum wages, safety regulations, restricted daily and weekly hours, lunch breaks, and maternity provisions would be more beneficial to the majority of women who were forced to work out of economic necessity, not personal fulfillment. The debate also drew from struggles between working class and professional women. Alice Hamilton, in her speech "Protection for Women Workers", said that the ERA would strip working women of the small protections they had achieved, leaving them powerless to further improve their condition in the future, or to attain necessary protections in the present.

The National Woman's Party already had tested its approach in Wisconsin, where it won passage of the Wisconsin Equal Rights Law in 1921. The party then took the ERA to Congress, where U.S. senator Charles Curtis, a future vice president of the United States, introduced it for the first time in October 1921. Although the ERA was introduced in every congressional session between 1921 and 1972, it almost never reached the floor of either the Senate or the House for a vote. Instead, it was usually blocked in committee; except in 1946, when it was defeated in the Senate by a vote of 38 to 35—not receiving the required two-thirds supermajority.

=== Post-World War II developments (1940s–1960s) ===
World War II was correlated with a rise in supporters of the ERA. Due to the war, many women had to take on untraditional roles at home and in the workforce. Protectionists were against the ERA because they believed women need to be treated differently than men, because they are biologically different. Women entered the workforce and proved they could handle working the same jobs as men, including joining the U.S. Armed Forces. Women were supporting their country, despite not being compensated or respected fairly. With the increased patriotism in the country people began to see the value of women being involved in their country. As the war continued, more opportunities for women to work opened up due to fewer men being available. The support for equality grew with this as women continued to prove their ability and willingness to work.

==== Initial support from the Republican Party and the Hayden rider ====
The Republican Party included support of the ERA in its platform beginning in 1940, renewing the plank every four years until 1980. The main support base for the ERA until the late 1960s was among middle class Republican women, while some Southern Democrats also supported it.

In 1950 and 1953, the ERA was passed by the Senate with a provision known as "the Hayden rider", introduced by Arizona senator Carl Hayden. The Hayden rider added a sentence to the ERA to keep special protections for women: "The provisions of this article shall not be construed to impair any rights, benefits, or exemptions now or hereafter conferred by law upon persons of the female sex." By allowing women to keep their existing and future special protections, it was expected that the ERA would be more appealing to its opponents. Though opponents were marginally more in favor of the ERA with the Hayden rider, supporters of the original ERA believed it negated the amendment's original purpose—causing the amendment not to be passed in the House.

ERA supporters were hopeful that the second term of President Dwight Eisenhower would advance their agenda. Eisenhower had publicly promised to "assure women everywhere in our land equality of rights," and in 1958, Eisenhower asked a joint session of Congress to pass the Equal Rights Amendment, the first president to show such a level of support for the amendment. However, the National Woman's Party found the amendment to be unacceptable and asked it to be withdrawn whenever the Hayden rider was added to the ERA.

==== Initial opposition from the New Deal Democrats ====
Eleanor Roosevelt and most New Dealers opposed the ERA. They felt that ERA was designed for middle-class women, but that working-class women needed government protection. They also feared that the ERA would undercut the male-dominated labor unions that were a core component of the New Deal coalition. Most Northern Democrats, who aligned themselves with the anti-ERA labor unions, opposed the amendment.

The ERA was also opposed by the American Federation of Labor and other labor unions, which feared the amendment would invalidate protective labor legislation for women. The League of Women Voters, formerly the National American Woman Suffrage Association, opposed the Equal Rights Amendment until 1972, fearing the loss of protective labor legislation.

At the 1944 Democratic National Convention, the Democrats made the divisive step of including the ERA in their platform, but this was a hotly contested change not reflected in later party platforms. At the Democratic National Convention in 1960, a proposal to endorse the ERA was rejected after it was opposed by groups including the American Civil Liberties Union (ACLU), the AFL-CIO, labor unions such as the American Federation of Teachers, Americans for Democratic Action (ADA), the American Nurses Association, the Women's Division of the Methodist Church, and the National Councils of Jewish, Catholic, and Negro Women.

Between 1948 and 1970, chairman Emanuel Celler of the House Judiciary Committee refused to consider the ERA in the House of Representatives.

==== Support from the Democratic Party under Kennedy ====
Presidential candidate John F. Kennedy announced his support of the ERA in an October 21, 1960, letter to the chairman of the National Woman's Party. Ultimately however, as president, Kennedy's ties to labor unions meant that he and his administration did not support the ERA.

Kennedy did appoint a blue-ribbon commission on women, the President's Commission on the Status of Women, to investigate the problem of sex discrimination in the United States. The commission was chaired by Eleanor Roosevelt, who opposed the ERA but no longer spoke against it publicly. In the early 1960s, Eleanor Roosevelt announced that, due to unionization, she believed the ERA was no longer a threat to women as it once may have been and told supporters that, as far as she was concerned, they could have the amendment if they wanted it. However, she never went so far as to endorse the ERA. The commission that she chaired reported (after her death) that no ERA was needed, believing that the Supreme Court could give sex the same "suspect" test as race and national origin, through interpretation of the Fifth and Fourteenth Amendments of the Constitution. The Supreme Court did not provide the "suspect" class test for sex, however, resulting in a continuing lack of equal rights. The commission did, though, help win passage of the Equal Pay Act of 1963, which banned sex discrimination in wages in a number of professions (it would later be amended in the early 1970s to include the professions that it initially excluded) and secured an executive order from Kennedy eliminating sex discrimination in the civil service. The commission, composed largely of anti-ERA feminists with ties to labor, proposed remedies to the widespread sex discrimination it unearthed.

The national commission spurred the establishment of state and local commissions on the status of women and arranged for follow-up conferences in the years to come. The following year, the Civil Rights Act of 1964 banned workplace discrimination not only on the basis of race, religion, and national origin, but also on the basis of sex, thanks to the lobbying of Alice Paul and Coretta Scott King and the political influence of Representative Martha Griffiths of Michigan.

==== Impact of second-wave feminism ====
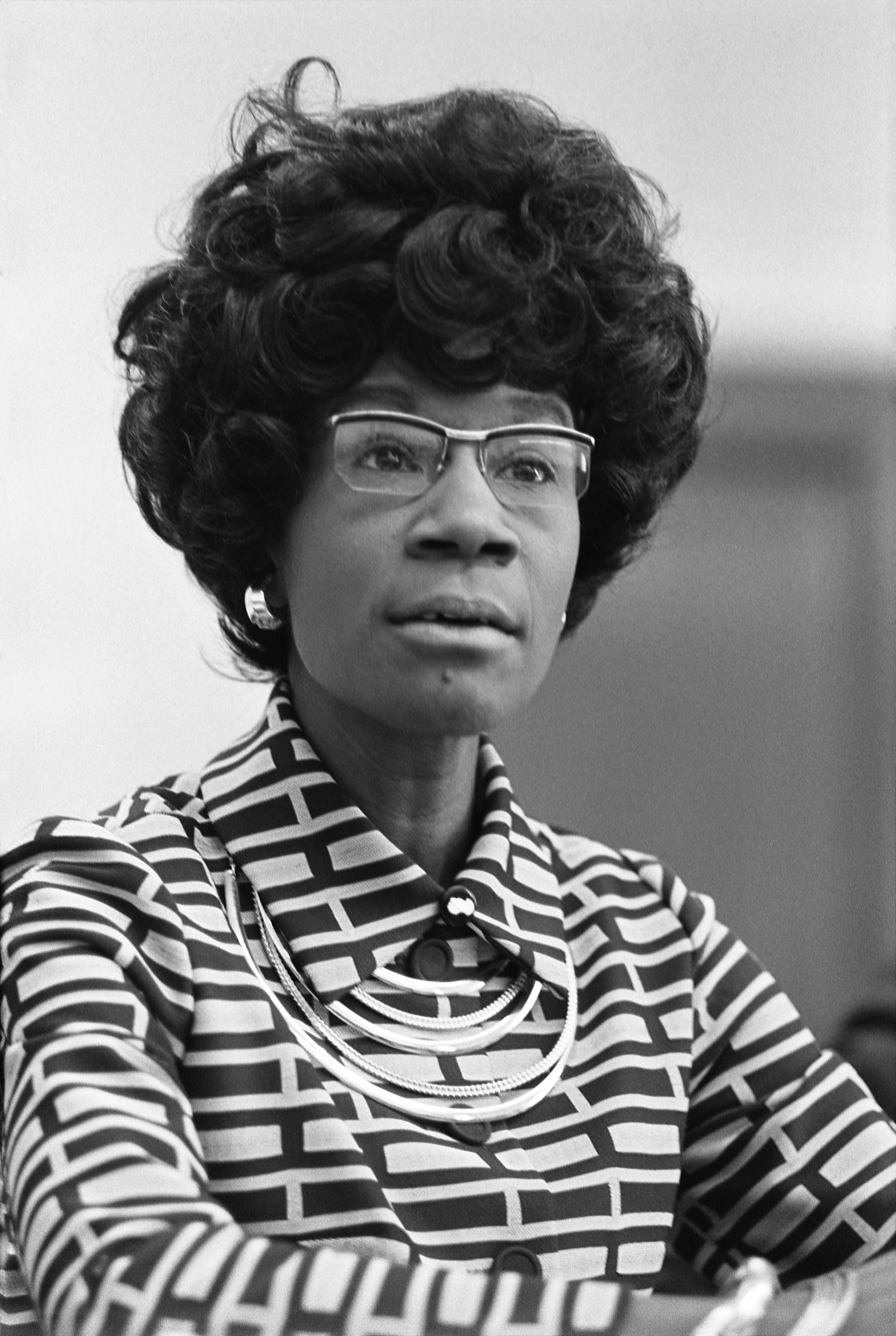
Shirley Chisholm, photographed in 1972

A new women's movement gained ground in the later 1960s as a result of a variety of factors: Betty Friedan's bestseller The Feminine Mystique; the network of women's rights commissions formed by Kennedy's national commission; the frustration over women's social and economic status; and anger over the lack of government and Equal Employment Opportunity Commission enforcement of the Equal Pay Act and Title VII of the Civil Rights Act. In June 1966, at the Third National Conference on the Status of Women in Washington, D.C., Betty Friedan and a group of activists frustrated with the lack of government action in enforcing Title VII of the Civil Rights Act formed the National Organization for Women (NOW) to act as an "NAACP for women", demanding full equality for American women and men. In 1967, at the urging of Alice Paul, NOW endorsed the Equal Rights Amendment. The decision caused some union Democrats and social conservatives to leave the organization and form the Women's Equity Action League (within a few years WEAL also endorsed the ERA), but the move to support the amendment benefited NOW, bolstering its membership. By the late 1960s, NOW had made significant political and legislative victories and was gaining enough power to become a major lobbying force. In 1969, newly elected representative Shirley Chisholm of New York gave her famous speech "Equal Rights for Women" on the floor of the U.S. House of Representatives.

== Views ==
=== In support ===
Supporters of the ERA point to the lack of a specific guarantee in the Constitution for equal rights protections on the basis of sex. In 1973, future Supreme Court justice Ruth Bader Ginsburg summarized a supporting argument for the ERA in the American Bar Association Journal:

The equal rights amendment, in sum, would dedicate the nation to a new view of the rights and responsibilities of men and women. It firmly rejects sharp legislative lines between the sexes as constitutionally tolerable. Instead, it looks toward a legal system in which each person will be judged on the basis of individual merit and not on the basis of an unalterable trait of birth that bears no necessary relationship to need or ability.

Later, Ginsburg voiced her opinion that the best course of action on the Equal Rights Amendment is to start over, due to being past its expiration date. While at a discussion at Georgetown University in February 2020, Ginsburg noted the challenge that "if you count a latecomer on the plus side, how can you disregard states that said 'we've changed our minds?'"

In the early 1940s, both the Democratic and Republican parties added support for the ERA to their platforms.

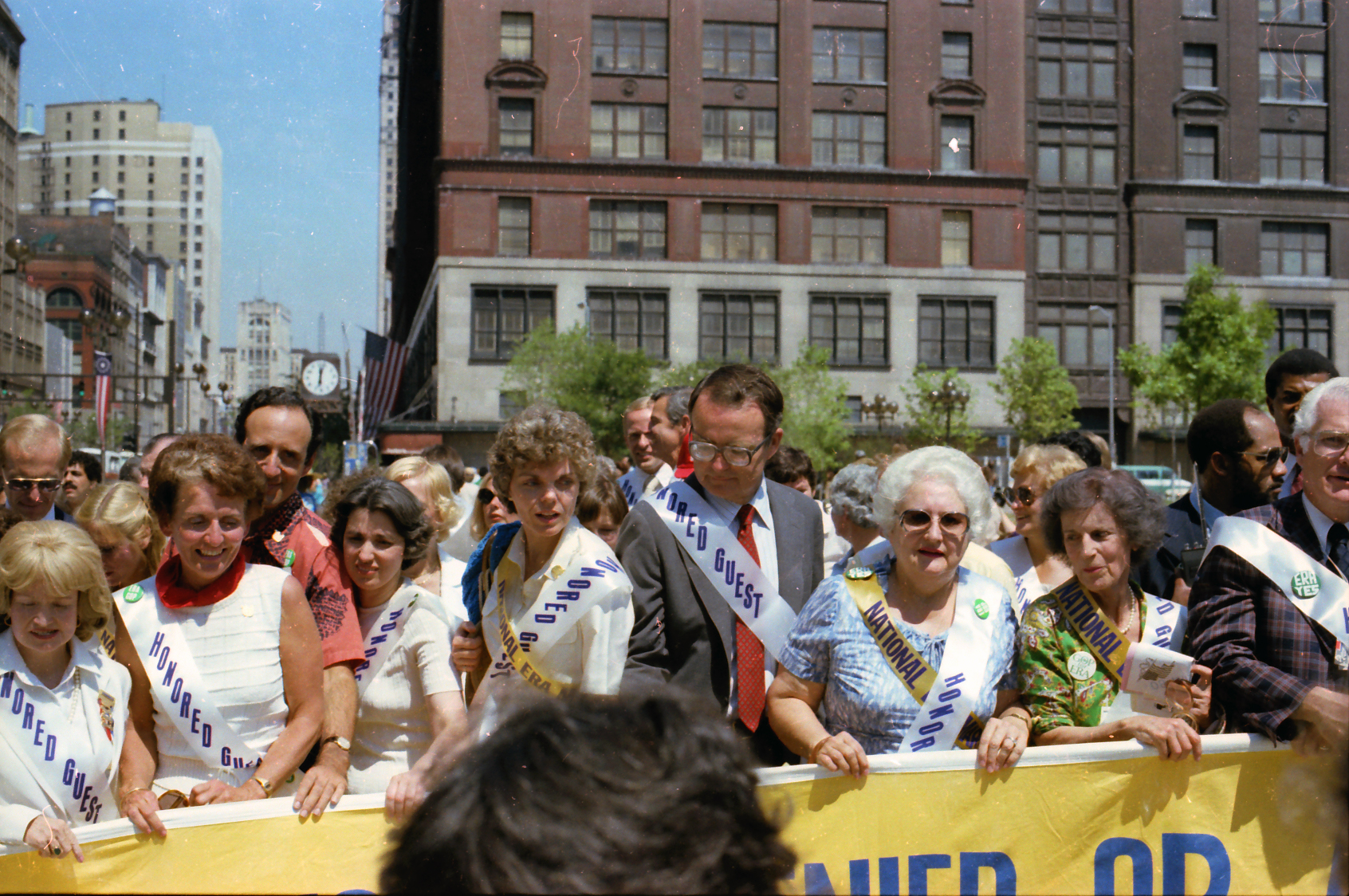
Pro-ERA march at the 1980 Republican National Convention, the first presidential election year that the party dropped its support for the ERA in four decades

The National Organization for Women (NOW) and ERAmerica, a coalition of almost 80 organizations, led the pro-ERA efforts. Between 1972 and 1982, ERA supporters held rallies, petitioned, picketed, went on hunger strikes, and performed acts of civil disobedience. On July 9, 1978, NOW and other organizations hosted a national march in Washington, D.C., which garnered over 100,000 supporters, and was followed by a Lobby Day on July 10. On June 6, 1982, NOW sponsored marches in states that had not passed the ERA including Florida, Illinois, North Carolina, and Oklahoma. Key feminists of the time, such as Gloria Steinem, spoke out in favor of the ERA, arguing that ERA opposition was based on gender myths that overemphasized difference and ignored evidence of unequal treatment between men and women. A more militant feminist group, Grassroots Group of Second Class Citizens, organized a series of non-violent direct action tactics in support of the ERA in Illinois in 1982.

It has been noted that many African-American women have supported the ERA. One prominent female supporter was New York representative Shirley Chisholm. On August 10, 1970, she gave a speech on the ERA called "For the Equal Rights Amendment" in Washington, D.C. In her address, she claimed that sex discrimination had become widespread and that the ERA would remedy it. She also claimed that laws to protect women in the workforce from unsafe working conditions would be needed by men, too, and thus the ERA would help all people. By 1976, 60% of African-American women and 63% of African-American men were in favor of the ERA, and the legislation was supported by organizations such as the NAACP, National Council of Negro Women, Coalition of Black Trade Unionists, National Association of Negro Business, and the National Black Feminist Organization.

The ERA has been supported by several Republican women including Florence Dwyer, Jill Ruckelshaus, Mary Dent Crisp, Justice Sandra Day O'Connor, First Lady Betty Ford and Senator Margaret Chase Smith. Support from Republican men has included President Dwight D. Eisenhower, President Richard Nixon, Senator Richard Lugar and Senator Strom Thurmond.

=== In opposition ===
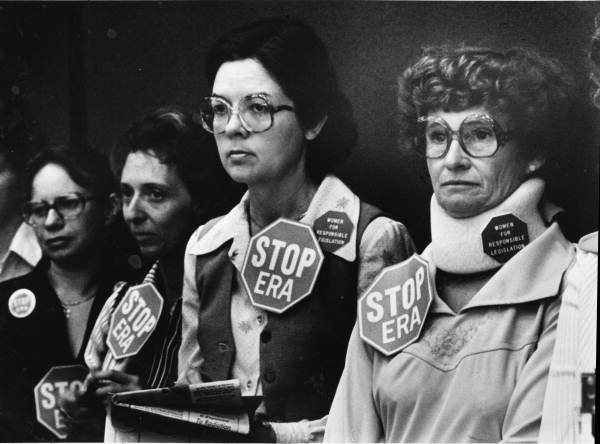
Anti-ERA women watching a committee meeting of the Florida Senate in 1979, where consideration of the ERA was postponed, thus effectively killing the resolution for the 1979 session

Many opponents of the ERA focus on the importance of traditional gender roles. They argued that the amendment would guarantee the possibility that women would be subject to conscription and be required to have military combat roles in future wars if it were passed. Defense of traditional gender roles proved to be a useful tactic. In Illinois, supporters of Phyllis Schlafly, a conservative Republican activist from Missouri, used traditional symbols of the American housewife. They took homemade bread, jams, and apple pies to the state legislators, with the slogans, "Preserve us from a Congressional jam; Vote against the ERA sham" and "I am for Mom and apple pie." They appealed to married women by stressing that the amendment would invalidate protective laws such as alimony and eliminate the tendency for mothers to obtain custody over their children in divorce cases. It was suggested that single-sex bathrooms would be eliminated and same-sex couples would be able to get married if the amendment were passed. Women who supported traditional gender roles started to oppose the ERA. Schlafly said passage of the amendment would threaten Social Security benefits for housewives. Opponents also argued that men and women were already equal enough with the passage of the Equal Pay Act of 1963 and the Civil Rights Act of 1964, and that women's colleges would have to admit men. Schlafly's argument that protective laws would be lost resonated with working-class women.

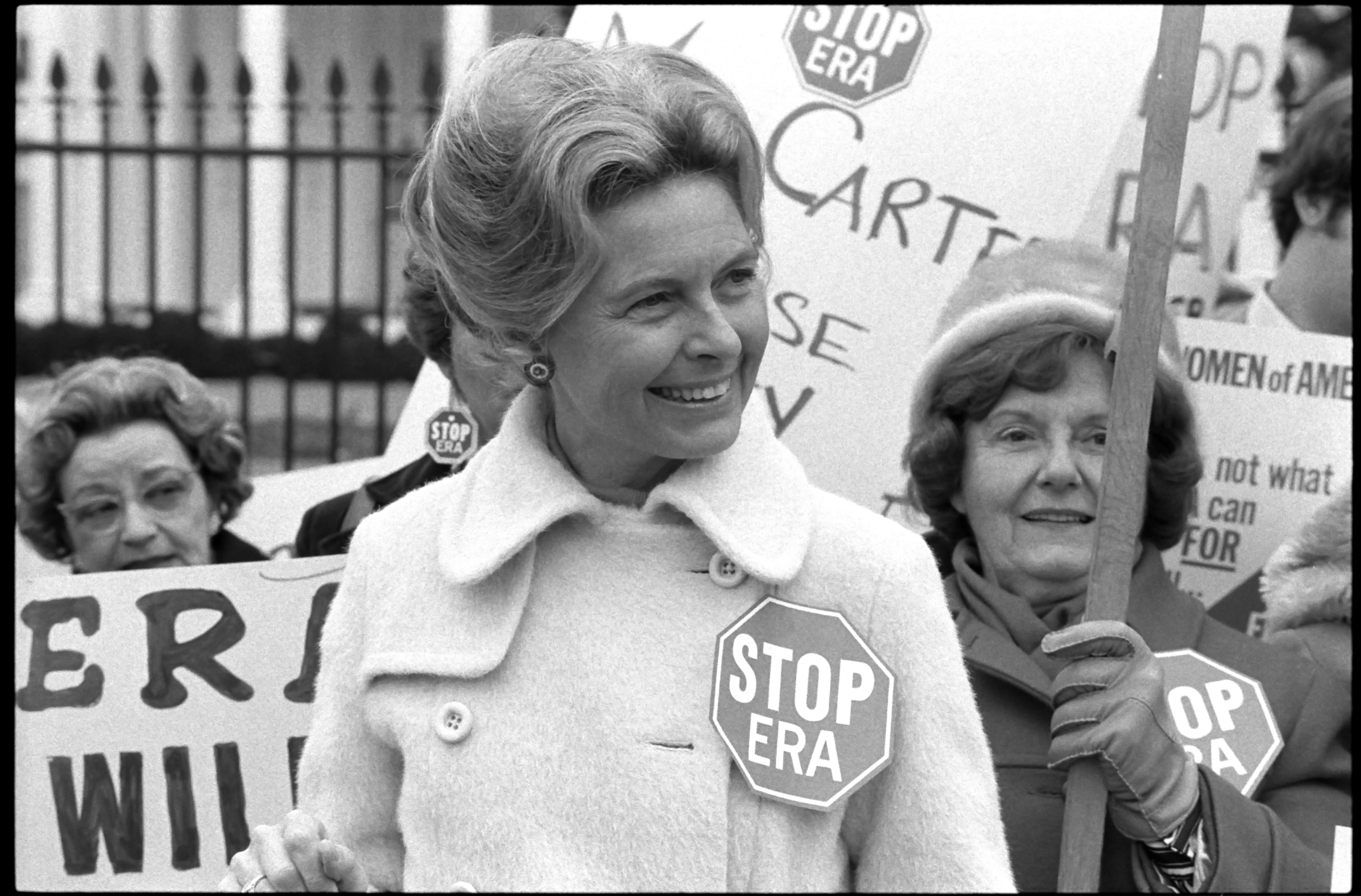
Phyllis Schlafly, a conservative activist, organized opposition to the ERA and argued that it "would lead to women being drafted by the military and to public unisex bathrooms".

At the 1980 Republican National Convention, the Republican Party platform was amended to end its support for the ERA. The most prominent opponent of the ERA was Schlafly. Leading the Stop ERA campaign, Schlafly defended traditional gender roles and would often attempt to incite feminists by opening her speeches with lines such as, "I'd like to thank my husband for letting me be here tonight—I always like to say that, because it makes the libs so mad." When Schlafly began her campaign in 1972, public polls showed support for the amendment was widely popular and thirty states had ratified the amendment by 1973. After 1973, the number of ratifying states slowed to a trickle. Support in the states that had not ratified fell below 50%. Public opinion in key states shifted against the ERA as its opponents, operating on the local and state levels, won over the public. The state legislators in battleground states followed public opinion in rejecting the ERA.

Phyllis Schlafly was a key player in the defeat. Political scientist Jane Mansbridge in her history of the ERA argues that the draft issue was the single most powerful argument used by Schlafly and the other opponents to defeat ERA. Mansbridge concluded, "Many people who followed the struggle over the ERA believed—rightly in my view—that the Amendment would have been ratified by 1975 or 1976 had it not been for Phyllis Schlafly's early and effective effort to organize potential opponents." Legal scholar Joan C. Williams maintained, "ERA was defeated when Schlafly turned it into a war among women over gender roles." Historian Judith Glazer-Raymo asserted:

As moderates, we thought we represented the forces of reason and goodwill but failed to take seriously the power of the family values argument and the single-mindedness of Schlafly and her followers. The ERA's defeat seriously damaged the women's movement, destroying its momentum and its potential to foment social change... Eventually, this resulted in feminist dissatisfaction with the Republican Party, giving the Democrats a new source of strength that when combined with overwhelming minority support, helped elect Bill Clinton to the presidency in 1992 and again in 1996.

The John Birch Society and its members organized opposition to the ERA in multiple states. According to Professor Edward H. Miller, the group played a key role in addition to Schlafly in preventing the amendment's ratification.

Many ERA supporters blamed their defeat on special interest forces, especially the insurance industry and conservative organizations, suggesting that they had funded an opposition that subverted the democratic process and the will of the pro-ERA majority. Such supporters argued that while the public face of the anti-ERA movement was Phyllis Schlafly and her STOP ERA organization, there were other important groups in the opposition as well, such as the powerful National Council of Catholic Women, labor feminists and (until 1973) the AFL–CIO. Steinem blamed the insurance industry and said Schlafly "did not change one vote." Opposition to the amendment was particularly high among religious conservatives, who argued that the amendment would guarantee universal abortion rights and the right for homosexual couples to marry. Critchlow and Stachecki say the anti-ERA movement was based on strong backing among Southern whites, Evangelical Christians, members of the Church of Jesus Christ of Latter-day Saints, Orthodox Jews, and Roman Catholics, including both men and women.

The ERA has long been opposed by anti-abortion groups who believe it would be interpreted to allow legal abortion without limits and taxpayer funding for abortion.

=== Public opinion ===
Public viewpoints on the amendment varied considerably by region, with a poll from April 1975 finding 62 percent support in the East, and only 41 percent in the South. The poll, conducted by Harris, also found that men favored the amendment 8% more than women did.

Category	Favor	Oppose	Not sure
Nationwide	51%	36%	13%
East	62%	26%	12%
Midwest	49%	39%	12%
South	41%	44%	15%
West	55%	34%	11%
Men	56%	31%	13%
Women	48%	40%	12%
18-29	66%	25%	9%
30-49	50%	37%	13%
50 and over	41%	43%	16%
Black people	65%	22%	13%
White people	50%	38%	12%

== Congressional passage (1970–1972) ==
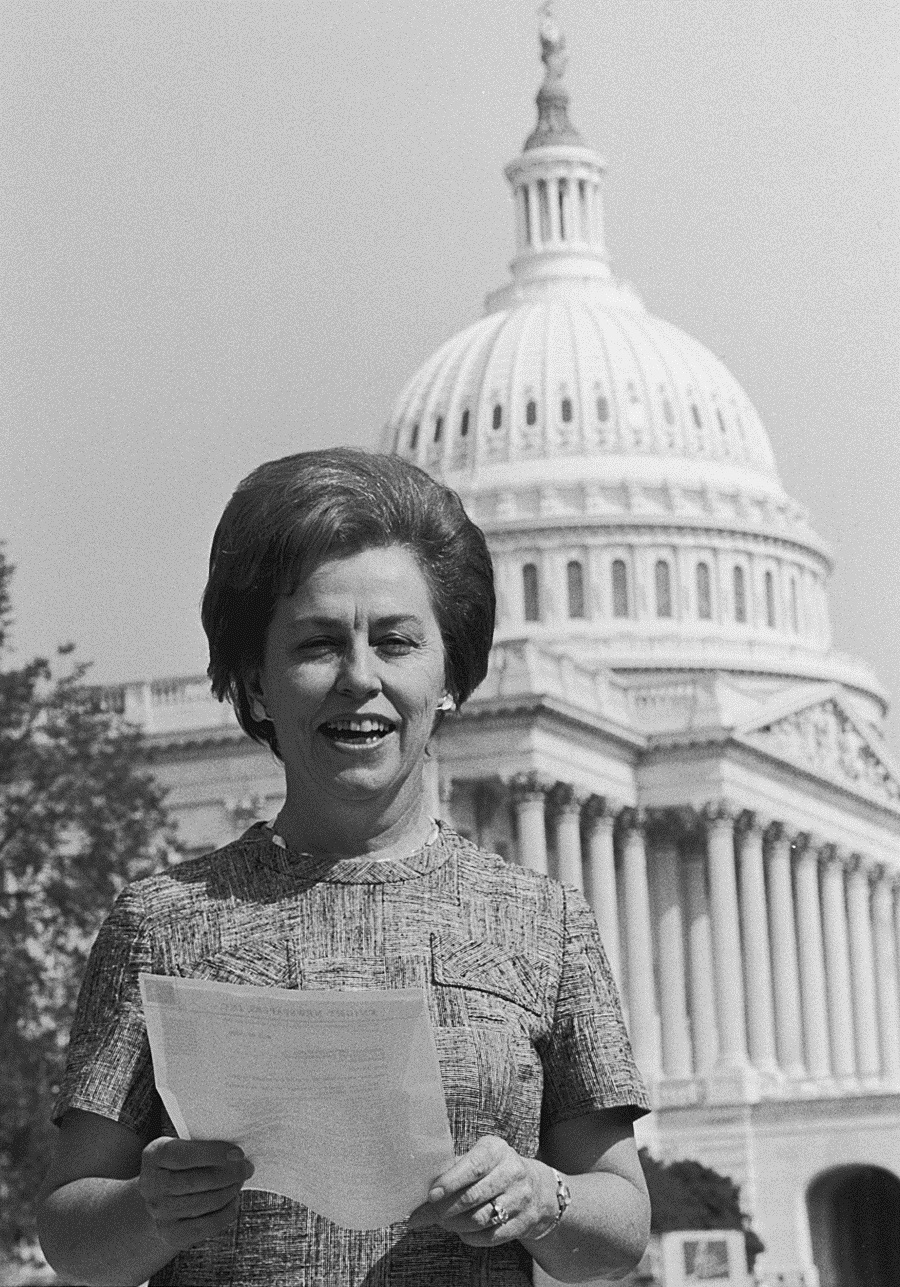
U.S. representative Martha W. Griffiths championed the ERA.

In February 1970, NOW picketed the United States Senate, a subcommittee of which was holding hearings on a constitutional amendment to lower the voting age to 18. NOW disrupted the hearings and demanded a hearing on the Equal Rights Amendment and won a meeting with senators to discuss the ERA. That August, over 20,000 American women held a nationwide Women's Strike for Equality protest to demand full social, economic, and political equality. Said Betty Friedan of the strike, "All kinds of women's groups all over the country will be using this week on August 26 particularly, to point out those areas in women's life which are still not addressed. For example, a question of equality before the law; we are interested in the Equal Rights Amendment." Despite being centered in New York City—which was regarded as one of the biggest strongholds for NOW and other groups sympathetic to the women's liberation movement such as Redstockings—and having a small number of participants in contrast to the large-scale anti-war and civil rights protests that had occurred in the recent time prior to the event, the strike was credited as one of the biggest turning points in the rise of second-wave feminism.

In Washington, D.C., protesters presented a sympathetic Senate leadership with a petition for the Equal Rights Amendment at the U.S. Capitol. Influential news sources such as Time also supported the cause of the protestors. Soon after the strike took place, activists distributed literature across the country as well. In 1970, congressional hearings began on the ERA.

On August 10, 1970, Michigan Democrat Martha Griffiths successfully brought the Equal Rights Amendment to the House floor, after 15 years of the joint resolution having languished in the House Judiciary Committee. The joint resolution passed in the House and continued on to the Senate, which voted for the ERA with an added clause that women would be exempt from the military. The 91st Congress, however, ended before the joint resolution could progress any further.

Griffiths reintroduced the ERA, and achieved success on Capitol Hill with her H.J.Res. 208, which was adopted by the House on October 12, 1971, with a vote of 354 yeas (For), 24 nays (Against) and 51 not voting. Griffiths's joint resolution was then adopted by the Senate—without change—on March 22, 1972, by a vote of 84 yeas, 8 nays and 7 not voting. The Senate version, drafted by Senator Birch Bayh of Indiana, passed after the defeat of an amendment proposed by Senator Sam Ervin of North Carolina that would have exempted women from the draft. President Richard Nixon immediately endorsed the ERA's approval upon its passage by the 92nd Congress.

== Ratification in the state legislatures ==
Ratified Ratified after June 30, 1982 Ratified, then revoked Ratified, then revoked after June 30, 1982 Not ratified, approved in only 1 house of legislature Not ratified

=== Ratifications ===
On March 22, 1972, the ERA was placed before the state legislatures, with a seven-year deadline to acquire ratification by three-fourths (38) of the state legislatures. A majority of states ratified the proposed constitutional amendment within a year. Hawaii became the first state to ratify the ERA, which it did on the same day the amendment was approved by Congress: The U.S. Senate's vote on H.J.Res. 208 took place in the mid-to-late afternoon in Washington, D.C., when it was still midday in Hawaii. The Hawaii Senate and House of Representatives voted their approval shortly after noon Hawaii Standard Time.

During 1972, a total of 22 state legislatures ratified the amendment and eight more joined in early 1973. Between 1974 and 1977, only five states approved the ERA, and advocates became worried about the approaching March 22, 1979, deadline.

The ERA was ratified by the following states prior to the initial March 22, 1979, deadline:

1. Hawaii: March 22, 1972
2. New Hampshire: March 23, 1972
3. Delaware: March 23, 1972
4. Iowa: March 24, 1972
5. Idaho: March 24, 1972 (rescinded ratification February 8, 1977)
6. Kansas: March 28, 1972
7. Nebraska: March 29, 1972 (rescinded ratification March 15, 1973)
8. Texas: March 30, 1972
9. Tennessee: April 4, 1972 (rescinded ratification April 23, 1974)
10. Alaska: April 5, 1972
11. Rhode Island: April 14, 1972
12. New Jersey: April 17, 1972
13. Colorado: April 21, 1972
14. West Virginia: April 22, 1972
15. Wisconsin: April 26, 1972
16. New York: May 18, 1972
17. Michigan: May 22, 1972
18. Maryland: May 26, 1972
19. Massachusetts: June 21, 1972
20. Kentucky: June 27, 1972 (rescinded ratification March 17, 1978) (Note: The lieutenant governor of Kentucky, Thelma Stovall, who was acting as governor in the governor's absence, vetoed the rescinding resolution. Given that Article V explicitly provides that amendments are valid "when ratified by the legislatures of three fourths of the several states" this raised questions as to whether a state's governor, or someone temporarily acting as governor, has the power to veto any measure related to amending the United States Constitution.)
21. Pennsylvania: September 27, 1972
22. California: November 13, 1972
23. Wyoming: January 26, 1973
24. South Dakota: February 5, 1973 (rescinded ratification March 5, 1979)
25. Oregon: February 8, 1973
26. Minnesota: February 8, 1973
27. New Mexico: February 28, 1973
28. Vermont: March 1, 1973
29. Connecticut: March 15, 1973
30. Washington: March 22, 1973
31. Maine: January 18, 1974
32. Montana: January 25, 1974
33. Ohio: February 7, 1974
34. North Dakota: February 3, 1975 (rescinded ratification March 19, 2021)
35. Indiana: January 18, 1977

The ERA has been ratified by the following states since the March 22, 1979, deadline:

36. Nevada: March 22, 2017
37. Illinois: May 30, 2018
38. Virginia: January 27, 2020

Ratification resolutions have also been defeated in Arizona, Arkansas, Louisiana and Mississippi.

==== Rescinding ratification ====
Six state legislatures (noted above) have rescinded their earlier ratification of the ERA. Article V of the Constitution is silent as to whether a state may rescind, or otherwise revoke, a previous ratification of a proposed constitutional amendment while it is pending before the states. The rescinding of a ratification of a constitutional amendment has occurred previously. In the 1860s, a few states voted to rescind their ratifications for the Fourteenth and Fifteenth Amendments. On both occasions however, these actions were rejected and the original ratification was counted when the federal government tallied the total states that had ratified the amendment.

In February 2024, the American Bar Association (ABA) passed resolution 601, supporting implementation of the ERA. The ABA urges implementation stating that a deadline for ratification of an amendment to the U.S. Constitution is not consistent with Article V of the Constitution and that under Article V, states are not permitted to rescind prior ratifications.

The ERA Project at Columbia Law School's Center for Gender and Sexuality Law have written that "[t]he Constitution says nothing about whether a state can rescind or revoke its ratification of a Constitutional Amendment, either before the ratification process has been completed or after." Advocates and scholars dispute whether ratification is a one-time event, once done it cannot be undone as the Constitution only provides for ratification, not unratification.

=== Sunsetting ratifications ===
==== South Dakota (pre-1979 deadline) ====
Among those rejecting Congress's claim to even hold authority to extend a previously established ratification deadline, the South Dakota Legislature adopted Senate Joint Resolution No. 2 on March 1, 1979. The joint resolution stipulated that South Dakota's 1973 ERA ratification would be "sunsetted" as of the original deadline, March 22, 1979. South Dakota's 1979 sunset joint resolution declared: "the Ninety-fifth Congress ex post facto has sought unilaterally to alter the terms and conditions in such a way as to materially affect the congressionally established time period for ratification" (designated as "POM-93" by the U.S. Senate and published verbatim in the Congressional Record of March 13, 1979, at pages 4861 and 4862).

The action on the part of South Dakota lawmakers—occurring 21 days prior to originally agreed-upon deadline of March 22, 1979—could be viewed as slightly different from a rescission. Constitution Annotated notes that "[f]our states had rescinded their ratifications [of the ERA] and a fifth had declared that its ratification would be void unless the amendment was ratified within the original time limit", with a footnote identifying South Dakota as that "fifth" state.

==== North Dakota (post-1979 deadline) ====
On March 19, 2021, North Dakota state lawmakers adopted Senate Concurrent Resolution No. 4010 to retroactively clarify that North Dakota's 1975 ratification of the ERA was valid only through "11:59 p.m. on March 22, 1979" and went on to proclaim that North Dakota "should not be counted by Congress, the Archivist of the United States, lawmakers in any other state, any court of law, or any other person, as still having on record a live ratification of the proposed Equal Rights Amendment to the Constitution of the United States as was offered by House Joint Resolution No. 208 of the 92nd Congress on March 22, 1972". The resolution was formally received by the U.S. Senate on April 20, 2021, was designated as "POM-10", was referred to the Senate's Judiciary Committee, and its full and complete verbatim text was published at page S2066 of the Congressional Record.

== Ratification deadline and extension ==
=== Congressional action ===
The original joint resolution (H.J.Res. 208), by which the 92nd Congress proposed the amendment to the states, was prefaced by the following resolving clause:

Resolved by the Senate and House of Representatives of the United States of America in Congress assembled (two-thirds of each House concurring therein), That the following article is proposed as an amendment to the Constitution of the United States, which shall be valid to all intents and purposes as part of the Constitution when ratified by the legislatures of three-fourths of the several States within seven years from the date of its submission by the Congress: [emphasis added]

As the joint resolution was passed on March 22, 1972, this effectively set March 22, 1979, as the deadline for the amendment to be ratified by the requisite number of states. However, the 92nd Congress did not incorporate any time limit into the body of the actual text of the proposed amendment, as had been done with a number of other proposed amendments.

In 1978, as the original 1979 deadline approached, the 95th Congress adopted H.J.Res. 638, by Representative Elizabeth Holtzman of New York (House: August; Senate: October 6; signing of the President: October 20), which purported to extend the ERA's ratification deadline to June 30, 1982. H.J.Res. 638 received less than two-thirds of the vote (a simple majority, not a supermajority) in both the House of Representatives and the Senate; for that reason, ERA supporters deemed it necessary that H.J.Res. 638 be transmitted to then-President Jimmy Carter for signature as a safety precaution. The U.S. Supreme Court ruled in Hollingsworth v. Virginia (1798) that the President of the United States has no formal role in the passing of constitutional amendments. Carter signed the joint resolution, although he noted, on strictly procedural grounds, the irregularity of his doing so given the Supreme Court's decision in 1798. During this disputed extension of slightly more than three years, no additional states ratified or rescinded.

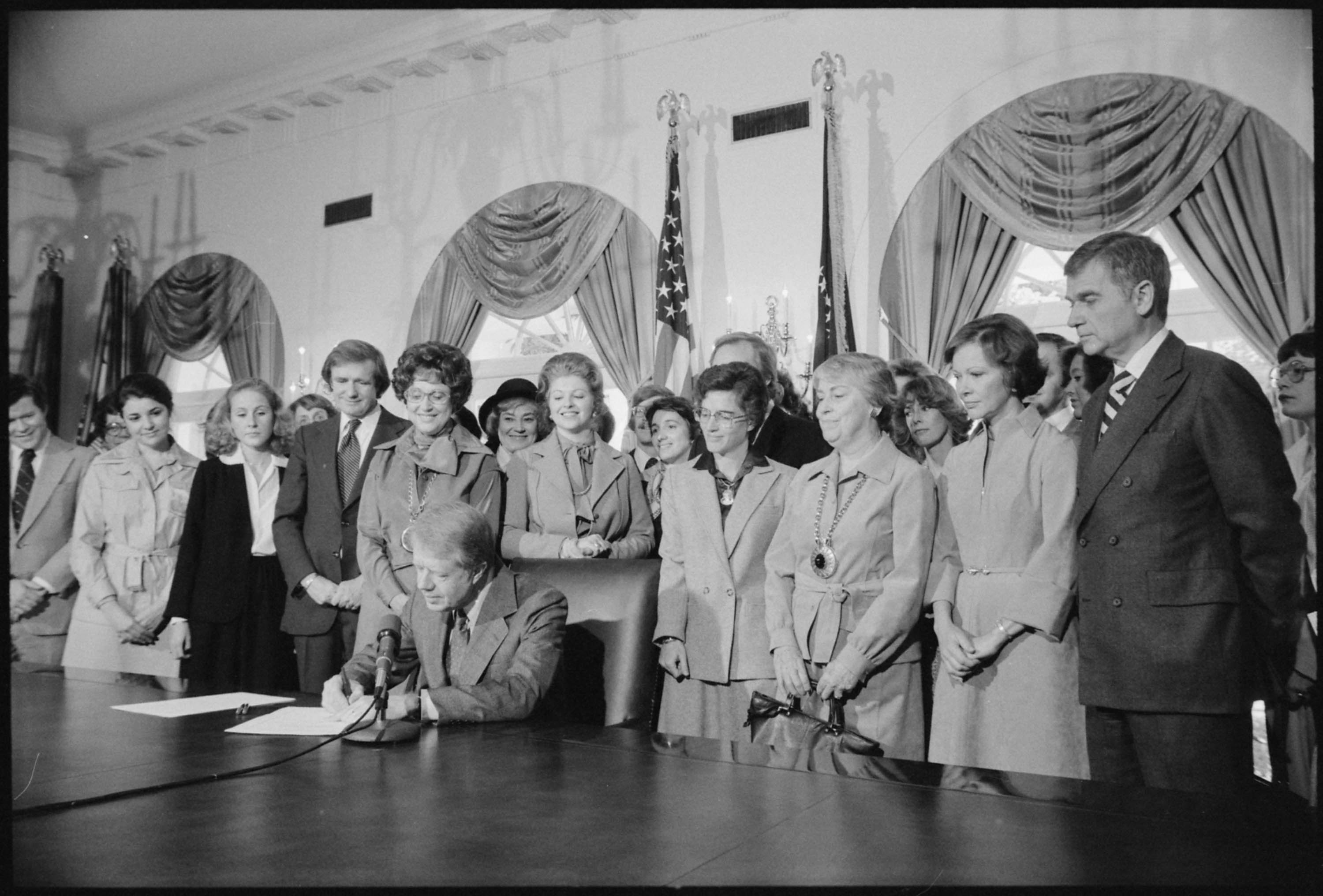
President Carter signing H.J.Res. 638 on October 20, 1978

The purported extension of ERA's ratification deadline was vigorously contested in 1978 as scholars were divided as to whether Congress actually has authority to revise a previously agreed-to deadline for the states to act upon a constitutional amendment. On June 18, 1980, a resolution in the Illinois House of Representatives resulted in a vote of 102–71 in favor, but Illinois's internal parliamentary rules required a three-fifths majority on constitutional amendments and so the measure failed by five votes. In 1982, seven female ERA supporters, known as the Grassroots Group of Second Class Citizens, went on a fast known as Women Hunger for Justice and seventeen chained themselves to the entrance of the Illinois Senate chamber. Sonia Johnson, Zoe Nicholson and Sister Maureen Feidler all participated in the fast. The closest that the ERA came to gaining an additional ratification between the original deadline of March 22, 1979, and the revised June 30, 1982, expiration date was when it was approved by the Florida House of Representatives on June 21, 1982. In the final week before the revised deadline, that ratifying resolution, however, was defeated in the Florida Senate by a vote of 16 to 22. Even if Florida had ratified the ERA, the proposed amendment would still have fallen short of the required 38. Many ERA supporters mourned the failure of the amendment. For example, a jazz funeral for the ERA was held in New Orleans in July 1982.

According to research by Jules B. Gerard, professor of law at Washington University in St. Louis, of the 35 legislatures that passed ratification resolutions, 24 of them explicitly referred to the original 1979 deadline.

=== Lawsuit regarding deadline extension ===
On December 23, 1981, a federal district court, in the case of Idaho v. Freeman, ruled that the extension of the ERA ratification deadline to June 30, 1982, was not valid, and that the ERA had actually expired from state legislative consideration more than two years earlier on the original expiration date of March 22, 1979. On January 25, 1982, however, the U.S. Supreme Court stayed the lower court's decision.

After the disputed June 30, 1982, extended deadline had come and gone, the Supreme Court, at the beginning of its new term, on October 4, 1982, in the separate case of NOW v. Idaho, 459 U.S. 809 (1982), vacated the federal district court decision in Idaho v. Freeman, which, in addition to declaring March 22, 1979, as ERA's expiration date, had upheld the validity of state rescissions. The Supreme Court declared these controversies moot based on the memorandum of the appellant Gerald P. Carmen, the then-Administrator of General Services, that the ERA had not received the required number of ratifications (38) and so "the Amendment has failed of adoption no matter what the resolution of the legal issues presented here".

In the 1939 case of Coleman v. Miller, the Supreme Court ruled that if there was not a deadline by which the proposed amendment had to be acted upon by the requisite three-fourths of state legislatures or state ratifying conventions, then the proposed amendment remains. The court also ruled that it is in the discretion of Congress to arbitrate whether at least three-fourths of the states have ratified that amendment.

== Lawsuits regarding ratification ==
=== Alabama lawsuit opposing ratification ===
On December 16, 2019, the states of Alabama, Louisiana and South Dakota sued to prevent further ratifying of the Equal Rights Amendment. Alabama Attorney General Steve Marshall stated, "The people had seven years to consider the ERA, and they rejected it. To sneak it into the Constitution through this illegal process would undermine the very basis for our constitutional order."

South Dakota Attorney General Jason Ravnsborg stated in a press release:

The South Dakota Legislature ratified the ERA in 1973, but in 1979 passed Senate Joint Resolution 2 which required the ERA be ratified in the original time limit set by Congress or be rescinded. Because thirty-eight states failed to ratify the amendment by March 31, 1979 the South Dakota Legislature rescinded its ratification of the ERA. It is the duty of the Attorney General to defend and support our Legislature. It would be a disservice to the citizens of South Dakota to ignore this obligation of my office. This is an issue of following the rule of law, the rules that our founding fathers put into place to protect us from government making decisions without the consent or support of "we the people". If Congress wants to pass an updated version of the ERA, taking into consideration all the changes in the law since 1972, I have no doubt the South Dakota Legislature would debate the merits in a new ratification process. An amendment to the Constitution should not be done by procedural nuances decades after the deadline prescribed by Congress, but through an open and transparent process where each State knows the ramifications of its actions.

On January 6, 2020, the Department of Justice Office of Legal Counsel official Steven Engel issued an opinion in response to the lawsuit by Alabama, Louisiana, and South Dakota, stating that "We conclude that Congress had the constitutional authority to impose a deadline on the ratification of the ERA and, because that deadline has expired, the ERA Resolution is no longer pending before the States." The OLC argued in part that Congress had the authority to impose a deadline for the ERA and that it did not have the authority to retroactively extend the deadline once it had expired.

On February 27, 2020, the States of Alabama, Louisiana and South Dakota entered into a joint stipulation and voluntary dismissal with the Archivist of the United States. The joint stipulation incorporated the Department of Justice's Office of Legal Counsel's opinion; stated that the Archivist would not certify the adoption of the Equal Rights Amendment and stated that if the Department of Justice ever concludes that the 1972 ERA Resolution is still pending and that the Archivist therefore has authority to certify the ERA's adoption ... the Archivist will make no certification concerning ratification of the ERA until at least 45 days following the announcement of the Department of Justice's conclusion, absent a court order compelling him to do so sooner." On March 2, 2020, Federal District Court Judge L. Scott Coogler entered an order regarding the Joint Stipulation and Plaintiff's Voluntary Dismissal, granting the dismissal without prejudice.

=== Massachusetts lawsuit supporting ratification ===
On January 7, 2020, a complaint was filed by Equal Means Equal, The Yellow Roses and Katherine Weitbrecht in the United States District Court for the District of Massachusetts against the Archivist of the United States, seeking to have him count the three most recently ratifying states and certify the ERA as having become part of the United States Constitution. On August 6, 2020, Judge Denise Casper granted the Archivist's motion to dismiss, ruling that the plaintiffs did not have standing to sue to compel the Archivist to certify and so she could not rule on the merits of the case. On August 21, 2020, the plaintiffs appealed this decision to the United States Court of Appeals for the First Circuit and on September 2, 2020, the plaintiffs asked the Supreme Court to hear this case. Subsequently, the Supreme Court denied the request to intervene before the First Circuit gives its decision. On June 29, 2021, the First Circuit affirmed the District Court's decision that "the plaintiffs have not met their burden at the pleading stage with respect to those federal constitutional requirements; we affirm the order dismissing their suit for lack of standing." An en banc rehearing request was denied on January 4, 2022.

=== 2020–2023 lawsuit in the District of Columbia supporting ratification ===
On January 30, 2020, the attorneys general of Virginia, Illinois and Nevada filed a lawsuit in the United States District Court for the District of Columbia to require the Archivist of the United States to "carry out his statutory duty of recognizing the complete and final adoption" of the ERA as the Twenty-eighth Amendment to the Constitution. On February 19, 2020, the States of Alabama, Louisiana, Nebraska, South Dakota and Tennessee moved to intervene in the case. On March 10, 2020, the Plaintiff States (Virginia, Illinois and Nevada) filed a memorandum in opposition to the five states seeking to intervene. On May 7, 2020, the DOJ filed a motion to dismiss, claiming the states do not have standing to bring the case to trial as they have to show any "concrete injury", nor that the case was ripe for review.

On June 12, 2020, the District Court granted the Intervening states (Alabama, Louisiana, Nebraska, South Dakota and Tennessee) motion to intervene in the case. On March 5, 2021, federal judge Rudolph Contreras of the United States District Court for the District of Columbia ruled that the ratification period for the ERA "expired long ago" and that three states' recent ratifications had come too late to be counted in the amendment's favor.

On May 3, 2021, the plaintiff states appealed the ruling to the United States Court of Appeals for the District of Columbia Circuit. Virginia withdrew from the lawsuit in February 2022. Oral arguments were held on September 28, 2022, before a panel composed by judges Wilkins, Rao and Childs. On February 28, 2023, the panel ruled that the plaintiffs failed to prove the ERA deadline invalid.

=== 2023–2025 California lawsuit supporting ratification ===
On June 23, 2023, Vikram Valame filed a complaint against the Selective Service System for harms caused by the Military Selective Service Act. The plaintiff argued that he was "subject to criminal prosecution, fines and imprisonment" under "unconstitutional registration and reporting requirements" and denied "valuable educational and job opportunities" due to failure to register. Valame argued that the ERA had been validly ratified as the 28th Amendment to the Constitution, contending that Congress's deadline for ratification was unconstitutional under Article V and that states had no ability to revoke their ratifications.

On January 20, 2024, Judge Nathanael M. Cousins granted the defendants' motion to dismiss and denied the plaintiff's motion for summary judgment. The court ruled that "no 28th Amendment appears in the Constitution" and that the plaintiff "cannot state a claim for relief under a constitutional amendment that does not exist." Valame filed a notice of appeal to the Ninth Circuit Court of Appeals. On July 17, 2025, the Ninth Circuit Court of Appeals affirmed the dismissal of Valame's complaint, saying, "We reject as meritless Valame's contention that the Equal Rights Amendment was ratified as the Twenty-Eighth Amendment to the Constitution."

== Post-deadline history ==
=== Post-deadline ratifications and the "three-state strategy" ===
Beginning in the mid-1990s, ERA supporters began an effort to win ratification of the ERA by the legislatures of states that did not ratify it between 1972 and 1982. These proponents state that Congress can remove the ERA's ratification deadline despite the deadline having expired, allowing the states again to ratify it. They also state that the ratifications ERA previously received remain in force and that rescissions of prior ratifications are not valid. Those who espouse the "three-state strategy" (now complete if the Nevada, Illinois and Virginia belated ERA approvals are deemed legitimate) were spurred, at least in part, by the unconventional 202-year-long ratification of the Constitution's Twenty-seventh Amendment (sometimes referred to as the "Madison Amendment") which became part of the Constitution in 1992 after pending before the state legislatures since 1789. However, the "Madison Amendment" was not associated with a ratification deadline, whereas the proposing clause of the ERA did include a deadline.

On June 21, 2009, the National Organization for Women decided to support both efforts to obtain additional state ratifications for the 1972 ERA and any strategy to submit a fresh-start ERA to the states for ratification.

In 2013, the Library of Congress's Congressional Research Service issued a report saying that ratification deadlines are a political question:

ERA proponents claim that the Supreme Court's decision in Coleman v. Miller gives Congress wide discretion in setting conditions for the ratification process.

The report goes on to say:

Revivification opponents caution ERA supporters against an overly broad interpretation of Coleman v. Miller, which, they argue, may have been be [sic] a politically influenced decision.

However, most recently, ERA Action has both led and brought renewed vigor to the movement by instituting what has become known as the "three-state strategy". In 2013, ERA Action began to gain traction with this strategy through their coordination with U.S. Senators and Representatives not only to introduce legislation in both houses of Congress to remove the ratification deadline, but also in gaining legislative sponsors. The Congressional Research Service then issued a report on the "three state strategy" on April 8, 2013, entitled "The Proposed Equal Rights Amendment: Contemporary Ratification Issues", stating that the approach was viable.

In 2014, under the auspices of ERA Action and their coalition partners, both the Virginia and Illinois state senates voted to ratify the ERA. That year, votes were blocked in both states' House chambers. In the meantime, the ERA ratification movement continued with the resolution being introduced in 10 state legislatures.

In the 2010s, due in part to fourth-wave feminism and the #MeToo movement, observers noted a renewed interest in adoption of the ERA.

On March 22, 2017, the Nevada Legislature became the first state in 40 years to ratify the ERA.

Illinois lawmakers and citizens took another look at the ERA, with hearings, testimony, and research including work by the law firm Winston & Strawn to address common legal questions about the ERA.

Illinois state lawmakers ratified the ERA on May 30, 2018, with a 72–45 vote in the Illinois House following a 43–12 vote in the Illinois Senate in April 2018.

Virginia became the 38th state to ratify the Equal Rights Amendment in January 2020. Prior, an effort to ratify the ERA in the Virginia General Assembly in 2018 failed to reach the floor of either the House of Delegates or Senate. In 2019, a Senate committee voted to advance the ERA to the floor. On January 15, the Senate voted 26–14 to approve the amendment and forward it to the House of Delegates, but it was defeated there in a 50–50 tied vote; at the time, the Republican Party held one-seat majorities in both houses. After the 2019 elections in Virginia gave the Democratic Party majority control of both houses of the Virginia legislature, the incoming leaders expressed their intent to hold another vote on ratification early in the 2020 legislative session. They did so, with ERA ratification resolutions HJ1 and SJ1 being passed in their respective chambers on January 15, 2020, and being passed by each other on January 27. Experts and advocates have acknowledged the legal uncertainty of the Virginian ratification, due to the expired deadlines and five revocations.

On December 15, 2024, a group of over 120 Democrats in the House of Representatives, led by Representatives Cori Bush (D-Missouri) and Ayanna Pressley (D-Massachusetts), sent a letter to outgoing President Joe Biden, arguing that both the deadlines and the revocations were illegitimate, meaning the ERA had been successfully ratified by 38 states, and urging Biden to direct the Archivist of the United States to certify the amendment as part of the Constitution immediately.

=== Reintroduction of the amendment in Congress ===
The amendment has been reintroduced in every session of Congress since 1982. Senator Ted Kennedy (D-Massachusetts) championed it in the Senate from the 99th Congress through the 110th Congress. Senator Robert Menendez (D-New Jersey) introduced the amendment at the end of the 111th Congress and supported it in the 112th Congress. In the House of Representatives, Carolyn Maloney (D-New York) has sponsored it since the 105th Congress, most recently in August 2013.

In 1983, the ERA passed through House committees with the same text as in 1972; however, it failed by six votes to achieve the necessary two-thirds vote on the House floor. That was the last time that the ERA received a floor vote in either house of Congress.

At the start of the 112th Congress on January 6, 2011, Senator Menendez, along with representatives Maloney, Jerrold Nadler (D-New York) and Gwen Moore (D-Wisconsin), held a press conference advocating for the Equal Rights Amendment's adoption. On March 5, 2013, the ERA was reintroduced by Senator Menendez as S.J. Res. 10.

The "New ERA" introduced in 2013, sponsored by Representative Carolyn B. Maloney, adds an additional sentence to the original text: "Women shall have equal rights in the United States and every place subject to its jurisdiction."

In 2023, the Congressional Caucus for the Equal Rights Amendment was founded by House Democrats.

=== Proposed removal of ratification deadline ===
On March 8, 2011, the 100th anniversary of International Women's Day, Representative Tammy Baldwin (D-Wisconsin) introduced legislation (H.J. Res. 47) to remove the congressionally imposed deadline for ratification of the Equal Rights Amendment. The resolution had 56 cosponsors. The resolution was referred to the Subcommittee on the Constitution by the House Committee on the Judiciary. The Subcommittee failed to vote on the resolution, and as such, the resolution died in subcommittee when the 112th Congress ended in January 2013. On March 22, 2012, the 40th anniversary of the ERA's congressional approval, Senator Benjamin L. Cardin (D-Maryland) introduced (S.J. Res. 39)—which is worded with slight differences from Representative Baldwin's (H.J. Res. 47). Senator Cardin was joined by seventeen other senators who cosponsored the Senate Joint Resolution. The resolution was referred to Senate Committee on the Judiciary, where a vote on it was never brought. The resolution, therefore, died in committee when the 112th Congress ended in January 2013.

On February 24, 2013, the New Mexico House of Representatives adopted House Memorial No. 7 asking that the congressionally imposed deadline for ERA ratification be removed. House Memorial No. 7 was officially received by the U.S. Senate on January 6, 2014, was designated as "POM-175" and was referred to the Senate's Committee on the Judiciary.

On January 30, 2019, Representative Jackie Speier (D-California) introduced legislation (H.J.Res. 38) in a renewed attempt to remove the deadline to ratify the amendment. As of April 30, 2019, the resolution had 188 co-sponsors, including Republicans Tom Reed of New York and Brian Fitzpatrick of Pennsylvania. It was referred to the Subcommittee on the Constitution, Civil Rights, and Civil Liberties by the House Committee on the Judiciary on the same day. The subcommittee heard testimony on the amendment and extension of the deadline on April 30, 2019.

On November 8, 2019, Representative Speier re-introduced the bill as H.J.Res. 79 to attempt to remove the deadline to ratify the amendment with 214 co-sponsors (later 224). The House passed H.J. Res. 79 on February 13, 2020, by a vote of 232–183, which was mostly along party lines though five Republicans joined in support. The bill expired without Senate action.

At the beginning of the 117th Congress, a joint resolution (H.J.Res. 17) to remove the deadline for ratification was again introduced in both chambers, with bipartisan support. The House passed the resolution by a 222–204 vote on March 17, 2021. The companion bill, S.J.Res. 1, introduced by Senator Ben Cardin, was co-sponsored by all 50 members of the Senate Democratic Caucus and Republicans Lisa Murkowski and Susan Collins. The measure failed as the Senate took no action on it.

=== Minnesota legislature resolution ===
On May 19, 2023, the Minnesota Legislature adopted a resolution memorializing Congress to declare the ERA fully ratified by the states, and now the 28th Amendment to the U.S. Constitution. Governor Tim Walz signed the legislation on May 26, and it was then sent to Congress and to President Joe Biden.

=== Biden declaration ===
On January 17, 2025, three days before leaving office, President Biden declared that the Equal Rights Amendment was the law of the land, stating: "It is long past time to recognize the will of the American people. In keeping with my oath and duty to Constitution and country, I affirm what I believe and what three-fourths of the states have ratified: the 28th Amendment is the law of the land, guaranteeing all Americans equal rights and protections under the law regardless of their sex." The declaration has no formal effect, however, and the National Archives has said they do not intend to certify the amendment as part of the Constitution, citing "established legal, judicial, and procedural decisions" supporting the integrity of the original ratification deadline in the absence of any subsequent extension or deadline removal by Congress or the court system. Biden's statement led to widespread criticism, with the Washington Post's analysis concluding "it's also remarkable that a president would try to declare something that isn't clearly the law to be not just the law, but part of the most significant legal document our country has. That at the very least skips over a whole lot of very valid legal issues that have never been settled."

== State equal rights amendments ==
Twenty-five states have adopted constitutions or constitutional amendments providing that equal rights under the law shall not be denied because of sex. Most of these provisions mirror the broad language of the ERA, while the wording in others resembles the Equal Protection Clause of the Fourteenth Amendment. The 1879 Constitution of California contains the earliest state equal rights provision on record. Narrowly written, it limits the equal rights conferred to "entering or pursuing a business, profession, vocation, or employment". Near the end of the 19th century two more states, Wyoming (1890) and Utah (1896), included equal rights provisions in their constitutions. These provisions were broadly written to ensure political and civil equality between women and men. Several states crafted and adopted their own equal rights amendments during the 1970s and 1980s, while the ERA was before the states, or afterward.

Some equal rights amendments and original constitutional equal rights provisions are:

- Alaska: No person is to be denied the enjoyment of any civil or political right because of race, color, creed, sex or national origin. The legislature shall implement this section. Alaska Constitution, Article I, § 3 (1972)
- California: A person may not be disqualified from entering or pursuing a business, profession, vocation, or employment because of sex, race, creed, color, or national or ethnic origin. California Constitution, Article I, § 8 (1879)
- Colorado: Equality of rights under the law shall not be denied or abridged by the state of Colorado or any of its political subdivisions because of sex. Colorado Constitution, Article II, § 29 (1973)
- Connecticut: No person shall be denied the equal protection of the law nor be subjected to segregation or discrimination in the exercise or enjoyment of his or her civil or political rights because of religion, race, color, ancestry, national origin, sex or physical or mental disability. Connecticut Constitution, Article I, § 20 (1984)
- Delaware: Equality of rights under the law shall not be denied or abridged on account of sex. Delaware Constitution, Article I, § 21 (2019)
- Florida: All natural persons, female and male alike, are equal before the law and have inalienable rights, among which are the right to enjoy and defend life and liberty, to pursue happiness, to be rewarded for industry, and to acquire, possess and protect property; except that the ownership, inheritance, disposition and possession of real property by aliens ineligible for citizenship may be regulated or prohibited by law. No person shall be deprived of any right because of race, religion, national origin, or physical disability. Florida Constitution, Article I, § 2 (1998)
- Hawaii: Equality of rights under the law shall not be denied or abridged by the State on account of sex. The legislature shall have the power to enforce, by appropriate legislation, the provisions of this section. Hawaii Constitution, Article I, § 3 (1972)
- Illinois: The equal protection of the laws shall not be denied or abridged on account of sex by the State or its units of local government and school districts. Illinois Constitution, Article I, § 18 (1970)
- Indiana: The General Assembly shall not grant to any citizen, or class of citizens, privileges or immunities, which, upon the same terms, shall not equally belong to all citizens. Indiana Constitution, Article I, § 23 (1851)
- Iowa: All men and women are, by nature, free and equal and have certain inalienable rights—among which are those of enjoying and defending life and liberty, acquiring, possessing and protecting property, and pursuing and obtaining safety and happiness. Iowa Constitution, Article I, § 1 (1998)
- Maryland: Equality of rights under the law shall not be abridged or denied because of sex. Maryland Constitution, Declaration of Rights, Article 46 (1972)
- Massachusetts: All people are born free and equal, and have certain natural, essential, and unalienable rights; among which may be reckoned the right of enjoying and defending their lives and liberties; that of acquiring, possessing and protecting property; in fine, that of seeking and obtaining their safety and happiness. Equality under the law shall not be denied or abridged because of sex, race, color, creed or national origin. Massachusetts Constitution, Part 1, Article 1 as amended by Article CVI by vote of the People, (1976)
- Montana: Individual dignity. The dignity of the human being is inviolable. No person shall be denied the equal protection of the laws. Neither the state nor any person, firm, corporation, or institution shall discriminate against any person in the exercise of his civil or political rights on account of race, color, sex, culture, social origin or condition, or political or religious ideas. Montana Constitution, Article II, § 4 (1973)
- New Hampshire: All men have certain natural, essential, and inherent rights among which are, the enjoying and defending life and liberty; acquiring, possessing, and protecting, property; and, in a word, of seeking and obtaining happiness. Equality of rights under the law shall not be denied or abridged by this state on account of race, creed, color, sex or national origin. New Hampshire Constitution, Part 1, Article 2 (1974)
- New Mexico: No person shall be deprived of life, liberty or property without due process of law. Equality of rights under the law shall not be denied on account of the sex of any person. New Mexico Constitution, Article II, § 18 (1973)
- New York: No person shall be denied the equal protection of the laws of this state or any subdivision thereof. No person shall, because of race, color, ethnicity, national origin, age, disability, creed [or], religion, or sex, including sexual orientation, gender identity, gender expression, pregnancy, pregnancy outcomes, and reproductive healthcare and autonomy, be subjected to any discrimination in [his or her] their civil rights by any other person or by any firm, corporation, or institution, or by the state or any agency or subdivision of the state, pursuant to law. New York State Constitution, Article 1, Section 11 (2025)
- Oregon: Equality of rights under the law shall not be denied or abridged by the state of Oregon or by any political subdivision in this state on account of sex. Oregon Constitution, Article I, § 46 (2014)
- Pennsylvania: Equality of rights under the law shall not be denied or abridged in the Commonwealth of Pennsylvania because of the sex of the individual. Pennsylvania Constitution, Article I, § 28 (1971)
- Texas: Equality under the law shall not be denied or abridged because of sex, race, color, creed, or national origin. This amendment is self-operative. Texas Constitution, Article I, § 3a (1972)
- Utah: The rights of citizens of the State of Utah to vote and hold office shall not be denied or abridged on account of sex. Both male and female citizens of this State shall enjoy all civil, political and religious rights and privileges. Utah Constitution, Article IV, § 1 (1896)
- Virginia: That no person shall be deprived of his life, liberty, or property without due process of law; that the General Assembly shall not pass any law impairing the obligation of contracts; and that the right to be free from any governmental discrimination upon the basis of religious conviction, race, color, sex, or national origin shall not be abridged, except that the mere separation of the sexes shall not be considered discrimination.Va. Const. art. I, § 11
- Washington: Equality of rights and responsibility under the law shall not be denied or abridged on account of sex. Washington Constitution, Article XXXI, § 1 (1972)
- Wyoming: In their inherent right to life, liberty and the pursuit of happiness, all members of the human race are equal. Since equality in the enjoyment of natural and civil rights is only made sure through political equality, the laws of this state affecting the political rights and privileges of its citizens shall be without distinction of race, color, sex, or any circumstance or condition whatsoever other than the individual incompetency or unworthiness duly ascertained by a court of competent jurisdiction. The rights of citizens of the state of Wyoming to vote and hold office shall not be denied or abridged on account of sex. Both male and female citizens of this state shall equally enjoy all civil, political and religious rights and privileges. Wyoming Constitution, Articles I and VI (1890)

== International comparison ==
In 2020, Southern Legal Council found clauses officially declaring equal rights / non-discrimination on the basis of sex in the constitutions of 168 countries.

== See also ==
- A Group of Women
- Convention on the Elimination of All Forms of Discrimination Against Women
- Coverture, never formally overturned in the United States
- Equality Act (United States)
- Equality Amendment
- Equal pay for equal work
- Feminism in the United States
- First-wave feminism
- Grassroots Group of Second Class Citizens
- History of feminism
- History of women in the United States
- Religious Committee for the ERA
