= A Catholic Statement on Pluralism and Abortion =

1984 pro-abortion rights message

The advertisement, with a list of signatories at the bottom.

"A Catholic Statement on Pluralism and Abortion", alternatively referred to by its pull quote "A Diversity of Opinions Regarding Abortion Exists Among Committed Catholics" or simply "The New York Times ad", was a full-page advertisement placed on October 7, 1984, in The New York Times by Catholics for a Free Choice (CFFC). Its publication brought to a head the conflict between the Vatican and those American Catholics who were in favor of access to abortion. The publicity and controversy which followed its publication helped to make the CFFC an important element of the abortion-rights movement.

Before mid-1984, a Catholic position paper was signed by about 80 reform-minded theologians and members of religious institutes who were sympathetic to choice in abortion. This position paper was used by CFFC as the basis for The New York Times ad. CFFC's statement said that the Catholic Church's doctrine condemning abortion as "morally wrong in all instances" was "not the only legitimate Catholic position." It said that "a large number" of Catholic theologians considered abortion to be a moral choice in some cases and cited a recent survey which found that only 11% of Catholics believed that abortion was wrong under all circumstances. It called for value pluralism and discussion within the Church on the subject. More signatures were added, bringing the total to 97 prominent Catholics including theologians, nuns, priests and lay persons.

The advertisement was intended to help 1984 vice-presidential candidate Geraldine Ferraro, a pro-abortion rights Catholic, to resist the sharp criticism directed at her by Archbishop of New York John Joseph O'Connor during the 1984 U.S. presidential election. Following the ad's publication, the U.S. Conference of Catholic Bishops denounced it and called it contrary to "the clear and consistent teaching of the church that deliberately chosen abortion is objectively immoral." Subsequently, the Vatican pursued recantings by or reprimands of the signers who were directly subject to Church authority, including 24 nuns who became known as the "Vatican 24". Some signers recanted their affiliation with CFFC; most were said by their superiors to be in line with Catholic teaching. Two nuns resisted, publicly embraced a pro-abortion rights position and eventually left their order.

== Background ==
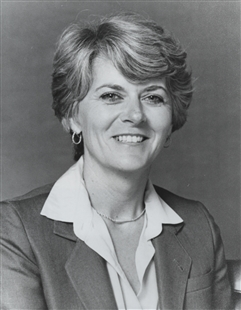
Geraldine Ferraro

In 1982, CFFC invited members of Congress to a briefing titled "The Abortion Issue in the Political Process" describing the problems facing Catholic politicians and to show that there was a range of personal and political responses to the issue of abortion. Geraldine Ferraro, then a member of the United States House of Representatives, wrote the introduction to the briefing. She wrote, "As Catholics we deal each day, both personally and politically, with the wrenching abortion issue ...the Catholic position on abortion is not monolithic and there can be a range of personal and political responses to the issue." Other endorsers of the briefing included fellow Democratic politicians Leon Panetta and Tom Daschle.

Catholic ethicist Daniel C. Maguire co-authored a position paper on abortion and religious pluralism with feminist Frances Kissling, the president of CFFC, and Maguire's wife Marjorie Reily Maguire, a theologian and CFFC activist. The position paper, titled "A Catholic Statement on Abortion", was circulated among several groups of theologians including the College Theology Society, of which Marjorie Maguire was a member, and the Catholic Theological Society of America. Those who were sympathetic to moral pluralism and the possibility of nuanced abortion positions in the Catholic Church signed the statement and formed the Catholic Committee on Pluralism and Abortion.

When Ferraro was named Walter Mondale's running mate for the Democratic Party in the 1984 election, Archbishop O'Connor and Archbishop of Boston Bernard Francis Law issued statements denouncing her position on abortion. It is likely that O'Connor targeted Ferraro because of her association with CFFC. O'Connor said that Catholic voters should not vote for pro-abortion politicians. O'Connor said Ferraro "has given the world to understand that Catholic teaching is divided on the subject of abortion", which he said was wrong. Ferraro said that her personal pro-abortion rights views were not something she would force on the nation; she said she would follow the law of the land as interpreted by the Supreme Court. After receiving more criticism from O'Connor, Ferraro acknowledged that the Church's position on abortion was indeed "monolithic", but said many Catholics "do not share the view of the Catholic Church."

== Publication ==
CFFC wanted to make clear the church's hierarchy did not speak for them. The CFFC turned the Maguire/Maguire/Kissling position paper holding about 80 signatures from leading Catholic reformers into a statement suitable for the public, and in August–September 1984 they sought further signatures from such groups as the Women Church Convergence, a group working to increase women's roles in the Church. A total of 97 signatures was gathered, including 26 nuns, two priests, and two lay brothers. The CFFC paid $30,000 for an advertisement in The New York Times, to run on a day that was the annual "Respect Life Sunday" celebrated by American bishops. The timing was intended to help Ferraro retain support in her campaign.

On October 7, 1984, one full page of The New York Times carried the combined statement of the CFFC and the other signers. At the top of the page were the bold-type words: "A Diversity of Opinions Regarding Abortion Exists Among Committed Catholics". Underneath that was the title "A Catholic Statement on Pluralism and Abortion". Following this was a citation to a poll showing only 11% of American Catholics surveyed opposed abortion in all circumstance, and an endorsement of "candid and respectful discussion" within the Church of a "diversity of opinion" held by Catholics on the issue. The bottom of the page included 97 names divided into two groups: 15 members of the Catholic Committee on Pluralism and Abortion, and 82 others in a group marked "Other Signers". The advertisement concluded by saying the list of signers was only partial—that 75 priests, members of religious institutes, and theologians had written in support "but cannot sign because they fear losing their jobs."

The second paragraph read as follows:

Statements of recent Popes and of the Catholic hierarchy have condemned the direct termination of pre-natal life as morally wrong in all instances. There is the mistaken belief in American society that this is the only legitimate Catholic position. In fact, a diversity of opinions regarding abortion exists among committed Catholics."

== Reaction ==
On November 14, 1984, following the election (which Mondale and Ferraro lost), the U.S. Conference of Catholic Bishops issued a statement saying the text of the advertisement could only represent the personal opinions of the signers because they were in contradiction to "the clear and consistent teaching of the church that deliberately chosen abortion is objectively immoral." Cardinal Jean Jerome Hamer, author of the 1974 reaffirmation against procured abortion and the prefect of the Congregation for Institutes of Consecrated Life and Societies of Apostolic Life, requested on November 30, 1984, that the signers who were subject to Church authority be required to publicly retract their position or be dismissed. This elicited a good deal of international press coverage. Of the 26 nuns, two were taken off the Vatican's list, one for unknown reasons and the other because her missionary order was not under Hamer's supervision. The remaining 24 nuns were labeled the "Vatican 24" by the press.

Some 35 of the signers met at the St. Charles Hotel in Washington, D.C., on December 19, 1984, to determine a course of action. The meeting included 18 nuns of the Vatican 24. They said the Vatican, in its stern reaction, "seeks to stifle freedom of speech and public discussion in the Roman Catholic Church and create the appearance of a consensus where none exists." The group issued a statement describing the current Church stance as not in the spirit of the Vatican II which said, "Let there be unity in what is necessary, freedom in what is unsettled and charity in any case." Sister Donna Quinn, a past president of the National Coalition of American Nuns, said, "We believe we have a right to speak out when we have a differing opinion, and this is something European men do not understand."

The four male members of institutes who signed—two priests and two lay brothers—recanted in published statements, the last on January 17, 1985. The Vatican announced that many of the nuns had also recanted.

In seeking to discipline the nuns, the Vatican did not contact any one of them personally, and did not respond to direct individual communication. Rather, the superiors of the nuns were asked to write letters verifying whether or not the nuns were in line with Catholic teaching on abortion, and a variety of responses were received from the superiors. A few nuns disavowed their position on abortion and the cases were quickly closed. Most nuns held to their earlier conviction, although their superiors sent letters saying that they accepted Church teaching. Once a nun's superior had sent a letter to the Vatican, the case was closed, without any further attempt to prevent the nun from speaking out on the issues.

Two Sisters of Notre Dame de Namur, Patricia Hussey and Barbara Ferraro (no relation to Geraldine Ferraro), did not recant from their pro-abortion rights positions. Hussey and Ferraro, directors of the Covenant House in Charleston, West Virginia—a shelter for homeless and abused women and children—were supported by CFFC in their dispute with the Church. By March 1986, Hussey and Ferraro were no longer calling for "dialogue" but were publicly demanding recognition of "a woman's right to choose." In July 1986 when the two nuns were pressured more strongly with expulsion, 11 of the other nuns who signed came forward with a statement in solidarity with them, denying a recent Vatican announcement that all nuns but Hussey and Ferraro were now aligned with the Church's position on abortion. The eleven complained of the Church's divisive tactics, which they said were intended to isolate Hussey and Ferraro. Signer Maureen Fiedler said, "I have never retracted or recanted one syllable of the Catholic Statement on Abortion and Pluralism. I continue to stand behind every word of it without the slightest reservation." After nearly four years of dispute, Hussey and Ferraro were informed by their order's leadership in June 1988 that they would not be dismissed from the order. However, the leadership of the School Sisters of Notre Dame distanced the order from Hussey and Ferraro, calling them "intransigent" and stating that they "have in practice placed themselves outside the life and mission of the congregation." The two nuns subsequently held a press conference and announced that a woman "can be publicly pro-choice and still be a nun." In July 1988, the two resigned from the Sisters of Notre Dame de Namur.

Signer Judith Vaughan, a resident of Los Angeles and a nun with the Sisters of St. Joseph of Carondelet, said, "We didn't commit a crime. All we did was say, 'Hey, there's a diversity of opinion among people [of our faith] and we need to talk about freedom of conscience.' I don't see myself as defiant." In January 1985, Monsignor John P. Languille sent a memo to all Los Angeles social service directors, ordering them to cease referring homeless women to the shelter Vaughan supervised "because of [her] pro-abortion position". Vaughan was reportedly expelled in February 1985 but in April 1986 she spoke to the Los Angeles Times to say that the Church had closed the case without requiring her to retract her statement. With the help of her superior, Sister Miriam Therese Larkin of St. Louis, Missouri, she retained her position in the order, and Languille's memo was overturned.

Yale Divinity School ethics professor Sister Margaret Farley said that her signing of the 1984 advertisement came up in early 1986 when she was to be honored with an award given by John Carroll University, a Catholic institution in Cleveland, Ohio. The Cleveland archdiocese wrote to the Vatican to determine Farley's status, and the Vatican responded that Farley "has retracted her signature from the 'Catholic Statement on Pluralism and Abortion.'" Sister Helen Amos, the president of Farley's order, the Sisters of Mercy, was quoted by the Vatican: "Sister Margaret's position is in accord with the teaching of the Church." This statement had been accepted as a recantation by Cardinal Hamer in December 1985. After learning of the Vatican response, Farley said Hamer's assumption was in error, that she had never recanted or asked that her signature be removed. She said, "What I did...was to clarify my position. And that was accepted as sufficient."

== Later events ==
Several nuns were given a platform to air their views including activist nuns such as Marjorie Tuite, Margaret Traxler, and six nuns of the order Sisters of Loretto, an order known for its work on pacifism and social justice. In some cases, signers of the statement grew more radical in their beliefs after being reprimanded by church authority. In the publicity surrounding the dispute with the nuns and the theologians, the statistics showing that most American Catholics disagreed with church teachings about abortion were repeated many times. Traxler appeared in a television spot with a tube of toothpaste, saying that you cannot put the toothpaste back in the tube. The various responses to the 1984 advertisement and its aftermath remained in the news through 1986.

On March 2, 1986, a follow-up advertisement was placed by the Committee of Concerned Catholics, signed by more than 1,000 Catholics supportive of the right to speak dissenting views on abortion and other controversial subjects. This advertisement was intended to show solidarity for the 97 signers of the 1984 advertisement who were threatened by the Church. It began, "We affirm our solidarity with all Catholics whose right to free speech is under attack." Committee member Kissling said that, though seven nuns had "clarified" their positions, "There have been no retractions; there have been no withdrawals." She said the Church's assertion that many nuns had disavowed their 1984 signing was "a lot of wishful thinking". Nine conservative Catholic lay group leaders responded with a letter to Hamer asking for quick disciplinary action against dissenting nuns. They warned that "the revolt is spreading" against the church's position on abortion, and chided the Vatican for failing to react decisively against signers of the first ad.

Some Catholic theologians who signed the statement reported being threatened with stagnation in their careers, and found that speaking engagements were canceled because of the controversy. Theologians Daniel Maguire, Rosemary Radford Ruether, Giles Milhaven, Elizabeth Jane Via, Mary I. Buckley, Kathleen M. O'Connor and Elisabeth Schüssler Fiorenza all saw their careers limited after October 1984. Sister Anne Carr felt pressured to quit the women's advisory committee assigned to assist U.S. bishops write a pastoral on women.

In August 1992, filmmakers Sylvia Morales and Jean Victor presented their PBS POV documentary about three nuns, including one of the Vatican 24. Titled "Faith Even to the Fire", the program followed statement signer Sister Judith Vaughan, who faced difficulty in Los Angeles then moved to Chicago to lead the National Assembly of Religious Women. Also featured were Sisters Marie de Pores Taylor of Oakland, California, and Rosa Marta Zarate of San Bernardino, California.

== Signers ==
Signers of the statement whose names appeared in the advertisement include:

=== Catholic Committee on Pluralism and Abortion ===
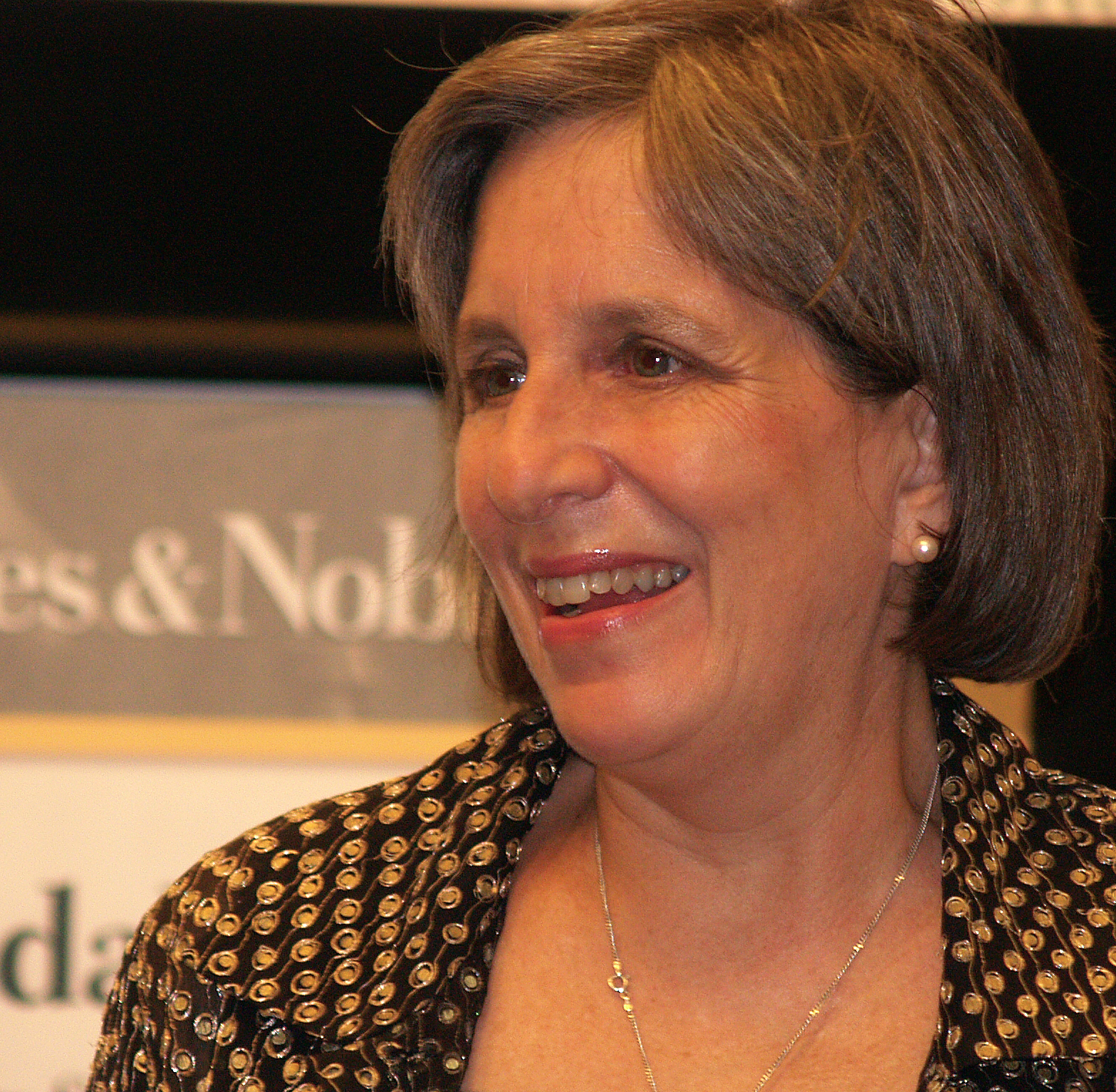
Mary Gordon in 2007

- Anthony Battaglia, Ph.D., Associate Professor, Religious Studies, California State University, Long Beach
- Roddy O'Neil Cleary, D.Min., University of Vermont
- Joseph Fahey, Ph.D., Professor, Manhattan College
- Elisabeth Schüssler Fiorenza, Ph.D., Professor, University of Notre Dame
- Mary Gordon, M.A., author of Final Payments and Company of Women
- Patricia Hennessy, J.D., New York City
- Mary E. Hunt, Ph.D., Women's Alliance for Theology, Ethics and Ritual
- Frances Kissling, Executive Director, Catholics for a Free Choice
- Justus George Lawler, Executive Editor, Academic Bookline, Winston-Seabury Press
- Daniel C. Maguire, S.T.D., theologian, widely published Catholic ethicist.
- Marjorie Reiley Maguire, Ph.D., theologian, an early and active member of CFFC.
- J. Giles Milhaven, Ph.D., Professor, Brown University
- Rosemary Radford Ruether, Ph.D. Professor, Garrett–Evangelical Theological Seminary
- Thomas Shannon, Ph.D., Professor, Worcester Polytechnic Institute
- James F. Smurl, Ph.D., Professor at Indiana University

=== Other signers ===
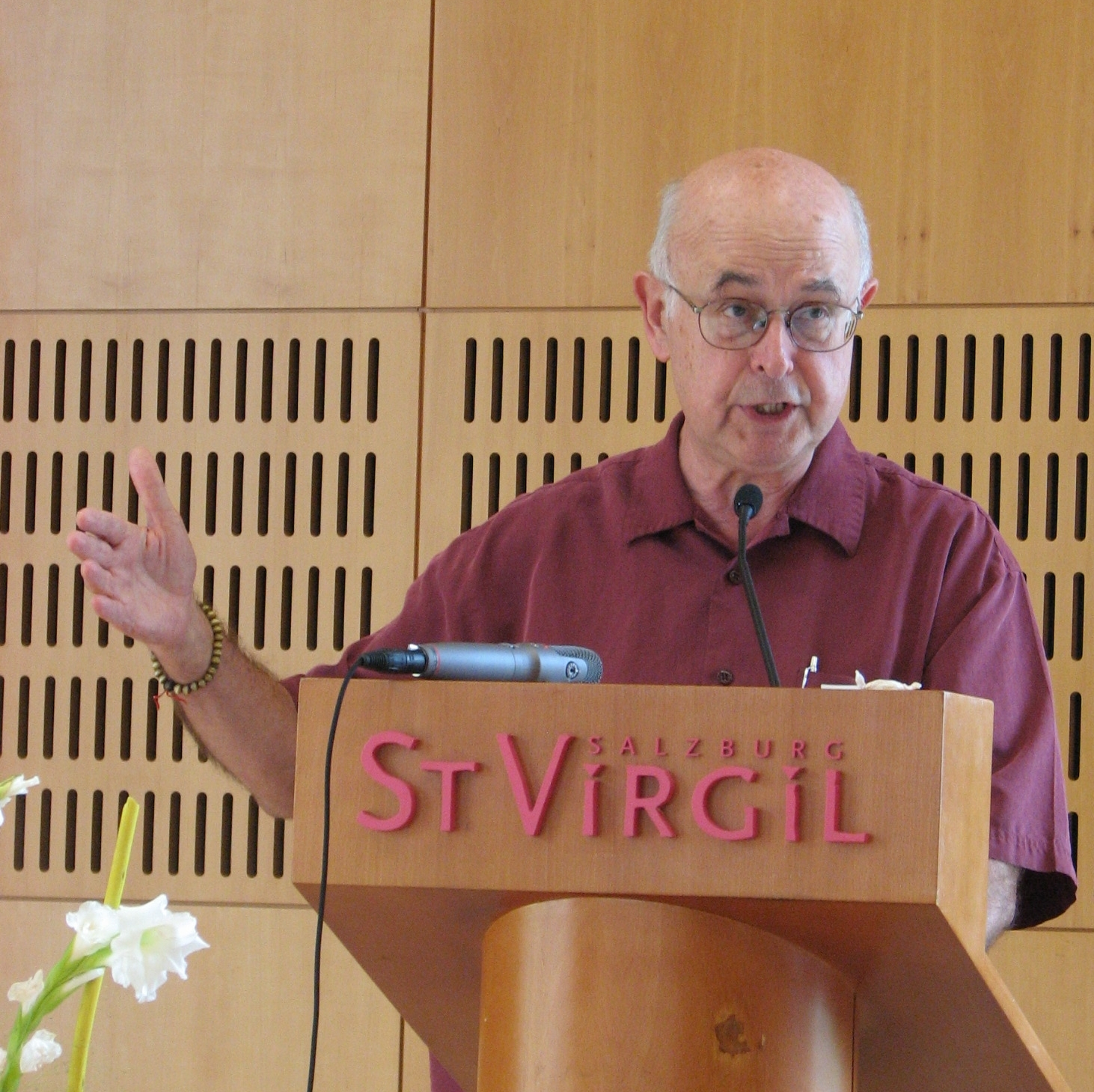
Paul F. Knitter in 2007

- Ronald Burke, Ph.D., University of Nebraska at Omaha, co-founder of The Journal of Religion & Film.
- Anne Carr, nun and theologian at the University of Chicago Divinity School.
- Patty Crowley, long-term co-leader of the Christian Family Movement.
- Margaret Farley, Ph.D., Yale Divinity School
- Barbara Ferraro, nun with Sisters of Notre Dame de Namur
- Maureen Fiedler, Ph.D., S.L., nun, pacifist, and activist for the Equal Rights Amendment 1978 to 1982. Fiedler attended the first Women's Ordination Conference in Detroit in 1975.
- Jeannine Gramick, Sister of Loreto and LGBTQ+ rights activist.
- Christine E. Gudorf, Ph.D., Xavier University
- Patricia Hussey, nun with Sisters of Notre Dame de Namur
- Paul F. Knitter, Th.D., Xavier University
- Agnes Mary Mansour, former nun, director of the Michigan Department of Social Services, former president of the University of Detroit Mercy.
- Kathleen E. McVey, Ph.D., Princeton Theological Seminary
- Jeanne L. Noble, Ph.D., New York University
- Dolly Pomerleau, co-founder of the Quixote Center
- Donna Quinn, nun, past president of the National Coalition of American Nuns.
- Jill Raitt, Ph.D., University of Missouri
- Jane Schaberg, Ph.D., University of Detroit
- Margaret Ellen Traxler, nun with the School Sisters of Notre Dame, co-founder of the National Coalition of American Nuns
- Marjorie Tuite, Dominican nun, native New Yorker, feminist
- Judith Vaughan, nun, director of the House of Ruth shelter for women, Los Angeles
- Elizabeth Jane Via, district attorney, female priest, professor at University of San Diego
- Ann Patrick Ware, S.L., nun and theology professor
- Mary Jo Weaver, author
- Arthur E. Zannoni, Ph.D., University of Notre Dame
