= Father Anne =

Self-identified Roman Catholic priest

- Born: Anne Tropeano; Massachusetts
- Education: Jesuit School of Theology
- Occupation: Catholic Priest
- Organization: Catholic Church (excommunicated)
- Known for: Women's ordination, Catholic feminism
- Movement: Women's Ordination Movement
- Website: https://www.fatheranne.com

Father Anne, born Anne Tropeano, is a Roman Catholic (excommunicated) who claims to have been ordained as a Catholic priest through a Church reform movement, called the Roman Catholic Womanpriest movement. Upon her ordination, Father Anne accepted excommunication from the Roman Catholic Church, as a sign of her respect for the Church, and as a peaceful protest of the perceived historical injustice of male-only ordination. She uses the moniker "Father Anne” to point to the theology that supports a person of any gender being able to serve in persona Christi as a priest and minister. The Roman Catholic Church teaches that women are incapable of receiving the Sacrament of Holy Orders and therefore, her ordination is not recognized by the Roman Catholic Church. She was ordained by the Association of Roman Catholic Women Priests, a movement springing from the Roman Catholic Women Priests movement, which originated with the ordination of seven women by Romulo Antonio Braschi. Roman Catholic Womenpriests maintain that their ordination is not licit, but is valid, due to their position that the theology underpinning the teaching that only men can be priests is unjust and errant.

== Call to the priesthood ==
Father Anne was born in Massachusetts and resides in New Mexico. She earned a Master's degree in Divinity from the Jesuit School of Theology in Berkeley, California. Father Anne had a varied background working in nonprofits and small business administration. She studied marketing and promotions and earned a Master's degree in Rhetoric and Writing Studies from San Diego State University. She managed an independent touring band for five years. Father Anne received Catholic sacraments when she was a child but she only began to be an active Catholic in her late 20s.

== Ordination through the womanpriest movement ==
The trend of advocating for the ordination of women by a minority of Catholics, began during the 1960s. Father Anne's work is part of this movement as she works within the womanpriest movement. She attempted ordination in her home state of New Mexico at the Cathedral of St. John in Albuquerque, an Episcopal church, in October 2021.

Father Anne is celibate and presents herself in the typical dress of a Catholic priest. She has said God called her to the priesthood saying, "God is asking me to do this and so it came down to either being obedient to the church teaching or being obedient to God, and we all know the church has changed its teachings over time on other issues." In 2020, she was a recipient of the Lucile Murray Durkin Scholarship, named after a visionary Catholic activist.

The Catholic News Agency reported promptly on her "supposed ordination" and her "simulated Mass" at St. Paul Lutheran Church in Albuquerque the following day. Glennon Jones, the vicar general of the Archdiocese of Santa Fe, confirmed the impossibility of the Church to ordain women.

According to National Catholic Reporter, there are about 250 self-proclaimed Catholic women priests around the world. Many of these women were ordained through the womanpriest movement. Pope Francis has maintained, as a matter of revelation, the impossibility of ordination to the Catholic priesthood for any women.

== God Says Now campaign ==
In 2024, Father Anne promoted her campaign for women's ordination through the slogan "God Says Now." This campaign received coverage in National Catholic Reporter and the Santa Fe New Mexican.

== BBC documentary ==
In December 2022, the BBC World Service published a documentary about Father Anne titled "The Women Fighting to Be Priests" which included film of her ordination. After the release of the BBC documentary, Father Anne called upon Pope Francis to meet with women who want to be recognized as Roman Catholic priests.

== Ministry to the LGBTQ community ==
Father Anne is an open supporter of LGBTQ Catholics and has been quoted as saying, "I especially want to minister to the LGBTQ community." In June 2022, she marched in the Albuquerque pride parade.

== Publications ==
The Shepherd Within (2025)

== See also ==
- Mary Daly
- Elizabeth Farians
- Maureen Fiedler
- Mary Hunt
- Donna Quinn
- Margaret Traxler
- Marjorie Tuite
- New Ways Ministry
- Ordination of Women
- Ordination of Women in the Catholic Church
