= Agnes Mary Mansour =

American Roman Catholic nun (1931–2004)

- Sister Agnes Mary Mansour
- Born: Josephine A. Mansour; April 10, 1931; Detroit, Michigan, U.S.
- Died: December 17, 2004 (aged 73); Farmington Hills, Michigan, U.S.
- Resting place: Holy Sepulchre Cemetery, Southfield, Michigan, U.S.
- Education: Mercy College; Catholic University; Georgetown University
- Employer(s): Mercy College of Detroit; Michigan Department of Social Services
- Organization: Sisters of Mercy
- Awards: Michigan Women's Hall of Fame (1988)

Agnes Mary Mansour (April 10, 1931 – December 17, 2004) was an American former Catholic nun, as well as a politician and public official. She is known for having been given a choice from the Vatican in 1983 to end her religious vows or to resign from her position as the director of the Michigan Department of Social Services, which required her to support and allocate public funding for abortions. The controversy involved her belief that abortion was tragic but should be legal, despite her religious vows and the teachings of the Catholic Church.

After graduating from college in Detroit, Mansour entered religious life with the Sisters of Mercy and earned a doctorate in biochemistry. She served as the president of Mercy College of Detroit from 1971 to 1983. She ran unsuccessfully for public office in 1982, in the process provoking comment from the Archbishop of Detroit.

The governor of Michigan appointed her to lead the state's social services department, and she was confirmed in early 1983. During this time, the Archbishop of Detroit and Vatican officials asked Mansour declare herself against abortion—as her department was responsible for abortion services funded through Medicaid. Mansour refused to make such a statement, and two months after her confirmation as director, she was required by the Vatican to decide whether she was to continue as director or as a nun. She chose to give up her vows as a nun.

After serving out her appointment, she was inducted into the Michigan Women's Hall of Fame in 1988.

== Early life and education ==
Josephine A. Mansour was born in Detroit, Michigan to Lebanese immigrants on April 10, 1931, the fourth of four children in her family, all girls. She was baptized in the Maronite branch of Eastern Catholicism.

After finishing St. Charles High School in Detroit's East Side, she graduated from Mercy College in 1953 with a Bachelor of Science degree in medical technology and chemistry. She entered the Sisters of Mercy, assuming the name Sister Agnes Mary on September 7, 1953, transferring to the Latin Rite of the Catholic Church. She continued her education at Catholic University in Washington D.C., earning a Master of Science degree in chemistry in 1958.

On August 16, 1959, she took perpetual vows to become a nun. The name "Agnes" ("lamb" in Latin) and a pious motto were thrust upon her by her superiors: "Sweet heart of Jesus, be my love." She bridled under the motto, which she wore on a ring, finally removing the ring in 1979 and choosing her own motto: "Free to be Faithful". She entered Georgetown University and earned a doctorate in biochemistry in 1964. Regarding a harmful side effect of the use of chloroquine in the treatment of malaria, dangerous to the eyes, she co-authored The Ocular Deposition of Chloroquine, with Howard Bernstein, Nathan Zvaifler and Martin Rubin. After receiving her doctorate, Mansour returned to Chicago and accepted the chairmanship of the Mercy College Department of Physical Science and Mathematics. She also coached the basketball team.

Mansour studied academic administration in the American Council on Education (ACE) Fellows program at the University of Kentucky. In 1971, she began serving as president of Mercy College of Detroit, staying in the position until 1983. As president, she greatly expanded enrollment and facilities at Mercy College, doubling the number of degree programs while balancing the budget with increased endowments. After 1987, she served as visiting professor to Michigan State University and Wayne State University.

== Public service ==
In 1982, Mansour ran in a primary election for United States House of Representatives representing Michigan's 17th congressional district, held on August 3. She said of her campaign, "I look at politics as a legitimate extension of my work as a Sister of Mercy." In a field of four Democratic Party candidates, Sander M. Levin won with more than seven times the votes received by Mansour, who picked up only 6.4% of the electorate.

Mansour's run for office came as a surprise to Edmund Szoka, the Archbishop of Detroit. At the time, the Vatican allowed members of religious orders to hold political office, but the candidate was required to gain the approval of the local bishop. Mansour did not do so. She told reporters that canon law was an "old set of rules that are invoked when somebody wants to invoke them, and ignored when someone wants to ignore them." Szoka accepted her excuse that she did not know to ask permission.

=== Michigan Social Services ===
After the general election in November 1982, the incoming Michigan governor, James Blanchard, appointed Mansour in December to the directorship of the Michigan Department of Social Services (DSS); Michigan's biggest agency. The administrative position involved oversight of public health programs including disbursement of some $5 million in federal monies from Medicaid for abortions. To accept the appointment, she asked for and received permission from her order and from Szoka. Szoka asked Mansour to publicly state her opposition to abortion; he said he originally gave his approval on this condition. Mansour did not follow his request. Though claiming she was personally opposed to abortion, she knew that many others felt differently, and she determined that the poor should have equal access to abortion as long as it was legal.

Mansour assumed the directorship on December 29, 1982, pending Michigan legislative confirmation in the position. Archbishop Szoka hardened his resolve, on February 23, 1983, directed the Detroit Province of the Sisters of Mercy to determine whether Mansour was in violation of the teachings of the Church. He told the Detroit Sisters leadership that Mansour no longer had his permission to serve the state, and he ordered them to inform her that she was to resign the state appointment. Indications were that most of metropolitan Detroit's 1.2 million Catholics sided with the Archbishop.

Detroit archdiocese spokesman Jay Berman said of a protest by the National Coalition of American Nuns (NCAN): "Their efforts are confusing Catholics and misrepresenting 2,000 years of Church teaching on the sanctity of human life." Archbishop Szoka said, "It is a question of my absolute duty to stand for, to protect and to defend the doctrine of the Church which has to do with human life." On March 4, Archbishop Szoka met again with the leadership of the Detroit Sisters of Mercy, and he restated his directive. The Sisters determined they did not have to obey Szoka if "a greater good was involved", and refused to force Mansour to quit her job.

On March 8, Mansour was confirmed in her appointment by the Michigan Senate with a vote of 28 to 9. She said, "I recognize that we live in a morally pluralistic society that government must be respectful of, and that my morality may not be someone else's morality." She told the Senate that she was personally against abortion but that she could tolerate the part of her job involving the disbursement of Medicaid funds to hospitals that performed abortions on women with little or no money.

On March 10, Archbishop Szoka reported the situation to the Vatican. The Vatican delegated Archbishop Pio Laghi to address the matter, and he sent a message to Sister Theresa Kane, the national president of the Sisters of Mercy, telling Kane that she must convince Mansour to resign as director of DSS. Kane refused, as did Detroit Provincial Superior Emily George who was the Vice President of the Sisters of Mercy of the Union.

On April 11, the day after Mansour's 52nd birthday, Sister Kane requested a formal hearing on the matter from the Congregation for Religious and Secular Institutes, a Vatican body that dealt with nuns and religious orders. On April 16, the Congregation instructed Anthony Bevilacqua, Auxiliary Bishop of Brooklyn who was visiting Rome with other bishops, that he was "to approach Sister Agnes Mary Mansour directly and to require, in the name of the Holy See and by virtue of her vow of obedience, that she immediately resign as director" of DSS. Pope John Paul II had in the past restricted the right of priests to serve in political offices, forcing the resignation of a member of Congress. Around this time, Mansour asked for and received permission for a leave of absence from the Sisters of Mercy, so that she could carry out her state appointment free of conflict with the Church.

Bevilacqua sent a letter directly to Mansour without communicating his intention to President Kane or any of the Detroit leaders of the Sisters of Mercy. The action was unusual because a Catholic bishop normally restricted his communications to the authorities of a religious order, not the individual members. In the letter, Bevilacqua told Mansour she was to meet him in person, and that she could bring with her two local sisters for moral support. She selected Sister Helen Marie Burns, Ph.D. (Detroit Sisters of Mercy) and the order's Provincial Superior, Emily George. On May 9, 1983, Bevilacqua met with the three women and told Mansour she must immediately decide whether to resign the directorship or her vows. Shocked at the sudden demand, for 80 minutes she contemplated the decision, then finally "with deep regret, sorrow, and limited freedom" signed the papers Bevilacqua had provided for requesting dispensation from her perpetual vows, voiding her leave of absence. After nearly 30 years of being in religious orders, she gave up her life as a nun.

The NCAN joined with the National Assembly of Religious Women (NARW) to issue a joint statement: "The Roman Congregation for Religious in their fear of losing 'authority' has ignored the principle of freedom of conscience." The NCAN and NARW requested sympathetic religious women to take part in a protest on Pentecost Sunday, May 22, 1983, "as a visible witness to the arrogant use of power in a male dominated Church." Small protests were organized at cathedrals in Chicago and Washington, D.C. Ms. magazine reported that Sister Donna Quinn, president of NCAN, said that the Pope's demand for obedience "tramples on who we are as women religious in the United States". Ms. writer Mary Kay Blakely added that she thought Mansour was correct in saying that "the Pope doesn't understand the American people, and he doesn't understand the American nun". Divided over the Mansour affair, the Catholic Theological Society of America passed an unsuccessful resolution asking for dialog rather than simple administrative decisions which "violate both the theological meaning of authority in the church and the sacredness of conscience of church members".

In 1983, Mansour was offered money for the film rights to the story of her life. She said that she would accept on condition that the money was enough to balance Michigan's state deficit, $900 million at the time. No film rights were obtained. Mansour remained director of DSS until 1987. Under her leadership, the department's error rate dropped to its lowest levels in awarding food stamps, Medicaid funds, and Aid to Families with Dependent Children (AFDC). She increased the investigation and conviction of fraud cases, and she achieved the highest national record of locating deadbeat parents for collecting child support. She streamlined office procedures and initiated programs to curtail teenage pregnancy and to assist teenage mothers. She broadened the state program benefiting victims of domestic abuse.

=== Poverty alleviation ===
In 1987, Mansour accepted an executive adviser position with Mercy Health Services Special Initiative to the Poor. In 1988, she founded the Poverty and Social Reform Institute (PSRI) with the mission of helping increase the health and education of children living in poverty. PSRI established two child care centers in Detroit, named "Leaps and Bounds".

Mansour served on many executive boards, including PSRI, Sisters of Mercy Health Corporation, Women's Economic Club, Michigan Bell Telephone, the National Bank of Detroit and the National Association of Independent Colleges and Universities.

== Position on abortion ==
Mansour personally disapproved of abortion. However, she held the belief that, because abortion was legal, it should be equally available to all women, poor and rich. In July 1982 during her unsuccessful political campaign, Mansour wrote a "Position Paper on Abortion and Legislation". In late summer 1984, she joined 96 other leading theologians, nuns and priests who signed another position paper titled "A Catholic Statement on Pluralism and Abortion", asking for Catholic discussion about abortion and requesting religious pluralism in Catholicism. Mansour and the Sisters of Mercy made their 1980s decisions based on their belief that the Second Vatican Council of 1962–1965 promised freedom of conscience in such cases. Mercy nuns believed that they held rights not to obey.

== Illness ==
The Sisters of Mercy did not honor Mansour's 1983 resignation of her vows. They continued to consider her a member of the order. Around 1993, Mansour discovered breast cancer and survived treatment for it. When the cancer returned a decade later, spreading to her bones and lungs, she was invited to stay at McAuley Center, in Farmington Hills, Michigan; a rest home operated by the Sisters of Mercy. Facing death, Mansour said she was not bitter about the Vatican's action, only hurt.

== Death and legacy ==
Mansour died on December 17, 2004, aged 73. She was buried at Holy Sepulchre Cemetery, Southfield, Michigan, in the Sisters of Mercy cemetery plot. Sister Linda Werthman, the President of the Detroit Regional Community of the Sisters of Mercy, said, "She never stopped being a Sister of Mercy in her heart and many of us never stopped thinking of her in that way. Throughout the years, her commitment to serving those who suffer from poverty, sickness and lack of education has been unwavering."

Theologian Richard A. McCormick wrote in 2006 that Church officials abused their authority in the Mansour case, and brought "the teaching office into disrepute". Author Kenneth A. Briggs, former religion editor for The New York Times, wrote that the Mansour case "was in many respects the most dramatic, but not the only, instance of a particular nun singled out for punishment". Theologian Margaret Farley, a Sister of Mercy and a professor at Yale University, said, "It was a painful truth that [Mansour] had to leave, that the Church declared her officially not a member. There was suffering in the community, and also for her. When she left she was quoted as saying that she would always be a Sister of Mercy in her heart. And that has absolutely been the case. She continued in works of mercy all her life."
