= Religious Committee for the ERA =

- Type: Women's Rights Organization
- Purpose: Activist group for the Equal Rights Amendment
- Key people: Sister Marjorie Tuite, Sister Mary Luke Tobin

Religious Committee for the ERA was an American women's rights organization active in the late 1970s and early 1980s that advocated for the ratification of the Equal Rights Amendment (ERA).

== Overview ==
The Religious Committee for the ERA was an organization of faith based feminists who planned a series of events to raise awareness of the need for an Equal Rights Amendment to the U.S. Constitution. The organization had eight founders. The organization included Catholics, Jewish supporters, Quakers, Presbyterians and many others from a wide variety of faith traditions. After the ERA failed to pass in June 1982, the organization changed its name to Religious Network for Equality of Women. They were also known as Renew.

== Timeline of political activity ==
- 1978: People of Faith for ERA: Days of Prayer and Action
- 1980: Inter-religious Lobby Day
- 1982: National Prayer Vigil in Washington, D.C.
- 1982: On June 30, members of The Religious Committee for the ERA burned copies of laws that discriminated against women in front of the National archives.

== Members ==
- Louise Bowman
- Marian Coger
- Mrs. C.L. Dillard
- Theodore Hesburgh
- Joan M. Martin
- Abigail McCarthy
- Rev. Delores Moss
- Eleanor R. Schwartz
- Natalie Tackett
- Sister Mary Luke Tobin
- Sister Marjorie Tuite
- Margaret Wilkins

== Affiliated organizations ==
- American Baptist Women
- Catholics Act for ERA
- Church Women United
- Las Hermanas
- Leadership Conference of Women Religious
- National Assembly of Women Religious
- National Coalition of American Nuns
- Sisters of Loretto
- St. Joan's International Alliance
