= Ethne =

Ethne may refer to:

- Ethne, alternative spelling for Ethniu
- Ethne Kennedy (1921–2005), American religious worker and activist

== See also ==
- Ethna
