= Renewal =

Renew or renewal may refer to:

== Media and entertainment ==
- Renew (album), a 2002 album by The Badlees
- Renewal (film), a 2008 documentary on the religious environmental movement
- Renewal (magazine), a UK journal of Labour politics
- Renewal (Kreator album), a 1992 album by Kreator
- Renewal (Billy Strings album), a 2021 album by Billy Strings
- "Renewal", a 2010 song by Norwegian Black Metal band Dimmu Borgir from their album Abrahadabra
- "Renewal", a 2025 song by Swiss progressive thrash metal band Coroner from their album Dissonance Theory
- "Renewal", an episode of the sixth season of TV series Law & Order: Criminal Intent
- "Renewal" (Brooklyn Nine-Nine), an episode of the eighth season of Brooklyn Nine-Nine
- "Renewal" or The New Mutants, a graphic novel
- "Renewal", the 26th episode of the anime series Death Note

== Law ==
- Contract renewal
- Copyright renewal, the act of renewing copyright
- Renewal of an expiring law or Act of Parliament
- Renewal (broadcasting), the act for renewing a television series for further seasons
- Renewal (parliamentary procedure), bringing up a motion again that has already been disposed of by the deliberative assembly
- Renewal (patent), a maintenance fee

== Religion ==
- Renewal (religion), collective term for the charismatic, Pentecostal and neo-charismatic churches
- Jewish Renewal, a movement in Judaism
- Catholic Charismatic Renewal, a movement in the Roman Catholic Church
- Renewal Christian Centre, a British megachurch in Solihull

== Politics ==
- Renew Europe, a political group in the European Parliament
- Renewal (Transnistria), a political party in Transnistria
- Renew Party, a British political party launched in 2018
- EU Project Renew, a European Union project concerning biomass fuel production
- Renew, a name by which a 1970s-80s US group advocating for an Equal Rights Amendment, Religious Committee for the ERA, was known

== Other ==
- Urban renewal, a function of urban planning
- Renewal theory, a branch of probability theory
- Renewal, in psychology, learned fear returns after extinction
- Renewalism, a concept in the theory of international relations that holds that a state's ability to renew itself is the test of a great power
- Remise (fencing), an attack
- Renew Foundation, a non-governmental organization for empowering women and children exploited through human trafficking and prostitution
- ReNEW Schools, a New Orleans charter school operator
- Renewal Batteries, a type of rechargeable alkaline batteries made by Rayovac
- Renew, an Australian not-for-profit that publishes ReNew magazine
- ReNews, a Hong Kong online news outlet
