= Donna Quinn =

American nun and feminist (1937–2021)

Donna Quinn was an American Catholic nun and a lifelong feminist activist who was known for her involvement with the National Coalition of American Nuns and association with Women-Church Convergence (W-CC).

== Catholic Statement on Pluralism and Abortion ==
In 1984 Donna Quinn was one of the Catholic nuns who signed on to the Catholic Statement on Pluralism and Abortion. Maureen Fielder, Barbara Ferraro and Patricia Hussey also signed this statement. The backlash against the nuns for signing this statement was swift and they received significant pressure from the Vatican. In a December 1984 statement, the group pushed back against the leadership of the Catholic church saying, "We believe that this Vatican action is a cause for scandal to Catholics everywhere. It seeks to stifle freedom of speech and public discussion in the Roman Catholic Church." That year Quinn appeared on The Phil Donahue Show. Long after she signed the 1984 statement, Quinn continued to advocate for women's right to abortion. As late as 2009 she served as a clinic escort, helping women access their legal right to abortion care.

== Social justice work ==
In 1974 Donna Quinn was one of the founders of Chicago Catholic Women, an advocacy group for women's rights within the Catholic Church. She also supported women's rights to contraception and called for the pope to support a female archbishop. Quinn was credited in Elle Magazine as an inspiration for young Catholic women. She also belonged to a club with feminist theologian Mary Hunt called "The best and the brightest of the bad girls."

== Women's ordination movement ==
Quinn was one of the most visible Catholic sisters who supported women's ordination in the Catholic Church. She often spoke out against patriarchy in the church and was unafraid to protest against the Vatican directly. She wrote a book about her involvement with this movement titled, "Chicago Catholic Women: Its Role in Founding the Catholic Women's Movement."

== AIDS activism ==
She often challenged the hierarchy of the Catholic Church, including when it came to the AIDS crisis. In 1994 she was quoted as saying, "To oppose condoms is immoral and murderous."

== Advocacy for LGBTQ+ issues ==
Quinn was very public in her support for LGBTQIA+ rights. She was quoted as saying, "I want a church that is moral, that is just, that is all-inclusive. I want to say that this is my church." According to theologian Mary Hunt, Quinn spoke out in support of the LGBTQ+ community at a time where few Catholics were willing to do so.

== Personal life ==
Donna Quinn was born in Wisconsin. She graduated high school in 1955 and was a longtime resident of Chicago and a member of the Dominican order of Catholic nuns. In addition to her work as a feminist activist, she worked a teacher, administrator and admissions director. She died on July 30, 2021, at the age of 84.

== See also ==
- Catholics for Choice
- Catholic Statement on Pluralism and Abortion
- Father Anne
- National Coalition of American Nuns
- Margaret Traxler
- Marjorie Tuite
- Ann Patrick Ware, S.L.
