= Jeanne L. Noble =

American academic

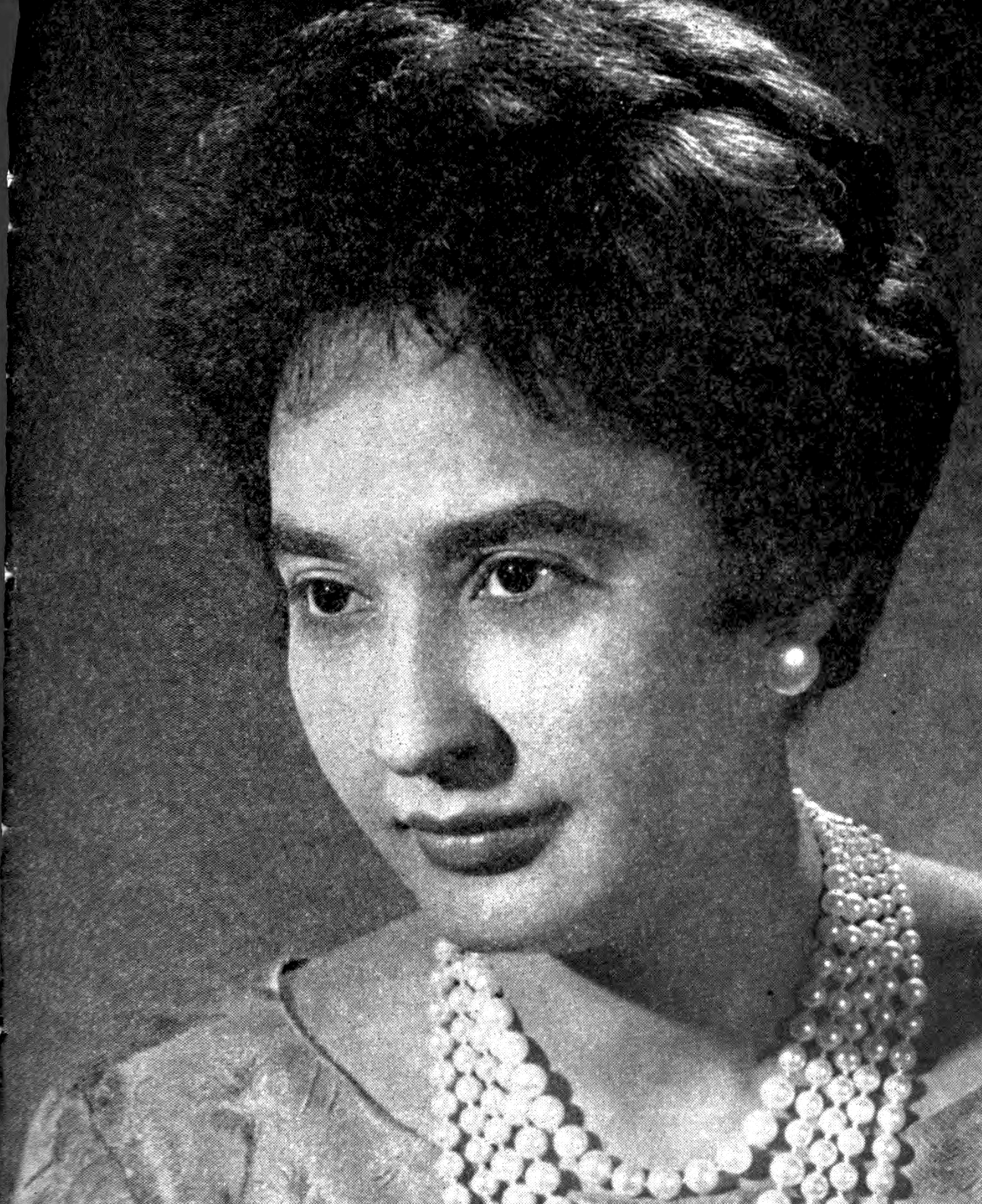
- Jeanne L. Noble, from a 1963 publication of the United States federal government
- Born: July 18, 1926; Albany, Georgia, USA
- Died: October 17, 2002 (aged 76); New York City
- Education: Doctorate
- Alma mater: Howard University; Columbia University
- Occupations: Educator, college administrator, counselor, consultant, author, television producer
- Employer(s): Langston University; New York University

Jeanne Laveta Noble (July 18, 1926 – October 17, 2002) was an American educator who served on education commissions for three U.S. presidents. Noble was the first to analyze and publish the experiences of African American women in college. She served as president of the Delta Sigma Theta (DST) sorority within which she founded that group's National Commission on Arts and Letters. Noble was the first African-American board member of the Girl Scouts of the USA, and the first to serve the U.S. government's Defense Department Advisory Committee on Women in the Services (DACOWITS). She headed the Women's Job Corps Program in the 1960s, and was the first African-American woman to be made full professor at the New York University's Steinhardt School of Culture, Education, and Human Development.

Noble wrote several books including The Negro Woman's College Education and Beautiful, Also, Are the Souls of My Black Sisters.

== Early life and education ==
Jeanne Laveta Noble was born in Albany, Georgia on July 18, 1926, the first child of Floyd and Aurelia Noble. After three boys were born to the couple, Floyd Noble left his family around 1930 or 1931. Child-rearing duties fell to Aurelia Noble, who operated a custom drapery business and taught drapery making at the Albany Area Vocational School, and her mother Maggie Brown, a first grade teacher. Grandmother Brown stressed to Noble the importance of education. During her childhood, Noble attended an Episcopal church favored by her mother.

Noble earned a B.A. degree in psychology and sociology from Howard University in 1946. Her adviser was E. Franklin Frazier, and her teachers included Alain LeRoy Locke and Sterling Allen Brown. From Howard, Noble went to Columbia University and earned an M.A. in 1948. Returning home, she taught summer school at Albany State College. Later she said of the experience, "I fell in love with teaching and never left [the field]." After two years Albany State, Noble accepted a position as dean of women at Langston University in Oklahoma. Two years later, she re-enrolled at Columbia University to pursue a doctorate. With a grant from Pi Lambda Theta, she studied black college women and analyzed data relative to their backgrounds, educations, and achievements. In 1955 she earned her doctorate in educational psychology and counseling. She studied for a time in England at the University of Birmingham.

== Career ==
For her dissertation and first book, The Negro Woman's College Education (published in 1956), Noble examined the lives of 1,000 African-American women graduates who had been out of college at least five years. An early nonfiction book written by an African-American woman about African-American women for a white audience, it was one of the first studies to consider gender in concert with race. Pioneering educator Esther Lloyd-Jones wrote the foreword to this ground-breaking, progressive work. It won the Pi Lambda Theta, National Association for Women in Education Research Award. The next year, she published a summary in The Journal of Negro Education, titled "Negro Women Today and Their Education".

With her doctorate in hand, Noble was hired by New York University in 1959 as an associate professor teaching at the Center for Human Relations in the Steinhardt School of Culture, Education, and Human Development, a school of sociology. In 1960 Noble and co-author Margaret Fisher, the dean of South Florida University, published College Education as Personal Development to be used in college orientation courses by first-year college students. When Noble advanced to full professor, she said that she was probably the first African-American female to do so at a major university primarily catering to white students. Other lecturer positions Noble held during her career included summer visiting professorships at the University of Vermont and at the Tuskegee Institute. She also served as assistant dean of students at City College of New York, a counseling position.

Outside of the classroom, Noble served on many boards and commissions. From 1958 to 1963 Noble was the national president of the Delta Sigma Theta sorority, a public service organization she joined while an undergraduate at Howard University. Noble later served Delta as chair of its Arts and Letters, and Rituals and Ceremonies Commissions. Before taking the presidency she responded as vice president with financial assistance and moral support to the Little Rock Nine. Later, as president, she helped DST work to desegregate her hometown, Albany. Under her leadership, DST opened a chapter in Liberia and sponsored a maternity wing in a remote Kenyan hospital. She instituted new programs such as the "Teen Lift" mentors and the Commission on Arts and Letters. As she passed the baton to her successor, Ebony magazine named her "one of the 100 most influential Negroes of the Emancipation Centennial Year [1963]."

From 1960 to 1963 Noble served on the Defense Advisory Committee of the U.S. Department of Defense. In 1962 she was part-time director of Training for the Harlem Domestic Peace Corps. She was appointed to the Committee on Federal Employment of the President's Commission on the Status of Women in 1963. She was also on the board of directors of the Urban League of Greater New York, the Girl Scouts of the US, and the National Social Welfare Assembly. In 1964, President Lyndon B. Johnson tapped Noble to help him plan the Women's Job Corps, a program of his announced War on Poverty. She worked for five months on a 40-page plan to increase jobs for girls and women aged 16 to 21; a demographic that was vulnerable and in great need of employment. Noble recommended to Johnson that a woman should be named director of the program. Later presidents Richard M. Nixon and Gerald R. Ford also asked Noble to serve on educational and investigative commissions.

In 1972 Noble took a leave of absence from NYU to function as executive vice president of the National Council of Negro Women under a grant from the Ford Foundation and the Rockefeller Foundation. Around 1975 Noble moved from NYU to Brooklyn College of the City University of New York where she taught in the education department, eventually becoming a professor of guidance and counseling in the graduate school. In 1973 with Roscoe Lee Browne she produced Roses and Revolutions, a record album funded by DST. In 1976, Noble produced Beautiful, Also, Are the Souls of My Black Sisters: A History of the Black Woman in America, a "psychosocial montage" based on her research on African American women.

Noble also ventured into television in the 1970s. She won a regional Emmy Award for her New York-area television program The Learning Experience which she wrote and moderated; it aired weekly on WCBS-TV in the 1970s. In 1979, Noble co-hosted the TV program Straight Talk. Natalie Cole appeared in an anti-drug abuse public service spot produced by Noble.

== Final years ==
In 1984 Noble signed A Catholic Statement on Pluralism and Abortion in support of women's rights to abortion, noting her affiliation with the National Assembly of Religious Women. Noble was active in the Episcopal church in New York City. In the 1990s, she was named professor emeritus of Brooklyn College and of the City University of New York's Graduate Center. In 1996 Noble helped to launch the Dorothy I. Height Leadership Institute of the National Council of Negro Women with funding from the W.K. Kellogg Foundation. The institute was conceived to foster a cadre of young leaders to assist traditional African-American women's organizations to meet the challenges of the 21st century. For a variety of reasons, the institute was not able to sustain funding once its initial three-year grant was exhausted.

On October 17, 2002, Noble died at New York University Medical Center of congestive heart failure.
