= Mary E. Hunt =

American theologian

- Born: 1951 (age 74–75)
- Education: Marquette University, 1972 Harvard Divinity School, 1974 Jesuit School of Theology, 1979 Graduate Theological Union, 1980
- Occupation: Theologian

Mary E. Hunt (born 1951) is an American feminist theologian who is co-founder and co-director of the Women's Alliance for Theology, Ethics and Ritual (WATER) in Silver Spring, Maryland, US. A Catholic active in the women-church movement, she lectures and writes on theology and ethics with particular attention to social justice concerns.

== Early life and education ==
Hunt grew up in an Irish Catholic family in Syracuse, New York, and attended parochial schools. In high school she volunteered at an inner city program and a Native American reservation. She witnessed what she later described as "grinding poverty" during two summer experiences with the Christian Appalachian Project in Kentucky.

Hunt earned her undergraduate degree in theology and philosophy from Marquette University in 1972.

She completed her master's in theological studies at Harvard Divinity School in 1974. There she was a student of the Catholic theologian Rosemary Radford Ruether, who introduced the issues of gender and sexuality into the curriculum. She also studied with Jesuit priest and liberation theologian Juan Luis Segundo, who introduced issues of economics and international relations.

In 1979, Hunt received a second master's degree in divinity from the Jesuit School of Theology at Berkeley. In 1980 she received her Ph.D. from the Graduate Theological Union in Berkeley, California.

== Career ==
In 1984 she was one of 97 theologians and religious persons who signed "A Catholic Statement on Pluralism and Abortion", calling for religious pluralism and discussion within the Catholic Church regarding the church's position on abortion.

In 2018 she was one of many religious commenting on the church crisis of the sexual abuse of nuns by male clerics. She said the problem is one example of more profound and widespread "spiritual abuse" of women by the male-dominated church.

== See also ==
- Elizabeth Farians
- Donna Quinn
- Margaret Traxler
- Marjorie Tuite
