= Elizabeth Farians =

American religious studies scholar, activist and feminist

- in 2006
- Born: 10 April 1923; Cincinnati, Ohio
- Died: 21 October 2013
- Education: Saint Mary's College of Notre Dame, Doctorate in Theology, 1958
- Occupations: Women's Rights Activist, Scholar, Animal Rights Activist
- Known for: Catholic Feminism
- Movement: Equal Rights Amendment, Women's Liberation Movement

Elizabeth Farians (10 April 1923 – 21 October 2013) was an American religious studies scholar and feminist. She was an early member the National Organization of Women and is considered the first Catholic feminist to organize public protests and for over forty years she led a public fight against discrimination in religion. Farians was an activist for animal rights and veganism.

== Teaching career ==
Elizabeth Farians, also known as Betty, taught in K-12 schools as well as at the university level. In the 1940s, she was a physical education teacher at Our Lady of Angels High School in the city of St. Bernard, Ohio. She also taught P.E. in Terre Haute, Indiana and at Loyola University in Chicago.

In 1970, while working at Loyola University, she testified in front of Congress in support of the Equal Rights Amendment. Farians was still teaching as late as 2008 when she taught a course on theology and animals at Xavier University.

== NOW Task Force on Women and Religion ==
Farians created the Ecumenical Task Force on Women and Religion in 1966. According to journalist Patricia Miller, "...Farians convinced [Betty]Friedan that religion was the "root cause" of women's oppression and should be included as a core issue for the largely secular women's rights movement. Farians had personally experienced discrimination within the religious community as a result of her sex and these experiences helped fuel her activism. She said the hierarchy of the church was stuck in a "women-sex-sin syndrome."

In June 1966, Farians became the first woman to attend an annual meeting of the Catholic Theological Society of America. When she tried to attend a dinner at this event, one of the priests promised to have her thrown out of the meeting. Before the creation of the National Organization for Women (NOW), Farians was a member of St. Joan's International Alliance, a more moderate group of Catholic feminists who supported the Equal Rights Amendment. Farians was one of the founders of NOW when it was created in 1966. In the 1960s, Farians was a leader of NOW's Ecumenical Task Force one of the seven original task forces. Farians claimed that women were enraged with inequality within the church and would soon undertake significant resistance. In 1970 she was quoted in The New York Times saying, "Some day soon some pastor is going to tell a woman she can't read the epistle and she's going to pop him one. We're not encouraging it but it's going to happen. The women are enraged."

== NOW's Ecumenical Task Force on Women and Religion ==
Farians was the head of the National Organization for Women's Ecumenical Task Force on Women and Religion from 1966 to 1972, a group she founded. Part of her work with this organization was to gather support for the Equal Rights Amendment among faith based feminists. She did this in part through her creation of the group Catholics for the ERA. As historian Patricia Miller has noted, by 1970, Farians "was the national voice for Catholic feminism." Farians was personally devout and was quoted in 1974 as saying, "We will reflect the image of God in individualized variation. The Coming of Woman will be the final humanization of the species. Man and woman will relate to each other truly for the first time..."

== Catholics for a Free Choice ==
Farians was an outspoken proponent of reproductive rights. She served on the board of the Catholic feminist group Catholics for a Free Choice in the early 1970s. It was reported in the New York Daily News that she was allegedly fired from teaching at Loyola University in Chicago in 1972 for being outspoken in support of abortion rights.

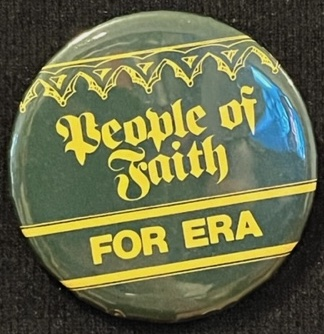
A button worn by people of faith who supported the Equal Rights Amendment

== Congressional testimony for the Equal Rights Amendment ==
In May 1970, Farians testified before Congress on behalf of the Equal Rights Amendment. Alice Paul encouraged her to testify to counter the narrative from Catholic bishops that the ERA was incompatible with Catholicism. Another faith based feminist who testified in front of Congress on behalf of the ERA in the 1970s was Reverend Joan Martin.

== St. Joan's Alliance ==
In 1965, Farians became involved with the U.S. chapter of St. Joan's Alliance, an organization of Catholic feminist women. She worked alongside notable Catholic feminist Frances McGillicuddy to bring this organization from the UK to the United States. Mary Daly was also a member of St. Joan's Alliance and a frequent collaborator with Farians.

== Loyola University lawsuit ==
Elizabeth Farians was hired as a theology professor by Loyola University in 1968. Her contract was not renewed in the summer of 1970, the same year she testified in front of Congress for the ERA, and as a result she filed a lawsuit claiming discrimination based on sex. Newspapers such as the New York Daily News speculated she was terminated due to her position on abortion.

== Personal life ==
Farians was born to Hilda and Charles Farians in Cincinnati, Ohio in 1923. She earned her Ph.D. in 1958. She was a prominent activist for animal rights.

She became a vegan in 1980. She was a vegan for over thirty years and was active with an animal rights group known as Animal Rights Community. She also co-founded the organization Feminists for Animal Rights. She died in 2013 and her funeral was held in Cincinnati, Ohio.

== Publications by Farians ==
- Institute for the Study, Redefinition and Resocialization of Women: A Program for Colleges and Universities (1971)
- The Double Cross: Writings on Women and Religion (1973)

== See also ==
- Catholics for Choice
- Mary Daly
- Georgia Fuller
- Mary Hunt
- Frances Kissling
- Rosemary Radford Ruether
