= Katie Booth (scientist) =

American biomedical chemist and civil rights activist (1907 - 2005)

- Born: May 23, 1907; Gulfport, Mississippi, US
- Died: August 26, 2006 (aged 99); Gulfport, Mississippi, US
- Education: Philander Smith University; Illinois Institute of Technology
- Occupation: Biomedical chemist
- Employer: Chicago Medical School
- Organization: Operation PUSH

Katie Booth (née Patterson, May 23, 1907 – August 26, 2006) was an African American biomedical chemist and civil rights activist.

== Early life ==
Katie Booth was born in Gulfport, Mississippi on May 23, 1907 to Joseph Patterson and Ida Coffye. She attended school up to the eighth grade in one room at her church, then attended the 33rd Avenue High School in Gulfport, where she was a member of the first graduating class in 1929.

== Career ==
After graduating, she moved to Arkadelphia, Arkansas, to work for the Presbyterian Board of Education. Booth worked for the Board of Education for ten years before moving to Little Rock, Arkansas to attend Philander Smith University on a scholarship. She received a Basic Education Degree in 1940.

When World War II began, Booth moved to Chicago, Illinois, and began working at the Doehler-Jarvis Die Casting Company. She also enrolled in classes at the Illinois Institute of Technology, and graduated with a degree in industrial chemistry. She was the only African-American student in her courses at the institute. While living in Chicago, she met and married Robert Booth, who fought in World War II and died from war injuries eight years later.

Booth went on to work in the Department of Pharmacology at the Chicago Medical School (part of Rosalind Franklin University of Medicine and Science), specializing in preventative health measures, children's health, prenatal care, and treatments for sickle cell anemia. She retired in 1970.

She died August 26, 2006, at the age of 99.

== Activism and legacy ==
Booth was also involved in the civil rights movement and participated in voter registration work in the West Side of Chicago. During the 1960s, she was a member of the Chicago Housing Board's West Side District, and was involved with Operation PUSH (People United to Serve Humanity). In the 1980s, she helped with a registration drive that led to the election of Harold Washington, the first black mayor of Chicago. Booth was also involved with Church Women United, an interdenominational organization.

Booth moved back to Gulfport Mississippi sometime after 1985 to take care of her sister, who had become sick. After returning to Gulfport, she remained civically engaged until her nineties, working to expand the children's activities available at the Magnolia Grove Community Center. Due to her contributions, it was renamed the Katie Patterson Booth Community Center in 2003.

Booth was interviewed by Larry Crowe of The HistoryMakers on November 13, 2002.
