= Julieanna Richardson =

American lawyer and historian (born 1954)

- Born: June 10, 1954 (age 72); Pittsburgh, Pennsylvania, U.S.
- Education: Brandeis University; Harvard Law School
- Occupation: Lawyer
- Known for: Founder of The HistoryMakers

Julieanna L. Richardson (born June 10, 1954) is an American lawyer and the founder and executive director of The HistoryMakers, a nonprofit preserving archival collections of African-American video oral histories.

Before founding The HistoryMakers in 1999, Richardson was a cable television executive and corporate lawyer. She was the founder and CEO of both SCTN Teleproductions, which served as the local production arm for C-SPAN, and Shop Chicago Inc., which set standards for regional TV home-shopping ventures and received international attention with its combination of home shopping and infomercial formats. Richardson resides in Chicago.

== Early life and education ==
Julieanna Richardson was born on June 10, 1954, in Pittsburgh, Pennsylvania, United States, to mother, Margaret Richardson (née Barfield), and father, Julius Richardson. She is the oldest of four sisters. She claims her hometown as Newark, Ohio. She spent her early life in the mill town of Duquesne, Pennsylvania, about 12 miles outside of Pittsburgh, where she lived with her mother and her mother's mother while her father was away serving in the Army. Richardson's father, Julius, had wanted to be a lawyer, but stayed in the military to support his growing family.

Richardson attended Interlochen Arts Academy in Michigan for high school, and in 1976 received her B.A. degree in Theater Arts and American Studies from Brandeis University in Waltham, Massachusetts, where she graduated magna cum laude. During her junior year at Brandeis University, Richardson was a visiting student at the University of East Anglia in Norwich, England. It was also during her studies at Brandeis University that Richardson first experienced the power of oral history, while conducting independent research on the Harlem Renaissance and poet and author Langston Hughes that culminated in her senior honors thesis "It's all i got: Langston Hughes's reconciliation of black and American identities".

In 1980, Richardson received her J.D. degree from Harvard Law School in Cambridge, Massachusetts.

== Career ==
=== Legal career ===
Richardson's first job after graduating from Harvard Law School was with the Chicago law firm of Jenner & Block, where she worked on both corporate and commercial matters with an emphasis on corporate, banking, and copyright law.

=== Television career ===
In the 1982, Richardson served as the City's Assistant and later Chief Cable Administrator for the City of Chicago's Office of Cable Communications, where she established the Chicago Cable Commission, the City's regulatory body.

In 1985, Richardson founded Shop Chicago, a first-of-its-kind regionally based home-shopping channel reaching 750,000 cable households in the Chicago market and featuring local vendors and retail establishments. Shop Chicago set standards for regional TV home-shopping ventures and received international attention with its combination of home shopping and infomercial formats. Other investors in the television home-shopping service included William Bartholomay, vice chairman of Frank B. Hall & Co. and vice chairman of Turner Broadcasting System; Jerold Solovy, a partner at Jenner & Block; and Patricia Koldyke.

Richardson then started her own production company, SCTN Teleproductions, specializing in corporate videos, cable TV programming and new media. For eight years, SCTN managed three local cable channels for TCI, then the nation's largest cable operator. SCTN Teleproductions served as the local production arm for C-SPAN.

=== The HistoryMakers ===
External videos
- "The HistoryMakers 20th Anniversary", December 1, 2020, C-SPAN

In February 2000, she conducted her first interview, with the black radio executive Barry Mayo. Other subjects followed, many of them well known: Harry Belafonte, Ruby Dee, Julian Bond. But an encounter with William Thompson, a veteran of World War II's all-black Tuskegee Airmen, convinced Richardson that the HistoryMakers was about more than just celebrities. When they met, Thompson told Richardson about the Golden 13, the thirteen black men commissioned as officers by the navy during World War II. What is more, he told Richardson that one of those men—William Sylvester White, a former judge with the Illinois appellate court in Chicago—was waiting upstairs. Richardson ended up interviewing both men, who have since died. "It was one of those moments when I knew I was on the right path," says Richardson. "It wasn't about names, but about finding history in places where people didn't know history existed."

Working out of their Chicago office, Richardson and her staff have recorded more than 2,000 interviews (8,000 hours of footage) with both well-known and unsung African Americans, including General Colin Powell, Angela Davis, Julian Bond, Katie Booth, Russell Simmons, Benjamin Carson, Harry Belafonte, Ernie Banks, Gwen Ifill, Maya Angelou, and President Barack Obama when he was an Illinois State Senator. The archive also includes lesser-known African Americans who have been successful in a variety of ways, such as Myrtis Dightman, the first black cowboy to qualify for the Professional Rodeo Association National Finals, Geraldine Johnson, the first African-American woman to be Superintendent of Schools in Connecticut, and Ludie Jones, a tap dancer famous for her performances during the prohibition era. Richardson serves as the Executive Director of The HistoryMakers as well as president of the History Makers National Board of Directors.

As Executive Director, she has also produced public programs and special events, including "An Evening With..." – the HistoryMakers' annual signature PBS-TV Celebrity interview and fundraiser. "An Evening With..." has featured interviews with notable African Americans, including Eartha Kitt, John Rogers, Smokey Robinson, Quincy Jones, Valerie Simpson, Colin Powell, and Andrew Young among others. The annual program is aired on PBS-TV nationwide.

In 2004, the HistoryMakers received a grant from the Institute of Museum and Library Services to create a unique digital archive in collaboration with Carnegie Mellon University. The digital archive, which went live in 2006, includes more than 310 interviews (800 hours of footage) and has 3,500 users from 51 countries.

== Honors ==
Richardson has been the recipient of numerous honors and awards. She sits on the Honors Council of Lawyers for the Creative Arts and she was appointed in 2011 to the Comcast NBCUniversal African American Diversity Council.

In May 2012, she received an Honorary Doctorate of Humanities from Howard University during the school's 144th Commencement Convocation.

== Scholarly works ==
- "From the Slave Narrative to The HistoryMakers", 2010 Oral History Association Annual Meeting, Atlanta, Georgia, October 29, 2010
- "Bridges of Memory (Interviewer Timuel Black)", 2009 Oral History Association Meeting, Louisville, Kentucky, October 15, 2009
- "Digital Showcase: The HistoryMakers and the Development of a Digital Archive Using Carnegie Mellon’s Informedia Digital Video Library", "Convergence of Interests: Oral History in the Digital Age", 2008 Oral History Association Meeting, Pittsburgh, Pennsylvania, October 16, 2008
- "The HistoryMakers: A New Primary Resource for Scholars". Presented by Julieanna L. Richardson, Vernon D. Jarrett Senior Fellow, The Great Cities Institute, University of Illinois at Chicago, Chicago, Illinois, 2007
- "Women Shaping Chicago: Sustaining the Journey", Women's History Month, Chicago Historical Society, Chicago, Illinois, March 27, 2002
