= Glenna Halvorson-Boyd =

American abortion counselor and activist

Glenna Halvorson-Boyd is an American abortion counselor and abortion rights advocate. She has worked in abortion clinics in the Southwestern United States since abortion was legalized nationwide in 1973 with now-overruled court decision Roe v. Wade. From 1984 to 1986, she was president of the National Abortion Federation.

Halvorson-Boyd and her spouse Curtis Wayne Boyd, an abortion provider, have been the target of violence because of their profession: their Dallas clinic was firebombed in 1988, their New Mexico clinic was destroyed in an arson attack in 2007, and in 2014 they were reported to have been monitored by the Federal Bureau of Investigation as they were considered possible targets of domestic terrorism.

== Career ==
Halvorson-Boyd has worked in abortion clinics since the legalization of abortion with Roe v. Wade (1973), working alongside her spouse Curtis Wayne Boyd, a physician and abortion provider of national prominence who helped found the National Abortion Federation, a professional association for the profession. In 1974, she became an abortion counselor at Curtis's clinic in Dallas, Texas, the Fairmount Center, which was later known as Southwestern Women's Surgery Center. The center was the first legal abortion facility in Texas to provide abortion care after the Supreme Court of the United States' ruling in Roe v. Wade. She served as the president of the National Abortion Federation from 1984 to 1986. The Fairmount Clinic was the target of a firebombing attack in 1988, and in a later incident, was broken into by protestors who chained themselves to clinic equipment. By 2000, her work entailed counseling at abortion clinics in Texas and New Mexico and conducting training for counselors and doctors.

The Albuquerque, New Mexico, abortion clinic at which the couple practiced was destroyed by arsonists in 2007, and they struggled to find a new landlord willing to rent to them to rebuild their practice. After the assassination of the Kansas abortion provider George Tiller in 2009, their clinic hired two of his staff members and expanded the scope of their work to work with patients in their third trimester. Their decision to begin providing late-term abortions caught the attention of the anti-abortion organizations such as Operation Rescue. The Guardian reported in 2014 that she and her husband had been monitored by the Federal Bureau of Investigation due to the couple's status as possible targets of domestic terrorism. The Southwestern Women's Surgery Center closed in 2023 due to the Supreme Court's decision in Dobbs v. Jackson Women's Health Organization, which overruled constitutional protections of the right to have an abortion afforded by Roe v. Wade; the couple now practice at its sister clinic, Southwestern Women's Options (SWO), in New Mexico.

== Books and research ==
Halvorson-Boyd has worked in the field of developmental psychology, and according to the SWO website, she holds a PhD in "Human and Organizational Development". An advocate for abortion rights, Halvorson-Boyd and her spouse are "personally and professionally committed to freedom of choice on a local, state, national, and international level", according to SWO.

With Lisa K. Hunter, Halvorson-Boyd authored the book Dancing in Limbo: Making Sense of Life After Cancer (1995) on their experiences with cancer. A reviewer in the journal Family Relations wrote that the book was one of the first that speaks on one's experiences receiving a cancer diagnosis and living as a cancer survivor. According to Richard Freadman in Society, Halvorson-Boyd and Hunter describe the state of remission they live in as a "limbo". A San Francisco Examiner reviewer found the book to be a valuable resource to readers in a similar situation, despite having reservations about the authors' writing style.

With her spouse, Halvorson-Boyd wrote a memoir, We Choose To, published with Disruption Books in 2024. Kirkus Reviews writes that the work is a "well-crafted medical memoir exploring the nuances of abortion in modern American history."

== Personal life ==
Halvorson-Boyd is the daughter of Glenn Halvorson (1913–1995), who was born in South Dakota and lived in Modesto, California, and worked as a television repairman. She completed the licensed practical nurse program at Northern New Mexico Community College in 2004.
