= National Coalition of American Nuns =

American Roman Catholic organization

The National Coalition of American Nuns (NCAN) is an American organization founded in 1969 by Margaret Traxler and Audrey Kopp. The organization is known for its advocacy for women's rights, support for the Equal Rights Amendment, opposition to the Catholic Church hierarchy, including Pope Francis, as well as its positions on abortion, LGBT rights, and women's ordination.

== History ==
NCAN was founded by Margaret Traxler in 1969. In 1963, Margaret Traxler joined a group of priests and sisters marching for civil rights in Selma, Alabama. This led to her involvement with the National Catholic Conference for Interracial Justice, and thus her creation of the NCAN. At the height of their membership in the early 1970s, NCAN had roughly eighteen hundred members.

== Women's ordination ==
The NCAN has long advanced the idea that women should be fully welcomed into the church including the priesthood. In 1972, the organization published a “Declaration of Independence for Women,” a document which outlined a five-year plan to achieve gender equality within and outside the Church. This declaration advocated for full equality for women, reformation of the economic and power systems, and simple living. The Declaration offered the following statement, "We reaffirm Jesus and his gospel as our life focus and that being said, the National Coalition of American Nuns puts society on notice that women refuse to accept any longer the straw for bricks that we are forced to make."

== Political positions ==
The NCAN is partnered with the Women-Church Convergence, which promotes "diverse feminist, faith-filled voices."

=== Support for abortion ===
The NCAN is most well-known for their strong support of reproductive justice, or the right of a woman to choose what is best for her own body, including the use of contraceptives and abortions, if needed. The organization also supports the contraception mandate in the Affordable Care Act.

The NCAN's position on the issues of abortion, LGBT rights, and women's ordination have put it at odds with the U.S. Roman Catholic Bishops and official Church teaching. The NCAN was at odds politically with other Catholic groups when they began challenging the Affordable Care Act by refusing insurance coverage for contraceptives for women. The NCAN believes that this violates the inherent rights and equality given to all men and women of this nation. After the pope declared that priests could forgive women who have had abortions as long as they admitted to sinning, the NCAN realized there was a lot to be done in order to "make women equal members of the Catholic Church." While the NCAN acknowledged the attempts of pope to act in a pastoral manner and soften his stance on the issue, many women within the church did not find these comments satisfactory and felt as though their right to autonomy was still not recognized by the Church. The nuns argued that "sperm from males was responsible for these unplanned pregnancies." Other Catholic feminist groups, such Catholics for Choice, joined the NCAN and spoke out against the pope as well. A member of the NCAN, Sister Donna Quinn, spoke out against the priest after these comments were made, saying that “I think he gets it within the Vatican sense and about the hierarchy, but he still won’t let women have full membership with the Catholic tradition. Women still don’t have full membership.”

== Media coverage ==
NCAN received national attention when Sisters Margaret Traxler, Donna Quinn, Ann Patrick Ware, and Deborah Barrett appeared, in 1982, on the Phil Donahue Show opposing legislation that limited abortion.

== Support for the LGBT community ==
The NCAN is also known for the support for LGBT rights and their acceptance into the Catholic church. Involved in the relationship between the church and the LGBT community for over forty-seven years, Sister Jeannine Gramick reaffirms the NCAN's support of LGBT people because of the presumptions that nuns are strict and repressive, especially in terms of social issues like these. Sister Jeannine Gramick shares that she "wish[es] the image of nuns as compassionate and justice-seeking people would replace the old and idiotic image of nuns that still gets repeated." She even wrote an essay, entitled the National Catholic Reporter's "Global Sister's Report," that draws attention to these social justice issues and their relationship to the nuns of the Catholic Church. Gramick reveals that "Catholic nuns have been LGBT people’s strongest supporters among institutional church people." Sister Gramick and many other members of the NCAN participated in the "Fortnight for Freedom" campaign and protest (see below) during 2012 to try to convince people that our nation's political freedom was under attack. Sister Gramick explains that, "we want our church leaders to be pastoral leaders particularly concerned with the poor and the vulnerable, the gay and lesbian community, women and the equal rights of all people rather than the partisan politics they seem to be playing." However, their stance on these issues has caused controversy among Christian people over the many years that the NCAN has been in place.

== See also ==
- Ann Patrick Ware
- Catholics for Choice
- Equal Rights Amendment
- Leadership Conference of Women Religious
- A Catholic Statement on Pluralism and Abortion
