= National Abortion Federation =

US professional association

The National Abortion Federation (NAF) is a professional association of abortion providers. NAF members include private and non-profit clinics, Planned Parenthood affiliates, women's health centers, physicians' offices, and hospitals who together perform approximately half of the abortions in the U.S. and Canada each year. NAF members also include public hospitals and both public and private clinics in Mexico City and private clinics in Colombia.

NAF was established in 1977 with the merger of the National Association of Abortion Facilities (NAAF), founded by Merle Hoffman, and the National Abortion Council (NAC). One of its founders was Frances Kissling, later president of Catholics for a Free Choice. As of 2024, Brittany Fonteno is president and CEO of the organization.

== Services ==
NAF publishes Clinical Policy Guidelines for Abortion Care (CPGs), which set the standards for abortion procedures. First published in 1996 and revised annually, the CPGs distill a large body of medical knowledge into guidelines developed by consensus, based on rigorous review of relevant literature and known patient outcomes. NAF indicates that "In order to become a member, a clinic must complete a rigorous application process. Member clinics have agreed to comply with our standards for quality and care, updated annually in our Clinical Policy Guidelines. NAF periodically conducts site visits to confirm that our clinics are in compliance with our guidelines."

NAF is funded by donation only and is a registered charity.

=== Canadian programs ===
NAF launched a Canadian Public Policy and Outreach Program on May 16, 2006, with the support of Senator Lucie Pépin, Federal MP and former Minister of State for Health Carolyn Bennett, and NDP Status of Women Critic Irene Mathyssen. The program offers Canadian women abortion referrals, options counseling and post-abortion counseling through the NAF toll-free helpline, and French language website support.

NAF has taken issue with the Canadian Medical Association's (CMA) abortion referral policy which allows physicians to refuse to refer women to abortion providers in accordance with their conscience and CMA Policy - Induced Abortion. If pressed, a physician must indicate alternative sources where a woman might obtain a referral. NAF has lobbied to require Canadian physicians to opt out of provincial healthcare plans entirely if they do not refer for abortion.

The National Abortion Federation of Canada provides a detailed list of abortion clinics by province and the maximum gestational period that the clinic will provide abortion up to. The website also has other resources, including information on referrals and how to obtain financial support for travel expenses, after-treatment supplies, child care and various other needs.

== History ==
=== Establishment ===
NAF was established in 1977 with the merger of the National Association of Abortion Facilities (NAAF), founded by Merle Hoffman, and the National Abortion Council (NAC). One of its founders was Frances Kissling, later president of Catholics for a Free Choice.

=== 1980s and 1990s ===
NAF's headquarters in Washington, D.C., were bombed in 1984. An explosive device attached to a propane tank outside of the building failed to explode, but detonated the propane tank, severely damaging the building.

NAF filed a lawsuit against the Metropolitan Atlanta Rapid Transit Authority (MARTA) in 1999 for refusing to place NAF advertisements in MARTA buses. The public transit system had previously allowed advertisements from a church-funded organization which called for people to have adoptions over abortions.

=== 2000s ===
In 2015, the organization sued the Center for Medical Progress (CMP), an anti-abortion organization, for making secret recordings that CMP alleged depicted abortion providers engaging in criminal activity. Orrick subsequently issued a temporary restraining order blocking the CMP from releasing the videos. The CMP had earlier released heavily edited videos, which purported to show that Planned Parenthood had been inappropriately selling fetal tissue. In his decision granting a restraining order, Orrick wrote that the order was necessary to prevent irreparable harm to NAF "in the form of harassment, intimidation, violence, invasion of privacy, and injury to reputation, and the requested relief is in the public interest." In subsequent proceedings, Orrick reviewed hundreds of hours of videos and found no evidence of wrongdoing on NAF's behalf, and concluded that the CMP, led by anti-abortion activist David Daleiden, had "misleadingly edited videos to make it appear as though abortion providers were breaking the law." In 2016, Orrick issued a preliminary injunction against CMP blocking the release of their videos; after Daleiden violated the injunction, Orrick found Daleiden and his two attorneys in civil contempt and fined them $195,000. The contempt finding was upheld on appeal. Orrick awarded NAF $6.3 million in legal fees in 2021 after he refused to dismiss the lawsuit; he awarded NAF an additional $700,000 in legal fees in 2024.

== Leadership ==
Physician Phillip G. Stubblefield was one of the NAF's early presidents. Abortion counselor Glenna Halvorson-Boyd served as NAF's president from 1984 to 1986. Former union leader Vicki Saporta served in the position from 1995 to 2019; she announced her retirement in 2018 after being accused of not taking action when an employee was guilty of sexual harassment.

Katherine Hancock Ragsdale, an Episcopal priest, was interim president and CEO from September 2018 to October 2021. The position remained unfilled until Brittany Fonteno was named president and CEO in 2023.
