= Vicki Saporta =

American trade unionist

Vicki A. Saporta was the president of the National Abortion Federation from 1995 to 2019. In 2013, she received the Roger Baldwin Medal of Liberty from the ACLU.

== Biography ==
Saporta was born and raised in Rochester, New York, and graduated from Cornell University in 1974. She went on to study at the London School of Economics, and later served as director of organizing for the International Brotherhood of Teamsters beginning in 1983. For over 20 years, Vicki was the president of the National Abortion Federation until she resigned after being accused of not taking action when an employee was guilty of sexual harassment.
