= Joseph O'Rourke (activist) =

American priest and activist (1938–2008)

Joseph F. O'Rourke (May 15, 1938 – July 24, 2008) was a laicized Catholic priest and American pro-choice activist.

== Biography ==
Joseph F. "Joe" O'Rourke was born in 1938, two days after the death of his father, in Hudson, New York. He joined the Jesuit Order of the Roman Catholic Church in 1958, and was ordained to the priesthood around 1971.

O'Rourke was an activist against the Vietnam war and was one of nine people who broke into Dow Chemical offices in Washington, D.C. in 1969 and destroyed some of the company's files. Dow Chemical was the primary manufacturer of napalm. During this period O'Rourke worked closely with Philip Berrigan.

O'Rourke was one of the early board members of Catholics for a Free Choice. In August 1974, CFFC President Joan Harriman asked him to travel with her to Marlboro, Massachusetts, to baptize a baby whose local priests refused to perform the rite. The baby's mother, 20-year-old Carol Morreale, had been interviewed regarding an "abortion-information clinic" that was proposed for Marlboro by Bill Baird, an activist from New York City. Morreale told a newspaper reporter that she did not advocate abortion herself but that she was in favor of free choice for others and thus she supported Baird's proposal. Because of her statement in the newspaper, and the town's polarization over the issue of abortion clinics, Morreale's local priest would not baptize her three-month-old son Nathaniel, and Humberto Sousa Medeiros, the Archbishop of Boston, said that he would not allow any other priest to perform the rite. O'Rourke and Harriman spoke with local priests but could not convince them to lift the stated baptism ban. On August 20, 1974, O'Rourke publicly baptized the baby on the steps of the parish church, Immaculate Conception Church, in front of its locked doors and 300 onlookers including Morreale family members and friends, and news reporters. In this, he acted against his superiors' express orders, and was dismissed from the Jesuit Order in September. O'Rourke continued to live with his order and appealed his dismissal to Rome on the grounds that he had a right to baptize the baby. His appeal was rejected. Later, he was also laicized.

Although O'Rourke was very critical of Catholic Church teaching in matters of sexuality, he remained committed to Catholic advocacy of religious liberty, and for constitutional, economic, political and human rights.

O'Rourke later married and had a child. He died in Oak Park, Illinois, in 2008.
