= Ecumenical Task Force on Women and Religion =

The National Organization for Women's Ecumenical Task Force on Women and Religion was created by feminist theologian Elizabeth Farians. The group played an important role in the creation of a Catholic feminist movement in the 1960s and early 1970s and worked for the ratification of the Equal Rights Amendment.

== Creation of the task force ==
The National Organization for Women was created in 1966, the same year the Ecumenical Task Force on Women and Religion was founded. It was founded by notable Catholic feminist, Dr. Elizabeth Farians. Regarding women in the church, Farians was famous for saying, "It's all right if they come with a cake with their hands, but if they come with an idea in their heads." In the late 1970s, Georgia Fuller served as the head of the task force.

In the early years of NOW, the role of religion was emphasized as many activists identified as faith based feminists. Scholars such as Karen Bojar have emphasized the religion was foundational to the founding of NOW since it was so important to Americans in general. The task force consisted not only of Catholics, but Protestants and Jewish women as well.

== Support for the Equal Rights Amendment ==
Many of the members of the task force, including Farians, supported the Equal Rights Amendment.

== Political history of the task force ==
The organization lasted from 1966 to the 1970s. Many local chapters were created including one in Detroit in 1970 and another in Pensacola, Florida.

The archives of the task force are housed as the Schlesinger Library at Harvard College.

== Support for women deacons ==
Increasing leadership opportunities for women in religious communities was an important goal for the task force. The group endorsed the right for women to serve as deacons in 1971. This decision came as a result of the recommendation of 11 theologians.

== Easter bonnet protest ==
One of the most well documented actions of the task force was 1969 protest against a church requirement that women wear hats during service. During what Elizabeth Farians referred to as the "national unveiling", women took off their head coverings at a church in Milwaukee, Wisconsin.

== Members ==
- Sister Elizabeth Candon
- Valerie Elliott
- Elizabeth Farians
- Georgia Fuller
- Nancy Lee Head
- Ruth Hoppin
- Joyce Slayton Mitchell
