= Elizabeth Jane Via =

American lawyer

Elizabeth Jane Via, IHM, is a California lawyer who was born in St. Louis, MO in 1947. As of November 2019, over one hundred and forty women have been ordained in the Roman Catholic Womenpriests (RCWP) movement worldwide. RCWP is not sanctioned by the Roman Catholic Church, which considers ordination of women a violation of its canon law 1024 and invalid.

She was ordained in 2004 as a Deacon in the RCWP on the Danube River, then as a womanpriest in 2006 aboard a boat in international waters between Austria, Germany and Switzerland. She began her own faith community in 2005 and co-founded with Rod Stephens which is called the Mary Magdalene the Apostle Catholic Community. In 2017, she was elected one of two Bishops in the Western Region of the RCWP. She is a member of the Immaculate Heart Community (IHM) in Southern California.

In 1984 she was one of 97 theologians and religious persons who signed A Catholic Statement on Pluralism and Abortion, calling for religious pluralism and discussion within the Catholic Church regarding the Church's position on abortion. She reported losing speaking engagements because of the controversy following the published statement.

Via co-founded the Mary Magdalene Apostle Catholic Community in November 2005. She speaks at meetings and conferences concerning women's ordination and inclusive ministry. Via has attempted to speak on the topic of women in the priesthood at organizations affiliated with the official Roman Catholic Church, but her invitations to speak have sometimes been revoked.

Via is also an attorney with the San Diego District Attorney's office. In 1991 she was one of the county's attorneys in the case of Alicia Wade.
