= Charlotte Clymer =

American activist (born 1986)

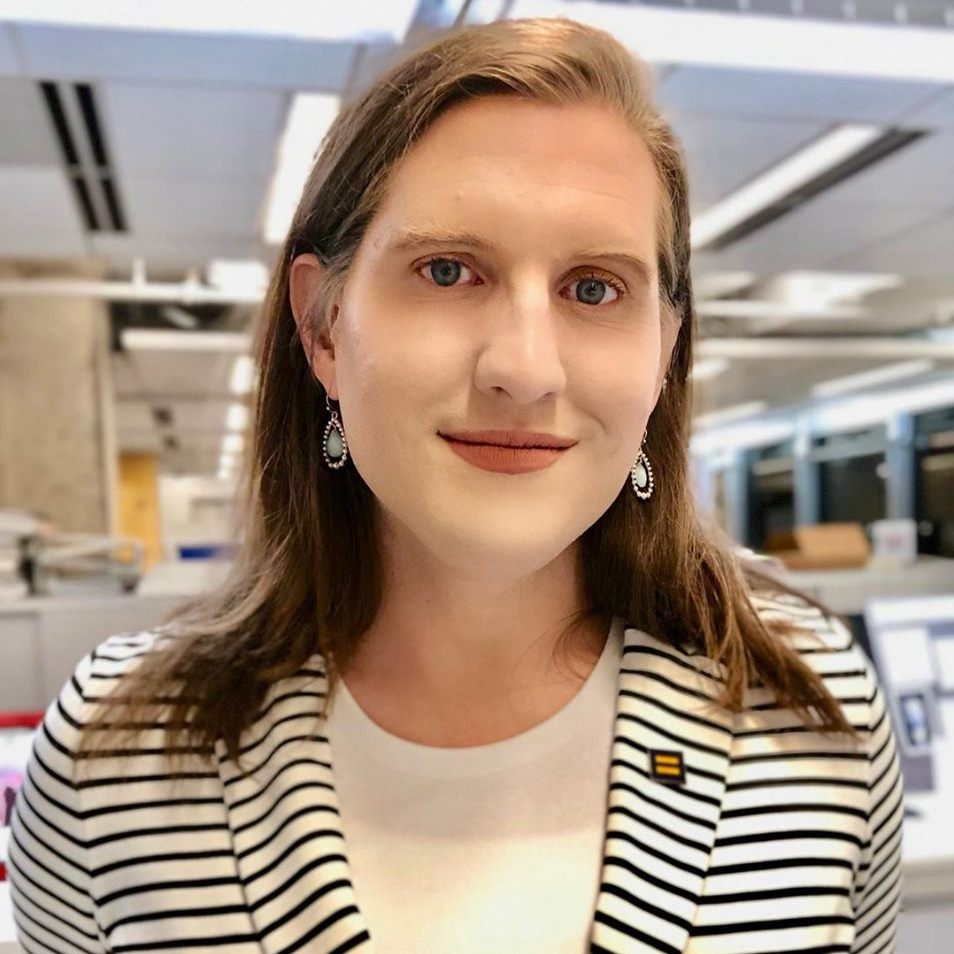
- Born: October 11, 1986 (age 40)
- Education: Georgetown University (BA)
- Occupations: Activist, writer
- Military career
- Allegiance: United States of America
- Branch: United States Army
- Service years: 2005–2012
- Rank: Corporal
- Unit: 3rd U.S. Infantry Regiment (The Old Guard)

Charlotte Anora Elizabeth Clymer (born October 11, 1986) is an American activist, press secretary, and writer. She was previously the press secretary for rapid response at the Human Rights Campaign and the director of communications and strategy at Catholics for Choice.

== Career ==
Clymer joined the United States Army in 2005, and later enrolled in the United States Military Academy. Clymer was assigned to the 3rd U.S. Infantry Regiment (The Old Guard), based at Arlington National Cemetery, until 2012. After leaving the Army, she moved to Washington, D.C. and took a job as a visitor services representative at the United States Holocaust Memorial Museum. After working there for a year, Clymer enrolled at Georgetown University and finished her bachelor's degree.

In 2017, Clymer began working at the Human Rights Campaign, the largest LGBTQ advocacy group and political lobbying organization in the United States. In 2020, Clymer was included in Fortune magazine's 40 Under 40 list in the "Government and Politics" category. From January through May 2021, Clymer was the director of communications and strategy for Catholics for Choice, an abortion rights dissenting Catholic advocacy group based in Washington, D.C.

Clymer is an outspoken activist on issues including LGBTQ rights, feminism, and veterans' affairs.

As of October 2024, Clymer is the spokesperson for progressive organization AllVote, which has distributed false or misleading election-related information on multiple occasions and has been flagged as a scam by state officials across the country.

== Personal life ==
Clymer was raised in central Texas, after moving with her mother from Utah at a young age. In November 2017, she came out as a transgender woman. Clymer is an Episcopalian.
