= Journal of Religion and Film =

The Journal of Religion and Film
- Discipline: Religious studies, film studies
- Language: English
- Edited by: John C. Lyden

Publication details
- History: 1997-present
- Publisher: University of Nebraska at Omaha (United States)
- Frequency: Biannual

Standard abbreviations
- ISO 4: J. Relig. Film

Indexing
- ISSN: 1092-1311
- LCCN: sn96003557
- OCLC no.: 36114759

Links
- Journal homepage

The Journal of Religion and Film is a biannual peer-reviewed academic journal that "examines the description, critique, and embodiment of religion in film". The editor-in-chief is John C. Lyden (Grand View University). It was established in 1997 by William L. Blizek and Ronald Burke (University of Nebraska at Omaha), who became interested in the subject of religion and film after hearing Andrew Greeley speak about images of God in popular movies. It is a searchable site that deals with both commentary on movies, such as the relationship between Star Wars and The Matrix, as well as philosophical issues, especially regarding the Christian faith.
