= Anne Carr =

Sister Anne Carr (11 November 1934 – 11 February 2008) was a Catholic nun, a Sister of Charity of the Blessed Virgin Mary, an activist, and feminist theologian at the University of Chicago Divinity School, where she was the first female tenured member of the faculty. She was well known for her beliefs regarding feminism and seen as an advocate for women's rights. Carr specialized in feminism theology regarding Catholic thought and during her lifetime she wrote ground-breaking books which examined feminism and Christianity. She has been described as a founding mother of academic Catholic feminism.

== Education and career ==
Carr grew up in the Gresham area of Chicago. She earned her bachelor's degree from Mundelein College and then taught kindergarten and entered the Sisters of Charity of the Blessed Virgin Mary in 1958. She then taught at Mundelein College while earning master's degrees in theology from Marquette University and University of Chicago. She also received her doctorate from the University of Chicago Divinity School in 1971 with a dissertation on the German theologian Karl Rahner. She was then appointed chair of the religious studies department at Mundelein College and taught there and at Indiana University until she began teaching at the University of Chicago Divinity School in 1975. She also held several honorary doctorates. Her books include Thomas Merton's Theology of Self and Transforming Grace: Christian Tradition and Women's Experience. She also regularly published articles in academic journals and served as associate editor for the journal Horizons and co-editor of The Journal of Religion. She retired from University of Chicago in 2003.

== Beliefs ==
Carr's opinions on the church were considered controversial, especially as she critiqued the modern shortcomings of the Church while still remaining a devoted nun to Catholicism. During her life as a practicing Catholic woman, Anne Carr contributed multiple literature pieces regarding feminist theology that dealt with links between traditional Catholic values and feminism. What many believed was a radical approach at the time, Carr did not hold back when she discussed the sexism that existed in the Christian community.

She was amongst a group of twenty some nuns in the United States who were part of an extremely provocative New York Times advertisement that asserted that Roman Catholics held "a diversity of opinions regarding abortion." Anne Carr was also an advocate for the ordination of women in the Catholic Church. She repeatedly called upon religious men and women to understand it is possible to remain devoted to the Church while simultaneously understanding traditions can, and sometimes need to, be reevaluated.

== Awards and recognition ==
In 1997, the Catholic Theological Society of America (CSTA) bestowed the John Courtney Murray Award on Carr.

In 2007, the CSTA gave her the Ann O'Hara Graff Memorial Award, given for "woman-defined scholarship, and liberating action on behalf of women in the church and/or the broader community."

== Bibliography ==
- Thomas Merton's Theology of Self
- Transforming Grace: Christian Tradition and Women's Experience
- Is a Christian Feminist Theology Possible?
