= Ethna =

Ethna is a feminine Irish given name.

Notable people with the name include:

- Ethna Byrne-Costigan (1904–1991), Irish academic and writer
- Ethna Carbery (1864–1902), Irish journalist, writer and poet
- Ethna Gaffney (1920–2011), Irish professor and scientist
- Ethna MacCarthy (1903–1959), Irish poet and paediatrician
- Ethna Rouse (born 1937), former New Zealand cricketer
- Ethna Beulah Winston (1903–1993), American educator
