= Mary Luke Tobin =

Sister Mary Luke Tobin SL
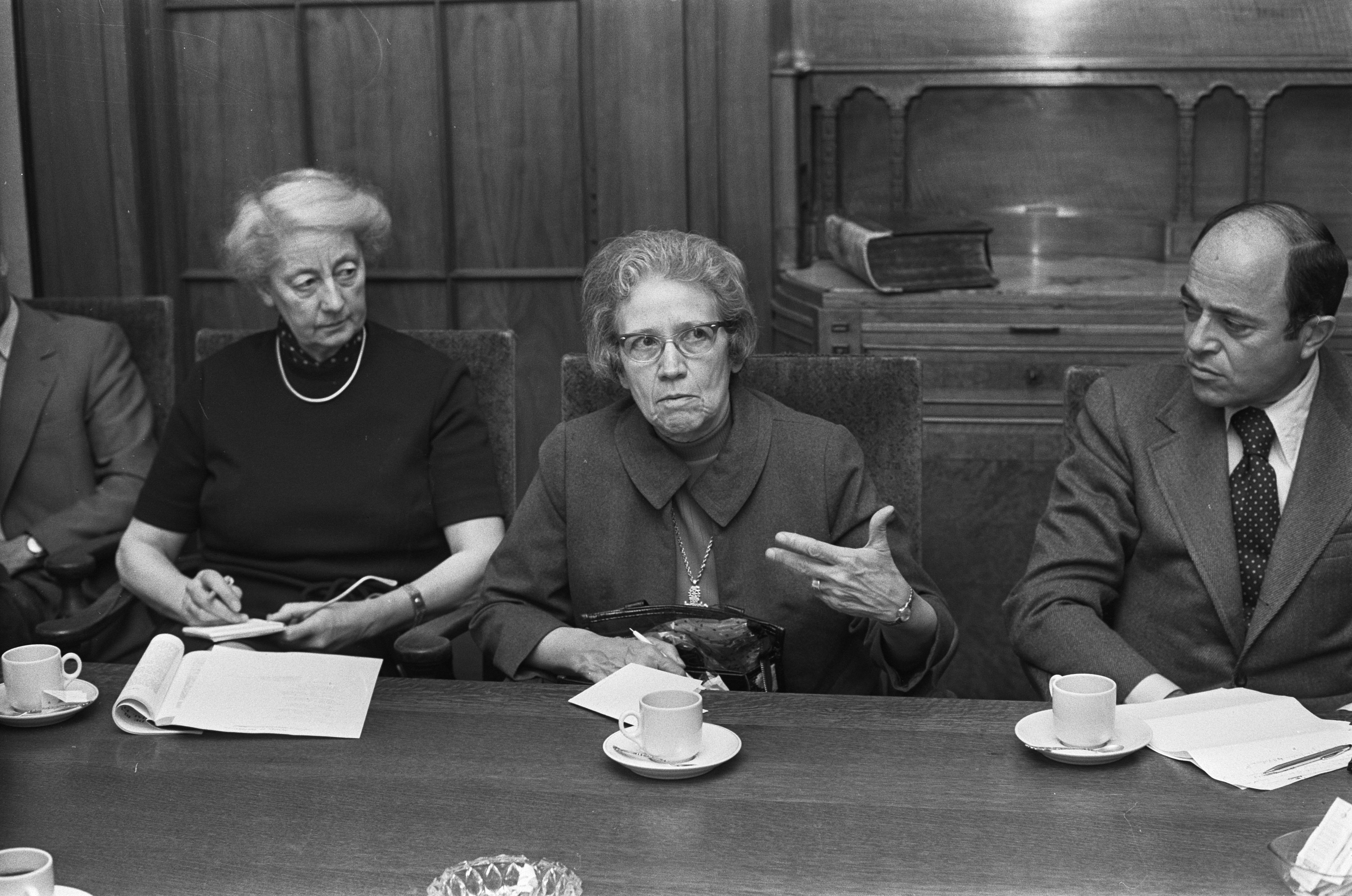
- Tobin in the Netherlands in 1973
- Born: Ruth Marie Tobin; May 16, 1908
- Died: August 24, 2006 (aged 98)

Sister Mary Luke Tobin SL (May 16, 1908 – August 24, 2006) was an American Roman Catholic religious sister, and one of only 15 women auditors invited to the Second Vatican Council, and the only American woman of the three women religious permitted to participate on the Council's planning commissions. She was inducted into the Colorado Women's Hall of Fame in 1997.

== Early life ==
Christened as Ruth Marie Tobin, she attended public schools in Denver and traveled to Nevada and California with her parents and older brother. She managed a dance school while attending Loretto Heights College in Denver.

== Religious background ==
Sister Tobin was a former Superior General of the Sisters of Loretto. She had been president of the congregation from 1958 to 1970. When she was invited to Rome, she was President of the Leadership Conference of Women Religious. She did much of her work in her native Denver but traveled the world on missions for peace, including visits to Saigon, Paris, El Salvador and Northern Ireland.

== Thomas Merton ==
While living at the Loretto Motherhouse in Nerinx, Kentucky, she became friends with Trappist monk Thomas Merton. Merton shared with her some of the works he was not allowed to publish. After Merton's death in 1968 she co-founded the International Thomas Merton Society and also established the Thomas Merton Center for Creative Exchange in Denver in 1979 where Merton's spirituality and writings came to be known by many. She gave Merton retreats and co-founded a Buddhist-Christian dialogue/meditation group in Denver. Tobin invited such theological luminaries as Fr. Edward Schillebeeckx, O.P., and Fr. Bernard Häring, C.Ss.R., to lecture at Loretto. She was an actress in the TV special: Merton: A Film Biography of Thomas Merton.

== Political activism ==
The diminutive Sister supported women's ordination to the priesthood, opposed nuclear proliferation, supported the United Farm Workers and took on the Blue Diamond Coal Company by using Loretto's shares to challenge the firm's practices and took part in nonviolent actions at Rocky Flats Nuclear Weapons Plant, the U.S. Air Force Academy and Martin-Marietta in Colorado.

In the 1970s, Sister Tobin was an outspoken supporter of the Equal Rights Amendment (ERA). She was quoted as saying, "...it would help provide equal pay for ever larger numbers of women who are heads of families." She spent time rooming with another feminist nun, Sr. Ann Patrick Ware.

== Death ==
She died, aged 98, in 2006 from natural causes in Denver, Colorado.
