= Margaret Traxler =

American Religious Sister and feminist

Margaret Traxler SSND

Personal life
- Born: March 11, 1924 Henderson, Minnesota, United States
- Died: February 12, 2002 (aged 77) Mankato, Minnesota, United States
- Notable work(s): Education and activism for women's rights and the poor
- Education: College of St. Catherine (B.A., Notre Dame University (M.A.

Religious life
- Religion: Roman Catholic
- Order: School Sisters of Notre Dame
- Monastic name: Sister Mary Peter, S.S.N.D.
- Profession: 1947

Senior posting
- Previous post: National Catholic Conference for Interracial Justice, Director of Educational Services; National Coalition of American Nuns, co-founder; Citizen's Task Force of Inquiry regarding Civil Liberties in Belfast, Northern Ireland, organizer; Institute for Women Today, founder

Margaret Ellen Traxler, SSND (March 11, 1924 – February 12, 2002) was an American member of the School Sisters of Notre Dame and a prominent women's rights activist. She was also a leader in developing institutions to help poor women in the city of Chicago.

== Biography ==
=== Early life ===
Traxler was born in 1924 in Henderson, Minnesota, the daughter of a country doctor and a nurse. The fourth of five girls in the family, she was affectionately known as Peggy and was a lively girl who enjoyed the debate team at school and played the trumpet in the school band.

Traxler entered the novitiate of the School Sisters of Notre Dame in 1942, after completing high school, and the following year was given the habit of the School Sisters and the religious name of Sister Mary Peter, the name she used for some 20 years. She earned a Bachelor's degree in English from the College of St. Catherine in Saint Paul, Minnesota, and later received a Master's degree from Notre Dame University in Indiana. For the next 17 years she taught in high schools and colleges of her religious congregation in Minnesota and North Dakota.

=== Social Activism ===
At that point, Traxler, who had returned to using her baptismal name, began devoting herself to advocacy on behalf of interracial justice and the rights of women in society and in the Catholic Church, She took part in the Selma to Montgomery marches in 1965, singing "We Shall Overcome". Just prior to Selma, she joined the staff of the National Catholic Conference for Interracial Justice, based in Chicago, serving successively as Assistant Director and Director of its Department of Educational Services (1965–1971) and as Executive Director (1971–1973). During this period, she and 12 other nuns marched in the front row of Martin Luther King Jr.'s Selma to Montgomery marches, and she also worked with King to organize "traveling workshops" of Sister-scholars to assist schools preparing for integration, and establish a program to place Religious Sisters in African-American colleges to allow the regular faculty to pursue advanced degrees.

In 1977, Traxler became an associate of the Women's Institute for Freedom of the Press (WIFP). WIFP is an American nonprofit publishing organization. The organization works to increase communication between women and connect the public with forms of women-based media.

Other notable activities included attending the peace negotiations in Paris, France, for ending the Vietnam War, organizing the NCCIJ's Citizen's Task Force of Inquiry regarding Civil Liberties in Belfast, Northern Ireland, and co-founding the National Coalition of American Nuns and the National Interreligious Task Force on Soviet Jewry, for which she received an award from the Prime Minister of Israel, Golda Meir.

=== Women's rights ===
Traxler was a prominent supporter of the Equal Rights Amendment with her lobbying group, National Coalition of American Nuns. She testified in front of a Senate Judiciary Committee in favor of the ERA (1970) and in front of 23 state legislatures. In 1984 Traxler was one of 26 Religious Sisters who signed their names to an advertisement in The New York Times entitled "A Catholic Statement on Pluralism and Abortion". The ad stated that there was more than one Catholic position on abortion, and called for religious pluralism and discussion within the Church. The ad showed the results of a poll of American Catholics: 11% were against abortion in any form. The ad said that this demonstrated that a great majority of Catholics were sympathetic to at least some instances of abortion. Traxler upheld the church's teaching opposing abortion, but believed each woman had a right to make the choice for herself. Although 96 other religious leaders, both priests and laymen, also signed the ad, it was the members of religious congregations who drew the Vatican's wrath and who had to retract their statement or risk expulsion from their congregations.

The four-year ordeal that ensued saw two Sisters leave religious life, and heralded the start of Traxler's heart troubles. Traxler defended the poll findings by appearing on television with a tube of toothpaste, saying that the toothpaste cannot be put back in the tube; an analogy to the Church's inability to hide the fact that the majority of American Catholics disagreed with its doctrinal position. "The tension that comes with Rome on your back is enormous," said Sister Betty Barrett, who added that Traxler suffered greatly when Rome forbade her friend of 30 years, Sister Jeannine Gramick (also a School Sister of Notre Dame at the time), to continue her pastoral ministry with gays and lesbians. Gramick called Traxler "a giant of a woman, a prophetess to us all, unafraid to speak truth to power."

== Institute for Women Today ==
Traxler was also the founder of the Institute for Women Today, a Christian–Jewish–Protestant coalition to reach out to troubled women. Under the aegis of the IWT, she organized skilled workers and lawyers to travel to women's prisons in Illinois to provide training and advice. And she visited these prisons regularly, bringing the women sewing machines to make clothes for their children. She opened Sister House on Chicago's west side to aid women coming out of prison. She established Maria Shelter for abused women and children and Casa Notre Dame for older homeless women. And she funded these projects by speaking regularly, and without embarrassment, at churches and synagogues.

=== Death ===
Traxler suffered a debilitating stroke in 2000 that ended her public work, and retired to the infirmary at the Provincial Motherhouse of the School Sisters of Notre Dame in Mankato, Minnesota. She died two years later and was buried in the Sisters' cemetery there.

== See also ==
- Donna Quinn
- Marjorie Tuite
- Marquette University
- Marquette University Special Collections and University Archives
- National Coalition of American Nuns
- School Sisters of Notre Dame
