= Ethne Kennedy =

Ethne Kennedy (November 13, 1921 – March 13, 2005) was an American religious worker and activist.

Kennedy was the daughter of parents who had emigrated to the United States from Ireland early in the twentieth century; among her siblings was the literary scholar Sighle Kennedy. A member of the Society of Helpers, she was the founding president of the National Assembly of Religious Women, and after the Second Vatican Council worked to ensure that women could participate fully in the workings of the Roman Catholic Church. She also was editor of Probe, the newsletter put out by the organization of sisters' councils in the United States. As part of her role with the National Assembly of Religious Women, she ensured that sisters had the ability to cooperate with the church in its decision making and process implementation at the national, regional, and local levels, and assisted them in integrating these decisions into society. The organization also promoted a new identity for Catholic religious sisters. Later in life Kennedy worked among AIDS patients in New York City; at the United Nations, she participated in demonstrations and protests against war. She was also among the founders of AIDS Ministries/AIDS Assist. During her career she wrote on the subject of women's role in ministry.
