= ReNews =

Hong Kong news website

- Type: Online-only news
- Founder: Lam Yin-pong
- Founded: 19 April 2022
- Political alignment: Pro-democracy
- Language: Chinese

ReNews is a Hong Kong online news outlet established in 2022. Operated solely, the outlet was founded in response to the consecutive shutdowns of Hong Kong pro-democratic media outlets and primarily covers non-mainstream political news.

== History ==
Founder and sole operator Lam Yin-pong has worked as a journalist for Hong Kong Cable Television, Hong Kong Economic Times, TVB, and Stand News for sixteen years. After the closure of pro-democratic media outlets such as Apple Daily, Citizen News, and his former employer Stand News, Lam decided to found ReNews to provide an alternative news source. The news outlet was established on 19 April 2022. He chose to operate the outlet alone to avoid implicating others in potential investigations. The outlet was named "ReNews", signifying a repackaging and reinterpretation of significant but overlooked news from mainstream media. It releases three to four reports per day, all authored and photographed by Lam, with 70% focused on daily news and 30% consisting of opinion pieces and interviews, covering topics that he believes mainstream media may overlook or avoid.

The outlet is completely free to read, relying entirely on reader subscriptions via Patreon for its funding. Within ten days of its establishment, ReNews attracted over 25,000 followers. By December 2023, it had grown to over 110,000 followers on Instagram and more than 100,000 followers on Facebook. The outlet was known for launching a series of interviews with political prisoners. In May 2025, the Hong Kong Journalists Association stated that ReNews, alongside seven other local media outlets, their employees and their family members, has been subject to a tax audit by the Inland Revenue Department.
