= Mary Kay Blakely =

American feminist journalist

Mary Kay Blakely (February 18, 1948 – June 3, 2023) was an American writer, feminist, and professor notable for her contributions to Ms. Magazine, The New York Times, and Vogue, among many publications, and for her work as a full-time professor at the Missouri School of Journalism.

== Early life and education ==
Mary Kay Blakely was born on February 18, 1948 to a conservative Catholic family of five in an Irish neighborhood of Chicago. She had two older brothers, Frank and Paul, and two younger siblings, Frank and Regina. Blakely attended an all-girls' Catholic high school, where she joined the school paper and first developed her interest in writing.

After marrying her first husband, Howard Koepp, in 1970, Blakely moved to Fort Wayne, Indiana, where she earned her bachelor's and master's degrees from Northern Illinois University.

== Career ==
While living in Fort Wayne, Blakely gave a speech on her experience as a new mother. After hearing Blakely speak, the editor of the Fort Wayne Journal Gazette invited Blakely to be a weekly columnist. The editor of the Gazette encouraged Blakely, after five years on the Gazette, to send her columns to The New York Times, where she became a "Hers" columnist for the paper. While in Fort Wayne, Blakely taught Women's Studies at Indiana University.

In 1997, Blakely accepted a full-time professorship at the Missouri School of Journalism, which she held until her retirement. While at Missouri, she worked to create a partnership between Missouri's Journalism School and the New School University of New York, which allowed students the opportunity to gain experience studying and working in Manhattan. She met her second husband, Steven Jorgensen, the dean emeritus of the College of Human Environmental Sciences, while at Missouri. Blakely received the William T. Kemper Fellowship from the University of Missouri. She also received the Exceptional Merit Media Award and the Sigma Delta Chi Award from the Society of Professional Journalists.

== Journalism and other works ==
Blakely wrote for a variety of publications, including as a "Hers" columnist for The New York Times, where she challenged anti-feminist rhetoric; and an "Personal Words" columnist in the Gloria Steinem-founded Ms. Magazine. Her essays appeared in The Washington Post, New York Times Book Review, Life, Psychology Today, Los Angeles Times Magazine, Self, Family Circle, Working Woman, Woman’s Day, Mirabella, Lear’s, Mother Jones, Utne Reader and other publications.

A regular writer for the Los Angeles Times, Blakely published the article "Psyched Out" in the Los Angeles Times' Sunday magazine in 1993. Blakely's article, which explored the gravity of "political depression" and took aim at anti-feminist, outdated rhetoric. The article drew an onslaught of responses from the Times' readers that allegedly "broke the newsroom's fax machine."

Blakely is also the author of several books, including Red, White, and Oh So Blue: A Memoir of Political Depression, American Mom: Motherhood, Politics, and Humble Pie, and Wake Me When It's Over.

The body of Blakely's published work has been licensed by Hallmark Inc. to excerpt for cards in its “American Voices” series.

== Death ==
Mary Kay Blakely died June 3, 2023, in Columbia, Missouri.
