= Catholics for Choice =

Abortion rights advocacy group

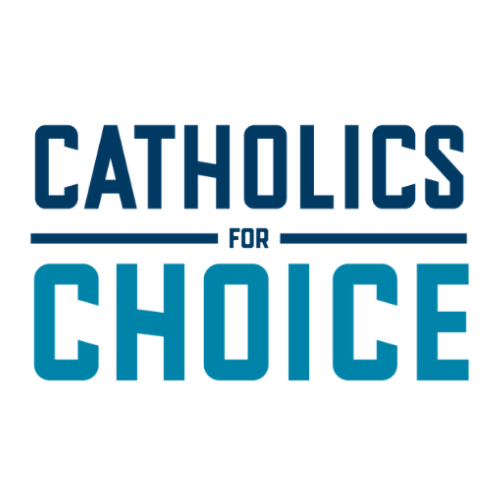
- Abbreviation: CFC
- Formation: 1973
- Headquarters: Washington, D.C.
- Co-President of Executive Administration: Christopher Wimbush
- Co-President of Programs and Development: Caitlin Borgmann
- Website: catholicsforchoice.org

Catholics for Choice (CFC) is a non-profit organization based in Washington, D.C. that advocates for the legalization of abortion, in dissent with the teachings of the Catholic Church. CFC is not affiliated with the Catholic Church. Formed in 1973 as Catholics for a Free Choice, the group gained notice after its 1984 advertisement in The New York Times challenging Church teachings on abortion led to Church disciplinary pressure against some of the priests and nuns who signed it. It has lobbied nationally and internationally for abortion rights goals and led an unsuccessful effort to downgrade the Holy See's status in the United Nations. CFC was led for 25 years by Frances Kissling and is currently led by its Interim President Christopher Wimbush.

A number of Catholic bishops and conferences of bishops have unequivocally rejected and publicly denounced CFC's identification as a Catholic organization, on the grounds that it does not accept of Catholicism’s teachings on abortion. For example, the United States Conference of Catholic Bishops (USCCB) and the Canadian Conference of Catholic Bishops, have stated that CFC is not a Catholic organization and that it promotes positions contrary to Catholic teaching.

== History ==
CFC was founded in 1973 by Catholics Joan Harriman, Patricia Fogarty McQuillan, and Meta Mulcahy as Catholics for a Free Choice (CFFC), with the aim of promoting access to abortion in the context of Catholic tradition. It emerged from Catholics for the Elimination of All Restrictive Abortion & Contraceptive Laws, a New York lobby group that had been formed in 1970.

=== 1970s ===
An early member of the board of directors was Joseph O'Rourke, then a Jesuit priest. In August 1974, President Harriman asked O'Rourke to travel with her to Marlborough, Massachusetts, to baptize a baby whose local priests refused to perform the rite – Catholic canon law forbids priests from baptizing an infant, if they are not assured that at least one of the parents will raise the infant with the Catholic faith. The baby's mother, 20-year-old Carol Morreale, had been interviewed regarding an abortion clinic that was proposed for Marlboro by Bill Baird, an activist from New York City. Morreale told a newspaper reporter that she did not advocate abortion herself but that she was in favor of "free choice" for others and thus she supported Baird's proposal. Because of her statement in the newspaper, and the town's polarization over the banning of abortion clinics, Morreale's local priest would not baptize her three-month-old son Nathaniel, and Humberto Sousa Medeiros, the Archbishop of Boston, said that he would not allow any other priest to perform the rite. On August 20, 1974, O'Rourke publicly baptized the baby on the steps of the Marlborough church, in front of its locked doors and 300 spectators. O'Rourke acted against his superiors' express orders. This was preceded "by a long trail of discontent, often testing the authority of the church", according to The New York Times News Service. O'Rourke was dismissed from the Jesuit Order in September. He served for a time as CFFC board president.

=== 1980s ===
In 1978, Frances Kissling joined CFFC. Kissling had operated an abortion clinic and was a founder and director of the National Abortion Federation. In 1980, she became a member of CFFC's board of directors and in 1982 was made president, which position she held until her retirement in February 2007. Kissling lobbied politicians and activists, many Catholic, to work in favor of giving women access to contraception and abortion and pushed the CFFC to lead more political campaigns.

In 1979, Patricia McMahon became CFFC president and shifted CFFC's legal status from a lobby to an educational association, opening up the group to tax-exempt status and to foundation support. One result of this was a $75,000 grant on behalf of the pro-abortion rights Sunnen Foundation, which funded the group's first publications, the Abortion in Good Faith series.

=== The New York Times ad ===
In 1982, CFC sponsored a briefing of Catholic members of Congress, highlighting that the majority of American Catholics disagreed with the Catholic Church's position on the topic of abortion. Congresswoman Geraldine Ferraro wrote an introduction to the briefing, and endorsements were also received from Congressmen Tom Daschle and Leon Panetta. Ferraro wrote that responses varied to the problem of abortion, and that "the Catholic position on abortion is not monolithic...."

During the 1984 presidential campaign, Ferraro was chosen as the vice-presidential running mate of Walter Mondale. Cardinal John Joseph O'Connor, Archbishop of New York, sharply criticized Ferraro's pro-abortion rights position, and in October 1984 Kissling responded to O'Connor by placing an advertisement signed by 97 Catholics, including theologians, lay persons, priests and nuns, in The New York Times. The advertisement, "A Catholic Statement on Pluralism and Abortion," stated that "direct abortion ... can sometimes be a moral choice" and that "responsible moral decisions can only be made in an atmosphere of freedom from fear of coercion."

The Catholic Church took disciplinary measures against some of the nuns who signed the statement, sparking controversy among American Catholics, and intra-Catholic conflict on the abortion issue remained news for at least two years. This ad, however, strengthened the recognition and credibility of the CFC within the Catholic community and American politics.

=== 1990s ===
In 1992, CFC was classified as a non-governmental organization by the United Nations (U.N.); CFC subsequently participated in some U.N. conferences. With other groups, the CFC successfully lobbied against the naming of John M. Klink, a former representative of the Holy See at the U.N., to lead the State Department Bureau of Population, Refugees and Migration in 2001. More recently, it has assisted in drafting legislation with the stated goal of reducing abortions, partly by increasing financing for family planning.

In April 1995, the National Catholic Reporter published a letter by Marjorie Rieley Maguire, a theology professor, former CFC activist and co-author of CFC's 1984 The New York Times advertisement, "A Catholic Statement on Pluralism and Abortion". In her letter, Maguire described CFC as "an anti-woman organization" devoted to "the promotion of abortion, the defense of every abortion decision as a good, moral choice and the related agenda of persuading society to cast off any moral constraints about sexual behavior." Maguire also charged that when she was involved with CFC, she "was never aware that any of its leaders attended Mass" and that "various conversations and experiences convinced [her] they did not."

=== 2000s ===
In March 1999, CFC launched an unsuccessful campaign to downgrade the status of the Holy See in the United Nations to that of an NGO from that of a non-member state. Had the campaign, branded as "See Change", been successful, the Vatican would no longer have had a vote on UN policy nor speaking rights. The campaign drew support from 541 groups, including women's, family-planning and abortion groups, such as NARAL Pro-Choice America and Planned Parenthood.

The campaign was begun after Vatican representatives at various UN conferences blocked consensus on certain topics related to sexual and reproductive health, such as condom distribution and “safe” sex education in AIDS prevention programs and family planning, birth control, and abortion. Kissling, then CFC's president, asked: "Why should an entity that is in essence 100 square acres of office space and tourist attractions in the middle of Rome with a citizenry that excludes women and children have a place at the table where governments set policies affecting the very survival of women and children?"

The campaign was supported by European Parliament politicians from three Dutch parties. It was also supported by Marco Pannella, a founder of the Italian Radicals.

The campaign faced difficulty in the UN from the start and, according to U.N. spokesperson Farhan Haq in 1999, seemed "unlikely" to succeed. Anglican Bishop John Baycroft said "The Vatican has as much right to be [in the UN] as any of the other countries", as the modern remnant of the Papal States. Pennsylvania State University professor Philip Jenkins wrote that the See Change campaign is anti-Catholic, and that the major diplomatic and mediation activity of the Vatican makes it deserve recognition far more than many other UN members.

In 2007, CFC's former Vice-President and Director of Communications, Jon O'Brien, was appointed President. In 2019, CFC's former Vice-President and Domestic Program Director, Sara Hutchinson Ratcliffe, was named Acting President. In October 2020, National Catholic Reporter columnist Jamie L. Manson took over as president of the organization, leaving her position at NCR.

== Operations and funding ==
CFC is not a membership organization but an advocacy group. It relies upon paid employees and committed volunteer activists that it selectively recruits in various regions.

In 2007, CFC had a budget of $3 million, increased from $2.5 million annually in the years leading up to 2003. It has been supported largely by secular foundations such as the Ford Foundation, John D. and Catherine T. MacArthur Foundation, Rockefeller Foundation, and the Playboy Foundation.

== Criticism ==
Criticism of CFC has largely come from authorities in the Catholic Church who disagree with the mission and purpose of the organization. Critics believe CFC undermines the Church’s authority and Catholic teaching through identifying as a Catholic organization while opposing the Church’s official stance on abortion. They claim that CFC is not authentically Catholic, but rather a puppet of secular abortion rights organizations and a front for "anti-Catholicism".

The United States Conference of Catholic Bishops (USCCB) opposes CFC and has stated that it "is not a Catholic organization, does not speak for the Catholic Church, and in fact promotes positions contrary to the teaching of the Church as articulated by the Holy See and the NCCB." This conflict came to a head in 1996 when members of CFC in the Diocese of Lincoln, Nebraska were threatened with excommunication if they did not leave the organization. Kissling responded by saying that people in favor of abortion rights who consider themselves to be "Catholics in good faith" should just "go about their lives as Catholics."

Helen M. Alvaré, an associate professor of law at the Catholic University of America, has asserted that CFC has "no grass-roots base among Catholics." She said the CFC arguments were not different from other pro-abortion rights groups. Pennsylvania State University professor and historian of religion Philip Jenkins wrote that CFC is a public voice for anti-Catholic opinions. He wrote that in 1991 Frances Kissling stated, "I spent twenty years looking for a government that I could overthrow without being thrown in jail. I finally found one in the Catholic church." Jenkins also writes that Kissling engages in "solid seventeenth-century anti-popery".

=== Excommunication ===
Bishop Fabian Bruskewitz of Lincoln, Nebraska, issued an interdict in March 1996 forbidding Catholics within his diocese from membership in 12 organizations including CFC. Bruskewitz stated that membership in any of these 12 groups "is always perilous to the Catholic Faith and most often is totally incompatible with the Catholic Faith." Members of the Diocese were given one month from the date of the interdict to remove themselves from participation in the named organizations or face automatic excommunication. Bruskewitz noted that heeding the ban on receiving the sacraments, which results from excommunication, would "be left to the person's conscience." Frances Kissling, then CFC president, said, "What we would advise people in that diocese to say is that, 'We consider ourselves to be Catholics in good faith, and we think you have rendered the wrong opinion, and to go about their lives as Catholics."

== See also ==
- Elizabeth Farians
- Leadership Conference of Women Religious
- Pastor's Initiative
- Charlotte Clymer
