= Ann Patrick Ware =

American nun (1920–2013)

- Born: 1920; Minneapolis, Minnesota, United States
- Died: 2013 (aged 92–93)
- Education: Webster College
- Organization: Sisters of Loretto
- Known for: Feminist activism

Sr. Ann Patrick Ware, SL (1920 – 2013) was an American Catholic religious sister and notable for her outspoken feminist activism in the 1970s and 1980s.

== Activism ==
Ware was an active participant in the organization, National Coalition for American Nuns. In 1982 she appeared on The Phil Donahue Show, defending her support for speaking out about abortion rights and voicing her opposition to the Hyde Amendment. She received significant criticism after her appearance on the Donahue show and unapologetically wrote the following in Ms. magazine, "None of the constraints of civil discourse seem to apply when this subject is discussed. Charity, the end-all and be-all of the Christian faith, in these hearts is dead for all except fetuses." In 1989, Ware worked with women in prisons through the New York organization, Institute for Women Today.

=== National Council of Churches of Christ ===
Ann Patrick Ware was an active member of the National Council of Churches and was involved with the group as far back as the late 1960s. She was the first Catholic nun to be appointed as a permanent staff member of the organization in 1968. That year she became a theological consultant to Church Women United.

In 1980 she served as one of their top theology executives. As part of her work with this group she was unafraid to call out sexism she saw within the church. In March 1980 she was quoted as saying, "The scriptures are unredeemably sexist. Even though here and there women may appear in favorable light, the overwhelming stance of writers towards women is that they are inferior to men, weak, needing protection and foolish. Wickedness in a woman is worse than in a man."

Ware also served as an associate director for the Commission on Faith and Order. She resigned from National Council of Churches in 1980 after voicing opposition to official positions of the Catholic Church. In the mid-1980s she worked part time for Church Women United.

== Political beliefs ==
=== Pluralist Statement on Abortion ===
In 1984, Ware was one of the signers of the ad A Catholic Statement on Pluralism and Abortion. In her 1993 publication, A Case Study in Oppression: A Theological and Personal Analysis, she said the statement was, "...a pivotal event in the U.S. Catholic Church, bearing testimony to the sexism which infects its procedures and to the struggle which congregations of Roman Catholic Sisters are waging for autonomy."

=== Refusal to pay taxes ===
Ware opposed war and was known for refusing to pay taxes that would fund military conflicts.

=== Support for prison reform ===
Ware was a longtime advocate for prison reform and worked with women prisoners on Rikers Island in New York.

=== Support for women's ordination ===
Ware was a proponent for women's ordination and was interviewed in the press accusing the Catholic Church of discrimination against women. In 1980 she was quoted as saying how sexism in religion, "...has robbed women of their capacity of ethical personal choices. The future lies in overcoming this hierarchical sexism."

== Personal life ==
Ware was born in Minneapolis in 1920. She graduated from Webster College in 1940. A former high school teacher, she became a professor of theology at Webster College in 1966. She worked as chair of the theology department at Webster College from 1957 to 1965. In 1968 she worked as a professor at the University of North Dakota. She moved to New York City in 1968 and spent time rooming with Sr. Mary Luke Tobin.

Ware was a Sister of Loretto for 72 years and she died in 2013 after hurting her leg in a bad fall.

== Publications ==
- A Case Study in Oppression: A Theological and Personal Analysis (1993)
- Midwives of the Future: American Sisters Tell Their Stories
- Naming Our Truth: Stories of Loretto Women
- "Perplexed Thoughts Upon Leaving the Church After Mass" (1977)
