= Church Women United =

Logo of Church Women United

Church Women United (CWU) is a national ecumenical Christian women's movement representing Protestant, Roman Catholic, Orthodox and other Christian women. Founded in 1941, as the United Council of Church Women, this organization has more than 1,200 local and state units in the United States and Puerto Rico. CWU's members represent 26 supporting denominations and organizations. Offices are located in New York City, Washington DC and at the United Nations.

== Mission and services ==
Church Women United's mission is to be a racially, culturally, and theologically inclusive Christian women's movement celebrating unity in diversity and working for a world of peace and justice, specifically for women and children. CWU strives to provide for its members resources and information on a range of social justice issues, opportunities for worship and action, and a network of women and women's organizations working to ensure a better world for all.

Church Women United holds four annual worship celebrations: World Day of Prayer, Human Rights Day, May Friendship Day, and World Community Day. These ecumenical worship celebrations are the centerpiece of CWU's ecumenical life and spiritual thrust. Each is celebrated around an annual theme, written by CWU members.

World Day of Prayer takes place on the first Friday in March, and brings together in prayer women from 170 countries.

The Human Rights Celebration began as a national event, in support of the UN Human Rights Day, and is now celebrated as a local unit event to honor individuals and groups who have done outstanding work in the field of human rights. As a local celebration it can be held at any time during the year.

First observed in 1933, May Friendship Day focuses on "creative and healing relationships" that exist in local communities, often including intergenerational activities, ecumenical Bible study and worship, and opportunities for action in one's local community. It is typically celebrated on the first Friday in May each year.

On World Community Day, first observed in 1939, Christian women pray and do projects that work towards global peace. It is an inclusive worship service, now adapted to include opportunities for interfaith participation and worship, to further CWU's commitment to peace and justice among all peoples and nations. It is typically celebrated during the first weekend in November.

The International Fellowship of the Least Coin (FLC) is a worldwide ecumenical movement of prayer for peace and reconciliation. Persons in this movement make a commitment to spend time in prayer, and to uphold in prayer others who are victims of jealousy, hatred, violence, and injustice. Every time one prays, she sets aside a "least coin" of her currency as a tangible token of her prayer. CWU is the custodian for FLC offerings in the United States.

Every four years CWU adopts a quadrennial priority to focus its social justice advocacy and action on a specific area or areas of need. The priority is used to guide CWU's work at the local, state and national levels. The priority for 2008–2012 is "Building a World Fit for All God's Children". This theme further breaks down into four "building blocks": health, economic justice, environmental care and peace. The priority for 2017–2020 is "Learning and Leading …Using the Principles of God’s Word," with the four "building blocks" being human rights, hunger and poverty, health and wellness, and diversity and inclusiveness.

== History ==
In 1941, three organizations – the Council of Women for Home Missions, the Committee on Women's Work of the Foreign Missions Conference, and the National Council of Federated Church Women – combined to form one national organization representing women from seventy Christian denominations. The new organization was originally called the United Council of Church Women (UCCW). The founders of Church Women United met in Atlantic City, NJ in December, 1941, while bombs were dropping on Pearl Harbor and the world was at war. Their first action, upon convening, was to circulate a petition signed by 84,000 church women "urging the United States at the signing of the United Nations Charter, to join and take its full responsibility in a world organization."

The action received wide publicity in the media, encouraging Eleanor Roosevelt to later involve the leaders of CWU in a conference at the White House on "How Women May Share in Post War Policy Making". Such action remains typical for CWU today, as its quest for informed prayer and prayerful action continues. Women in the movement affirm that prayer and action are inseparable and that both have immeasurable influence in the world.

== Current locations ==
As of 2017, there are CWU units in:

Arizona (State Office)

California (South Bay) (Southern California) (Northern California)

Connecticut

Florida (State Office)

Massachusetts (Cape Cod, MA)

Michigan

New Mexico (State Office)

New York (State Office) (Rochester)

North Carolina (State Office)

North Dakota (State Office)

Oregon (State Office)

South Carolina (Columbia, SC)

Texas (Austin, TX)

Virginia (State Office)

Wisconsin (Madison, WI)

Michigan

== Affiliated denominations ==
- African Methodist Episcopal Church, Women's Missionary Society
- African Methodist Episcopal Zion Church, Women's Home and Overseas Missionary Society
- American Baptist Churches in the USA, American Baptist Women's Ministry
- Christian Church (Disciples of Christ), Christian Women's Fellowship
- Christian Methodist Episcopal Church, Women's Missionary Council
- Church of God (Anderson), Women of the Church of God
- Community of Christ, Women's Ministries Commission
- Cumberland Presbyterian Church, Cumberland Presbyterian Women
- The Episcopal Church (United States), Episcopal Church Women
- The Evangelical Lutheran Church in America, Women of the ELCA
- International Council of Community Churches, Women's Christian Fellowship
- Korean American Church, Ecumenical Women's Fellowship
- The Mar Thoma Church, The Diocese of NA and Europe – Mar Women's Evangelistic Services
- The Mennonite Church USA, Mennonite Women
- Moravian Church in America – North, North Provincial Women's Board
- Moravian Church in America – South, South Provincial Women's Board
- National Baptist Convention of America, Women's Missionary Union
- National Baptist Convention USA, The Women's Department
- Presbyterian Church, Presbyterian Women
- Progressive National Baptist Convention
- Reformed Church in America, Reformed Church Women's Ministries
- Religious Society of Friends, Society of Friends Women
- United Church of Christ
- United Methodist Church, United Methodist Women

== Archival Collections of Church Women United ==
- Berkeley-Albany Church Women United, Graduate Theological Union Archives
- Church Women United in Dallas, Texas/Dallas History & Archives, Dallas Public Library
- Church Women United in Houston Records, 1911–2011, University of Houston Libraries Special Collections
- Church Women United in Illinois Records, Black Metropolis Research Consortium, University of Chicago
- Church Women United In Kansas, Kansas Historical Society
- Church Women United Naperville, Women and Leadership Archives Loyola University Chicago
- Church Women United Records, United Methodist Church General Commission on Archives and History

== See also ==
- Ann Patrick Ware, S.L.
- Katie Booth (scientist)
- Interchurch Center, site of the National Headquarters of Church Women United
- The Ribbon International
