= Marjorie Tuite =

American feminist activist (1922–1986)

Marjorie Tuite, OP (October 15, 1922 – June 28, 1986) was a progressive feminist activist on issues related to the Church and the larger world, such as racism, poverty, war and the ordination of women.

== Early life and education ==
She was born and raised in New York City and joined the Dominican Sisters of St Mary of the Springs Order (today Dominican Sisters of Peace) in 1942. She had an undergraduate degree from Fordham University, a master's degree from Manhattanville College in Education Theology, and a Doctor of Ministry from what is today University of Saint Mary of the Lake and Mundelein Seminary.

== Career ==
As an educator, Tuite filled a variety of roles. From 1960-1966, she taught English at Northwest Catholic High School in West Hartford, Connecticut. "Between 1973 and 1981 she was a member of the faculty at the Jesuit School of Theology in Chicago. Before her tenure at the Jesuit School of Theology, she served on the staff on the National Urban Training Center and The Archdiocesan Center for Religious Education, both in Chicago."

Tuite was a founder of and worked on a variety of different organizations. She was the Director of Ecumenical Action for Church Women United, and in 1970, she was among the founders of the National Assembly of Religious Women and served as its national coordinator.

== NETWORK ==
Tuite was a co-founder of the Catholic social justice group NETWORK. In late November 1975, Tuite was among the key organizers of the first International Women's Ordination Conference (WOC). She founded the Women's Coalition to Stop U.S. Intervention in Central America in 1982.

== Vatican 24 ==
Tuite was one of the "Vatican 24", religious sisters who had signed the Catholic Statement on Pluralism and Abortion published in the New York Times on October 7, 1984. The Vatican, via the Congregation for Institutes of Consecrated Life and Societies of Apostolic Life, reacted by threatening the sisters with dismissal from their respective religious congregations if they did not retract their statements, in accordance with Church doctrine. Tuite appeared on The Phil Donahue Show on January 28, 1985, along with fellow signers Patricia Hussey and Barbara Ferraro, to defend their position. Tuite became terminally ill with pancreatic cancer, during which time she was under great pressure from her order to retract her statement.

== Support for Jesse Jackson ==
In 1984, Tuite traveled to Central America as a member of the delegation that supported presidential candidate Jesse Jackson.

== Death ==
Tuite suffered from pancreatic cancer and need to have a tumor removed. Tuite died on June 28, 1986, aged 63, following her battle with pancreatic cancer.

== Funeral service ==
Her funeral mass caused controversy. At the mass at the Church of St. Vincent Ferrer on July 3, Dominican priest Father Matarazzo instructed the crowd of Catholics, Protestants, and other denominations and religions that only Catholics should come forward for Holy Communion. Sister Maureen Fiedler countered him by announcing to attendees that all would be welcome at Communion, including non-Catholics.

During the Consecration, the priest was surrounded by women, including Ruth McDonough Fitzpatrick of the Women's Ordination Conference. Fitzpatrick recalled that the priest elbowed the women "to give him his sacred space" but that they did not yield. Instead, the women extended their hands over the Eucharist and said the words of consecration "so loudly that you could hear it in [the] huge New York church." Many non-Catholics went forward to receive communion including the Protestant minister and peace activist William Sloane Coffin. Men and women from the peace movement and those working for human rights stood up spontaneously and shared memories of Tuite.

Fitzpatrick said that "Women-Church came into its own at Margie's funeral in the way that Margie wanted."

Tuite's ashes were taken to Nicaragua and, after they were taken through some of the villages where she had worked with local women, they were finally interred in a barrio of Managua.

== Archives ==
Tuite's papers can be found at the Women and Leadership Archives at Loyola University Chicago (WLA). According to the WLA blog, "Judy Vaughn donated research materials about Tuite to the Women and Leadership Archives (WLA) in 1996. Vaughn intended to write a book about Tuite, and the amount of detail in the papers attests to Tuite’s complex and dedicated life."

== Awards ==
Year	Award
1978	Catholic Committee Urban Ministry Award for commitment of social justice
1979	US Catholic Magazine Award for work with women in the church
1985	Boise Idaho Peace Quilt
1985	Mary Rhodes Award

== See also ==
- Donna Quinn
- Pax Christi
- Liberation theology
- Margaret Traxler
