= Jeannine Gramick =

American religious sister and LGBTQ advocate

The Reverend Sister Jeannine Gramick SL
- Born: 1942 (age 83–84); Philadelphia, Pennsylvania
- Occupations: Religious sister, academic

Jeannine Gramick, SL (/ˈɡræmɪk/ GRAM-ik; born 1942) is an American Catholic religious sister and advocate for lesbian, gay, bisexual, and transgender rights. She is also a co-founder of New Ways Ministry.

In 2021, Pope Francis addressed two letters to New Ways Ministry, in which he commended the organization for its outreach to the LGBTQ community and referred to Gramick as "a valiant woman" who had suffered much for her ministry. On October 17, 2023, Gramick and three other staff members of New Ways Ministry met with Pope Francis at his residence in Rome.

== Career ==
Gramick was born to a Polish Roman Catholic family in Philadelphia, and attended Catholic grade and high schools. She moved to Baltimore in 1960 to join the School Sisters of Notre Dame, teaching high school mathematics through the 1960s. Later, she was an associate professor of mathematics at the College of Notre Dame of Maryland in the early 1970s.

Having graduated in 1969 with an M.Sc. degree in mathematics from the University of Notre Dame, Gramick completed a Ph.D. at the University of Pennsylvania, obtained in 1975. Her outreach to the gay and lesbian community began in 1971, and in 1972 and 1973 she co-founded chapters of DignityUSA in Baltimore, and Washington, D.C., as well as the Conference for Catholic Lesbians.

Gramick co-founded with Fr. Robert Nugent, New Ways Ministry, a social justice center working for the reconciliation of lesbian/gay people and the Catholic Church.

Many publications written and edited by Gramick explain her positions and ministry, including "Homosexuality and the Catholic Church," "Homosexuality in the Priesthood and Religious Life," "The Vatican and Homosexuality," and "Voices of Hope: A Collection of Positive Catholic Writings on Lesbian/Gay Issues." She is the co-author with Fr. Robert Nugent of "Building Bridges: Gay and Lesbian Reality and the Catholic Church,". "Building Bridges" was translated into Italian and published as "Anime Gay: Gli omosessuali e la Chiesa cattolica" (Editori Riuniti, Rome, 2003).

She has served on the boards of the National Assembly of Women Religious, the Religious Network of Equality for Women, the Lambda Legal Defense and Education Fund, the Women's Ordination Conference and the National Coalition of American Nuns.

== Controversies ==
Gramick's activities have not been without controversy. In 1984, because of alleged ambiguities in her presentation of church teaching on homosexuality, the Archbishop of Washington prohibited her from engaging in any pastoral activities with respect to homosexual persons in the archdiocese. At the same time, the Vatican's Congregation for Institutes of Consecrated Life and for Societies of Apostolic Life ordered her and Fr. Robert Nugent to separate themselves from New Ways Ministry, stating that they were not to lead any pastoral care of homosexual persons without faithfully presenting the Church's teaching on homosexuality. In 1988, the Vatican opened an investigation of her and Fr. Nugent's activities, which after publication of their books and the possible doctrinal errors contained therein, was transferred in 1995 to the Congregation for the Doctrine of the Faith (CDF). In 1999, after a written dialogue with her and Fr. Nugent, the CDF issued a public notification that the two authors' writings and activities were doctrinally unacceptable and failed to correctly and fully present Catholic teaching on homosexuality and permanently prohibited them from any pastoral work with homosexual persons.

In 2000, her religious congregation, the School Sisters of Notre Dame, told her to cease speaking publicly on the topic of homosexuality. Gramick rejected the request, stating publicly, "I choose not to collaborate in my own oppression by restricting a basic human right [to speak]". After this, she transferred to the Sisters of Loretto, another congregation of Catholic women religious which supports Gramick’s ministries of education and advocacy.

In 2014, she was a signatory to an open letter to President Obama that urged him to expand U.S. funding of abortion services in the cases of rape, incest, and life endangerment in foreign countries, currently prohibited under U.S. law by the Helms Amendment.

In April 2015, Gramick was banned from speaking in the Diocese of Charlotte by Bishop Peter Jugis. A Diocese spokesman, on behalf of Bishop Jugis, stated: "We are not going to have someone who opposes Catholic teaching to be teaching in a Catholic diocese," The event titled Welcoming LGBT People and Their Families in Faith Communities was scheduled at St. Peter Catholic Church before the Bishop intervened.

The documentary film In Good Conscience: Sister Jeannine Gramick's Journey of Faith, by Barbara Rick, details Sister Gramick's decades of ministry and controversies with the Vatican.

== See also ==
- New Ways Ministry
- Homosexuality and Roman Catholicism
- Loretto Community
