= Frances Kissling =

American social activist and scholar

Frances Kissling (born 15 June 1943) is an activist in the fields of religion, reproduction, and women's rights. She is the president of the Center for Health, Ethics and Social Policy. She was president of Catholics for Choice (founded 1973) from 1982 until 2007, when she turned over the reins to Jon O'Brien. She is now a visiting scholar at the Center for Bioethics at the University of Pennsylvania, and at the Instituto de Investigaciones Filosóficas at UNAM, Mexico City. She regularly contributes pieces to The Nation and The Huffington Post. She contributed the piece "Dancing Against the Vatican" to the 2003 anthology Sisterhood Is Forever: The Women's Anthology for a New Millennium, edited by Robin Morgan.

== Early life ==
Kissling was born Frances Romanski into a Polish working-class family in New York City in 1943, to Thomas and Florence Romanski (née Rynkiewicz). Five years later, after having another daughter, her mother divorced and later married a man named Charles Kissling, with whom two more children were conceived. Inspired by the nuns at her Catholic school, she joined a convent in the early 1960s at age 19, but after just six months she left and enrolled in the New School.

== Abortion rights activism ==
Kissling became active in the women's movement in the 1960s. In 1970, after abortion was made legal in New York, she was asked to direct an abortion clinic in Pelham, which she accepted.

In 1977 she was appointed founding President of the National Abortion Federation. In 1978 she joined the board of Catholics for a Free Choice, and in 1982 she took over as president – a position she held for 25 years until her retirement in 2007.

She supports public funding for contraception and abortion, and is the co-author of Rosie: The Investigation of a Wrongful Death, with Ellen Frankfort.

Kissling was a 2007–2008 Fellow of the Radcliffe Institute Fellowship Program, part of the Radcliffe Institute for Advanced Study at Harvard University. Her project while in residence was a book, How to Think about Abortion: Pro-choice Reflections on Rights and Responsibility. She is currently a visiting scholar at the University of Pennsylvania Center for Bioethics.
