= National Assembly of Religious Women =

Roman Catholic social justice organization

The National Assembly of Religious Women was a Roman Catholic organization in the United States dedicated to the promotion of social justice. Founded in 1970 as the National Assembly of Women Religious, it changed its name in 1982 to denote the full inclusion of laity. The founding president was Ethne Kennedy; other founding members included Marjorie Tuite, Kathleen Keating, Rosalinda Ramirez, Linda Chavez, and Yolanda Tarango.

By 1975 the organization had 103 diocesan council members and direct ties to tens of thousands of religious sisters, as well as some clergy and laity as associates; it counted some 3,500 sisters in its grassroots. Its publications included the newsletter Probe and books promoting a response to the Second Vatican Council among Catholic women; the organization also produced materials related to justice education. Justice was a driving force behind meetings and activities of the Assembly; significant leaders besides Kennedy included Marjorie Tuite and Judy Vaughan. The organization's activities included mobilizing thousands of women during the 1970s to develop justice ministry workshops around the United States. The group held a national conference in 1989, and later in its life partnered with the United Way to do more work in the broader community.

The Assembly disbanded in 1995 due to financial concerns; even so its influence can be felt in other organizations established by its members, including NETWORK and the Women's Ordination Conference. A collection of the Assembly's records is held by the library of the University of Notre Dame.
