= Southern Association for Women Historians =

Professional organization in the US

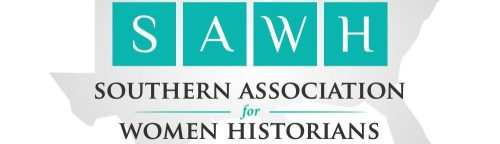
- Formation: November 1970
- Founded at: Louisville, Kentucky
- Type: Public charity
- Tax ID no.: 30-0748280
- Key people: Antoinette van Zelm (President)
- Website: thesawh.org

The Southern Association for Women Historians (SAWH) is a professional organization in the United States founded in 1970. It supports the study of women's and gender history of the American South, gives annual book and article prizes, and provides networking opportunities for its members, especially at its triennial conference.

== Mission ==
The Southern Association for Women Historians (SAWH) is an American nonprofit professional association formed in 1970 in Louisville, Kentucky to support women historians living in the South and provide a forum for the study of southern women's history. Most of the organization's members study the American South but historians in any field who live in the southern states are encouraged to join. The SAWH welcomes public historians, independent scholars, and graduate students in addition to academic historians. The organization is known for its support and mentoring of graduate students. The SAWH “values individuals and their differences including race, economic status, gender expression and identity, sex, sexual orientation, ethnicity, national origin, first language, religion, age, and ability status." The SAWH is governed by an Executive Council and its work is accomplished by committees made up of volunteers from among the membership.

== History ==
In December 1969, a group of women historians associated with the American Historical Association formed an independent association, the Coordinating Committee on Women in the Historical Profession. At a November 1970 meeting of the Southern Historical Association, several women who had attended that previous meeting formed the Southern Association of Women Historians in Louisville, Kentucky. In 1983, it was renamed to the Southern Association for Women Historians (SAWH).

The organization's first conference was in June 1988 in Spartanburg, South Carolina. The conference has been held every three years since then, except in 2021, when the conference was delayed to 2022 due to precautions against COVID-19.

The talks at these conferences have been well received. Several volumes of original scholarship have resulted from the conference papers, including:

- Sisterly Networks: Fifty Years of Southern Women's Histories (2020)
- Entering the Fray: Gender, Politics, and Culture in the New South (2009)
- Women Shaping the South: Creating and Confronting Change (2006)
- Clio’s Southern Sisters: Interviews with Leaders of the Southern Association for Women Historians (2004)
- Searching for Their Places: Women in the South Across Four Centuries (2003)
- Negotiating Boundaries of Southern Womanhood: Dealing with the Powers that Be (2000)
- Beyond Image and Convention: Explorations in Southern Women’s History (1998)
- Taking Off the White Gloves: Southern Women and Women Historians (1998)
- Hidden Histories of Women in the New South (1994)
- Southern Women: Histories and Identities (1988)

== Prizes and fellowships ==
In 1989, the organization established the A. Elizabeth Taylor Prize for the best scholarly article on Southern women's history, and in 1992 established the Jacquelyn Dowd Hall Prize for the best graduate student paper submitted to the triennial conference. In addition to these prizes, the SAWH gives two book awards annually: the Julia Cherry Spruill Prize for the best published book in southern women's history, broadly construed, and the Willie Lee Rose Prize, for the best book on any topic in southern history written by a woman (or women). Every other year, the SAWH awards the Anne Firor Scott Mid-Career Fellowship to support scholars who are working on a second book or similar project in southern and/or gender history.

== 50th Anniversary ==
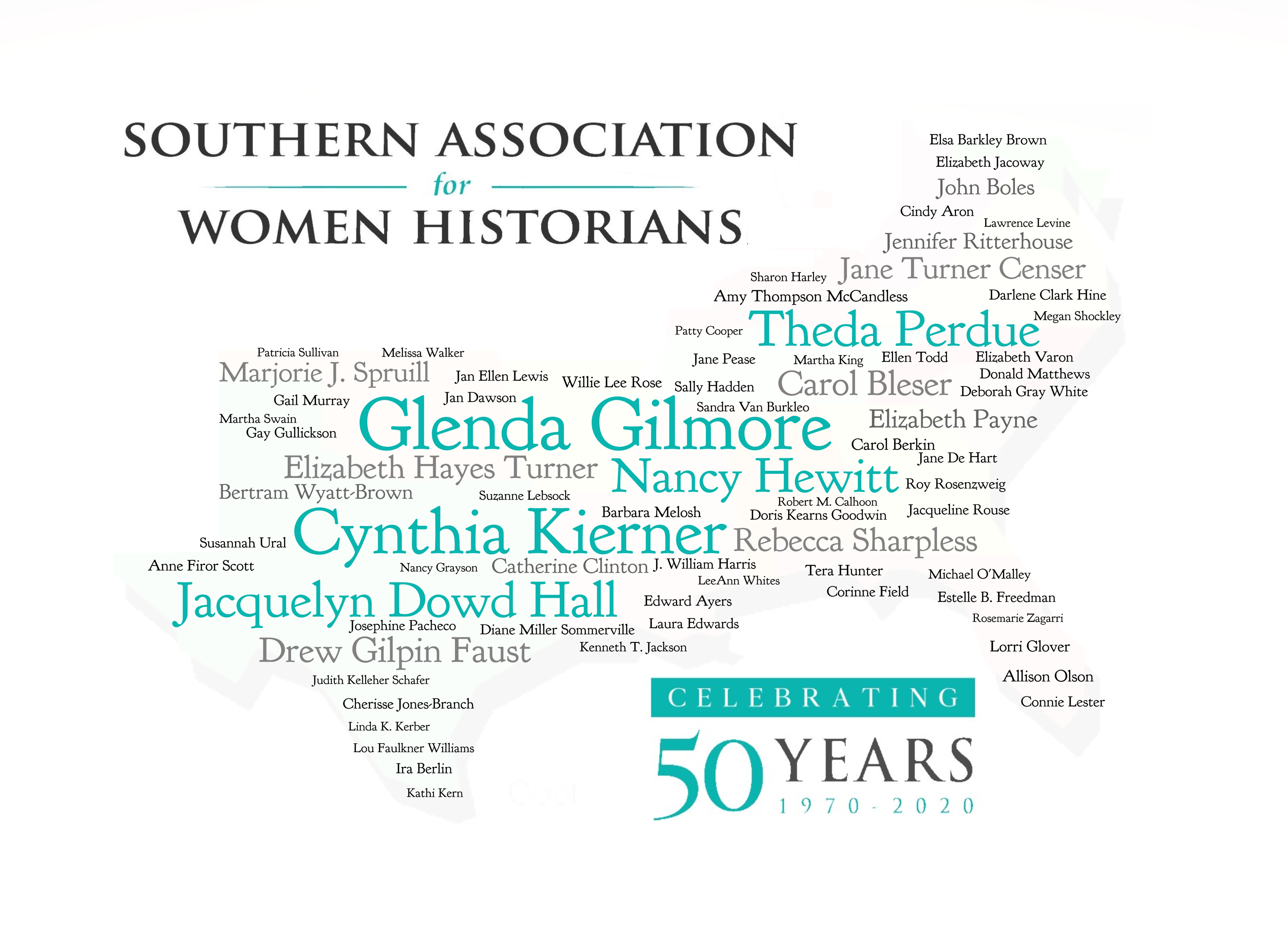
50th Anniversary Mentorship Wall of Fame

Due to restrictions of the COVID-19 pandemic, the SAWH hosted a celebratory meeting and annual lecture online during the annual Southern Historical Association meeting. The SAWH Annual Address and Awards Ceremony took place on November 20, 2020, hosted by SAWH President Jennifer L. Ritterhouse. The recording of the event is viewable on the SAWH website. During the Web conference, the 50th Anniversary Mentorship Wall of Fame was unveiled. Names of the mentors can be viewed by clicking on the image of the Wall of Fame.

In Baltimore in November 2022, the SAWH celebrated the organization's 50th anniversary in person at the Southern Historical Association annual meeting. After the Annual Address by Amy Murrell Taylor, members enjoyed a reception at the Reginald F. Lewis Museum of Maryland African American History & Culture. The organization honored all fourteen past presidents who were in attendance. A special cake celebrated 2022 president Anne Rubin, 2021 president Diane Miller Sommerville, and 2020 president Jennifer Ritterhouse, as the latter two had not had the opportunity to have an in-person reception in their honor due to the pandemic.

== Learning opportunity ==
The Southern Association for Women Historians has created resources, such as the online Mentoring Toolkit and the Mentoring in Action webinar series, to assist women historians and graduate students. These resources provide insights and information from prominent scholars in the field.

== Presidents of the Southern Association for Women Historians ==
SAWH Presidents since 1970
Date	First Name(s)	Last Name	Affiliation
1970–1972	Charlotte M.	Davis (co-chair)	Clark College
1970–1972	Mollie C.	Davis (co-chair)	West Georgia College
1973–1974	Constance Ashton	Myers	U. of South Carolina, Columbia
1975	Arnita	Jones	U. of Louisville and Indiana U. Southeast
1976	Rosemary	Carroll	Coe College
1977	Helena	Lewis	Harvard U.
1978	Martha	Swain	Texas Woman's University
1979	Judith Fenner	Gentry	U. of Southwestern Louisiana
1980	Carol K.	Bleser	Colgate U.
1981	Elizabeth	Jacoway	U. of Arkansas, Little Rock
1982	JoAnn "Jody"	Carrigan	U. of Nebraska, Omaha
1983	Betty J.	Brandon	U. of South Alabama
1984	Margaret Ripley	Wolfe	East Tennessee State U.
1985	Darlene Clark	Hine	Michigan State U.
1986	Theda	Perdue	Clemson U.
1987	Joanne V.	Hawks	U. of Mississippi
1988	Judith	Jennings	Appalshop, Inc.
1989	Virginia "Ginger"	Bernhard	U. of St. Thomas, Houston
1990	Julia Kirk	Blackwelder	U. of North Carolina, Charlotte
1991	Marlene Hunt	Rikard	Samford U.
1992	Constance "Connie" B.	Schulz	U. of South Carolina
1993	Elsa Barkley	Brown	SUNY, Binghamton
1994	Janet L.	Coryell	Western Michigan U., Kalamazoo
1995	Kathleen	Berkeley	U. North Carolina, Wilmington
1996	Marjorie Spruill	Wheeler	U. of Southern Mississippi
1997	Elizabeth Hayes	Turner	U. of North Texas
1998	Catherine	Clinton	Wofford College
1999	Drew Gilpin	Faust	U. of Pennsylvania
2000	Amy Thompson	McCandless	College of Charleston
2001	Jacqueline Anne	Rouse	Georgia State U.
2002	Sandra Gioia	Treadway	Library of Virginia
2003	Jane Turner	Censer	George Mason U.
2004	Michele	Gillespie	Wake Forest U.
2005	Stephanie	Cole	U. of Texas at Arlington
2006	Glenda	Gilmore	Yale U.
2007	Cynthia "Cindy" A.	Kierner	U. of North Carolina at Charlotte
2008	Laura F.	Edwards	Duke U.
2009	Melissa	Walker	Converse College
2010	Jane	Dailey	U. of Chicago
2011	Sally G.	McMillen	Davidson College
2012	Beverly Greene	Bond	U. of Memphis
2013	Rebecca	Sharpless	Texas Christian U.
2014	Emily	Clark	Tulane U.
2015	Lorri	Glover	St. Louis U.
2016	Angela	Boswell	Henderson State (Arkansas) U.
2017	Megan	Taylor-Shockley	Clemson U.
2018	Barbara	Krauthamer	U. of Massachusetts, Amherst
2019	Janet L.	Allured	McNeese State U.
2020	Jennifer	Ritterhouse	George Mason U.
2021	Diane Miller	Sommerville	Binghamton U. SUNY
2022	Anne Sarah	Rubin	U. of Maryland, Baltimore County
2023	Antoinette G.	van Zelm	Middle Tennessee State U. Center for Historic Preservation

== In popular culture ==
Murder, She Wrote: The Last Free Man (TV movie. May 2, 2001) https://www.imdb.com/title/tt0284330/?ref_=tt_urv
