= Colyer (disambiguation) =

Colyer is a community in Pennsylvania.

Colyer may also refer to:

As a given name

- Colyer Meriwether (1858–1920), American historian, educator and writer

As a surname

- Colyer (surname)

== See also ==
- Collier (disambiguation)
- Collyer (disambiguation)
