= Southern Historical Association =

Scholarly association

The Southern Historical Association is a professional academic organization of historians focusing on the history of the Southern United States. It was organized on November 2, 1934. Its objectives are the promotion of interest and research in Southern history, the collection and preservation of the South's historical records, and the encouragement of state and local historical societies in the South. As a secondary purpose the organization fosters the teaching and study of all areas of history in the South.

== History ==
The association was preceded by another, with a similar name--the Southern History Association, a short-lived organization with a very academic aspect to it; it folded in 1909 after a little over a decade. A new organization devoted to the same subject matter was conceived in the 1920s by Frederick Jackson Turner, who urged his doctoral student Thomas Perkins Abernethy to build a network that could sustain an organization similar to the American Historical Association. Two developments, according to historian and later SHA president Bethany Johnson, led to the association's founding: the growing desire since the late 19th century among Southern historians to professionalize, and the Southern Renaissance, which saw the formation of many professional academic societies in the South.

Among the association founders were Thomas Perkins Abernethy, W. Darrell Overdyke of Centenary College of Louisiana, and Philip M. Hamer of the National Archives.

== The Journal of Southern History ==
The SHA publishes The Journal of Southern History. John B. Boles was one of the editors.

The SHA maintains two permanent offices: the editorial offices, located at Rice University, and the secretary-treasurer's office, located at the University of Georgia.

=== Presidents ===
- Charles P. Roland (1981)
- Carl Degler (1986)
- Anne Firor Scott (1989)
- Jack Temple Kirby (d. 2009)
- William J. Cooper (2009-)
- Barbara Fields (2015)
- Catherine Clinton (2016)
- John B. Boles (2017)
- Jane Turner Censer (2018)
- Bill Link (2019)
- Thavolia Glymph (2020)
- Steven Hahn (2021)
- Glenda Gilmore (2022)
- Joseph P Reidy (2023)
- Richard Blackett (2024)
- Lorri Glover (2025)
- Laura F. Edwards (2026)
- Tera Hunter (2027)
