= John Collier =

John Collier may refer to:

== Arts and entertainment ==
- John Collier (caricaturist) (1708–1786), English caricaturist and satirical poet
- John Payne Collier (1789–1883), English Shakespearian critic and forger
- John Collier (painter) (1850–1934), English artist and author
- John Collier (fiction writer) (1901–1980), British-born author and screenplay writer
- John Collier (sculptor) (born 1948), American sculptor and artist
- Basil Collier (John Basil Collier, 1908–1983), British author of books on military history

== Public officials ==
- John A. Collier (1787–1873), American lawyer and politician
- John J. Collier (1815–1892), Superior Court judge from Atlanta, Georgia
- John Collier (MP) (1769–1849), member of parliament for Plymouth

== Sportspeople ==
- Jock Collier (John C. Collier, 1897–1940), Scottish footballer and manager
- John Collier (athlete) (1907–1984), American hurdler

== Others ==
- John Howell Collier (1898–1980), U.S. Army general
- John W. Collier (1929–1950), U.S. Army soldier and Medal of Honor recipient
- John G. Collier (1935–1995), British chemical engineer and administrator
- John Collier (sociologist) (1884–1968), American social reformer, sociologist, writer and Native American advocate
- John Collier Jr. (1913–1992), his son, American anthropologist and photographer
- R. John Collier, American microbiologist and biochemist

== Companies ==
- John Collier (clothing retailer), a British chain of men's clothing shops

== See also ==
- Jonathan Collier, American television writer
- Collier (disambiguation)
