= Upon the Altar of Work =

2020 book by Betsy Wood

Upon the Altar of Work: Child Labor and the Rise of a New American Sectionalism
- Cover
- Author: Betsy Wood
- Language: English
- Series: Working Class in American History
- Subject: Child labor, American history, sectionalism
- Genre: History
- Publisher: University of Illinois Press
- Publication date: September 14, 2020
- Publication place: United States
- Pages: 266
- ISBN: 978-0-252-04344-4

Upon the Altar of Work: Child Labor and the Rise of a New American Sectionalism is a 2020 book by American historian Betsy Wood, published by University of Illinois Press and is part of its Working Class in American History series. (Note: Working Class in American History is a series published by University of Illinois Press. Founded in 1978, the series has published over 130 books in labor history. The series was established when labor history as a field was breaking into the dominant narratives of U.S. history. The editors include Julie Greene, Jim Barrett, and Nelson Lichtenstein.) The book studies debates over child labor in the United States from the 1850s through the 1930s, arguing that these conflicts perpetuated sectional divisions between North and South that originated in disputes over slavery. Wood traces how competing views of labor, freedom, and government authority shaped American society after emancipation, culminating in the defeat of the proposed Child Labor Amendment in the 1920s and the limited child labor provisions of the Fair Labor Standards Act of 1938. The book is based on her doctoral dissertation at the University of Chicago—a dissertation that received the Herbert G. Gutman Prize for Best Dissertation in Labor and Working-Class History.

== Background ==
Wood conceived the book while studying at the University of Chicago, where she worked with scholars including Thomas C. Holt, Julie Saville, and Amy Dru Stanley who were exploring questions about emancipation and the meaning of freedom in post-emancipation societies. The project emerged from a conversation with Saville, who suggested examining the legacy of the anti-slavery movement as a way to trace connections between nineteenth and twentieth-century reform movements. Wood's initial research into abolitionist sources unexpectedly led her to child labor as a direct continuation of anti-slavery activism. She was particularly influenced by scholarship on post-emancipation societies, including Holt's co-edited volume "Beyond Slavery," which examined the questions and struggles that emerged in societies that transitioned from slavery to "freedom." Wood discovered that while historians had written extensively about child labor reform as a progressive narrative, no one had examined it through the lens of sectional conflict or connected it to the historiography of slavery and freedom. Her research revealed not only a movement to end child labor but also an organized counter-movement that developed along North-South lines, challenging conventional narratives about Progressive Era reform.

== Summary ==
Wood documents how debates over child labor in the United States from the 1850s through the 1930s perpetuated the sectional divisions originally rooted in conflicts over slavery. She traces the evolution of competing visions of labor, freedom, morality, and the role of the state that emerged from these debates and shaped American society long after emancipation.

The book opens by situating early child labor debates within the antebellum sectional crisis. During the 1850s, defenders of slavery pointed to industrial child labor in the North as evidence of free capitalism's moral failures, while Northern antislavery reformers promoted child labor as a form of moral uplift that embodied the virtues of free society. These opposing views established patterns of thought that would persist for decades.

Following the Civil War, Wood shows how emancipation and Reconstruction shaped evolving attitudes toward children's work. The experiences of formerly enslaved children and ongoing debates about free labor ideology influenced how Americans understood the relationship between childhood, work, and freedom. During this period, reform efforts initially emerged in the South itself, creating tensions between those seeking to assert regional autonomy and those advocating for national standards.

The Progressive Era witnessed an intensification of these sectional divisions. Northern reformers, influenced by the Social Gospel movement, framed child labor as a moral crusade against capitalist greed. They portrayed children as being sacrificed on the "altar of work" - offered up to the gods of profit by exploitative industrialists. These reformers particularly emphasized the vulnerability of girls, whose labor supposedly threatened their future roles as wives and mothers. Meanwhile, Southern manufacturers and their allies mounted fierce resistance to federal intervention, defending child labor as part of traditional agrarian values and familial authority.

The proposed Child Labor Amendment of 1924 crystallized these opposing worldviews. The author shows how the battle over the amendment embodied a new form of sectionalism suited to the industrial age. Northern reformers, increasingly secular and bureaucratic in their approach, championed federal authority as essential to protecting children and ensuring progress. Their opponents - a coalition of Southern manufacturers, rural families, and traditionalists - viewed the amendment as a spiritual threat to their way of life. For them, the "altar of work" represented not exploitation but the sacred value of labor in forming character, particularly for boys. They defended Scripture, family, and tradition against what they saw as the encroachment of a godless bureaucratic state.

The defeat of the Child Labor Amendment represented a victory for this traditionalist coalition. When child labor provisions were finally included in the Fair Labor Standards Act of 1938, they were limited in scope and reflected the enduring cultural divisions that the decades-long battle had created. Wood argues that these debates established lasting fault lines in American society between those who embraced a progressive, consumer-oriented vision guaranteed by federal authority and those who defended traditional sources of moral authority rooted in family, faith, and local community.

Wood demonstrates how child labor became a framework for Americans to negotiate fundamental questions about the nature of freedom, the limits of state power, and the sources of moral authority in an industrializing nation. The book reveals how the legacy of sectional conflict over slavery was transformed but not erased, finding new expression in battles over child welfare that continue to resonate in contemporary debates about government, family, and tradition.

== Reviews ==
American historian Catherine A. Jones praised Wood's "expanded chronological framework" for its value in showing how sectional conflict pushed northern reformers to reexamine children's labor within free labor ideology. She pointed out that Wood's narrative begins "a half century earlier" than typically recognized, among scholars, which allows Wood to connect the child labor movement to the larger struggle over slavery's future. The reviewer emphasized that Wood demonstrates how child labor served as "a lightning rod within larger conflicts over the moral and social costs of capitalism." Jones suggested that Wood implicitly argued regulatory failures resulted from reformers' failure to collaborate with working children and their parents as much as from industrialist resistance.

Historian William McGovern noted that Wood managed to "escape the deep ruts of previous scholarship" while navigating "well-traveled terrain," and crafted an "innovative and persuasive narrative" that traced reformers' evolution from free labor ideology to faith in the modern bureaucratic state. McGovern observed that during the 1910s, child labor reformers embraced modern secular bureaucracy while opponents rallied around traditional morality, resulting in what Wood characterized as a "new" sectionalism that formed "an imaginary new Mason–Dixon line . . . within capitalist society." He described the work as "well-researched, crisply argued, and excellent addition to the scholarship," though he acknowledged that Wood made no promises to include children's voices and delivered few of their perspectives. McGovern said that the contest over child labor revealed a deepening sectionalism that was "as much ideological as it was geographical."

Historian Brian Rouleau of Texas A&M University praised Wood's work as "fascinating" and commended her for making "well-worn subject matter feel fresh, exciting, and original." He highlighted the book's innovative approach in connecting nineteenth-century antislavery reform with twentieth-century child labor debates, demonstrating how the abolitionist impulse spread to new fields after emancipation. The reviewer appreciated Wood's expansion of the historical perspective on moral and social questions, noting that she successfully drew new connections between different reform movements across centuries. Rouleau acknowledged minor limitations regarding international perspectives but emphasized that these "pale in comparison to the book's signal achievement." He concluded that Wood's work revealed both the progress made in combating child labor and reminded readers of work yet to be done.

James Marten, author of The Children's Civil War (1998), identified Wood's work as making "at least two original contributions to the long and storied historiography": extending the chronology back to the 1850s and rooting child labor reform firmly in the sectional conflict that shaped American politics. He noted that Wood organized the book chronologically and thematically, tracing how reformers altered approaches from seeking state and federal legislation to pursuing a constitutional amendment, and how the issue divided northern and southern activists along lines of work's necessity, government regulation, and free enterprise. The reviewer emphasized that child labor debates revolved around "the role of children in the economy and the responsibility of society to children" in post-Civil War discussions of capitalism, government authority, and welfare reform.

Southern labor historian Jared Roll called the work "an exemplary work of intellectual and political history," praising Wood's "skilled analysis" that tracks arguments against child labor across decades with "acute attention to both specific language and symbols and the wider context." Roll appreciated Wood's insight into how northern reformers shifted from free labor ideology to consumerist values while southern opponents fashioned "a new moral argument against the regulation of capitalism that was now national in scope." In particular, Roll praised Wood for deploying “a brilliant analysis of the cultural power of the toy industry.” He said that her focus on elite subjects leaves room for future studies on how ordinary people, particularly child workers and their parents, interacted with reform debates.

In her review in German, Nina Schneider (Note: From the Centre for Global Cooperation Research, Universität Duisburg-Essen) acknowledged Wood's "novel framework" of viewing child labor reform through the lens of US sectionalism. She appreciated Wood's "thick description" of conflicts within the National Child Labor Committee and the detailed exploration of how race and gender shaped reform debates from the 1850s to 1930s. However, Schneider challenged what she considered Wood's monocausal explanation, arguing that while child labor reform was "certainly marked by US sectionalist thought," it was not simply a continuation of it. She critiqued the book's omission of Florence Kelley's NAACP involvement and its limited treatment of agricultural child labor, especially regarding Chicano children. Schneider suggested that Wood "tries too hard to make a bold and coherent overall argument" and noted the study would benefit from international comparisons, particularly with post-abolitionist countries like Brazil where race arguments paradoxically both legitimized and delegitimized child labor.

Jasmin Bath described Wood's book as "engaging" and emphasized its invitation to "re-evaluate the history of sectionalist conflict through the lens of child labor reform." Bath highlighted Wood's argument that children's workplace presence became a battleground where northerners and southerners redefined their understandings of "labor, freedom, morality, and the market" in modern capitalist society. She pointed out to the author's characterization of opposing forces as "child labor abolitionists" versus "cultural warriors.".

In her review, Megan Birk focused on Wood's investigation of agricultural labor as a blind spot in reform efforts, noting that more than half of all child labor was farm-based. Birk observed that Wood demonstrates how sectional language undermined federal child labor initiatives, especially through the alienation of southern allies like Edgar Gardner Murphy, whose concerns about federal overreach were dismissed by northern reformers.

Historian and former President of the Southern Historical Association William A. Link praised Wood's work as "ambitious" and said that it was the first study with such breadth, examining child labor reform in a transregional context. Link highlighted the broad chronological approach spanning from the antebellum period through the 1930s, and emphasized how the book traces a national debate about childhood that "began in the late antebellum years, peaked during the Progressive Era, and declined by the middle of the twentieth century."

Kevin A. Murphy described Wood's work as a "slim, engaging book" that explored debates over child labor from the 1850s to 1930s, offering a "new interpretation" that connected postbellum reform to the legacies of abolitionism and continued sectional tensions. Murphy believed that Wood traced a "bridge between the nineteenth and twentieth centuries constructed out of clashing interpretations over the need for and value of juvenile work," rather than viewing antebellum reform and the Progressive Era as distinct periods. He questioned whether Wood's focus on free labor ideology provided the best explanatory framework, suggesting that "the exploitative nature of capitalism within the United States" might offer a better through line between centuries. Murphy considered that despite raising questions about regional unity and age as a category of analysis, the book offered valuable insights for scholars of childhood, capitalism, labor, and the Progressive Era.

Charles L. Lumpkins, of the Pennsylvania State University, stated that Wood contributed to child labor reform historiography by showing how reformers responded to North-South sectional disputes over free versus unfree labor from the 1850s to 1930s. He traced Wood's five chapters, which demonstrated how the Children's Aid Society promoted free labor republicanism through placing urban children with Midwestern farming families, and how Edgar Gardner Murphy injected sectionalist arguments and race into national debates while opposing federal control. The reviewer noted that Wood opened new perspectives on how sectional disputes informed child labor debates that emerged from discussions of free and slave labor. Lumpkins concluded that the book's bibliography and endnotes comprised nearly one-third of the text and would serve as valuable resources for scholars interested in child labor reform history.

In his review, American historian Timothy Messer-Kruse found Wood's argument convincing in demonstrating how federal regulation efforts foundered on northern "abolitionist-style rhetoric" that fueled southern defensiveness. The reviewer emphasized Wood's analysis of how northerners viewed southern child labor as forced and immoral while southerners pointed to northern capitalists exploiting children. He observed that Wood traced concern for child labor from antebellum roots to New Deal victories, showing how child workers became symbols of moral deficiencies in both North and South during deepening sectional conflict. Wood reversed the traditional scholarly approach by examining how child labor reform framed public thinking about free labor, capitalism's morality, and sectional character rather than viewing reform as emblematic of progressivism.

Erik Loomis, of the University of Rhode Island, traced Wood's argument from 1850s debates over free labor through the textile industry's migration South, where racial concerns about white degeneracy created potential for reform until sectional divisions re-emerged. The reviewer noted Wood's observation that Progressive Era reformers shifted focus from boys to girls in mills while southern defenders argued for boys' farm labor as character-building. Although Loomis suggested Wood might overstate claims about sectional hostility being unique to child labor reform, he found her point valid about the Child Labor Amendment's failure due to southern opposition. He praised Wood's intellectual history approach, stating it "provides a strong model for other labor historians looking to revisit classic battles for labor justice."

== Awards ==
The book was selected to be published after Wood's dissertation (which the book is based on) received the Herbert G. Gutman Prize for Best Dissertation in Labor and Working-Class History.
