= Atlanta Neighborhood Union =

- Formation: 1908
- Dissolved: 1970s
- Founder: Lugenia Burns Hope

The Atlanta Neighborhood Union was an African-American, women-led neighborhood organization in Atlanta, Georgia, started in 1908 by Lugenia Burns Hope, and chartered in 1911. The Union, "a prototype for self-help and social service organizations," was one of the most important organizations for Atlanta's social services, and worked in part by networking with the city's progressive whites. One of the organizations influenced by it was the Women's Political Council, of Montgomery, Alabama. It was dissolved in the 1970s.

== History ==
=== Foundation ===
The Atlanta Neighborhood Union was founded by Lugenia Burns Hope, a social reformer and the wife of Morehouse College president John Hope. The organization got started in June 1908, when Hope convened with eight other middle-class women. At the time, Atlanta was "the most segregated city in Georgia," and black children did not have a place to play: in Atlanta, there was "not a single playground or park for black children." In the end, the women got Morehouse College to give up some of its grounds for a playground; this success encouraged the group to continue. Morehouse College, especially the president's mansion, also served as a meeting place during the organization's early years.

The Union's aim was to initiate settlement projects to aid underprivileged black families. The city's neighborhoods were divided into districts, each of which had a board of directors which investigated living conditions in its area, especially the schooling situation. It collected demographic data to identify what types of programs would assist underprivileged citizens, and quickly started classes that taught such subjects as home and personal care. It sponsored health clinics and established after-school programs, and in 1909 began its political activity when it petitioned the Atlanta city council "to rid the community of 'a house of questionable character.'" The Union started a health clinic in 1915, which examined thousands of children, enrolled parents in health classes, and had boys' and girls' clubs. It made sure the city paved streets and provided adequate lighting and sewage treatment, and it replaced dilapidated houses.

The Union was especially interested in education, and besides providing classes itself, it petitioned the Atlanta Board of Education already in 1913 to build two new schools. Organizers at the district level investigated every single school, and reported that they were too small, improperly ventilated and dark, and generally overcrowded. These reports and lobbying efforts led to teachers' salaries being raised and a makeshift school being built in South Atlanta.

=== Professionalization ===
In the 1920s, the Union sought to professionalize, and to that end founded the Atlanta School of Social Work. During the Great Depression, it sought help from the Fulton County Relief Center, but met with race-based opposition from white city officials. The Union had received complaints that no Christmas gifts were given to destitute blacks, though whites did receive such assistance. Hope confronted a city official, and after she was grudgingly granted some gifts, the official added, "The problem of it is that you people do not contribute to these things," after which she explained that blacks were tax-paying citizens just as whites were.

In the 1930s, the Union went into decline, in part because men's organizations, such as the Atlanta Urban League, began to be active in the field of social work and welfare, and often employed professional workers. Still, in the early 1930s the organization's health clinic added dental and maternal care; annually, it examined more than 4,000 people.

== Later scholarship ==
The Union and its founder are the subject of Jacqueline Anne Rouse's Lugenia Burns Hope, Black Southern Reformer. Recent scholarship has studied the relationship between John Hope's stereotypical masculine language and activism and the limited space it allotted his wife, and to which extent such organizations had a "maternalist" ideology.

== See also ==
- Atlanta neighborhoods
