= Sasha Turner =

Jamaican-American historian

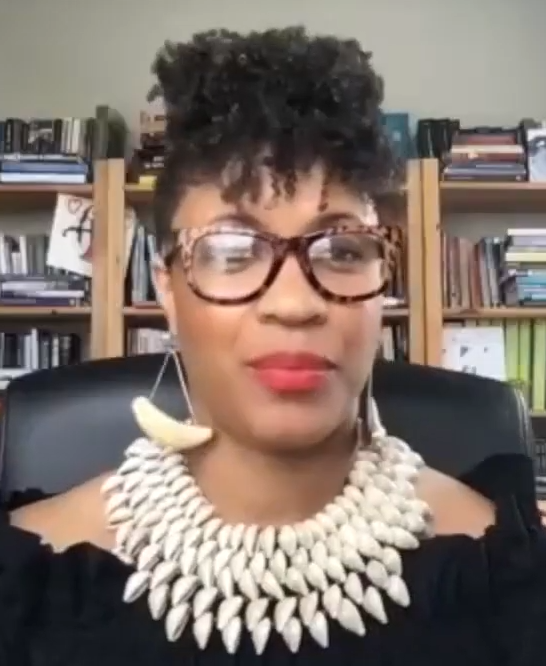
- Turner in 2021
- Education: University of Cambridge; University of the West Indies
- Scientific career
- Workplaces: Rutgers University; Washington University in St. Louis; Pennsylvania State University; Yale University; Johns Hopkins University
- Thesis: Gender and the management of Jamaican sugar estates, 1750-1842. (2007)

Sasha Deborah Turner is a Jamaican-American historian who is an associate professor of history of at the Johns Hopkins University Department of the History of Medicine. Her research considers the history of the Caribbean, with a particular focus on enslavement and colonialism. She is co-president of the Coordinating Council for Women in History.

== Early life and education ==
Turner is from the West Indies. She was an undergraduate student at the University of the West Indies, where she majored in history. She moved to the United Kingdom for her graduate studies. She started as a master's student in public health at the University of Cambridge, and stayed there to complete her doctoral research. Her research considered gender and 18th century Jamaican sugar estates. Turner was a postdoctoral fellow at Rutgers University, Washington University in St. Louis, Pennsylvania State University and Yale University.

== Research and career ==
In 2010, Turner was made an assistant professor at Quinnipiac University. She moved to Johns Hopkins University as an associate professor of history. Turner studies the history of the Caribbean. In particular, she studies the lives of women and children, and how they are impacted by racial and gender stereotypes. She has studied the role of emotion in enslavement and colonialism. Whilst writing her first book, Contested Bodies: Pregnancy, Childrearing and Slavery in Jamaica, Turner became horrified by the high rates of infant mortality amongst Caribbean colonies. She started to investigate how enslaved women handled the deaths of their children. She explored these themes in her essays on black maternal grief.

Turner is a contributor to the African American Intellectual History Society.

== Awards and honors ==
- Berkshire Conference of Women Historians Book Prize
- Southern Association for Women Historians Julia Spurill Prize
- Latin American and Caribbean Section of the Southern Historical Association Murdo J. McLeod Prize
- African American Intellectual History Society Maria Stewart Prize
- Association for Black Women's History/Association of African American Life and History Letitia Woods Brown Memorial Prize
- Southern Historical Association of Women Historians A. Elizabeth Taylor Prize
- North American Conference on British Studies Judith R. Walkowitz Prize
- Latin American and Caribbean Section of the Southern Historical Association Kimberly Hanger Prize

== Selected publications ==
- Turner, Sasha (2019). Contested Bodies: pregnancy, childrearing, and slavery in Jamaica. [Place of publication not identified]: University of Pennsylvania Press. ISBN 978-0-8122-2460-3. OCLC 1102467452. Archived from the original on April 21, 2017.
- Turner, Sasha (2017). "The nameless and the forgotten: maternal grief, sacred protection, and the archive of slavery". Slavery & Abolition. 38 (2): 232–250. doi:10.1080/0144039X.2017.1316962. ISSN 0144-039X. OCLC 7065547784. S2CID 152228475.
- Turner, Sasha (2011). "Home-grown slaves: women, reproduction, and the abolition of the slave trade, Jamaica 1788-1807". Journal of Women's History. 23 (3): 39–62. doi:10.1353/jowh.2011.0029. PMID 22145181. Wikidata Q46935252.
