= Collyer =

Collyer may refer to:

== People ==
- Collyer (surname)
- Collyer brothers, famous recluses
- Collyer brothers (game designers), the creators of Championship Manager

== Locations ==
- Collyer, Kansas, United States, a city in Trego County
- The College of Richard Collyer, also known as Collyer's, in Horsham, West Sussex, England

== See also ==
- Collier (disambiguation)
- Colyer (disambiguation)
