= Block club =

A block club, block group or block association is a type of local organization found in some urban areas in the United States, especially in the Midwest. A block club typically focuses on one or both sides of a city block on a single street, but some block clubs extend over larger areas. A tenant council, which serves similar purposes within a single building or complex, is sometimes called a "vertical block club".

Block clubs are established through community organizing. They may be organized autonomously at the block level or by a larger organization. The form of organizing that leads to block clubs is sometimes called block organizing. Some block clubs dissolve after achieving a particular goal for which they were organized. Others last for decades. Block clubs may link up into broader groups in order to accomplish broader goals; these groups are also sometimes called "block associations". Block clubs are fairly easy to organize and do not require a formal structure, although many block clubs adopt one. But the same informality that makes block clubs easy to organize also makes them difficult to sustain, especially if the club is organized by a single person who then becomes inactive or dies.

Cities with particularly strong block club traditions include Chicago and Buffalo. In some cities, there are formal partnerships between city government and block clubs, such as under the Department of Neighborhoods in Detroit. This type of existing relationship between block clubs and city government can help a city handle crises more effectively.

Block clubs often work on crime prevention, such as setting up a neighborhood watch, and "getting to know your neighbors" activities such as block parties. With the introduction of community policing in Chicago in the 1990s, mayor Richard M. Daley made the Chicago Police Department a major organizer of block clubs.

== History ==
Block clubs are historically associated with urban African American culture and were first popularized by the Urban League. However, people of many different races join and organize block clubs. Block clubs have been used by white communities to combat racial integration, as for example by Francis X. Lawlor in West Englewood.

Block clubs grew out of an earlier Urban League practice of organizing "neighborhood unions", which was originated in 1908 by Lugenia Burns Hope and the Atlanta Neighborhood Union. Urban League workers in Pittsburgh refined this by organizing mothers at the block level, and the practice soon spread to St. Louis, Chicago, and beyond. During World War II, the Office of Civil Defense likewise organized some urban areas into "block units".

By the 1950s, block club organizing had become a common form of civic engagement. Chicago Urban League president Alva Maxey, writing in 1957, described how several block club-initiated programs had been adopted by the city government as official initiatives, including neighborhood "clean-up parades" and the practice of clearing vehicles from a street before the city street sweepers arrived.

== See also ==
- Chōnaikai
- Neighborhood association
