= Coordinating Council for Women in History =

American professional organization

The Coordinating Council for Women in History is a national professional organization for women historians in the United States. It was founded in 1969 as the Coordinating Committee on Women in the Historical Profession to promote recruitment and scholarship among women historians. It is an affiliate organization of the American Historical Association.

== History ==
The Coordinating Committee on Women in the Historical Profession (CCWHP) was founded in 1969 by activists who wanted to introduce feminism into the framework of the American Historical Association. Because the American Historical Association at that time mostly excluded people of color, women, and other groups, the CCWHP formed with the aims of expanding research into women's history, lobbying to oppose sexism and racism in the profession, and recruiting women to join the field. At the time the organization was formed, Title IX had not yet passed, and women were likely to be excluded from admission to graduate schools and professional degrees and faced broad discrimination in hiring practices, or in attaining tenure. Male professors dominated the profession and women were mostly excluded from careers, including the ability to present papers at meetings, serve as reviewers or authors of scholarly publications, serve on committees or in leadership positions.

The group was formed after political scientist and activist Berenice A. Carroll circulated a letter urging women who were going to attend the American Historical Association's annual meeting in Washington, DC, in December to come together and discuss creating their own organization. Twenty-five historians signed up to attend a meeting to discuss launching a women's affiliate. Though regional affiliations had previously existed to support women’s issues in the history field, the CCWHP was the first organization that sought to represent women on a national scale. At the 1970 annual meeting of the Organization of American Historians (OAH), CCWHP presented arguments for advancing women in the field. They were successful in obtaining a resolution to include women's history in academic programs content, but the Organization of American Historians left the status of women in the profession up to the prerogative of the American Historical Association.

Members who had joined the call to action began, with the support of CCWHP, to create regionally focused historical associations specifically for women. Among them were the West Coast Association of Women Historians (1969), the Caucus of Women in History which became the Southern Association for Women Historians (1970), the New York Metropolitan Area Group (1971), the New England Association of Women Historians (1972), the Berkshire Conference on the History of Women (1973), Women Historians of the Midwest (1973), Upstate New York Women's History Organization (1975), and the Association of Black Women Historians (1979), among others. In 1974, they created the Conference Group on Women's History (CGWH), as a means to separate teaching and scholarship (CGWH) from the activist (CCWHP) aims of the organization. CGWH's mission was to expand the new scholarly field of women's history. Joining the International Federation for Research in Women's History (IFRWH), the members sought to expand the field of women’s history and incorporated in 1989. In 1995, the organization changed its name to the Coordinating Council for Women in History (CCWH), uniting both the lobbying efforts and academic goals of the group.

== Organization ==
The headquarters of the organization is registered as Manhattan, Kansas, and is served by an executive director, two co-presidents, a treasurer, and various committee chairs. They publish the CCWH Newsletter quarterly. The annual meeting is held in conjunction with the annual meeting of the American Historical Association.

== Activities ==
=== Activism ===
CCWH was formed as an activist organization and has remained visible on issues that impact women. It has lobbied against the closure of feminist research centers, against homophobic policies in academia, and in favor of allowing students to participate in collective bargaining. Primary issues continue to be discrimination in job opportunities, including course offerings and publishing.

=== Conferences ===
CCWH organizes conferences to discuss both academic pursuits and discuss faculty status. In addition, panels discuss current events and have included talks on Roe v. Wade, welfare reform, affirmative action, and child care facilities, among others.

=== Scholarships ===
Besides lobbying for legislation to expand pathways for women's studies, women's history, and women's inclusion in the field of history, the organization offered new graduates access to employment and research opportunities by appointing graduate student to its executive board from 1972. From 1988 CCWH began providing graduate funding. Affiliates began offering dissertation prizes and various workshops with practical training, such as job interviewing techniques. Various prizes, such as the Berkshire Graduate Student Fellowship, a dissertation prize for history; the Carol Gold Article Prize; the Catherine Prelinger Memorial Award for non-traditional scholars; the Ida B. Wells Graduate Student Fellowship, dissertation prize for ethnic and gender history; the Nupur Chaudhuri First Article Award; and the Rachel Fuchs award for mentorship of women and the LGBTQI community, are awarded annually to promote scholarship. The group also awards an annual Women's History Day Prize for the participants between the fifth and twelfth grades of the National History Day competition.

== Presidents ==
=== CCWHP/CGWH chairs ===
- 1969–1970: Co-chairs Berenice A. Carroll (CCWHP) of the University of Illinois Urbana-Champaign and Gerda Lerner (CCWHP) of Sarah Lawrence College.
- 1971: Chair Berenice Carroll (CCWHP) of the University of Illinois Urbana-Champaign.
- 1972–1973: Co-chairs

- (CCWHP) Sandi Cooper of Richmond College-CUNY);
- (CGWH, 1972) Adele Simmons of Tufts University;
- (CGWH, 1973) Mollie C. Davis of Queens College, Charlotte.

- 1974–1975: Co-chairs

- (CCWHP) Donna Boutelle of California State University, Long Beach;
- (CGWH) Renate Bridenthal of Brooklyn College-CUNY.

- 1976–1977: Co-chairs

- (CCWHP) Mary Maples Dunn of Bryn Mawr College;
- (CGWH) Hilda L. Smith of the University of Cincinnati.

- 1978–1979: Co-chairs

- (CCWHP) Joan Hoff Wilson of Arizona State University;
- (CGWH, 1978) Hilda L. Smith of the University of Cincinnati;
- (CGWH, 1979) Lois Banner of the University of Scranton.

- 1979–1982: Co-chairs

- (CCWHP) Catherine M. Prelinger of Yale University;
- (CGWH, 1979–1981) Lois Banner of the University of Scranton;
- (CGWH, 1982) Barbara Penny Kanner of University of California, Los Angeles.

- 1983–1986: Co-chairs

- (CCWHP, 1983–1985) Mollie C. Davis of Queens College, Charlotte;
- (CCWHP, 1986) Frances Richardson Keller of San Francisco State University;
- (CGWH, 1983–1984) Barbara Penny Kanner of University of California, Los Angeles;
- (CGWH, 1985–1986) Phyllis Stock-Morton of Seton Hall University.

- 1987–1990: Co-chairs

- (CCWHP, 1987–1988) Frances Richardson Keller of San Francisco State University;
- (CCWHP, 1989–1990) Margaret Strobel of the University of Illinois Chicago;
- (CGWH, 1987) Phyllis Stock-Morton of Seton Hall University;
- (CGWH, 1988–1990) Claire G. Moses of the University of Maryland.

- 1991–1994: Co-chairs

- (CCWHP, 1991) Margaret Strobel of the University of Illinois Chicago;
- (CCWHP, 1992–1995) Mary Elizabeth Perry of Occidental College;
- (CGWH, 1991–1994) Nancy A. Hewitt of the University of South Florida;
- (CGWH, 1995) Judith M. Bennett of the University of North Carolina at Chapel Hill.

=== Coordinating Council for Women in History ===
The organization continues to be run by co-presidents, elected for staggered three-year terms.

- 1996–1997 Judith M. Bennett of the University of North Carolina at Chapel Hill.
- 1996–1998 Nupur Chaudhuri of Kansas State University.
- 1998–2000 Peggy Pascoe of the University of Oregon.
- 1999–2001 June E. Hahner of State University of New York at Albany.
- 2001–2003 Sue Armitage of Washington State University.
- 2002–2004 Janet Afary of Purdue University.
- 2004–2008 Eileen Boris of University of California at Santa Barbara.
- 2005–2007 Cheryl Johnson-Odim of Columbia College Chicago.
- 2007–2010 Carolyn A. Brown of Rutgers University.
- 2009–2011 Kathleen Berkeley of the University of North Carolina Wilmington.
- 2011–2013 Barbara Ramusack of the University of Cincinnati.
- 2012–2015 Susan Wladaver-Morgan of Portland State University.
- 2014–2016 Rachel Ginnis Fuchs of Arizona State University.
- 2017 Mary Ann Villarreal of California State University, Fullerton.
- 2018–2019 Barbara Molony of Santa Clara University.
- 2020 Sasha Turner of Quinnipiac University.
- 2021–2023 Crystal Feimster of Yale University
- 2021–2023 Rachel Jean-Baptiste of University of California, Davis.
