= Turf politics =

Power struggles over territory, resources, and identity within a community

Turf politics (or politics of turf) describes the set political strategies used by coalitions of residents, local governments, and other groups to assert control over a physical and social environment, particularly within a neighborhood (thus another name, neighborhoodism). This place-based activism is using the neighborhood identity to create collective-action frames. The term in this meaning was introduced by Kevin R. Cox in his "Social Change, Turf Politics, and Concepts of Turf Politics" (1984). In a neighborhood context, the "turf" extends beyond property lines to encompass public spaces like parks, streets, and schools, as well as the intangible sense of community character. Turf politics is a part of the broader politics of place (cf. spatial politics, localism).

At its core, turf politics is a manifestation of territoriality, a concept in human geography where individuals and groups either seek to establish defended spaces they perceive as their own to protect their collective consumption from outsiders or mobilize for growth to defend their places against disinvestment.

The term "turf politics" is also used for the bureaucratic organizational politics that lead to turf wars as well as backroom negotiation on distribution of authority during the formation of an executive body.

== Key dimensions ==
The nature of turf defense greatly varies with the type of neighborhood: while affluent places focus on peaceful exclusion of undesirable traits (focusing on "celebration of particular aesthetic characteristics of a locality"), in the poor neighborhood the exclusion of others can be enforced by youth gangs and quite violent ("You’re from the neighbourhood that killed my brother, so I’m gonna kill you").

=== Competition for resources ===
A significant driver of turf politics is the competition for scarce resources, "collective consumption" of valuables like education and physical amenities. This includes tangible assets like parking spaces, municipal services, and access to quality schools, and intangible ones such as a neighborhood's reputation and perceived safety. These conflicts often manifest as Not In My Back Yard (NIMBY) movements, where residents organize to prevent the introduction of land uses they deem undesirable, such as homeless shelters or industrial facilities, which they believe will negatively impact their turf.

=== Identity and belonging ===
Neighborhoods are often central to residents' sense of identity. Turf politics can, therefore, become a struggle over who belongs and who defines the neighborhood's character. Conflicts can arise between long-term residents and newcomers, different ethnic or socioeconomic groups, and renters versus homeowners. These struggles frequently play out in debates over gentrification, historic preservation, and the cultural practices deemed acceptable in public spaces. The negotiation of public behavior can be a form of turf politics, where established norms are defended against perceived outsiders.

=== Informal governance ===
Beyond formal political processes, turf politics operates through informal channels of social control. This can include neighborhood block clubs bargaining for public services with political structures, street-corner gangs warding strangers off their "turf", informal groups putting social pressure on individuals who violate community norms. As a result, "defended neighborhoods" are socially constructed and maintained through informal turf politics that regulate the social order outside of official government channels.

== See also ==
- Barrioization
- Localism (politics)

== Sources ==
- Clarke, N (2013). "Locality and localism: A view from British Human Geography" (PDF). Policy Studies. 34 (5–6): 492–507.
- Cox, Kevin R. (2017-10-12) [1984]. "Social Change, Turf Politics, and Concepts of Turf Politics". Public Service Provision and Urban Development. Routledge. doi:10.4324/9781315168777-12. ISBN 978-1-315-16877-7.
- Cox, Kevin R. (1989). "The politics of turf and the question of class". In Wolch, Jennifer; Dear, Michael (eds.). The Power of Geography: How Territory Shapes Social Life. Routledge. pp. 61–90. ISBN 9781315819457.
- DeSena, Judith (2005-02-22). Protecting One's Turf. Bloomsbury Publishing PLC. ISBN 0-7618-2981-4.
- Henderson, Lyn (1992). More than rates, roads and rubbish: a history of local government in action in Thuringowa Shire 1879-1985 (PhD thesis). Vol. 2. James Cook University.
- Martin, Deborah G. (2003). ""Place-Framing" as Place-Making: Constituting a Neighborhood for Organizing and Activism". Annals of the Association of American Geographers. 93 (3): 730–750. doi:10.1111/1467-8306.9303011. ISSN 0004-5608. JSTOR 1515505.
- May, Jon (1996). "Globalization and the Politics of Place: Place and Identity in an Inner London Neighbourhood". Transactions of the Institute of British Geographers. 21 (1). [Royal Geographical Society (with the Institute of British Geographers), Wiley]: 194–215. ISSN 0020-2754. JSTOR 622933.
- Mnatsakanyan, Armen (2020). The Coherence of EU Crisis Management in the Eastern Neighborhood: The Case of South Ossetia (PDF). Dipartimento di Scienze Politiche (Doctor of Philosophy in Political Studies thesis). Sapienza Università di Roma.
- Saberi, Parastou (January 2017). The 'Paris Problem' in Toronto: The state, space, and the political fear of 'the immigrant' (PhD thesis). Toronto, Ontario: York University.
- Staeheli, Lynn A. (2003-02-24). "Place". In Agnew, John A.; Mitchell, Katharyne; Toal, Gerard (eds.). A Companion to Political Geography (PDF). Malden, MA: Wiley-Blackwell. pp. 158–170. ISBN 0-631-22031-3.
- Suttles, Gerald D. (1972). The Social Construction of Communities. University of Chicago Press. ISBN 0-226-78189-5.
- van Dorp, Erik-Jan; Rhodes, R. A. W. (2025-01-23). "Executive Politics in the Netherlands". The Oxford Handbook of Dutch Politics. Oxford University Press. pp. 140–156. doi:10.1093/oxfordhb/9780198875499.013.9. ISBN 978-0-19-887549-9.
