= Laura F. Edwards =

American historian

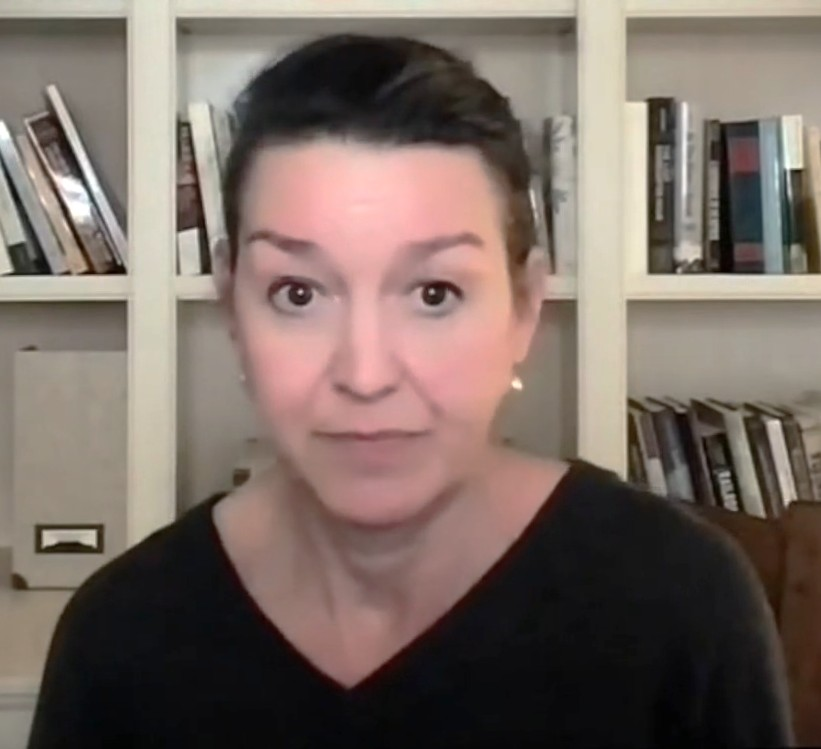
- Edwards in 2022

President of the Southern Historical Association
- Incumbent
- Assumed office 2026
- Preceded by: Lorri Glover

President of the Southern Association for Women Historians
- In office 2008–2009
- Preceded by: Cynthia A. Kierner
- Succeeded by: Melissa Walker

Personal details
- Occupation: Historian
- Awards: Guggenheim Fellowship (2012); Merle Curti Award for Social History (2023)

Academic background
- Education: Northwestern University (BA); University of North Carolina at Chapel Hill (MA and PhD)
- Thesis: The politics of manhood and womanhood: reconstruction in Granville County, North Carolina (1991)

Academic work
- Sub-discipline: 19th-century United States history
- Institutions: University of South Florida; University of California, Los Angeles; Duke University; Princeton University

Laura F. Edwards is an American historian. She has authored five books on U.S. history: Gendered Strife and Confusion (1997), Scarlett Doesn't Live Here Anymore (2000), The People and their Peace (2009), A Legal History of the Civil War and Reconstruction (2015), and Only the Clothes on Her Back (2022).

Originally an oboist as a student, she became interested in history during high school. After obtaining a PhD at the University of North Carolina at Chapel Hill, she became a professor at the University of South Florida, University of California, Los Angeles, and Duke University, before becoming Class of 1921 Bicentennial Professor of the History of American Law and Liberty at Princeton University. She is a 2012 Guggenheim Fellow and has won several awards for her work, including the 2023 Merle Curti Award for Social History. She has served as president of the Southern Association for Women Historians (2008) and the Southern Historical Association (2026).

== Early life ==
Edwards, an only child, was born to Sandra (née Rennich) and Robert Edwards. Both her father and maternal grandfather George Rennich worked at Oak Ridge National Laboratory, the latter a chemical engineer. Raised in Oak Ridge, Tennessee, she attended Oak Ridge High School. She was an oboist as a student, and her determination to become a musician sent her to the Interlochen Arts Academy for her sophomore and junior years, a decision she said "actually diverted [her] away from music". After returning to Tennessee, she played as an oboist for both ORHS' orchestra and the Oak Ridge Symphony Orchestra, and graduated from the school in 1982.

During her senior year, Edwards became interested in history after taking AP European History and AP United States History and setting up an independent study with her teacher in the former course. After obtaining a BA in American Culture from Northwestern University, she moved to the University of North Carolina at Chapel Hill, where she obtained an MA and PhD (both in history) in 1987 and 1991, respectively. Her doctoral dissertation was The politics of manhood and womanhood: reconstruction in Granville County, North Carolina. Around this time, she worked at the Newberry Library as an administrative assistant at their Family and Community History Center (1990–1992).

== Career ==
After holding a visiting assistant professor position at the University of Chicago since 1992, Edwards joined the University of South Florida as an assistant professor of history in 1993. She moved to the University of California, Los Angeles in 1997 and was promoted to associate professor in 2000 before leaving in 2001 to join the Duke University faculty. In 2005, she was promoted to full professor, and in 2014, she was appointed Peabody Family Professor of History and Gender, Sexuality and Feminist Studies. In 2021, she joined Princeton University as Class of 1921 Bicentennial Professor of the History of American Law and Liberty. She was a 2023-2024 Princeton Humanities Council Old Dominion Research Professor. In July 2026, she became director of Princeton's Society of Fellows in the Liberal Arts. She teaches both undergraduate and graduate courses on American legal history.

Edwards specializes in 19th-century United States history, including in law and women, and she has written five books. She initially won the Journal of Southern History's 2000 Fletcher M. Green and Charles W. Ramsdell Award for her article "Law, Domestic Violence, and the Limits of Patriarchal Authority in the Antebellum South". She won the American Historical Association's 2009 Littleton-Griswold Prize and the Southern Historical Association's 2010 Charles S. Sydnor Award for her 2009 book The People and Their Peace: Legal Culture and the Transformation of Inequality in the Post-Revolutionary South. In 2012, she was awarded a Guggenheim Fellowship in Law. Another book, Only the Clothes on Her Back (2022), won several awards: the 2022 Society for the History of the Early Republic Best Book Prize, the 2023 American Society for Legal History John Phillip Reid Prize, and the 2023 Merle Curti Award for Social History. She is also author of Gendered Strife and Confusion: The Political Culture of Reconstruction (1997), Scarlett Doesn't Live Here Anymore: Southern Women in the Civil War Era (2001), and A Legal History of the Civil War and Reconstruction: A Nation of Rights (2015), and she was an associate editor for A New History of the American South (2023).

Edwards served as president of the Southern Association for Women Historians in 2008. She was named president of the Southern Historical Association in 2026.

== Works ==
- Gendered Strife and Confusion: The Political Culture of Reconstruction (1997) (Note: Reviews of this book:)
- Scarlett Doesn't Live Here Anymore: Southern Women in the Civil War Era (2000) (Note: Reviews of this book:)
- The People and their Peace: Legal Culture and the Transformation of Inequality in the Post-Revolutionary South (2009) (Note: Reviews of this book:)
- A Legal History of the Civil War and Reconstruction: A Nation of Rights (2015) (Note: Reviews of this book:)
- Only the Clothes on Her Back (2022)
