= Jefferson: Architect of American Liberty =

2017 book by John B. Boles

- Author: John B. Boles
- Publisher: Basic Books
- Publication date: 2017

Jefferson: Architect of American Liberty is a 2017 biography of Thomas Jefferson by historian John B. Boles.

== Bibliography ==
- Campbell, Randolph B. (2019). "Review of Jefferson: Architect of American Liberty". The Southwestern Historical Quarterly. 123 (1): 120–121. ISSN 0038-478X. JSTOR 26745583.
- Donoghue, Steve (May 25, 2017). "'Jefferson' is a complex, balanced account of the Founding Father". Christian Science Monitor. ISSN 0882-7729.
- Hayes, Kevin J. (2018). "Review of Jefferson: Architect of American Liberty". The Journal of American History. 104 (4): 1002. doi:10.1093/jahist/jax444. ISSN 0021-8723. JSTOR 48549093.
- McGarvie, Mark (2018). "Review of Jefferson: Architect of American Liberty, Boles John B.". The Journal of Southern History. 84 (3): 714–715. ISSN 0022-4642. JSTOR 26536307.
- Sehat, David (2017). "Thomas Jefferson and Us". The William and Mary Quarterly. 74 (4): 771–776. doi:10.5309/willmaryquar.74.4.0771. ISSN 0043-5597. JSTOR 10.5309/willmaryquar.74.4.0771.
- Yardley, Jonathan (May 12, 2017). "The complex Thomas Jefferson in his place and time". The Washington Post.
