= Robert M. Beachy =

American historian

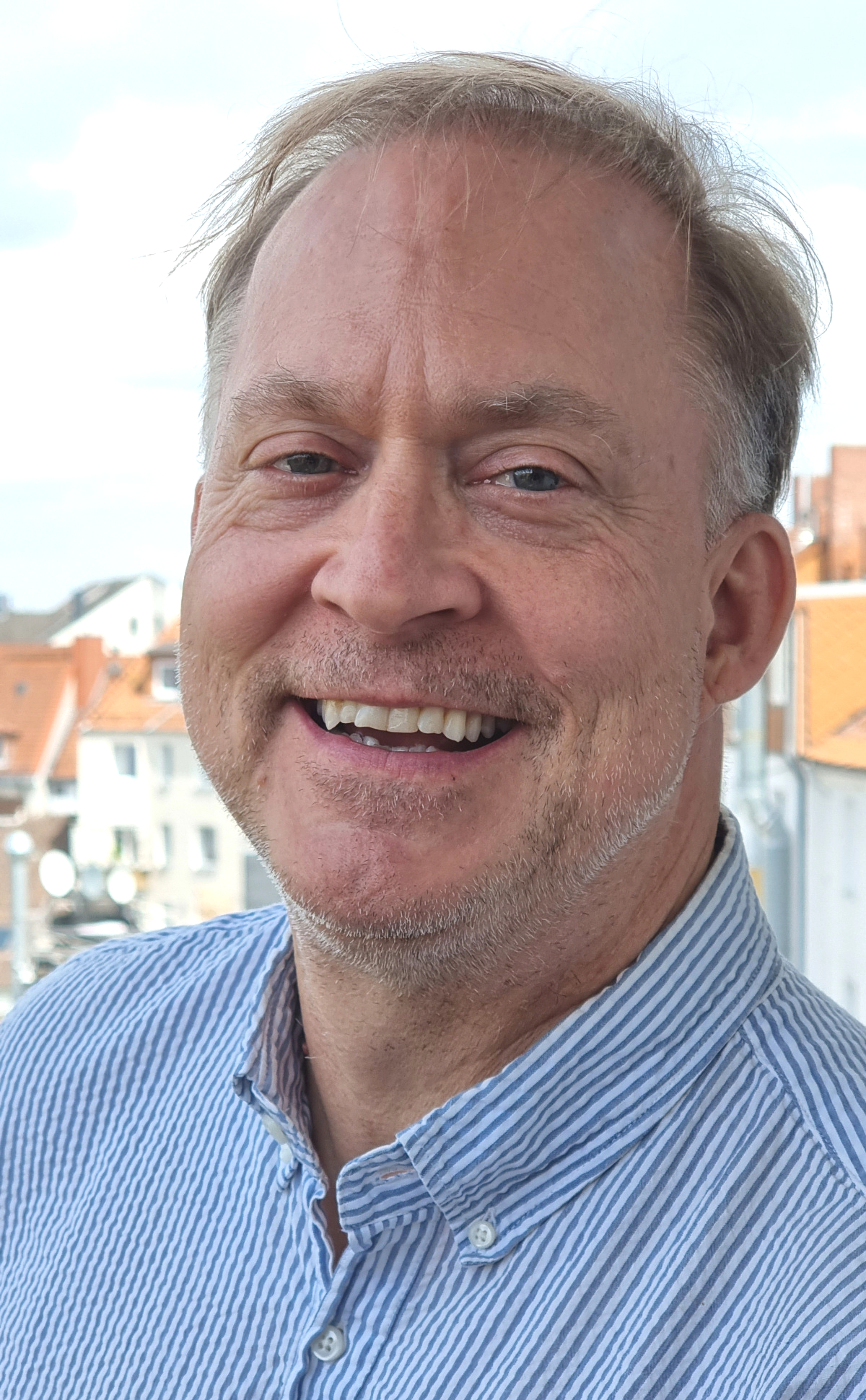
Robert M. Beachy in July 2023

Robert Beachy (born in Aibonito, Puerto Rico) is associate professor of history at the Underwood International College at Yonsei University in Seoul, South Korea. He was raised in Mennonite communities in Puerto Rico and Indiana. He formerly taught at Goucher College in Baltimore, Maryland.

== Career ==
Beachy specializes in the intellectual and cultural history of Germany and Europe, and is known for his work on the history of sexuality in the Weimar Republic, under the Nazis, and in Germany after the Second World War. He received his Ph.D. from the University of Chicago in 1998; his M.A. in History from the University of Chicago in 1989; and, his B.A. in History from Earlham College, 1988.

In 2009, Beachy was named a fellow of the John Simon Guggenheim Memorial Foundation for his research on homosexuality in Nazi Germany. Beachy's work also has received support from the Huntington Library, the National Humanities Center, the Max Planck Institute for History, the Herzog August Bibliothek in Wolfenbüttel, the German Academic Exchange Service (DAAD) and the American Philosophical Society.

In 2015, his work "Gay Berlin: Birthplace of a Modern Identity" was named a Stonewall Honor Book in Non-Fiction by the American Library Association.

== Works ==
- Internal Enemies: Germany and the Persecution of Sexual Minorities, 1933-1969 (forthcoming W. W. Norton)
- Gay Berlin: Birthplace of a Modern Identity (Alfred A. Knopf 2014).
- "The German Invention of Homosexuality," The Journal of Modern History, Vol. 82, No. 4 (Dec. 2010), pp. 801–38.
- Pious Pursuits: German Moravians in the Atlantic World, ed. with Michele Gillespie (Berghahn 2007)
- Who Ran the Cities? Elite and Urban Power Structures, 1700–2000, ed. with Ralf Roth (Ashgate 2007)
- The Soul of Commerce: Credit, Property and Politics in Leipzig, 1750–1840 (Brill 2005)
- Women Business & Finance in Nineteenth Century Europe: Rethinking Separate Spheres, ed. with Beatrice Craig & Alastair Owens (Berg 2005)

== Awards, grants, and fellowships ==
- Best non-fiction work in LGBTQ literature, for "Gay Berlin," Randy Shilts Award, 2015.
- Spirit of Stonewall, for "Gay Berlin," Berlin Gay Pride Parade Association.
- Best Article in European History, Higby Prize of the American Historical Association.
- Non-fiction honor book, for "Gay Berlin," Stonewall Book Awards of the American Library Association.
- John S. Guggenheim Memorial Foundation Fellowship
- National Humanities Center, residential fellowship.
- Center for the Advanced Study of Behavioral Sciences, Stanford University, residential fellowship.
- American Philosophical Society
- The Huntington Library
- The German Academic Exchange Service
- The Max Planck Institute for the Study of History
- The Goethe Institute
