= Mollie C. Davis =

American activist and academic (1932–2021)

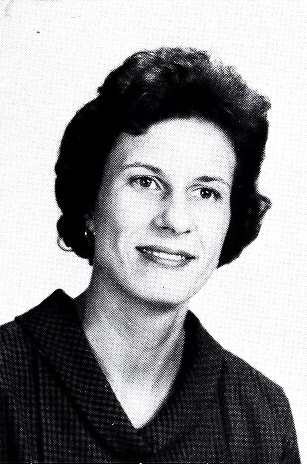
- Davis in 1967
- Born: Mollie Farmer Camp; March 2, 1932; Newnan, Georgia, U.S.
- Died: January 4, 2021 (aged 88); Charlotte, North Carolina, U.S.
- Other names: Mollie Davis, Mollie Camp Davis
- Occupations: academic, civil and women's rights activist
- Years active: 1965–2000

Mollie C. Davis (March 2, 1932 – January 4, 2021) was an American activist and academic. She was active in both the Civil Rights Movement and the Women's liberation movement of the 1960s and 1970s. Her activism led her into the push to develop women's studies programs. She was one of the founders of the Southern Caucus of Women in History, later known as the Southern Association for Women Historians, in 1970, serving as its president from 1971 to 1973. In 1973, she served as co-chair of the Conference Group on Women's History and from 1983 to 1985 was co-chair of the Coordinating Committee on Women in the Historical Profession, both of the precursor organizations of the Coordinating Council for Women in History. Davis was on the executive council of the Southern History Association from 1992 through 1994.

== Early life and education ==
Mollie Farmer Camp was born on March 2, 1932, in Newnan, Georgia, to Sarah (née Farmer) and Albert Sidney Camp. Her mother was an invalid and Camp had polio as a child. Her father served as the Georgia state Representative for the United States House from 1939 to 1954. Her mother was related to former governor of Georgia Ellis Arnall. The family lived in the former boarding house run by Camp's grandmother, who assisted the family because of Camp's mother's incapacity. Because Georgia law forbade Camp's widowed grandmother to write her own checks, she ardently pressed Camp to always vote and be politically active. Camp's childhood was spent between Georgia and Washington, D.C., where she spent many hours in the Library of Congress. Because of her disabilities from polio, she decided to go into teaching, because it was a field that did not require physical strength.

After finishing high school, Camp first studied at Stratford College and went on to earn a Bachelor of Arts degree in history and political science at Hollins College, a women's university in Virginia. On 23 September 1954, Camp married William Elwyn Davis, who was also from Newnan. Davis got a Ford Foundation grant to continue her education and was involved in the programs to desegregate the Atlanta school system in 1962 and 1963. She began taking master's classes at Emory University, but because she had young children to care for, did not earn her Master of Arts in Teaching until 1965. Part of the requirement to earn her degree was to complete an internship, teaching in the newly integrated schools in Atlanta in 1965.

== Career ==
In 1965, Davis began teaching at West Georgia College in Carrollton. To be hired, she had to sign an oath that neither she nor members of her family were members of the ACLU or NAACP and though she signed them, she secretly joined the class action lawsuit to have these types of oaths nullified in the state. She also helped found the first ACLU chapter at West Georgia College in 1966 and was involved in monitoring compliance with the registration provisions of the Voting Rights Act of 1965. While doing this work, her car was blown up, and she believed that it had been bombed by the Ku Klux Klan. Davis wanted to continue her education at Emory, but her grades were not high enough. By the time they decided to admit her, friends of her father on the board of the University of Georgia (UGA) had invited her to become the first woman given a regent's grant to complete PhD studies.

Davis was admitted to UGA in 1967 and studied there until 1969, before returning to West Georgia College to complete her prerequisite teaching for the 1969–1970 term. While she was teaching in 1969, Davis realized that the Equal Pay Act of 1963 did not include equitable pay for professional people and that she was making $1,200 per month less than her male colleagues with similar education. During her semester break in 1969, Davis went to Washington to protest and while there became involved in the Anti-Vietnam War protests. Though she did not intend to attend the American Historical Association's annual meeting while she was in Washington, she did and learned of the forming of the Coordinating Committee on Women in the Historical Profession. The group was founded in December 1969, and among its concerns were discriminatory hiring practices.

Davis immediately joined the group and returned to Georgia with plans to form a women's organization within the Southern Historical Association. The Caucus of Women in History was founded by Davis and others in 1970 and she served as its president between 1971 and 1973. The group later changed its name to the Southern Association for Women Historians. Davis completed her degree in American Studies, under the tutelage of Willard B. Gatewood in 1972. Her husband had been admitted to Gracewood Mental Hospital in Augusta in 1970. Davis discovered that because of remnants of coverture laws in the South, she could not accept a position at state-funded schools located outside of Georgia because her legal residence was his, in Augusta. She filed for divorce and began using a network the American Historical Association had set up to help women historians find jobs in academia.

In 1972, Davis was hired as an assistant professor at Queen's College of Charlotte, North Carolina earning almost double her salary in Georgia. In 1973, she became one of two chairs of the Conference Group on Women's History and from 1983 to 1985 was co-chair of the Coordinating Committee on Women in the Historical Profession. Throughout the 1980s, Davis served on numerous committees of the Southern Historical Association, including membership, nominating, and program committees. Much of her work on the various committees was devoted to including women as presenters or officers of the association, or having a space dedicated for them to meet various conferences. From 1992 to 1994, she was elected to serve on the executive council of the Southern Historical Association and was on the executive committee from 1993 to 1994. During her tenure as chair of the women's committee in 1999, Davis pressed for the association to adopt an ethics policy to specifically address the issue of sexual harassment. Davis retired in 2000.

== Death and legacy ==
Davis died in Charlotte, North Carolina, on January 4, 2021. She is remembered for activism in the civil rights and women's movement, as well as her founding role in the Southern Association for Women Historians. Her work with the other founders Rosemary F. Carroll, Arnita A. Jones, and Barbara Brandon Schnorrenberg, is credited with laying the groundwork of the organization, which would become regionally influential.

== Selected works ==
Davis researched social reform movements from a gender perspective, evaluating how women's roles had changed over time. She was particularly interested in how women's relationships in family and with their children were depicted in popular culture.

- Davis, Mollie Camp (1971). "George Whitefield's Attempt to Establish a College in Georgia". Georgia Historical Quarterly. 55. Savannah, Georgia: Georgia Historical Society: 459–470. ISSN 0016-8297.
- Davis, Mollie C. (Winter 1971). "American Religious and Religiose Reaction To Mexico's Church-State Conflict, 1926–1927: Background to the Morrow Mission". Journal of Church and State. 13 (1). Waco, Texas: J.M Dawson Institute of Church-State Studies: 79–96. doi:10.1093/jcs/13.1.79. ISSN 0021-969X. OCLC 5792703746.
- Davis, Mollie Camp (1972). Quest for a New America: Ferment in Collegiate Culture, 1921–1929 (PhD). Athens, Georgia: University of Georgia. OCLC 17652974.
- Davis, Mollie C. (Winter 1978). "Grass Roots Women's Studies: Piedmont, North Carolina". Women's Studies Newsletter. 6 (1). Old Westbury, New York: Feminist Press: 22–25. ISSN 0363-1133. JSTOR 40042420. OCLC 5547235348.
- Davis, Mollie C. (1982). "The Countess of Huntingdon: A Leader in Missions for Social and Religious Reform". In Keller, Rosemary Skinner; Queen, Louise L.; Thomas, Hilah F. (eds.). Women in New Worlds: Historical Perspectives on the Wesleyan Tradition. Vol. II. Nashville, Tennessee: Abingdon. pp. 162–175. ISBN 978-0-687-45969-8.
