= Jacqueline Anne Rouse =

American scholar

Jacqueline Anne Rouse (1950-2020) was an American scholar of African American women’s history. She is most widely known for her work on Southern black women and their activism from the turn of the twentieth century to the Civil Rights Movement.

== Biography ==
Jacqueline A. Rouse earned a B.A. from Howard University in 1972 and an M.A. from Atlanta University in 1973. She then went on to doctoral study at Emory University, where she wrote a dissertation titled "Lugenia D. Burns Hope: A Black Female Reformer in the South, 1871-1947" under the direction of Dr. Darlene Rebecca Roth. Rouse completed her Ph.D. in 1983. She became a professor in the history department at Georgia State University in 1991, where she taught courses on African American history, black studies, and women’s studies.

Rouse published numerous books and articles on black women activists. Her first book was a biography of Lugenia Burns Hope, published in 1989 and titled Lugenia Burns Hope, Black Southern Reformer. She co-edited a 1990 volume titled Women in the Civil Rights Movement: Trailblazers and Torchbearers, 1941-1965. In a review of the book published in the journal Gender & Society, Paulette Pierce called Women in the Civil Rights Movement a "long-awaited correction to the masculinist bias that has systematically distorted our understanding of the Black movement."

Rouse was a member of the Association of Black Women Historians for over 30 years and served as the organization's National Director in the mid-1990s. She was the president of the Association of Social and Behavioral Scientists in 1991-1992. She has also served as president of the Southern Association for Women Historians.

Rouse was the recipient of many awards for her scholarship and service to the profession, including the Southern Regional Educational Board's Faculty Mentor of the Year (2007), the Governor's Humanities Award (2002), and the Lorraine Williams Leadership Award from the Association of Black Women Historians (2012). In March 2015, Rouse was among the group of scholars who were honored at an event called "BWHxG: Cross-Generational Dialogues in Black Women’s History" at Michigan State University. The event was described as a "living legends tribute" honoring eleven black women historians who have trained and mentored generations of students. Her former colleagues and advisees remember her as an advocate and mentor with "few equals."

Rouse died on May 12, 2020, at the age of 70.

== Publications ==
=== Books authored ===
- Rouse, Jacqueline Anne (1989). Lugenia Burns Hope, Black Southern Reformer. Athens, GA: University of Georgia Press. ISBN 0820314641.

=== Books edited and advised ===
- Crawford, Vicki L.; Rouse, Jacqueline Anne; Woods, Barbara (1993) [orig. pub. by Brooklyn: Carson, 1990]. Women in the Civil Rights Movement: Trailblazers and Torchbearers, 1941-1965. Bloomington: Indiana University Press. ISBN 0253208327.
- Schneider, Richard C. (Ed.). African American History in the Press, 1851-1899 (Vol. 1). Detroit: Gale, 1996. ISBN 0810395568.

=== Articles, book chapters, encyclopedia entries, and book reviews ===
- Rouse, Jacqueline A. (1991). "Atlanta's African-American Women's Attack on Segregation, 1900-1920". In Frankel, Noralee; Dye, Nancy S. (eds.). Gender, Class, Race, and Reform in the Progressive Era. Lexington: University Press of Kentucky. pp. 10–23. ISBN 0813108411.
- Rouse, Jacqueline A. (1996). [Review of All Is Never Said: The Narrative of Odette Harper Hines, by Judith Rollins.] Journal of Southern History, 62(4), 839-840.
- Rouse, Jacqueline Anne (1996). "Out of the Shadow of Tuskegee: Margaret Murray Washington, Social Activism, and Race Vindication". Journal of Negro History. 81 (1/4): 31–46. doi:10.1086/JNHv81n1-4p31. S2CID 141354406.
- Rouse, Jacqueline (1996). Freedom's Light [Review of I've Got the Light of Freedom: The Organizing Tradition and the Mississippi Freedom Struggle, by Charles M. Payne.] Southern Changes, 18(1), 15-16.
- Rouse, Jacqueline Anne (1999). "The Atlanta Neighborhood Union, 1908-1924". In Escott, Paul D.; Goldfield, David R.; McMillen, Sally Gregory; Turner, Elizabeth Hayes (eds.). Major Problems in the History of the American South: Volume 2, The New South. Boston: Houghton Mifflin. ISBN 978-0-395-87140-9.
- Rouse, Jacqueline A. (2001). "'We Seek to Know . . . in Order to Speak the Truth': Nurturing the Seeds of Discontent--Septima P. Clark and Participatory Leadership." In Sisters in the Struggle: African American Women in the Civil Rights Black Power Movement, edited by Bettye Collier-Thomas and V.P. Franklin, 95-120. New York: New York University Press. ISBN 0814716024.
- Rouse, Jacqueline A. (2004). "Clarke, Septima Poinsette.". In Ware, Susan (ed.). Notable American Women: A Biographical Dictionary Completing the Twentieth Century. Cambridge: Harvard University Press. pp. 126–128. ISBN 067401488X.
- Rouse, Jacqueline A. (2017). "Remembering Alton Parker Hornsby, Jr., 1940-2017." Journal of African American History, 102(4), 574-577.
