= Jack T. Kirby =

American historian (1938–2009)

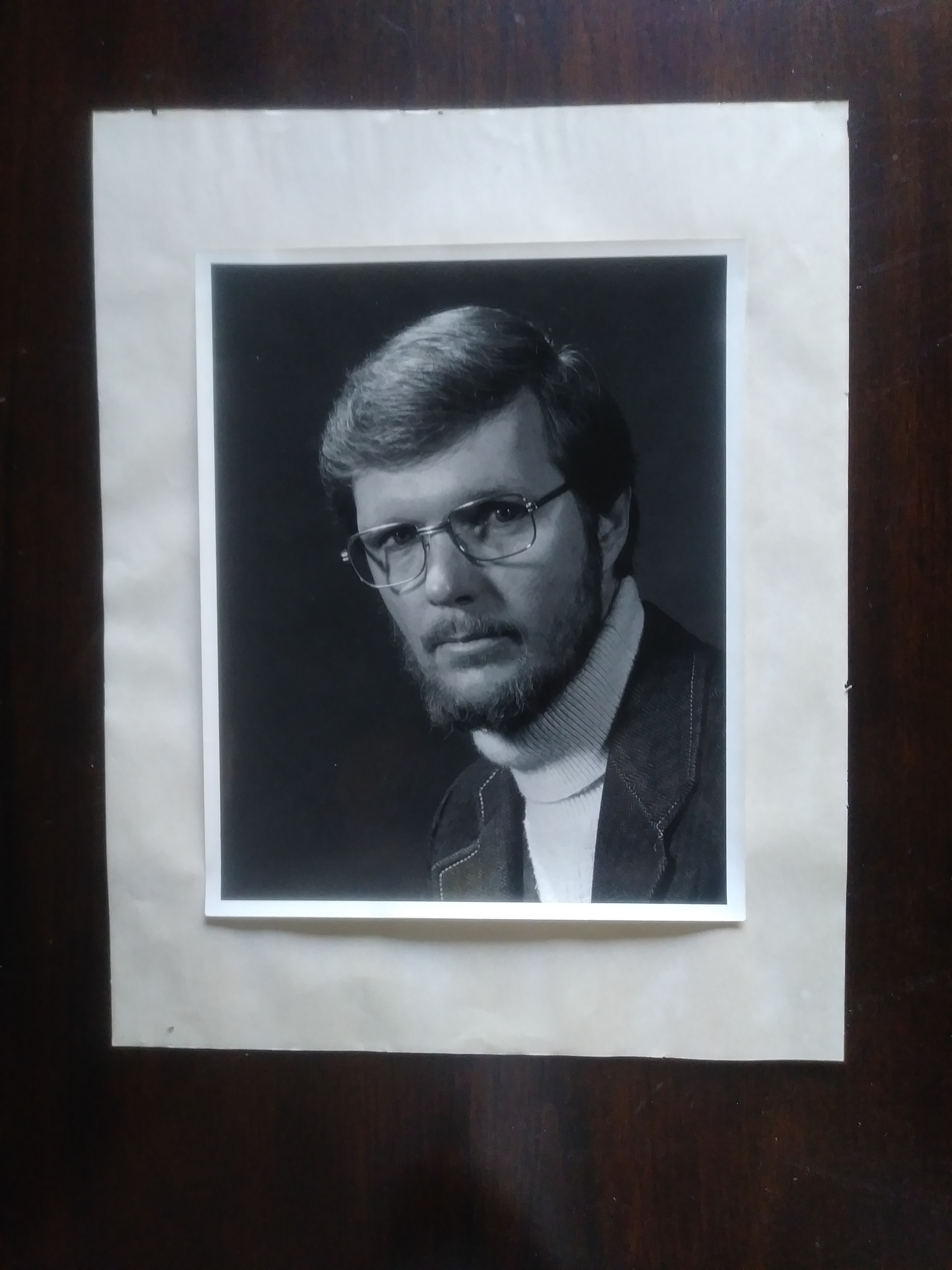
- Jack T. Kirby circa 1963
- Born: August 22, 1938; Portsmouth, Virginia
- Died: August 6, 2009 (aged 70); St. Augustine, Florida
- Occupation: Historian
- Awards: Bancroft Prize (2007)

Academic background
- Education: Old Dominion University (BA 1963); University of Virginia (MA 1964; PhD 1965)

Academic work
- Discipline: Historian
- Sub-discipline: History of the Southern United States
- Institutions: Miami University (1965–2002)

Jack Temple Kirby (August 22, 1938 – August 6, 2009) was an American historian who wrote about the Southern United States and the persistent stereotyping of Southerners. He was awarded the Bancroft Prize for his 2006 book Mockingbird Song: Ecological Landscapes of the South. He was a named chair professor of history at Miami University 1965–2002, president of the Agricultural History Society 1995–1996, and president of the Southern Historical Association at the time of his death.

== Early life and education ==
Kirby was born on August 22, 1938, in Portsmouth, Virginia, his ancestors having immigrated to the South in the 17th century, by family tradition. Throughout his college education he majored in history, earning his bachelor's degree at Old Dominion University in 1963 after a few years in the US Army and then attending the University of Virginia, where he was awarded a master's degree (1964) and a doctorate (1965) in history. His dissertation was on Virginia Governor Westmoreland Davis, advised by Edward Younger.

== Career ==
Kirby was hired in 1965 to serve on the faculty of Miami University, where he was professor of history until his retirement in 2002. He rose to the named chair the W.E. Smith Professor of History in 1988. He also served as president of the Agricultural History Society (1995–1996) and was serving as president of the Southern Historical Association at his death.

In his published works — he authored or edited seven books — Kirby tried to dispel the sweeping generalizations of Southerners from books that he felt were aimed at "making Northern white folks feel good about themselves by telling the same story over and over again about the South". His 1978 book Media-Made Dixie took issue with the portrayal of Southerners using "clichés of racists, graceful landed gentry, poverty, homespun rural values, stock-car racers and moonshiners". Rather than focusing on the South as it really exists, the books show depictions from the dawn of the cinema and the creation of best seller lists, starting at D. W. Griffith's The Birth of a Nation.

His 2006 book Mockingbird Song: Ecological Landscapes of the South, published by the University of North Carolina Press was awarded the Bancroft Prize in 2007 by jurors at Columbia University as a book that is set in the South but has far greater reach and speaks "profoundly on the relationships of Americans — and of humankind — to the natural world," and it also won the 2007 Bennett H. Wall Award of the Southern Historical Association.

== Personal life ==
Kirby relocated to St. Augustine, Florida following his retirement from Miami University.

He died at age 70 of heart failure on August 6, 2009, in St. Augustine. He was survived by Dr. Constance Pierce, an English professor at Miami University who was Kirby's companion for 17 years, as well as by a daughter, a son and two grandchildren. His first marriage, to Ann Bulleit in the late 1960s, ended with divorce in the early 1990s.
