= Claire Moses =

American feminist historian (born 1941)

Claire Goldberg Moses
- Born: 1941 (age 84–85); Hartford, Connecticut
- Known for: French Feminism in the Nineteenth Century; Founding women's studies at University of Maryland; Editorial Director of Feminist Studies
- Awards: Joan Kelly Prize (1985) for the Best Book in Feminist Theory and History

Academic background
- Education: Smith College (A.B., 1963); George Washington University (M.Phil., 1972; Ph.D., 1978)

Academic work
- Discipline: Women's studies, history
- Sub-discipline: Feminist theory, social Movements, French women’s and feminist history
- Institutions: University of Maryland, College Park

Claire Goldberg Moses (born 1941) is an American historian and women's studies scholar who is Professor Emerita at the University of Maryland, College Park. She was a founding faculty member of the university's women's studies program in 1977 and served as Editorial Director of Feminist Studies from 1977 to 2011. Her book French Feminism in the Nineteenth Century won the Joan Kelly Prize for the Best Book in Feminist Theory and History from the American Historical Association in 1985. The Claire G. Moses Award for the Most Theoretically Innovative Article was established by Feminist Studies in her honor.

== Early life and education ==
Moses was born in 1941 in Hartford, Connecticut. She graduated from Frederick U. Conard High School in West Hartford in 1959. She received her A.B. from Smith College, Magna cum Laude, Phi Beta Kappa, in 1963. She then pursued graduate studies at Columbia University and George Washington University, earning her M.Phil. in 1972 and her Ph.D. in 1978.

== Career ==
=== University of Maryland ===
Moses was the first faculty member hired in Women's Studies at the University of Maryland, College Park in 1977, where she developed and taught the program's first interdisciplinary courses. She served as chair of women studies from 1993 to 2003, during which time she oversaw its reorganization from a program into a full academic department. Under her leadership, the department gained approval to offer Bachelor of Arts, Master of Arts, and Ph.D. degrees.

Her research specializations include feminist theory, the history of feminist movements in France, the United States, and internationally; the history of European women; colonialism; and the political economy of globalization.

=== Editorial work ===
From 1977 to 2011, Moses served as Editorial Director of Feminist Studies, one of the premier academic journals in women's studies. In recognition of her contributions to feminist scholarship, the journal established the Claire G. Moses Award for the Most Theoretically Innovative Article in her honor.

=== The National Women's Studies Association, WOWS, and the Feminist Knowledge Network ===
Moses has been active in numerous professional women's studies organizations. She was one of the founding organizers of the Program Directors and Administrators group within the National Women's Studies Association, helping to establish standards and practices for the discipline across the United States. At the Women’s World Conference in Beijing in 1995, with representatives from Australia, Canada, and France, she co-founded the Worldwide Association of Women's Studies (WOWS), eventually representing 53 countries, and organizing conferences every 5 years, each on a different continent. She also organized (with Canadian Marilyn Porter) the Feminist Knowledge Network of women's studies journals from more than 20 countries.

== Selected publications ==
Moses is best known for her book French Feminism in the Nineteenth Century, published by SUNY Press in 1984. This work, which examines the development of feminist thought and activism in 19th-century France, won the prestigious Joan Kelly Prize for the Best Book in Feminist Theory and History.

=== Major publications ===
- French Feminism in the Nineteenth Century. Albany: SUNY Press, 1984.
- Feminism, Socialism, and French Romanticism (with Leslie W. Rabine). Bloomington: Indiana University Press, 1993.
- U.S. Women in Collective Struggle: A Feminist Studies Anthology (with Heidi Hartmann). Urbana: University of Illinois Press, 1995.

=== Selected articles ===
- Moses, C. G. (1982). Saint-Simonian Men/Saint-Simonian Women: The Transformation of Feminist Thought in 1830s' France. The Journal of Modern History, 54(2), 240-267. doi:10.1086/244133
- Moses, C. G. (1998). Made in America: "French Feminism" in Academia. Feminist Studies, 24(2), 241-274. The article appeared in French translation as "La construction du 'French Feminism' dans le discours universitaire américain" in Nouvelles Questions Féministes 17, no. 1 (1996): 3-14, and was reprinted in Australian Feminist Studies 11 (1996). The article was later included in two major edited collections: in French translation in Le Cinquantenaire du Deuxième Sexe, edited by Christine Delphy and Sylvie Chaperon (Paris: Éditions Syllepse, 2002), 238-245; and in English in Beyond French Feminisms: Debates on Women, Politics, and Culture in France, 1981-2001, edited by Roger Célestin, Eliane DalMolin, and Isabelle de Courtivron (New York: Palgrave Macmillan, 2003), 261-284.
- Moses, C. G. (2009). The Politics of Feminist Publishing. Feminist studies. Ex aequo, (19), 15-21.
- Moses, C. G. (2012). " What's in a Name?" On Writing the History of Feminism. Feminist Studies, 38(3), 757-779. doi:10.1353/fem.2012.0060
- Moses, C. G. (2013). French Utopians: The Word and the Act. In Perspectives on Feminist Political Thought in European History (pp. 136–149). Routledge.

== Awards and honors ==
- Joan Kelly Prize for the Best Book in Feminist Theory and History, American Historical Association (1985)
- University of Maryland Outstanding Woman of the Year (2003)
- Claire G. Moses Award for the Most Theoretically Innovative Article established by Feminist Studies in her honor
