= Donna Boutelle =

American historian (1931–2008)

- Donna Boutelle, from a 1955 newspaper
- Born: October 8, 1931; Sioux City, Iowa, U.S.
- Died: January 17, 2008 (aged 76); Santa Rosa, California, U.S.
- Occupations: Historian, college professor

Donna Lee Boutelle (October 8, 1931 – January 17, 2008) was an American medieval historian and college professor. She was a professor of history at California State University, Long Beach (CSULB), president of the West Coast Association of Women Historians from 1972 to 1973, and co-chair of the Coordinating Committee on Women in the Historical Profession from 1974 to 1975.

== Early life and education ==
Boutelle was born in Sioux City, Iowa, the daughter of Jeanette Allison Milton, a photographer. She attended Sequoia High School in Redwood City, California, Santa Rosa Junior College, and the University of California, Berkeley. She earned an associate degree at Santa Rosa in 1953, completed WAC training at Fort McClellan in 1955, earned a bachelor's degree at Berkeley in 1960, a master's degree in history in 1962, and a PhD in history in 1970, with a dissertation titled "Louis the Pious and Ermoldus Nigellus: An Inquiry Into the Historical Reliability of In Honorem Hludowici".

== Career ==
In the 1950s and 1960s, Boutelle was a psychiatric technician at the Sonoma State Hospital. For over forty years, Boutelle was a history professor on the faculty at California State University, Long Beach. She achieved full professor status in 1978. She specialized in the early Middle Ages, and was associate vice-president for academic affairs at CSULB. She taught in New Zealand on an exchange program. She retired in 2004.

Boutelle was president of the West Coast Association of Women Historians from 1972 to 1973, and co-chair of the Coordinating Committee on Women in the Historical Profession. She regularly reviewed books for journals including RQ and The History Teacher. She was a member of Phi Beta Kappa.

== Personal life ==
Boutelle married a Marine corporal, William Cavenaugh Rose, in 1950; they divorced in 1952. She died in 2008, aged 76 years, in Santa Rosa, California.
