= Berenice A. Carroll =

American political scientist and activist

- Born: December 14, 1932; New York City, U.S.
- Died: May 10, 2018 (aged 85); Lafayette, Indiana, U.S.
- Education: Queens College, City University of New York; Brown University
- Known for: Coordinating Committee on Women in the Historical Profession
- Spouse: Clint Fink
- Children: 2
- Scientific career
- Fields: Political science, peace and conflict studies, feminist theory, women's studies
- Workplaces: University of Illinois Urbana-Champaign; Purdue University

Berenice Anita Carroll (née Jacobs; December 14, 1932 – May 10, 2018) was an American political scientist and activist specialized in peace and conflict studies, feminist theory, and women's studies. Carroll led the creation of the women's studies program at University of Illinois Urbana-Champaign and served as director of the Purdue University women's studies program. She initiated the establishment of the Coordinating Committee on Women in the Historical Profession in 1969.

== Early life and education ==
Carroll was born December 14, 1932, in New York City to Margaret and Morris Jacobs. Carroll volunteered and lived in a kibbutz during the early 1950s. She attended Queens College, City University of New York from 1949 to 1953, graduating in September 1953 with a B.A. in history, magna cum laude. She was elected to Phi Beta Kappa and held a University of the State of New York scholarship.

At Brown University, Carroll completed a reader graduate assistantship from 1953 to 1954 and a teaching assistantship from 1954 to 1955. She held the Miss Abbott's School Alumnae fellowship and a graduate assistantship from 1955 to 1956. She studied modern European history, history of science, renaissance and reformation, English medieval constitutional history, European economic history, and American political history since 1783. Carroll was awarded a Fulbright Award and studied at the University of Frankfurt am Main from 1956 to 1957 and University of Göttingen in 1957. In 1957, she received another Miss Abbott's School Alumnae fellowship to research German records in Alexandria, Virginia. As a result, from December 1957 to July 1959, Carroll joined the microfilming project staff of the American Historical Association's committee for the study of war documents at Alexandria.

Carroll completed Ph.D. from Brown University in 1960. Her June 1960 dissertation was titled Design for Total War: The Contest for 'Wehrwirtschaft' under the Third Reich. Donald G. Rohr was her doctoral advisor.

== Career ==
Carroll was the chair of the division of general studies at University of Illinois Urbana-Champaign (UIUC) from 1966 to 1969.

The Coordinating Committee on Women in the Historical Profession was founded in 1969 after Carroll circulated a letter urging women who were going to attend the American Historical Association's annual meeting in Washington, D.C., in December to come together and discuss creating their own affiliate organization. From 1969 to 1970, Carroll and Gerda Lerner served as co-chairs. Carroll was the chair in 1971.

Carroll worked as the UIUC director of the department of gender and women's studies from 1983 to 1987 and led the creation of the women's studies program. The women's studies minor was also approved during her tenure.

Carroll became the director of the Purdue University women's studies program in 1990. She was awarded the Violet Haas Award "for developing an educational program that promoted the advancement of women and their rights" while at Purdue University.

== Campaign for the Equal Rights Amendment ==
Carroll was an outspoken supporter of the Equal Rights Amendment (ERA). In 1981, Carroll co-founded a group called Grassroots Group of Second Class Citizens alongside activists Mary Lee Sargent. Georgia Fuller, an activist from the National Organization for Women in Virginia, was also involved in this campaign as was notable ERA supporter Sonia Johnson. These women planned a series of non-violent actions to raise awareness for the amendment which failed to see ratification by the 38 states necessary by 1982. After the failure of the ERA in 1982, members of the Grassroots Group of Second Class Citizens planned a series of direct action protests with Women Rising in Resistance.

== Personal life ==
Carroll was married to Robert Carroll. They had two sons. She later married social psychologist Clint Flink. Shel died on May 10, 2018, in Lafayette, Indiana.

== Selected works ==
- Carroll, Berenice Anita (1968). Design for Total War: Arms and Economics in the Third Reich. De Gruyter Mouton. ISBN 978-3-11-100225-5.
- Carroll, Berenice A., ed. (1976). Liberating Women's History: Theoretical and Critical Essays. University of Illinois Press. ISBN 978-0-252-00441-4.
- Carroll, Berenice A.; Mohraz, Jane E., eds. (1989). In a Great Company of Women: Nonviolent Direct Action (Special issue. Published as volume 12, number 1, 1989 of Women's Studies International Forum). New York: Pergamon Press. OCLC 19899314.
- Smith, Hilda L.; Carroll, Berenice A., eds. (2000). Women's Political & Social Thought: An Anthology. Indiana University Press. ISBN 978-0-253-33758-0.
