= Barbara Krauthamer =

American historian (born 1967)

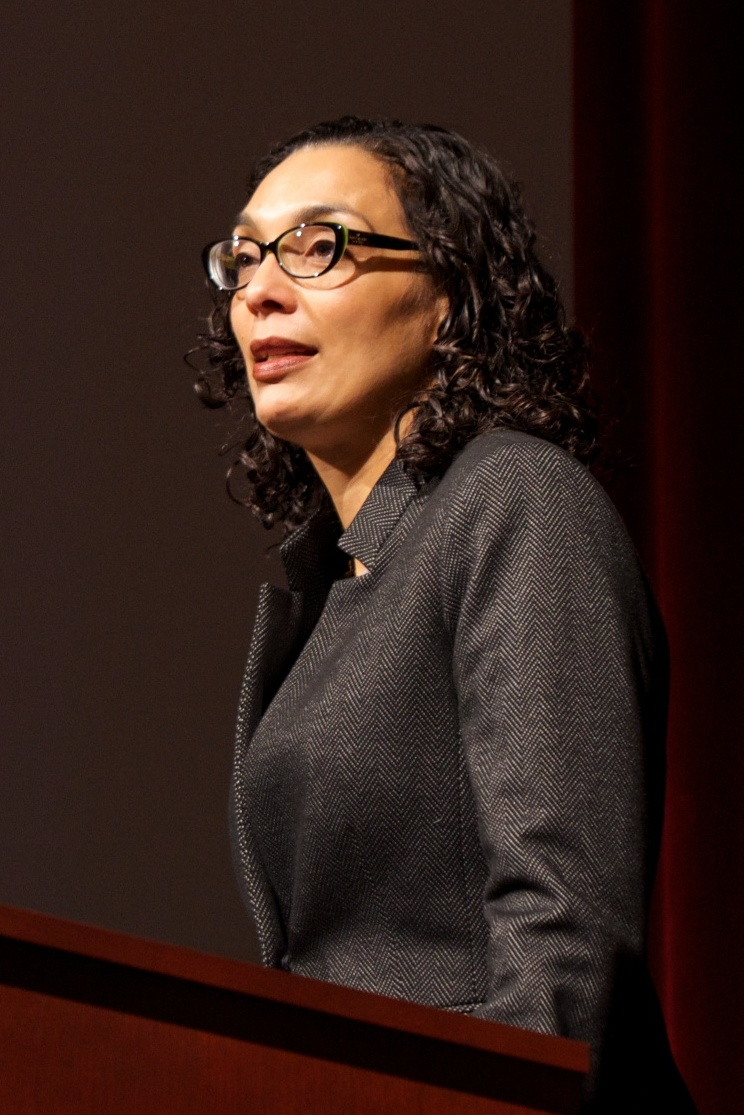
- Krauthamer in 2013
- Born: 1967 (age 58–59); New Jersey, U.S.
- Occupation: Historian
- Awards: NAACP Image Award for Outstanding Literary Work – Nonfiction (2013); Lorraine A. Williams Leadership Award (2017)

Academic background
- Education: Dartmouth College (BA); Washington University in St. Louis (MA); Princeton University (PhD)
- Thesis: Blacks on the Borders: African-Americans' Transition from Slavery to Freedom in Texas and the Indian Territory, 1836-1907 (2000)

Academic work
- Discipline: African-American history
- Institutions: UMass Amherst; Emory University

Barbara Krauthamer (born 1967) is an American historian specializing in African-American history. She was the dean of the College of Arts and Sciences at Emory University since 2023, until she stepped down on January 6, 2026. Prior to this, Krauthamer was the dean of the College of Humanities and Fine Arts at the University of Massachusetts Amherst from 2020 until 2023.

== Biography ==
Barbara Krauthamer was born in 1967 in New Jersey. Her father was a German Jew who had fled to the United States in 1938, later co-founding the Rutgers New Jersey Medical School. Her mother was "the first African American woman to receive a doctorate in clinical psychology from Rutgers University". After growing up in Princeton, New Jersey, Krauthamer attended Dartmouth College, where she initially majored in neuroscience. While at Dartmouth, Krauthamer organized and led rallies against apartheid in South Africa, later switching her major to government. She graduated from Dartmouth in 1989 with a bachelor's degree in government. After working at public defender's offices in New York City and Washington, D.C. for several years, Krauthamer began attending graduate school at Washington University in St. Louis, graduating in 1994 with a master's degree in history. She received a doctorate in history from Princeton University in 2000.

After working as a faculty member at New York University, Krauthamer became an assistant professor of history at the University of Massachusetts Amherst in 2008, specializing in African-American history and the history of slavery. In 2013, she published the book Black Slaves, Indian Masters: Slavery, Emancipation, and Citizenship in the Native American South, which is the "first full-length study of chattel slavery and the lives of enslaved people in the Choctaw and Chickasaw Indian nations". The same year, she and photographer Deborah Willis co-authored Envisioning Emancipation: Black Americans and the End of Slavery, a book which featured over 150 historical images of African Americans. Envisioning Emancipation was highly recognized, and was awarded the 2013 NAACP Image Award for Outstanding Literary Work in Non-Fiction. Krauthamer has also edited Major Problems in African American History, a prominent textbook in the field. In 2017, she was awarded the Lorraine A. Williams Leadership Award by the Association of Black Women Historians for her efforts in creating "opportunities for Black women in higher education". From 2018 to 2019, Krauthamer was also the president of the Southern Association for Women Historians.

In 2017, Krauthamer was appointed dean of the University of Massachusetts Graduate School, overseeing the university's graduate program. In this role, she "created multiple fellowship and mentoring programs designed to support the recruitment and retention of traditionally underrepresented graduate students". She had previously served as graduate program director in the department of history, where she advocated for increased diversity and changes to the admissions and funding processes for doctoral students. Krauthamer was appointed dean of the University of Massachusetts Amherst College of Humanities and Fine Arts in 2020. On November 1, 2022, she was appointed to the Massachusetts Cultural Council by Governor Charlie Baker.

On July 1, 2023, Krauthamer left the University of Massachusetts to become the dean of the College of Arts and Sciences at Emory University, becoming the university's first African American dean. On January 6, 2026, Krauthamer stepped down for personal reasons She remains an Emory College faculty member.

== Publications ==
- Krauthamer, Barbara (2013). Black Slaves, Indian Masters: Slavery, Emancipation, and Citizenship in the Native American South. Chapel Hill: University of North Carolina Press. ISBN 978-1-4696-0711-5.
- Willis, Deborah; Krauthamer, Barbara (2013). Envisioning Emancipation: Black Americans and the End of Slavery. Philadelphia: Temple University Press. ISBN 978-1-4399-0986-7.
- Krauthamer, Barbara; Williams, Chad, eds. (2017). Major Problems in African American History (2nd ed.). Cengage. ISBN 978-1-337-51609-9.
