= Michele Gillespie =

American historian

Michele Gillespie is an American historian, editor, academic administrator and educator. She is the "Presidential Endowed Professor of Southern History" and former provost at Wake Forest University in Winston-Salem, North Carolina. Her work specializes in American history, focusing on gender, race, class, and region in the American South.

== About ==
Gillespie received a M.A. degree and Ph.D. from Princeton University, where she studied under the direction of James M. McPherson. She studied at Rice University in Houston, Texas as an undergraduate student, and has a B.A. degree.

In 2005, she served as president of the Southern Association for Women Historians. She is series co-editor of New Directions in Southern History, published by the University Press of Kentucky, with William Link.

In 2015, Gillespie was named dean of Wake Forest University's undergraduate college. In 2022, she was appointed provost. She returned to her professorship in 2025.

== Works ==
- The Devil's Lane: Sex and Race in the Early South, Catherine Clinton and Michele Gillespie, eds. (New York: Oxford University Press, 1997)
- Taking Off the White Gloves: Southern Women and Women's History, Michele Gillespie and Catherine Clinton, eds. (Columbia: University of Missouri Press, 1998)
- Free Labor in an Unfree World: White Artisans in Slaveholding Georgia, 1789-1860, (Athens: University of Georgia Press, 2000)
- Neither Lady Nor Slave: Working Women of the Old South, Michele Gillespie and Susanna Delfino (Chapel Hill: University of North Carolina Press, 2002)
- Thomas Dixon and the Birth of Modern America, Michele Gillespie and Randal Hall (Baton Rouge: Louisiana State University Press, 2006)
- Pious Pursuits: German Moravians in the Atlantic World, Michele Gillespie and Robert M. Beachy, eds. (Oxford: Berghahn Books, 2007)
- Katharine and R.J. Reynolds: Partners of Fortune and the Making of the New South, (Athens: University of Georgia Press, 2012)
