= John B. Boles =

American historian

- Born: October 20, 1943 (age 82); Houston, Texas, U.S.
- Occupation: Professor
- Spouse(s): Nancy Gaebler Boles, m. 1967

Academic background
- Education: BA, PhD
- Alma mater: Rice University; University of Virginia

Academic work
- Discipline: History
- Institutions: Rice University

John B. Boles (born October 20, 1943) is an American historian. He retired as the William P. Hobby Professor of American History at Rice University in 2019.

== Early life ==
John B. Boles was born on October 20, 1943, in Houston, Texas, to Billie and Mary Boles. After WWII ended, his parents returned to their hometown of Center, Texas, a rural, racially segregated Bible Belt town. They raised cotton, and later, chickens, and Mr. Boles also drove a taxi. The family was staunchly Baptist in a town permeated with evangelical Christianity. This background—and his lack of awareness of other lifestyles—informed Boles' later historical research.

Young Boles was an avid student, and after high school enrolled at Rice University, where he earned a Bachelor of Arts degree in 1965. In 1967, he married classmate Nancy Gaebler, with whom he later had two children. He earned a PhD from the University of Virginia in 1969.

== Career ==
Boles' career began in 1969 as an assistant professor at Towson State University near Baltimore, and within five years, he was promoted to full professor. Near the end of his ten-year tenure at Towson he was also an NEH Fellow in Anthropology at Johns Hopkins University.

In 1977 he initiated his long-term relationship with Rice University, working there for a year as visiting editor of the Journal of Southern History. In 1978 he moved to New Orleans and taught at Tulane University. In 1981, Boles settled at Rice, where he was appointed Allyn R. and Gladys M. Cline Chair in History in 1991 and William P. Hobby Professor of American History from 1997 until his retirement in 2019.

Boles is the author of numerous books about the social history of the Southern United States, including religious, black, and women's history, and the editor of a dozen more. His articles and reviews have been published widely in academic journals. For over 30 years, he was the editor the Southern Historical Association's publication, Journal of Southern History, retiring in 2013. He served as president of the SHA for the 2017–18 term.

The culminating work of Boles' career is Jefferson: Architect of American Liberty, published in 2017, in which he took "an interpretive middle ground" regarding the wide swing of opinions on Jefferson's complex personality and legacy. Boles' aim was to "view him [Jefferson] holistically and within the rich context of his time and place." Jonathan Yardley called the book "perhaps the finest one-volume biography of an American president."

== Awards and fellowships ==
- Robert Foster Cherry Chair for Distinguished Teaching, 1999-2000
- George R. Brown Award for Superior Teaching, 2007, 2009
- Thomas Jefferson Foundation Fellow, 1966-68
- Woodrow Wilson Dissertation Fellow, 1968-69
- National Endowment for the Humanities Fellow in Anthropology at Johns Hopkins University, 1976-77

== Selected works ==
- Boles, John B. (1972). The Great Revival, 1787–1805: The Origins of the Southern Evangelical Mind. Lexington: University Press of Kentucky (Reprinted Ann Arbor, UMI, 1992.). ISBN 0-8131-1260-5. OCLC 664363602.
- Boles, John B. (1983). Black Southerners. Lexington: University Press of Kentucky. ISBN 0-8131-0303-7. OCLC 9621875.
- Boles, John B. (1994). The Irony of Southern Religion. New York: Peter Lang. ISBN 9780820425849. OCLC 30354169.
- Boles, John B. (1997). A University So Conceived: A Brief History of Rice. Houston, Texas: Rice University. OCLC 37907268.
- Boles, John B. (2001) "Coming of Age in the Bible Belt" in Autobiographical Reflections on Southern Religious History, Univ. of Georgia Press, pp. 111–30. Publisher's website. Also available as Google book.
- Boles, John B. (2004). The South Through Time: A History of an American Region. Upper Saddle River, New Jersey: Pearson Prentice Hall. ISBN 9780131835481. OCLC 65167047.
- Boles, John B. (2007). A Companion to the American South. Chichester, U.K.: John Wiley & Sons. ISBN 9781405138307. OCLC 437213922.
- Boles, John B. (2007). University Builder: Edgar Odell Lovett and the Founding of the Rice Institute. Baton Rouge, Louisiana: Louisiana State University Press. ISBN 978-0-8071-3522-8. OCLC 928924562.
- Boles, John B.; Hall, Randal L. (2010). Seeing Jefferson Anew In His Time and Ours. Charlottesville, Virginia: University of Virginia Press. ISBN 9780813929934. OCLC 860399811.
- Boles, John B. (2017). Jefferson: Architect of American Liberty. New York: Basic Books. ISBN 9780465094684. OCLC 1001569980.
