= Colyer Meriwether =

American historian, educator, and writer

Colyer Meriwether (8 April 1858 – 26 August 1920) was an American historian, educator, and writer.

== Early life ==
Meriwether was born in Clark’s Hill, South Carolina. He earned an undergraduate degree at Johns Hopkins University in 1886, and the university awarded him a Ph.D. in 1893.

== Career ==
In 1889–1892, Meriwether was employed by the Japanese government in Sendai.

He was elected a member of the Asiatic Society of Japan and the American Historical Association. He was secretary and treasurer of the Southern History Association.

== Selected works ==
- History of Higher Education in South Carolina, 1889
- Date Masamune and His Embassy to Rome, 1892

== See also ==
- Foreign government advisors in Meiji Japan
