= John Hope (educator) =

African-American educator and political activist

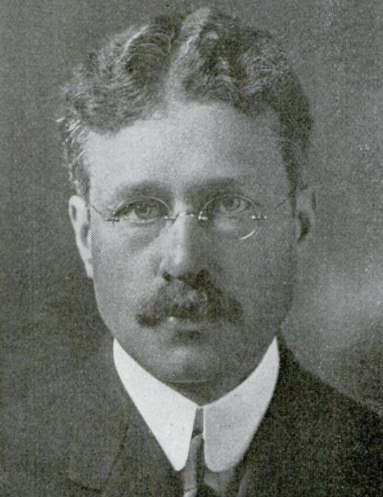
- Born: June 2, 1868; Augusta, Georgia, U.S.
- Died: February 22, 1936 (aged 67); Atlanta, Georgia, U.S.
- Occupations: Educator, political activist
- Spouse: Lugenia D. Burns
- Parent(s): James Hope, Mary Frances Taylor

John Hope (June 2, 1868 – February 22, 1936), born in Augusta, Georgia, was an American educator and political activist, the first African-descended president of both Morehouse College in 1906 and of Atlanta University in 1929, where he worked to develop graduate programs. Both are historically Black colleges.

Determined to finish his education after having had to leave school to help support his family after his father's death, Hope went North: graduating from Worcester Academy and Brown University. He returned to the South to teach, and in 1906 became the first African-American president of Atlanta Baptist College. He served as president until his death in 1936. After the college's affiliation with Atlanta University, Hope was selected in 1929 as the university's first African-American president; he worked to develop the institution's graduate programs to ensure higher education for Black students.

Hope was active in national civil rights organizations, including the Niagara Movement, the succeeding National Association for the Advancement of Colored People (NAACP), and the Southern-based Commission on Interracial Cooperation. In addition, he was active in the National Urban League, the YMCA, and the National Association of Teachers in Colored Schools. In 1936, he was awarded the NAACP's Spingarn Medal.

== Early life and education ==
John Hope was born in 1868 in Augusta, Georgia, the son of James Hope, a white Scots-American merchant, and Mary Frances Taylor, a free woman of color. Her mother was part of the class of free people of color well before the Civil War. The senior Hope was born in Langholm, Scotland in 1805, and migrated with his parents at age 12 to New York City in 1817. As a young man, he established a successful grocery business in Manhattan.

In 1831, the senior Hope moved south to Augusta, Georgia, where he became a successful businessman. He later formed a relationship with Mary Frances Taylor. State law prohibited interracial marriage, but they lived openly as a couple to the end of his life and had a family. Of majority European ancestry, their son John Hope was European in appearance and could have passed for white. But, he identified with the African American community and devoted his life to its education and advancement in the postwar segregated South.

Hope was eight when his father died, and his family struggled financially; the executors failed to carry out his father's plans for support of him and his mother. The youth left school after eighth grade to work, but five years later John Hope was determined to get educated. He managed to go north for his education, graduating from Worcester Academy in 1890. He went on to Brown University, graduating in 1894. Hope was a member of Alpha Phi Alpha fraternity.

== Career and marriage ==
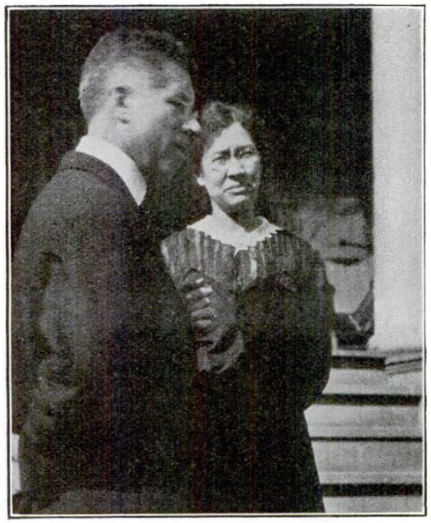
John and Lugenia Burns Hope

John Hope returned to the South and began teaching at Roger Williams University in Nashville, Tennessee, a historically Black college founded after the Civil War.

A few years after Hope got established, on December 29, 1897 he married the former Lugenia D. Burns of Nashville. They had children. Lugenia Burns Hope became a well-known social reformer.

In 1898, Hope became a professor of Classics at Atlanta Baptist College (now Morehouse College), a historically Black college. He moved with his family to Georgia. In 1906, Hope was unanimously chosen to be president of Atlanta Baptist College, the first man of African descent to serve in that position. In 1913, the institution was renamed as Morehouse College.

Hope joined W. E. B. Du Bois and William Monroe Trotter, northern activists, as founders of the Niagara Movement to work for civil rights for Blacks. He was also active in the succeeding organization, National Association for the Advancement of Colored People (NAACP), founded in 1909, and became considered a national race leader. He supported full civil rights for Blacks and promoted college education, becoming known for that as Booker T. Washington of the Tuskegee Institute was known for vocational education. Hope and Du Bois both agreed that Blacks must have the chance for full academic education to develop leaders for their people.

Hope also became active in the National Urban League, the "Colored Men's Department" of the YMCA, and the National Association of Teachers in Colored Schools. During World War I, Hope went to France, where he served the United States as a YMCA secretary with American Black soldiers from 1918 until 1919. After his return to the US, he organized the southern-based Commission on Interracial Cooperation, and served as its first president.

Hope continued as president of Morehouse College until his death in 1936. In 1928, Morehouse and Spelman College, a women's college, became affiliated with Atlanta University, another historically Black college. In 1929 Hope was selected as Atlanta University's first African-American president. He concentrated on building the university's graduate studies to ensure high-achieving Black scholars a place in academia. He inspired generations of scholars and activists. During his presidency, Atlanta University launched a graduate school, established their Department of Fine Arts, and opened the Trevor Arnett Library.

== Legacy and honors ==
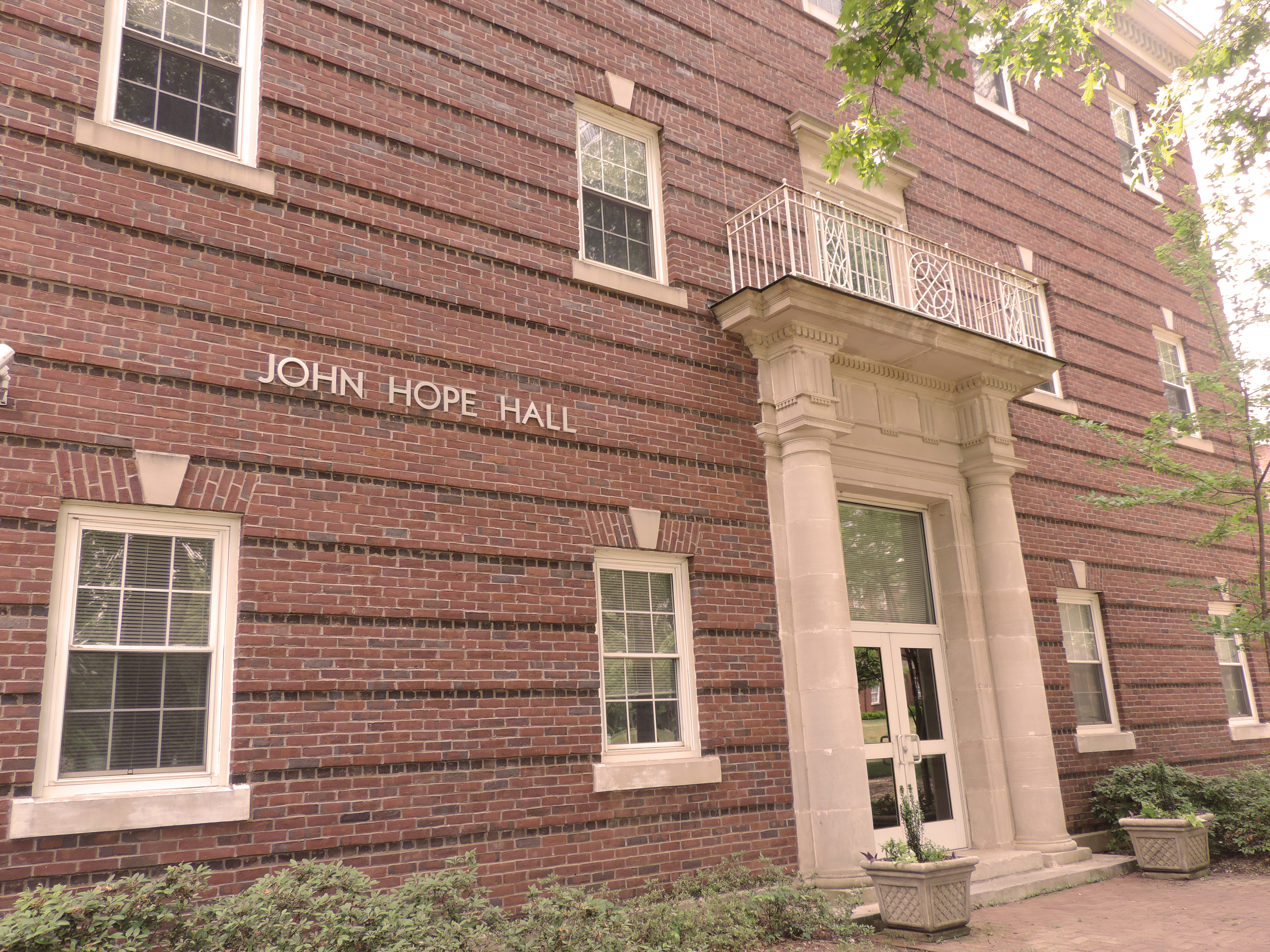
John Hope Hall, Morehouse College, Atlanta

- In 1932, Hope received an LL.D. from Bates College.
- In 1936, he was awarded the Spingarn Medal from the NAACP.
- In 1944, the Liberty ship SS John Hope was named for him.
- In 1950 Chicago radio station WMAQ produced the episode "John Hope, Educator" in the anthology program Destination Freedom (written by scriptwriter Richard Durham) about his life and career.
- John Hope College Preparatory High School, located at 5515 S. Lowe, in the Englewood neighborhood in Chicago was named for him.
- Hope-Hill Elementary School, located at 112 Boulevard, N.E., in the Old Fourth Ward neighborhood in Atlanta was named for him.
- Hope was invited as the Convention Speaker for Alpha Phi Alpha's Silver Anniversary convention in Nashville, Tennessee.
- The Science Hall at Morehouse College was re-named John Hope Hall.
- Worcester Academy created the John Hope Fellowship for young educators of color in 2007. The first fellowship awarded to artist and educator Robyn Thompson Duong
- Camp John Hope in Marshallville, Georgia is also named for John Hope.
- Hope was a close friend and served as a mentor of Alonzo G. Morón, who went on to become the president of Hampton University
