= Collier, Georgia =

Unincorporated community in Georgia, U.S.

Coordinates: 33°02′49″N 84°01′01″W

Collier is an unincorporated community in Monroe County, in the U.S. state of Georgia.

== History ==
The community was named after Cuthbert Collier, a pioneer settler. Variant names were "Colliers" and "Collier Station". A post office called Collier was in operation from 1875 until 1905.
