= John Collier (sculptor) =

American sculptor

John Collier (born June 26, 1948) is an American sculptor and artist, most renowned as one of the sculptors for the Catholic Memorial at Ground Zero.

== Childhood ==
Collier was born on June 26, 1948, in Dallas, Texas, to parents Carroll Lloyd Collier and Mildred Louise Ferguson, and was the oldest of six children (three brothers, two sisters). He attended and graduated school in Dallas, and according to his father (an artist himself), "...demonstrated great talent...as an artist..."

During his time in college at North Texas, John originally planned to study philosophy or engineering. The academic curriculum allowed him to attend only two art courses per semester, but the limitations did not suit Collier. He has said, "I had other ideas...I had a figure drawing class in the morning; then, stayed in the studio drawing all day. I failed all my other classes, got an A in drawing, and learned what I wanted to learn."

== Career ==
From a selected group of more than thirty artists, John Collier was chosen as one of the sculptors for the Catholic Memorial at Ground Zero. His four sculptures, representing the patron saints of police officers, firefighters, and workers, along with St. Mary Magdalene, first witness to the Resurrection, along with the chapel design team and the other chosen artists received the prestigious Optimé Award and were dedicated by Cardinal Egan in May 2005 in memory of those who died on 9/11/01 and of those who took part in the rescue effort. The works are permanently installed at St. Joseph’s Chapel, adjacent to Ground Zero in New York.

Mr. Collier’s work has been exhibited at the Westmoreland Museum of American Art, the Mulvane Museum, the Narthex Gallery at Saint Peter’s Church in New York City and at Tatischeff Gallery in New York, the New York Historical Society Museum, Christie's Auction House, and the Smithsonian Institution’s Traveling Art Exhibition, the Museum of Biblical Art (Dallas), as well as many churches and religious institutions.

Mr. Collier is one of America's most honored Artists. His “St. Mary Magdalene” won the 2006 Design Award from Faith & Form and IFRAA, the Interfaith Forum on Religion, Art and Architecture, a division of the American Institute of Architects (AIA). John won the same award in 2004 and 2003 for his “Crucifix” and for “Mary at the Wedding at Cana,” which was also awarded the 2004 Best-of-Show honor from Ministry & Liturgy.

He has received over twenty Gold and Silver medals from the Society of Illustrators in New York, and he has received numerous awards from arts institutions of higher learning. He was honored as the Joyce C. Hall Distinguished Visiting Professor at the University of Kansas. He has lectured at Syracuse University, Art Center College of Design, Pratt Institute, Smithsonian Institution, the University of Delaware, and at many other recognized institutions of Art.

Some of his clients have included: Atlantic Monthly, Bell Atlantic, C.B.S., Catholic Health Services, Conde Nast Publications, Forbes magazine, New York City Ballet, New York Times, Our Lady of the Lake Catholic Church in Rockwall Texas, Oscar de la Renta, Catholic Diocese of Greensburg, Pennsylvania, Random House Publishing, Walt Disney Productions, Time magazine, St. Gabriel’s Catholic Church in McKinney, Texas, and DeBeers Diamonds.

While much of his life has been spent making art for the world's major secular institutions and for private collectors, in recent years, John has devoted himself to painting and sculpting for the church.
