= William Link (historian) =

American historian

William A. Link
- Born: United States
- Occupations: Historian, academic and author

Academic background
- Education: B.A., History; M.A. American History; PhD American History
- Alma mater: Davidson College; University of Virginia

Academic work
- Institutions: University of Florida

William A. Link is an American historian, academic and author. He is a Richard J. Milbauer Professor of History Emeritus at the University of Florida.

Link is most known for his works on the history of the American South. Among his sole-authored works are his publications in academic journals, including the Journal of Southern History, as well as books such as A Hard Country and a Lonely Place: Schooling, Society and Reform in Rural Virginia (1986), The Paradox of Southern Progressivism (1992), Southern Crucible: The Making of the American South (2015) and The Last Fire-Eater: Roger A. Pryor and the Search for a Southern Identity (2022).

== Education ==
Link earned his B.A. in History from Davidson College in 1976, subsequently completing an M.A. in American History at the University of Virginia in 1979. He then pursued his PhD in American History at the same institution, completing it in 1981.

== Career ==
At the University of North Carolina at Greensboro, he initially served as an assistant professor of history from 1981 to 1986, followed by appointments as an associate professor (1986 to 1992), and subsequently professor of history (1993–1999) and Lucy Spinks Keker Excellence Professor (1999–2004). Concurrently, he held positions as associate dean of UNCG's College of Arts and Sciences (1995–1998) and head of the Department of History (1998–2004). Moreover, between 2004 and 2022, he held the position of Richard J. Milbauer Professor of History at the University of Florida.

== Works ==
Link has authored various books throughout his career. In 1986, he authored A Hard Country and a Lonely Place: Schooling, Society, and Reform in Rural Virginia. The book examined the transformation of Virginia's rural schools between 1870 and 1920, emphasizing the impact of localism on education expansion initially, and later, the clash between urban reformers and local communities, resulting in significant changes in governance, curriculum, and the imposition of segregated pedagogy. His 1993 book The Paradox of Southern Progressivism, 1880–1930 explored the cultural conflicts between social reformers and rural communities in the American South during the Progressive Era, highlighting how differing values and approaches ultimately hindered the success of progressive reforms. Through his 2003 book Roots of Secession: Slavery and Politics in Antebellum Virginia he offered a fresh perspective on the politics of secession in antebellum Virginia, highlighting the significant role of African Americans, both enslaved and free, in shaping the state's political landscape and contributing to the onset of the Civil War.

Link, in his book North Carolina: Change and Tradition in Southern State (2009; 2nd edition, 2018) provided a comprehensive exploration of North Carolina's history, tracing its evolution from pre-contact times to the 2008 elections, highlighting the interplay between traditionalism, class, race, gender dynamics, and modernization, offering insight into the state's past and future. The book was reviewed by L. Scott Philyaw, who is a faculty member at Western Carolina University. In his review of the book, he said "Bill Link has written a valuable contribution for college-level classes in North Carolina history. His well-written text is balanced in terms of chronology and topic selection. North Carolina: Change and Tradition in a Southern State is a significant and welcome addition to current North Carolina history texts". His 2013 book Atlanta, Cradle of the New South: Race and Remembering in the Civil War's Aftermath explored the significance of the Civil War and its aftermath, focusing on Atlanta as a pivotal city where the destruction, rebuilding, and struggles for power and identity shaped the transition from the Old South to the New South for both white and African American populations.

In his 2015 publication Southern Crucible: The Making of the American South, Link examined the American South's history, presenting a balanced narrative of its social, political, cultural, and economic evolution over four centuries. His later work included a biography exploring the multifaceted life of Roger A. Pryor, a prominent figure in the American South whose journey from fervent secessionist to post-war reconciler reflects the broader transformations of the region during the 19th century. The book was reviewed by Brianna Frakes, who said "In The Last Fire-Eater, renowned historian William A. Link brings readers into the world of Roger A. Pryor, a man whose life Link argues is emblematic of the American South's transformation during the Civil War era." She further commended the book for focusing significantly on how Pryor had to adapt to the profound transformations brought about by the Civil War and its aftermath, despite not being a comprehensive biography of his entire life. In addition to books, he has authored a variety of publications, encompassing book reviews and articles.

== Awards and honors ==
- 1993, 1995 – North Carolina Mayflower Award, Society of Mayflower Descendants in the State of North Carolina
- 2018 – 2019 – President, Southern Historical Association

== Bibliography ==
=== Books ===
- A Hard Country and a Lonely Place: Schooling, Society, and Reform in Rural Virginia (1986) ISBN 9780807865637
- The Paradox of Southern Progressivism, 1880–1930 (1996) ISBN 9780807845899
- Frank Porter Graham: Southern Liberal, Citizen of the World (2021) ISBN 9781469664934

=== Selected articles ===
- Link, W. A. (1983). Making the Inarticulate Speak: A Reassessment of Public Education in the Rural South, 1870–1920. Journal of Thought, 63–75.
- Link, W. A. (1988). Privies, progressivism, and public schools: health reform and education in the rural South, 1909–1920. The Journal of Southern History, 54(4), 623–642.
- Link, W. A. (1995). William Friday and the North Carolina Speaker Ban Crisis, 1963–1968. The North Carolina Historical Review, 72(2), 198–228.
- Link, W. A. (1998). The Jordan Hatcher Case: Politics and" A Spirit of Insubordination" in Antebellum Virginia. The Journal of Southern History, 64(4), 615–648.
- Link, W. A. (2009). " This Bastard New Virginia": Slavery, West Virginia Exceptionalism, and the Secession Crisis. West Virginia History, 3(1), 37–56.
