= Feminist Studies =

Peer-reviewed academic journal on women's studies

- Discipline: Women's studies
- Language: English
- Edited by: Jennifer C. Nash

Publication details
- History: 1972–present
- Publisher: Feminist Studies, Inc. (United States)
- Frequency: Triannually
- Impact factor: 0.520 (2015)

Standard abbreviations
- ISO 4: Fem. Stud.

Indexing
- CODEN: FMSDA2
- ISSN: 0046-3663 (print); 2153-3873 (web)
- LCCN: sc76000192
- JSTOR: 00463663
- OCLC no.: 476420375

Links
- Journal homepage; Online access; Online archive

Feminist Studies is a peer-reviewed academic journal covering women's studies that was established in 1972. It is an independent nonprofit publication. Besides scholarly articles, the journal also publishes creative writing (poetry, fiction, and memoirs), artwork and art essays, book reviews, political and social commentaries, interviews, and activist reports.

Occasionally, special issues are published on topics such as Chicana Studies; Women and Prison; Women's Work, Social Class, and Socialism; Sexuality, Sexual Violence, and Sexual Identities; Culture and History in the New South Africa; the Body and Healthcare; Rethinking the Global; and Conjugality and Sexual Economies in India.

== History ==
The journal was established in 1972 in New York City by feminist academics and activists who were committed to creating a scholarly journal with high standards and community relevance. This feminist network believed that the women's movement needed an analytic forum to engage the issues raised by the movement and to bring together the contributions of feminist activists and scholars. Dr. Claire Goldberg Moses, professor emerita of women's studies at the University of Maryland, was the journal's editorial director for over three decades, running it alongside a collective of scholars in multiple disciplines and locations. The journal continues to be edited by a collective, with Jennifer C. Nash as its editorial director.

== Impact ==
Feminist Studies remains a significant academic resource, shaping feminist thought and practice since its conception. It has and continues to be widely referenced in humanities studies. The journal has contributed to public discourse, activism, gender and liberal studies in general. The periodical has created platforms for women and provided opportunities to scholars, artists and activists. Feminist Studies is one of the oldest and longest running feminist periodicals in history.

== Abstracting and indexing ==
- Alternative Press Index
- America: History and Life
- Current Contents on Social and Behavioral Index
- EBSCO databases
- Historical Abstracts
- MLA International Bibliography
- The Philosopher's Index
- ProQuest databases
- Social Sciences Citation Index
- Sociological Abstracts

According to the Journal Citation Reports, the journal has a 2015 impact factor of 0.520, ranking it 27th out of 40 journals in the category "Women's Studies".
