= Southern History Association =

The Southern History Association was a short-lived professional American organization of historians who studied the American South. The organization was founded in 1896, at the time of the Southern Renaissance, when a need for professionalization among historians in the United States gave rise to a more scientific treatment of history.

The organization was founded in Washington, D. C., in 1896, and many of its members were not academically employed. Founders included historians William K. Boyd from Trinity College (now Duke University) and Richard Heath Dabney from the University of Virginia, and literary scholar William Peterfield Trent, from Sewanee. They published a well-regarded journal, Publications of the Southern History Association, and were hoping to organize conferences and attract a broad audience. However, the association never managed to gain such an audience or the necessary institutional support, and never had more than 250 members. The articles published in the Publications were "dry as dust" and focused more on America as a whole and the idea of nation-building, rather than on the South, and according to its own editor, Colyer Meriwether, was unable to reach a more popular Southern audience. By the end of 1907, the association had ceased to be.
