= Glenda Gilmore =

American historian

Glenda Elizabeth Gilmore is an American historian of the American South at Yale University. She is the author of many publications, including "These United States: A Nation in the Making 1890 to Present" (2015), "Gender and Jim Crow: Women and the Politics of White Supremacy in North Carolina, 1896-1920" (1996), and "Defying Dixie: The Radical Roots of Civil Rights, 1919-1950" (2008).

== Life ==
An eighth-generation North Carolinian, Gilmore received her B.A. in Psychology from Wake Forest University. She taught high school history in South Carolina for several years and held managerial positions in private industry before returning to school to graduate from the University of North Carolina at Charlotte with an M.A., and the University of North Carolina at Chapel Hill with a Ph.D. She studied at the Radcliffe Institute at Harvard University.

She taught history at Queens University of Charlotte in Charlotte, North Carolina before joining Yale University as an assistant professor in 1994, full professor of history in 1998, and Peter V. & C. Vann Woodward Professor of History in 2001. She is also a member of the University's African American studies and American studies departments and currently serves as the Acting Chair of the African American Studies Department. Her areas of expertise include: race relations, women's and African-American history, the history of social reform, American religious activism, North Carolina history, the history of prostitution and the political, social and cultural history of the United States in the late 19th and 20th centuries.

In 2015 she published, with Thomas Sugrue, a synthetic reinterpretation of society and politics in twentieth century America.

She is married to noted Cambodian genocide scholar Ben Kiernan.

== Awards ==
- Lerner-Scott Prize from the Organization of American Historians
- Frederick Jackson Turner Award from the Organization of American Historians for the best first book by an author
- James A. Rawley Prize from the Organization of American Historians for the best book on the history of race relations in the United States (1997)
- Julia Cherry Spruill Prize from the Southern Association for Women Historians
- Yale Heyman Prize for junior faculty

== Works ==
- Gender and Jim Crow: Women and the Politics of White Supremacy in North Carolina, 1896-1920. 1996
- Defying Dixie: The Radical Roots of Civil Rights, 1919-1950 W. W. Norton & Company, January 2008. ISBN 978-0-393-33532-3
- "Am I a 'Screwball,' or am I a Pioneer?": Pauli's Murray's Civil Rights Movement in Walter Isaacson (ed.) Profiles in Leadership (W. W. Norton & Company, 2011)
