= Hilda L. Smith =

American historian (1941–2023)

- Born: 1941
- Died: October 24, 2023 (aged 82)

Academic background
- Education: Missouri State University; University of Chicago

Academic work
- Discipline: History, gender analysis
- Institutions: University of Maryland, College Park; University of Cincinnati

Hilda L. Smith (1941 – October 24, 2023) was an American historian who specialized in the gender analysis of political theory and intellectual history. She was a faculty member at the University of Cincinnati.

== Life ==
Smith was born in 1941. She was an undergraduate at Missouri State University, trained as a high school teacher, and subsequently completed a Ph.D. at the University of Chicago in 1975. Her dissertation was titled Feminism in Seventeenth-century England.

Smith was a faculty member at the University of Maryland, College Park, where she was a humanities administrator. In 1987, she joined the University of Cincinnati. She specialized in the gender analysis of political theory and intellectual history and the "political, philosophical, and scientific writings of early modern women.

Smith died on October 24, 2023.

== Selected works ==
- Smith, Hilda L. (1982). Reason's Disciples: Seventeenth-century English Feminists. University of Illinois Press. ISBN 978-0-252-00912-9.
- Smith, Hilda L., ed. (1998). Women Writers and the Early Modern British Political Tradition. Cambridge University Press. ISBN 978-0-521-58509-5.
- Smith, Hilda L.; Carroll, Berenice A., eds. (2000). Women's Political & Social Thought: An Anthology. Indiana University Press. ISBN 978-0-253-33758-0.
- Smith, Hilda L. (2010). All Men and Both Sexes: Gender, Politics, and the False Universal in England, 1640-1832. Penn State Press. ISBN 978-0-271-04604-4.
- Smith, Hilda L.; Zook, Melinda S., eds. (2018). Generations of Women Historians: Within and Beyond the Academy. Springer. ISBN 978-3-319-77568-5.
