= Catherine Clinton =

American historian

- Born: 1952 (age 73–74); Seattle, Washington, U.S.
- Awards: Guggenheim Fellowship; 2016

Academic background
- Education: Harvard University (BA); University of Sussex (MA); Princeton University (PhD)
- Doctoral advisor: James M. McPherson

Academic work
- Discipline: Historian
- Sub-discipline: American Civil War; African-American history; Women's history
- Institutions: University of Texas at San Antonio

Catherine Clinton (born 1952 in Seattle, Washington) is an American historian who is the Denman Professor of American History at the University of Texas at San Antonio. She specializes in American history, particularly the history of the Southern United States, the American Civil War, American women, and African-American history.Guggenheim Fellowship

== Career ==
Clinton grew up in Kansas City, Missouri, where she graduated from the Sunset Hill School in 1969. She studied sociology and African-American history at Harvard University (Lowell House). After graduating in 1973, she went on to receive her Master of Arts from the University of Sussex. In 1980, she earned a Ph.D. from Princeton University, completing her dissertation under the direction of James M. McPherson.

She has held academic positions at Union College, Harvard University, Brandeis University, Brown University, Wofford College, The University of Richmond, Wesleyan University, Queen's University, Belfast, Baruch College of the City University of New York and The Citadel. She currently holds a chair in American History at UTSA.

She has written for the History Channel, consulted on projects for WGBH, and is a member of the Screen Writers Guild, and has authored, edited, co-authored or co-edited more than 25 books. She is editor of a series titled Viewpoints on American Culture (Oxford University Press).

She serves on the scholarly advisory board of both Ford's Theatre and the Lincoln Cottage. She also serves on the editorial boards of the journals Civil War Times and Civil War History.

She has been an advisor on several documentaries, including Brother, Outsider: The life of Bayard Rustin and Rebel: Loreta Velasquez, Civil War Soldier and Spy (about Loreta Janeta Velásquez), as well as Steven Spielberg's Lincoln (2011).

== Personal life ==
Clinton lives in San Antonio, Texas.

== Selected works ==
- The Plantation Mistress: Woman's World in the Old South (Pantheon, 1982)
- The Other Civil War: American Women in the Nineteenth Century (1984, 2nd edition, New York: Hill and Wang, 1999)
- Divided Houses: Gender and the Civil War [Co-editor] (New York: Oxford University Press, 1992)
- Half-Sisters of History: Southern Women and the American Past [editor] (Durham, N.C.: Duke University Press, 1994)
- Tara Revisited: Woman, War, & the Plantation Legend (Abbeville, 1995)
- Life in Civil War America [commissioned by the National Park Service] (Eastern National Press, 1996)
- The Devil's Lane: Sex and Race in the Early South, Catherine Clinton and Michele Gillespie, eds. (New York: Oxford University Press, 1997)
- Civil War Stories (Athens: University of Georgia Press, 1998) Averitt Lecture Series, Georgia Southern University
- Taking Off the White Gloves: Southern Women and Women's History, Michele Gillespie and Catherine Clinton, eds. (Columbia, MO 1998)
- I, Too, Sing America: Three Centuries of African American Poetry [editor] (Boston: Houghton Mifflin Children, 1998)
- Portraits of American Women: From Settlement to the Present [co-editor] (1991, reprint edition, Oxford University Press, 1998)
- Taking Off the White Gloves: Southern Women and Women Historians [co-editor] (Columbia: University of Missouri Press, 1998)
- Public Women and the Confederacy (Marquette University Press, 1999), Frank B. Klement Lecture, Marquette University.
- The Scholastic Encyclopedia of the Civil War (author) (New York: Scholastic Press, 1999)
- Columbia Guide to American Women in the Nineteenth Century [co-author] (New York: Columbia University Press, 2000)
- Fanny Kemble's Journals (Cambridge, MA, 2000)
- Southern Families at War: Loyalty and Conflict in the Civil War South [editor] (New York: Oxford University Press, 2000)
- The Black Soldier (Boston: Houghton Mifflin Children, 2000)
- Fanny Kemble's Civil Wars (Simon & Schuster, 2000)
- A Poem of Her Own: Women's Voices Past and Present (New York: Harry Abrams, 2003)
- Harriet Tubman: The Road to Freedom (Little, Brown and Company, 2004)
- Battle Scars: Gender and Sexuality in the Civil War [co-editor] (Oxford University Press, 2006)
- Reminiscences of My Life in Camp: An African-American Woman's Civil War Memoir (University of Georgia Press, 2006)
- Hold the Flag High (New York: HarperCollins Children, 2005)
- Mrs. Lincoln: A Life (HarperCollins, 2009)
- Booth (under the name C. C. Colbert). Illustrated by Tanitoc (New York: First Second Books, 2010)
- Mary Chesnut's Diary [editor] (Penguin, 2011)
