= Collier =

Collier or colliers may refer to:

== Coal industry ==
- Collier, coal miner or coal merchant
- Colliery, coal mining and selling; or a coal mine
- Collier (ship), a bulk cargo ship which carried coal
- Charcoal maker, in colonial United States and also in Sussex, England

== Places ==
- Collier Row, a place in the London Borough of Havering
- Colliers Wood, an area in the London Borough of Merton
- Collier County, Florida, a county of Florida's southwest coast
- Collier, Georgia, an unincorporated community
- Colliers, West Virginia, a small town in the northern panhandle area of West Virginia
- Colliers, Newfoundland and Labrador, a town on the Avalon Peninsula
- Collier Township, Allegheny County, Pennsylvania, a suburb of Pittsburgh
- Collier Range National Park, Australian park
- Collier High School (New Jersey), a school in Wickatunk, New Jersey

== People ==
- Collier (surname)
- Collier Twentyman Smithers (1867–1943), British portrait artist

== Other ==
- Collier Baronets, a title in the British honours system
- Collier Books, a publishing imprint of Macmillan Publishing Company
- Collier's Encyclopedia, a U.S. encyclopedia
- Collier Motors, the last auto dealer in the U.S. under the American Motors banner
- Collier (necklace), a type of necklace, possibly a synonym for choker
- Collier Trophy, a prestigious award in American aviation
- Collier's, a U.S. magazine published between 1888 and 1957
- Colliers (company), commercial real estate services company
- Colliers Wood United F.C., an English association football club
