= Lorri Glover =

American scholar

Lorri Glover is an American scholar who holds the John Francis Bannon Endowed Chair in the Department of History at Saint Louis University. She specializes in the social history of the English colonies and the creation of the American Republic.

== Education ==
Glover earned a B.S. from the University of North Alabama in 1990, an M.A., from Clemson University in 1992, and a Ph.D. from the University of Kentucky in 1996.

== Selected works ==
- Eliza Lucas Pinckney: An Independent Woman in the Age of Revolution (Yale University Press, 2020)
- Reinterpreting Southern Histories: Essays in Historiography, co-edited with Craig Thompson Friend (Louisiana State University Press, 2020)
- Discovering the American Past: A Look at the Evidence, co-authored with William Bruce Wheeler (Cengage Learning, 2017)
- The Fate of the Revolution: Virginians Debate the Constitution (Johns Hopkins University Press, 2016)
- Founders as Fathers: The Private Lives and Politics of the American Revolutionaries (Yale University Press, 2014)
- Death and the American South, co-edited with Craig Thompson Friend (Cambridge University Press, 2014)
- The Shipwreck that Saved Jamestown: The Sea Venture Castaways and the Fate of America, co-author with Daniel Blake Smith (Henry Holt Publishers, 2008)
- Southern Sons: Becoming Men in the New Nation (Johns Hopkins University Press, 2007)
- Southern Manhood: Perspectives on Masculinity in the Old South, co-edited with Craig Thompson Friend (University of Georgia Press, 2004)
- All Our Relations: Blood Ties and Emotional Bonds Among the Early South Carolina Gentry (Johns Hopkins University Press, 2000)
