= Lugenia Burns Hope =

American activist (1871–1947)

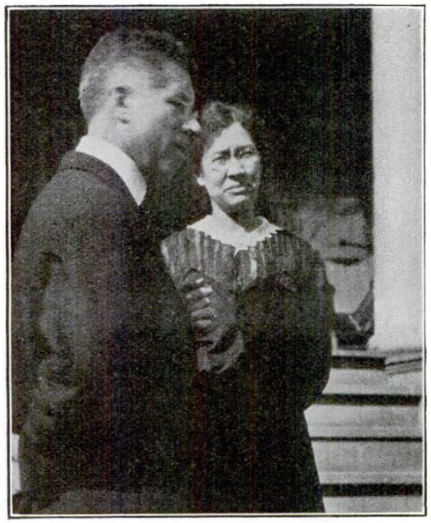
- John and Lugenia Burns Hope
- Born: February 19, 1874; St. Louis, Missouri, U.S.
- Died: August 14, 1947 (aged 76); Nashville, Tennessee, U.S.
- Occupation: Political activist
- Spouse: John Hope

Lugenia Burns Hope (February 19, 1871 – August 14, 1947), was a social reformer whose Neighborhood Union and other community service organizations improved the quality of life for African Americans in Atlanta, Georgia, and served as a model for the future Civil Rights Movement.

== Biography ==
=== Education and social outreach ===
Lugenia Burns was born in St. Louis, Missouri, February 19, 1871. Her parents were Louisa M. Bertha and Ferdinand Burns; her father was a carpenter. She was the youngest of seven children. When her father died suddenly, her mother to move the family to Chicago.

Throughout her youth, Lugenia Burns worked for various charitable organizations, inspiring a lifelong interest in social outreach work. Between 1890 and 1893, she studied at the Chicago Art Institute, the Chicago School of Design (now also part of the Art Institute of Chicago), and the Chicago Business College. Lugenia Burns married John Hope in 1897 and moved with him to Atlanta when he joined the faculty of the Atlanta Baptist College (now Morehouse College); he was later appointed the institution's president in 1906. With the help of Morehouse students, she surveyed local area residents about their needs for community development projects, which eventually led to the college providing day care, kindergarten, and recreational programs. Her community involvement led her in 1908 to create the Neighborhood Union, the first woman-run social welfare agency for African Americans in Atlanta, which provided medical, recreational, employment, and educational services and became known for its community building and race and gender activism. Hope served as head of its Board of Managers until 1936.

=== Activism ===
Because the United Service Organization limited its entertainment program in World War II, the Neighborhood Union ran YWCA War Work Councils to provide similar services to the African-American community. Their success led to Lugenia Hope coordinating a US-wide network of Hostess Houses that provided services ranging from recreational programs to relocation counseling to African American and Jewish soldiers and their families.

A founding member of the Atlanta branch of the National Association of Colored Women's Clubs, Hope became involved in reform activities nationwide, such as her 1920 effort to end segregation and white-domination within the national YWCA. Her statement to white women who opposed full equality in the YWCA for African-American women was: "Ignorance is ignorance wherever found, yet the most ignorant white woman may enjoy every privilege that America offers. Now ...the ignorant Negro woman should also enjoy them."

An innovative thinker on racial politics, Hope criticized the common belief that African American needed to prove their worthiness as citizens, and as vice president of the National Association for the Advancement of Colored People of Atlanta organized six-week courses on voting, democracy, and the U.S. Constitution. This work was later copied across the country, and these classes became part of the early stages of the Civil Rights Movement.

=== Death ===
Hope became ill in 1936, the same year her husband died. She spent the rest of her life in New York City, Chicago, and Nashville. She died August 14, 1947, in Nashville, Tennessee, and her ashes were spread from the tower at Morehouse. She was posthumously inducted into the Georgia Women of Achievement in 1996.
