= Mary Milligan =

American religious scholar (1935–2011)

Sister Mary Milligan RSHM
- Title: General Superior

Personal life
- Born: January 23, 1935 Los Angeles, California, U.S.
- Died: April 2, 2011 (aged 76)
- Education: Pontifical Gregorian University; L’Université de Paris; St. Mary's College; Marymount College

Religious life
- Religion: Roman Catholic
- Institute: Religious of the Sacred Heart of Mary
- Profession: Theologian; religious leader; professor; provost

Senior posting
- Period in office: 1980–1985

Mary Milligan RSHM (January 23, 1935 – April 2, 2011) was an American theologian, a university administrator, and a member of the Religious of the Sacred Heart of Mary (RSHM) who served as the tenth general superior of the Institute of the RSHM (1980–1985). She was the first general superior of that religious order who was born in the United States. In 1987, she was appointed by the Vatican as special secretary to the International Synod of Bishops on the Laity as one of three U.S. experts. While undertaking that task, she lobbied for a stronger role for women within the Catholic Church. She served Loyola Marymount University as a professor, as provost, and subsequently as Dean of Bellarmine College of Liberal Arts. She went on to serve on the board of St. John's Seminary in Camarillo, California, and taught theology to seminarians.

== Early life and education ==
Milligan was the second child of Bernard Milligan, a columnist and sportswriter, and Carolyn (Krebs) Milligan. She had three siblings, an older sister Pat, a younger sister Jeri, and a younger brother Mike. They lived in the San Fernando Valley region of California, and she attended St. Charles Borromeo Church and grammar school. There she was taught by Sisters of Charity of the Blessed Virgin Mary, including Sr. Jean Dolores Schmidt. Fellow parishioners or classmates who would also enter religious life and play significant roles in Milligan's life include Cardinal Roger Mahoney, and Fr. Thomas Rausch, S.J. She went on to attend Corvallis High School, which was run by RSHM sisters who inspired her to join that religious order.

== Religious life and career ==
=== Formation and further education ===
In 1953, she entered the RSHM Eastern American Novitiate in Tarrytown, New York and was later sent to the International Novitiate in Béziers, France. She took her first vows in 1955, taking the name Sr. Bernard Marie Milligan in honor of her father, Bernard. During her novitiate, she earned a BA in French from Marymount College (1956). Fluency in French, developed both in the classroom and during her time living and working in France, became an important skill underlying much of her subsequent work.

After completing her novitiate, she was sent to teach in American, Irish, and French schools in Neuilly, a suburb just outside Paris. During this time, she also earned a Ph.D. in English at the L’Université de Paris (1959). After completing her doctorate, she returned to the U.S. and began teaching at Loyola Marymount University, but visited France again in 1960 before taking her final vows in California. In 1966, she earned an MA in sacred scripture from St. Mary's College in Indiana, which was the first Catholic college in the U.S. to offer advanced degrees in theology to women.

=== Leadership within the RSHM ===
Sr. Mary Milligan was elected general councilor and served in that role from 1969 to 1975. In the Perfectae Caritatis document issued during the Second Vatican Council, religious orders had been urged to review their roots and the intentions of their founders and to contemplate how the order might adapt to the needs of the contemporary world. That work was ongoing as Milligan went to Rome and joined the general council. Sr. Patricia Connor, RSHM observed, "Totally fluent in French, steeped in French history and French culture, and deeply knowledgeable of French spirituality, past and present, she was uniquely able to lead us to discover anew our mid-nineteenth century French Founder, Father Jean Gailhac, and French Foundress, Mother St. Jean Cure Pelissier, and our first sisters and to help us understand them at a depth we had never known before." That understanding of the order's history allowed Milligan to take a primary role in drafting the revision of the Institute's constitutions, which was approved by the general chapter of the Institute in August 1980 and then by the Vatican's Sacred Congregation for Religious and Secular Institutes.

While in Rome, she also earned a Doctor of Sacred Theology degree from the Pontifical Gregorian University in Rome (1975); she and classmate Sr. Sandra Schneiders, IHM were the first women to do so. Her dissertation, That They May Have Life: A Study of the Spirit-charism of Father Jean Gailhac traced the history of the order from its founding in Beziers, France in 1849 up through the establishing of American provinces in the early twentieth century.

Milligan was elected superior general of the RSHM in 1980, the tenth woman to hold that role and the first born in the United States of America. This necessitated her return to Rome. In 1983, she began a dialogue with Pope John Paul II and the International Union of Superiors General concerning the role of women in the local Church and the relationship between women in religious life and bishops.

=== Academic career ===
In 1986, Milligan returned from Rome to the United States. She then served as provost of Loyola Marymount University (LMU) from 1986 to 89. She also served as a professor of theology at LMU and as president of the board at St. John's Seminary in Camarillo. She served as the dean of the Bellarmine College of Liberal Arts of Loyola Marymount University from 1992 to 97. She also served as a trustee of the university from 1987 to 2006.

=== Leadership within the larger Church ===
Sr. Mary Milligan was appointed by the Vatican in 1987 as special secretary to the International Synod of Bishops on the Laity on "The Vocation and Mission of the Laity in the Church Twenty Years after the Second Vatican Council." She also played a significant role in the Synod process for the Diocese of Los Angeles (1987–89) and co-wrote the final draft that outlined the future direction of the diocese. On the occasion of her death, Cardinal Roger Mahoney, a childhood friend, an important ally during her career, and the presider at her funeral, noted that "she was an active member of our Archdiocesan Synod, playing a vital role in the formulation of our Synod Documents as a member of the Synod Writing Commission.”

== Honors ==
In 1988, Milligan was awarded an honorary doctorate from Marymount University in Arlington, VA. Phyllis Zagano dedicated her book Twentieth Century Apostles: Contemporary Spirituality in Action to Mary Milligan, "who years ago explained the meaning of not a few words to me, especially 'apostle' and 'zeal'."

=== Mary Milligan, R.S.H.M. Lecture in Spirituality ===
In 2013, Loyola Marymount University's Department of Theological Studies established the Mary Milligan, R.S.H.M. Lecture in Spirituality. The lecture is given annually, and provides a forum for critical reflection on spirituality in service to the Church, the academy and the world, in keeping with the RSHM charism “that all may have life and have it to the full.” Past speakers have included Sandra M. Schneiders, IHM, Elizabeth Johnson, Ronald Rolheiser, OMI, M. Shawn Copeland, Diane Bergant, C.S.A., Kristy Nabhan-Warren, Maria Clara Bingemer, Susan Abraham, and Kwok Pui-lan.

== Selected works ==
- Sheila Kaye-Smith, 1887–1956 (thesis/dissertation, L’Université de Paris, 1959).
- That They May Have Life: a Study of the Spirit-Charism of Father Jean Gailhac, Founder (Gregorian University Press, Roma, 1975).
- "Inculturation, Feminism, and the Dialogue with Rome" in Women in the Church I edited by Madonna Kolbenschlag, (Washington, D.C: The Pastoral Press, 1987) ISBN 0-912405-39-2
- A Journey in Faith and Time: History of the Religious of the Sacred Heart of Mary 4 vols. with Rosa do Carmo Sampaio, RSHM and Kathleen Connell, RSHM, (Religious of the Sacred Heart of Mary, 1992).
- "The Development of Religious Life in the United States from its European Roots" in The American Catholic Heritage : Reflections on the Growth and Influence of the Catholic Church in the United States (Rome Italy : Pontifical North American College, 1992).
- "Christian Spirituality" in College Student's Introduction to Theology edited by Thomas P. Rausch, (Collegeville, MN: The Liturgical Press, 1993).
- Women and Jurisdiction: An Unfolding Reality with Anne Munley, IHM; Rosemary Smith, SC; Helen Maher Garvey, BVM; and Lois MacGillivray, SNJM(Leadership Conference of Women Religious Study of Selected Church Leadership Roles, 2001).
- "Tell Us Mary, What Have You Seen Along the Way": A Memoir (Montebello, CA: Religious of the Sacred Heart of Mary, 2009).
