= Jean Dolores Schmidt =

American Religious sister and sports chaplain (1919–2025)

Jean Dolores Schmidt BVM
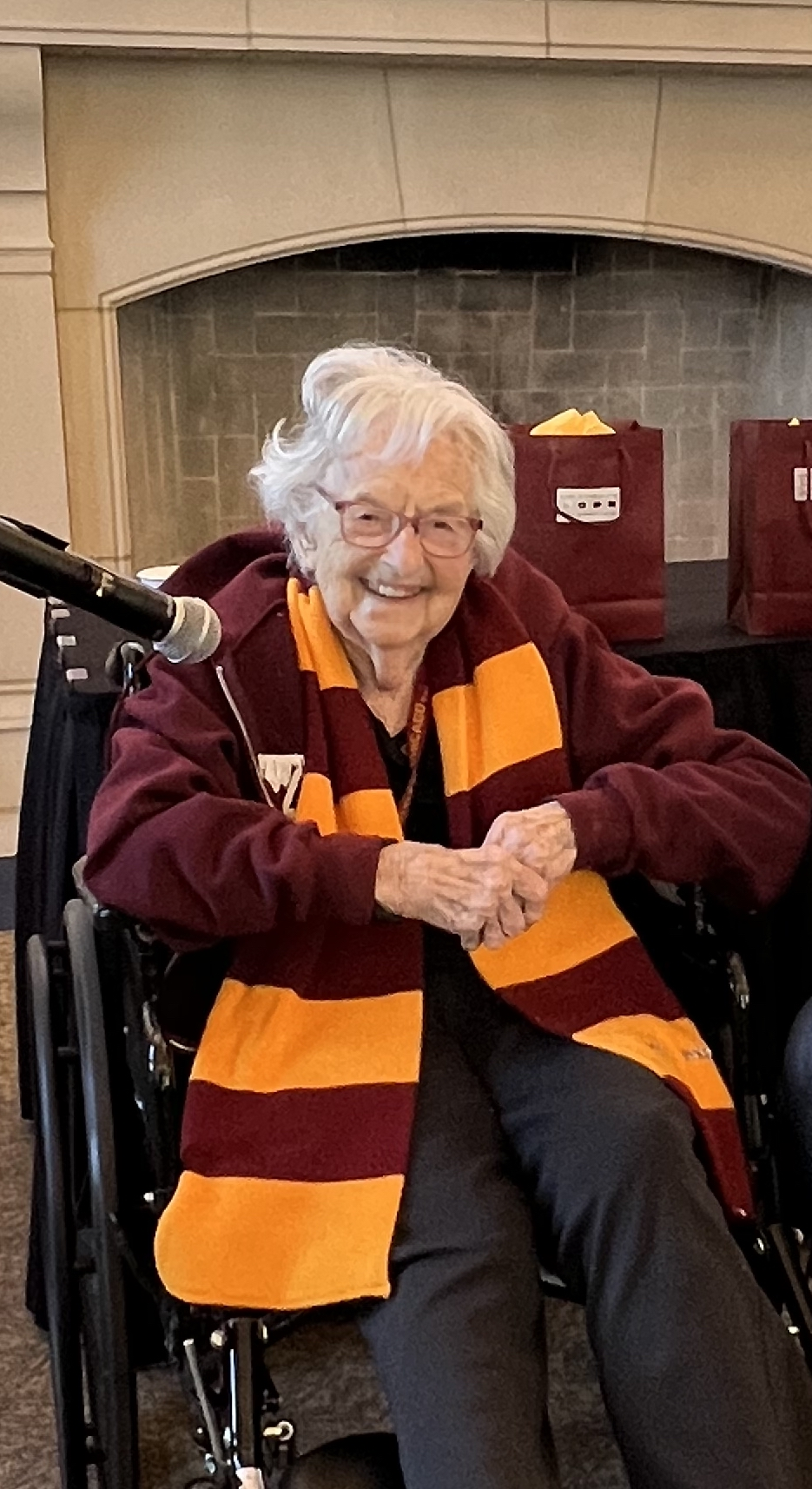
- Schmidt in 2023

Personal life
- Born: Dolores Bertha Schmidt; August 21, 1919 San Francisco, California, United States
- Died: October 9, 2025 (aged 106) Chicago, Illinois, United States
- Education: Mount St. Mary's College (BA); Loyola University of Los Angeles (MA)
- Known for: Loyola Ramblers men's basketball team chaplain

Religious life
- Religion: Roman Catholic
- Institute: Sisters of Charity of the Blessed Virgin Mary

Jean Dolores Schmidt, BVM (August 21, 1919 – October 9, 2025), better known as Sister Jean, was an American religious sister and a member of the Sisters of Charity of the Blessed Virgin Mary, as well as the chaplain for the Loyola Ramblers men's basketball team at Loyola University Chicago.

== Early life ==
Jean Dolores Schmidt was born as Dolores Bertha Schmidt on August 21, 1919, in San Francisco, California, and raised in the Eureka Valley neighborhood. She first considered becoming a Religious Sister while she was in the third grade. As a student at St. Paul's High School, she played on the girls basketball team at a time the sport was beginning to be promoted for girls. After graduating from high school in 1937, she entered the Sisters of Charity of the Blessed Virgin Mary in Iowa and was received into their novitiate in 1938, being given the religious name Jean Dolores. In 1941, she returned to teach in California. Sister Jean completed her Bachelor of Arts at Mount St. Mary's College (now Mount St. Mary's University in Los Angeles) in 1949 and Master of Arts at Loyola University of Los Angeles (now Loyola Marymount University) in 1961.

== Career ==
Sister Jean began teaching at St. Bernard School in Glassell Park, California, before she was sent to St. Charles Borromeo School in North Hollywood, California in 1946. Several students from her teaching days at St. Charles later entered religious life, including Roger Cardinal Mahony, Thomas Rausch, SJ, and Mary Milligan, RSHM.

In 1961, Sister Jean was sent from California to teach at Mundelein College in Chicago. During the mid-1960s, she was active in the civil rights movement. In 1991, she began work at Loyola after a merger with Mundelein. Three years later, she became the team chaplain for the Ramblers men's basketball team. Providing a mix of spiritual and scouting support during her time with the team, she inspired her own bobblehead doll in 2011 and was honored with a "Sister Jean Day" on December 1, 2012. Loyola has also produced a "Sr. Jean Superfan" pin.

In 2016, she was presented with an honorary doctorate from Loyola for 50 years of service to the university.

=== NCAA men's basketball tournaments ===
Sister Jean gained overnight publicity outside the Loyola community after the Ramblers' upset of Miami in the 2018 NCAA men's basketball tournament. Her fame continued to grow after the team upset Tennessee in the round of 32, sending Loyola to their first Sweet 16 appearance in 33 years. The then-98-year-old nun quickly became a star in the tournament, with her bobblehead selling for more than $300 online. Loyola ultimately advanced to the Final Four for the first time since 1963, but were defeated by Michigan in the semifinal game.

Sister Jean again drew national attention when Loyola appeared in the 2021 tournament. She had initially been barred from appearing at the tournament due to COVID-19 pandemic restrictions, but was later cleared after she received a COVID-19 vaccine. After reaching the round of 32 as an 8-seed, she incorporated a scouting report into her opening prayer for the game against the top-seeded Illinois Fighting Illini, a team she was reluctant to play against because she did not want to cheer against another Illinois team. The Ramblers went on to upset the Illini, 71–58.

She made an appearance at the 2022 tournament after Loyola qualified for the tournament, with USA Today noting she was still in good health. Despite again leading the team in pre-game prayer before their first-round game against Ohio State, the Ramblers were eliminated.

=== Centenarian and birthday celebrations ===
Sister Jean became a centenarian on August 21, 2019, with Illinois Governor JB Pritzker proclaiming it "Sister Jean Day" across the state of Illinois.

On August 21, 2022, the plaza outside the Loyola CTA station was dedicated to Sister Jean in commemoration of her 103rd birthday.

As Schmidt celebrated her 105th birthday, she identified the secrets to living a long life as "loving others and God, taking care of your mind and body, and interacting with young people". She would also receive a proclamation from US President Joe Biden, in recognition of her lifetime of service.

In 2026, on what would have been her 107th birthday, Loyola unveiled a statue of Sister Jean on the west quad lawn.

== Retirement and death ==
In September 2025, The Loyola Phoenix reported that Schmidt retired from all of her campus duties at Loyola due to health reasons, including being the chaplain of the men's basketball team. This retirement was first announced in a press statement upon her 106th birthday, but she had been noted as being absent from basketball tournaments as early as the previous spring. Despite this, Schmidt said in a Hoops HQ interview with the co-author of her memoir, Seth Davis, that she intended to return to work upon being cleared. She additionally stated that the health setbacks were due to falling from her wheelchair in the spring and dealing with a summer cold, but she was gradually recovering.

On October 9, 2025, Schmidt died at the age of 106.
