= Mary Keller =

Mary Keller is the name of:

- Mary Kenneth Keller (1913–1985), American Roman Catholic nun, educator, and computer scientist
- Mary Page Keller (born 1961), American actress
