= Blanche Marie Gallagher =

American Roman Catholic nun (1922–2010)

Blanche Marie Gallagher BVM

Personal life
- Born: August 28, 1922 Waverly, Iowa
- Died: November 19, 2010 (aged 88)

Religious life
- Religion: Roman Catholicism

Blanche Marie Gallagher (1922–2010) was an American Roman Catholic nun, painter, and art professor. She was notable for her paintings influenced by the writings of French philosopher and Jesuit priest Pierre Teilhard de Chardin, and she was profiled by the academic journal The Teilhard Review in 1976. Her papers are at Loyola University Chicago, and at the Smithsonian's Archives of American Art. She was chair of the art department at Mundelein College in Chicago.

== Youth, education, and entrance into religious life ==
She was born Patricia Jane Gallagher on August 28, 1922 in Waverly, Iowa, to Blanche Jacobson Gallagher and John Joseph Gallagher Sr. She spent two years at Clarke College (now university) in Dubuque, Iowa, as an interior design major, but reported dissatisfaction with uniforms and a rural campus. She transferred to Mundelein College in Chicago, now part of Loyola University Chicago, majoring in art with a philosophy minor, and graduating in 1944. She supplemented her coursework with classes at the Art Institute of Chicago, where she said she was able to study life drawing with nude models, something not possible on her private Catholic campus. On the night of February 2, 1943, she reported a mystic experience:

...I awakened to a Presence. I knew that | was invited to an espousal relationship with this Presence. I just knew; I didn’t know how | knew. It was a voice, a knowing, nothing that I could doubt. I suggested to that voice that it had come to the wrong bed, for my roommate... often said the rosary at night, kneeling by the side of her bed. I was not at all 'holy,' and I surely had other plans. This experience absolutely was not The Dream [of marriage and children], and it couldn’t have come at a more bewildering time.

She entered the Sisters of Charity of the Blessed Virgin Mary the same year, accepting a name change to sister Mary Blanche Marie. The name happened to include her mother's (she wrote that she did not choose it), and her mother, not Catholic, took consolation in it. Gallagher said she found the two versions of Mary repetitive, and thus did not use the first one. She received an MFA from Catholic University of America in Washington, DC, in 1956. She also studied at the Giorgio Cini Foundation in Venice, Italy.

== Work as an artist and scholar, and influences ==
Beginning in the 1960s she was close friends with Passionist priest, author, and ecotheologian Thomas Berry CP. When he was president of the American Teilhard Association, he encouraged her study of Pierre Teilhard de Chardin SJ. Gallagher's colleague Brian Swimme described meeting Berry for the first time after inviting him to Chicago, introducing him to Matthew Fox, and taking them both to Gallagher's apartment in Chicago circa 1981, because she had offered to facilitate introductions since she knew everyone in the group. Swimme wrote of how she and Berry "whooped with joy upon seeing one another." As Berry admired her paintings on the walls, he said "So this is where you dream your dreams... This is where you paint your visions." Swimme described that visit to Chicago, including the time in her apartment, as when he knew he wanted to follow Berry's path.

Before this meeting Fox, who was then still a Dominican priest, had invited Gallagher to join him and Swimme on the faculty of what was then known as the Institute in Culture and Creation Spirituality (ICCS) at Mundelein College, inspired by thinkers such as Mechthild of Magdeburg, Julian of Norwich, Teresa of Ávila, Meister Eckhart, Hildegard of Bingen, and Alfred North Whitehead. Berry became what Gallagher described as an "indefatigable supporter" of the program, which offered a master's degree in Creation Spirituality. Gallagher taught painting, including a course in "Painting as Meditation," about which Fox wrote extensively in his 1983 book Original Blessing, calling her his teacher, and again in his 2015 book Confessions. Other faculty included two biblical theologians, Mary Anne Hoope BVM and Helen Kenik, Jungian analyst John Giannini, Paul Steinmetz, artist Ken Feit, liturgical dance practitioner Tria Thompson CSA, feminist philosopher and theologian Rosemary Radford Ruether, Rabbi Byron Sherwin, and spiritual director Mary Ann Walsh OP, and Passionist priest Carroll Stuhlmueller. Fox described how then-Cardinal Ratzinger, when he was the head of the Congregation for the Doctrine of the Faith, investigated both him and the program; Ratzinger's quarrels with the ICCS eventually led to Fox's dismissal from the Dominicans, and his turn to the Episcopal church, where he remains.

Gallagher studied Hindu and Buddhist spiritualities, engaging them with Teilhard's cosmology. At the time, Jesuits at Loyola University Chicago who were her friends told her that they were forbidden to read Teilhard, which she said made his writings even more intriguing to her. She did a series of Japanese poem paintings that were exhibited.

In 1988 she published her translation of Teilhard's Meditations.

== Death and legacy ==
She died on November 19, 2010, after a brief illness. Loyola University Chicago has a Blanche Marie Gallagher, B.V.M. Endowed Scholarship in her name, to be given annually to a graduate student in its Institute of Pastoral Studies.
