= Margaret Feldner =

American academic administrator and nun

Sr. Margaret Feldner, O.S.F., Ph.D., served as Quincy University's 21st president. Feldner assumed the post January 1, 2004. She was the first woman president appointed to the role at Quincy. On December 19, 2006, the university announced that Feldner had been excused from her duties following a vote of no confidence by the school's faculty, a move precipitated by a 30% decrease in freshmen enrollment over two years. Sr. Margaret earned the nickname "Head Nun" while occupying the office of President at Quincy University.

In 2009, after working with the Excel program in Okolona, Feldner served at The Dwelling Place Retreat and Prayer Center in rural eastern Mississippi. The Dwelling Place Retreat and prayer center operated primarily from mobile home units and during her time there Feldner secured a $20,000.00 grant to refurbish the dining room. In 2011, Feldner resigned from her position.

Feldner previously served as Vice President for Academic Affairs and Academic Dean at Clarke College in Dubuque, Iowa, a post she held since 2000. A member of Franciscan Sisters of the Holy Family, Feldner has served in many administrative and instructional capacities in the field of education. At the collegiate level, Feldner has served as a department chair of education at both Briar Cliff College (1992-1997) and Clarke College (1997-2000). Feldner has served as project director for a number of grants and has extensive experience in the development and implementation of academic assessment strategies.

During her career, Feldner has taught at the graduate, undergraduate, secondary and elementary school levels. At the collegiate level, she has taught at Clarke College (1985-1990 and 1997-2000), University of Dayton (1990-1992) and Briar Cliff College (1992-1997). Feldner taught C.C.D. (Confraternity of Christian Doctrine) classes at the secondary level from 1965 to 1978. She served as assistant to the superintendent of schools for the Archdiocese of Dubuque (1984-1990), and as an educational consultant for the Archdiocese of Portland (1982-1984). Feldner taught at the elementary school level from 1958 to 1978 and served as a principal for an elementary school in Oregon from 1978 to 1982.

Feldner earned a Ph.D. in educational leadership from the University of Dayton (Ohio) in 1994, and a master's degree in guidance and counseling with an endorsement in administration and supervision from DePaul University (Chicago) in 1974. She earned a B.A. from Briar Cliff College (Sioux City, Iowa) in 1967.
