= Joanne Marrow =

American clinical psychologist and professor (1945–2014)

- Born: January 22, 1945; Chicago, Illinois, U.S.
- Died: June 24, 2014 (aged 69); Grass Valley, California, U.S.
- Occupations: Clinical psychologist; author
- Spouse: Itara O'Connell (m. 2008)

Academic background
- Education: Mundelein College (BA); Florida State University (PhD)

Academic work
- Discipline: Clinical psychology
- Institutions: California State University, Sacramento

Joanne Marrow (January 22, 1945 – June 24, 2014) was an American clinical psychologist, author, feminist, and advocate of LGBT rights. She was a tenured professor of psychology at California State University, Sacramento (CSUS), where she taught the psychology of women and human sexuality for 30 years. She helped establish Women Escaping a Violent Environment (WEAVE), a Sacramento-based shelter for women who are victims of domestic abuse.

Marrow became part of a nationwide discussion in the United States regarding the limits of academic freedom, after a guest lecture she delivered to an undergraduate psychology class at CSUS in December 1994 resulted in a student filing a $2.5 million sexual harassment claim against the university due to its content and presentation.

== Early life and education ==
Marrow was born on January 22, 1945, in Chicago, Illinois to Albin and Genevieve Marrow. She had three sisters: Madeline, Celeste, and Claudia, and a brother, Philip. In 1964, after graduating high school, Marrow joined a convent founded by the Maryknoll Sisters in Valley Park, Missouri. She lived there as a Roman Catholic novice (nun-in-training) for over two years; according to Marrow, she left the convent after her novice mistress "told me it was God's will that I leave", returning to her family in Chicago on July 21, 1966. She went on to graduate from Chicago's Mundelein College with a Bachelor of Arts in sociology, and earned her PhD in clinical psychology from Florida State University in Tallahassee, Florida.

== Career ==
Starting from 1974, Marrow was a tenured professor of the psychology department at California State University, Sacramento (CSUS), where she taught classes on the psychology of women and human sexuality for three decades. She concurrently ran a private practice as a clinical psychologist. In 1997, she published the book Changing Positions: Women Speak Out on Sex and Desire.

=== December 1994 guest lecture ===
My educational objective is to break the secrecy around women's sexuality in a society that encourages silence and repression. If we can't talk about these things in a university, where can we talk about them?

— Marrow on the subject matter of her December 1994 guest lecture

In December 1994, Marrow delivered a guest lecture on human sexuality to an undergraduate psychology class at CSUS, in which she discussed female masturbation, sex toys, and her own sexual experiences; made jokes about male genitalia and penis size; presented slides featuring images of female children's genitalia; and showed images of a vulva before and after childbirth. One of the students in attendance, 33-year-old Craig Rogers, filed a $2.5 million sexual harassment claim against the university, stating that the lecture had caused him "mental anguish, pain and suffering, loss of concentration and emotional distress". He said that Marrow used the lecture to impose her views regarding "a certain type of lifestyle", and stated that he felt "raped and trapped", as he "was being aroused [by the content of the lecture] and didn't want it". He also stated that the presentation affected him to the point that he sought counseling from his pastor.

The course's regular professor, William Westbrook, reportedly prepared students weeks in advance for the lecture, and Marrow herself informed them that she uses "very blunt and direct language" and for students to leave the classroom if they felt they would be uncomfortable. Rogers initially left, but returned after learning that some of the material would appear on their final exam. Marrow stated that she received positive feedback on the lecture from around a dozen female students who were in attendance, who told her after the class had ended "what a wonderful lecture it was". Marrow's lawyer, John Poswall, argued that the intent of Marrow's lecture was to communicate "that not only should women learn to enjoy their bodies without shame or guilt, but men can learn to be better sexual partners to the women they love"; however, Rogers' lawyer, Kathleen Smith, referred to the lecture as being in violation of CSUS's sexual harassment code, which contained prohibitions on "sexually explicit or sexist" statements and "display of sexually explicit pictures".

Once Rogers' claim against CSUS had been made public knowledge in March 1995, the incident became the subject of national newspaper, television, and radio news reports, and initiated discussions regarding the limits of academic freedom in universities. CSUS ultimately ruled against Rogers, finding that the content and presentation of Marrow's lecture was not severe enough to have constituted "an intimidating, hostile or offensive learning environment".

== Personal life ==
Marrow was a lesbian, and married her wife Itara O'Connell on September 30, 2008. In 1995, Marrow stated that she was no longer a practicing Catholic, adding "My spirituality has evolved and transformed into something much more universal." She had an interest in Tibetan Buddhism, and was a devotee of the Hindu spiritual leader Mata Amritanandamayi. Marrow's hobbies included watercolor painting, gardening, backpacking, kayaking, science, and reading.

== Death ==
Marrow died on June 24, 2014, in Grass Valley, California, after living with metastatic renal cell carcinoma for 12 years.
