= Corvallis High School (California) =

- Corvallis High School c. 1981–82

Location
- 3921 Laurel Canyon Boulevard; Studio City, California; United States
- 34°08′30″N 118°23′41″W

Information
- Other name: Our Lady of Corvallis High School
- School type: Private, High school
- Religious affiliations: Catholic Church; Religious of the Sacred Heart of Mary
- Established: 1941
- Closed: 1987
- Gender: All girls

Corvallis High School, also known as Our Lady of Corvallis High School, was a Catholic girls high school located in Studio City, Los Angeles, California that operated between 1941 and 1987. The campus is now being used by the Bridges Academy.

== History ==
Corvallis, Our Lady of Corvallis High School, (all girls) was the oldest Catholic High School in the San Fernando Valley until its closure in 1987. It was operated by the sisters of the Religious of the Sacred Heart of Mary (RSHM). The school was located at 3921 Laurel Canyon Boulevard in Studio City, California just south of Ventura Boulevard. The campus is now occupied by Bridges Academy.

In 1941, there were no Catholic high schools in the San Fernando Valley, only elementary schools. Archbishop John J. Cantwell asked the Religious of the Sacred Heart of Mary (RSHM) to establish the Valley's first high school. Reverend Mother M. Baptiste Holohan and Reverend Mother Gertrude Cain began the search for suitable property and found a home owned by Mr. Henry Rotham on Laurel Canyon Boulevard, a half block south of Ventura. The purchase was made in July 1941, and the sale finalized a month later, August 8, 1941.

On August 13, 1941, the school was blessed by Archbishop Cantwell. Classes were held Rotham's original home beginning on September 15, 1943. 24 students were enrolled. The school was named Corvallis, a combination of two Latin words: cor(da): heart and vallis: valley. The faculty included: Sister Eleanor (Aquinas) Brown (b. Feb. 16, 1908; d. Oct. 23, 2003) a native of Lane, Idaho and member of the RSHM for 73 years was the founding principal of Corvallis High School; Mother de Sales Connor; Mother Philip Hickey, Mother Gregory Naddy, and Sister Bernadette Murphy was the housekeeper. The first school dance was held on November 8, 1941. The first volleyball game was played against St. Agnes High School. During the World War II, the students sold war bonds and stamps for the war effort and were awarded the "Minute Man Flag".

The school was accredited by the state of California in Spring, 1943. Mother Aidan Keating joined the faculty. The first class graduated in June, 1943. When enrollment increased to 140 students during 1945–1946, a new school building was constructed and finished by May 23, 1947. The Sisters of the RSHM, who had been commuting form Marymount High School in Westwood, moved into the old school building, the original house. At that time the faculty included: Reverend Mother Cecilia Rafter, Superior Mother Aidan Keating, Mother Bernard Thornton, Mother Philip Hickey, Mother Gabriel McCauley, and Mother Johanna Renehan. The auditorium with chapel was constructed in 1962.

In 1980 talks were held with the Brothers of the Holy Cross (Notre Dame High School) about establishing a single co-educational secondary school; no agreement was reached. In 1981, for various internal reasons, the RSHM, which owned the property, transferred operations of the school to the lay administration and parents, under the new name, Our Lady of Corvallis. The newly renamed school continued for six more years, eventually closing its doors in June 1987. Many Corvallis students in the late 1980s transferred to Notre Dame, Grant or Van Nuys High Schools (the latter two high schools are public high schools).

== Other notes ==
Sister Mary Thorton (1913, County Mayo, Ireland – October 25, 2004) served as a high school teacher and principal at Our Lady of Corvallis High School (1945–1992). Sister Donald was principal (1974).

Student Clubs (1974): Student Council, CAA, PEP, Paper Prism, Corvallite (newspaper), Keyettes, A.V., C.S.F, National Honor, Glee Club, Mini-Mester, Memory Book (Yearbook)

Sports (1974): Volleyball, Basketball, Swimming

== Notable alumnae ==
- Catherine Bell, actress
- Camera Bartolotta Pennsylvania state senator
- Geraldine Decker, opera singer
- Sr. Dolores Hart Actress and Benedictine nun
- Sr. Mary Milligan, RSHM, 10th General Superior of the RSHM and the first born in the U.S.

== See also ==
- Religious of the Sacred Heart of Mary
- Roman Catholic Archdiocese of Los Angeles
