= Geraldine Decker =

American opera singer

Geraldine Decker (March 11, 1931, New York City — June 14, 2013, Oxnard, California) was an American mezzo-soprano and voice teacher who had active singing career in operas and concerts from 1971 through 2010. She was particularly active with the Metropolitan Opera and the Seattle Opera, and is best remembered for her annual performances in Seattle of Richard Wagner's Ring Cycle from 1974 to 1987. She taught on the voice faculty of Pepperdine University.

== Early life and education ==
Born Geraldine Helen Rice in the Bronx, Decker moved with her family to California in her youth. She attended Corvallis High School in Studio City, California from 1945 to 1949. She soon after married her husband of 55 years, Howard Decker, with whom she had two sons, Wayne and Dirk Decker. While raising her children she pursued studies in voice with Dr. Nandor Domokos in Los Angeles. She later studied with Luisa Franceschi and her husband, baritone Ellae Verna, in New York City.

== Later life and career ==
After her sons were grown and had moved out of the family home, Decker began pursuing a career in opera at the age of 40. She devoted the next two decades of her life to her opera career. She first drew critical notice in 1974 at the Seattle Opera where she appeared in Richard Wagner's Ring Cycle as Erda in both Das Rheingold and Siegfried, Schwertleite in Die Walküre, and the First Norn Götterdämmerung. She portrayed those roles again in Seattle every summer through 1987. She portrayed many other roles at the Seattle Opera during her career, including Albine in Massenet's Thaïs, Azucena in Verdi's Il trovatore, Filippyevna in Tchaikovsky's Eugene Onegin, Grandmother Burja in Janáček's Jenůfa, Herodias in Strauss' Salome, Klytämnestra in Strauss' Elektra, Mama McCourt in Moore's The Ballad of Baby Doe, Marthe Schwerlein in Gounod's Faust, Mistress Quickly in Verdi's Falstaff, Mother Jeanne in Poulenc's Dialogues of the Carmelites, and the Nurse/Innkeeper in Mussorgsky's Boris Godunov.

Decker made her debut at the Lyric Opera of Chicago in 1978 as Mamma Lucia in Mascagni's Cavalleria rusticana. On December 17, 1980 she sang the same role for her debut at the Metropolitan Opera with Grace Bumbry as Santuzza and David Stivender conducting. She was a regular presence on the Met stage for six seasons, portraying such roles as Gertrud in Humperdinck's Hansel and Gretel, Gertrude in Gounod's Roméo et Juliette (with Placido Domingo conducting), Grandmother Burja in Jenůfa, and Schwertleite in Die Walküre among others. In 1981 she portrayed the Large Woman in the Met premiere of Les Mamelles de Tirésias, and was also seen that year as Annina in the premiere of the Colin Graham staging of Verdi's La traviata; a production which was broadcast nationally on Live from the Met. Her last performance at the Met was as the Nurse in Boris Godunov on March 23, 1987 with Paul Plishka in the title role and James Conlon conducting.

In 1982 Decker created the role of Nelly Dean in the world premiere of Bernard Herrmann's Wuthering Heights at the Portland Opera. That same year she appeared in a minor singing part in Franco Zeffirelli's film version of La Traviata. Other companies she performed roles with during her career included Cabrillo Music Theatre, Hawaii Opera Theater, the Long Beach Opera, the Los Angeles Civic Light Opera, and Opera San José. In 1990 she portrayed Mrs. Beemer in the Disney film Polly: Comin' Home! . She also appeared as a maid in the 1976 film Harry and Walter Go to New York.

Decker lived in Oxnard, California for over 50 years. She died there in 2013 at the age 82 from complications of diabetes.
