= Martha M. Vertreace-Doody =

American poet (born 1945)

Martha Modena Vertreace-Doody (born November 24, 1945 - November 12, 2022) was an American poet, and author of short stories and articles on literature and teaching. She was Distinguished Professor of English and Poet-in-Residence at Kennedy-King College in Chicago.

== Career ==
Vertreace-Doody's work focused on American experiences, as a black woman in the Chicago region, as a participant in American history, and as a community activist. She was involved in Chicago's Catholic and African-American communities, serving as a time as an editor of Community Magazine at Friendship House in Chicago, and publishing poetry in the National Catholic Reporter. In other editorial work, she served as a member of the board of trustees of Illinois Writers Review and as a member of the advisory board of City Magazine. She also served as a judge for grant provided by the Illinois Arts Council and the Wisconsin Arts Board. She was twice a Fellow at the Hawthornden International Writers' Retreat in Scotland.

Her literary career aligned with a growing movement emerging after the 1950s of academic institutions in Chicago to foster poets. Vertreace-Doody was the featured Illinois poet in the winter 1988 issue of Spoon River Quarterly. She was a featured poet in Maverick Magazine in 1999. Her poems have appeared in anthologies including Illinois Voices: An Anthology of Twentieth-Century Poetry (University of Illinois Press), Poets of the New Century (David R. Godine Publisher), and Manthology: Poems on the Male Experience (University of Iowa Press) and The Incredible Sestina Anthology (Write Bloody Publishing).

Her 2014 work, In This Glad Hour, was based on a study of diaries and letters from 1824 to 1848, to create a collection of poems that chronicles and gives voice to the life of Elizabeth Duncan, the wife of Joseph Duncan, the sixth governor of Illinois.

== Personal life ==
Vertreace-Doody was born in Washington, D.C. She earned degrees in English from District of Columbia's Teachers College (BA in 1967) and Roosevelt University (MA, 1972), an MS in Religious Studies from Mundelein College in 1982, and an MFA from Vermont College (1996). She was married to Timothy John Doody. Vertreace-Doody died in November 2022.

== Awards ==
- In 1993, she received the Significant Illinois Poet Award, presented by Gwendolyn Brooks.
- Her 1995 collection, Light Caught Bending, published won a Scottish Arts Council Grant, the first time the award was given to a writer who is not British.
- She has been the winner of four Illinois Arts Council awards (in 1987 for the poem "Trade Secret", in 1989 for the poem "My Uncle Speaks of Bees")
- In 1993, she won a National Endowment for the Arts Fellowship in Creative Writing.
- Her 2004 book Glacier Fire won the Word Press Poetry Prize
- In 2005, she received the Kathy Osterman Award as Outstanding Educational Employee by Mayor Richard M. Daley.

== Selected works ==
=== Collections of poems ===
- 1986. Second House from the Corner. Kennedy-King College Press.
- 1991. Under a Cat’s-Eye Moon. Clockwatch Review Press.
- 1994. Oracle Bones. White Eagle Press.
- 1995. Cinnabar. Flume Press.
- 1995. Light Caught Bending. Diehard Publishers.
- 1996. Maafa: When Night Becomes a Lion. Ion Books.
- 1998. Smokeless Flame. Frith Press.
- 1999. Dragon Lady, Tsukimi. Riverstone Press.
- 2004. Glacier Fire. Word Press.
- 2014. In This Glad Hour. Purple Flag

=== Stories for children ===
- 1993. Martha M. Vertreace and Sandra Speidel. Kelly in the Mirror.

=== Essays ===
- 1989. Martha M. Vertreace. "Secrets left to tell: creativity and continuity in the mother-daughter dyad". Mother Puzzles: Daughters and Mothers in Contemporary American Literature, Mickey Pearlman (ed). New York: Greenwood Press.
- 1989. Martha M. Vertreace. "Toni Cade Bambara: The Dance of Character and Community", American Women Writing Fiction: Memory, Identity, Family, Space, Mickey Pearlman (ed). University of Kentucky Press.
- 1993. Martha M. Vertreace. "StreetWise Writers: Use of StreetWise in Creative Writing Classes", ERIC.
- 2003. Martha Modena Vertreace-Doody. "In Hyde Park: Momentary Stay Against Confusion", In the Middle of the Middle West: Literary Nonfiction from the Heartland, Becky Bradway (ed). Indiana University Press.
