= Catherine Dunn (school administrator) =

American academic administrator

Sister Catherine Dunn, BVM, is a former President of Clarke College in Dubuque, Iowa. She was named the 14th President of the school on January 27, 1984. She retired on June 30, 2006.

Dunn earned her undergraduate and graduate degrees from Arizona State University. She then joined Clarke College as a member of the education faculty. She would remain in that post until 1979, when she became the school's Vice President of Institutional Advancement. Clarke College named Dunn the school's 14th President on January 27, 1984.

One of the first major challenges that Dunn faced came on May 17, 1984, when a fire destroyed four of the historic buildings on campus. Dunn oversaw the reconstruction of the buildings, which was completed in 1986. The Council for the Advancement and Support of Education gave her its silver award in 1985, and its bronze award in 1986 for her leadership during and following the fire.

Dunn has served on the National Association of Independent Colleges and Universities, the Council of Independent Colleges (CIC), the Council for the Advancement and Support of Education, the Iowa College Foundation (ICF), and the Iowa Association of Independent Colleges and Universities (IAICU). In 1989 Dunn was also named to the Iowa Transportation Commission, and in 1994 was named the first female chair of the commission. Dunn also served on the boards of the Junior Achievement of the Tri-States, the Dubuque Area Chamber of Commerce, American Trust and Savings Bank, and the Tri-State Community Health Center.

Dunn has also received numerous honors and awards during her career. The Telegraph Herald gave her its "First Citizen" award in 1986. The Dubuque Chamber of Commerece awarded her the Distinguished Civic Service Award in 1993. She received the Dubuque Jaycee's 1996 Gilbert Chavanelle Award. In 2000 the Des Moines Register named her as one of the 50 most influential Iowans. Dunn holds honorary degrees from Loras College, Mount St. Clare College (today Ashford University), the University of Dubuque, and St. Ambrose University.

Early in 2006 Dunn announced that she was planning to step down from her post. Joanne Burrows, SC (Sisters of Charity) PhD succeeded her as president on July 1, 2006.
