= Luke Flynn =

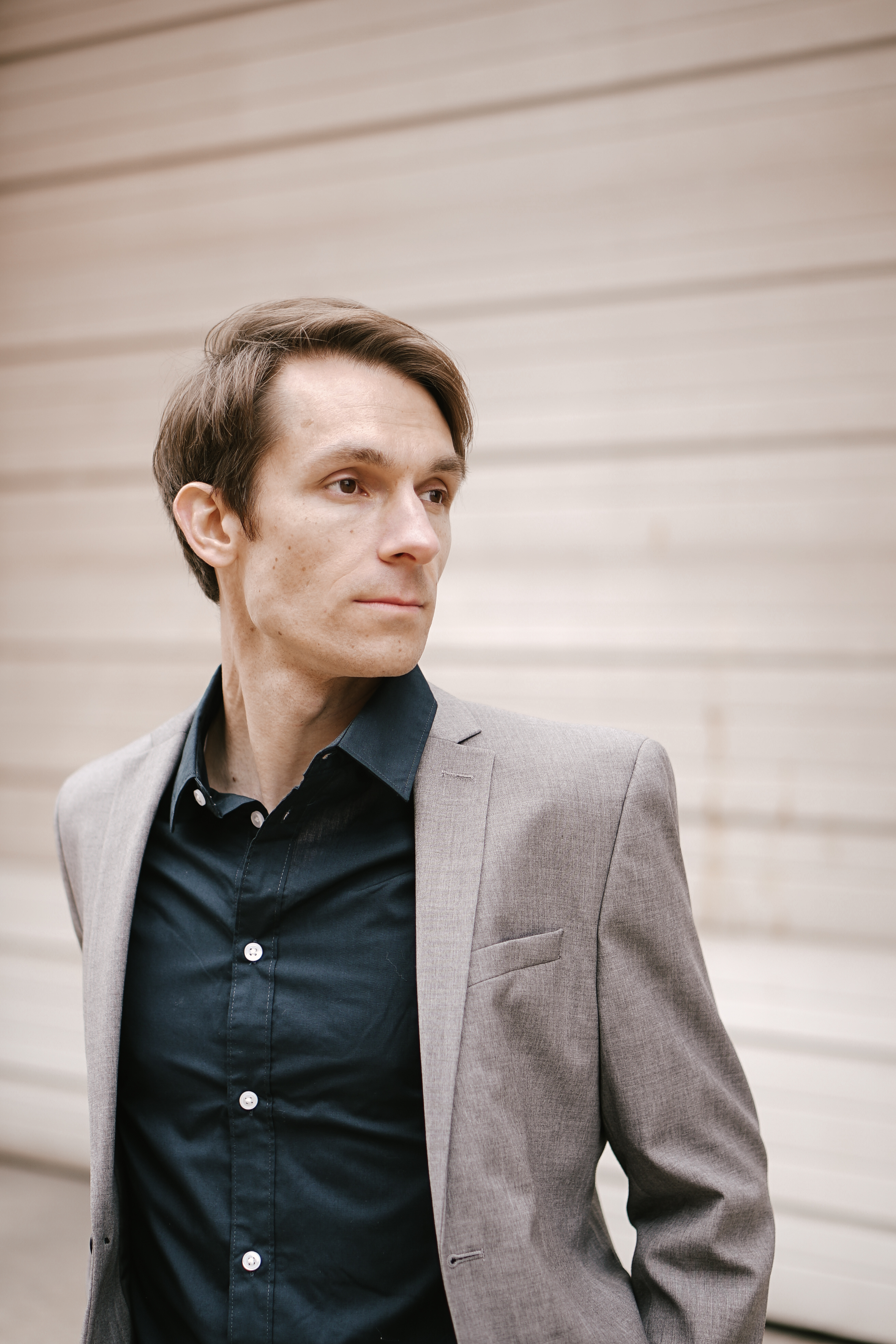

Background information
- Born: March 17, 1988 (age 38); Dubuque, Iowa, United States
- Genres: Film score; Classical
- Occupation: Composer
- Website: Official website

Luke Flynn (born 1988, in Dubuque, Iowa) is an American composer of film, television, and concert music. He is most widely known for his choral, orchestral, and concert band works.

In the film industry, he has composed the scores for several movies, including Holmes and Watson (2018); his film music credits include numerous other titles, such as Frozen II, Star Wars: The Rise of Skywalker, La La Land, and many others.

== Education ==
Flynn graduated summa cum laude from Butler University with a masters of music composition, where he studied with Michael Schelle, and was a graduate assistant in music composition, and a teaching assistant in music technologies. He graduated summa cum laude from Clarke University, with a Bachelor of Arts in music composition, where he studied with Amy Dunker, and was the recipient of the Francis J. O’ Connor Memorial Award, Clarke University's most prestigious award given to a single graduating senior. Flynn also studied music composition at 鹿児島国際大学, the International University of Kagoshima in Japan, with Japanese composer Tadashi Kubo.

== Composition awards and accolades ==
(Winner, runner-up, or finalist)

- Winds Composition Contest Saxony (2023)
- American Prize in Composition (2023)
- Sandra Fivecoat Memorial Emerging Composer Contest (2020)
- Illinois State University Red Note New Music Festival Composition Competition – Orchestra (2019)
- Ithaca Choral Composition Contest (2018)
- Reno Pops Orchestra Composition Contest (2018)
- MidCities Chamber Singers Choral Composition Competition (2018)
- Eastern Michigan University National Choral Composition Competition (2018)
- CSUN Orchestra Northridge Composition Prize (2018)
- Chorus Austin Young Composers Competition (2017)
- Ball State University Festival of New Music Call for Works (2017)
- Sydney Australia Contemporary Orchestra Call for Scores (2015)
- Oklahoma Composers' Orchestra Inaugural Composition Contest (2015)
- South Korean Busan Maru International Composition Contest (orchestra ) 부산마루국제음악제 (2015)
- Minnesota Orchestra Composer Institute (2015)
- Ablaze Records Orchestral Masters composition contest (2015)
- Lexington Philharmonic New Music Experiment (2015)
- Young New Yorkers' Chorus Composition Competition (2014)
- 12 Minutes of Fame Across the Universe Call for Scores (2014)
- The Indie Gathering “Best Original Film Score” Award (2014)
- SCI/ASCAP Student Composition Competition (2013)
- Imagine Music Pathways Composition Contest (2012)
- American Prize in Composition (2013)
- San Jose Choral Project Composition Competition (2012)
- The Foundation for Sacred Music Composers International Composition Contest (2012)
- New York International Composition Contest for Sacred Music (2011)
- American College Theater Festival Best Original Score (2010)

== List of compositions ==
=== Orchestral and large ensemble ===
- Unease, Concert Band (2020)
- Rift, Symphony Orchestra (2015)
- It Was Then I Awoke, SSAA + String Orchestra + Perc. Ensemble (2014)
- Pervenire, String Orchestra (2015)
- Cloud Memories, Symphonic Band (2014)
- Messier 82, Symphony Orchestra (2013)
- Quiet Snow, Symphony Orchestra (2009)
- Pioneer, Symphony Orchestra (2013) – Theme music commission for the Julien International Film Festival
- Sancta Caecilia, Symphonic Band + SATB (2010)
- Night Flight of the Specter, String Orchestra (2010)
- The Crusader Roar (University Fight Song), Wind Band + SATB (2011)
- Eyes Like Aster, Wind Band (2009)

=== Choral and Vocal ===
- Moonlit Apples, SATB + Piano (2025)
- Natsu Kusa (Summer Grass), SATB + Cello + Piano (2024)
- Winter Lullaby (Little Dear-My-Soul), SATB + Piano (2023)
- Amidst the Storm, SATB, Strings, Percussion (2023)
- Agnus Dei, SATB (2020)
- Beneath the Wave, SATB (2011)
- White Moon, SATB (2017) – Commissioned by Choral Arts Initiative
- The Hushed House, SATB (2014) – Commissioned by Young New Yorkers' Chorus
- Ave Maria, SATB (2013)
- Windowsill Rain, Soprano + Piano (2011) Commission, 2011 by the Korea & Japan Annual International Exchange Art Songs Festival
- Until Autumn..., SS+ Piano (2015) Commission, 2015 by the International Haiku Association, Japan

=== Chamber and small ensemble ===
- Destiny March, Fl., Vln., Org. (2013)
- Snakebite, Bb Cl., Vln., Pno. (2013)
- Cleveland Park, Bb Tpt., Pno. (2011)
- Refè, Vln., Vla. I, Vla. II., Vc., Bsn. (2013)
- Frostbite, Bb Cl., Pno. (2013)
- Free Flight, Fl., Pno. (2012)
- Blue Bird, Fly Away, Vln., Vc. (2012)
- Dance in the Summer Field, Brass Quintet (2010)
- As the River, Vc., Perc. (2011)
- Starlight Fanfare, Chamber Brass (2010)
- The Gamecock, Woodwind Quintet (2011)
- Credo, Bb Tpt., Pno. (2009)

=== Solo ===
- Tabi 旅, Japanese Koto (2011)
- Year of the Dragon, Piano (2012)
  1. Hatch
  2. Flight
  3. Flame
- Adding Flowers, Piano (2010)
- Lost, Percussion Solo (2011)
  1. Mesozoic Merengue (Marimba Solo)
  2. The Breaking of the Conch: The Savage Hunt (Timpani Solo)
  3. Fireworks Show (Snare Drum Solo)
- Marie, Piano (2009)

== Filmography ==
=== Movies ===
- Toy Story 5, 2026 (music preparation)
- Hoppers (film), 2026 (music preparation)
- Disclosure Day, 2026 (music preparation)
- The Devil Wears Prada 2, 2026 (music preparation)
- Diary of a Wimpy Kid: The Last Straw (film), 2025 (music preparation)
- Lilo & Stitch (2025 film), 2025 (music preparation)
- Avatar: Fire and Ash, 2025 (music preparation)
- The SpongeBob Movie: Search for SquarePants, 2025 (music preparation)
- A Minecraft Movie, 2025 (music preparation)
- Oh. What. Fun., 2025 (music preparation)
- Ghostbusters: Frozen Empire, 2024 (music preparation)
- Harold and the Purple Crayon (film), 2024 (music preparation)
- Unfrosted, 2024 (music preparation)
- Indiana Jones and the Dial of Destiny, 2023 (music preparation)
- Killers of the Flower Moon (film), 2023 (music preparation)
- White Men Can't Jump (2023 film), 2023 (music preparation)
- Maestro (2023 film), 2023 (music preparation)
- Vacation Friends 2, 2023 (music preparation)
- Peter Pan & Wendy, 2023 (music preparation)
- Under the Boardwalk (2023 film), 2023 (music preparation)
- Renfield (film), 2023 (music preparation)
- Candy Cane Lane (film), 2023 (music preparation)
- Shazam! Fury of the Gods, 2023 (music preparation)
- 65 (film), 2023 (music preparation)
- The Fabelmans, 2022 (music preparation)
- Babylon (2022 film), 2022 (music preparation)
- Avatar: The Way of Water, 2022 (music preparation)
- Marry Me (2022 film), 2022 (music preparation)
- Hocus Pocus 2, 2022 (music preparation)
- Where the Crawdads Sing (film), 2022 (music preparation)
- The Fabelmans, 2022 (music preparation)
- The Bob's Burgers Movie, 2022 (music preparation)
- Turning Red, 2022 (music preparation)
- Raya and the Last Dragon, 2021 (music preparation)
- Luca (2021 film), 2021 (music preparation)
- A Journal for Jordan, 2021 (music preparation)
- The Addams Family 2, 2021 (music preparation)
- Dear Evan Hansen (film), 2021 (music preparation)
- Venom: Let There Be Carnage, 2021 (music preparation)
- Snake Eyes (2021 film), 2021 (music preparation)
- Clifford the Big Red Dog (film), 2021 (music preparation)
- Ghostbusters: Afterlife, 2021 (music preparation)
- Tenet, 2020 (music preparation)
- A Quiet Place II, 2020 (music preparation)
- Da 5 Bloods, 2020 (music preparation)
- The Way Back (2020 film), 2020 (music preparation)
- Christmas on the Square, 2020 (music preparation)
- The New Mutants (film), 2020 (music preparation)
- Superintelligence (film), 2020 (music preparation)
- Underwater (film), 2020 (music preparation)
- Jungle Cruise, 2020 (music preparation)
- West Side Story 2021, 2021 (music preparation)
- Onward, 2020 (music preparation)
- The Call of the Wild, 2020 (music preparation)
- Star Wars: The Rise of Skywalker, 2019 (music preparation)
- Frozen II, 2019 (music preparation)
- Wonder Park, 2019 (music preparation)
- Isn't It Romantic (2019 film), 2019 (music preparation)
- Little Women (2019 film), 2019 (music preparation)
- The Addams Family (2019 film), 2019 (music preparation)
- Doctor Sleep, 2019 (music preparation)
- Gemini Man, 2019 (music preparation)
- A Beautiful Day in the Neighborhood, 2019 (music preparation)
- Just Mercy, 2019 (music preparation)
- Marriage Story, 2019 (music preparation)
- Ford v Ferrari, 2019 (music preparation)
- Men in Black: International, 2019 (music preparation)
- Toy Story 4, 2019 (music preparation)
- Breakthrough (2019 film), 2019 (music preparation)
- The Secret Life of Pets 2, 2019 (music preparation)
- The Lego Movie 2: The Second Part, 2019 (music preparation)
- Velvet Buzzsaw, 2019 (music preparation)
- A Dog's Way Home, 2019 (music preparation)
- Holmes & Watson, 2018 (composer – additional music)
- Welcome to Marwen, 2018 (music preparation)
- The Hate U Give (film), 2018 (music preparation)
- Mary Poppins Returns, 2018 (music preparation)
- Fifty Shades Freed (film), 2018 (music preparation)
- Creed II, 2018 (music preparation)
- Maze Runner: The Death Cure, 2018 (music preparation)
- Love, Simon, 2018 (music preparation)
- Night School (2018 film), 2018 (music preparation)
- Overboard (2018 film), 2018 (music preparation)
- The Grinch, 2018 (music preparation)
- Venom, 2018 (music preparation)
- First Man, 2018 (music preparation)
- Christopher Robin, 2018 (music preparation)
- Solo: A Star Wars Story, 2018 (music preparation)
- Avengers: Infinity War, 2018 (music preparation)
- The Christmas Chronicles, 2018 (music preparation)
- Death Wish (2018 film), 2018 (music preparation)
- Ready Player One, 2018 (music preparation)
- A Quiet Place, 2018 (music preparation)
- Fifty Shades Freed, 2018 (music preparation)
- The Post, 2018 (music preparation)
- Star Wars: The Last Jedi, 2018 (music preparation)
- Ferdinand, 2018 (music preparation)
- Trolls Holiday, 2017 (music preparation)
- Cars 3, 2017 (music preparation)
- The Greatest Showman, 2017 (music preparation)
- Snatched (2017 film), 2017 (music preparation)
- Going in Style (2017 film), 2017 (music preparation)
- CHiPs (film), 2017 (music preparation)
- Diary of a Wimpy Kid: The Long Haul (film), 2017 (music preparation)
- Captain Underpants: The First Epic Movie, 2017 (music preparation)
- Logan, 2017 (music preparation)
- Fantastic Beasts and Where to Find Them, 2016 (music preparation)
- Trolls, 2016 (music preparation)
- Storks, 2016 (music preparation)
- La La Land, 2016 (music preparation)
- Sing (2016 American film), 2016 (music preparation)
- How to Be Single, 2016 (music preparation)
- Jason Bourn, 2016 (music preparation)
- Ghostbusters, 2016 (music preparation)
- X-Men: Apocalypse, 2016 (music preparation)
- Ice Age: Collision Course, 2016 (music preparation)
- Keeping Up with the Joneses (film), 2016 (music preparation)
- Office Christmas Party, 2016 (music preparation)
- The Secret Life of Pets, 2016 (music preparation)
- The BFG, 2016 (music preparation)
- The Jungle Book, 2016 (music preparation)
- The Nice Guys, 2016 (music preparation)
- Florence Foster Jenkins, 2016 (music preparation)
- Central Intelligence, 2016 (music preparation)
- Collateral Beauty, 2016 (music preparation)
- The Girl on the Train (2016 film), 2016 (music preparation)
- The Huntsman: Winter's War, 2016 (music preparation)
- Gods of Egypt, 2016 (music preparation)
- Zoolander 2, 2016 (music preparation)
- Monster Trucks, 2016 (music preparation)
- The Finest Hours, 2016 (music preparation)
- Star Wars: The Force Awakens, 2015 (music preparation)
- Alvin and the Chipmunks: The Road Chip, 2015 (music preparation)
- The Good Dinosaur, 2015 (music preparation)
- The Hunger Games: Mockingjay - Part 2, 2015 (music preparation)
- Ant-Man, 2015 (music preparation)
- Creed, 2015 (music preparation)
- Concussion, 2015 (music preparation)
- The Peanuts Movie, 2015 (music preparation)
- Maze Runner: The Scorch Trials, 2015 (music preparation)
- Fantastic Four, 2015 (music preparation)

=== Television ===
- Ahsoka (TV series) (music preparation)
- Stargirl (TV series) (music preparation)
- Only Murders in the Building (music preparation)
- The Book of Boba Fett (music preparation)
- The Mandalorian (music preparation)
- Halo (TV series) (music preparation)
- Murderbot (TV series) (music preparation)
- Elsbeth (TV series) (music preparation)
- The Simpsons (orchestrator; music preparation)
- Family Guy (music preparation)
- Willow (TV series) (music preparation)
- The Orville (music preparation)
- American Dad! (music preparation)
- Crazy Ex-Girlfriend (music preparation)
- Empire (music preparation)
- Bates Motel (music preparation)
- When We Rise (music preparation)
- Son of Zorn (music preparation)
