= Sisters of Charity of the Blessed Virgin Mary =

Religious institute

- Abbreviation: BVM
- Formation: November 1, 1833
- Type: religious institute
- Purpose: Form Religious Schools
- Headquarters: Mount Carmel, Dubuque, Iowa
- Location: United States, Ecuador, Guatemala, Ghana
- Website: bvmsisters.org

The Sisters of Charity of the Blessed Virgin Mary, known by its initials BVM, is a Catholic religious institute founded in the United States by Mother Mary Frances Clarke. The BVM currently works in twenty-five U.S. states and three other countries.

== Early history ==
In 1831, four Franciscan Tertiaries women in Dublin rented a small cottage and began an experiment in community living. Soon, the original four - Mary Frances Clarke, Margaret Mann, Rose O’Toole, and Eliza Kelly - were joined by another, Catherine Byrne.

Together, in March 1832, these five opened a school, Miss Clarke’s Seminary, for young girls on North Anne Street in Dublin. In 1833, they met Patrick Costello, a Catholic priest from Philadelphia. From him the five learned about the plight of the Irish Catholic immigrants in America. After prayerful consideration and Fr. Costello's agreement to make arrangements for their arrival in the US, the fellowship of women, except for O'Toole (who remained in Dublin long enough to settle a family estate) decided to leave their homeland to teach in Philadelphia. They arrived in New York in September 1833.

During the voyage, the women had entrusted their money to Kelly. As she was climbing down a rope ladder to depart the ship, the purse containing the money accidentally fell into the harbor. In a further setback, the women discovered that Fr. Costello had not prepared for their arrival, and was nowhere to be found. When they finally arrived in Philadelphia, they were taken in by Margaret McDonough, who found them lodging, and directed them to a young priest.

Ms McDonough directed the group to Fr. Terence James Donaghoe, who had just been named pastor of the yet-to-be-built parish of St. Michael’s. After meeting the women, Fr. Donaghoe invited them to teach in his parish school, as soon as it was completed. In the interim, the women decided to open a school of their own, which they named Sacred Heart.

The Sisters of Charity of the Blessed Virgin Mary was officially founded on November 1, 1833. The group made an act of consecration as the Sisters of the Blessed Virgin. In this act, the band of women took one more step in becoming a formal community of women religious sisters within the Roman Catholic tradition. Fr. Donaghoe drafted a rule for the small community and subsequently became father director, while Clarke was named mother superior. For the next ten years, the sisters continued to teach as well as gain new members.

== Iowa Territory ==
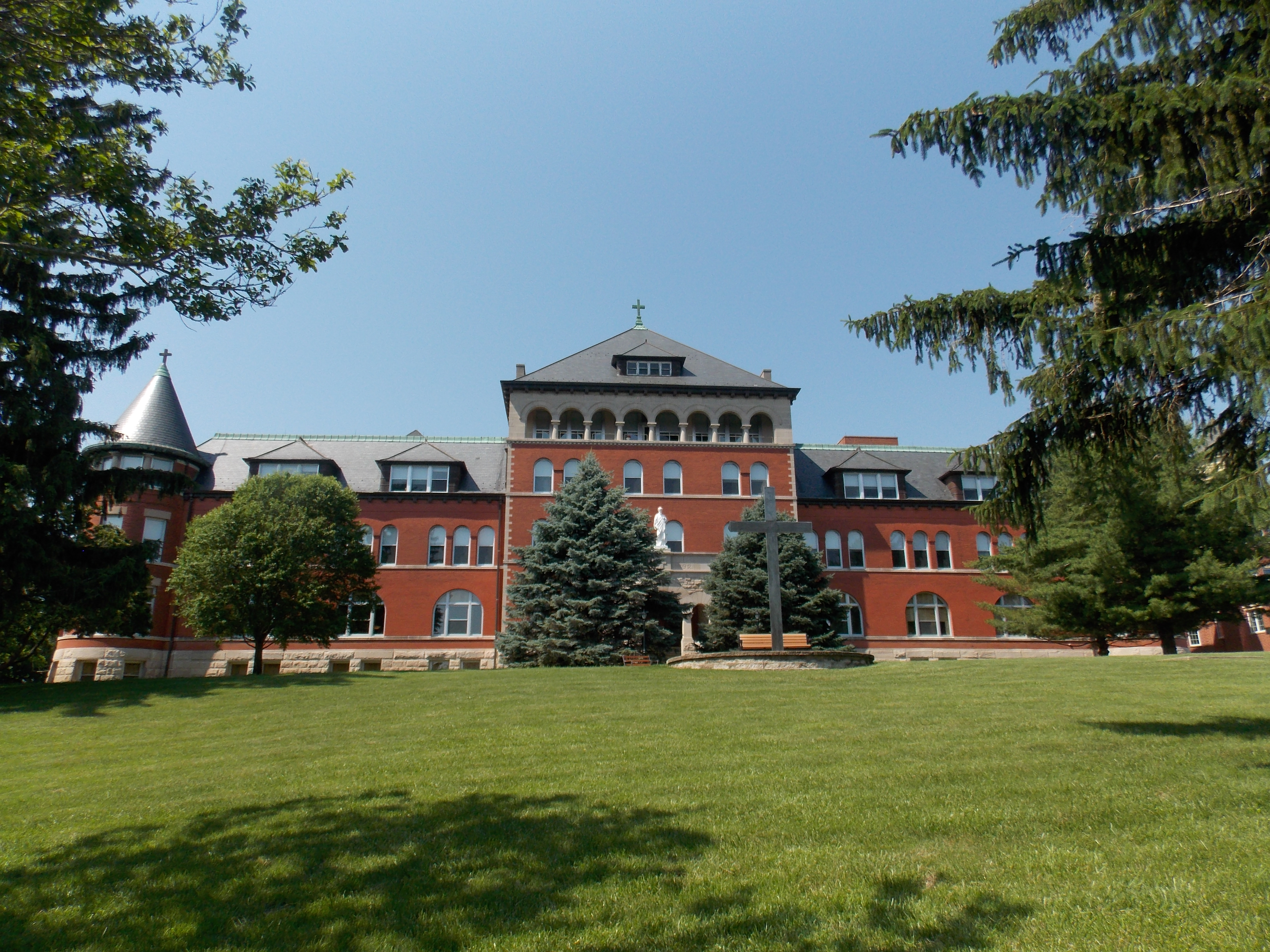
Mount Carmel, the Motherhouse complex, in Dubuque

In 1843, Bishop Mathias Loras of the Diocese of Dubuque, Iowa, who had been visiting Philadelphia, invited the sisters to come teach in the Iowa Territory. The pioneer BVMs, by then nineteen in number, moved to Dubuque, Iowa, and began to teach the children of settlers, lead miners, and farmers. They opened a boarding school, St. Mary’s Academy, which was the predecessor of the St. Raphael Cathedral school. They were the first women religious in the territory and would soon open many additional schools.

During their first years in Iowa, the building was used for another school, Sacred Heart. In 1859, the building again saw new life when the St. Joseph Prairie boarding school moved to the site. In 1867 Jesuit priest Arnold Damen invited the sisters to open a school at Holy Family in Chicago. The BVMs opened a number of schools throughout the city, including St. Mary’s and Immaculata High Schools.

In 1885, the Sisters of Charity of the Blessed Virgin Mary, formerly a diocesan community, became a pontifical congregation.

== Continued growth ==
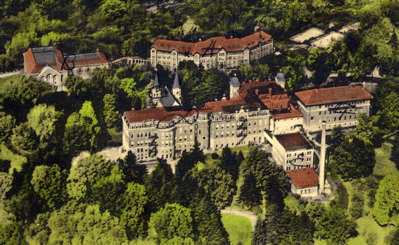
Historic view of Clarke College in Dubuque

Since the beginning, education had been the dominant charism of the BVM community. This continued as the sisterhood grew. Over the next several decades, community leaders directed significant resources on improving the education of the sisters, who were responsible for teaching a large number of students.

During the twentieth century, the BVM community continued to grow in both size and number of missions. In the early 1900s, the superior sent teaching sisters to summer school programs at DePaul, Marquette, and the Catholic University of America, as well as to special institutes run at St. Mary’s, one of the community run high schools in Chicago. This ongoing education was especially important for those sisters who taught at Mt. St. Joseph; in 1901 the school received permission to begin granting three-year college degrees.

To honor Mary Frances Clarke, the name of Mt. St. Joseph College was changed to Clarke College in 1928. The following year, construction began for another college, Mundelein College in Chicago. This school remained open until 1991, when it became part of Loyola University. During this time, the community continued to focus on the education of both the students, and the teaching sisters.

1937 saw the opening of a school in Memphis at which the sisters began working directly with the African American community. A few years later, in 1945 a small group of sisters opened a school in Hawaii, and by 1961 there were sisters serving in Latin America. With sisters serving in so many locations, the community developed into a well-networked educational system that spanned the country, from New York to California, and beyond.

In 1849 there was a fire at St. Joseph Prairie; there was a 1955 fire at the infirmary at the Dubuque motherhouse, a 1958 fire at Our Lady of the Angels (a BVM grammar school in Chicago), and a 1984 fire at Clarke College.

Previously the habit had a distinct cover in the shape of a horseshoe. The habit changed in 1959.

== New era ==
1961 marked the beginning of a new era in the community and the construction of one of the last remaining BVM high schools. Carmel High School in Mundelein, Illinois was a joint project with the Carmelite Fathers.

In 1967, the Tenth General Chapter sought to respond to the invitations of the Second Vatican Council. The BVMs responded to the Council’s call to renewal. Their mission and ministry expanded around the globe and beyond the traditional field of education to include health care, pastoral services, and social justice. Activities which followed included legislation approving a new government structure, the Totally Open Personal Application (TOPA), which gave sisters the freedom to apply for jobs of their choice, and an affiliate program, which consisted of an organized grouping of non-vowed men and women interested in participating in the BVM values. 1968 saw the closing of the last boarding school.

The congregation celebrated its 190th Anniversary on November 1, 2023. At that time, there were more than 200 sisters with an average age of 85 years.

== Social action ==
The community has been actively involved in working for peace with justice. During the Civil Rights Movement, sisters participated in the 1965 Selma to Montgomery marches. A number of sisters participated in the annual demonstration at the School of the Americas/Western Hemisphere Institute for Security Cooperation each year. Sisters of Charity are on the staff of NETWORK and the 8th Day Center for Justice, a coalition of Catholic religious congregations striving for social change. BVM sisters and their associates collaborate with other women religious and advocacy organizations on issues such as immigration reform, human trafficking, opposition to the death penalty, and nonviolence, especially for women and children. The congregation has also taken a corporate stance against the death penalty, has declared that the Mount Carmel campus in Dubuque is a nuclear-free zone, and supports national comprehensive immigration reform.

Currently the congregation has sisters living in nineteen states, and in three foreign countries: Ghana, Ecuador, and Guatemala. Ministries of the sisters include working as chaplains in hospitals, hospices and prisons, working with those with addictions or AIDS, pastoral service, spiritual direction, counseling and education.

== Notable members ==
- Sister Anne Carr - theology professor
- Mother Mary Frances Clarke - founder
- Sister Catherine Dunn - past president of Clarke College
- Blanche Marie Gallagher, artist (painter)
- Mary Kenneth Keller - first person to receive a Ph.D. in computer science
- Judith Ann Mayotte - former member, author, refugee expert
- Sister Jean Dolores Schmidt - chaplain of the Loyola University Chicago men's basketball team; became a media celebrity during the team's 2018 Final Four run.

== Sources ==
- Harrington, Ann BVM. Creating Community: Mary Frances Clarke and Her Companions. Dubuque, Iowa: Mount Carmel Press, 2004.
- McDonnell, Mary Jane BVM, et al. Clarke Lives. Dubuque, Iowa: Clarke College, 1993.
- Sisters of Charity BVM. Salt: Charting BVM History, 1984.
- Sisters of Charity BVM. Constitutions. Dubuque, Iowa: Mount Carmel Press, 1989.
