= Bridges Academy =

Location
- 3921 Laurel Canyon Blvd; Studio City, California; United States; 34.141082°N 118.395316°W

Information
- Type: Independent
- Motto: Imagine, Persevere, Achieve; Educating the Exceptional²
- Religious affiliation: nonsectarian
- Established: 1994
- Founder: Carolyn McWilliams
- Principal: Michael Dennis (Phoenix Program and Middle School); Debbie Lazer, Ed.D (High School)
- Head of school: Mark Long
- Faculty: 70
- Grades: 3-12
- Enrollment: 180+
- Campus size: 3+ acres
- Colors: Light and Dark Blue/Yellow
- Athletics: Cross country, track, Basketball, Golf
- Mascot: Phoenix
- Nickname: Bridges
- Accreditation: WASC, NAIS, CAIS

Bridges Academy, Los Angeles, is a college prep school (Grades 4–12) serving twice-exceptional (or "2e") learners—students who are gifted but who also have learning differences such as, but not exclusively, mild ASD, AD/HD, executive functioning challenges, processing deficits, and mild dyslexia. The students are driven by creativity and intellectual curiosity. The Bridges educational model is strength-based and talent-development driven. Each student has an individual learning plan created to meet their diverse learning style, academic, creative, and social/emotional needs. Stimulating core classes, abundant enrichment, small class size, extensive academic supports, and a vital advisory and mentoring program are all part of the Bridges approach. The school is located in Studio City, Los Angeles, California.

== History ==
Bridges Academy started as a private tutorial for three students in the home of founder Carolyn McWilliams in 1994. Prior to the 1997–1998 school year, the school relocated to its former site on Burbank Boulevard in Sherman Oaks, California. During that time, annual enrollment was between 40 and 50 students per year.

In 1998, the school was granted non-profit corporation status, with a board of trustees and McWilliams continuing as the Head of School. In 2001, the board of trustees and Head of School dedicated the mission of the school to educating twice-exceptional students. McWilliams retired in the summer of 2003, and Charles "Chuck" Potts, the founding Head of the Wesley School in North Hollywood, California, was hired as interim Head of School. After a national search, Carl Sabatino, former Head of the Upper School of Lawrence Woodmere Academy in N.Y., was hired as Head of School in 2005 and retired in 2023. In 2008, enrollment had reached over 100 students; as of 2010, it had risen to over 150 students. Current enrollment is around 180.

== Facilities ==
In 2005, Bridges moved from its previous location in Sherman Oaks, California to its current location in a shared-use arrangement with Osaka Sangyo University (OSULA) Education Center. The campus is the former site of the all-girls Catholic Corvallis High School (California). It was purchased by OSULA in the late 1980s. Bridges continued absorbing more and more classroom and administrative space until finally purchasing the campus in 2011, at which time OSULA moved on to another location.

== Curriculum ==
The curriculum is strength-based and student-centered, driven by an understanding that "students thrive when the academic challenge is commensurate with their intellectual gifts", and a belief that "students' special needs can be met without diluting the curriculum." Gifts, passions, talents, and interests are cultivated through stimulating core academic classes, a rich array of electives and enrichment clusters, project-driven Intersessions and a Young Experts Achievement program. The learning disabilities among the gifted and very gifted student population include: Autism, nonverbal learning differences, organizational challenges, Attention-Deficit Hyperactivity Disorder, audio and visual processing problems, dysgraphia, and anxiety.

The program is accredited by the Western Association of Schools & Colleges (WASC) and the California Association of Independent Schools (CAIS). Bridges is a Member of the California Association of Independent Schools; the National Association of Independent Schools; and the Educational Records Bureau. The high school program meets or exceeds the University of California A-G requirements for high school graduation.

All students are required to have a laptop. The campus has a wireless network aside from hardwired classrooms and offices.

In sports, Bridges participates in the California Interscholastic Federation (CIF) in basketball, cross country, track, and golf. Other sports and physical activities are part of the traditional fitness component of the curriculum.

In 2014, interest from multiple students led to the creation of a Speech and Debate Program where students compete in a range of different public speaking and debate events across a statewide and national level. As of 2016, the Bridges team is an active member school of the National Speech and Debate Association, and has qualified students to the CHSSA State Speech and Debate Championship Tournament and the NSDA's National Speech and Debate Tournament Finals in only two years of existence.

Since first graduation in 1996, graduates have been accepted at virtually all community colleges Valley College, Cal State and University of California schools, as well as some major universities and four-year colleges throughout the nation.

In 2007, two Bridges students received Honorable Mention Awards as part of the Smart Kids With Learning Disabilities organization's annual Youth Achievement Award program.

Parents' involvement is encouraged and supported via the Parents Association, online resources and forums, and on-campus events including support groups and a speaker series.

== Mascot ==
In 2010, Academy Students voted on a new mascot. They chose the Phoenix out of many submitted designs. The mascot is used for athletic and fundraising purposes. All documentation and branding contain the official logo of the school, a bridge.

== Organization ==
Bridges Academy is part of Bridges Education Group. Schools in the group include Bridges Academy Los Angeles (grades 4-12), Bridges Academy Online, Bridges Graduate School for Cognitive Diversity, Bridges 2e Center for Research and Professional Development, Bridges 2e Media, and 2eNews.com
