= Mary Frances Clarke =

Irish nun

Mary Frances Clarke BVM
- Born: Dublin, Ireland
- Baptised: 15 December 1802
- Died: 4 December 1887 (aged 84); Dubuque, Iowa, United States
- Occupations: Educator, sister of charity
- Years active: 1828–1887
- Known for: Founding the Sisters of Charity of the Blessed Virgin Mary and Clarke University

Mary Frances Clarke, B.V.M. (c. 15 December 1802 – 4 December 1887) was an Irish nun who founded the Catholic order of the Sisters of Charity of the Blessed Virgin Mary.

Initially started in Philadelphia, Pennsylvania, to provide educational opportunities for immigrants' children, the order relocated in the 1840s to Dubuque, Iowa, and established prairie schools across the high plains. One of those initial schools later became Clarke University. She was posthumously inducted into the Iowa Women's Hall of Fame.

== Biography ==
Mary Frances Clarke was baptized on 15 December 1802 (Note: Though her date of birth is sometimes recorded 2 March 1803, 2 March 1806 or 15 December 1802, the website of the Sisters of Charity of the Blessed Virgin Mary states that during a visit in April 2002 to Dublin, Ann M. Harrington and Mary Alma Sullivan, two members of their order, located baptismal records at the St. Andrew's Chapel on Townsend Street, showing Clarke was baptized on 15 December 1802.) at the St. Andrew's Chapel on Townsend Street in Dublin, Ireland. Her parents were Mary Anne (née Quartermaster) (Note: Her mother's name is sometimes alternatively listed as Elizabeth or Catherine Quartermaster.) and Cornelius Clarke. Attending a penny school, which was the weekly price paid for basic elementary education in a national rather than a charity or church school, Clarke learned botany, music, needlework and to read and write. She later acted as a secretary and bookkeeper for her father's leather business. When the plague broke out in Dublin, Clarke and several friends moved into a slum area on North Anne Street in Dublin and began a girls' school. In 1831, she and three other women who had joined the Third Order of St. Francis, decided to live together and the following year, they opened a school, which they named Miss Clarke's Seminary. Before the school even fully got off the ground, the women heard of a need for teachers in the United States from a missionary priest who had observed their school on Anne Street. The five women, Clarke, Catherine Byrne, Eliza Kelly, Margaret Mann, and Rose O'Toole decided to emigrate to Philadelphia to teach the children of Irish immigrants.

In July 1833, the women traveled from Dublin to New York City and then on to Philadelphia, Pennsylvania. Because of an accident, they lost their money and had to depend on a stranger to help with their passage and Father Terence Donaghoe, to help them rent space once they arrived in Pennsylvania. The women took up piecework at a garment factory to pay their bills and allow them to establish the school. On 1 November 1833, Clarke founded the Sisters of Charity of the Blessed Virgin Mary with her countrywomen. They remained in Philadelphia for the next 10 years, founded two private schools, and the order grew to 19 women. In 1843, a visiting Bishop, Mathias Loras, who was on his way to Baltimore asked the sisters to come and help him establish schools in Dubuque, Iowa, for Native Americans. In June, 1843, five sisters—Patrice Caniff, Elizabeth Kelly, Margaret Mann, Francis O'Reilly, and Joseph O'Reilly—accompanied by Bishop Loras and the newly appointed bishop of St. Louis, Peter Richard Kenrick, left by train heading west. At the end of the month, traveling by canal and rail, they arrived in Iowa, "becoming the first religious congregation in the Iowa Territory". Though teaching among the native tribes never materialized, the women had established a school for settlers' children, called St. Mary's Academy by the beginning of July. By September 1843, the rest of the sisters headed west, bringing their piano and arrived in October. A few months later, in May, 1844, Know Nothing rioters destroyed the school and convent in Philadelphia, causing Father Donaghoe to leave Philadelphia and join the sisters.

The St. Joseph's Prairie Home site was selected in 1845 about eight miles southwest of Dubuque and the school was completed in 1846. It remained on the prairie until 1859, when needing more room for novices, the sisters relocated the school to Dubuque. The sisters established schools throughout Iowa and Wisconsin and by 1867 ventured into Chicago. Father Donaghoe died in 1869 and Clarke immediately incorporated the congregation and applied for papal approval of the order. On the 15 September 1877, Pope Pius IX issued the Decree of Approbation giving the order a temporary approval good for six years. In 1881, St. Mary's Academy was relocated to the present site of Clarke University and renamed Mount St. Joseph Academy. Clarke continued to push for full approval of the order's constitution, which was granted on 15 March 1885 by the Vatican. At that time, the sisters requested that Clarke be designated the Superior General for her lifetime. The Vatican deferred the decision to the Bishop of Dubuque, who gave his approval. Two years later, on 4 December 1887, Clarke died after a brief illness and was buried in the Mount Carmel Cemetery in Dubuque, Iowa. At the time that she died, Clarke and the order she had established had founded schools in 23 towns in Iowa, in Wisconsin, Chicago, Wichita and as far west as San Francisco. The order had grown from five initial members to 449 congregants. She was posthumously inducted into the Iowa Women's Hall of Fame in 1984.

== Bibliography ==
- Hudson, David; Bergman, Marvin; Horton, Loren (1 May 2009). The Biographical Dictionary of Iowa. Iowa City, Iowa: University of Iowa Press. ISBN 978-1-58729-724-3.
- Litoff, Judy Barrett (1994). European Immigrant Women in the United States: A Biographical Dictionary. New York: Garland Publishing. ISBN 978-0-8240-5306-2.
- Rose, Hugh James; Maitland, Samuel Roffey (1833). The British Magazine and Monthly Register of Religious and Ecclesiastical Information, Parochial History, and Documents Respecting the State of the Poor, Progress of Education, Etc. Vol. IV. Charing Cross, London: J. Petheram.
