= Judith Ann Mayotte =

American former Religious Sister, academic and humanitarian

- Born: Judith Ann Moberly; January 25, 1937 (age 89); Wichita, Kansas, United States
- Other name: Judy
- Spouse: Jack Mayotte (1972-75 – Deceased)

Judith Ann Mayotte (born January 25, 1937) is an American humanitarian, author, theologian, producer, former Catholic religious sister, ethicist, and university professor.

== Early life ==
She was born Judith Ann Moberly in Wichita, Kansas, where she grew up in the typical midwest household. During her first year in college she was stricken with polio. She then had to literally learn how to walk all over again. She soon turned to Catholicism and, against her father's wishes, became a religious sister.

== Sister of Charity ==
For 10 years Moberly lived as a member of the Sisters of Charity of the Blessed Virgin Mary, during which time she was known as Sister Mary Vivia, B.V.M. This being a teaching order, she worked in the inner cities of Los Angeles, Phoenix, Arizona, Milwaukee and Kansas City, Missouri. "That was my introduction to people on the margins of society," she says.

The changes in the way of life of members of Catholic religious orders mandated by Second Vatican Council held by the Catholic Church during the mid-1960s led Moberly to reassess her life, and she eventually left her religious congregation. She then taught juvenile delinquents for a while, and in 1976 earned a doctorate in theology at Marquette University.

Moberly soon married Jack Mayotte who was International Vice President for Square D. They were together only three years before he died of cancer in 1975.

== Television producer ==
Mayotte then spent time as a television producer. In 1978 she joined WTTW, Chicago's public broadcasting station, as the Director of Research for the News and Current Affairs Division. In 1982 she joined Turner Broadcasting as Senior Researcher and a producer for the Emmy and Peabody Award winning documentary series Portrait of America. In 1985 she won an Emmy for writing and producing the "Washington" segment of the series. In 1986 she joined the William Benton Fellowships in Broadcast Journalism at the University of Chicago as associate director and in 1988 became acting director.

It was during this time that Mayotte found herself drawn, inexplicably, she says, to refugee work. She simply realized one day that she wanted to venture overseas and work with the displaced: "It's something I can't really explain. It was just in my heart and my gut. I just didn't question it."

== Finding her passion ==
Mayotte applied for and received a grant from the MacArthur Foundation to write a book about refugees. In 1989, at age 51, she embarked on two years of living alone in Eritrea, Sudan, Pakistan, Thailand, and Cambodia. Her book, Disposable People? The Plight of Refugees, was published in 1992.

According to an article in the April 1997 issue of Johns Hopkins Magazine, in September 1993 Mayotte traveled to southern Sudan (now the independent nation of South Sudan) on behalf of Refugees International. She was gathering information on Operation Lifeline Sudan, whose 27 organizations, including UNICEF, were trying to feed 1.5 million people a day, all of them refugees created by Sudan's three-decade civil war. In tow was a film crew from a public television series, Visionaries. While in a village named Ayod, the crew decided to film an aerial supply drop. The article describes the event:

On the videotape of the program, you see aide workers laying out a large white X in an open field, marking the target for the drop. As the cargo plane comes into view, a worker explains that the Russian pilots will come in low, north-to-south, and drop mostly bags of grain. There is footage of a worker instructing the pilots by radio, followed by another shot of the plane, this time flying in low to the ground.

Suddenly, you hear someone yell and the cameraman begins to run. For reasons that have never been explained, the plane came in not north-to-south, but east-to-west, and dropped its cargo on top of the workers. In the video, it's clear from the wildly gyrating image that the cameraman, Paul Van Ness, is running for his life. Then he stops, and on the soundtrack you hear a holler. Someone has been hit. The next image is of a woman lying on the ground in agony. It's Judith Mayotte.

Maybe, because of polio, she couldn't run as fast as her colleagues. More likely, she was simply the victim of horrible luck. A 200-pound bag of grain, dropping at an estimated 120 miles per hour (190 km/h) had struck her, pulverizing her leg. That she is still alive she credits to some good luck: in Ayod that day was a relief doctor, Bernadette Kumar, who saved her life. On the airlift out, Mayotte nearly bled to death; at one point, Kumar could no longer find a pulse. In Nairobi, a doctor, working with 25-year-old technology, rebuilt Mayotte's femur. Physicians at the Mayo Clinic, where Mayotte ended up after being evacuated from Africa, were amazed by the Kenyan's work. He had saved her upper leg, but the lower leg was a wreck. Mayo physicians presented her with what she calls a non-choice: one, possibly two years of reconstructive surgery that might not work, or amputation of her leg below the knee. 'The accident stopped me from doing what I absolutely loved doing. I miss being overseas in the camps more than I can say. But I can't run from artillery shells anymore.

== State Department career ==
In 1994 Mayotte was appointed by the first Clinton Administration to the U.S. Department of State, Bureau of Population, Refugees, and Migration as a Special Adviser on refugee issues and policy. Before joining the State Department, she was Chairwoman of the Women's Refugee Commission, and served on the board of Refugees International. She was a member of the executive committee of the International Rescue Committee's board, one of the largest non-sectarian private voluntary organizations in the United States, and a Senior Fellow of the Refugee Policy Group of Washington, D.C.

Mayotte has written extensive reports, articles and editorial pieces, appeared on radio and television, and lectures on refugee and development issues. She has been called to testify as an expert witness before congressional committees concerned with the status of refugees and the direction of U.S. policy regarding the issue, and she has briefed officials of the United States government and United Nations.

== Academia ==
Mayotte then entered into academia. She taught on the faculty of Seattle University and in Johns Hopkins University's Paul H. Nitze School of Advanced International Studies. She later went on to be a professor in the Department of Theology at Marquette and was the Women's Chair in Humanistic Studies, during which time she helped to found the South Africa Service Learning Program in that nation. In 1994 for her work among refugees, Mayotte received Refugee Voices annual Mickey Leland Award and Refugees International's 1994 Award. In 1995 Mayotte received the Marymount Manhattan College Humanitarian Award and Georgetown University's Learning, Faith, and Freedom Medal. She served as a member of the June 1996 Foreign Policy faculty of the Salzburg Seminar and she was featured in one segment of the thirteen-part PBS television series and book, Visionaries, in her role of refugee advocate for Refugees International.

Mayotte currently serves on the Desmond Tutu Peace Foundation Board and Operating Committee, in connection with the Desmond Tutu Peace Centre and Leadership Academy in Cape Town, South Africa. She also serves on the board of the Visionaries Institute of Suffolk University in Massachusetts. She currently resides in Cape Town and is focusing on developing educational curriculum on peace and leadership.

Mayotte is the 2009 recipient of the Nuclear Age Peace Foundation's World Citizenship Award. Mayotte was named the first Desmond Tutu Distinguished Chair in Global Understanding for the Semester at Sea in 2010.

Mayotte moderated a Google Hangout between the Dalai Lama and Archbishop Desmond Tutu on October 8, 2011.

== Quotes ==
I have walked in so many war zones and so many refugee situations. I hope never again to see someone freshly blown up by a land mine. What I have seen ... there has to be a way for that not to happen.

== Bibliography ==
- Disposable people? The plight of refugees. Maryknoll, New York: Orbis Books. 1992.
