= Clarke University =

Catholic university in Dubuque, Iowa, US

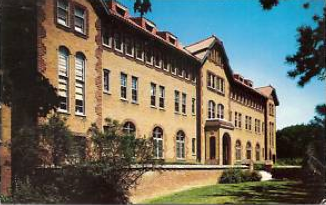
- Residential Hall
- Former names: St. Mary's Female Academy (1843–1881); Mount St. Joseph Academy and College (1881–1928); Clarke College (1928–2010)
- Type: Private university
- Established: 1843; 183 years ago
- Religious affiliation: Roman Catholic
- Endowment: $29.8 million (2025)
- President: Yvonne C. Zimmerman
- Students: 962 (fall 2024)
- Undergraduates: 815 (fall 2024)
- Postgraduates: 147 (fall 2024)
- Location: Dubuque, Iowa, U.S. 42.510°N 90.691°W
- Campus: Urban
- Colors: Navy Blue & Gold
- Nickname: Pride
- Sporting affiliations: NAIA – HAAC
- Mascot: Cutlass T. Crusader
- Website: clarke.edu

Clarke University is a private Catholic university in Dubuque, Iowa, United States. It was founded in 1843 as "St. Mary's Female Academy" by Mother Mary Frances Clarke, foundress of the Sisters of Charity of the Blessed Virgin Mary.

The campus sits on a bluff overlooking the Mississippi River and downtown Dubuque. Clarke offers undergraduate degrees in 19 academic departments with over 40 majors and programs. The university also provides graduate master's and doctoral degrees and enrolls approximately 962 students as of fall 2024.

== History ==
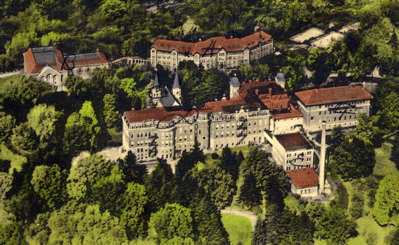
Postcard showing the campus before the fire

What is now known as Clarke University was established in 1843 as "St. Mary's Female Academy" by Irish emigrant Mother Mary Frances Clarke, the founder of the Sisters of Charity of the Blessed Virgin Mary. It was one of the first such schools for women built west of the Mississippi River.

In 1881, St. Mary's moved to its present location atop Dubuque's Seminary Hill (Clarke Drive) and was renamed "Mount St. Joseph Academy and College". The college became a liberal arts school in 1901, and the first bachelor's degree was awarded in 1904. In 1910, Mt. St. Joseph was chartered by the state of Iowa, becoming a four-year college by 1913. The North Central Association of Colleges and Secondary Schools accredited Mount St. Joseph in 1918. The academy portion of the school closed in 1928 and the college was renamed "Clarke College" to honor Mary Frances Clarke and her vision for the college written in 1884 to her community of sisters, almost all of whom were instructors: "Let us...keep our schools progressive with the times in which we live...In teaching, we must...endeavor to make [students] think."

On May 17, 1984, the school experienced a disastrous fire that destroyed four of its main buildings, including the Sacred Heart Chapel. The next day, students hung a large banner reading "Clarke Lives!" on the campus to show solidarity following the disaster. Soon after, the school launched a major reconstruction project to replace the destroyed buildings. By 1986, a new library, music performance hall, chapel, bookstore, administrative offices, and central atrium were dedicated. The massive, glass-enclosed Wahlert Atrium built following the fire has since become the main symbol of the school.

Joanne Burrows began her term as president on July 1, 2006, replacing the long-serving Catherine Dunn. On May 12, 2010, she announced that the college would be renamed Clarke University. In 2019 she was succeeded by Thom D. Chesney. After leading the university through the COVID-19 pandemic, Chesney resigned to take a personal sabbatical. The university's president is Yvonne C. Zimmerman.

== Campus ==
Clarke sits on a 55-acre (220,000 m^{2}) campus located atop a prominent hill in Dubuque. The college consists of 16 buildings, an athletic field, and features large, grassy knolls along the south and east sides of campus for areas of study and recreation. The grounds are bounded by West Locust Street on the south, Clarke Crest Court on the north, Clarke Crest Drive on the east, and North Grandview Avenue on the west. Clarke Drive is the "main street" through the campus, bisecting it into "north" and "south" sides. Of Clarke's 16 buildings, 15 are located along Clarke Drive, making it a very walkable campus.

== Athletics ==
The Clarke athletic teams are called the Pride. The university is a member of the National Association of Intercollegiate Athletics (NAIA), primarily competing in the Heart of America Athletic Conference (HAAC) since the 2016–17 academic year, after spending a season as an NAIA Independent within the Association of Independent Institutions (AII) during the 2015–16 school year (as well as during the 2006–07 school year when the school re-joined the NAIA). The Pride previously competed in the defunct Midwest Collegiate Conference (MCC) from 2007–08 to 2014–15 (when the conference dissolved), which they were a member on a previous stint from 1988–89 to 1995–96. Clarke was also a member of the defunct Northern Illinois-Iowa Conference (NIIC) of the NCAA Division III ranks from 1996–97 to 2005–06.

Clarke University women's basketball team was the 2022-23 NAIA national champion, defeating defending champion Thomas Moore University 63-52.

== Transportation ==
The university is located west of downtown Dubuque and served by The Jule transit system. The Orange Route stops on Clarke Drive and Locust Street connecting the university to downtown Dubuque.

== Notable alumni and staff ==
- Mariclare Costello, actress in many films including Ordinary People and TV series including The Waltons
- Nancy Dickerson, pioneering television newswoman, attended Clarke
- Margaret Feldner, first female president of Quincy University, former head of the education department at Clarke
- Luke Flynn, musician and film composer, attended Clarke (BA in Music Composition)
- Ruth Ann Gaines, Democratic Iowa State Representative, attended Clarke (BA in drama/speech)
- Sister Mary Kenneth Keller, nun and computer science pioneer. The first woman in the U.S. to receive a PhD in Computer Science, founded the computer science department at Clarke and headed the department for 20 years
- Barbara Larkin, United States Assistant Secretary of State for Legislative Affairs, attended Clarke (BA 1973)
- George R. R. Martin, Game of Thrones writer; taught English and journalism at Clarke
- Karen Morrow, musical theater actress/singer, attended Clarke
- Adam Rapp, novelist/playwright, attended Clarke
- Peggy Sullivan, library consultant specializing in executive searches, attended Clarke (BA 1950)

== See also ==
- Roman Catholic Archdiocese of Dubuque
