= Mary Kenneth Keller =

First American woman to receive a Ph.D. in computer science

Sister Mary Kenneth Keller B.V.M.
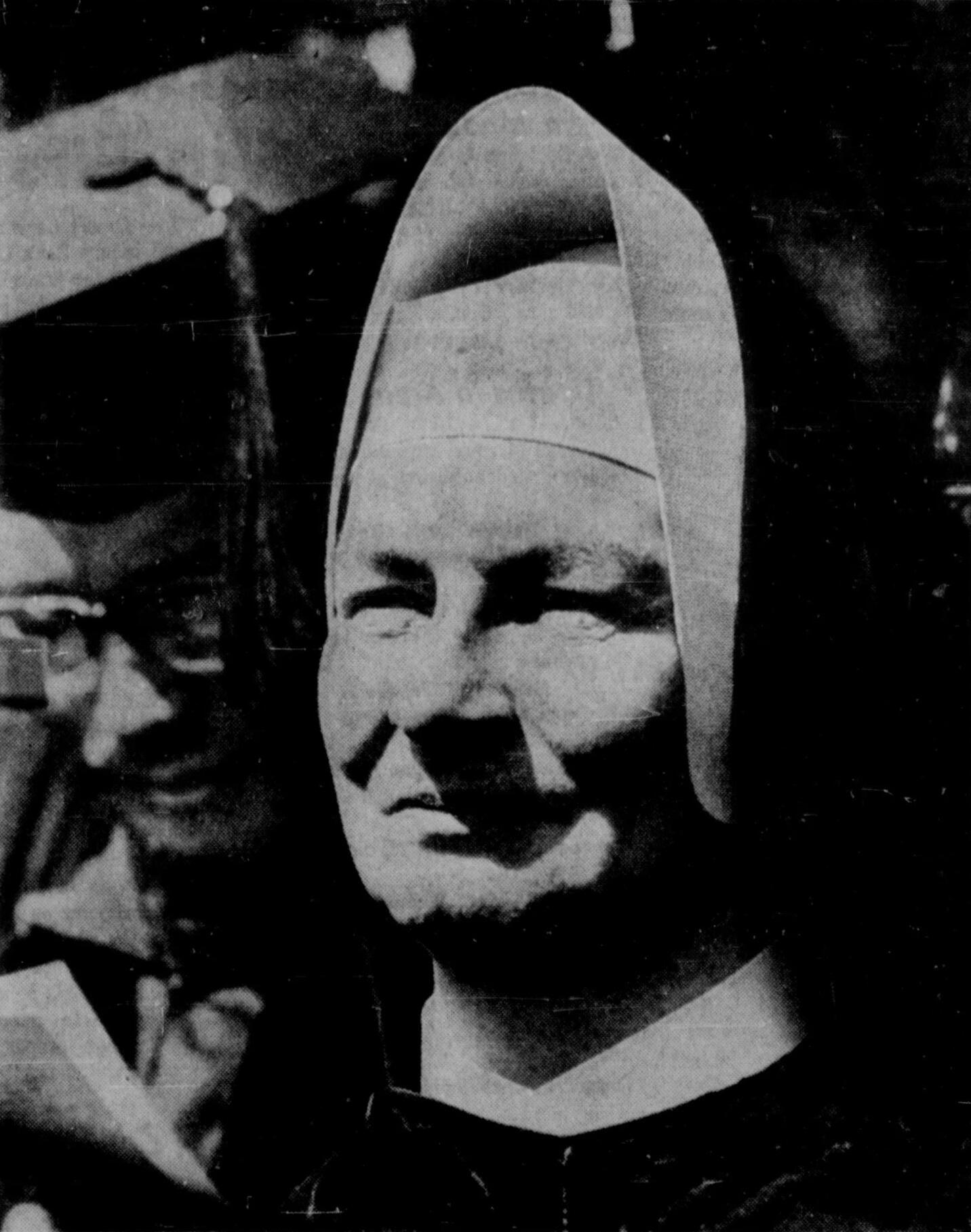
- Keller at her graduation ceremony, 1965
- Born: Evelyn Marie Keller; December 17, 1913; Cleveland, Ohio, United States
- Died: January 10, 1985 (aged 71); Dubuque, Iowa, United States
- Education: DePaul University (B.S., M.S.); University of Wisconsin–Madison (Ph.D.)
- Known for: BASIC
- Scientific career
- Workplaces: Clarke University
- Thesis: Inductive Inference on Computer Generated Patterns (1965)

Mary Kenneth Keller, B.V.M. (born Evelyn Marie Keller; December 17, 1913 – January 10, 1985) was an American Catholic religious sister, educator and pioneer in computer science. She was one of the first people, and the first woman to earn a Ph.D. in computer science in the United States. Keller and Irving C. Tang were the first two recipients of computer science doctorates (Keller's Ph.D. and Tang's D.Sc. were awarded on the same day).

== Early life and career ==
Evelyn Marie Keller was born in Cleveland, Ohio, on December 17, 1913, to John Adam Keller and Catherine Josephine (née Sullivan) Keller. She entered the Sisters of Charity of the Blessed Virgin Mary in 1932 and took her vows with that order in 1940, assuming the religious name Sister Mary Kenneth. She took the degree of Bachelor of Science in Mathematics in 1943 and that of Master of Science in Mathematics and Physics in 1953, at DePaul University in Chicago. She then took a Doctorate in Computer Science at the University of Wisconsin–Madison, graduating in 1965. Her dissertation, "Inductive Inference on Computer Generated Patterns", focused on "constructing algorithms that performed analytic differentiation on algebraic expression, written in CDC FORTRAN 63."

Throughout Keller's graduate studies, she was affiliated with various institutions, including the University of Michigan, Purdue, and Dartmouth. Keller participated in a summer program for high school teachers at Dartmouth College in 1961 where she worked with Thomas Kurtz, the father of the BASIC language, helping in its development. She became a proficient teacher of BASIC and co-wrote a prominent textbook on the subject in 1973.

Keller believed in the potential for computers to increase access to information and promote education. After finishing her doctorate in 1965, Keller founded the computer science department at Clarke College (now Clarke University), a Catholic women's college founded by the Sisters of Charity of the Blessed Virgin Mary in Dubuque, Iowa. That same year, that National Science Foundation awarded her a grant of $25,000 payable over two years for "instructional equipment for undergraduate education." One of the first computer science departments at a small college, Keller directed this department for twenty years. Clarke University now has the Keller Computer Center and Information Services, which is named after her and which provides computing and telecommunication support to Clarke College students, faculty members, and staff. The college has also established the Mary Kenneth Keller Computer Science Scholarship in her honor.

Keller was an advocate for the involvement of women in computing and the use of computers for education. She helped to establish the Association of Small Computer Users in Education (ASCUE). She went on to write four books in the field. At the ACM/SIGUCC User Services Conference in 1975, Keller declared "we have not fully used a computer as the greatest interdisciplinary tool that has been invented to date."

Keller died on January 10, 1985, at the age of 71.

== Bibliography ==
- Keller, Mary Kenneth (1965). Inductive inference on computer generated patterns (PhD Thesis). Madison, Wisconsin: The University of Wisconsin. (Doctoral Dissertation)
- Computer Graphics and Applications of Matrix Methods: Three-Dimensional Computer Graphics and Projections by Mary K. Keller; Consortium for Mathematics and Its Applications (U.S.); Undergraduate Mathematics and Its Applications Project, Lexington, Mass. (U.S.): COMAP/UMAP, 1983. U106, U110.
- Mathematical logic and probability with BASIC programming by William S. Dorn, Herbert J. Greenberg, and Mary K. Keller. Prindle, Weber & Schmidt, 1973
- Electrical circuits and Applications of matrix methods : analysis of linear circuits Mary K. Keller; Consortium for Mathematics and Its Applications; Undergraduate Mathematics and Its Applications Project, 1978. U108.
- Food service management and Applications of matrix methods : food service and dietary requirements by Mary K. Keller; Consortium for Mathematics and Its Applications (U.S.); Undergraduate Mathematics and Its Applications Project (U.S.) Lexington, MA : COMAP/UMAP, 1983. U105, U109.
- Markov Chains and Applications of Matrix Methods: Fixed Point and Absorbing Markov Chains by Mary K. Keller; Consortium for Mathematics and Its Applications; Undergraduate Mathematics and Its Applications Project, Lexington, Mass., U.S.: COMAP/UMAP, 1983. U107, U111.

== See also ==
- List of Christians in science and technology
- List of lay Catholic scientists
- Timeline of women in science
