= Thomas Rausch =

American Jesuit priest and theologian

The Reverend Thomas P. Rausch SJ

Personal life
- Born: 1941 (age 84–85)
- Education: Duke University
- Website: myweb.lmu.edu/trausch/

Religious life
- Religion: Catholicism
- Order: Society of Jesus

Thomas Peter Rausch SJ (born 1941) is the T. Marie Chilton Professor of Catholic Theology and professor of theological studies at Loyola Marymount University in Los Angeles, having received his doctorate from Duke University.

A systematic theologian specializing in the areas of Christology, ecclesiology, and ecumenism, he has published 22 books and over 280 articles and reviews. His book, Pope Benedict XVI: An Introduction to His Theological Vision, examines the theology of Benedict XVI, Pope Emeritus.

He has taught at Loyola Marymount since 1976.

In addition to his current endowed professorship at LMU, Fr. Rausch has also served as the Director of Campus Ministry, Chair of the Theological Studies Department, Associate Dean of the Bellarmine College of Liberal Arts, and Rector of the Jesuit Community. He has held visiting professorships throughout the world.

Beyond studying and writing about ecumenical theology, Fr. Rausch has also been an active participant in the ecumenical movement. In 1983–1984 he was appointed by the Secretariat for Christian Unity as Catholic Tutor to the Ecumenical Institute, the World Council of Churches study center at Bossey, Switzerland. He was a member of the U.S. Catholic/Southern Baptist Conversation 1994–2001 and one of the signatories of the Richard John Neuhaus/Charles Colson Evangelicals and Catholics Together 1997 document, "The Gift of Salvation." In 2001 he was appointed to the Roman Catholic/World Evangelical Alliance Consultation and serves as co-chair of the Los Angeles Catholic-Evangelical Committee. He presently is a member of the Anglican-Roman Catholic Consultation, USA. He also co-chairs the Theological Commission of the Archdiocese of Los Angeles.

He is frequently quoted on programs for the History Channel and other similar television channels. His writing has been heralded by fellow theologians across theological disciplines. As Peter C. Phan, the Chair of Catholic Social Thought at Georgetown University, has observed, "With his trademark clarity, accessibility, and depth, [Tom] Rausch helps us understand the essentials of our Christian faith in a church and world marked by polarization and conflict."

== Selected publications ==
- Authority and Leadership in the Church: Past Directions and Future Possibilities. Wilmington, Delaware: Michael Glazier. February 1989. ISBN 9780894537455. OCLC 18497771.
- Being Catholic in a Culture of Choice. Liturgical Press. 2006. ISBN 9780814659847.
- —; Clifford, Catherine E. (2003). Catholicism in the Third Millennium. Liturgical Press. ISBN 9780814658994.
- Educating for Faith and Justice: Catholic Higher Education Today. Liturgical Press. 2010. ISBN 9780814657164.
- Eschatology, Liturgy, and Christology: Toward Recovering an Eschatological Imagination. Liturgical Press. 2012. ISBN 9780814657355.
- Evangelizing America. Paulist Press. 2004. ISBN 9780809142408.
- Faith, Hope, and Charity: Benedict XVI on the Theological Virtues. Paulist Press. 2015. ISBN 9781587684883.
- Priesthood today : an appraisal. New York City: Paulist Press. 1992. ISBN 9780809133260. OCLC 25165102.
- Towards a Truly Catholic Church: An Ecclesiology for the Third Millennium. Liturgical Press. 2005. ISBN 9780814651872.
- Who is Jesus?: An Introduction to Christology. Liturgical Press. 2003. ISBN 9780814650783.
