= List of The New York Times number-one books of 1977 =

The American daily newspaper The New York Times publishes multiple weekly lists ranking the best-selling books in the United States.

== Fiction ==
The following list ranks the number-one best-selling fiction books, in the hardcover fiction category.

Date	Book	Author
January 2	Trinity	Leon Uris
January 9	Trinity	Leon Uris
January 16	Trinity	Leon Uris
January 23	Trinity	Leon Uris
January 30	Trinity	Leon Uris
February 6	Trinity	Leon Uris
February 13	Trinity	Leon Uris
February 20	Trinity	Leon Uris
February 27	Trinity	Leon Uris
March 6	Trinity	Leon Uris
March 13	Trinity	Leon Uris
March 20	Trinity	Leon Uris
March 27	Trinity	Leon Uris
April 3	Trinity	Leon Uris
April 10	Oliver's Story	Erich Segal
April 17	Oliver's Story	Erich Segal
April 24	Oliver's Story	Erich Segal
May 1	Oliver's Story	Erich Segal
May 8	Oliver's Story	Erich Segal
May 15	Oliver's Story	Erich Segal
May 22	Falconer	John Cheever
May 29	Oliver's Story	Erich Segal
June 5	Falconer	John Cheever
June 12	Falconer	John Cheever
June 19	The Thorn Birds	Colleen McCullough
June 26	The Thorn Birds	Colleen McCullough
July 3	The Thorn Birds	Colleen McCullough
July 10	The Thorn Birds	Colleen McCullough
July 17	The Thorn Birds	Colleen McCullough
July 24	The Thorn Birds	Colleen McCullough
July 31	The Thorn Birds	Colleen McCullough
August 7	The Thorn Birds	Colleen McCullough
August 14	The Thorn Birds	Colleen McCullough
August 21	The Thorn Birds	Colleen McCullough
August 28	The Thorn Birds	Colleen McCullough
September 4	The Thorn Birds	Colleen McCullough
September 11	The Thorn Birds	Colleen McCullough
September 18	The Thorn Birds	Colleen McCullough
September 25	The Thorn Birds	Colleen McCullough
October 2	The Silmarillion	J. R. R. Tolkien
October 9	The Silmarillion	J. R. R. Tolkien
October 16	The Silmarillion	J. R. R. Tolkien
October 23	The Silmarillion	J. R. R. Tolkien
October 30	The Silmarillion	J. R. R. Tolkien
November 6	The Silmarillion	J. R. R. Tolkien
November 13	The Silmarillion	J. R. R. Tolkien
November 20	The Silmarillion	J. R. R. Tolkien
November 27	The Silmarillion	J. R. R. Tolkien
December 4	The Silmarillion	J. R. R. Tolkien
December 11	The Silmarillion	J. R. R. Tolkien
December 18	The Silmarillion	J. R. R. Tolkien
December 25	The Silmarillion	J. R. R. Tolkien

== Nonfiction ==
The following list ranks the number-one best-selling nonfiction books, in the hardcover nonfiction category.

Date	Book	Author
January 2	Roots	Alex Haley
January 9	Roots	Alex Haley
January 16	Roots	Alex Haley
January 23	Roots	Alex Haley
January 30	Roots	Alex Haley
February 6	Roots	Alex Haley
February 13	Roots	Alex Haley
February 20	Roots	Alex Haley
February 27	Roots	Alex Haley
March 6	Roots	Alex Haley
March 13	Roots	Alex Haley
March 20	Roots	Alex Haley
March 27	Roots	Alex Haley
April 3	Roots	Alex Haley
April 10	Roots	Alex Haley
April 17	Roots	Alex Haley
April 24	Roots	Alex Haley
May 1	Roots	Alex Haley
May 8	Your Erroneous Zones	Wayne W. Dyer
May 15	Your Erroneous Zones	Wayne W. Dyer
May 22	Your Erroneous Zones	Wayne W. Dyer
May 29	Your Erroneous Zones	Wayne W. Dyer
June 5	Your Erroneous Zones	Wayne W. Dyer
June 12	Your Erroneous Zones	Wayne W. Dyer
June 19	Your Erroneous Zones	Wayne W. Dyer
June 26	Your Erroneous Zones	Wayne W. Dyer
July 3	Your Erroneous Zones	Wayne W. Dyer
July 10	Your Erroneous Zones	Wayne W. Dyer
July 17	Your Erroneous Zones	Wayne W. Dyer
July 24	The Book of Lists	David Wallechinsky, Irving Wallace and Amy Wallace
July 31	The Book of Lists	David Wallechinsky, Irving Wallace and Amy Wallace
August 7	Your Erroneous Zones	Wayne W. Dyer
August 14	Your Erroneous Zones	Wayne W. Dyer
August 21	Looking Out for Number One	Robert Ringer
August 28	Your Erroneous Zones	Wayne W. Dyer
September 4	The Book of Lists	David Wallechinsky, Irving Wallace and Amy Wallace
September 11	All Things Wise and Wonderful	James Herriot
September 18	All Things Wise and Wonderful	James Herriot
September 25	All Things Wise and Wonderful	James Herriot
October 2	All Things Wise and Wonderful	James Herriot
October 9	All Things Wise and Wonderful	James Herriot
October 16	All Things Wise and Wonderful	James Herriot
October 23	All Things Wise and Wonderful	James Herriot
October 30	All Things Wise and Wonderful	James Herriot
November 6	All Things Wise and Wonderful	James Herriot
November 13	All Things Wise and Wonderful	James Herriot
November 20	All Things Wise and Wonderful	James Herriot
November 27	All Things Wise and Wonderful	James Herriot
December 4	All Things Wise and Wonderful	James Herriot
December 11	All Things Wise and Wonderful	James Herriot
December 18	All Things Wise and Wonderful	James Herriot
December 25	All Things Wise and Wonderful	James Herriot

== See also ==
- Publishers Weekly list of bestselling novels in the United States in the 1970s
