= Alben (name) =

Alben is both a surname and a given name. Notable people with the name include:

- Alben W. Barkley (1877–1956), American lawyer and politician, 35th vice president of the United States
- Alex Alben (born 1958), American politician and writer
- Işıl Alben (born 1986), Turkish basketball player
- Russ Alben (1929–2012), American advertising executive and composer
- Silas D. Alben, 21st century American mathematician
