= Alben =

Alben could refer to:

- Elbling, a kind of plant
- Albendazole, broad-spectrum medicine
- Planina, Postojna, a village in Slovenia
- Alben Square, a square in Brooklyn, New York, U.S.
- Alben (name)

- Alben W. Barkley (1877–1956), former vice president of the United States
