= The R Document =

Book by Irving Wallace

- First edition (US)
- Author: Irving Wallace
- Language: English
- Subject: Political science
- Genre: Political thriller Legal thriller
- Publisher: Simon & Schuster (US); Cassell (UK)
- Publication place: United States
- English publication date: January 1, 1976
- Pages: 383
- Preceded by: The Fan Club (1974)
- Followed by: The Pigeon Project (1979)

The R Document (1976), by Irving Wallace, is a novel in the genres of the political thriller and the legal thriller, which recounts a secret coup d’état by the director of the Federal Bureau of Investigation (FBI) to void the Bill of Rights and so assume chief executive power in the United States.

== Plot summary ==
The novel is set in the near future, when the United States is experiencing a severe crisis caused by rising crime, particularly violent crime. In response to this situation, Vernon T. Tynan, Director of the FBI and a former associate of J. Edgar Hoover, promotes the ratification of a Thirty-fifth Amendment to the United States Constitution that would allow the temporary suspension of the Bill of Rights during a national emergency. Although the proposal is presented as a measure to combat crime, Tynan has secretly devised a two-stage plan, codenamed the "Document R"—the "R" standing for "Reconstruction"—intended to use the new amendment to establish an authoritarian regime.

The story's protagonist is Christopher Collins, the Attorney General of the United States. Shortly after taking office, his predecessor, former Army Colonel Noah Baxter, dies from a stroke before he can reveal the existence of Document R and the danger it poses. Before his death, Baxter mentions the plan during a confession to a priest, prompting Tynan to order FBI Deputy Associate Director Harry Adcock to obtain the contents of the confession through blackmail. The attempt fails because the priest refuses to violate the seal of confession, although he is able to pass on to Collins the limited information that Baxter managed to communicate before his death.

Meanwhile, Tynan resorts to blackmail to secure the ratification of the Thirty-fifth Amendment, using confidential files inherited from the Hoover era to extort California legislators whose votes are crucial to its approval. Collins, a native of California, is persuaded to defend the proposal publicly on the television program Search for the Truth. Before the broadcast, Tynan attempts to compromise him by arranging for a prostitute to enter his hotel room, but the scheme fails.

During the televised debate, Collins confronts Tony Pierce, a former FBI agent who resigned after clashing with Tynan and now leads the organization Defenders of the Bill of Rights (DBR), which was founded to prevent the amendment's passage. As the discussion progresses, Collins realizes that he is defending a measure that would destroy the nation's constitutional liberties, driven solely by his personal ambition and his desire to prove himself worthy in the memory of his late father. Deeply shaken after the debate, he acknowledges that he has been supporting the wrong cause.

Collins's own son, Josh, a member of DBR, reinforces his father's doubts by pointing out that no genuine democracy permits fundamental rights to be suspended in peacetime. Sensing the Attorney General's change of heart, Tynan and Adcock decide to discredit him through surveillance, wiretapping, and other covert operations. To finance these activities without involving President Andrew Wadsworth, Tynan turns to Donald Radenbaugh, a lawyer and former friend of Baxter who is serving an unjust prison sentence for extortion. After securing his release under a false identity, Tynan uses illegally obtained campaign contributions to stage the murder of that fictitious identity. Horrified by Tynan's actions, Radenbaugh decides to cooperate with Collins.

Radenbaugh then reveals the contents of the first part of Document R. He explains that Tynan conceived the Thirty-fifth Amendment after studying communities with low crime rates and concluding that so-called company towns, where civil liberties were severely restricted, maintained the highest levels of public order. Among them was Argo City, Arizona, owned by Argo Smelting and Mining. There, Tynan conducted a security experiment that served as the pilot program for the system he intended to implement throughout the country, and its results constitute the first part of Document R.

Armed with this information, Collins, Radenbaugh, and John G. Maynard, Chief Justice of the United States, travel to Argo City to investigate the experiment firsthand. After discovering the extent of the abuses committed there, Maynard decides to expose the project publicly, but Tynan orders his assassination before he can do so.

In order to retain his position as FBI Director, Tynan also launches a smear campaign against Karen, Collins's wife. He first attempts to reopen an old murder case in which she had been accused before meeting her husband, despite the fact that the trial had ended without a conviction and that the overwhelming majority of the jury believed she was innocent. When this effort fails, he spreads false allegations about her private life in an attempt to destroy the Collins family's reputation.

Meanwhile, Collins strengthens his alliance with Pierce and several former FBI agents who left the Bureau after suffering retaliation from Tynan. The group, informally known as the IFBI (Investigators of the Federal Bureau of Investigation), continues gathering evidence against the FBI Director. During their investigation, they discover that Rick Baxter, Noah Baxter's grandson, had accidentally recorded the conversation between his grandfather, Tynan, and Adcock on the day Baxter suffered his stroke. Although Adcock succeeds in seizing and destroying the original recording, Karen realizes that Ishmael Young, a writer whom Tynan had blackmailed into writing his autobiography, may possess a copy.

Young ultimately produces the recording, whose authenticity is verified. Thanks to this evidence, Collins reveals the contents of the second part of Document R to the California legislators. The recording proves that Tynan intended to deliberately create the national emergency required to invoke the Thirty-fifth Amendment by arranging the assassination of the President of the United States. Once the emergency had been declared, the Attorney General would be empowered to suspend the Bill of Rights, allowing Tynan to consolidate virtually absolute power. The exposure of the conspiracy leads to the amendment's unanimous rejection and preserves the constitutional system. Cornered, Tynan commits suicide by shooting himself in the mouth, while Adcock disappears without a trace. In the epilogue, the President grants Donald Radenbaugh a full pardon and establishes a commission, including Collins and Pierce, to purge the FBI, reform the Bureau, and promote a comprehensive program of economic and social reforms aimed at addressing the underlying causes of crime that Tynan had exploited as the pretext for his plot.

== Commercial Reception ==
The R Document spent 13 weeks on the New York Times best seller list, peaking at #3.

== Adaptation ==
The book was produced as a mini-series in the Soviet Union in 1985 by Valery Kharchenko. The majority of the characters were acted out by actors from Latvia and Estonia, both of which were then Soviet Socialist Republics. However, as it accused the American government of being run secretly, from behind the scenes, by an evil, tyrannical cabal and completely negated Wallace's own civil-libertarian arguments, he publicly disowned it. No other known adaptations of The R Document were produced during Wallace's lifetime.
