= What Really Happened to the Class of '65? (TV series) =

- Genre: Drama anthology
- Created by: Tony Bill
- Based on: What Really Happened to the Class of '65? by Michael Medved and David Wallechinsky
- Starring: Tony Bill
- Narrated by: Tony Bill
- Theme music composer: Don Costa
- Country of origin: United States
- Original language: English
- No. of seasons: 1
- No. of episodes: 14

Production
- Producers: Richard Irving; Jack Laird
- Cinematography: Fred Jackman Jr.; Steven Poster; Bernie Abramson; Fred Goodich
- Editor: Anthony Milch
- Running time: 60 min
- Production company: Universal Television

Original release
- Network: NBC
- Release: December 8, 1977 – March 25, 1978

What Really Happened to the Class of '65? is an American anthology drama television series produced and aired in 1977–1978, created by Tony Bill. The series was inspired by the bestselling book What Really Happened to the Class of '65? by David Wallechinsky and Michael Medved. It was produced by George Eckstein.

== Summary ==
The drama of the show revolved around the main character, played by Tony Bill, who had graduated from the class of 1965 in Bret Harte High School, and who has now returned as a teacher to the school. The show would begin with his character opening up the old school photo book, flicking to a photo, and pondering what had happened to that particular student. The show would then show the story of that student, with Bill narrating.

The show featured music from the era, and was described as "a cross breed between Happy Days and Peyton Place" The show debuted at 10 pm on NBC on December 8, 1977.

Grant High School in Van Nuys was used as a filming location for the series.

== Cast ==
Tony Bill played the main character, Sam Ashley. The rest of the cast of the show featured many of the mainstay actors of the 1970s, including Cliff De Young, Leslie Nielsen, John Ritter, Annette O'Toole, Meredith Baxter Birney, John Rubinstein, Jessica Walter, and Paul Burke.

== Episode list ==
No.	Title	Directed by	Written by	Original release date	PC
1	"Everybody's Girl"	Harry Falk	Ann M. Beckett	December 8, 1977	49234
2	"Class Hustler"	Richard Irving	Peter S. Fischer	December 15, 1977	49223
3	"Class Dreamers"	James M. Miller	James M. Miller	December 22, 1977	49220
4	"The Girl Nobody Knew"	Edward Parone	John Kurland	December 29, 1977	49229
5	"Class Athlete" "Class Jock"	Harry Falk	Walter Koenig	January 5, 1978	49206
6	"Class Crusader"	Larry Dobkin	Linda B. Elstad	January 12, 1978	49219
7	"The Girl Who Always Said No"	Seymour Robbie	Robert Blees	January 19, 1978	49237
8	"Class Clown"	Ron Satloff	Robert Janes	January 26, 1978	49240
9	"The Most Likely to Succeed"	Leo Penn	Gregory Hoblit	February 9, 1978	49228
10	"Class Underachiever"	Jack Laird	S : Jack Laird; T : Art Eisenson	February 16, 1978	49217
11	"Mr. Potential"	James Sheldon	Robert Hamilton	February 23, 1978	49236
12	"Class Renegade"	Alan J. Levi	Priscilla English	March 2, 1978	49233
13	"The Misfit"	Jules Irving	Charles E. Israel	March 9, 1978	49245
14	"Reunion in Terror"	Richard Irving	S : Peter S. Fischer; T : Ann M. Beckett	March 25, 1978	49249
