= Palisades Charter High School =

Public, charter school in California, US

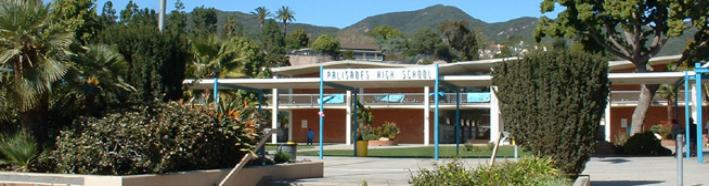

Location
- 15777 Bowdoin Street; Pacific Palisades, Los Angeles, California 90272; United States; 34°02′52″N 118°31′52″W

Information
- Other names: Palisades High School (1961–1993)
- Type: Public, charter
- Established: 1961
- School district: Los Angeles Unified School District
- NCES School ID: 060148804593
- Principal: Pamela Magee
- Teaching staff: 132.52 (FTE)
- Grades: 9–12
- Gender: Coeducational
- Enrollment: 2,991 (2023–24)
- Student to teacher ratio: 24.21
- Colors: Royal blue, Columbia blue, and white
- Athletics conference: CIF Los Angeles City Section; Western League
- Mascot: Dewey Dolphin
- Nickname: Dolphins
- Newspaper: Tideline
- Website: palihigh.org

Palisades Charter High School (usually colloquially known as Pali or Pali High and abbreviated as PCHS) is an independent charter secondary school in Los Angeles, United States. The high school serves the neighborhoods of Pacific Palisades, Palisades Highlands, Kenter Canyon, and portions of Brentwood (including Brentwood Circle). Residents in Topanga, an unincorporated section of Los Angeles County, may attend Palisades or William Howard Taft Charter High School.

The school serves grades 9 through 12. Formerly directly administered by the Los Angeles Unified School District (LAUSD), the school is now an independent charter school. In the year following the 2025 Palisades fire, the school’s enrollment decreased to approximately 2,500 students. Many students travel long distances to attend Palisades Charter High, which is one of the most highly ranked public high schools in the Los Angeles area.

In 2005, Palisades was recognized as a California Distinguished School. In 2015, Palisades was named one of America's Best High Schools by Newsweek and U.S. News & World Report.

Paul Revere Charter Middle School students are allowed to attend as a feeder school.

In early 2025, parts of the school were damaged by the Palisades Fire, forcing the school to temporarily close its campus. Instruction was moved to the former Sears building in Santa Monica thereafter. The school reopened the following year in January.

== History ==
The school was founded in 1961. It was built for $6 million on a filled-in canyon. At the time it was the most expensive high school in the LA City Schools. The founding principal was Herbert L. Aigner (died in 2000). The Class of 2012 was the 50th graduating class.

Prior to the founding, the property was called All Hallows Farm and for many years was owned by the Conway family: Hollywood film director Jack Conway; his wife, actress Virginia Conway — daughter of silent screen star Francis X. Bushman — and their two sons, one of whom, Pat Conway became an actor as well. This property was subsequently rented to actress Debbie Reynolds and her husband, singer Eddie Fisher. It was then taken, some years later, by the State by eminent domain to build the high school.

Several members of the class of 1965 were profiled in a Time magazine article, which led to a best-selling 1976 book by class members David Wallechinsky and Michael Medved, What Really Happened to the Class of '65? The book featured interviews with several members of the class, whose experiences were recounted both individually and in groupings around shared themes such as the Vietnam War and the draft, drug experimentation, and sex. Various teachers from the school also were interviewed, among them French teacher Mr. Fred Johnson, and English teachers Miss Jean O'Brien and Mrs. Rose "Mama G" Gilbert, who retired during 2012–13 after 63 years of teaching. At age 94, Mrs. Gilbert was the oldest active teacher in the LAUSD. The Star Wars character of Maz Kanata was based on her. The success of the book later inspired a short-lived television dramatic anthology series of the same title, which ran from December 1977 to July 1978 on NBC.

In 1989 20/20 aired an episode about the students of Palisades High School. Howard Rosenberg of the Los Angeles Times wrote that "Palisades High School is characterized here as both an institution of high academic performance and high drug and alcohol use. What 20/20 doesn't ask tonight is how both are possible at the same school."

Circa 1992 there were so few students that LAUSD was considering closing the school. Pali High parents, principal Merle Price, and Pali High staff decided to advocate for making the school into a charter school. In 1993 the school, along with three feeder elementary schools, received approval from the Los Angeles Board of Education to become a charter school. This was the first time a group of schools in California became charter schools. The school asked students to abide by a behavior code and instituted new academic programs. By 1998 student enrollment recovered: it had 200 students previously attending private schools.

This school was the focus of a false email chain letter started around 2002. The message falsely claimed that a satiric message to parents about student truancies and homework problems was actually on the school's answering machine. The message was originally written in response to parent outrage that students who skipped class more than 10 days per 90-schoolday semester (not counting legitimate absences, like sickness) could receive a failing grade in that class. The hoax was covered on several websites, including Snopes, and BreakTheChain.org.

=== Palisades fire ===
During the January 2025 Southern California wildfires, the Palisades Fire damaged parts of the school, forcing it to temporarily close. The school was not in session when the fires occurred, due to it taking place during their winter break. It was estimated that about 40 percent of the campus had sustained damages or been destroyed. Much of the school's main buildings, including the gym, aquatic center, and baseball field stayed intact. In a subsequent press release, Principal Pamela Magee stated the school would be temporarily be transitioning to online learning, while the school searches for a temporary campus to hold instruction until it is deemed safe to return.

School officials worked with the City of Santa Monica to establish an interim campus at the former Sears building in Downtown Santa Monica. The building had been unoccupied since it closed in 2017. Dubbed "Pali South", it opened in April that year after significant renovations. The school continued using the interim campus for the rest of the fall 2025 semester, and returned to its main campus on January 27, 2026.

== Campus ==
The campus is bounded by Temescal Canyon Road to the east, Sunset Boulevard to the north, El Medio Street to the west, and Temescal Academy (formerly known as first Temescal Canyon Continuation School and later Temescal High School) to the south. It is bisected by Bowdoin Street, which runs between the school's football field and the academic center of the school. Located only a mile from Will Rogers State Beach, the football stadium is called "Stadium by the Sea."

On April 25, 2021, the music video for Olivia Rodrigo's song "Good 4 U" was filmed at Palisades, directed by Petra Collins. The song later debuted at #1 on the Billboard Hot 100.

As of 2010, approximately 43% of the student body, 1,180 out of 2,742 students, were bused to Palisades Charter High School from more than 100 Los Angeles zip codes. In 1994, approximately 70% of the student body, 1,176 out of 1,680 students, were bused from South-Central and East Los Angeles.

== Demographics ==
| White | Latino | African American | Asian | Pacific Islander | American Indian | Two or more races |
|---|---|---|---|---|---|---|
| 51% | 24% | 15% | 9% | 1% | 1% | 1% |

According to U.S. News & World Report, 49% of Palisades Charter's student body is "of color," with 32% of the student body coming from an economically disadvantaged household, determined by student eligibility for California's reduced-price meal program.

== Curriculum ==
As of 1998, most of the school's classes were university preparatory in nature. It hosts a mathematics, science, and technology magnet program. The school also has humanities and marine biology courses.

The school includes a New Media Academy that was, as of 1998, one of three in LAUSD. Pali High uses its charter school status to increase the visibility of this program. By that year DreamWorks had financed it with $100,000. The location fees generated by Aaron Spelling's use of the school for Malibu Shores were used to, by 1998, install a new computer lab.

As of 2002, Palisades High School offered a surfing class that can be taken for physical education credit. It was established around 1998 by Ray Millette, a marine biology teacher and surfer.

Palisades Charter High School is known for its music program. Its marching band has medaled three years in a row at the SCSBOA championships: in 2013 winning silver, in 2014 winning gold for 3A, and in 2015 winning bronze. The school also has a winter drumline that competes in both SCPA and WGI, and is also the 2016 SCPA "A class" silver medalist.

== Discrimination and lawsuits ==
In 2016, extensive hate graffiti was found at the campus including references to the Ku Klux Klan, Jews, African-Americans, and LGBTQ people.

In June 2017, Palisades Charter High School gained national media attention after an African-American student was depicted in a student blog with a noose drawn around her neck.

In December 2021, following a false school shooting threat targeting Pali as well as other schools in the area, along with an offensive comment made over the announcement system by a male dean on the way female students were dressing, extensive graffiti was discovered on the campus. Among other things, messages proclaiming "Black Lives Matter" and "Kill the Dean" were spray-painted, along an anarchy symbol and symbols of other extremist political movements. Additionally, during the panic of the false shooting threat, after hundreds of students started fleeing the campus in fear, security guards at the school were instructed by the school's admin to attempt to stop students from leaving, despite the threat to their safety, according to first-hand student accounts. After these instructions were ignored by students fearing for their lives, the school put out a statement to students and parents declaring that all those who left school during the panic were to receive a week's worth of unexcused absences. This statement was later retracted due to backlash from parents and students.

== Notable alumni ==
- J. J. Abrams '84 – director, screenwriter, and television show creator
- Alex Alben '76 – author, columnist, internet executive
- Amy Alcott '75 – Hall of Fame golfer
- Scott Alexander – screenwriter
- David Baerwald '78 – composer, songwriter, musician, producer
- Aimee Bender – writer
- Karen Bender – writer
- A. Scott Berg '67 – Pulitzer Prize-winning biographer
- Lucas Braun '19 – professional baseball player
- Jeanie Buss '79 – president and co-owner of Los Angeles Lakers, serves on NBA's board of governors
- Brian Dailey '69 – artist and international security
- J. D. Daniels – The Mighty Ducks and Going Places former child actor
- Stephen M. Daniels '64 – attorney, Chair of the Civilian Board of Contract Appeals
- Scott Davis – tennis player
- Peter DeLuise – '84 - actor
- Dane Elkins (born 1999) – professional racquetball player
- Chip Engelland '79 –- Duke University basketball player, NBA coach
- Roy Fegan '79 – actor, Hollywood Shuffle and The Five Heartbeats
- Chris Ferguson – poker player
- Michael Freedman '69 – Fields Medal in mathematics
- Max Graham '87 – record producer and DJ
- Alex Greenwald – actor and musician
- Rusty Hamer '64 – actor
- Susanna Hoffs '76 – member of The Bangles
- Willa Holland – actress
- David Holt winter '64 – musician with multiple Grammy Awards for bluegrass and traditional music
- Raffi Hovannisian '77 – first Foreign Minister of independent Armenia
- Nick Itkin '17 – Olympic bronze medalist, foil fencer, junior world champion
- Elizabeth Keifer '79 – actress
- Steve Kerr '83 – five-time NBA champion as a player, four-time NBA champion as a coach of Golden State Warriors
- Perry Klein (born 1971) – football quarterback in the National Football League for the Atlanta Falcons
- Jennifer Jason Leigh – Oscar-nominated actress and director
- Ahmad Ali Lewis – hip-hop artist, member of 4th Avenue Jones
- Daniel S. Loeb – hedge fund manager
- Lauren London – actress
- Ricci Luyties – professional indoor volleyball and beach volleyball player, head coach of UC San Diego Tritons women's team
- Jeff Madsen – poker player, former youngest winner of World Series of Poker bracelet
- Ron Mael and Russell Mael – musicians (the band Sparks)
- Michael Medved '65 – film critic, radio host, commentator
- Harold Meyerson '66 - Editor of the American Prospect
- Penelope Ann Miller '81 – Tony Award and Golden Globe-nominated actress
- Jon Moscot '09 – American-Israeli major league baseball pitcher (Cincinnati Reds)
- Deroy Murdock '82 – syndicated columnist, political commentator
- Matthew Nelson and Gunnar Nelson – musicians, formerly of chart-topping early '90s band Nelson
- David Newman – film score composer '71
- Thomas Newman '73 – film score composer
- Eddy Oh – musician, member of JJCC
- Philip Price '78 – musician, lead singer of the band Winterpills
- Redfoo (Stefan Kendal Gordy) – musician, member of LMFAO
- David Roback – musician, Rain Parade, Opal, Mazzy Star
- Stephen Rosenbaum '83 – visual effects supervisor
- Antonio Sabàto Jr. (born 1972) – Italian-American model, actor, and aspiring politician
- Jean Sagal and Liz Sagal – former Doublemint Twins and sisters of Katey Sagal
- Katey Sagal – Married with Children and Sons of Anarchy actress
- Michael Sandel '71 – professor at Harvard
- Kim Schrier '86 – U.S. Representative of Washington's 8th congressional district
- Jay Schroeder '79 – former NFL quarterback – Washington Redskins, Los Angeles Raiders, Cincinnati Bengals, Arizona Cardinals
- Geoff Schwartz – former NFL offensive lineman – Carolina Panthers, Minnesota Vikings, Kansas City Chiefs, New York Giants
- Mitchell Schwartz – 3-time all-pro NFL offensive lineman – Cleveland Browns, Kansas City Chiefs
- Adam Shankman '82 – director and choreographer
- Stephen Silberkraus – Nevada State Assemblyman, District 29
- Tony Sills – PGA Tour golfer
- Amy Smart '94 – actress
- Alan Smolinisky – entrepreneur, real estate investor, owner of the Los Angeles Dodgers
- Kent Steffes – Olympic gold medalist, beach volleyball (1996), professional beach volleyball player
- Randy Stoklos '78 – professional beach volleyball player
- Ted Stryker '89 – KROQ-FM DJ
- Syd – DJ producer and singer
- Hallie Todd '79 – actress (maiden name: Hallie Eckstein)
- Malcolm Todd – singer-songwriter and musician
- Audrey Hobert – singer-songwriter and musician
- Michael Trope '69 – trial lawyer, co-founder of Trope and Decarolis; previous sports agent
- Kiki Vandeweghe '76 – UCLA and NBA forward, general manager of Denver Nuggets
- David Wallechinsky '65 – author and essayist
- Chris Watts '82 – visual effects supervisor
- Forest Whitaker '79 – Academy Award-winning actor
- will.i.am (William James Adams Jr.) '93 – musician, member of The Black Eyed Peas
- Gregg Zuckerman '66 – mathematician at Yale and the Institute for Advanced Study

== Sending schools ==
As some LAUSD zoned high schools do not have enough space to educate all residents in their attendance boundaries, some schools send excess students to Palisades.

They were, as of spring 2007:

- Belmont
- Crenshaw
- Dorsey
- Fairfax
- Fremont
- Hamilton
- Hollywood
- Jefferson
- Los Angeles
- Manual Arts
- Santee Education Complex
- Van Nuys
- Washington Preparatory
