= Sharara =

- Directed by: Rajendra Singh Babu
- Produced by: R J Chakravarti
- Starring: Raaj Kumar; Shatrughan Sinha; Hema Malini; Mithun Chakraborty; Tina Munim; Vijayendra Ghatge
- Music by: Laxmikant-Pyarelal
- Release date: 24 February 1984
- Running time: 135 minutes
- Country: India
- Language: Hindi

Sharara is a 1984 Indian Hindi-language film directed by Rajendra Singh Babu, starring Raaj Kumar, Shatrughan Sinha, Hema Malini, Mithun Chakraborty, Tina Munim, Vijayendra Ghatge, Ranjeet, Shakti Kapoor and Kader Khan. The playwright of the movie is senior story writer late H. V. Subba Rao. The plot of the movie was inspired by the 1980 political thriller novel The Second Lady by Irving Wallace.

== Cast ==
- Raaj Kumar as Dharam Veer Singh Pathan
- Shatrughan Sinha as Vicky
- Hema Malini as Madhu / Champavati (Dual Role)
- Mithun Chakraborty as Deepak
- Tina Munim as Rashmi
- Vijayendra Ghatge as Ramakant
- Ranjeet as Simon
- Shakti Kapoor as Mr. Kapoor
- Kader Khan as K. K.

== Songs ==
All songs are written by Anand Bakshi. Soundtrack is available on CBS Gramophones Records and Tapes.

Song	Singer
"Shabnam Ka Yeh Katra Hai" (Part 1)	Lata Mangeshkar
"Shabnam Ka Yeh Katra Hai" (Part 2)	Lata Mangeshkar
"Maine Kiya, Tumne Kiya"	Asha Bhosle, Suresh Wadkar
"Babuji Babuji Babuji"	Asha Bhosle, Suresh Wadkar
