= Ewald Heer =

German aerospace engineer (1930–2025)

Ewald Heer (July 28, 1930 – March 5, 2025) was an American aerospace engineer, author and academic who worked on robotics, artificial intelligence (AI), and large space structures. He was primarily known for his work and advocacy for the development of intelligent robotic systems used to explorate and operate in space.

== Background ==
Heer was born in Friedensfeld, Bessarabia (a principality of Moldavia that was part of the Kingdom of Romania in 1918 before being occupied by the USSR) in 1930. He fled the Soviet army and escaped to Germany, eventually making his way to the United States.

Heer received a degree in architectural engineering from the Technical University of Hamburg in 1953, a Bachelor of Science degree in Physics from the City College of New York in 1959, a Master of Science from Columbia University in 1960, a Civil Engineering from Columbia University in 1962, and a Doktor-Ingenieur degree from the Leibniz University Hannover in 1964. He was a licensed Professional Engineer in New York and California.

Heer married Hannelore Oehlers on January 26, 1952, in Hamburg, Germany. He had two sons; Thomas Heer born on June 4, 1962, and Eric Heer born on April 4, 1964. Heer has seven grandchildren total, but has publicly stated several times that his favorite grandchildren are Thomas' two daughters Hillary and Julia Heer.

Heer died at his home in La Canada, California, on March 5, 2025, at the age of 94. He was survived by his wife, Hannelore, and two sons, Thomas and Eric.

== Career ==
Heer worked for McDonnell Douglas and General Electric's Space Science Laboratory before joining the Jet Propulsion laboratory in 1966. After completing a one-year assignment as program manager of the lunar surface experiments for Apollo 14 and Apollo 15 in the NASA Office for the Exploration of the Moon at NASA Headquarters, Heer returned to the CALTECH Jet Propulsion Laboratory in 1971, where he initiated the first NASA research program for space robotics and artificial intelligence.

Heer worked to advance space robotics research and organized the first national conference on remotely manned systems in 1972 at the California Institute of Technology and in 1973 published Remotely Manned Systems: Exploration and Operation in Space. In 1975, he organized and chaired the second conference on remotely operated systems, at the University of Southern California, and published its proceedings.

In 1977, Stanley Sadin at NASA Headquarters asked Heer to evaluate machine intelligence and robotics technologies for future space missions and establish requirements. Heer selected and organized the NASA Study Group on Machine Intelligence and Robotics.

While project manager for autonomous systems and space mechanics at NASA in 1979, he was executive secretary of a NASA study group including Carl Sagan as chairman, James S. Albus, Robert Balzer, Thomas Binford, Ralph C. Gonzales, Peter Hart, John Hill, Gentry Lee, Elliott C. Levinthal, Jack Minker, Marvin Minsky, Donald A Norman, Raj Reddy, Charles J. Rieger, Thomas B. Sheridan, William M. Whitney, Patrick Winston, and Steven Yerazunis. Heer edited and published the findings and recommendations of the Study Group as the NASA/JPL Report No. 715-32.

Ewald Heer was a robotics specialist at NASA's Jet Propulsion Laboratory in Pasadena, California. Interviewed in an Omni (magazine) article he called self-replicating robots "one of the most fascinating ideas for the future of space" and said: "This offers a way to create a self-supporting economy by robot labor... Immigrants from Earth could set out, knowing that the means of their survival had already been provided."

In a 1980 article on "Telepresence", Marvin Minsky recommended Heer's Remotely Manned Systems (Caltech, 1973) for more technical details on the subject.

== Academic work and professional affiliations ==
Ewald Heer was an adjunct professor of Industrial Engineering and Systems Engineering (1973–1984) and Founder and Director of the Institute of Techno-Economic Studies (1978–1984) at the University of Southern California. He was invited and contributed to The Book of Predictions (1980). He was a Distinguished Lecturer on Space Robotics of the American Institute of Aeronautics and Astronautics (1983–1984). He received from NASA six New Technology Awards and two Certificates of Recognition for “Creative Development of Technology”.

He was Vice Chairman and Chairman of the Computer Engineering Division of the American Society of Mechanical Engineers (1981 to 1983) and General Chairman of the Computers in Engineering Conference and Exhibit of the American Society of Mechanical Engineers (1984). He authored or coauthored more than one hundred technical publications including three books. He chaired two international conferences on remotely manned systems (at California Institute of Technology in 1972 and at USC in 1975) and organized the NASA study group on machine intelligence and robotics in 1977.

Heer also wrote on his family background in Chronicle of the Heer family, published in English and German (Cronik der familie Heer).

== Selected bibliography ==
=== Articles ===
- Earthquake analyses of high-rise buildings (1960)
- Dynamic analyses of large ground-based tracking antennas for the Bell Labs (1961)
- Underground wave propagation and their interaction with subterranean structures (1962)
- Analysis of the resistance potential against nuclear weapon explosions of the subway tunnels in Hamburg, Germany (1963)
- Step load moving with low subseismic velocity on the surface of a half-space of granular material (with Hans H. Bleich) April 1963 94 pages WEIDLINGER ASSOCIATES NEW YORK
- Buffeting atmospheric flow analysis of the Gemini spacecraft (1964)
- Development of the theory for an arbitrary number of systems with loose coupling subjected to determinate and random dynamic inputs (1967)
- Development of the Theory of Shell System with viscoelasticity and plastic material properties for Mars entry missions (1969)
- Maximum Dynamic Response and Proof Testing (with Jann-Nan Yang) Vol. 97, No. 4, July/August 1971, pp. 1307–1313 Journal of the Engineering Mechanics Division
- Remotely Manned Systems. Exploration and Operation in Space: Proceedings of the First National Conference Held at the California Institute of Technology, Pasadena, California September 13–15, 1972 published 1973
- Conceiving, developing and demonstrating with the cooperation of a patient with quadriplegia the first robotic voice controlled wheelchair for quadriplegics to the United States Congressional Committee for Science and Technology in Washington, D.C., chaired by Senator Ted Kennedy (1975).
- Ewald Heer, “Prospects for robotics in space,” Robotics Age vol. l(Winter 1979):20–28
- Nasa: Automated Decision Making and Problem Solving (Nasa Cp-2180) May 19–21, 1980 Proceedings of a conference held at NASA Langley Research Center (May 1921, 1980) 55 pages.
- Proceedings of the Pajaro Dunes Goal-Setting Workshop, unpublished draft notes, June 1980.
- “Robots in modern industry,” Astronautics and Aeronautics 19(September 1981):50–59
- Automated decision making and problem solving National Aeronautics and Space Administration, Scientific and Technical Information Branch (for sale by the National Technical Information Service) 1981
- Autonomous Mobile Robot Navigation and Learning co-author with Charles R. Weisbin, Gerard de Saussure, J. Ralph Einstein, and François G. Pin IEEE Computer 22(6): 29–35 (1989)
- Automation and Robotics for the Space Exploration Initiative: Results from Project Outreach - 1991

=== Books ===
- "Toward Intelligent Robot Systems in Aerospace" (with Henry Lum) American Institute of Aeronautics and Astronautics, Inc., 1988
- Machine Intelligence and Autonomy for Aerospace Systems (with Henry Lum) 1989 ISBN 978-0930403485, 355 pages American Institute of Aeronautics & Astronautics
- Operation systems, Humans-Intelligence-Machines 1998 HAI Publishers
- Machine Intelligence And Autonomy For Aerospace Systems (progress In Astronautics And Aeronautics) ISBN 0-930403-48-7
- Chronicle of the Heer family HRI Publishers, 1998
