= The Celestial Bed =

1987 novel by Irving Wallace

- First edition
- Author: Irving Wallace
- Language: English
- Published: Delacorte Press, 1987
- Publication place: United States
- Media type: Print

The Celestial Bed is a 1987 novel by Irving Wallace, revolving around scientific issues of sex. It is based on some of the sex therapy techniques developed after Masters and Johnson, who created the term "sex surrogates". It was first published in 1987 by Delacorte Press. The title refers to the "celestial bed" marketed by the 18th century sexologist James Graham.

One of the theories the book addresses is that certain individuals are ill-adjusted to normal sex, and that this can have grave consequences. The book states that these issues can be solved, but only with the help of sex surrogates. The patients must be taught practical sexual techniques by real people. The book also discusses whether sex technicians — the people who provide the hands on learning — are prostitutes.

The plot is structured according to the hero's journey technique.

The name of the book comes from a famous quack cure for impotence and sterility advocated by the "doctor" James Graham. (Both are a reference to a line in Act I, Scene 5 of Shakespeare's Hamlet.) The cover of the book features the famous painting La Grande Odalisque by Ingres.
