= Brian Dailey =

American artist

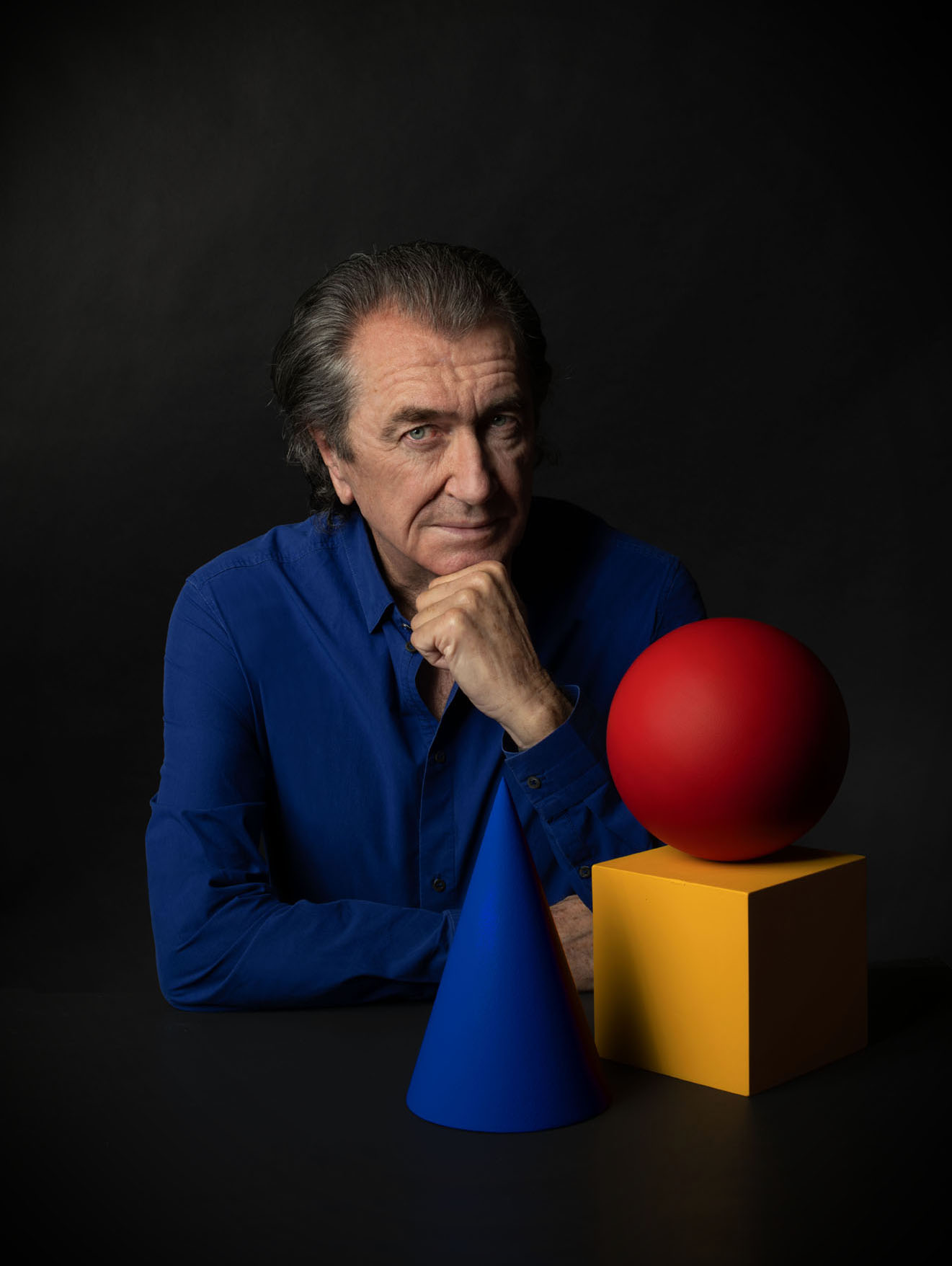
- Born: August 12, 1951; Pittsburg, California
- Education: Otis Art Institute MFA, 1975 University of Southern California PhD 1987
- Known for: artist, international security
- Movement: conceptualism, performance, eclecticism
- Website: briandaileyart.com

Brian Dailey (born August 12, 1951) is an American artist noted for his careers in both art and international relations. His work in a variety of mediums—including photography, film, installations, and painting—engages with the social, political, and cultural issues of our times and is not easily categorized. Dailey's art reflects his unconventional evolution as an artist and multifaceted life experiences, which include national level involvement in arms control, space policy, intelligence systems, and international security. He is based in the Washington DC metropolitan area and maintains studios in the District and Woodstock, Virginia.

== Personal life ==
Dailey was born in Pittsburg, California. His parents divorced when he was three, precipitating his mother's return to her native New Zealand with Dailey and his sister and the family's subsequent relocation to England. Dailey maintains dual American / New Zealand citizenship. The family returned to the United States in 1956 and resided in Santa Monica, California, where he spent his youth. He took up photography at the age of 12, beginning his formal photographic training after entering Pacific Palisades High School.

Dailey attended Ventura College where he developed an interest in ceramic sculpture, shifting the direction of his art career. On the basis of his portfolio, he was accepted directly into the Masters program at Otis Art Institute in Los Angeles where he became interested in performance, conceptual art, and video technology. In 1984 he married fellow artist Paula Ballo, who succumbed to cancer in 2016.

== Art career in Los Angeles ==
As a student at Otis Art Institute (MFA, 1975) and in his ensuing art career in Los Angeles, Dailey participated in the creative experimentation defining the artistic milieu in California in this era. In his installation works from this period, he explored the role of the artist in the causal process. His performance pieces placed an emphasis on active viewer engagement.

Upon graduation from Otis, Dailey began his art career exhibiting his performance and conceptual works in various institutions in Los Angeles and was represented by the Roger Wong Gallery. His work from this period includes painting, sculpture, and performance art, reflecting the pluralistic forms of creative expression and the political and social engagement generated by the Los Angeles artistic community.

Travel and exposure to diverse cultures had a significant impact on Dailey. During his art education, he traveled to Europe, visiting museums to study paintings and sculptures that inspired him as a student and visiting countries in the Eastern Bloc to learn about the communist political system. In 1976, Dailey set out to Japan with the aim of working with the director Akira Kurosawa, whose films were a source of inspiration. He traveled on the Trans Siberian Express to Japan, transiting through the Soviet Union. Meeting artists and writers in East Berlin and along the train stops in Siberia, he became increasingly interested in international relations and the issue of artistic freedom in totalitarian regimes.

Dailey's residence in Japan was brief. Discovering that Kurosawa's professional and private life was at a nadir and confronting the challenges of working in Japan, he returned to Los Angeles where he worked with Sam Francis in his Litho Shop and with a number of other leading artists in his capacity as an assistant at ACE Gallery in Venice, California. He also worked for the architect James De Long, a student of Frank Lloyd Wright. His growing interest in film and video led to his working as a grip at the American Film Institute in Los Angeles, where he learned filmmaking. Having worked on AFI projects he began to work on his own films using a 16mm Beaulieu camera.

== Arms control and international security ==
In 1981, Dailey's interest in international affairs and the Cold War led him to pursue a doctorate and a career in international relations. He studied arms control, Russian studies, and diplomatic history at the University of Southern California, receiving his degree in 1987 with a dissertation on the Anti-Ballistic Missile Treaty.

Dailey's career in international affairs began in 1984 with an internship as assistant director for chemical warfare negotiations in the Pentagon. In January 1985, he became an adjunct professor of National Security Affairs at the Naval Postgraduate School, Monterey, California. In this capacity, he managed a three-year Soviet deception project for the Pentagon's Director of Net Assessment and the U.S. Army as well as teaching courses on modern revolution and terrorism, nuclear targeting, strategic deception, and intelligence systems and products. In 1987, he co-edited and published the anthology Soviet Strategic Deception.

In January 1988, Dailey became a professional staff member of the Senate Armed Service Committee, assigned to the Subcommittee on Strategic Forces and Nuclear Deterrence. He was responsible for matters on arms control, missile defense, special access programs, as well as space and intelligence systems. In that capacity, he was also the minority staff liaison to Senate Select Committee on Intelligence. In 1992, he was appointed Executive Secretary of the National Space Council in the White House, where he was responsible for coordinating U.S. space policy for civil, commercial, defense, and intelligence issues.

At the end of the Cold War, Dailey transitioned to the private sector. He left the White House in 1993 to work for the Lockheed Corporation, where he was responsible for commercial programs including their joint ventures in the former Soviet Union. He went on to become a Senior Vice President and Corporate Officer of Lockheed Martin. In the course of his work in art, government, and the private sector, he traveled to over 140 countries on all continents more than 50 times to the Soviet Union and Russia.

== Return to art ==
Dailey returned to art full-time in 2008, leveraging his experiences in the intervening decades in his creative practice. His approach to art is both conceptual and performance based, inviting the viewer's participation. In his frequent use of the photographic tableau vivant, Dailey explores topical existential questions and utilizes composite imagery as a vehicle for making critical commentary on contemporary social and political issues. These staged "living pictures" have been featured in exhibitions in Europe and the United States (see selected exhibitions below).

Dailey's early interest in film resurfaces in his current practice. His video Jikai (2012) alludes to Shakespeare's The Merchant of Venice, employing a moth fatally drawn to light. Dedicated to Kurosawa, the video is a meditation on political disintegration. Jikai was screened on multiple synchronized monitors in New York City in February 2014 as the featured video in the Times Square Midnight Moment series.

Dailey has had solo exhibitions in Los Angeles, New York, and Bulgaria and participated in a number of group shows in the United States, Europe, and Russia. His mid-career retrospective, Declassified: Unraveling a Paradox, took place at Bulgaria's National Art Gallery in Sofia in 2014. Dailey was a featured speaker at FotoDC 2015, presenting his American in Color project as part of a series of talks on photobooks.

Dailey's encrypted Riddle series was featured in the exhibition GEOMETRIX: Line, Form, Subversion, organized by Curator's Office at three-venues in Washington, DC from January 14 to April 16, 2016. Lamentations, a meditation in two and three dimensions on nuclear theology and its implications in our atomic age, was featured in an interview with the artist in the Johns Hopkin's Journal of the Association for the Study of Arts of the Present. Three works from the Lamentations series were included in Absence and Presence: Arts in Foggy Bottom Outdoor Sculpture Biennial 2018, Washington DC and the associated exhibition at the Watergate Gallery. Dailey's Words series, an international exploration of the role of language in the construction of cultural identity in the global age, premiered in January 2018 at the Katzen Art Center at American University in Washington D.C. His inaugural solo exhibition at the Baahng Gallery, Polytropos, took place from November 1 to December 15, 2018.

== Publications ==
- America in Color (OSMOS: New York, 2014). Distributed by Artbook DAP
- WORDS, Exhibition brochure, Essays by Klaus Ottmann and Wendy A. Grossman, Katzen Art Center, American University Museum, 2018
- 14 Stations at the Crossroads, Limited-edition Artist's Book (January 2020)
