= Day & Night (2010 film) =

2010 American film

- Promotional release poster
- Directed by: Teddy Newton
- Written by: Teddy Newton
- Produced by: Kevin Reher
- Starring: Wayne Dyer
- Edited by: Greg Snyder
- Music by: Michael Giacchino
- Production company: Pixar Animation Studios
- Distributed by: Walt Disney Studios; Motion Pictures (Note: Distributed by Walt Disney Studios Motion Pictures through the Walt Disney Pictures banner.)
- Release date: June 18, 2010 (with Toy Story 3)
- Running time: 6 minutes
- Country: United States

Day & Night is a 2010 American animated short film written and directed by Teddy Newton and produced by Pixar. It was shown in theaters before Toy Story 3, and has been released to purchase on iTunes in the United States. Unlike most other Pixar shorts, the animation style combines 2D and 3D elements, and Up production designer Don Shank says it is "unlike anything Pixar has produced before".

== Plot ==
Day & Night follows two characters, Day and Night. Inside Day is a day scene with a sun in the center, and inside Night is a night scene with a moon in the center. Whatever goes on inside of Day or Night expresses normal events that typically occur within a day or night, respectively, and these events often correspond with actions or emotions that Day or Night express or receive. For example, when Day is happy he will have a rainbow inside him, and when Night is happy he will have fireworks inside him.

At first, Day and Night meet and are uneasy about each other. They are dismissive of each other because each perceives the other as being different, and their prejudices result in a physical altercation between the two. However, as the characters discover the many fascinating events that occur in each other such as pool parties or late night drive-in movies, they learn to appreciate them and learn to like one another and enjoy the differences of the respective times they represent. At the end of the film, the Sun descends in Day and rises in Night, so that when the Sun is at the same height above the horizon in each, both characters appear to be identical. As the Sun continues its course, Day becomes Night, and Night becomes Day.

== Production ==
The short uses a novel effect of combining 2D and 3D animation. The outlines of both characters are hand drawn and animated in 2-D, while the scenes inside their silhouettes are rendered in 3D; the use of a masking technique allows the 2D characters to be windows into a 3D world inside them. The Day & Night is Pixar's second short film to be partially animated in 2D, after Your Friend the Rat.

The voice used in the short is from Dr. Wayne Dyer and was taken from a lecture he gave in the 1970s. The director of the movie incorporated the ideas taken from Dyer's lecture to show that the unknown can be mysterious and beautiful, and need not be something to fear, which is echoed by a similar speech by Albert Einstein, who said, "The most beautiful thing we can experience is the mysterious". Pixar honored Dyer by providing him with a private screening of the film.

Fear of the unknown. They are afraid of new ideas. They are loaded with prejudices, not based upon anything in reality, but based on "if something is new, I reject it immediately because it's frightening to me". What they do instead is just stay with the familiar. You know, to me, the most beautiful things in all the universe are the most mysterious.

The score was created by composer Michael Giacchino.

== Reception ==
=== Critical reception ===
The short has been critically acclaimed. The Wall Street Journal described Day & Night as a "sensationally original short", and said it "looks like nothing you've ever seen, and plays like a dream of glories to come". Antagony & Ecstasy gave the film 10/10, writing "Newton's ability to finesse a remarkably difficult conceptual hook into a supremely easy cartoon is proof enough that he has storytelling skills much the equal of anybody working at Pixar. Yet this is also, possibly, the least of the film's achievements: it is technically, formally, and thematically a work of great accomplishment, and merely being able to tell a weird story coherently is just cake at that point".

The Projection Booth rated the film 4.5 out of 5, writing "Still superior [to the feature film Toy Story 3] is the preceding short Day & Night (directed by Teddy Newton), a morally and politically charged look at our perception of reality (and each other) and easily the best of Pixar's shorts to date". Cinema Crazed said the short is "ultimately very evocative of the classic Warner and MGM animated experiments that appealed to all audiences and didn’t talk down to its respective theater going crowd". NOLA.com described it as an "artful snatch of 3-D whimsy".

=== Awards and nominations ===
Significantly, Day & Night was nominated for the Best Animated Short Film (at the 83rd Annual Academy Awards). It won the award for Best Short Film at the 38th Annie Awards.

The Visual Effects Society also gave Day & Night an award for the Outstanding Achievement in an Animated Short.

== See also ==
- La Luna (2011 film)
