= The Second Lady =

1980 novel by Irving Wallace

- First edition
- Author: Irving Wallace
- Genre: Political thriller
- Publisher: New American Library
- Publication date: 1980
- Pages: 372
- ISBN: 0-453-00388-5
- OCLC: 6379182
- Dewey Decimal: 813/.54
- LC Class: PS3573.A426 S4

The Second Lady is a political thriller by Irving Wallace.

== Commercial Reception ==
The Second Lady was a New York Times bestseller; it was on the list for nine weeks, peaking at #8.

== Film Adaptation ==
The novel was adapted into a Hindi feature film, Sharara (1984), starring Hema Malini.
