= The People's Almanac =

Series of books by David Wallechinsky and Irving Wallace

First edition (publ. Doubleday)

The People's Almanac is a series of four books compiled in 1975, 1978, 1981 and 1995 by David Wallechinsky and his father Irving Wallace. The fourth edition was The People's Almanac Presents The 20th Century. It followed the same format as the previous three volumes but covered one century and was written by Wallechinsky alone (his father having died in 1990).

In 1973, Wallechinsky became fed up with almanacs that regurgitated bare facts. He had the idea for a reference book to be read for pleasure; a book that would tell the often untold true tales of history. He worked alone for 12 months before being joined by his father for a further year of research. The People's Almanac was published by Doubleday in 1975, and became a best-seller. Its success led to The People's Almanac #2 in 1978 and The People's Almanac #3 in 1981, both published by William Morrow and Company. The People's Almanac Presents The 20th Century was published by Little, Brown, and a later version was published with a slightly different title, The People's Almanac Presents The 20th Century: History With The Boring Parts Left Out.

One of the most popular chapters was a selection of lists, which spawned The Book of Lists. The People's Almanac books depart from conventional almanacs (such as the World Almanac) by including many entertaining facts, lists and esoteric knowledge. Special sections include ones on natural and man-made disasters, "Footnote People in World History," biographies of fictional characters (such as Superman), past predictions by psychics—both correct and incorrect, and predictions for the years 1975 and on. Odd and unexplained happenings (such as the Devil's Footprints) are also discussed, though authoritative references are generally not given.
