= Michael Trope =

Michael L Trope
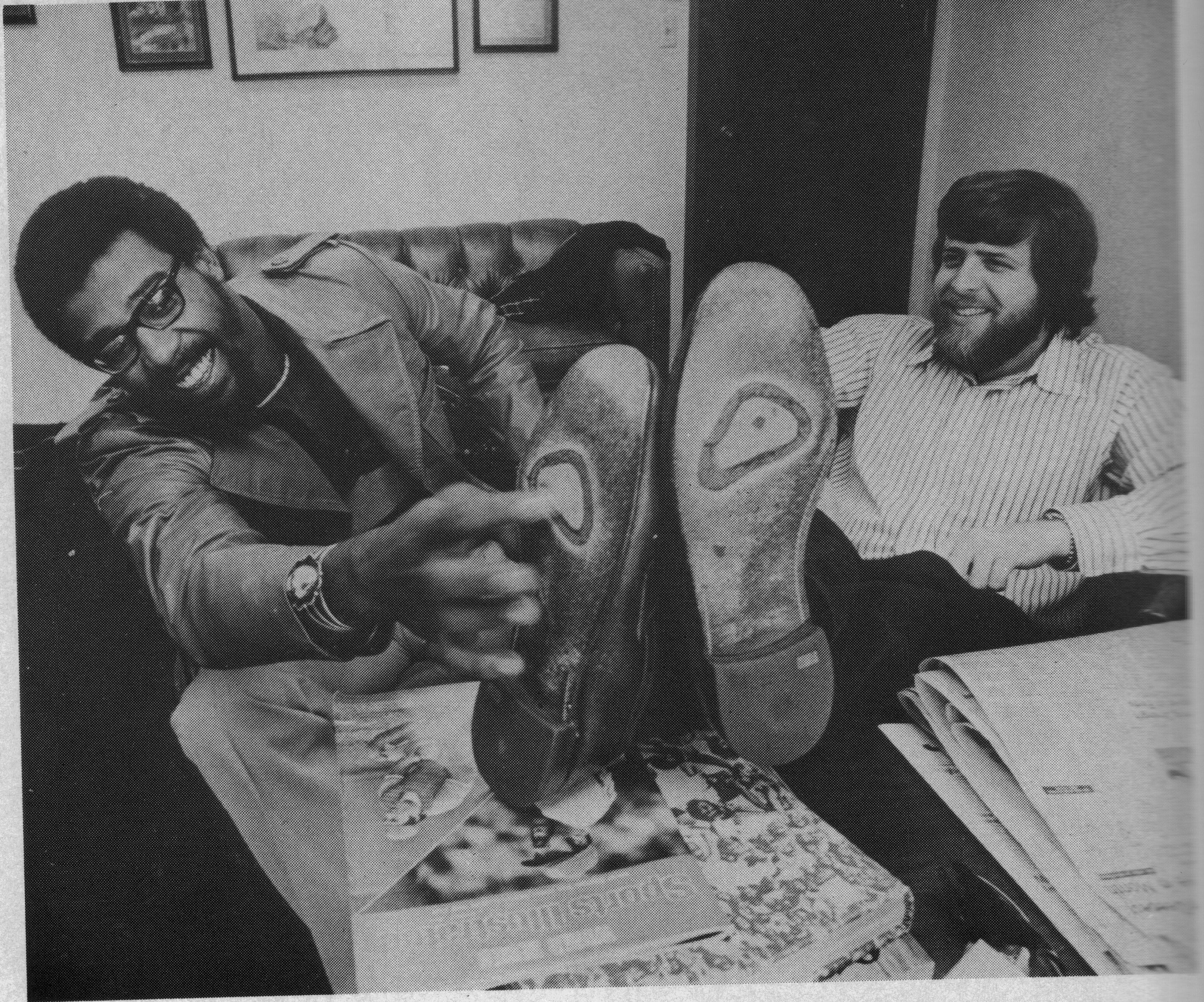
- Trope (right) and Chuck Muncie in 1976
- Born: Michael Lance Trope; December 24, 1951 (age 74); Los Angeles, California, U.S.
- Occupation: Trial Lawyer 1987 to Present Former Sports Agent (1972-1985)
- Parent(s): Sorrell Trope, Gloria Trope
- Website: michaeltrope.law

Michael Lance "Mike" Trope (born 1951), is a Los Angeles based trial lawyer and former sports agent for over 200 NFL players. Trope was a sports agent from the time he was a 21-year-old senior at the University of Southern California (USC) in 1972 until he retired from the business in 1985. Subsequently, after Trope's graduation from Loyola Law School, he was admitted to practice law in California in 1987. As an agent for football stars, Trope was known for negotiating record breaking contracts in the 1970s, including the first million dollar package for an NFL rookie. This caused many publications to refer to Trope, still in his 20s, as a Super Agent by 1977, as well as "Whiz Kid" and "LA's Boy Wonder". Trope is the son of legendary Los Angeles Trial lawyer and philanthropist, Sorrell Trope.

== Biography ==
=== Early years ===
Trope graduated from Palisades Charter High School in 1969 and graduated magna cum laude from USC with a major in history in 1973. Trope later graduated from Loyola Law School in 1983 and was admitted to the California State Bar in 1987.

== Professional life ==
In 1971, 20-year-old USC junior, Trope, decided he wanted to be an agent after watching Johnny Rodgers's 72-yard punt return touchdown against Oklahoma, leading Nebraska to the national championship. Rodgers won the Heisman Trophy and Trope, at age 21 signed Rodgers as his first client and became the youngest agent in history to represent NFL players.

After graduating from Loyola Law School in 1983 Trope retired as an NFL agent in 1985. Trope was admitted to the California State Bar in 1987, which is also the year Trope wrote the book "Necessary Roughness", a very candid and blunt book about life as an NFL agent.

=== Sports Agent ===
Johnny Rodgers was the 1972 winner of the Heisman Trophy and Trope, in 1973 at age 21 became the youngest agent in history to represent NFL players.

Over the next 12 years, between 1973 and 1985, Trope represented more NFL first round draft picks than any other agent, including six Heisman Trophy winners; numerous collegiate all Americans and over 200 total contracts.

During Trope's career as a sports agent, Trope's client list included, in addition to 1972 Heisman Winner Johnny Rodgers who went first to the Canadian Football League Montreal Alouettes and later to the San Diego Chargers; 1974 and 1975 Heisman winner Archie Griffin Cincinnati Bengals' first round draft pick; the 1977 Heisman winner Tony Dorsett Dallas Cowboys first round draft pick; 1978 Heisman winner and number one over all NFL draft pick Earl Campbell Houston Oilers; 1980 Heisman winner and first round draft pick Charles White (American football) Cleveland Browns; 1983 Heisman winner and first overall draft pick in the United States Football League Mike Rozier Pittsburgh Maulers; Heisman Trophy runner up Chuck Muncie, first round draft pick to New Orleans Saints; Ricky Bell first overall NFL draft pick, Tampa Bay Buccaneers; Marvin Powell first round draft pick New York Jets; Lawrence Taylor, first round draft pick New York Giants; W. Clay Matthews, Jr., first round draft pick Cleveland Browns; Wes Chandler, first round draft pick New Orleans Saints; Anthony Muñoz, first round draft pick Cincinnati Bengals; Russell Erxleben, first round draft pick New Orleans Saints.; Lindsey Scott first round draft pick Atlanta Falcons; James Lofton, first round draft pick Green Bay packers; Chris Ward, first round draft pick New York Jets; Al Harris, first round draft pick Chicago Bears; Charles Alexander first round draft pick Cincinnati Bengals; Dave Wilson supplemental first round draft pick New Orleans Saints; Warren Bryant first round draft pick Atlanta Falcons; Mike Quick first round draft pick Philadelphia Eagles; Johnie Cooks first round draft pick Baltimore Colts; Kellen Winslow first round draft pick San Diego Chargers; Kevin Brooks first round draft pick Dallas Cowboys; Johnny "Lam" Jones first round draft pick New York Jets; Mike Kenn first round draft pick Atlanta Falcons; Ricky Sanford first round draft pick New England Patriots; Dennis Smith first round draft pick Denver Broncos and many other notable players.

Lawrence Taylor signed a secret deal with Donald Trump and the USFL's New Jersey Generals, which he later regretted. He asked Trope to attempt to extricate himself from the deal. Trope met with General's owner Donald Trump and the owners of the New York Giants and negotiated [a] a release for Taylor from the General's contract; and [b] a new $6 million multi-year deal for Taylor with the Giants. The negotiated deal resulted in Taylor's receiving a new $6 million plus deal with the Giants, and with Trump receiving full repayment of the $1 million interest-free loan he made to Taylor, plus a handsome profit.

=== Trial Lawyer ===
Trope graduated from Loyola Law School and was admitted to the California State Bar in 1987.

Trope, as a lawyer, has represented clients in jury and non-jury trials in various matters including criminal, probate, breach of contract, wrongful death, and family law matters.

In 1988 Trope represented sports agent Lloyd Bloom in an indictment filed in federal Court, In 1997 Trope represented Major League Soccer players Paul Caligiuri

In 2007 Trope Represented Larry Birkhead in a suit against Birkhead's former lawyer, and Pamela Bach in her divorce and custody case.

In 2010 Trope obtained the largest recorded child support order, for one child, in the United States for client, Lisa Kerkorian, ex-wife of Las Vegas hotel magnate Kirk Kerkorian, which included a $10 million lump-sum payment of retroactive child support, along with future child support payments of $100,000 per month.

In 2013 Trope successfully defended Randall Douthit, in a domestic abuse jury trial in which Douthit's former wife, Patric Jones, sued him for $3 million in damages plus punitive damages. On September 27, 2013 Trope obtained a jury verdict in favor of Douthit finding no liability and vindicating Douthit as to all claims. In 2015 the California Appeals Court upheld the win with Appeal B254719

== Books and Media ==
Trope has authored two books;

- Necessary Roughness. Raleigh, NC: Contemporary Books. August 1987. ISBN 9780809248162.
- Once Upon a Time in Los Angeles: The Trials of Earl Rogers. Glendale, CA: The Arthur H. Clark Company. July 25, 2001. ISBN 978-0870623059.
