= The Word (novel) =

1972 novel by Irving Wallace

- First edition cover.
- Author: Irving Wallace
- Language: English
- Genre: Mystery
- Publisher: Simon & Schuster
- Publication date: March 27, 1972
- Publication place: United States
- Media type: Print (hardback & paperback)
- Pages: 576 (first edition)
- ISBN: 0-6712-1153-6

The Word is a 1972 mystery thriller novel by American writer Irving Wallace, which explores the origin of the New Testament of the Bible.

== Plot ==
The plot of the novel is based around the discovery within Roman ruins of a new gospel written by Jesus' younger brother, James in the first century. In the gospel, many facts of Jesus' life, including the years not mentioned in the Bible, are revealed not to be as factual as they were once thought to be. Steven Randall, a divorced public relations executive running his own company in New York City, is the man hired by New Testament International, an alliance of American and European Bible publishers, to give publicity to James' Gospel as published by them. The project has been top-secret for six years, and now it is about to be unveiled to a world long in need of Christian revival. However, as Steven gets more involved in the project he runs into several questionable circumstances, as radical clerics centered in Central Europe oppose the publication of the document, since it would give ammunition for the conservative churches to keep the flow of worship from the top to the bottom, instead of bringing the faith to the masses. A struggle for control of the World Council of Churches, the suspicious absence in the project of archeologist Prof. Augusto Monti, the original discoverer – and whose daughter Angela is a potential love interest for Steve – and the potential notion that the newly discovered gospel itself is a forgery made in the 20th century instead of a legitimate historical document, all are guaranteed to make Steve question the worth of the new job he is undertaking, and the newly re-found faith in God he acquired along with it.

=== Locales ===
- New York City, Steve's place of work and regular abode.
- Oak City, Wisconsin, Steve's hometown (fictional; may be based on Oak Creek and/or Pleasant Prairie).
- London, England, where Steve meets Dr. Bernard Jeffries and Dr. Florian Knight
- Amsterdam, Netherlands, headquarters of the New Testament International project, and of Maertin de Vroome's Westerkerk.
- Paris, France, home of Henri Aubert's lab at the Centre national de la recherche scientifique
- Mainz, Germany home of Karl Hennig's printing press
- Simonopetra Monastery, Mount Athos, Greece
- Rome, Italy, base of the Monti family, and its former Roman seaport Ostia Antica, place of the discovery of the Gospel According to James
- Milan, Italy, where Steve first meets Angela

== Topics ==
Wallace touches on several topics related to the origin of the Bible, and current issues of Christianity, while writing the book:

- Histories of several real-life discoveries, such as the Dead Sea Scrolls, the Codex Sinaiticus and the Apocryphal Gospel of Peter, their publications and exhibitions.
- The struggle between Christianity's conservatives, who want to keep control of the existing churches by emphasizing hierarchies, and the liberals/radicals, who want to bring Christianity to the masses by loosening control and humanizing the message of the gospel.
- The struggle for Christian ecumenism to occur in light of the conservative/liberal struggle mentioned above.
- Radiocarbon dating, translation of ancient languages, proofreading, editing and printing – important processes in the making of a Bible. The compilation of the King James Version of the Bible is also touched upon.
- The character of Maertin de Vroome, a fictional leader in the Dutch Reformed Church and leader of the radicals, cites Rudolf Bultmann and Paul Tillich as major influences in his thought and personal opposition to the new Bible project.

== Reception ==
The Word was a New York Times best seller. It spent 31 weeks on the list, two of which were at #1.

== TV miniseries ==
The book was made into an eight-hour miniseries (4 episodes - 2 hr. each) that aired on CBS Nov 12th, 13th, 14th, and 15th, 1978. It starred David Janssen as Steven, Kate Mulgrew as Steven's first lover Darlene (renamed Tony in the TV version), Florinda Bolkan as Angela, James Whitmore as George Wheeler, Eddie Albert as Ogden Towery, Geraldine Chaplin as Naomi Dunn, Hurd Hatfield as Cedric Plummer, John Huston as Nathan Randall, John McEnery as Florian Knight, Ron Moody as LeBrun, Diana Muldaur as Claire Randall, Janice Rule as Barbara Randall, Martha Scott as Sarah Randall, Nicol Williamson as Maertin de Vroome, and Mario Scaccia as Prof. Monti. Tessie O'Shea, a British singer who does not appear in the book, makes a cameo as herself. A cut, 3 hour version was released on VHS in 1996. The entire miniseries has never been released on home video in any form.
