= The Book of Predictions =

Book by David Wallechinsky

- First edition
- Author: David Wallechinsky, Amy Wallace, Irving Wallace
- Language: English
- Genre: Reference
- Publisher: William Morrow & Company
- Publication date: 1981
- Publication place: United States
- Pages: 452
- ISBN: 0-688-00024-X
- LC Class: 303.4

The Book of Predictions was a book published in 1981 and written by David Wallechinsky, Amy Wallace, and Irving Wallace, the authors of The Book of Lists. Written in the same type of style (i.e., lists), it includes lists of predictions by scientists, science fiction authors, politicians, and others. Other contents include:

- "18 Greatest Predictors of All Time" including the Great Pyramid of Cheops, Mother Shipton, Nostradamus, and Edgar Cayce.
- "The 6 Greatest Predictions of All Time": The Ides of March, St. Malachy's predictions of future popes, a prediction of the Titanic's sinking, and Jeane Dixon's prediction of the Assassination of John F. Kennedy.
- "The Worst Predictions of All Time", ranging from "legitimate" failures (the British Parliament stating the incandescent light would never work) to psychic fails (Muhammad Ali would be elected to Congress in a non-election year).
- The Book of Predictions Contest. The winners receive a housekeeping robot (if available) or personal appointments with famous psychics. Winners were chosen in 1982.
