= The Seventh Secret =

Alternate history novel by Irving Wallace

- First edition cover
- Author: Irving Wallace
- Publisher: E. P. Dutton
- Publication date: January 15, 1985

The Seventh Secret is a 1985 novel by American writer Irving Wallace using an alternate history of Adolf Hitler having survived World War II.

== Plot summary ==
Oxford historian Harrison Ashcroft, preparing to publish his biography of Adolf Hitler entitled Herr Hitler along with his daughter Emily Ashcroft, receives a letter from a stranger in West Berlin informing them that the book could be wrong if published with the popular version of Hitler's suicide as its end. The stranger even writes that he can prove that the corpses shown in the April 30, 1945 photos of Führerbunker were not of Hitler and his wife Eva Braun.

Intrigued by this information, Harrison Ashcroft travels to West Berlin. Soon after a short meeting with the informant, Harrison Ashcroft calls a press conference and reveals that he doubts Hitler would have escaped the war and would be hiding under a false name. He announces his intention to excavate the graves of Hitler and Eva on the Soviet side of Berlin. Only seconds after this press conference, he is killed in a freak truck accident which is witnessed by a press reporter. This press reporter writes to Emily Ashcroft telling her that it was murder not an accident.

With the intention of finding why her father was killed, Emily comes to West Berlin and starts investigating and is joined by three other people coming with their own reasons to resolve the mystery of Hitler's death. These are American architect Rex Foster, Soviet museum curator Neil Kirvov, and Jerusalem Post reporter Tovah Levine. Rex plans to publish a book of surviving Third Reich buildings and he is missing the seven mystery buildings built during the final days of the war in Germany. Neil Kirvov is a would-be collector of Hitler's art and possesses a valid Hitler oil painting which he wants to display in his museum's exhibition. He wants someone to validate the painting as Hitler's and also to find the provenance of the painting. Tovah is in fact a Mossad agent searching for surviving Nazis.

Emily Ashcroft, Kirvov, Foster and Levine combine their efforts and reach an incredible discovery. Kirvov finds a painting that is supposed to be an authentic painting by Hitler, and concludes that the real Adolf Hitler might still be alive. The painting depicting a Nazi building shows the image of a renovation dated from 1952. How could this supposedly authentic Hitler painting show the building as it was seven years after his supposed death?

Levine helps the four of them by discovering that Hitler and Eva Braun used body doubles to attend functions in their place and who resembled them very closely. Could the Hitler and Eva doubles have been the ones who really died in the bunker? But Levine disappears from the Cafe Wolf, which had originally been Eva Braun's photo studio.

Rex discovers through a former Nazi bunker architect that Hitler had seven bunkers, though only six were known. He discovers that the seventh bunker adjoins the bunker in which Hitler supposedly died. He searches for a secret passage that leads from the Hitler bedroom to a seventh bunker in a hidden passage previously built by Jewish slaves (who were later killed by Hitler). As Foster finds and goes through the secret passage to the seventh bunker where Emily Ashcroft is held captive; the bunker is located directly beneath the Cafe Wolf. Eva Braun is still alive and sleeping in the adjacent room. Rex asks Emily to escape, and he later drugs Eva (who is living under the name Evelyn Hoffman) with a truth drug. Braun admits that she and Hitler used their doubles at the time of their claimed death, and had been living in this bunker, escaping the Soviet Red Army after they raided the bunker complex. Eva stated the real Hitler died in 1963, and since that time she had been leading the over fifty Nazis left in the secret bunker and that they would rise once again. This would take place when the Nazis were strong enough and after the Americans and Soviets destroyed each other.

Eva Braun also revealed the secret that she and Hitler had a child before he died. Hitler did not want his daughter to rot in the bunker, so he bribed their previous maid to take care of the daughter as her own. The daughter's name was Klara Feigbig; she was already married and is pregnant with Hitler's grandchild, but she has no idea about her actual parentage and lives a peaceful life. Eva also reveals that the police chief, Wolfgang Schmidt, who appeared to be a trusted anti-Nazi was actually one of Hitler's secret SS guards and was to take over as leader when Nazi Germany was reestablished.

After these revelations, Foster goes to Levine, who relays them to her superior, Chaim Goldman. He orders his subordinates to poison the bunker with Zyklon-B (the gas used by the Nazis to kill inmates of the concentration camps), killing Schmidt and the remaining Nazis. Eva Braun escapes to daughter Klara's flat and reveals the truth to her, who poisons herself with cyanide rather than run away with her mother.
