= Alex Alben =

American technology executive and academic

- Alben in 2004
- Born: New York City, United States
- Occupations: Technology executive, author, law professor

Alex Alben, American technology executive, author and law professor, worked as the first Chief Privacy Officer of Washington State from April 2015 to May 2019. His career spans work for innovative Internet media companies with influential positions in industry groups seeking to create new laws for digital distribution of content. Previously, he was a candidate for the United States House of Representatives in 2004, a campaign which drew national attention because of the high tech district and the media personalities involved in the race, as noted by media coverage in The New York Times, "In a House Campaign With Personality, One Candidate Has the Microphone," June 12, 2004. He ran as a Democrat in the Eighth Congressional District of Washington. Alben is the author of "Analog Days—How Technology Rewrote Our Future," and consults to public sector organizations, high tech and energy companies on privacy and security related matters. He is a lecturer at the UCLA School of Law, teaching courses on digital privacy and cybersecurity. The focus of his current research is artificial intelligence, antitrust law, and speech regulation on social media platforms.

== Early life ==
Alben was born in New York City. Alben is the son of advertising executive Russ Alben and grand nephew of World War I hero, Bud Alben, for whom Alben Square in Brooklyn is named. He attended Hunter College Elementary School and graduated from Palisades High School.

== Career ==
After graduating Stanford University in 1980, Alben began his career working for CBS News in New York as a research assistant to anchorman Walter Cronkite. He covered the 1980 Presidential campaign and the first Ronald Reagan inauguration. In 1981, Alben worked on the controversial CBS Reports Documentary, "The Uncounted Enemy, A Vietnam Deception," which sparked a $100 million libel suit between General William C. Westmoreland and CBS News. The suit settled in 1985, with no payment, but a statement from CBS that Westmoreland "had done his duty as he saw fit." By this time, Alben had left CBS for Stanford Law School, where he graduated in 1984. Alben's work at CBS and on "The Uncounted Enemy" documentary are cited in the Sam Adams biography, "Who The Hell Are We Fighting?" C. Michael Haim, Steerforth Press, 2006. Adams's book, "War of Numbers," posthumously published in 1994, was the basis for the documentary.

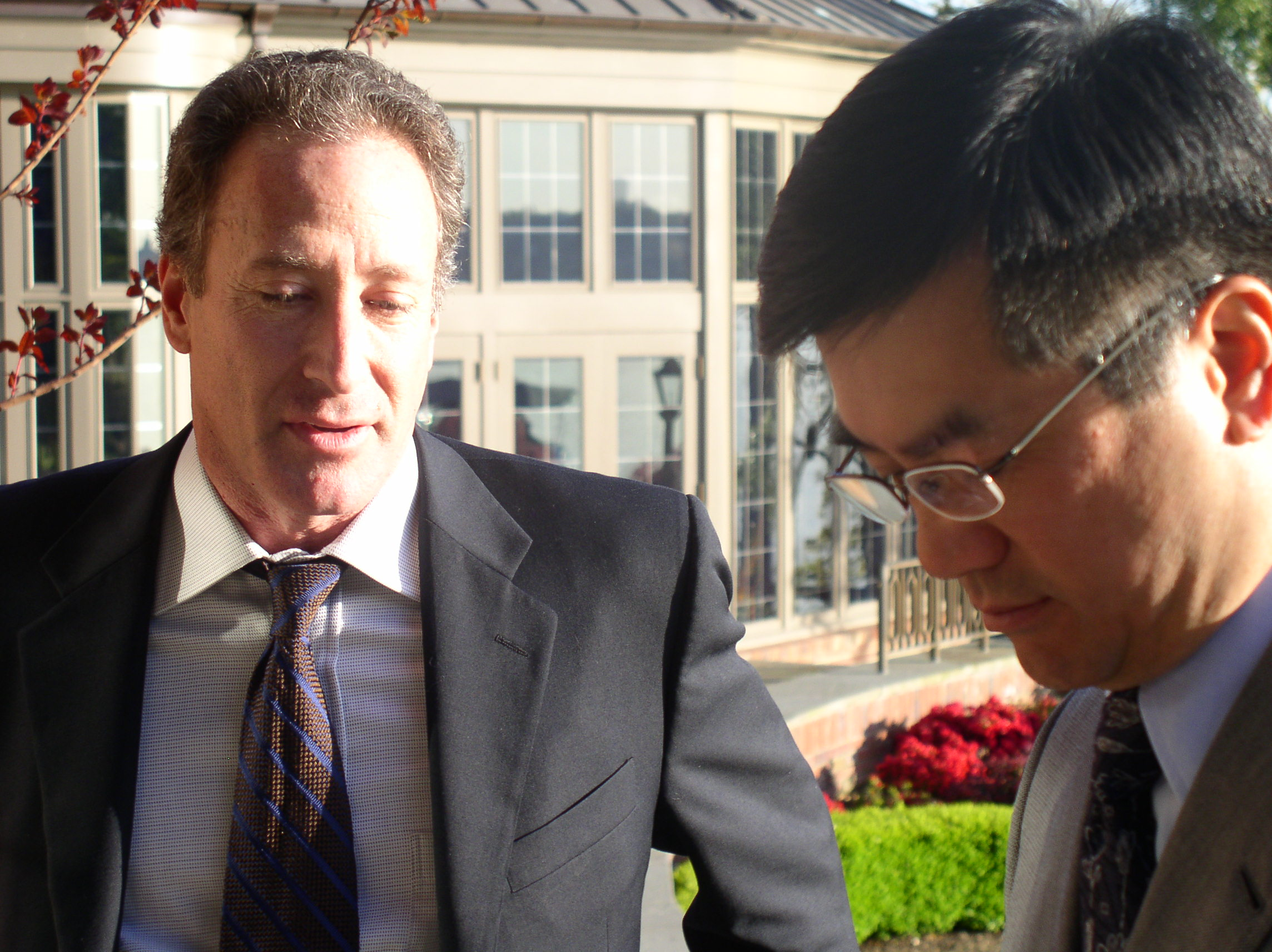
Alex Alben and Gary Locke in 2004

Alben participated in Stanford University's undergraduate program in Arms Control in 1980 (A.B.) and received a J.D. from Stanford Law School in 1984. He worked for Senator Claiborne Pell, Democrat of Rhode Island, on the Foreign Relations Committee and Senator John Culver, Democrat of Iowa, on the Armed Services Committee during the Senate's consideration of the SALT II treaty.

Alben began work in 1985 as an entertainment lawyer for the Beverly Hills, CA, firm of Rosenfeld, Meyer & Susman. He moved on to legal and business affairs for Orion Pictures and Warner Bros., before moving to the Seattle area in 1993.

Alben served as general counsel and the vice president of business affairs for Starwave Corporation and head of government affairs for RealNetworks. At Starwave, Alben worked on pioneering CD-ROM products and helped launch ABCNews.com and ESPN.com. As a RealNetworks Vice President, Alben worked on the "RealJukebox" music management project, which contributed to the proliferation of MP3 music files, both legally and illegally disseminated across the Internet. On behalf of the technology industry, Alben testified before the U.S. Copyright Office, Senate Judiciary Committee and House Commerce Committee on the digital distribution of music and the importance of creating authorized channels for the distribution of Internet Radio and music downloads. In testimony before the Senate in 2002 as Vice President of public policy for RealNetworks, Alben predicted that web video was evolving so rapidly that one day all television programs would be found on the Internet.

Along with record label and high tech executives, he participated in the founding of the Secure Digital Music Initiative and the Digital Media Association. Alben's work as an entertainment attorney and as counsel for Starwave are explored in the book, "Free Culture," by Lawrence Lessig, Penguin Press, 2004, which describes Starwave's efforts to license digital rights for products such as a CD-ROM based on the film career of Clint Eastwood.

Alben is the author of a comedy-spy novel, Our Man in Mongoa, published by Charles Scribner's Sons. Regarding Our Man in Mongoa, Publishers Weekly wrote: "Alben writes smoothly, with terrific pace and even better humor, which, deliciously deadpan, skewers even moving targets." From 2005 to 2013, he has written opinion pieces about politics and media for The New York Times, Seattle Times and Seattle Post-Intelligencer. His initial editorial about his experience running for Congress, "Real Candidates Have Curves," appeared in The New York Times, Opinion, September 27, 2004. Since 2009, he has written a guest editorial column on media, technology and politics for "The Seattle Times."

Alben's book, "Analog Days-- How Technology Rewrote Our Future" was published in 2012. Stanford Law Professor Paul Goldstein commented: "In his new book, Alex Alben provides a first-person account of working at two of the pioneer companies that laid the groundwork for the modern web. His lively narrative covers the creation of ESPN.com and Starwave’s first-of-a-kind web services at a time when we were still rooted in the world of old media." He was selected in 2012 for the speaker roster for Humanities Washington. Alben's book, "Eliezer's Train and Family Tales- Tales of the Alben and Winokoor Families in the Old and New Worlds," was published in 2022.

=== 2004 Congressional campaign ===
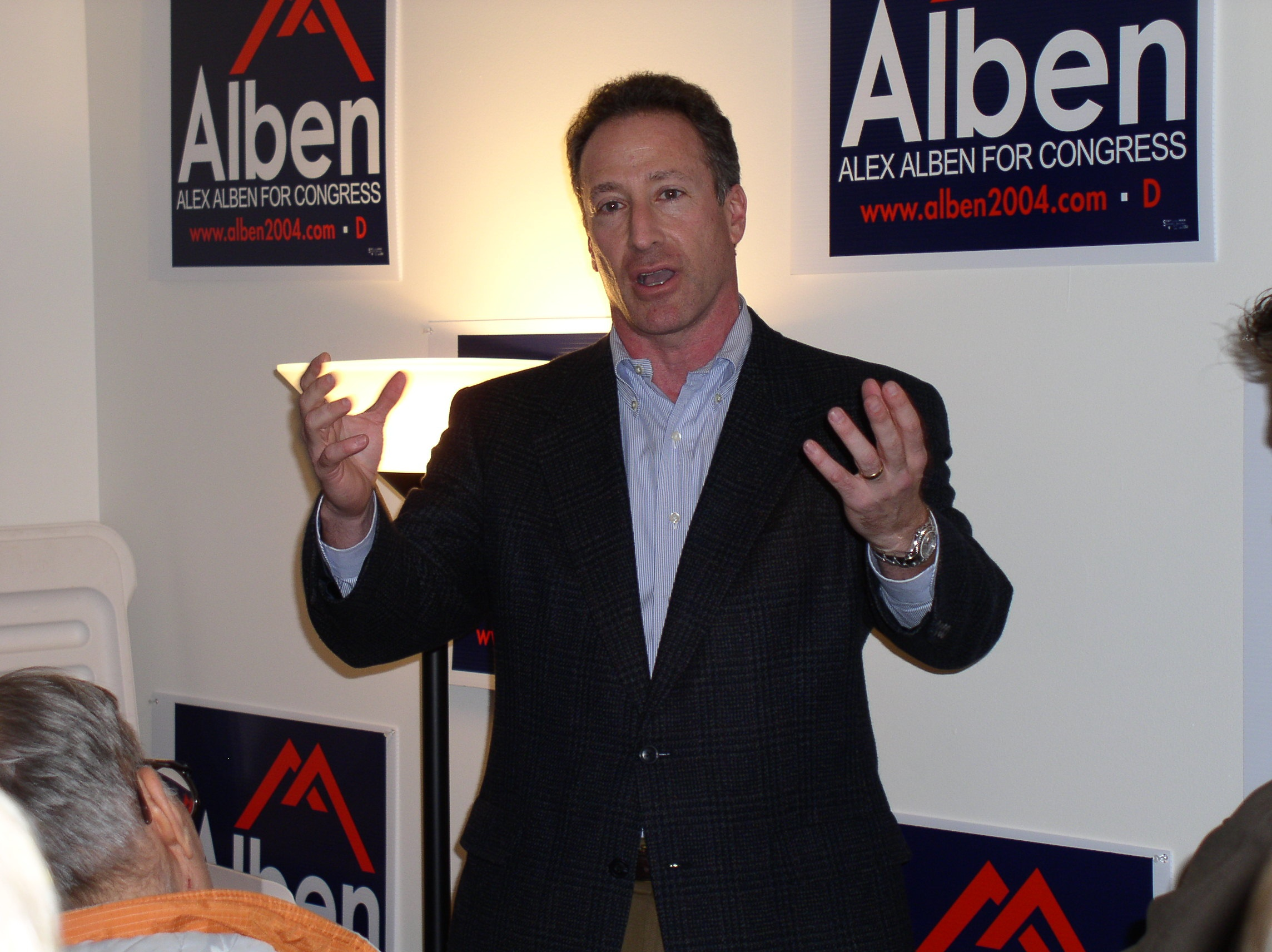
Alex Alben gives speech at Alben For Congress HQ, 2004

Alben ran a centrist campaign for retiring incumbent Republican Representative Jennifer Dunn. He emphasized his experience in the high-tech world and his active participation in the Digital Millennium Copyright Act and other issues affecting the software industry. Alben won the endorsement of The Seattle Times, the Seattle Post-Intelligencer and the King County Journal. The Seattle Times, September 12, 2004, "The Times Endorses . . ." "In The Northwest: Finding 8th District front-runner is no Dunn deal," By Joel Connelly, the Seattle Post-Intelligencer, August 23, 2004.

During the course of the campaign, Alben publicly criticized his political campaign, radio talk show host Dave Ross, for remaining on his daily radio program while actively fundraising and campaigning as a candidate. Alben claimed that Ross's activity violated federal campaign finance law, according to The New York Times, in an article published June 12, 2004.

Alben lost the Democratic primary to Ross.

=== Post-congressional career ===
Alben has worked as a guest columnist for The Seattle Times and as a contributor to other publications. He writes about issues as a result of new digital devices and applications. His most recent columns invoke nomophobia, the "digital afterlife," and the influence of social media on American politics.
