= Amy Wallace =

American writer (1955–2013)

- Born: Amy Deborah Wallace; July 3, 1955; Los Angeles, California, U.S.
- Died: August 10, 2013 (aged 58); Los Angeles, California, U.S.
- Occupation: Writer
- Spouse: Josef Marc
- Relatives: Irving Wallace and Sylvia Kahn (parents); David Wallechinsky (brother)
- Writing career
- Period: 1976–2013
- Notable works: The Book of Lists, Sorcerer's Apprentice: My Life with Carlos Castaneda

Amy Wallace (July 3, 1955 – August 10, 2013) was an American writer. She was the daughter of writers Irving Wallace and Sylvia Wallace and the sister of writer and populist historian David Wallechinsky. She was co-author of the bestselling book The Book of Lists (1977).

== Career ==
Wallace is best known for her books of lists, with topics that ranged from the rare, curious, and unusual to crime and horror. In 1977, she lived in Berkeley on her brother's commune. During school breaks, she worked with him and their father on what was to become a bestseller, The Book of Lists. The book ran to three versions.

Wallace used the lists format in two other books: The Official Punk Rock Book of Lists with Handsome Dick Manitoba (2007) and The Book of Lists: Horror (2008) co-written with Del Howison and her boyfriend Scott Bradley (b. 1972).

She also wrote The Prodigy, a biography of William James Sidis, published in 1986, and an erotic novel, Desire (1990).

== Personal life ==
Wallace was married for seven years to the musician Josef Marc. She dedicated her biography of William James Sidis, The Prodigy, to him. They divorced in 1986.

In 1990 she entered a relationship with anthropologist Carlos Castaneda, which she wrote about in her memoir, Sorcerer's Apprentice: My Life with Carlos Castaneda, published in 2003. The book was the first to reveal the private life of Castaneda, and detailed his hitherto mysterious "inner circle" of women who lived with him on a closed compound.

== Death ==
Wallace died of a heart condition in August 2013, aged 58.

== Bibliography ==
- The Book of Lists. William Morrow, 1977. (with Irving Wallace and David Wallechinsky)
- The Two: The Story of the Original Siamese Twins. Simon & Schuster, 1978. (with Irving Wallace)
- The Psychic Healing Book. Delacorte Press, 1978. (with Bill Henkin)
- The Book of Lists #2. William Morrow, 1980. (with Irving Wallace, David Wallechinsky and Sylvia Wallace)
- The Book of Predictions. William Morrow, 1980. (with David Wallechinsky and Irving Wallace)
- The Intimate Sex Lives of Famous People. Delacorte, 1981. (with Irving Wallace, David Wallechinsky and Sylvia Wallace)
- The Book of Lists #3. William Morrow, 1983. (with David Wallechinsky and Irving Wallace)
- Significa. Dutton, 1983. (with Irving Wallace and David Wallechinsky)
- The Prodigy: A Biography of William James Sidis, America's Greatest Child Prodigy. Dutton, 1986.
- Desire. Houghton Mifflin, 1990. ISBN 0395519519
- The Book of Lists: The '90s Edition. Little, Brown, 1993. (with David Wallechinsky)
- Sorcerer's Apprentice: My Life with Carlos Castaneda. North Atlantic Books, 2003. ISBN 1-58394-076-6
- The New Book of Lists, 2005. ISBN 1-84195-719-4. (with David Wallechinsky)
- The Official Punk Rock Book of Lists. Backbeat Books, 2007. ISBN 978-0879309190. (with Handsome Dick Manitoba)
- The Book of Lists: Horror. Harper, 2008. (with Del Howison and Scott Bradley)
