= The Book of Lists =

Any of a series of books compiled by David Wallechinsky, Irving Wallace, and Amy Wallace

The first volume of The Book of Lists.

The Book of Lists refers to any one of a series of books compiled by David Wallechinsky, his father Irving Wallace and sister Amy Wallace.

Each book contains hundreds of lists (many accompanied by textual explanations) on unusual or obscure topics, for example:

- Famous people who died during sexual intercourse
- The world's greatest libel suits
- People suspected of being Jack the Ripper
- Worst places to hitchhike
- Dr. Demento's 10 Worst Song Titles of All Time
- People misquoted by Ronald Reagan
- Breeds of dogs which bite people the most, and the least

The first Book of Lists was published in 1977, a second volume came out in 1980, and the third appeared in 1983. Book of Lists for the 1990s was published in 1993; yet another volume, The New Book of Lists, was published in 2005. The first volume was initially controversial and banned in some libraries and parts of the United States when it was published due to, among other things, a chapter that graphically described popular sexual positions and their pros and cons. The 2005 volume was essentially "new" in name only; it was made up primarily of reprinted and updated lists selected from the first three volumes, which have gone out of print.

Wallechinsky and Wallace were also responsible for editing The People's Almanac, which covered similar ground, as well as The Book of Predictions. They also contributed a weekly column in Parade magazine.

Other authors who have followed this basic format include Russ Kick, author of The Disinformation Book of Lists, Louis Rukeyser, author of Louis Rukeyser's Book of Lists, and Bernard Schwartz with A Book of Legal Lists. During the years, more than a hundred books with the Book of Lists in their title appeared.

In 2005, a Canadian edition of The Book of Lists was published and credited to David Wallechinsky, Amy Wallace, Ira Basen and Jane Farrow. The book contained a mixture of content from the original three volumes, mixed in with updated material and material with a specifically Canadian focus.

Wallace's story "The Abyssinian electric chair" (p. 463) was examined by historian Mike Dash in a Cliopatria award winning 2010 blog post which traces the story back to its probable source and concludes that Wallace's story is unlikely to be accurate.

== See also ==
- The Infinity of Lists
