= The Fan Club =

Novel by Irving Wallace

- First edition cover
- Author: Irving Wallace
- Publisher: Simon & Schuster
- Publication date: 29 March 1974
- Pages: 640
- ISBN: 0304293695

The Fan Club is a novel by Irving Wallace published in 1974 about a group of men who stalk and plan to kidnap and coerce a popular actress into having sex with them.

== Plot summary ==
Adam Malone is a supermarket manager in Los Angeles who is obsessed with blonde movie star Sharon Fields. While watching her on a television in a bar one night he meets three other men who are also enamored of her. They get to talking, and soon are planning her abduction. Believing the sex stories put out by her manager, they think that if they kidnap her she will understand their lust and have sex with them. They get a van and disguise it as an exterminator's, scout out her neighborhood and track her daily routine, find an isolated location to take her to, and plan vacations from their individual work.

A sudden crisis takes place when they discover that she will be leaving for Europe, forcing them to move their plans ahead of schedule. They confront her while she is taking a daily walk, and ask for directions. When she stops to help, she is grabbed and chloroformed. After being driven unconscious to their hideout, Sharon awakes and finds out what they want. She explains that the publicity is untrue, but one of the men won't take no for an answer and rapes her. Two of the others follow, with Adam not taking part. A series of nightly gang-rapes occurs, and Sharon decides to con them by faking she enjoys them in order to survive and possibly escape.

Deciding that they should not let the situation go to waste, they demand a ransom from the movie studio. Sharon writes a letter as proof they have her, but cleverly uses the first letters in each word to give the police a clue to her whereabouts. The ransom drop ends up with the three rapists killed, and Sharon saved. Because Adam saved her life from the rapist character Shiveley at the climax of the story, she omits his part in her abduction.

Adam is soon back at his job, obsessed with a new younger actress, and planning on forming a new fan club.

== Commercial Reception ==
The Fan Club was another New York Times best seller for Wallace: it spent 24 weeks on the list, peaking at #2.
