= Your Erroneous Zones =

1976 book by Wayne Dyer

- Author: Wayne Dyer
- Subject: Psychology
- Publication date: 1976
- ISBN: 0-308-10228-2

Your Erroneous Zones is the first self-help book written by Wayne Dyer. It was first issued by Funk & Wagnalls publishers in April 1976.

The book spent 64 weeks on The New York Times bestseller list, through November 13, 1977, including a spot at number one on the week of May 8, 1977.

== Contents ==
=== Chapter I: Taking Charge of Yourself ===
In this chapter, Dyer takes note of the brevity of life. He asserts that feelings are reactions one chooses to have. He points out that learning not to be unhappy is a tough assignment, as habits can only be changed by patience and persistence. Choice is a great power. He introduces the concept of immobilisation, and gives a checklist of instances. Living in the present moment (a habit) is all-important.

=== Chapter II: Self Love ===
The subheading of this chapter gives the basic idea/attitude upon which the whole of this book's message depends: people's personal, habitual feeling of self-worth. "Love yourself, a lot". For effective living, Dyer asserts that self-love must become a given, and says, "Under no circumstances is self-hate better than self-love".

=== Chapter III: You Do Not Need Their Approval ===
In this chapter, Dyer gives historical precedents for approval-seeking, and notes the "profusion of cultural approval-seeking messages". Early childhood, school, the Church, the government, popular songs, and television commercials are all dealt with. Dyer uses the phrase "coaxing approval-seeking downstairs, a step at a time" to describe the change in habit needed to more effectively deal with the hindrance of approval-seeking.

=== Chapter IV: Breaking Free From the Past ===
In the subheading of this chapter, Dyer uses a phrase which gives the main thrust of the chapter. "You are what you choose today, not what you've chosen before". He gives a list of 35 negative "I'ms", e.g. "I'm poor at math". The chapter continues with "How those "I'ms got started". Another thread through this chapter and the rest of the book is the neurotic dividends of erroneous zones. The "I'm" circle of thought is illustrated. Strategies to rid oneself of this ineffective behavior are listed, including eliminating one I'm for one day.

=== Chapter V: The Useless Emotions - Guilt and Worry ===
These emotions are classified as "useless" by Dyer. He places them on a continuum. Guilt is useless in regard to changing past events, worry useless in regard to the outcome of future events. Dyer states that worrying which "immobilizes" people in the present is not to be confused with careful planning, which is a rational and effective thing to do. The sources of guilt and worry habits are similar: parents, spouses, children, school, Church, eating, and sex. As in other chapters, Dyer lists the payoffs for choosing these emotions. Strategies for eliminating these damaging emotions are given. The critical worth of "present moment" living is restated as being the key to becoming more effective with regard to guilt and worry.

=== Chapter VI: Exploring the Unknown ===
Dyer begins by noting how people's early training makes us "safety experts", a big loss, as the mysterious is the source of all growth and excitement. He urges the reader to create habits of openness to new experiences, avoiding rigidity, prejudice and "always having a plan". He considers one of the constant and central themes of the whole book to be security, both internal and external varieties. Fear of failure is considered, and the benefit of the effective habit of an internal sense of self-worth is highlighted. As in other chapters, Dyer lists examples of this particular erroneous zone, supposed psychological benefits, and strategies to overcome it. The great benefit to humanity of the explorers and inventors is noted. An appropriate quote From Robert Frost is given.

== Criticism ==
Psychotherapist Albert Ellis writes that Dyer's book Your Erroneous Zones is probably "the worst example" of plagiarism of Ellis's rational emotive behavior therapy (REBT). In a 1985 letter to Dyer, Ellis claims that Dyer had participated in a workshop Ellis gave on REBT before Dyer published his book, in which Dyer appeared to understand REBT very well. Dyer probably had a fundamental understanding before continuing to explore this idea. Ellis adds that "300 or more people have voluntarily told me... that [the book] was clearly derived from REBT." Dyer never apologized or expressed any sense of wrongdoing. Ellis admonishes Dyer for unethically and unprofessionally not giving Ellis credit as the book's primary source, but expressed overall gratitude for Dyer's work, writing: "Your Erroneous Zones is a good book, ... it has helped a great number of people, and ... it outlines the main principles of REBT quite well,... with great simplicity and clarity."

Dyer's book Your Erroneous Zones makes a minor mention of Albert Ellis on page 148.
