= Wayne Dyer =

American writer (1940–2015)

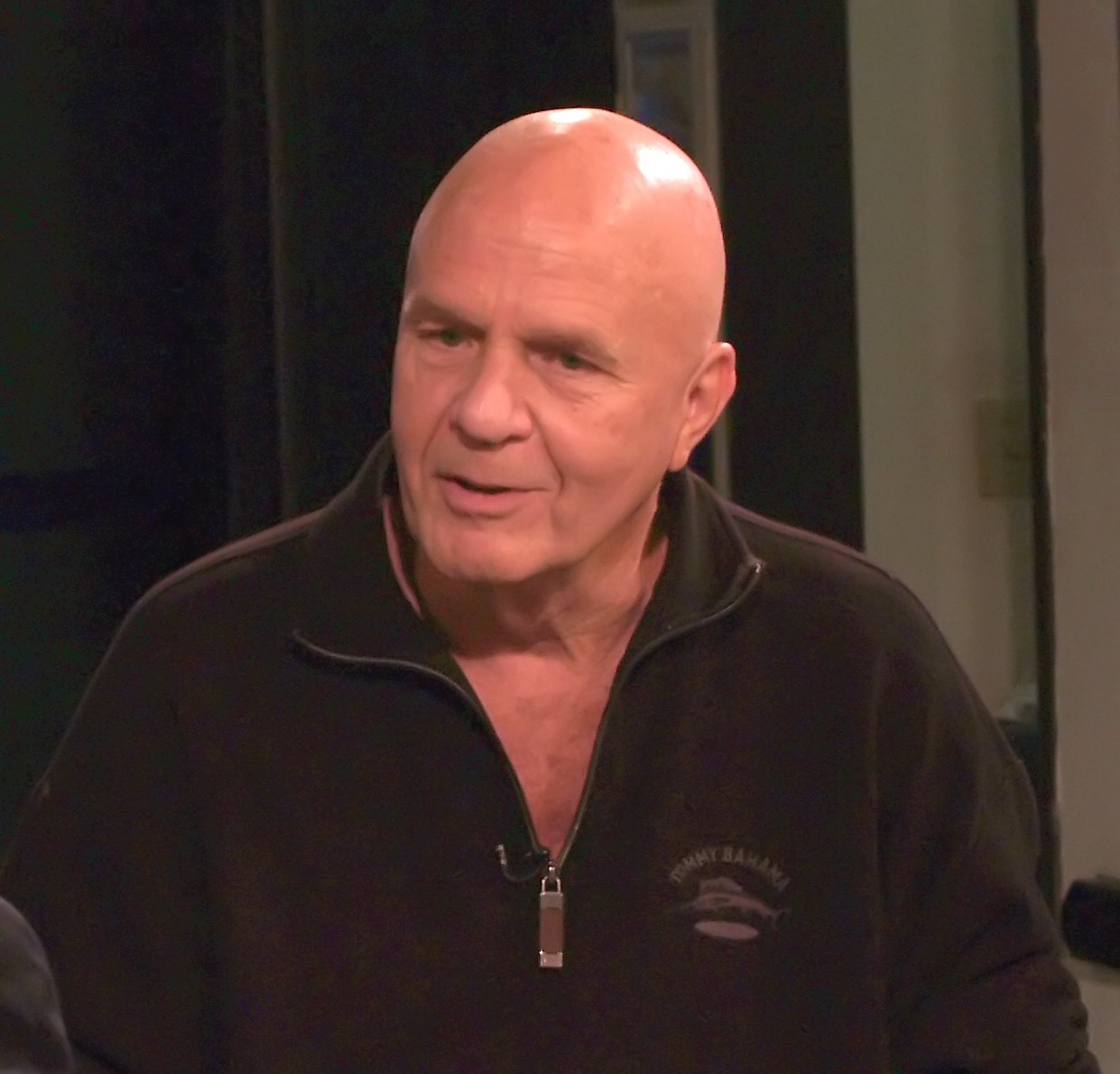
- Dyer in 2009
- Born: May 10, 1940; Detroit, Michigan, US
- Died: August 29, 2015 (aged 75); Maui County, Hawaii, US
- Education: BA History and Philosophy; MA Psychology; Ed.D Guidance and Counseling Wayne State University
- Occupations: Author; Motivational speaker; Psychologist; Therapist; Show host; Commentator
- Children: 8
- Military service
- Allegiance: United States
- Branch: United States Navy
- Service years: 1958–1962
- Rank: Petty officer second class
- Website: www.drwaynedyer.com

Wayne Walter Dyer (May 10, 1940 – August 29, 2015) was an American self-help author and a motivational speaker. Dyer earned a bachelor's degree in History and Philosophy, a master's degree in psychology and an Ed.D. in Guidance and Counseling at Wayne State University in 1970. Early in his career, he worked as a high school guidance counselor, and went on to run a successful private therapy practice. He became a popular professor of counselor education at St. John's University, where he was approached by a literary agent to put his ideas into book form. The result was his first book, Your Erroneous Zones (1976). This launched Dyer's career as a motivational speaker and self-help author, during which he published 20 more best-selling books and produced a number of popular specials for PBS. Influenced by Abraham Maslow and Albert Ellis, Dyer's early work focused on psychological themes such as motivation, self-actualization and assertiveness. By the 1990s, the focus of his work had shifted to spirituality. Inspired by Swami Muktananda and New Thought, he promoted themes such as the "power of intention," collaborated with alternative medicine advocate Deepak Chopra on a number of projects, and was a frequent guest on the Oprah Winfrey Show.

== Early life ==
Dyer was born in Detroit, Michigan, to Melvin Lyle Dyer and Hazel Irene Vollick. He spent much of his first ten years in an orphanage on the east side of Detroit, after his father walked out on the family, leaving his mother to raise three small boys. Dyer was later adopted by a loving but strict couple. After graduating from Denby High School, Dyer served in the United States Navy from 1958 to 1962. He received his Ed.D. degree in counseling from Wayne State University. His dissertation was titled Group Counseling Leadership Training in Counselor Education.

== Career ==
Dyer, a Detroit native, worked as a high school guidance counselor there and as a professor of counseling psychology at St. John's University in New York City. He pursued an academic career, published in journals, and established a private therapy practice. His lectures at St. John's University, which focused on positive thinking and motivational speaking techniques, attracted many students. Literary agent Arthur Pine persuaded Dyer to document his theories in his first book, called Your Erroneous Zones (1976). Dyer quit his teaching job and began a publicity tour of the United States, doggedly pursuing bookstore appearances and media interviews ("out of the back of his station wagon", according to Michael Korda, making the best-seller lists "before book publishers even noticed what was happening"). After Your Erroneous Zones dozens more books followed, many of them also best-sellers. Among them were Wishes Fulfilled, Excuses Begone and The Sky’s the Limit. The success of these books eventually led to national television talk show appearances including The Merv Griffin Show, The Tonight Show, and The Phil Donahue Show.

Dyer proceeded to build on his success with lecture tours, a series of audiotapes, PBS programs, and regular publication of new books. Dyer's message resonated with many in the New Thought Movement and beyond. He often recounted anecdotes from his family life and repeatedly used his own life experience as an example. His self-made man success story was a part of his appeal. Dyer told readers to pursue self actualization, calling reliance on the self a guide to "religious" experience, and suggested that readers emulate Jesus Christ, whom he termed both an example of a self-actualized person and a "preacher of self-reliance". Dyer criticized societal focus on guilt, which he saw as an unhealthy immobilization in the present due to actions taken in the past. He encouraged readers to see how parents, institutions, and even they, themselves, had imposed guilt trips upon themselves.

Although Dyer initially resisted the spiritual tag, by the 1990s he had altered his message to include more components of spirituality when he wrote the book Real Magic and discussed higher consciousness in the book Your Sacred Self.

== Influences ==
Wayne Dyer claimed Nisargadatta Maharaj as his teacher and cited the quotation: "Love says: 'I am everything'. Wisdom says: 'I am nothing'", from a compilation of talks on Advaita Vedanta (Nondualism) philosophy I Am That. He was influenced by Abraham Maslow's concept of self-actualization and by the teachings of Muktananda, whom he considered to be his Master. In his book, Wishes Fulfilled; Mastering the Art of Manifesting, Dyer also credited Saint Francis of Assisi and the Chinese philosopher Lao Tzu as foundational influences in his work.

== Books ==
Pulling Your Own Strings (copyright 1978) was Dyer's second work as sole author. It developed the idea of habitual "belief systems" hampering our personal effectiveness. Chapter 7, "Never Place Loyalty to Institutions and Things Above Loyalty to Yourself," included "Strategies for eliminating institutional victimisation."

The Sky is the Limit (copyright 1980) was the third work by Dyer as sole author. In it, Dyer introduced the concept of the "critical inch", that portion of life in which the ultimate meaning of our lives is considered. He was critical of the "hurry up" Western world. In Chapter 8, "Cultivating a sense of Purpose", he recommended such strategies as "Do something you have never done before," "Make a point to talk to a stranger today," and "Stop defending things as they have always been."

== Criticism ==
Psychologist Albert Ellis wrote that Dyer's book Your Erroneous Zones was probably "the worst example" of plagiarism of Ellis's Rational Emotive Therapy (RET). In a 1985 letter to Dyer, Ellis claimed that Dyer had participated in an Ellis workshop on RET before he published Your Erroneous Zones, in which Dyer appeared to understand RET very well. Ellis added that "300 or more people have voluntarily told me... that [the book] was clearly derived from RET." Dyer never apologized nor expressed any sense of wrongdoing. Ellis admonished Dyer for unethically and unprofessionally failing to credit Ellis's work as the book's primary source, but he never took legal action as ultimately he felt overall gratitude for Dyer's work, writing: "Your Erroneous Zones is a good book, ... it has helped a great number of people, and ... it outlines the main principles of RET quite well,... with great simplicity and clarity." In Your Erroneous Zones, Dyer makes reference to Albert Ellis in chapter seven. However, Dyer claimed (on pages 150–155 of his memoir I Can See Clearly Now, which was published by Hay House Publishing in 2014, one year before Dyer's death) that the entire premise of Your Erroneous Zones was principally derived from three years of audio tapes of the lectures that he gave while acting as a professor at St. John's University in New York.

In 2010, writer Stephen Mitchell filed a lawsuit against Dyer and his publisher, Hay House, for copyright infringement for taking 200 lines, without permission, from his version of the Tao Te Ching for Dyer's books Living the Wisdom of the Tao and Change Your Thoughts – Change Your Life. The suit was dismissed in 2011 after Dyer and Mitchell agreed to a settlement.

== Personal life ==
Dyer was married three times. With his first wife, Judy, he had a daughter. With his second wife, Susan Casselman, he had no children. With his third wife, Marcelene, he had five children, and two stepchildren from Marcelene's prior marriage. Wayne and Marcelene legally separated in 2001, after 20 years of marriage. After their separation period they reunited and remained married until his death.

=== Credos ===
Regarding his personal philosophical outlook, Dyer stated that:

My beliefs are that the truth is a truth until you organize it, and then it becomes a lie. I don't think that Jesus was teaching Christianity, Jesus was teaching kindness, love, concern, and peace. What I tell people is don't be Christian, be Christ-like. Don't be Buddhist, be Buddha-like.

Religion is orthodoxy, rules and historical scriptures maintained by people over long periods of time. Generally, people are raised to obey the customs and practices of that religion without question. These are customs and expectations from outside the person and do not fit my definition of spiritual.

== Death ==
Dyer died from a heart attack on Maui, Hawaii, on August 30, 2015, at age 75. He had been diagnosed with leukemia in 2009.

== Bibliography ==
=== Fiction book ===
- Gifts from Eykis (1983)

=== Nonfiction books ===
- Your Erroneous Zones (1976)
- Pulling Your Own Strings (1978)
- The Sky's the Limit (1980)
- Universe Within You: Your Secret Source of Strength (1981)
- What Do You Really Want For Your Children (1985)
- Happy Holidays (1986)
- You'll See It When You Believe It (1989)
- No More Holiday Blues (1990)
- Real Magic (1992)
- Your Sacred Self (1994)
- Awakening (1995)
- A Promise is a Promise (1996 – with Marcelene Dyer)
- Manifest Your Destiny (1997)
- 101 Ways to Transform Your Life (1998)
- Wisdom of the Ages (1998)
- There's a Spiritual Solution to Every Problem (2001)
- 10 Secrets for Success and Inner Peace (2002)
- Getting in the Gap (2002)
- The Power of Intention (2004)
- Staying on the Path (2004)
- Inspiration (2006 – Renamed Living an Inspired Life, March 2016)
- Everyday Wisdom (2006)
- Being in Balance (2006)
- Change Your Thoughts – Change Your Life (2007)
- The Invisible Force (2007)
- Living the Wisdom of the Tao (2008)
- Excuses Begone! (2009)
- The Shift (2010)
- A New Way of Thinking, a New Way of Being (2010)
- My Greatest Teacher (2012 – with Lynn Lauber)
- Wishes Fulfilled (2012)
- Co-creating at Its Best (2013 – with Esther Hicks)
- The Essential Wayne Dyer Collection (2013)
- Don't Die with Your Music Still in You (2014 – with Serena J. Dyer)
- I Can See Clearly Now (2014)
- Memories of Heaven (2015 – with Dee Garnes)
- Happiness Is the Way (2019)
- The Power of Awakening (2020)

=== Children's books ===
- Incredible You! (2005 – with Kristina Tracy)
- Unstoppable Me! (2006 – with Kristina Tracy)
- It's Not What You've Got! (2007 – with Kristina Tracy)
- No Excuses! (2009 – with Kristina Tracy)
- I Am (2012 – with Kristina Tracy)
- Good-bye, Bumps! (2014 – with Saje Dyer)

== Films ==
- Day & Night (2010), an animated short film created by Pixar, featuring an excerpt from one of Dyer's lectures and voiced by Dyer, which was shown with Toy Story 3 (2010) during the latter movie's opening in the U.S.
- The Shift (2009) explores the spiritual journey from ambition to meaning.
- American Hustle (2013) Jennifer Saunders character mentions to Christian Bale (playing her husband-who lands in trouble with a mobster) that she feels “his plan” to escape the problem was a result of her motivation and thus is resolved by “the power of intention”; she claims to be in mid-read of a book by motivational speaker and author Wayne Dyer. The film does not make clear whether that is a fictionalized publication title, but the film is set in New York/New Jersey in 1978 and the reference to Wayne Dyer the author is unmistakable.

== See also ==
- List of New Thought writers
- New Thought
- Spirituality
