= Russ Alben =

American advertising executive and composer (1929–2012)

Bernard Russ Alben (December 27, 1929 – August 26, 2012) was an American advertising executive and composer. He served as the Vice President and Creative Director of Ogilvy & Mather from the early 1970s until his retirement in December 1981. Alben is credited with writing the Good & Plenty's Choo Choo Charlie jingle and creating the Timex watch advertising slogan, "It takes a licking and keeps on ticking."

== Biography ==
=== Early life and career ===
Alben grew up in the Flatbush neighborhood of Brooklyn, New York and graduated from Midwood High School. He received a bachelor's degree in 1951 from Syracuse University, where he contributed to Radio Station WAER. He briefly worked as a producer for several children's television shows, such as Bozo the Clown, before beginning a forty-year career in advertising.

=== Advertising ===
Alben began his career in the ad industry by working as a copywriter at Benton & Bowles and then Grey Advertising. Many of his accounts dealt with accounts for children's toys and other products, including manufactured by Mattel, Hasbro and the Ideal Toy Company. He often had his two sons play with new toys to come up with commercial ideas. Alben created ad campaigns for Hot Wheels and wrote the script for the first Barbie Fashion Show.

Alben also worked on campaigns for foods, candies and children's cereals. He wrote the jingle Good & Plenty's Choo Choo Charlie television commercials. Alben held an advertising account for Post Cereal during the 1960s. He wrote songs for two of Post's advertising mascots, Linus the Lionhearted and Sugar Bear.

During the Fall of 1968, Alben became the creative director of the Carson Roberts Agency, based in Los Angeles, California. Alben became the Vice President and Creative Director of Ogilvy & Mather in the early 1970s, when Ogilvy acquired the Carson Roberts Agency. He remained the creative director of Ogilvy & Mather until his retirement in December 1981.

=== Composer ===
Alben and his wife, Ruth, wrote both of the official albums for the 1964 New York World's Fair, Jump to the Fair and Hop to New York. Alben also teamed with Jerry Hart to write the music for a play based on the life of Albert Einstein called "The Smartest Man in The World." The play opened in 2007 at the West Coast Jewish Theater. A Concert Adaptation of the musical's songs and lyrics were restaged by the Chapman on Broadway series at Chapman University in Orange, California in May 2014.

Russ Alben died from a short illness in Los Angeles on August 26, 2012, at the age of 82. He was survived by his wife, Alice Germanetti; two sons, Alex Alben and Ted Alben; and five grandchildren. He was buried at Hillside Memorial Park Cemetery in Culver City, California.
