= What Really Happened to the Class of '65? =

1976 non-fiction book

- First edition cover
- Author: Michael Medved, David Wallechinsky
- Genre: Non-fiction
- Publisher: Random House
- Publication date: 1976
- ISBN: 978-4-910-24649-9

What Really Happened to the Class of '65? is a 1976 non-fiction book by Michael Medved and David Wallechinsky. The authors were members of the senior class at Palisades High School in affluent suburban Los Angeles, California, which had been the focus of a 1965 Time magazine cover story on “Today’s Teenagers.” A decade later, the authors interviewed and wrote about 32 members of the class, including themselves, about their lives in high school and after. Among the chapters on each individual, the book interspersed thematic chapters of recollections on the Kennedy Assassination, Graduation, the Sexual Revolution, the Draft, and Confrontations. It concluded with an account of the 10th class reunion in 1975. One of the first profiles of the “Baby Boomer Generation,” the book was a best-seller.

A quasi-sequel written solely by Wallechinsky, Midterm Report Class of '65 (1986), also published as Class Reunion '65: Tales of an American Generation (1987), takes up the story twenty years after graduation. This time Wallechinsky drew on interviews with 1965 high school graduates nationwide. In the 28 individuals selected for the book, he particularly noted the profound impact of the Vietnam War on their lives. Two of those interviewees were Claudine Schneider, who had become a Republican member of Congress from Rhode Island, and President Jimmy Carter's son Jack. Recollections of Manuel Lauterio, who presumably died January 8, 1973, in a helicopter in Vietnam, were recounted by his wife and family. For his concluding chapter, Wallechinsky wrote a “midterm report” on his generation, assessing whether they had thus far left the world in a better condition than they found it, and compared it with the “midterm” and “late-term” reports he wrote on his parents’ generation, the Class of 1935.

== Adaptation ==
The book was later adapted into an anthology television series of the same name that aired on NBC from December 1977 to July 1978. The only regular was Tony Bill in the role of Sam Ashley. Others who appeared were Leslie Nielsen, Jane Curtin, Larry Hagman, Linda Purl, Meredith Baxter, and Emmaline Henry. The TV show was filmed at Grant High School in Van Nuys, California.
