= Alben Square =

Square in Borough Park, Brooklyn

Coordinates: 40°38′22″N 73°59′40″W

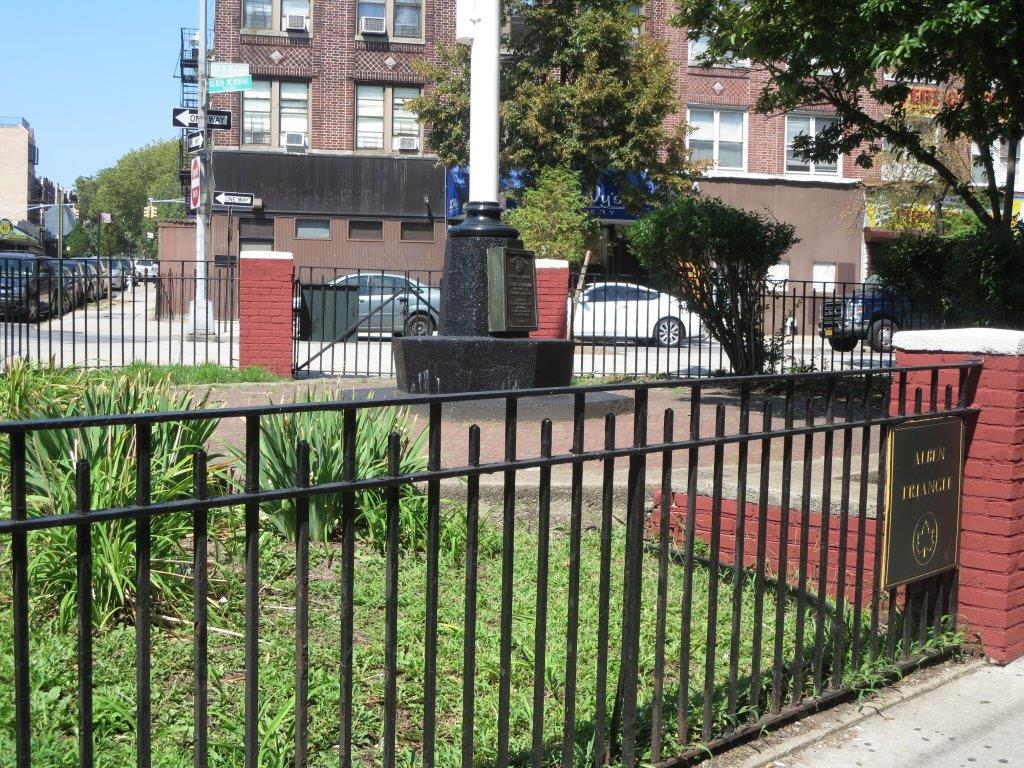
- Alben Square in 2014
- Interactive map of Alben Square
- Location: 46th Street and 11th Ave, Brooklyn, New York City, New York
- Established: 1918
- Named for: Bud Alben

Alben Square, also known as Alben Triangle, is a small public park and memorial located in the Borough Park neighborhood of Brooklyn, New York. It is named after Bud Alben, a Brooklyn native killed in action during World War I.

== History ==
The land that Alben Square now sits on was originally a part of the estate of Edward Backhouse, a merchant and Alderman. In 1923, the plot was memorialized to commemorate Bud Alben and other sons of Brooklyn killed in the First World War.

Alben Square, bounded by Fort Hamilton Parkway, New Utrecht, 11th Avenue, and 46th Street, bears a flagpole with a memorial plaque at its base, which was dedicated on June 19, 1935. The bronze plaque fixed to the flagpole reads: "Lest We Forget. Erected in Memory of the Veterans of Boro Park who Made the Supreme Sacrifice. Dedicated by Pvt. Bud H. Alben Post, No. 1436. Veterans of Foreign Wars of the United States. 1935." Members of the Post in Borough Park, Brooklyn, volunteered to maintain the property until 1935, when it was transferred to the jurisdiction of the New York City Department of Parks & Recreation.

On November 8, 2019, the park was rededicated after it was cleaned up, new vegetation was planted, benches were added, and the plaque, flagpole, bricks, fence, and signage were replaced. The renovation was privately funded by the family and the ceremony was led by the Brooklyn Borough Commissioner. Many of Bud's nieces, nephews and their families were in attendance.

== Namesake ==
The memorial and flagpole is named for Bud H. Alben, an enlisted private in the First Army (United States), 360th Division, who died in the St. Mihiel Offensive, which was fought from September 12–18, 1918. Alben Square was founded in 1926 by the Bud. H. Alben Post, Veterans of Foreign Wars. Alben died in one of the first significant engagements of the American Expeditionary Forces. Fondly known as the "Doughboys", the First Army under the command of General John J. Pershing fought directly against German units and their actions are widely credited as one of the key turning points in the stalemated battle along the front lines dividing Allied and German Forces.

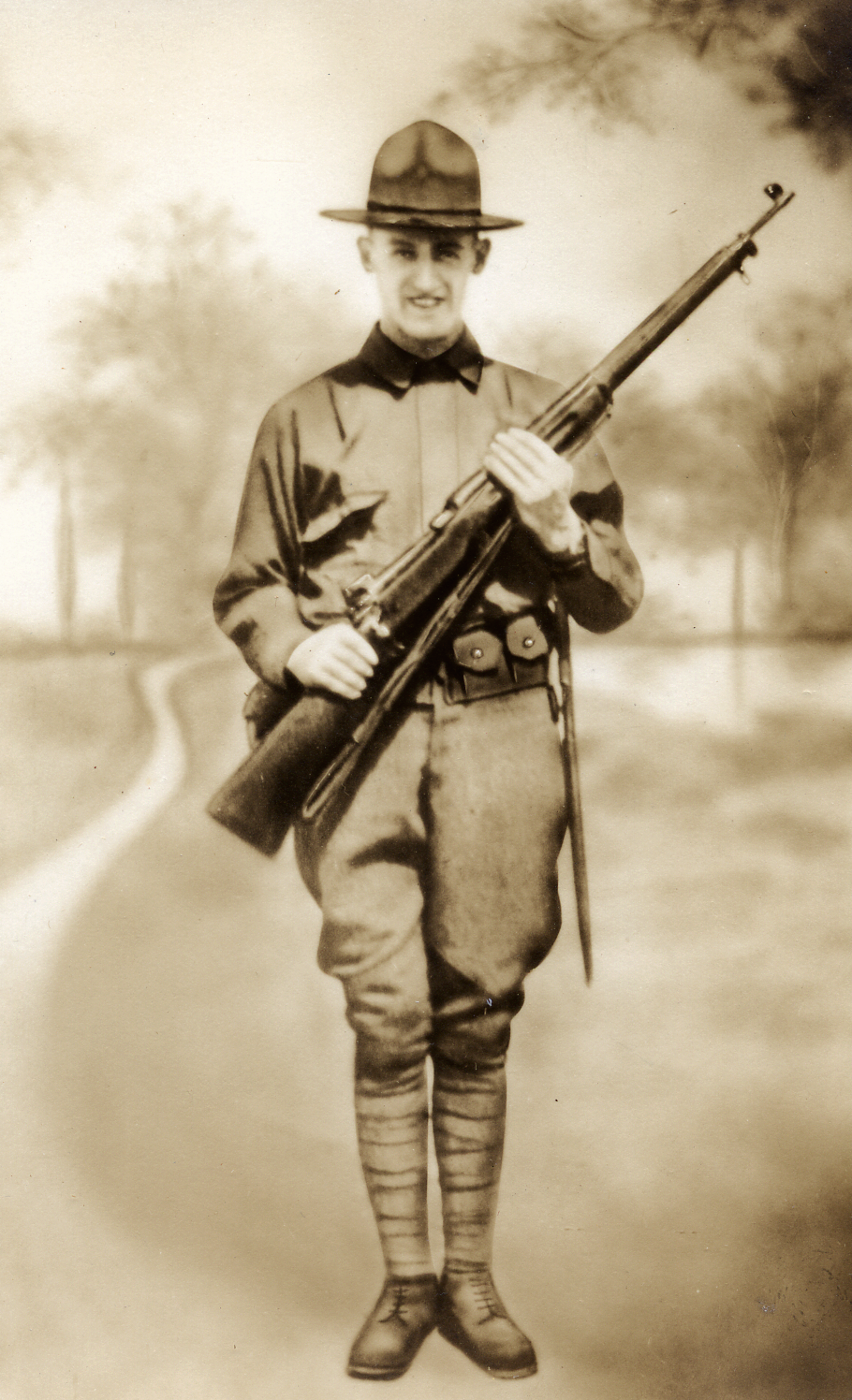
Bud Alben in his infantry uniform in 1918

According to a history of the 360th Division compiled by Second Lieutenant Victor F. Barnett, by late August 1918:

It had already become apparent that the plans of the First American Army centered on the eradication of the St. Mihiel salient which, since 1914, had penetrated menacingly into French territory, dangerously close to important avenues of communication if the Allies were to advance at other points along the line. And it was no less apparent that the general front occupied by the 90th Division would be the scene of important engagements during this action, and that the particular sector before the 360th Infantry was pregnant with danger. For in the Bois le Pretre there was, at this time, more barbed wire entanglements than existed, perhaps, on any other sector of the western front, and among the stone quarries to the right front the ramifications of the underground defenses had been limited only when they were pronounced impervious to assault by high German commanders. Until the actual issuance of the attack order this was the complex problem which seemingly confronted the regiment.

As a member of Company K of the Third Battalion, commanded by Major James W. F. Allen, Private Alben participated in a battle against German machine gun positions through the forest of Boise le Pretre on September 13, 1918. It was reported that on the morning of September 13 Colonel Price's regiment pierced the Boise le Pretre,

The attack was launched at 9:30 o'clock, and throughout the day the battle was waged. Keyed to a pitch of zeal which refused to recognize fatigue or the destructiveness at concentrated machine gun fire and high explosives bursting among them the battalions fought from a strong point to strong point until at 4 o'clock that afternoon a position on a line from Camp de la Scource on the left to Hill 319.2, north of Norroy, on the right, had been occupied. Camp de Norroy was entirely in the possession of the regiment and the town of Norroy itself had been swept clear of the Germans . . . The Boise le Pretre had been cleared, although at a considerable loss of life and many lesser casualties.

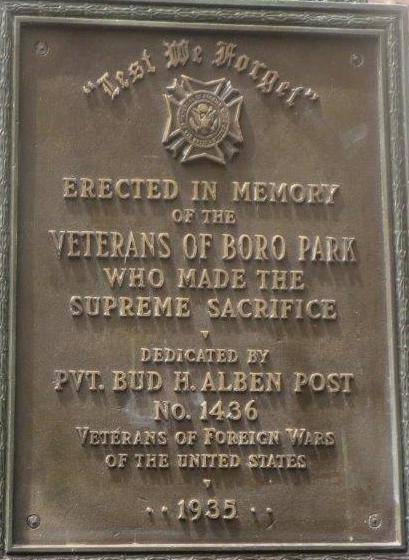
Plaque on flagstaff at Alben Square

Private Alben was struck by a shell in this engagement on September 13. Captain Walter Conner of Company K wrote a letter to Alben's parents informing them that, "Your son was wounded about 5 o'clock in the afternoon of September 13, 1918, in my presence, by a shell fired by the enemy. The shell exploded within a few feet of him and fragments entered and broke one of his lower limbs, and he also received an abdominal wound." On September 21, 1918, he died at a field hospital of intestinal infection resulting from this wound. An "Abstract of World War I Military Service" card lists his cause of death as "intestinal paralysis."

Captain Conner also wrote the Alben family that, "'Bud' was particularly popular among his comrades because of his ability to tell good, interesting stories, and on dark and dreary days when everything seemed blue they all turned to 'Bud' for a good and cheery story." Contemporary newspaper accounts relate that Bud was well liked and well known in South Brooklyn, which may account for the decision of his troop to name their post after him.

Bud Alben was born "Binyamin Alben" in New York and he was brought up in the Borough Park district of Brooklyn. He graduated from Public School No. 164 and the Manual Training High School. After attempting several times to enlist in the A.E.F., he was eventually drafted into the service on April 29, 1918.

Alben's World War I Military Service card indicates that he served with the 35th Company 152 Department Brigade from April 30 through June 16, 1918. He was transferred to the Hq Co 357 Infantry. His unit sailed to France on July 16, 1918, after brief training at Camp Upton. Finally he was transferred to Company K 360th Division, where he saw action and died in the St. Mihiel engagement. After a delay of over two years to transport the bodies of soldiers back to the United States, Alben was given a military funeral with religious services held at the synagogue on Fourteenth avenue and Forty-fifth street.

Alben was survived by his parents, Samuel and Esther Alben of 1313 42nd Street, Brooklyn. Bud was also survived by two younger brothers, Miles H. Alben, who was one of the first attorneys for Warner Bros. Pictures, and Dr. Irwin Alben, a prominent physician for many years with a family practice in Brooklyn.

== See also ==
- American Expeditionary Forces
