= Irving Wallace =

American writer (1916–1990)

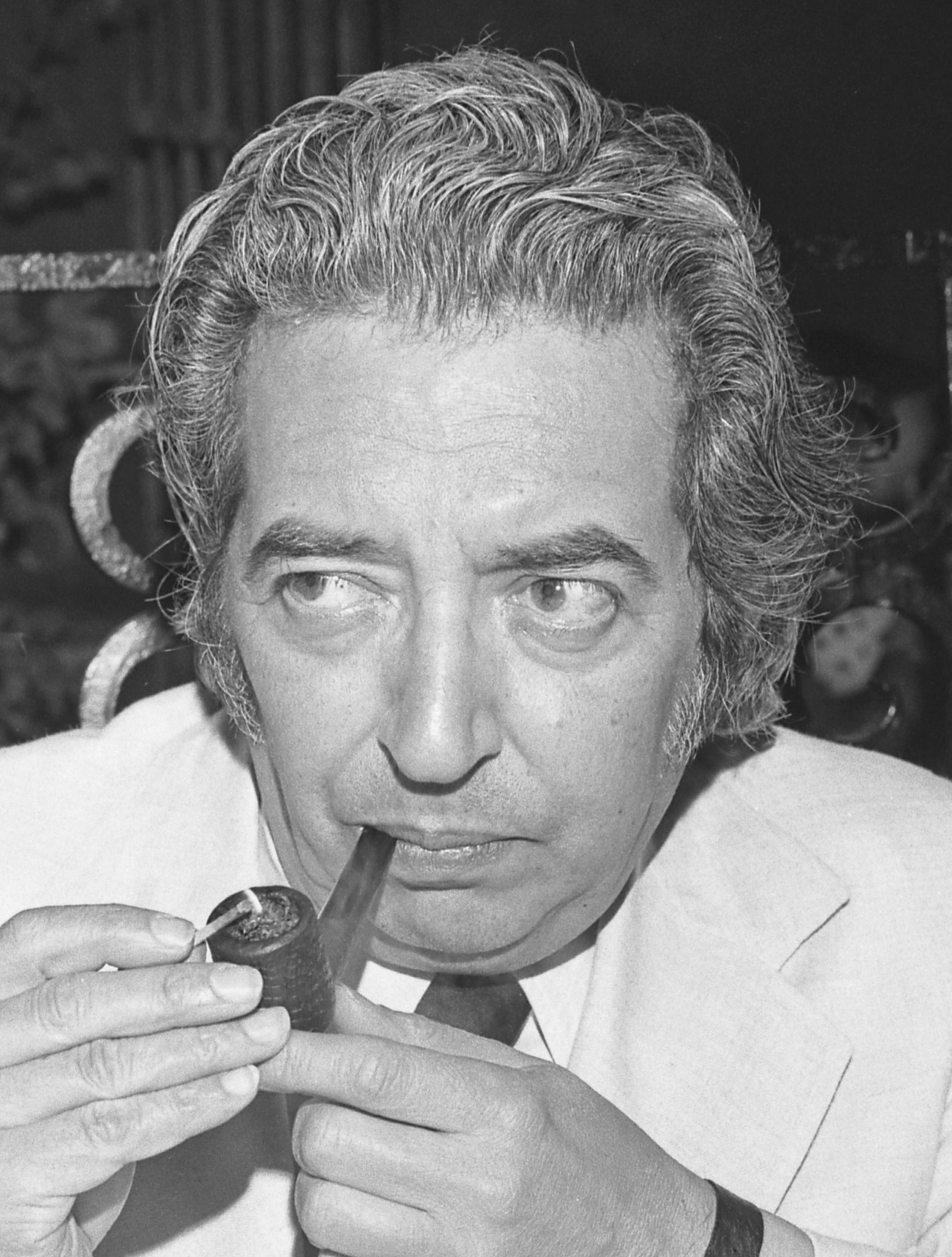
- Wallace in 1972
- Born: March 19, 1916; Chicago, Illinois, U.S.
- Died: June 29, 1990 (aged 74); Los Angeles, California, U.S.
- Occupations: Writer; journalist; screenwriter
- Spouse: Sylvia Kahn (1917-2006)
- Children: Amy Wallace; David Wallechinsky
- Parent(s): Bessie Liss; Alexander Wallace
- Writing career
- Period: 1955–1990
- Genres: Fiction, historical
- Notable works: The Fabulous Originals (1955); The Sins of Philip Fleming (1959)

Irving Wallace (March 19, 1916 – June 29, 1990) was an American best-selling author and screenwriter. He was known for his heavily researched novels, many with a sexual theme.

== Early life ==
Wallace was born in Chicago, Illinois, to Bessie Liss and Alexander Wallace (an Americanized version of the original family name of Wallechinsky). The family was Jewish and originally from Russia. Wallace was named after his maternal grandfather, a bookkeeper and Talmudic scholar of Narewka, Poland. Wallace grew up at 6103 Eighteenth Avenue in Kenosha, Wisconsin, where he attended Kenosha Central High School. He was the father of Olympic historian David Wallechinsky and author Amy Wallace.

== Career ==
Wallace began selling stories to magazines when he was a teenager. In the Second World War Wallace served in the Frank Capra unit in Fort Fox along with Theodor Seuss Geisel – better known as Dr. Seuss – and continued to write for magazines. He also served in the First Motion Picture Unit of the Army Air Force. Soon, however, Wallace turned to a more lucrative job as a Hollywood screenwriter. He collaborated on such films as The West Point Story (1950), Split Second (1953), Meet Me at the Fair (1953), and The Big Circus (1959). He also contributed three scripts to the western television program Have Gun – Will Travel.

After an unsatisfying stint in Hollywood, he devoted himself full-time to writing books. He published his first non-fiction work in 1955, The Fabulous Originals, and his first fiction offering, The Sins of Philip Fleming, in 1959. The latter, ignored by critics, was followed by the enormously successful The Chapman Report. Wallace published 33 books during his lifetime, translated into 31 languages.

Irving Wallace was married to Sylvia (née Kahn) Wallace, a former magazine writer and editor. Her first novel, The Fountains, was an American best-seller and published in twelve foreign editions. Her second novel, Empress, was published in 1980. She and her two children also helped him to produce The Book of Lists#2 and The Intimate Sex Lives of Famous People. In her autobiography, Amy Wallace wrote that her mother's contributions were not always helpful and the atmosphere not always harmonious. Sylvia Wallace died October 20, 2006, at age 89.

Several of Wallace's books have been made into films, including The Chapman Report, The Man, The Seven Minutes and New Delhi. Also among his best-known books are The Prize (1962), The Word (1972) and The Fan Club (1974).

Michael Korda and Peter Schwed were the editors for Wallace at Simon & Schuster. In his autobiography Another Life, Korda suggests that Wallace invented a style of novel that is at once a strong story and encyclopedia, with "some sex thrown in to keep the reader's pulse going."

With his son, daughter and wife he produced some notable non-fiction works, including three editions each of The People's Almanac (with son David) and The Book of Lists (with David and Amy and wife Sylvia for the second volume). Wallace used many of the odd facts he uncovered in his novels.

Wallace died of pancreatic cancer on June 29, 1990, at age 74. He was interred at Hillside Memorial Park Cemetery in Culver City, California.

== Bibliography ==
=== Novels ===
- The Sins of Philip Fleming: A Compelling Novel of One Man's Intimate Problem (1959)
- The Chapman Report (1960); made into a 1962 film
- The Prize (1962)
- The Three Sirens (1963)
- The Man (1964)
- The Plot (1967)
- The Seven Minutes (1969)
- The Word (1972)
- The Fan Club (1974)
- The R Document (1976)
- The Pigeon Project (1979)
- The Second Lady (1980)
- The Almighty (1982)
- The Miracle (1984/2005)
- The Seventh Secret (1986) (with an additional chapter by Tom Posch in the Dutch translation of 1989)
- The Celestial Bed (1987)
- The Golden Room (1988)
- The Guest of Honor (1989)

=== Non-fiction ===
- The Fabulous Originals: Lives of Extraordinary People Who Inspired Memorable Characters in Fiction (1955)
- The Square Pegs: Some Americans Who Dared to Be Different (1958)
- The Fabulous Showman: The Life and Times of P.T. Barnum (1959)
- The Twenty-Seventh Wife (1961)
- The Sunday Gentleman (1966)
- The Writing of One Novel (1968)
- The Nympho and Other Maniacs: The Lives, the Loves and the Sexual Adventures of Some Scandalous and Liberated Ladies (1971)
- The People's Almanac (1975)
- The Book of Lists (1977) (with David Wallechinsky and Amy Wallace)
- The Two: The Biography of The Original Siamese Twins (1978) (with Amy Wallace)
- The People's Almanac #2 (1978) (with David Wallechinsky)
- The Book of Lists#2 (1980) (with David Wallechinsky, Amy Wallace and Sylvia Wallace)
- The Book of Predictions (1981) (with David Wallechinsky and Amy Wallace)
- The People's Almanac #3 (1981) (with David Wallechinsky)
- The Intimate Sex Lives of Famous People (1981) (with David Wallechinsky, Amy Wallace and Sylvia Wallace)
- The Book of Lists#3 (1983) (with Amy Wallace and David Wallechinsky)
- Significa (1983) (with Amy Wallace and David Wallechinsky)

In 1974, John Leverance, of the Department of Popular Culture at Bowling Green State University (Ohio), published "Irving Wallace: A Writer's Profile", an analysis and appreciation of Wallace's work.
