= David Wallechinsky =

American historian and sportswriter (born 1948)

- Born: David Wallace; February 5, 1948 (age 78); Los Angeles, California, U.S.
- Education: Palisades High School
- Occupations: Author, television commentator, popular historian
- Known for: The People's Almanac; The Book of Lists; The Complete Book of the Olympics
- Political party: Independent
- Spouse: Flora Chavez (died 2023)
- Children: 2
- Parent(s): Irving Wallace; Sylvia Kahn
- Relatives: Amy Wallace (sister)
- Website: allgov.com

David Wallechinsky (born David Wallace, February 5, 1948) is an American popular historian and television commentator, the co-founder and past president of the International Society of Olympic Historians (ISOH) and the founder and editor-in-chief of AllGov.com and worldfilmreviews.us.

== Early life ==
Wallechinsky was born in Los Angeles to a Jewish family, the son of writer Sylvia Kahn and the author and screenwriter Irving Wallace. His younger sister was fellow author Amy Wallace, a "witch" of Carlos Castaneda who co-wrote many books with him and their father and authored Sorcerer's Apprentice: My Life with Carlos Castaneda in 2003.

He was educated at Palisades High School in Pacific Palisades, Los Angeles, California, graduating in 1965. One of his classmates was the future film critic and talk radio host Michael Medved, and they later wrote What Really Happened to the Class of '65, based on a series of interviews with their former classmates.

== Career ==
In 1973, Wallechinsky grew dismayed with almanacs that, in his opinion, rehashed bare facts. He began developing an idea for a reference book to be read for pleasure, that would include lesser-known history. He worked on the book for a year, before being joined by his father for an additional year of research. The People's Almanac was published by Doubleday in 1975 and became a best-seller. One of the most popular chapters was a selection of lists, leading Wallechinsky (in conjunction with his father and sister Amy) to write The Book of Lists, which became an international best-seller. Both books spawned not only follow-up editions but copycat titles such as The Ethnic Almanac, The Jewish Almanac, and The Book Of TV Lists.

In 1960, Wallechinsky's father took him to the Rome Olympic Games. In 1984, he published the first edition of his work The Complete Book of the Olympics, a reference work with full results and many anecdotes about the modern Games. The book became unwieldy so was later split into two volumes The Complete Book of the Summer Olympics and The Complete Book of the Winter Olympics series. Wallechinsky now shares the editorial duties with his nephew Jaime Loucky. The books led to work for Wallechinsky as an Olympic commentator for NBC.

In 1985, Wallechinsky followed the book previously co-authored with Medved with a sequel, going back to his high school graduation year contemporaries and solely writing a similar retrospective Midterm Report: The Class of '65: Chronicles of an American Generation about pupils from across America who left high school in that year. He interviewed twenty-eight of those 1965 graduates including President Jimmy Carter's son Jack, and Rhode Island's congressional Representative Claudine Schneider. It was later published as "Class Reunion '65, Tales of an American Generation," written from the perspective of two decades post-high school graduation. In the book, Wallechinsky noted the profound impact that the Vietnam War had on the lives of his interview subjects.

In 1991, he was one of the founding members of the International Society of Olympic Historians (ISOH). He served as treasurer of the organization from 1996 to 2004, vice-president from 2004 to 2012, then served as the organization's president. Wallechinsky is the founder of AllGov.com, which provides news about various departments and agencies of the American government. AllGov describes the functions of each agency, their histories, and controversies, and shares critiques and suggested reforms from both the left and the right.

He has compiled the list of "The World’s 10 Worst Dictators" for Parade magazine for a number of years. In 2006, this subject became a book entitled: Tyrants: The World’s 20 Worst Living Dictators.

== Personal life ==
Wallechinsky is a vegetarian and married to Flora Chavez (1946 to 2023). They have two sons: Elijah Chavez Wallechinsky, born in 1983, and Aaron Chavez Wallechinsky. born in 1986. Both brothers are photographers and designers. Wallechinsky splits his time between Santa Monica, California and the south of France.

== Bibliography ==
- Chico's Organic Gardening and Natural Living (1972) With Frank "Chico" Bucaro
- Laughing Gas: Nitrous Oxide, with Michael Sheldin and Saunie Salyer (And/Or Press, 1973)
- The People's Almanac (Doubleday, 1975) (with Irving Wallace)
- What Really Happened to the Class of '65? (1976) (with Michael Medved)
- The Book of Lists (William Morrow, 1977) (with Irving Wallace and Amy Wallace)
- The People's Almanac #2 (William Morrow, 1978) (with Irving Wallace)
- The Book of Lists #2 (William Morrow, 1980) (with Irving Wallace, Amy Wallace and Sylvia Wallace)
- The Book of Predictions (1980) (with Amy Wallace and Irving Wallace)
- The People's Almanac #3 (William Morrow, 1981) (with Irving Wallace)
- The Intimate Sex Lives of Famous People (Delacorte, 1981) (with Irving Wallace, Amy Wallace and Sylvia Wallace)
- The Book of Lists #3 (William Morrow, 1983) (with Amy Wallace and Irving Wallace)
- Significa (Dutton, 1983) (with Irving Wallace and Amy Wallace)
- The Complete Book of the Olympics (Penguin, 1984)
- Midterm Report: The Class of '65: Chronicles Of An American Generation (1986); later published as Class Reunion '65, Tales of an American Generation
- The Book of Lists: The '90s Edition (Little, Brown, 1993) (with Amy Wallace)
- The People's Almanac Presents The 20th Century: History With The Boring Parts Left Out (Little, Brown, 1999)
- The New Book of Lists (2005) (with Amy Wallace)
- Tyrants: The World’s 20 Worst Living Dictators (ReganBooks, 2006)
- The Complete Book of the Summer Olympics (various editions) (with Jaime Loucky)
- The Complete Book of the Winter Olympics (various editions) (with Jaime Loucky)
