= Abortion in Kansas =

2022 Kansas abortion referendum map

Abortion in Kansas is legal. Kansas law allows for an abortion up to 20 weeks post-fertilization (22 weeks after the last menstrual period). After that point, only in cases of life or severely compromised physical health may an abortion be performed. In July 2024, the Kansas Supreme Court struck down two abortion restrictions.

The state also had detailed abortion-specific informed consent requirement by 2007. Targeted Regulation of Abortion Providers (TRAP) law applied to medication-induced abortions and private doctor offices, in addition to abortion clinics, were in place by 2013. In 2015, Kansas became the first state to ban the dilation and evacuation procedure, a common second-trimester abortion procedure. State laws about abortion have been challenged at the Kansas Supreme Court and US Supreme Court level. On August 2, 2022, Kansas voters rejected a constitutional amendment that would have allowed the Republican-controlled legislature to restrict or ban abortion in Kansas, following the overturning of Roe v. Wade.

The number of abortion clinics in the state has been declining in recent years, going from 23 in 1982, to 15 in 1992, to 4 in 2014. There were 7,219 legal abortions in 2014, and 6,931 in 2015. Almost half were obtained by out-of-state residents. The state has seen anti-abortion rights violence, including the kidnapping of a doctor in 1982 and the killing of Doctor George Tiller in 2009.

== History ==
=== Legislative history ===
In the 19th century, bans by state legislatures on abortion were about protecting the life of the mother given the number of deaths caused by abortions; state governments saw themselves as looking out for the lives of their citizens.

In 1997, the Kansas legislature passed the Woman's Right to Know Act, which required, except in the case of a medical emergency, a 24-hour period between the time that the woman is informed in writing of legally-required information and the abortion. The state passed a law in the 2000s banning abortions at 22 weeks based on the theory that a fetus can feel pain at that point in development. The state was one of 23 states in 2007 to have a detailed abortion-specific informed consent requirement. Some states, including Kansas, have passed laws requiring abortion providers to warn patients of a link between abortion and breast cancer and to issue other scientifically unsupported warnings. In 2013, state Targeted Regulation of Abortion Providers (TRAP) law applied to medication induced abortions and private doctor offices in addition to abortion clinics. An anti-abortion bill was introduced and referred to committee in February 2013. The bill was presented to the Kansas House in March 2013. The bill was known as House Bill 2324, "An act prohibiting an abortion of an unborn human individual with a detectable fetal heartbeat." One outspoken advocate of such bills was Mark Gietzen, who tried to gather as many signatures as possible in order to get then-Governor Sam Brownback to convene a special session of Congress in order to consider the bill. Gietzen also advocated for a fetal heartbeat law to be passed during a special session of the Kansas legislature, to be held on September 3, 2013. HB 2324 died in committee in May 2014. Kansas lawmakers approved sweeping anti-abortion legislation (HB 2253) on April 6, 2013, that says life begins at fertilization, forbids abortion based on gender and bans Planned Parenthood from providing sex education in schools. The state was one of six that tried to ban abortions in 2013. The state legislature was one of five states nationwide that tried, and failed, to pass a fetal heartbeat bill in 2014.

In 2015, Kansas became the first state to ban the dilation and evacuation procedure, a common second-trimester abortion procedure. But the new law was later struck down by the Kansas Court of Appeals in January 2016 without ever having gone into effect. In April 2019, the Kansas Supreme Court affirmed the lower court's decision, and ruled that the right to abortion is inherent within the state's constitution and bill of rights, such that even if Roe v. Wade was overturned and the federal protection of abortion rights was withdrawn, the right would still be allowed within Kansas, barring a change in the state constitution. In mid-May 2019, state law banned abortion after week 22. In 2019, women in Kansas were eligible for pregnancy accommodation and pregnancy-related temporary disability as a result of abortion or miscarriage if their employer had four or more employees. Employers were required to offer unpaid leave upon request and employees could not be punished for requesting it.

==== The Value Them Both Amendment ====
In response to the 2019 Kansas Supreme Court ruling, on January 29, 2020, the Kansas Senate passed SCR 1613, a proposition to add the Value Them Both Amendment to the state constitution. The Value Them Both Amendment would overturn the 2019 Kansas Supreme Court ruling, stating that "the constitution of the state of Kansas does not require government funding of abortion and does not create or secure a right to abortion" (SCR 1613). On February 7, 2020, the proposed amendment failed to reach the need two-thirds majority vote in the Kansas House of Representatives.

On January 22, 2021, the Kansas House of Representatives passed HCR 5003, a new proposition to add the Value Them Both Amendment to the state constitution. Six days later on Jan. 28, the Kansas Senate passed the Amendment. The proposed amendment was voted upon in a referendum on August 2, 2022, and defeated.

The Concurrent Resolution proposed "to amend the bill of rights of the constitution of the state of Kansas by adding a new section thereto stating that there is no constitutional right to abortion, and reserving to the people the ability to regulate abortion through the elected members of the legislature of the state of Kansas." (HCR 5003)

The full text of the Value Them Both Amendment states:

"Because Kansans value both women and children, the constitution of the state of Kansas does not require government funding of abortion and does not create or secure a right to abortion. To the extent permitted by the constitution of the United States, the people, through their elected state representatives and state senators, may pass laws regarding abortion, including, but not limited to, in circumstances of pregnancy resulting from rape or incest, or when necessary to save the life of the mother." (HCR 5003)

The ballot would include the following explanation:

"The Value Them Both Amendment would affirm there is no Kansas constitutional right to abortion or to require the government funding of abortion, and would reserve to the people of Kansas, through their elected state legislators, the right to pass laws to regulate abortion, including, but not limited to, in circumstances of pregnancy resulting from rape or incest, or when necessary to save the life of the mother. A vote for the Value Them Both Amendment would affirm there is no Kansas constitutional right to abortion or to require the government funding of abortion, and would reserve to the people of Kansas, through their elected state legislators, the right to pass laws to regulate abortion. A vote against the Value Them Both Amendment would make no changes to the constitution of the state of Kansas, and could restrict the people, through their elected state legislators, from regulating abortion by leaving in place the recently recognized right to abortion." (HCR 5003)

On August 2, Kansas voters defeated the measure; abortion remains legal in Kansas.

=== Judicial history ===
The US Supreme Court's decision in 1973's Roe v. Wade ruling meant the state could no longer regulate abortion in the first trimester. In 1983's Planned Parenthood Association of Kansas City v. Ashcroft, the US Supreme Court said the state could require two doctors be present when a third-trimester abortion was being performed and that the abortion providers for third-trimester abortions could be required to submit a pathology report to the state. The US Supreme Court did allow for only one doctor in the case of an emergency. In 2018, the Kansas Supreme Court ruled on the state's 2015 abortion ban. The U.S. Supreme Court overturned Roe v. Wade in Dobbs v. Jackson Women's Health Organization, No. 19-1392, 597 U.S. ___ (2022) later in 2022.

On July 5, 2024, the Kansas Supreme Court struck down two laws restricting abortion: a procedure that's common in the second trimester and certain regulations that apply to abortion providers.

=== Clinic history ===
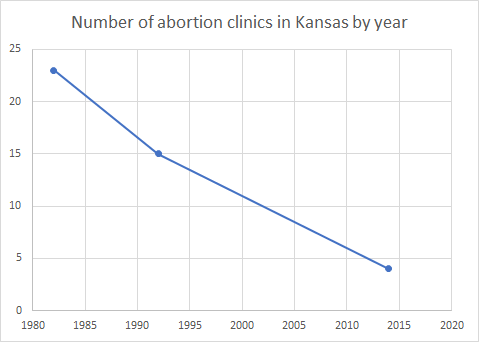
Number of abortion clinics in Kansas by year

Between 1982 and 1992, the number of abortion clinics in the state decreased by eight, going from 23 in 1982 to fifteen in 1992. In 2014, there were four abortion clinics in the state. In 2014, 97% of the counties in the state did not have an abortion clinic. That year, 56% of women in the state aged 15–44 lived in a county without an abortion clinic. In 2017, there were two Planned Parenthood clinics, both of which offered abortion services, in a state with a population of 644,117 women aged 15–49.

In 2013, Julie Burkhart opened a clinic in Wichita called Trust Women Wichita, part of Trust Women Foundation. Burkhart was a colleague of the murdered Dr. George Tiller, and by 2013 she had taken over Tiller's clinic following his murder. Because of state law, providing abortions to women in the area added costs, both financial and time, for both the clinic and women seeking abortions.

== Statistics ==
In the period between 1972 and 1974, there were zero recorded illegal abortion deaths in the state. In 1990, 276,000 women in the state faced the risk of an unintended pregnancy. In 2010, the state had zero publicly funded abortions. In 2013, among white women aged 15–19, there were 270 total abortions, 50 abortions for black women aged 15–19, 60 abortions for Hispanic women aged 15–19, and 40 abortions for women of all other races.

Public opinion is split concerning the legal status of abortion. In 2014, 49% of adults said in a poll of 307 Kansans by the Pew Research Center that abortion should be legal vs 49% that said it should be illegal in all or most cases. In 2016, Fort Hays State University's Kansas Speaks survey reported from a sample size of 1,043 that 26% of respondents opposed abortion in all situations, 38% were in favor of abortion is some situations, 8% were in favor of abortion in most situations, and 29% said abortion should be permitted for any woman that chooses it.

Kansas Speaks Survey: "In which of the following situations would you support abortion?"
	Yes	No
When the mother's life is in danger (n = 440)	96%	4%
In instances of rape (n = 428)	86%	14%
In instances of incest (n = 428)	86%	15%
When there is evidence that the fetus will have serious future health problems (n = 406)	65%	35%
When the mother cannot afford a baby (n = 436)	14%	86%

In a 2018-Midterms Voter Analysis by Fox News, using survey data from the National Opinion Research Center and The Associated Press with 929 respondents, 19% of those surveyed said abortion should be legal in all cases, 35% said abortion should be legal in most cases, 32% said abortion should be illegal in most cases, and 14% said abortion should be illegal in all cases. In the same analysis, with 3,905 respondents, 4% said abortion was the most important issue facing the country, of which in the Kansas gubernatorial election, 82% voted for Republican candidate Kris Kobach, 14% voted for Democratic candidate Laura Kelly, 2% voted for independent candidate Greg Orman, and 2% voted for another candidate.

Number of reported abortions, abortion rate and percentage change in rate by geographic region and state in 1992, 1995 and 1996
Census division and state	Number			Rate			
Census division and state	1992	1995	1996	1992	1995	1996	Proportional difference 1996 from 1992 (%)
West North Central	57,340	48,530	48,660	14.3	11.9	11.9	−16
Iowa	6,970	6,040	5,780	11.4	9.8	9.4	−17
Kansas	12,570	10,310	10,630	22.4	18.3	18.9	−16
Minnesota	16,180	14,910	14,660	15.6	14.2	13.9	−11
Missouri	13,510	10,540	10,810	11.6	8.9	9.1	−21
Nebraska	5,580	4,360	4,460	15.7	12.1	12.3	−22
North Dakota	1,490	1,330	1,290	10.7	9.6	9.4	−13
South Dakota	1,040	1,040	1,030	6.8	6.6	6.5	−4

Number, rate, and ratio of reported abortions, by reporting area of residence and occurrence and by percentage of abortions obtained by out-of-state residents, US CDC estimates
Location	Residence			Occurrence				Year	Ref.
Location	No.	Per capita (Note: Number of abortions per 1,000 women aged 15–44)	Per birth (Note: Number of abortions per 1,000 live births)	No.	Per capita	Per birth	Proportion by out-of-state residents (%)	Year	Ref.
Kansas	3,779	6.7	96	7,219	12.9	184	49.6	2014	
Kansas	3,637	6.5	93	6,931	12.4	177	49	2015	
Kansas	3,484	6.2	92	6,790	12.2	178	49.8	2016	

== Abortion rights views and activities ==
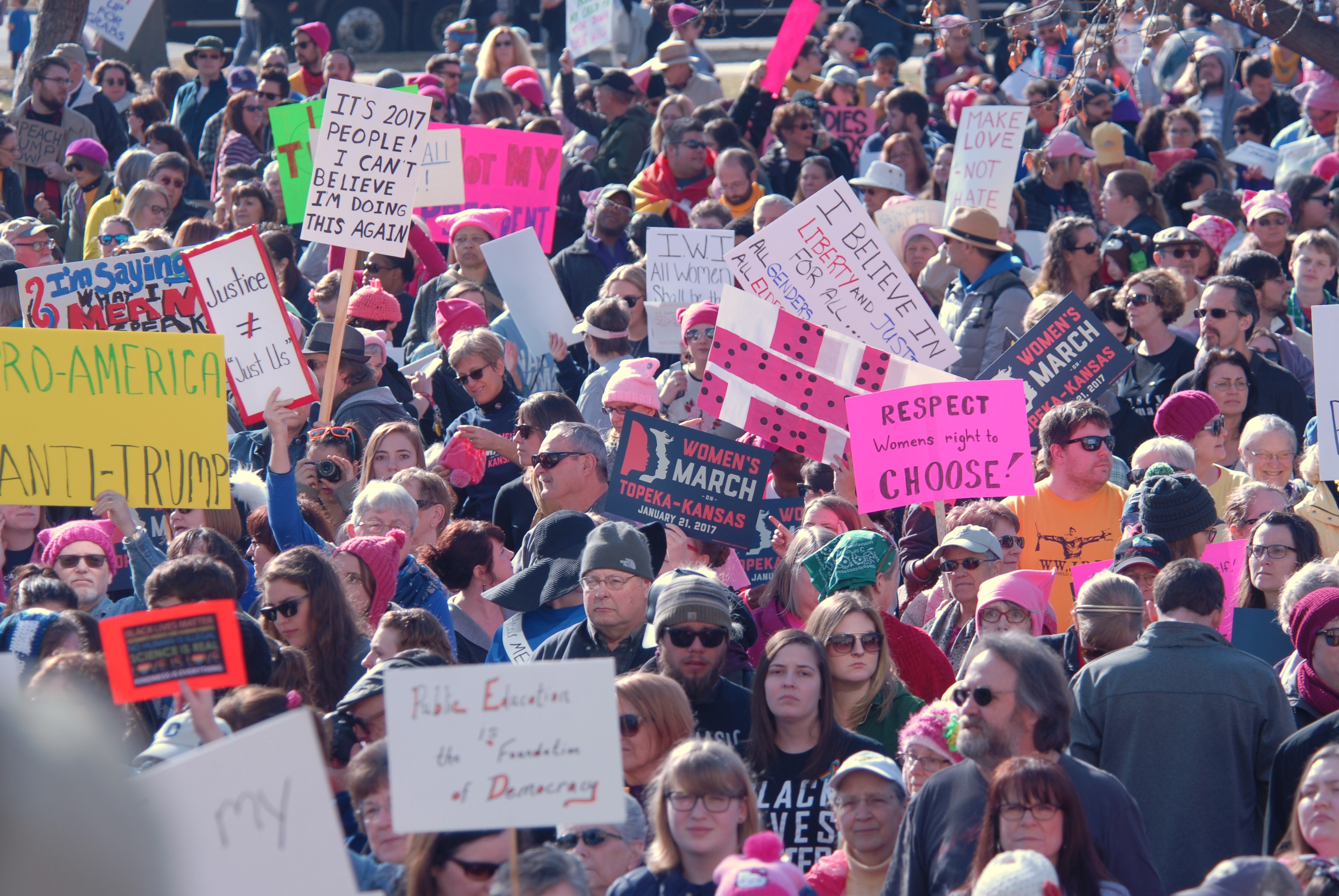
Women's March Topeka, Kansas, 2017

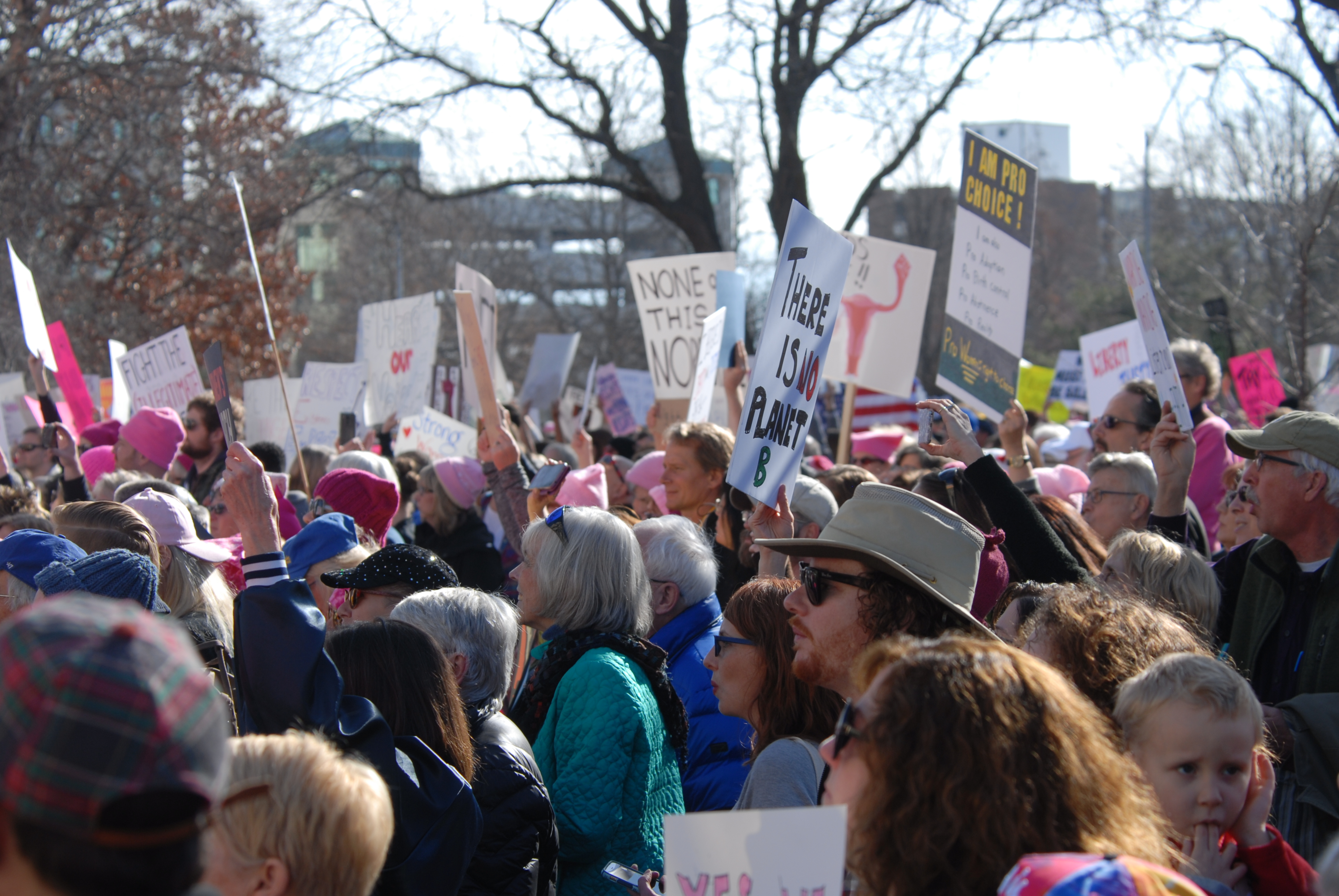
Women's March Topeka, Kansas, 2017

=== Protests ===
Women from the state participated in marches supporting abortion rights as part of a #StoptheBans movement in May 2019.

Following the overturn of Roe v. Wade on June 24, 2022, hundreds of abortion rights protesters gathered outside the Kansas State Capitol in Topeka, Kansas.

On August 22, 2024, an abortion rights and gun safety rally was held in Leawood, Kansas.

== Anti-abortion views and activities ==
=== Activities ===
In 1983, Kansans for Life was formed. In 1991 in Wichita, Operation Rescue blockaded three abortion clinics over a six-week period as part of an effort they called the "Summer of Mercy". This was one of three large pro-life protests that received extensive media coverage.

=== Violence ===
In August 1982, three men identifying as the Army of God kidnapped Hector Zevallos, a doctor and clinic owner, and his wife, Rosalee Jean, holding them for eight days and released them unharmed.

On May 19, 1993, shots were fired into the home of Dr. Robert Crist of Overland Park, Kansas. The assailant was never caught.

In 1993, Shelley Shannon, an Army of God member, admitted to the attempted murder of Dr. George Tiller. Law enforcement officials found the Army of God Manual, a tactical guide to arson, chemical attacks, invasions, and bombings buried in Shelley Shannon's backyard.

Dr. George Tiller was shot and killed by Scott Roeder on May 31, 2009, as Tiller served as an usher at a church in Wichita, Kansas. Witnesses said that Roeder walked up and put a gun to Tiller's head before shooting him. As a consequence of his death, his family closed the clinic where he performed abortions. The murder was one of the first occasions in the United States where a clinic closed as a result of an abortion clinic related murder.
