= Julie Burkhart =

American abortion clinic operator

Julie Burkhart is an American reproductive rights leader and operator of abortion clinics in the United States. She first became active in Wichita, Kansas, working for George Tiller and reopening his clinic after his 2009 murder. Burkhart oversaw the opening of an abortion clinic in Oklahoma in 2016. In 2021, she shifted her focus to Wyoming and opened an abortion clinic there in 2023. In 2025 Burkhart was named one of the Time 100 most influential people for her work.

== Biography ==
Julie Burkhart was born March 6, 1966 and grew up in Northern Oklahoma. She has cited her experience of protests during the 1991 'Summer of Mercy' in Wichita as influencing her activism for reproductive rights. That summer, Burkhart was working at the Wichita Women's Cernter in Wichita, Kansas, and saw thousands of anti-abortion protestors throughout the city. She attended school in Seattle and planned to attend, but did not eventually enter, medical school.

After graduation, Burkhart began working on political campaigns, and by 2001 was working in Wichita for Planned Parenthood. That year she met George Tiller, an abortion provider based in Wichita known for offering late term abortions. He became a prominent mentor to Burkhart, and she soon began working for his clinic, managing public affairs. After Tiller was murdered in 2009, she took over the clinic, reopening it under the name "Trust Women" in 2013. The clinic opened a second location in Oklahoma City, Oklahoma in 2016 and acquired a clinic in Seattle, Washington in 2017.

In 2020, Burkhart began working to develop an abortion clinic in Casper, Wyoming. The state had limited abortion clinics, and a local nonprofit had reached out to her asking for help. The clinic she founded, Wellspring Health Access, took several years to develop. In 2022, Wyoming passed legislation that would have largely banned abortions. Burkhart responded by suing the state, and the ban was overturned in court. In May 2022, an attempted arson damaged the clinic. Legislation was subsequently passed restricting the ability of abortion clinics to provide abortions. As of April 2025, the clinic does not actively provide abortions but is still open. Burkhart also co-owns an abortion clinic in Illinois.

In 2025 Burkhart was named one of the Time 100 most influential people.

== Personal life ==
Burkhart is married and has one daughter. She resides in Colorado.
