= Cheryl Sullenger =

American activist (born 1955)

- Born: Cheryl Deann Sullenger; 1955 (age 69–70); United States
- Occupation: Anti-abortion activist

Cheryl Deann Sullenger (born 1955) is an American anti-abortion activist. Sullenger is the senior vice president for Kansas-based Operation Rescue, an organization that works to oppose abortion and to document legal violations by abortion providers. In 1987, she was convicted and imprisoned for two years for participating in a felony attempt to bomb an abortion clinic. She has previously made false claims against individuals that have endangered their careers and lives.

== Anti-abortion activism ==
Sullenger started her involvement with the anti-abortion movement in 1984, volunteering for a crisis pregnancy center in San Diego County.

=== Attempted bombing of abortion clinic ===
Sullenger and her husband, Randall, were members of the Bible Missionary Fellowship, a fundamentalist church in Santee, California. On July 27, 1987, a member of that church attempted to bomb the Family Planning Associates abortion business. Sullenger procured gunpowder, bomb materials, and a wig as a disguise for co-conspirator Eric Everett Svelmoe, who planted the bomb. The gasoline bomb was placed at the premises but failed to detonate, as the fuse was blown out by wind.

Sullenger and her husband both pleaded guilty to conspiring to damage the Alvarado Medical Center abortion clinic and publicly apologized for their involvement. Sullenger's husband was sentenced to 18 months, and she was sentenced to three years by US District Judge Earl B. Gillam. Her sentence was scheduled to begin after her husband's ended so that one of them could stay at home with their daughters, then four and six years old. Sullenger served two years in U.S. federal prison and was released in April 1990.

Following completion of her sentence, Sullenger taught children at a Christian school for seven years. She was also elected to the Central Committee of the 75th District of the San Diego Republican Party.

=== Wichita and Operation Rescue ===
In 2003, Sullenger moved to Wichita, Kansas, where she began serving as a senior policy advisor for Operation Rescue under Troy Newman. With Newman she wrote the books Their Blood Cries Out! and Abortion Free. In 2003 she and Newman issued a statement upon the execution of Paul Jennings Hill, alleging that a judge did not allow Hill to mount the defense of his choosing and thereby denied him due process.

Sullenger was in communication with Scott Roeder, the man who assassinated abortion provider George Tiller in 2009. Sullenger initially denied any contact with Roeder. After Sullenger's phone number was discovered on the dashboard of Roeder's car, she admitted that she had informed Roeder of Tiller's scheduled court dates. Roeder also said that Sullenger had been present at two meetings with Newman where Roeder asked about "justifiable" homicide.
