= Albin Rhomberg =

American activist

Albin Rhomberg is an American anti-abortion activist and physicist based in Sacramento, California.

In 1978, while Rhomberg was a graduate student at the University of California, San Diego, he joined students Susan Erzinger and Peggy Pattonin in refusing to pay a student registration fee that financed an insurance plan that had provisions for health services including pregnancy counseling and abortion. After the students were denied registration materials they filed a complaint in San Diego County Superior Court against the University's regents.

In 1982 Rhomberg broke into the Los Angeles County Coroner's office to photograph aborted fetuses who were seized during a raid on an abortion clinic, Inglewood Women's owned by Morton Barke. He later led pickets at abortion clinics in Sacramento and became director the Center for Documentation of the American Holocaust.

Rhomberg was among eight protesters who disrupted an ecumenical prayer service held as part of the inauguration of California Governor Pete Wilson on January 6, 1991. The protesters denounced Wilson's pro-choice stance at the Sacramento's Cathedral of the Blessed Sacrament and were placed under citizen's arrest before being booked at Sacramento County Jail. Rhomberg later sued Governor Wilson and others, alleging that his arrest violated his First and Fourth Amendment rights.

Rhomberg was campaign spokesman for California Proposition 85 in 2006. The proposition sought to require parental notification and a 48-hour waiting period for anyone under 18 seeking an abortion. During the campaign Rhomberg argued that telephone recordings created by Life Dynamics "prove pretty unequivocally that Planned Parenthood is protecting men who sexually abuse children." In 2008 he was a principal advisor for the California Proposition 4 campaign, which had the same goal. Both measures failed. In 2011 Rhomberg was the spokesperson for the Parental Notification Initiative Campaign.

Rhomberg currently serves on the board of the Center for Medical Progress along with David Daleiden and Troy Newman.
