= Dignity (Law & Order) =

2009 episode of Law & Order

- Law & Order episode
- Episode no.: Season 20; Episode 5
- Directed by: M.T. Adler
- Written by: Dick Wolf (creator); René Balcer (developer); Richard Sweren & Julie Martin (story)
- Original air date: October 23, 2009

Guest appearances
- Bill Sage as Kevin Morton; Christina Kirk; Colleen Werthmann; Deirdre O'Connell as Dr. Valerie Knight; Jessica Dickey; Katie Kreisler; Mark Blum; Michael Hollick as Minister; Richard Thomas as Roger Jenkins; Tracy Sallows

Episode chronology
← Previous "Reality Bites"	Next → "Human Flesh Search Engine"

"Dignity" is the fifth episode in the twentieth season of the American television series Law & Order. The episode revolves around the issue of abortion. The story was inspired by the killing of late term abortion provider George Tiller.

== Synopsis ==
Dr. Walter Benning, a late term abortion provider, is shot and killed in church during a Sunday service. He had been shot at the previous year by an anti-abortion radical. Detectives Kevin Bernard and Cyrus Lupo investigate the crime. During the investigation, a nurse at Benning's abortion clinic admits to providing illegal abortions. Bernard and Lupo debate the abortion issue, with Bernard claiming he is anti-abortion because he was born premature after his mother tried to force a miscarriage. Their investigation leads them to a pregnant woman, Blair Morton, who was scheduled to have an abortion with Benning because the child had Ehlers–Danlos syndrome. Blair's father, Kevin Morton, had called the clinic hoping to convince the doctor out of the abortion. Eventually, the killer, Wayne Grogan, is found and arrested. An anti-abortion attorney, Roger Jenkins, takes on his case. At the initial hearing, Jenkins says Grogan was acting in defense of a specific person, the baby of Blair Morton, as Kevin Morton had told Grogan he was trying to talk down the doctor. The judge approves the defense's request for the right to proceed with a justification defense and a trial by jury is set. The attorneys for the prosecution, Michael Cutter and Connie Rubirosa, argue about the issue; Cutter opposes legal abortion and Rubirosa supports it.

Rubirosa goes to find a nurse, Jennice Morrow, who abruptly quit her job at Benning's clinic. She reveals Benning had killed a live baby in a botched abortion. Rubirosa tells Jack McCoy and Cutter they are obligated to give the evidence to the defense as Brady material, but both McCoy and Cutter say it can wait.

At the trial, Kevin Morton testifies that he encountered Grogan before the murder. Next, another late-term abortion provider is called to the witness stand, where he says the law will not stop him and his colleagues from performing abortions. Jenkins summons a witness, Lisa Barnett, who was pressured to abort because the child would have been terminally ill, but decided against it. Grogan had seen the woman on a talk show before the crime and the defense claims it influenced his state of mind. Barnett gives her story of delivering her baby, who spent most of her 21-hour-long life "peacefully in my arms" and died "naturally...with dignity". Most members of the jury are moved to tears.

McCoy finds extremism on both sides after the testimony of the other late-term abortion provider. At this point Cutter fruitlessly tries to convince McCoy to accept a plea bargain for voluntary manslaughter, claiming Roe v. Wade, the United States Supreme Court case that legalized abortion in the U.S., needed "another look." Cutter also compares Grogan to John Brown. Rubirosa reveals she handed over the evidence to the defense, saying she could not violate her personal ethics.

The next day the defense calls Morrow; she details how Benning asked the patient if he should complete the abortion even though the baby was alive, and the patient consented.

On the third day, Jenkins shows the jury a picture of Morton's newborn grandson, saying the baby would be dead if not for Grogan. Cutter begins to show the jury Benning's wallet, containing pictures of his family stained with blood, but instead says there has been too much "heartbreaking testimony". Instead, he declares that the issue of abortion goes to the core of the human person, saying humans are united in the belief that every life has dignity, which is why the violence of Grogan's act should be condemned. The jury finds Grogan guilty of first-degree murder.

After the trial, Rubirosa requests to be transferred to another division. The episode ends as McCoy muses that people should be consistent; he expected that "pro-lifers would oppose capital punishment" and human rights activists would claim rights for the unborn. He concludes that it's a "messy world."

== Reception ==
The episode was praised on the anti-abortion blogosphere, which had condemned the murder of George Tiller but appreciated the episode's handling of the abortion issue as a whole. Dave Andrusko of the National Right to Life Committee wrote about the realistic, human portrayal of those involved.

However, the episode was condemned by supporters of abortion rights including Kate Harding of Salon.com.
