= Eugene Gu =

American physician-scientist

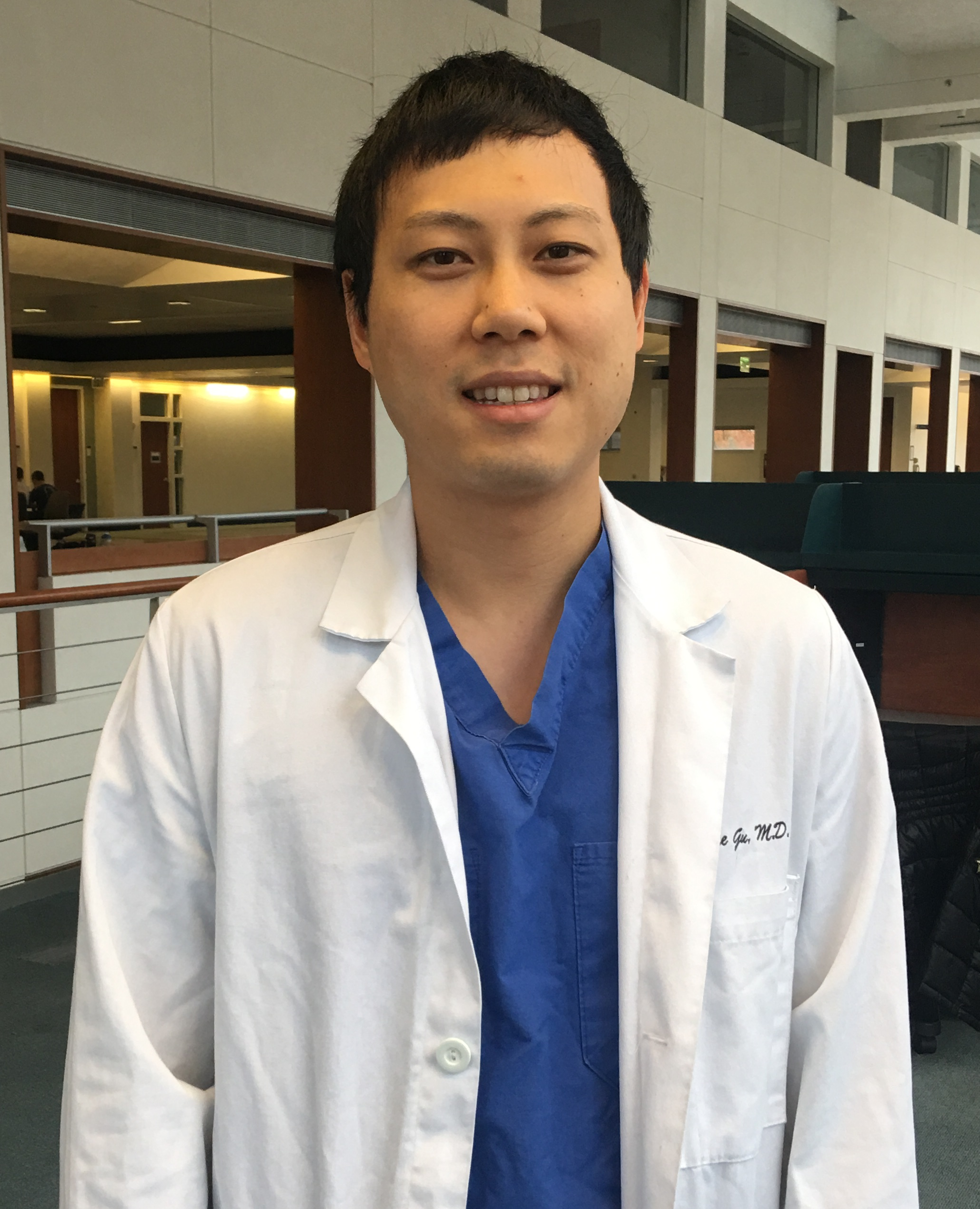
- Born: San Francisco, California, U.S.
- Education: Stanford University (BS); Duke University (MD)

Eugene Gu
- Traditional Chinese: 顧優靜
- Simplified Chinese: 顾优静
Transcriptions
Standard Mandarin
- Hanyu Pinyin: Gù Yōujìng

Eugene Gu is an American physician and social media personality. While he was in medical school, he founded a company called Ganogen to develop methods to use fetal tissue implants in organ transplantation. Work at Ganogen had ceased when he started his residency in 2015, but in 2016 he was subpoenaed as CEO of the company by the United States House Select Investigative Panel on Planned Parenthood following the Planned Parenthood 2015 undercover videos controversy.

Gu was one of a group of Twitter users blocked by Donald Trump who sued the President for violating their first amendment rights in Knight First Amendment Institute v. Trump, and won a declaratory judgment in May 2018.

== Education and training ==
Gu earned his undergraduate degree from Stanford University in 2008 in biology then earned his M.D. from Duke University School of Medicine in 2015.

== Career ==
While he was in medical school, Gu was awarded a Howard Hughes Medical Institute fellowship to perform research at the Stanford University School of Medicine. He wanted to see if organs from a fetus might be able to adapt to the immune system of a host into which it was transplanted; as a first step he transplanted human fetal hearts and kidneys into immunocompromised rats.

In 2012 Gu and Nick K. Chang, who had also gone to Stanford and was a Duke medical student, founded Ganogen, Inc., as a vehicle to further develop these methods. Gu put the work on hold when he started his residency, and took down the company's website after he was harassed in the wake of the Planned Parenthood 2015 undercover videos controversy. He had decided in early 2016 to convert the company to nonprofit. Gu put the company's website back up when he learned he had been subpoenaed by Congress in March 2016.

In March 2016, Gu, in his role as CEO of Ganogen, was subpoenaed by the United States House Select Investigative Panel on Planned Parenthood that was created in response to the Planned Parenthood 2015 undercover videos controversy, to testify about his research involving human fetal tissue. Gu has since spoken out about what he perceives to be the unfair treatment and intimidation of researchers and physicians by the panel, which included the panel releasing the names, addresses, and contact information of people who work with fetal tissue. Gu was recognized by the Union of Concerned Scientists for his response to the panel investigation and criticism from anti-abortion protestors.

He started a surgical residency at Vanderbilt University Medical Center in 2015. Vanderbilt put Gu on administrative leave for two weeks in November 2017, and placed him on probation until March 2018. Gu said this was due to his tweets opposing white supremacy; Vanderbilt was unable to comment on personnel matters but stated that the leave was based on Vanderbilt's policies, including those concerning use of social media.

Gu received notice from Vanderbilt in May 2018 confirming that his residency contract would not be renewed after the third year of what is usually a five-year residency; the fourth year would have started on July 1, 2018. In a letter addressed to Gu, VUMC cited performance issues—as it did when he was placed on leave. A May 17 letter to Gu from VUMC General Counsel Michael Regier, which was obtained by the Duke Chronicle, cited "lack of sufficient improvement in performance and conduct in key areas."

He has used his position as a physician to assist in his activist efforts such as with cannabis legalization.

== Twitter ==
Gu was noted for having a vocal presence on the site Twitter, where he advocated for social justice causes, and for his critical commentary of then-U.S. president Donald Trump. Gu was one of seven Twitter users who filed a lawsuit against U.S. President Donald Trump in July 2017 after being blocked from Trump's personal @realDonaldTrump account in the case Knight First Amendment Institute v. Trump, arguing that the block violated his rights under the First Amendment. The case was decided in the plaintiffs' favor on May 23, 2018. Gu's use of Twitter made him the target of harassment by Donald Trump supporters as well as brought him into conflict with his employers and other Twitter users.
