= United States House Select Investigative Panel on Planned Parenthood =

The United States House Committee on Energy and Commerce Select Investigative Panel on Planned Parenthood was a select subcommittee of the United States House of Representatives. Following the 2015 release of undercover videos filmed by The Center for Medical Progress, an anti-abortion group, purporting to show Planned Parenthood engaging in the sale of tissue from aborted fetuses, John Boehner, the Speaker of the House, announced in September 2015 that he was considering forming a select committee to investigate Planned Parenthood. The committee fell under the jurisdiction of the House Energy and Commerce Committee. The House approved the committee on October 7, 2015, by a party-line vote of 242–189, with all but one member of the Republican Party supporting the committee and only two members of the Democratic Party voting in favor of its creation.

On October 23, Boehner announced that the committee would be led by Representative Marsha Blackburn of Tennessee, and would also include Joe Pitts of Pennsylvania, Diane Black of Tennessee, Larry Bucshon of Indiana, Sean Duffy of Wisconsin, Andy Harris of Maryland, Vicky Hartzler of Missouri, and Mia Love of Utah. Democrats, who claim that the videos are edited to be purposefully misleading, considered boycotting the committee, citing the politicized nature of the United States House Select Committee on Benghazi. Instead, they chose to participate, naming Jan Schakowsky of Illinois as the Ranking Member, and also naming Jackie Speier of California, Jerrold Nadler of New York, Diana DeGette of Colorado, Suzan DelBene of Washington, and Bonnie Watson Coleman of New Jersey.

The Select Investigative Panel released its final report on December 30, 2016. It recommended that "the National Institutes of Health be required to stop funding fetal tissue research, and that the huge health provider Planned Parenthood be stripped of U.S. funding."

According to Science, the report contained inaccuracies. Democratic members of the panel — who had not been permitted to read, respond to, or vote on the final report — released an alternate report, criticizing the accuracy and tactics of the report. A Planned Parenthood spokesperson described the report as "a partisan attack" and noted that 13 state-level investigations and other congressional inquiries had found no wrongdoing. The Washington Post, New York Magazine and Los Angeles Times described the panel's inquiry as a "witch hunt" and criticized both its findings and tactics in editorials.

== Members, 114th Congress ==
| Majority | Minority |
|---|---|
| Marsha Blackburn, Tennessee, Chairman; Joe Pitts, Pennsylvania; Diane Black, Tennessee; Larry Bucshon, Indiana; Sean Duffy, Wisconsin; Andy Harris, Maryland; Vicky Hartzler, Missouri; Mia Love, Utah | Jan Schakowsky, Illinois, Ranking Member; Jackie Speier, California; Jerrold Nadler, New York; Diana DeGette, Colorado; Suzan DelBene, Washington; Bonnie Watson Coleman, New Jersey |
Ex officio
| Fred Upton, Michigan | Frank Pallone, New Jersey |
