= Murder of George Tiller =

2009 shooting in Wichita, Kansas, US

Coordinates: 37°42′28″N 97°14′56″W

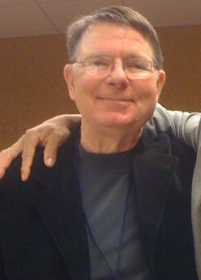
- Tiller in 2009
- Location: Foyer of Reformation; Lutheran Church; 7601 East 13th Street; Wichita, Kansas
- Date: May 31, 2009; 17 years ago c. 10:00 a.m. (UTC-6)
- Attack type: Shooting
- Victims: George Tiller, M.D.
- Perpetrator: Scott Philip Roeder
- Motive: Anti-abortion violence
- Verdict: Guilty on all counts
- Convictions: First degree murder, aggravated assault (x2)
- Sentence: Life in prison with the possibility of parole after 25 years, plus two years

On May 31, 2009, George Tiller, an American physician from Wichita, Kansas, who was one of the few doctors in the United States to perform late terminations of pregnancy, was murdered by Scott Roeder, an anti-abortion extremist. Tiller was shot to death at pointblank range during a Sunday morning service at his church, Reformation Lutheran Church, where he was serving as an usher. Tiller had previously survived a murder attempt in 1993 when Shelley Shannon shot him in the arms.

Roeder was arrested within three hours of the shooting and charged with first-degree murder and related crimes two days later. In November 2009, Roeder publicly confessed to the killing, telling the Associated Press that he had shot Tiller because "preborn children's lives were in imminent danger". Roeder was found guilty of first-degree murder and two counts of aggravated assault on January 29, 2010, and sentenced on April 1, 2010, to life imprisonment without any chance of parole for 50 years. This sentence was later reduced to allow for the possibility of parole after serving 25 years.

== Shooting and aftermath ==
George Tiller was shot dead on May 31, 2009, during worship services at the Reformation Lutheran Church in Wichita, where he was serving as an usher. The church is a congregation of the Evangelical Lutheran Church in America. Tiller was shot in the head at point blank range; he was wearing body armor, as he had been since 1998, when the FBI told him he was being targeted by anti-abortion militants. After threatening two others who tried to prevent his departure, the gunman fled in a car. Witnesses described the vehicle as a powder-blue 1993 Ford Taurus.

Calling the murder "an abhorrent act of violence", U.S. attorney general Eric Holder announced,

Federal law enforcement is coordinating with local law enforcement officials in Kansas on the investigation of this crime, and I have directed the United States Marshals Service to offer protection to other appropriate people and facilities around the nation.

Wichita had no abortion provider until 2013, when Trust Women Foundation opened a clinic in the city.

== Perpetrator ==
Scott Philip Roeder
- Roeder in the late 1990s, after his arrest for a parole violation
- Born: February 25, 1958 (age 68); Merriam, Kansas, U.S.
- Status: Incarcerated
- Motive: Anti-abortion extremism
- Convictions: Premeditated first degree murder Aggravated assault (2 counts)
- Penalty: 50 years to life; commuted to 25 years to life

Details
- Victims: George Tiller, 67
- Date: May 31, 2009
- Country: United States
- Location: Wichita, Kansas
- Weapon: Pistol
- Imprisoned at: Hutchinson Correctional Facility

Scott Philip Roeder (born February 25, 1958), who was from Merriam, Kansas, was arrested in Gardner, Kansas, 170 miles (270 km) away in the Kansas City metropolitan area three hours after the shooting. He was charged on June 2, 2009, with first-degree murder and two counts of aggravated assault. Roeder was formally charged before a Sedgwick County district judge on June 2. He said very little during the hearing, where he asked for a public defender and did not enter a plea.

Prosecutors said the killing did not meet Kansas' standards for capital murder, which would have carried a possible death sentence. Prior to the shooting, Roeder was not among the people monitored as potential threats by some abortion rights groups, including the state chapter of the National Organization for Women. It has been reported that neither the FBI nor local police arrested him in the days leading up to the murder despite reports and evidence offered to both that he vandalized a women's clinic the week before and the day before.

In a telephone call to the press from prison, Roeder admitted that he had shot and killed Tiller, and declared that he felt no remorse.

=== Known employment and psychiatric histories ===
In the six months before Roeder's arrest, he said, he had worked for an airport shuttle service, a party-rental shop, a convenience store and a property management enterprise.

After his arrest, Roeder's ex-wife, Lindsey Roeder, claimed that Roeder had been mentally ill and that at about the age of 20 he was diagnosed with possible schizophrenia, but she offered her own diagnosis of bipolar disorder. Roeder claimed to be the father of a young child and asked for time for visitation, but the mother of that child did not wish such visitation. The 2005 Pennsylvania family court which ruled on Roeder's custody petition regarding a daughter born in 2002 took formal notice that Roeder had been diagnosed with possible schizophrenia and was not on medication.

The Associated Press quoted Roeder's brother, David, who said that Scott had had mental illness from time to time:

However, none of us ever saw Scott as a person capable of or willing to take another person's life. Our deepest regrets, prayers and sympathy go out to the Tiller family during this terrible time.

=== Anti-government activism ===
Roeder had been a member of the anti-government Montana Freemen group. He was stopped in Topeka, Kansas, in April 1996 while displaying a placard reading "Sovereign Citizen" in lieu of a license plate. He had no driver's license, vehicle registration or proof of insurance. Police officers searching his car discovered explosive charges, a fuse cord, a pound of gunpowder and nine-volt batteries in the trunk. He was charged, represented by a public defender, convicted in June of all four counts and sentenced to 24 months probation. In July 1997, his probation was revoked for failure to pay taxes and provide his social security number to his employer as well as other probation violations. He was sentenced to 16 months in prison to be followed by 24 months parole supervision. He filed notice of appeal and was represented by a state-funded appellate attorney who challenged the basis of the original search that found the bomb components. The Kansas Court of Appeals overturned this conviction in March 1998, ruling that the search of Roeder's car had been illegal and remanded the case to the trial court. Roeder was released after serving eight months.

According to the Anti-Defamation League (ADL), Roeder belonged to the sovereign citizen movement, which believes that virtually all existing government in the United States is illegitimate. The ADL's National Director Abraham Foxman stated that "Roeder's attachment to extreme causes extended beyond anti-abortion extremism. His extremism cross-pollinated between anti-government extremism and anti-abortion activism and led to violence and murder."

After being charged with murder, Roeder frequently called an Associated Press reporter from the county jail. He complained about being treated like a criminal and about his having been characterized in other media as having been anti-government. Roeder told the reporter, "I want people to stop and think: It is not anti-government, it is anti-corrupt-government."

=== Lindsey Roeder statements ===
Lindsey and Scott Roeder were married in 1986, and were together for ten years. Immediately after his 2009 arrest, she stated that the explosives which led to his 1996 arrest had been intended for detonation at an abortion clinic.

On June 2, 2009, Lindsey Roeder gave an interview to Anderson Cooper of CNN about when and why her husband became radicalized:

It was about 1991–92 when he basically couldn't cope with everyday life. He couldn't make ends meet, he couldn't pay the bills and didn't know why he couldn't do that. And someone told him that if he didn't pay his federal taxes, if those taxes were left in his check, he could make ends meet. And then he started investigating that and someone told him that it wasn't ratified properly in the Constitution, that it was illegal. And he went from there and got into the anti-government, got into the militia, got into the Freeman, and along those lines anti-abortion issues came up and he started becoming very religious in the sense that he finally – he was reading the Bible. But then, after we were divorced, his religion took on a whole new right wing of itself.

=== Anti-abortion militancy ===
David Leach, publisher of Prayer & Action News, a magazine that opines that the killing of abortion providers would be justifiable homicide, told reporters that he and Roeder had met once in the late 1990s and that Roeder at that time had authored contributions to Leach's publication. Leach published the Army of God manual, which advocates the killing of the providers of abortion and contains bomb-making instructions, in the January 1996 issue of his magazine. A Kansas acquaintance of Roeder's, Regina Dinwiddie, told a reporter after Tiller's murder (speaking of Roeder), "I know that he believed in justifiable homicide." Dinwiddie, an anti-abortion militant featured in the 2000 HBO documentary Soldiers in the Army of God, added that she had observed Roeder in 1996 enter Kansas City Planned Parenthood's abortion clinic and ask to talk to the physician there; after staring at him for nearly a minute, Roeder said, "I've seen you now," before turning and walking away.

Roeder's former roommate of two years, Eddie Ebecher, who had met Roeder through the Freemen movement in the 1990s, told a reporter after Tiller's murder that he and Roeder had considered themselves members of the Army of God. Ebecher said Roeder was obsessed with Tiller and discussed killing him, but that Ebecher warned him not to do so. Ebecher, who went by the nom de guerre "Wolfgang Anacon," added that he believed Roeder held "high moral convictions in order to carry out this act. I feel that Scott had a burden for all the children being murdered."

In 2007, someone who identified himself as Scott Roeder posted on the website of the anti-abortion group Operation Rescue that "Tiller is the concentration camp 'Mengele' of our day and needs to be stopped before he and those who protect him bring judgment upon our nation." This was reported by the ADL's Center on Extremism, noting that Roeder called for "the closing of his death camp." After Tiller's murder, officials from Operation Rescue, which had long opposed Tiller's abortion practices but denounced his shooting, said Roeder was not a contributor or member of the group. The cell phone number for Operation Rescue's senior policy advisor, convicted clinic bomb plotter Cheryl Sullenger, was found on the dashboard of Scott Roeder's car. At first, Sullenger denied any contact with Roeder, saying that her phone number is freely available online. Then, she revised her statements, indicating that Roeder's interest was in court hearings involving Tiller.

He would call and say, "When does court start? When's the next hearing?" I was polite enough to give him the information. I had no reason not to. Who knew? Who knew, you know what I mean?

Roeder reportedly attended the 2009 trial in which Tiller was acquitted of violating state abortion laws; Roeder called the trial "a sham" and felt the justice system failed in letting Tiller go free. On May 30, one day before Tiller was killed, a worker at a Kansas City clinic told the Federal Bureau of Investigation that Roeder had tried gluing the locks of the clinic shut, something Roeder was suspected of doing there before years earlier. The Kansas City Star reported that a man of Roeder's description had glued the locks shut at the Central Family Medicine clinic in Kansas City on May 23 and 30.

== Reactions to Tiller's killing ==
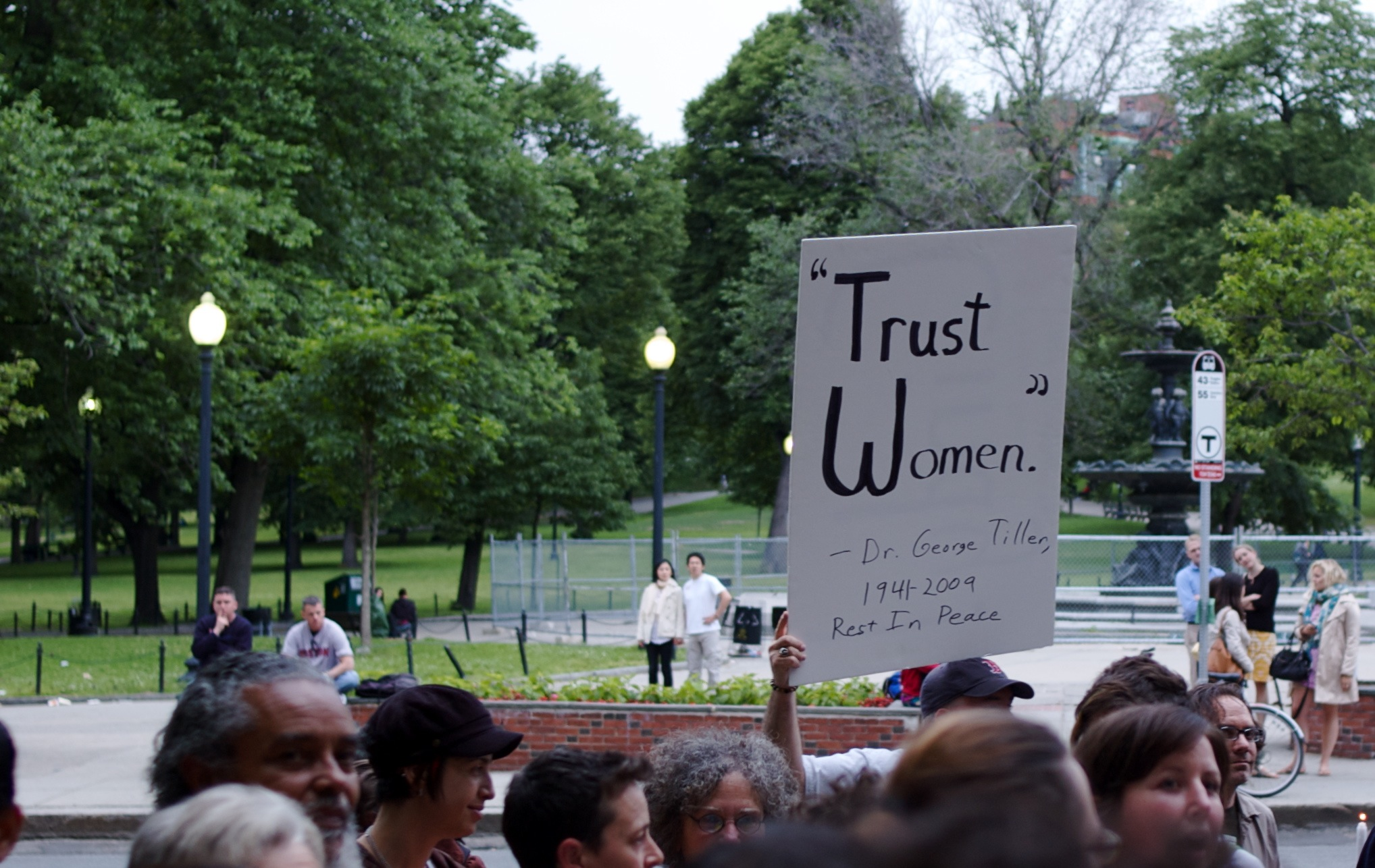
A June 1, 2009, candlelight vigil in Boston, Massachusetts, for George Tiller

President Barack Obama said, "I am shocked and outraged by the murder of Dr. George Tiller as he attended church services this morning. However profound our differences as Americans over difficult issues such as abortion, they cannot be resolved by heinous acts of violence."

A number of other organizations also condemned the murder. Cardinal Justin Rigali of the U.S. Conference of Catholic Bishops stated,

Our bishops' conference and all its members have repeatedly and publicly denounced all forms of violence in our society, including abortion as well as the misguided resort to violence by anyone opposed to abortion. Such killing is the opposite of everything we stand for, and everything we want our culture to stand for: respect for the life of each and every human being from its beginning to its natural end. We pray for Dr. Tiller and his family.

Tony Perkins, President of the Family Research Council, condemned the killing, saying,

We are stunned at today's news. As Christians we pray and look toward the end of all violence and for the saving of souls, not the taking of human life. George Tiller was a man who we publicly sought to stop through legal and peaceful means. We strongly condemn the actions taken today by this vigilante killer and we pray for the Tiller family and for the nation that we might once again be a nation that values all human life, both born and unborn.

The American Jewish Congress stated in a press release that Tiller's murder "exemplifies criminal anarchy, not legitimate protest. Dr. Tiller's murder was not just a terrible crime against an individual. It was also a crime against our democracy... Murder is not a debating technique. It is never, and must never be, an accepted way of advancing a point of view." The National Council of Jewish Women also condemned the murder, with President Nancy Ratzan stating that "Dr. Tiller devoted his life to ensuring that women did indeed have choices when confronted with an unintended or untenable pregnancy. His murder – his assassination – is intended to terrorize not only all involved with providing abortions but anyone even remotely associated with abortion rights." The Religious Action Center of Reform Judaism also condemned Tiller's murder.

Other reactions included:

- David N. O'Steen, director the National Right to Life Committee released this statement on May 31, 2009:

National Right to Life extends its sympathies to Dr. Tiller's family over this loss of life. Further, the National Right to Life Committee unequivocally condemns any such acts of violence regardless of motivation. The pro-life movement works to protect the right to life and increase respect for human life. The unlawful use of violence is directly contrary to that goal.

- Operation Rescue released this statement on May 31, 2009:

We are shocked at this morning's disturbing news that Mr. Tiller was gunned down. Operation Rescue has worked for years through peaceful, legal means, and through the proper channels to see him brought to justice. We denounce vigilantism and the cowardly act that took place this morning. We pray for Mr. Tiller's family that they will find comfort and healing that can only be found in Jesus Christ.

- Mary Kay Culp, director of Kansans for Life, said that the organization "deplores the murder of Dr. George Tiller, and we wish to express our deep and sincere sympathy to his family and friends. We value life, completely deplore violence, and are shocked and very upset by what happened in Wichita today."
- Randall Terry, the founder of Operation Rescue, condemned the victim rather than the murderer:

George Tiller was a mass-murderer. We grieve for him that he did not have time to properly prepare his soul to face God. I am more concerned that the Obama Administration will use Tiller's killing to intimidate pro-lifers into surrendering our most effective rhetoric and actions. Abortion is still murder. And we still must call abortion by its proper name; murder. Those men and women who slaughter the unborn are murderers according to the Law of God. We must continue to expose them in our communities and peacefully protest them at their offices and homes, and yes, even their churches.

- Wiley Drake, vice-presidential candidate for the America's Independent Party ticket in 2008 and the second vice president of the Southern Baptist Convention in 2006–2007, asked on his radio show, "Would you have rejoiced when Adolf Hitler died during the war? ... I would have said, 'Amen! Praise the Lord! Hallelujah! I'm glad he's dead.' This man, George Tiller, was far greater in his atrocities than Adolf Hitler, so I am happy; I am glad that he is dead."
- Anti-abortion militants The Army of God, a group that promotes "leaderless resistance" as its organizing principle, issued a statement calling Tiller's presumed killer an "American hero." Donald Spitz from that group stated, "I believe what he (Scott Roeder) did was justified manslaughter to save those unborn children from the baby murderer Dr. Tiller".
- Pointing out what he saw as a philosophical problem with "non-violent" right-to-lifism, Reason columnist Jacob Sullum wrote "if you honestly believe abortion is the murder of helpless children, it's hard to see why using deadly force against those who carry it out is immoral, especially since the government refuses to act." William Saletan, Jacob Appel, Colby Cosh, and Damon Linker similarly questioned the anti-abortion movement's consistency in condemning Tiller's murder.

Some commentators argued that the treatment of the murder, by both the White House and the media, was absurdly disproportionate. The day after the murder, two soldiers were attacked at an Army recruiting center in Little Rock, Arkansas: one died; the other suffered injuries. Comparing this incident with the Tiller murder, Michelle Malkin wrote,

Tiller's suspected murderer, Scott Roeder, was white, Christian, anti-government, and anti-abortion. The gunman in the military recruiting center attack, Abdul Hakim Mujahid Muhammad, was black, a Muslim convert, anti-military, and anti-American. Both crimes are despicable, cowardly acts of domestic terrorism. But the disparate treatment of the two brutal cases by both the White House and the media is striking.

James Taranto of The Wall Street Journal found fault with this view, claiming that its proponents failed to acknowledge that the crimes were different in nature and, therefore, in public import. Although equally "abhorrent",

in the hierarchy of public significance, assassinations rank higher than hate crimes, which in turn rank higher than "ordinary" murders. The murder of Martin Luther King was bigger news, and is a more important part of history, than any individual lynching, even though both were atrocious crimes spurred by similar ideological motives.

Taranto also felt that the President's sentiments on the cases could be read quite differently: although his condemnation of the Tiller killing was worded far more strongly, it was only to the soldiers and their kin that condolences and sympathy were proffered, in spite of the fact that Tiller's wife was present at her husband's death. "If anything", Taranto opined, the statement was somewhat "cowardly", and the pains to which he went to appease the anti-abortion movement were duly noted.

Another response to Malkin's charge of "disparate treatment of the two brutal cases" has been that the true disparity was the mass media's downplaying of Roeder's Christianity. In this view, major media outlets "relegate Mr. Roeder's religious motivation to the margins, while all play up Mr. Muhammad's connections to Islam."

Fox News Channel commentator Bill O'Reilly has also been accused of demonizing Tiller. O'Reilly was found to have mentioned Tiller by name on The O'Reilly Factor, his show on the Fox News Channel, 42 separate times prior to Tiller's death, referring to him specifically as a "baby killer" in 24 instances. O'Reilly said he was not responsible for Tiller's death and defended his campaign against Tiller, saying:

When I heard about Tiller's murder, I knew pro-abortion zealots and Fox News haters would attempt to blame us for the crime, and that's exactly what has happened. [...] Every single thing we said about Tiller was true, and my analysis was based on those facts. [...] Now, it's clear that the far left is exploiting — exploiting — the death of the doctor. Those vicious individuals want to stifle any criticism of people like Tiller. That — and hating Fox News — is the real agenda here.

In 2009, Congressman Keith Ellison said, "There is no room in America to 'justify' murder in the name of ideological differences. I condemn the act committed against Dr. Tiller as well as those who take comfort from his death."

On June 9, U.S. Representative Louise Slaughter sponsored a House resolution condemning the murder of Tiller, which was unanimously passed.

Several anti-abortion groups claimed to have received death threats in the aftermath of the shooting, some of them threatening "vengeance" against the anti-abortion movement.

Although most anti-abortion activists avoided Tiller's funeral, 17 members from the Westboro Baptist Church picketed the funeral. The church members held signs that read "God sent the shooter", "Abortion is bloody murder", and "Baby Killer in Hell".

== Trial of Scott Roeder ==
On June 2, 2009, the District Attorney of the 18th Judicial District of the State of Kansas filed charges on behalf of the State of Kansas against Scott Roeder consisting of one count first-degree murder and two counts of aggravated assault. A preliminary hearing was held in Wichita on July 28, 2009.

Judge Warren Wilbert ruled on January 8, 2010, that he would allow Roeder's defense team to argue for a voluntary manslaughter conviction, which in Kansas is defined as killing with "an unreasonable but honest belief that circumstances existed that justified deadly force."

Jury selection was scheduled to begin Monday, January 11, 2010, but was delayed after prosecutors challenged the judge's decision to allow the defense to build a case for a lesser charge. Selection proceedings began in closed session on January 12, 2010. Judge Wilbert had ordered jury selection closed to the public and press citing fears jurors would be less than truthful if questioned in public. The Kansas State Supreme Court overturned his order, although parts of the questions to individual jurors remained private.

The court heard opening statements on January 22, 2010.

The defense had asked the court to hear the testimony of the former Kansas Attorney General Phill Kline and Barry Disney, a current member of that office. Both had previously tried to convict Tiller of providing illegal late-term abortions. The judge, upon previewing the testimony of Kline, disallowed his testimony pointing out such abortions are legal in Kansas and citing the possibility of prejudicing the jury.

Scott Roeder took the stand in his own defense on January 28, 2010. At the outset, he admitted to killing Tiller, defending his act as an attempt to save unborn children and giving his views on abortion. Under questioning by his attorney, he attempted to describe abortion practices in detail but was repeatedly halted by objections based on his lack of medical expertise.

Following Roeder's testimony on the stand, Judge Wilbert ruled that the jury would not have the voluntary manslaughter option.

On January 29, 2010, the jury returned a verdict of guilty on all three charges after less than 40 minutes of deliberation. Roeder's attorneys appealed the conviction, arguing that the jury should have been given the voluntary manslaughter option. The Kansas Supreme Court heard the appeal on January 29, 2014, and rejected it, upholding Roeder's conviction, on October 24, 2014.

On April 1, 2010, in Wichita, Kansas, Sedgwick County District Judge Warren Wilbert sentenced Roeder to a "Hard 50", meaning life in prison with no possibility of parole for 50 years, for the murder of Tiller, the maximum sentence available in Kansas, plus an additional two years for the two counts of aggravated assault. Since then, the U.S. Supreme Court has altered the rules regarding when mandatory minimum sentences such as the "Hard 50" may be imposed, and on October 24, 2014, the Kansas Supreme Court called for re-sentencing. According to the U.S. Supreme Court's decision, the "hard 50" can still be imposed, but the finding that the circumstances of the crime justify the sentence must be made by a jury, rather than by the judge.

On November 23, 2016, Roeder was re-sentenced to life in prison but is now eligible to apply for parole after serving 25 years rather than after 50 years. As before, besides the sentence for murder, Roeder was also sentenced to two additional years for aggravated assault because he had threatened to shoot two church ushers while fleeing the murder. Sedgwick County District Attorney Marc Bennett said that prosecutors decided not to convene a new jury or ask for the reinstatement of the "hard 50", because of Roeder's age, his worsening health, and the likelihood that he will die in prison before the 25 years pass. The prosecutors also consulted Tiller's family, who said that they were comfortable with the reduction.

=== Further threats from prison ===
In 2013, Roeder was placed in solitary confinement for 45 days for issuing further threats of violence during a telephone interview with anti-abortion activist David Leach. He referenced the work of Julie Burkhart, Founder and CEO of Trust Women Foundation to open an abortion providing facility in Wichita.

== Aftermath ==
The National Network of Abortion Funds established the George Tiller Memorial Abortion Fund.

Tiller's murder was covered by and alluded to in film and television from 2013 documentary After Tiller, which follows the lives of four other late-term abortion providers after Tiller's murder, to the anti-abortion movie Unplanned (2019). It also inspired an episode of the television legal drama Law & Order, "Dignity". In that episode, an anti-abortion activist murdered a doctor who performed late-term abortions in New York. The defense said it was a justifiable homicide, since the murderer did it to prevent the doctor from performing a late-term abortion on a specific woman; hence, he did it in defense of another human being. In the end, the jury decided that the defendant was guilty of murder in the first degree. The episode's reception was polarized: the anti-abortion blogosphere appreciated the episode's handling of the abortion issue as a whole, while many pro-abortion rights sources condemned the episode.
