= David Leach (activist) =

American anti-abortion activist

Dave Leach
- Born: Dave Francis Leach; November 12, 1945 (age 80); Iowa City, Iowa
- Other names: Uncle Ed; Secretary General of the Army of God
- Education: Drake University (music education, 1967)
- Occupations: Owner/Instructor at Family Music Center in Des Moines, Iowa, 1999–present Writer/Editor of Prayer & Action News magazine, 1989–present Broadcaster of The Uncle Ed Show on Public-access television

David Francis Leach is an American anti-abortion activist from Des Moines, Iowa. He publishes the Prayer & Action News quarterly newsletter (1989–present), and edits the website The Partnership Machine (1998–present) which covers social issues including abortion, politics, religion, immigration, divorce, sodomy, and education.

== Biography ==
Leach runs a Des Moines, Iowa music store, the Family Music Center. Leach and his wife Dorothy have music degrees and have taught since 1974 on several instruments.

He has run for the Iowa General Assembly six times and lost, in his first attempt (1986) as a Democrat and in the rest (1988, 1990, 2000, 2002, 2010) as a Republican. He was a candidate for the Iowa legislature again in 2012 but lost in the Republican primary election. Since 1995 Leach has operated a public-access television show on cable called "The Uncle Ed Show" and he also worked as a journalist for the central Iowa newspaper Ankeny Today.. In 2011, Leach authored and self-published the book entitled Eternal Hell: Heaven's Loving Purpose (ISBN 978-1466371910).

== Activism ==
Leach's publications argue in favor of the doctrine of justifiable homicide in the case of abortion doctors. Leach wrote in a 2002 newsletter that violent acts against abortion clinic property in the defense of unborn children is justifiable, since the person reasonably believes the violence is absolutely necessary in order to prevent serious harm or death to innocents, and the violence should not considered a criminal offense if it can be proven that the person acted in the defense of others. He has also written a number of legal arguments including appellate and pro se trial briefs in support of what he calls the "Necessity Defense", in which necessity may be either a possible justification or an exculpation for breaking the law. Prayer & Action News also featured occasional contributions from Scott Roeder, the convicted killer in the assassination of George Tiller, a doctor in Wichita, Kansas who provided late term abortions. Leach, who described Roeder as "anti-government," said he stopped to see Roeder in Kansas prior to 2009, after visiting Shelley Shannon in prison. (Shannon was convicted in 1993 of shooting Tiller in both arms outside his clinic.) Leach also conducted a telephone interview with Roeder in April 2013. During this interview, Roeder issued further threats of violence, for which he was held in solitary confinement for 45 days.

In an interview with the Iowa Independent, Leach said that to call "...killing a killer a crime is too simplistic.

Indeed, 'taking the law into your own hands', as the idiom goes, is morally, legally, and spiritually dangerous territory. But to say it is never right or legal is ignorance of our own laws. Every state has some version of the Necessity Defense, which says if you break a law to save a life, it's not a crime. Taking dozens of lives by the cruelest devices, from burning to death in acid, to dismemberment, to Dr. Tiller's scissors in a baby's brain, as a single day's work for any abortionist.

Leach said when human law conflicts with God's Laws, "we ought to obey God rather than man", and that he will not "advocate" that anyone go out and kill someone who provides abortion care, but his "mind remains open on the question."

So while I am waiting for more dialogue, I must say that so far, the Bible discussion I have seen overwhelmingly supports anyone willing to sacrifice everything in order to physically stop an abortionist from killing thousands of babies.

Leach was fired in 1996 from his reporter job at Ankeny Today, after he reprinted 40 pages of the Army of God Manual in the January 1996 issue of his Prayer & Action News, which gave step-by-step instructions for making plastic explosives and fertilizer bombs. The publication also discussed strategies for disabling or destroying abortion clinics. At the time, he said he published the material because he feared it was about to be suppressed by a court. In 1994, United States Marshals were sent to guard the Des Moines office of Planned Parenthood. Officials said the step was taken partly because of concerns about Leach, after he had signed statements saying that Paul Jennings Hill and Michael F. Griffin could have been justified in killing abortion-providing doctors in Florida.

The manual begins with a "declaration of war" on abortion clinics and states, "The Editors of this manual hope and pray that the information contained herein will be useful to those who are committed to anti-abortion activism, and may perhaps provide the catalyst to inspire others to such a commitment." Under the heading "99 Covert Ways to Stop Abortion" the document details clandestine tactics activists can use to shut down abortion clinics. The "Revised and Expanded" third edition Epilogue contains a Declaration which concludes with a paragraph that supports murdering abortion providers, calling such murders justifiable homicide.

The manual had previously been published only anonymously, and mailed anonymously to anti-abortion leaders and news reporters. Leach's reprint of it was the first printing that was not anonymous. The introduction explained that Janet Reno's Virginia Grand Jury had, for a year, subpoenaed anti-abortion activists and "commanded" them to bring any copies they had of the Army of God Manual, which were then taken, which Leach alleged was treating the possession of the book as a crime. Leach wrote of the reprinting: "If owning a book is a crime, here I am; prosecute me." Within days after reprints went in the mail, the Virginia Grand Jury was disbanded.

In 1998 the fictional series Rescue Platoon, a story of a future, final war against abortion, was serialized on Leach's website. The story ends with the Army of God, following a violent battle, gaining the final victory. The story includes a depiction of the Army of God bombing a Florida abortion clinic.

In 2002 Mediacom, owner of the cable television station hosting Leach's program The Uncle Ed. Show. said that Leach would not be allowed to broadcast film of women entering a Planned Parenthood clinic here unless their faces were covered.

In April 2013, Leach posted a video to YouTube which included a recorded telephone conversation with Roeder, discussing the fact that Tiller's abortion clinic had been re-opened by another agency. Leach said:

If someone would shoot the new abortionists, like Scott [Roeder] shot George Tiller, ...hardly anyone will appreciate it but the babies, ... It will be a blessing to the babies. Everyone else will panic. Of all places to open up a killing office, to reopen the one office in the United States more notorious for decades than any other is an act of defiance against God and the last remaining reverence for human life.

During this telephone interview, Roeder issued further threats of anti-abortion violence, for which he was placed in solitary confinement for 45 days. His privileges were also reduced for an additional 60 days.
