= Planned Parenthood 2015 undercover videos controversy =

US abortion-related controversy

In 2015, an anti-abortion organization named the Center for Medical Progress (CMP) released several videos that had been secretly recorded. Members of the CMP posed as representatives of a biotechnology company in order to gain access to both meetings with abortion providers and abortion facilities. The videos showed how abortion providers made fetal tissue available to researchers, although no problems were found with the legality of the process. All of the videos were found to be altered, according to analysis by Fusion GPS and its co-founder Glenn R. Simpson, a former investigative reporter for The Wall Street Journal. The CMP disputed this finding, attributing the alterations to the editing out of "bathroom breaks and waiting periods". CMP had represented a longer version of the tapes as being "complete", as well as a shorter, edited version. The analysis by Fusion GPS concluded that the longer version was also edited, with skips and missing footage. Nonetheless, the videos attracted widespread media coverage; after the release of the first video, conservative lawmakers in Congress singled out Planned Parenthood and began to push bills that would strip the organization of federal family planning funding. No such attempts by Congress to cut federal family planning money from Planned Parenthood have become law. Conservative politicians in several states have also used this as an opportunity to cut or attempt to cut family planning funding at the state level.

Officials in twelve states initiated investigations into claims made by the videos, but none found Planned Parenthood clinics to have sold tissue for profit as alleged by CMP and other anti-abortion groups. An investigation by the U.S. House of Representatives Oversight and Government Reform Committee found no evidence of wrongdoing by Planned Parenthood. A select committee, the U.S. House Committee on Energy and Commerce Select Investigative Panel on Planned Parenthood, was formed to further investigate Planned Parenthood. The Republican-controlled Select Investigative Panel released its final report on December 30, 2016, recommending that Planned Parenthood be defunded. The report was heavily criticized as partisan and inaccurate by Democratic members of the committee, Planned Parenthood, and some news media.

In January 2016, a Texas grand jury chartered to investigate Planned Parenthood found no wrongdoing by Planned Parenthood but instead indicted CMP founder David Daleiden and member Sandra Merritt for creating and using false government IDs and attempting to purchase fetal tissue. The charges against Daleiden and Merritt in Texas were dismissed six months later on the grounds that the grand jury's indictment authority had extended only to Planned Parenthood. In March 2017, Daleiden and Merritt were charged with 15 felonies in the State of California – one for each of the people whom they had filmed without consent, and one for criminal conspiracy to invade privacy. In June 2017, all the invasion of privacy charges (but not that of conspiracy) were dismissed with leave to amend, but in July 2017, the State of California re-filed amended charges.

== CMP's videos ==
The CMP videos consisted of portions of secretly recorded, hours-long conversations between members of CMP and abortion providers. Members of CMP posed as representatives of a non-existent company called Biomax Procurement Services, presenting themselves as potential buyers of fetal tissue. CMP stated that it has "hundreds if not thousands of hours of recordings".

The videos were made over a period of 30 months, and were released approximately once per week to increase exposure, including media coverage, and to allow the public more time to consume and react to each video. Americans United for Life began working with CMP beginning in January 2015, providing them with advice. There were widespread protests at Planned Parenthood Federation of America (PPFA) affiliates. The debate over abortion was reinvigorated.

One of the videos includes an image of a stillborn fetus, published in the Daily Mail in January 2014, used without the permission of the woman in the photo, and in a way that falsely suggests that the stillborn was aborted.

=== Financial aspects ===
CMP alleged that the videos were evidence of Planned Parenthood engaging in the illegal sale of fetal tissue. Their dummy corporation Biomax offered one clinic US$1,600 for tissue, but the affiliate declined the offer. The New York Times has characterized the offer as an attempt to "trap the affiliate in the act of accepting a high payment for fetal tissue".

In a less-edited version of the first video, PPFA staff repeatedly state that the organization makes no money from tissue donations, and that the $30–100 charge only covers procurement costs. PPFA have said they may donate fetal tissue at the request of a patient, but such tissue is never sold. At one point in the video, a PPFA staffer states "nobody should be 'selling' tissue," and "that's just not the goal here."

According to several experts in the field, the money Planned Parenthood received for fetal tissue was too little to make any profit for Planned Parenthood and constituted reasonable compensation for the costs of procurement, as allowed by federal law. These experts included Sherilyn J. Sawyer, the director of Harvard University's and Brigham and Women's Hospital's biorepository; Jim Vaught, president of the International Society for Biological and Environmental Repositories and formerly the deputy director of the National Cancer Institute's (NCIs) Office of Biorepositories and Biospecimen Research; and Carolyn Compton, the chief medical and science officer of Arizona State University's National Biomarkers Development Alliance and a former director of biorepositories and biospecimen research at the NCI.

On October 13, 2015, Planned Parenthood announced it would no longer accept reimbursement for the costs of collecting and shipping fetal tissue to research labs. Citing an "anti-abortion agenda" by some in Congress, Planned Parenthood stated the move was designed to remove a reason for politically motivated attacks.

=== Alleged variation in abortion procedures ===
The CMP alleges that the videos show Planned Parenthood officials offering to make adjustments in the techniques used in abortions in order to acquire more intact fetal tissues and organs. Federal law prohibits changing from one abortion procedure to another procedure in order to obtain human tissue for medical research, as well as for delivering intact fetuses. Planned Parenthood spokespeople have responded to CMP's allegations by stating that the organization follows "all laws – period", and that accusations made in CMP's videos "are false".

=== Alleged lack of consent from donors ===
In the sixth video, Holly O'Donnell, an anti-abortion former StemExpress technician, says that she was told by her superiors to encourage women seeking abortions to sign the consent forms, and that even when women refused to sign the fetal organs and tissues were sometimes taken anyway. In the unedited first video, representatives state the donations are only made with the patient's consent. StemExpress, a supplier of biological specimens mostly stem cells for research, has "unequivocally" denied O'Donnell's allegation, stating that the video is "deceptively edited and falsely worded to suggest impropriety or illegality where none exists". Eric Ferrero, vice president of communication for the PPFA, noted that O'Donnell "has never worked for Planned Parenthood", and called her allegations "false and outrageous".

== Aftermath ==
The editorial board of The New York Times described CMP's actions as a "campaign of deception against Planned Parenthood", and wrote that the "video campaign is a dishonest attempt to make legal, voluntary and potentially lifesaving tissue donations appear nefarious and illegal". Supporters of Planned Parenthood have complained that the videos were "highly edited".

Cecile Richards, the president of Planned Parenthood, "personally [apologized] for the staff member's tone and statements", saying the videos were "unacceptable". Dawn Laguens, executive vice president of PPFA, stated: "The latest [fifth] tape has at least 20 substantial and unexplained edits. Previous tapes released by this extremist group were 'heavily edited' in order to distort what was actually said. These videos are intended to shock and deceive the public." In a letter to a Congressional committee, PPFA wrote: "A group of extremists who have intimidated women and doctors for years‍—‌in their agenda to ban abortion completely‍—‌are not 'documenting' misdeeds; they are trying to create them, quite unsuccessfully."

In response to Planned Parenthood, CMP stated that "we look forward to showing the public more clear evidence that Planned Parenthood routinely profits from the sale of baby parts and changes the abortion procedures it uses on pregnant women in order to do so".

=== Investigations ===
Responding to the videos and to CMP's allegations, three different Congressional committees, and officials in a number of states, launched investigations into Planned Parenthood's tissue collection activities. One Congressional committee asked to interview the filmed representatives to see whether the statements made in the videos are consistent with existing federal law.

On July 30, 2015, former Indiana Governor Mike Pence announced that the state's investigation did not find any evidence of wrongdoing in Planned Parenthood's handling of fetal tissue. In Massachusetts, where there is no fetal tissue and organ donation program, Attorney General Maura Healey found that aborted fetuses are disposed of properly in a report that "voiced strong support for" Planned Parenthood. In Florida, investigators from the Agency for Health Care Administration found on July 31, 2015 that three Planned Parenthood clinics were performing second-trimester abortions without the proper licenses, and that one clinic was failing to keep proper logs relating to fetal remains. Planned Parenthood rejected the findings.

Texas Governor Greg Abbott announced an investigation into practices in Texas, and said that the state would "expand its investigation" after the release of the second video, and Missouri Attorney General Chris Koster announced that his office would investigate Planned Parenthood for any potential wrongdoing at its clinics in that state. Investigations were also launched in Ohio, Kansas, Georgia, South Carolina, Mississippi, and Louisiana, with calls for the U.S. Justice Department to investigate.

At the local level, the Harris County district attorney launched a criminal investigation in conjunction with the Texas Rangers and the Houston Police Department after the fifth video was released showing a Planned Parenthood executive in that city.

Altogether, the videos prompted investigations in fifteen states, including Texas where one undercover recording operation took place; eight other states refused to investigate their Planned Parenthood clinics, including California and Colorado where other CMP recordings also occurred.

California Attorney General Kamala D. Harris announced an investigation into the CMP's practice of undercover recording.

Officials in Georgia, Indiana, Massachusetts, South Dakota, and Kansas investigated and failed to find any evidence of Planned Parenthood clinics breaking any state laws concerning the collection of fetal tissues. The state of Pennsylvania cleared Planned Parenthood of any wrongdoing. In September, the Missouri Attorney General found no evidence that the state's only clinic that provides abortion services mishandled fetal tissues. The report stated, "As a result of our investigation, the Office of the Missouri Attorney General has found no evidence that (Planned Parenthood) has engaged in unlawful disposal of fetal organs and tissue."

On October 8, 2015, Republican Representative Jason Chaffetz (Utah), chairman of the U.S. House Committee on Oversight and Government Reform, stated that the GOP investigation found no evidence of wrongdoing by Planned Parenthood.

On January 25, 2016, a Houston grand jury chartered to investigate Planned Parenthood, instead indicted Daleiden and another videographer, Sandra Merritt, for creating fake driver's licenses used as identification (a felony) and offering to purchase fetal tissue (a misdemeanor). On June 14, 2016, the misdemeanor charges concerning fetal tissue were dropped due to a technicality, and on July 26, 2016, the felony charges (related to false identification) were dismissed by a judge who ruled that the grand jury exceeded its authority by indicting Daleiden and Merritt when it was chartered only to investigate Planned Parenthood. On March 28, 2017, however, Daleiden and Merritt were charged with 15 felonies in the State of California – one for each of the people whom they had filmed without consent, and one for criminal conspiracy to invade privacy.

A select committee, the U.S. House Committee on Energy and Commerce Select Investigative Panel on Planned Parenthood, was formed to further investigate Planned Parenthood, with Congresswoman Marsha Blackburn serving as the chairman. On September 21, the panel voted 8–0 to recommend holding StemExpress in contempt of Congress for failure to comply with a subpoena. The six Democratic members of the panel walked out of the meeting in protest before the vote. The committee's final report recommended that "the National Institutes of Health be required to stop funding fetal tissue research, and that the huge health provider Planned Parenthood be stripped of U.S. funding." According to Science, the report contained multiple inaccuracies. Democratic members of the panel – who had not been permitted to read, respond to, or vote on the final report – released an alternate report, in which they criticized the committee for relying on "McCarthy-era tactics" and of relying on "unsourced, unverified documents" in writing the report. A Planned Parenthood spokesperson described the report as "nothing more than a partisan attack on Planned Parenthood and women's access to safe and legal abortion" and noted that 13 state-level investigations and other congressional inquiries had found no wrongdoing. The Washington Post, New York Magazine and Los Angeles Times described the panel's inquiry as a "witch hunt" and criticized both its findings and tactics in editorials.

=== Court orders ===
On July 31, 2015, the National Abortion Federation sued CMP and Daleiden. A Los Angeles judge placed a temporary restraining order on the release of further videos of employees of StemExpress, one company which Planned Parenthood does business with, based on California's anti-wiretapping law. The order also prohibited the group from disclosing names or addresses of National Abortion Federation members, or dates and locations of future meetings. The restraining order was later lifted, allowing release of more videos. A hearing was held on August 27, 2015.

CMP has said that it follows "all applicable laws". Daleiden has stated that, in the suppressed video, the "top leadership" of StemExpress "admitted that they sometimes get fully intact fetuses shipped to their laboratory from the abortion clinics that they work with and that could be prima facie evidence of born-alive infants". StemExpress has denied Daleiden's "intact fetuses" allegations:

CMP's accusations that this conversation somehow refers to "intact fetuses", which were never mentioned at any point during the entirety of the illegally recorded conversation, are false. StemExpress has never requested, received or provided to a researcher an "intact fetus". CMP and Daleiden's claims to the contrary are unequivocally false.

StemExpress CEO Cate Dyer explained the discrepancy as a misuse of terms by CMP operatives:

As anyone can see and read, the entire discussion was, in fact, about "intact livers." [...] My use of the term "intact cases" is a medical term of art that refers solely to "intact livers," as there was absolutely no mention of "intact fetuses" at any point in over two hours of illegally recorded video.

StemExpress has severed ties with Planned Parenthood as a result of the controversy, stating that their business with Planned Parenthood was a small percentage of their activities.

In September 2015, two courts ruled that Daleiden and CMP must turn over private documents and submit to depositions about how they orchestrated their video sting, and could require Daleiden to turn over paperwork and details of the operation, and provide the full raw footage he collected while posing as an executive of the fictitious tissue procurement firm Biomax. On December 4, 2015, U.S. Supreme Court Justice Anthony Kennedy ruled on an emergency appeal from the CMP. The CMP's appeal had asked the Justice to block the lower courts' order that would require CMP to release the names of its donors. Justice Kennedy denied the appeal.

In September 2019, a hearing was held in San Francisco to determine whether David Daleiden and his associate Sandra Merritt should go to trial for fifteen criminal counts of felony invasion of privacy. In this hearing, Daleiden's attorneys disputed the warrant by which agents with the California Department of Justice entered Daleiden's home and seized computers and digital storage devices, along with some phony identification documents in April 2016. The court, however, denied their claim that Daleiden was protected by California's Shield Law for acting as a citizen journalist, because the Department of Justice had sufficient probable cause of criminal activity to make the seizures. Following this hearing, Planned Parenthood and others affected by Daleiden's videos initiated a civil jury trial against Daleiden, Merritt, Troy Newman, Albin Rhomberg and Gerardo Adrian Lopez in state court. They are being accused of fraud, breach of contract, unlawful recording of conversations, civil conspiracy and also violation of federal anti-racketeering law.

=== Scientific impact ===
In August 2015, StemExpress cut all ties with Planned Parenthood for the procurement of human fetal tissue, which has had a severe impact on medical researchers. StemExpress was one of the main providers of human fetal tissue along with Advanced Biosciences Resources. According to a congressional report, research into the Zika virus has been stalled along with investigations into Alzheimer's disease, amyotrophic lateral sclerosis, diabetes, and childhood leukemia. Science Friday aired a segment about Dr. Eugene Gu, one of the fetal tissue researchers subpoenaed by Congress. Gu studies congenital heart and kidney diseases in infants but has since placed his research on hold after United States Marshals delivered the subpoena to his Nashville apartment, which is in proximity to Marsha Blackburn and Diane Black.

This is in spite of broad support for fetal tissue research by the scientific community. The New England Journal of Medicine (NEJM) published an editorial in support of Planned Parenthood's "efforts to channel fetal tissue into important medical research". The editorial argued that many medical advances would not have been made without fetal tissue research and that "Planned Parenthood, its physicians, and the researchers who do this work should be praised, not damned." The NEJM described CMP's actions as a "campaign of misinformation" and said that it is shameful that CMP "continues to twist the facts to achieve its ends". In addition, the NEJM praised Planned Parenthood's contributions to women's health care and stated that the "contraception services that Planned Parenthood delivers may be the single greatest effort to prevent the unwanted pregnancies that result in abortions".

=== Political impact ===
The videos were shown to several anti-abortion congresspeople, including Diane Black, Trent Franks, and Tim Murphy, weeks before being made publicly available. Black said that she was given advance screening of the videos, which "literally made [her] sick to [her] stomach" as well as "emotional and tearful", so that she would be prepared to comment on them after their release.

The timing of the first video led commentators to speculate it may have been released to coincide with a bill to raise money for Susan G. Komen for the Cure, which gives funding to Planned Parenthood. After the first video was released, Rand Paul and Diane Black introduced pre-prepared legislation to discontinue federal funding of Planned Parenthood.

On July 14, 2015, House Speaker John Boehner ordered congressional hearings into the practice procuring fetal tissues and organs by Planned Parenthood, and at least one committee committed to scheduling a hearing. Senate Minority Leader Harry Reid has said that Planned Parenthood's practices "should be looked into".

On August 3, 2015, the legislation failed to pass in the Senate with 53 supporting discontinuing funding and 46 opposed. This was seven votes short of the 60 needed to pass the bill.

On September 18, 2015, the U.S. House of Representatives voted 241–187 to defund Planned Parenthood for one year, allowing time to investigate alleged wrongdoing by Planned Parenthood. The vote was largely symbolic and was not expected to pass in the Senate; additionally, President Obama stated that he would veto legislation to defund Planned Parenthood. Some raised the issue that this kind of congressional vote could violate the United States Constitution, which prohibits bills of attainder, which refers to lawmakers punishing an individual or organization based on alleged infractions without a finding of guilt by a court.

==== Presidential campaigns ====
Several Republican presidential candidates repeated CMP's allegations that PPFA used tissue donation as a way to profit from abortion. Rick Perry said "The video showing a Planned Parenthood employee selling the body parts of aborted children is a disturbing reminder of the organization's penchant for profiting off the tragedy of a destroyed human life", and cited the videos as the reason why Planned Parenthood should lose federal funding. Republican presidential candidate Rand Paul posted on Twitter "...a video showing Planned Parenthood's top doctor describing how she performs late-term abortions to sell body parts for profit", vowed to campaign to defund Planned Parenthood, and called for Hillary Clinton to return Planned Parenthood's donations to her campaign.

Carly Fiorina said "This latest news is tragic and outrageous. This isn't about 'choice'. It's about profiting on the death of the unborn while telling women it's about empowerment". During the September 16, 2015, GOP presidential candidates' debate on CNN, she harshly criticized Planned Parenthood and their involvement in fetal tissue donation, stating "I dare Hillary Clinton, Barack Obama to watch these tapes. Watch a fully formed fetus on the table, its heart beating, its legs kicking, while someone says, 'We have to keep it alive to harvest its brain'". The website PolitiFact.com, however, said the video footage Fiorina referred to was not obtained from a Planned Parenthood clinic, but was stock footage of an unrelated live fetus, obtained from the Grantham Collection, "an organization that hopes to stem abortion by promoting graphic images of the procedure". It was then added by CMP to dramatize the description by StemExpress procurement technician Holly O'Donnell. In the edited video, O'Donnell alleged that while she was working in a pathology lab at a Planned Parenthood clinic, her supervisor told her that they would procure a brain from a well preserved fetus. O'Donnell said: "I'm sitting here looking at this fetus, and its heart is beating, and I don't know what to think." The New York Times reported that "while the authenticity of the videos remains a subject of debate, Mrs. Fiorina appears to have exaggerated their contents", and PolitiFact.com rated Fiorina's statement "mostly false".

Democratic presidential candidate Hillary Clinton, who "staunchly defended" the organization, said that the videos were "disturbing" and called for a national investigation into the sale of aborted fetal tissue. The White House said it would oppose any congressional attempts to defund Planned Parenthood.

=== Other reactions ===
Louisiana Governor Bobby Jindal announced, on August 3, 2015, that the Louisiana Department of Health and Hospitals was terminating its contract with Planned Parenthood, which provides the organization with state Medicaid funds. In court filings, the Justice Department argued that Louisiana's action violates federal law by denying Medicaid patients the choice of their healthcare providers. Also noted, neither of the two Louisiana clinics provide abortion services. The states of Alabama, New Hampshire, and Utah also cut their respective funding to Planned Parenthood in the wake of the videos, while Pennsylvania and Wisconsin were considering similar measures. The Obama administration has warned state legislators it may be illegal to cut funding to Planned Parenthood.

After consulting with the university's Bioethics Advisory Committee, Colorado State University president Tony Frank suspended the further purchase of fetal tissue for research purposes.

=== Colorado Springs Planned Parenthood shooting ===
On November 27, 2015, a gunman shot and killed two civilians and a police officer during a five-hour gun battle at the Colorado Springs clinic. The 57-year-old gunman surrendered to police and was taken into custody. During his arrest, he gave a rambling interview in which, at one point, he said "no more baby parts", an apparent reference to protests against the clinic, echoing language used in the news media about the clinic. However, authorities could not clearly identify a specific motivation.

U.S. Attorney General Loretta Lynch called the shooting a "crime against women receiving health care services". Colorado Springs Mayor John Suthers said that the shooting and standoff "certainly appears" to be an act of domestic terrorism.

Vicki Saporta, president of the National Abortion Federation drew particular attention to the videos, two of which were filmed at a clinic in Denver, 75 miles (121 km) north of Colorado Springs; these videos resulted in a number of threats against one doctor featured in the videos, who had to move out of her home and hire 24-hour security as a result according to Saporta.

The CMP issued a statement condemning the shooting as a "barbaric killing spree" by a "violent madman".

== 2017 developments ==
In March 2017, California Attorney General Xavier Becerra charged Daleiden and Merritt with 15 felonies related to the videos, including one count of conspiracy to invade privacy and 14 counts of filming people without permission in Los Angeles. In response, Daleiden issued a statement calling the charges "bogus" and pledged to release more videos. The editorial board of the Los Angeles Times published an editorial stating that while they disagreed with the CMP's cause and methods, the filing of criminal charges by Becerra was a "disturbingly aggressive" action against people "trying to influence a contested issue of public policy." On June 21, 2017, all the invasion of privacy charges (but not that of conspiracy) were dismissed with leave to amend. Soon after, the State of California re-filed the charges, amended.

In December 2016, Senator Chuck Grassley referred Planned Parenthood and other abortion providers to the Federal Bureau of Investigation (FBI) for investigation. In the fall of 2017, the FBI made a request to the Senate Judiciary Committee for access to un-redacted comments obtained from abortion providers.

== See also ==
- ACORN 2009 undercover videos controversy
