= David Daleiden =

American activist (born 1989)

- Born: 1989 (age 36–37); Santa Clara County, California U.S.
- Education: Davis Senior High School; Claremont McKenna College
- Occupation: Anti-abortion activist

David Robert Daleiden (born 1989) is an American anti-abortion activist who worked for Live Action before founding the Irvine, California-based Center for Medical Progress in 2013.

== Early life and family ==
Daleiden says he is the "child of a crisis pregnancy" and grew up "culturally Catholic".

Daleiden graduated from Davis High School in 2007 and later from Claremont McKenna College.

== Anti-abortion activities ==
In 2015, Daleiden released videos showing Planned Parenthood officials discussing fees for human fetal tissue and organs. Daleiden, an associate of Lila Rose, ran a Live Action chapter in 2007 and was the organization's director of research "during the early stages" of the project to make secret recordings of Planned Parenthood clinics. He originally registered his Center for Medical Progress [C.M.P.] as a tax-exempt biomedical charity. In furtherance of his plan, he set up a fake biomedical research company called Biomax Procurement Services. Daleiden and his collaborator, Sandra Merritt, posed as employees of Biomax and orchestrated surreptitious recordings of interviews where his associates asked about tissue donation costs, and questioned whether tissue samples could be acquired from African American patients with sickle-cell anemia. After the publication of the videos, Daleiden re-registered his Center for Medical Progress as a journalistic organization.

Planned Parenthood states that they may donate fetal tissue at the request of a patient, but such tissue is never sold. According to Molly Redden of The Guardian, the content of the videos was "broadly considered to be false, the product of aggressive and misleading editing". Fusion GPS, the production company Planned Parenthood hired in the wake of the scandal to debunk the videos, rigorously analyzed them and found what they considered to be "...'substantive omissions' on Daleiden's part. According to the investigation, the reviewers could not determine 'the extent to which C.M.P.'s undisclosed edits and cuts distort the meaning of the encounters the videos purport to document.' But, it said, 'the manipulation of the videos does mean they have no evidentiary value in a legal context and cannot be relied upon for any official inquiries' unless C.M.P. provides investigators with its original material, and that material is independently authenticated as unaltered."

The videos were shown to Republican Congressmen Trent Franks and Tim Murphy two weeks before being made publicly available, leading commentators to note that the timing of the release appeared to coincide with a bipartisan bill to raise money for Susan G. Komen for the Cure.

On July 31, 2015, the National Abortion Federation sued CMP and Daleiden, alleging that Daleiden's campaign violated its members' privacy and threatened their safety.

On January 22, 2016, Daleiden appeared on C-SPAN for a question-and-answer session that included viewer call-ins. He advocated reverting current laws back to the time when all elective abortions were criminal acts. The segment's opposing view was presented by NARAL Pro-Choice America policy director Donna Crane.

=== Injunction against further publication of videos ===
As part of the National Abortion Federation's lawsuit against Daleiden and the Center for Medical Progress, Federal Judge William Orrick III and the Ninth Circuit Court of Appeals issued an injunction in July 2015 forbidding Daleiden and CMP from publishing any more videos they had obtained at private professional meetings. In March 2017 a federal appeals court in March upheld Orrick's ruling, but new videos then appeared on the website of Daleiden's attorneys, former Los Angeles County District Attorney Steve Cooley and Brentford J. Ferreira. On July 11, 2017, Orrick found attorneys Cooley and Ferreira in contempt of court, saying, "With respect to the criminal defense counsel, they do not get to decide whether they can violate the preliminary injunction".

On July 17, Orrick found Daleiden, the Center for Medical Progress and their lawyers, Steve Cooley and Brentford Ferreira, in contempt of court. Orrick ordered Daleiden to turn over video footage and other materials related to his 2016 preliminary injunction.

On August 31, Orrick found Daleiden and his attorneys, Steve Cooley and Brentford Ferreira, owed $195,359 compensation to the National Abortion Federation for legal fees and increased security for "expenses incurred as a result of the violation of my Preliminary Injunction Order". Orrick wrote that Daleiden's attorneys, Cooley and Ferreira, were included in the sanctions intended to ensure "current and future compliance" with his order.

In November 2019, the Ninth Circuit Court of Appeals upheld Orrick's 2016 injunction, in a 3-0 ruling.

=== Dropped criminal charges in Texas ===
On January 25, 2016, a grand jury in Harris County, Texas that originally had investigated the Gulf Coast chapter of Planned Parenthood and cleared them of any wrongdoing, instead indicted Daleiden on a felony count of tampering with governmental records by making and using a forged driver's license, and a misdemeanor charge for emailing an offer to buy fetal tissue for $1,600.

Daleiden turned himself in on February 4, 2016, and appeared in court after posting $3,000 bond. He could have faced a prison sentence of up to 22 years if convicted, according to The Washington Post. He reportedly rejected a plea deal in the case.

The misdemeanor charge of offering to buy fetal tissue was dismissed on June 13, 2016, because of a defect in the indictment. On July 26, 2016, Texas District Judge Brock Thomas dismissed the felony charges by ruling that the grand jury exceeded its authority by indicting Daleiden and Merritt when it was chartered only to investigate Planned Parenthood.

=== Criminal charges in California ===
On March 28, 2017, California Attorney General Xavier Becerra filed 15 felony charges against Daleiden, alleging that he and associate Sandra Susan Merritt conspired to pose as BioMax employees in order to intentionally record confidential communications between themselves and Planned Parenthood employees in Century City (Los Angeles), Pasadena (Los Angeles), El Dorado (El Dorado), and San Francisco. On June 21, 2017, Superior Court Judge Christopher Hite dismissed fourteen of the charges, with leave to amend, on the grounds that they were legally insufficient because they did not include details such as the names of the alleged victims and the locations and dates of the videoed events. "Leave to amend" means that the prosecutors were allowed the option to re-file the charges with more details; the prosecutors did so some time during the week of July 3, and all fifteen felony charges against Daleiden and Merritt are active again.

On June 30, 2017, state prosecutors refiled the 14 dismissed charges with numerical identifications for each video. On August 24, 2017, the San Francisco Superior Court rejected new defense motions to dismiss the charges and allowed the case to proceed. Daleiden then pleaded not guilty.

In September 2019, a hearing was held in San Francisco to determine whether Daleiden and Sandra Merritt should go to trial for fifteen criminal counts of felony invasion of privacy. In this hearing, Daleiden's attorneys disputed the warrant by which agents with the California Dept of Justice entered Daleiden's home and seized computers, digital storage devices, and phony identification documents, in April 2016. The court, however, denied their claim that Daleiden was protected by California's Shield Law for acting as a citizen journalist, because the Department of Justice had sufficient probable cause of criminal activity to make the seizures.

On December 6, 2019, Judge Christopher Hite ruled that Daleiden and Merritt would stand trial on nine felony counts involving eavesdropping and invasion of privacy. At the February 21, 2020 arraignment, Daleiden and Sandra Merritt pleaded not guilty.

On Daleiden and Merritt's appeal, Judge Suzanne Bolanos decided in July 2020 that prosecutors could try Daleiden on nine counts and Merritt on eight.

=== Civil jury trial ===
Following the September 2019 criminal hearing, Planned Parenthood and others affected by Daleiden's videos initiated a civil jury trial in federal court against Daleiden and Merritt, and also Center for Medical Progress affiliates Troy Newman, Albin Rhomberg, and Gerardo Adrian Lopez. The defendants were accused of fraud, breach of contract, unlawful recording of conversations, civil conspiracy, and violation of federal anti-racketeering law. A verdict awarded the plaintiffs more than $2.2 million on November 16, 2019, and Daleiden was instructed to pay $500,000 in compensatory damages (most of which would be tripled under federal racketeering law), as well as $870,000 in punitive damages to Planned Parenthood. The Thomas More Society appealed the civil judgment on behalf of Daleiden. In October 2022, the 9th Circuit Court of Appeals affirmed that the videos were not protected under the First Amendment, but reversed the racketeering ruling. In October 2023, the United States Supreme Court declined to take up Daleiden's appeal, leaving in place the 9th Circuit's affirmation of the multi-million dollar verdict.

=== Civil rights lawsuit ===
In May 2020, Daleiden filed suit against California Attorney General Xavier Becerra and former Attorney General Kamala Harris, claiming Harris conspired with Planned Parenthood to violate his civil rights by prosecuting him for his undercover investigation.
