= Troy Newman (activist) =

American activist (born 1966)

Troy Edward Newman
- Born: 1966 (age 59–60); Anchorage, Alaska, U.S.
- Other name: Troy Edward Newman-Mariotti
- Occupations: Anti-abortion activist President, Operation Rescue
- Known for: Anti-abortion activist
- Spouse: Mellissa Newman

Troy Edward Newman-Mariotti, known as Troy Newman (born 1966), is an American anti-abortion activist. He is the president of Operation Rescue, which is based in Wichita, Kansas, and sits on the board of the Center for Medical Progress.

Newman became involved in the anti-abortion movement in the early 1990s, and in 1999 became president of Operation Rescue West, based in Southern California, then moved to Kansas in 2002 because the group wanted to focus on its campaign against abortion doctor George Tiller's clinic, one of the few in the nation to do abortions after fetal viability.

In 2015, Newman attracted international attention for his illegal entry to Australia for an anti-abortion speaking tour and subsequent deportation.

== Early life and education ==
Born in Anchorage, Alaska, Newman was adopted at birth to a family in San Diego, California. His experience with being adopted helped shape his anti-abortion views. Privately, Newman uses the name Troy Newman-Mariotti to honor his birth father, whom he located after becoming an adult. He uses his original surname professionally.

Newman was raised as a Catholic before becoming a Presbyterianism. He attended Whitefield Theological Seminary and graduated from Maranatha Baptist University.

== Career ==
Prior to 1990, Newman had given little thought to abortion. He and his girlfriend went to a Planned Parenthood clinic for a blood test required for a marriage license. After attending an anti-abortion rally in 1990, he became involved in the anti-abortion movement. Newman worked as an electronic engineer for Loral Aerospace and Ford Aerospace prior to 1995. He quit his job in 1995 to devote his attention to anti-abortion efforts.

=== Anti-abortion activities ===
Previously a leader of San Diego Operation Rescue, Newman joined Jeff White's breakaway group, Operation Rescue West, in 1997, after it split from the national organization led by Randall Terry (what is now known as Operation Save America). As White's second-in-command, Newman has been cited as "responsible for closing over two dozen abortion clinics in the Southern California area", although that claim has been disputed by others. His actions led to several lawsuits directed against the organization, including from Planned Parenthood and from the federal Department of Justice (under the terms of the Freedom of Access to Clinic Entrances Act). In 1999, following White's resignation, Newman became president of Operation Rescue West, and for the first time was able to draw a salary from his anti-abortion work, having previously had to rely on donations from supporters.

In 2002, Newman moved the headquarters of Operation Rescue West from California to Wichita, Kansas, and later changed the name of the organization to simply Operation Rescue. The name change was later the subject of an unsuccessful lawsuit from Randall Terry, the founder of the original Operation Rescue, who claimed that the trademark rightfully belonged to him. Shortly after the relocation of the organisation, Operation Rescue West launched its "Year of Rebuke" campaign in an attempt at publicizing the names of those with political, professional, and social ties to late-term abortion provider Dr. George Tiller. Their headquarters is located in a former abortion clinic which closed due to harassment by Operation Rescue and was purchased by Newman through a front group.

Newman developed the idea of using panel trucks, called the "Truth Truck" fleet, being driven across the United States, covered with graphic billboard-sized images of aborted fetuses circle outside sports arenas, schools, and clinic workers' homes to publicize his organization's message.

Newman protested at the execution of Paul Jennings Hill, who murdered physician John Britton and his bodyguard James Barrett in 1994. In a September 3, 2003 press release Newman stated, "There are many examples where taking a life in defense of innocent human beings is legally justified and permissible under the law."

In 2000, Newman published the book Their Blood Cries Out, featuring extensive sections comparing Tiller to Adolf Hitler, and likening abortion to "sacrifice to demons". He argued that doctors who performed abortions should be executed by the government "in order to expunge bloodguilt from the land and people".

On September 11, 2006, the IRS revoked Operation Rescue West's 501(c)(3) nonprofit, tax-exempt status. Newman's organization now operates under the name "Operation Rescue."

When Scott Roeder, who murdered Tiller in 2009, was interviewed by Amanda Robb of Ms. magazine, Roeder said he had met Newman and discussed using violence to stop abortion; "something like if an abortionist—I don't even know if it was specifically Tiller …was shot, would it be justified?… And [Newman] said, "If it were, it wouldn't upset me." Roeder owned a hand-signed copy of Newman's 2000 book.

On September 29, 2015, Newman had his Australian visa canceled by Immigration Minister Peter Dutton. Newman was due to speak at a number of anti-abortion events across Australia throughout October. Newman defied Australian authorities and entered the country without a valid visa. This caused him to be detained upon arrival and held at the Maribyrnong Immigration Detention Centre. On October 3, a High Court bid to overturn the cancelling of his visa was rejected, and Newman was deported back to the United States. Newman abandoned a bid to challenge the ruling.

Newman was interviewed for the 2018 documentary Reversing Roe.

On November 15, 2019, in a civil lawsuit that was primarily against David Daleiden and The Center for Medical Progress, damages were also assessed against Newman, as a board member of that organization.

== Views on other topics ==
Newman believes that the existence of LGBT communities poses a threat to the United States as a whole. He claimed that the late 2000s recession and extreme weather events were in part brought upon by God as retributive punishment because of legal abortion and tolerance for LGBT people. In Newman's view, broader American society has made it "too easy" to be LGBT. He argues that God will inflict active harm and judgment against such persons.
