= Center for Medical Progress =

Anti-abortion organization

- Formation: March 7, 2013
- Tax ID no.: 46-2252984
- Legal status: 501(c)(3)
- Headquarters: Irvine, California
- Website: CenterforMedicalProgress.org

The Center for Medical Progress (CMP) is an anti-abortion organization founded by David Daleiden in 2013. The CMP is best known for producing undercover recordings that prompted a controversy over Planned Parenthood in 2015; CMP established a fake company to pose as buyers of fetal tissue and secretly recorded Planned Parenthood officials during meetings.

The CMP released edited videos of the discussions which made it appear as if Planned Parenthood intended to profit from fetal tissue, although the full unedited videos instead showed that Planned Parenthood requested only a fee to cover costs without any profit. A grand jury in Harris County, Texas took no action against Planned Parenthood, but indicted Daleiden and a second CMP employee on felony charges of tampering with governmental records and attempting to purchase human organs. The charges were dropped six months later, but in March 2017 Daleiden and the second CMP employee were charged with 15 felonies in California—one for each of the people whom they had filmed without consent, and one for criminal conspiracy to invade privacy. Planned Parenthood also sued the CMP and Daleiden for fraud and invasion of privacy, asserting that the videos were deceptively edited to create a false impression of wrongdoing.

== Organization ==
David Daleiden formed the Center for Medical Progress in 2013 after working for Live Action for five years. He was that organization's director of research "during the early stages" of the project to make secret recordings of Planned Parenthood clinics. The CMP's board members include Daleiden, Troy Newman, and Albin Rhomberg, and they receive advice, consulting and funds from Operation Rescue. Their website initially described the organization as "dedicated to informing and educating both the lay public and the scientific community about the latest advances in regenerative medicine, cell-based therapies, and related disciplines." It was initially registered by Daleiden as a tax-exempt biomedicine charity, but after questions about the group's tax exempt status the organization's stated mission was changed to "a group of citizen journalists dedicated to monitoring and reporting on medical ethics and advances."

== Undercover videos controversy ==
Daleiden's organization set up a fake biomedical research company, called Biomax Procurement Services. Under this guise, they posed as potential buyers of aborted fetal tissue and organs, and secretly recorded Planned Parenthood officials during meetings. CMP released edited versions of these videos, which it promoted as showing Planned Parenthood officials "price haggling over ‘baby parts'". When the full, unedited, videos became available, they instead showed "a Planned Parenthood executive repeatedly saying its clinics want to cover their costs, not make money, when donating fetal tissue from abortions for scientific research." According to the lawyer for Planned Parenthood, Roger K. Evans, Biomax proposed “sham procurement contracts,” offering $1,600 for liver and thymus fetal tissues.

The videos and allegations attracted widespread media coverage, and re-invigorated the long-term American political abortion debate. Five separate congressional investigations of Planned Parenthood were launched as a result of the videos. A bill to defund Planned Parenthood was proposed, but failed to pass in the Senate on August 3, 2015. Several states cut contracts and funding for Planned Parenthood following the videos, regardless of whether Planned Parenthood provided abortion services in those states. An editorial in The New England Journal of Medicine was highly critical of the Center for Medical Progress, describing the videos as part of a "campaign of misinformation" by an organization that "twist(s) the facts."

Media Matters for America named The Center for Medical Progress their "Misinformer Of The Year" for 2015.

=== Civil lawsuits against the CMP ===
In the aftermath of the videos being released, the National Abortion Federation sued the Center for Medical Progress. In September 2015, two courts ruled that Daleiden and the Center for Medical Progress must turn over private documents and submit to depositions about how they orchestrated their video sting, and could require Daleiden to turn over paperwork and details of the operation, and provide the full raw footage he collected while posing as an executive of the fictitious tissue procurement firm Biomax. On December 4, 2015, U.S. Supreme Court Justice Anthony Kennedy denied an emergency appeal from the Center for Medical Progress to block the lower courts' order that would require CMP to release the names of its donors.

On January 15, 2016, Planned Parenthood commenced a lawsuit in federal district court in San Francisco against the CMP, alleging that the group and its members, in setting up a fake tissue procurement company and using fake identities to set up private meetings engaged in wire and mail fraud in violation of the Racketeer Influenced and Corrupt Organizations Act (RICO Act), unlawfully invaded privacy, and engaged in illegal secret recording, and trespassing. Daleiden and the CMP argued that they were exercising their First Amendment rights, in an effort to have the lawsuit dismissed, but their arguments were rejected by the courts and the lawsuit was allowed to proceed.

=== Criminal proceedings ===
On January 25, 2016, the findings of a Harris County, Texas, grand jury investigating the affair were made public. The grand jury cleared Planned Parenthood of any wrongdoing, and indicted two CMP employees. David Daleiden was indicted on one felony charge of tampering with a governmental record by making a fake driver's license and one misdemeanor count related to purchasing human organs; another center employee, Sandra Merritt, was indicted on one charge of tampering with a governmental record. The Texas charges against Daleiden and Merritt, however, were eventually dropped due to questions surrounding the authority of the grand jury to indict Daleiden and Merritt, due to the extension of the grand jury's term, with District Attorney Devon Anderson stating "The grand jury took the investigation where the facts led it; however, Texas law limits what can be investigated after a grand jury extension order is issued. In light of this and after careful research and review, this office dismissed the indictments."

On June 13, 2016, a Texas judge dismissed the misdemeanor charge of purchase and sale of human organs due to a technicality in the Harris County prosecutor's indictment. The next day, the Harris County District Attorney's Office said it would not fight the decision. The prosecution failed to provide proof that any fees offered or paid for aborted fetal parts were not covered by exceptions like physician or transport fees.

On March 28, 2017, Daleiden and Merritt were charged with 15 felonies in the State of California - one for each of the people whom they had filmed without consent, and one for criminal conspiracy to invade privacy. Daleiden's attorney, Steve Cooley, has sought the dismissal of all charges, based on the fact that the accusers are not named in the indictment, which would prevent Daleiden and Merritt from confronting their accusers, in violation of their Sixth Amendment rights.

On 21 June 2017, fourteen of the charges were dismissed, with leave to amend, on the grounds that they were legally insufficient. "Leave to amend" means that the prosecutors were allowed the option to re-file the charges with more details; the prosecutors did so some time during the week of July 3, and all fifteen felony charges against Daleiden and Merritt are active again.

In September 2019, a hearing was held in San Francisco to determine whether Center for Medical Progress affiliates David Daleiden and Sandra Merritt should go to trial for fifteen criminal counts of felony invasion of privacy. In this hearing, Daleiden's attorneys disputed the warrant by which agents with the California Dept of Justice entered Daleiden's home and seized computers and digital storage devices, along with some phony identification documents in April, 2016. The court, however, denied their claim that Daleiden was protected by California's Shield Law for acting as a citizen journalist, because the Dept of Justice had sufficient probable cause of criminal activity to make the seizures.

=== Civil jury trial ===
Following the September, 2019 criminal hearing, Planned Parenthood and others affected by Daleiden's videos initiated a civil jury trial against Center for Medical Progress affiliates Daleiden, Merritt and also Troy Newman, Albin Rhomberg and Gerardo Adrian Lopez in federal court. They are being accused of fraud, breach of contract, unlawful recording of conversations, civil conspiracy and also violation of federal anti-racketeering law.
