= Wiley Drake =

American politician (1943–2026)

Personal details
- Born: November 23, 1943 Magnolia, Arkansas, U.S.
- Died: January 27, 2026 (aged 82) Buena Park, California, U.S.
- Party: Republican Party (before 2008); America's Party (2008–2026)

Wiley S. Drake (November 23, 1943 – January 27, 2026) was an American minister and radio host based in California. He was the vice-presidential candidate for the America's Party ticket in California in 2008. Drake drew controversy for his use of imprecatory prayer. He was the pastor of the First Southern Baptist Church of Buena Park in Buena Park, California.

== Background ==
Drake grew up in Magnolia, Arkansas. He spent much of his time with his grandfather, Hamp Smead Beasley, a horse trader who took him to revival meetings. After winning a rodeo purse at 14, he joined the rodeo circuit. He joined the Navy at 17 and served on the Kitty Hawk.

Drake died in Buena Park on January 27, 2026, at the age of 82.

== Ministry ==
=== Homeless ministry ===
During the 1980s and 1990s, Drake clashed with officials of the city of Buena Park when he "turned his church parking lot and a church recreation building into a makeshift homeless shelter...", housing groups of homeless persons for months at a time. This activity led to his conviction in July 1997 of violation of building and property usage codes.

=== Disney boycott ===
Drake wrote the resolution at the Southern Baptist Convention in 1996 calling for a boycott of the Walt Disney Company over its decision to "promote homosexuality over family values" by granting health benefits to gay and lesbian partners of employees. At that time, Drake described homosexuality as "abnormal, biologically unhealthy, as well as contrary to Bible teachings." Drake later protested an unofficial "Gay Day" celebration held at Disneyland in 1998.

=== James Hormel nomination ===
He campaigned against the appointment of a gay man, former University of Chicago dean James Hormel, as ambassador to Luxembourg. "We need to speak out and say we do not want an avowed homosexual to represent the U.S," Drake said in 1997.

=== Huckabee endorsement scandal, 2008 ===
In early 2008, Drake, the pastor for the First Southern Baptist Church of Buena Park, was a vocal supporter of former Arkansas Governor Mike Huckabee's presidential campaign. He sent out a letter personally endorsing Huckabee. Because the letter was on church stationery, the Internal Revenue Service (IRS) began investigating Drake for possibly endorsing a political candidate as a church leader, because electioneering by churches is forbidden as a condition for churches' tax-exempt status.

Drake's possible violation of federal tax law was reported to the IRS by an advocacy group called Americans United for Separation of Church and State (AU). Drake called on supporters to use imprecatory prayer to pray for the punishment and even deaths of certain AU members, drawing controversy.

In May 2008, Drake announced that he had been cleared of any wrongdoing by the IRS.

=== Vice presidential campaign ===
Drake ran for Vice President of the United States in 2008, along with presidential candidate Alan Keyes, on the American Independent Party ticket in the state of California.

=== Response to the assassination of Dr. George Tiller ===
Drake was widely criticized for his response to the murder of abortion provider George Tiller on May 31, 2009. Drake stated on his Crusade Radio Program, "I am glad George Tiller is dead." He called Tiller "a brutal, murdering monster" and said he is "grateful to God" that the physician was killed. He also said, "This man, George Tiller, was far greater in his atrocities than Adolf Hitler." Religion journalist Cary McMullen has written that, in the wake of Tiller's death, Drake "has gone from being outspoken to being dangerously outspoken, perhaps criminally so."

=== Imprecatory prayer controversy, 2009 ===
On The Alan Colmes Show on June 2, 2009, Drake stated that he is engaging in imprecatory prayer, praying for God to kill President Barack Obama, who he claimed needed to "turn his life around." In 2008 he was party to a lawsuit in federal court, Captain Pamela Barnett v. Barack Hussein Obama, which claimed that Barack Obama was not an American citizen and therefore ineligible to be President of the United States. Also in 2008 he said that God would punish Rick Warren for agreeing to give the benediction at the inauguration of Obama, who he called an "evil illegal alien". He had previously used such prayers against employees of the Internal Revenue Service, Americans United for Separation of Church and State, and George Tiller.

In response to Drake's comments about Obama, the Southern Baptist Convention's Sing Oldham stated: "Mr. Drake does not represent Southern Baptist actions, resolutions, or positions in his interpretation and application of imprecatory prayers. Any comments made by Wiley Drake on this subject represent his personal views, not those of the Convention." Keith Olbermann, a television host on MSNBC, named Drake the "worst person in the world" in response to the revelation.

=== Nakoula custody, 2013 ===
On September 26, 2013, Nakoula Basseley Nakoula, aka Mark Basseley Youssef, producer of an anti-Muslim film that was blamed for violence in parts of the Middle East, was released from a halfway house to the custody of Pastor Wiley Drake.

Party political offices
Preceded by Chuck Baldwin as Constitution nominee	America's nominee for Vice President of the United States; 2008	Succeeded by Robert Ornelas
