= Operation Rescue (Kansas) =

US anti-abortion organization

- Type: Anti-abortion activism
- Location: Wichita, Kansas, U.S.
- Key people: Cheryl Sullenger
- Website: operationrescue.org

Operation Rescue (formerly Operation Rescue West or California Operation Rescue), the operating name of Youth Ministries Inc., is an American anti-abortion organization. The organization originated in California and is now based in Kansas.

Operation Rescue West was founded by Operation Rescue's tactical director, Jeff White, as a branch of Randall Terry's original Operation Rescue organization. Under White, Operation Rescue West maintained its focus on abortion. White left leadership to Troy Newman in 1999 following an $880,000 judgment against Operation Rescue for harassment and intimidation of Planned Parenthood staff and its leadership. In 2002, Newman moved the headquarters to Wichita, Kansas, to focus its efforts on late-term abortion provider George Tiller, who was assassinated in 2009. Their headquarters is now located in a former abortion clinic which closed due to harassment by Operation Rescue and was purchased by Newman through a front group.

== Activities ==
After the Freedom of Access to Clinic Entrances Act was signed into law in May 1994 by President Bill Clinton, Operation Rescue West implemented new tactics that did not involve arrest.

Operation Rescue operates a fleet of what it refers to as "Truth Trucks", large panel vehicles that bear images of aborted fetuses. These "Truth Trucks" travel around the nation showing what Operation Rescue describes as "grisly truth about abortion".

The organization offers a $25,000 reward for reports of criminal activity at abortion clinics which lead to a criminal conviction of what it describes as "abortionists". The first award was given in 2011 to a former employee at an abortion clinic.

== Lawsuit over use of name ==
Randall Terry filed a lawsuit against Troy Newman in 2008, alleging misuse of the name "Operation Rescue". Former Rescue leaders, including Keith Tucci (director), Patrick Mahoney (media director), Jeff White (tactical director) have signed a statement in support of Newman. "We now feel compelled to speak up because Randall's actions are hurting the work of Troy Newman and Operation Rescue in their efforts to see George Tiller end his barbaric abortion practices in Wichita, Kansas. Additionally, we can no longer remain silent while Mr. Terry continues to fleece unsuspecting pro-life people out of hundreds of thousands of dollars for his personal and selfish gain."

In 2006 after an investigation by the Internal Revenue Service into the nonprofit for electioneering in 2004, Operation Rescue West's tax exemption status was revoked. The group reopened under the name Operation Rescue.

== George Tiller ==
=== Efforts against Tiller ===
Operation Rescue has publicized a number of allegedly "botched" abortions at Tiller's Women's Health Care Services, including the death of Christin A. Gilbert following a third-trimester abortion. Operation Rescue staff have also investigated and made allegations regarding other facilities around the country. Dr. Tiller was cleared of any charges of medical neglect in the death of Christin Gilbert.

In September 2006, Newman and "personhood" anti-abortion activist Keith Mason showed up at an open-air gubernatorial debate dressed as cockroaches, protesting alleged unsanitary conditions at Tiller's clinic. Democratic State Rep. Vaughn Flora (Topeka) recognized Newman, tore his mask off, and was arrested for battery. Flora was fined $100 in return for a nolo plea. Newman later launched a $75,000 lawsuit against Flora which was dismissed. As of September 8, 2006, Youth Ministries Inc. (the incorporated name for Operation Rescue) had its 501(c)(3) status revoked by the IRS, following charges of improper use of contributions, and illegal endorsements of political candidates.

Operation Rescue also worked to mobilize support in the Kansas State Legislature to order the newly elected Attorney General, Democrat Paul Morrison, to reinstate misdemeanor charges that were dismissed on jurisdictional grounds against Dr. Tiller. The group planned a rally in front of the offices of ADA Nora Foulston, to present evidence of mass murder against Tiller.

=== Response to Tiller's murder ===
On May 31, 2009, Tiller was assassinated in his church. Scott Roeder of Merriam, KS was convicted of first degree murder in the shooting. Operation Rescue denounced Tiller's murder in numerous statements, describing it as "cowardly" and "antithetical to what we believe". The group also said that Roeder had "never been a member, contributor, or volunteer with Operation Rescue." Roeder responded to Newman's disavowal by declaring, "Well, my gosh. I've got probably a thousand dollars worth of receipts, at least, from the money I've donated to him."

The phone number for Operation Rescue's senior policy advisor, Cheryl Sullenger, was found on the dashboard of Scott Roeder's car. At first Sullenger, who was convicted for conspiring to blow up a California abortion clinic in 1988, denied any contact with him, saying that her phone number is freely available online. Then, she revised her statements, indicating that she informed Scott Roeder of where Dr Tiller would be at specific times:

"He would call and say, 'When does court start? When's the next hearing?'" Sullenger said. "I was polite enough to give him the information. I had no reason not to. Who knew? Who knew, you know what I mean?"

Women's Health Care Services was closed following his death. There were multiple efforts by a variety of physicians, activists, and organizations to open or reopen an abortion providing facility in Wichita. The Trust Women Foundation reopened in the same facility in April 2013.

== See also ==
- History of Operation Rescue
- George Tiller, murdered doctor who provided late term abortions
- Murder of David Gunn
- Operation Save America, formerly Operation Rescue and later Operation Rescue National

== Other sources ==
- Operation Rescue: A Challenge to the Nation's Conscience by Philip F. Lawler (1992) ISBN 0-87973-506-6
- Live From the Gates of Hell: An Insider's Look at the Antiabortion Underground by Jerry Reiter (2000) ISBN 1-57392-840-2
- "METRO DATELINES; Anti-Abortion Group Will Close Its Offices", The New York Times, December 17, 1990
- New York Times September 15, 2006 "Anti-Abortion Group Loses Tax Exemption" by Stephanie Strom
- Jim Risen & Judy L. Thomas, Wrath of Angels: The American Abortion War (1998) 2001
- Clinics Prepare for Operation Rescue 1993
- CourtTV
