= History of Operation Rescue =

The history of Operation Rescue involves the split of an American anti-abortion group into the two separate organizations Operation Rescue and Operation Save America.

== 1980s ==
Operation Rescue was founded by Randall Terry in 1986. The slogan of Operation Rescue was "If You Believe Abortion is Murder, Act like it's Murder." Randall Terry stepped down as director of Operation Rescue in early 1990, appointing Keith Tucci as his successor to lead the national organization, then called Operation Rescue National (ORN).

Operation Rescue's initial tactics involved obstructionist sit-in demonstrations to block the doors at abortion clinics in Cherry Hill, New Jersey and select boroughs of Metropolitan New York, co-opted from decades-earlier civil rights demonstrations led by Martin Luther King Jr. in the 1960s. Operation Rescue generated some press mimicking these tactics during the 1988 Democratic National Convention in Atlanta, Georgia, where over 1,200 OR members and supporters were arrested in July and August, capturing national attention. Independent OR-style organizations cropped up around the country during these early years, the most successful being the California organization, Operation Rescue West (ORW), founded by OR's National Tactical Director, Jeff White. In 1988 it held 182 blockades resulting in 11,732 arrests. In 1989 12,358 people were arrested at 201 blockades. By 1990 Operation Rescue owed $400,000 in fines. At its peak OR members had a staff of 23 and received a million dollars in annual donations.

The National Organization for Women and abortion clinics filed lawsuits against OR beginning in 1988. The suits alleged violations of the Racketeer Influenced and Corrupt Organizations Act (RICO), adding Randall Terry and Operation Rescue into the NOW v. Scheidler cases which were rejected twice over a 20-year period by the Supreme Court of the United States in favor of Scheidler.

== 1990s ==
By 1990 Operation Rescue was down to a core of “professional rescuers” living off of free food and lodging provided by other anti-abortion activists. After President Bill Clinton signed the Freedom of Access to Clinic Entrances Act into law in 1994, blockading clinics became prohibitively expensive, and civil suits could be filed against harassers.

=== 1991 Summer of Mercy ===
ORN's activities gained attention again in 1991 during the Summer of Mercy in Wichita, Kansas, led by Keith Tucci. Thousands of anti-abortion protestors flocked to Wichita and were arrested at sit-in protests and blockades of clinic entrances and adjacent streets. The protests were held at three different clinic locations in Wichita but focused on George Tiller's abortion clinic. Over 1,600 arrests took place during the first three weeks, with thousands of locals gathering and dozens of clergy becoming involved. The event lasted six weeks, with over 2,600 arrests by the Wichita Police Department, and culminated in a rally that filled Cessna Stadium, featuring televangelist / politician Pat Robertson.

While the protest lasted the summer, the impact on Wichita and Kansas politics continues.

Despite the large numbers of arrests, Operation Rescue founder Randall Terry was quoted as saying "The Wichita Police handled the Operation Rescue event better than almost any police department in history." As a result, Wichita Police Chief Rick Stone received the United States Department of Justice Marshal's Service "Law Enforcement Officer of the Year Award" for his "outstanding professionalism and law enforcement leadership".

=== 1992 Spring of Life ===
ORN made an attempt at a similar success in 1992 when Buffalo mayor Jimmy Griffin invited ORN for the so-called "Spring of Life." The event became ORN's biggest public relations coup, when thousands of out-of-area protestors on both sides of the argument descended on Buffalo and Amherst. The crisis and financial hardship that the city endured because of the incidents was believed to have brought down the Griffin administration later that year.

=== 1993 Leadership change ===
Keith Tucci departed as director of Operation Rescue National in late 1993. He turned the organization over to Rev. Flip Benham in Dallas, Texas and the work of Operation Rescue International over to Pat McEwen based in Melbourne, Florida. Benham soon began using the name Operation Rescue/Operation Save America, while McEwen changed the name of her organization to Life Coalition International. Both LCI and OSA remain active.

=== Name dispute and name change ===
In 1999, Operation Rescue West changed hands when Jeff White stepped down from his position as its director and transferred his leadership of it to Troy Newman. Newman moved ORW from California to Kansas, and dropped the word West from the group's name, simply renaming the organization Operation Rescue. After a dispute over the use of the name Operation Rescue broke out between Flip Benham and Troy Newman, and after Benham was named in a lawsuit, Flip Benham changed the name of his North Carolina group Operation Rescue National to Operation Save America. The former Operation Rescue West retained the name of Operation Rescue. The Kansas group is also referred to as Operation Rescue Kansas (ORK).

In 2006, after the Internal Revenue Service completed an investigation of the nonprofit for electioneering which it launched in 2004, Operation Rescue West's tax exemption status was revoked. The group reopened under the name Operation Rescue.

== Sources ==
- Live From the Gates of Hell: An Insider's Look at the Antiabortion Underground by Jerry Reiter (2000) ISBN 1-57392-840-2
- Operation Rescue: A Challenge to the Nation's Conscience by Philip F. Lawler (1992) ISBN 0-87973-506-6
- "METRO DATELINES; Anti-Abortion Group Will Close Its Offices", New York Times, December 17, 1990
- Jim Risen & Judy L. Thomas, Wrath of Angels: The American Abortion War (1998) ISBN 978-0-465-09273-4
- Clinics Prepare for Operation Rescue - AGAIN AP News, July 5, 1993
