= Church usher =

Role in Christian worship

In many Christian denominations, a church usher is responsible for seating guests and maintaining the order and security of services. The role of a church usher is typically a volunteer position, and in the past was often considered one of honor, particularly if a church committee selects an usher by a nomination.

== Organization ==
Church congregations often have a group of people that work as ushers led by a head usher. The ushers typically receive their instructions from the head usher. The head usher receives instructions directly from the pastor and is responsible for training and scheduling ushers.

== Duties ==
The church usher has various duties. Depending on the church's denomination, size, and preferences, ushers may perform some or all of the following:

- Seat guests
- Collect the tithes and offering
- Invite the faithful forward to receive communion in rotation
- Keep order at the entrance of the sanctuary
- Distribute bulletins and service programs
- Handle disturbances

== See also ==
- Steward (Methodism)
