= George Tiller =

American physician (1941–2009)

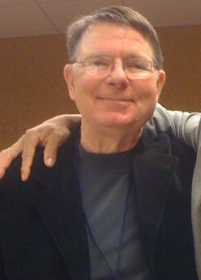
- Tiller in 2009
- Born: George Richard Tiller; August 8, 1941; Wichita, Kansas, U.S.
- Died: May 31, 2009 (aged 67); Wichita, Kansas, U.S.
- Cause of death: Gunshot wound to the head
- Education: University of Kansas (BS); University of Kansas, Kansas City (MD)
- Known for: Abortion rights advocacy, late-term abortions
- Spouse: Jeanne Tiller (m. 1964)
- Children: 4
- Medical career
- Profession: Physician
- Institutions: Owner-operator of Women's Health Care – Wichita, Kansas (1975–2009)
- Sub-specialties: Late-term abortion

George Richard Tiller (August 8, 1941 – May 31, 2009) was an American physician and abortion provider from Wichita, Kansas. He gained national attention as the medical director of Women's Health Care Services, which, at the time, was one of only three abortion clinics nationwide that provided late-term abortions.

On May 31, 2009, Tiller was fatally shot by Scott Roeder, an anti-abortion extremist, while Tiller served as an usher during the Sunday morning service at his church in Wichita. Roeder was convicted of murder on January 29, 2010, and sentenced to life imprisonment without possibility of parole until after 50 years.

== Early life ==
Tiller was born in Wichita, Kansas, the son of Catherine and Dean Jackson "Jack" Tiller, a prominent physician on August 8, 1941. He studied at the University of Kansas School of Medicine from 1963 to 1967. Shortly thereafter, he held a medical internship with the United States Navy, and served as flight surgeon in Camp Pendleton, California, in 1969 and 1970. In July 1970, he planned to start a dermatology residency.

On August 21, 1970, Tiller's parents, sister and brother-in-law were killed in an aircraft accident. In her will, his sister requested that Tiller take care of her one-year-old son. Tiller intended to go back to Wichita, close up his father's family practice and then go back to California and become a dermatologist; but he changed his mind and took over his father's family practice. Tiller's father had performed illegal, secretive, but safe abortions at his practice. After hearing about a woman who had died from an illegal abortion, Tiller stayed in Wichita to continue his father's practice. Following Roe v. Wade, Dr. Tiller was the only abortion provider in Wichita, Kansas for nearly 40 years.

At the time of his death, Tiller was board certified with the American Board of Family Practice, an Associate of the American Society of Addiction Medicine, and a clinical instructor in the Department of Family Medicine for Wesley Medical Center, where he had previously served as president of the medical staff.

Tiller struggled with substance abuse at various points in his life, which came to a head in 1984 when he was arrested for driving under the influence. He sought treatment, overcame his addiction, and later served on the Kansas Medical Society's impaired physicians committee.

== Abortion practice ==
Tiller's practice performed late-term abortions. The majority of Tiller's abortion practice involved elective late-term abortions authorized under existing state law. About three-quarters of these late-term cases were teenagers who had denied to themselves or their families that they were pregnant until it was too late to hide it.

== Protests and violence directed against Tiller ==
Tiller's late-term abortion practice frequently made him the a focal point for anti-abortion groups, resulting in nonviolent protests but also violent acts directed against him.

=== Anonymous firebombing ===
In June 1986, Tiller's clinic was firebombed. While it was being rebuilt, Tiller displayed a sign reading "Hell no, we won't go."

=== Protests by Operation Rescue ===
The group known as Operation Rescue held an event called "The Summer of Mercy" in July and August 1991, focusing on Tiller's clinic but also protesting other abortion providers in Wichita. In 1999, a branch that split from the main Operation Rescue group moved from California to Kansas specifically to focus on Tiller.

=== Murder attempt by Shelley Shannon ===
On August 19, 1993, anti-abortion extremist Shelley Shannon shot Tiller five times, while he was in his car. He returned to work the next day.

At the time she attacked Tiller, Shannon had been an anti-abortion extremist for five years and had written letters of support to the convicted murderer Michael Griffin, who had murdered Dr. David Gunn. She called him "a hero". At her trial in state court, Shannon testified that there was nothing wrong with trying to kill Tiller. The jury convicted Shannon of attempted murder, and she was sentenced to 11 years in prison. The following year, Shannon was sentenced to an additional 20 years in prison on charges of arson, interference with commerce by force and interstate travel in aid of racketeering in connection to her participation in several fires and acid attacks on abortion clinics.

=== Vigil protest by the Kansas Coalition for Life ===
The Kansas Coalition for Life kept a daily vigil outside Tiller's facility from May 9, 2004, until May 31, 2009.

=== Campaign against Tiller on The O'Reilly Factor ===
Tiller was discussed in 28 episodes of the Fox News talk show The O'Reilly Factor in the years leading up to his death, focusing national attention on his practice. Although he later denied it, show host Bill O'Reilly sometimes described him as "Tiller the Baby Killer", a nickname that Congressman Bob Dornan had used on the floor of the US House of Representatives. In November 2006, O'Reilly aired an exclusive report on The O'Reilly Factor, saying that he had an "inside source" with official clinic documentation indicating that Tiller performed late-term abortions to alleviate "temporary depression" in pregnant women. O'Reilly characterized Tiller as "a savage on the loose, killing babies willy-nilly", and accused him of "operating a death mill", and of protecting the rapists of children. He suggested that Tiller performed abortions for women who had "a bit of a headache or anxiety" or who felt "a bit blue". In June 2007 O'Reilly said on the air that he would not want to be Tiller "if there is a Judgment Day", also including in that judgment Kansas Governor Kathleen Sebelius and other Kansas politicians who supported "Tiller's business of destruction".

O'Reilly's campaign against Tiller included the on-air disclosure of confidential patient information provided by former Kansas Attorney General Phill Kline. For this breach of professional conduct, Kline's law license was eventually suspended indefinitely.

O'Reilly denied responsibility for Tiller's murder, and defended his campaign against Tiller, saying: "When I heard about Tiller's murder, I knew pro-abortion zealots and Fox News haters would attempt to blame us for the crime, and that's exactly what has happened. [...] Every single thing we said about Tiller was true, and my analysis was based on those facts. [...] Now, it's clear that the far left is exploiting—exploiting—the death of the doctor. Those vicious individuals want to stifle any criticism of people like Tiller. That—and hating Fox News—is the real agenda here."

== Prosecution ==
In 2007, Kansas prosecutors charged Tiller with 19 charges of illegal late-term abortions for allegedly consulting a physician who was financially affiliated with him in late-term abortion procedures in 2003. Kansas law prohibited abortions after the beginning of fetal viability unless two doctors certified that continuing the pregnancy would cause the woman "substantial and irreversible impairment of a major bodily function", with the requirement that the two consulting doctors must not be "financially affiliated" with the doctor performing the abortion. The case became a cause célèbre for both supporters and opponents of legal abortion. WorldNetDaily columnist Jack Cashill compared the trial to the Nuremberg Trials of Nazi war criminals, while Icahn School of Medicine at Mount Sinai Professor Jacob Appel described Tiller as "a genuine hero who ranks alongside Susan B. Anthony and Martin Luther King Jr. in the pantheon of defenders of human liberty." The trial took place in March 2009, with the jury finding Tiller not guilty on all charges on March 27, approximately two months before his death.

== Murder ==
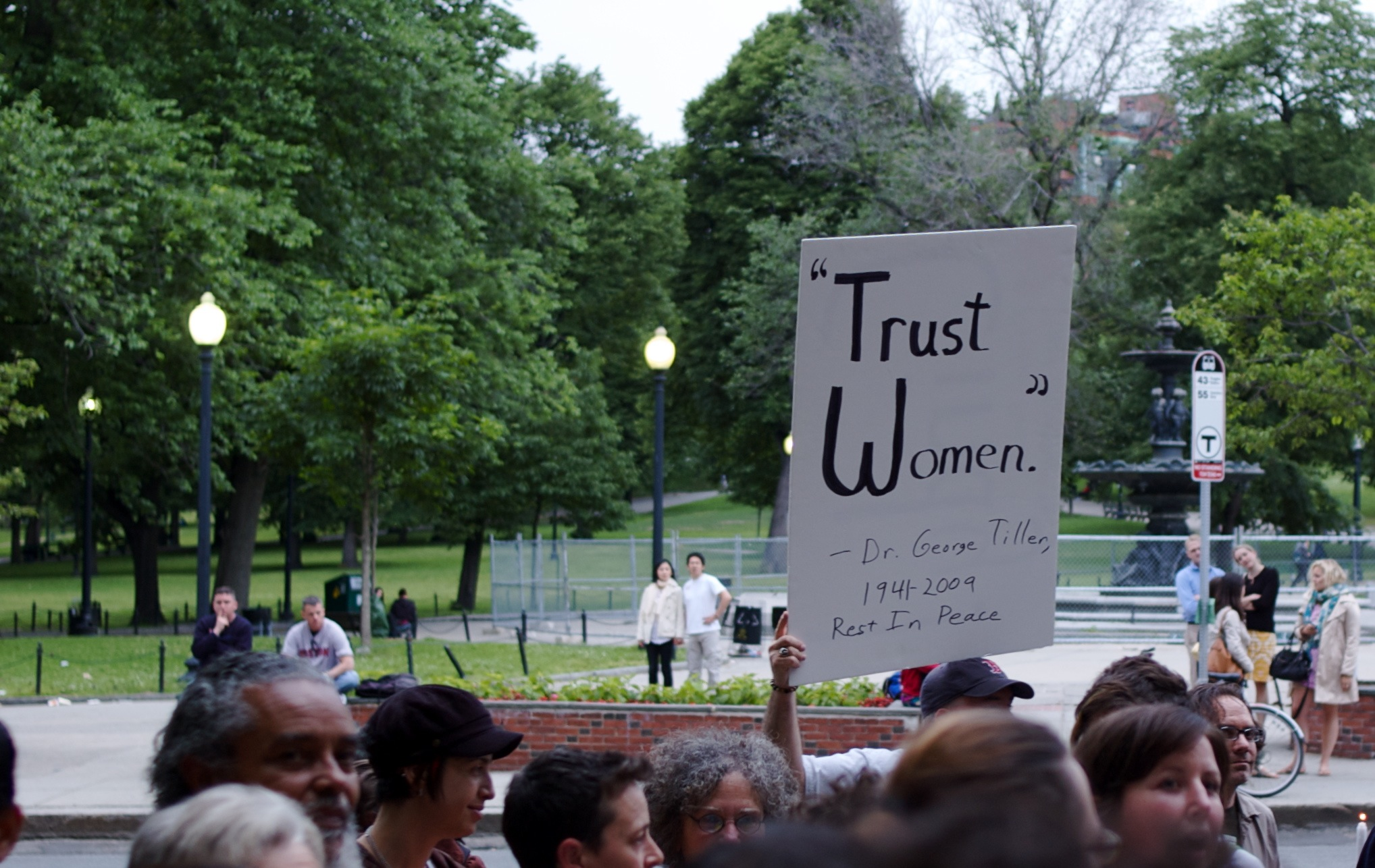
A June 1, 2009, candlelight vigil in Boston, Massachusetts, for George Tiller

Tiller was fatally shot in the side of the head on May 31, 2009, by anti-abortion extremist Scott Roeder during worship services at the Reformation Lutheran Church in Wichita, where he was serving as an usher and handing out church bulletins. After threatening to shoot two people who initially pursued him, Roeder fled and escaped in his car. Three hours after the shooting, Roeder was arrested about 170 miles (270 km) away in suburban Kansas City.

Cheryl Sullenger, at the time vice president of the anti-abortion organization Operation Rescue West, was in prolonged communication with Roeder before he murdered Tiller. Sullenger initially denied any contact with Roeder. After her name and cell phone number was discovered on a post-it note on the dashboard of Roeder's car, she subsequently admitted that she had informed Roeder of Tiller's scheduled court dates.

On June 2, 2009, Roeder was charged with first-degree murder and two counts of aggravated assault in connection with the shooting, subsequently convicted in January 2010 on those charges, and sentenced on April 1, 2010, to life imprisonment without parole for 50 years, the maximum sentence available in Kansas. The no-parole term was later reduced to 25 years.

Tiller's killing was largely condemned by groups and individuals on both sides of the abortion issue. US President Barack Obama said he was "shocked and outraged" by the murder. David N. O'Steen, director of the National Right to Life Committee, said the group "unequivocally condemns any such acts of violence regardless of motivation". Some others who spoke publicly were more confrontational. Anti-abortion extremist Randall Terry described Tiller as a mass murderer and said of other abortion providers, "We must continue to expose them in our communities and peacefully protest them at their offices and homes, and yes, even their churches", and Southern Baptist minister and radio host Wiley Drake said, "I am glad that he is dead."

After the shooting, Tiller's colleague, Leroy Carhart of Nebraska, stated that Tiller's clinic, Women's Health Care Services, would reopen after being closed for one week to mourn his death. The following week, Tiller's family announced that the clinic would be closed permanently.

The aftermath of Tiller's murder was the subject of the 2013 documentary After Tiller, which followed the daily lives and work of the four remaining late-term abortion providers in the United States.

The George Tiller Memorial Abortion Fund was established by the National Network of Abortion Funds. In 2019, during the successful 23–14 vote confirmation of David Toland as Kansas Secretary of Commerce, objections were raised to his nomination because he had led the Thrive Allen County non-profit, which had obtained $20,000 in grants from the Fund in 2015 and 2018, to help low-income pregnant women to stop smoking and to help prevent their unintended pregnancies. State Senators Rob Olson and Mary Pilcher-Cook, joined 12 other Republican senators, and community opponents including Mary Kay Culp, leader of Kansans for Life, to oppose his nomination.

Trust Women Foundation, a 501(c)(3) charitable organization, purchased and re-opened the clinic that Tiller operated and continues to perform abortions and other medical services. The foundation currently operates two clinics, the aforementioned in Wichita, KS, as well as one in Oklahoma City, OK. The organization also operated a third clinic in Seattle, WA until it was closed on December 31, 2019.

== See also ==
- Abortion in the United States
- Anti-abortion violence
- Barnett Slepian
- David Gunn
- Stochastic terrorism
- Right-wing terrorism
