= List of After Words interviews first aired in 2008 =

After Words is an American television series on the C-SPAN2 network’s weekend programming schedule known as Book TV. The program is an hour-long talk show, each week featuring an interview with the author of a new nonfiction book. The program has no regular host. Instead, each author is paired with a guest host who is familiar with the author or the subject matter of their book.

First air date (Links to video)	Interviewee(s)	Interviewer(s)	Book	Topic of interview / Comments
January 5, 2008	Susan Faludi	Marie Arana	The Terror Dream: Fear and Fantasy in Post-9/11 America	
January 12, 2008	Cathy Wilkerson	Bobby Rush	Flying Close to the Sun: My Life and Times As a Weatherman	
January 19, 2008	Kiron Skinner	Marcus Mabry	The Strategy of Campaigning: Lessons from Ronald Reagan and Boris Yeltsin	
January 26, 2008	Dana Milbank	Juan Williams	Homo Politicus: The Strange and Scary Tribes that Run Our Government	
February 2, 2008	Pete Earley and Sergei Tretyakov	Peter Earnest	Comrade J: The Untold Story of Russia's Master Spy in America After the End of the Cold War	
February 10, 2008	Michael Long	Kevin Merida	First Class Citizenship: The Civil Rights Letters of Jackie Robinson	Jackie Robinson
February 17, 2008	Mark Siegel	Akbar Ahmed	Reconciliation: Islam, Democracy, and the West	Mark Siegel discusses the book that he co-wrote with Benazir Bhutto, which was published several months after her assassination.
February 23, 2008	Anthony Lewis	Ronald Collins	Freedom for the Thought That We Hate: A Biography of the First Amendment	First Amendment to the United States Constitution
March 1, 2008	David Cay Johnston	Maya MacGuineas	Free Lunch: How the Wealthiest Americans Enrich Themselves at Government Expense (and Stick You with the Bill)	
March 9, 2008	Philip Shenon	Michael Duffy	The Commission: The Uncensored History of the 9/11 Investigation	9/11 Commission, Criticism of the 9/11 Commission
March 15, 2008	Mark Lynas	Gene Karpinski	Six Degrees: Our Future on a Hotter Planet	Global warming, Climate change
March 22, 2008	Carl Cannon	Bob Schieffer	Reagan's Disciple: George W. Bush's Troubled Quest for a Presidential Legacy	George W. Bush
March 29, 2008	Robin Wright	Anthony Cordesman	Dreams and Shadows: The Future of the Middle East	
April 5, 2008	Dee Dee Myers	Dana Perino	Why Women Should Rule The World	
April 12, 2008	Roy Gutman	Moisés Naím	How We Missed the Story: Osama bin Laden, the Taliban, and the Hijacking of Afghanistan	Osama bin Laden, The Taliban
April 20, 2008	Steve Coll	Michael Scheuer	The Bin Ladens: An Arabian Family in the American Century	Bin Laden family
April 26, 2008	Susan Jacoby	Nick Gillespie	The Age of American Unreason	
May 3, 2008	Bruce Bartlett	Clarence Page	Wrong on Race: The Democratic Party's Buried Past	
May 11, 2008	Rupert Smith	Winslow Wheeler	The Utility of Force: The Art of War in the Modern World	
May 18, 2008	Cokie Roberts	Patricia Schroeder	Ladies of Liberty: The Women Who Shaped Our Nation	
May 24, 2008	Matt Taibbi	David Corn	The Great Derangement: A Terrifying True Story of War, Politics, and Religion at the Twilight of the American Empire	
May 31, 2008	Mary Tillman	Tony Capaccio	Boots on the Ground by Dusk: My Tribute to Pat Tillman	Pat Tillman
June 7, 2008	Robert Kagan	Clifford May	The Return of History and the End of Dreams	
June 16, 2008	Ted Sorensen	Robert Schlesinger	Counselor: A Life at the Edge of History	
June 21, 2008	Andrew McCarthy	Hugh Hewitt	Willful Blindness: A Memoir of the Jihad	
June 29, 2008	Tom Hayden	Jon Wiener	Writings for a Democratic Society: The Tom Hayden Reader	
July 6, 2008	J. Phillip London	Rowan Scarborough	Our Good Name: A Company's Fight to Defend Its Honor and Get the Truth Told About Abu Ghraib	CACI
July 13, 2008	Raj Patel	Evan Kleiman	Stuffed and Starved: The Hidden Battle for the World Food System	
July 20, 2008	Rajmohan Gandhi	Amitabh Pal	Gandhi: The Man, His People, and the Empire	Mohandas K. Gandhi
July 26, 2008	Mahvish Ruksana Khan	Nancy Snow	My Guantanamo Diary: The Detainees and the Stories They Told Me	Guantanamo Bay detention camp
August 10, 2008	Patrick Cockburn	James Zogby	Muqtada: Muqtada al-Sadr, the Shia Revival, and the Struggle for Iraq	Muqtada al-Sadr
August 17, 2008	Anthony Kronman	Charles Murray	Education's End: Why Our Colleges and Universities Have Given Up on the Meaning of Life	
August 24, 2008	Thomas Frank	Jeanne Cummings	The Wrecking Crew: How Conservatives Rule	
August 31, 2008	Timothy Lynch	Gary Schmitt	After Bush: The Case for Continuity in American Foreign Policy	Foreign policy of the United States
September 7, 2008	Jane Mayer	Dana Priest	The Dark Side: The Inside Story of How the War on Terror Turned into a War on American Ideals	
September 14, 2008	Christopher Buckley	Charles Kesler	Supreme Courtship	
September 22, 2008	Zbigniew Brzezinski and Brent Scowcroft	David Ignatius	America and the World: Conversations on the Future of American Foreign Policy	Foreign policy of the United States
September 28, 2008	Harry Reid	Tom Daschle	The Good Fight	
October 4, 2008	Tariq Ali	Robert Dreyfuss	The Duel: Pakistan on the Flight Path of American Power	Pakistan–United States relations
October 11, 2008	Bob Schieffer	Rita Braver	Bob Schieffer's America	
October 18, 2008	James Bamford	Jonathan Landay	The Shadow Factory: The Ultra-Secret NSA from 9/11 to the Eavesdropping on America	National Security Agency
October 25, 2008	Andrew Bacevich	Ivan Eland	The Limits of Power: The End of American Exceptionalism	
November 1, 2008	Kimberly Dozier	Lee Woodruff	Breathing Fire: Fighting to Report -- and Survive -- the War in Iraq	Iraq War, Media coverage of the Iraq War
November 8, 2008	Marian Wright Edelman	Geoffrey Canada	The Sea Is So Wide and My Boat Is So Small: Charting a Course for the Next Generation	
November 15, 2008	Bill Gertz	Frank Gaffney	The Failure Factory: How Unelected Bureaucrats, Liberal Democrats, and Big Government Republicans Are Undermining America's Security and Leading Us to War	
November 30, 2008	Rick Wartzman	Susan Shillinglaw	Obscene in the Extreme: The Burning and Banning of John Steinbeck's The Grapes of Wrath	The Grapes of Wrath
December 6, 2008	Michael Medved	Mona Charen	The 10 Big Lies About America: Combating Destructive Distortions About Our Nation	
December 14, 2008	Brian Michael Jenkins	P.J. Crowley	Will Terrorists Go Nuclear?	
December 21, 2008	David Reynolds	Robert Remini	Waking Giant: America in the Age of Jackson	
December 28, 2008	Philip Dray	Peniel Joseph	Capitol Men: The Epic Story of Reconstruction Through the Lives of the First Black Congressmen	
