= What's the Matter with Kansas? =

What's the Matter with Kansas may refer to:

- What's the Matter with Kansas? (editorial), an 1896 newspaper editorial by William Allen White
- What's the Matter with Kansas? (book), a 2004 political book by Thomas Frank
  - What's the Matter with Kansas? (film), a 2009 documentary based on the book
- What's the Matter with Kansas? (The Americans), the fourth episode of the fifth season of The Americans.
