= Mark Gietzen =

American activist (1954–2023)

Mark S. Gietzen
- Gietzen in 2011
- Born: Mark Stewart Gietzen; February 9, 1954
- Died: May 14, 2023 (aged 69); Chambers, Nebraska, U.S.
- Resting place: St. Clement's Cemetery 46°56′31.7″N 101°52′49.7″W (Haymarsh, West Morton, North Dakota), U.S.
- Children: 3

Mark Stewart Gietzen (February 9, 1954 – May 14, 2023) was an American conservative political activist, notable for his start as an anti-abortion campaigner. He lived in Wichita, Kansas, United States. He was the chairman and founder of the group Kansas Coalition for Life. From 2004 to his death in 2023, he served continuously as the elected President of The Kansas Republican Assembly, a state affiliate of the National Federation of Republican Assemblies.

== Anti-abortion activities ==
Gietzen was the chairman of the Kansas Coalition for Life. One of the major projects of this organization was to place crosses each day on public property in front of George Tiller's late-term abortion facility in Wichita. As part of this project, anti-abortion activists were present on public property in front of the facility whenever it was open for business. Gietzen had protested the facility since 1978. Gietzen was leading the movement for heartbeat legislation in Kansas, which would prevent abortion care from being provided if a fetal heartbeat is detected. This bill would be similar to legislation that passed the Ohio House. According to The Wichita Eagle, Gietzen felt it would withstand a US Supreme Court challenge. He was working to gather thousands of signatures requesting a special session of the Kansas legislature to take up this legislation.

Following the rejection of the anti-abortion Value Them Both amendment to the Constitution of Kansas, in which 59% of the participating electorate voted "no" on August 2, 2022, compared with 41% who voted "yes," Gietzen helped organize what The Kansas City Star described in August 21 news coverage as "baseless allegations of fraud." The Star reported that Gietzen helped set aside just under $120,000 to pay for a recount in nine Kansas counties. The recount, finalized on August 21, changed the outcome by fewer than 70 votes; the margin of victory for the "no" campaign had been about 165,000 votes. Gietzen responded to these events by calling for another round of recounting. A spokeswoman for Kansans for Life, the lead advocate of the Value Them Both proposal, acknowledged in a statement to The Star that the recount effort had no hope of changing the result and called for advocates to "move the cause of life forward in Kansas, not backwards."

== Political activities ==
A profile of Gietzen in The Wichita Eagle described him as a "staunch conservative". As Vice Chairman of the Sedgwick County Republican Party, Gietzen became chairman of the party on August 13, 1992, after the resignation of the party chair. Gietzen went on to be elected chairman later in the year. In his role as chairman, he opposed a city sales tax increase, opposed Wichita taxpayer funding of art projects, converted a Democratic stronghold in the state of Kansas to a Republican stronghold, created a solid anti-abortion majority in the Sedgwick County Republican Party, and worked to elect Todd Tiahrt to the United States House of Representatives for Kansas's 4th congressional district. He resigned as chairman on June 10, 1996, to run for the Kansas State Senate. He was also a candidate for the same Kansas State Senate seat (28th district) in 1988 and 1992. In 2004, he lost in a Republican primary for the seat. In 2008, he ran in a primary for the Kansas State House in District 96.

At the Kansas Republican Party level, Gietzen worked to bring an anti-abortion leadership to the party during his chairmanship of the party in Sedgwick County. He served as president of the Kansas Republican Coalition for Life until his death. Gietzen publicly criticized former GOP state chairman Tim Shallenberger for welcoming Republicans who support abortion to the party, comparing him to President of the United States George W. Bush's failed Supreme Court nominee, Harriet Miers.

Gietzen was president of the Kansas Republican Action Assembly. This group is affiliated with the National Federation of Republican Assemblies.

Gietzen was featured prominently in several sections of What's the Matter with Kansas?, a 2004 book by liberal author Thomas Frank, and appeared as himself in a 2009 documentary film by the same title.

== Other activities ==
Gietzen was the director of the Christian Singles Information-exchange and was previously employed as a Boeing procurement quality auditor. He wrote a book titled Is it a Sin for a Christian to Be a Registered Democrat in America Today? and discussed it on a segment of the June 25, 2001, broadcast of Hannity and Colmes.

In July 1986, Mark Gietzen was charged with battery (spousal abuse) of his first wife. As a result of this crime he was placed on probation for twelve months, and subsequently was divorced. He affirmed these facts about his past in the course of a 1998 libel suit, which he lost, against State Senator Paul Feleciano.

In 1990, Mark Gietzen's ex-wife wrote a letter which was notarized, explaining the circumstances. It was published in September 1992. In the letter, she explained that while she signed a criminal complaint against her husband in 1986, she did not give accurate or complete information about the event to the court. In her letter, she states that she had overdosed on drugs a few hours prior to the incident. Coming back into the house while still under the influence, she began destroying household objects. Gietzen's wife then physically attacked Gietzen himself by throwing household items at him, starting the incident. Immediately after the fight, she intentionally broke a window, injuring herself, while Gietzen and their children were in another room. The letter further indicated that prior to the incident, Gietzen had never once touched her in anger. In the letter, she stated that she regrets signing the criminal complaint against her ex-husband.

== Death ==
Mark Gietzen died in a small plane crash in Nebraska, at the age of 69. The Cessna 172 he was piloting crashed on the evening of May 14, 2023, and he was pronounced dead on the afternoon of May 16, when the wreckage was found. Jalopnik noted a 2022 interview in which Gietzen stated that the cost of the recount for Value Them Both would hinder his plans to maintain the Cessna.
