= The 10 Big Lies About America =

Book by Michael Medved

The 10 Big Lies About America: Combating Destructive Distortions About Our Nation
- First edition
- Author: Michael Medved
- Language: English
- Subject: U.S. culture
- Published: November 18, 2008; Crown Forum
- Publication place: United States
- Media type: Print (Hardcover, Paperback)
- Pages: 280
- ISBN: 978-0-307-39406-4
- Dewey Decimal: 973 22
- LC Class: E169.12 .M427 2008
- Followed by: The 5 Big Lies About American Business

The 10 Big Lies About America: Combating Destructive Distortions About Our Nation is a 2008 book by radio talk show host Michael Medved. The book reached #30 on the New York Times Best Seller List.

== Publication history ==
The 10 Big Lies About America was published on November 18, 2008, by Crown Forum in hardback, and was released October 13, 2009, in paperback.

== See also ==
- Hollywood vs. America
- The Fifty Worst Films of All Time
- The Golden Turkey Awards
- The Hollywood Hall of Shame
