= American Feud: A History of Conservatives and Liberals =

2008 documentary film by Hall & Fary

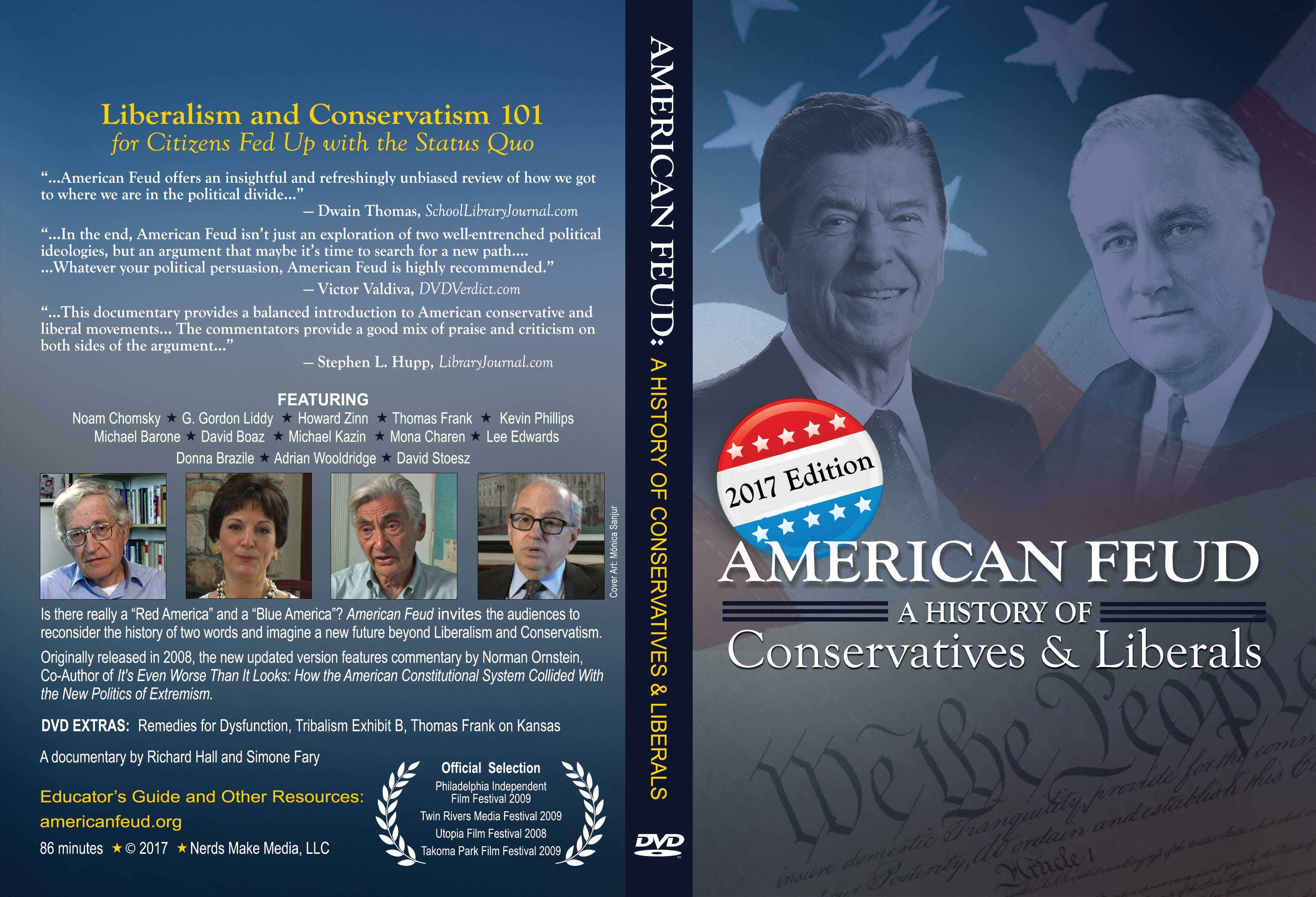
- Directed by: Richard Riggs Hall
- Produced by: Simone Fary; Richard Riggs Hall
- Release date: 2008
- Country: United States
- Language: English

American Feud: A History of Conservatives and Liberals is a 2008 documentary film by Richard Hall and Simone Fary. The documentary takes a non partisan look at the history of liberalism and conservatism in the United States since the 1890s Progressive Era.

== Synopsis ==
Participants in the documentary argue that modern liberalism began as a result of 19th century industrialism and as a reaction against the negative aspects of the new condition. Modern conservatism is said to begin as an argument against the New Deal of Franklin Roosevelt, and it slowly grew after World War II, as it opposed the expanding role of the federal government.

The political and intellectual history of modern liberalism and modern conservatism are presented in the revised 2017 edition leading up to the election of Donald Trump. Modern conservatism became a national political movement through the failed 1964 presidential candidacy of Republican Senator Barry Goldwater, and modern liberalism reached a peak but began to decline with the perceived failure of the Great Society programs and the prolonged Vietnam War under president Lyndon Johnson.

The opinions of scholars, authors, historians, and partisan activists from left, right and center are presented. Archival film, photographs and electoral maps help to trace the history, influence and shifting meaning of these two terms over the past 120 years. It also makes a critical evaluation of the concept of "red states" and "blue states".

The 2017 re-release includes a 2015 interview with American Enterprise Institute scholar Norman Ornstein, who argues that congressional politics have become increasingly dysfunctional since the rise of former House Speaker Newt Gingrich, and the "conservative" argument that much of government is bad. Ornstein also argues that the two political parties are becoming racially divided.

== Participants ==
- Noam Chomsky
- Norman Ornstein
- G. Gordon Liddy
- Howard Zinn
- Thomas Frank
- Kevin Phillips
- Michael Barone
- David Boaz
- Michael Kazin
- Mona Charen
- Lee Edwards
- Donna Brazile
- Adrian Woolridge
- David Stoesz

== Festivals ==
- Philadelphia Independent Film Festival
- Twin Rivers Media Festival
- Independents Film Festival
- Utopia Film Festival
- Takoma Park Film Festival
