= Market populism =

Political theory

Market populism, coined by American journalist and historian Thomas Frank, is the concept that the free market is more democratic than any political democracy. Frank himself does not believe this premise and sets forth arguments against it in his book One Market Under God. The concept received major widespread prominence in the 1990s when it was used to justify the New Economy, which consisted of a long bullish trend, and support for the free market.

== History ==
The concept's origins stretch back at least as far as 1933, when political scientist Harold Lasswell wrote:

The propagandaist outlook in fact combines respect for individuality with indifference to formal democracy. The respect for individuality arises from the dependence of large scale operations upon the support of the mass and upon experience with the variability of human preferences. The newspaper, the cigarette, the tooth paste, all depend upon a daily mass referendum. The possibility always looms that a new combination of appeals will supersede the old and push old tracts of fixed and specialized capital out of use.

== 1990s America ==
The concept of market populism became especially popular during the American New Economy, which began in the 1990s. Academics, executives, and leaders in the Democratic and Republican parties all shared the idea that markets were a popular system. In other words, because markets were considered to be efficient at allocating resources, therefore the application of market principles would root out inefficiencies arising from poor legislation or unethical practices. The phrase "golden straitjacket" was coined by Thomas Friedman in his 1999 book, The Lexus and the Olive Tree, as a synonym for market populism.

== See also ==
- Asian values
- Market fundamentalism
