= At Long Last Love =

1975 film by Peter Bogdanovich

- Theatrical release poster
- Directed by: Peter Bogdanovich
- Written by: Peter Bogdanovich
- Produced by: Peter Bogdanovich; Frank Marshall
- Starring: Burt Reynolds; Cybill Shepherd; Madeline Kahn; Duilio Del Prete; Eileen Brennan; John Hillerman; Mildred Natwick
- Cinematography: Laszlo Kovacs
- Edited by: Douglas Robertson
- Music by: Cole Porter
- Production company: Copa de Oro
- Distributed by: 20th Century Fox
- Release date: March 1, 1975
- Running time: 123 minutes
- Country: United States
- Language: English
- Budget: $5.14 million
- Box office: $1.5 million

At Long Last Love is a 1975 American jukebox musical comedy film written, produced, and directed by Peter Bogdanovich, and featuring 18 songs with music and lyrics by Cole Porter. It stars Burt Reynolds, Cybill Shepherd, Madeline Kahn, and Duilio Del Prete as two couples who each switch partners during a party and attempt to make each other jealous. Bogdanovich was inspired to make a musical with Porter's songs after Shepherd gave him a book of them. All of the musical sequences were performed live by the cast, for At Long Last Love was meant by Bogdanovich to be a tribute to 1930s musical films like One Hour with You, The Love Parade, The Merry Widow and The Smiling Lieutenant in which the songs were shot in that way.

20th Century Fox rushed the film's release, only allowing for two test screenings before the final version premiered at Radio City Music Hall. Despite a few positive published opinions from critics like Roger Ebert, At Long Last Love faced mostly horrendous initial reviews that mainly targeted the lead actors' performances of the musical numbers. It was originally considered one of the worst films of all time, and received very low box office returns, only making less than half of its $5.14 million budget. The critical reception was so negative that Bogdanovich printed newspaper ads apologizing for the film.

Apart from a 1981 videocassette release, At Long Last Love did not have an official home media release for many years; until the early 2010s the only available versions of the film were through bootleg TV and VHS recordings, and 16mm prints. Bogdanovich's 121-minute 1979 default version of the film was issued to Netflix in 2012, and the "Definitive Director's Version", which is 90 seconds longer, was released on Blu-ray in 2013.

== Plot ==
In New York, 1935, Broadway star Kitty O'Kelly is dumped by her boyfriend after drinking heavily ("Down in the Depths"). Italian gambler Johnny Spanish wins a poker game and returns to his shabby downtown apartment ("Tomorrow"). Spoiled heiress Brooke Carter returns to her hotel suite after a night out, only to be given an official notice by her maid Elizabeth, saying they will be evicted unless she settles the bill ("Which?"). Playboy millionaire Michael Oliver Pritchard III drives home with his chauffeur and valet Rodney James after being bored with partying all night long ("Poor Young Millionaire"). The hungover Kitty runs out and hails Michael's limousine, mistaking it for a taxi. Rodney manages to avoid her, but he still causes a minor accident. Michael and Kitty start chatting and take an instant liking to each other.

Brooke and Elizabeth go to the race track in order to raise money for the hotel bill. They meet Johnny, whom Brooke dislikes. Brooke bets her last $300 on the same race as Johnny. Johnny's horse wins while Brooke's finishes last. After the race, Johnny offers Brooke and Elizabeth a ride. Elizabeth declines, but nudges Brooke to accept. Kitty and Michael, increasingly smitten, drink champagne at his apartment, while Brooke and Johnny go for a car ride. Brooke finds herself warming to Johnny and confesses that she has not heard from her mother, who sends her money, in three months. Johnny offers to settle her hotel bill, which Brooke gladly accepts ("You're the Top").

Michael and Rodney attend Kitty's musical and wind up sitting next to Brooke and Johnny. As the show begins, Brooke recognizes Kitty as her former schoolmate Kathy Krumm ("Find Me a Primitive Man"). Afterwards, Michael, Brooke, and Johnny visit Kitty backstage and the two girls reunite. The four go to the nightclub and Michael invites them to his country house for the weekend. On the way, they pick up Elizabeth who finds herself attracted to Rodney, much to his annoyance. They stop at Johnny's place and Brooke is disappointed to find he is living in a poor apartment building. Kitty and Michael manage to improve their mood ("Friendship").

The next morning, Rodney and Elizabeth fix breakfast for their employers while recovering from a drinking binge. She tries to seduce him, to no avail ("But in the Morning, No"). Johnny apologizes to Brooke for lying and promises he will make a fortune soon. When she remains mad at him, he goes for a walk around the grounds. He runs into Kitty and flirts with her. Michael squirts shaving alcohol in his eye and accidentally bursts into Brooke's bedroom ("At Long Last Love").

Later, Michael's mother Mabel comes to visit and invites the foursome to a dance party at the Racquet Club; they reluctantly accept the invitation. Brooke and Michael sneak out to the backyard, but are noticed by Kitty and Johnny, who quietly leave the party ("Well, Did You Evah!"). Mabel interrupts Brooke and Michael to tell them that Kitty and Johnny returned to the city. While sharing a taxi with Kitty, Johnny seeks to make Brooke and Michael jealous by following them around and posing as a couple in their view. She agrees to do it, but eventually they spend a night at her place ("From Alpha to Omega"). Brooke and Michael return to his country house and she openly tries to seduce him, and succeeds ("Let's Misbehave"/"It's De-Lovely"). Elizabeth does the same with Rodney by barging into his bedroom and forcing herself on him ("But in the Morning, No").

Kitty and Johnny make out in front of Brooke and Michael at a baseball game and a boxing match. Michael is struck by their relationship, though Brooke is unperturbed. Finally, at a movie theatre, Michael fights with Johnny in the men's room. They make up immediately afterward. Consequently, Michael breaks up with Brooke, and Johnny breaks up with Kitty ("Just One of Those Things").

Brooke stays in her suite and does not return Johnny's calls, who wins $500,000 in a card game. Kitty avoids Michael, who buys a horse called Kathy-O. Brooke reads about the purchase in the paper and mourns her lost relationship ("I Get a Kick out of You"). Brooke's mother sends a telegram informing Brooke that she has deposited $1,000,000 in her account. Elizabeth persuades Brooke to go shopping. Kitty and Brooke accidentally meet in the powder room of the Lord & Taylor store and tearfully forgive each other. Along with Elizabeth, they state their disenchantment with men ("Most Gentlemen Don't Like Love"). Kitty and Brooke make plans to go dancing in the evening before leaving for a walk. Elizabeth phones Rodney and hatches a plan with him.

Walking in the park, Kitty complains of her unrequited love for Johnny, and Brooke of hers for Michael ("I Loved Him, But He Didn't Love Me"). Rodney, Michael, and Johnny arrive at the club. Rodney dances with Elizabeth, finally reciprocating her affection. Michael and Johnny rekindle their relationships with Kitty and Brooke, respectively, on the dance floor ("A Picture of Me Without You"). The bandleader asks the dancers to change partners and they do. Dancing with Kitty, Johnny observes that Brooke has never been more lovely. Michael, dancing with Brooke, remarks that Kitty has never been more beautiful.

== Cast ==
- Burt Reynolds as Michael Oliver Pritchard III
- Cybill Shepherd as Brooke Carter
- Madeline Kahn as Kitty O'Kelly
- Duilio Del Prete as Johnny Spanish
- Eileen Brennan as Elizabeth
- John Hillerman as Rodney James
- Mildred Natwick as Mabel Pritchard
- M. Emmet Walsh as Harold

== Production ==
At Long Last Love was Bogdanovich's first musical film, as well as the first motion picture he wrote by himself. He got the idea to do a musical film of Cole Porter songs when his then-girlfriend Cybill Shepherd gave him a book of songs by the composer. "His lyrics conveyed a frivolous era," said the director. "With a kind of sadness, but very subtle... Cole Porter lyrics are less sentimental than, say, Gershwin and more abrasive... Gershwin was the greater musician. But Cole was a better lyricist and I was more interested in lyrics than music." When he heard the lyrics for "I Loved Him", with its reversal of emotion and wry lyric, he decided to use that as the finale and "worked back from there". The film was originally called Quadrille and was equally weighted between the four lead characters.

In September 1973, Bogadanovich announced the cast would be Cybill Shepherd, Madeline Kahn, Ryan O'Neal, and the director himself. Shepherd had recorded an album of Cole Porter songs paid for by Paramount called Cybill Does It... to Cole Porter. By March 1974, Bogdanovich had decided to not act, and replaced himself with Elliott Gould, who had experience in musical theatre. Gould and O'Neal dropped out. By March 1974, Burt Reynolds had replaced Gould. Bogdanovich says he was "talked into" using Burt Reynolds, who wanted to try a musical. "The whole joke is that he's kind of a nice fellow, good looking, not particularly good at dancing. He can't dally with the girl. He's rather ineffectual." He gave the other male lead to Duilio Del Prete who had just been in Bogdanovich's Daisy Miller and who the director thought was going to be a big star. In March 1974, Fox agreed to finance the film.

Filming started in August 1974. Resisting the urge to shoot another film in black and white, Bogdanovich had it art-directed as "Black and White in Color". He wanted the characters to feel like they were having a conversation using "greeting cards in the form of songs" like "they didn't know what to say to each other." The movies of Ernst Lubitsch with Jeanette MacDonald and Maurice Chevalier such as One Hour With You, The Love Parade, The Merry Widow and The Smiling Lieutenant influenced Bogdanovich to have all of the song sequences be filmed live, as it would recreate the "kind of sad, funny, melancholy, silly," and "spontaneous" vibe of the films. However, all of the lead actors, especially Reynolds "weren't accomplished singers or dancers," resulting in a lot of delays and mess-ups during the shooting process.

In addition, the cast had a tough time performing the sequences due to having to perform them in one take and deal with wonky receiver systems in order to listen to the instrumentals. Bogdanovich later said he "was very arrogant" during the making of the film, "but that arrogance was bought out of a frantic insecurity. I knew it was so possible I was wrong that I became tough about insisting that I was right."

== Versions ==
The studio rushed the film into release, with only two previews in San Jose, California (which Bogadanovich recalled being "a total disaster") and Denver, Colorado. Bogdanovich made more changes to the film to have it be more focused on Reynolds' character due to pressure from the studio, and the final version was never previewed. Following a premiere at 20th Century-Fox Studios in Los Angeles on March 1, 1975, the film opened March 6 at Radio City Music Hall to scathing reviews and poor box office returns. The chorus of critical attacks prompted Bogdanovich to have an open letter of apology printed in newspapers throughout the U.S. Bogdanovich later said once the film was released "I realized how I should have cut it after that and I immediately did cut it, they let me recut and I think I paid for that, and that version was then shown on television and that's the version that all release prints have been ever since. That was quite different from the opening version. Very different, but unfortunately it was too late." The director has stated many people who first saw it in this version did not react so badly to the film.

== Reception ==
The ushers flung open the doors, with the red-leather padding, and not one person came out [of the theater]. We sat down, ten minutes later the movie started, and we were the only people there. The theater was empty. I felt so badly for Peter, I thought I was going to die.

— Peter Bogdanovich's ex-wife Polly Platt, on her reaction to seeing At Long Last Love with her daughters

Jay Cocks in Time led the condemnation, stating; "this Cole Porter coloring book, mounted with great expense and no taste, is one of those grand catastrophes that make audiences either hoot in derisive surprise or look away in embarrassment", adding; "when dancing, the stars look as if they're extinguishing a camp fire." Pauline Kael in The New Yorker called it a "stillborn musical comedy-a relentlessly vapid pastiche". Vincent Canby of The New York Times called the film "Peter Bogdanovich's audacious attempt to make a stylish, nineteen-thirties Hollywood musical comedy with a superb score by Cole Porter but with performers who don't dance much and whose singing abilities might be best hidden in a very large choir." Charles Champlin of the Los Angeles Times called it "the year's most frustrating failure."

John Simon wrote in Esquire that the film, "may be the worst movie musical of this or any decade: Sitting through this movie is like having someone at a fancy Parisian restaurant, who neither speaks nor reads French, read out stentoriously the entire long menu in his best Arkansas accent, and occasionally interrupt himself to chortle at his own cleverness"; and he particularly criticized Cybill Shepherd, stating, "Cybill Shepherd, Mr B's inamorata, plays a poor little snotty rich girl with a notion of sophistication that is underpassed only by her acting ability. (I will not even sully my pen by making it describe her singing and dancing.) If it weren't for an asinine superciliousness radiating from her, Miss Shepherd would actually be pitiable, rather like a kid from an orphanage trying to play Noel Coward." Frank Rich also condemned the film and Shepherd specifically in The New Times, calling the film "the most perverse movie musical ever made...a colossal, overextravagant in-joke...Every time his stars open their mouths or shake their legs, they trample on Cole Porter’s grave...As for Shepherd’s dancing, the best to be said is that it may not be recognizable as such: when this horsey ex-model starts prancing around, she tends to look as if she’s fighting off a chronic case of trots.

Gene Siskel of the Chicago Tribune gave the film 2 stars out of 4 and wrote, "The musical numbers are a mess. Nobody knows how to dance; nobody knows how to sing. Shepherd tries to hit the high notes and ends up sounding like a choir girl with a changing voice; Reynolds maintains good cheer, but too often slides into a Dean Martin accent that has nothing to do with the '30s." Bruce Williamson attacked the film in a review for Playboy and stated "Duilio Del Prete, an Italian discovery with no voice, sings as if he came to paint the mansion and stayed on to regale the company with wobbly impersonations of Louis Jourdan and Maurice Chevalier." John Barbour wrote in Los Angeles: "If this Peter Bogdanovich fiasco were any more of a dog, it would shed", and, "Burt Reynolds sings like Dean Martin with adenoids and dances like a drunk killing cockroaches". TV Guide remarked: "One of the worst bombs of the 1970s, this foolish attempt at re-creating the lush musicals of the 1930s offers fabulous art deco sets, memorable Cole Porter songs, and slick production values, yet it goes down like a stricken elephant."

Burt Reynolds later said the film was:

Not as bad as it was reviewed. What was reviewed was Cybill and Peter's relationship. You see, Peter Bogdanovich has done something that all critics will never forgive him for doing. That is, stop being a critic, go make a film and have that film be enormously successful. What he did then was to go on talk shows, and be rather arrogant and talk about how bad critics are. That was the final straw. So they were waiting with their knives and whatever. And along came Peter who finally gave them something they could kill him with. Unfortunately there I was, between Cybill's broad shoulders and Peter's ego. And I got killed along with the rest of them.

"I came out of it with better reviews than anyone else," added Reynolds. "But that's like staying afloat longer than anybody else when the Titanic sunk. I still drowned."

Despite the negative reviews, Roger Ebert gave the film a mildly positive review, awarding 2.5 stars out of 4: "It's impossible not to feel affection for At Long Last Love Peter Bogdanovich's much-maligned evocation of the classical 1930s musical. It's a light, silly, impeccably stylish entertainment...The movie's no masterpiece, but I can't account for the viciousness of some of the critical attacks against it. It's almost as if Bogdanovich is being accused of the sin of pride for daring to make a musical in the classical Hollywood style...Bogdanovich has too much taste, too sure a feel for the right tone, to go seriously wrong. And if he doesn't go spectacularly right, at least he provides small pleasures and great music."

Filmink magazine wrote the film "has to be seen to be believed. Not a complete success as a film but glorious in its ambition. Once you get into the groove, it’s actually a lot of fun and Cybill is great. People were unnecessarily mean to it, but they’d been waiting with baseball bats for Bogdanovich for a long time. He tried again to make a star of Duilio Del Prete here – didn’t happen."

At Long Last Love was listed in the 1978 book The Fifty Worst Films of All Time, was cited in The Golden Turkey Awards (winning the award for "The Worst Musical Extravaganza of All Time"), and was listed as a major financial disaster in The Hollywood Hall of Shame, all written by Harry and Michael Medved.

At Long Last Love currently holds a 23% rating on Rotten Tomatoes based on 64 reviews, with an average rating of 5.6/10. The consensus summarizes: "Brought down by stiff performances and clumsy direction, At Long Last Love is a visually appealing but woefully misguided tribute to 1930s musicals."

Film director Rian Johnson put At Long Last Love among his ten favorite musical films of the 1970s. He went on to write: "I'm here to tell you, they were all wrong. This movie is a delight. My wife and I love everything about it, we even have this poster up in our kitchen. Pop some dom, put on some white gloves and enjoy." Johnson's wife, film historian Karina Longworth, reiterated this on her podcast You Must Remember This, calling At Long Last Love one of her favorite films. Writing in 2018, critic Richard Brody of The New Yorker described the movie as "an overlooked masterwork."

== Home media ==
At Long Last Love was released on videocassette by Magnetic Video in 1981. In addition, there were different versions (each with different scenes and numbers added and missing) floating around among fans and collectors, from 16mm prints and various TV broadcasts.

The director dismissed the film as a painful memory until around 2011 when he was told it was streaming on Netflix and people were liking it. For the first time in many years, he watched it himself, and for the first time in years, he liked what he saw. But it was not his cut. It was discovered that a longtime studio editor named Jim Blakely had secretly assembled another edit (running approximately 121 minutes), which more closely resembled Bogdanovich's shooting script and first preview cut. He quietly substituted it as the default version as early as 1979, and that was the version made available on streaming. Bogdanovich has gratefully acknowledged Blakely, who died before anyone learned what he had done.

After finding out how it happened, Bogdanovich called Fox to say he liked that version. He made some refinements, including 90 seconds of restored footage, bringing the final running time to 123 minutes. The studio released it as the "Definitive Director's Version" on Blu-ray Disc in June 2013, resulting in more positive reviews than the theatrical version received.

== See also ==
- List of American films of 1975
- List of 20th century films considered the worst
