= Larry Bartels =

American political scientist

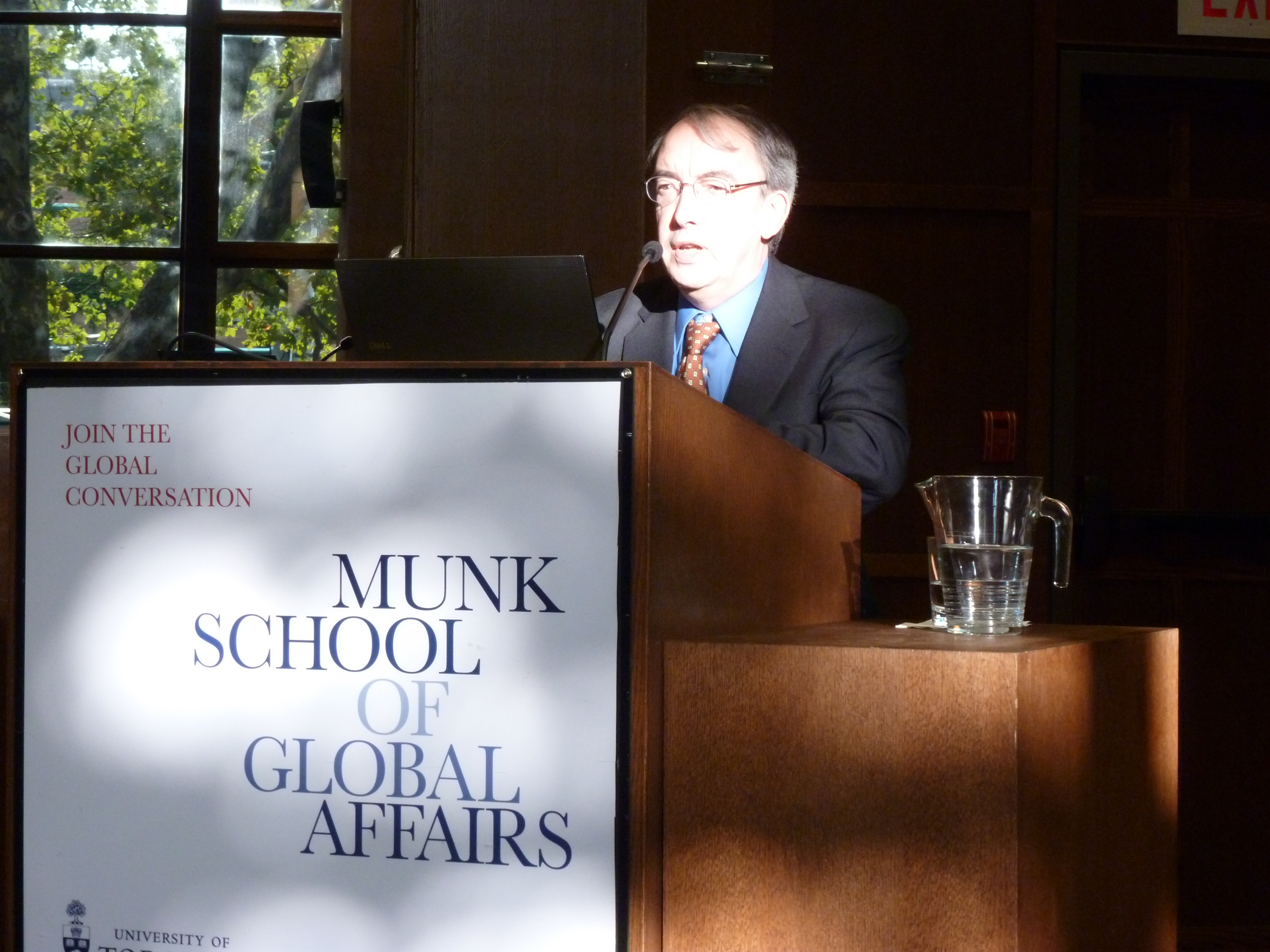
- Born: May 16, 1956 (age 70)

Academic background
- Education: Yale University (BA, MA); University of California, Berkeley (PhD)

Larry Martin Bartels (born December 16, 1956) is an American political scientist and the Co-Director of the Center for the Study of Democratic Institutions and Shayne Chair in Public Policy and Social Science at Vanderbilt University. Prior to his appointment at Vanderbilt, Bartels served as the Donald E. Stokes Professor of Public Policy and International Relations and founding director of the Center for the Study of Democratic Politics at the Woodrow Wilson School of Public and International Affairs at Princeton University. He was elected a Member of the American Philosophical Society in 2019.

== Biography ==
Bartels received his B.A. in political science with distinction from Yale College in 1978, his M.A. in political science, also from Yale, in 1978, and his Ph.D. in political science from the University of California, Berkeley in 1983. He was elected a Fellow of the American Academy of Arts and Sciences in 1995. He has published three books, Unequal Democracy: The Political Economy of The New Gilded Age (Princeton, 2008), Campaign Reform: Insights and Evidence, edited with Lynn Vavreck (University of Michigan Press, 2000), and Presidential Primaries and The Dynamics of Public Choice (Princeton, 1988).

His rebuttal to Thomas Frank's What's the Matter with Kansas?, entitled What's the matter with What's the matter with Kansas was published in the Quarterly Journal of Political Science in 2006. While Frank asserts that the conservative Republican Party has been able to lure working class voters away from the liberal Democratic Party, which better represents their economic interests, with value issues, such as abortion and same-sex marriage, Bartels points out that the working class, despite being socially more conservative, is still overwhelmingly Democratic, more so than in the past.

In his empirical analysis, Bartels finds that both college graduates and working-class people are mostly Democratic, the former having become more Democratic over the past years. He attributes the gain made by Republicans to the loss of the Solid South, with middle and high income whites from Southern states standing out as having become more Republican.

Bartels studied the voting patterns of the US Senate and correlated it with the responsiveness to the opinions of different amounts of Income in the United States.

In his 2008 book, Unequal Democracy: The political economy of the new gilded age, Bartels demonstrates that income inequality expanded under Republican presidential administrations and narrowed under Democratic presidential administrations since the early 1970s, when income inequality first started to expand. Under Republican presidents, rich families saw substantial net gains in their income, while poorer families saw negligible gains, producing a significant net increase in income inequality. By contrast, under Democratic presidents, poor families did slightly better than rich families proportionally, lessening income inequality.

However, all income brackets, from the bottom 20% to the top 5% of the population, saw significantly greater increases in income under Democratic presidents than under Republican presidents. In other words, had Democratic presidents been in office since the 1970s, income inequality may have lessened since the 1950s instead of growing into what Bartels calls "The New Gilded Age" of the early 21st century. Bartels's findings led him to conclude that "economic inequality is, in substantial part, a political phenomenon."

== Recognition ==
In January 2025, President Biden awarded Bartels the National Medal of Science.

== Bibliography ==
- Achen, Christopher H.; Bartels, Larry M. (2016). Democracy for Realists: Why Elections Do Not Produce Responsive Government. Princeton: Princeton University Press. ISBN 0691169446.
- Bartels, Larry M. (March 2006). "What's the matter with "What's the Matter with Kansas?"". Quarterly Journal of Political Science. 1 (2). Now Publishing Inc.: 201–226. doi:10.1561/100.00000010.
- Continuity and Crisis: Popular Reactions to the Great Recession (ed. with Nancy Bermeo, 2013)
- Bartels, Larry M. (2023). Democracy Erodes from the Top: Leaders, Citizens, and the Challenge of Populism in Europe. Princeton: Princeton University Press. ISBN 9780691244501.
