= What's the Matter with Kansas? (editorial) =

1896 newspaper editorial in support of William McKinley

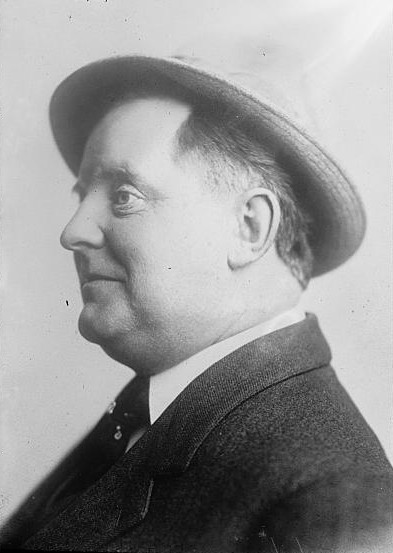
William Allen White, the author of "What's the Matter with Kansas?"

"What's the Matter with Kansas?" was a newspaper editorial authored by William Allen White in August 1896 and widely republished across the United States. The editorial criticized presidential candidate William Jennings Bryan, whose populist platform advocated for the free silver standard. The editorial was leveraged by the William McKinley campaign, and has been credited with leading to McKinley's victory in the presidential election. The piece made White, then 29 years old, internationally famous.

White later stated that he wrote the editorial in haste, referring to it as "pure vitriol" inspired by a confrontation on the street as he was walking to work. He later disavowed the editorial, and advocated for progressive reforms in regular columns in McClure's Magazine.

The editorial and its themes have been invoked numerous times since its initial publication.

== See also ==
- What's the Matter with Kansas?, 2004 book
- What's the Matter with Kansas?, 2009 film
