= North West Mounted Police (film) =

1940 film by Cecil B. DeMille, Arthur Rosson

Northwest Mounted Police
- Australian theatrical release poster
- Directed by: Cecil B. DeMille
- Screenplay by: Alan Le May; Jesse Lasky Jr.; C. Gardner Sullivan
- Based on: The Royal Canadian Mounted Police by R. C. Fetherstonhaugh
- Produced by: Cecil B. DeMille
- Starring: Gary Cooper; Madeleine Carroll; Paulette Goddard; Preston Foster; Robert Preston; Akim Tamiroff; Lon Chaney Jr.
- Narrated by: Cecil B. DeMille
- Cinematography: W. Howard Greene; Victor Milner
- Edited by: Anne Bauchens
- Music by: Victor Young
- Color process: Technicolor
- Production company: Paramount Pictures
- Distributed by: Paramount Pictures
- Release dates: October 21, 1940 (Canada); November 6, 1940 (New York City)
- Running time: 125 minutes
- Country: United States
- Language: English
- Box office: $2.75 million (U.S. and Canada rentals)

North West Mounted Police is a 1940 American epic north-western film produced and directed by Cecil B. DeMille and starring Gary Cooper and Madeleine Carroll. Written by Alan Le May, Jesse Lasky Jr., and C. Gardner Sullivan, and based on the 1938 novel The Royal Canadian Mounted Police by R. C. Fetherstonhaugh, the film is about a Texas Ranger who joins forces with the North-West Mounted Police to put down a rebellion in the north-west prairies of Canada. The supporting cast features Paulette Goddard, Preston Foster, Robert Preston, Akim Tamiroff, Lon Chaney Jr. and George Bancroft. Regis Toomey, Richard Denning, Rod Cameron, and Robert Ryan make brief appearances in the film playing small roles.

North West Mounted Police was DeMille's first film in Technicolor. The film premiered on October 21, 1940, in Regina, Saskatchewan. The film received an Academy Award for Best Film Editing (Anne Bauchens). (Note: The north-west region that is featured in the film would later become the Province of Saskatchewan.)

== Plot ==
In 1885, Métis leader Dan Duroc and whiskey runner Jacques Courbeau visit politician Louis Riel, exiled in the Montana Territory, and persuade him to return to lead a North-West Rebellion being planned against the Canadian government.

Texas Ranger Dusty Rivers arrives at Fort Carlton in Saskatchewan at the start of the rebellion with a U.S. warrant for Corbeau's arrest. There, he meets and becomes attracted to nurse April Logan, causing rivalry with another suitor, Canadian Mountie Sergeant Jim Brett. Meanwhile, April's brother, Mountie Ronnie Logan, is madly in love with Corbeau's fur-trapper daughter, Louvette. Ronnie's feelings are fully reciprocated, despite them being on opposite sides.

Louvette learns that the rebels plan to attack a lookout post guarded by Ronnie and then ambush a Mounties column moving to seize an abandoned store of ammunition at Duck Lake which would be invaluable to the rebels. By crushing the column, the rebels aim to show wavering Indian forces that the rebellion is worth joining. To keep Ronnie safely out of the ambush, of which he is unaware, Louvette persuades him to leave his post for an hour, and then has him confined by Indians.

Dusty helps the Mounties to mount a rearguard action against the ambushers. Sergeant Jim then leads a small detachment from the fort to the Indian camp where he persuades them to allow him to arrest Corbeau, while Dusty tracks down Louvette's hideout after destroying the rebels' prized Gatling gun. He convinces Ronnie to return to face a desertion charge but Louvette hires an Indian to kill Dusty, whereupon Ronnie, riding Dusty's horse, is killed instead in a case of mistaken identity.

Afterwards, Dusty helps Corbeau to escape the Mounties in order to secretly re-arrest and extradite him. Meeting Jim and April outside the fort, Dusty accepts her decision to stay with Jim and leaves for Texas with his prisoner.

== Cast ==
As appearing in North West Mounted Police, (main roles and screen credits identified):

- Gary Cooper as Texas Ranger Dusty Rivers
- Madeleine Carroll as April Logan
- Paulette Goddard as Louvette Corbeau
- Preston Foster as Sergeant Jim Brett
- Robert Preston as Ronnie Logan
- George Bancroft as Jacques Corbeau
- Lynne Overman as Tod McDuff
- Akim Tamiroff as Dan Duroc
- Walter Hampden as Big Bear
- Lon Chaney Jr. as Shorty
- Montagu Love as Inspector Cabot
- Francis McDonald as Louis Riel
- George E. Stone as Johnny Pelang
- Willard Robertson as Supt. Harrington
- Regis Toomey as Constable Jerry Moore
- Richard Denning as Constable Thornton
- Douglas Kennedy as Constable Carter
- Robert Ryan as Constable Dumont
- Ralph Byrd as Constable Ackroyd
- Rod Cameron as Constable Underhill
- Chief Thundercloud as Wandering Spirit
- David Dunbar as Vitale
- Cecil B. DeMille as Narrator (uncredited)
- Noble Johnson as Indian (uncredited)
- Paul Newlan as Indian (uncredited)
- Emory Parnell as George Higgins (uncredited)

== Production ==
Due to budget restrictions, North West Mounted Police was filmed at sound stages at the Paramount lot as well as on location in Oregon and California, even though the film was based on a real life incident in Saskatchewan, Canada. Principal photography began on March 9, 1940. Although Gary Cooper stars, the lead role was originally given to Joel McCrea, on contract at that time, but Cooper traded roles so that McCrea could star in Foreign Correspondent (1940). DeMille narrated portions of the story, a practice he followed in all of his Technicolor films. (Note: DeMille was unable to complete the narration for the 1958 version of The Buccaneer, in which he, visibly frail at the time due to an ultimately terminal illness, appeared only in the prologue.)

== Reception ==
=== Critical response ===
In homage to the historical region portrayed in North West Mounted Police, the world premiere for the film took place on October 21, 1940, in Regina, Saskatchewan, Canada. The film became Paramount's biggest box-office hit of 1940 and garnered some favourable contemporary reviews from critics, as well. Variety noted: "... scripters weave a story which has its exciting moments, a reasonable and convincing romance ..." Later reviews were much less complimentary. Leonard Maltin called it "DeMille at his most ridiculous ... [a] superficial tale of Texas Ranger searching for fugitive in Canada. Much of outdoor action filmed on obviously indoor sets." North West Mounted Police was listed in the 1978 book The Fifty Worst Films of All Time (1978).

=== Awards and nominations ===
Award	Category	Nominee	Result
Academy Awards	Best Art Direction – Color	Hans Dreier, Roland Anderson	Nominated
Academy Awards	Best Cinematography – Color	Victor Milner, W. Howard Greene	Nominated
Academy Awards	Best Film Editing	Anne Bauchens	Won
Academy Awards	Best Original Score	Victor Young	Nominated
Academy Awards	Best Sound Recording	Loren L. Ryder	Nominated
The Golden Turkey Awards	Worst Line of Romantic Dialogue	an exchange between Gary Cooper and Madeleine Carroll	Won

== Notes ==
=== Bibliography ===
- Arce, Hector. Gary Cooper: An Intimate Biography. New York: Bantam Books, 1980, First edition 1979. ISBN 978-0-553-14130-6.
- Birchard, Robert S. Cecil B. DeMille's Hollywood. Lexington: University Press of Kentucky, 2004. ISBN 978-0-8131-2324-0.
- Martin, Mick and Marsha Porter. Video Movie Guide. New York: Ballantine Books, 1997. ISBN 0-345-42099-3.
- Meyer, Jeffrey. Gary Cooper: American Hero. New York: William Morrow, 1998. ISBN 978-0-688-15494-3.
- Moses, Robert. AMC Classic Movie Companion. New York: Hyperion, 1999. ISBN 978-0-7868-8394-3.
- Swindell, Larry. The Last Hero: A Biography of Gary Cooper. New York: Doubleday, 1980. ISBN 0-385-14316-8
