= The Golden Turkey Awards =

1980 book about bad movies

- First edition
- Authors: Harry Medved; Michael Medved
- Language: English
- Genre: Film
- Publisher: Perigee Trade
- Publication date: 1980; 46 years ago
- Publication place: United States
- Media type: Print (hardback & paperback)

The Golden Turkey Awards is a 1980 book by film critic Michael Medved and his brother Harry Medved, published by Perigee Trade. The book awards satirical "Golden Turkey Awards" to films judged by the authors to be of exceptionally poor quality, as well as to directors and actors deemed to have produced a chronically inept body of work. It covers a wide range of films, from low-budget exploitation pictures to expensive Hollywood failures. The book's reader-voted Worst Film of All Time was Plan 9 from Outer Space by Ed Wood, who also received the Worst Director award. The Golden Turkey Awards formed the basis of a 1983 television series and was followed by a sequel, Son of Golden Turkey Awards, in 1986.

== About ==
The book awards the titular "Golden Turkey Awards" to films judged by the authors as poor in quality, and to directors and actors judged to have created a chronically inept body of work. The book features many low-budget obscurities and exploitation films such as Rat Pfink a Boo Boo, Attack of the 50 Foot Woman, and the apparently lost Him. Other categories include expensive, big studio failures like The Swarm and popular films such as Jesus Christ Superstar.

In the introduction the authors admit that "we know our choices will not please everyone—least of all the actors, producers, writers and directors who are honored in the pages that follow. We further recognize that the number of bad films is so enormous and the competition for the very worst is so intense, that all decisions reached here are subject to considerable second-guessing. Nevertheless, we have researched the subject thoroughly—sitting through more than 2,000 wretched films in the last few years—and we believe that our nominees and award winners can stand the test of time."

The Medveds had previously celebrated bad cinema in the 1978 The Fifty Worst Films of All Time, many of which were also featured in the various Golden Turkey Awards categories. Subsequently, they turned their attention to box office bombs in The Hollywood Hall of Shame. They also published a sequel to The Golden Turkey Awards, Son of Golden Turkey Awards, in 1986. They declared that Son of Golden Turkey Awards "is our last word...we hereby solemnly pledge that the years ahead will produce no further Golden Turkey publications by the Medved Brothers...we now pass the torch to whichever brave souls feel ready to take up the challenge." Son of Golden Turkey Awards also listed a "Who's Who in the World of Bad Movies" at the end of its awards presentations.

The Golden Turkey Awards formed the basis of a 1983 television series The Worst of Hollywood hosted by Michael Medved.

== Awards given ==
In the book The Fifty Worst Films of All Time the authors invited readers to write in nominating their favorite "worst films". More than 3,000 ballots were received. Based on these votes, the Worst Film of All Time award was given to Plan 9 from Outer Space by Ed Wood.

Wood is also awarded the title of Worst Director of All Time, judged by the authors. Raquel Welch is judged the Worst Actress of All Time over nominees including Candice Bergen and Mamie van Doren.

Richard Burton is judged as the Worst Actor of All Time over nominees John Agar, Tony Curtis and Victor Mature. While conceding he is sometimes brilliant, the authors claim Burton's "occasional triumphs only serve to highlight the pathetic waste in most of his films; for every Equus in which he appears there are at least a half-dozen Cleopatras or Boom!s. The authors state that "when he is bad... well, he's just the pits" and list several "bad" films in which he has appeared: The Sandpiper, Hammersmith Is Out, The Voyage, The Medusa Touch and The Assassination of Trotsky. Another Burton film, Exorcist II: The Heretic, is the book's first runner up in the Worst Film of All Time award based on reader response.

== List of Golden Turkey winners ==
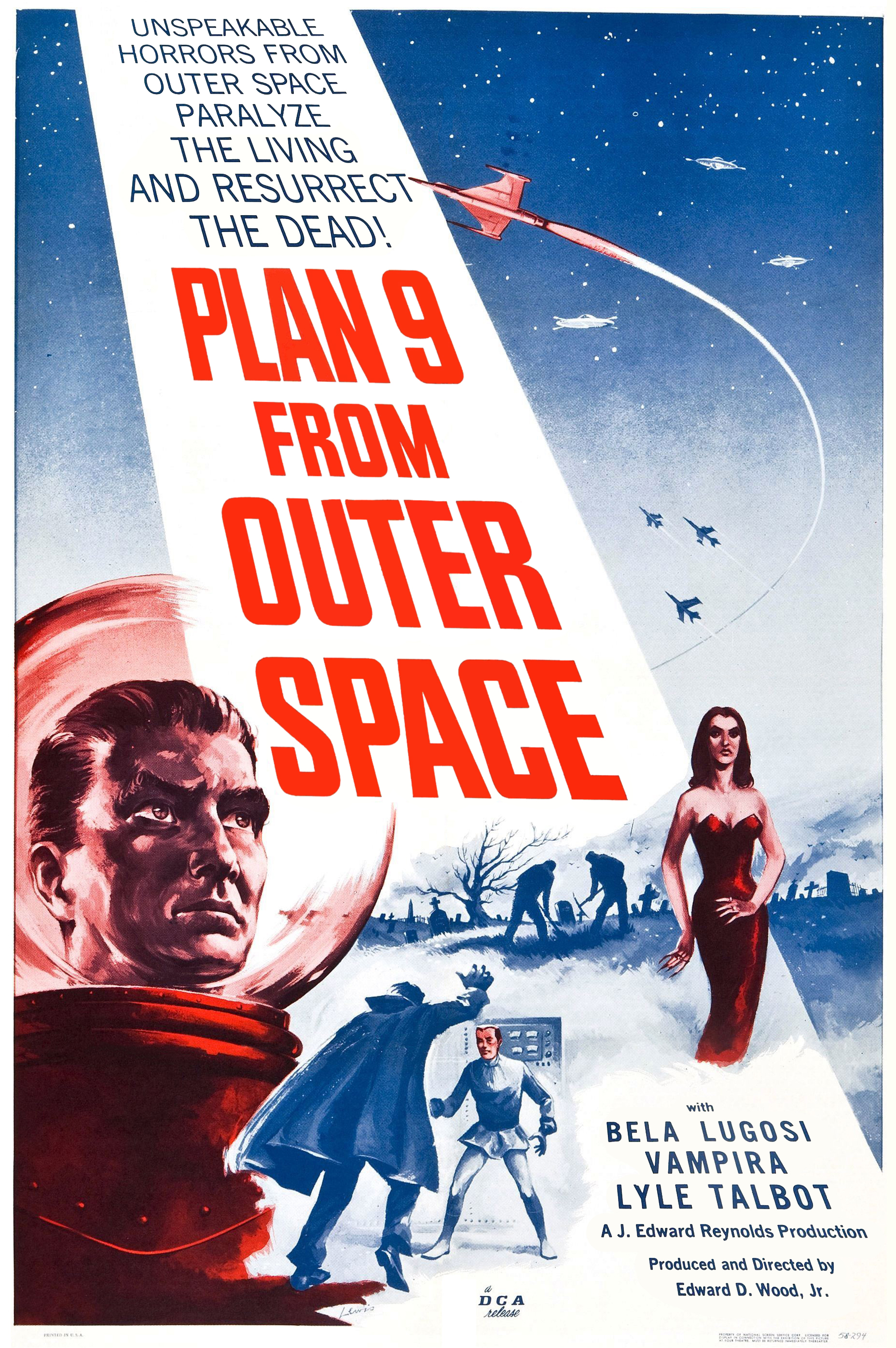
The book's reader-voted Worst Film of All Time was Plan 9 from Outer Space by Ed Wood

- Most Embarrassing Movie Debut: Paul Newman in The Silver Chalice
- Most Ridiculous Movie Monster: Ro-Man from Robot Monster
- Worst Performance by a Popular Singer: Tony Bennett in The Oscar
- Worst Title: Rat Pfink a Boo Boo
- Most Brainless Brain Movie: They Saved Hitler's Brain
- Most 'Badly Bumbled Bee' Movie: The Swarm
- Worst Casting: John Wayne as Genghis Khan in The Conqueror
- Worst Performance by a Politician: United States Congressman and New York City Mayor John Lindsay in Rosebud
- Worst Two-Headed Transplant Movie: The Thing with Two Heads
- Worst Rodent Movie: The Food of the Gods
- Worst Performance by a Novelist: Norman Mailer in Wild 90
- P.T. Barnum Award for Worst Cinematic Exploitation of a Physical Deformity: The Terror of Tiny Town, a Western film with an all-dwarf cast.
- Worst Musical Extravaganza: At Long Last Love
- Worst Performance as a Clergyman or Nun: Mary Tyler Moore in Change of Habit
- Worst Performance as Jesus Christ: Ted Neeley in Jesus Christ Superstar
- Worst Blaxploitation Movie: Scream Blacula Scream
- Biggest Rip-off in Hollywood History: The 1976 version of King Kong
- Worst Credit Line: The 1929 version of William Shakespeare's The Taming of the Shrew, "with additional dialogue by Sam Taylor" (this credit does not appear in the surviving prints of the film).
- Most Unerotic Concept in Pornography: Him, a porn film about a priest with a sexual fixation on Jesus Christ
- Worst Performance by an Animal: Dinky the Chimp in Tarzan and the Great River. (During filming, Dinky attacked and injured lead actor Mike Henry.)
- Worst Vegetable Movie: Attack of the Mushroom People
- Worst Performance by Sonny Tufts: Government Girl
- Most Ludicrous Racial Impersonation: Marlon Brando as a native of Okinawa in The Teahouse of the August Moon
- Most Obnoxious Child Performer: David Kory in Dondi
- Worst Film You Never Saw (category for films never completed or only released in a limited fashion): Billy Jack Goes to Washington
- Most Inane Technical Advance: Percepto, designed by William Castle for his 1959 film, The Tingler starring Vincent Price. At certain times in the film small vibrators attached to the underside of some seats within the auditorium were activated to give some audience members a tingle.
- Worst Line of Romantic Dialogue: an exchange between Gary Cooper and Madeleine Carroll in Northwest Mounted Police
- Worst Director: Ed Wood
- Worst Actress: Raquel Welch
- Worst Actor: Richard Burton (a highly controversial choice, considering that he was a seven-time Oscar nominee, noted Shakespearean performer and widely considered one of the world's greatest actors, but made because Burton starred in so many bad films)

In addition, the Golden Turkey Awards had a reader's choice category for Worst Film of All Time, voted upon by readers of The Fifty Worst Films of All Time.

- First Runner-Up: Exorcist II: The Heretic
- Worst Film: Plan 9 from Outer Space

== Hoax film ==
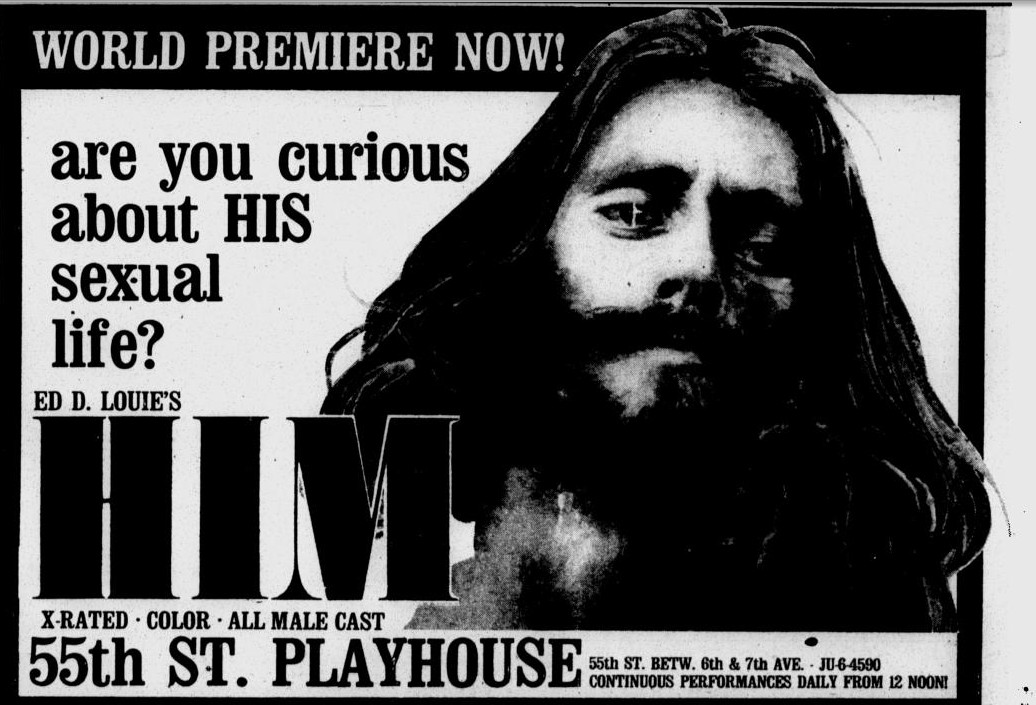
While the fake film was Dog of Norway, another film in the book, the now-lost 1974 porn film Him (pictured), has also been cited as the hoax, though it is definitely known to have existed.

One of the films nominated in the book was in fact an invention of the authors, and the book's readers were challenged by them to figure out which film was actually fake. The fake film was Dog of Norway featuring "Muki the Wonder Hound". This film was illustrated using a photo of a co-author's pet dog. The giveaway was that the same dog was in the photo of the authors in the back of the book. Another film in the book, the now-lost 1974 porn film Him, has also been cited as the hoax, though it is definitely known to have existed.

No formal clarification of the hoax film was provided by the subsequent release, The Hollywood Hall of Shame. That book again features the same dog pictured with the authors (as did the subsequent Son of Golden Turkey Awards). In The Hollywood Hall of Shame, in reference to the dish barbecued dog, the authors explain that it was "a snack which produced a mixed reaction among the representatives of an industry that had given the world Lassie, Rin Tin Tin, Benji, Phyllis Diller, and Muki the Wonder Hound."

The "Acknowledgements" page of The Fifty Worst Films of All Time ends with:

And love, most of all, to Muki, who was there to understand when the going got rough.

== Reception ==
Betsa Marsh wrote for the Gannett News Service, "In their breezy, irreverent style, bristling with puns and sarcasm, the Medveds take us from one debacle to another... It's a great book to keep with your TV Guide, in your bathroom or even on your coffee table, to impress your friends with your impeccably bad taste."

Some critics took exception to the book's style; Kenneth Tucker wrote, "The line between the witty and the arrogant is indeed hard to draw. At times to me, however, the commentary degenerates into smugness or becomes unnecessarily waspish."

In Film Comment, J. Hoberman was quite hostile, describing The Fifty Worst Films of All Time and The Golden Turkey Awards as "a pair of humorous non-books researched by teenaged Harry Medved and written by his older brother Michael. The Medved position—if we discount its patina of Mad Magazine masochism and resolve to stomach their facetious tone—also suggests that the best bad movies are akin to masterpieces."

== See also ==
- Golden Raspberry Awards
- Stinkers Bad Movie Awards
- List of films considered the worst
