= The Wrecking Crew (Frank book) =

2008 book by Thomas Frank

The Wrecking Crew: How Conservatives Rule
- First edition cover
- Author: Thomas Frank
- Subject: History; United States; political analysis; social criticism; political science; politics and government; conservatism
- Publisher: Henry Holt and Company
- Publication date: August 5, 2008
- Publication place: United States
- Media type: Print (hardcover)
- Pages: 384
- ISBN: 978-0-8050-7988-3
- Dewey Decimal: 973.92 22
- LC Class: JK2356 .F72 2008

The Wrecking Crew: How Conservatives Rule (August 2008) is a book written by American journalist and historian Thomas Frank, which explores the contemporary state of conservative-governed Washington, D.C. Frank summarized the message of his book: "Bad government is the natural product of rule by those who believe government is bad." Frank argues that certain elements of the Republican Party intentionally dismantled the government by many means, including turning public policy into a private sector feeding frenzy. Frank describes the state of the federal government of the United States as analogous to a large group of privatized pigs feeding at the public trough, which was brought on by the privatization schemes engineered by the Republicans. This book follows Frank's New York Times bestseller, What's the Matter with Kansas?

In some Commonwealth of Nations territories, it was published with the subtitle The American Right and the Lust for Power. A year after its first appearance, the second edition of the book came out in its native United States with the new subtitle How Conservatives Ruined Government, Enriched Themselves, and Beggared the Nation.
