= One Market Under God =

2000 book by Thomas Frank

- First edition cover
- Author: Thomas Frank
- Language: English
- Genre: Non-fiction
- Publication date: 2000

One Market Under God: Extreme Capitalism, Market Populism, and the End of Economic Democracy is a 2000 book by historian and author Thomas Frank. It was published by Anchor Books.

The book traces the development of what Frank decries as market populism: "the idea that markets are a far more democratic form of organization than democratically elected governments." He also discusses many facets of the New Economy, "culture studs," and internet brokerages.

An excerpt of the book was the cover story of the October 12, 2000 issue of The Nation.

== Summary ==
=== Television commercials ===
One topic that Frank devotes considerable page space to is television commercials, especially those for brokerages and mutual funds. He cites many examples of corporations being compared to rock stars, the Civil Rights Movement and the French Revolution and God.

=== Beardstown Ladies ===
Frank discusses the Beardstown Ladies, an informal investment group comprising elderly women from Beardstown, Illinois. He covers their usage by the media to promote the idea (mostly fallacious, in Frank's estimation) that Average Joe Americans were just as good as, if not better than, professionals at picking stocks.

== Reception ==
It was reviewed in The American Prospect on December 18, 2000, in The New York Times on December 21, 2000
