= Nancy Bermeo =

American political scientist, and professor

- Born: 1951
- Occupation: Senior Research Fellow

Academic background
- Education: Mount Holyoke College (BA); Yale University (PhD)

Academic work
- Discipline: Political science
- Sub-discipline: Comparative politics
- Institutions: Oxford University; Princeton University
- Main interests: Regime change; Political parties; Political mobilization; Democracy

Nancy Bermeo (born 1951) is an American political scientist who is currently a Senior Research Fellow at Nuffield College, University of Oxford and an Emeritus Professor of Politics at Princeton University and Oxford University. She studies and writes on regime change, challenges to democracy, mass mobilization, and systemic political shocks.

== Education ==
Bermeo spent a year studying at Dartmouth College as an undergraduate during the 1971-72 academic year, as the college was transitioning to mixed-sex education, and finished her undergraduate studies at Mount Holyoke College, majoring in political science and graduating summa cum laude in 1973.

After graduation, Bermeo worked in Washington, DC from 1973-75 as a research assistant at Gladstone Associates, a real estate development and economic consulting firm. She then returned to academia, with a full fellowship from Yale University; she was awarded a Fulbright grant as well as a Social Science Research Council grant for doctoral fieldwork in Portugal in 1977, and was granted her political science PhD with distinction in 1982.

== Career in Academia ==
=== Princeton ===
After a brief stint as a lecturer at Dartmouth during 1981-82, Bermeo joined the faculty of Princeton University as an assistant professor in 1983. In 1986, she published her first book, The Revolution Within the Revolution: Workers' Control in Rural Portugal, which examined the rise and fall of rural agricultural cooperatives in southern Portugal following the 1974 Carnation Revolution; the book was greeted with positive reviews in the academic press and was praised by Fritz Stern for "transcending the bounds of its subject" and demonstrating the "great potential of the scholarly monograph".

In 1989, Bermeo was made an associate professor. She published a number of articles and co-edited volumes, served as the interim chair of the politics department, and received the Stanley Kelley Teaching Award in 1998; in 2001, she was given the rank of full professor.

In 2003, Bermeo published Ordinary People in Extraordinary Times: The Citizenry and Collapse of Democracy, a comparative study of 17 countries across Europe and Latin America that underwent democratic collapse. Ordinary People argues that the actions of political elites, rather than mass publics, directly lead to the decline and fall of democratic regimes. Ordinary People won the Best Book award from the democratization section of the American Political Science Association in 2004 and won widespread positive reviews from academics such as Alfred Stepan, who declared "comparative politics needs more books like this".

=== Oxford ===
In 2007, Bermeo left Princeton to become the Nuffield Chair of Comparative Politics at the University of Oxford. There, she received the Teaching Excellence Award in 2009 and became the founding Director of the Oxford University Center for the Study of Inequality and Democracy. She co-edited two volumes about the response to the Great Recession, Coping with Crisis: Government Reactions to the Great Recession (2012, with Jonas Pontusson) and Mass Politics in Tough Times (2014, with Larry Bartels) as well as Parties, Movements and Democracy in the Developing World (2016, with Deborah Yashar). Her longstanding concern with regime change is embodied in a "seminal" 2016 work titled “On Democratic Backsliding” in the Journal of Democracy. In 2022, Bermeo was elected to the American Academy of Arts and Sciences.
