= Hollywood vs. America =

Book by Michael Medved

Hollywood vs. America: Popular Culture and the War on Traditional Values
- First edition
- Author: Michael Medved
- Language: English
- Genre: Social Trends, Popular Culture, cultural relativism
- Publisher: HarperCollins
- Publication date: October 1992
- Publication place: United States
- Pages: 400 p. (hardback edition), 416 p. (paperback edition)
- ISBN: 006016882X (Hardback), ISBN 0060924357 (Paperback)
- Preceded by: The Hollywood Hall of Shame: The Most Expensive Flops in Movie History
- Followed by: Saving Childhood: Protecting Our Children from the National Assault on Innocence

Hollywood vs. America: Popular Culture and the War on Traditional Values is a 1992 book by conservative film critic Michael Medved.

== Summary ==
Its purpose is an examination and condemnation of violence and sexuality in cinema, as well as other media, such as TV and rock music. Medved argued in the book that since the 1960s, American popular culture, especially Hollywood cinema, had been producing art that was excessively violent, sexual and disrespectful to authority, and that such art was having a harmful effect on American society. The book's evidence relies heavily on the Lichter & Rothman book Watching America and the 1990 conference "The Impact of the Media on Children and the Family" to conclude that violence in cinema has a negative impact on American culture, especially by motivating viewers to mimic the violence they see on the screen. The book was praised by George Gilder in its American edition.

== Reception ==
In his book Movies About the Movies, film historian Christopher Ames took issue with Hollywood vs. America. Ames described the book's viewpoint as overly simplistic, and argued that it exhibited "virtually no awareness of the function of fantasy and vicarious experience… That audiences might have complex reasons for viewing behavior they do not wish to emulate or experience firsthand eludes Medved."

Charles Oliver, reviewing the book for the libertarian monthly magazine, Reason, took issue with many of Medved's arguments. Oliver stated the commercial failure of Star Trek V: The Final Frontier was due to the fact "it was simply the worst of the series", not because of Medved's statement that audiences objected to what Medved claimed as the anti-religious tone of the film. Oliver pointed out themes like anti-heroes, crime and adultery had been staples of the American film industry since the 1940s, citing films like Double Indemnity and White Heat. Oliver also stated, "Medved never once considers the idea that maybe adultery is a powerful dramatic theme-powerful because we value marriage so much".

In the liberal magazine, The New Republic, the then-film critic for The New Yorker magazine, David Denby, wrote that Hollywood vs. America "is the stupidest book about popular culture that I have read to the end."

John Podhoretz in the conservative magazine Commentary praised the book, stating: "The central point of Hollywood vs. America is, however, unassailable: not only is there a gaping chasm between Hollywood's America and the real America, but Hollywood seems willing to pay in the coin of reduced profits for its continual refusal to bridge the chasm".

Hollywood vs America was criticized in two articles by Brian Siano in the January 1993 issue of The Humanist magazine as being a case of Medved trying to exaggerate in order to make his point.

The English novelist Martin Amis agreed with some of Medved's points about violence affecting young audiences, while still ultimately rejecting Medved's argument, saying violence was an inevitable part of any artistic medium.

== See also ==
- Media violence
- Culture wars
