= Roland Anderson =

American movie art director (1903–1989)

- Born: November 18, 1903; Boston, Massachusetts, United States
- Died: October 29, 1989 (aged 85); Los Angeles, California, United States
- Occupation: Art director
- Years active: 1932–1969
- Spouse: Dorthee (?-?)

Roland Anderson (November 18, 1903 – October 29, 1989) was an American movie art director. He received 15 Academy Award nominations but never won an Oscar. Anderson's first Oscar nomination was for his first film in 1933, A Farewell to Arms. A frequent collaborator with Cecil B. DeMille, he worked on Cleopatra (1934), The Buccaneer (1938) and North West Mounted Police (1940), as well as such other classics as Holiday Inn (1942), Road to Utopia (1946), Son of Paleface (1952) and Will Penny (1967).

Those 15 nominations were for:

- A Farewell to Arms (1933)
- The Lives of a Bengal Lancer (1935)
- Souls at Sea (1937)
- North West Mounted Police (1940)
- Take a Letter Darling (1942)
- Reap the Wild Wind (1942)
- Love Letters (1945)
- Carrie (1952)
- The Country Girl (1954)
- Red Garters (1954)
- It Started in Naples (1960)
- Breakfast at Tiffany's (1961)
- The Pigeon That Took Rome (1962)
- Love with the Proper Stranger (1963)
- Come Blow Your Horn (1963)
