= Just How Stupid Are We? =

2008 political book by Rick Shenkman

- Author: Rick Shenkman
- Language: English
- Genre: Non-fiction, politics
- Publisher: Basic Books
- Publication date: June 2008
- Publication place: United States
- ISBN: 978-0465014934

Just How Stupid Are We? Facing the Truth About the American Voter is a political book by author Rick Shenkman published by Basic Books in June 2008. (ISBN 978-0465014934)

The book argues that although the American government has gained global political power since the late 19th century, American voters have become increasingly ignorant of politics and world affairs and are dangerously susceptible to political manipulation. The book claims that Americans are largely incapable of critically assessing domestic and international issues, and therefore lack the knowledge and ability to participate effectively in the political process or to select political leaders in line with the national or even their own best interests. Shenkman argues that voters are repeatedly and systematically misled and manipulated by politicians, and he analyzes the "dumbing down" of American politics arising from the saturation of marketing, spin machines and misinformation in American political culture.

== See also ==
- The American Voter
- What's the Matter with Kansas?
- Politainment
