= Politainment =

Portmanteau

Politainment, a portmanteau word composed of politics and entertainment, describes tendencies in politics and mass media to liven up political reports and news coverage using elements from public relations to create a new kind of political communication. Politainment, while outwardly emphasizing the political aspects of the information communicated, nevertheless draws heavily upon techniques from pop culture and journalism to make complex information more accessible or convincing and distract public attention from politically unfavorable topics. The interdependencies of politicians and media are known as the politico-media complex.

Of doubtful virtue, declining amounts of content and substance can easily be compensated by giving news stories a sensationalistic twinge. Sensationalism in the news can be traced back to the Muckrakers in 1905, they set out to reform journalism and public perception of injustices. Politainment thus ranges on the same level as edu- and infotainment.

Typical catchlines in politainment reports or media will at times bluntly argue ad hominem in a generalizing manner and try to emphasize virtues and charisma ("xyz will Make America Great Again") or vices and weaknesses (by denunciation: "xyz will wreck this country", "lynching", etc.). The latter example is also known as fear appeal. More moderate forms make extensive use of imprecise, metaphoric language (allegories, metonymy, periphrases, kennings etc.).

Politainment can be both a communication aspect of (1) politicians and spin doctors to their and their party's own advantage and the political adversary's disadvantage or (2) a strategy for news publishers, journalists, etc., to promote their medium and journalistic work.

Politainment may be a factor in party identification, mass-influencing voter's choices, it has thus become an indispensable tool in political campaigns and elections. As such it can also be one of the—seemingly innocuous—ingredients of crowd manipulation up to political psychological warfare.

== Examples of politainment in the United States ==
=== Pre-1970s ===
==== Franklin Delano Roosevelt's fireside chats ====
From March 1933 to June 1944, Franklin Delano Roosevelt would address the nation roughly thirty times via radio, in what would become known as "fireside chats."

The 1930s saw radio broadcasting at its peak, before the development of television broadcasting introduced competition for the public's attention; by 1934, shortly into FDR's presidency, sixty percent of households had radios.

Through this rapid rise, FDR became the first president to speak to the public directly, unfitted through the media. Not only were these messages informational, but they were entertaining. Though these chats were calculated and scripted, FDR spoke casually with simple language, and often called upon well known references to connect with audiences. Fireside chats allowed him to reach faucets of the public that may have previously been excluded, such as illiterate individuals.

Fireside chats became something the American public willing wanted to tune into. Often out rating the commercial comedies or dramas that were broadcast alongside them, fireside chats became a form of entertainment, while also educating the public and gaining public trust.

=== 1970s–2000 ===
==== Saturday Night Live ====
Ever since Saturday Night Live debuted in the fall of 1975, it earned fans' trust in part by speaking truth to power. "SNL" was an equal opportunity offender, mocking Democrats and Republicans mercilessly, and making judgment calls about their foibles that traditional media either couldn't or shouldn't.

Presidential impersonations are one of the defining features of the show. Each cast member on the show fights for the position of the impersonation of a president or candidate to earn more air-time. For example, Tina Fey's impersonation of Sarah Palin was so good that even though she wasn't a current cast member, Fey was a common cameo throughout the 2008 election. Fey's impersonation also decreased Palin's popularity dramatically.

What started out as a pure entertainment, has crossed over into the realm of real media and information. Many scholars ask, what happens when entertainment becomes not just a tool to engage and communicate, as it has in the past, but the defining and driving component of a contest to win an office that also involves making substantial decisions about domestic and international affairs?

=== 2010–present day ===
Twitter

Twitter has become an important platform for political communication in recent years. Roughly one-quarter of American adults use Twitter. In 2020 and 2021, one-third of English-language tweets were political in nature. The majority of these political tweets are produced by a minority of users, specifically, those 50 and older. Former president Donald Trump used Twitter prolifically during his campaign and presidency. He sent more than 26,000 tweets throughout his presidency which provided a continuous account of his thinking on a variety of issues. He was eventually banned from the platform but rejoined recently after Twitter rebranded as X.

== Examples of politainment outside of the United States ==
=== Peru ===
TikTok has become one of the most used social media platforms for specifically Generation Z, but the reach has spread among all generations. As of July 2023, 37.3% of TikTok users are between the ages of 18 and 24. The mass use of this app has created concerns regarding how it is used in elections and rallying voters through short clips. In Peru, politicians have turned to TikTok in an effort to reach their very young voter base. In the last election, many candidates took to promoting themselves on TikTok as a means of simply getting their message out. Although in Peru, TikTok may not have been as successful as politicians had hoped, their use of the platform demonstrated a cultural shift in how politainment is used to reach audiences of many ages.

=== Mexico ===
In Mexico, politainment has emerged on YouTube as an accessible avenue for journalists and the public to discuss politics in new ways outside of the mainstream media. Most political entertainment YouTube channels in Mexico are run by independent commentators.The need for these political entertainment channels that are more based in cultural and comedic values is rooted in the distrust in mainstream news channels. These new outlets that offer news mixed with political entertainment helps to create an environment in which people can feel at ease that they are receiving unbiased news while also enjoying what they are watching.

== See also ==
- Amusing Ourselves to Death
- Anti-intellectualism in American Life
- Fake news
- Fox Nation
- Grassroots
- Just How Stupid Are We?
- Misinformation
- Panem et circenses
- Political satire
- Populism
- Propaganda
- Steve Colbert
- Yellow press

== Literature ==
- David Schultz (2012). Politainment: The Ten Rules of Contemporary Politics: A citizens' guide to understanding campaigns and elections. ISBN 978-0615594200.
