= The Fifty Worst Films of All Time =

1978 book by Harry Medved and Randy Dreyfuss

- First edition
- Author: Harry Medved; Randy Dreyfuss; Michael Medved
- Language: English
- Genre: Movies
- Publisher: Popular Library
- Publication date: 1978
- Publication place: United States
- Media type: Print (hardback and paperback)

The Fifty Worst Films of All Time (and How They Got That Way) is a 1978 book by Harry Medved with Randy Dreyfuss. Despite its broad title, it presents the authors' choices for the 50 worst sound films made or distributed in the United States. Each film's entry includes a story synopsis, the authors' opinions of its quality, and a selection of contemporary reviews of the film.

== Categories ==
In compiling their list, the authors divided films into several categories:

- "Popular Triumphs" such as The Omen, Valley of the Dolls
- "Overrated Art Films" such as Ivan the Terrible, Last Year at Marienbad
- "Implausible Oddities" such as The Terror of Tiny Town
- "Big Budget Flops" such as Lost Horizon, Zabriskie Point
- "Grade-Z Atrocities" such as Robot Monster, Eegah
- "Tarnished Stars" such as Yul Brynner in Solomon and Sheba
- "Oldies but Baddies" such as Jamaica Inn

== Subcategories ==
The authors also used egregious examples to represent less reputable film genres, such as blaxploitation films (Trouble Man), Japanese monster movies (Godzilla vs. Hedorah), spaghetti Westerns (Return of Sabata) and Tarzanesque jungle movies (Daughter of the Jungle) alongside anime (Alakazam the Great), disaster movies (Airport 1975), sexploitation films (Myra Breckinridge), Elvis Presley vehicles (Spinout), and mainstream films such as At Long Last Love, Bring Me the Head of Alfredo Garcia, Hurry Sundown, King Richard and the Crusaders, and Say One for Me.

== Criteria ==
The book intentionally excludes silent films because the authors consider them to be "a separate and unique art form and that judging them alongside talkies would be like weighing apples together with oranges." It limits the foreign films considered to only those distributed in the United States, judging it unfair to evaluate local obscurities denied an international release alongside mainstream Hollywood products while realizing that it would not only be difficult for the authors to view the films, but unlikely that any readers would ever come across them.

== Reception ==
Despite the popularity of the book among some members of the general public, film scholars and historians largely denounce the book for its lack of understanding and perspective. Acclaimed film historian William K. Everson wrote a scathing review in Films in Review: "There are so many factual errors and sweepingly inaccurate generalizations that to list them all would take a volume of the same size.... The authors of the book are both teen-agers. This is hardly their fault. And some often remarkable writing has been done by teen-agers. But NOT in any field of historical research, where experience and the perspective that can ONLY come about by years in a chosen field, are absolute essentials.... If nothing else, The 50 Worst Movies Of All Time unquestionably qualifies as The Worst Movie Book Of All Time—and in view of the mediocrity being spewed forth these days, that in itself is a monumental achievement." Critic Hal Erickson wrote, "How easy it is to tear something down. A child of four can do it."

== Legacy ==
The Medveds continued the theme of "celebrating" bad cinema with the publication The Golden Turkey Awards, instituted in 1980 which again showcased bad and obscure films, and The Hollywood Hall of Shame which examined in some detail several major Hollywood financial disasters, focusing on both the artistic treatments coupled with the technical and organizational ineptitude in the mounting of these films.

It has been said that The Fifty Worst Films of All Time marked the beginning of an explosion of "worst in cinema" prizes nearly resulting in "a state of redundancy almost approaching that of ordinary prizes."

== The films ==
Title	Year	Director	Studio
Abraham Lincoln	1930	D. W. Griffith	United Artists
Parnell	1937	John M. Stahl	Metro-Goldwyn-Mayer
The Goldwyn Follies	1938	George Marshall	Samuel Goldwyn Productions
Swing Your Lady	1938	Ray Enright	Warner Bros.
The Terror of Tiny Town	1938	Sam Newfield	Columbia Pictures
Jamaica Inn	1939	Alfred Hitchcock	Mayflower Pictures
New Moon	1940	Robert Z. Leonard	Metro-Goldwyn-Mayer
North West Mounted Police	1940	Cecil B. DeMille	Paramount Pictures
The Big Noise	1944	Mal St. Clair	20th Century Fox
Ivan the Terrible	1945	Sergei Eisenstein	Mosfilm
Dick Tracy vs. Cueball	1946	Gordon M. Douglas	RKO Radio Pictures
That Hagen Girl	1947	Peter Godfrey	Warner Bros.
Twilight on the Rio Grande	1947	Frank McDonald	Republic Pictures
Daughter of the Jungle	1949	George Blair	Republic Pictures
Robot Monster	1953	Phil Tucker	Astor Pictures
King Richard and the Crusaders	1954	David Butler	Warner Bros.
Swamp Women	1955	Roger Corman	Woolner Brothers Pictures Inc.
The Conqueror	1956	Dick Powell	RKO Radio Pictures
The Story of Mankind	1957	Irwin Allen	Warner Bros.
Jet Attack	1958	Edward L. Cahn	American International Pictures
Say One for Me	1959	Frank Tashlin	20th Century Fox
Solomon and Sheba	1959	King Vidor	United Artists
Alakazam the Great	1960	Taiji Yabushita; Daisaku Shirakawa	Toei Company
Dondi	1961	Albert Zugsmith	Allied Artists
Last Year at Marienbad	1961	Alain Resnais	Cocinor
Eegah	1962	Arch Hall Sr. (credited as Nicholas Merriweather)	Fairway International Pictures
The Horror of Party Beach	1964	Del Tenney	20th Century Fox
Santa Claus Conquers the Martians	1964	Nicholas Webster	Embassy Pictures
Boy, Did I Get a Wrong Number!	1966	George Marshall	United Artists
Spinout	1966	Norman Taurog	Metro-Goldwyn-Mayer
Three on a Couch	1966	Jerry Lewis	Columbia Pictures
The Ambushers	1967	Henry Levin	Columbia Pictures
Hurry Sundown	1967	Otto Preminger	Paramount Pictures
Valley of the Dolls	1967	Mark Robson	20th Century Fox
A Place for Lovers	1968	Vittorio De Sica	Metro-Goldwyn-Mayer
Che!	1969	Richard Fleischer	20th Century Fox
Myra Breckinridge	1970	Michael Sarne	20th Century Fox
Zabriskie Point	1970	Michelangelo Antonioni	Metro-Goldwyn-Mayer
Godzilla vs. the Smog Monster	1971	Yoshimitsu Banno	Toho
The Last Movie	1971	Dennis Hopper	Universal Pictures
Return of Sabata	1971	Gianfranco Parolini	United Artists
The Assassination of Trotsky	1972	Joseph Losey	Cinerama Releasing Corporation
Trouble Man	1972	Ivan Dixon	20th Century Fox
Jonathan Livingston Seagull	1973	Hall Bartlett	Paramount Pictures
Lost Horizon	1973	Charles Jarrott	Columbia Pictures
Bring Me the Head of Alfredo Garcia	1974	Sam Peckinpah	United Artists
The Trial of Billy Jack	1974	Tom Laughlin	Warner Bros.
Airport 1975	1974	Jack Smight	Universal Pictures
At Long Last Love	1975	Peter Bogdanovich	20th Century Fox
The Omen	1976	Richard Donner	20th Century Fox

== See also ==
- List of films considered the worst
- Cult film
- B movie
- Mystery Science Theater 3000
- Golden Raspberry Awards
