= David Stoesz =

American academic and author

- Occupations: academic, policy analyst, social entrepreneur, author
- Awards: Fulbright Distinguished Chair awards, UK (2014), Australia (2017)

Academic background
- Education: Master of Social Work (1976), Ph.D. (1980)
- Alma mater: University of Maryland (1980)

Academic work
- Discipline: Social policy
- Sub-discipline: Child welfare, national politics
- Institutions: San Diego State University, Virginia Commonwealth University
- Main interests: Social policy, child welfare, international development, and national politics
- Notable works: American Social Welfare Policy, 9th ed. (2022), Welfare State 3.0: Social Policy After the Pandemic (2021)

David Stoesz (/steɪs/) is an American academic, policy analyst, author, and social entrepreneur. Stoesz worked as a welfare caseworker and welfare department director and has published about social policy, child welfare, international development, and national politics. He earned his PhD at the University of Maryland-Baltimore in 1980, subsequently teaching at San Diego State University and Virginia Commonwealth University where he served as Samuel Wurtzel Professor of Social Work. He is a professor emeritus in the Virginia Commonwealth School of Social Work, and a founder of Up$tart, a company whose products assist US college students in applying for federal benefits.

Stoesz's book, Quixote’s Ghost: The Right, the Liberati, and the Future of Social Policy received the Prohumanitate Literary Award.

In 2010 Stoesz was inducted into the National Academy of Social Insurance.

== Bibliography ==
=== Books ===
- Meritocracy, Populism, and the Future of Democracy (2022)
- Welfare State 3.0: Social Policy After the Pandemic (2021)
- Building Better Social Programs: How Evidence is Transforming Public Policy (2020)
- The Investment State (2018)
- The Dynamic Welfare State (2017)
- Quixote's Ghost: The Right, the Liberati, and the Future of Social Policy (2005) ISBN 9780195181203
- A poverty of imagination: Bootstrap capitalism, sequel to welfare reform (2000)
- The Politics of Child Abuse in America (with Lela B. Costin and Howard Jacob Karger, Oxford University Press, 1996)
- Reconstructing the American Welfare State (with Howard Jacob Karger, Rowman & Littlefield, 1992)

=== As an editor or co-author ===
- American Social Welfare Policy, 9th ed. (2022) co-authored with Howard Karger ISBN 9780137472246
- Stoesz, David, Howard Jacob Karger, and Terry E. Carrillo. "A dream deferred: How social work education lost its way and what can be done." (2011).
- Karger, Howard Jacob, and David Stoesz. American social welfare policy. Allyn and Bacon, 2009.

=== Articles ===
- Stoesz, David. "Evidence-based policy: Reorganizing social services through accountable care organizations and social impact bonds." Research on Social Work Practice 24, no. 2 (2014): 181–185.
- Karger, Howard Jacob, and David Stoesz. "The growth of social work education programs, 1985-1999: Its impact on economic and educational factors related to the profession of social work." Journal of Social Work Education 39, no. 2 (2003): 279–295.
- Stoesz, David, and Howard Jacob Karger. "Deconstructing welfare: The Reagan legacy and the welfare state." Social Work 38, no. 5 (1993): 619–628.

== Awards ==
Stoesz has received two Fulbright Distinguished Chair awards: in 2014 to the UK, in 2017 to Australia.
