= Listen, Liberal =

2016 Thomas Frank book about U.S. Democratic Party political shift

- Author: Thomas Frank
- Published: 2016 (Metropolitan Books)
- Media type: Print
- Pages: 320
- ISBN: 978-1-62779-539-5

Listen, Liberal: Or, What Ever Happened to the Party of the People? is a 2016 book by American author Thomas Frank. In the book, Frank argues that the American Democratic Party has changed over time to support elitism in the form of a professional class instead of the working class, facilitating the growth of what he considers deleterious economic inequality. Frank was one of the few analysts who foresaw that Donald Trump could win the 2016 United States presidential election.

== Summary ==
Frank argues that the Democratic Party has represented the interests of the upper middle class, specifically professionals with high educational attainment. As a cohort, professionals transitioned from showing heavy political support for the Republican Party in the 1950s to heavy support for the Democrats four decades later. The majority of American adults do not have college degrees; Frank refers to them as the working class. Frank argues that most professionals' economic policy preferences are associated with technocracy and fiscal conservatism, especially opposition to trade union activity. He also contends that most professionals tend to show instinctive deference to "expert opinion", ready forgiveness of those designated as experts even if they make regular or major errors, willful ignorance of "predatory behavior if it comes cloaked in the signifiers of professionalism", and "obsessive pining for consensus" among themselves.

Although the McGovern–Fraser Commission reformed the Democratic National Committee's process to nominate presidential candidates in 1971 by making it more open to people who were not full-time political workers, it failed to secure representation for working-class people as such among the party's delegates. Frank argues that commission member Fred Dutton's book Changing Sources of Power, published in that year, inspired later movements by the Democratic Party to reinvent itself in opposition to its former New Deal legacy in one way or another: unionized labor, previously key to Democratic success, was now treated as a hindrance to the same. Following the failure of George McGovern's own presidential campaign in 1972, Democrats began to reject New Deal liberalism and pursue center-right politics, especially becoming economic neoliberals. The neoliberal Democratic Leadership Council argued that Democratic presidential candidates Jimmy Carter (in 1980, when he ran for re-election as president), Walter Mondale (in 1984), and Michael Dukakis (in 1988) lost national elections because they were too close to the New Deal to succeed in an increasingly conservative country. Frank, however, describes Carter, Mondale, and Dukakis as having all taken steps towards neoliberalism.

Frank criticizes Democratic presidents Bill Clinton and Barack Obama throughout the book for what he considers their subscription to the conventional wisdom of the "free market" age. Both Clinton and Obama relied on advice from people who had worked or later would work in investment banking. In practice their political triangulation led to solidification of economic conservatism as the federal government's policy. Clinton was elected president in 1992 after criticizing spikes in poverty and inequality during the presidencies of Republican leaders Ronald Reagan and George H. W. Bush, but he governed as a "New Democrat". Frank contends that measures passed during the Clinton administration such as the North American Free Trade Agreement (1993), the Violent Crime Control and Law Enforcement Act (1994), the Personal Responsibility and Work Opportunity Act (1996), the Telecommunications Act of 1996, and the Commodity Futures Modernization Act of 2000 exacerbated poverty, inequality, or both. Due to widespread Democratic opposition to these changes, Clinton worked extensively with Republicans in the United States Congress to pass them. Frank describes Clinton's presidential activity as "capitulation" to a radical free market agenda, a step that was as necessary for that agenda's triumph as arguments in its favor and political events like Reagan's electoral victories.

Like Bill Clinton, Obama was elected as president in 2008 in a milieu of populist discontent with the arrangement of the American economy; his election coincided with the 2008 financial crisis. Obama promised Wall Street reform, but he triangulated as president as well, albeit in a slightly different way: the American Recovery and Reinvestment Act of 2009, the Dodd–Frank Wall Street Reform and Consumer Protection Act (2010), and the Affordable Care Act (2010), which Frank describes as being his three greatest legislative victories, were deliberately written to be complex. In Frank's words, this practice "diminishes their effectiveness but allows Democrats to pursue the professional consensus they crave."

Frank disagrees with counterarguments that Democrats pursued the economic policies they did because of Republican pressure: he says that Democrats enacted similar measures in states where they governed with much less opposition, like Delaware, New York, Rhode Island, and especially Massachusetts. Massachusetts is one of the most unequal states in the United States: while Boston, a major city rich in professional work, flourishes, the small, deindustrialized city of Fall River languishes. Entrepreneurship and technology are touted as inherently beneficial to the point that they become part of policy in Democratic states. He finishes by commenting on Democratic connections with Silicon Valley, the global philanthropy sector, and Hillary Clinton as an avatar of professionalist political ideology.

The afterword to the paperback edition, "The Year They Found Somewhere Else to Go", discusses the 2016 presidential election. Frank describes Hillary Clinton's campaign as an exemplar of "professional-class ideology", for which Trump's victory "was a catastrophic failure."
