= The Worst of Hollywood =

1983 British television series

The Worst of Hollywood was a 1983 television series presented by Michael Medved and screened on Channel 4.

== Overview ==
Following the success of his Golden Turkey Awards books Medved had become a popular guest on British TV chat shows. The series screened late on a Friday night in what became established as Channel 4's slot for 'post pub television'. In each programme, Medved would introduce that week's B movie with a comedic lecture to a studio audience pointing out flaws in the film and relating funny stories about the production. This format contrasted with the established 'high art' approach to presenting cinema of the BBC channels. Following a commercial break, the film would be shown with humorous subtitles and captions pointing up poor special effects and dialogue.

=== Films featured ===
The featured films were:

- Plan 9 from Outer Space
- The Creeping Terror
- The Wild Women of Wongo
- They Saved Hitler's Brain
- Mars Needs Women
- Godzilla vs. The Smog Monster
- The Thing with Two Heads
- Eegah
- Robot Monster
- Santa Claus Conquers the Martians - the Christmas edition

After the film, Medved would return with a short summary concluding each week with ..the worst is yet to come.

Medved's opening lectures usually followed the line that there was only a narrow distinction between critically panned films such as these and the types of films Hollywood continued to produce.

== Production ==
The series was produced by Stephen Woolley, with the opening lectures being filmed at the Scala Cinema he owned and managed. The commercial breaks usually featured adverts for cult films being distributed by Woolley's Palace Video.

== Clive James' documentary ==
The ten-week run was preceded by a one-hour documentary presented by Clive James, who was already established as Channel 4's critic in residence and featuring Medved as an expert. The documentary included clips from more cult and underground films that UK television could not screen at that time.

== Legacy ==
The popularity of the series encouraged the Channel to embrace programming more Cult film and commission similar late night strands presented by Jonathan Ross.

== See also ==
- Mystery Science Theater 3000
- The Canned Film Festival
