= Michael Medved =

American radio show host and writer

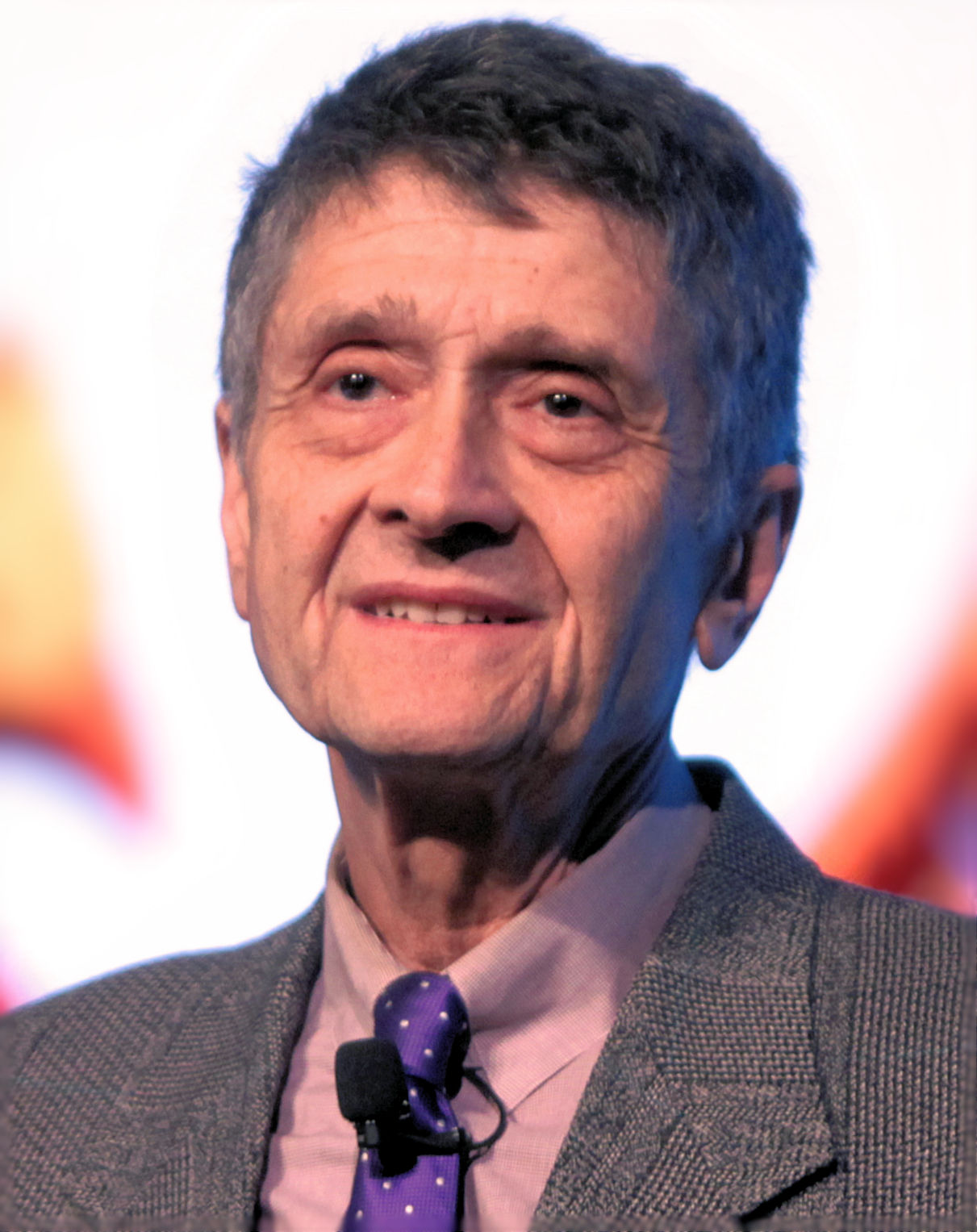
- Medved in 2016
- Born: October 3, 1948 (age 78); Philadelphia, Pennsylvania, U.S.
- Education: Yale University (BA); San Francisco State University (MFA)
- Occupations: Author, political commentator, radio show host, film critic
- Spouse: Diane Elvenstar (m. 1985)
- Children: 3
- Relatives: David Medved (father); Harry Medved
- Website: michaelmedved.com

Michael S. Medved (born October 3, 1948) is an American radio show host, author, political commentator, and film critic. His talk show, The Michael Medved Show, is syndicated from his home station KTTH in Seattle. It is available via Cable Radio Network’s channel CRN1. It was syndicated via Genesis Communications Network until GCN’s closure on May 5, 2024.

== Early life, family and education ==
Michael Medved was born on October 3, 1948, in Philadelphia, Pennsylvania, to Jewish parents Renate (née Hirsch) and David Bernard Medved. His father was a U.S. Navy veteran and scientist. Michael's family's origin is German and Ukrainian. The surname Medved means "bear" in many Slavic languages.

Medved was raised in San Diego, California, where his father worked as a defense contractor for Convair and NASA. After the family moved to Los Angeles, California, he attended Palisades High School.

Medved entered Yale University at age 16. He received his B.A. with honors in 1969, and later attended Yale Law School, but he did not graduate. Medved volunteered for the 1968 presidential campaign of Robert F. Kennedy, and he was present at his assassination.

== Career ==
=== Writer ===
After his first year of law school, Medved left to work as a head speechwriter for diplomat Joseph Duffey in his unsuccessful bid for U.S. Senate, and then for four years as a speechwriter and political consultant. After political campaign work, including a position as an aide to Congressman Ron Dellums, Medved worked in advertising, and coordinated a campaign to recruit more African Americans and Hispanics to the police departments of San Francisco, Oakland and Berkeley.

After writing more than 40 articles for the book The People's Almanac, Medved wrote What Really Happened to the Class of '65?, with David Wallechinsky. Focusing on the post-graduation lives of 30 of Medved's Palisades High School classmates who were featured in a 1965 cover story in Time, the book became a bestseller in 1976. The book also became the basis for a weekly television series on NBC that ran for 13 weeks in 1978. As a result of some screenwriting work for feature film projects and television miniseries, Medved joined the Writers Guild of America.

Medved wrote The Shadow Presidents: The Secret History of the Chief Executives and Their Top Aides (1979), a study of the leading White House assistants since the establishment of the presidential staff in 1857. The book included interviews with the chiefs of staff of presidents Truman, Eisenhower, Kennedy, Johnson, Nixon, and Ford. After the interviews, Medved continued his involvement in politics, befriending Ford's chief of staff, Dick Cheney, affiliating himself with the Republican Party, and campaigning for Ronald Reagan in 1980.

External videos
- After Words interview with Medved on The 10 Big Lies About America, December 6, 2008, C-SPAN
- Presentation by Medved on The 5 Big Lies About American Business, December 9, 2009

In 1984, Medved wrote Hospital: The Hidden Lives of a Medical Center Staff, which was discussed in Time, on ABC's Nightline, and Good Morning America. The book focused on 30 staff people who worked together in a California teaching hospital. In collaboration with his brother, Harry Medved, he wrote four satirical books about movies: The Fifty Worst Films of All Time (1979), The Golden Turkey Awards (1980), The Hollywood Hall of Shame (1984) and Son of Golden Turkey Awards (1986).

In November 2008, Medved released his eleventh nonfiction book, The 10 Big Lies About America: Combating Destructive Distortions About Our Nation. The follow-up volume, The 5 Big Lies About American Business, was released in December 2009.

=== Film reviewer ===
As a film reviewer, Medved hosted a weekly spot on CNN (1980–83) and a show on British Channel 4 network, The Worst of Hollywood. His commentary centered on what he considered bad movies, particularly in "The Golden Turkey Awards". The film selected by the Medved Brothers as The Worst Film of All Time, Plan 9 from Outer Space, has become a cult classic.

In 1984, Medved joined Sneak Previews, the weekly movie review show originated by Gene Siskel and Roger Ebert, co-hosting it for 12 years with Jeffrey Lyons.

In 1993, Medved became chief film critic for the New York Post, a position he held for five years, during which he reviewed more than 700 movies for the paper.

Afterward, Medved played a prominent role in some movie-related controversies. He became an outspoken defender of Mel Gibson's film, The Passion of the Christ (2004), which had been criticized as antisemitic by many prominent Jewish groups. After Gibson's DUI arrest in July 2006, Medved wrote that he felt "betrayed" by Gibson's antisemitic outburst and urged Gibson to seek "reconciliation" with the Jewish community.

Some film critics, including Roger Ebert and Jim Emerson, criticized Medved for mentioning the "right to die/assisted suicide" theme in Clint Eastwood's Oscar-winning Million Dollar Baby, viewing Medved's statements as a plot spoiler. Medved said that the inclusion of this theme in the film was "deeply misleading" because it was marketed as a Rocky-esque tale of a plucky female underdog in the boxing arena. He said he carefully avoided revealing the final turn in the plot, but felt honor-bound to inform his listeners and readers about the movie's content and point of view. Ebert criticized Medved, saying he "has for a long time been a political commentator, not a movie critic."

=== Talk radio and political commentary ===
While focusing on the theme of his next book, Hollywood vs. America, radio talk show host Rush Limbaugh interviewed Medved and then asked him to guest-host his talk show. In 1996 Medved was offered his own local show on a major Seattle radio station. In his 2005 autobiographical book Right Turns: From Liberal Activist to Conservative Champion in 35 Unconventional Lessons, Medved says he welcomed the chance to speak to a wider audience about politics and morality, which were a focus of his writing. The show broadcast from Seattle and syndicated through Salem Radio Network.

His three-hour daily show was broadcast on 200 stations coast to coast and reached more than 4.75 million listeners weekly. For ten consecutive years, Talkers Magazine listed Medved as one of its "Heavy Hundred" most important American talk show hosts, and in 2011 tied for eighth place in its ranking of talk hosts by audience size. Salem Radio announced on November 8, 2018, that Sebastian Gorka would take Medved's time slot in 2019. Medved said that his show would continue in a "new format" at the same time (3–6 p.m. Eastern Time). His show continues in that time slot on fewer stations, but as of 2022, Medved remains in the Talkers Heavy Hundred, at position 92.

Medved describes the show as "Your Daily Dose of Debate", often focused on listeners who call in to debate issues with the host. Guests have included people generally considered left of center, including Noam Chomsky, Michael Moore, John Shelby Spong, Oliver Stone, Warren Beatty, Ralph Nader, Barbara Boxer, Al Gore, Madeleine Albright, Ben Cohen, George Galloway, Thom Hartmann, Naomi Wolf, and Al Franken. Guests generally considered right of center include Robert Spencer, Condoleezza Rice, and Dinesh D'Souza.

Medved describes himself as "your cultural crusader on politics and pop culture" and common themes on his show include current events, politics, American history and the entertainment industry. He reviews four or more new movies or DVD releases per week. The program also includes a weekly "Disagreement Day", focusing on callers from around the country who wish to contest anything Medved has stated in his written articles or on the radio, and a monthly (when the moon is full) "Conspiracy Day", when callers from across the country expose what they consider the "hidden forces" behind "perplexing and painful present events". He gives historical perspective to current events on the show, and has recorded vignettes on major historical events and people in U.S. history, such as the American Revolution and Abraham Lincoln.

External videos
- Booknotes interview with Medved on Hollywood vs. America, December 27, 1992, C-SPAN

Medved writes a regular column for USA Today and is a member of the Board of Contributors for USA Today's Forum Page, part of the newspaper's Opinion section. He writes occasional op-ed pieces for The Wall Street Journal and blogged daily at Townhall. He also wrote the 1992 book Hollywood vs. America, a condemnation of violence in cinema.

Medved reportedly rearranged his schedule in 1993 to "devote time to a run for Congress".

In October 2007, Medved published a controversial column about the history of slavery in the United States, in which he wrote, "No, it's not true that the 'peculiar institution' featured kind-hearted, paternalistic masters and happy, dancing field-hands, any more than it's true that America displayed unparalleled barbarity or enjoyed disproportionate benefit from kidnapping and exploiting innocent Africans."

Medved has argued that American Jewish voters do not necessarily embrace candidates based on their support for the state of Israel as much as they passionately oppose candidates based on their identification with Christianity, especially the Christian Right. He has also said that the Orthodox community, which he says is less than 10% of the U.S. Jewish population, "gives nearly as disproportionate support to Republicans as their Reform, Conservative, and secular Jewish neighbors give to Democrats" and that this is because "The Orthodox feel no instinctive horror at political alliances with others who make faith the center of their lives".

Medved criticized Donald Trump's 2016 presidential campaign, taking a Never Trump stance. He continued to criticize Trump after the election. Medved endorsed Democratic presidential nominee Kamala Harris in the 2024 presidential election.

In 2024, when Trump was elected to a second term, Medved said, "Trump understood far better than anybody on the other side did that the American people were angry, that they were in a bad mood", adding, "They wanted change." He also said that issues like immigration and the economy were also deciding factors in Trump's reelection.

== Personal life ==
Medved has been married to Diane Elvenstar Medved since January 1985. The couple have three children and one grandchild. Diane is a convert to Orthodox Judaism.

In 1991, Medved co-founded Toward Tradition in Washington state with Orthodox rabbi Daniel Lapin and lobbyist Jack Abramoff. In October 1994, it co-sponsored the conference "Toward a New Alliance: American Jews and Political Conservatism", with 300 attendees, featuring panelists Grover Norquist (Americans for Tax Reform), Ralph Reed (Christian Coalition), William Kristol (editor, The Weekly Standard), and David J. Horowitz (Center for the Study of Popular Culture). Also with Lapin, Medved helped revitalize the Pacific Jewish Center, an Orthodox synagogue in Venice, California. For fifteen years, Medved served as president of PJC, which states that its mission is outreach to unaffiliated and disconnected Jews. In his book Right Turns: Unconventional Lessons from a Controversial Life, he states that his commitment to religion led to his conservative political outlook. He is a baal teshuva (returnee to Orthodox Judaism).

In November 2007, Medved became a senior fellow at the Discovery Institute, hub of the intelligent design movement.

On January 30, 2015, Medved announced during his live radio broadcast that he would take an indefinite leave of absence from the show to undergo treatment for throat cancer. He returned to the air on April 21.

== Books ==
- Medved, Michael (2019). God's Hand on America: Divine Providence in the Modern Era. Crown Publishing. ISBN 9780451497413.
- Medved, Michael (2016). The American Miracle: Divine Providence in the rise of the Republic. Crown Forum. ISBN 978-0553447262.
- The 5 Big Lies About American Business: Combating Smears Against the Free-Market Economy. Three Rivers Press. 2009. ISBN 978-0307587473.
- The 10 Big Lies About America: Combating Destructive Distortions About Our Nation, 2008, ISBN 978-0-307-39406-4
- Right Turns: Unconventional Lessons from a Controversial Life, 2005, (explaining his conversion from being a liberal Democrat to conservative Republican) ISBN 1-4000-9832-7 (paperback)
- Saving Childhood: Protecting Our Children from the National Assault on Innocence, coauthored with his wife, clinical psychologist and author Diane Medved, 1998, ISBN 0-06-017372-6; 1999, ISBN 0-06-093224-4
- Hollywood vs. America: Popular Culture and the War on Traditional Values, 1992, ISBN 0-06-016882-X; 1993, ISBN 0-06-092435-7
- Son of Golden Turkey Awards (written with brother Harry Medved), 1986, ISBN 0-394-74341-5
- The Hollywood Hall of Shame: The Most Expensive Flops in Movie History (written with Harry Medved), 1984, ISBN 0-399-51060-5, ISBN 0-399-50714-0 (paperback)
- Hospital: The Hidden Lives of a Medical Center Staff, 1982, ISBN 0-671-42442-4; 1984, ISBN 0-671-42443-2
- The Golden Turkey Awards, (which expanded on the earlier book. Co-written by his brother Harry Medved), 1980, ISBN 0-425-05187-0
- The Shadow Presidents: The Secret History of the Chief Executives and Their Top Aides, (a history of the White House Chiefs of Staff), 1979, ISBN 0-8129-0816-3
- The Fifty Worst Films of All Time, 1978 ISBN 0-446-38119-5
- What Really Happened to the Class of '65?, (written with David Wallechinsky), 1976, ISBN 0-394-40074-7; 1981 paperback, ISBN 0-345-30227-3 (paperback)
