= The Hollywood Hall of Shame =

- First edition (US)
- Author: Harry Medved; Michael Medved
- Language: English
- Genre: Film
- Publisher: Perigee Trade
- Publication date: 1984
- Publication place: United States
- Media type: Print (hardback & paperback)
- ISBN: 978-0399507144
- OCLC: 9969169

The Hollywood Hall of Shame is a 1984 book by brothers Harry and Michael Medved. The authors had previously written or been involved in the creation of similar books exploring "bad movies" or "cinematic mistakes": The Fifty Worst Films of All Time, and The Golden Turkey Awards.

While those earlier books listed films judged by the authors as bad and ridiculous and featured many film oddities, exploitation films and low-budget obscurities, The Hollywood Hall of Shame examines expensive financial disasters; big budget mainstream films that failed miserably at the box office, or had other disastrous consequences.

The main section of The Hollywood Hall of Shame explores in detail a small selection of celebrated failures, describing the financial and production problems that led to the big budget and in many cases cost overruns, while contemplating why the film failed to gain public acceptance. A basement compendium aims to give a comprehensive overview of other big money losers not examined in the main section of the book.

== List of main contents ==
- Silent But Deadly
  - Intolerance (1916)
  - Quo Vadis? (1924)
  - Noah's Ark (1928)
- The Titans and Their Toys
  - Cain and Mabel (1936)
  - Underwater! (1955)
  - The Conqueror (1956)
- Fascist Follies
  - Scipio Africanus (1937)
  - Kolberg (1945)
- Disastrous Debuts
  - Hello, Everybody! (1933)
  - Sincerely Yours (1955)
- Star-crossed Lovers
  - Hotel Imperial (1939)
  - Darling Lili (1970)
- The Elizabeth Taylor Wing
  - Cleopatra (1963)
  - Boom! (1968)
  - The Only Game in Town (1970)
- Child Abuse
  - Doctor Dolittle (1967)
  - The Blue Bird (1976)
- Prophets and Losses
  - The Greatest Story Ever Told (1965)
  - Mohammad: Messenger of God (1977)
- Musical Extravaganzas
  - Paint Your Wagon (1969)
  - Can't Stop the Music (1980)
- Delusions of Grandeur
  - Heaven's Gate (1980)
  - Inchon (1982)

== The Basement Collection ==
While the main section of the book examines in detail those films that the authors felt had interesting production histories and circumstances, The Basement Collection is an objective catalogue covering Hollywood's most expensive failures. The book was published in 1984 and with the hugely inflated film budgets since that time it provides a glimpse of an era when expensive failures were considered notable and unusual.

The Basement Collection includes:

- Annie (1982)
- At Long Last Love (1975)
- The Bible: In the Beginning (1966)
- Big Wednesday (1978)
- Casino Royale (1967)
- Circus World (1964)
- Dragonslayer (1981)
- Exorcist II: The Heretic (1977)
- The Great Gatsby (1974)
- Honky Tonk Freeway (1981)
- Jet Pilot (1951–57)
- The Last Days of Pompeii (1926)
- Mame (1974)
- Man of La Mancha (1972)
- Meteor (1979)
- Mutiny on the Bounty (1962)
- 1941 (1979)
- One from the Heart (1982)
- Ragtime (1981)
- Raise the Titanic (1980)
- Reds (1981)
- Sorcerer (1977)
- Star! (1968)
- The Swarm (1978)
- Tora! Tora! Tora! (1970)
- Waterloo (1970)
- When Time Ran Out (1980)

== See also ==
- The Golden Turkey Awards
- The Fifty Worst Films of All Time
- Michael Medved
