= What's the Matter with Kansas? (film) =

- Directed by: Joe Winston
- Based on: What's the Matter with Kansas by Thomas Frank
- Produced by: Laura Cohen; Joe Winston
- Cinematography: T.W. Li
- Edited by: Joe Winston; Alex MacKenzie
- Distributed by: Passion River Films
- Release date: September 15, 2009
- Running time: 90 minutes
- Country: United States
- Language: English

What's the Matter with Kansas? is a 2009 documentary film by filmmakers Joe Winston and Laura Cohen. It is based on the book What's the Matter with Kansas? How Conservatives Won the Heart of America (2004) by Thomas Frank.

== Synopsis ==
The documentary highlights the lives of people in Middle America, Central United States small town or suburb where most people are middle class, Protestant, and white, which twice helped elect George W. Bush. It shows how Kansas, once home to left-wing movements like the Populist Party, became very socially conservative in the late 20th century.

Abortion is a particularly volatile issue in Kansas, and anti-abortion organizations like Operation Rescue had long staged protests around Dr. George Tiller's abortion clinic, because he was one of the few doctors in the country who performed late-term abortions. The largest of these protests, the Summer of Mercy campaign in 1991, sparked a conservative takeover of the state's Republican Party.

The documentary features a variety of Kansans, most of them conservative, but focuses on three main characters.

Angel Dillard is a mother of two, and a Republican activist. She is introduced at the Kansas State Fair, where she is volunteering for the Kansans For Life booth.

Brittany Barden, 18 years old, is a veteran of several rounds of Republican campaigns. Her mission is to make America "a Christian nation".

Donn Teske describes himself as "a red-neck Kansas farmer". He also says corporate greed is "not very Christian". He fights to save his family farm and others like it.

Angel and Brittany both attend Terry Fox’s 6,000-member Immanuel Baptist Church in Wichita. Fox thunders from his pulpit denouncements of gay marriage, abortion and liberal politicians. He urges his flock to vote to "preserve Kansas' conservative movement" on the eve of the midterm elections.

In 2006, the winds of change blow through Kansas. Terry Fox’s church forces him to resign. He quickly found a new one—in an amusement park called Wild West World. Angel follows Fox to his new church, and invests heavily in the park. Wild West World suddenly goes bankrupt, and the owner skips town with everyone’s money. In November, Republicans, even in Kansas, lose heavily in the 2006 midterm elections.

Meanwhile, Donn Teske finds that the United States Congress is finally listening to him. He reminds them that family farmers care about the environment and global warming.

Despite all their defeats, the Christian Right remains defiant, organized and ready. “We may lose an election or two, but we’ll be back,” says Pastor Fox, speaking to his congregation, gathered at the Wichita Best Western motel.

== Reception ==
Critics differed considerably in their response to the film. Among the most enthusiastic was Roger Ebert, who included the film in his list of the best ten documentaries of 2009 and who wrote, "What's interesting is that every single person in this film is seen as themselves, is allowed to speak and seems to have a good heart. I've rarely seen a documentary quite like it. It has a point to make but no ax to grind." Ted Johnson wrote in Variety that "What makes What's the Matter with Kansas? work, however, is not its colorful cast of characters and situations but its complexity." Andy Webster was more critical, writing in The New York Times that "The specific roots of a pervasive sense of disenfranchisement are barely described, as are strategies for liberals seeking to reclaim the state. What’s the Matter With Kansas? depicts a groundswell of anger but largely ignores the external forces that helped shape it.

== Home media ==
The Special Edition DVD was released in 2011. The volume includes commentary, extended/deleted scenes, and audience question & answer with Thomas Frank, Joe Winston, and Laura Cohen.
