= What's the Matter with Kansas? (book) =

2004 book by Thomas Frank

- Author: Thomas Frank
- Subject: History, United States, Kansas, political science, politics and government, conservatism
- Publisher: Metropolitan Books
- Publication date: June 1, 2004
- Publication place: United States
- Media type: Print (Hardcover)
- Pages: 320
- ISBN: 0-8050-7339-6
- OCLC: 54374636
- Dewey Decimal: 978.1/033 22
- LC Class: F686.2 .F73 2004

What's the Matter with Kansas? How Conservatives Won the Heart of America (2004) is a book by American journalist and historian Thomas Frank, which explores the rise of populist and anti-elitist conservatism in the United States, centering on the experience of Kansas, Frank's native state. In the late 19th century, says Frank, Kansas was known as a hotbed of the left-wing populist movement, but in recent decades, it has become overwhelmingly conservative. The book was published in Britain and Australia as What's the Matter with America?

What's the Matter with Kansas? spent 18 weeks on the New York Times Bestseller List.

== Overview ==
According to the book, the political discourse of recent decades has dramatically shifted from social and economic equality to the use of "explosive" cultural issues, such as abortion and gay marriage, which are used to redirect anger toward "liberal elites."

Against this backdrop, Frank describes the rise of political conservatism in the social and political landscape of Kansas, which he says espouses economic policies that do not benefit the majority of people in the state.

Frank also claims a bitter divide between "moderate" and "conservative" Kansas Republicans (whom he labels "Mods" and "Cons") as an archetype for the future of politics in America, in which fiscal conservatism becomes the universal norm and political war is waged over a handful of hot-button cultural issues.

Not long ago, Kansas would have responded to the current situation by making the bastards pay. This would have been a political certainty, as predictable as what happens when you touch a match to a puddle of gasoline. When business screwed the farmers and the workers – when it implemented monopoly strategies invasive beyond the Populists' furthest imaginings – when it ripped off shareholders and casually tossed thousands out of work – you could be damned sure about what would follow. Not these days. Out here the gravity of discontent pulls in only one direction: to the right, to the right, further to the right. Strip today's Kansans of their job security, and they head out to become registered Republicans. Push them off their land, and next thing you know they're protesting in front of abortion clinics. Squander their life savings on manicures for the CEO, and there's a good chance they'll join the John Birch Society. But ask them about the remedies their ancestors proposed (unions, antitrust, public ownership), and you might as well be referring to the days when knighthood was in flower.

— Thomas Frank, What's the Matter with Kansas? (2004), pp. 67–68

Frank argues that instead of fighting for working class interests, the Democratic party, under the direction of the Democratic Leadership Council (DLC), effectively abandoned them by adopting economically conservative policies. To differentiate themselves from Republicans at the national level, Democrats focused on socio-cultural wedge issues:

The Democratic Leadership Council, the organization that produced such figures as Bill Clinton, Al Gore, Joe Lieberman and Terry McAuliffe, has long been pushing the party to forget blue-collar voters and concentrate instead on recruiting affluent, white-collar professionals who are liberal on social issues. The larger interests that the DLC wants desperately to court are corporations, capable of generating campaign contributions far outweighing anything raised by organized labor. The way to collect the votes and -- more important -- the money of these coveted constituencies, "New Democrats" think, is to stand rock-solid on, say, the pro-choice position while making endless concessions on economic issues, on welfare, NAFTA, Social Security, labor law, privatization, deregulation and the rest of it.

— Thomas Frank, What's the Matter with Kansas? (2004), p. 243

The book also details how Kathleen Sebelius, a Democrat, was elected governor in conservative Kansas. By emphasizing issues such as health care and school funding and avoiding hot-button social issues, Sebelius successfully fractured the Kansas GOP and won a clear majority.

Frank says that the conservative coalition is the dominant coalition in American politics. There are two sides to this coalition, according to the author: Economic conservatives want business tax cuts and deregulation, while social conservatives focus on culture. Frank says that since the coalition formed in the late 1960s, the coalition has been "fantastically rewarding" for the economic conservatives. The policies of the Republicans in power have been exclusively economic, but the coalition has caused the social conservatives to be worse off economically, due to these pro-corporate policies. Meanwhile, Frank says, the social issues that the "Cons" faction pushes never go anywhere after the election. According to the book, "abortion is never outlawed, school prayer never returns, the culture industry is never forced to clean up its act." He attributes this partly to conservatives "waging cultural battles where victory is impossible," such as a constitutional amendment banning gay marriage. He also argues that the very capitalist system the economic conservatives strive to strengthen and deregulate promotes and commercially markets the perceived assault on traditional values.

Frank also discusses Kansas' history on slavery and civil rights, experiencing violent conflict before entering as a free state, as well as being the location of Brown v. Board of Education (1954) that outlawed racial segregation. He argues that conservative backlash in Kansas cannot be ascribed to racism.

The state may be 88 percent white, but it cannot be easily dismissed as a nest of bigots. Kansas does not have Trent Lott's disease. It is not Alabama in the sixties. It was not tempted to go for George Wallace in 1968. Few here get sentimental about the Confederate flag. Kansas may burn to restore the gold standard; it may shriek for concealed carry and gasp at imagined liberal conspiracies; but one thing it doesn't do is racism.

— Thomas Frank, What's the Matter with Kansas? (2004)

Frank applies his thesis to answer the question of why these social conservatives continue to vote for Republicans, even though they are voting against their best interests. He argues that politicians and pundits stir the "Cons" to action by evoking certain issues, such as abortion, immigration, and taxation. By portraying themselves as champions of the conservatives on these issues, the politicians can get "Cons" to vote them into office. However, once in office, these politicians turn their attention to more mundane economic issues, such as business tax reduction or deregulation. Frank's thesis goes thus:

In order to explain to the "Cons" why no progress gets made on these issues, politicians and pundits point their fingers to a "liberal elite," a straw man representing everything that conservatism is not. When reasons are given, they eschew economic reasons in favor of accusing this elite of simply hating America, or having a desire to harm "average" Americans. This theme of victimization by these "elites" is pervasive in conservative literature, despite the fact that at the time conservatives controlled all three branches of government, were being served by an extensive media devoted only to conservative ideology, and had won 6 of the previous 9 presidential elections.

— Thomas Frank, What's the Matter with Kansas? (2004)

== Title ==
The book derives its name from an August 15, 1896 editorial by William Allen White in the Emporia Gazette, in which he took Populist leaders to task for letting Kansas slip into economic stagnation and not keeping up economically with neighboring states because of Populist policies chasing away economic capital from the state. The Republicans sent out hundreds of thousands of copies of the editorial in support of William McKinley during the 1896 U.S. presidential election.

The editorial established White's career in journalism. Five Republican presidents — Theodore Roosevelt, William Howard Taft, Warren Harding, Calvin Coolidge, and Herbert Hoover — were to spend nights at his home.

== Scholarly studies ==
The notion that American politics has been transformed because of defection from the Democratic ranks of working-class social conservatives has been studied by others. Bartels identifies numerous scholars making the claim. They argue that the class basis of New Deal coalition had given way to a new structure in which conservative ideology and cultural issues brought large numbers of working-class whites into the Republican camp.

- As far back as Richard Nixon's first year in the White House, Kevin Phillips made the claim in The Emerging Republican Majority (1969).
- Political scientist Everett Carll Ladd Jr. in 1976 identified "an inversion of the old class relationship in voting" due to "the transformations of conflict characteristic of post-industrialism."
- Robert Huckfeldt and Carol Weitzel Kohfeld in Race and the Decline of Class in American Politics (1989) argued that "race served to splinter the Democratic coalition" because the policy commitments of the Civil Rights era provoked "[r]acial hostility, particularly on the part of lower-status whites."

== Criticism ==
In the study "The Truth about Conservative Christians," two sociologists, Andrew Greeley and Michael Hout, claim to show that class does matter, despite Frank's thesis. Poorer Protestants, they argue, are much less likely to vote Republican than affluent ones. And, they claim, conservative Protestants are actually more likely to support progressive taxation than "mainline" Protestants are.

Conservative columnist John Leo argues that despite Frank's belief that conservative politics is just a game of "bait-and-switch", rural conservative voters have made their voices heard on a vast array of social issues. He says, "few of the issues that traditionalists care about ever seem to come up for democratic vote. Major change is imposed by courts or manipulated behind the scenes by bureaucrats loyal to the new moralists and the Democratic Party."

Larry Bartels, an American political scientist and the Co-Director of the Center for the Study of Democratic Institutions and Shayne Chair in Public Policy and Social Science at Vanderbilt University, in "What's the matter with What's the Matter with Kansas?," tests "Frank's thesis by examining class-related patterns of issue preferences, partisanship, and voting over the past half-century." Specifically, Bartels focuses on four questions:

- Has the white working class abandoned the Democratic party?
- Has the white working class become more conservative?
- Do working class "moral values" trump economics?
- Are religious voters distracted from economic issues?

Bartels answers each question in the negative.

Frank provided a lengthy rebuttal to Bartels' analysis.

In an apparent attempt to rebut Frank's rebuttal via Barack Obama's now infamous "bitter" label regarding Middle America during the 2008 Democratic Presidential campaign, Bartels offered a somewhat revised analysis of Frank's original thesis in an op-ed piece in the April 17, 2008 edition of The New York Times.

== See also ==
- What's the Matter with Kansas? (film)
- Right-wing populism
- Listen, Liberal
- Just How Stupid Are We?
