= Thomas Frank (political commentator) =

American political analyst, historian, and writer

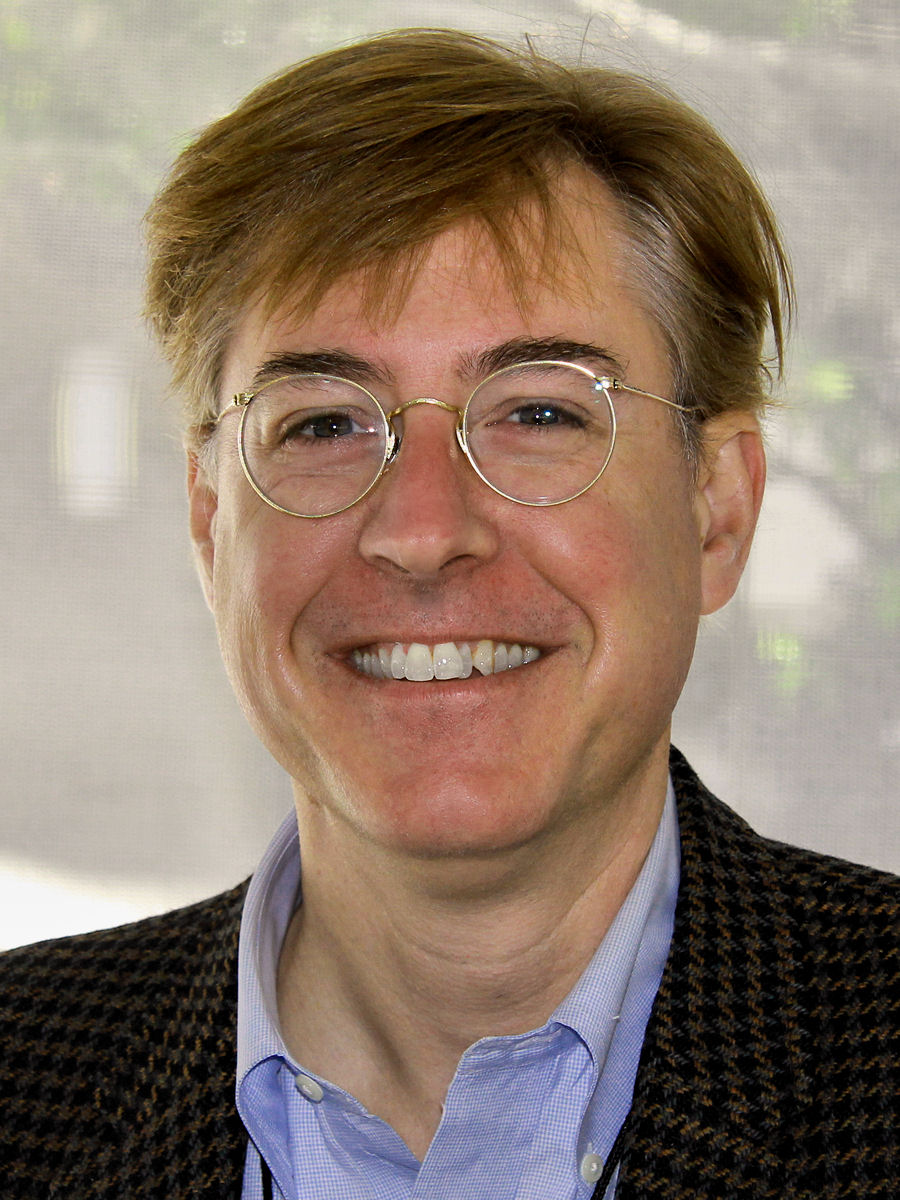
- Frank at the 2012 Texas Book Festival
- Born: Thomas Carr Frank; March 21, 1965 (age 61); Kansas City, Missouri, U.S.
- Education: University of Kansas (attended); University of Virginia (BA); University of Chicago (MA, PhD)
- Notable work: What's the Matter with Kansas? (2004)
- Political party: Democratic

Thomas Carr Frank (born March 21, 1965) is an American political analyst, and historian. He co-founded and edited The Baffler magazine. Frank is the author of the books What's the Matter with Kansas? (2004) and Listen, Liberal (2016), among others. From 2008 to 2010 he wrote "The Tilting Yard", a column in The Wall Street Journal.

A historian of culture and ideas, Frank analyzes trends in American electoral politics and propaganda, advertising, popular culture, mainstream journalism, and economics. His topics include the rhetoric and impact of culture wars in American political life and the relationship between politics, economics, and culture in the United States.

== Early life ==
Frank was born in Kansas City, Missouri, and grew up in Mission Hills, Kansas. He graduated from Shawnee Mission East High School, and in 1988 from the University of Virginia with a Bachelor of Arts degree in history after transferring from the University of Kansas in his freshman year. Frank received a Master of Arts degree in history in 1990 and a doctorate in history in 1994 from the University of Chicago. His doctoral thesis on advertising in the 1960s, The Conquest of Cool: Business Culture, Counterculture, and the Rise of Hip Consumerism, was later published by the University of Chicago Press.

== Politics ==
Frank was a College Republican, attending campus meetings at the University of Kansas, but became highly critical of conservatism. He summarized the thesis of his 2008 book The Wrecking Crew as "Bad government is the natural product of rule by those who believe government is bad."

Frank's other writings include essays for Harper's Magazine, Le Monde diplomatique, Bookforum, and the Financial Times. His book What's the Matter with Kansas? (2004) earned him nationwide and international recognition. In October 2005, Frank received the Eugene V. Debs Award for his work in social justice.

From December 2010 to February 2014, Frank wrote the monthly "Easy Chair" column for Harper's Magazine.

Frank identifies as a left-wing populist and supported Bernie Sanders's 2016 and 2020 presidential campaigns.

In Listen, Liberal: Or, What Ever Happened to the Party of the People? (2016), Frank was one of the few analysts who foresaw that Donald Trump could win the 2016 United States presidential election. In 2018, he called Trump "the worst politician ever" but maintained that Trump could be reelected in 2020. Frank further observes that "quasi-fascist movements" are springing up around the world.

Frank's research into US populism was published as the book The People, No: A Brief History of Anti-Populism (2020). In it, he examines the origin of the term in the United States and discusses historical examples of populism and its adherents and detractors.

== Personal life ==
Frank lives in Bethesda, Maryland, with his wife, Wendy Edelberg, and their children.

== Works ==
=== Books ===
External videos
- Presentation by Frank on One Market Under Ground, March 9, 2001, C-SPAN
- Presentation by Frank on What's the Matter With Kansas?', June 14, 2004, C-SPAN
- Washington Journal interview with Frank on What's the Matter With Kansas?, November 9, 2004, C-SPAN
- Presentation by Frank on What's the Matter With Kansas?, December 6, 2004, C-SPAN
- After Words interview with Frank on The Wrecking Crew, August 23, 2008, C-SPAN
- Presentation by Frank on Pity the Billionaire, January 6, 2012, C-SPAN
- Presentation by Frank on Pity the Billionaire, October 27, 2012, C-SPAN
- Presentation by Frank on Listen Liberal, March 15, 2016, C-SPAN
- Presentation by Frank on Listen Liberal, June 11, 2016, C-SPAN
- Presentation by Frank on Rendezvous with Oblivion, June 27, 2018, C-SPAN

- Frank, Thomas (1997). The Conquest of Cool: Business Culture, Counterculture, and the Rise of Hip Consumerism. University of Chicago Press. ISBN 9780226259918.
- One Market Under God: Extreme Capitalism, Market Populism, and the End of Economic Democracy (2000) ISBN 0-385-49503-X
- New Consensus for Old: Cultural Studies from Left to Right (2002) ISBN 0-9717575-4-2
- Boob Jubilee: The Cultural Politics of the New Economy (2003) ISBN 0-393-32430-3
- What's the Matter with Kansas? How Conservatives Won the Heart of America (2004). Henry Holt and Co. ISBN 978-1-4299-0032-4
- What's the Matter with America? The Resistible Rise of the American Right (2006) ISBN 0-09-949293-8
- The Wrecking Crew: How Conservatives Rule (2008), Henry Holt and Co. ISBN 0-8050-7988-2
- Pity the Billionaire: The Hard-Times Swindle and the Unlikely Comeback of the Right (2011) ISBN 978-0-8050-9369-8
- Listen, Liberal: Or, What Ever Happened to the Party of the People? (2016) ISBN 978-1-6277-9539-5
- Rendezvous with Oblivion: Reports from a Sinking Society (2018) ISBN 978-1250293664
- The People, No: A Brief History of Anti-Populism (2020) ISBN 978-1250220110 (International title: People Without Power: The War on Populism and the Fight for Democracy ISBN 978-1912854226)
- The Creativity Con: How Innovation Became America's Biggest Racket (2026) ISBN 978-0593657539

=== Articles ===
- Frank, Thomas (November 2012). "All the rage". Easy Chair. Harper's. 325 (1950): 6, 8–9.
- Frank, Thomas (July 2026). "The Spirit of the Age". Easy Chair. Harper's. 353 (2114): 5–7.

== See also ==
- What's the Matter with Kansas? (film)
- American Feud: A History of Conservatives and Liberals (film). Includes interviews with Frank speaking about "red states", "blue states" and other aspects of American politics.
- The Trap (TV Documentary Series). Frank appears in part two of the BBC documentary series.
