= List of 20th-century films considered the worst =

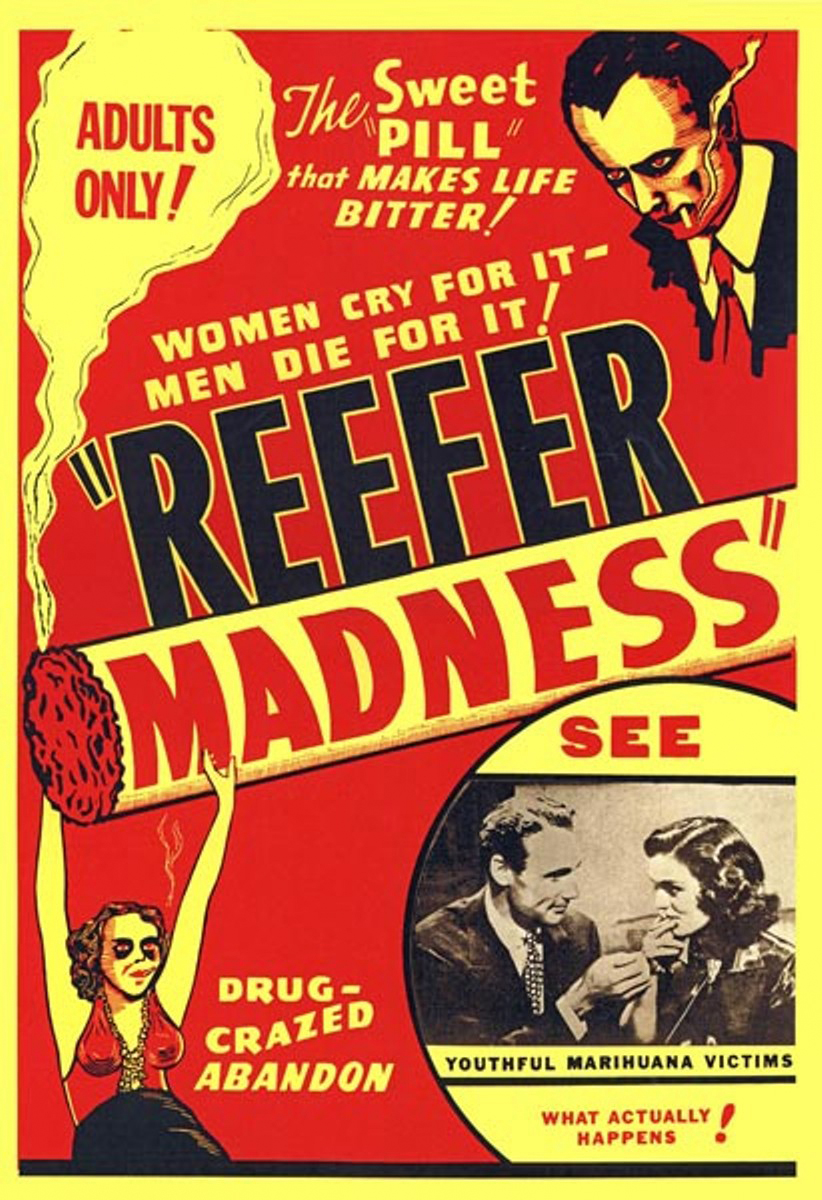
Reefer Madness (1936), one of the earliest films to garner particularly negative reviews

The films listed below have been ranked by a number of critics in varying media sources as being among the worst films ever made in the 20th century. Examples of such sources include Metacritic, Roger Ebert's list of most-hated films, The Golden Turkey Awards, Leonard Maltin's Movie Guide, Rotten Tomatoes, pop culture writer Nathan Rabin's My World of Flops, the Stinkers Bad Movie Awards, the cult TV series Mystery Science Theater 3000 (alongside spinoffs Cinematic Titanic, The Film Crew and RiffTrax), and the Golden Raspberry Awards (aka the "Razzies"). Films on these lists are generally feature-length films that are commercial/artistic in nature (intended to turn a profit, express personal statements or both), professionally or independently produced (as opposed to amateur productions, such as home movies), and released in theaters, then on home video. There are 57 films listed below, with 103 across both lists.

== 1930s ==
=== Maniac (1934) ===
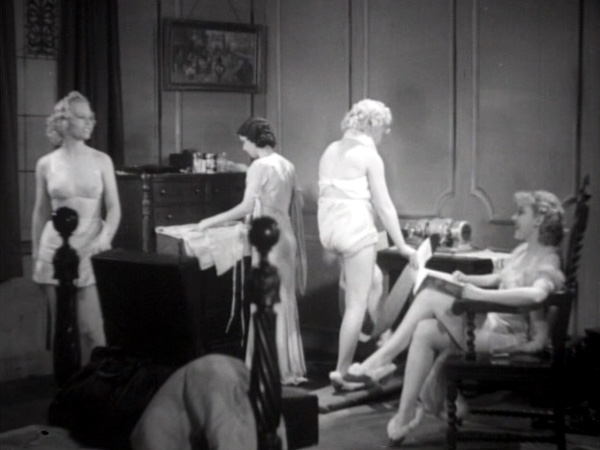
Maniac (1934) is one of the many pre-Code exploitation films from the 1930s featuring sex, violence and drugs.

Maniac, also known as Sex Maniac, is a pre-Code exploitation-horror film directed by Dwain Esper. The story is a loose adaptation of the Edgar Allan Poe story "The Black Cat" and follows a vaudeville impersonator who becomes an assistant to a mad scientist. Promoted as a documentary on mental illness, Maniac was criticized for its gratuitous footage of women undressing and for plagiarizing horror sequences from the 1922 silent film Häxan. Danny Peary believes that Maniac is the worst film ever made, and Charlie Jane Anders of Gawker Media's io9 described it as "possibly the worst movie in history." Rotten Tomatoes placed Maniac on its list of movies "So Bad They're Unmissable", Vanity Fair included the film on its list of the 20 worst movies ever and it is featured in John J. B. Wilson's book The Official Razzie Movie Guide: Enjoying the Best of Hollywood's Worst.

=== Reefer Madness (1936) ===
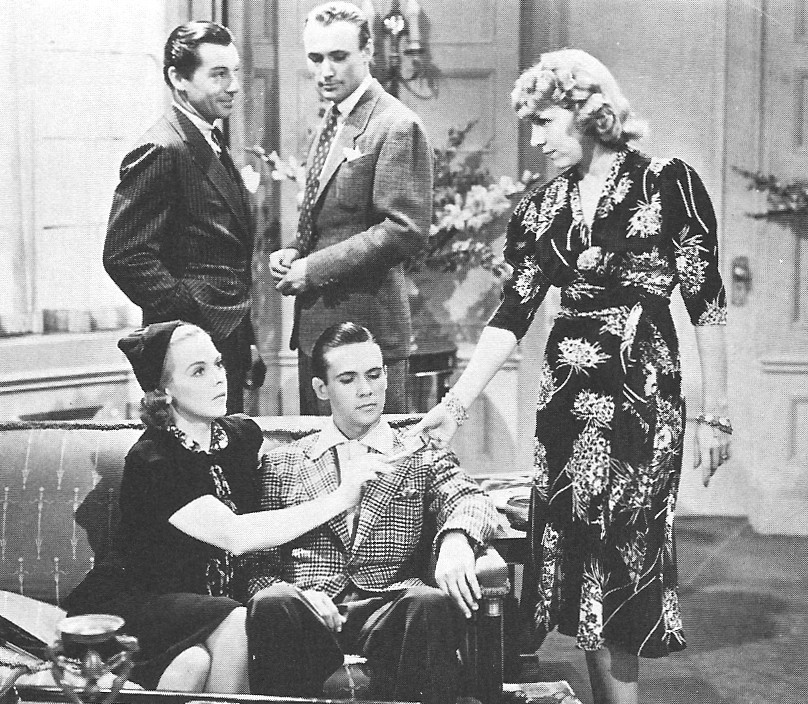
Originally titled Tell Your Children, the anti-cannabis film Reefer Madness was called "the grand-daddy of all 'Worst' movies" by Leonard Maltin.

Reefer Madness (originally released as Tell Your Children and sometimes titled or subtitled as The Burning Question, Dope Addict, Doped Youth, and Love Madness) is a 1936 American exploitation film and propaganda work revolving around the melodramatic events that ensue when high school students are lured by pushers to smoke cannabis and consequently become addicted and involved in various crimes such as a hit and run accident, manslaughter, murder, attempted rape, descent into madness, association with organized crime, and suicide.

Pacific Standard wrote that Reefer Madness was "one of the first films ever to be considered transcendentally bad" and Leonard Maltin has called it "the grand-daddy of all 'Worst' movies". News.com.au considered it a "disastrous flop turned cult classic" due to its "terrible acting and exaggerated drug-addicted stereotypes". Natalli Amato of The Daily Dot included Reefer Madness on her list of the best worst movies, writing that it "may be one of the worst movies of all time for the fact that it accomplished the exact opposite of its intended goal" by becoming a cult classic among stoners. Leafly's Danté Jordan also wrote that it may be "the worst movie of all time", criticizing its many inaccuracies regarding marijuana use and calling it "easily one of the most uncreative and tone-deaf pieces of anti-cannabis propaganda".

=== The Terror of Tiny Town (1938) ===
The Terror of Tiny Town, directed by Sam Newfield and produced by Jed Buell, remains the only musical Western with an all-dwarf cast. The film was pulled from obscurity as a camp classic after appearing in college and midnight screenings in the early 1970s. In 1978, it was included in Michael Medved's book The Fifty Worst Films of All Time, and it has since been listed as one of the worst films ever made by Flavorwire, Rotten Tomatoes, and The Golden Turkey Awards. Melvin Defleur referred to it as "Perhaps the worst film of all time", and critic Gabriel Ricard listed it as the worst film ever made; stating, "not only is it pretty terrible, but Tiny Town is also pretty endearing." In 1986, The Terror of Tiny Town was the first film featured on Canned Film Festival, a late night television show featuring the worst movies ever made.

== 1940s ==
=== The Babe Ruth Story (1948) ===
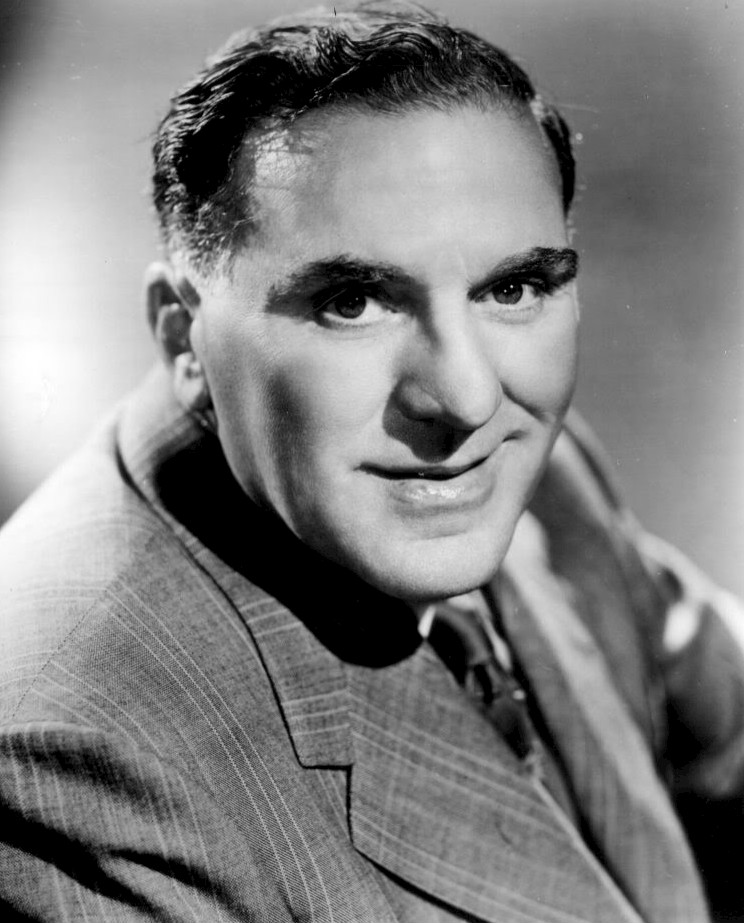
Actor William Bendix, who played The Great Bambino in The Babe Ruth Story (1948), cited as one of the worst biopics ever made

The Babe Ruth Story is a 1948 baseball film biography of Babe Ruth, starring William Bendix, Claire Trevor and Sam Levene. The New York Times describes it as "the Plan 9 from Outer Space of baseball biopics". It was rushed into release while Ruth was still alive. One infamous scene features Ruth promising a dying child that he will hit two home runs; the child is subsequently cured of his ailments after Ruth delivers on the promise.

Baseball Hall of Famer Ted Williams believed it to be the worst movie he had ever seen. The Washington Times stated that it "stands as possibly the worst movie ever made". The Spokesman-Review included the film on its list of the worst films of all time, while Paul Newberry of the Associated Press wrote that the film's place on "nearly every list of the worst movies ever made" was "with good reason". Newsday's Jack Mathews similarly wrote that The Babe Ruth Story was "what many people consider to be the worst sports movie of all time". It also was called one of the worst sports films ever, by both Newsday and The A.V. Club, and called one of the worst biopics by Moviefone and Spike. Entertainment writer Michael Sauter included the film in his book, The Worst Movies of All Time, and Leonard Maltin called it "perfectly dreadful".

=== No Orchids for Miss Blandish (1948) ===
No Orchids for Miss Blandish, a British gangster film adapted from the 1939 novel by James Hadley Chase, received a very hostile reception from the press. This was mainly due to the film's high (for the time) implied level of violence and rape, but also because its attempt to portray Americans using a largely British cast (including an early role for Sid James) was seen as unconvincing.

The British film journal Monthly Film Bulletin called it "the most sickening exhibition of brutality, perversion, sex and sadism ever to be shown on a cinema screen". The Sunday Express film reviewer called No Orchids for Miss Blandish "the worst film I have ever seen". The Australian newspaper The Age also gave a harsh review: "No Orchids for Miss Blandish is not only a disgrace to the studio that made it, but it also reflects on the British industry as a whole ... the entire production is unpardonable."

Cliff Goodwin, discussing No Orchids for Miss Blandish's initial reception, notes it was "unanimously dubbed 'the worst film ever made'". Later reviews of the film were equally antipathetic. No Orchids for Miss Blandish was described by British film reviewer Leslie Halliwell as a "hilariously awful gangster film ... one of the worst films ever made". Leonard Maltin's Classic Movie Guide states that No Orchids for Miss Blandish "aspires to be a Hollywood film noir and misses by a mile."

Despite (or because) of the condemnation, the film was commercially successful and broke box office records in Britain in areas where it was not banned.

== 1950s ==
=== Glen or Glenda (1953) ===
Glen or Glenda starred Ed Wood as Glen, a transvestite who cross-dresses as Glenda. Wood also directed the film. After a dream sequence, Glen undergoes psychotherapy to help "cure" him of his transvestism.

Leonard Maltin wrote that Glen or Glenda was worse than Wood's later Plan 9 from Outer Space and considered it "possibly the worst movie ever made". Julien Allen of Reverse Shot similarly wrote that it was "widely considered to be an atrocity" and "the most catastrophic failure of [Wood's] singularly bad career". Richard Barrios described Glen or Glenda as "one of the funniest and worst movies ever made".

=== Robot Monster (1953) ===
Robot Monster is a science-fiction film produced and directed by Phil Tucker and originally shot and exhibited in 3D. Its title character, which is "a man in a gorilla suit wearing what looks like a diving helmet sprouting TV antennae", was given the Most Ridiculous Monster in Screen History award in The Golden Turkey Awards. It is also featured in The Book of Lists' 10 worst movies list, The Fifty Worst Films of All Time and Michael Sauter's book The Worst Movies of All Time. Robot Monster was featured in an episode of the movie-mocking TV show Mystery Science Theater 3000, as well as Canned Film Festival. The film is remembered fondly by horror novelist Stephen King, who quotes, and agrees with, a review in Castle of Frankenstein magazine ("certainly among the finest terrible movies ever made", "one of the most laughable poverty row quickies"). Chris Barsanti in The Sci-Fi Movie Guide writes: "[Robot Monster] gives Plan 9 From Outer Space a run as the worst movie of all time."

=== The Conqueror (1956) ===
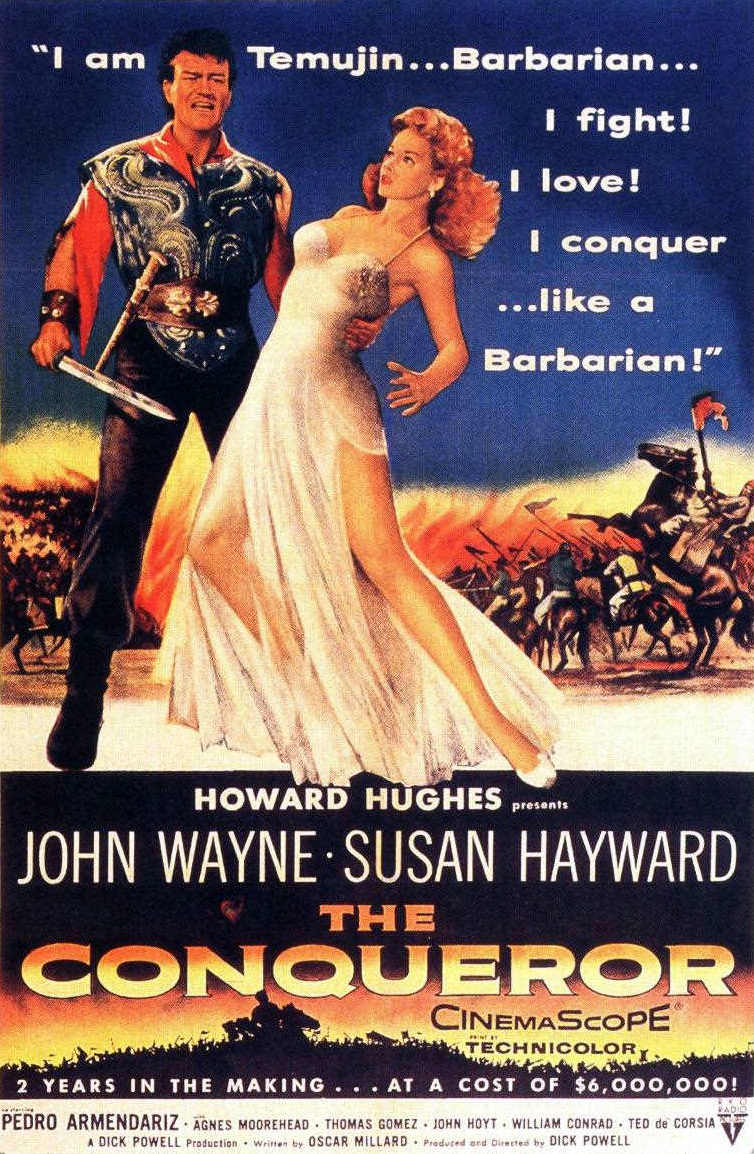
The 1956 film epic The Conqueror featured John Wayne as Asian warlord Genghis Khan, cited as one of the most miscast roles ever

Howard Hughes funded The Conqueror, an epic film featuring John Wayne as Mongolian chieftain Genghis Khan and the redheaded Susan Hayward as a Tatar princess. The movie was filmed near St. George, Utah, downwind from a nuclear testing range in Nevada, and is often blamed for the cancer deaths of many of the cast and crew, including Hayward, Wayne, Agnes Moorehead, Pedro Armendáriz, and director Dick Powell. In addition to filming near the testing range, truckloads of the red sands were transported back to the studios for interior scenes and by 1980, 91 of the 220 (over 41%) cast and crew members had been diagnosed with cancer.

The film made the ten-worst list in The Book of Lists, appears in Michael Sauter's The Worst Movies of All Time, and was among those listed in The Fifty Worst Films of All Time. Additionally, the Aldergrove Star described The Conqueror as the worst ever made and Complex listed it as the worst biopic ever made. The Guardian called the choice of Wayne for Khan – a role originally written for Marlon Brando – "one of the worst casting decisions of all time". Despite Wayne having lobbied for the lead role after reading the script, he later lamented having taken it, stating, "Don't make an ass of yourself trying to play parts you are not suited for." The Daily Telegraph writes: "by absolutely every conceivable metric – financially, critically, historically, ethnically, and even body count – it would come to be known as one of the biggest disasters in cinematic history." Rolling Stone described the film as the worst decision in movie history.

Hughes, one of the world's wealthiest people at the time, had previously produced the successful dramatic films Hell's Angels, Scarface, and The Outlaw. After viewing The Conqueror, Hughes bought every existing print for $12 million and refused to let the film be seen on TV until 1974, reportedly out of guilt over the decision to shoot at such a hazardous location. This was the last film Hughes produced.

=== Fire Maidens from Outer Space (1956) ===
Fire Maidens from Outer Space, a low-budget British space opera film (known in the US as Fire Maidens of Outer Space), is about a group of astronauts visiting an all-female society on a moon of Jupiter. This film developed a negative reputation for its poor special effects (including a scene on the alien planet in which an automobile is visible driving past). Leslie Halliwell described Fire Maidens from Outer Space as "a strong contender for the title of the worst movie ever made, with diaphanously clad English gals striking embarrassed poses against cardboard sets". British film historian I.Q. Hunter included it in his list of candidates for "the worst British film ever made". The DVD Talk website's review claimed it "may be among the worst-ever professionally produced science fiction films". Paul Welsh of the Borehamwood & Elstree Times wrote that it was "probably the worst [film] ever produced". In his book Operation Hollywood: How the Pentagon Shapes and Censors the Movies, David L. Robb wrote that the film's director Cy Roth is "widely regarded as one of the worst filmmakers of all time", adding that, out of the three films he made, "the worst was Fire Maidens from Outer Space...which is often cited as one of the ten worst movies ever made".

=== Plan 9 from Outer Space (1957) ===
Ed Wood's Plan 9 from Outer Space, a science fiction film about aliens resurrecting the dead, was labeled the "Worst Film Ever" by The Golden Turkey Awards in 1980. Wood had shot only a small amount of unrelated footage featuring top-billed star Bela Lugosi before Lugosi's death. Wood incorporated the footage into the film and cast Tom Mason as Lugosi's body double; Mason, a personal acquaintance of Wood, bore little resemblance to Lugosi and played his scenes holding the character's cape in front of his face. Although Golden Turkey Awards author Michael Medved credits Lugosi's top billing with its enduring legacy, The Independent listed various other shortcomings: "A UFO dangling in the sky has been variously said to be either a car hubcap or a paper plate. Actors read from scripts on their lap; sound microphones wobble in and out of shot. Fake trees and cemetery headstones wobble as the actors brush past them. Characters go into scenes when it's night time and leave five minutes later into daylight. ... the plot itself appears to be the product of insanity."

Emanuel Levy notes the film has been dubbed "the epitome of so-bad-it's-good cinema" and has gained a cult following since appearing in The Golden Turkey Awards. My Year of Flops author Nathan Rabin wrote that: "It's hard to overstate the role Plan 9 From Outer Space and its eccentric creator have played in the birth and evolution of bad movie culture... Plan 9 was the original best worst movie." BBC writer Nicholas Barber wrote that "it stands as the epitome of cinematic awfulness. And that's why so many people love it." Glenn Kenny of RogerEbert.com and The Radio Times Guide to Films each described it as the worst movie ever made, and IGN wrote: "Plan 9 from Outer Space was the undisputed best worst movie ever made for decades until films like Troll 2 and The Room got notorious, and it's still a legitimate contender".

It holds a 66% rating on Rotten Tomatoes based on 38 reviews, with the consensus stating that it is "justly celebrated for its staggering ineptitude". Phil Hall of Film Threat contends that the film is "far too entertaining to be considered as the very worst film ever made", and Kim Newman states that, "The worst thing you can say about a film is that it's boring, and Plan 9 is a fairly entertaining movie." Although Flavorwire included it on its list of the 50 worst movies ever made (in the 50th spot), writer Jason Bailey described The Golden Turkey Awards' assessment of it as "a label that stuck" and opined that he did not think it was even Wood's worst film. Likewise, John Wirt of The Advocate goes as far as to call it "the ultimate cult flick", and Videohound's Complete Guide to Cult Flicks and Trash Pics states, "In fact, the film has become so famous for its own badness that it's now beyond criticism." Barber credits Plan 9's cult following to the film having some "halfway decent" elements, such as the film's title and screen presence of actors Tor Johnson and Maila Nurmi, while film historian Rodney F. Hill considers the film to be a "campy, cult masterpiece" with a "minimalist avant-garde aesthetic".

== 1960s ==
=== The Creeping Terror (1964) ===
The science-fiction/horror film The Creeping Terror was directed, produced, and edited by Vic Savage (under the pseudonym A.J. Nelson or Arthur Nelson, but kept his name when credited as an actor). The movie is about a large slug-like alien that lands on Earth and terrorizes a small town in California. The film is memorable for its use of some bargain-basement effects: stock footage of a rocket launch played in reverse to depict the landing of an alien spacecraft, and the "monster" appears to be composed of a length of shag carpet draped over several actors. Notably, the creature's victims inexplicably stand perfectly still as the slow-moving monster approaches them.

ComingSoon.net declared it "widely considered the worst picture ever made", calling Plan 9 From Outer Space "a bona fide magnum opus" compared to The Creeping Terror. Montreal Gazette and Dread Central also report that it has a reputation as being one of the worst films ever made. The film was featured in The Golden Turkey Awards, and its follow-up book, Son of Golden Turkey Awards. Mystery Science Theater 3000 featured The Creeping Terror in its sixth season and British film magazine Total Film included it on its list of the 66 worst films ever made.

A documentary directed by Pete Schuermann about the making of the film, The Creep Behind The Camera, was released in 2014.

=== Santa Claus Conquers the Martians (1964) ===
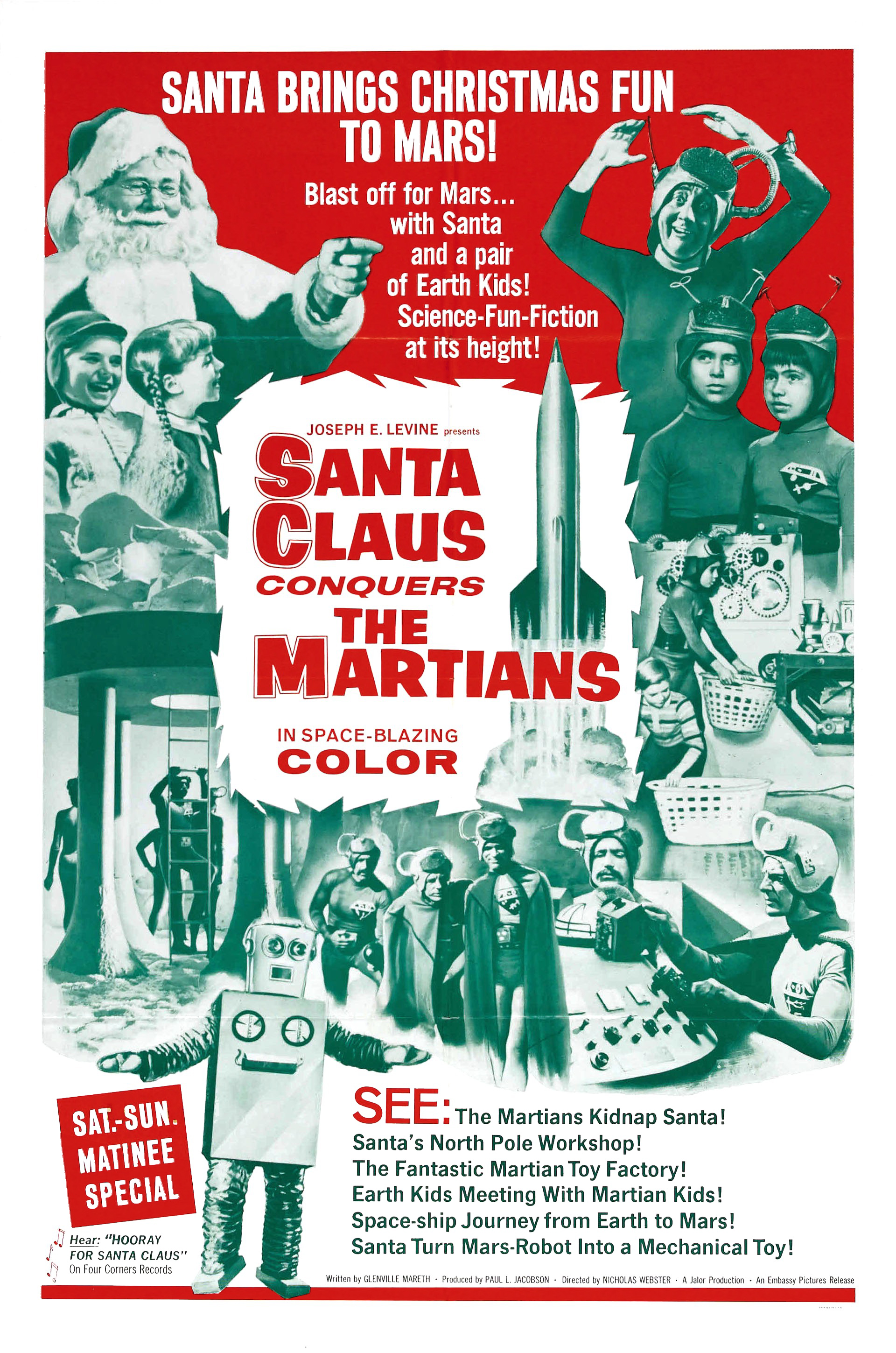
Santa Claus Conquers the Martians is the only film to be featured on all three of the following shows: Mystery Science Theater 3000, Rifftrax and Cinematic Titanic.

The sci-fi movie Santa Claus Conquers the Martians was the creation of TV director Nicholas Webster. Because Martian children only get to see Santa Claus on TV signals beamed from Earth, their parents decide to abduct Santa to make them happy. The film was criticized for its oddity and poor special effects. It is also known for starring a very young Pia Zadora. BBC critic Nick Cramp described it as "possibly the worst film ever made". The film is cited on a 10-worst list in The Book of Lists and in The Fifty Worst Films of All Time. It has been featured in Mystery Science Theater 3000, Canned Film Festival, Rifftrax and Cinematic Titanic (another spin-off of MST3K that revisited the film in 2008).

=== The Incredibly Strange Creatures Who Stopped Living and Became Mixed-Up Zombies (1964) ===
The Incredibly Strange Creatures Who Stopped Living and Became Mixed-Up Zombies (sometimes shortened to The Incredibly Strange Creatures) is a 1964 American monster movie written and directed by Ray Dennis Steckler. Steckler also starred in the film, billed under the pseudonym "Cash Flagg". In the film, three friends visit a carnival and stumble onto a group of occultists and disfigured monsters. Produced on a $38,000 budget, much of it takes place at The Pike amusement park in Long Beach, California, which resembles Brooklyn's Coney Island. The film was billed as the first "monster musical", beating out The Horror of Party Beach by a mere month in release date. The music critic Lester Bangs wrote an appreciative 1973 essay about Incredibly Strange Creatures in which he tries to explain and justify the movie's value: "This flick doesn't just rebel against, or even disregard, standards of taste and art. In the universe inhabited by The Incredibly Strange Creatures Who Stopped Living and Became Mixed-Up Zombies, such things as standards and responsibility have never been heard of. It is this lunar purity which largely imparts to the film its classic stature. Like Beyond the Valley of the Dolls and a very few others, it will remain as an artifact in years to come to which scholars and searchers for truth can turn and say, 'This was trash!'" The 2004 DVD The 50 Worst Movies Ever Made listed this film as the worst film of all time. Time Out and Flavorwire included it on their respective worst film lists.

=== Monster a Go-Go! (1965) ===
Monster a Go-Go! began as Terror at Halfday by Bill Rebane. The production ran out of money and the film was abandoned. Herschell Gordon Lewis, who reportedly needed a second feature to compose a double bill, purchased and completed it for a minimal amount of money. Several of the film's actors were unable to return, so Lewis simply replaced their parts with new characters who mysteriously appear and fill the roles of the missing characters. One of the actors Lewis managed to rehire had gained weight, gone bald, and grown a goatee, so Lewis recast him as the brother of the original character. The picture consists mostly of lengthy dialogue sequences concerning the apparent mutation of an astronaut into a monster portrayed by the 231 cm-tall (7 ft 6 3/4 in) Henry Hite. Poor audio quality makes much of the dialogue unintelligible, and when the film is overexposed, several characters' faces appear as bright white, glowing circles. During the climax of the movie, as soldiers prepare to confront the mutated astronaut, he abruptly vanishes and the narrator informs the audience, "there was no monster", and that the astronaut has, in fact, been in the Atlantic Ocean the entire time.

NJ.com notes that many cinemaphiles consider it to be the worst film of all time, including the film's original director Rebane. Matt Brunson of Film Frenzy agrees with its designation as one of the worst films ever made, stating it belongs in the "exalted pantheon of immortal atrocities like Plan 9 from Outer Space, Robot Monster and Manos: The Hands of Fate". Meanwhile, MovieWeb writer B. Alan Orange believes it to be the second-worst movie ever made, after Superbabies: Baby Geniuses 2. It was also featured on Mystery Science Theater 3000, where writer Paul Chaplin called the dialogue "garbled beyond recognition" and declared it to be the worst movie they ever featured on the program. Total Film later included it on its list of the worst films ever made.

=== Manos: The Hands of Fate (1966) ===
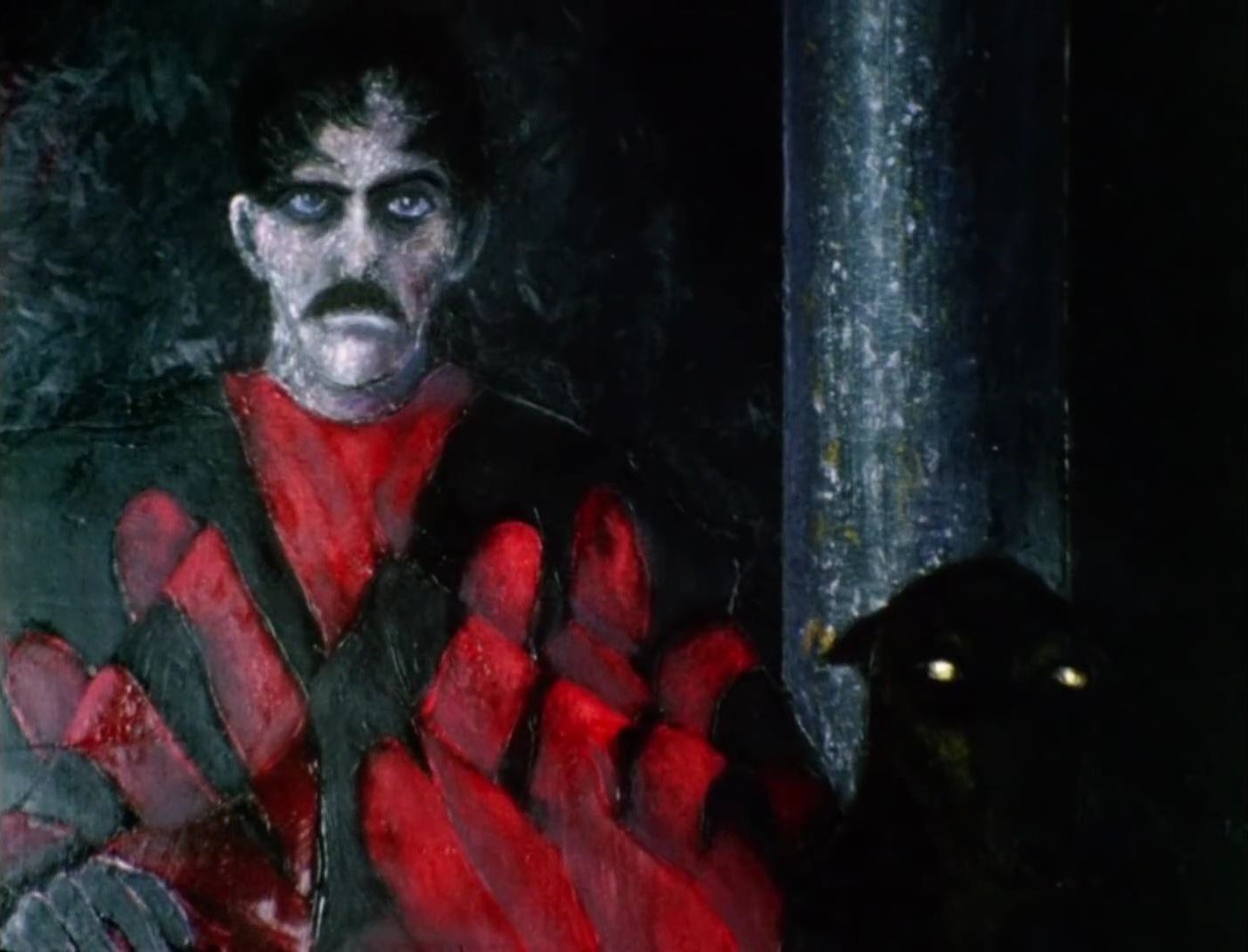
Manos: The Hands of Fate (1966) went unnoticed until the cult TV series Mystery Science Theater 3000 aired the film in 1993.

The low-budget horror film Manos: The Hands of Fate, made by El Paso insurance and fertilizer salesman Hal P. Warren, concerns a vacationing family kidnapped by a polygamous cult of pagans. The film was conceived after Warren bet Academy Award-winning screenwriter Stirling Silliphant that anyone could make a horror movie. Warren was convinced by the film's cinematographer and stunt coordinator that most of its glaring mistakes could be fixed in a Dallas post-production studio, when in reality the two wanted to quickly wrap the production because they were not being paid. Several technical gaffes made it into the film, including scenes filmed out of focus, a marking slate being seen in one shot, the scarf on the female lead's head disappearing and reappearing, and an insect bumping the camera lens. The film was shot with a camera that could not record sound and had a 32-second maximum shot length. All dialogue was later dubbed by Warren and four others, including a grown woman who dubbed the voice for a seven-year-old girl.

Manos opens with nine minutes of monotonous driving scenes reportedly intended to be overlaid with opening credits that were never added. The movie includes dialogue spoken while all characters are facing away from the camera, a character complaining about it getting dark while the sun is brightly shining, and the character Torgo, a satyr with overly large thighs, that three women attempt to massage to death. The film gained notoriety and cult popularity by being featured on Mystery Science Theater 3000, and was the show's most popular episode. The film has a rare 0% approval rating on Rotten Tomatoes, and Entertainment Weekly says the movie is "widely regarded as, quite simply, the worst movie ever made". Even Warren himself would later admit his film was one of the worst ever, suggesting it might make a passable comedy if redubbed. The film was later restored and released on Blu-ray in 2015.

=== A Place for Lovers (1968) ===
A Place for Lovers is a French-Italian romantic film directed by Vittorio De Sica (a filmmaker known for acclaimed neorealist works, such as Umberto D and The Bicycle Thieves), starring Faye Dunaway as a terminally ill American fashion designer in Venice, Italy, and Marcello Mastroianni as a race car driver who has a whirlwind affair with her. Roger Ebert of the Chicago Sun-Times called it the "most godawful piece of pseudo-romantic slop I've ever seen!" and Charles Champlin of the Los Angeles Times referred to it as "the worst movie I have seen all year and possibly since 1926". Leonard Maltin noted Ebert's comments in his review, and offered that the film was "low points for all concerned". A Place for Lovers was included as one of the choices in The Fifty Worst Films of All Time, and Vanity Fair listed it as one of the 20 worst movies ever made.

=== They Saved Hitler's Brain (1968) ===
They Saved Hitler's Brain is a science fiction film directed by David Bradley. It was adapted for TV from a shorter 1963 theatrical feature film, Madmen of Mandoras, and was lengthened by about 20 minutes with additional footage shot by UCLA students at the request of the distributor. In the film, Adolf Hitler's head was severed from his body at the end of World War II and the head plans to rule over a new Third Reich from South America. It has a 0% rating on Rotten Tomatoes, based on five reviews from critics, with an average rating of 1.3/10. TV Guide called it "One of the all-time worst", while Danny Peary said it was "A legitimate candidate for Worst Film Ever Made title." In 1979, it won the World's Worst Film Festival in Ottawa, Canada, which reportedly delighted Bradley. It has been featured in The Golden Turkey Awards and Canned Film Festival, and has been spoofed on The Simpsons multiple times.

== 1970s ==
=== Myra Breckinridge (1970) ===
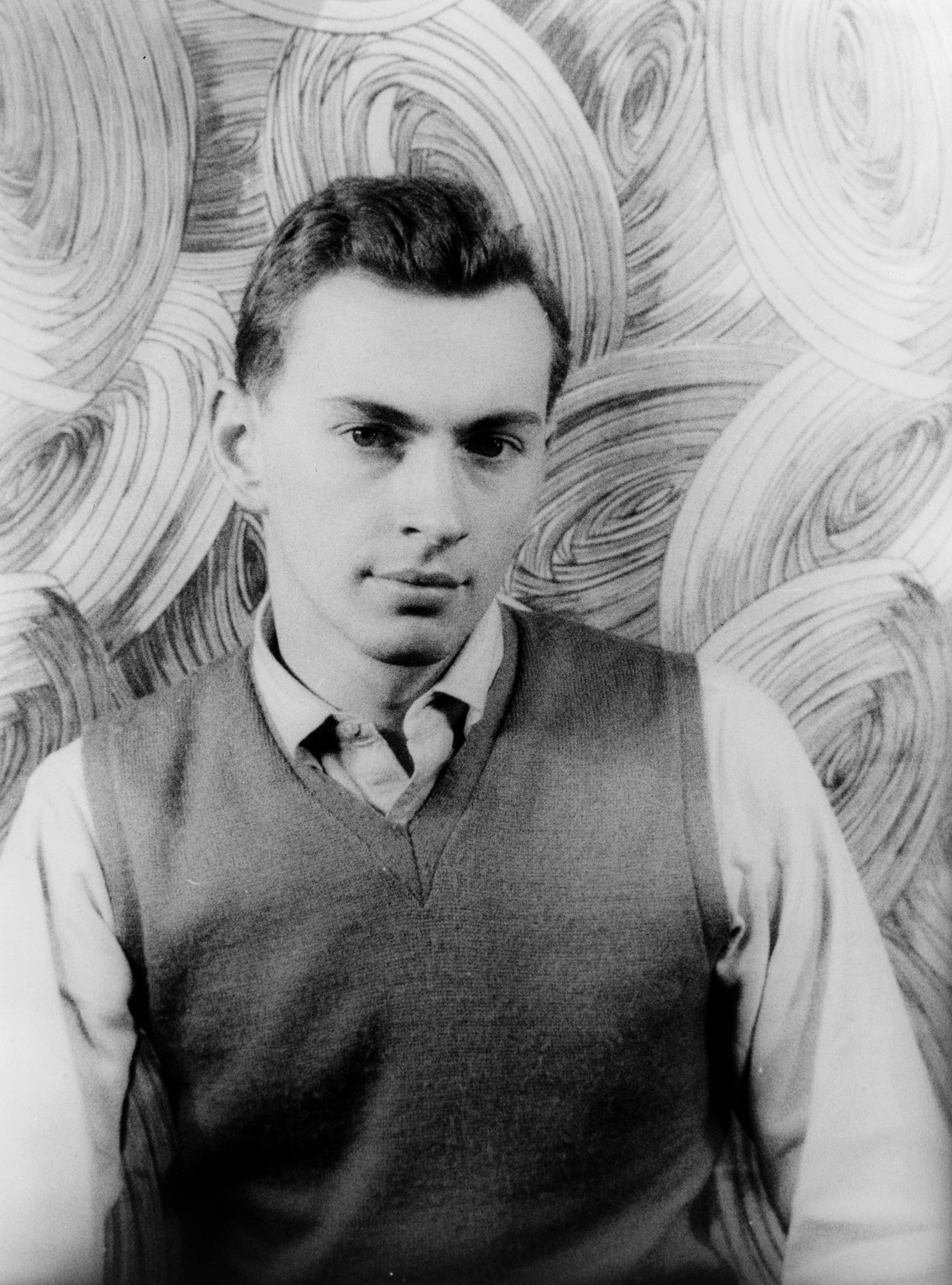
Myra Breckinridge and Caligula were based on works by author and political commentator Gore Vidal, who disowned both adaptations.

The 1970 comedy film Myra Breckinridge, based on the book of the same name by Gore Vidal, directed by Michael Sarne and starring Raquel Welch, Rex Reed, Mae West, John Huston and Farrah Fawcett, provoked controversy due to a scene in which Welch forcibly sodomizes a bound man while clips from various classic films play onscreen. The film was initially rated X before edits and an appeal to the MPAA brought it down to an R. It also used the technique of inserting clips from Golden Age movies in such a way that the dialogue took on sexual undertones. The film was a critical failure, with Time magazine saying, "Myra Breckinridge is about as funny as a child molester." Leonard Maltin gave it a BOMB (the lowest score possible) and stated that it was "as bad as any movie ever made". The Miami News critic Herb Kelly nominated Myra Breckinridge as the worst film ever made. It was also included in The Book of Lists' worst movies of all time, which claimed that there was something in it to offend absolutely everyone. Likewise, The Fifty Worst Films of All Time and Vanity Fair also listed it as one of the worst movies ever made. Gore Vidal disowned it, calling it "an awful joke", and blamed the movie for a decade-long drought in the sale of the original book.

=== Zaat (1971) ===
Directed by Don Barton, Zaat was also known under various titles including Hydra, Attack of the Swamp Creatures, Legend of the Zaat Monster, and The Blood Waters of Dr. Z (the name under which it was lampooned on Mystery Science Theater 3000). The film follows a Nazi mad scientist who injects himself with a formula that turns him into a mutated catfish. Florida Times-Union critic Matt Soergel quipped that Zaat "could very well be the best film ever made about a mutated catfish". Critic Jeffrey Kauffman said, "this is the sort of film Ed Wood, Jr. might have made—on a bad day" and added, "Lovers of fantastically bad films rate Zaat one of the worst". Patrick Naugle of DVD Verdict stated, "The acting in Zaat is below subpar. Actors seem to be whispering their lines and trying hard not to fully comprehend that they're in one of the worst films ever made", while Michael Rubino of DVD Verdict also claimed, "Zaat may be one of the worst films ever created". NPR called it a "sci-fi fiasco" when it became "the winner — er, loser —" on IMDb's Bottom 100. Zaat appeared on Mystery Science Theater 3000, which gave it significant exposure, and was also featured on RedLetterMedia's show Half in the Bag where the hosts called it one of their favorite "so bad it's good" films. Total Film included it in their list of the 66 worst films of all time.

=== An American Hippie in Israel (1972) ===
The 1972 Israeli film An American Hippie in Israel is about an American hippie traveling to Israel after being involved with the Vietnam War, befriending Israeli flower children, and encountering "menacing" mimes along the way. The film was presumed lost, but after resurfacing 38 years after its production, it became a "midnight sensation" in Tel Aviv and developed a cult following akin to The Rocky Horror Picture Show. It was then released internationally on home video by Grindhouse Releasing. Gil Shefler of The Jewish Daily Forward described it as "perfectly awful", offering that it "probably is the worst Israeli movie ever made, and a serious candidate for the worst movie of all time". Its description as "a serious candidate for the worst movie of all time" was echoed by Josh Olson in IndieWire. Ben Hartman of The Jerusalem Post stated the film was "surely one of the worst films ever made in Israel, or beyond". Nana 10 said it claims the title of "worst Israeli film and most amusing".

=== Bat Pussy (circa 1973) ===
A loose spoof of the 1966 Batman television series cited as one of the earliest examples of a pornographic parody film, the presumably-1970s pornographic film Bat Pussy has been described as the worst pornographic film ever made due to "some incredibly unarousing sex and a general attitude of awfulness". Possessing no credits or copyright information, there is no known record of Bat Pussy's existence prior to the mid-1990s, when it was discovered in the storeroom of an adult movie theater in Memphis, Tennessee, and subsequently released on home video by exploitation film distributor Something Weird Video. Gawker Media's io9 proclaimed the film to be "the absolute nadir of pornography, period. Not just Batman-themed pornography. ALL pornography", deriding its "obese redneck" cast as rendering the film "wank-proof". PornParody.com, a website dedicated to the genre, acknowledged its status as "the worst adult movie of all time", describing Bat Pussy as "renowned for its technical ineptness and anti-eroticism" due to its "physically unappealing" actors. AV Maniacs contested Bat Pussy's categorization as pornography on the grounds of the lead actor's visible erectile dysfunction and instead labeled the film "anti-porn", asking "How else do you categorize an adult film that completely and utterly fails to elicit even the minutest amount of arousal in its viewers?" The book The Many More Lives of Batman by William Uricchio and Will Brooker also labeled Bat Pussy "the worst porn film ever made", criticizing its poor adaptation of the source material.

=== At Long Last Love (theatrical version, 1975) ===
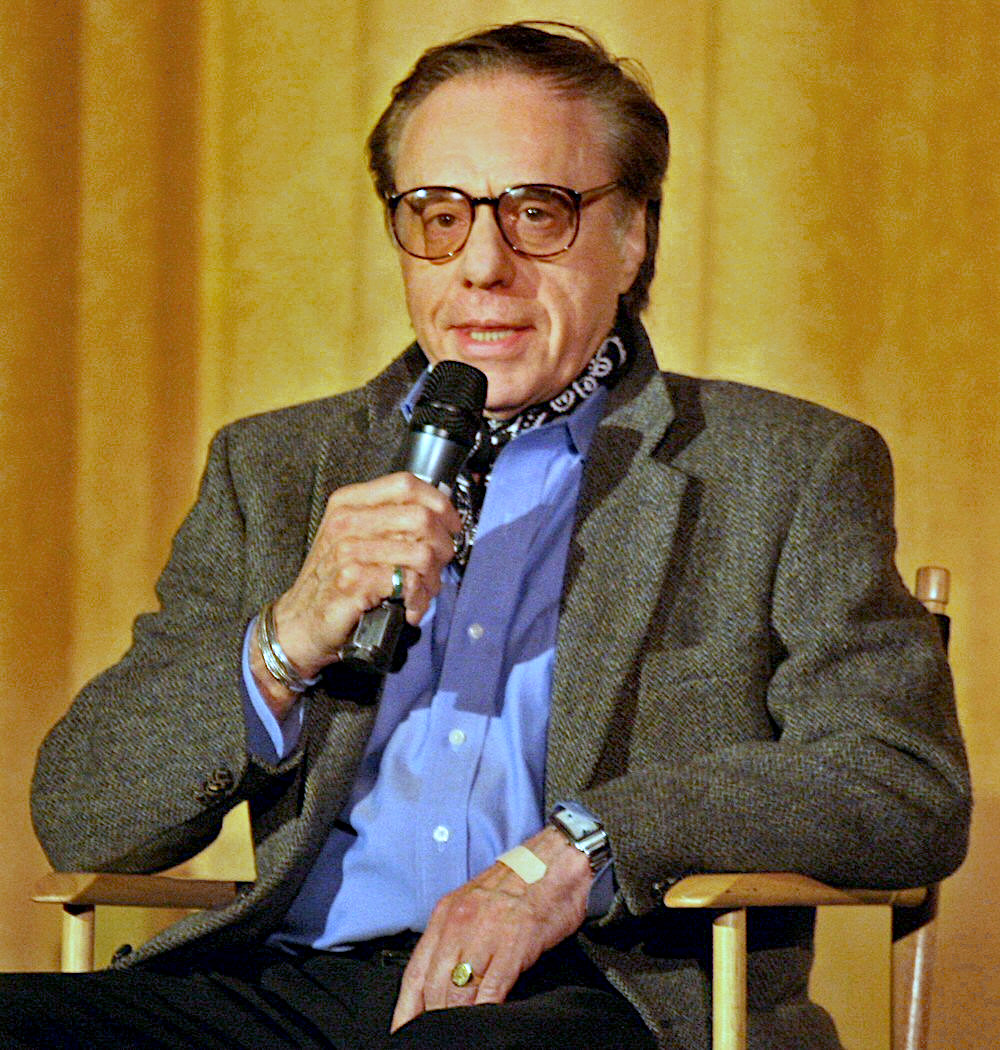
Filmmaker Peter Bogdanovich initially apologized for At Long Last Love, once described as "the worst musical extravaganza in Hollywood history", but an updated cut of the film has met with critical reevaluation.

At Long Last Love was renowned director Peter Bogdanovich's musical homage to great 1930s Hollywood musicals. It features songs by Cole Porter and stars Cybill Shepherd and Burt Reynolds. Film Threat wrote that it received "the most withering reviews any film ever received", while The Guardian reported that it was "savaged by critics at the time and viewed as one of the worst films ever". Richard Brody of The New Yorker compared it to the later critical failures of Heaven's Gate and Ishtar, writing: "critics of the time heaven's-gated [At Long Last Love], leaving Bogdanovich ishtarred and feathered". Such reviews included Hollis Alpert's, in which he said that "This failure is so dismal that it goes beyond failure", and Esquire critic John Simon's, who said that "it may be the worst movie musical of this – or any – decade". Meanwhile, Buffalo News film critic Jeff Simon wrote, "About 45 minutes in, it became apparent to one and all that this was one of the worst and most embarrassing major-talent turkeys of all time." Bogdanovich, who was also the screenwriter, sent press releases to newspapers across the country apologizing for the film.

CNN later noted that it had attained a legacy as being "the worst musical extravaganza in Hollywood history", and Jay Cocks has said the film was "regarded as the great white elephant catastrophe of its time". Lester J. Keyser wrote that it was "justly included on most lists of the ten worst films ever made", as it was included in Michael Sauter's The Worst Films of All Time, The Golden Turkey Awards and Vanity Fair's worst film list.

Bogdanovich lamented being influenced by studio previews to cut the film before its theatrical release. Unbeknownst to Bogdanovich, a studio editor who preferred the director's first cut constructed his own based on the test screening version that he once had access to. This version subsequently aired on cable TV and streamed on Netflix in place of the theatrical cut. When news of this reached Bogdanovich, he contacted Fox and made a few finishing touches, resulting in a better received director's cut that debuted on home video in 2013.

=== Exorcist II: The Heretic (1977) ===
Exorcist II: The Heretic is the sequel to William Friedkin's Oscar-winning 1973 film, this time directed by John Boorman. Friedkin opted not to return to direct the sequel and The Daily Telegraph states that Boorman "hated the original" and intended The Heretic to be an "antidote [...] to wash away the evil of Friedkin's film." Set four years after the first film, Linda Blair reprised her role as Regan MacNeil, who is revealed to have healing powers, and Richard Burton stars as Father Philip Lamont, who believes that the demon Pazuzu targets those with healing abilities. Blair agreed to return for the sequel as long as she did not have to wear the possession make-up from the first film, leading to the use of an unconvincing body double, while Burton read his lines off cue cards. Despite his character dying in the original film, Max von Sydow returned for flashback sequences set in Africa, where Lamont flies to on the back of a locust.

The Daily Telegraph notes that some consider it the worst film ever made. British film critic Mark Kermode called the original film his favorite film of all time but believes the sequel to be the worst film ever made, stating, "This is a film that trashes a work of art. It's like someone deciding to do a Mona Lisa 2, but with a moustache." The Golden Turkey Awards named it the second-worst film ever made, after Plan 9 from Outer Space, and it also appeared in The Official Razzie Movie Guide. The A.V. Club listed it as the worst sequel of all time and critic Bill Chambers stated it was "Possibly the worst film ever made and surely the worst sequel ever made." Friedkin believed the sequel diminished the value of the original film and called it "the worst piece of shit I've ever seen" and "a fucking disgrace." Eventually, the film garnered so much hate that Boorman disowned it. In an interview with Bob McCabe for the book The Exorcist: Out of the Shadows, he confessed, "The sin I committed was not giving the audience what it wanted in terms of horror." A third installment in the Exorcist franchise, The Exorcist III: Legion, was released in 1990 and would in later years gain a cult following, with author Nat Segaloff writing that, "The first rule of Exorcist III is: you do not talk about Exorcist II."

=== The Swarm (1978) ===
The Swarm is a 1978 horror film about a killer bee invasion of Texas, directed and produced by Irwin Allen. Despite its all-star cast (including Michael Caine, Henry Fonda, Richard Widmark and Olivia de Havilland), it was a box-office failure and was excoriated by reviewers. On its UK release, The Sunday Times described The Swarm as "simply the worst film ever made". Leslie Halliwell described it as a "very obvious disaster movie with risible dialogue". The Guardian article on The Swarm stated, "You could pass it all off as a sick joke, except it cost twelve million dollars, twenty-two million bees, and several years of someone's life." Barry Took, reviewing it for Punch, stated, "the story is of a banality matched only by the woodenness of the acting". Time Out magazine called The Swarm a "risibly inadequate disaster movie". The Swarm is included in several "worst movie" books, including the Medved brothers' The Golden Turkey Awards, and The Official Razzie Movie Guide. It soon gained a cult status (enough so that Warner Archive released the extended version on Blu-ray).

=== I Spit on Your Grave (1978) ===
I Spit on Your Grave became controversial for its graphic violence and lengthy depictions of gang rape. It was initially unable to find a distributor until 1980 when it received a wider release. Luke Y. Thompson of the New Times stated, "Defenders of the film have argued that it's actually pro-woman, due to the fact that the female lead wins in the end, which is sort of like saying that cockfights are pro-rooster because there's always one left standing". Critic David Keyes named I Spit on Your Grave the worst film of the 1980s and James Livingston wrote in The World Turned Inside Out that it was "a terrifically bad movie". Scott Tobias of The A.V. Club called it "one of the era's most abhorrent pieces of exploitation trash" and Patrick Naugle of DVD Verdict stated, "It's one of the most soulless, vile, and morally reprehensible things I've ever had to sit through." Roger Ebert gave the film no stars, referring to it as "A vile bag of garbage ... without a shred of artistic distinction," adding, "Attending it was one of the most depressing experiences of my life" and considered it the worst movie ever made. Gene Siskel also considered it one of the worst films ever made. Film Racket featured it as their first entry in to their "Worst Movie Ever?" series, while Vanity Fair and Flavorwire included it in their worst film lists. Despite the intense negative reception from some critics, the film has a 53% rating on Rotten Tomatoes, with IGN critic R.L. Shaffer arguing that whether the film is repulsive and exploitative or ingenious depends on what the viewer wants from the movie: "Admittedly, I Spit on Your Grave is a gruesome, deplorable little exploitation picture that, on the surface, seems to enjoy its rape sequences just as much, if not more, than the vengeance-filled finale. But on a more subtle level, the film is a surprisingly well-executed revenge story that plays like a brutally raw nerve – a terrifyingly stark view of the real horror of rape, painted by bizarre, skewed cinematography, gory violence, and a keen sense of creeping atmosphere and dread."

=== Caligula (theatrical version, 1979) ===
The 1979 erotic historical drama Caligula, directed by Tinto Brass about the infamous Roman emperor Caligula, was in part financed by Penthouse founder Bob Guccione. The film, featuring a prestigious cast (Malcolm McDowell, Helen Mirren, Peter O'Toole, and John Gielgud) is notorious for explicit scenes of sex and violence, including six minutes of hardcore porn footage filmed by Guccione and another editor without Brass' approval. Caligula earned some pre-release controversy after Gore Vidal, who had written the script, distanced himself from the film, and actress Maria Schneider, who objected to the nude scenes, walked off the set and was replaced with then-unknown Teresa Ann Savoy. Upon its release, Vidal stated that it was "easily one of the worst films ever made".

Caligula also received strongly hostile reviews from critics, who denounced its extreme scenes of sex and violence and lack of narrative coherence. Roger Ebert gave Caligula a zero-star rating, dubbing it "sickening, utterly worthless, shameful trash", accusing it of being artistically vulgar in its depiction of sex and violence, and of having technically incompetent direction and structure. It was one of the few films Ebert ever walked out on (two hours into its 170-minute running time), after describing himself as feeling "disgusted and unspeakably depressed". Ebert also placed it on his "Most Hated" list and Michael Sauter selected it for The Worst Movies of All Time. Australian newspaper The Age stated that Caligula was being "billed by critics everywhere as one of the worst films ever made". The Hamilton Spectator later referred to Caligula as "possibly the worst movie ever made". Joe Holleman, in an article in the St. Louis Post-Dispatch discussing historical films set in Ancient Rome, argued, "two of the worst movies made in the 20th century were ancient Rome pieces ... Cleopatra and Caligula". Christopher Armstead, reviewing Caligula for the website Film Critics United, stated, "Dollar for dollar, this could very well be the worst movie ever made." In 2011, Sean Bell of PopMatters wrote of its enduring legacy: "in the same way much of our attention-deficit civilisation may go through life vaguely aware that Citizen Kane is a masterpiece without ever seeing it, ... we know that Caligula is awful, usually without ever finding out for ourselves."

Although widely criticized, the film's "over-the-top combination of outré aesthetics [and] exploitation-film tropes" has gained it cult status over time, and in 2024, Thomas Negovan released an extensive re-edit, Caligula: The Ultimate Cut, incorporating alternate takes and unused footage from the Penthouse archives to enhance narrative coherence while shortening the film's overall length. In a review in The New York Times, Elisabeth Vincentelli said that it is a "rare re-edited version of a movie that features less graphic sex and violence than the original." In an interview with The Guardian, McDowell praised the removal of sexually explicit material added by Guccione, and said The Ultimate Cut is "very much the movie I thought I was making". The Ultimate Cut holds a 65% rating on Rotten Tomatoes based on 40 reviews; however, Brass has publicly disowned it.

== 1980s ==
=== Heaven's Gate (theatrical version, 1980) ===
The theatrical cut of Heaven's Gate destroyed the reputation of director Michael Cimino and bankrupted film distributor United Artists, though re-edits of the film have been met with critical reevaluation.

The Western epic Heaven's Gate, loosely based on the Johnson County War in 1890s Wyoming, was plagued by massive cost and time overruns, largely due to director Michael Cimino's extreme attention to detail. He demanded 50 takes of at least one scene and refused to start shooting for another until a cloud he liked rolled across the sky. It cost over $44 million, but brought in only $3.5 million at the box office. The original version ran at nearly four hours, but was pulled from release after only one week due to scathing reviews. It later resurfaced in a 149-minute version, but by then the damage was done. The film effectively ended not only the existence of United Artists as an independent Hollywood studio (its parent firm sold the company to Metro-Goldwyn-Mayer, where it operated until 2019), but also, largely, Cimino's career; initially considered a director on the rise after directing The Deer Hunter (which won five Oscars, including Best Picture and Best Director), his reputation never recovered after Heaven's Gate. The production is also notorious for the cruelty to animals that occurred both on screen and on site, including deliberately killing a horse with explosives. The controversies surrounding Heaven's Gate's failure are credited for having a role in ending the "auteur period" of the 1970s, with studios subsequently taking control back from directors.

Vincent Canby called it "an unqualified disaster", among other things. Roger Ebert called it "the most scandalous cinematic waste I've ever seen". After word of his grandiose spending and defiant nature toward studio United Artists got out (detailed in Final Cut by Steven Bach, a studio executive involved with the film from the beginning), Cimino was awarded the 1980 Golden Raspberry Award for Worst Director, and the film was nominated for four more Razzies, including Worst Picture. In 1999, Time placed the film on a list of the 100 worst ideas of the 20th century, and Rolling Stone ranked it as one of the worst decisions in movie history. In 2008, Joe Queenan of The Guardian called it the worst film ever made, saying that it "defies belief". Readers of film magazine Empire later voted Heaven's Gate the sixth-worst film of all time, and Vanity Fair included it in its list of the worst films ever made.

Despite the vicious reviews, the film's reputation improved over time. In fall of 2012, the New York Film Festival, the venue for its infamous opening, premiered the restored director's cut. In stark contrast, The Times called the restored version "a modern masterpiece" and its 1980 cut "one of the greatest injustices of cinematic history". The film has also been released on Blu-ray and DVD by the Criterion Collection. Manohla Dargis of The New York Times said that the film "has been called a disaster and a disgrace, yet also anointed a masterpiece". In 2023, the French magazine Télérama ranked it 17th in its list of the 100 greatest films in the history of cinema, describing the work as "a post-classical, lyrical, and disenchanted Western".

=== The Apple (1980) ===
The Apple (also called Star Rock) is a 1980 science fiction musical comedy film written and directed by Menahem Golan. It stars Catherine Mary Stewart as a young singer named Bibi, who, in a futuristic 1994, signs to an evil label named Boogalow International Music. It deals with themes of conformity versus rebellion, and makes use of Biblical allegory, including that of Adam and Eve and the rapture.

Common criticism from both reviews that appeared in trade publications and major news outlets and the audience were a lack of originality, a weak script, uninspired music, poor execution, and Golan's inexperienced take on the 1960s hippie movement. During the 1980 Montreal World Film Festival, some members of the audience threw vinyl records of music from the film at the screen. At the 1980 Stinkers Bad Movie Awards, the film received seven nominations (including Worst Picture) and won two awards: Worst Director (Golan) and Least "Special" Special Effects. Stinkers co-founder Mike Lancaster later selected The Apple as the worst film he had ever seen. The Saturday Evening Post listed it as the worst movie musical ever, and critic Tim Brayton described it as "A completely unadulterated bundle of the worst of cinema all spun up into one ball of madness. It cannot be described, and it can barely be experienced." Sean Burns in Philadelphia Weekly wrote: "The Apple isn't just the worst disco musical ever made; it could very well be the worst movie ever made, period." The Apple was included in Paste's Bad Movie Diaries column, where critic Kenneth Lowe described it as "without a doubt the most cringe-inducing, the most mortifying, the absolutely most embarrassing feature we've ever watched". It has also been covered by the How Did This Get Made? podcast and Flavorwire's Bad Movie Night column and Mental Floss listed it as one of the "Ten Really Bad Movies that Define 'Bad Movies'".

=== Inchon (1981) ===
The war film Inchon, directed by Terence Young and starring Laurence Olivier as General Douglas MacArthur, was meant to depict the Battle of Inchon during the Korean War. Producer Mitsuharu Ishii was a senior member of the Japanese branch of the Unification Church, whose leader, Sun Myung Moon, claimed he had the film made to show MacArthur's spirituality and connection to God and the Japanese people. Its eventual production cost of $46 million resulted in a $5 million box-office gross, and The New York Times review written by Vincent Canby calls the movie "the most expensive B-movie ever". The Washington Post described Inchon as "one of the biggest commercial disasters in film history". Every conceivable kind of problem plagued production, including labor issues, the U.S. military withdrawing support due to the film's Unification Church connection, weather and natural disasters, customs difficulties, expensive directorial blunders, and the original director (Andrew McLaglen) quitting before the start of production. Olivier's performance was criticized, and he was awarded the 1982 Golden Raspberry award for Worst Actor. The film itself took the 1982 Razzies for Worst Picture and Worst Screenplay, and Young's direction earned him a tie for Worst Director of 1982. A number of reviewers at various media outlets described Inchon as the worst film ever made, including The Washington Post, Newsweek, TV Guide, and the Canadian Press. Inchon was later profiled in multiple books on worst in film, including The Hollywood Hall of Shame by Harry and Michael Medved, and The Worst Movies of All Time by Michael Sauter. To date, Inchon has never been released on home video in the United States although it was aired on the church's Good Life TV Network.

=== Tarzan, the Ape Man (1981) ===
The adventure film Tarzan, the Ape Man, loosely based on the novel Tarzan of the Apes by Edgar Rice Burroughs, stars Miles O'Keeffe (who would later star in the 1982 Conan the Barbarian knock-off Ator the Invincible, which alongside its sequel featured in two episodes of the TV series Mystery Science Theater 3000) in the title role and Bo Derek as his partner Jane Parker, and is told from Jane's point of view. Despite being a box-office success, critics poorly received it upon its release due to its poor screenplay, bad acting, and unintentional humor. Leonard Maltin, writing for his Movie Guide, stated that the film "lacks action, humor and charm", and considered it so bad that it "nearly forced editors of this book to devise a rating lower than BOMB". Leslie Halliwell was equally harsh; he described Tarzan, the Ape Man as "certainly the worst of the Tarzan movies and possibly the banalest film so far made; even the animals give poor performances". Writer Thomas S. Hischak described it thus: "Produced and directed without a shred of talent by John Derek, Tarzan, the Ape Man often ranks high in the lists of the worst movies ever made." Film critic John Nesbit considered it "my pick for worst film ever", while Matt Brunson of Creative Loafing wrote, "this cinematic atrocity truly is one of the all-time worsts". Tarzan, the Ape Man was nominated for six awards at the 2nd Golden Raspberry Awards, winning one for Worst Actress (Bo Derek). It holds a 10% rating on Rotten Tomatoes based on 20 reviews.

=== Mommie Dearest (1981) ===
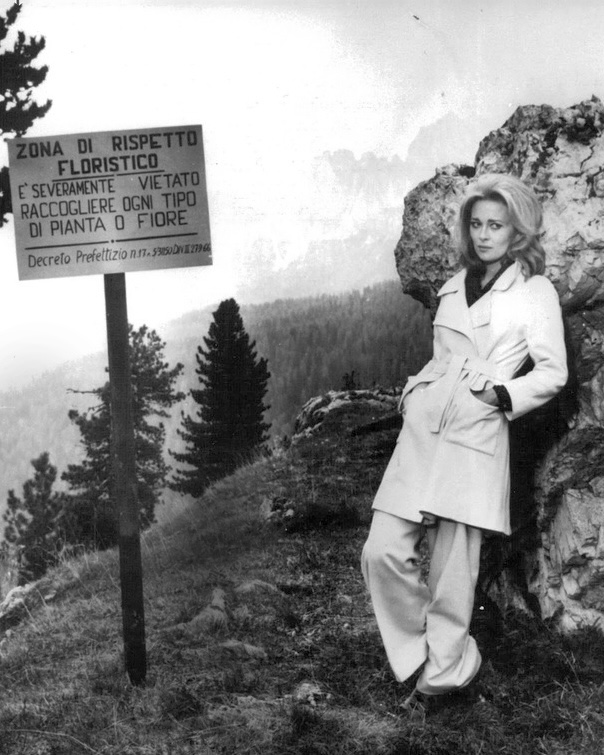
Faye Dunaway (pictured in A Place for Lovers, also on this list) regretted her Razzie-winning portrayal of actress Joan Crawford in the camp classic Mommie Dearest, yet it earned a spot at number 41 on AFI's 100 Years... 100 Heroes and Villains.

Mommie Dearest, directed by Frank Perry, was based on the memoir of the same name by Christina Crawford, about her upbringing by Joan Crawford. It was the first film to sweep the Golden Raspberry Awards nominations, winning a total of five Razzies out of the nine nominations, including "Worst Picture" and Worst Actress (Faye Dunaway, shared with Bo Derek). The same organization also named it "Worst Picture of the Decade" in 1989/90, and was nominated for "Worst Drama of Our First 25 Years" in 2004/05. The film is part of the "100 most awful" in The Official Razzie Movie Guide and Michael Sauter's The Worst Movies of All Time. It earned, as film critic and TV host Richard Crouse put it, "some of the nastiest reviews ever". Eric Henderson of CBS Minneapolis named it at the top of his "Best 'Worst Movies Ever'" list. Roger Ebert wrote of this film, "I can't imagine who would want to subject themselves to this movie. 'Mommie Dearest' is a painful experience that drones on endlessly, as Joan Crawford's relationship with her daughter, Christina, disintegrates from cruelty through jealousy into pathos." Of the performance of Faye Dunaway, Variety said "Dunaway does not chew scenery. Dunaway starts neatly at each corner of the set in every scene and swallows it whole, co-stars and all." Vanity Fair and Rotten Tomatoes subsequently included Mommie Dearest on their worst film lists.

Despite the reviews at the time, the film was a box-office success, grossing $25 million worldwide on a $5 million budget. It has a 50% approval rating on Rotten Tomatoes based on 46 reviews. The site's consensus reads, "Mommie Dearest certainly doesn't lack for conviction, and neither does Faye Dunaway's legendary performance as a wire-wielding monster; unfortunately, the movie is too campy and undisciplined to transcend guilty pleasure".

=== Dünyayı Kurtaran Adam (The Man Who Saves the World) (1982) ===
The Turkish science-fiction adventure Dünyayı Kurtaran Adam (also commonly known as Turkish Star Wars) was directed by Çetin İnanç and starred Cüneyt Arkın. It is notorious for illegally using footage from well-known science fiction films and shows, most notably Star Wars, along with stealing the music score from films such as Moonraker and Raiders of the Lost Ark. The film is also criticized for its nonsensical plot, badly written dialogue, and crude special effects. It is also a fantasy martial arts film, heavily influenced by 1970s Hong Kong martial arts films from Golden Harvest.

Jos Kirps of ArticlesBase called it "The Worst Movie Ever", and stated, "There are many bad sci-fi movies, and for many years movie addicts even considered Ed Wood's Plan 9 From Outer Space the worst movie of all times. But Plan 9 is still a pretty good movie when compared to Dünyayi Kurtaran Adam." Sabah called it the "world's worst film". Hürriyet described the film as "sitting on the throne of the king" when compared to other "so bad it's good" cult films. Toronto Standard called it a "dollar-store Star Wars" and compared it to the works of Ed Wood. When it became apparent that the film had inspired an enthusiastic international cult, a sequel, The Son of the Man Who Saved the World (Dünyayı Kurtaran Adam'ın Oğlu), was shot in 2006 and featured many returning members of the original cast and crew. The film was included on Time Out's 40 Best Bad Movies Ever Made list.

=== Howard the Duck (1986) ===
Directed by Willard Huyck, written by Huyck and Gloria Katz, and produced by George Lucas, it is based on the Marvel Comics character of the same name. Howard the Duck received overwhelmingly negative reviews from film critics. Orange Coast Magazine writer Marc Weinberg and Leonard Maltin criticized the decision to shoot the film in live action. The appearance of Howard was criticized as being unconvincing due to his poorly functioning mouth and expressionless face. Reviewers also criticized the acting and humor and found the film boring. Dave Kehr of the Chicago Tribune said the movie's "crude, often embarrassing, sex jokes" seemed "out of place" with the more innocent aspects of the film. Jay Carr of The Boston Globe claimed that "They Don't Get Much Worse Than Howard", Glenn Heath Jr. of Slant Magazine wrote that it "has a rightful place in the canon of worst films ever", and TV Guide states it is "one of the worst big-budget movies ever made". It was featured in Empire's poll of the 50 worst films ever made, and Screen Rant and Vanity Fair have included it on their worst film lists.

Rotten Tomatoes gives the film a score of 13% based on 86 reviews, making it the lowest-rated Lucasfilm production of those reviewed on the site. The site's consensus states: "While it has its moments, Howard the Duck suffers from an uneven tone and mediocre performances." It received seven Golden Raspberry Award nominations in 1987 including Worst Supporting Actor (Tim Robbins), Worst Director (Willard Huyck) and Worst Original Song ("Howard the Duck"). It won four trophies for Worst Screenplay, Worst New Star ("the six guys and gals in the duck suit"), Worst Visual Effects, and Worst Picture, tied with Under the Cherry Moon. The movie also won a Stinkers Bad Movie Awards for Worst Picture. The negative reaction to the film took its toll on the cast, who found themselves unable to work on other projects as a result.

Over time, the film has remained a source of fascination and developed "a small, but loyal fanbase". Howard the Duck has appeared in several Marvel Cinematic Universe movies and series beginning in 2014's Guardians of the Galaxy, in which he was voiced by Seth Green.

=== Ishtar (1987) ===
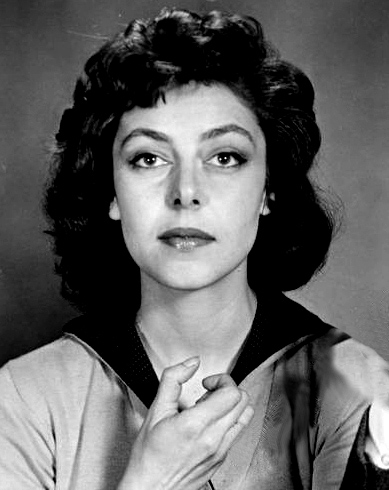
Ishtar director Elaine May defended her 1987 box office flop, stating, "If all of the people who hate Ishtar had seen it, I would be a rich woman today."

Ishtar was written and directed by Elaine May and starred Oscar-winning duo Warren Beatty and Dustin Hoffman as an ode to the Road to... film series featuring Bing Crosby and Bob Hope. Beatty and Hoffman star as Rogers and Clarke, two untalented lounge singers who travel to Morocco in hopes of finding a gig. Due to unanticipated problems with filming in the desert—which resulted in numerous reshoots—the film ran over budget by $30 million. While its final budget cost was $55 million, Ishtar earned only $14,375,181 at the North American box office, leading Ishtar to become synonymous with "box-office flop". It was also subject to harsh reviews from critics. The film was nominated for Worst Picture and Worst Screenplay in the 8th Golden Raspberry Awards, winning one for Worst Director. The San Jose Mercury News claimed that "Time has not improved this film's reputation as being one of the worst ever made." Time Out suggested it was "so bad it could have been deliberate", and called it "one of the worst films ever made", while Ed Morrissey referred to it as "The Citizen Kane of big-budget, A-list vehicular homicides." It was included in Michael Sauter's The Worst Movies of All Time book, Rotten Tomatoes placed it amongst "25 Movies So Bad They're Unmissable" and Richard Roeper included it on his list of the 40 worst films he had ever seen. In 1999, Time placed the film on a list of the 100 worst ideas of the 20th century.

The film has since become a cult classic. Ishtar has seen a minor critical re-evaluation from some critics like Richard Brody, and directors Quentin Tarantino, Edgar Wright, and Martin Scorsese have praised it in interviews. Gary Larson, who initially lampooned the movie in The Far Side, said he regrets writing that cartoon because he based it solely on Ishtar's reputation, and that he enjoyed the film when he later watched it. As of December 2022, it is the only cartoon he has publicly admitted to regretting. Defenders argue that the studio did not back May, resulting in a public relations disaster before it was released in theaters. Joe Queenan compared the film to another comedy film considered the worst, Gigli, and wrote that although it was considered one of the worst films ever made at the time of its release, it "has several comic moments" and does not get worse on subsequent viewings, unlike Gigli.

=== Leonard Part 6 (1987) ===
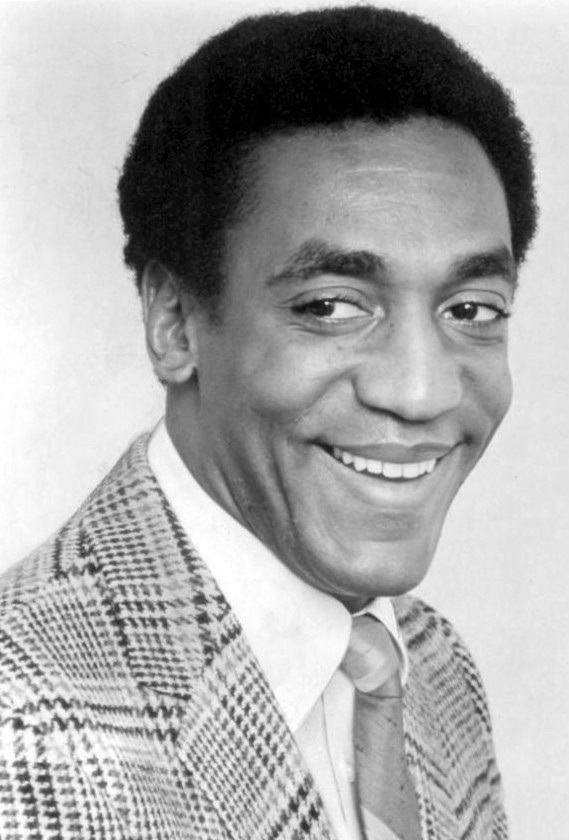
Bill Cosby became the first person to accept a Golden Raspberry Award for Leonard Part 6, which he admitted was the worst movie ever made.

Leonard Part 6, starring (as well as written and produced by) Bill Cosby, was intended as a parody of spy movies. Leonard Parker, a former CIA spy, is brought out of retirement to save the world from an evil vegetarian who brainwashes animals to kill people. Rita Kempley at The Washington Post noted the large number of Coca-Cola product placements and said "The only good thing about Bill Cosby's Leonard Part 6 is that we didn't have to see Parts 1 through 5." Scott Weinberg at DVD Talk noted the film as "truly one of the worst movies you'll ever see ... movies this bad should be handled with Teflon gloves and a pair of tongs". By 1990, Dennis King of the Tulsa World wrote that the film had "become synonymous with 'bomb'". Total Film and Vanity Fair subsequently included Leonard Part 6 on their respective worst film lists. Cosby himself disowned the film, and when it was released to theaters he publicly advised people not to see it. It earned Golden Raspberrys for Worst Actor (Cosby), Worst Picture, and Worst Screenplay. It was also nominated for two more Razzie Awards, for Worst Supporting Actress and Worst Director. Cosby became the first person to accept a Golden Raspberry Award, and said "It was the worst movie I ever made – the worst movie anyone ever made".

=== Nukie (1987) ===
Nukie is a 1987 South African film directed by Sias Odendaal (credited as Sias Odendal) and Michael Pakleppa, and starring Steve Railsback, Ronald France, and Glynis Johns. The plot concerns an alien, Nukie, who crash lands on Earth and seeks help from two children to reunite with his brother, Miko, who has been captured by the United States government. The film is considered to be a knock-off of Steven Spielberg's 1982 film E.T. the Extra-Terrestrial. Witney Seibold of /Film writes that "Nukie is only remarkable for how undeniably terrible it is", noting that it appears on lists of the worst films ever made. Comic Book Resources note that it is "regarded as one of the worst movies ever made", with critic Brad Jones selecting Nukie as the worst film he has ever seen, and Red Letter Media calling it "Possibly one of the worst films ever made." Total Film write that it is considered by some to be the "most painful movie ever made"; they listed Nukie the worst kids' movie ever made and one of the worst science-fiction films ever made. The film's co-director, Michael Pakleppa, referred to Nukie as "the most wrong-gone thing [he had] ever done in [his] life" and feared that the final product was "the worst film on Earth".

=== The Garbage Pail Kids Movie (1987) ===
The Garbage Pail Kids Movie is a 1987 live-action adaptation of the then-popular trading card series of the same name, itself a gross-out parody of the then-popular Cabbage Patch Kids dolls co-created by Pulitzer Prize-winning cartoonist Art Spiegelman. The film is often criticized for its gross-out humor, nonsensical plot, poor explanations, bad acting, and the unsettling appearance of the Garbage Pail Kids (the title characters are depicted by dwarf actors in low-budget costumes, with poorly functioning mouths and expressionless faces). It has a 0% rating on Rotten Tomatoes. On Metacritic, the film holds a score of 1, making it tied for the lowest scoring film on the site. Caryn James of The New York Times said the movie is "too repulsive for children or adults of any age" and is "enough to make you believe in strict and faraway boarding schools". Carlos Coto of the Sun-Sentinel called it "one of the worst ever made". Internet critic Doug Walker, best known for the series Nostalgia Critic, stated in a 2012 video that it was not only the worst film he had ever reviewed as the Nostalgia Critic, but the worst movie he had ever seen overall, deeming that the film served to undermine its own moral. His mother had forbidden him from seeing it as a child, stating, "I, by all the heavenly blessings, thank my mother for stopping me from seeing this movie, because I'm very convinced that this movie would've taken away half my brain." In 2025, Walker released an updated list of the worst films he had reviewed, with The Garbage Pail Kids Movie once again taking the top spot.

Much of the film's content is said to be inappropriate for children, its intended audience. Throughout the movie, the Garbage Pail Kids steal, get in fights, bite people's toes off, flatulate in people's faces, threaten others with switchblades, urinate upon themselves, and run over cars. In addition to scatological behavior, the movie has several scenes that feature sexual images, violence, and drinking. Offended parents launched a nationwide protest of the movie that successfully resulted in the movie being withdrawn from circulation. The shortened release contributed to the movie's poor gross of only $1,576,615. It was nominated for three Razzies at the 8th Golden Raspberry Awards: Worst Visual Effects, Worst New Star for the Garbage Pail Kids collectively, and Worst Original Song.

=== Silent Night, Deadly Night Part 2 (1987) ===
Silent Night, Deadly Night Part 2 is the sequel to the 1984 Christmas-themed slasher film Silent Night, Deadly Night, which faced protests from parent groups and sharp criticism from At the Movies hosts Roger Ebert and Gene Siskel due to its promotional campaign featuring an ax-wielding Santa Claus. The film was a financial success despite the controversy, leading producers to enlist Lee Harry to repurpose its footage for a new project; however, $100,000 was eventually allocated to shoot additional original material. Nearly half of the Silent Night, Deadly Night Part 2's runtime consists of flashbacks to the first film, narrated by Ricky Caldwell (Eric Freeman), the brother of the original film's protagonist, as he recounts events before embarking on his own murderous rampage.

Much of the film's reception and legacy centers on Freeman's performance, which Flavorwire states "may very well be the single worst performance ever committed to celluloid". A scene in which Ricky shouts "garbage day!" before shooting and killing a bystander taking out his trash became an Internet meme after being uploaded to YouTube in its early years. Screen Rant has since deemed the film to be "a masterpiece of the so bad it's good variety", and "one of the worst movies ever made" Emmett O'Regan of Comic Book Resources also selected it as the worst movie ever made, and an article in Paste asserted that: "in terms of filmmaking quality—it's hard to believe that in terms of pure, unadulterated crap, anything could ever surpass it." Additionally, Flavorwire, /Film, and Paste have all listed it as the worst Christmas film ever made. Time Out and Flavorwire later included it on their respective lists of the worst films ever made.

=== Hobgoblins (1988) ===
Hobgoblins, by Rick Sloane, is widely considered a low-budget knock-off that capitalizes on the popularity of the 1984 film Gremlins. It gained popularity in 1998 after being featured on an episode of Mystery Science Theater 3000. MST3K writer Paul Chaplin later commented on Hobgoblins, saying, "Oh, man. You have no idea the torture it was to watch this movie several times in the space of a week. It shoots right to the top of the list of the worst movies we've ever done." Specific points of the film that were lampooned were the extreme misogyny and atrocious treatment of women; the film's technical incompetence and repetitive scenes; its asinine, poorly conceived plot; its dreadful acting; and its ugly look and gratuitous vulgarity, particularly in regards to its characters and subject matter. David Cornelius of DVD Talk stated, "There's not one aspect of this movie that isn't the Worst Thing Ever." The Standard's Bad Horror Club noted its status as one of the worst films of all time, commenting: "it's so preposterously badly made, terribly acted and ineptly constructed that it makes for some of the most fun you can ever have watching a movie."

Sloane has embraced Hobgoblins' status as one of the worst films of all time, stating that he fears that it will be forgotten if it is removed from IMDb's user-generated bottom 100 list. After seeing the MST3K episode himself, Sloane was inspired to direct a sequel, which was released in 2009. In addition to IMDb, it has been featured on lists from Flavorwire and Total Film, and ComicBook.com placed it at the top of their list of "Terrible Movies That Are So Bad They're A Must-Watch".

=== Mac and Me (1988) ===
Mac and Me is about a young boy in a wheelchair who meets and befriends an alien who has crash-landed on Earth. A box-office failure, the film grossed $6,424,112 in the United States on a $13 million budget. It used to have a 0% rating on Rotten Tomatoes, whose critical consensus notes that it is "duly infamous" as both an imitation of E.T. the Extra-Terrestrial (1982), and a marketing vehicle for McDonald's and Coca-Cola (the filmmakers had admitted a profit-sharing arrangement with the former). Leonard Maltin described the film as being "more like a TV commercial than a movie", and Marjorie Baumgarten of the Austin Chronicle called it a "shameless E.T. knockoff". Mac and Me is widely regarded as one of the worst films ever made, with The Telegraph reporting that it is "frequently pulled out in 'worst film of all time' arguments". Filmmaker Morgan Spurlock (responsible for the 2004 Oscar-nominated Super Size Me) declared it the "worst thing you'll ever see in your entire life", as well as the most egregious example of product placement in cinema history. The film was also named the worst ever in the San Francisco Chronicle, as well as by broadcaster Simon Mayo and writer/producer Damon Lindelof. Michael Hayden of GQ India referred to it as "hands down the worst family movie in Hollywood history". The film was nominated for four Razzie Awards including Worst Picture and Worst Screenplay, and won two trophies: Worst Director for Stewart Raffill (tied with Blake Edwards for Sunset) and Worst New Star for Ronald McDonald in a cameo. Mac and Me has however gained a cult following and was featured on the second season of the Mystery Science Theater 3000 revival (the only Razzie-winning film ever to be riffed in the history of the show).

=== Things (1989) ===
Things, a 1989 Canadian low budget, independent, shot on video horror exploitation film, was written and produced by Andrew Jordan and Barry J. Gillis. It cost approximately $35,000 in total to make and marked the mainstream film debut of porn star Amber Lynn. It was ostensibly made as homage to horror icons and films, such as George A. Romero and his Night of the Living Dead franchise. Adam Symchuk of Screen Rant wrote: "While films like The Room and Birdemic seem to be constant contenders for the best 'so bad it's good' movie, [Things] is the true unheralded champion among many cinephiles." Likewise, Jeff Kirschner of Dread Central nominated it as the worst movie ever made and Will Pfeifer opined that "It's so terrible I can't think of another movie that even comes close." In 2022, RiffTrax concluded that Things was the worst movie that they had ever spoofed.

== 1990s ==
=== Troll 2 (1990) ===
Despite its title, Troll 2 does not feature any trolls (the antagonists are actually goblins) and has no relation to the original 1986 film. Troll 2 was produced under the title "Goblins", but the title was changed by American distributors. In the film, an American family vacations to the town of Nilbog (goblin spelled backwards), where vegetarian goblins attempt to turn the family into edible plants. It was shot in Utah and the cast was composed of local amateur actors. A language barrier developed between the cast and the Italian crew, led by director Claudio Fragasso, who had translated the script to English. The bad acting and dialogue have become notorious for their camp value, with individual scenes having become Internet memes. In 2009, Michael Stephenson, the child star of Troll 2, released Best Worst Movie, a documentary exploring the film's tumultuous production and its unexpected cult following.

NPR reports that it is "known as the worst movie of all time" while The A.V. Club calls it "a popular candidate for the worst film ever made". Likewise, TV Guide proclaimed that "Troll 2 is really as bad as they come", and Ken Hanke of Mountain Xpress stated in his review that: "There are movies that are bad. There are movies that are so-bad-they're-good. And then there's Troll 2—a movie that's so bad that it defies comprehension." Troll 2 regularly appears on lists of films considered the worst, including: Flavorwire, Fotogramas, IGN, Rotten Tomatoes, Screen Rant, and Time Out. Furthermore, Collider named it the most rewatchable bad movie of all time.

=== Highlander II: The Quickening (theatrical version, 1991) ===
The French-British film Highlander II: The Quickening is a sequel to the 1986 cult film Highlander, which transitions the fantasy of the original film into science fiction, and retcons the mystical warriors of the first film into aliens. It received a harsh reception from both critics and audiences, as it has a 0% score on Rotten Tomatoes and appears on its 100 Worst Movies of All Time. Common criticisms included the lack of motivation for the characters, blatant disregard for backstory from the first film (such as the new and seemingly incongruent origin for the Immortals and the unexplained resurrection of Ramírez), glaring plot holes, a messy and nonsensical story structure, the filmmaker's inability to balance unrelated plots and subplots, and obvious contradictions in the film's internal logic. In selecting it as the worst movie sequel of all time, Comic Book Resources also wrote that "it is typically considered one of the worst films of all time'. Roger Ebert named it the worst film of 1991, stating: "If there is a planet somewhere whose civilization is based on the worst movies of all time, Highlander 2: The Quickening deserves a sacred place among their most treasured artifacts." An IGN review said: "How bad is this movie? Well, imagine if Ed Wood were alive today, and someone gave him a multi-million dollar budget. See his imagination running rampant, bringing in aliens from outer space with immensely powerful firearms, immortals who bring each other back to life by calling out their names, epic duels on flying skateboards, and a blatant disregard for anything logical or previously established—now you are starting to get closer to the vision of Highlander II." Screen Rant has since included it on its list of the 25 worst films of all time.

In 1995, the film's director Russell Mulcahy made a director's cut version known as Highlander 2: Renegade Version and then later released another version simply known as Highlander 2: The Special Edition for its 2004 DVD release. The film was reconstructed on both occasions largely from existing material, with certain scenes removed and others added back in, and the entire sequence of events changed. The reconstructed film's reception was far better than the original's; it was elevated to a mixed reception.

=== Super Mario Bros. (1993) ===
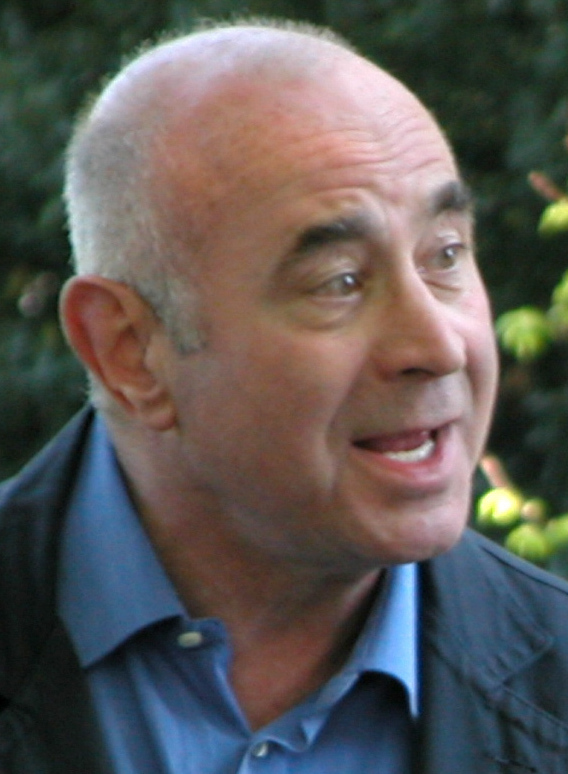
Oscar-nominated actor Bob Hoskins (pictured in 2006) described Super Mario Bros. as "the worst thing I ever did" later in his life.

The first feature-length live-action film based on a video game, Super Mario Bros. was directed by the husband-and-wife team of Rocky Morton and Annabel Jankel (known for their work on Max Headroom). It follows the brothers Mario (Bob Hoskins) and Luigi (John Leguizamo), plumbers who venture into a parallel universe to rescue Princess Daisy (Samantha Mathis) from the villainous King Koopa (Dennis Hopper). The Super Mario series' publisher, Nintendo, believed the Mario franchise was strong enough for experimentation and gave the filmmakers free creative license. The finished film bears little resemblance to the games, trading their colorful Mushroom Kingdom for a dystopic world populated by humanoid dinosaurs. SyFy Wire wrote: "Some movies are so bad that they're secretly good. Super Mario Bros. is so bad it crushes your spirit. It's unfathomably terrible." The film was criticized for its inconsistent tone, complex narrative, and lack of faithfulness to the source material. According to Variety, Super Mario Bros. is a mainstay on lists compiling the worst films of all time. It was voted the sixth worst film of all time by RiffTrax in 2012, and IGN ranked it among the "best worst movies ever made" in 2021. Author David Bodanis, in his 2020 book The Art of Fairness, called Super Mario Bros. "the worst movie ever made".

In addition to scathing reviews, Super Mario Bros. was a box-office bomb, and Morton and Jankel were "blacklisted" as directors in Hollywood. In a 2007 interview, Hoskins said: "The worst thing I ever did? Super Mario Bros. It was a fuckin' nightmare. The whole experience was a nightmare. It had a husband-and-wife team directing, whose arrogance had been mistaken for talent. After so many weeks their own agent told them to get off the set! Fuckin' nightmare. Fuckin' idiots." In a 2011 interview, he was asked, "What is the worst job you've done?", "What has been your biggest disappointment?", and "If you could edit your past, what would you change?" His answer to all three was Super Mario Bros. The film made Nintendo wary of licensing its works to film studios, and it did not license Mario again until it collaborated with Illumination for The Super Mario Bros. Movie (2023) three decades later. Seth Rogen, who voiced Donkey Kong in the 2023 film, called Super Mario Bros. one of the worst films ever made and what "made me realize that movies, like, could be bad. That never occurred to me until that moment."

=== North (1994) ===
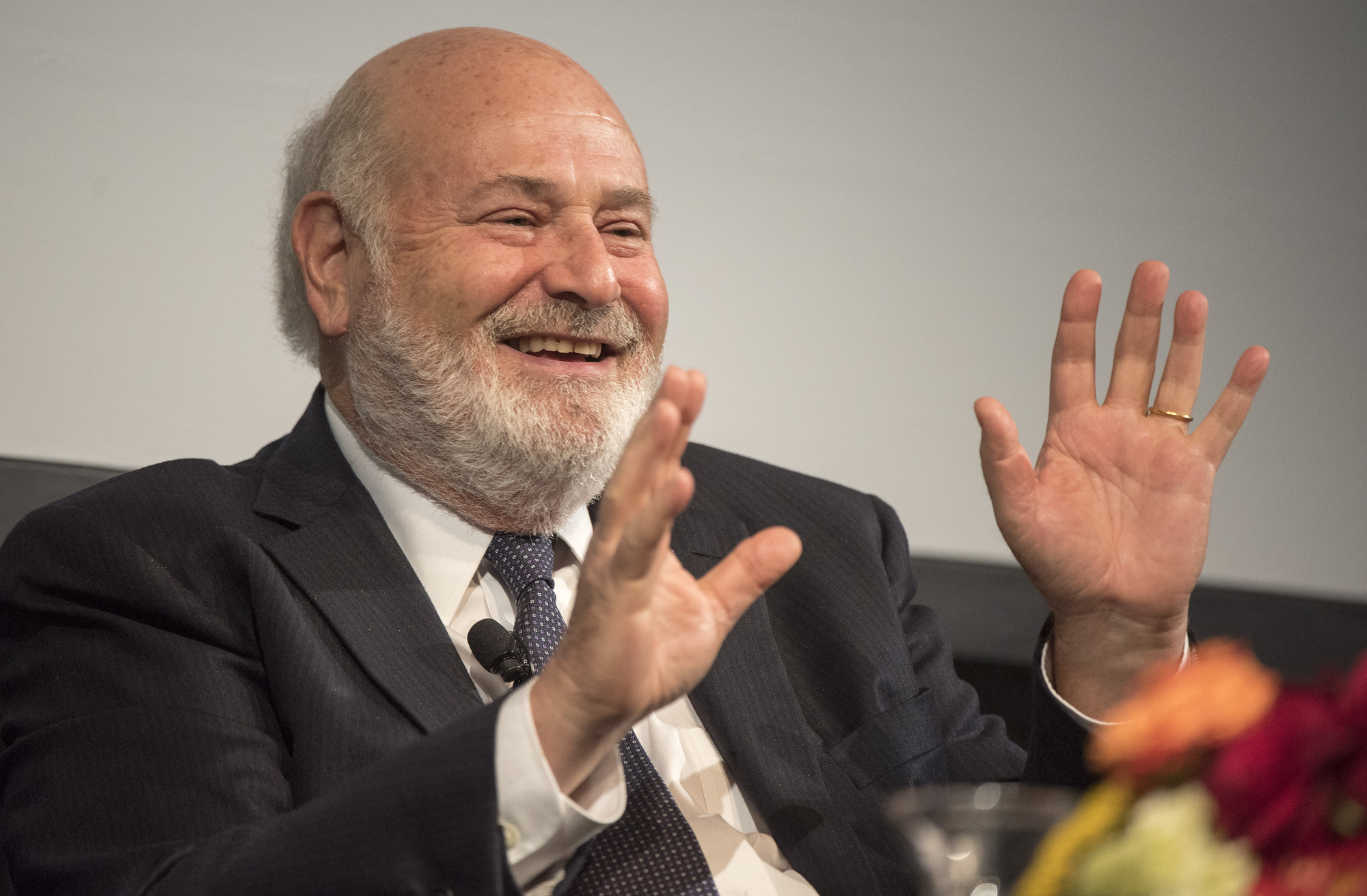
Actor/director Rob Reiner (pictured in 2016) made the family film North (1994), which was panned by critics to the point that Roger Ebert famously declared he "hated, hated, hated this movie" on the film review show Siskel and Ebert at the Movies.

The Rob Reiner film North is an adaptation of the novel North: The Tale of a 9-Year-Old Boy Who Becomes a Free Agent and Travels the World in Search of the Perfect Parents by Alan Zweibel, who also wrote the screenplay and has a minor role in the film. North, which stars Elijah Wood in the title role and also marked Scarlett Johansson's film debut, was a critical and commercial failure, earning only $7,138,449 worldwide despite its budget of over $40 million. It was widely criticized for its plot, its cast of insensitive characters, lack of humor and portrayal of numerous ethnic stereotypes (especially Alaskan Inuit). It has a 14% approval rating at Rotten Tomatoes. Roger Ebert gave it zero stars and wrote, "I hated this movie. Hated hated hated hated hated this movie. Hated it. Hated every simpering stupid vacant audience-insulting moment of it. Hated the sensibility that thought anyone would like it. Hated the implied insult to the audience by its belief that anyone would be entertained by it." He continued saying "North is a bad film – one of the worst movies ever made", and it is also on his list of most hated films. Both Ebert and Gene Siskel named North as the worst film of 1994. Mick LaSalle of the San Francisco Chronicle said in his review that "North is director Rob Reiner's first flat-out failure, a sincerely wrought, energetically made picture that all the same crashes on takeoff. It's strange and oddly distasteful, at its best managing to be bad in some original and unexpected ways." Richard Roeper named North as one of the 40 worst movies he has ever seen, saying that, "Of all the films on this list, North may be the most difficult to watch from start to finish." The film was nominated for the following awards at the 15th Golden Raspberry Awards: Worst Picture, Worst Actor (Bruce Willis, also for Color of Night), Worst Supporting Actress (Kathy Bates), Worst Supporting Actor (Dan Aykroyd, also for Exit to Eden), Worst Director, and Worst Screenplay (Andrew Scheinman and Alan Zweibel).

=== Dis – en historie om kjærlighet (A Story About Love) (1995) ===
The Norwegian romantic film Dis – en historie om kjærlighet was directed by Aune Sand. The film follows different couples and their love stories around the world, in Cairo, Normandy, Oslo and New York City. Dis received universally poor reviews by critics, and has been called the most poorly reviewed Norwegian film in history. Critic Harald Kolstad of Dagsavisen gave it a score of zero, refused to acknowledge Dis as a film, and claimed to have never seen anything worse. Aftenposten referred to the film as "the largest turkey" and "the most reviled film", and Total Film included it on its list of the 66 worst films ever made. Despite being a critical disaster it became a commercial success, gaining cult film status with a following akin to The Rocky Horror Picture Show, with fans embracing its "so bad it's good" qualities. Director Aune Sand insists that Dis is a masterpiece.

=== Showgirls (1995) ===
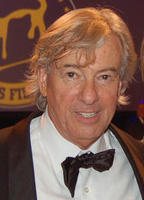
Director Paul Verhoeven, whose Showgirls earned a record 13 Golden Raspberry Award nominations, was the first person to attend the ceremony and accept the awards in person.

Hype for Paul Verhoeven's erotic drama Showgirls focused on the sex and nudity in this NC-17 French-American film with a $45 million budget, but the final result was critically derided. Much hype revolved around the film's star, Elizabeth Berkley, who only two years before had starred in the lighthearted and chaste teen sitcom Saved by the Bell. The film won seven Razzie Awards, a record at that time, and received 13 nominations, a record that still stands. It received an additional award at the 20th Golden Raspberry Awards, where it was awarded Worst Picture of the Decade. Kenneth Turan of the Los Angeles Times called it, "a film of thunderous oafishness that gives adult subject matter the kind of bad name it does not need or deserve". Michael Dequina of TheMovieReport.com also criticized the film, claiming that it was "the best bad filmmaking Hollywood has to offer". Adam White wrote in The Independent that it was "the worst movie ever made" but also a masterpiece. Stephen Lynch of the Knight Ridder/Tribune similarly named it the worst movie ever made, calling it "so bad it may be brilliant". Various sources have since included Showgirls in their respective lists of the worst films ever made, including: Rotten Tomatoes, Empire, Screen Rant, Vanity Fair, and Flavorwire. Showgirls was also featured in Michael Sauter's The Worst Movies of All Time as well as The Official Razzie Movie Guide. Despite being a critical failure and failing at the box office initially, Showgirls found success as a camp cult film, particularly among the LGBT community, but whether the film was intended to be satirical remains subject to debate. On the home video market, the film was MGM's most profitable release for years.

=== The Scarlet Letter (1995) ===
A "freely adapted" version of the 1850 romantic novel by Nathaniel Hawthorne, directed by Roland Joffé and starring Demi Moore and Gary Oldman. The film met with universally negative reviews and was a box-office bomb, grossing $10.4 million against a production budget of $46 million. Multiple critics named the film the worst of 1995.

Chris Hicks of the Deseret News argued that its deviation from the source material represents "Hollywood's arrogance in its purest form". The Washington Post's Amy E. Schwartz reported that the "nutty" film was described by numerous reviewers as the worst they had ever seen. Kevin Williamson of National Review observed a "combination of awfulness and inexplicability", and claimed that "any objective and authoritative analysis will reveal that the worst film ever made is Demi Moore's version of The Scarlet Letter". Sadie Trombetta of Bustle wrote that it "has earned an almost permanent spot on every 'Worst Movie of All Time' list", while author Libby Fischer Hellmann noted that it is "widely cited as the worst film adaptation ever made". The film was nominated for seven Golden Raspberry Awards, winning "Worst Remake or Sequel". Furthermore, Roger Ebert placed the film on his "most hated" list.

=== Bio-Dome (1996) ===
The 1996 comedy film Bio-Dome focuses on two moronic stoner best friends, played by Pauly Shore and Stephen Baldwin, who accidentally get trapped inside of the Bio-Dome, a hermetically sealed ecological system whose owner is played by Henry Gibson, after mistaking it for a mall while looking for a bathroom.

For MTV News, Eric Snider wrote in 2008 that "nothing can account for...the movie Bio-Dome, which is–and I do not make this assertion lightly–the worst crime ever perpetrated against humanity throughout all of recorded history". Snider went on to call it "quite bad" and "certainly one of the worst comedies" he had ever seen, criticizing Pauly Shore's performance as unfunny and the film's writing as stupid. Syfy Wire's Cassidy Ward described Bio-Dome as "one of the best-worst movies of all time", stating that its plot "strains credulity", while Jon O'Brien of Inverse called it "one of the worst movies ever made" and wrote that it "has nothing to offer but unconvincing pratfalls...tumbleweed one-liners...and some unashamed sexism, too". It was described as "almost unwatchably awful" and "a baffling piece of work" by Charles Bramesco of Uproxx, who wrote that it was a "perennial contender in the battle for the title of Worst Movie Ever". The A.V. Club's Nathan Rabin wrote, "Critics and audiences alike found the Bio-Dome to be an abomination unto the Lord, an affront to the gods of cinema, and also a very bad movie, bad enough to be considered the gold standard of crapitude in Shore's oeuvre", noting that it had the lowest Metacritic score of any movie, with 1 out of 100. Bio-Dome was named one of the worst movies of the 1990s in a poll conducted by RiffTrax.

Kylie Minogue, who starred in the film as oceanographer Petra von Kant, called appearing in the film the worst decision of her career. For his performance in the movie, Shore won the Golden Raspberry Award for Worst Actor at the 17th Golden Raspberry Awards, tying with Tom Arnold for his performance in Big Bully.

=== Batman & Robin (1997) ===
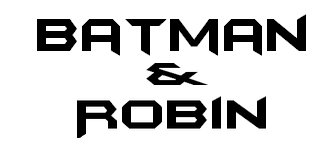
The comic book superhero sequel Batman & Robin (1997) was named the worst movie ever made by Empire.

Batman & Robin is a superhero film based on the DC Comics character Batman, the sequel to the 1995 film Batman Forever, and the fourth and final installment of Warner Bros.' initial Batman film series. It was directed by Joel Schumacher and stars George Clooney as Bruce Wayne / Batman, Arnold Schwarzenegger as Mr. Freeze, Uma Thurman as Poison Ivy, Chris O'Donnell as Dick Grayson / Robin, Alicia Silverstone as Barbara Wilson / Batgirl, and Michael Gough as Alfred Pennyworth. The film was largely criticized for its toyetic and camp approach, and Mr. Freeze's approach and one-line jokes.

As of June 2017, review aggregator Rotten Tomatoes reports that 11% of critics have given the film a positive review based on 89 reviews, certifying it "Rotten" with an average rating of 3.7/10, and the critics' consensus: "Joel Schumacher's tongue-in-cheek attitude hits an unbearable limit in Batman & Robin, resulting in a frantic and mindless movie that's too jokey to care much for." By comparison Metacritic collected an average score of 28/100, based on 21 reviews. Michael J. Nelson, of Mystery Science Theater 3000 fame, wrote of the movie in his book, Movie Megacheese, "Batman & Robin is not the worst movie ever. No, indeed. It's the worst thing ever. Yes, it's the single worst thing that we as human beings have ever produced in recorded history." Batman & Robin also came in first in an Empire poll of the 50 worst films ever. Joel Schumacher apologized to disappointed fans on the 2005 DVD release of Batman & Robin. In 2021, Clooney stated that he refused to let his wife, Amal, watch the film, saying, "There are certain films I just go, 'I want my wife to have some respect for me'". Clooney later made a cameo appearance as Bruce Wayne in the DC Extended Universe film The Flash (2023).

=== Le Jour et la Nuit (The Day and the Night) (1997) ===
The French romance film Le Jour et la Nuit was directed by philosopher Bernard-Henri Lévy. It follows a French author who fled to Mexico for a quiet life and an actress who is willing to seduce him to get a part in a film adapted from one of his books. Before its release, Le Jour et la Nuit was heavily promoted in many French newspapers and magazines. When the film premiered at the Berlin International Film Festival in 1997, hundreds of journalists walked out of the screening and those that stayed ridiculed it. Following its release, Le Jour et la Nuit was harshly criticized by the French media, with overwhelmingly negative reviews appearing in publications such as Libération, Le Monde and Le Nouvel Observateur. The film also did poorly commercially, with only 73,147 seats for Le Jour et la Nuit having been sold two months after its release. L'Humanité called it an "Absolute debacle" and Michel Houellebecq referred to it as the "most preposterous film in history". Le Jour et la Nuit was considered the worst French film since 1945 by film magazine Cahiers du cinéma, and its status as the "worst film in history" was discussed by the French version of Slate. Likewise, English-language film site /Film described its status as "one of the worst foreign language movies ever made", and filmmaker Claude Chabrol selected it as one of the worst movies ever made. An original documentary, Anatomy of a Massacre, was released with the Le Jour et la Nuit DVD, and focused on its intense negative reception and failure.

=== The Avengers (1998) ===
An adaptation of the popular 1960s British TV series of the same name, The Avengers starred Ralph Fiennes as John Steed and Uma Thurman as Emma Peel, with Sean Connery as their antagonist, Sir August de Wynter. It was directed by Jeremiah S. Chechik. The Avengers began to receive negative publicity after Warner Bros., the film's distributor, refused to allow any early press-screenings for movie reviewers. After early test screenings, The Avengers was heavily edited by the studio. On its release, The Avengers was savaged by film critics, with the Birmingham Post stating "The Avengers is being slated by critics as the worst film ever made" and adding that one reviewer had joked the film was such a "turkey" that the makers should have handed distribution to the poultry chain Bernard Matthews. Several reviewers disparaged The Avengers for lacking the wit and excitement of its source material. Janet Maslin strongly criticized The Avengers: "With pseudo-suave repartee that would make Austin Powers blush and with so many shades of Howard the Duck that one scene depicts man-size pastel teddy bears sitting around a conference table, it's a film to gall fans of the old TV series and perplex anyone else. I can't remember another Friday morning show where I heard actual cries of "Ugh!" on the way out the door" and finished her review with, "At a pared-down, barely rational 100 minutes, The Avengers is short but not short enough."

David Bianculli said, "This Avengers film is so horrendously, painfully and thoroughly awful, it gives other cinematic clunkers like Ishtar and Howard the Duck a good name." Alan Jones in The Radio Times stated "The cult 1960s TV series gets royally shafted by Hollywood in this stunningly designed blockbuster that's stunningly awful in every other department ... Terrible special effects and zero chemistry between Fiennes and Thurman make this notorious disaster a total waste of everyone's time and energy." The Avengers also shared a Razzie Award for "Worst Remake or Sequel" with the 1998 adaptations of Psycho and Godzilla at the 19th Golden Raspberry Awards. Total Film magazine later voted Fiennes and Thurman in The Avengers as "The Worst Movie Double Act Of All Time". The film also appeared on Metacritic's list of the all-time lowest-scoring films.

=== Fatal Deviation (1998) ===
Fatal Deviation is often credited as being the first martial arts film to be filmed in Ireland. It stars martial artist James Bennett and Michael Graham, who is best known for being a member of the boy band Boyzone. The Irish Post and Den of Geek write that it is a mainstay of worst film lists. Luke McKinney of Cracked.com called it the worst film ever made, writing: "There are so many things about making a movie that Jimmy doesn't know, that you could replace film school with this movie alone—just screening it once for students and asking them to list all the things it did wrong. Anyone who doesn't write 'everything' instantly fails." The Irish Post named it the worst Irish film of all time, the Irish Independent wrote that it is "regarded as one of the worst films ever made" and Comic Book Resources called it "one of the worst commercial movies ever made". Entertainment.ie placed it on its list of "10 So Bad They're Good Movies You Need To See Before You Die" and it was covered in Paste's Bad Movie Diaries column.

=== Parting Shots (1999) ===
The British black comedy Parting Shots was the last film directed by Michael Winner. It starred rock musician Chris Rea as a man who, after being told he has only six months to live, begins murdering people who have wronged him. Andrew Collins took a very negative view of the film: "Parting Shots ... is going to set the course of British film-making back 20 years. It is not only the worst British film produced in this country since Carry On Emmannuelle (quite a feat in itself), it is a thoroughbred contender for the crown of Worst Film Ever Made." In an interview about the film, Charlotte O'Sullivan, the Independent's film editor, claimed Parting Shots was "the worst film I've ever seen". O'Sullivan also criticized it for glorifying vigilantism: "It's Michael Winner and you know, he doesn't have any sense of irony. He seems to be saying it is okay to go and kill people." The journalist Miles Kington later claimed "Parting Shots ... was directed by Michael Winner and despite the glittering cast, was possibly the worst film ever made." I. Q. Hunter listed Parting Shots as one of the candidates for "the Worst British film ever made". Parting Shots was also featured in a poll of Empire magazine readers' "50 Worst Movies Ever" poll.

=== The Underground Comedy Movie (1999) ===
The Underground Comedy Movie is based on a cable access show from 1988. Director and lead actor Vince Offer constructed the film out of a series of tasteless, lowbrow skits (including Gena Lee Nolin loudly using the restroom and a superhero named Dickman who dresses in a giant penis costume and defeats his enemies by squirting them with semen). In 1999, Offer filed a suit against 20th Century Fox and the co-directors of There's Something About Mary (1998), Bobby and Peter Farrelly, claiming that 14 scenes in Mary were stolen from his film. The Farrellys released this statement: "We've never heard of him, we've never heard of his movie, and it's all a bunch of baloney." Lawrence Van Gelder of The New York Times referred to it as a "wretched film" and stated that "The Underground Comedy Movie stands as a monument to ineptitude and self-delusion." Rod Dreher of the New York Post said it "may be the least amusing comedy ever made". Dave Shulman of L.A. Weekly described it as a "serious contender for the single worst movie ever made", while Stinkers Bad Movie Awards co-founder Mike Lancaster said that it was the worst film that he had ever paid to see. Nathan Rabin covered the film in his column detailing terrible films and stated that: "nothing I've covered for this column was quite as soul-crushingly, brain-meltingly terrible as ... The Underground Comedy Movie'. Thom Bennett at Film Journal International, wrote "Anyone offended by unbearably bad films, jokes that are not funny and wasting 90 minutes of their lives is, as promised, guaranteed to be offended. In fact, to even call this mess a comedy is giving it far too much credit", and "The Underground Comedy Movie may well be the worst film I have ever seen." Writing in Central Western Daily, Peter Young said, "I am pretty sure that I can declare this The Worst Film I Have Ever Seen."

== 2000 ==
=== Battlefield Earth (2000) ===
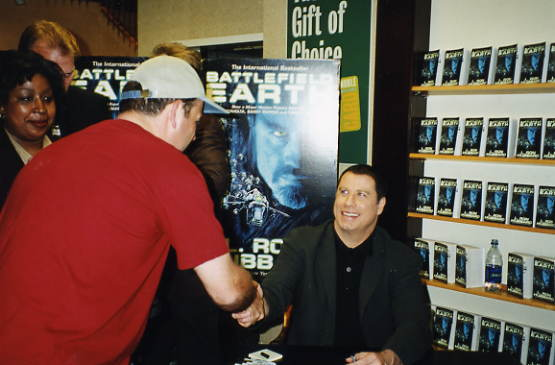
John Travolta during Battlefield Earth's promotional tour

Battlefield Earth is based on the first half of L. Ron Hubbard's 1982 novel of the same name, and stars John Travolta, Barry Pepper and Forest Whitaker. It was criticized for its script, acting, overuse of Dutch angles, dialogue, several inconsistencies, and plot holes. The film has a 3% rating at Rotten Tomatoes, where it is included in the top 100 worst-reviewed movies of all time. Roger Ebert predicted that the film, "for decades to come will be the punch line of jokes about bad movies", and placed it on his "most hated" list. Nathan Rabin covered the film as part of his My World of Flops column for The A.V. Club, calling it "a fiasco that occupies a distinguished place high atop the pantheon of widely reviled crap" and said, "A legendary disaster well before it finished completion, Battlefield Earth hit theaters with a 'Kick Me' sign on it so massive it could be detected from outer space."

The film ultimately won nine Golden Raspberry Awards, including Worst Picture, Worst Screen Couple (John Travolta and "anyone on the screen with him"), and a special award in 2010 as the Worst Picture of the Decade. This was the most Razzies won by any film in the history of the awards at the time, a record it held until Jack and Jill surpassed it with 10 wins in 2012. Listing the film as one of the worst decisions in movie history, Rolling Stone quipped that, "If Earth sticks around long enough for the Golden Raspberry Awards to hand out a 'worst movie of the century' at their 2100 ceremony, it'll probably win that, too." The movie appeared on Metacritic's list of the all-time lowest-scoring films, and is on the Movie Review Query Engine's (MRQE) 50 Worst Movies list, as well as worst film lists from Screen Rant, Vanity Fair, Flavorwire, Digital Trends and the New York Daily News. Empire named it the second worst movie ever made after Batman & Robin and The Register listed it as the worst movie ever made. Pepper and Whitaker both expressed regret for their involvement in Battlefield Earth, while film screenwriter J. David Shapiro later apologized for making "the suckiest movie ever".

=== Titanic: The Legend Goes On (2000) ===
Titanic: The Legend Goes On (also known as Titanic, mille e una storia, Titanic: La leggenda continua and Titanic: The Animated Movie) is an Italian animated mockbuster about the sinking of the RMS Titanic. It features a similar romantic storyline to James Cameron's 1997 film, but also has a number of talking animals (most notably, a rapping dog). Reviews condemned the quality of the animation and criticized the plot for being insensitive to the memory of the victims of the Titanic.

Total Film named Titanic: The Legend Goes On as "officially the worst film ever made", after it topped a list of the 66 worst films ever. An article from Collider also described it as one of the worst films ever made, but notes that it "[lacks] the cult following that other bad films often acquire", stating: "Titanic: The Legend Goes On is too heinous for such fond pleasures." Critic Tim Brayton said that "It is one of the most surreally bad films I have ever encountered", adding: "For sheer mesmerising grotesqueness, there's almost nothing I can name that beats it, and no fan of bad movies can say that their life is complete till they've been exposed to it." Total Film also included the film on a list of the worst kids' movies, describing it as being "widely considered one of the worst animated films ever made", while Spanish film magazine Fotogramas selected it as one of the 20 worst films ever made. Screen Rant included it on a list of the 12 worst animated films of all time, and it topped a Showbiz Cheat Sheet list of the top 10 worst animated films ever, with author Will Roberts commenting that "[any] list of the worst animated films of all time begins with ... Titanic: The Legend Goes On". In 2012, Titanic: The Legend Goes On became the lowest-rated film on IMDb's Bottom 100 list.

== See also ==
- List of 21st-century films considered the worst
- List of biggest box-office bombs
- List of films voted the best
- List of films with a 0% rating on Rotten Tomatoes
- Hatewatching
- Low culture
- Z movie
