= Nathan Rabin =

American film and music critic (born 1976)

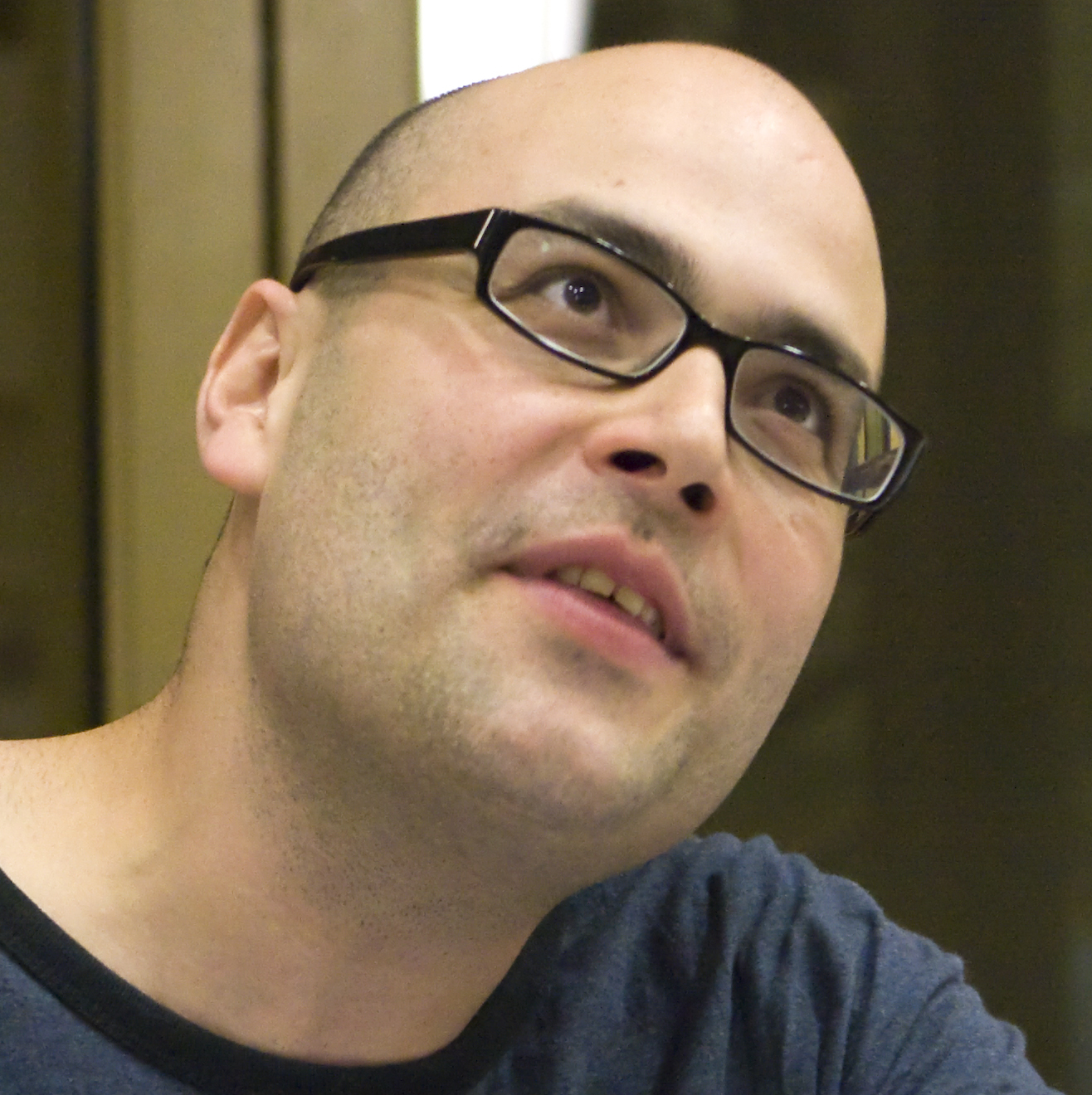
- Rabin in 2009
- Born: United States
- Education: University of Wisconsin–Madison
- Occupations: Writer; film critic; music critic
- Spouse: Danya Maloon
- Children: 2

Nathan Rabin (/rɑːˈbiːn/) is an American writer, humorist film and pop culture critic best known for his work on film, television, music and comedy. Rabin was the first head writer for The A.V. Club, a position he held until he left the Onion organization in 2013. In 2013, Rabin became a staff writer for The Dissolve, a film website operated by Pitchfork Media. Two of his featured columns at The Dissolve were "Forgotbusters" (looking back at films that were among the top 25 box office earners in their release years but had not had cultural or popular endurance) and "Streaming University" (reviewing documentaries that were available through sites such as Netflix and Hulu).

On April 29, 2015, Rabin announced he had parted ways with The Dissolve. He later returned to The A.V. Club as a freelance writer.

In April 2017, Rabin announced that The AV Club had canceled his My World of Flops column, and that he was establishing his own Patreon-funded website, Nathan Rabin's Happy Place.

== Early life and education ==
Rabin grew up on the north side of Chicago.

== Career ==
He coined the phrase "manic pixie dream girl" as a cinematic archetype in 2007. He was a panelist on the short-lived basic cable show Movie Club with John Ridley on American Movie Classics. In 2007, he began My Year of Flops on The A.V. Club, where he reevaluated films that were shunned by critics, ignored by audiences, or both, at their time of release. As of January 2008, the year was finished, but he continued the project as a bimonthly feature. Other ongoing features Rabin wrote for The A.V. Club include Dispatches From Direct-To-DVD Purgatory, a tongue-in-cheek look at DVD premieres; reviews for TV shows like Louie; Silly Little Show-Biz Book Club, a humorous exploration of trashy books about entertainment, and Ephemereview, which offers critiques of sub-reviewable pop-culture detritus.

Rabin released his memoir in 2009, The Big Rewind: A Memoir Brought To You By Pop Culture, (2009) which was published by Scribner. The Washington Post gave the book a negative review, calling it a "...failed project brought to you by pop culture." while The New York Times wrote, "[Rabin] has packed [The Big Rewind] like a cannon, full of caustic wit and bruised feelings" in its more positive review. The book uses novels such as The Great Gatsby, musical recordings such as The Charm of the Highway Strip by The Magnetic Fields and other pop culture items as a springboard to discuss its author's tragi-comic adolescence as a guest of a mental hospital, a foster family whose patience and generosity he jokes "knew only strict, unyielding boundaries" and the Jewish Children's Bureau group home system, as well as his career with The A.V. Club and the short-lived film review show Movie Club With John Ridley on which he appeared. The book ends with a chapter about Rabin's unsuccessful audition to fill in for Roger Ebert as a guest critic on At the Movies. Scribner also published a book version of My Year of Flops (2010).

On April 23, 2013, The A.V. Club announced that Rabin, Tasha Robinson, Genevieve Koski, and Noel Murray would be leaving to start a new web-based project with former staffers Scott Tobias and Keith Phipps. On May 30, 2013, this project was revealed to be The Dissolve. In addition to criticism for The Dissolve, Rabin also wrote the biweekly feature Forgotbusters, a reexamination of now-culturally obscure Hollywood films whose box office grosses were among the top 25 of any film released in their year.

He has also written books on the Insane Clown Posse, Phish, and "Weird Al" Yankovic.

== Personal life ==
Rabin is Jewish. He is married to Atlanta native Danya Maloon; they have two sons together. He lives in Marietta, Georgia with his family.

In a 2009 AV Club article about the 1996 baseball comedy film Ed, Rabin described himself as "a longtime Chicago White Sox super-fan", although in a 2021 blog post he confessed to having lost interest in following sports since his adolescence. In 2024, he announced that he had recently been diagnosed with autism, moderate ADHD and bipolar II disorder.

== Books ==
- Thompson, Stephen; A.V. Club Staff (December 10, 2002). The Tenacity of the Cockroach: Conversations With Entertainment's Most Enduring Outsiders. Three Rivers Press. ISBN 978-0609809914.
- Rabin, Nathan (2009). The Big Rewind: A Memoir Brought to You by Pop Culture. Scribner. ISBN 978-1416556206.
- A.V. Club Staff (October 13, 2009). Inventory: 16 Films Featuring Manic Pixie Dream Girls, 10 Great Songs Nearly Ruined by Saxophone, and 100 More Obsessively Specific Pop-Culture Lists. Scribner. ISBN 978-1416594734.
- Rabin, Nathan (October 19, 2010). My Year of Flops: The A.V. Presents One Man's Journey Deep Into the Heart of Cinematic Failure. New York: Scribner. ISBN 978-1439153123.
- Rabin, Nathan; Yankovic, Al (October 1, 2012). Weird Al: The Book. Abrams Books. ISBN 978-1419704352.
- Rabin, Nathan (2013). You Don't Know Me but You Don't Like Me: Phish, Insane Clown Posse, and My Misadventures with Two of Music's Most Maligned Tribes. Scribner. ISBN 978-1451626889.
- Rabin, Nathan (2020). The Weird Accordion to Al: Every "Weird Al" Yankovic Album Obsessively Analyzed by the Co-Author of Weird Al: The Book. Declan-Haven Publishing. ISBN 978-1658788472.
- Rabin, Nathan (December 16, 2021). The Joy of Trash: Nathan Rabin's Happy Place's Definitive Guide to the Very Worst of Everything. Declan-Haven Publishing. ISBN 978-1419732478.
