= My Year of Flops =

2010 book by Nathan Rabin

First edition (publ. Scribner's)

My Year of Flops (subtitled The A.V. Club Presents One Man's Journey Deep Into the Heart of Cinematic Failure) is a 2010 book by film critic Nathan Rabin based on his columns on the website The A.V. Club.

== Background ==
Starting in 2007, Rabin set out to provide a revisionist look at critical and commercial cinematic failures at a weekly basis.

== Criteria ==
Rabin's critique for each film fall into three categories: Failure, Fiasco, and Secret Success.

== List of films discussed in the book (in order of appearance) ==
- Elizabethtown (2005) (the first "case file", in which he coined the term "Manic Pixie Dream Girl")
- The Conqueror (1956)
- The End of Violence (1997)
- W. (2008)
- The Great Moment (1944)
- Gospel Road: A Story of Jesus (1973)
- O.C. and Stiggs (1987)
- Scenes from a Mall (1991)
- The Cable Guy (1996)
- Freddy Got Fingered (2001)
- Skidoo (1968)
- Breakfast of Champions (1999)
- Dice Rules (1991)
- The Adventures of Ford Fairlane (1990)
- Postal (2007)
- The Love Guru (2008)
- Sgt. Pepper's Lonely Hearts Club Band (1978)
- Pennies from Heaven (1981)
- The Apple (1980)
- Glitter (2001)
- Rent (2005)
- Under the Cherry Moon (1986)
- I'll Do Anything (1994)
- Mame (1974)
- It's All About Love (2003)
- The Island of Dr. Moreau (1996)
- Southland Tales (2007)
- Hulk (2003)
- Last Action Hero (1993)
- The Rocketeer (1991)
- The Real Cancun (2003)
- The Scarlet Letter (1995)
- Body of Evidence (1993)
- Exit to Eden (1994)
- Tough Guys Don't Dance (1987)
- Even Cowgirls Get the Blues (1993)
- Lolita (1997)
- Pinocchio (2002)
- Santa Claus: The Movie (1985)
- Bratz: The Movie (2007)
- Ishtar (1987)
- Paint Your Wagon (1969)
- Gigli (2003)
- Cruising (1980)
- Battlefield Earth (2000)
- Heaven's Gate (1980)
- Howard the Duck (1986)
- Psycho (1998)
- Cleopatra (1963)
- Joe Versus the Volcano (1990)
- Waterworld (1995)

== Aftermath ==
In 2011, Rabin expanded the scope of the My Year of Flops column into a successor feature, My World of Flops, to include TV shows, books, and musical albums. He began with Aaron Sorkin's 2006 TV series Studio 60 on the Sunset Strip and ended with the 2016 comedy film Grimsby before opening his own personal site called "Nathan Rabin's Happy Place".

== See also ==
- List of films considered the worst
- Cult film
- Mystery Science Theater 3000 — similar in content
- Cinephilia
- The Onion
