= ArticlesBase =

- Company type: Private
- Available in: English
- Founded: 2005
- Key people: Eyal Halimi and Simon Gelfand
- Industry: Internet
- Employees: 12
- Website: ArticlesBase.com
- Current status: Closed

ArticlesBase was an article syndication website based in Ramat Gan, Israel.

== Overview ==
ArticlesBase was an online directory of syndicated articles on 26 core topics, including health, finance, business, home improvement and education. Authors were invited to publish articles for free and to share knowledge with potential customers. The article database was organized into an article directory that covered a wide variety of subjects. It also offered a global library of over 3 million articles in six languages (English, Portuguese, Russian, Spanish, French and Hebrew). According to the company, 500,000 contributors added thousands of new articles daily, for which they received no monetary compensation.

ArticlesBase contributors copying and pasting from other websites and CD-ROMs was common, which constituted copyright infringement.

== History ==
ArticlesBase was established by Eyal Halimi and Simon Gelfand in 2005 as a website providing a free platform for content producers to publish their work online (also known as article marketing). ArticlesBase offered international versions of the site for Spanish, Portuguese, Chinese, Russian, French and Hebrew readers. There were eventually over 3,000,000 articles published by 300,000 authors on the English site alone.

== Analytics tools ==
Web analytics tools allowed users to track visitor traffic and help determine the effectiveness of their article across several objectives. The tool can help authors improve the performance of future submissions and analyzing the past behaviors of their articles by tracking visitor traffic. Parameters include a graph showing the number of visits over different time frames, the keywords their readers used to find their articles (shown by number and total percentage), and the referrer through which their readers arrive at ArticlesBase.
