= Legal protection of access to abortion =

Several countries have implemented laws which are designed to afford legal protection of access to abortion. Such legislation often seeks to guard facilities which provide induced abortion against obstruction, vandalism, picketing, and other actions, or to protect patients and employees of such facilities from threats and harassment (see sidewalk interference).

Another way of safeguarding access to healthcare is through the creation of a perimeter around an abortion facility, known variously as a "safe access zone", "access zone", "buffer zone" or "bubble zone". These areas are intended to limit how close to these facilities demonstration by those who oppose abortion can approach. Protests and other displays are restricted to a certain distance from the building, which varies depending upon the law, or are prohibited altogether. Similar zones have also been created to protect the homes of abortion providers and clinic staff.

Bubble zone laws are divided into "fixed" and "floating" categories. Fixed bubble zone laws apply to the static area around the facility itself, and floating laws to objects in transit, such as people or cars.

== Laws in Australia ==
Several "buffer zone" laws have been enacted within Australia. All states and territories have passed laws intended to protect medical facilities that provide induced abortion:

- Tasmania: Tasmania was the first state or territory to enforce buffer zones. In 2013, the Tasmanian Parliament passed the Reproductive Health (Access to Terminations) Act 2013 which enforces 'access zones' of a radius of 150 metres from premises at which abortions are provided. Behaviour prohibited within access zones includes: besetting, harassing, intimidating, interfering with, threatening, hindering, obstructing or impeding a person; protests in relation to terminations that are able to be seen or heard by a person accessing a clinic; footpath interference; and intentionally recording a person accessing a clinic without their consent. The laws, in particular, the recent regulations passed by the NSW parliament in June 2018, were opposed by "sidewalk counsellors" who are "known to stand outside clinics with the intention of changing the minds of women entering the clinics".
- Victoria: In November 2015, Victoria became the second state to pass legislation, the Public Health and Wellbeing Amendment (Safe Access Zones) Act 2015, to limit protests outside abortion clinics and 150 metre buffer zones are now enforced. Prior to this, in 2005, the Australian Democrats proposed a law to create buffer zones around clinics in Victoria. However, these attempts were unsuccessful as buffer zones were not included in Victoria's Public Health and Wellbeing Act 2008.
- South Australia: 150-metre fixed buffer zone under the Health Care (Safe Access) Amendment Act 2020.
- Australian Capital Territory 50-metre fixed buffer zones around abortion facilities under the Health Act 1993 as amended by the Health (Patient Privacy) Amendment Act 2015.
- New South Wales 150-metre exclusion zone around clinics under the Public Health Amendment (Safe Access to Reproductive Health Clinics) Act 2018.
- Western Australia: 150-metre fixed buffer zones around abortion facilities at all times under the Public Health Amendment (Safe Access Zones) Act 2021.
- Northern Territory: 150-metre fixed buffer zones around abortion clinics under the Termination of Pregnancy Law Reform Act 2017.
- Queensland: 150-metre fixed buffer zone around abortion clinics under the Termination of Pregnancy Act 2018.

== Laws in Canada ==
Several "buffer zone" laws have been enacted within Canada. At least three of the country's provinces and territories have passed laws intended to protect medical facilities that provide induced abortion:

- Alberta: 50-metre fixed buffer zone around abortion clinics under the Protecting Choice for Women Accessing Health Care Act. Under the act, doctors and other service providers are able to apply for buffer zones of 160 metres around their homes and a buffer zone of up to 20 metres around their offices.
- British Columbia: 10-metre fixed buffer zone around a doctor's office, 50-metre fixed buffer zone around a hospital or clinic, and 160-metre fixed buffer zone around an abortion provider or clinic worker's home. The Access to Abortion Services Act, enacted in 1995, refers to this area as an "access zone". It prohibits protesting, sidewalk counseling, intimidation of or physical interference with abortion providers or their patients inside of this space. The provisions against protesting and sidewalk counselling were repealed on January 23, 1996, as violating the Charter of Rights and Freedoms, but were both restored in October of the same year.
- Ontario: 50-metre fixed buffer zone around clinics that perform abortions; variable buffer zones of up to 150 metres granted upon application to hospitals, pharmacies and other health facilities. The Safe Access to Abortion Services Act, 2017 prohibits protesting, sidewalk counseling, intimidation, physical interference, and recording or photographing patients and employees within buffer zones.
- Quebec: 50-metre fixed buffer zone around any clinic, hospital or drugstore that perform abortions. It prohibits interfering with the operations of the abortion provider, sidewalk counselling and intimidation under Bill 92 in 2016.
- Manitoba: 50-metre to 150-metre buffer zones around abortion clinics under the Safe Access to Abortion Services Act.
- Newfoundland and Labrador: 50-metre fixed buffer zones under the Access to Abortion Services Act.
- Nova Scotia: 50-metre buffer zones around healthcare facilities under the Protecting Access to Reproductive Health Care Act.

Access zone legislation has also been passed at the level of local government in Canada:

- Calgary, Alberta: fixed buffer zone which requires protesters to remain across the street from a clinic in Kensington. Established in 1991, the injunction also limits the number of anti-abortion demonstrators who carry signs, or pray. It was first challenged by Michael O'Malley of Campaign Life Coalition in 1997, and again in 2000, but a judge upheld it both times.
- Toronto, Ontario: 500-feet fixed buffer zone around doctors' homes, 25 feet (7.6 m) fixed buffer zone around doctors' offices, 60 feet (18 m) fixed buffer zone around two clinics in the Cabbagetown and Scott districts, 30 feet (9.1 m) fixed buffer zone around another clinic, and 10-foot (3.0 m) floating buffer zone around patients and staff. The injunction was granted on August 30, 1994.

== Law in Ireland ==
In Ireland, the Health (Termination of Pregnancy Services) (Safe Access Zones) Act 2024 means there a safe access zone with a radius of 100 metres may be created around a general practitioner, obstetrician, or a hospital providing abortion services. The law commenced on 17 October 2024.

== Law in New Zealand ==
In New Zealand, the Contraception, Sterilisation, and Abortion (Safe Areas) Amendment Act 2022 means a safe access zone may be created around an abortion facility. Within the safe zone, protestors may not obstruct access or make a visual recording of another person.

== Law in South Africa ==
In South Africa, the Choice on Termination of Pregnancy Act, 1996 prohibits anyone from "preventing the lawful termination of a pregnancy" or "obstructing access to a facility for the termination of a pregnancy", imposing a penalty of up to ten years' imprisonment.

== Laws in the United Kingdom ==
Legislation regarding safe access zones for abortion clinics varies considerably by jurisdiction.

- England and Wales – the Public Order Act 2023 includes a section that establishes safe access zones of 150 metres.
- Scotland – the Abortion Services (Safe Access Zones) (Scotland) Act 2024 establishes safe access zones with a radius of 200 metres
- Northern Ireland – the Abortion Services (Safe Access Zones) Act (Northern Ireland) 2023 establishes safe access zones with a radius of 100 metres, and this legislation was commenced on 7 February 2023.

=== Crown Dependencies ===
In the Isle of Man, the Abortion Reform Act 2019 establishes an access zone of 100 metres around Noble's Hospital and other hospitals in the Isle of Man.

== Laws in the United States ==
At the federal level in the United States, the Freedom of Access to Clinic Entrances Act (FACE), makes it an offense to use intimidation or physical force – such as forming a blockade – in order to prevent a person from entering a facility which provides reproductive healthcare or a place of worship. The law also creates specific penalties for destroying, or causing damage to, either of these types of building.

California, New York, and Washington have each established their own version of FACE. Other states have instituted several different kinds of measures designed to protect clinics, their employees, and patients:

- 11 states make it illegal to obstruct the entrance to a clinic: California, Kansas, Maine, Maryland, Minnesota, Montana, Nevada, New York, North Carolina, Oregon and Washington.
- Six states prohibit making threats toward a clinic's staff or patients: California, Michigan, New York, North Carolina, Washington, and Wisconsin. Two states, Maine and Washington, also ban harassment by telephone.
- Four states ban property damage to a clinic: California, Oregon, New York, and Washington.
- One state, Maine, has enacted a noise regulation pertaining to activity outside of a clinic, and also made it an offense to intentionally release a substance with an unpleasant odor inside of it.
- One state, North Carolina, prohibits weapon possession during a demonstration outside of a clinic.

In the February 2003 case, Scheidler v. National Organization for Women, the Supreme Court of the United States ruled that anti-abortion activists could not be prosecuted under the Racketeer Influenced and Corrupt Organizations Act (RICO), a law drafted to counter organized crime, or the Hobbs Act, a law intended to address economic damages caused by extortion. The Court reaffirmed this holding on February 28, 2006 in a unanimous decision, although only eight Justices participated in the ruling, because Samuel Alito had not yet been confirmed.

=== "Buffer zone" laws ===
In the United States, three states have passed "buffer zone" legislation, which can create either a "fixed" area around a medical facility or a "floating" area around patients and staff:

- Colorado: 100-feet fixed and eight-feet floating. After being enacted in 1993, the "floating" provision was first challenged in 1995, when three anti-abortion activists suggested that it violated their right to freedom of speech. Although upheld in a trial court and by the state's appeals court, the Supreme Court of Colorado would not hear the case, so the petitioners took their case against Colorado's floating buffer law to the Supreme Court of the United States. In February 1997, considering its ruling against a floating buffer zone in the case Schenck v. Pro-Choice Network of Western New York, the Supreme Court requested that the appeals court of Colorado re-examine their state's law. It was upheld again, and in February 1999, the Supreme Court of Colorado agreed with the holdings of the lower court. In the 2000 case Hill v. Colorado, the "floating" provision was again appealed before the federal Supreme Court, where this time it was upheld, 6-3.
- Massachusetts: 35-feet fixed buffer zone enacted in 2007. Massachusetts Attorney General Martha Coakley’s Office defended the constitutionality of the statute in the federal court proceedings. In May 2007, Attorney General Coakley testified before the Legislature in support of the passage of the legislation. The buffer zone law was signed by Governor Deval Patrick and took effect on November 13, 2007. Attorney General Coakley successfully defended the statute before the U.S. Court of Appeals for the First Circuit, which affirmed the constitutionality of the Commonwealth's buffer zone law on July 8, 2009. The 2007 law changed the 2000 law, which provided for an 18-feet fixed buffer zone and six feet floating buffer zone. Enacted on November 10, 2000, this law was struck down by U.S. district judge Edward Harrington soon afterward because he felt there was an unacceptable discrepancy in the floating buffer zone being applied to anti-abortion protesters but exempted from clinic workers. The law was restored in August 2001 by a federal appeals court. This law was struck down by the U.S. Supreme Court on June 26, 2014.
- Montana: 36 feet (11 m) fixed buffer zone and eight feet floating buffer zone.

Several local governments in the United States have, at some time, also passed similar municipal ordinances:

- Buffalo and Rochester, New York: 15-feet fixed and 15 feet (4.6 m) floating around four clinics in two cities. The buffer zone resulted from an injunction issued by the U.S. district court in response to a federal lawsuit filed against 50 individuals and three anti-abortion organizations, including Operation Rescue, by three doctors and four clinics. The law was challenged in the 1997 case court case, Schenck v. Pro-Choice Network of Western New York, by anti-abortion activist Paul Schenck. The case came before the Supreme Court, where Justices, in considering Madsen v. Women’s Health Center, ruled 8–1 to uphold the constitutionality of the fixed buffer zone, but not that of a floating buffer zone.
- Melbourne, Florida: 36-feet fixed buffer zone around a clinic, 300 feet (91 m) floating buffer zone around patients, and 300 feet (91 m) buffer zone around the homes of the clinic's employees. The injunction also regulated noise levels outside of the clinic and prevented demonstrators from displaying images which could be seen from inside. It was upheld in full by the Supreme Court of Florida but came before the federal Supreme Court in Madsen v. Women’s Health Center in 1994. The Court upheld the fixed buffer zone, and the noise regulation around clinics and in residential areas, but rejected the floating buffer zone, residential buffer zone, and prohibition against displaying images.
- Pittsburgh, Pennsylvania: 15 feet-fixed buffer zone and eight feet floating buffer zone. The statute was approved by the Pittsburgh City Council in December 2005. In 2009, a three judge appeals court panel found in Brown v. Pittsburgh that while either a fixed buffer or a floating buffer alone is constitutional, this combination of buffers is "insufficiently narrowly tailored," and thus unconstitutional.
- West Palm Beach, Florida: 20-feet buffer zone and noise ordinance approved in September 2005. U.S. District Judge Donald Middlebrooks found the law to be an infringement of the right to free speech on April 11, 2006, and ordered that it be enjoined, but upheld the regulation against excessive noise.
- Chicago, Illinois: 8 foot-floating buffer zone within 50 feet of clinic entrance enacted in November 2009.

== Debate ==
Supporters of such laws claim that these zones are necessary to ensure that women have access to abortion. They argue that a buffer zone helps to prevent blockading of a clinic's entrance, to protect the safety of patients and staff, and to ensure that clients do not feel intimidated, distressed, or harassed by the presence of anti-abortion activists.

Some traditional free speech advocates such as the British Columbia Civil Liberties Association have cautiously sided in favour of narrowly defined "bubble zones" around abortion clinics on the basis that patients have a medical right to privacy when receiving confidential legal medical procedures that is compromised if protesters identify patients for the purpose of publicly shaming or intimidating them.

The American Civil Liberties Union helped enact the Freedom of Access to Clinic Entrances Act in 1994, which guarantees pedestrian access to clinics, but does not restrict related speech activity. In Schenck v. Pro-Choice Network of Western New York, the ACLU filed briefs defending the constitutionality of a court order that prohibited defendants from protesting within 15 feet of clinic driveways and entrances in western New York. The Supreme Court upheld the ACLU's position.

Some pro-choice activists have also argued that anyone convicted of anti-abortion violence should be permanently banned from protesting outside abortion clinics. Professor Jacob M. Appel of New York University has argued that "much as we do not permit convicted pedophiles to teach kindergarten or convicted hijackers to board airplanes, common sense dictates that individuals who have been imprisoned for plotting violence against abortion clinics should never again be permitted anywhere near such facilities.".

Those who oppose the creation of such legislation contend that "bubble zones", by limiting the ability to protest peacefully, represent an infringement upon their rights to freedom of expression and freedom of assembly.

== See also ==
- Abortion law
- Anti-abortion violence
- Conscience clause (medical)
- Minors and abortion
- Neonaticide
