= Amy Coney Barrett =

US Supreme Court justice since 2020

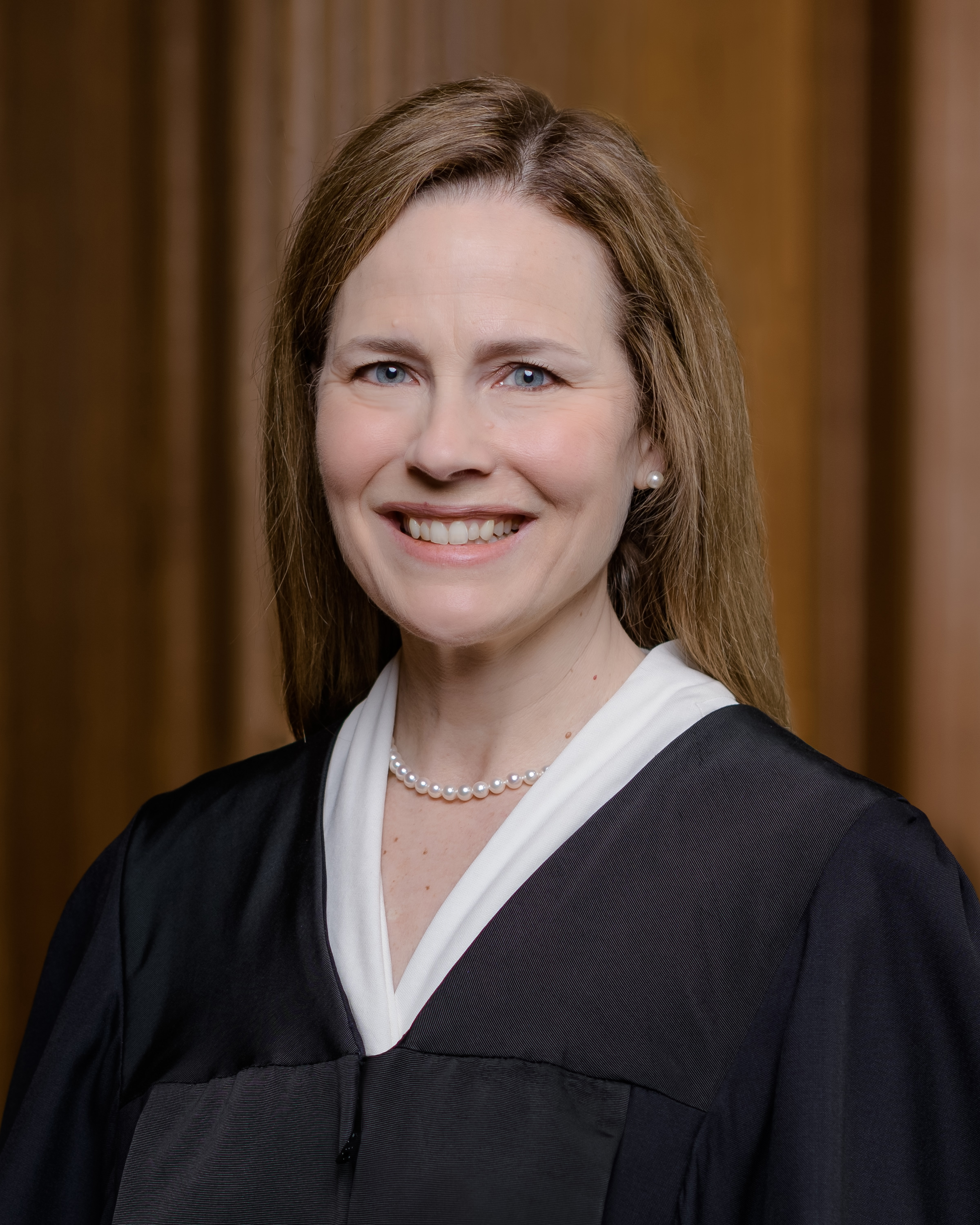
- Official portrait, 2021

Associate Justice of the Supreme Court of the United States
- Incumbent
- Assumed office October 27, 2020
- Appointed by: Donald Trump
- Preceded by: Ruth Bader Ginsburg

Judge of the United States Court of Appeals for the Seventh Circuit
- In office November 2, 2017 – October 26, 2020
- Appointed by: Donald Trump
- Preceded by: John Daniel Tinder
- Succeeded by: Thomas Kirsch

Personal details
- Born: Amy Vivian Coney; January 28, 1972 (age 54) New Orleans, Louisiana, U.S.
- Spouse: Jesse Barrett (m. 1999)
- Children: 7
- Education: Rhodes College (BA); University of Notre Dame (JD)
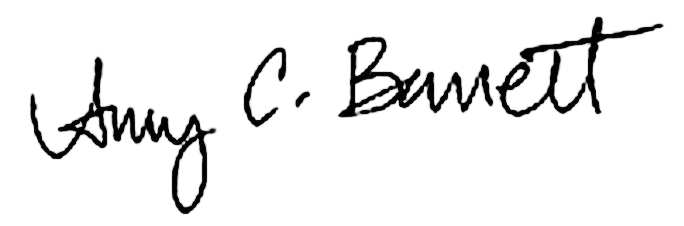
- Signature
- Barrett's voice Barrett delivering decision for Glacier Northwest v. International Brotherhood of Teamsters. Recorded June 1, 2023

Amy Vivian Coney Barrett (née Coney; born January 28, 1972) is an American lawyer and jurist serving since 2020 as an associate justice of the Supreme Court of the United States. The fifth woman to serve on the court, she was nominated by President Donald Trump. She was a United States circuit judge of the United States Court of Appeals for the Seventh Circuit from 2017 to 2020.

Barrett graduated from Rhodes College before attending Notre Dame Law School, earning a Juris Doctor (J.D.) degree in 1997 and ranked first in her class. She then clerked for Judge Laurence Silberman and Justice Antonin Scalia. In 2002, Barrett joined the faculty at Notre Dame Law School, becoming a professor in 2010. While a circuit judge, she continued to teach civil procedure, constitutional law, and statutory interpretation.

On September 26, 2020, shortly after United States Supreme Court justice Ruth Bader Ginsburg's death, Trump nominated Barrett to succeed her. Her nomination was controversial because the 2020 presidential election was only 38 days away and Senate Republicans had refused to hold hearings for Merrick Garland during an election year in 2016. The next month, the United States Senate voted 52–48 to confirm her nomination, with all Democrats and one Republican in opposition.

Described as a protégée of Justice Antonin Scalia, Barrett supports textualism in statutory interpretation and originalism in constitutional interpretation. While generally considered to be among the Court's conservative bloc, Barrett has demonstrated a growing pattern of independence and moderation as a swing vote in some controversial cases. Barrett has said she does not think of herself as a swing vote or a conservative, but as an originalist. She published her first book, Listening to the Law, in September 2025.

== Early life and education ==
Amy Vivian Coney was born in 1972 in New Orleans, Louisiana, to Linda (née Vath) and Michael Coney. The eldest of seven children, she has five sisters and a brother. Her father worked as an attorney for Shell Oil Company, and her mother was a high school French teacher and homemaker. Barrett has German, Irish, and French ancestry. Some of her maternal ancestors were from Ballyconnell, County Cavan, Ireland, while there is also Irish lineage among her father's ancestors, including Terence and Margaret McAdam, who moved from Ireland to New Orleans in the late 1800s. Other ancestors on her mother's side were French: her great-great-grandfather Firmin Daste emigrated from Bordeaux to New Orleans in 1859. Her family is devoutly Catholic, and her father is an ordained deacon at St. Catherine of Siena Parish in Metairie, Louisiana, where she grew up. Barrett attended St. Mary's Dominican High School, an all-girls Roman Catholic high school in New Orleans. She was student body vice president of the school and graduated in 1990.

After high school, Barrett attended Rhodes College in Memphis, Tennessee, where she majored in English literature and minored in French. She considers herself "somewhat fluent" in French, but with a Louisiana accent. She graduated in 1994 with a Bachelor of Arts, magna cum laude, and was inducted into Omicron Delta Kappa and Phi Beta Kappa. In her graduating class, she was named the most outstanding English department graduate. Barrett then attended Notre Dame Law School on a full-tuition scholarship. She was an executive editor of the Notre Dame Law Review and graduated in 1997 with a Juris Doctor, summa cum laude, ranked first in her class.

== Legal career ==
=== Clerkships and private practice ===
Barrett spent two years as a judicial law clerk after law school, first for Judge Laurence Silberman of the United States Court of Appeals for the District of Columbia Circuit from 1997 to 1998, and then for Justice Antonin Scalia of the United States Supreme Court from 1998 to 1999.

From 1999 to 2002, Barrett practiced law at Miller Cassidy Larroca & Lewin, a boutique law firm for litigation in Washington, D.C., that merged with the Houston, Texas-based law firm Baker Botts in 2001. While at Baker Botts, she worked on Bush v. Gore, the lawsuit that grew out of the 2000 United States presidential election, providing research and briefing assistance for the firm's representation of George W. Bush.

=== Teaching and scholarship ===
In 2001, Barrett was a visiting associate professor and John M. Olin Fellow in Law at George Washington University Law School. In 2002, she joined the faculty of her alma mater, Notre Dame Law School. At Notre Dame, she taught federal courts, evidence, constitutional law, and statutory interpretation. In 2007, she was a visiting professor at the University of Virginia School of Law. Barrett was named a professor of law at Notre Dame in 2010, and from 2014 to 2017 held Notre Dame's Diane and M.O. Miller II Research Chair of Law. Her scholarship focused on constitutional law, originalism, statutory interpretation, and stare decisis. Her academic work has been published in the Columbia, Cornell, Virginia, Notre Dame, and Texas law reviews.

At Notre Dame, Barrett received the "Distinguished Professor of the Year" award three times. From 2011 to 2016, she spoke on constitutional law at Blackstone Legal Fellowship, a summer program for law school students that the Alliance Defending Freedom established to inspire a "distinctly Christian worldview in every area of law". While serving on the Seventh Circuit, Barrett commuted between Chicago and South Bend, continuing to teach courses on statutory interpretation and constitutional theory.

In 2010, Chief Justice John Roberts appointed Barrett to serve on the Advisory Committee for the Federal Rules of Appellate Procedure.

== Seventh Circuit Court of Appeals (2017–2020) ==
=== Nomination and confirmation ===
On May 8, 2017, President Donald Trump nominated Barrett to the United States Court of Appeals for the Seventh Circuit—the federal appellate court covering Illinois, Indiana, and Wisconsin—after Judge John Daniel Tinder took senior status. A Senate Judiciary Committee hearing on her nomination was held on September 6, 2017. During the hearing, Senator Dianne Feinstein questioned Barrett about a law review article Barrett co-wrote in 1998 with Professor John H. Garvey in which they argued that Catholic judges should in some cases recuse themselves from death penalty cases due to their moral objections to the death penalty. Asked to "elaborate on the statements and discuss how you view the issue of faith versus fulfilling the responsibility as a judge today", Barrett said that she had participated in many death-penalty appeals while serving as law clerk to Scalia, adding, "My personal church affiliation or my religious belief would not bear on the discharge of my duties as a judge" and "It is never appropriate for a judge to impose that judge's personal convictions, whether they arise from faith or anywhere else, on the law." Barrett emphasized that the article was written in her third year in law school and that she was "very much the junior partner in our collaboration." Worried that Barrett would not uphold Roe v. Wade given her Catholic beliefs, Feinstein followed Barrett's response by saying, "the dogma lives loudly within you, and that is a concern."

The hearing made Barrett popular with religious conservatives. Feinstein's and other senators' questioning was criticized by some Republicans and other observers, such as university presidents John I. Jenkins of the University of Notre Dame and Christopher Eisgruber of Princeton, as an improper inquiry into a nominee's religious beliefs that employed an unconstitutional "religious test" for office; others, such as Nan Aron, defended Feinstein's line of questioning.

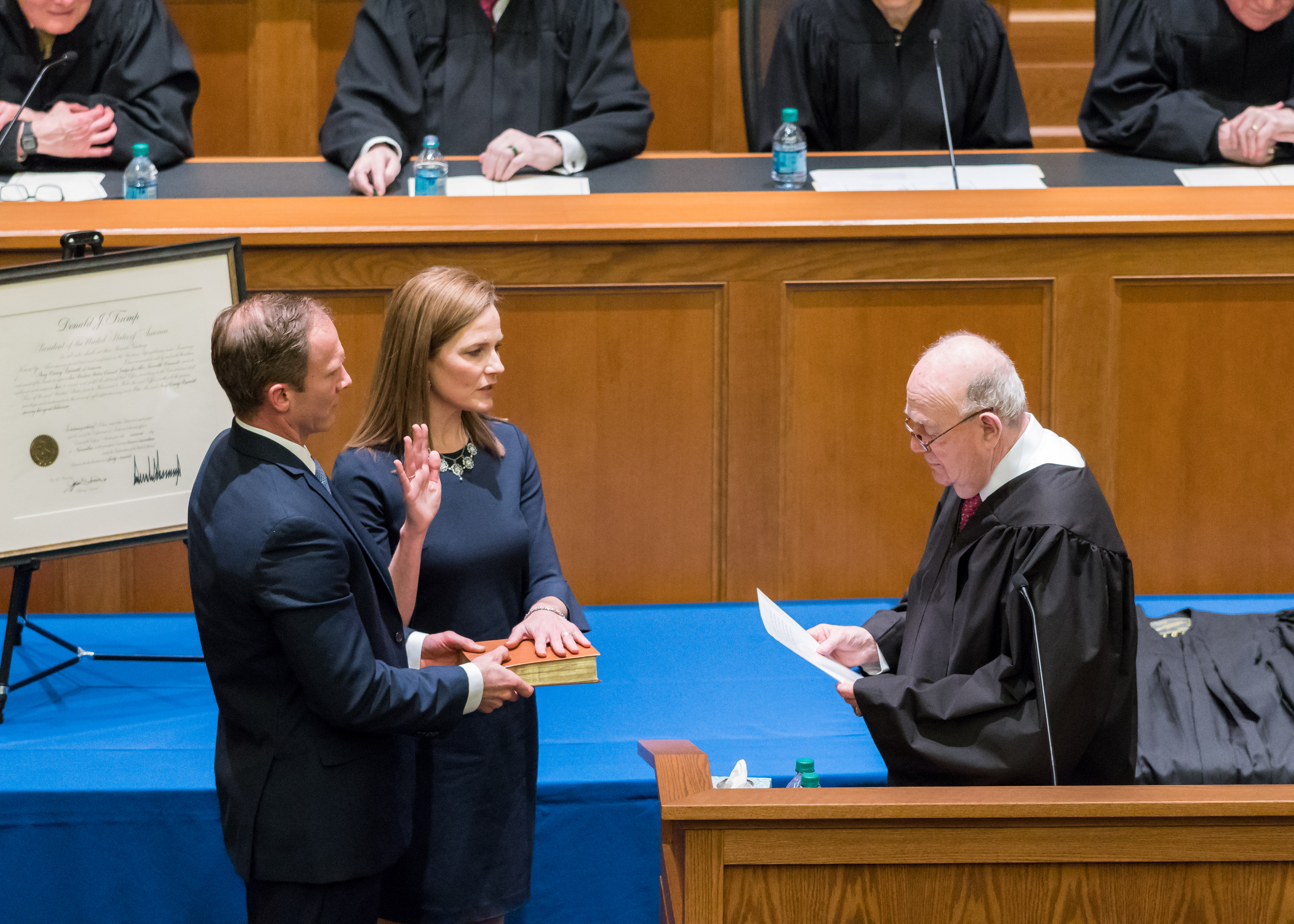
Judge Laurence Silberman, for whom Barrett first clerked after law school, swearing her in at her investiture for the Seventh Circuit in 2018

Lambda Legal, an LGBT civil rights organization, co-signed a letter with 26 other gay rights organizations opposing Barrett's nomination. The letter expressed doubts about her ability to separate faith from her rulings on LGBT matters. During her Senate hearing, Barrett was questioned about landmark LGBTQ legal precedents such as Obergefell v. Hodges, United States v. Windsor, and Lawrence v. Texas. She said these cases are "binding precedents" that she intended to "faithfully follow if confirmed" to the appeals court, as required by law. The letter Lambda Legal co-signed read, "Simply repeating that she would be bound by Supreme Court precedent does not illuminate—indeed, it obfuscates—how Professor Barrett would interpret and apply precedent when faced with the sorts of dilemmas that, in her view, 'put Catholic judges in a bind.'"

Barrett's nomination was supported by every law clerk she had worked with and all of her 49 faculty colleagues at Notre Dame Law school. 450 former students signed a letter to the Senate Judiciary Committee supporting her nomination.

On October 5, 2017, the Senate Judiciary Committee voted 11–9 on party lines to recommend Barrett and report her nomination to the full Senate. On October 30, the Senate invoked cloture by a vote of 54–42. It confirmed her by a vote of 55–43 on October 31, with three Democrats—Joe Donnelly, Tim Kaine, and Joe Manchin—voting for her. She received her commission two days later. Barrett is the first woman to occupy an Indiana seat on the Seventh Circuit.

=== Selected cases ===
Oral arguments from Cook County, Illinois v. Chad F. Wolf, one of the last cases that Barrett took in the Seventh Circuit Court of Appeals in 2020

On the Seventh Circuit, Barrett wrote 79 majority opinions (including two that were amended and one that was withdrawn on rehearing), four concurring opinions (one a per curiam opinion), and six dissenting opinions (six published and one in an unpublished order).

==== Title IX of the Education Amendments of 1972 ====
In June 2019, the court, in a unanimous decision written by Barrett, reinstated a suit brought by a male Purdue University student (John Doe) who had been found guilty of sexual assault by Purdue University, which resulted in a one-year suspension, loss of his Navy ROTC scholarship, and expulsion from the ROTC affecting his ability to pursue his chosen career in the Navy. Doe alleged the school's Advisory Committee on Equity discriminated against him on the basis of his sex and violated his rights to due process by not interviewing the alleged victim, not allowing him to present evidence in his defense, including an erroneous statement that he confessed to some of the alleged assault, and appearing to believe the victim instead of the accused without hearing from either party or having even read the investigation report. The court found that Doe had adequately alleged that the university deprived him of his occupational liberty without due process in violation of the Fourteenth Amendment and had violated his Title IX rights "by imposing a punishment infected by sex bias", and remanded to the District Court for further proceedings.

==== Employment discrimination ====
In 2017, the Seventh Circuit rejected the federal government's appeal in a civil lawsuit against AutoZone; the Equal Employment Opportunity Commission argued that AutoZone's assignment of employees to different stores based on race (e.g., "sending African American employees to stores in heavily African American neighborhoods") violated Title VII of the Civil Rights Act. Following this, Barrett joined the court as it received a petition for rehearing en banc. Three judges—Chief Judge Diane Wood and judges Ilana Rovner and David Hamilton—voted to grant rehearing, and criticized the three-judge panel's opinion as upholding a "separate-but-equal arrangement". Barrett did not join the panel opinion, but voted with four judges to deny the petition to rehear the case. The petition was unsuccessful by a 5–3 decision.

In 2019, Barrett wrote the unanimous three-judge panel opinion affirming summary judgment in the case of Smith v. Illinois Department of Transportation. Smith was a Black employee who claimed racial discrimination upon his dismissal by the department and that he was called a "stupid-ass nigger" by a Black supervisor; the department claimed Smith failed work-level expectations during probationary periods. Barrett wrote that usage of the racial slur was egregious, but Smith's testimony showed no evidence that his subjective experience of the workplace changed because of the slur, nor did it change the department's fact that his discharge was related to "poor performance".

==== Immigration ====
In June 2020, Barrett wrote a 40-page dissent when the majority upheld a preliminary injunction against the Trump administration's controversial "public charge rule", which heightened the standard for obtaining a green card. In her dissent, she argued that any noncitizens who disenrolled from government benefits because of the rule did so due to confusion about the rule itself rather than from its application, writing that the vast majority of the people subject to the rule are not eligible for government benefits in the first place. On the merits, Barrett departed from her colleagues Wood and Rovner, who held that DHS's interpretation of that provision was unreasonable under Chevron Step Two. Barrett would have held that the new rule fell within the broad scope of discretion granted to the Executive by Congress through the Immigration and Nationality Act. The public charge issue is the subject of a circuit split.

In May 2019, the court rejected a Yemeni citizen and her United States citizen husband's challenge to a consular officer's decision to twice deny her visa application under the Immigration and Nationality Act. The United States citizen argued that this had deprived him of a constitutional right to live in the United States with his spouse. In a 2–1 majority opinion authored by Barrett, the court held that the plaintiff's claim was properly dismissed under the doctrine of consular nonreviewability. Barrett declined to address whether the husband had been denied a constitutional right (or whether the constitutional right to live in the United States with his spouse existed at all) because the consular officer's decision to deny the visa application was facially legitimate and bona fide, and under Supreme Court precedent, in such a case courts will not "look behind the exercise of that discretion". The dispute concerned what it takes to satisfy this standard. A petition for rehearing en banc was denied, with Chief Judge Wood, joined by Rovner and Hamilton, dissenting. Barrett wrote a rare opinion concurring in the denial of rehearing en banc (joined by Judge Joel Flaum).

==== Abortion-related cases ====
Barrett had never ruled directly on abortion before joining the Supreme Court, but she did vote to rehear a successful challenge to Indiana's parental notification law in 2019. In 2018, she voted against striking down another Indiana law requiring burial or cremation of fetal remains. In both cases, Barrett voted with the minority. The Supreme Court later reinstated the fetal remains law, and in July 2020 it ordered a rehearing in the parental notification case.

In February 2019, Barrett joined a unanimous panel decision upholding a Chicago "bubble ordinance" that prohibits approaching within a certain distance of an abortion clinic or its patrons without consent. Citing the Supreme Court's buffer zone decision in Hill v. Colorado, the court rejected the plaintiffs' challenge to the ordinance on First Amendment grounds.

==== Second Amendment ====
In March 2019, Barrett dissented when the court upheld the federal law prohibiting felons from possessing firearms. The majority rejected the as-applied challenge raised by plaintiff Rickey Kanter, who had been convicted of felony mail fraud, and upheld the felony dispossession statute as "substantially related to an important government interest in preventing gun violence." In her dissent, Barrett argued that while the government has a legitimate interest in denying gun possession to felons convicted of violent crimes, there is no evidence that denying guns to nonviolent felons promotes this interest, and that the law violates the Second Amendment. President Trump pardoned Kanter in December 2020.

==== Criminal procedure ====
In May 2018, Barrett dissented when the panel majority found that an accused murderer's right to counsel was violated when the state trial judge directly questioned the accused while forbidding his attorney from speaking. Following rehearing en banc, a majority of the circuit's judges agreed with her position.

In August 2018, Barrett wrote for a unanimous panel when it determined that the police had lacked probable cause to search a vehicle based solely upon an anonymous tip that people were "playing with guns", because no crime had been alleged. Barrett distinguished Navarette v. California and wrote, "the police were right to respond to the anonymous call by coming to the parking lot to determine what was happening. But determining what was happening and immediately seizing people upon arrival are two different things, and the latter was premature...Watson's case presents a close call. But this one falls on the wrong side of the Fourth Amendment."

In February 2019, Barrett wrote for a unanimous panel when it found that police officers had been unreasonable to assume "that a woman who answers the door in a bathrobe has authority to consent to a search of a male suspect's residence." Therefore, the district court should have granted the defendant's motion to suppress evidence found in the residence as the fruit of an unconstitutional search.

==== Qualified immunity ====
In January 2019, Barrett wrote for a unanimous panel when it denied qualified immunity to a civil lawsuit sought by a defendant who as a homicide detective had knowingly provided false and misleading information in the probable cause affidavit that was used to obtain an arrest warrant for the plaintiff. (The charges were later dropped and the plaintiff was released.) The court found the defendant's lies and omissions violated "clearly established law" and the plaintiff's Fourth Amendment rights and thus the detective was not shielded by qualified immunity.

In Howard v. Koeller (7th Cir. 2018), in an unsigned order by a three-judge panel that included Barrett, the court found that qualified immunity did not protect a prison officer who had labeled a prisoner a "snitch" and thereby exposed him to risk from his fellow inmates.

==== Environment ====
In Orchard Hill Building Co. v. U.S. Army Corps of Engineers, 893 F.3d 1017 (7th Cir. 2018), Barrett joined a unanimous panel decision, written by Judge Amy J. St. Eve, in a case brought by a property developer challenging the Corps' determination that a wetland 11 mi (18 km) from the nearest navigable river was among the "waters of the United States." The court found that the Corps had not provided substantial evidence of a significant nexus to navigable-in-fact waters under Justice Kennedy's concurrence in the Supreme Court's decision in Rapanos v. United States. The case was remanded to the Corps to reconsider whether such a significant nexus exists between the wetlands in question and navigable waters for it to maintain jurisdiction over the land.

==== Consumer protection ====
In June 2018, Barrett wrote for the unanimous panel when it found that a plaintiff could not sue Teva Pharmaceuticals for alleged defects in her IUD due to the lack of supportive expert testimony, writing, "the issue of causation in her case is not obvious."

==== Coronavirus measures ====
In early September 2020, Barrett joined Wood's opinion upholding the district court's denial of the Illinois Republican Party's request for a preliminary injunction to block Governor J. B. Pritzker's COVID-19 orders. On August 12, 2021, she rejected a challenge to Indiana University's vaccine mandate, marking the first legal test of COVID-19 vaccine mandates before the Supreme Court of the United States.

==== Civil procedure and standing ====
In June 2019, Barrett wrote for the unanimous panel when it found that the Fair Debt Collection Practices Act cannot create a cause of action for a debtor who received collection letters lacking notices required by the statute because she suffered no injury-in-fact to create constitutional standing to sue under Article III. Wood dissented from the denial of rehearing en banc. The issue created a circuit split.

In August 2020, Barrett wrote for the unanimous panel when it held that a Teamsters local did not have standing to appeal an order in the Shakman case because it was not formally a party to the case. The union had not intervened in the action, but rather merely submitted a memorandum in the district court opposing a motion, which the Seventh Circuit determined was insufficient to give the union a right to appeal.

== Nomination to the Supreme Court ==
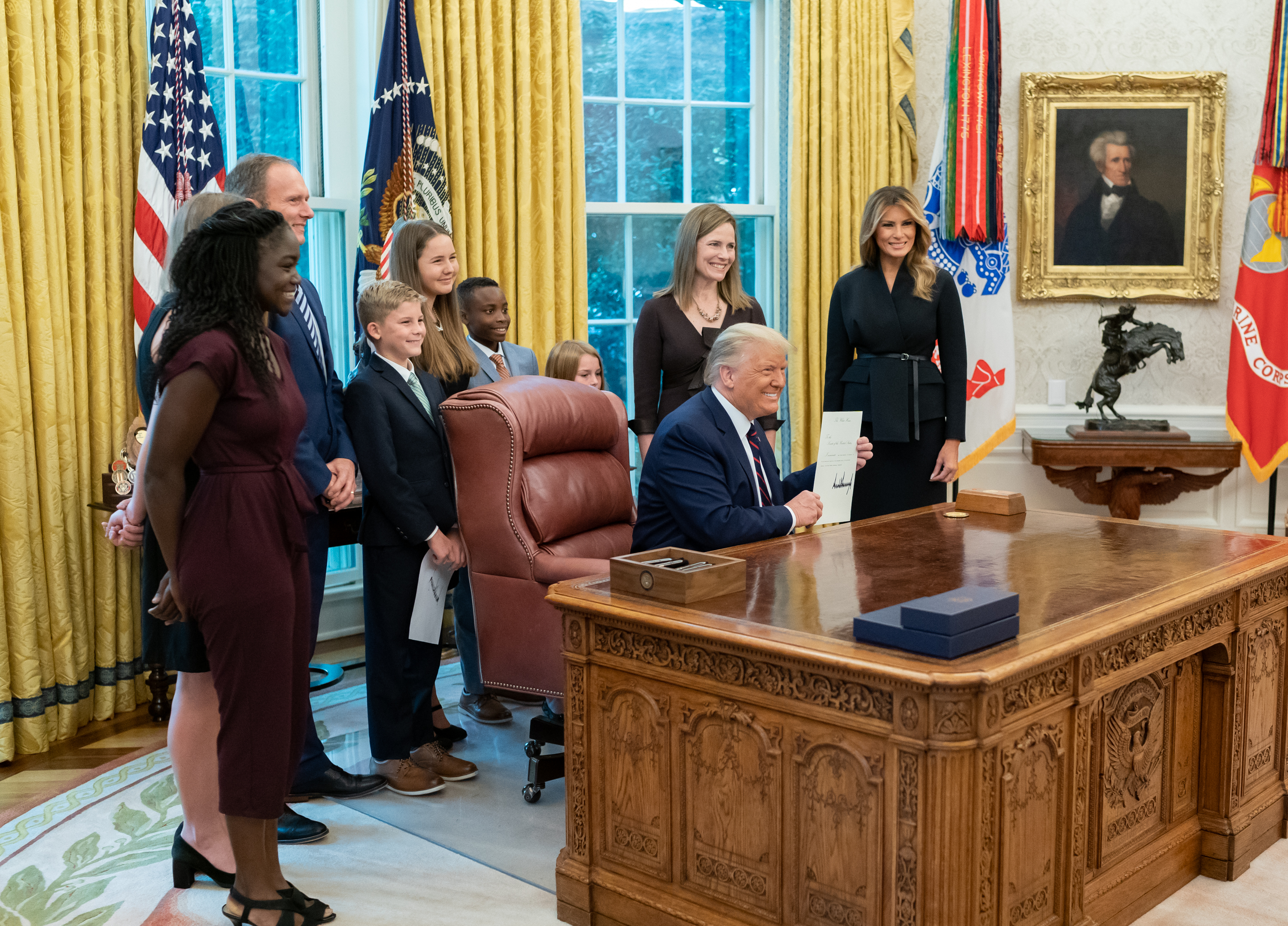
President Donald Trump nominated Barrett to the Supreme Court on September 26, 2020.

Barrett was on Trump's list of potential Supreme Court nominees since 2017, almost immediately after her court of appeals confirmation. In July 2018, after Justice Anthony Kennedy's retirement announcement, she was reportedly one of three finalists Trump considered, along with Kavanaugh and Judge Raymond Kethledge.

After Kavanaugh's selection in 2018, Barrett was viewed as a possible nominee for a future United States Supreme Court vacancy. After the death of Associate Justice Ruth Bader Ginsburg on September 18, 2020, Barrett was widely mentioned as the front-runner to succeed her. On September 26, 2020, Trump announced his intention to nominate Barrett to fill the vacancy created by Ginsburg's death.

Barrett's nomination was generally supported by Republicans, who sought to confirm her before the 2020 United States presidential election. She was a favorite among the Christian right and social conservatives. Democrats generally opposed the nomination, and were opposed to filling the court vacancy while election voting was already underway in many states. Many observers were angered by the move to fill the vacancy only four months before the end of Trump's term, as the Senate Republican majority had refused to consider President Barack Obama's nomination of Merrick Garland in 2016, more than ten months before the end of his presidency.

In October, the American Bar Association rated Barrett "well qualified" for the Supreme Court opening, its highest rating. The ABA confines its evaluation to the qualities of "integrity, professional competence, and judicial temperament". Barrett's nomination came during a White House COVID-19 outbreak. On October 5, Senator Lindsey Graham formally scheduled the confirmation hearing, which began on October 12 as planned and lasted four days. On October 22, the Judiciary Committee reported her confirmation favorably by a 12–0 vote, with all 10 Democrats boycotting the committee meeting. On October 25, the Senate voted mostly along party lines to end debate on the confirmation. On October 26, the Senate confirmed Barrett to the Supreme Court by a vote of 52–48, 30 days after her nomination and 8 days before the 2020 presidential election. Every Republican senator except Susan Collins voted to confirm her, whereas every member of the Senate Democratic Caucus voted in opposition. Barrett is the first justice since 1870 to be confirmed without a single vote from the Senate minority party.

== United States Supreme Court (2020–present) ==
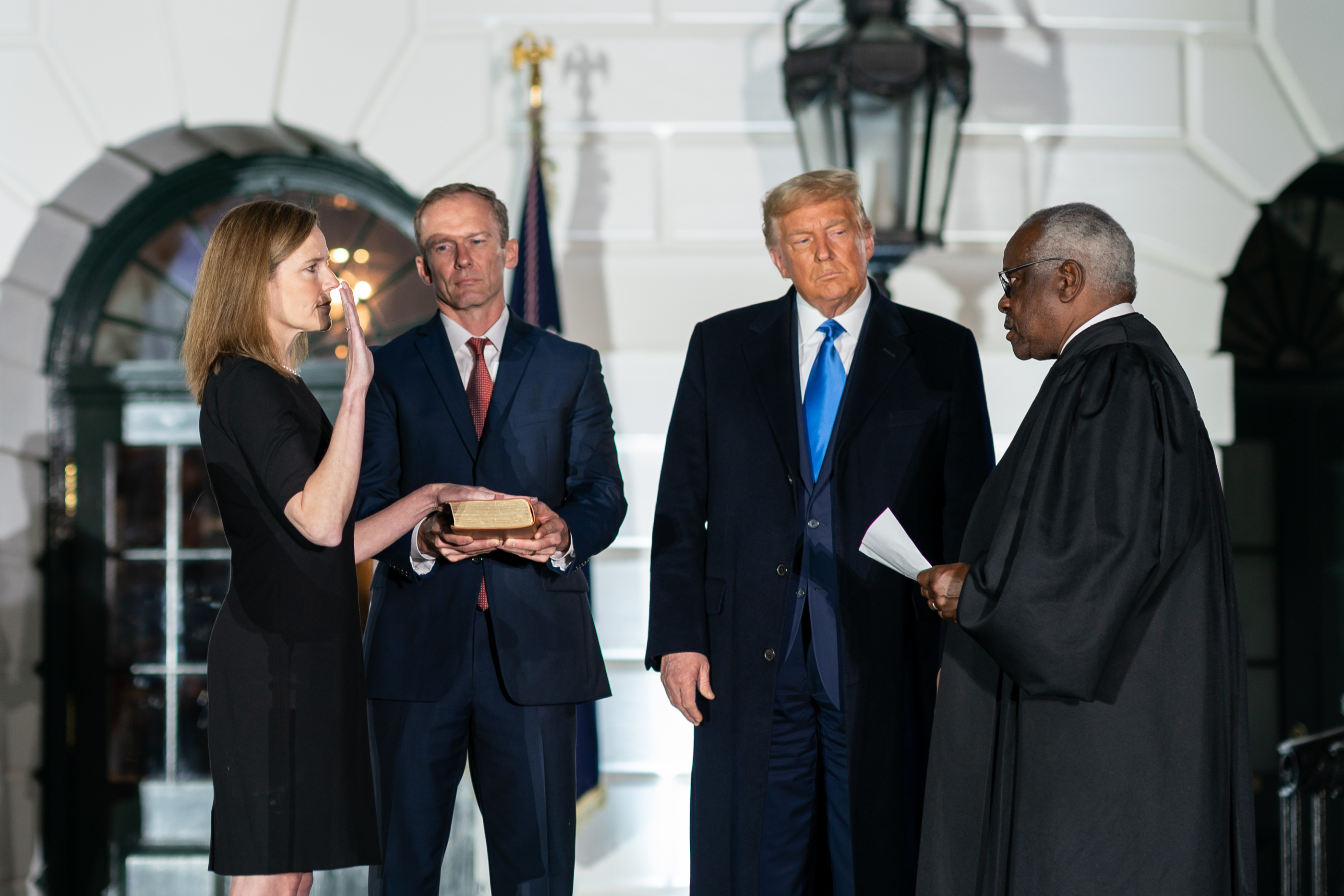
Justice Clarence Thomas administers the oath of office to Barrett on October 26, 2020, at the White House alongside President Donald Trump.

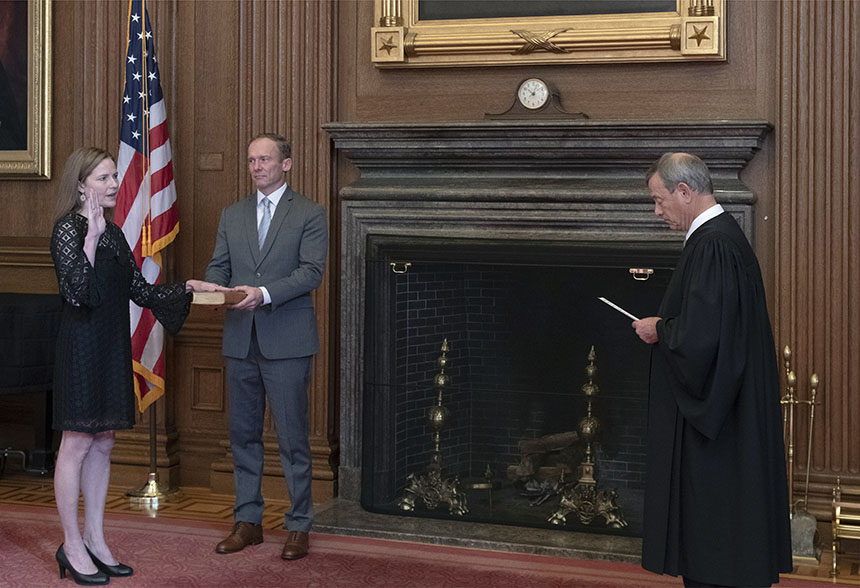
Chief Justice John Roberts administers the judicial oath to Barrett on October 27, 2020. Justice Barrett's husband, Jesse M. Barrett, holds the Bible.

Barrett became the 103rd associate justice of the Supreme Court of the United States on October 27, 2020. On the evening of the confirmation vote, Trump hosted a swearing-in ceremony at the White House. As Barrett requested, Justice Clarence Thomas administered the oath of office to her, the first of two necessary oaths. She took the judicial oath, administered by Chief Justice John Roberts, the next day.

Upon joining the Court, Barrett became the only justice who did not receive their Juris Doctor from Harvard or Yale. She is also the first justice without an Ivy League degree since the 2010 retirement of John Paul Stevens (who graduated from the University of Chicago and Northwestern University School of Law) and the first to be appointed since Sandra Day O'Connor, who graduated from Stanford University and Stanford Law School. She is the first graduate of Notre Dame Law School and the first former member of the Notre Dame faculty to serve on the Supreme Court.

Barrett uses her maiden and married surnames in public. She has chosen to be called "Justice Barrett" in written orders and opinions of the court, as she did as a Seventh Circuit judge.

=== Circuit assignment ===
In November 2020, Barrett was assigned to the Seventh Circuit. This assignment's duties include responding to emergency applications to the Court that arise from the circuit's jurisdiction, either by herself or else by referring them to the full Court for review.

=== Early oral argument participation ===
Having hired her allotted four law clerks, Barrett took part in her first oral argument on November 2, hearing the case U.S. Fish and Wildlife Service v. Sierra Club.

On November 4, the Court heard Fulton v. Philadelphia, in which the plaintiff, Catholic Social Services, sued the city of Philadelphia after being denied a new contract under the city's Fair Practices Ordinance, which bars discrimination in public accommodations. The Archdiocese-affiliated CSS said that for religious reasons it cannot properly vet potential foster parents who are gay couples. CSS argued that under relevant precedent, the Court should find that CSS as a faith-based charity was unfairly singled out, given that the city allows race- and disability-based exceptions within foster-care placements. CSS further claimed the law is shown not to be neutral as required by the Court's 1990 decision Employment Division v. Smith, which allows the government to enforce neutral and generally applicable laws without having to make exceptions for individual religions, because the city labeled CSS's motives "discrimination that occurs under the guise of religious freedom." According to the New York Times, Barrett's questions during oral arguments were "evenhanded and did not reveal her position."

=== First votes as a justice ===
On November 26, 2020, Barrett joined the Supreme Court's majority in Roman Catholic Diocese of Brooklyn v. Cuomo, in an unsigned 5–4 preliminary injunction in favor of the Roman Catholic Diocese of Brooklyn and the Orthodox Jewish organization Agudath Israel of America, saying that certain COVID-19 restrictions instituted by New York Governor Andrew Cuomo had likely violated the Free Exercise Clause of the First Amendment, in that they "single out houses of worship for especially harsh treatment." The Court said that the restrictions had likely impinged on the fundamental right of the free exercise of religion without their (in constitutional legal parlance) passing the legal test of "strict scrutiny." Cuomo's order was more restrictive than governmental orders involved in similar cases involving churches in California and Nevada that the Court had allowed to stand by a 5–4 vote. Ross Guberman, author of Point Taken: How to Write Like the World's Best Judges, told the Times he believed Barrett was the principal author of the Court's decision because of its measured tone and word choices, including its use of the word "show".

Barrett delivered her first concurring opinion on February 5, 2021, in the case South Bay United Pentecostal Church v. Newsom.

=== Abortion ===
In September 2021, Barrett joined the majority, in a 5–4 vote, to reject a petition to temporarily block a Texas law banning abortion after six weeks of pregnancy; Thomas, Alito, Gorsuch, and Kavanaugh joined her in the majority. In June 2022, Barrett joined with the same majority in Dobbs v. Jackson, voting to completely overturn Roe v. Wade and Planned Parenthood v. Casey.

=== Capital punishment ===
In January 2022, the Supreme Court voted to allow the execution of an inmate to proceed in Alabama; the case was decided by a 5–4 vote, with Barrett joining Breyer, Sotomayor, and Kagan in dissent.

=== Environmental policy ===
Barrett wrote her first majority opinion in United States Fish and Wildlife Service v. Sierra Club, which was decided on March 4, 2021. Traditionally the first opinion delivered by a new justice reflects the opinion of a unanimous court, but not always. While Gorsuch and Kavanaugh wrote unanimous first opinions, Barrett, like her predecessor Justice Ginsburg, wrote an opinion for a divided court.

Although Barrett ruled against environmentalists in March, she voted against oil refineries in her first dissent, Hollyfrontier Cheyenne Refining v. Renewable Fuels Association.

=== LGBT rights and issues ===
In June 2021, Barrett joined a unanimous decision in Fulton v. City of Philadelphia, ruling in favor of a Catholic social service agency that had been denied funding from the City of Philadelphia because it does not adopt to same-sex couples; the ruling also declined to overturn Employment Division v. Smith, "an important precedent limiting First Amendment protections for religious practices." In the same month, Barrett was among the six justices who rejected the appeal of a Washington State florist whom lower courts had ruled violated non-discrimination laws by refusing to sell floral arrangements to a same-sex couple based on her religious beliefs against same-sex marriage, leaving the lower court judgments in place. In November 2021, Barrett voted with the majority in a 6–3 decision to reject an appeal from Mercy San Juan Medical Center, a hospital affiliated with the Roman Catholic Church, which had sought to deny a hysterectomy to a transgender patient on religious grounds. The Court's decision not to hear the case left in place a lower court ruling in favor of the transgender patient; justices Thomas, Alito, and Gorsuch dissented. In November 2023, Barrett voted with the 6–3 majority to decline to hear an appeal of a decision that upheld Washington's ban on conversion therapy for minors, allowing the law to stand; Kavanaugh, Thomas, and Alito dissented.

=== Vaccine requirements ===
Barrett wrote a concurring opinion in Does v. Mills, a case challenging Maine's vaccine requirement for health care workers. She was in the majority in the 6–3 decision to deny a stay of the vaccine requirement, explaining that the case had not been fully briefed or argued.

== Judicial philosophy, academic writings, speeches, and political views ==
Many of Barrett's academic writings are about a professed imperative that jurists limit their work to determining the meanings of constitutional and statutory texts, reconciling these meanings with Supreme Court precedent, and using such precedent to mediate among various jurisprudential philosophies.

According to an analysis by University of Virginia law professors Joshua Fischman and Kevin Cope, Barrett was the rightmost Seventh Circuit judge, though not statistically distinguishable from six other Republican-appointed judges on the court. Compared to the other Seventh Circuit judges, she was more conservative on civil rights issues and less conservative on cases involving employment discrimination, labor and criminal defendants. According to a review by Reuters, Barrett's Seventh Circuit rulings showed that she mostly sided with police and prison guards when they were accused of excessive force. Due to the judicial doctrine of qualified immunity, police-officer defendants in many of these cases were shielded from civil liability because their actions were deemed not in violation of clearly established law. Jay Schweikert, who advocates for the Court's or Congress's elimination of qualified immunity, believes that her "decisions all look like reasonable applications of existing precedent." Legal commentator Jacob Sullum argues that while Barrett was on the Seventh Circuit she took "a constrained view of the doctrine's scope."

=== Textualism and originalism ===
Barrett is considered a textualist, a proponent of the idea that statutes should be interpreted literally, without considering their legislative history or underlying purpose, and an originalist (of the original-public-meaning, rather than original-intent, variety), a proponent of the idea that the Constitution should be interpreted as perceived at the time of enactment. According to her, "Originalism is characterized by a commitment to two core principles. First, the meaning of the constitutional text is fixed at the time of its ratification. Second, the historical meaning of the text 'has legal significance and is authoritative in most circumstances.'" For the purpose of "describing the disagreement between originalists and nonoriginalists about the authoritativeness of the original public meaning," she refers to a section of a law review article by Keith Whittington, "Originalism: A Critical Introduction", that reads, "Critics of originalism have suggested a range of considerations that might trump original meaning if the two were to come into conflict. From this perspective, fidelity to original meaning is not the chief goal of constitutional theory ... Confronted with suitably unpleasant results, the nonoriginalist might posit that the original meaning should be sacrificed. Alternatively, we might think that contemporary public opinion should trump original meaning ... underlying all these considerations is a view that courts are authorized to impose constitutional rules other than those adopted by the constitutional drafters ... the originalist must insist that judges not close their eyes to the discoverable meaning of the Constitution and announce some other constitutional rule to supersede it. It is at that point that the originalist and the nonoriginalist must part ways."

Textualism, Barrett says, requires that judges construe statutory language consistent with its "ordinary meaning": "The law is comprised of words—and textualists emphasize that words mean what they say, not what a judge thinks that they ought to say." According to Barrett, "Textualism stands in contrast to purposivism, a method of statutory interpretation that was dominant through much of the 20th century." If a court concludes that statutory language appears to be in tension with a statute's overarching goal, "purposivists argue that a judge should go with the goal rather than the text." For Barrett, textualism is not literalism, nor is it about rigid dictionary definitions. "It is about identifying the plain communicative content of the words".

Barrett clerked for Justice Antonin Scalia, and has spoken and written of her admiration of his adherence to the text of statutes and to originalism, writing: "His judicial philosophy is mine, too. A judge must apply the law as written. Judges are not policymakers, and they must be resolute in setting aside any policy views they may hold." In one article she quoted Scalia on the importance of the original meaning of the Constitution: "The validity of government depends upon the consent of the governed ... [s]o what the people agreed to when they adopted the Constitution ... is what ought to govern us." In a 2017 article in the law review Constitutional Commentary, reviewing a book by Randy E. Barnett, Barrett wrote: "The Constitution's original public meaning is important not because adhering to it limits judicial discretion, but because it is the law. ...The Constitution's meaning is fixed until lawfully changed; thus, the court must stick with the original public meaning of the text even if it rules out the preference of a current majority."

According to Barrett, textualists believe that when a court interprets the words of statutes, it should use the most natural meaning of those words to an ordinary skilled user of words at the time, even if the court believes that the legislature intended that the words be understood in a different sense. If the legislature wishes the words of a statute to carry a meaning different from how a non-legislator would understand them, it is free to define the terms in the statute. As Scalia put it, "[A]ll we can know is that [the legislature] voted for a text that they presumably thought would be read the same way any reasonable English speaker would read it." Scalia insisted that "it is simply incompatible with democratic government, or indeed, even with fair government, to have the meaning of a law determined by what the lawgiver meant, rather than by what the lawmaker promulgated."

Barrett has been critical of legal process theory, which gives a more expansive role to theory in shaping the interpretation of law than do textualism and originalism. She said that one example of the "process-based" approach can be found in King v. Burwell, in which the Supreme Court, for reasons related to the unorthodox legislative process that produced the Affordable Care Act, interpreted the phrase "Exchange established by the State" to mean "Exchange established by the State or the federal government."

==== Suspension of habeas corpus ====
In a journal article, "Suspension and Delegation", Barrett noted that constitutionally only Congress has the authority to decide the terms under which habeas corpus may be legitimately suspended. In all but one of the previous suspensions of habeas corpus, Barrett thought that Congress violated the Constitution "by enacting a suspension statute before an invasion or rebellion occurred—and in some instances, before one was even on the horizon." In an educational essay, she sided with the dissenters in Boumediene v. Bush after considering historical factors.

=== Precedent ===
At her 2017 Senate confirmation hearing for the 7th Circuit Court of Appeals, Barrett said she would follow Supreme Court precedent while on the appellate bench. In 2020, during her nomination acceptance speech at the White House Rose Garden, Barrett said, "Judges are not policymakers, and they must be resolute in setting aside any policy views they might hold"; she also said judges "must apply the law as written". She explained her view of precedent in response to questions at the hearing.

In a 2013 article in the Texas Law Review on the doctrine of stare decisis, Barrett listed seven cases that she believed should be considered "superprecedents"—cases the Court would never consider overturning. They included Brown v. Board of Education and Mapp v. Ohio (incorporating the Fourth Amendment onto the states), but specifically excluded Roe v. Wade (1973). In explaining why it was excluded, Barrett referenced scholarship agreeing that in order to qualify as "superprecedent", a decision must have widespread support from not only jurists but politicians and the public at large to the extent of becoming immune to reversal or challenge (for example, the constitutionality of paper money). She argued that the people must trust a ruling's validity to such an extent that the matter has been taken "off of the Court's agenda", with lower courts no longer taking challenges to them seriously. Barrett pointed to Planned Parenthood v. Casey (1992) as evidence that Roe had not attained this status, and quoted Richard H. Fallon Jr.: "[A] decision as fiercely and enduringly contested as Roe v. Wade has acquired no immunity from serious judicial reconsideration, even if arguments for overruling it ought not succeed."

Concerning the relationship of textualism to precedent, Barrett said, "It makes sense that one committed to a textualist theory would more often find precedent in conflict with her interpretation of the Constitution than would one who takes a more flexible, all-things-considered approach." She referenced a study by Michael Gerhardt which found that, as of 1994, no two justices in that century had called for overruling more precedents than Justices Scalia and Hugo Black, both of whom were textualists, even though Black was a liberal and Scalia a conservative. Gerhardt also found that during the Rehnquist Court's last 11 years, the average number of times a justice called for the overruling of precedent was higher for textualist justices, with one per year coming from Ginsburg (non-textualist) up to just over two per year from Thomas (textualist). Gerhardt wrote that not all the calls for overruling were related to textualism issues, and that one must be careful in the inferences one draws from the numbers, which "do not indicate either why or on what basis the justices urged overruling."

=== Affordable Care Act ===
In 2012, Barrett signed a letter criticizing the Obama administration's approach to providing employees of religious institutions with birth control coverage without having the religious institutions pay for it, calling it an "assault" to religious liberty.

Barrett has been critical of the majority opinion written by Chief Justice John Roberts in National Federation of Independent Businesses v. Sebelius (2012), which upheld the constitutionality of the Affordable Care Act's individual mandate. She wrote in 2017: "Chief Justice Roberts pushed the Affordable Care Act beyond its plausible meaning to save the statute. He construed the penalty imposed on those without health insurance as a tax, which permitted him to sustain the statute as a valid exercise of the taxing power; had he treated the payment as the statute did—as a penalty—he would have had to invalidate the statute as lying beyond Congress's commerce power."

=== Abortion ===
Barrett opposes abortion. In 2006, she signed an advertisement placed by St. Joseph County Right to Life, an anti-abortion group, in a South Bend, Indiana, newspaper. The ad read: "We, the following citizens of Michiana, oppose abortion on demand and defend the right to life from fertilization to natural death. Please continue to pray to end abortion." An unsigned, second page of the advertisement read, "It's time to put an end to the barbaric legacy of Roe v. Wade and restore laws that protect the lives of unborn children." In 2013, Barrett signed another ad against Roe v. Wade that appeared in Notre Dame's student newspaper and described the decision as having "killed 55 million unborn children". The same year, she spoke at two anti-abortion events at the university.

== Personal life ==
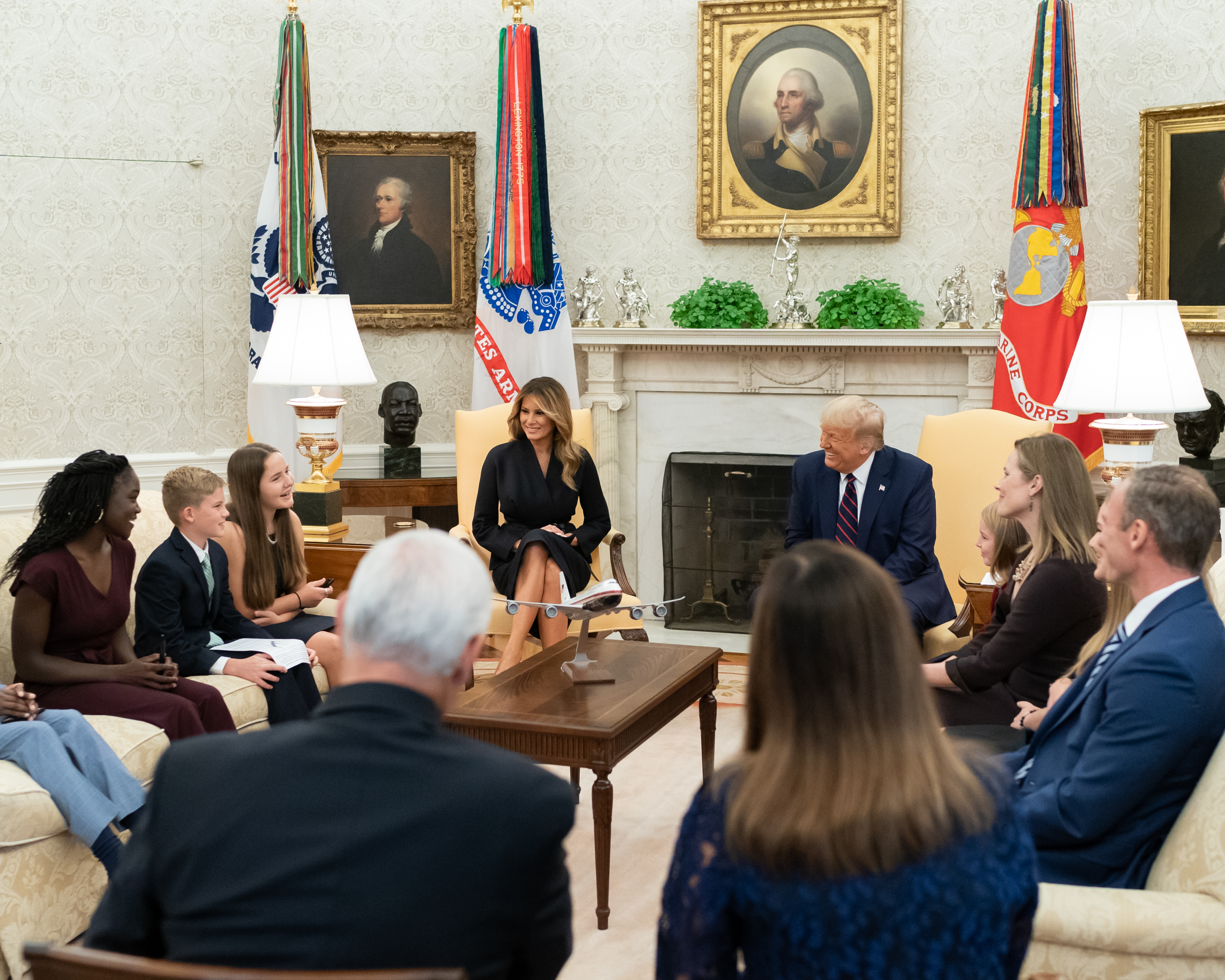
Barrett and her family with President Trump on September 26, 2020

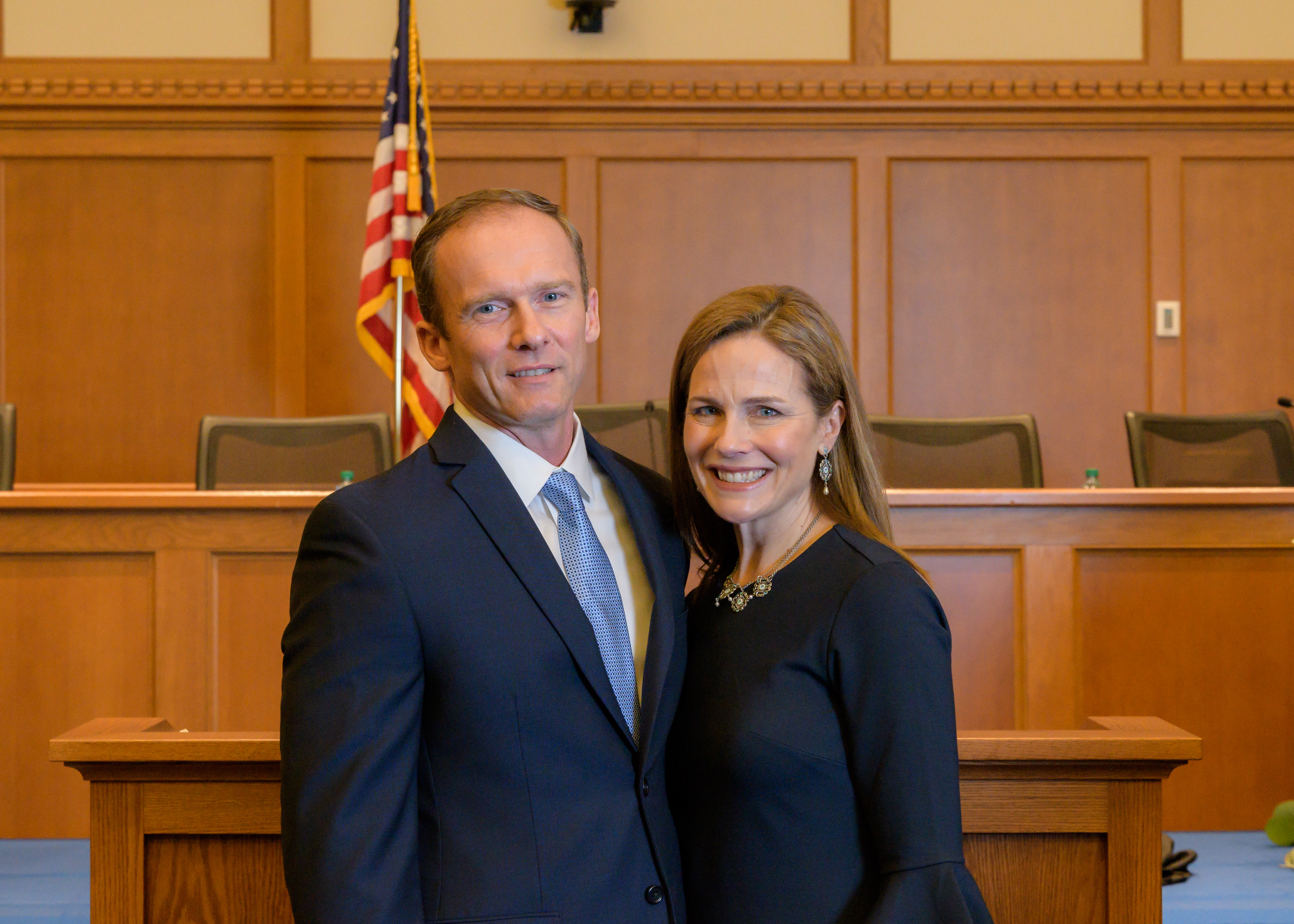
Barrett with her husband, Jesse, in 2018

In 1999, Barrett married fellow Notre Dame Law School graduate Jesse M. Barrett, a partner at SouthBank Legal – LaDue Curran & Kuehn LLC, in South Bend, Indiana, and a law professor at Notre Dame Law School. Previously, Jesse Barrett had worked as an Assistant United States Attorney for the Northern District of Indiana for 13 years. The couple lived in South Bend, but moved to the Washington D.C. area upon her confirmation to the court. They have seven children, two of whom were adopted from Haiti, one in 2005 and one after the 2010 Haiti earthquake. Their youngest biological child has Down syndrome.

Barrett is a practicing Catholic. Since birth, she has been a member of the Christian parachurch community People of Praise, an ecumenical covenant community founded in South Bend. Associated with the Catholic charismatic renewal movement but not formally affiliated with the Catholic Church, about 90% of its approximately 1,700 members are Catholic. In People of Praise, Barrett has served as a laypastoral women's leader in a position once termed "handmaiden" but now termed "women leader".

According to Politico, "a copy of Barrett's ballot history from the Indiana Statewide Voter Registration System obtained by POLITICO [shows] Barrett voted in the 2016 and 2018 general elections, and the 2016 Republican primary, though she pulled a Democratic ballot in the 2011 primary."

On September 28, 2025, Barrett released a memoir, Listening to the Law. The book includes her personal reflections on her journey to the Supreme Court, an explanation of how she approaches constitutional interpretation, and an introductory overview of constitutional law.

== Affiliations ==
Barrett was a member of the Federalist Society from 2005 to 2006 and from 2014 to 2017. She is a member of the American Law Institute.

== Selected scholarly works ==
=== Books published ===
- Barrett (2025). Listening to the Law: Reflections on the Court and Constitution. New York: Sentinel. ISBN 978-0-593-42186-4 OCLC 1517012921

=== Legal scholarship ===
- Barrett; Garvey (1998). "Catholic Judges in Capital Cases". Marquette Law Review. 81: 303–350.
- Barrett (2003). "Stare Decisis and Due Process". University of Colorado Law Review. 74: 1011–1074.
- Barrett (2005). "Statutory Stare Decisis in the Courts of Appeals". The George Washington Law Review. 73: 317–352.
- Barrett (2006). "The Supervisory Power of the Supreme Court". Columbia Law Review. 106 (2): 324–387. JSTOR 4099494.
- Barrett (2008). "Procedural Common Law" (PDF). Virginia Law Review. 94 (4): 813–888. JSTOR 25470574. Archived from the original (PDF) on September 24, 2020.
- Barrett (2010). "Substantive Canons and Faithful Agency" (PDF). Boston University Law Review. 90: 109–182.
- Barrett (2013). "Precedent and Jurisprudential Disagreement" (PDF). Texas Law Review. 91: 1711–1737.
- Barrett (2014). "Suspension and Delegation". Cornell Law Review. 99: 251–326.
- Barrett; John Copeland Nagle (2016). "Congressional Originalism". University of Pennsylvania Journal of Constitutional Law. 19: 1–44. Archived from the original on May 7, 2017.
- Barrett (2017). "Originalism and Stare Decisis". Notre Dame Law Review. 92: 1921–1944.
- Barrett (2017). "Congressional Insiders and Outsiders". University of Chicago Law Review. 84: 2193–2212. JSTOR 45063672.

== See also ==
- Donald Trump Supreme Court candidates
- List of federal judges appointed by Donald Trump
- List of law clerks for the ninth seat of the Supreme Court of the United States
- White House COVID-19 outbreak, at a ceremony for Barrett's nomination
- Ziklag (organization)

Legal offices
Preceded by John Daniel Tinder	Judge of the United States Court of Appeals for the Seventh Circuit; 2017–2020	Succeeded by Thomas Kirsch
Preceded by Ruth Bader Ginsburg	Associate Justice of the Supreme Court of the United States; 2020–present	Incumbent
U.S. order of precedence (ceremonial)
Preceded by Brett Kavanaugh	Order of precedence of the United States as Associate Justice of the Supreme Court	Succeeded by Ketanji Brown Jackson
