= Public Order Act 2023 =

Act of the Parliament of the United Kingdom

Public Order Act 2023 (Note: Section 35(9).)
- Act of Parliament
- Parliament of the United Kingdom
- Long title: An Act to make provision for new offences relating to public order; to make provision about stop and search powers; to make provision about the exercise of police functions relating to public order; to make provision about proceedings by the Secretary of State relating to protest-related activities; to make provision about serious disruption prevention orders; and for connected purposes.
- Citation: 2023 c. 15
- Introduced by: Priti Patel, Secretary of State for the Home Department (Commons); The Lord Sharpe of Epsom, Parliamentary Under-Secretary of State for the Home Department (Lords)
- Territorial extent: England and Wales; but provisions amending Acts which extend to Scotland and Northern Ireland extend to those countries (Note: Section 35(1)–(2).)

Dates
- Royal assent: 2 May 2023
- Commencement: Various (Note: Section 35(3)–(7).)
Other legislation
Amends	Prosecution of Offences Act 1985; Public Order Act 1986; Sentencing Act 2020
Amended by	Public Order Act 2023 (Interference With Use or Operation of Key National Infrastructure) Regulations 2026

Status: Amended

History of passage through Parliament

Text of statute as originally enacted

Revised text of statute as amended

The Public Order Act 2023 (c. 15), referred to during its passage through Parliament as the public order bill and the anti-protest bill, is an act of the Parliament of the United Kingdom which gave law enforcement agencies in the United Kingdom greater powers to prevent protest tactics deemed "disruptive" such as those used by climate protestors. It received royal assent on 2 May 2023.

This bill followed the Police, Crime, Sentencing and Courts Act 2022, which reintroduced measures previously rejected by the House of Lords. As with the previous act, this bill also received criticism in regards to declining civil liberties in the country. The Joint Committee on Human Rights "called for key measures in the legislation to be watered down or scrapped because the laws would have a "chilling effect" on people in England and Wales seeking to exercise their legitimate democratic rights."

== Details of the act ==
The act introduces new offences for locking on (with 51-week sentences), interfering with key national infrastructure, obstructing major transport works, causing serious disruption by tunnelling, greater stop and search powers to prevent disruptive protests (including without suspicion), and "Serious Disruption Prevention Orders" "which can restrict people's freedom by imposing conditions on repeat offenders".

The act is "explicitly targeted at protesters", such as "the current outbreak of climate protests across Britain". The government specifically named the protests of Extinction Rebellion, Just Stop Oil, and Insulate Britain as reasons it is needed.

Measures previously rejected by the House of Lords in consideration of the Police, Crime, Sentencing and Courts Act 2022, including banning individuals from protests, were reintroduced.

In January 2023, Prime Minister Rishi Sunak's government announced plans to amend the Public Order Bill before it becomes law "to broaden the legal definition of 'serious disruption', give police more flexibility, and provide legal clarity on when the new powers could be used."

The act also includes measures to create safe access zones around abortion clinics with a radius of 150 metres. These provisions were brought into force in 2024.

== Legislative history ==
The bill was announced in the Queen's speech on 10 May 2022.

In October 2022, MPs passed the bill by 276 votes to 231. In January 2023, the House of Lords overturned plans to increase police powers to allow them to restrict protests by 254 votes to 240 and added a clause restricting protests within 150 metres of an abortion clinic. In March, the House of Commons upheld the abortion-related provision, on which the Conservative Party permitted a free vote, by 299 votes to 116. Meanwhile, other amendments made by the House of Lords, including those limiting the powers police officers would be granted under the law, were rejected.

Following a months-long parliamentary ping-pong, conflicts between the two Houses were ultimately resolved on 26 April 2023, when the Lords decided by voice vote not to insist on amendments the Commons disagreed with.

The bill received royal assent by King Charles III on 2 May 2023 and became an act of Parliament.

The sections of the act creating the offences related to locking on as well as interference with key national infrastructure came into force by statutory instrument on 3 May 2023. On 2 July 2023, the sections of the act creating the offences related to tunnelling and obstruction of major transport works came into force, along with the section creating a requirement that police cannot use their powers solely to prevent individuals from observing or reporting on a protest. On 4 April 2024, regulations were made to bring into force the provisions relating to serious disruption prevention orders with effect from 5 April 2024.

== Criticism ==
In October 2022, the Parliament of the United Kingdom's Joint Committee on Human Rights said:

"it is concerned the offence could encompass demonstrators who simply link arms with each other, and that it should be amended. [...] The committee said measures relating to the obstruction of major transport works covered actions that were not intended to cause significant disruption, while those related to interference with key national infrastructure covered those that were neither "key" nor "national". The proposed serious disruption prevention orders could prevent people being able to exercise their right to protest, the committee said, and represented a "disproportionate response" to any resulting disruption. It also expressed concerns about the extension of stop and search powers, allowing police to carry out searches where there were no reasonable grounds for suspicion."

In November 2022, writing for the Financial Times, formerly Conservative peer Camilla Cavendish called the bill "... an affront to a civilised society". The bill was also criticised by Amnesty International and Volker Türk, the United Nations High Commissioner for Human Rights. In January 2026, Human Rights Watch published a report criticising growing restrictions on peaceful protest in the United Kingdom, including provisions of the Public Order Act 2023.

== See also ==
- Public Order Act 1986
- Police, Crime, Sentencing and Courts Act 2022
- Criminal Justice and Public Order Act 1994
- Regarding the provision for safe access zones
  - Legal protection of access to abortion
  - Abortion Services (Safe Access Zones) (Scotland) Act 2024
  - Abortion Services (Safe Access Zones) Act (Northern Ireland) 2023
