= Schenck v. Pro-Choice Network of Western New York =

- Supreme Court of the United States

Argued October 16, 1996 Decided February 19, 1997
- Full case name: Paul Schenck and Dwight Saunders v. Pro-Choice Network of Western New York, et al.
- Citations: 519 U.S. 357 (more) 117 S. Ct. 855; 137 L. Ed. 2d 1; 1997 U.S. LEXIS 1270
- Argument: Oral argument

Holding
- The injunction provisions imposing "fixed buffer zone" limitations are constitutional, but the provisions imposing "floating buffer zone" limitations violate the First Amendment.

Court membership
- Chief Justice William Rehnquist Associate Justices John P. Stevens · Sandra Day O'Connor; Antonin Scalia · Anthony Kennedy; David Souter · Clarence Thomas; Ruth Bader Ginsburg · Stephen Breyer

Case opinions
- Majority: Rehnquist, joined by unanimous (Parts I, II–A); Stevens, O'Connor, Scalia, Kennedy, Souter, Thomas, Ginsburg (Part II–C); Stevens, O'Connor, Souter, Ginsburg, Breyer (Parts II–B, II–D)
- Concur/dissent: Scalia, joined by Kennedy, Thomas
- Concur/dissent: Breyer

Laws applied
- U.S. Const. amend. I

Schenck v. Pro-Choice Network of Western New York, 519 U.S. 357 (1997), was a case heard before the United States Supreme Court related to legal protection of access to abortion. The question before the court was whether the First Amendment was violated by placing an injunction on protesters outside abortion clinics. The court ruled in a 6–3 decision that "floating buffer zones" preventing protesters approaching people entering or leaving the clinics were unconstitutional, though "fixed buffer zones" around the clinics themselves remained constitutional. The Court's upholding the fixed buffer was the most important aspect of the ruling, because it was a common feature of injunctions nationwide.

Paul Schenck challenged a Federal District Court injunction that restricted "sidewalk counselors" from approaching abortion clinic patients and others with Bibles, tracts and anti-abortion messages. Because these protesters often violently harassed and intimidated patients and staff or prevented them from entering the clinic, the Court upheld the fixed buffer zone around the clinics, although it struck down the floating buffer zone around individuals because its indefinite and movable nature made it difficult to administer and risked overly restricting free speech.

== See also ==
- List of United States Supreme Court cases, volume 519
- List of United States Supreme Court cases
- Lists of United States Supreme Court cases by volume
