= List of statutory rules of Northern Ireland, 2023 =

This is a list of statutory rules made in the Northern Ireland in the year 2023.

== 1-100 ==
Number	Title
1	The Rates (Making and Levying of Different Rates) Regulations (Northern Ireland) 2023
2	The Housing Renovation etc. Grants (Grant Limit) (Amendment) Order (Northern Ireland) 2023
3	The Universal Credit (Administrative Earnings Threshold) (Amendment) Regulations (Northern Ireland) 2023
4	The Housing Benefit and Universal Credit Housing Costs (Executive Determinations) (Modification) Regulations (Northern Ireland) 2023
5	The Edible Crabs (Conservation) (Amendment) Regulations (Northern Ireland) 2023
6	The Packaging Waste (Data Reporting) Regulations (Northern Ireland) 2023
7	The Occupational Pension Schemes (Collective Money Purchase Schemes) Regulations (Northern Ireland) 2023
8	The Level Crossing (Cullybackey South) Order (Northern Ireland) 2023
9	The Level Crossing (Cullybackey North) Order (Northern Ireland) 2023
10	The Level Crossing (Cullybackey Station) Order (Northern Ireland) 2023
11	The Children’s Court Guardian Agency for Northern Ireland (Establishment and Constitution) Order (Northern Ireland) 2023
12 (C. 1)	The Adoption and Children (2022 Act) (Commencement No. 1) Order (Northern Ireland) 2023
13	The Guardians Ad Litem (Panel) (Revocation) Regulations (Northern Ireland) 2023
14 (C. 2)	The Organ and Tissue Donation (Deemed Consent) (2022 Act) (Commencement) Order (Northern Ireland) 2023
15	The Insolvency (Amendment) Rules (Northern Ireland) 2023
16	The Police Act 1997 (Criminal Records) (Amendment) Regulations (Northern Ireland) 2023
17	The Rehabilitation of Offenders (Exceptions) (Amendment) Order (Northern Ireland) 2023
18	The Tenancy Deposit Schemes (Amendment) Regulations (Northern Ireland) 2023
19	The Tenancy Information Regulations (Northern Ireland) 2023
20 (C. 3)	The Private Tenancies (2022 Act) (Commencement No.1) Order (Northern Ireland) 2023
21	The On-Street Parking (Amendment) Order (Northern Ireland) 2023
22	The Pension Protection Fund and Occupational Pension Schemes (Levy Ceiling) Order (Northern Ireland) 2023
23	Not Allocated
24	The Insolvency (Amendment) Rules (Northern Ireland) 2023
25	The Packaging Waste (Data Reporting) (No.2) Regulations (Northern Ireland) 2023
26	The Human Tissue (Permitted Material) Regulations (Northern Ireland) 2023
27	The Social Security (2022 Benefits Up-rating) Order (Northern Ireland) 2023
28	The Mesothelioma Lump Sum Payments (2022 Conditions and Amounts) (Amendment) Regulations (Northern Ireland) 2023
29	The Guaranteed Minimum Pensions Increase Order (Northern Ireland) 2023
30	The Social Security (2022 Benefits Up-rating) Regulations (Northern Ireland) 2023
31	The Loans for Mortgage Interest (Amendment) Regulations (Northern Ireland) 2023
32	The Recovery of Health Services Charges (Amounts) (Amendment) Regulations (Northern Ireland) 2023
33	The Health and Social Care Pension Scheme (Amendment) Regulations (Northern Ireland) 2023
34	Not Allocated
35	The Social Security Revaluation of Earnings Factors Order (Northern Ireland) 2023
36	The Employment Rights (Increase of Limits) Order (Northern Ireland) 2023
37	The Planning (Fees) (Amendment) Regulations (Northern Ireland) 2023
38	The Road Races (Circuit of Ireland Rally) Order (Northern Ireland) 2023
39	The Rate Relief (Amendment) Regulations (Northern Ireland) 2023
40	The Optical Charges and Payments (Amendment) Regulations (Northern Ireland) 2023
41	The Pension Protection Fund (Compensation) and Occupational Pension Schemes (Fraud Compensation Payments) (Amendment) Regulations (Northern Ireland) 2023
42	The Benefit Cap (Annual Limit) (Amendment) Regulations (Northern Ireland) 2023
43	The Social Security Benefits Up-rating Order (Northern Ireland) 2023
44	The Mesothelioma Lump Sum Payments (Conditions and Amounts) (Amendment) Regulations (Northern Ireland) 2023
45	The Social Security Benefits Up-rating Regulations (Northern Ireland) 2023
46	The Coronavirus Act 2020 (Extension of Provisions Relating to Live Links for Courts and Tribunals) Order (Northern Ireland) 2023
47	The Road Races (Croft Hill Climb) Order (Northern Ireland) 2023
48	The Coronavirus Act 2020 (Extension of Provisions Relating to Local Authority Meetings) Order (Northern Ireland) 2023
49	The Coronavirus Act 2020 (Registration of Deaths and Still-Births) (Extension) Order (Northern Ireland) 2023
50	The Coronavirus Act 2020 (Extension of Powers to Act for the Protection of Public Health) Order (Northern Ireland) 2023
51	The Coronavirus Act 2020 (Extension of Provisions Relating to Local Authority Meetings) (No. 2) Order (Northern Ireland) 2023
52	The Occupational Pension Schemes (Governance and Registration) (Amendment) Regulations (Northern Ireland) 2023
53	The Government Resources and Accounts (Northern Ireland) Act 2001 (Estimates and Accounts) (Designation of Bodies) Order 2023
54	The Public Service Pensions Revaluation Order (Northern Ireland) 2023
55	The Parental Bereavement Leave Regulations (Northern Ireland) 2023
56	The Parental Bereavement Leave and Pay (Consequential Amendments to Subordinate Legislation) Regulations (Northern Ireland) 2023
57	The Statutory Parental Bereavement Pay (General) Regulations (Northern Ireland) 2023
58	The Pensions Increase (Review) Order (Northern Ireland) 2023
59	The Occupational Pension Schemes (Master Trusts) Regulations (Northern Ireland) 2023
60	The Road Races (Cookstown 100 Motor Cycle Road Race) Order (Northern Ireland) 2023
61	The Road Races (Craigantlet Hill Climb) Order (Northern Ireland) 2023
62	The Occupational Pension Schemes (Administration, Investment, Charges and Governance) (Amendment) Regulations (Northern Ireland) 2023
63	The Judicial Pensions (Amendment) Regulations (Northern Ireland) 2023
64	The Police Service of Northern Ireland (Amendment) Regulations 2023
65	The Road Races (North West 200) Order (Northern Ireland) 2023
66	The Parking Places (Disabled Persons’ Vehicles) (Amendment) Order (Northern Ireland) 2023
67	The Social Security Benefits (Claims and Payments) (Amendment) Regulations (Northern Ireland) 2023
68	The Crown Court (Amendment) Rules (Northern Ireland) 2023
69	The Road Races (Drumhorc Hill Climb) Order (Northern Ireland) 2023
70	The Road Traffic (Fixed Penalty) (Offences) (Amendment) Order (Northern Ireland) 2023
71	The Road Traffic (Fixed Penalty) (Amendment) Order (Northern Ireland) 2023
72	The Licensing (Form of Licence) (Amendment) Regulations (Northern Ireland) 2023
73	The Road Races (Tour of the Sperrins) Order (Northern Ireland) 2023
74 (C. 5)	The Betting, Gaming, Lotteries and Amusements (Amendment) (2022 Act) (Commencement No.1) Order (Northern Ireland) 2023
75	The Road Races (Spamount Hill Climb) Order (Northern Ireland) 2023
76	The Roads (Speed Limit) Order (Northern Ireland) 2023
77	The Roads (Speed Limit) (No. 2) Order (Northern Ireland) 2023
78	The Local Government (Performance Indicators and Standards) (Amendment) Order (Northern Ireland) 2023
79	The Allocation of Housing and Homelessness (Eligibility) (Amendment) Regulations (Northern Ireland) 2023
80	The Social Security (Habitual Residence and Past Presence) (Amendment) Regulations (Northern Ireland) 2023
81	The Local Government Pension Scheme (Amendment) Regulations (Northern Ireland) 2023
82	The Parking Places (Disabled Persons’ Vehicles) (Amendment No. 2) Order (Northern Ireland) 2023
83	The Parking Places (Disabled Persons’ Vehicles) (Amendment No. 3) Order (Northern Ireland) 2023
84	The Parking Places (Disabled Persons’ Vehicles) (Amendment No. 4) Order (Northern Ireland) 2023
85	The Social Fund Winter Fuel Payment (Temporary Increase) Regulations (Northern Ireland) 2023
86	The Social Fund Maternity and Funeral Expenses (General) and Social Security (Claims and Payments) (Amendment) Regulations (Northern Ireland) 2023
87 (C. 6)	The Justice (Sexual Offences and Trafficking Victims) (2022 Act) (Commencement No.1) Order (Northern Ireland) 2023
88	The Road Races (Cairncastle Hill Climb) Order (Northern Ireland) 2023
89	The Whole of Government Accounts (Designation of Bodies) Order (Northern Ireland) 2023
90	The Universal Credit (Childcare) (Amendment) Regulations (Northern Ireland) 2023
91	The Pensions Dashboards Regulations (Northern Ireland) 2023
92	The Waiting Restrictions (Bellaghy) Order (Northern Ireland) 2023
93	The Social Security, Universal Credit and State Pension (Miscellaneous Amendments) Regulations (Northern Ireland) 2023
94	The Road Races (Loughgall Stages Rally) Order (Northern Ireland) 2023
95	The Planning (General Permitted Development) (Amendment) Order (Northern Ireland) 2023
96	The Social Security (Budgeting Loans) (Electronic Communications) (Amendment) Order (Northern Ireland) 2023
97	The Social Security (Income and Capital Disregards) (Amendment) Regulations (Northern Ireland) 2023
98	The Agriculture (Student Fees) Regulations (Northern Ireland) 2023
99	The Industrial Training Levy (Construction Industry) Order (Northern Ireland) 2023
100	The Circular Road, Larne (Abandonment) Order (Northern Ireland) 2023

== 101 - 200 ==
Number	Title
101	The Roads (Speed Limit) (No. 3) Order (Northern Ireland) 2023
102	The Parking and Waiting Restrictions (Moy) (Amendment) Order (Northern Ireland) 2023
103	The Parking Places on Roads, Loading Bay and Waiting Restrictions (Newcastle) (Amendment) Order (Northern Ireland) 2023
104	The Registered Rents (Increase) Order (Northern Ireland) 2023
105 (C. 7)	The Period Products (Free Provision) (2022 Act) (Commencement No.1) Order (Northern Ireland) 2023
106	The Packaging Waste (Data Reporting) (No. 2) (Amendment) Regulations (Northern Ireland) 2023
107	The Judicial Pensions (Remediable Service etc.) Regulations (Northern Ireland) 2023
108	The Road Races (Down Rally) Order (Northern Ireland) 2023
109	The Road Races (Armoy Motorcycle Road Race) Order (Northern Ireland) 2023
110	The Road Races (Garron Point Hill Climb) Order (Northern Ireland) 2023
111 (C. 8)	The Welfare Reform (Northern Ireland) Order 2015 (Commencement No. 17) Order (Northern Ireland) 2023
112	The Child Support Fees (Revocation) Regulations (Northern Ireland) 2023
113	The Pensions Dashboards (Amendment) Regulations (Northern Ireland) 2023
114	The Grading Inspection of Certified Tourist Establishments (Fees) Regulations (Northern Ireland) 2023
115	The Parking Places on Roads (Motor Cycles) Order (Northern Ireland) 2023
116	The Road Races (Ulster Rally) Order (Northern Ireland) 2023
117	The Occupational Pension Schemes (Collective Money Purchase Schemes) (No. 2) Regulations (Northern Ireland) 2023
118	The Social Security (Infected Blood Capital Disregard) (Amendment) Regulations (Northern Ireland) 2023
119	The Waiting Restrictions (Saintfield) (Amendment) Order (Northern Ireland) 2023
120	The Road Races (Knockagh Hill Climb) Order (Northern Ireland) 2023
121	The Road Races (Bushwhacker Rally) Order (Northern Ireland) 2023
122	The Police Pensions (Remediable Service) Regulations (Northern Ireland) 2023
123	The Taxi Drivers’ Licences (Amendment) Regulations (Northern Ireland) 2023
124	The Motor Vehicles (Driving Licences) (Amendment) (Test Fees) Regulations (Northern Ireland) 2023
125	The Public Service Vehicles (Licence Fees) (Amendment) Regulations (Northern Ireland) 2023
126	The Goods Vehicles (Testing) (Amendment) Regulations (Northern Ireland) 2023
127	The Taxis (Taximeters, Devices and Maximum Fares) (Amendment) Regulations (Northern Ireland) 2023
128	The Taxi Licensing (Amendment) Regulations (Northern Ireland) 2023
129	The Public Service Vehicles Accessibility (Amendment) Regulations (Northern Ireland) 2023
130	The Motor Vehicle Testing (Amendment) (Fees) Regulations (Northern Ireland) 2023
131	The Teachers’ Pension Scheme (Remediable Service) Regulations (Northern Ireland) 2023
132	The Health and Social Care Pension Schemes (Remediable Service) Regulations (Northern Ireland) 2023
133	The Firefighters’ Pensions (Remediable Service) Regulations (Northern Ireland) 2023
134	The Recovery of Health Services Charges (Amounts) (Amendment) Regulations (Northern Ireland) 2023
135	The Marine Protected Areas (Prohibited Methods of Fishing) (Amendment) Regulations (Northern Ireland) 2023
136	The Student Fees (Inflation Index) Regulations (Northern Ireland) 2023
137	The Coronavirus Act 2020 (Registration of Deaths and Still-Births) (Extension) (No.2) Order (Northern Ireland) 2023
138	The Coronavirus Act 2020 (Extension of Provisions Relating to Live Links for Courts and Tribunals) (No.2) Order (Northern Ireland) 2023
139	The Coronavirus Act 2020 (Extension of Powers to Act for the Protection of Public Health) (No. 2) Order (Northern Ireland) 2023
140	The Coronavirus Act 2020 (Extension of Provisions Relating to Local Authority Meetings) (No. 3) Order (Northern Ireland) 2023
141	The Public Service (Civil Servants and Others) Pensions (Remediable Service) Regulations (Northern Ireland) 2023
142 (C. 9)	The Justice (Sexual Offences and Trafficking Victims) (2022 Act) (Commencement No.2) Order (Northern Ireland) 2023
143	The Social Security Benefits Up-rating (No. 2) Order (Northern Ireland) 2023
144	The Mesothelioma Lump Sum Payments (Conditions and Amounts) (Amendment No. 2) Regulations (Northern Ireland) 2023
145	The Social Security Benefits Up-rating (No. 2) Regulations (Northern Ireland) 2023
146	The Occupational Pension Schemes (Governance and Registration) (Amendment No. 2) Regulations (Northern Ireland) 2023
147	The Benefit Cap (Annual Limit) (Amendment No. 2) Regulations (Northern Ireland) 2023
148	The Occupational Pension Schemes (Master Trusts) (No. 2) Regulations (Northern Ireland) 2023
149	The Local Government Pension Scheme (Amendment No. 2) Regulations (Northern Ireland) 2023
150	The Social Security Benefits Up-rating (No. 3) Order (Northern Ireland) 2023
151	The Social Security Benefits Up-rating (No. 3) Regulations (Northern Ireland) 2023
152	The Parking and Waiting Restrictions (Larne) (Amendment) Order (Northern Ireland) 2023
153	The Killinchy Road, Comber (Abandonment) Order (Northern Ireland) 2023
154	The Parking Places (Disabled Persons’ Vehicles) (Amendment No. 5) Order (Northern Ireland) 2023
155	The Statutory Parental Bereavement Pay (General) (No. 2) Regulations (Northern Ireland) 2023
156	The Parental Bereavement Leave (No. 2) Regulations (Northern Ireland) 2023
157	The Parental Bereavement Leave and Pay (Consequential Amendments to Subordinate Legislation) (No. 2) Regulations (Northern Ireland) 2023
158	The Occupational Pension Schemes (Administration, Investment, Charges and Governance) (Amendment No. 2) Regulations (Northern Ireland) 2023
159	The University Road, Belfast (Footway) (Abandonment) Order (Northern Ireland) 2023
160	The Parking and Waiting Restrictions (Londonderry) Order (Northern Ireland) 2023
161	The Waiting Restrictions (Islandmagee) Order (Northern Ireland) 2023
162	The Violent Crime Reduction Act 2006 (Specification for Imitation Firearms) Regulations (Northern Ireland) 2023
163	The Aquatic Animal Health (Amendment) Regulations (Northern Ireland) 2023
164	The Court of Judicature (Non-Contentious Probate) Fees (Amendment) Order (Northern Ireland) 2023
165	The Judgment Enforcement Fees (Amendment) Order (Northern Ireland) 2023
166	The County Court Fees (Amendment) Order (Northern Ireland) 2023
167	The Family Proceedings Fees (Amendment) Order (Northern Ireland) 2023
168	The Motor Vehicles (Construction and Use) (Amendment) Regulations (Northern Ireland) 2023
169	The Court of Judicature Fees (Amendment) Order (Northern Ireland) 2023
170	The Magistrates’ Courts Fees (Amendment) Order (Northern Ireland) 2023
171	The Parking Places (Disabled Persons’ Vehicles) (Amendment No. 6) Order (Northern Ireland) 2023
172	The Parking Places (Disabled Persons’ Vehicles) (Amendment No. 7) Order (Northern Ireland) 2023
173	The Footways (Prohibition of Waiting) Order (Northern Ireland) 2023
174 (C. 10)	The Protection from Stalking (2022 Act) (Commencement) Order (Northern Ireland) 2023
175	The Magistrates’ Courts (Stalking Protection Orders) Rules (Northern Ireland) 2023
176	The Parking Places on Roads and Waiting Restrictions (Magherafelt) (Amendment) Order (Northern Ireland) 2023
177	The B28 Ardress Road, Cranagill, Portadown (Abandonment) Order (Northern Ireland) 2023
178	The Firefighters’ Pension Schemes (Amendment) Regulations (Northern Ireland) 2023
179	The Specified Diseases (Notification) (Amendment) Order (Northern Ireland) 2023
180	The Misuse of Drugs (Amendment) Regulations (Northern Ireland) 2023
181	The Social Security (Iceland) (Liechtenstein) (Norway) Order (Northern Ireland) 2023
182	The Allocation of Housing and Homelessness (Eligibility) (Amendment) (No. 2) Regulations (Northern Ireland) 2023
183	The Producer Responsibility Obligations (Packaging Waste) (Amendment) Regulations (Northern Ireland) 2023
184	The Social Security (Habitual Residence and Past Presence, and Capital Disregards) (Amendment) Regulations (Northern Ireland) 2023
185	The Taxis (Taximeters, Devices and Maximum Fares) (Amendment No. 2) Regulations (Northern Ireland) 2023
186	The Roads (Speed Limit) (No. 4) Order (Northern Ireland) 2023
187	The Parking Places, Loading Bays, Waiting Restrictions and Urban Clearways (Enniskillen) Order (Northern Ireland) 2023
188 (C. 11)	The Justice (Sexual Offences and Trafficking Victims) (2022 Act) (Commencement No.3) Order (Northern Ireland) 2023
189	The Child Support (Management of Payments and Arrears) (Amendment) Regulations (Northern Ireland) 2023
190	The Social Fund Maternity and Funeral Expenses (General) (Amendment) Regulations (Northern Ireland) 2023
191	The Motor Vehicles (Construction and Use) (Amendment No. 2) Regulations (Northern Ireland) 2023
192	The Social Security (Widow’s Benefit and Retirement Pensions) (Amendment) Regulations (Northern Ireland) 2023
193	The Occupational Pensions (Revaluation) Order (Northern Ireland) 2023
194	The State Pension Revaluation for Transitional Pensions Order (Northern Ireland) 2023
195	The State Pension Debits and Credits (Revaluation) Order (Northern Ireland) 2023
196	The Parking and Waiting Restrictions (Carrickfergus) Order (Northern Ireland) 2023
197	The Fair Employment (Specification of Public Authorities) (Amendment) Order (Northern Ireland) 2023
198	The Rates (Localised Flooding) (Emergency Relief) Regulations (Northern Ireland) 2023
199	The Rates (Localised Flooding No.2) (Emergency Relief) Regulations (Northern Ireland) 2023
200	The Areema Drive, Dunmurry (Abandonment) Order (Northern Ireland) 2023

== 201-223 ==
Number	Title
201	The Parking Places on Roads and Waiting Restrictions (Cookstown) (Amendment) Order (Northern Ireland) 2023
202	The Prohibition of U-Turns (Belfast) (Amendment) Order (Northern Ireland) 2023
203	Not Allocated
204	The Parking and Waiting Restrictions (Belfast) (Amendment) Order (Northern Ireland) 2023
205	The Parking Places (Disabled Persons’ Vehicles) (Amendment No. 8) Order (Northern Ireland) 2023
206	The Parking Places (Disabled Persons’ Vehicles) (Amendment No. 9) Order (Northern Ireland) 2023
207	The Parking and Waiting Restrictions (Portadown) (Amendment) Order (Northern Ireland) 2023
208	The Parking Places on Roads and Waiting Restrictions (Dungannon) (Amendment) Order (Northern Ireland) 2023
209	The Pensions Dashboards (No. 2) Regulations (Northern Ireland) 2023
210	The Direct Payments to Farmers (Cross-Compliance) (Amendment) Regulations (Northern Ireland) 2023
211	The Waste (Fees and Charges) (Amendment) Regulations (Northern Ireland) 2023
212	The Beef Carbon Reduction Scheme Regulations (Northern Ireland) 2023
213	The Provision of Health Services to Persons Not Ordinarily Resident (Amendment) Regulations (Northern Ireland) 2023
214	The Parking and Waiting Restrictions (Londonderry) (Amendment) Order (Northern Ireland) 2023
215	The Cycle Routes (Amendment) Order (Northern Ireland) 2023
216	The Prohibition of Traffic (Lay-by on Glenshane Road, Route A6, Maghera) Order (Northern Ireland) 2023
217	The Market Square, Lisburn (Stopping-Up) Order (Northern Ireland) 2023
218	The Misuse of Drugs (Amendment No.2) Regulations (Northern Ireland) 2023
219	The Producer Responsibility Obligations (Packaging Waste) (Amendment No.2) Regulations (Northern Ireland) 2023
220	The Insolvency (Amendment No. 2) Rules (Northern Ireland) 2023
221 (C. 12)	The Pensions Dashboards (Prohibition of Indemnification) Act 2023 (Commencement) Order (Northern Ireland) 2023
222	The Curriculum (Circumstances in which a Pupil may be Excused from Sexual and Reproductive Health and Rights Education) Regulations (Northern Ireland) 2023
223	The Working Time (Amendment) Regulations (Northern Ireland) 2023

== See also ==
- List of acts of the Northern Ireland Assembly from 2023
- List of acts of the Parliament of the United Kingdom from 2023
