= Sidewalk counseling =

Form of anti-abortion activism

Sidewalk counseling, also known as sidewalk interference, is a form of anti-abortion activism conducted outside abortion clinics. Activists seek to communicate with those entering the building, or with passersby in general, in an effort to persuade them not to have an abortion, or to consider their position on the morality of abortion. Common tactics include engaging in conversation, displaying signs, distributing literature, or giving directions to nearby crisis pregnancy centers.

Some anti-abortion organizations offer programs designed to train people in sidewalk counseling. The American Life League publishes "The Sidewalk Counselor's Guidebook" on its website.

The "Chicago Method" is an approach to sidewalk counseling that involves giving those about to enter an abortion facility copies of lawsuits filed against the facility or its physicians. The name comes from the fact that it was first used by Pro-Life Action League in Chicago. Brochures summarizing the lawsuits, scandals, or negative findings of inspection reports can also be used. The intent of the Chicago Method is to dissuade women from obtaining abortion services at the facility.

== Legal restrictions ==
Several jurisdictions in the United States have "buffer zone" laws which limit how close to a clinic protesters can approach. In the 1997 court case, Schenck v. Pro-Choice Network of Western New York, anti-abortion activist Paul Schenck challenged a U.S. district court injunction which restricted demonstrations to within 15-feet of four abortion clinics in New York state. The case came before the Supreme Court, where Justices ruled 8–1 to uphold the constitutionality of a "fixed buffer zone" (the area around the clinic itself), but not that of a "floating buffer zone" (the area around objects in transit such as cars or people).

In 1995, the Access to Abortion Services Act was passed in British Columbia, Canada. It defines "sidewalk interference" as any attempt at "advising or persuading, or attempting to advise or persuade, a person to refrain from making use of abortion services," or "informing or attempting to inform a person concerning issues related to abortion services." It prevents such activities from being carried out within up to 50 metres of an abortion-providing facility. The Safe Access to Abortion Services Act, 2017 in Ontario also prohibits "Advising a person to refrain from accessing abortion services" within a defined buffer zone of up to 150 metres.

Anti-abortion advocates in the U.S. say that sidewalk counseling is a form of free speech protected by the First Amendment of the United States Constitution.

== See also ==
- Freedom of Access to Clinic Entrances Act
- Madsen v. Women's Health Center, Inc.
