= Safe Access to Abortion Services Act, 2017 =

Ontario provincial legislation

Protecting a Woman's Right to Access Abortion Services Act, 2017

Legislative Assembly of Ontario
- Long title: An Act to enact the Safe Access to Abortion Services Act, 2017 and to amend the Freedom of Information and Protection of Privacy Act in relation to abortion services
- Citation: S.O. 2017, c. 19
- Assented to: October 25, 2017

Legislative history
- Bill title: Protecting a Woman's Right to Access Abortion Services Act
- Bill citation: Bill 163
- Introduced by: Yasir Naqvi, Attorney General of Ontario
- First reading: October 4, 2017
- Second reading: October 17, 2017
- Third reading: October 25, 2017
- Status: Current legislation

The Safe Access to Abortion Services Act, 2017 (French: Loi de 2017 sur l'accès sécuritaire aux services d'interruption volontaire de grossesse) is an act of the Legislative Assembly of Ontario relating to the legal protection of access to abortion.

It was enacted under the Protecting a Woman's Right to Access Abortion Services Act, 2017.

== Background ==
The Safe Access to Abortion Services Act, 2017 was modelled on the Access to Abortion Services Act enacted by British Columbia in 1995.

== Legislative passage ==
The only MLA who voted opposing the legislation was Jack MacLaren.

== Provisions ==
The act establishes a safe access zones with a radius of 50 metres around abortion clinics and safe access zones with a radius of 150 metres around the homes of staff.

The protection applies irrespective of whether the facilities provides either surgical or medical abortion, so it applies to pharmacies providing abortion medication.

Facilities must apply for the safe access zone to be implemented.

Those convicted of violating the legislation would be fined CA$5,000 and could face a six-month prison sentence with up to CA$10,000 for multiple offences.

== Further developments ==
In 2018, London Health Sciences Centre said they had no plans to make use of the legislation.
