= Abortion Services (Safe Access Zones) (Scotland) Act 2024 =

Act of the Scottish Parliament

Abortion Services (Safe Access Zones) Act (Scotland) 2024
- Act of the Scottish Parliament
- Scottish Parliament
- Long title: An Act of the Scottish Parliament to create safe access zones around premises that provide treatment for the termination of pregnancy authorised under the Abortion Act 1967.
- Citation: 2024 asp 10
- Introduced by: Gillian Mackay
- Territorial extent: Scotland

Dates
- Royal assent: 22 July 2024

Status: Partly in force

Text of statute as originally enacted

Text of the Abortion Services (Safe Access Zones) (Scotland) Act 2024 as in force today (including any amendments) within the United Kingdom, from legislation.gov.uk.

The Abortion Services (Safe Access Zones) Act (Scotland) 2024 (asp 10) creates safe access zones around abortion clinics in Scotland with a radius of 200 metres.

The Abortion Services (Safe Access Zones) (Scotland) Bill was introduced by Gillian Mackay, Scottish Greens MSP for Central Scotland on 5 October 2023. It received royal assent on 22 July 2024 and became an act of the Scottish Parliament.

== History ==
On 14 April 2022, there was a protest of 100 people outside the Queen Elizabeth University Hospital held by the anti-abortion group 40 Days for Life.

The Northern Ireland Assembly passed similar legislation in 2023: the Abortion Services (Safe Access Zones) Act (Northern Ireland) 2023. The UK Parliament included a section which created safe zones for abortion clinics in the Public Order Act 2023.

The Royal College of Nursing Scotland released a statement in support of the bill in December 2023.

On 25 March 2024, there was a large protest outside the Queen Elizabeth University Hospital.

In April, experts questioned why the law created 200-metre safe access zones rather than 150-metre safe access zones, but Gillian Mackay said she was resisting a change and intended to keep the 200-metre restrictions.

On 22 July 2024, the legislation gained royal assent.

On 14 February 2025, American vice president JD Vance referred to the legislation indirectly during his speech at the Munich Security Conference. Vance included such governmental activity among supposed examples of an internal threat to European democracy. The Scottish government said Vance's comments were incorrect; Mackay said Vance was dispensing "total nonsense and dangerous scaremongering".

On 19 February 2025, a 74 year old woman became the first person arrested under the legislation for holding a sign stating “Coercion is a crime, here to talk, only if you want.” She refused to accept a ‘formal warning’ from the Crown Office and later, in August, the Crown Office decide to take no further action.

== See also ==
- Abortion Services (Safe Access Zones) Act (Northern Ireland) 2023
