= Listening to the Law =

2025 book by Amy Coney Barrett

- Author: Amy Coney Barrett
- Language: English
- Genre: Memoir
- Publisher: Sentinel
- Publication date: September 9, 2025
- Pages: 336
- ISBN: 978-0-593-42186-4
- OCLC: 1517012921

Listening to the Law: Reflections on the Court and Constitution is a 2025 memoir by U.S. Supreme Court justice Amy Coney Barrett, the fifth woman to serve on the Court. Part memoir and part treatise on judicial philosophy, the book offers Barrett's personal reflections on her journey to the Supreme Court, an explanation of how she approaches constitutional interpretation, and an introductory overview of constitutional law.

In the book, Barrett writes about her upbringing, her nomination to the Supreme Court, her daily life as a justice, balancing seven children and a demanding career, her experiences clerking for Justice Antonin Scalia, and the inner workings of the Court's decision-making process. She lays out the core principles of her jurisprudence—judicial restraint, originalism, and textualism—emphasizing that judges should decide cases based on the law's text and original meaning. Barrett goes on to explain her reasoning in a few notable cases, including the 2022 Dobbs v. Jackson Women’s Health Organization decision that overturned Roe v. Wade and Planned Parenthood v. Casey.

Published by an imprint of the Penguin Random House on September 9, 2025, Listening to the Law was released in hardcover and e-book formats, along with an audiobook edition narrated by both Barrett and voice actress January LaVoy. It debuted as a New York Times bestseller, reaching third on the week of September 28, 2025. The book has received mixed-to-positive reviews from critics. Ahead of its publication, Barrett participated in a book tour and media appearances to discuss Listening to the Law.

== Book tour ==
Barrett went on a book tour in the weeks leading up to and following the release of Listening to the Law, partaking in interviews with a variety of journalists and podcasters.

One such interview was with Norah O'Donnell from CBS News, where Barrett discussed the book, reflected on the personal impact of serving on the Supreme Court, and answered questions relating to decisions the Supreme Court had made during the second Trump administration.

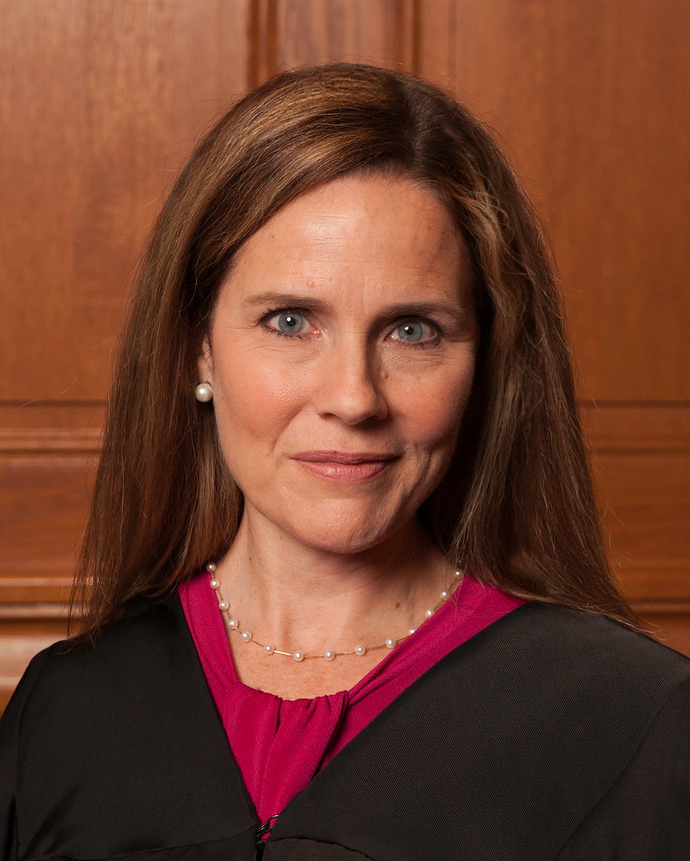
Amy Coney Barrett in 2018. She was a judge for the United States Court of Appeals for the Seventh Circuit at this time.

In October 2025, Barrett discussed Listening to the Law in an extended interview with Ross Douthat on The New York Times’ “Interesting Times” podcast. In the conversation, Barrett reiterated themes from the book. She emphasized that Supreme Court justices should take a long-term view of constitutional doctrine rather than tailoring decisions to contemporary political moments, including the Trump presidency. Barrett also addressed issues such as precedent, executive power, and abortion jurisprudence, framing them as matters of legal doctrine rather than political judgment, while largely declining to comment on pending or potentially upcoming cases. In their discussion on stare decisis, Barrett stated the Court's same-sex marriage decision in Obergefell v. Hodges created “concrete reliance interests,” which she described as the kinds of essential legal and personal expectations that would be “upset or undone if a decision is undone."

== Reception ==
Listening to the Law received a generally mixed-to-positive reception from critics. Many reviewers praised its accessible prose and clear articulation of judicial philosophy, while others criticized its cautious tone and limited engagement with contentious issues.

Writing in The Washington Post, legal scholar Noah Feldman offered a generally positive review, describing the book as “much more” than an introduction to constitutional basics and praising its clear explanation of Barrett's judicial philosophy. He wrote that the book helps explain why Barrett has become both “the decisive vote” and the “center” of the Supreme Court, commended its “unadorned, readable language,” and characterized Barrett as a protégé of the late Justice Antonin Scalia.

Writing in The Wall Street Journal, critic Barton Swaim offered a highly positive review, describing Listening to the Law as “a model of collegiality” and praising Barrett's “sharp and well-organized mind.” He commended the book's clear explanation of the Supreme Court's work and wrote that Barrett's treatment of originalism and textualism was “superb,” characterizing her as a jurist working in the tradition of the late Justice Antonin Scalia.

Writing in The New York Times, non-fiction critic Jennifer Szalai offered a generally critical review, describing Listening to the Law as “studiously bland” and characterizing it as a “controlled performance” marked by restraint and discipline. While acknowledging Barrett's clarity and professionalism, Szalai argued that the book provides limited personal insight and largely avoids engaging with the Supreme Court's most consequential and controversial decisions, including issues such as abortion, presidential power, and the Court's use of its shadow docket.
