= Health (Termination of Pregnancy Services) (Safe Access Zones) Act 2024 =

Irish law

Oireachtas
- Long title: An Act to prohibit persons from engaging in certain conduct in safe access zones, that is to say, in certain areas in and adjacent to certain healthcare premises; to make provision for enforcement in respect of engaging in conduct prohibited in such safe access zones, and to provide for offences in relation to such prohibited conduct; and to provide for matters connected therewith.
- Citation: No. 13 of 2024
- Territorial extent: Ireland
- Passed by: Dáil
- Passed: 15 November
- Passed by: Seanad
- Passed: 1 May 2024
- Signed by: President Michael D. Higgins
- Signed: 7 May 2024

Legislative history

Initiating chamber: Dáil
- Bill title: Health (Termination of Pregnancy Services) (Safe Access Zones) Bill 2023
- Bill citation: No. 54 of 2023
- Introduced by: Minister for Health (Stephen Donnelly)
- Introduced: 29 January 2023
- Committee responsible: Health
- First reading: 5 July 2023
- Second reading: 27 September 2023
- Considered by the Health Committee: 25 October 2023
- Report and Final Stage: 15 November 2023

Revising chamber: Seanad
- Second reading: 14 December 2023
- Considered in committee: 27 February 2024
- Report and Final Stage: 1 May 2024

Final stages
- Seanad amendments considered by the Dáil: 1 May 2024
- Finally passed both chambers: 1 May 2024

Summary
- Creates safe access zones around abortion clinics
- Status: Current legislation

The Health (Termination of Pregnancy Services) (Safe Access Zones) Act 2024 (Act No. 13 of 2024; previously Bill No. 54 of 2023) is an Act of the Oireachtas (Irish parliament) which establishes safe zones around abortion clinics with a radius 100 metres.

== Background ==
Abortion was legalised in 2018 in Ireland through a referendum. Abortion access remained difficult due to harassment, illegal tactics and a culture of shame related to abortion with a number of unregulated services providing false services.

The Dáil passed the bill in November 2023. The Seanad passed the bill in May 2024.

== See also ==
- Abortion Services (Safe Access Zones) Act (Northern Ireland) 2023
