= Abortion Services (Safe Access Zones) Act (Northern Ireland) 2023 =

Safe-zone abortion legislation

- Act of the Northern Ireland Assembly
- Northern Ireland Assembly
- Long title: An Act to make provision in respect of safe access zones for premises providing abortion services.
- Citation: 2023 c. 1 (N.I.)
- Introduced by: Clare Bailey
- Territorial extent: Northern Ireland

Dates
- Royal assent: 6 February 2023
- Commencement: 7 February 2023; 15 April 2024

Status: Current legislation

Text of statute as originally enacted

Text of the Abortion Services (Safe Access Zones) Act (Northern Ireland) 2023 as in force today (including any amendments) within the United Kingdom, from legislation.gov.uk.

The Abortion Services (Safe Access Zones) Act (Northern Ireland) 2023 (c. 1 (N.I.)) received royal assent on 6 February 2023 and creates safe access zones around abortion clinics in Northern Ireland with a radius of 100 metres.

== History ==
In 2020, a report by the NI Abortion and Contraception Taskgroup protest exclusion zones.

In 2021, a majority of Northern Ireland's political parties supported protest exclusion zones.

In 2022, the Northern Ireland Assembly voted in favour of the bill. The Attorney General for Northern Ireland referred it to the Supreme Court, which unanimously ruled that the legislation was compatible with the European Court of Human Rights - it declared that "The right of women in Northern Ireland to access abortion services has now been established in law through the processes of democracy" - and that this legal right should not be obstructed by "opponents of the legislation based, some might think ironically, on the liberal values protected by the convention".

== See also ==
- Abortion Services (Safe Access Zones) (Scotland) Act 2024
- Health (Termination of Pregnancy Services) (Safe Access Zones) Act 2024
