= Notre Dame Law Review =

- Discipline: Law
- Language: English
- Edited by: Jack McEnery

Publication details
- History: 1925-present
- Frequency: 5/year

Standard abbreviations
- Bluebook: Notre Dame L. Rev.
- ISO 4: Notre Dame Law Rev.

Indexing
- ISSN: 0745-3515
- LCCN: 83642997
- OCLC no.: 46998308

Links
- Journal homepage

The Notre Dame Law Review is a law review published by an organization of students at the University of Notre Dame Law School in Indiana.

== History ==
The Notre Dame Law Review was originally founded by a group of students in 1925 as the Notre Dame Lawyer, changing its name after publication of the 81–82 (Vol. 57) volume. It is published by students as an annual volume, each of which consists of 5 separate issues released between October and June corresponding to a single academic year. The Faculty Advisor is Nicole Stelle Garnett.

In 2014 an online publication called the Notre Dame Law Review Online was launched as a supplement to the print edition. The Online publication has taken up hosting its own symposium. In 2019, the online journal was renamed the Notre Dame Law Review Reflection.

== Symposium ==
The Notre Dame Law Review generally hosts an annual symposium dedicated to a particular set of ideas or a specific body of work. These conferences are open to lawyers from outside the Notre Dame Law Faculty. The proceedings of each symposium are published contemporaneously in that year's Law Review. Recent examples of symposia topics are Administrative Lawmaking in the 21st Century (2017), Contemporary Free Speech: The Marketplace of Ideas a Century Later (2018), and Pioneering Research in Empirical Legal Studies: A Symposium in Honor of Professor Margaret Brinig (2019).

== Ranking and impact ==
The Notre Dame Law Review is well regarded among the various rankings of US law reviews. It ranked #24 in a 2024 study by Washington and Lee School of Law based on citation data collected from 2019–2023, #19 in a 2023 study out of the University of Oregon, and #8 among law reviews in Google Scholar's citation metrics of academic publications in law. The Notre Dame Law Review Reflection was ranked #25 among US online law reviews in a 2017 study conducted by the Illinois Law Review.
