= Access to Abortion Services Act =

Canadian provincial law

Legislative Assembly of British Columbia
- Citation: RSBC 1996 c 1
- Royal assent: June 29, 1995
- Commenced: September 18, 1995

Legislative history
- Bill title: 48
- Introduced by: Paul Ramsey, Minister of Health
- First reading: June 19, 1995
- Second reading: June 22, 1995
- Third reading: June 27, 1995
- Status: In force

The Access to Abortion Services Act is a law in the Canadian province of British Columbia enacted in September 1995. It protects access to abortion services by limiting demonstrations outside of abortion clinics, doctor's offices, and doctor's homes. It creates an "access zone" around the facility in which activities such as protesting, sidewalk counseling, intimidation, or physical interference with abortion providers or their patients are prohibited. This distance varies depending upon the building's type, with protests outside of doctor's offices being restricted to coming within 10 metres, up to 50 metres for hospital or clinic, and 160 metres for a doctor's home.

On January 23, 1996, a court overturned the provisions which prohibited protesting and sidewalk counselling on the grounds that both violated the Canadian Charter of Rights and Freedoms. Both provisions were restored in October 1996.

The following cases involve the Access to Abortion Services Act:

- R v. Lewis (1996)
- R. v. Demers (2003)
- Watson v R.; Spratt v R. (2007)

== See also ==
- Abortion
- Abortion in Canada
- Abortion law
