= List of acts of the Northern Ireland Assembly from 2023 =

This is a list of acts of the Northern Ireland Assembly passed in 2023. Acts of the Northern Ireland Assembly are enacted by the Northern Ireland Assembly, which has legislative authority over devolved matters in relation to Northern Ireland under the authority of the Northern Ireland Act 1998. Acts are cited by calendar year, in the same fashion as acts of Parliament of the United Kingdom. Each act passed in a respective year is given a chapter number (abbreviated "c.") denoted by Arabic numerals, and citations are usually followed by the suffix "(N.I.)" so as to prevent confusion with acts of Parliament of the United Kingdom.

1 act of the Northern Ireland Assembly was passed in 2023.

indicates that an act is available to view at legislation.gov.uk, and indicates the location of the original act in the Parliamentary Archives.

== Acts of the Northern Ireland Assembly ==
{{legislationuk|act |- |{{|Abortion Services (Safe Access Zones) Act (Northern Ireland) 2023|ania|1|06-02-2023|maintained=y|archived=n|An Act to make provision in respect of safe access zones for premises providing abortion services.}} }}
