= Paul Schenck =

American Christian minister

- Paul Chaim Schenck
- Born: Paul Chaim Schenck; 1958 (age 67–68); Glen Ridge, New Jersey, U.S.
- Education: Luther Rice University, Holy Apostles College and Seminary, St. Thomas University, Gratz College
- Occupation: Certified clinical chaplain
- Known for: Pastoral counseling, lectures, publications, anti-abortion activism
- Spouse: Rebecca Wald

Paul Chaim Schenck (born 1958) is a Catholic priest, pastoral counselor, and retired clinical chaplain.

== Early life and work ==
Schenck was born in Glen Ridge, New Jersey, to Henry P. Schenck and Marjorie M. Apgar. He has two sisters and an identical twin brother with whom he was raised in Grand Island, New York. His father was born Jewish and his mother converted to Judaism from the Catholic and Anglican (Episcopal) churches. He and his brother attended Hebrew School in nearby Niagara Falls until the sixth grade. He was married in 1977 in an interfaith ceremony in Niagara Falls, New York, presided by Paul Fodor, the Hungarian Holocaust survivor and author. At the time, Schenck was a student in the Institute of Jewish Studies at the State University of New York at Buffalo. Schenck became director of the Empire State Teen Challenge center, a faith-based residential treatment program for persons with "life-controlling problems" such as substance use and abuse, antisocial behaviors, criminal conduct, and relational conflicts. Schenck became a born-again Christian and was baptized at age 16. He was active in evangelical churches until joining the Catholic Church. Admitted to priesthood through the Pastoral Provision of the Catholic Church by Pope Benedict XVI, he is a chaplain with faculties from the Archdiocese for the Military Services.

== Education and experience ==
Schenck graduated from the Luther Rice University in 1984 with a B.A. in biblical studies. He received a Master Certificate in executive leadership from the Mendoza College of Business at the University of Notre Dame. He earned a master's degree in Catholic health care ethics from the Bioethics Institute at Holy Apostles College and Seminary in Cromwell, CT, and received a Master of Science degree in psychology from The Institute for the Psychological Sciences at Divine Mercy University. His Doctor of Education degree is from St. Thomas University, the Archdiocesan University of Florida. He received the Master of Jewish Professional Studies and was granted a certificate of Interfaith Leadership from Gratz College, the historic Jewish college in Philadelphia, PA. Schenck also holds a graduate degree in religious studies from the Catholic International University.

== Professional life ==
Schenck entered the ministry in May, 1982 when he was ordained by the presbytery of the New York District of the Assemblies of God. He had previously held the license to preach with the Elim Fellowship, a revivalist missionary group affiliated with his alma mater, Elim Bible Institute. In 1994 he was admitted to the presbyterate in the Reformed Episcopal Church, in the Anglican Church of North America. In 2005, Fr. Schenck united with the Catholic Church and was ordained a priest by the Most Rev. Victor Galeone, Bishop of St. Augustine (FL) and is endorsed and holds faculties with the Archdiocese for the Military Services. He has been a pastor, Parochial vicar and diocesan Deacon formation director.

Schenck has taught at the Elim Bible College, Lima, New York; the Reformed Episcopal Seminary, Philadelphia; the Thomas More College in Manchester, New Hampshire, and The Pontifical College Josephinum in Columbus, Ohio. In 2019 ProQuest published his research in the experience and operation of empathy based on the theoretical work of Edith Stein, Saint Theresa Benedicta a Croce.

Rev. Paul Schenck retired as a senior chaplain in the U.S. Department of Veterans Affairs. He was appointed pastor of Saint Catherine of Siena parish church in Quarryville, Pennsylvania on April 18, 2026 by the Most Reverend Timothy Senior, Bishop of Harrisburg.

== Works ==
- Neurotheology in Clinical Chaplaincy: A practitioner's handbook. Barnes & Noble Press. 2025.
- Daughter of Israel, Daughter of the Church, The Life and Martyrdom of Edith Stein, Saint Theresa Benedicta of the Cross.
- Spiritual Care for Schizophrenia: An examination of the Biology, Phenomenology, and Spirituality.
- Ten Words That Will Save A Nation, with his brother Rob Schenck
- Constitutions of American Denominations, with Rob Schenck (3 volumes, Hein Law Publishing, 1983)
- Annotated Letter from the Birmingham Jail and Bonhoeffer on Nascent Human Life (National Clergy Council, 1989; 1990)
- A Tyranny of Consensus (Vital Issues Press, 1993)
- The Blackstone Commentaries on the Common Law (4 volumes, Hein Law Publishing, 1994)
- Empathy Towards Persons (ProQuest, 2019)
- Divorce After Conversion (Gratz College/Researchgate, 2020)
- Jeremiah: A Psycho-social Profile (Gratz College/Researchgate, 2020)
- Early American Jewish Personalities (Gratz College/Researchgate, 2021)
- Eastern European Jewish Culture (Gratz College/Researchgate, 2021)
- Who Converted the Great Synagogue into a Movie Theater? (2021, Gratz College/Researchgate)
