= Abortion clinic =

Medical facility which provides resources and procedures to terminate pregnancies

An abortion clinic or abortion provider is a medical facility that provides abortions. Such clinics may be public medical centers, private medical practices or nonprofit organizations such as Planned Parenthood.

== Statistics ==
=== Canada ===
- There were 197 abortion providers in Canada in 2001.
- 34 of the 197 providers in Canada in 2001 were clinics, and 167 were hospitals.
- The provinces with the most providers were Ontario (76 hospitals, 6 clinics), Quebec (30 hospitals, 19 clinics), and British Columbia (37 hospitals, 3 clinics) in 2001.
- The provinces and territories with the fewest providers were Prince Edward Island (none), Nunavut (one hospital), and Yukon (one hospital) in 2001.

=== Netherlands ===
- There were 14 abortion clinics in the Netherlands in 2019.
- In 2013, 92% of all pregnancy terminations were performed in these clinics; the other interventions were carried out by gynaecologists in hospitals.
- In 2017, 30,523 women had their pregnancies terminated in the Netherlands; 11% of abortions were performed on women who travelled to the Netherlands for the treatment.

=== United States ===
- There were 1,603 abortion providers in the United States in 2020.
- 227 of the 1,603 abortion providers in the U.S. in 2020 were clinics wherein the majority of patient visits were for abortions.
- As of 2020, the states with the most clinics were California (173) and New York (104).
- As of 2020, the states with only one clinic were Rhode Island, Missouri, North Dakota, South Dakota, Mississippi, and West Virginia.
- As of 2020, 89% of all counties in the United States did not have a provider.
- Every state (and the District of Columbia) had at least one provider in 2020.

== Clinic access ==
=== Netherlands ===
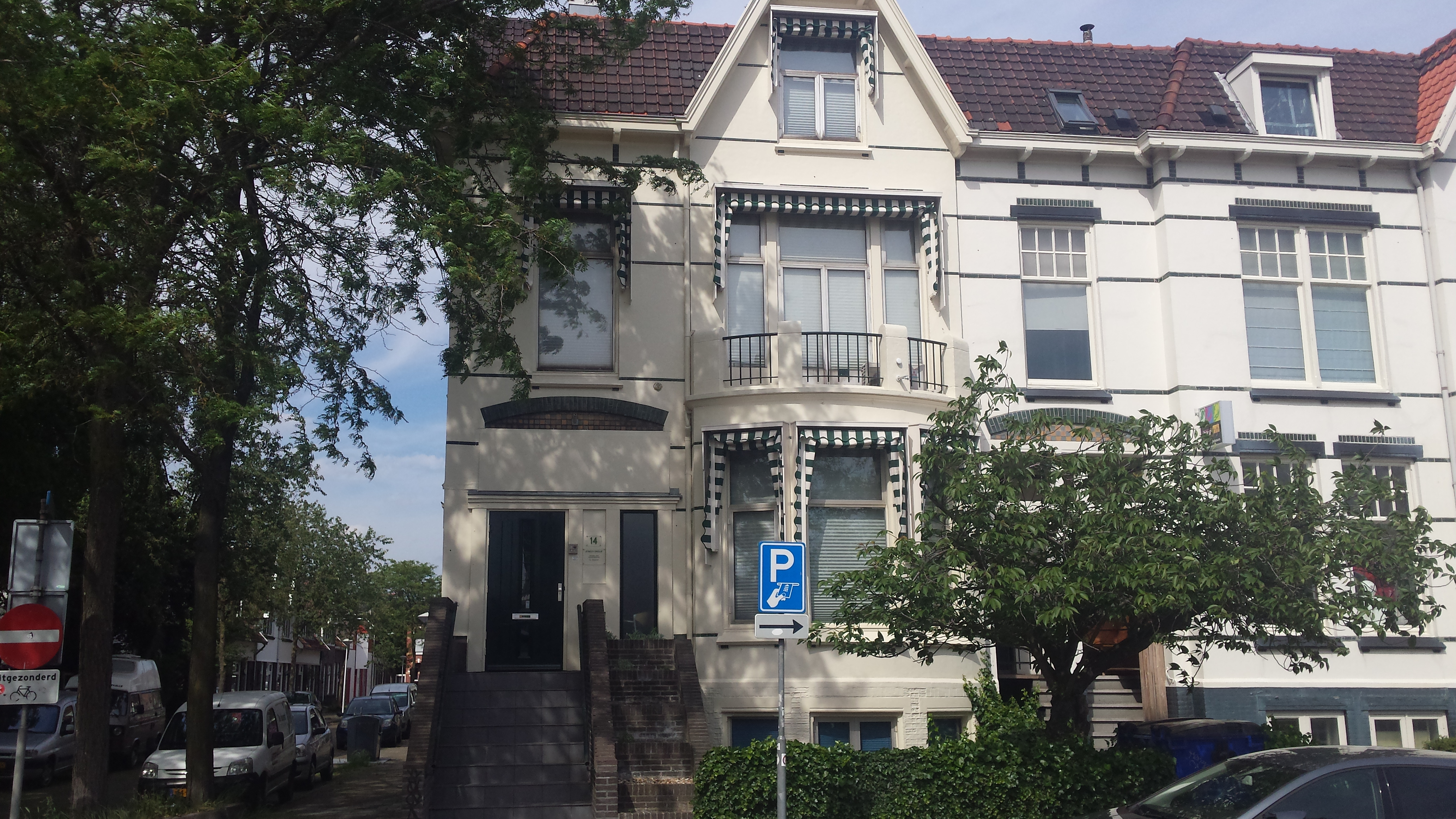
An abortion clinic in Zwolle, Netherlands (2019)

Abortion was criminalised in the Netherlands in 1911; nonetheless, a demand for terminating pregnancies remained, and an illegal abortion market grew. In 1962, about 25,000 abortions were performed in the entire country, all of them illegal and unsafe. 70 amateur abortionists were sentenced that year. Illegal abortions were mostly performed with very risky and dangerous methods, which led to serious infections and internal bleeding. About 20 to 30 women died of complications each year, while many others were disabled for life and resigned to wheelchairs.

In the late 1960s, the taboo on abortion was gradually broken in public discourse. More and more experts came to the point of view that abortions would happen anyway, whether or not the act was criminalised, and it was to conduct them safely for those women determined to end their pregnancy. In the early 1970s, the first specialised abortion clinics emerged, such as in Arnhem (Mildredhuis, 1971) and Heemstede (Bloemenhove Clinic, 1973). By 1975, abortion clinic network Stimezo (an abbreviation of Stichting Medisch Verantwoorde Zwangerschapsonderbreking, "Medically Responsible Pregnancy Termination Foundation," set up in 1969) ran nine clinics throughout the country. The government tolerated these illegal clinics until 1976, when Minister of Justice Dries van Agt tried to close the Bloemenhove Clinic, which was promptly occupied by hundreds of pro-choice activists from numerous women's rights organisations. After a two-week standoff, a judge ruled in favour of the clinic, and Van Agt had to back down from taking the clinic by force. It would take until 1984 when abortion was finally legalised after long-winded, heated parliamentary debates, with high pressure from the supporters and opponents of reproductive rights.

=== United States ===
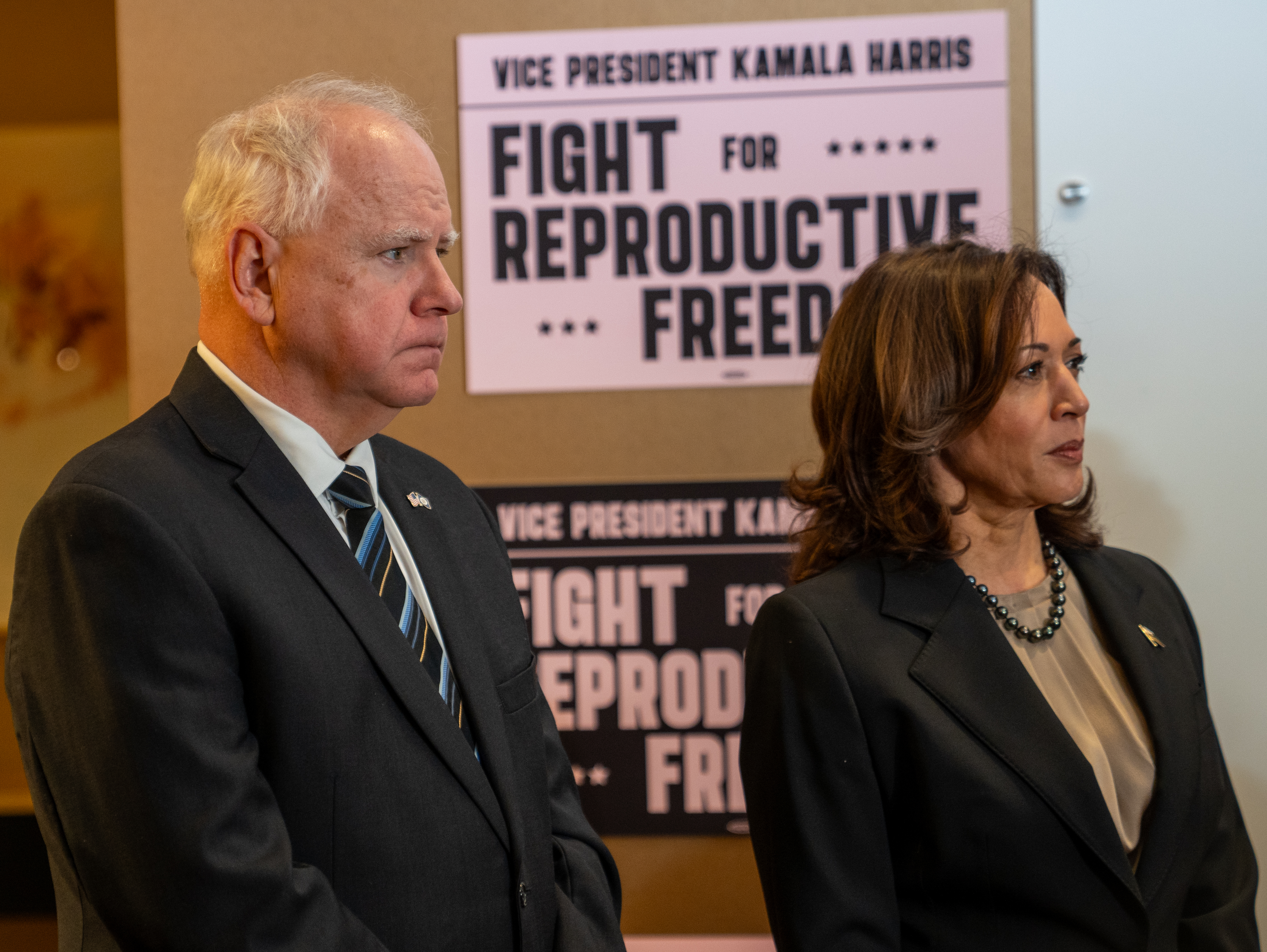
Vice President Harris and Governor Tim Walz visit an abortion clinic in Saint Paul, Minnesota on 14 March 2024

Between 2011 and 2016, 162 abortion clinics in the United States closed or stopped offering abortions due largely to legislative regulations enacted by Republican state lawmakers. These bills, referred to as TRAP laws (Targeted Regulation of Abortion Provider), implement medically unnecessary restrictions for clinics that will be difficult or impossible for providers to meet, therefore forcing clinics to close under the guise of increasing the safety of the procedure.

Access to abortions is extremely limited, particularly in rural and conservative areas. According to the Guttmacher Institute, 31% of women in rural areas traveled over 100 miles in order to receive an abortion, while another 43% traveled between 50 and 100 miles. These distances increase as more clinics are forced to close. Between 2011 and 2016 the number of abortion clinics in Texas dropped from 40 to 19 as a result of the state's House Bill 2, which was struck down by the Supreme Court in June 2016.

The Satanic Temple launched a New Mexico clinic in 2023 named after Samuel Alito's mother, opening a Virginia clinic in 2024, and a Maine clinic in 2025.

== Anti-abortion protests ==
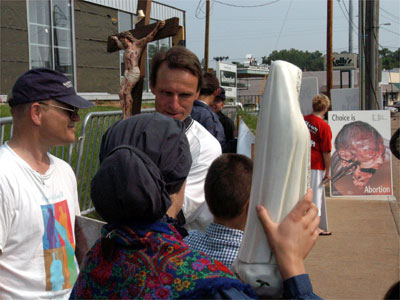
Operation Save America members protest in front of an abortion clinic in Jackson, Mississippi, during their 2006 National Event in that city.

Abortion clinics have often been the site of protests by anti-abortion activists. Protesters often engage in what is known as "sidewalk counseling", in which they warn people entering the clinic about risks of abortion, attempt to offer alternatives to abortion or show pictures of fetuses. In 1985, 85% of abortion providers were experiencing either picketing, clinic blockades or invasion of the facility, with 19% of providers receiving bomb threats and 16% were picketed at their homes. In 2000 82% of facilities received protests with 61% receiving 20 or more pickets.

The 2007 film Juno contains an example of such protest. The protagonist enters a clinic with the purpose of procuring an abortion but sees a fellow student protesting outside the clinic who tells her that the fetus "has fingernails". This causes Juno to change her mind about having an abortion, and she leaves the clinic, with her friend calling out to her, "God appreciates your miracle."

Another tactic in which protestors film or photograph patients entering the clinic utilizes the societal stigma surrounding abortion and attempts to expose or shame women who are seeking the procedure. Anti-abortion activists have also attempted to access abortion clinic medical records by breaking into dumpsters, proposing state legislation that would require clinics to provide information regarding their patients to the government, and hacking online databases containing confidential patient information.

In some countries, a buffer zone is enforced to prevent protesters from standing within a certain distance of the clinic entrance. In the United States these buffer zones have been the subject of many lawsuits and legislative actions on both statewide and national levels. In 2014 the Supreme Court unanimously struck down a Massachusetts bill that had legalized a 35-foot buffer zone around abortion clinics in the state in 2007.

== Anti-abortion violence ==
Abortion clinics have frequently been subject to anti-abortion violence. The New York Times cites over 100 clinic bombings and incidents of arson, over 300 invasions, and over 400 incidents of vandalism between 1978 and 1993, and the National Abortion Federation, an organization of abortion providers, cites over 300 attempted or completed instances of bombing or arson, thousands of invasions and vandalism incidents, as well as other attacks, between 1977 and 2009. According to the NAF, the first instance of arson at an abortion clinic took place in March 1976 in Oregon, and the first bombing was in Ohio in February 1978.

In the United States, the Freedom of Access to Clinic Entrances Act was passed in 1994 in response to acts of violence at clinics, which prohibits the use of force or obstruction to interfere with a person's attempt to obtain or provide reproductive health services and the intentional damage of a reproductive health care facility such as an abortion clinic.

== See also ==
- Center for Reproductive and Sexual Health, once the largest freestanding abortion clinic in the world, opened in New York City after New York legalized abortion in 1970.
- Planned Parenthood

== Sources ==
- Doan, Alesha E. (2007). Opposition and Intimidation:The abortion wars and strategies of political harassment. University of Michigan.
