= Lauren Handy =

American anti-abortion activist

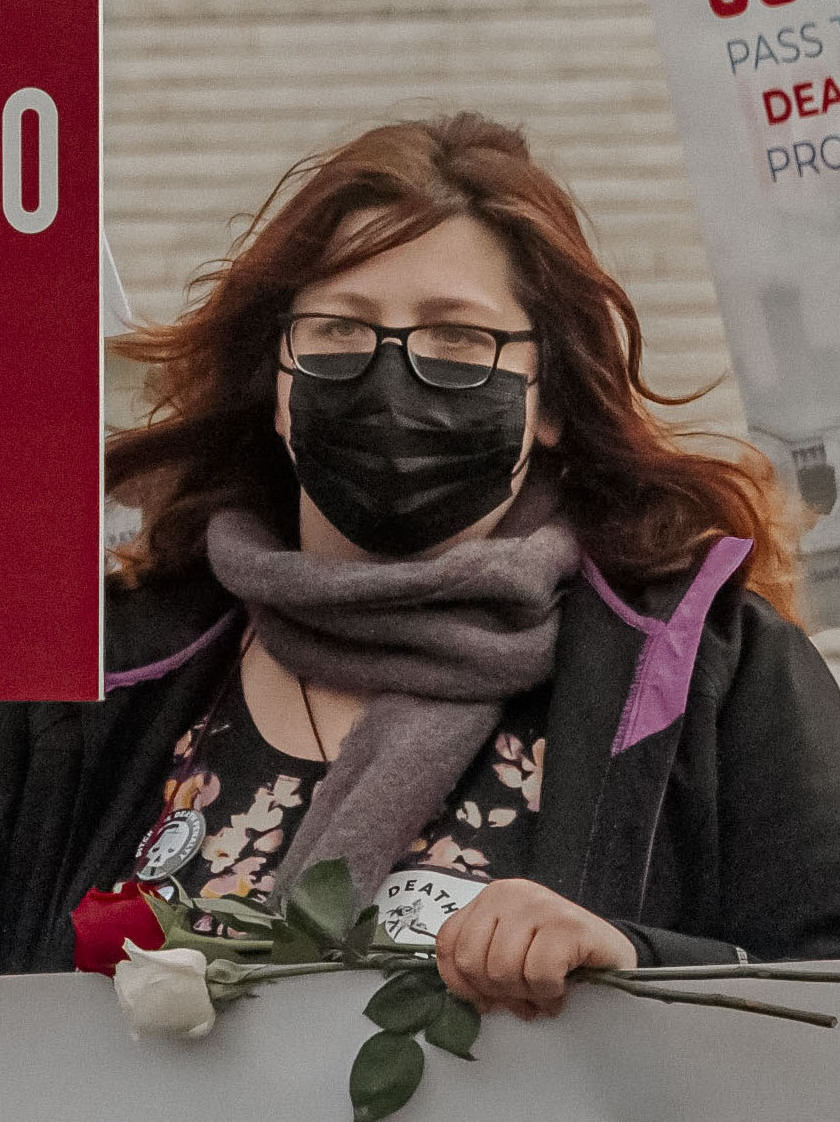
- Handy in 2022 protesting capital punishment
- Education: Central Virginia Community College (attended)
- Criminal information
- Status: Pardoned
- Conviction: Violation of Freedom of Access to Clinic Entrances Act (18 U.S.C. § 248)
- Penalty: 57 months in prison; 3 years of supervised release

Lauren Handy is an American anti-abortion activist. She has been arrested a number of times for her activism, including for violating the FACE Act, which led to time in jail until she was pardoned by Donald Trump. She is the director of activism and mutual aid at the Progressive Anti-Abortion Uprising.

== Life and education ==
Handy grew up as a Southern Baptist. Her father is a painter. She was molested as a child by a non-family member. Handy is a queer convert to Catholicism. As the Catholic Church teaches that sexual acts outside of marriage are sinful, she remains celibate.

She attended Central Virginia Community College with the intent of working in a museum as an art historian. While there, she was both pro-life and agnostic. As she tells it, a student at nearby Liberty University invited her to go sidewalk counseling.

Handy was moved by the experience of seeing women walking into an abortion clinic, and started to attend church several days a week. Six weeks later she skipped her final exams, dropped out of school, sold all her belongings, and moved to California to become a full-time activist with Survivors of the Abortion Holocaust. She has lived with several congregations of the Missionaries of Charity, including one in Haiti, where she worked in a hospice.

== Activism ==
Handy is an anarcho-mutualist, and she opposes abortion and the death penalty. She described her political views as "very far left" and says she does not agree with "the average Democrat or the average liberal," and that she wants to create "trans-inclusive spaces within the pro-life movement." Handy is currently the Director of Activism for the Progressive Anti-Abortion Uprising.

Handy believes abortion is an act of violence, and she therefore wants to interrupt this cycle of violence. Handy claims she does so through employing non-violent principles and tactics, but this perspective was disputed during her trial. Handy has been involved with a number of activist organizations. Handy has been in a leadership role of the Red Rose Rescue movement since its founding. As a sidewalk counselor, Handy employs an LGBT+ inclusive message and has been to more than 100 abortion clinics in more than 32 states.

She claims to have helped over 800 families chose to give birth rather than have an abortion. Handy claims one abortionist sued her for loss of revenue after she helped 12 women find the resources they needed and the women decided not to have abortions. Handy says that when she is arrested that charges are often dropped or sentences suspended. She purposely does not earn wages, so her wages cannot be garnished in a lawsuit. She supports herself with donations and occasional graphic design jobs.

=== Sidewalk counselling ===
Handy began her activism by simply dropping off literature about alternatives to abortion inside abortion clinics. She said she was doing sidewalk counseling for 10 years before she attempted any rescues inside a facility. She also said she has risked trespassing charges by walking onto an abortion facility's parking lot to have a face-to-face conversation and then returning to the sidewalk instead of yelling from 20 feet away. Before her incarceration, Handy stood outside a Washington, D.C., Planned Parenthood facility three or four times a week, telling people that "there is free help available for you and your family."

== Opportunity rescues ==
Handy describes opportunity rescues as "going into the facility, passing out roses, passing out literature, passing out little Christmas gifts if it’s Christmastime, and then leaving before the cops come." She began entering abortion facilities to speak to pregnant women in 2013.

=== 2019 Flint Township incident ===
In 2019, Handy and four others conducted what they called a "pink rose rescue" at the Women's Center of Flint in Flint Township, Michigan. They entered the facility, handed roses to women in the waiting room, and sang songs. When they refused to leave, forcing police to carry them, they were charged with felony resisting arrest, misdemeanor trespass and disturbing the peace. Handy ultimately spent four days in jail.

=== 2021 Alexandria incident ===
In November 2021, Handy and five others entered the waiting room of an Alexandria Women’s Health Clinic. Once inside, they handed pink roses to women who were scheduled to undergo abortions.. They also handed out information on resources available to them and their children, and information on alternatives to abortion. A spokesperson for Handy's Progressive Anti-Abortion Uprising told The Pillar that five women chose not to have abortions as a result of the pink rose rescue. Handy was sentenced to 30 days in jail for trespass.

== 2020 Washington, DC incident ==
On October 22, 2020, Handy made an appointment at a facility performing abortions in Washington, D.C. under a fake name. Once inside, she and four others from the Progressive Anti-Abortion Uprising used their bodies, chains, ropes, and furniture to block the doors. The protest was livestreamed on Facebook. She was not arrested for the action until 18 months later, in March 2022.

On May 14, 2024, Handy was sentenced to 57 months in prison and three years of supervised release for violating the Freedom of Access to Clinic Entrances Act. Her defense lawyer argued that she was only a genuine activist who was simply involved in an act of peaceful, non-violent protest. The prosecution disputed this characterization, using testimony and surveillance footage as evidence. She was represented by lawyers from the Thomas More Society.

One patient testified that she came to the clinic for an abortion because of a diagnosis indicating that her fetus would not survive outside the womb. She testified that she collapsed in pain while her husband begged Handy and her compatriots to let her into the clinic. Surveillance footage was also entered into evidence showing another patient attempting to break in through a window to bypass the blockade, as well as showing a clinic nurse being knocked down into the ground. The nurse sustained a knee sprain when one of Handy’s co-defendants forced his way into the clinic and pushing her.

Judge Colleen Kollar-Kotelly ruled that the "law does not protect violent and obstructive conduct." Kollar-Kotelly did, however, agree with the defense lawyer's argument that Handy was a principled activist and so reduced her sentence from 63–78 months to 57 months plus three years probation, during which she could not come within 1,000 feet of a reproductive health clinic without authorization.

=== Prison ===
She was incarcerated for nine months in a county jail and then seven months at Federal Correctional Institution, Tallahassee. She said she had "many purposeful and meaningful interactions" with others during her time behind bars. While in prison, she said she was "inundated" with people who wanted to tell her their stories about pregnancy loss, either through miscarriage or abortion. When she entered FCI Tallahassee, there were three members of their Catholic group. When she left, that number had grown to 15 or 20 regular attendees. The group had Eucharistic adoration and other services. She was not required to work on feast days. She was also creating an informal RCIA program for other inmates who were interested in learning about the Catholic Church.

On January 23, 2025, President Donald Trump issued a pardon to Handy and her nine co-defendants. She was not expecting to be pardoned and encouraged her family not to get their hopes up before it did. When she heard the news on the radio around 4:00 in the afternoon, she celebrated by using up all the food she had purchased and throwing a party. She then went to bed at 11:00, and was woken up at 11:30, saying she had to be out by midnight. Upon her release, she said she planned to continue working with the Catholic community in the facility. She also agreed to deliver letters others had written to specific Congressmen and said she would advocate on their behalf.

== 2022 fetal remains incident ==
On March 25, 2022, Handy and Terrisa Bukovinac were sidewalk counseling outside of Washington Surgi-Clinic in D.C. when they claim to have seen a medical waste disposal company's truck parked outside. They say they approached the driver and asked if they could give the aborted children inside the boxes a “proper funeral.” Curtis Bay Medical Waste Services has refuted this claim, stating it does not transport fetal remains by company policy and has also denied that any package was ever handed over.

They took the box back to Handy's apartment and, with a deacon present, opened the box with a video camera running. Inside the box they discovered 115 aborted fetuses, including five that were "intact" and which they believed were old enough to be viable outside of the womb. Handy and Bukovinac suspected one fetus may have been born alive and left to die outside the womb, and another was a partial-birth abortion.

This would mean the facility violated the Partial-Birth Abortion Ban Act and the Born-Alive Infants Protection Act. They put what they believed to be the older children into the refrigerator at Handy's house while they tried to find a pathologist, and Handy temporarily moved in with Bukovinac. They then contacted lawyers, priests, and other experts to determine how they should proceed.

Two days later, a Catholic priest said a funeral Mass for the 115 fetuses; each was given a name that was read at the Mass. The bodies were then buried in a cemetery. The pair then hired a lawyer to contact the D.C. Medical Examiner. On March 29, they asked for autopsies to be performed and homicide investigations opened. That evening, Handy left her apartment door unlocked so that police could enter.

On the morning of March 30, when Handy returned to her apartment, she was met by FBI agents and arrested. The arrest was related to the blockade two years prior and unrelated to the fetuses in her apartment. Bukovinac then entered Handy's apartment and found the bodies still there. Later that day, the Washington DC police removed the remains of five fetuses from Handy's apartment with Bukovinac present.

The D.C. Medical Examiner’s Office said the five fetuses recovered from Handy’s home all appear to have been aborted in accordance with D.C. law, and that while there were no plans to conduct an autopsy, an inquiry was ongoing as to the origin of the remains and how they were obtained. Neither Handy nor Bukovinac were ever charged with a crime in relation to the incident, but Handy's landlord terminated her lease. Handy described the incident as traumatic and said it put her "in a very dark period" of her life.

== See also ==
- List of people granted executive clemency in the second Trump presidency
