= Terrisa Bukovinac =

American anti-abortion activist (born 1981)

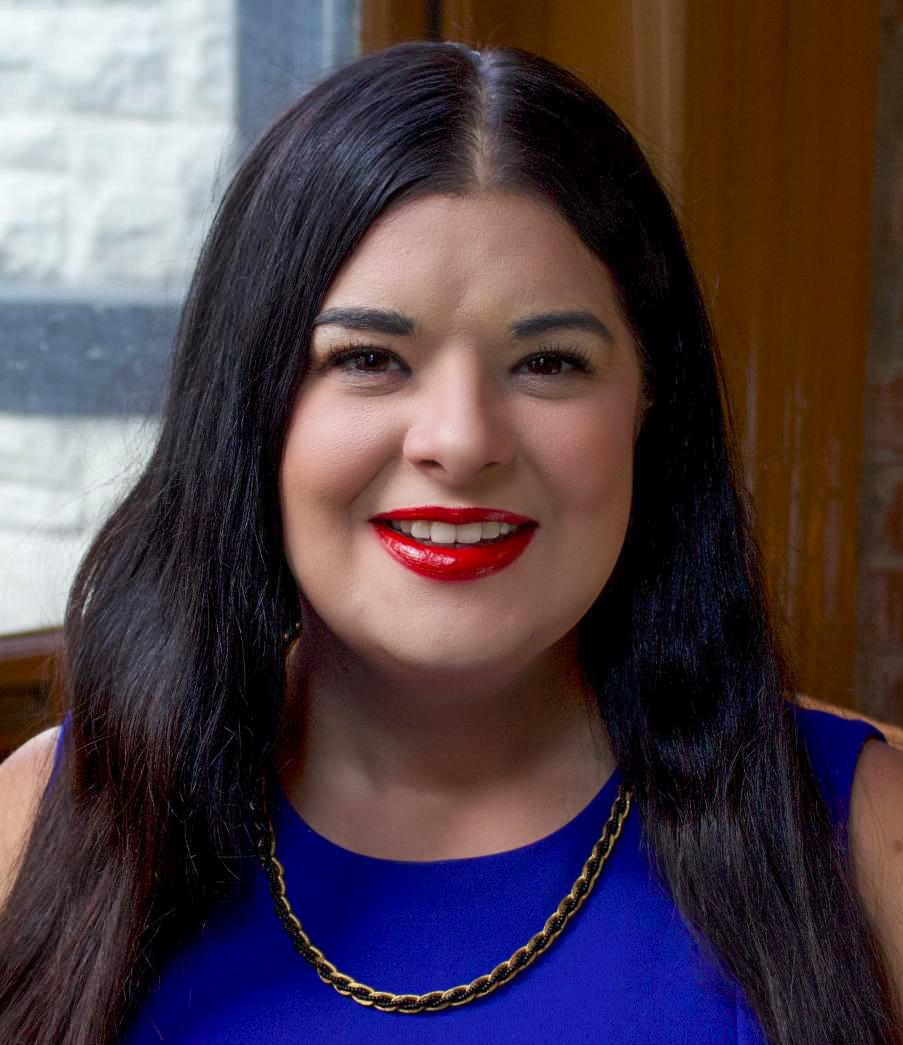
- Official campaign portrait, 2023
- Born: April 4, 1981 (age 45)
- Citizenship: United States
- Occupations: Activist; politician
- Political party: Democratic
- Spouse: Randall Terry (m. 2026)

Terrisa Lin Bukovinac (born April 4, 1981) is an American anti-abortion activist. A member of the Democratic Party, she formerly served as president of Democrats for Life of America and was a candidate for the Democratic nomination for president of the United States in the 2024 New Jersey primary, with the intent of running a campaign to outlaw abortion. She is a subject of the 2022 documentary film Battleground which profiles three leading women in the anti-abortion movement.

== Activism ==
=== 2022 fetal remains incident ===
On March 30, 2022, Washington DC police found the remains of 5 fetuses at the apartment of Lauren Handy, an anti-abortion activist associated with Bukovinac.

Bukovinac and Handy stated that they were among 115 fetuses they had obtained on March 25, 2022 from a medical waste transportation company outside of the Washington Surgi-Clinic. According to Bukovinac, the women went to the clinic to perform what they call a “pink rose rescue” when they noticed a Curtis Bay Medical Waste Services truck outside. The women say they approached the driver of the truck and told him the packages he was transporting might contain fetal remains, and asked if he could hand over one of the boxes. The driver purportedly complied when they informed him they would give the remains "a proper burial and a funeral". Curtis Bay Medical Waste Services has refuted this claim, stating it does not transport fetal remains by company policy and has also denied that any package was ever handed over.

Bukovinac and Handy alleged that inside the box were 110 fetal remains that were the result of first trimester abortions, which were buried in a private cemetery with the help of a Catholic priest, along with the 5 others police had discovered in Handy's apartment. Bukovinac and Handy believed these 5 to be the result of third trimester partial-birth abortions, a procedure outlawed in 2003 by the Partial-Birth Abortion Ban Act. The activists said that their lawyer had asked the police to retrieve the remaining fetuses from Handy's home as evidence of violation of federal law.

While Bukovinac and Handy have called for a full autopsy of the fetuses, the D.C. Medical Examiner’s Office has said the five fetuses recovered from Handy’s home all appear to have been aborted in accordance with D.C. law, and that while there were no plans to conduct an autopsy, an inquiry was ongoing as to the origin of the remains and how they were obtained.

== Political career ==
In 2017, Bukovinac founded Pro-Life San Francisco and became the president of Democrats for Life of America in 2020. The following year, she founded Progressive Anti-Abortion Uprising (PAAU).

Bukovinac announced her presidential candidacy in early September 2023. Her campaign was managed by Catherine Glenn Foster, who was previously president of Americans United for Life and served as council for the Alliance Defending Freedom; both organizations were vital in overturning Roe v. Wade. In relation to her views on abortion, Bukovinac supports a federal abortion ban, defunding Planned Parenthood, repealing the FACE Act and pardoning individuals convicted of crimes related to it, and decreasing costs related to giving birth.

As of December 31, 2023, Bukovinac's campaign had raised more than $28,000.

Bukovinac received 2.7% of the vote with over 14,000 votes in the 2024 New Jersey Democratic presidential primary.

== Political views ==
In addition to her support for the anti-abortion movement, Bukovinac furthermore supports:

- increased parental leave
- personhood for fetuses, under the 14th Amendment

She is a self-described former pro-abortion Christian but now an anti-abortion atheist.
