= List of people granted executive clemency in the second Trump presidency =

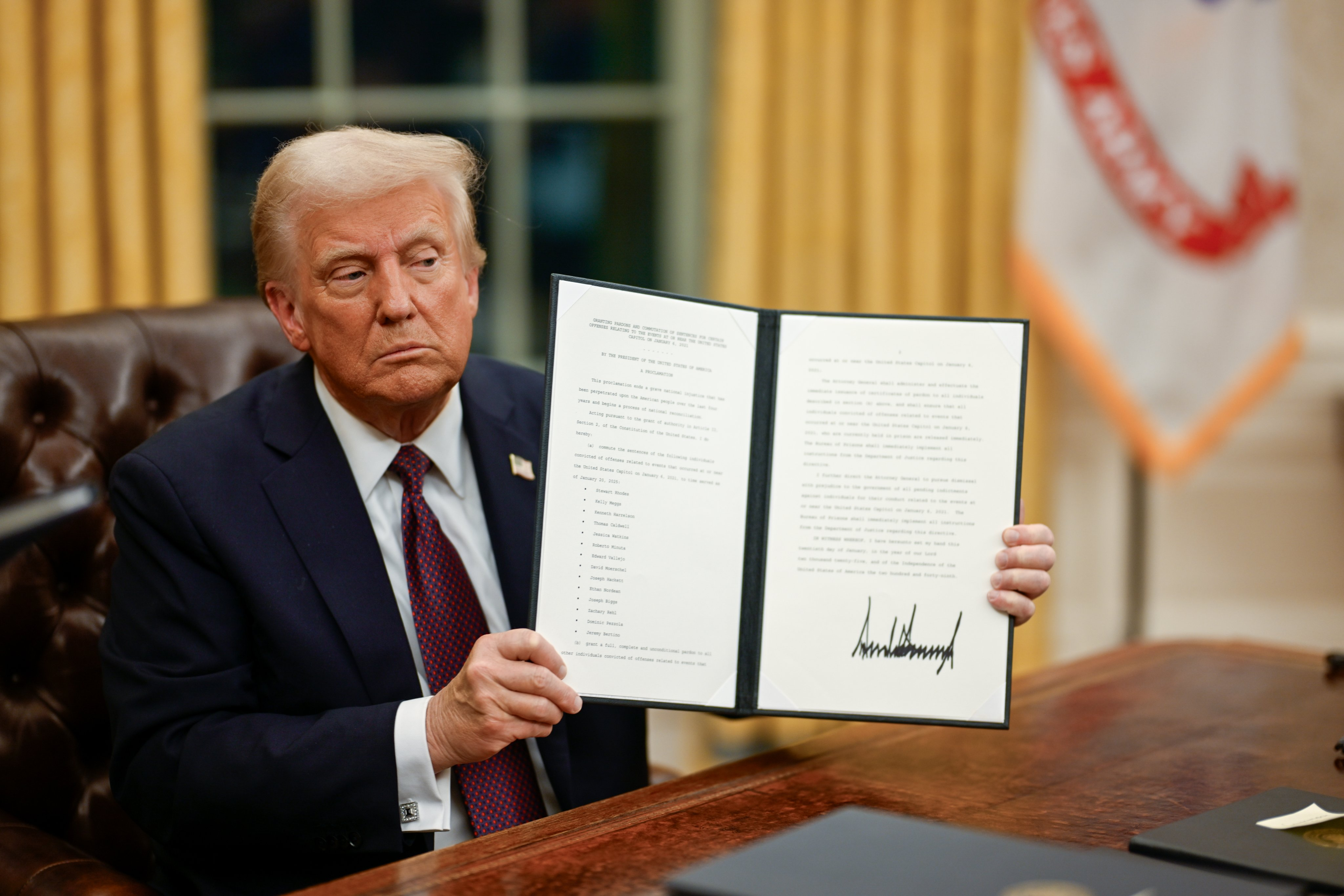
Trump pardoning about 1,500 people convicted of offenses related to the January 6 United States Capitol attack

In his role as the 47th president of the United States (January 20, 2025 – present), Donald Trump granted executive clemency to more than 1,700 individuals as of June 11, 2026, all of whom were charged or convicted of federal criminal offenses. This included a blanket pardon of some 1,500 individuals associated with the January 6 United States Capitol attack. Many of Trump's pardons have gone to people who committed fraud against the government or investors. In many cases, Trump also removed the requirement that these individuals pay restitution and fines, costing their victims an estimated $1.3 billion. At least three individuals who had been convicted in white-collar fraud cases and who were granted executive clemency also had their pending United States Securities and Exchange Commission civil enforcement actions dropped as a result. Unique among modern U.S. presidents, Trump also issued pardons to corporations, erasing $200 million in financial penalties lodged against those companies.

A June 2026 Reuters review of clemency decisions by the second Trump administration found that 96% of clemency grants failed to meet longstanding Department of Justice guidelines for such requests; a large number of pardons were granted to people who used Trump allies to lobby for their cause; and there was evidence of donations to Trump or payments to Trump allies to help achieve the clemency. The nature of the clemency process under the second Trump administration has been controversial among legal experts, ethics experts, and the victims of the pardoned offenders, and a claim many have been "quid pro quo".

== Background ==
The U.S. president's power of clemency arises from Article II of the United States Constitution. Clemency "may take several forms, including pardon, commutation of sentence, remission of fine or restitution, and reprieve", with the two most commonly used forms being a pardon or commutation. A pardon is an official forgiveness for an acknowledged crime. Once a pardon is issued, all further punishment for the crime is waived. The president can only grant pardons for federal offenses. When the president commutes a sentence, it reduces the severity of a sentence without voiding the conviction itself; for example, a commutation may reduce or eliminate a prison term, while leaving other punishments intact. The power of clemency is "one of the most unlimited powers bestowed on the president by the Constitution."

== Trump's second-term use of executive clemency ==
=== Role of the Office of the Pardon Attorney ===
Trump frequently bypassed the Office of the Pardon Attorney, and on March 7, 2025, fired its leader, Department of Justice career attorney Liz Oyer, and installed political loyalist Ed Martin in the role. Ed Martin described the rationale for granting pardons as "No MAGA left behind". In April 2025, Oyer testified to the Senate and accused the Justice Department of "ongoing corruption" and that "the leadership of the Department of Justice appears to value political loyalty above the fair and responsible administration of justice".. On February 2, 2026, it was reported that Martin was considering leaving the Justice Department following conflicts with Todd Blanche, the Deputy Attorney General, though he remained in the role. Following Blanche's confirmation as Attorney General, Trump announced on August 21, 2026, that Martin was leaving the Justice Department. By September of 2026, CBS News reported, the vast majority of successful clemency cases originated outside of the traditional Office of the Pardon Attorney process, but instead came about as a result of personal appeals to the White House.

=== Creation of 'Pardon Czar' position ===
On February 20, 2025, Trump announced the creation of a new position to recommend executive clemency candidates, and named Alice Marie Johnson to the role. Johnson, who had been sentenced to life imprisonment without parole for nonviolent drug offenses, received a sentence commutation and later a full pardon in Trump's first term, after Kim Kardashian intervened on her behalf.

=== Role of lobbyists and donations ===
In addition to pursuing pardons through the Office of Pardon Attorney, the Pardon Czar, and the White House Counsel's Office, some wealthy pardon-seekers have hired politically-connected lobbyists to present their cases directly to Trump, with many echoing claims of political prosecution to win Trump's support. Reflecting concerns about the optics of the pardon process, there have been sporadic attempts by White House staffers to limit access to Trump by advocates for pardon-seekers.

Lobbyists have told the Wall Street Journal and other news outlets that fees of $1M are standard. Some would-be pardon recipients have offered success fees of $6M for a successful application. NBC News reported that former U.S. Attorney Brett Tolman and Washington attorney Adam Katz have played key roles in securing clemency for their clients. Similarly, lobbyist Ches McDowell and Checkpoint Government Systems received $1.3M for obtaining clemency for Changpeng Zhao. Alan Dershowitz was paid at least $500,000 by three brothers convicted for assaults and a long-running sex trafficking scheme. His retainer fees covered a variety of legal services, including clemency advice, and Dershowitz is demanding at least another $250,000 in payments.

Lobbyists Jack Burkman and Jacob Wohl accepted $300,000 to lobby for a pardon for fugitive crypto figure Andean Medjedovic and $960,000 to lobby for a federal pardon on behalf of Joseph Schwartz, convicted for nursing home fraud in April 2025. It was later reported that Schwartz was unhappy with their efforts and hired politically-connected attorney and lobbyist Josh Nass to pursue clemency. Schwartz was granted clemency on November 14, 2025. Nass was later charged with extortion in an apparent connection to the Schwartz pardon; federal prosecutors alleged that Nass hired a convicted racketeer to assault or kidnap Schwartz's son in order to get $500,000 Nass said Schwartz owed him for his pardon work. On July 13, 2026, NOTUS reported that Burkman and Wohl were facing legal action from a former client Boosie Badazz, who alleged that the two took $600,000 to lobby for a promised pardon that never materialized. The lobbying contract specified a $300,000 refund if the effort failed, but Burkman has said the two are "effectively bankrupt."

A related concern has centered on the role of political donations and employment offers in the clemency actions related to the Wanda Vázquez Garced bribery case. Vázquez, a former governor of Puerto Rico, was charged along with banker Julio Herrera Velutini and a second man, along with others, on public corruption charges. Together, they faced sentences up to 20 years in federal prison if convicted on the felony charges. After Herrera's daughter donated $2.5M, and then a further $1M, to Trump's super PAC MAGA Inc., Herrera, Vázquez and third defendant Rossini pleaded guilty to a reduced set of misdemeanor campaign finance charges. Shortly after the charges were reduced, Herrera's daughter pledged another $2.5M to Trump's controversial White House state ballroom renovation project. The New York Times later reported that as the plea deal went through but before clemency was granted, Herrera's daughter started a business entity and hired Alina Habba, then the U.S. Attorney for New Jersey, to serve as the company's general counsel under a $50M pay package. The pardon was granted several weeks after Habba started work and while she was simultaneously serving as a Department of Justice special employee and a senior advisor to then-Attorney General Pam Bondi. Habbi told the Times that Herrera's pardon was unrelated to her work for the new business. When Trump learned about Habba's pay package, he angrily told aides that Habba should turn over a portion of her salary to Trump-associated entities, the New York Times reported. Trump also urged Herrera's daughter to not pay Habba, and in early November 2026 Habba was fired by the business, which claimed that Habba had failed to perform her duties.

=== Legal boundaries of the pardons ===
The scope of the Trump pardons became a contentious legal issue. Several people who were under investigation in the January 6 Capitol assault were charged in separate cases that came about as a result of those investigations. These separate cases included gun charges, possession of child pornography, and threatening FBI agents.

With the mass pardon of the January 6 Capitol assault participants, lawyers for some of those defendants argued that the mass pardons applied to those charges as well, and in several of the cases the Department of Justice attorneys concurred. Some courts accepted this reasoning, but many were skeptical. On November 14, 2025, Department of Justice Pardon Attorney Ed Martin announced additional pardons for two of the people charged in the separate cases.

After the 2025 arrest of Brian Cole Jr. in the pipe bomb attacks on the Democratic National Committee and the Republican National Committee the night before January 6, former DOJ prosecutor Ankush Khardori argued that the broad pardon language may apply to Cole, potentially upending prosecution of Cole. In March 2026, Cole's lawyers made a motion making that exact argument in court. A federal judge later ruled that the pardon did not apply to the case.

=== Pardons of companies ===
Trump was the first president in modern American history to issue pardons for businesses, and by July 2026 had issued nine and wiped out $200 million in penalties, some of which was destined for victims of wrongdoing. According to Bloomberg, White House officials "saw precedent in King Charles II pardoning a company more than 300 years ago", although the White House denied this and said the Constitution said nothing about the pardon being limited to people.

Bloomberg highlighted the case of HDR Global Trading, which owned crypto platform BitMEX and was the first company pardoned instead of a natural person. On January 15, 2025, BitMEX was fined $100 million for violating anti-money laundering laws after pleading guilty in July 2024. That month, the exchange launched a swap listing tied to the $TRUMP memecoin and its founder penned an essay which Bloomberg described as "framing the president's embrace of meme coins as a move toward bolstering political accountability". On March 27, 2025, Trump signed pardons for four BitMEX executives and pardoned the company the same week the $100 million fine was due.

=== Fake electors plot pardons ===
On November 10, 2025, Department of Justice Pardon Attorney Ed Martin announced on social media that 77 people alleged to have been involved in the 2020 Trump fake electors plot had been pardoned via proclamation. None of the listed people were facing federal charges at the time, and the proclamation, known as Proclamation 10989, does not affect state charges.

Building on the scope questions related to the January 6 Capitol assault mass pardon, Proclamation 10989 explicitly states that the clemency action applies to "all United States citizens for conduct relating to the advice, creation, organization, execution, submission, support, voting, activities, participation in, or advocacy for or of any slate or proposed slate of Presidential electors, whether or not recognized by any State or State official, in connection with the 2020 Presidential Election, as well for any conduct relating to their efforts to expose voting fraud and vulnerabilities in the 2020 Presidential Election" and that it is not limited to the 77 people listed by Martin. The proclamation explicitly disallows Trump as a pardon beneficiary, but otherwise delegates questions about to whom it applies to and what activities it covers to the Department of Justice.

Attorneys for a man accused of voter fraud in the 2020 election have argued that the pardon applies to him, even though he is not on the proclamation list. Prosecutors have argued against this interpretation, saying that it is up to the Department of Justice to determine who is eligible for inclusion in the pardon.

=== Former NFL player pardons ===
Shortly after the 2026 Super Bowl, 'Pardon Czar' Alice Marie Johnson announced pardons for five former professional football athletes: Joe Klecko, Nate Newton, Jamal Lewis, Travis Henry and the late Billy Cannon. All had served time and been released after having been convicted on charges ranging from drug dealing to fraud to counterfeiting more than a decade ago.

=== U.S. semiquincentennial pardons ===
In early summer 2026, numerous publications reported that Trump was considering marking the United States Semiquincentennial by issuing 250 pardons. In a scaled-down announcement on July 3 2026, Trump pardoned a number people and businesses convicted of Clean Air Act violations, as well as a GOP donor.

=== Delayed announcement of September 3, 2026 pardons ===
Starting in early September 2026, rumors began circulating that one or more people had been granted clemency, though no official press releases had been issued and the Office of the Pardon Attorney website had not been updated with the clemency documents. A day later, Pardon Czar Alice Johnson announced on social media that 30 people had been granted clemency, but named only four of them. After more questions from the press, the list of 30 recipients was released by the Department of Justice the following week. Former Pardon Attorney Liz Oyer has expressed concern about the delayed announcements and that this may indicate the existence of other, publicly unknown, clemency actions.

=== Major beneficiaries ===
Trump's pardons and grants of clemency favored political allies and loyalists. On January 20, 2025, Trump issued mass pardons and commutations to people who were prosecuted in the January 6 United States Capitol attack. On November 9, 2025, U.S. Pardon Attorney Ed Martin announced that Trump had signed a proclamation granting pardons preempting future federal prosecutions for 77 people associated with the Trump fake electors plot to overturn the results of the 2020 U.S. presidential election. This list included Trump's personal attorney Rudy Giuliani and former chief of staff Mark Meadows.

NBC News analyzed Trump's pardons for 88 individuals granted through January 20, 2026, and found that more than half of them went to wealthy criminals convicted for white-collar crimes such as money laundering and fraud.

In April 2026, The Wall Street Journal reported that Trump had recently said he would "pardon everyone who has come within 200 feet of the Oval Office".

In July 2026, The New York Times reported that Trump had "quietly denied nearly 6,000 clemency applications" from "people who mostly lacked political connections and had waited in queue while he awarded pardons and commutations to allies who had skipped the line".

=== Public reactions to clemency actions ===
In May 2026, CBS News reported that Democrats in both the House and Senate were investigating the pardons and the involvement of "pay-to-play dynamics".

==== Reactions to the January 6 United States Capitol attack clemency actions ====
Trump's pardons and commutations of participants in the January 6 United States Capitol attack were widely condemned by involved officers and police unions. Capitol Police sergeant Aquilino A. Gonell, who was hurt in the attack and retired due to those injuries told the New York Times, "It's a miscarriage of justice, a betrayal, a mockery, and a desecration of the men and women that risked their lives defending our democracy." The International Association of Chiefs of Police and the Fraternal Order of Police issued a joint statement condemning clemency for criminals who assault law enforcement officers, but did not explicitly call out the January 6 actions. Notably, the latter group endorsed Donald Trump in the 2024 US presidential election. The National Association of Police Organizations explicitly condemned the clemency actions for individuals who assaulted law enforcement officers on January 6.

Federal judges who oversaw or were overseeing January 6-related cases also condemned the actions. U.S. District Judge Tanya Chutkan wrote in her dismissal of the charges against January 6 defendant John Banuelo's case that no pardon could change the “tragic truth” of what happened that day: "It cannot whitewash the blood, feces, and terror that the mob left in its wake. And it cannot repair the jagged breach in America's sacred tradition of peacefully transitioning power.”

Some Senate Republicans also condemned the pardons and commutations. James Lankford told CNN, “I think if you attack a police officer that's a very serious issue and they should pay a price for that.” But when Senate Majority leader John Thune was asked about Trump's clemency actions for the January 6 rioters said, “We're looking at the future, not the past.'

==== Reactions to other clemency actions ====
More broadly, The Marshall Project looked at how Trump's second presidency pardon decisions have deviated from the Department of Justice's clemency process as described in the Justice Manual, especially with respect to input from victims, prosecutors, and judges; remorse; and restitution paid. Other analysts and commentators have noted the many white-collar criminals that have benefited from Trump's pardons and commutations. Trump disproportionately pardoned "the powerful, famous, well-connected and wealthy" accused of white-collar crime, which The New York Times described as part of an effort "relegating white-collar offenses to a rank of secondary importance behind violent and property crimes". Some legal observers have specifically called out how Trump's pardon decisions, together with the gutting of relevant federal prosecution units, have undermined public corruption crime-fighting efforts.

In March 2026, Trump announced an anti-fraud task force, led by "fraud czar" JD Vance, and called out recent cases in Minnesota. In ongoing investigations into fraud involving government money in that state, the vast majority of people prosecuted so far are of Somali descent, and Trump has cited that as justification for his violent crackdown on immigrants in general. But critics have noted that in the first year of his second presidency, Trump has granted pardons and commutations to nearly three dozen people prosecuted for fraud. "The war on fraud seems like a war on specific fraud committed by a specific kind of people," former U.S. Pardon Attorney Liz Oyer told the New York Times.

Others have noted that multiple high-level drug kingpins have received pardons, which stands in stark contrast to Trump's tough-on-drugs justifications for military strikes on and sinking of alleged drug boats.

Trump received criticism for pardoning crypto billionaire Changpeng Zhao, whose company Binance entered into a business deal with the Trump family's crypto startup World Liberty Financial. In response to criticism of his pardon, Trump stated "I don't know who he is". On November 16, 2025, CBS News aired an interview Scott Pelley conducted with former Justice Department Pardon Attorney Liz Oyer, in which she said that the pardon process now favored the wealthy, and criticizing the pardon of Zhao in particular.

A 60 Minutes investigative report exposed a cottage industry of "pardon brokers" charging hundreds of thousands to millions of dollars to lobby for presidential pardons outside the traditional Department of Justice process. The investigation found an industry of pardon seeking, that undermined the process and its integrity. The brokers and costs include Lobbyists and right-wing provocateurs like Jack Burkman and Jacob Wohl, who charge clients anywhere from $300,000 to upwards of $3 million to bypass DOJ clemency channels. They sell this by including a pitch, claiming they can leverage close ties to President Donald Trump's inner circle, use political influencers, and mobilize members of Congress to pressure the White House. Rapper Boosie Badazz told correspondent Lesley Stahl that he paid brokers $600,000 upfront after being led to believe it would guarantee a pardon on a gun charge. He never received a pardon and is now suing to get his money back after the brokers refused to honor a contract clause promising a partial refund. At least some of those involved have denied complicity. High-profile figures named by brokers — including House Speaker Mike Johnson, Laura Loomer, Erika Kirk, and Natalie Harp — have denied any involvement or role in securing pardons for clients. The legality of these efforts is grey. While critics and journalists describe the ecosystem as selling access or peddling false hope, investigators noted that lobbying for clemency outside the DOJ framework is not strictly illegal.

== List of recipients of executive clemency from Trump ==
=== Pardons ===
Date of pardon	Name	Court	Sentencing date	Sentence	Offense	Notes
January 20, 2025	1,500+ January 6 defendants	Various	Various (since January 6, 2021)	Various	Sedition, obstruction of an official act, vandalism, etc.	Main article: Pardon of January 6 United States Capitol attack defendants On January 20, 2025, immediately after taking office a second time, Trump granted clemency to every criminal defendant charged, convicted, or sentenced for participation in the January 6 United States Capitol attack—approximately 1,500 defendants. Trump commuted the sentences of 14 people by name (members of the Proud Boys and Oath Keepers who were convicted of seditious conspiracy) and gave "a full, complete and unconditional pardon to all other individuals convicted of offenses related to events that occurred at or near the United States Capitol on January 6, 2021." Those pardoned included those convicted of plotting the attack, as well as those who allegedly attacked police on January 6. Among the most prominent far-right leaders granted clemency by Trump were Enrique Tarrio of the Proud Boys (Trump granted him a pardon, eliminating his 22-year sentence for seditious conspiracy) and Stewart Rhodes (Trump commuted his 18-year sentence to time served); both were immediately released from federal prison.
January 21, 2025	Ross Ulbricht	Southern District of New York	May 29, 2015	2 sentences of life imprisonment plus forty years; $183,961,921 fine, and no chance of parole	Aiding and abetting distribution of drugs over internet, engaging in a continuing criminal enterprise, fraud with identification documents, conspiracy to commit money laundering, conspiracy to commit computer hacking	Also known as "Dread Pirate Roberts", Ulbricht founded the illegal online black market website Silk Road. Trump had previously announced a campaign promise at the 2024 Libertarian National Convention that he would grant a full pardon to Ulbricht. Ulbricht's pardon was supported by the Libertarian and cryptocurrency communities.
January 22, 2025	Andrew Zabavsky	District of Columbia	September 12, 2024	48 months' imprisonment; three years' supervised release	Conspiracy, obstruction of justice, and aiding and abetting	On October 23, 2020, Washington, DC police officers Zabavsky and Sutton were involved in an unauthorized police pursuit that ended in a collision, which caused the death of 20-year-old Karon Hylton-Brown. Both men were ordered to serve three years of supervised release in addition to their prison terms.
January 22, 2025	Terence Dale Sutton Jr.	District of Columbia	September 12, 2024	66 months' imprisonment; three years' supervised release, conditioned upon 100 hours' community service	Murder in second degree, conspiracy, obstruction of justice, and aiding and abetting	On October 23, 2020, Washington, DC police officers Zabavsky and Sutton were involved in an unauthorized police pursuit that ended in a collision, which caused the death of 20-year-old Karon Hylton-Brown. Both men were ordered to serve three years of supervised release in addition to their prison terms.
January 23, 2025	Lauren Handy	District of Columbia	May 14, 2024	57 months' imprisonment, 36 months' supervised release	Conspiracy against rights, violation of the FACE Act	On January 23, 2025, Trump granted pardons to 24 anti-abortion protesters. Among the 24 pardoned were Lauren Handy and 9 of her co-defendants, who were involved in the October 2020 blockade of a Washington, D.C. abortion clinic, and later convicted in violation of the Freedom of Access to Clinic Entrances Act after being arrested in March 2022.
January 23, 2025	Jonathan Darnel	District of Columbia	May 15, 2024	34 months' imprisonment, 36 months' supervised release, conditioned upon 100 hours' community service	Conspiracy against rights, violation of the FACE Act	On January 23, 2025, Trump granted pardons to 24 anti-abortion protesters. Among the 24 pardoned were Lauren Handy and 9 of her co-defendants, who were involved in the October 2020 blockade of a Washington, D.C. abortion clinic, and later convicted in violation of the Freedom of Access to Clinic Entrances Act after being arrested in March 2022.
January 23, 2025	Jay Smith	District of Columbia	August 7, 2023	10 months' imprisonment, 36 months' supervised release	Violation of the FACE Act	On January 23, 2025, Trump granted pardons to 24 anti-abortion protesters. Among the 24 pardoned were Lauren Handy and 9 of her co-defendants, who were involved in the October 2020 blockade of a Washington, D.C. abortion clinic, and later convicted in violation of the Freedom of Access to Clinic Entrances Act after being arrested in March 2022.
January 23, 2025	Paula Paulette Harlow	District of Columbia	May 31, 2024	24 months' imprisonment, 36 months' supervised release	Conspiracy against rights, violation of the FACE Act	On January 23, 2025, Trump granted pardons to 24 anti-abortion protesters. Among the 24 pardoned were Lauren Handy and 9 of her co-defendants, who were involved in the October 2020 blockade of a Washington, D.C. abortion clinic, and later convicted in violation of the Freedom of Access to Clinic Entrances Act after being arrested in March 2022.
January 23, 2025	Jean Marshall	District of Columbia	May 15, 2024	24 months' imprisonment, 36 months' supervised release	Conspiracy against rights, violation of the FACE Act	On January 23, 2025, Trump granted pardons to 24 anti-abortion protesters. Among the 24 pardoned were Lauren Handy and 9 of her co-defendants, who were involved in the October 2020 blockade of a Washington, D.C. abortion clinic, and later convicted in violation of the Freedom of Access to Clinic Entrances Act after being arrested in March 2022.
January 23, 2025	John Hinshaw	District of Columbia	May 14, 2024	21 months' imprisonment, 36 months' supervised release	Conspiracy against rights, violation of the FACE Act	On January 23, 2025, Trump granted pardons to 24 anti-abortion protesters. Among the 24 pardoned were Lauren Handy and 9 of her co-defendants, who were involved in the October 2020 blockade of a Washington, D.C. abortion clinic, and later convicted in violation of the Freedom of Access to Clinic Entrances Act after being arrested in March 2022.
January 23, 2025	Heather Idoni	(1) Middle District of Tennessee; (2) Eastern District of Michigan; (3) District of Columbia	(1) May 22, 2024; (2) N/A; (3) May 22, 2024	(1) 24 months' imprisonment, 36 months' supervised release; (2) N/A; (3) 24 months' imprisonment, 36 months' supervised release	Conspiracy against rights, clinic access obstruction, violation of the FACE Act	On January 23, 2025, Trump granted pardons to 24 anti-abortion protesters. Among the 24 pardoned were Lauren Handy and 9 of her co-defendants, who were involved in the October 2020 blockade of a Washington, D.C. abortion clinic, and later convicted in violation of the Freedom of Access to Clinic Entrances Act after being arrested in March 2022.
January 23, 2025	William Goodman	District of Columbia	May 14, 2024	27 months' imprisonment, 36 months' supervised release	Conspiracy against rights, violation of the FACE Act	On January 23, 2025, Trump granted pardons to 24 anti-abortion protesters. Among the 24 pardoned were Lauren Handy and 9 of her co-defendants, who were involved in the October 2020 blockade of a Washington, D.C. abortion clinic, and later convicted in violation of the Freedom of Access to Clinic Entrances Act after being arrested in March 2022.
January 23, 2025	Joan Bell	District of Columbia	May 14, 2024	27 months' imprisonment, 36 months' supervised release, conditioned upon 100 hours' community service	Conspiracy against rights, violation of the FACE Act	On January 23, 2025, Trump granted pardons to 24 anti-abortion protesters. Among the 24 pardoned were Lauren Handy and 9 of her co-defendants, who were involved in the October 2020 blockade of a Washington, D.C. abortion clinic, and later convicted in violation of the Freedom of Access to Clinic Entrances Act after being arrested in March 2022.
January 23, 2025	Herb Geraghty	District of Columbia	May 15, 2024	27 months' imprisonment, 36 months' supervised release	Conspiracy against rights, violation of the FACE Act	On January 23, 2025, Trump granted pardons to 24 anti-abortion protesters. Among the 24 pardoned were Lauren Handy and 9 of her co-defendants, who were involved in the October 2020 blockade of a Washington, D.C. abortion clinic, and later convicted in violation of the Freedom of Access to Clinic Entrances Act after being arrested in March 2022.
January 23, 2025	Chester Gallagher	(1) Middle District of Tennessee; (2) Eastern District of Michigan	(1) September 26, 2024; (2) N/A	(1) 16 months' imprisonment, three years' supervised release; (2) N/A	(1) Conspiracy to obstruct access to a clinic providing reproductive health services, violation of the FACE Act; (2) Conspiracy against rights, clinic access obstruction	On January 23, 2025, Trump granted pardons to 24 anti-abortion protesters. Among the 24 pardoned were Lauren Handy and 9 of her co-defendants, who were involved in the October 2020 blockade of a Washington, D.C. abortion clinic, and later convicted in violation of the Freedom of Access to Clinic Entrances Act after being arrested in March 2022.
January 23, 2025	Calvin Zastrow	(1) Middle District of Tennessee; (2) Eastern District of Michigan	(1) July 3, 2024; (2) N/A	(1) Six months' imprisonment, three years' supervised release, conditioned upon six months' home confinement; (2) N/A	(1) Conspiracy to obstruct access to a clinic providing reproductive health services, violation of the FACE Act; (2) Conspiracy against rights, clinic access obstruction	On January 23, 2025, Trump granted pardons to 24 anti-abortion protesters. Among the 24 pardoned were Lauren Handy and 9 of her co-defendants, who were involved in the October 2020 blockade of a Washington, D.C. abortion clinic, and later convicted in violation of the Freedom of Access to Clinic Entrances Act after being arrested in March 2022.
January 23, 2025	Coleman Boyd	Middle District of Tennessee	July 3, 2024	Five years' probation, conditioned upon six months' home detention, $10,000 fine (as amended)	Conspiracy to obstruct access to a clinic providing reproductive health services, violation of the FACE Act	On January 23, 2025, Trump granted pardons to 24 anti-abortion protesters. Among the 24 pardoned were Lauren Handy and 9 of her co-defendants, who were involved in the October 2020 blockade of a Washington, D.C. abortion clinic, and later convicted in violation of the Freedom of Access to Clinic Entrances Act after being arrested in March 2022.
January 23, 2025	Caroline Davis	(1) Middle District of Tennessee; (2) Eastern District of Michigan	(1) April 24, 2024; (2) September 18, 2024	(1) Three years' probation; (2) One year's non-reporting probation (concurrent)	(1) Conspiracy to interfere with access to clinic entrances, aiding and abetting interference with access to clinic entrances; (2) Conspiracy, interference with clinic access	On January 23, 2025, Trump granted pardons to 24 anti-abortion protesters. Among the 24 pardoned were Lauren Handy and 9 of her co-defendants, who were involved in the October 2020 blockade of a Washington, D.C. abortion clinic, and later convicted in violation of the Freedom of Access to Clinic Entrances Act after being arrested in March 2022.
January 23, 2025	Paul Vaughn	Middle District of Tennessee	July 2, 2024	Time served, three years' supervised release, conditioned upon six months' home confinement	Conspiracy to obstruct access to a clinic providing reproductive health services, violation of the FACE Act	On January 23, 2025, Trump granted pardons to 24 anti-abortion protesters. Among the 24 pardoned were Lauren Handy and 9 of her co-defendants, who were involved in the October 2020 blockade of a Washington, D.C. abortion clinic, and later convicted in violation of the Freedom of Access to Clinic Entrances Act after being arrested in March 2022.
January 23, 2025	Dennis Green	Middle District of Tennessee	July 3, 2024	Time served, three years' supervised release, conditioned upon six months' home confinement	Conspiracy to obstruct access to a clinic providing reproductive health services, violation of the FACE Act	On January 23, 2025, Trump granted pardons to 24 anti-abortion protesters. Among the 24 pardoned were Lauren Handy and 9 of her co-defendants, who were involved in the October 2020 blockade of a Washington, D.C. abortion clinic, and later convicted in violation of the Freedom of Access to Clinic Entrances Act after being arrested in March 2022.
January 23, 2025	Eva Edl	(1) Middle District of Tennessee; (2) Eastern District of Michigan	(1) September 26, 2024; (2) N/A	(1) Three years' probation (vacated and dismissed); (2) N/A	(1) Violation of the FACE Act; (2) Conspiracy against rights, clinic access obstruction	On January 23, 2025, Trump granted pardons to 24 anti-abortion protesters. Among the 24 pardoned were Lauren Handy and 9 of her co-defendants, who were involved in the October 2020 blockade of a Washington, D.C. abortion clinic, and later convicted in violation of the Freedom of Access to Clinic Entrances Act after being arrested in March 2022.
January 23, 2025	Eva Zastrow	(1) Middle District of Tennessee; (2) Eastern District of Michigan	(1) July 30, 2024; (2) N/A	(1) Three years' probation (vacated and dismissed); (2) N/A	(1) Violation of the FACE Act; (2) Conspiracy against rights, clinic access obstruction	On January 23, 2025, Trump granted pardons to 24 anti-abortion protesters. Among the 24 pardoned were Lauren Handy and 9 of her co-defendants, who were involved in the October 2020 blockade of a Washington, D.C. abortion clinic, and later convicted in violation of the Freedom of Access to Clinic Entrances Act after being arrested in March 2022.
January 23, 2025	James Zastrow	Middle District of Tennessee	July 30, 2024	Three years' probation	Violation of the FACE Act	On January 23, 2025, Trump granted pardons to 24 anti-abortion protesters. Among the 24 pardoned were Lauren Handy and 9 of her co-defendants, who were involved in the October 2020 blockade of a Washington, D.C. abortion clinic, and later convicted in violation of the Freedom of Access to Clinic Entrances Act after being arrested in March 2022.
January 23, 2025	Paul Place	Middle District of Tennessee	July 30, 2024	Three years' probation (vacated and dismissed)	Violation of the FACE Act	On January 23, 2025, Trump granted pardons to 24 anti-abortion protesters. Among the 24 pardoned were Lauren Handy and 9 of her co-defendants, who were involved in the October 2020 blockade of a Washington, D.C. abortion clinic, and later convicted in violation of the Freedom of Access to Clinic Entrances Act after being arrested in March 2022.
January 23, 2025	Joel Curry	Eastern District of Michigan	N/A		Conspiracy against rights, clinic access obstruction	On January 23, 2025, Trump granted pardons to 24 anti-abortion protesters. Among the 24 pardoned were Lauren Handy and 9 of her co-defendants, who were involved in the October 2020 blockade of a Washington, D.C. abortion clinic, and later convicted in violation of the Freedom of Access to Clinic Entrances Act after being arrested in March 2022.
January 23, 2025	Justin Phillips	Eastern District of Michigan	N/A		Conspiracy against rights, clinic access obstruction	On January 23, 2025, Trump granted pardons to 24 anti-abortion protesters. Among the 24 pardoned were Lauren Handy and 9 of her co-defendants, who were involved in the October 2020 blockade of a Washington, D.C. abortion clinic, and later convicted in violation of the Freedom of Access to Clinic Entrances Act after being arrested in March 2022.
January 23, 2025	Bevelyn Beatty Williams	Southern District of New York	July 24, 2024	41 months' imprisonment, two years' supervised release	Violation of the FACE Act	On January 23, 2025, Trump granted pardons to 24 anti-abortion protesters. Among the 24 pardoned were Lauren Handy and 9 of her co-defendants, who were involved in the October 2020 blockade of a Washington, D.C. abortion clinic, and later convicted in violation of the Freedom of Access to Clinic Entrances Act after being arrested in March 2022.
January 23, 2025	Christopher Moscinski	Eastern District of New York	June 27, 2023	Six months' imprisonment, one year's supervised release	Interference with freedom of access to reproductive health services	On January 23, 2025, Trump granted pardons to 24 anti-abortion protesters. Among the 24 pardoned were Lauren Handy and 9 of her co-defendants, who were involved in the October 2020 blockade of a Washington, D.C. abortion clinic, and later convicted in violation of the Freedom of Access to Clinic Entrances Act after being arrested in March 2022.
February 10, 2025	Rod Blagojevich	Northern District of Illinois	December 7, 2011	Fourteen years in prison; two years' supervised release; $20,000 fine	wire fraud (10 counts); conspiracy/attempted extortion (four counts); corrupt solicitation of funds; conspiracy to corruptly solicit funds (two counts); making false statements	Five years after Trump commuted Blagojevich's sentence (see here), he issued him a full pardon in February 2025. Trump's decision to pardon Blagojevich was criticized by U.S. Senator Dick Durbin, Illinois Comptroller Susana Mendoza, and Blagojevich's former lieutenant governor Pat Quinn.
March 11, 2025	Brian Kelsey	Middle District of Tennessee	August 11, 2023	21 months' imprisonment; three years' supervised release	Conspiring to defraud the United States in violation of 18 U.S.C. § 371 and with aiding and abetting the acceptance of excessive campaign contribution in violation of 52 U.S.C. §§ 30116(a)(1)(A), 30116(a)(7)(B)(i), 30116(f), 30109(d)(1)(A)(i) and 18 U.S.C. § 2	The 47-year-old pleaded guilty in November 2022 to charges related to his attempts to funnel campaign money from his state legislative seat toward his failed 2016 congressional bid.
March 20, 2025	Thomas Edward Caldwell	District of Columbia	January 10, 2025	Time served	Tampering with documents or proceedings	Caldwell, a retired Navy intelligence officer, was sentenced on a single count of tampering with evidence for deleting messages following the Capitol attack while his conviction on a second count for obstructing the joint session of Congress was dismissed in 2024 following a ruling by the U.S. Supreme Court narrowing the statute.
March 25, 2025	Devon Archer	Southern District of New York	February 28, 2022	One year and one day's imprisonment; one year's supervised release; $43,427,436 restitution	Conspiracy to commit securities fraud and securities fraud	Archer is a businessman, entrepreneur, investor, and Hunter Biden's former business partner. In 2015, Archer urged the Oglala tribe to issue $60 million of bonds. Archer and his associates used the funds from the bond sale for themselves, instead of investing the money for the benefit of the Oglala community.
March 27, 2025	Trevor Milton	Southern District of New York	December 18, 2023	48 months in prison; three years' supervised release	Securities fraud and wire fraud	The former executive chairman and CEO of Nikola Corporation was convicted at trial for making false and misleading statements to retail investors to drive investor demand. He was sentenced to four years in prison, fined $1 million, and was ordered to repay $661 million in restitution to retail investors. On March 28, 2025, Trump pardoned Milton, who had been appealing his conviction. The pardon ended judicial proceedings seeking hundreds of millions of dollars in restitution for defrauded investors, though he still faces a class-action lawsuit. Asked in a local news interview if he would pay his misled investors back, Milton said he would not, but, "I've got a few big ventures I'm working on right now, I'd definitely be open to helping those people in the future." Milton's attorneys in the case were two lawyers with connections to Trump: Marc Mukasey, who has represented The Trump Organization, and Brad Bondi, brother of Trump U.S. Attorney General appointee Pam Bondi. Milton and his wife had donated $1.8 million to Trump's re-election campaign fund one month before the November 2024 election. When asked by reporters why he pardoned Milton, Trump replied: "They say the thing that he did wrong was he was one of the first people that supported a gentleman named Donald Trump for a president, He supported Trump. He liked Trump.”
March 27, 2025	Arthur Hayes	Southern District of New York	May 20, 2022	Two years' probation, conditioned upon six months' home confinement; $10M fine	Violating the Bank Secrecy Act	In 2022, Hayes, Delo, and Reed, co-founders of the BitMEX global cryptocurrency exchange, and Dwyer, their head of business development, had each pleaded guilty to one count of violating the Bank Secrecy Act by failing to maintain anti-money laundering and know-your-customer programs. They received sentences of probation and were ordered to pay fines. HDR Global Trading Limited, who owned and operated BitMEX was fined $100 million in January 2025 for ignoring U.S. anti-money laundering laws in order to boost revenue.
March 27, 2025	Ben Delo	Southern District of New York	June 15, 2022	30 months' probation; $10M fine	Violating the Bank Secrecy Act	
March 27, 2025	Samuel Reed	Southern District of New York	July 13, 2022	18 months' probation	Violating the Bank Secrecy Act	
March 27, 2025	Gregory Dwyer	Southern District of New York	November 16, 2022	One year's probation, $150,000 fine	Violating the Bank Secrecy Act	
March 27, 2025	HDR Global Trading Limited	Southern District of New York	January 15, 2025	Two years' unsupervised probation, $100,000,000 fine	Violating the Bank Secrecy Act	
April 23, 2025	Michele Fiore	District of Nevada	N/A		Conspiracy to commit wire fraud; wire fraud (six counts)	Fiore, a Nevada Republican politician and justice of the peace, collected over $70,000 in charitable donations to erect a memorial to fallen Las Vegas police officers. She spent all the money on personal and political expenses, including cosmetic surgery and her daughter's wedding. She received her pardon as she was awaiting sentencing. In 2026, Fiore ran again for her old Nye County, Nevada justice of the peace position, while at the same time fighting an investigation by the Nevada Commission on Judicial Discipline into her conduct while on the bench.
April 23, 2025	Paul Walczak	Southern District of Florida	April 11, 2025	18 months' imprisonment; two years' supervised release; $4,381,265.76 restitution	Willful failure to pay trust fund taxes; failure to file return/information	Walczak was convicted for failing to pay Social Security, Medicare, and federal income tax withholding taxes for employees of his health care companies, instead spending the money on personal expenses, including a $2 million yacht. He was sentenced to 18 months in prison and ordered to pay $4.4 million in restitution. His pardon arrived after his mother, Elizabeth Fago, donated $1 million to the MAGA Inc. PAC.
May 27, 2025	Scott Howard Jenkins	Western District of Virginia	March 21, 2025	10 years' imprisonment; three years' supervised release; $600 fine	Conspiracy to commit bribery concerning programs receiving Federal funds, honest services mail fraud, and honest service wire fraud; honest services mail fraud; honest services wire fraud (three counts); bribery concerning programs receiving federal funds (seven counts)	As Sheriff of Culpeper County Jenkins received $75,000 in bribes, as cash and as campaign donations, from numerous individuals who he then appointed as auxiliary deputy sheriffs. The positions come with badges and enhanced gun rights, and in one case was used to restore gun rights to a convicted felon otherwise prohibited from gun ownership. Other auxiliary deputy sheriffs testified that they hoped to use the badges to skip TSA lines and avoid speeding tickets. After Jenkins' pardon was announced, United States Pardon Attorney Ed Martin thanked President Trump on X, saying, "No MAGA Left Behind."
May 27, 2025	James Callahan	District of Columbia	May 28, 2025 (scheduled)	N/A	Filing false labor union reports	As president of the International Union of Operating Engineers, Callahan received at least $315,000 in presents from an advertising firm with which the union did business. Callahan failed to report the kickbacks. He pleaded guilty.
May 28, 2025	Kevin Eric Baisden	District of Columbia Superior Court	September 20, 2010; March 4, 2009; February 5, 2007; December 2, 2005	(1) 90 days' imprisonment (suspended); one year's supervised release; (2) Time served; one year's supervised release; $50 fine; (3) 180 days' imprisonment (suspended); four months' supervised release; $50 fine; (4) 155 days' imprisonment (100 days suspended); one year's supervised release; $50 fine	(1) Shoplifting; (2) Second degree theft; (3) Bail reform act; (4) Second degree theft	An unnamed Trump administration official said that Baisden had committed the offenses while suffering from substance abuse problems, and, now sober, was set to graduate from law school and was seeking state bar admission.
May 28, 2025	Mark Bashaw	U.S. Army	2022	No punishment	Violation of lawful orders	Bashaw, a First Lt. in the U.S. Army, was convicted in a court martial for failure to follow the Army's coronavirus prevention protocols. Bashaw was later separated from the service in 2023 for refusing to get vaccinated against the coronavirus, saying that he will "rely on my God-given immune system." When Bashaw received news of his pardon, he expressed his gratitude to President Trump in a social media post on X and posted an image that included a reference to the debunked conspiracy theory Plandemic.
May 28, 2025	Todd Chrisley	Northern District of Georgia	November 21, 2022	12 years' imprisonment; $17.8 million restitution	Bank fraud and tax evasion	The Chrisleys, principals of a reality television series Chrisley Knows Best, defrauded banks by creating fake documents to obtain $30 million in loans, then later avoiding repayment when Todd declared bankruptcy. Daughter Savannah Chrisley was an advocate for Trump who spoke at the 2024 Republican National Convention. NBC News has reported that the Chrisleys were aided in the pardon process by lobbyist Brett Tolman
May 28, 2025	Julie Chrisley	Northern District of Georgia	November 21, 2022	7 years' imprisonment; $4.7 million restitution	Bank fraud and tax evasion	The Chrisleys, principals of a reality television series Chrisley Knows Best, defrauded banks by creating fake documents to obtain $30 million in loans, then later avoiding repayment when Todd declared bankruptcy. Daughter Savannah Chrisley was an advocate for Trump who spoke at the 2024 Republican National Convention. NBC News has reported that the Chrisleys were aided in the pardon process by lobbyist Brett Tolman
May 28, 2025	Kentrell Gaulden	District of Utah	December 10, 2024	23 months' imprisonment; 5 years' probation; $200,000 fine	Illegal possession of firearms and drug charges	Gaulden, also known as YoungBoy Never Broke Again (NBA YoungBoy), was arrested on federal firearm charges stemming from possession while filming a music video in 2021 in Baton Rouge, Louisiana. Gaulden also admitted to illegally possessing a firearm at his home in Huntsville, Utah.
May 28, 2025	Michael Grimm	Eastern District of New York	July 17, 2015	Eight months' imprisonment; one year's supervised release, conditioned upon 200 hours' community service; $148,907.11 restitution	Aiding and assisting in the preparation of false and fraudulent tax returns	Grimm, a former Republican Congressman and Newsmax commentator, pled guilty of felony tax fraud after being charged for not reporting nearly $1 million in receipts and hundreds of thousands of dollars in employee wages from a Manhattan restaurant he had owned.
May 28, 2025	Michael Harris (Harry O)	Central District of California	November 26, 1990	235 months' imprisonment (commuted to expire on January 19, 2021); five years' supervised release; $80,000 fine	Conspiracy to possess with intent to distribute and to aid and abet possession and distribution of cocaine; aiding and abetting possession with intent to distribute cocaine; possession with intent to distribute cocaine	Harris, co-founder of Death Row Records, had his sentence commuted by Donald Trump in 2021 after serving 33 years in prison. Harris endorsed Donald Trump in the 2024 presidential election and Trump pardoned Harris of his drug crimes in 2025.
May 28, 2025	James Kernan	Northern District of New York	January 25, 2010	Five years' probation, conditioned upon 400 hours' community service; $250,000 fine	Knowingly and willfully permitting a convicted felon to be engaged in the business of insurance	James Kernan, president of a Utica, N.Y., insurance company, was originally indicted along with employee Robert Anderson in early 2008 for selling invalid workers compensation policies. Anderson, who had been previously convicted on unrelated fraud charges, began cooperating with prosecutors. Shortly thereafter, additional fraud charges were filed against James Kernan. His wife, Marlene Kernan, who operated a related insurance company, was also indicted. Eventually both pled guilty to employing a convicted felon in their insurance businesses and were sentenced to probation and a total of $432,708 in fines.
May 28, 2025	Marlene Kernan	Northern District of New York	January 25, 2010	Two years' probation; $182,708 fine	Permitting a convicted felon to engage in the business of insurance	
May 28, 2025	Tanner J. Mansell	Southern District of Florida	February 13, 2023	One year's probation, conditioned upon 50 hours' community service; $3,343.72 restitution	Theft of property within special maritime jurisdiction	On August 10, 2020, two Florida divers Mansell and Moore were involved in stealing fishing gear while rescuing and freeing lemon sharks and a goliath grouper from a shark fishing long-line. The two men testified that they thought the long-line was illegal and reported the gear to state wildlife officials. The line was in fact licensed by NOAA to harvest sharks for research purposes. Their case was championed by the Cato Institute.
May 28, 2025	John R. Moore Jr.	Southern District of Florida	February 13, 2023	One year's probation, conditioned upon 50 hours' community service; $1,000 fine; $3,343.72 restitution	Theft of property within special maritime jurisdiction	On August 10, 2020, two Florida divers Mansell and Moore were involved in stealing fishing gear while rescuing and freeing lemon sharks and a goliath grouper from a shark fishing long-line. The two men testified that they thought the long-line was illegal and reported the gear to state wildlife officials. The line was in fact licensed by NOAA to harvest sharks for research purposes. Their case was championed by the Cato Institute.
May 28, 2025	John Rowland	District of Connecticut	March 18, 2005; March 18, 2015	(1) 12 months and one day's imprisonment; three years' supervised release, conditioned upon four months' home confinement and 300 hours' community service; $82,000 fine; (2) 30 months' imprisonment; three years' supervised release $35,000 fine	(1) Conspiracy to defraud the United States; (2) Falsification of records in a federal investigation; conspiracy; causing false statements (two counts); illegal campaign contributions (two counts)	Rowland, formerly a Republican Governor of Connecticut, pled guilty to corruption charges stemming from illegal gifts from state contractors. He served ten months in federal prison. After leaving prison, he became a talk radio host, but was later convicted by a jury on seven new charges arising from campaign finance law violations, and served another 30 months in federal prison.
May 28, 2025	Charles Overton Scott	Northern District of Ohio	February 12, 2025	42 months' imprisonment; two years' supervised release; $5,000 fine; $500,000 restitution	Conspiracy to commit securities fraud; securities fraud	Scott was convicted for conspiring with the CEO of US Lighting Group Inc. and others in a pump-and-dump scheme.
May 28, 2025	P.G. Sittenfeld	Southern District of Ohio	October 10, 2023	16 months' imprisonment; one year's supervised release; $40,000 fine	Bribery concerning programs receiving federal funds; attempted extortion under color of official right	Sittenfeld was a Cincinnati City Council member who was convicted of accepting bribes from undercover FBI agents posing as real estate developers. After his conviction, Sittenfeld had taken his case to the federal appeals court, where he lost his case again. At the time of his pardon, he was appealing that appeals court decision. In April 2026, the U.S. Supreme Court threw out the federal appeals court conviction in light of the pardon.
May 28, 2025	Earl Lamont Smith	Northern District of Georgia	March 24, 2010	18 months' imprisonment; three years' supervised release; $163,330 restitution	Theft of government property	Smith was one of three U.S. Army Reservists convicted of stealing thousands of computers from the U.S. government and reselling them. The three were prosecuted by then-United States Attorney for the Northern District of Georgia Sally Yates.
May 28, 2025	Charles Lavar Tanner	Northern District of Indiana	May 26, 2009	360 months' imprisonment (as amended) (commuted to expire on October 21, 2020); 10 years' supervised release; $1,000 fine	Conspiracy to possess with intent to distribute five kilograms or more of cocaine; attempt to possess with intent to distribute five kilograms or more of cocaine	
May 29, 2025	Jeremy Young Hutchinson	(1/2) Eastern District of Arkansas; (3) Western District of Missouri	(1/2) February 3, 2023; (3) April 23, 2023	(1) 18 months' imprisonment; three years' supervised release; $224,497.10 restitution; (2) 28 months' imprisonment (consecutive); three years' supervised release (concurrent); $131,038 restitution; (3) 50 months' imprisonment (consecutive); three years' supervised release	(1) Conspiracy to commit bribery; (2) Aiding and abetting filing of false income tax return; (3) Conspiracy; criminal forfeiture of property	Hutchinson, an Arkansas state senator and son of former U.S. Senator Tim Hutchinson, was convicted in a public corruption scheme.
October 21, 2025	Changpeng Zhao	Western District of Washington	April 30, 2024	Four months' imprisonment; $50,000,000 fine	Failure to maintain an effective anti-money laundering program	Binance, the cryptocurrency company Zhao founded and remains the majority owner of, recently entered into business with the Trump family's crypto startup, World Liberty Financial. Zhao himself hired lobbyists with close ties to the Trump family to pursue his clemency case.
November 7, 2025	Glen Casada	Middle District of Tennessee	September 24, 2025	36 months' imprisonment	Seventeen charges including wire fraud and money laundering	Casada is a former GOP speaker of the Tennessee House. Cothren was a wone-time top aid to Casada. Both were convicted in a kickback scheme involving a taxpayer-funded mail order business they operated under false names.
November 7, 2025	Cade Cothren	Middle District of Tennessee	September 17, 2025	30 months' imprisonment; $25,000 in restitution; 12 months' probation	Nineteen charges including wire fraud and money laundering	Casada is a former GOP speaker of the Tennessee House. Cothren was a wone-time top aid to Casada. Both were convicted in a kickback scheme involving a taxpayer-funded mail order business they operated under false names.
November 7, 2025	Robert Henry Harshbarger Jr.	District of Kansas	November 4, 2013	48 months' imprisonment; $25,000 fine; $848,504.34 restitution	Introducing misbranded drugs into Interstate commerce; health care fraud	Harshbarger, a pharmacist, was convicted of misrepresenting unapproved, cheaper medications from China as approved kidney dialysis drugs for his patients. He is the husband of U.S. Representative Diana Harshbarger.
November 7, 2025	Troy Lake	District of Colorado	December 5, 2024	12 months and one day's imprisonment; $2,500 fine	Conspiracy to violate the Clean Air Act	Lake pleaded guilty to conspiring to violate the Clean Air Act by disabling the monitoring components of the emissions control systems on hundreds of heavy-duty commercial trucks throughout the country. Eight co-conspirators located in seven different states had previously been sentenced for their role in the conspiracy.
November 7, 2025	Michael McMahon	Eastern District of New York	April 16, 2025	18 months imprisonment	Acting as an illegal foreign agent, stalking, and others	McMahon, a private investigator and former NYPD officer, was hired as part of China's Operation Fox Hunt to locate a former Chinese official living in New Jersey. He claimed he was deceived by his clients and was unaware that the Chinese government was involved. He received support from representatives Mike Lawler and Pete Sessions.
November 7, 2025	Darryl Strawberry Sr.	Eastern District of New York	April 4, 1995	Three years' probation, conditioned upon six months' home confinement and 100 hours' community service	Income tax evasion	
November 7, 2025	Michelino Sunseri	District of Wyoming	N/A (Note: Sunseri was pardoned before his sentencing.)	N/A	Violation of 36 CFR § 2.1(b): failure to comply with restrictions regarding "hiking or pedestrian use" of trails	Sunseri, an ultrarunner, broke the speed record for Grand Teton in Grand Teton National Park—this was later disavowed by the record-keeping authorities. In doing so, he used a restricted trail in violation of a federal regulation regarding the National Park Service; and was found guilty in September 2025, despite legal aid from the Pacific Legal Foundation. Prior to his sentencing in mid-November, he was pardoned; in publicizing his pardon on Facebook, he called the case "a massive waste of taxpayer money and government energy from the start," as others had used the trail, too.
November 9, 2025	Mark Amick					Amick was preemptively pardoned in a presidential proclamation announced November 9, 2025, for conduct relating to the Trump fake electors plot.
November 9, 2025	Kathy Berden					Berden was preemptively pardoned in a presidential proclamation announced November 9, 2025, for conduct relating to the Trump fake electors plot.
November 9, 2025	Christina Bobb					Bobb was preemptively pardoned in a presidential proclamation announced November 9, 2025, for conduct relating to the Trump fake electors plot.
November 9, 2025	Tyler Bowyer					Bowyer was preemptively pardoned in a presidential proclamation announced November 9, 2025, for conduct relating to the Trump fake electors plot.
November 9, 2025	Joseph Brannan					Brannan was preemptively pardoned in a presidential proclamation announced November 9, 2025, for conduct relating to the Trump fake electors plot.
November 9, 2025	Carol Brunner					Brunner was preemptively pardoned in a presidential proclamation announced November 9, 2025, for conduct relating to the Trump fake electors plot.
November 9, 2025	Mary Buestrin					Buestrin was preemptively pardoned in a presidential proclamation announced November 9, 2025, for conduct relating to the Trump fake electors plot.
November 9, 2025	Darryl Carlson					Carlson was preemptively pardoned in a presidential proclamation announced November 9, 2025, for conduct relating to the Trump fake electors plot.
November 9, 2025	James "Ken" Carroll					Carroll was preemptively pardoned in a presidential proclamation announced November 9, 2025, for conduct relating to the Trump fake electors plot.
November 9, 2025	Brad Carver					Carver was preemptively pardoned in a presidential proclamation announced November 9, 2025, for conduct relating to the Trump fake electors plot.
November 9, 2025	Robert Cheeley					Cheeley was preemptively pardoned in a presidential proclamation announced November 9, 2025, for conduct relating to the Trump fake electors plot.
November 9, 2025	Kenneth Chesebro					Chesebro was preemptively pardoned in a presidential proclamation announced November 9, 2025, for conduct relating to the Trump fake electors plot.
November 9, 2025	Hank Choate					Choate was preemptively pardoned in a presidential proclamation announced November 9, 2025, for conduct relating to the Trump fake electors plot.
November 9, 2025	Jeffrey Clark					Clark was preemptively pardoned in a presidential proclamation announced November 9, 2025, for conduct relating to the Trump fake electors plot.
November 9, 2025	Vikki Consiglio					Consiglio was preemptively pardoned in a presidential proclamation announced November 9, 2025, for conduct relating to the Trump fake electors plot.
November 9, 2025	Nancy Cottle					Cottle was preemptively pardoned in a presidential proclamation announced November 9, 2025, for conduct relating to the Trump fake electors plot.
November 9, 2025	James DeGraffenreid					DeGraffenreid was preemptively pardoned in a presidential proclamation announced November 9, 2025, for conduct relating to the Trump fake electors plot.
November 9, 2025	John Downey					Downey was preemptively pardoned in a presidential proclamation announced November 9, 2025, for conduct relating to the Trump fake electors plot.
November 9, 2025	John Eastman					Eastman was preemptively pardoned in a presidential proclamation announced November 9, 2025, for conduct relating to the Trump fake electors plot.
November 9, 2025	Jenna Ellis					Ellis was preemptively pardoned in a presidential proclamation announced November 9, 2025, for conduct relating to the Trump fake electors plot.
November 9, 2025	Boris Epshteyn					Epshteyn was preemptively pardoned in a presidential proclamation announced November 9, 2025, for conduct relating to the Trump fake electors plot.
November 9, 2025	Amy Facchinello					Facchinello was preemptively pardoned in a presidential proclamation announced November 9, 2025, for conduct relating to the Trump fake electors plot.
November 9, 2025	Bill Feehan					Feehan was preemptively pardoned in a presidential proclamation announced November 9, 2025, for conduct relating to the Trump fake electors plot.
November 9, 2025	Carolyn Fisher					Fisher was preemptively pardoned in a presidential proclamation announced November 9, 2025, for conduct relating to the Trump fake electors plot.
November 9, 2025	Harrison Floyd					Floyd was preemptively pardoned in a presidential proclamation announced November 9, 2025, for conduct relating to the Trump fake electors plot.
November 9, 2025	Clifford Frost					Frost was preemptively pardoned in a presidential proclamation announced November 9, 2025, for conduct relating to the Trump fake electors plot.
November 9, 2025	Kay Godwin					Godwin was preemptively pardoned in a presidential proclamation announced November 9, 2025, for conduct relating to the Trump fake electors plot.
November 9, 2025	Edward Scott Grabins					Grabins was preemptively pardoned in a presidential proclamation announced November 9, 2025, for conduct relating to the Trump fake electors plot.
November 9, 2025	Stanley Grot					Grot was preemptively pardoned in a presidential proclamation announced November 9, 2025, for conduct relating to the Trump fake electors plot.
November 9, 2025	Rudy Giuliani					Giuliani was preemptively pardoned in a presidential proclamation announced November 9, 2025, for conduct relating to the Trump fake electors plot.
November 9, 2025	John Haggard					Posthumous pardon. Haggard was preemptively pardoned in a presidential proclamation announced November 9, 2025, for conduct relating to the Trump fake electors plot.
November 9, 2025	Scott Hall					Hall was preemptively pardoned in a presidential proclamation announced November 9, 2025, for conduct relating to the Trump fake electors plot.
November 9, 2025	Misty Hampton					Hampton was preemptively pardoned in a presidential proclamation announced November 9, 2025, for conduct relating to the Trump fake electors plot.
November 9, 2025	David G. Hanna					Hanna was preemptively pardoned in a presidential proclamation announced November 9, 2025, for conduct relating to the Trump fake electors plot.
November 9, 2025	Mark Hennessy					Hennessy was preemptively pardoned in a presidential proclamation announced November 9, 2025, for conduct relating to the Trump fake electors plot.
November 9, 2025	Mari-Ann Henry					Henry was preemptively pardoned in a presidential proclamation announced November 9, 2025, for conduct relating to the Trump fake electors plot.
November 9, 2025	Durward James Hindle III					Hindle was preemptively pardoned in a presidential proclamation announced November 9, 2025, for conduct relating to the Trump fake electors plot.
November 9, 2025	Andrew Hitt					Hitt was preemptively pardoned in a presidential proclamation announced November 9, 2025, for conduct relating to the Trump fake electors plot.
November 9, 2025	Jake Hoffman					Hoffman was preemptively pardoned in a presidential proclamation announced November 9, 2025, for conduct relating to the Trump fake electors plot.
November 9, 2025	Burt Jones					Jones was preemptively pardoned in a presidential proclamation announced November 9, 2025, for conduct relating to the Trump fake electors plot.
November 9, 2025	Anthony T. Kern					Kern was preemptively pardoned in a presidential proclamation announced November 9, 2025, for conduct relating to the Trump fake electors plot.
November 9, 2025	Kathy Kiernen					Kiernen was preemptively pardoned in a presidential proclamation announced November 9, 2025, for conduct relating to the Trump fake electors plot.
November 9, 2025	Timothy King					King was preemptively pardoned in a presidential proclamation announced November 9, 2025, for conduct relating to the Trump fake electors plot.
November 9, 2025	Trevian Kutti					Kutti was preemptively pardoned in a presidential proclamation announced November 9, 2025, for conduct relating to the Trump fake electors plot.
November 9, 2025	James Lamon					Lamon was preemptively pardoned in a presidential proclamation announced November 9, 2025, for conduct relating to the Trump fake electors plot.
November 9, 2025	Cathleen Latham					Latham was preemptively pardoned in a presidential proclamation announced November 9, 2025, for conduct relating to the Trump fake electors plot.
November 9, 2025	Jesse Law					Law was preemptively pardoned in a presidential proclamation announced November 9, 2025, for conduct relating to the Trump fake electors plot.
November 9, 2025	Stephen Lee					Lee was preemptively pardoned in a presidential proclamation announced November 9, 2025, for conduct relating to the Trump fake electors plot.
November 9, 2025	Michele Lundgren					Lundgren was preemptively pardoned in a presidential proclamation announced November 9, 2025, for conduct relating to the Trump fake electors plot.
November 9, 2025	Meshawn Maddock					Maddock was preemptively pardoned in a presidential proclamation announced November 9, 2025, for conduct relating to the Trump fake electors plot.
November 9, 2025	Michael McDonald					McDonald was preemptively pardoned in a presidential proclamation announced November 9, 2025, for conduct relating to the Trump fake electors plot.
November 9, 2025	Mark Meadows					Meadows was preemptively pardoned in a presidential proclamation announced November 9, 2025, for conduct relating to the Trump fake electors plot.
November 9, 2025	Shawn Meehan					Meehan was preemptively pardoned in a presidential proclamation announced November 9, 2025, for conduct relating to the Trump fake electors plot.
November 9, 2025	Robert Montgomery					Montgomery was preemptively pardoned in a presidential proclamation announced November 9, 2025, for conduct relating to the Trump fake electors plot.
November 9, 2025	Daryl Moody					Moody was preemptively pardoned in a presidential proclamation announced November 9, 2025, for conduct relating to the Trump fake electors plot.
November 9, 2025	Samuel I. Moorhead					Moorhead was preemptively pardoned in a presidential proclamation announced November 9, 2025, for conduct relating to the Trump fake electors plot.
November 9, 2025	Loraine Pellegrino					Pellegrino was preemptively pardoned in a presidential proclamation announced November 9, 2025, for conduct relating to the Trump fake electors plot.
November 9, 2025	Sidney Powell					Powell was preemptively pardoned in a presidential proclamation announced November 9, 2025, for conduct relating to the Trump fake electors plot.
November 9, 2025	James Renner					Renner was preemptively pardoned in a presidential proclamation announced November 9, 2025, for conduct relating to the Trump fake electors plot.
November 9, 2025	Eileen Rice					Rice was preemptively pardoned in a presidential proclamation announced November 9, 2025, for conduct relating to the Trump fake electors plot.
November 9, 2025	Mayra Rodriguez					Rodriguez was preemptively pardoned in a presidential proclamation announced November 9, 2025, for conduct relating to the Trump fake electors plot.
November 9, 2025	Mike Roman					Roman was preemptively pardoned in a presidential proclamation announced November 9, 2025, for conduct relating to the Trump fake electors plot.
November 9, 2025	Rose Rook					Rook was preemptively pardoned in a presidential proclamation announced November 9, 2025, for conduct relating to the Trump fake electors plot.
November 9, 2025	Kelly Ruh					Ruh was preemptively pardoned in a presidential proclamation announced November 9, 2025, for conduct relating to the Trump fake electors plot.
November 9, 2025	Greg Safsten					Safsten was preemptively pardoned in a presidential proclamation announced November 9, 2025, for conduct relating to the Trump fake electors plot.
November 9, 2025	David Shafer					Shafer was preemptively pardoned in a presidential proclamation announced November 9, 2025, for conduct relating to the Trump fake electors plot.
November 9, 2025	Marian Sheridan					Sheridan was preemptively pardoned in a presidential proclamation announced November 9, 2025, for conduct relating to the Trump fake electors plot.
November 9, 2025	Ray Stallings Smith III					Smith was preemptively pardoned in a presidential proclamation announced November 9, 2025, for conduct relating to the Trump fake electors plot.
November 9, 2025	Robert F. Spindell Jr.					Spindell was preemptively pardoned in a presidential proclamation announced November 9, 2025, for conduct relating to the Trump fake electors plot.
November 9, 2025	Shawn Still					Still was preemptively pardoned in a presidential proclamation announced November 9, 2025, for conduct relating to the Trump fake electors plot.
November 9, 2025	Ken Thompson					Thompson was preemptively pardoned in a presidential proclamation announced November 9, 2025, for conduct relating to the Trump fake electors plot.
November 9, 2025	Pam Travis					Travis was preemptively pardoned in a presidential proclamation announced November 9, 2025, for conduct relating to the Trump fake electors plot.
November 9, 2025	James Troupis					Troupis was preemptively pardoned in a presidential proclamation announced November 9, 2025, for conduct relating to the Trump fake electors plot.
November 9, 2025	Kent Vanderwood					Vanderwood was preemptively pardoned in a presidential proclamation announced November 9, 2025, for conduct relating to the Trump fake electors plot.
November 9, 2025	Kelli Ward					Ward was preemptively pardoned in a presidential proclamation announced November 9, 2025, for conduct relating to the Trump fake electors plot.
November 9, 2025	Michael Ward					Ward was preemptively pardoned in a presidential proclamation announced November 9, 2025, for conduct relating to the Trump fake electors plot.
November 9, 2025	C.B. Yadav					Yadav was preemptively pardoned in a presidential proclamation announced November 9, 2025, for conduct relating to the Trump fake electors plot.
November 13, 2025	Joe Lewis	Southern District of New York	April 2024	$5,000,000 in fines and three years' probation. Lewis's company, Broad Bay Limited, was also ordered to pay $50 million in related penalties.	Insider trading and conspiracy	Lewis was convicted of passing confidential corporate information to other people who traded on the tips over a period of eight years.
November 14, 2025	Suzanne Kaye	Southern District of Florida	April 21, 2023	18 months' imprisonment; two years' supervised release	Interstate Communications - Threats	When FBI agents sought to question Kaye in the January 6 Capitol attacks, Kaye posted videos to social media threatening to shoot the agents. Kaye was ultimately not charged in the January 6 Capitol attack, but served 18 months in prison for the threats.
November 14, 2025	Joseph Schwartz	District of New Jersey	April 10, 2025	36 months' imprisonment; three years' supervised release; $100,000 fine; $5,000,000 restitution	Willful failure to pay over employment taxes; failure to file the Annual 5500 Report	Schwartz pleaded guilty in January 2024 in what prosecutors said was a $38 million payroll tax fraud scheme involving employees of his chain of nursing homes. Separately, Schwartz pleaded guilty to Medicare and tax fraud involving his nursing homes in Arkansas, and was sentenced to a year's imprisonment by a state judge. He was ordered to serve his federal and state sentences concurrently. When Schwartz received his federal pardon, he was ordered to report to Arkansas's Department of Corrections to continue serving his sentence in the state case. The Arkansas Post Prison Transfer Board paroled Schwartz after serving three weeks. Former employees have brought a separate civil suit against Schwartz, claiming that he stole more than $2M from their paychecks that they had been told was going for health insurance. As of March 2026, awards arising from successful civil actions against Schwartz brought by families of nursing homes residents have not been satisfied, owing to an still-incomplete accounting of his assets.
November 14, 2025	Daniel Edwin Wilson	District of Columbia	August 28, 2024	60 months' imprisonment; 36 months' supervised release	Possession of a firearm by a prohibited person; possession of an unregistered firearm	Wilson was under investigation in the January 6 Capitol attack when authorities discovered a cache of weapons and ammunition during a search of his home. Because of prior felony convictions, firearm possession was illegal, and Wilson was charged for both his actions on January 6 and gun charges. Wilson pleaded guilty and was sentenced to five years on all the combined charges. When most of the January 6 Capitol assault participants received pardons, Wilson remained imprisoned as a result of the gun charges. His lawyers argued that the original pardon covered the firearms charges, but a judge disagreed. This second pardon covers the gun charges.
December 1, 2025	Juan Orlando Hernández	Southern District of New York	June 26, 2024	540 months' imprisonment; five years' supervised release; $8,000,000 fine	Conspiracy to import cocaine into the United States; possessing machine guns and destructive devices in furtherance of the cocaine importation conspiracy; conspiracy to use and carry machine guns and destructive devices	Hernández was formerly the president of Honduras, and prosecutors alleged that while in office he took bribes from drug cartels to facilitate the transport of cocaine through Honduras to the United States. Hernández made a plea for clemency with a four-page letter to Trump that was delivered by Roger Stone, who told the Wall Street Journal that he urged Trump to time the pardon to help Hernández's conservative party in the Honduran presidential elections. Trump's November 28, 2025 announcement came a few days before the Honduran presidential election, and contemporaneously with the clemency announcement, Trump endorsed the Honduran presidential candidate from Hernández's political party. Justifying the pardon, Trump claimed that Hernández had been victim of "a Biden administration set-up." In April 2026, a group of anonymous Honduran journalists launched a website with what they said were audio recordings of Hernández telling confidants about the help he had received in obtaining the pardon from Trump, and his efforts to start a U.S.-based media operation in concert with the Trump administration to release damaging claims about the political leaders of Columbia and Mexico, as well as his Honduran political opponents.
December 2, 2025	Tim Leiweke	Western District of Texas	None. Trial was scheduled for May 4, 2026	Facing 10 years and $1 million fine	Violation of Section 1 of the Sherman Act for allegedly conspiring to rig a bid.	Orchestrating a conspiracy to rig the bidding process for an arena at a public university in Austin, Texas to benefit his own company and deprive taxpayers of the benefits of competitive bidding. The Wall Street Journal reported that Trump decided to grant a pardon dropping the case after one of Leiweke's attorneys, Trey Gowdy, discussed the prosecution following a round of golf with the president.
December 2, 2025	Henry Cuellar and Imelda Cuellar					Henry Cuellar and Imelda Cuellar had been scheduled to go on trial for two counts of conspiracy; two counts of bribery; honest services wire fraud; honest services wire fraud conspiracy; money laundering conspiracy; and five counts of money laundering at the time of their pardon. In their indictment, prosecutors alleged that Cuellar had accepted bribes to use his position as a Member of Congress to advocate for Azerbaijan and a Mexican bank. Shortly after the pardons, Henry Cuellar filed to run for reelection, remaining a Democrat. Trump attacked Cuellar on social media for not switching parties: “Such a lack of LOYALTY, something that Texas Voters, and Henry's daughters, will not like."
December 11, 2025	Tina Peters		October 3, 2024	8.5 years in prison, 6 months in county jail	Influencing a public servant, conspiracy to impersonate, official misconduct, violation of duty, and failing to follow Colorado's Secretary of State regulations	Trump's pardon had no direct legal effect on Peters's state convictions. Following the federal pardon, the overruled Trump administration undertook a series of actions -- announcing plans to shutter the NOAA National Center for Atmospheric Research facility in Boulder, relocating the United States Space Command out of Colorado, blocking funding to complete a water pipeline to rural Colorado communities, and forcing Colorado to recertify all its recipients of federal food assistance -- that were seen as pressuring Colorado to release Peters. On May 15, 2026, Colorado Governor Jared Polis overruled his clemency board and commuted Peters's sentence, ordering her paroled on June 1, 2026. After two members of the clemency advisory board went public with the board's decision against Peters, Polis fired them.
January 15, 2026	Adriana Isabel Camberos	Southern District of California	June 26, 2025	12 months and one day's imprisonment; three years' supervised release; $48,824,415.45 restitution	Conspiracy to commit wire and mail fraud; wire fraud and aiding and abetting (seven counts)	Adriana Camberos, then known as Adriana Shayota, was convicted in 2016 in an unrelated fraud case. In early 2021, Trump commuted her sentence in that case, after former White House counsel Stefan C. Passantino and former Rudolph W. Giuliani attorney Adam Katz advocated for clemency. Camberos, along with her brother Andres Camberos, were subsequently charged and convicted in 2025 on unrelated fraud charges, and she was sentenced to fourteen months' imprisonment and ordered to make millions of dollars in restitution to her victims. Passantino and Katz again lobbied for clemency, and Trump granted both her and her brother pardons in the new fraud case.
January 15, 2026	Andres Enrique Camberos	Southern District of California	June 26, 2025	Three years' probation; $48,824,415.45 restitution	Conspiracy to commit wire and mail fraud; wire fraud and aiding and abetting (seven counts)	Andres Camberos was pardoned along with his sister, Adriana Camberos, in a multimillion dollar fraud scheme.
January 15, 2026	Danny Preston Conrad	Southern District of Georgia	August 28, 1979	Three years' probation, conditioned upon 52 weeks' weekend jail time	Embezzling by postal employee	
January 15, 2026	Arie Eric De Jong, III	Southern District of California	May 23, 2018	Five months' imprisonment; three years' supervised release; $2,254,593.27 restitution; $15,000 fine	Conspiracy	De Jong owned a portable toilet services company, and pleaded guilty in 2017 to illegally disposing of sludge in cities across Southern California.
January 15, 2026	Russell John Flint, Jr.	Northern District of Illinois	June 30, 1966	Two years' probation	Aiding and abetting the making of false Selective Service Registration Certificates	
January 15, 2026	Julio M. Herrera Velutini	District of Puerto Rico			Conspiracy (two counts); federal program bribery (two counts); honest services wire fraud (two counts)	Herrera was originally indicted on felony charges in conjunction with a bribery case against Vázquez, a former Governor of Puerto Rico. After Herrera's daughter donated $2.5M, and then a further $1M, to Trump's super PAC MAGA Inc., Herrera, Vázquez and third defendant Rossini pleaded guilty to a reduced set of misdemeanor campaign finance charges. Shortly after the charges were reduced, Herrera's daughter pledged another $2.5M to Trump's controversial White House state ballroom renovation project. The New York Times later reported that as the plea deal went through but before clemency was granted, Herrera's daughter started a business entity and hired Alina Habba, then the U.S. Attorney for New Jersey, to serve as the company's general counsel under a $50M pay package. The pardon was granted several weeks after Habba started work and while she was simultaneously serving as a Department of Justice special employee and a senior advisor to then-Attorney General Pam Bondi. Habbi told the Times that Herrera's pardon was unrelated to her work for the new business. The original pardon was amended on January 20, 2026, to include the new case number associated with the plea deal.
January 15, 2026	Kenneth Caprist Kelly	District of Maryland	April 14, 1993	69 months' imprisonment (as amended); five years' supervised release	Armed bank robbery; assault during armed bank robbery; use of firearm during a crime of violence	
January 15, 2026	James Michael Klos	District of Western Pennsylvania	September 18, 2006	12 months' probation, conditioned upon 50 hours' community service	Possession of an unregistered firearm	
January 15, 2026	David Levy	Eastern District of New York	January 10, 2024	Time served; $5,000 fine	Conspiracy to commit securities fraud; securities fraud	
January 15, 2026	Hollie Ann Nadel	District of the District of Columbia	September 9, 2024	Time served; three years' supervised release; $250,000 restitution	Conspiracy to commit money laundering and bank fraud	
January 15, 2026	Mark T. Rossini	District of Puerto Rico			Conspiracy; federal program bribery; honest services wire fraud	Rossini, a former FBI agent working for Herrera, pleaded guilty in 2025 to misdemeanor campaign finance charges arising from a political corruption case. The original pardon was then amended on January 20, 2026, to include the new case number associated with the plea deal. In October 2026, the Washington Post reported that shortly after the charges were reduced, Herrera's daughter pledged another $2.5M to Trump's controversial White House State Ballroom renovation project.
January 15, 2026	Wanda Vázquez Garced	District of Puerto Rico			Conspiracy; federal program bribery; honest services wire fraud	Vázquez, along with Herrera and Rossini, pleaded guilty in 2025 to misdemeanor campaign finance charges arising from a political corruption case. The original pardon was then amended on January 20, 2026, to include the new case number associated with the plea deal.
January 16, 2026	Terren Scott Peizer	Central District of California	June 23, 2025	42 months' imprisonment; three years' supervised release; $5.25M fine; $27.5M in forfeitures	Securities fraud; insider trading (two counts)	Peizer, former CEO of health care company Ontrak, was convicted in an insider trading scheme.
February 12, 2026	Travis Henry	District of Montana	July 15, 2009	36 months' imprisonment; five years' supervised release	Conspiracy to possess with intent to distribute cocaine	
February 12, 2026	Timothy S. Smith	Southern District of New York	November 19, 1987	Five years' probation	Conspiring to defraud the Internal Revenue Service	
February 12, 2026	Nathaniel Newton, Jr.	Northern District of Texas	August 15, 2002	30 months' imprisonment; 36 months' supervised release; $25,000.00 fine	Conspiracy to possess with intent to distribute marijuana	
February 12, 2026	Joseph Klecko	Eastern District of Pennsylvania	April 8, 1993	Three months' imprisonment; two years' supervised release	Perjury	
February 12, 2026	Jamal Lewis	Northern District of Georgia	January 26, 2005	Four months' imprisonment; one year's supervised release	Use of telephone to facilitate an attempt to possess with intent to distribute cocaine	
February 12, 2026	Elite Diesel Service, Inc.	District of Colorado	December 5, 2024	Five years' probation, conditioned upon a corporate compliance program and reporting requirements and a $12,500 community service fee; $50,000.00 fine	Conspiracy to violate the Clean Air Act	Elite Diesel Service was the company owned by Troy Lake, pardoned earlier in November of 2025.
February 12, 2026	Billy Cannon	District of Montana		60 months' imprisonment and a $10,000 fine	Conspiracy	
6 June 2026	Steve Buyer	Southern District of New York, judge Richard M. Berman	September 19, 2023, appeal denied in May, 2026.	22 months' imprisonment, a $10,000 fine and hand over of profits	Insider Trading	Former Congressperson Buyer used his position as a corporate consultant to engage in illegal stock trades ahead of significant announcements in 2018-19, generating some $354,027 in profits.
July 3, 2026	Jonathan Dean Achtemeier	Western District of Washington	February 14, 2025	Four months' imprisonment; one year's supervised release; $25,000 fine	Conspiracy to violate the Clean Air Act	
July 3, 2026	Timothy Curtis Clancy, II	District of Oregon	February 25, 2025	Three years' probation; $101,510 fine	Clean Air Act tampering	
July 3, 2026	Clancy Logistics Inc.	District of Oregon	February 25, 2025	Three years' probation; $101,510 fine	Clean Air Act tampering	
July 3, 2026	Joshua L. Davis	Western District of North Carolina	March 31, 2022	Three years' probation; $50,000 fine	Conspiracy to defraud the United States and violate the Clean Air Act	
July 3, 2026	Matthew Sidney Geouge	Western District of North Carolina	June 23, 2022	12 months and one day's imprisonment; three years' supervised release, conditioned upon six months' home confinement; $1,205,532 restitution	Conspiracy to defraud the United States and violate the Clean Air Act; tax evasion	
July 3, 2026	Jack Charles Harvard	Eastern District of Texas	January 17, 1997	Two years' imprisonment; $100,000 restitution	False statement to a federally insured bank, and aiding and abetting	
July 3, 2026	Adam R. Kidan	Southern District of Florida	March 29, 2006	70 months' imprisonment; three years' supervised release; $21,701,015.45 restitution	Conspiracy to commit wire fraud and mail fraud; wire fraud	Kidan had been prosecuted as part of the Jack Abramoff lobbying scandal in the early 2000s. Newsday reported that he recently hosted a fundraiser for a Republican congressional candidate at Trump's Mar-a-Lago estate.
July 3, 2026	Ryan Reginald LaLone	Western District of Michigan	February 23, 2024	One year's probation; $7,500 fine	Violation of Clean Air Act	
July 3, 2026	Wade James LaLone	Western District of Michigan	February 23, 2024	One year's probation; $4,000 fine	Violation of Clean Air Act	
July 3, 2026	Accurate Truck Service LLC	Western District of Michigan	October 17, 2023	One year's probation; $500,000 fine	Conspiracy to violate the Clean Air Act	
July 3, 2026	Diesel Freak LLC	Western District of Michigan	February 23, 2024	Five years' probation; $750,000 fine	Conspiracy to violate the Clean Air Act	
July 3, 2026	Griffin Transportation Inc.	Western District of Michigan	October 17, 2023	One year's probation; $500,000 fine	Conspiracy to violate the Clean Air Act	
July 3, 2026	Barry Kendal Pierce	District of Idaho	July 30, 2024	Four months' imprisonment; one year's supervised release; $1,000,000 fine	Clean Air Act	
July 3, 2026	Custom Auto of Rexburg LLC	District of Idaho	July 30, 2024	Five years' probation; $1,000,000 fine	Tampering with a monitoring device or method required by the Clean Air Act	
July 3, 2026	GDP Tuning LLC	District of Idaho	July 30, 2024	Five years' probation; $1,000,000 fine	Conspiracy to violate the Clean Air Act	
July 3, 2026	Aaron Lucas Roskin Rudolf	District of Columbia	April 12, 2024	36 months' probation; $600,000 fine	Conspiracy to violate the Clean Air Act	
July 3, 2026	Mackenzie Scott Spurlock	District of Alaska	December 3, 2025	Five years' probation; $32,000 fine	Tampering with Clean Air Act monitoring device	
September 3, 2026	Patrick Tate Adamiak	Eastern District of Virginia	June 13, 2023	240 months' imprisonment; three years' supervised release	Receive and possess and unregistered firearm; unlawful possession and transfer of a machine gun; receive and possess an unregistered destructive device (three counts)	
September 3, 2026	Isaac Merrill Allen	District of Maine	May 7, 2025	Three years' probation; $40,000 fine	Conspiracy to tamper with Clean Air Act monitoring devices; obstruction of agency proceeding	
September 3, 2026	Spade K. Bailly	Western District of North Carolina	March 31, 2022	Three years' probation, conditioned upon 100 hours' community service and six months' home confinement; $10,000 fine	Conspiracy to defraud the United States and to violate the Clean Air Act	
September 3, 2026	Suzula Bidon	1. Southern District of New York 2. District of Minnesota	October 26, 2006; May 30, 2008	1. One year of imprisonment; five years' supervised release. 2. 18 months' imprisonment; two years' supervised release	1. Conspiracy to possess with intent to distribute methamphetamine. 2. Supervised release violation (conspiracy to possess with intent to distribute methamphetamine)	
September 3, 2026	Thomas Leon Brooks, Jr.	District of South Carolina	March 8, 2002	Five years' probation, conditioned upon 200 hours' community service	Manufacturing counterfeit currency	
September 3, 2026	Giovanna Campo	District of Nevada	January 18, 1996	18 months' probation; $4,500 restitution	Possession of counterfeit United States obligations	
September 3, 2026	Daniel Aaron Chase	District of Alaska	November 2, 2023	Three years' probation; $50,000 fine	Tampering with Clean Air Act monitoring device	
September 3, 2026	Shane Cox	District of Kansas	February 6, 2017	Two years' probation	Possession of an unregistered firearm; transfer of a firearm in violation of National Firearm Act (five counts); making a firearm in violation of National Firearm Act; engaging in business as a dealer and manufacturer of firearms	
September 3, 2026	Billi Jo Engbrecht	District of South Dakota	April 15, 2002	One day's imprisonment; six months' supervised release, $500 fine	Bank embezzlement	
September 3, 2026	Russell Fincher	Eastern District of Oklahoma	November 19, 2024	Two years' probation	Selling ammunition to a prohibited person	
September 3, 2026	Michael Wayne Hanzuk, II	District of Alaska	August 31, 2022	Five years' probation, conditioned upon six months' home confinement; $66,000 fine	Conspiracy to violate the Clean Air Act	
September 3, 2026	Jessica Lynn Jacobson	District of North Dakota	July 25, 2005	Three years' probation, conditioned upon six months' community confinement; $1,000.81 restitution	Conspiracy to make and utter counterfeit obligations and securities of the United States	
September 3, 2026	Christopher Paul Kaufman	District of Oregon	September 4, 2024	Three years' probation; $150,000 fine	Clean Air Act Tampering	
September 3, 2026	Jeremy Ryan Kettler	District of Kansas	February 6, 2017	One year's probation	Possession of unregistered firearm	
September 3, 2026	Eric Wayne Larson	Western District of Michigan	December 14, 1995	156 months' imprisonment; five years' supervised release; $25,000 fine	Conspiracy to distribute cocaine	
September 3, 2026	Jonathan F. Long	Eastern District of Virginia	May 16, 2025	12 months' probation, conditioned upon 91 days' home confinement; $88,514 fine	Accessory after the fact of falsifying, tampering with, and rendering inaccurate a monitoring device required by the Clean Air Act	
September 3, 2026	Ryan Hugh Milliken	Eastern District of Washington	January 22, 2025	Five years' probation; $75,000 fine	Conspiracy to violate the Clean Air Act	
September 3, 2026	Kyle David Offringa	Northern District of New York	March 20, 2025	$100,000 fine	Conspiracy to violate the Clean Air Act	
September 3, 2026	Louis Michael Olerio, Jr.	Northern District of Texas	December 2, 2013	24 months' imprisonment; two years' supervised release;	Money laundering conspiracy	
September 3, 2026	George Peterson	Eastern District of Louisiana	January 9, 2024	24 months' imprisonment; three years' supervised release	Possession of an unregistered silencer	
September 3, 2026	Dustin Rhine	Western District of Michigan	January 8, 2024	One year's probation; $2,000 fine	Conspiracy to violate the Clean Air Act	
September 3, 2026	James Sisson	Western District of Michigan	February 23, 2024	One year's probation; $2,000 fine	Conspiracy to violate the Clean Air Act	
September 3, 2026	Travis Turner	District of Oregon	June 20, 2023	Six months' imprisonment; no supervised release	Accessory after the fact to Clean Air Tampering	
September 8, 2026	Emory Clash Jones	District of Maryland	October 15, 2000	151 months' imprisonment (as amended); five years' supervised release	Conspiracy to distribute cocaine hydrochloride and cocaine base	
October 13, 2026	Zachary Czubak	District of Alaska	November 9, 2022	Five years' probation, $66,000 fine, 180 hours of community service	Conspiracy to violate the Clean Air Act	Co-owners of an auto repair shop which modifed diesel vehicles to remove pollution controls. Pardon signed on stage by Trump during a campaign event in Alaska.
October 13, 2026	Patrick Flemming	District of Alaska	November 9, 2022	Five years' probation, $66,000 fine, 180 hours of community service	Conspiracy to violate the Clean Air Act	Co-owners of an auto repair shop which modifed diesel vehicles to remove pollution controls. Pardon signed on stage by Trump during a campaign event in Alaska.

=== Commutations ===
Date of commutation	Name	Court	Sentencing date	Sentence	Offense	Notes
March 4, 2025	Jean Pinkard	Eastern District of Michigan	May 8, 2024	One year and one day's imprisonment, three years' supervised release	Conspiracy to possess with intent to distribute and to distribute controlled opioids	Pinkard is a nurse practitioner from Detroit who was one of 19 people in a drug scheme connection involving opioids. On September 30, 2020, she reached a plea agreement in the case.
March 28, 2025	Jason Galanis	Southern District of New York	(1) February 15, 2017; (2) August 11, 2017	(1) 135 months' imprisonment, three years' supervised release, $37,032,337,43 restitution (amended on June 5, 2017); (2) 173 months' imprisonment with 60 months consecutive, three years' supervised release (concurrent) $47,785,176 restitution	(1) Conspiracy to commit securities fraud (two counts), securities fraud, investment adviser fraud; (2) Conspiracy to commit securities fraud, securities fraud, conspiracy to commit investment adviser fraud	Galanis is a former business associate of Hunter Biden. He was sentenced in 2017 for his role in a bond scheme that defrauded the Oglala tribe and pension fund investors out of tens of millions of dollars. President Trump's commutation included relief from further restitution payments owed to Galanis's victims; after the commutation was granted, Galanis petitioned U.S. District Judge Kevin Castelto have $2 million of the restitution he had already paid returned to him. Judge Castelto denied the request.
March 28, 2025	Carlos Watson	Eastern District of New York	December 16, 2024	116 months' imprisonment, two years of supervised release	Conspiracy to commit securities fraud, conspiracy to commit wire fraud, aggravated identity theft	Watson, a former contributor on MSNBC and co-founder/CEO of Ozy Media, was arrested on fraud charges in 2023 with Ozy ceased operations following Watson's arrest. In 2024, Watson was convicted in New York of repeatedly lying to investors about the financial health of Ozy Media. In March 2025, following advocacy efforts by Alice Marie Johnson and Glenn E. Martin, Trump commuted Watson's sentence hours before he was scheduled to report to prison.
March 28, 2025	Ozy Media	Eastern District of New York	January 6, 2025	116 months' imprisonment, two years of supervised release	Conspiracy to commit securities fraud, conspiracy to commit wire fraud, aggravated identity theft	Watson, a former contributor on MSNBC and co-founder/CEO of Ozy Media, was arrested on fraud charges in 2023 with Ozy ceased operations following Watson's arrest. In 2024, Watson was convicted in New York of repeatedly lying to investors about the financial health of Ozy Media. In March 2025, following advocacy efforts by Alice Marie Johnson and Glenn E. Martin, Trump commuted Watson's sentence hours before he was scheduled to report to prison.
May 28, 2025	Larry Hoover	Northern District of Illinois	June 18, 1998	Life imprisonment plus 5 years supervised release; commuted to time served	Narcotics conspiracy; continuing criminal enterprise; use of persons under age 18; distribution of cocaine; use of a communication facility in committing the narcotics conspiracy; distribution of cocaine (two counts); use of a firearm in the commission of a drug trafficking crime	Hoover was a leader of the Gangster Disciples Chicago gang. He was imprisoned for 150 to 200 years on a 1973 State of Illinois murder conviction, but still continued to direct gang activities from prison. Convicted in 1998 on federal charges for gang activities. Ye, previously known as Kanye West, advocated for clemency for Hoover, and Hoover's son thanked Ye for his assistance. Commuting his federal sentence to time served meant he still had to serve the remainder of his state sentence. However he was eligible for parole in Illinois, and his family was appealing to the governor.
May 28, 2025	Lawrence S. Duran	Southern District of Florida	September 16, 2011	50 years' imprisonment; three years' supervised release; $87,533,863.46 restitution	Conspiracy to commit health care fraud; health care fraud (11 counts); conspiracy to defraud the United States and to receive and pay health care kickbacks; conspiracy to commit money laundering; money laundering (18 counts); structuring to avoid reporting requirements (six counts)	Duran was one of a group of owners and managers of the American Therapeutic Corporation that were convicted in a scheme to bilk Medicare out of $200 million in fraudulent billing. Another defendant in the case, Judith Negron, had her sentence commuted by President Trump in 2020.
May 28, 2025	Marian I. Morgan	Middle District of Florida	April 27, 2012	405 months' imprisonment; three years' supervised release; $19,958,995 restitution	Conspiracy to defraud the United States; wire fraud (7 counts); transfer of funds taken by fraud (5 counts); money laundering (6 counts); making false statements on income tax returns (3 counts)	Morgan and her husband were convicted in a Ponzi scheme that bilked investors out of $28 million. The commutation warrant not only commutes Morgan's sentence to time served, but also releases her from paying further restitution to her victims.
May 28, 2025	Garnett Gilbert Smith	District of Maryland	January 30, 2014	300 months' imprisonment; five years' supervised release	Conspiracy to distribute and possess with intent to distribute cocaine	25-year sentence broadly considered a disproportionate punishment for drug trafficking.
May 28, 2025	Anabel Valenzuela	District of Hawaii	January 5, 2009	384 months' imprisonment; five years' supervised release	Conspiracy to distribute and possess with intent to distribute 50 grams or more of methamphetamine; conspiracy to commit money laundering; criminal forfeiture (two counts)	32-year sentence broadly considered a disproportionate punishment for drug trafficking.
May 28, 2025	Imaad Zuberi	Central District of California	February 18, 2021	144 months' imprisonment; three years' supervised release; $1,750,000 fine; $15,705,080.11 restitution	Falsifying records to conceal his work as a foreign agent while lobbying high-level U.S. government officials, evading the payment of millions of dollars in taxes, making illegal campaign contributions, and obstructing a federal investigation into the source of donations to a presidential inauguration committee.	In 2019, Zuberi pleaded guilty to illegal campaign contributions, falsifying foreign agent records with the Department of Justice, and tax evasion. In 2020, Zuberi pleaded guilty to obstructing a federal investigation into the source of a $900,000 campaign contribution he made to the Trump inaugural committee in 2016. The commutation warrant not only commutes Zuberi's sentence to time served, but also releases him from paying fines and restitutions arising from his case. On October 1, 2025, the commutation was amended to include a related Obstruction of Justice charge.
May 29, 2025	Edward Ruben Sotelo	Northern District of Texas	August 17, 1995	Life imprisonment; five years' supervised release; $50,000 fine	Conspiracy; continuing criminal enterprise; possession with intent to distribute 1 kilogram of cocaine, aiding and abetting (two counts); use of telephone to facilitate commission of a felony (three counts); possession with intent to distribute 10 pounds of marijuana, and aiding and abetting; distribution of more than five kilograms of cocaine and aiding and abetting	
May 29, 2025	Joe Angelo Sotelo	Northern District of Texas	August 17, 1995	Life imprisonment; five years' supervised release	Conspiracy; possession with intent to distribute one kilogram of cocaine and aiding and abetting	Life sentence broadly considered a disproportionate punishment.
October 17, 2025	George Santos	Eastern District of New York	April 25, 2025	87 months' imprisonment; two years' supervised release; $373,749.97 restitution/	Wire fraud; aggravated identity theft	The commutation of the former Member of Congress was announced in a social media post by President Trump, who said: “At least Santos had the Courage, Conviction, and Intelligence to ALWAYS VOTE REPUBLICAN!” The commutation warrant also releases Santos from paying any additional fines or restitution that he agreed to under his plea deal. On June 2, 2026, NPR reported that regulators were investigating Santos for insider trading on the Kalshi predictions market.
November 26, 2025	David Gentile	Eastern District of New York	May 9, 2025	Seven years' imprisonment; three years' supervised release	$1.6 billion multi-year investment fraud scheme defrauding over 10,000 investors. Convicted of securities fraud, conspiracy to commit wire fraud, and substantive securities fraud and wire fraud.	Gentile was released less than two weeks after reporting to prison. The commutation also releases Gentile from paying further fines or restitution to his victims. Gentile's co-consiprator, sentenced to six years imprisonment, was not released. The New York Times subsequently reported that career federal prosecutors had opened an inquiry into whether improper payments from Gentile had figured into his commutation, but that the investigation had been shut down after a phone call from associated deputy attorney general Aakash Singh to U.S. Attorney for the Eastern District of New York Joseph Nocella Jr.
January 15, 2026	Jimmy Ray Barnett	Northern District of Texas	June 9, 2000	480 months' imprisonment; five years' supervised release	Conspiracy and aiding and abetting; possession with intent to distribute 50 grams or more of methamphetamine; possession with intent to distribute 50 grams or more of amphetamine; possession with intent to distribute methamphetamine; convicted felon in possession of firearms	
January 15, 2026	Zechariah Benjamin	Northern District of Iowa	October 9, 2008	Life imprisonment; eight years' supervised release (as amended)	Distribute and aid and abet the distribution of 5 grams or more of cocaine base after having been convicted of two felony drug offenses; distribute 5 grams or more of cocaine base after having been convicted of two felony drug offenses; conspiracy to distribute and possess with intent to distribute 50 grams or more of cocaine base after two prior felony drug offenses	
January 15, 2026	Angela Wannette Cupit	Northern District of Texas	January 15, 2016	360 months' imprisonment; four years' supervised release	Conspiracy to possess with intent to distribute a controlled substance	
January 15, 2026	Jacob Deutsch	District of Connecticut	January 8, 2024	62 months' imprisonment; four years' supervised release; $10,000 fine	Conspiracy to commit mail fraud and wire fraud	Deutsch was convicted for his role in a mortgage fraud case. Deutsch's commutation was championed by the Tzedek Association, a group that was influential in the clemency process for white-collar criminals in Trump's first presidency.
January 15, 2026	Juan Mercado, III	Southern District of Texas	December 12, 2012	1. 240 months' imprisonment; 10 years' supervised release; 2. 175 days' imprisonment (December 12, 2012)	1. Conspiracy to possess, with intent to distribute, 2160.02 kilograms of marijuana 2. Supervised release violation (conspiracy to possess with intent to distribute five kilograms or more of cocaine)	
January 15, 2026	Angela Reynolds	Northern District of Texas	May 13, 2016	275 months' imprisonment; four years' supervised release	Conspiracy to possess with intent to distribute a controlled substance	
January 15, 2026	Andre Donnell Routt	Eastern District of Texas	August 19, 1994	Life imprisonment; five years' supervised release	Did knowingly and intentionally conspire, combine, confederate and agree together, with each other and with other persons to knowingly and intentionally distribute and possess with intent to distribute five kilograms or more of cocaine	
January 15, 2026	James Phillip Womack	Western District of Arkansas	May 21, 2024	96 months' imprisonment; five years' supervised release; $1,900 fine	Distribution of more than five grams of actual methamphetamine	Womack is the son of Steve Womack, U.S. Representative in Arkansas's 3rd District.
September 3, 2026	Molly Ann Bloom	Northern District of Texas	February 20, 2020	148 months' imprisonment; three years' supervised release	Conspiracy to possess with intent to distribute a controlled substance	
September 3, 2026	John Dougherty	Eastern District of Pennsylvania	July 11, 2024	72 months' imprisonment; three years' supervised release, conditioned upon 100 hours' community service	Conspiracy to embezzle labor union and employee benefit plan assets; embezzlement of labor union assets (33 counts); wire fraud (24 counts); falsification of labor union annual reporting (two counts); falsification of labor union financial records (two counts); making and subscribing to false federal income tax returns (four counts); conspiracy to commit honest services fraud and federal program bribery; honest services wire fraud (seven counts)	
September 3, 2026	Holly Leanne Frantzen	Northern District of Texas	December 23, 2016	200 months' imprisonment; four years' supervised release	Conspiracy to possess with intent to distribute a controlled substance	
September 3, 2026	Kevin Harden	Eastern District of Texas	February 22, 2013	360 months' imprisonment; five years' supervised release	Conspiracy to possess with the intent to distribute marijuana	
September 3, 2026	Jerry Haymon	Eastern District of Virginia	August 4, 2020	120 months' imprisonment; five years' supervised release	Conspiracy to distribute marijuana	
September 3, 2026	Shemika Alfrida Williams	District of South Carolina	May 9, 2018	180 months' imprisonment; five years' supervised release	Conspiracy to possess with intent to distribute methamphetamine; possession of a firearm during a drug crime	

== See also ==
- Article Two of the United States Constitution
- Federal pardons in the United States
- List of people granted executive clemency in the first Trump presidency
- List of people granted executive clemency by Barack Obama
- List of people pardoned by Bill Clinton
- List of people pardoned by George W. Bush
- List of people pardoned or granted clemency by the president of the United States
