= Imaad Zuberi =

Pakistani-American entrepreneur and convicted felon

Imaad Zuberi (born 1970) is a Pakistani-American entrepreneur, venture capitalist, and philanthropist political fundraiser. He is a partner in Avenue Ventures and has written about foreign investments. Among his major investments is the Al Areen Palace & Spa resort in Bahrain. He pleaded guilty in October 2019 to violating lobbying, campaign finance and tax laws through campaign contributions to members of both parties and was sentenced to twelve years in prison in February 2021.

== Education ==
Zuberi was born in Pakistan and moved to the United States with his parents at the age of three.

He earned a BSc in 1997 from the University of Southern California.

== Career ==
Zuberi was Vice President of strategic development for Manhattan Street Capital and ran its FundAthena. He also served as vice president of Avenue Ventures and previously was vice president of strategy and market/corporate development at AEGON.

He has advised the Chinese government on economic policy and the Sri Lanka government.

== Political support ==
He was a top fundraiser for President Barack Obama's 2012 re-election campaign and in 2015 was listed as a "Hillblazer," as those who raised at least $100,000 for Hillary Clinton's 2016 presidential campaign were known. In 2017, Zuberi contributed $900,000 to Donald Trump's presidential inaugural committee.

He also supported Democrat Terry McAuliffe's 2013 Virginia gubernatorial campaign and the Organizing for Action advocacy group.

== Philanthropy ==
Zuberi has supported the Smithsonian National Museum of American History, the Clinton Foundation and UCLA.

== Criminal charges ==
On February 4, 2019, federal prosecutors in New York subpoenaed communications between Zuberi and the Inaugural Committee as part of a broader investigation that included fraud and money laundering.

On October 22, 2019, Zuberi agreed to plead guilty to charges of falsifying records of his work as a foreign agent, tax evasion, and making nearly $1 million in illegal campaign contributions. Court documents alleged that Zuberi sought contributions from individuals in Bahrain and Sri Lanka, but instead kept the majority of the money for himself. On February 18, 2021, a federal judge sentenced Zuberi to twelve years in prison for falsifying records to conceal his foreign lobbying of high-level U.S. government officials. He was also fined $1.75 million and ordered to pay the government $15.7 million in restitution.

President Donald Trump commuted Zuberi's sentence on May 28, 2025.

== See also ==
- Timeline of Russian interference in the 2016 United States elections
- Timeline of investigations into Trump and Russia (2019–2020)
- List of people granted executive clemency in the second Trump presidency
