= Federal Correctional Institution, Tallahassee =

Federal prison in Florida, United States

FCI Tallahassee
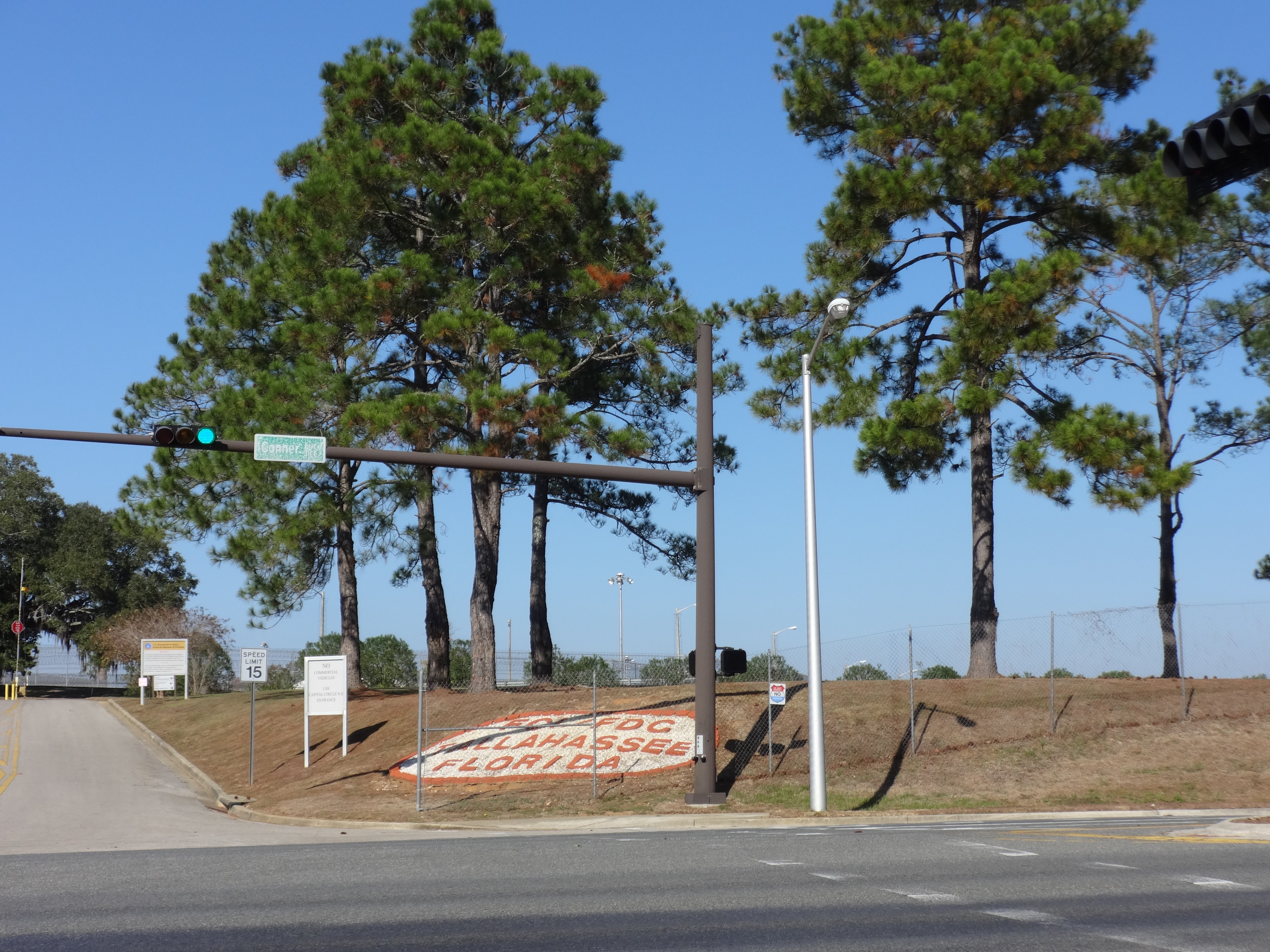
- Entrance signage
- Interactive map of FCI Tallahassee
- Location: 501 Capital Circle N.E. Tallahassee, Florida, U.S.; 30.4451°N 84.2254°W
- Status: Operational
- Security class: Low security
- Population: 753 (April 29, 2021)
- Opened: January 1938
- Managed by: Federal Bureau of Prisons
- Warden: Erica Strong

Federal Correctional Institution, Tallahassee (FCI Tallahassee), is a low security United States federal prison for female inmates in Tallahassee, Florida with a designated capacity of 812. It is operated by the Federal Bureau of Prisons, a division of the Department of Justice. The facility also has an adjacent detention center that houses administrative security level male inmates.

FCI Tallahassee is three miles (5 km) east of downtown Tallahassee on US Highway 319.

== History ==
=== 2006 shootings ===
On June 21, 2006 Federal Bureau of Investigation and United States Department of Justice Office of the Inspector General agents attempted to arrest six correctional officers in connection with a corruption investigation. One of the correctional officers opened fire on the agents with a personal handgun. An agent with the DOJ Office of Inspector General returned fire; both the officer and the agent died from their wounds. The federal officers were unarmed at the time and the correctional officers were supposed to have been unarmed as well. The five surviving guards were arrested and transported to Wakulla County Jail south of Tallahassee; they were convicted and sentenced to one year in prison plus three months probation in early 2007. One who had suffered a stroke was re-sentenced to one year home detention plus three months probation. The case brought about metal detector screening and bag searches of guards coming to work, actions opposed by the guards' union.

== Conditions ==
An inspection by the Justice Department in 2023 found "alarming" conditions, with inmates being fed spoiled food, and with rodent droppings and bugs being an issue. A crumbling infrastructure and staffing issues were cited as the biggest issues facing the facility. In leaked emails, Ghislaine Maxwell claimed that there were possums in the food, people were threatening her life, and that fights were common.

== Notable inmates (current and former) ==
Inmate name	Register No.	Status	Details
Jean McIntosh	68895-066	Serving a 40-year sentence; scheduled for release in 2045.	Convicted for her involvement in the Philadelphia basement kidnapping.
Colleen LaRose	61657-066	Served 10 years; released in November 2018.	US citizen known as "Jihad Jane;" pleaded guilty in 2011 to conspiracy to provide material support to terrorism and conspiracy to kill in a foreign country for using the Internet to recruit people to wage violent jihad in South Asia and Europe.
Chelsea Gerlach	69097-065	Released from custody in 2013; served 6 years.	Member of the ecoterrorist group Earth Liberation Front (ELF); pleaded guilty in 2006 to committing arson at the Vail Ski Resort in Colorado and businesses in Oregon between 1996 and 2001; several other members were also sentenced to prison.
Maria Butina	35406-016	Served an 18-month sentence; released in October 2019.	Convicted of the Espionage act. Was deported back to Russia after her release from Federal Custody.
Catherine May Wood	05523-045	Served a 20–40 year sentence; released January 16, 2020.	Serial killer who murdered nursing home patients in conjunction with her partner Gwendolyn Graham.
Narcisa Veliz Novack	91518-004	Life in prison without parole for the beating deaths of her husband and mother-in-law.	In 2009, Bernice Novack and her son, multi-millionaire Ben Novack Jr., were murdered three months apart. Narcy Novack, Ben's estranged wife, was convicted of orchestrating the murders.
Jaelyn Delshaun Young	16906-042	Served 8 years; released on 28 October 2024.	American woman from Vicksburg, Mississippi, who was convicted of attempting to join ISIS with her fiancé, Muhammad "Moe" Dakhlalla. On August 11, 2016, Young was sentenced to 12 years in prison. Dakhlalla pleaded guilty and testified against Young and received 8 years in prison.
Ghislaine Maxwell	02879-509	Sentenced to 20 years in prison, release date of 17 July 2037. Transferred to FPC Bryan in 2025.	Associate of Jeffrey Epstein, convicted of sexual trafficking of minors and related offenses.
Mary Wilkerson	96283-020	Served 5 years in prison, released on 9 February 2020.	Quality control officer of the Peanut Corporation of America convicted of obstruction of justice.
Lauren Handy	93984-007	Served seven months of a 57 month sentence. Was pardoned by Donald Trump.	
Jatavia Johnson (JT)	16486-104	Served 21 Months, Turned herself in June 29,2018. Released March 7, 2020	American Rapper sentenced for aggravated identity theft related to fraudulent credit card charges.

== See also ==
- List of U.S. federal prisons
