= Freedom of Access to Clinic Entrances Act =

U.S. legislation protecting access to reproductive health clinics

- Long title: Freedom of Access to Clinic Entrances Act of 1994
- Acronyms (colloquial): FACE
- Enacted by: the 103rd United States Congress
- Effective: May 26, 1994

Citations
- Public law: Pub. L. 103–259
- Statutes at Large: 108 Stat. 694

Codification
- Titles amended: 18 U.S.C.: Crimes and Criminal Procedure
- U.S.C. sections created: 18 U.S.C. § 248

Legislative history
- Introduced in the Senate as S. 636 by Ted Kennedy (D–MA) on March 23, 1993; Passed the Senate on November 16, 1993 (69–30); Passed the House of Representatives on March 17, 1994 (237–169); Reported by the joint conference committee on May 2, 1994; agreed to by the House of Representatives on May 5, 1994 (241–174) and by the Senate on May 12, 1994 (69–30); Signed into law by President Bill Clinton on May 26, 1994

The Freedom of Access to Clinic Entrances Act (FACE or the Access Act, Pub. L. No. 103-259, 108 Stat. 694) (May 26, 1994, 18 U.S.C. § 248) is a United States law that was signed by President Bill Clinton in May 1994, which prohibits the following three things: (1) the use of physical force, threat of physical force, or physical obstruction to intentionally injure, intimidate, interfere with or attempt to injure, intimidate or interfere with any person who is obtaining an abortion, (2) the use of physical force, threat of physical force, or physical obstruction to intentionally injure, intimidate, interfere with or attempt to injure, intimidate or interfere with any person who is exercising or trying to exercise their First Amendment right of religious freedom at a place of religious worship, (3) the intentional damage or destruction of a reproductive health care facility or a place of worship.

== Background ==
Between the years 1978 and 1993, there was an increase in the number of crimes committed against abortion providers and abortion clinics. According to statistics gathered by the National Abortion Federation (NAF), an organization of abortion providers, since 1977 in the United States and Canada, there have been at least 9 murders, 17 attempted murders, 406 death threats, 179 incidents of assault or battery, and 5 kidnappings committed against abortion providers. In addition, since 1977 in the United States and Canada, property crimes committed against abortion providers have included 41 bombings, 175 arsons, 96 attempted bombings or arsons, 692 bomb threats, 1993 incidents of trespassing, 1400 incidents of vandalism, and 100 attacks with butyric acid ("stink bombs"). In April 1992, thousands of "prayer warriors" and anti-abortion protesters met at the entrances of Buffalo Abortion Clinics for a planned month of picketing and blockades, trying to dissuade women from ending their pregnancies. After seven days of protests, involving Operation Rescue, over 400 protesters were arrested.

One anti-abortion group known as the Army of God was especially active in committing these violent crimes. This group alone was responsible for bombing and setting fire to over one hundred clinics before 1994. They also invaded more than three hundred clinics and vandalized more than four hundred. In 1993, officials found the Army of God Manual, a tactical guide to arson, chemical attacks, invasions and bombing, buried in the backyard of Army of God activist Shelley Shannon’s home. Shelley Shannon was soon found guilty of the attempted murder of Dr. George Tiller that same year.

In addition to committing acts of violence, some anti-abortion activists were known to stalk medical personnel and use their photographs on "Wanted for Murder" posters. This on-going violence reached its peak in March 1993 when Dr. David Gunn, a physician whose medical practice included abortion procedures, was shot and killed by Michael F. Griffin outside of the Pensacola Women's Medical Services clinic located in Pensacola, Florida. This increase in violence had become very burdensome to local law enforcement, and according to some, local policing of the issue was often lax. Certain senators and representatives believed that such unlawful conduct was interfering with the constitutional right of women to receive reproductive health care services (abortion in particular), which was guaranteed by the Supreme Court after the ruling of Roe v. Wade in 1973, until revoked by the ruling of Dobbs v. Jackson Women's Health Organization in 2022.

=== Legislative history ===
The Act was passed in direct response to the escalation of violent tactics used by anti-abortion activists that culminated in the "Spring of Life" at Buffalo Abortion Clinics, in April 1992 and the murder of Dr. Gunn in March 1993.

The FACE Act was originally introduced in January 1993 and chiefly sponsored by Representative Chuck Schumer (D–NY), with Representative Constance Morella (R–MD) as the chief co-sponsor. A version of the bill was introduced in the Senate in March 1993, this one sponsored by Senator Edward Kennedy (D–MA). Both the House and the Senate approved the bill in November 1993. The House passed the bill by voice vote, and the Senate passed it 69–30, with a notable 17 Republicans voting for the bill. A joint committee between the House and Senate combined the two bills shortly after, and then-President Bill Clinton signed the bill into law which went into effect in May 1994.

== Provisions ==
=== Definitions ===
Many of the words used in the official text of the Freedom of Access to Clinic Entrances Act are subject to different interpretations. For this reason the Civil Rights Division of the United States Department of Justice provided formal definitions for these terms:

1. Facility—The term "facility" includes a hospital, clinic, physician's office, or other facility that provides reproductive health services, and includes the building or structure in which the facility is located.
2. Interfere with—The term "interfere with" means to restrict a person's freedom of movement.
3. Intimidate—The term "intimidate" means to place a person in reasonable apprehension of bodily harm to him- or herself or to another.
4. Physical obstruction—The term "physical obstruction" means rendering impassable entrance to or exit from a facility that provides reproductive health services or to or from a place of religious worship, or rendering passage to or from such a facility or place of religious worship unreasonably difficult or hazardous.
5. Reproductive health services—The term "reproductive health services" means reproductive health services provided in a hospital, clinic, physician's office, or other facility, and includes medical, surgical, counseling or referral services relating to the human reproductive system, including services relating to pregnancy or the termination of a pregnancy.

=== Prohibited ===
§ 248. Freedom of access to clinic entrances: (a) Prohibited activities.--Whoever-- (1) by force or threat of force or by physical obstruction, intentionally injures, intimidates or interferes with or attempts to injure, intimidate or interfere with any person because that person is or has been, or in order to intimidate such person or any other person or any class of persons from, obtaining or providing reproductive health services

The following behaviors have especially to do with reproductive health care clinics but can also be applied to places of worship:

- Blocking a person’s access to the entrance of a facility
- Impairing cars from entering and/or exiting a facility
- Physically stopping people as they are trying to walk toward an entrance or through a parking lot
- Making it difficult or dangerous to get in and/or out of a facility
- Trespassing on the property of a facility
- Committing any act of violence on a clinic employee, escort or patient
- Vandalism
- Threats of violence
- Stalking a clinic employee or reproductive health care provider
- Arson or threats of arson
- Bombings or bomb threats
- Intimidation

=== Not prohibited ===
The following behaviors are not prohibited because they are protected under the First Amendment right to free speech:

- Protesting outside of clinics
- Distributing literature
- Carrying signs
- Shouting (as long as no threats are made)
- Singing hymns
- Counseling

=== Penalties for violation ===
The criminal penalties for violating FACE vary according to the severity of the offense and the defendant's prior record of similar violations. A first-time offender can be sentenced to a maximum of one year in prison and fined at most $100,000. For a second violation, the violator may be imprisoned for up to three years and fined at most $250,000. However, a strictly non-violent offense is punishable with up to six months in prison and up to $10,000 in fines for a first offense, and up to 18 months in prison and up to $25,000 in fines for subsequent offenses. If the offense causes injury to a person, the maximum sentence is 10 years, regardless of whether or not it is a first offense, and any offense that results in death is punishable with up to life in prison. These are maximum sentences; lesser penalties are permitted at the judge's discretion.

== Impact ==
According to statistics gathered by the National Abortion Federation (NAF), incidents of the more disastrous forms of violence (such as murder, attempted murder, bombing and arson) have decreased since 1994, the year the Freedom of Access to Clinic Entrances Act was enacted. The Clinton administration prosecuted 17 defendants for violations of the FACE act in 1997, and prosecuted an average of about 10 defendants per year since the law was enacted. The George W. Bush administration, by comparison, only prosecuted about two defendants per year for violations of the FACE act. According to Cathleen Mahoney, Executive Vice President of the National Abortion Federation and former attorney for the Justice Department, "The amount of [violent] activity really did drop a lot after FACE was enacted and it was beginning to be enforced".

In July 2022, Republican Representative Ted Budd and Senator Thom Tillis of North Carolina wrote to the state's Attorney General, Josh Stein, asking him to apply the FACE Act to protect CPCs in North Carolina, saying that there was vandalism at the Mountain Area Pregnancy Services facility.

=== Second Trump administration ===
Donald Trump was inaugurated as president on 20 January 2025. On 23 January 2025, Trump pardoned 23 convicted under the FACE Act. A memo dated 24 January 2025 says "future abortion-related FACE Act prosecutions and civil actions will be permitted only in extraordinary circumstances".

In September 2025, the administration sued protesters of an event at a Synagogue in West Orange, New Jersey, under the FACE Act, alleging the "actions were intended to interfere with the synagogue community’s right to freely exercise their religion". The event was a real estate fair for property in the State of Israel and in Israeli settlements.

In February 2026, the administration charged 39 including Nekima Levy Armstrong, Don Lemon, and Georgia Fort under the FACE Act for a protest at Cities Church during Operation Metro Surge. Reportedly, David Easterwood the acting field director of the Saint Paul, Minnesota, ICE field office is a pastor at the church.

In April 2026 the Justice Department issued a report accusing the Biden administration of weaponizing the FACE ACT against anti-abortion activists. The report is a project of the "Weaponization Working Group."

=== Judicial review ===
In 1995, the US District Court for the Eastern District of Virginia upheld the FACE Act against a challenge by the American Life League.

Following passage of the Freedom of Access to Clinic Entrances Act, several states passed analogous laws. The Massachusetts analog, the Reproductive Health Care Facilities Act, was struck down by the Supreme Court in McCullen v. Coakley (2014) as infringing on anti-abortion protesters' First Amendment rights. However, the decision was narrowly tailored to avoid striking down the FACE Act and other state level laws.

== See also ==
- Legal protection of access to abortion
- Timeline of reproductive rights legislation
