= Rajiv Gandhi Memorial =

Memorial to Indian prime minister Rajiv Gandhi

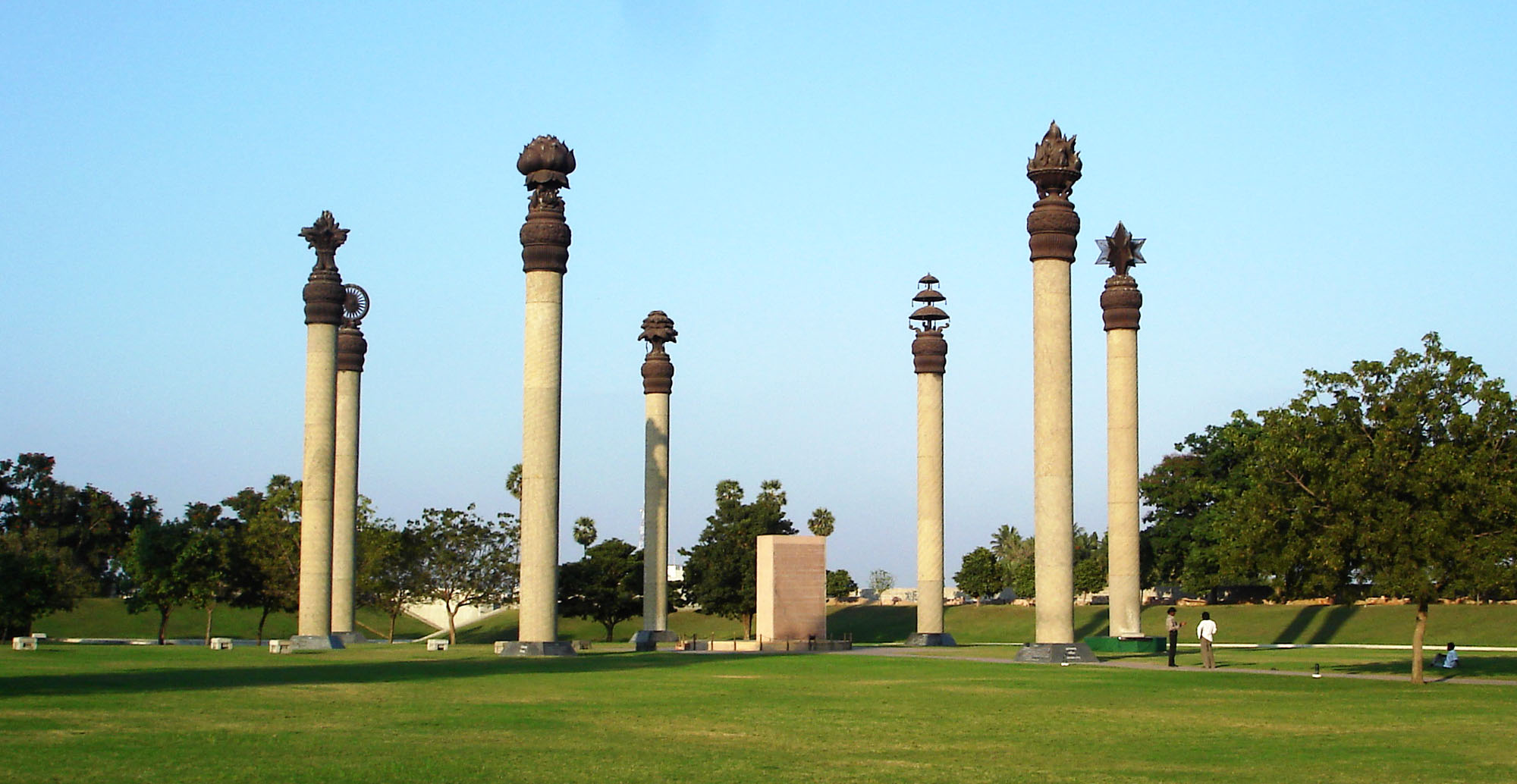
- View of the memorial complex

General information
- Type: Memorial
- Location: Sriperumbudur, Chennai, India
- Coordinates: 12.9605°N 79.9452°E
- Groundbreaking: 2003

Rajiv Gandhi Memorial is a memorial to the former Indian prime minister Rajiv Gandhi in Chennai, India. The memorial is located at Sriperumbudur at the site where he was assassinated on 21 May 1991. It was opened on 10 October 2003 by then President of India A. P. J. Abdul Kalam.

== Background ==
Former Indian prime minister Rajiv Gandhi was assassinated by a suicide bombing in Sriperumbudur in Tamil Nadu, India on 21 May 1991. At least 14 others, in addition to Rajiv and the assassin, were killed. It was carried out by the Sri Lankan Tamil separatist organization Liberation Tigers of Tamil Eelam as a retaliation to the involvement of the Indian Peace Keeping Force in the Sri Lankan civil war.

== Memorial ==
A memorial was planned by the Government of India at the site where Rajiv was assassinated. The Government of Tamil Nadu allocated 12.19 acres (4.93 ha) of land for the memorial in June 1994. It was built at a cost of ₹211.5 million (equivalent to ₹1.5 billion or US$16 million in 2026). It was designed by K T Ravindran, and was built by the Central Public Works Department. It was opened on 10 October 2003 by then President of India A. P. J. Abdul Kalam, in the presence of Rajiv's widow Sonia Gandhi.

== Design ==
At the spot where Rajiv died, a square marble plinth measuring 1.03 m^{2} (11.1 sq ft) stands on a raised platform. The Jaisalmer marble is inlaid with a portrait of Rajiv, and embedded in a pink stone block. The platform is surrounded by seven 15 m (49 ft) high granite pillars each measuring 1.2 m (3 ft 11 in) in diameter. The pillars are mounted by various capital figures made of bronze, which weigh about 1.5 tonnes. The seven pillars were designed to represent the seven concepts in Hinduism namely, dharma, satya, nyaya, vigyan, tyaga, shanti, and samriddhi. They also represent the seven sacred rivers – Ganges, Yamuna, Godavari, Brahmaputra, Narmada, Sindhu, and Kaveri. Various quotations of Rajiv are carved at the base of each pillar.

Towards the south of the memorial is a granite stone wall measuring 45 m (148 ft) in length and 4.8 m (16 ft) in height. The wall consists of bas relief work depicting the transformation of Indian civilization. The wall consists of Rajiv's words, "I am young and I too have a dream...". The path taken by Rajiv before the accident is marked by pink granite stones, leading up to the central plinth. The complex is surrounded by lawns, and various lighting.

== Gallery ==
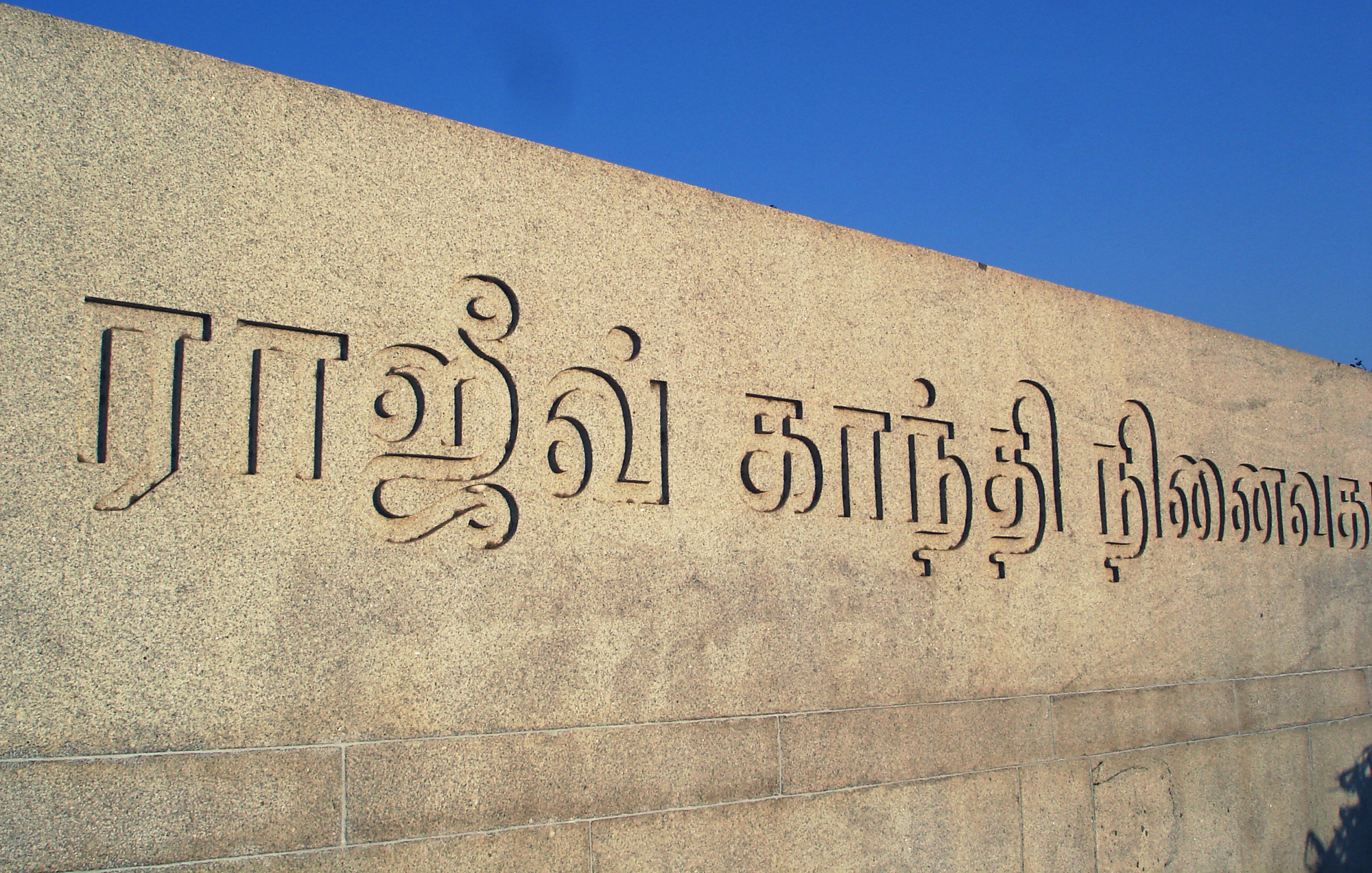
Entrance

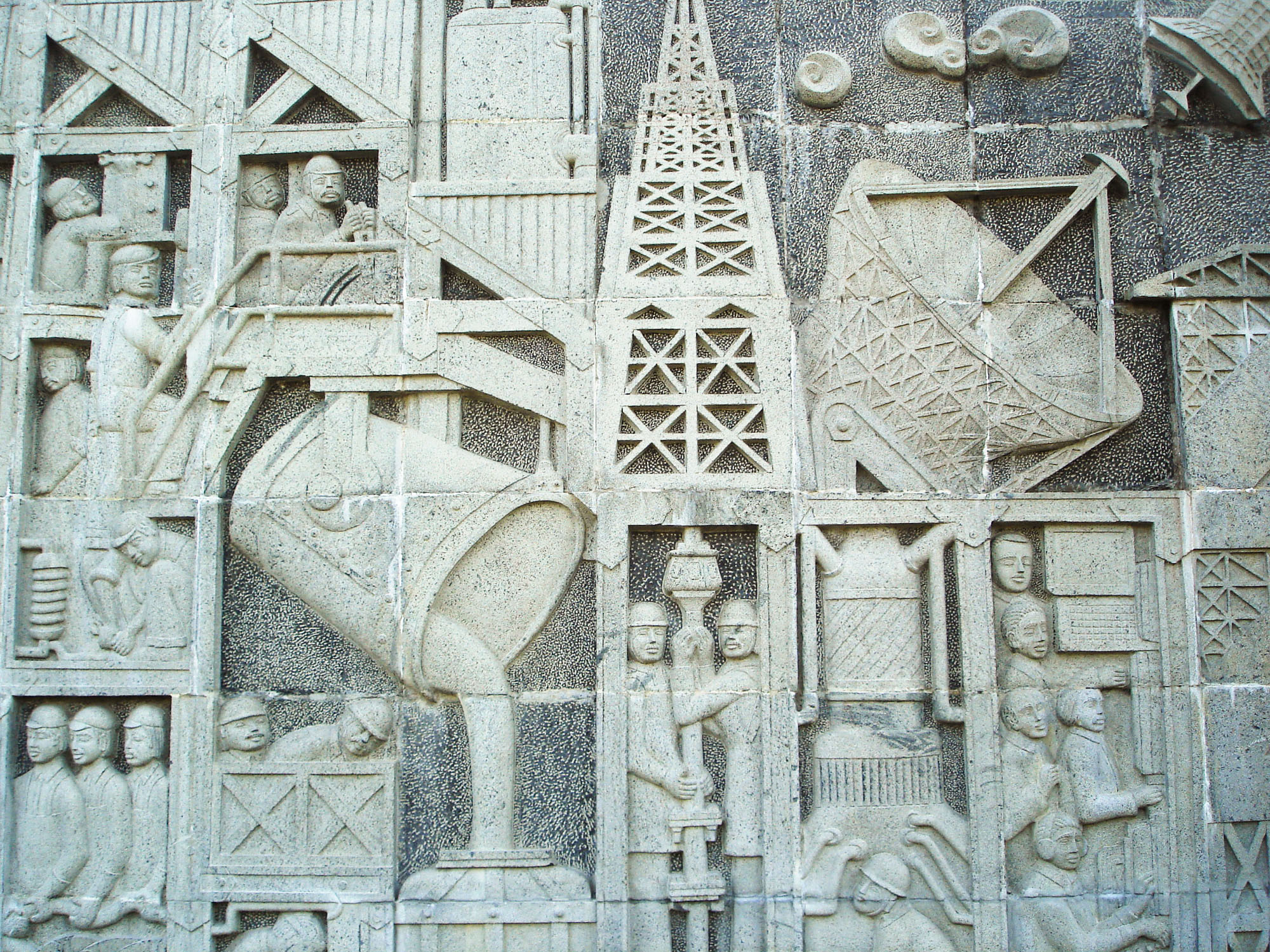
A stone sculpture at the memorial

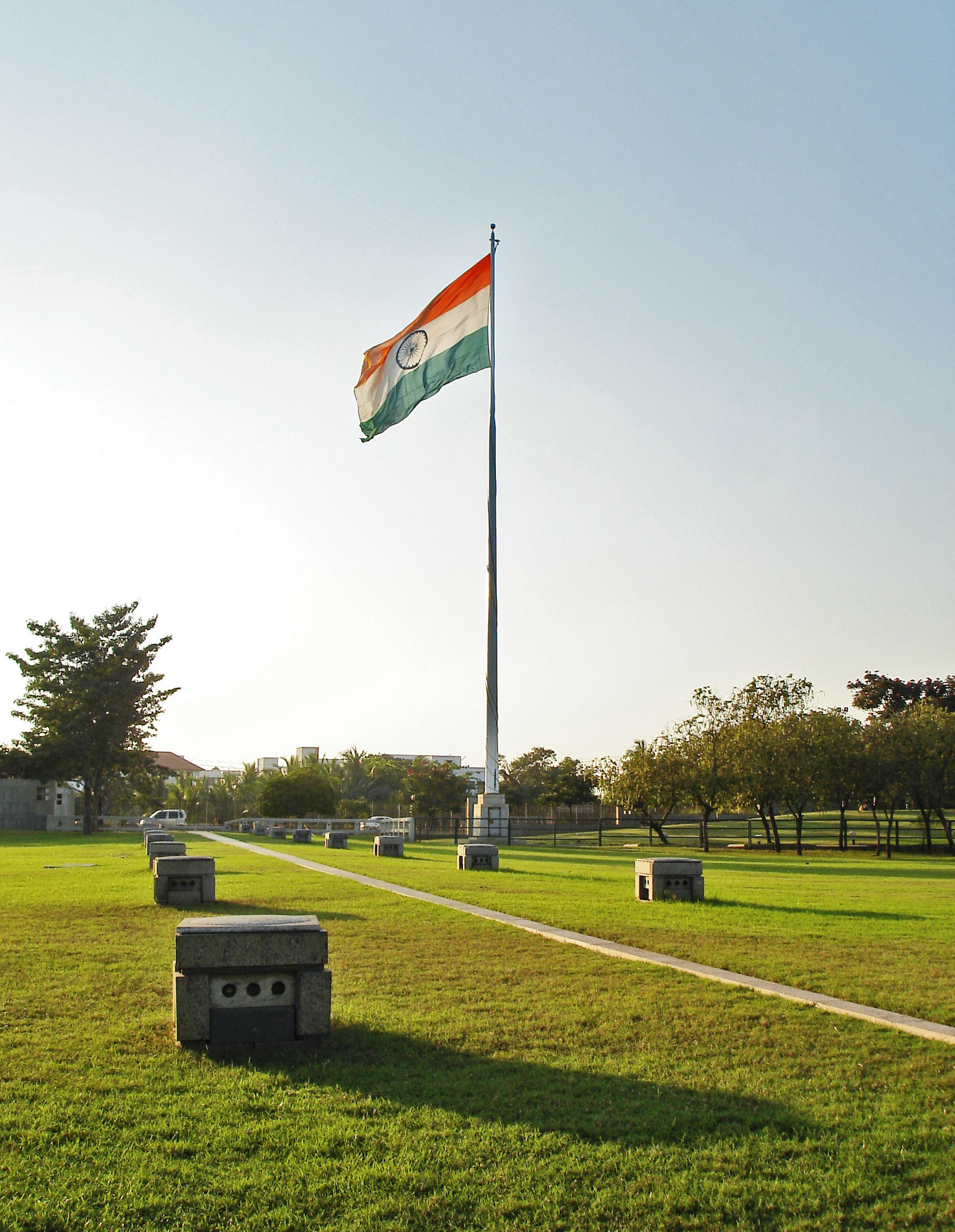
"The path of Light" traces Rajiv Gandhi's final steps with the Indian flag in the background

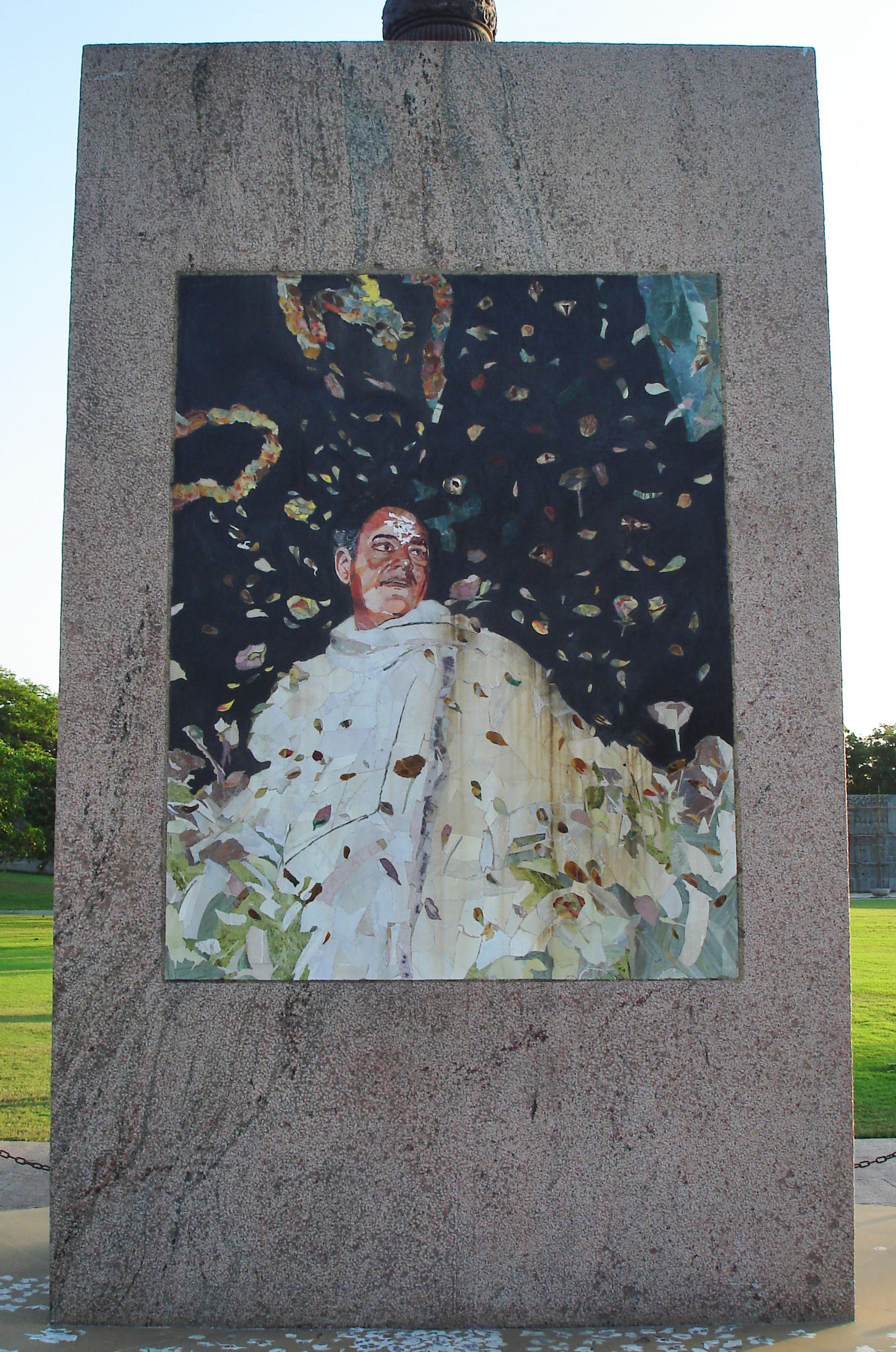
A stone mural marks the spot of his death

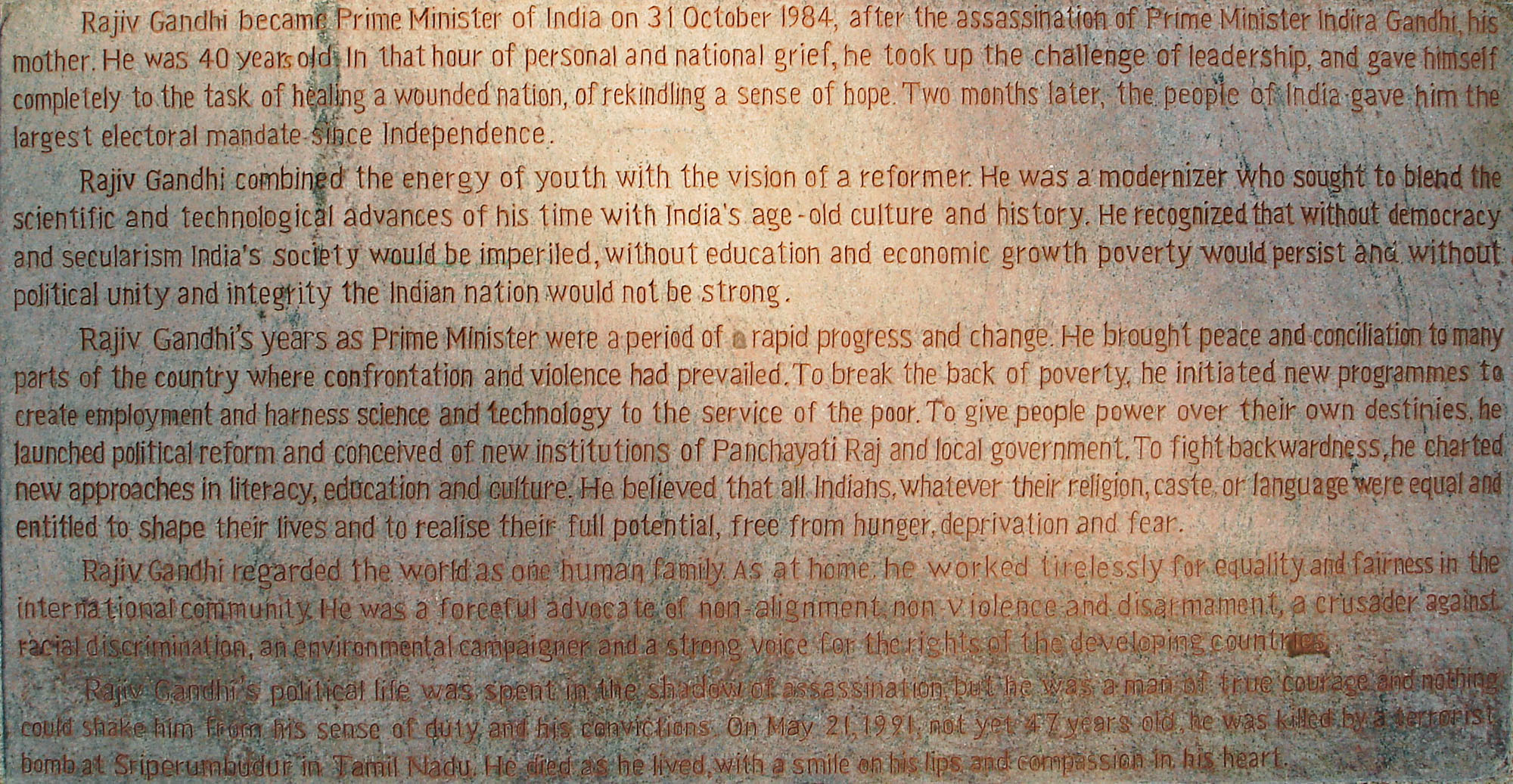
A stone plaque with the history of events
