= Assassination of Rajiv Gandhi =

1991 massacre in Sriperumbudur, India

- Part of the spillover of the Sri Lankan civil war
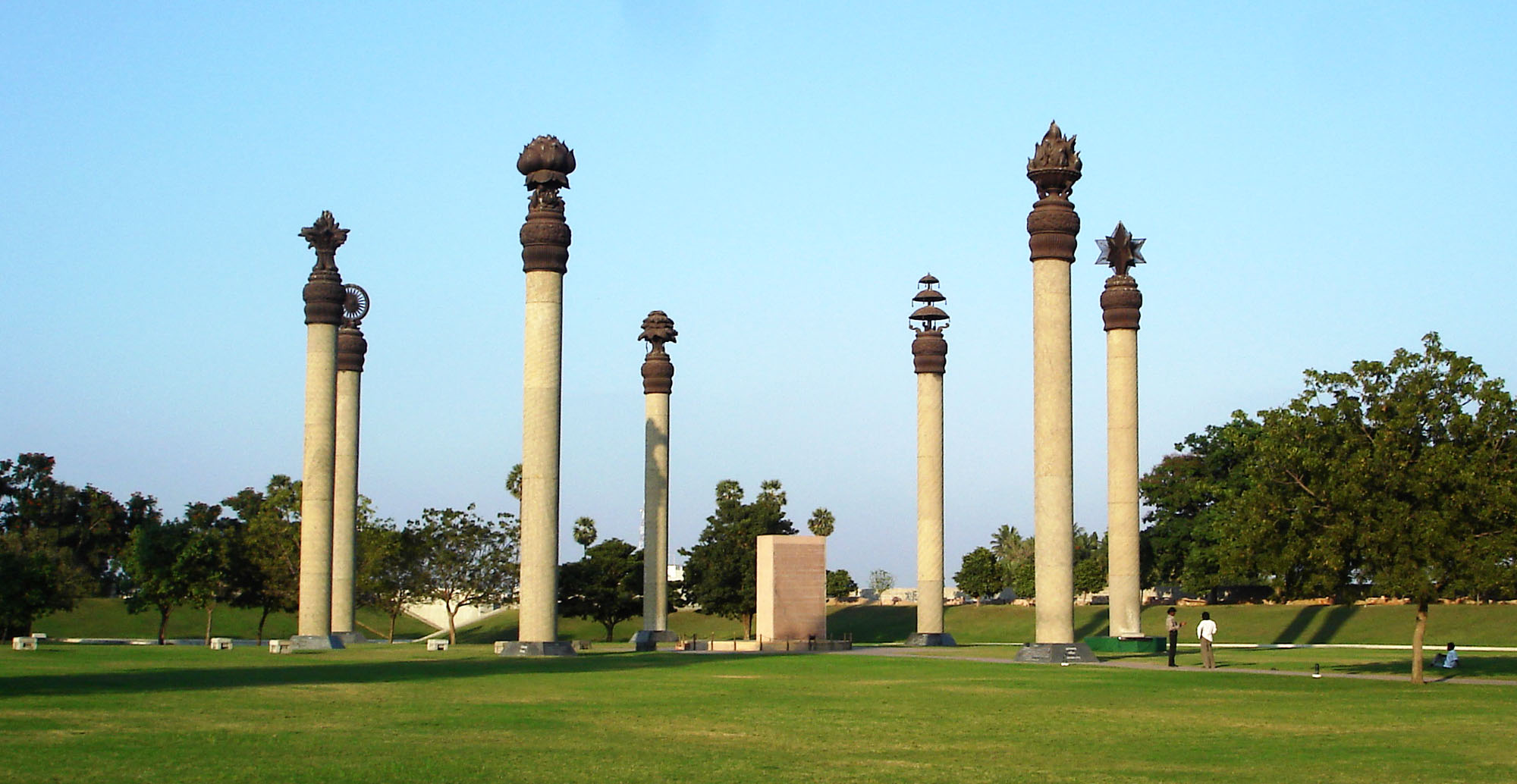
- Seven pillars surround the site of the blast, at the Rajiv Gandhi Memorial in Sriperumbudur
- Location: 12.9602°N 79.9454°E; Sriperumbudur, Tamil Nadu, India
- Date: 21 May 1991; 35 years ago 10:10 pm (IST)
- Attack type: Suicide bombing
- Weapon: RDX explosive belt
- Deaths: 17
- Injuries: 43
- Perpetrator: Liberation Tigers of Tamil Eelam led by Velupillai Prabhakaran
- Assailant: Kalaivani Rajaratnam
- Motive: Murder of Rajiv Gandhi
- Accused: 41
- Charges: Murder, terrorism
- Convicted: 7

Former Indian prime minister Rajiv Gandhi was assassinated by a suicide bombing in Sriperumbudur in Tamil Nadu on 21 May 1991. The incident resulted in the deaths of 17 people including Rajiv Gandhi and the perpetrator, 22-year-old Kalaivani Rajaratnam, a member of the Tamil militant organization Liberation Tigers of Tamil Eelam (LTTE).

When Rajiv Gandhi was the prime minister, he sent the Indian Army as a part of a peace keeping force in 1987 to intervene in the Sri Lankan civil war between the Government of Sri Lanka and the LTTE. The assassination was carried out before the 1991 Indian general election, in which, the Rajiv-led Indian National Congress was projected to win the majority seats. LTTE suspected that if Rajiv won, he would send the Indian forces, which had been pulled out in 1990, back to Sri Lanka.

An extensive investigation was carried out by a Special Investigation Team (SIT) of the Central Bureau of Investigation, led by D. R. Karthikeyan. The SIT named 41 individuals in its initial chargesheet filed on the case. About 25 LTTE members, including the key conspirator Sivarasan and 12 members on the chargesheet, committed suicide during the investigation of the case. Three individuals—including LTTE chief Velupillai Prabhakaran and intelligence chief Pottu Amman—were declared absconding. The other 26 individuals on trial were initially sentenced to death by a TADA court in 1998. However, on subsequent appeal to the Supreme Court of India, only seven were convicted and 19 other were released. Of the seven convicts, the four who were given the death sentence were never hanged, and all were released from prison in 2022.

Subsequent accusations of conspiracy have been addressed by two commissions of inquiry and have brought down at least one national government, the government led by Inder Kumar Gujral in 1998. The Rajiv Gandhi Memorial was opened in 2003 at the site where the bombing took place. The event has been the subject of several books and media.

== Background ==
The Sri Lankan civil war started in 1983 when Sri Lankan Tamil groups engaged in an insurgency against the Government of Sri Lanka. The Liberation Tigers of Tamil Eelam (LTTE), led by Velupillai Prabhakaran, was the foremost of these groups, and sought the formation of an independent state of Tamil Eelam from the northern and eastern portions of Sri Lanka. Both the government and the LTTE were involved in numerous activities of violence during the war. Rajiv Gandhi became the Prime Minister of India in October 1984 after the assassination of his mother, Indira Gandhi. While India has been covertly supporting the Tamil groups earlier, Rajiv Gandhi sought to engage with both the parties to end the war.

The Indo-Lanka Accord was signed on 29 July 1987, and under the terms of the agreement, the Sri Lankan agreement agreed to a devolution of power to the provinces and withdrawal of the army from the Tamil areas and the militant groups were to surrender their arms. India deployed about 6000 troops as a part of the Indian Peace Keeping Force (IPKF) to enforce the terms of the deal. However, both the parties did not trust the Indian forces and failed to honour the deal. The Indian forces, which were ill-prepared and was deployed with the intention of being involved in a peace keeping role for a short duration, was engaged in a protracted war. The IPKF involved nearly 100,000 military personnel and lost 1,166 during its deployment, which ended in 1990.

The Rajiv Gandhi led-Indian National Congress government had lost power in the 1989 Indian general election, and V. P. Singh became the prime minister. However, following the fall of the Chandra Shekhar-led government in March 1991, new elections were called for in 1991. The Congress, led by Rajiv Gandhi, projected itself as a unifying force during the crisis. The LTTE feared that if Rajiv Gandhi was voted back to power, he would again send the Indian Army to Sri Lanka.

== Assassination ==
Rajiv Gandhi was campaigning on behalf of the Congress and its state affiliates ahead of the 1991 general elections. He traveled from Visakhapatnam to Sriperumbudur for a campaign on 21 May 1991. He arrived at Madras Airport at 7:00 pm IST, and was driven to the campaign venue in a white Ambassador car, while greeting crowds along the way. He reached the campaign venue in Sriperumbudur at 10:00 pm where he was to address a meeting supporting Congress candidate Maragatham Chandrasekar. While walking towards the dais surrounded by people who greeted him, a bomb exploded at 10:20 pm.

Initially, it was not clear whether the bomb was hurled towards Rajiv Gandhi or detonated remotely. It was reported that the bomb was placed in a flower basket handed over to him by one of those who greeted him. In the aftermath, no organisation claimed responsibility for the attack. Later, it was ascertained that a suicide bombing was the cause of the blast. The bomber, later identified as Kalaivani Rajaratnam (Dhanu), had disguised herself amongst the crowd, approached and greeted Rajiv Gandhi. When she then bent down to touch his feet, she detonated an explosive belt tucked below her dress.

== Victims ==
The blast resulted in death of 17 people including Rajiv Gandhi and his personal assistant Pradeep Gupta. Among the dead were the suicide bomber Kalaivani Rajaratnam and a local photographer, Haribabu, who was later named as a conspirator in the blast. Others killed in the blast include Munusamy, a former member of the Tamil Nadu Legislative Council, Santhani Begum, a Mahila Congress leader, Latha Kannan, a Mahila Congress worker, and her ten-year-old daughter. Security personnel killed in the blast included Ravichandran from the National Security Guard (NSG), and Tamil Nadu Police personnel–Superintendent of Police K. S. Mohammed Iqbal, Inspectors Rajaguru and Edward Joseph, Constables Chandra, Dharman, and Murugan. Three other people–Ethiraju, Darryl Peters, and Saroja Devi, were also killed in the blast. More than 43 people, including police sub-inspector Anushiya Daisy, were injured in the explosion.

== Aftermath ==
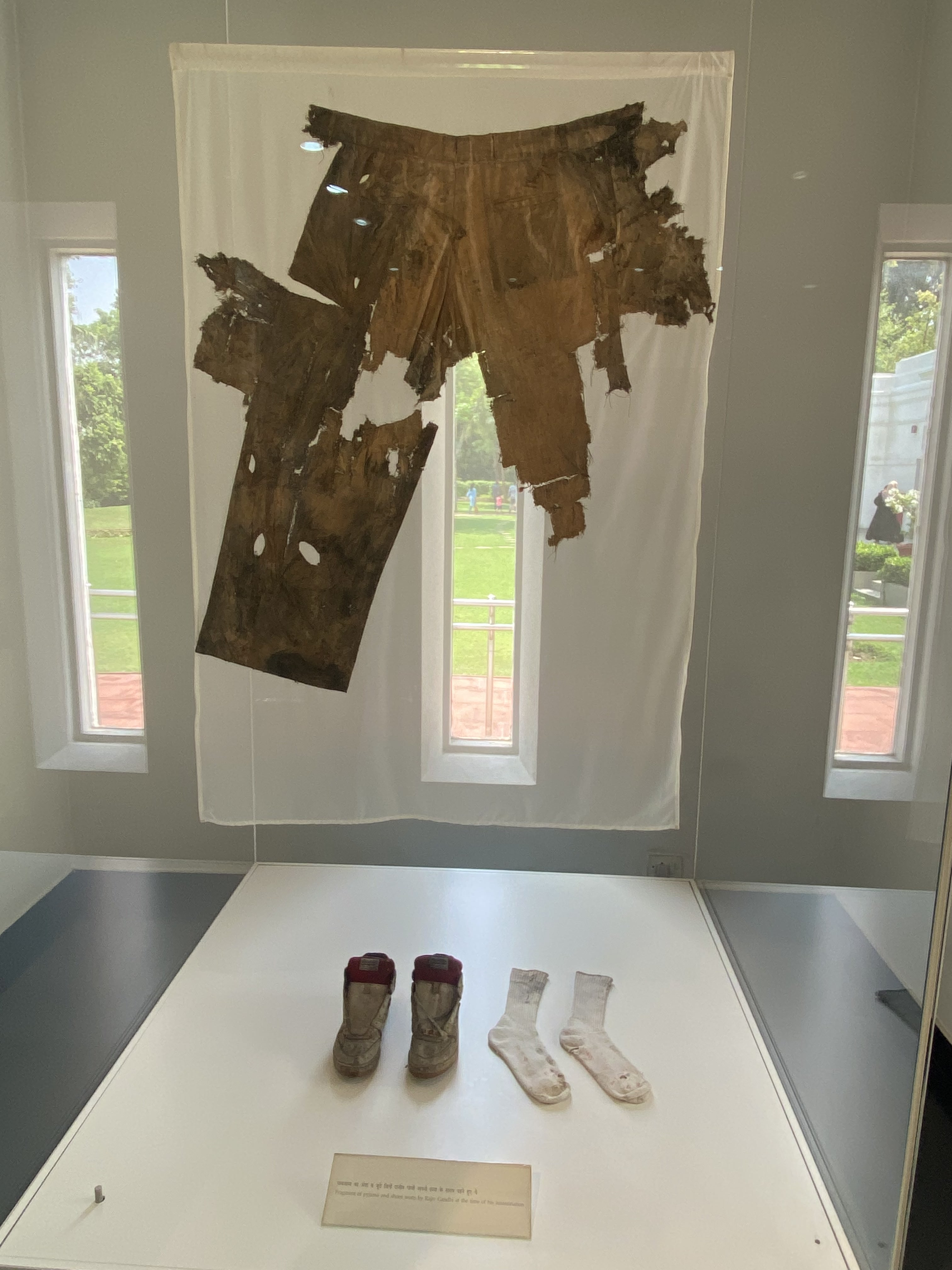
Remains of Rajiv Gandhi's clothing

Security was tightened across major cities in India with reports of minor violence. The next morning, T. N. Seshan, the Chief Election Commissioner of India, announced the postponement of the last two phases of the 1991 elections. The Government of India declared a week of public mourning.

Sonia Gandhi, Rajiv Gandhi's wife, was informed of the incident soon after, and was flown to Madras, along with her daughter, Priyanka Gandhi, the next morning. Rajiv Gandhi's remains were flown to Delhi and was received by President Ramaswamy Venkataraman and Prime Minister Chandra Shekar. The body was sent to the All India Institute of Medical Sciences for an autopsy, reconstruction, and embalming. It was then kept at the Peen Murti House for public viewing. A state funeral was held for Rajiv Gandhi on 24 May 1991 and was attended by dignitaries from several countries. He was cremated on the banks of the Yamuna River.

== Investigation, trial and sentencing ==
=== Preliminary investigation ===
A Special Investigation Team (SIT) of the Central Bureau of Investigation (CBI) was constituted on 24 May 1991 to investigate the case. The team was led by D. R. Karthikeyan, and consisted of Deputy Inspector Generals Amod Kanth and Radha Vinod Raju, Superintendent of Police Amit Verma, Deputy Superintendent of Police K. Ragothaman, Captain A. K. Ravindran of the NSG, and P. Chandrasekharan, the director of the Forensics Lab of Tamil Nadu Police. It was a "blind case" as no one had taken responsibility for the bombing. The LTTE was one of the groups that were suspects in the bombing. The police recovered a camera from the blast site, which was later ascertained to belong to Haribabu, who was hired by the LTTE to record the operation, but died after venturing too close to the epicentre of the blast. The forensic team were able to recover ten photographs from the camera, one of which showed a woman in an orange salwar holding a garland in her hand and was seen moving towards Rajiv Gandhi. It also captured the photo of a man wearing a pyjama and spectacles standing nearby and posing to be a reporter.

Chandrasekharan, who examined the site, and the victims of the blast, ascertained that the assassination was carried out by a suicide bomber, suspected to be the woman with the garland. Denim fragments, purported to have come from a vest, and dismembered remains of the bomber, led to the conclusion that the bomber wore a explosive laden belt. The explosive was determined to be RDX embedded with approximately 10,000 steel pellets, worn on a 8 cm (3.1 in) wide and 65 cm (26 in) long belt, tucked below her dress. The investigative team ascertained that after garlanding Rajiv Gandhi, the bomber bent down to touch his feet and activated the explosive. As Rajiv Gandhi's face bore the brunt of the blast, it was determined that he probably bent to try and stop her from falling at his feet. The police made plaster models based on the severed head to match with the photograph. DNA analysis was performed to try and ascertain details regarding the bomber. The police published the photographs on the newspaper to generate leads.

=== Plot ===
Koneswaran, a young Sri Lankan Tamil man, who was arrested for speeding on his motorbike in Vedaranyam, was investigated due to his suspicious demeanour. He confessed that he was part of the nine-member assassination team that was sent to assassinate Rajiv Gandhi. He further stated that the team was led by Sivarajan, the man with the spectacles seen in one of the photographs, and that they had reached Kodiyakkarai on the Tamil Nadu coast from Jaffna on 1 May 1991. The SIT also recovered phone numbers of Nalini and Robert Payas from a diary belonging to Koneswaran. However, Nalini escaped before the SIT could arrest her.

While Subha Sundaram, Haribabu's mentor asked Haribabu's parents to destroy any evidence he had held, they did not destroy the LTTE propaganda material which he had. Subsequently, based on evidence from an anonymous package containing Haribabu's belongings, the SIT discovered the names of Nalini's partner Murugan and her brother Bhagyanathan. Bhagyanathan and his mother Padma were arrested on 11 June. Bhagyanathan confirmed Sivarajan's role and based on his information, SIT arrested A. G. Perarivalan, Payas, Jayakumar, and Shanmugam, a smuggler, who arranged the explosives used in the blast. Shanmugam's testimony corroborated that his men received the nine member group. Based on Shanmugam's information, the police recovered several cases of explosives and other equipment. Shanmugam later escaped from police custody and was found hanging under doubtful circumstances.

Letters seized by the SIT from Shanmugam's premises confirmed Dhanu and Subha's roles, and the involvement of the LTTE. Further evidence revealed that the assassination was planned by Prabhakaran and LTTE intelligence chief Pottu Amman, which was corroborated later by other former LTTE members. A telephone recording between Prabhakaran and Anton Balasingham, revealed Prabhakaran's plan to kill Rajiv Gandhi, post his meeting with him at Delhi. Meanwhile, LTTE members Athirai and S. Kanagasabapathy were arrested in Delhi.

Interrogation of Payas and Jayakumar revealed that Pottu Amman had planned the assassination of Rajiv Gandhi at Delhi. However, as Sivarasan was confident of accomplishing it in Madras, the Delhi plan was used as a back up. Athirai was sent to Delhi for the purpose, posing as the grand daughter of Kanagasabapathy. They also revealed that team planned to infiltrate a travel agency in Delhi run by a relative of a senior Congress politician. However, the politician denied any links and further investigation of the arrested members of the LTTE did not yield a clear connection between the LTTE and any of the members of the Congress party. Evidence also pointed out that the team conducted a test run of their plot at a meeting attended by former prime minister V.P. Singh in Madras on 7 May 1991.

=== Manhunt ===
The SIT launched a manhunt to arrest the remaining eight members of the assassination team and those who helped them. On 14 June 1991, Nalini and Murugan were arrested after a brief stand-off between Murugan and Ravindran of the NSG. Based on the information provided by them, the SIT tracked down LTTE members Gundu Santhan, Arasan and Kulathan to Tiruchirappalli. However, they committed suicide by consuming cyanide, which LTTE cadres often carried with themselves. While the NSG team was equipped with cyanide antidote kits, it proved useless as death occurred within a few minutes after consuming cyanide. The SIT tracked Nehru's radio transmissions to the LTTE headquarters in Sri Lanka, however, they were unable to located him.

On 28 June 1991, Sivarasan, Subha and Nehru escaped in an empty oil tanker from Madras to Bangalore. On 29 July, the police tracked Dixon, an LTTE cadre who supported the operation, in Coimbatore, but he committed suicide. In August, the SIT received information of Sivarasan's escape to Bangalore. While the LTTE tried various methods to extract the remaining members and move them to Sri Lanka, it proved futile. The SIT tracked Sivarasan and his accomplices to a house in Konanakunte on the outskirts of Bangalore. On 18 August, the SIT raided the house and found that five LTTE cadres–Suresh Master, Amman, Nehru, Jamuna, and the boat driver, had committed suicide by swallowing cyanide. Sivarasan had shot Subha before committing suicide. The SIT arrested several other LTTE members and sympathisers in connection with case. On 29 August, the SIT detained Rangan, the last person to be arrested in connection with the case.

=== Perpetrators ===
On 20 May 1992, The SIT filed a chargesheet against 41 people with respect to the bombing. The nine member group, led by Sivarasan, consisted of the bomber Dhanu, her back up Subha, wireless operator Nehru, Santhan, Koneswaran, Vijayanandan, Ruban, and the boat driver. Sivarasan, born in 1958, was the leader of the assassination team. Dhanu was born on 26 July 1968 in Kaithady, and was also known as Thenmozhi. She was the daughter of A. Rajaratnam, who was described as LTTE chief Prabhakaran's mentor. Dhanu, Subha, and Athirai were part of the Black Tigers, the suicide bomber unit of the LTTE.

Of the 41 accused, three LTTE members–chief Prabakaran, intelligence chief Pottu Amman, and Akila, head of the women's intelligence wing, were not arrested and were declared absconders, and 12 people had died. Dhanu and Haribabu were killed in the blast. Shanmugam, Gundu Santhan, and Dixon committed suicide in separate incidents. Sivarasan, Subha, Nehru, Suresh, Amman, Jamuna, and the boat driver, died during their encounter with the SIT in the outskirts of Bangalore. Of the remaining 26 accused, Murugan constructed the bomb with the equipment supplied by Perarivalan. Nalini, Ravichandran, Payas and his brother in law Jayakumar were accused on providing shelter to the conspirators, and Santhan was in charge of logistics.

The other accused included Koneswaran, Vijayanandan, and Ruban, who were part of the nine member team, and Kanagasabapathy and Athirai, who were the members of the back up team. Bhagyanathan was accused of providing support and brainwashing his sister Nalini and their mother Padma to join the plot. The remaining 19 people were charged with supporting the assassination plot. These included Shanmugavadivelu, who managed the financing, Duraisingam, who served as a messenger between the LTTE leadership in Sri Lanka and the assassination team, Dhanasekharan, who provided the oil tanker to facilitate the escape of Sivarasan to Bangalore, and Ranganath, who sheltered Sivarasan in Bangalore. Others charged included Sri Lankan nationals Shanthi (Jayakumar's wife), Vijayan, Baskaran, Sevulaxmi (Baskaran's daughter and Vijayan's wife), Rangan, Vigneswaran, and Suseendran, who provided support to the execution of the plot.

=== Trial and sentencing ===
The trial was held under the Terrorist and Disruptive Activities Act (TADA). The pretrial began in May 1993 before the designated TADA court at Poonamallee in Madras. The pretrial concluded in November 1993 and the trial began in January 1994. In May 1994, Prabhakaran, Pottu Amman, and Akila were declared as absconding and the Government of India asked the Sri Lankan government to extradite them. The trial ended on 5 November 1997 and the judgement was delivered on 28 January 1997. Excluding the three declared as absconding and the 12 people who had died, the judge declared all the other 26 of the accused as guilty under the Indian Penal Code for murder and conspiracy to commit murder and for terrorism under the TADA. The court sentenced all 26 accused to death.

Legal opinion was divided on the verdict. The trial was held behind closed doors and as per the provisions of TADA, confessions given by the accused to the Superintendent of Police are considered as evidence against the accused. As per Amnesty International, the provisions of the act deprived the defendants of certain rights which would have been there in a fair trial. Under the TADA, the judgement of the TADA court can only be appealed to the Supreme Court of India. The convicts appealed against the verdict in the Supreme Court, citing that the confessions by the accused formed a major part of the evidence in the judgment against them which they claimed were taken under duress.

The three judge bench of the Supreme Court, consisting of K. T. Thomas, D.P. Wadhwa, and Syed Shah Mohammed Quadri, delivered its verdict on 11 May 1999. The Supreme Court stated that there was nothing on record to show that the intention to kill Rajiv Gandhi was to overawe the government, and hence it held that it was not a terrorist act under TADA. It further stated that the decision to kill Rajiv Gandhi was precipitated by his interview to a magazine in August 1990, in which he stated that he would send the Indian Army to disarm the LTTE if he returned to power and was aimed at preventing him from coming to power again. The Supreme Court convicted seven of the 26 accused, Perarivalan, Murugan, Nalini, Jayakumar, Payas, Ravichandran, and Santhan, while releasing the 19 others due to lack of evidence and direct connection to the assassination. While Perarivalan, Murugan, and Santhan were unanimously sentenced to death, the three judges disagreed on the sentences for the other four convicts. By majority verdict, Nalini was sentenced to death and the other three were sentenced to life imprisonment.

=== Imprisonment and release ===
The Supreme Court rejected the review petition in October 1999. Nalini later gave birth to a girl in prison. On 24 April 2000, her sentence was commuted to life imprisonment by the Governor of Tamil Nadu on humanitarian grounds. She later expressed regret for her role in the killing of Rajiv Gandhi. In 2010, Nalini moved the Madras High Court seeking release as she had served more than 20 years in prison. The request was rejected, and she was moved to Vellore Central Jail. In August 2011, the president rejected the mercy petition of the three inmates on death row. While the execution of these three was scheduled on 9 September 2011, the three accused filed a review petition in the Madras High Court, which stayed the execution for eight weeks and transferred the case to the Supreme Court.

On 18 February 2014, the Supreme Court bench led by Chief Justice P. Sathasivam commuted the death sentence of the three accused to life imprisonment citing the mental agony due to the inordinate delay in carrying out the death penalty. After Perarivalan's request for release in December 2015, the Cabinet of Tamil Nadu passed a resolution agreeing to his release on 9 September 2018 and forwarded it to the governor. While the governor forwarded the petition to the president in January 2021, it was kept undecided. On 9 March 2022, the Supreme Court granted bail to Perarivalan, and subsequently ordered his release on 18 May 2022. After Nalini and Ravichandran filed similar petitions for release in August 2022, the Supreme Court released the remaining convicts based on a recommendation from the Government of Tamil Nadu. After their release, Sri Lankan nationals Murugan, Payas, and Jayakumar, were moved to a refugee camp in Tirchirappalli, and later deported to Sri Lanka in April 2024.

== Cause ==
As per media reports, certain procedures for VVIP security were not followed during the event. The perimeter was not secured and people were allowed to get too close to Rajiv Gandhi. However, an inquiry commission headed by judge J. S. Verma, formed to look into the security lapses that contributed to the assassination, submitted its final report in June 1992, which concluded that the security arrangements were adequate but the rules were flouted by the local Congress leaders. In a bid to show his closeness to the people, Rajiv Gandhi often flouted security norms and frequently encouraged people to approach him. He had been warned of the risks by security agencies multiple times. A police officer, who was on duty during the incident, later said that she tried to prevent Dhanu from reaching Rajiv Gandhi and Rajiv Gandhi asked her to allow Dhanu to come closer to him. The Verma committee report was initially rejected by the P. V. Narasimha Rao-led union government. Though the report was later accepted, no action was taken on the recommendations of the commission.

Then Governor of Tamil Nadu, Bhishma Narain Singh, broke official protocol and had twice warned Rajiv Gandhi about the threat to his life if he visited the state. Vazhappady K. Ramamurthy, then president of the Tamil Nadu Congress Committee, later shared a letter, purportedly written by the LTTE, threatening to kill him and Rajiv Gandhi. However, in the months preceding the event, Rajiv Gandhi was met twice by LTTE delegations which assured that there was no threat to his life in Tamil Nadu, which led him to plan a rally in the state.

== Conspiracies ==
A one-man inquiry commission consisting of Milap Chand Jain was formed on 23 August 1991 to investigate the conspiracy behind the assassination. It submitted its interim report in August 1997 after several extensions, and the final report was presented before the Parliament of India on 31 July 1998. The Commission investigated several conspiracy theories and named several people and agencies as suspected of having been involved in the assassination.

The Commission report criticised that the Dravida Munnetra Kazhagam (DMK) government in Tamil Nadu allowed the LTTE to freely operate in Tamil Nadu in the late 1980s despite their criminal activities. It also claimed that LTTE leaders had access to sensitive information and communications between the central and Tamil Nadu state governments. The report suspected cleric Chandraswami of financing the assassination, which was echoed later by one of the convicts in the case. In a report published on 30 October 2012, K. Ragothaman, one of the investigators of the CBI, in his book Conspiracy to Kill Rajiv Gandhi: From the CBI Files mentions that the CBI started a preliminary inquiry in which M. K. Narayanan, former director of the Intelligence Bureau, was suspected to have hidden a video evidence, and the case was buried by the SIT chief Karthikeyan.

== Impact and responses ==
As the assassination happened in the middle of the 1991 elections, it had an impact on the elections. The Congress, which was engaged in a close contest with the Bharatiya Janata Party and the Janata Dal, was expected to gain in the final two phases of polling that were held after the event. Though the Congress did not get a majority, it won the most number of seats. The Congress party transitioned from the leadership of the Nehru-Gandhi family to Narasimha Rao, who was sworn in as the Prime Minister of India.

The interim report of the Jain Commission, which accused the DMK of having a role in the assassination, brought down the union government of I. K. Gujral in early 1998. The Congress, which was supporting the government from the outside, demanded the removal of the three DMK ministers from the union cabinet. After Prime Minister Gujral's refusal, the Congress withdrew support, which led to the dissolution of the Parliament and fresh elections.

On 10 April 2002, Prabhakaran called the event as tragic without confirming the LTTE's role in the plot. In a 2006 interview, Balasingham told NDTV that the assassination was a "monumental and historical tragedy" and that the LTTE deeply regretted it. In a 2011 interview, Selvarasa Pathmanathan, a former member of the LTTE, apologised to India for Prabhakaran's "mistake" of killing Rajiv Gandhi while confirming the role of LTTE.

== Memorial and popular culture ==
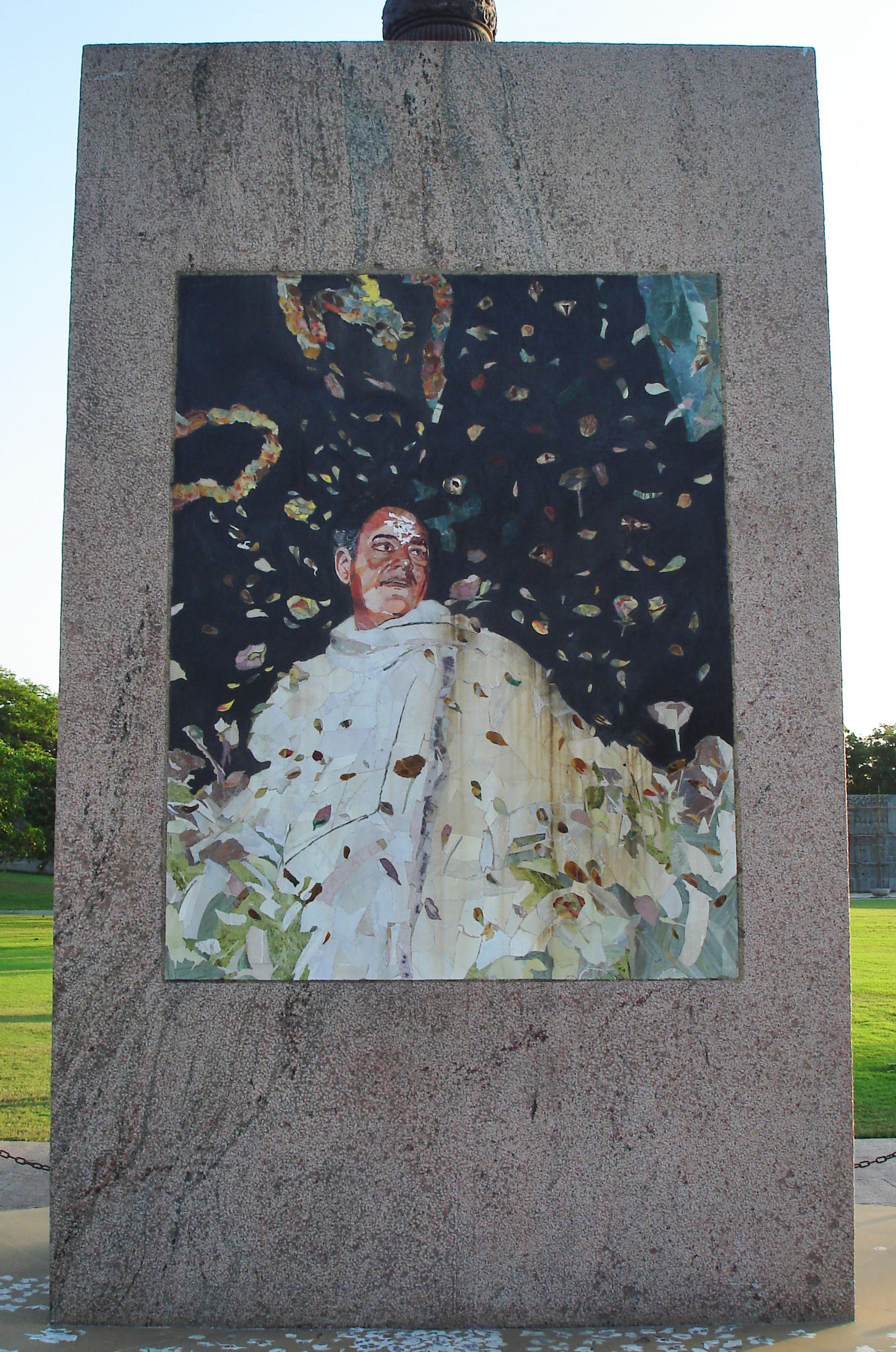
Stone mosaic at Rajiv Gandhi Memorial

Veer Bhumi ("Land of the Brave") is the memorial of Rajiv Gandhi, located on the banks of the Yamuna, where he was cremated. A memorial was planned by the Government of India at the site where Rajiv was assassinated. The Government of Tamil Nadu allocated 12.19 acres (4.93 ha) of land for the memorial in June 1994. It was built by the Central Public Works Department at a cost of ₹211.5 million (equivalent to ₹1.5 billion or US$16 million in 2026). It was opened on 10 October 2003 by President APJ Abdul Kalam.

Several books have been written on the incident including by those involved in the investigation of the case. The incident has been depicted as part of several feature films and television series. The Hunt: The Rajiv Gandhi Assassination Case was a 2025 series based on the investigation of the case.

== See also ==
- Assassination of Indira Gandhi – 1984 assassination of Indian prime minister
- Assassination of Ranasinghe Premadasa – 1993 murder in Colombo, Sri Lanka
