= Abbey College =

Abbey College may refer to:

- Abbey College, Malvern, an international boarding school in Malvern, Worcestershire, England
- Abbey College, Ramsey, a comprehensive secondary school in Ramsey, Cambridgeshire, England
- Belmont Abbey College, a private liberal-arts college in Belmont, North Carolina, US
- Colleges of the University of Otago (redirected from Abbey College, Otago)
- Newbattle Abbey (redirected from Newbattle Abbey College) a former monastery near Newbattle, Midlothian, Scotland

== See also ==
- Abbey DLD Colleges Group, UK
