= Samriddhi (disambiguation) =

Samriddhi is an Indian student business conference.

Samriddhi (lit. 'prosperity' in Sanskrit) may also refer to:

- Samriddhi The Prosperity Foundation, an independent public policy institute based in Kathmandu, Nepal
- Samruddhi Mahamarg or the Mumbai–Nagpur Expressway, Maharashtra, India
- Samruddhi Manjunath, an Indian politician
- Samriddhi Mehra, an Indian actress
- Samridhii Shukla, an Indian television actress and voice-over artist
