= A. G. Perarivalan =

Indian convicted of murder in the assassination of Rajiv Gandhi (born 1971)

A. G. Perarivaalan
- Born: Perarivaalan; 30 July 1971 (age 55); Jolarpettai, Tirupattur District, Tamil Nadu, India
- Other name: Arivu
- Convictions: Conspiracy (IPC 120-B); Murder (IPC 302)
- Criminal charges: Bought and supplied two batteries which were used to detonate the bomb that killed Rajiv Gandhi

A. G. Perarivalan (born 30 July 1971) is an Indian man who was convicted for his involvement in the assassination of Rajiv Gandhi. He was sentenced to life imprisonment along with Murugan and Santhan who were other two convicts from the same case. The Supreme Court ordered the release of Perarivalan on 18 May 2022 after he spent over 30 years in jail.

== Early life and education ==
Perarivalan was born on 30 July 1971 in Jolarpet, Tamil Nadu to Gnanasekaran alias Kuyildasan and Arputham Ammal. His parents were followers of "Periyar" E.V. Ramasamy, the founder of Dravidian movement in Tamil Nadu. Perarivalan did well in school. Perarivalan was the second highest scorer in the school in the 10th standard public examination. After completing class 10, Perarivalan joined the Diploma course (DECE) in Electronics and Communication Technology and completed it. After completing his diploma course, he worked in the computer department in the office of the Viduthalai Daily magazine located at Periyar Thidal in Chennai.

He completed his bachelor of computer applications and master of computer applications degrees through the Indira Gandhi National Open University while still in prison. In 2012, he scored highest ever mark among prisoners in Plus Two examination with 91.33 per cent. In 2013, he got gold medal by topping a diploma course examination conducted by the Tamil Nadu Open University.

== Arrest and sentence ==
He was arrested on 11 June 1991 at Periyar Thidal, Chennai by Central Bureau of Investigation officers. He was charged with providing a 9-volt battery for the explosive device to assassination conspirator Sivarasan. His death penalty was commuted to life term imprisonment after a Supreme Court verdict on 18 February 2014. According to the CBI, Perarivalan confessed on 14 August 1991, and 15 August 1991 to purchasing the batteries making him the main suspect. Perarivalan has stated that his confession statements were distorted. He has since said that he was unaware of the purpose for which he was buying the batteries, and has consistently maintained his innocence. Perarivalan would repeatedly say during his time in jail that giving a battery shouldn't equate to him knowing about the plot.

== Legal journey ==
Perarivalan's case took a turn in 2013 when V. Thiagarajan, a former CBI superintendent of police, acknowledged to tampering with his confession in a documentary by filmmakers from the People's Movement Against the Death Penalty, that he did not take down his statement verbatim.

In 2018, the Tamil Nadu cabinet unanimously passed and delivered a resolution to Governor Banwarilal Purohit requesting the release of all seven inmates. Three years later, the central government told the Supreme Court (which called the governor's delaying extraordinary) that he was waiting for the Multi-Disciplinary Monitoring Agency—the CBI's Research and Analysis Wing to probe into the bigger plot behind the assassination to be finished. The Supreme Court handed the governor a week to decide in January 2021, but he stated that the President had sole jurisdiction over remission.

== Release ==
On 19 February 2014, Government of Tamil Nadu announced its decision to release him along with six other convicts. Having been granted bail by the Supreme Court, Perarivalan was released on bail on 15 March 2022. After 3 decades of wait, the supreme Court uttered a historical verdict of releasing A.G Perarivalan on 18 May 2022. The Supreme Court criticized Tamil Nadu Governor for sitting on the recommendation by the state government to remit Perarivalan's sentence for almost two-and-a-half years.

Activists of Pro-Tamil outfits came out on the streets in several parts of the state, raising slogans hailing the Supreme court verdict. Majority of political parties in Tamil Nadu welcomed the Supreme Court's verdict.

In May 2022, Tamil Nadu Chief Minister M. K. Stalin hailed the release of Perarivalan and hugged him on his visit of gratitude at the Chennai airport. Perarivalan, along with his mother, Arputham, also met AIADMK coordinator O. Panneerselvam and co-coordinator Edappadi K. Palaniswami. They both went on to meet several other leaders belonging to different parties including Thol. Thirumavalavan, Vaiko and Seeman. His release was welcomed by S. Ramadoss. The Tamil Nadu Congress and BJP, however, separately questioned the celebrations after his release.

== Book ==
- An Appeal from the Death Row (Rajiv Murder Case – The Truth Speaks) (OCLC 230730652) – The book was released by Communist Party of India general secretary A. B. Bardhan, in English, Tamil and Hindi versions.
