= Rajiv Gandhi =

Prime Minister of India from 1984 to 1989

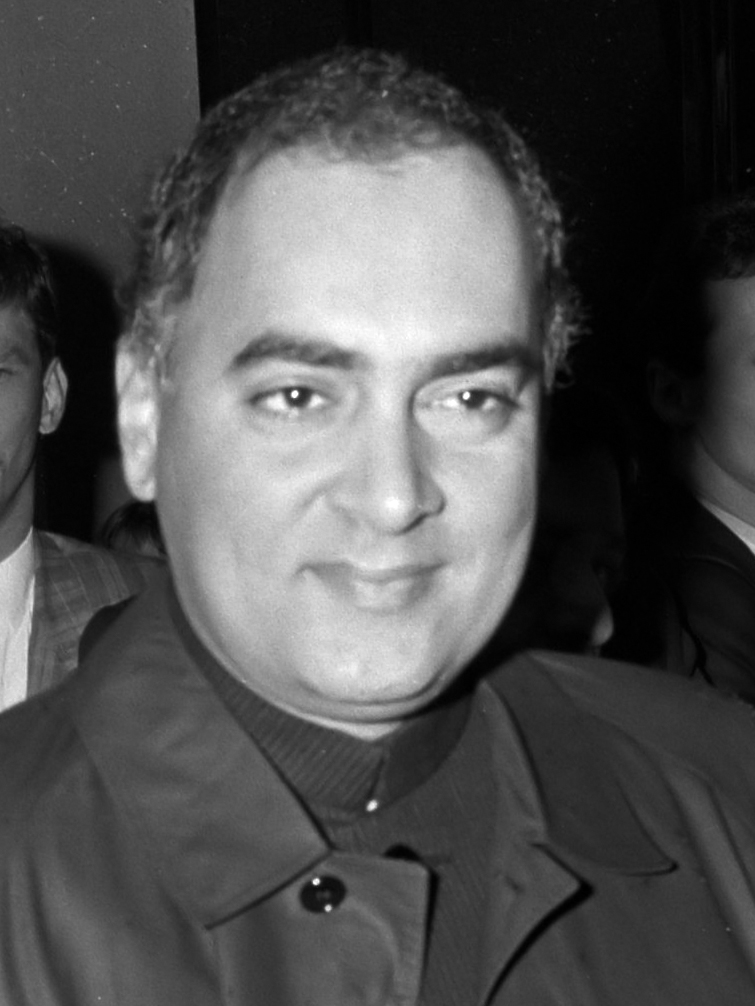
- Rajiv Gandhi in 1987

Prime Minister of India
- In office 31 October 1984 – 2 December 1989
- President: Zail Singh; Ramaswamy Venkataraman
- Vice President: Ramaswamy Venkataraman; Shankar Dayal Sharma
- Preceded by: Indira Gandhi
- Succeeded by: Vishwanath Pratap Singh

Leader of the Opposition in Lok Sabha
- In office 18 December 1989 – 23 December 1990
- Prime Minister: Vishwanath Pratap Singh
- Preceded by: Jagjivan Ram
- Succeeded by: L. K. Advani

President of the Indian National Congress
- In office 28 December 1985 – 21 May 1991
- Preceded by: Indira Gandhi
- Succeeded by: P. V. Narasimha Rao

Member of Parliament, Lok Sabha
- In office 17 August 1981 – 21 May 1991
- Preceded by: Sanjay Gandhi
- Succeeded by: Satish Sharma
- Constituency: Amethi, Uttar Pradesh

Personal details
- Born: Rajiv Ratna Gandhi; 20 August 1944 Bombay, British Raj
- Died: 21 May 1991 (aged 46) Sriperumbudur, Tamil Nadu, India
- Cause of death: Assassination
- Party: Indian National Congress
- Spouse: Sonia Maino (m. 1968)
- Children: Rahul; Priyanka
- Parents: Feroze Gandhi (father); Indira Gandhi (mother)
- Relatives: Nehru–Gandhi family
- Education: Trinity College, Cambridge (dropped out); Imperial College London (dropped out)
- Occupation: Politician; aircraft pilot
- Awards: Bharat Ratna (1991)
- Monuments: Vir Bhumi

Rajiv Ratna Gandhi (Note: English: /ˈrɑːdʒiːv ˈɡɑːndi/ RAH-jeev GAHN-dee, Hindi: [raːˈdʒiːʋ ˈɡaːndʱiː].) (20 August 1944 – 21 May 1991) was an Indian aircraft pilot, technocrat and statesman who served as the prime minister of India from 1984 to 1989 for two terms. He took office after the assassination of his mother, then–prime minister Indira Gandhi, to become the youngest Indian prime minister at the age of 40. He served until his defeat at the 1989 election, and then became Leader of the Opposition in Lok Sabha, resigning in December 1990, six months before his own assassination.

Gandhi was not related to Mahatma Gandhi. Instead, he was from the politically powerful Nehru–Gandhi family, which had been associated with the Indian National Congress party. For much of his childhood, his maternal grandfather Jawaharlal Nehru was prime minister. Gandhi attended The Doon School, an elite boarding institution, and then the University of Cambridge in the United Kingdom. He returned to India in 1966 and became a professional pilot for the state-owned Indian Airlines. In 1968, he married Sonia Maino; the couple settled in Delhi for a domestic life with their children Rahul and Priyanka. For much of the 1960s and 1970s, his mother was prime minister and his younger brother Sanjay an MP; despite this, Gandhi remained apolitical.

After Sanjay died in a plane crash in 1980, Gandhi reluctantly entered politics at the behest of his mother. The following year he won his brother's Parliamentary seat of Amethi and became a member of the Lok Sabha, the lower house of India's Parliament. As part of his political grooming, Rajiv was made general secretary of the Congress party and given significant responsibility in organising the 1982 Asian Games.

On the morning of 31 October 1984, his mother (the then prime minister) was assassinated by her two Sikh bodyguards Satwant Singh and Beant Singh in the aftermath of Operation Blue Star, an Indian military action to remove Sikh separatist activists from the Golden Temple. Later that day, Gandhi was appointed prime minister. His leadership was tested over the next few days as organised mobs rioted against the Sikh community, resulting in anti-Sikh massacres in Delhi. That December, the Congress party won the largest Lok Sabha majority to date, 414 seats out of 541. Gandhi's period in office was mired in controversies such as Bhopal disaster, Bofors scandal and Mohd. Ahmed Khan v. Shah Bano Begum. In 1988, he reversed the coup in Maldives, antagonising militant Tamil groups such as PLOTE, intervening and then sending peacekeeping troops to Sri Lanka in 1987, leading to open conflict with the Liberation Tigers of Tamil Eelam (LTTE). His party was defeated in the 1989 election.

Gandhi remained Congress president until the elections in 1991. While campaigning for the elections, he was assassinated by a suicide bomber from the LTTE. In 1991, the Indian government posthumously awarded Gandhi the Bharat Ratna, the country's highest civilian award. At the India Leadership Conclave in 2009, the Revolutionary Leader of Modern India award was conferred posthumously on Gandhi.

== Early life and career ==
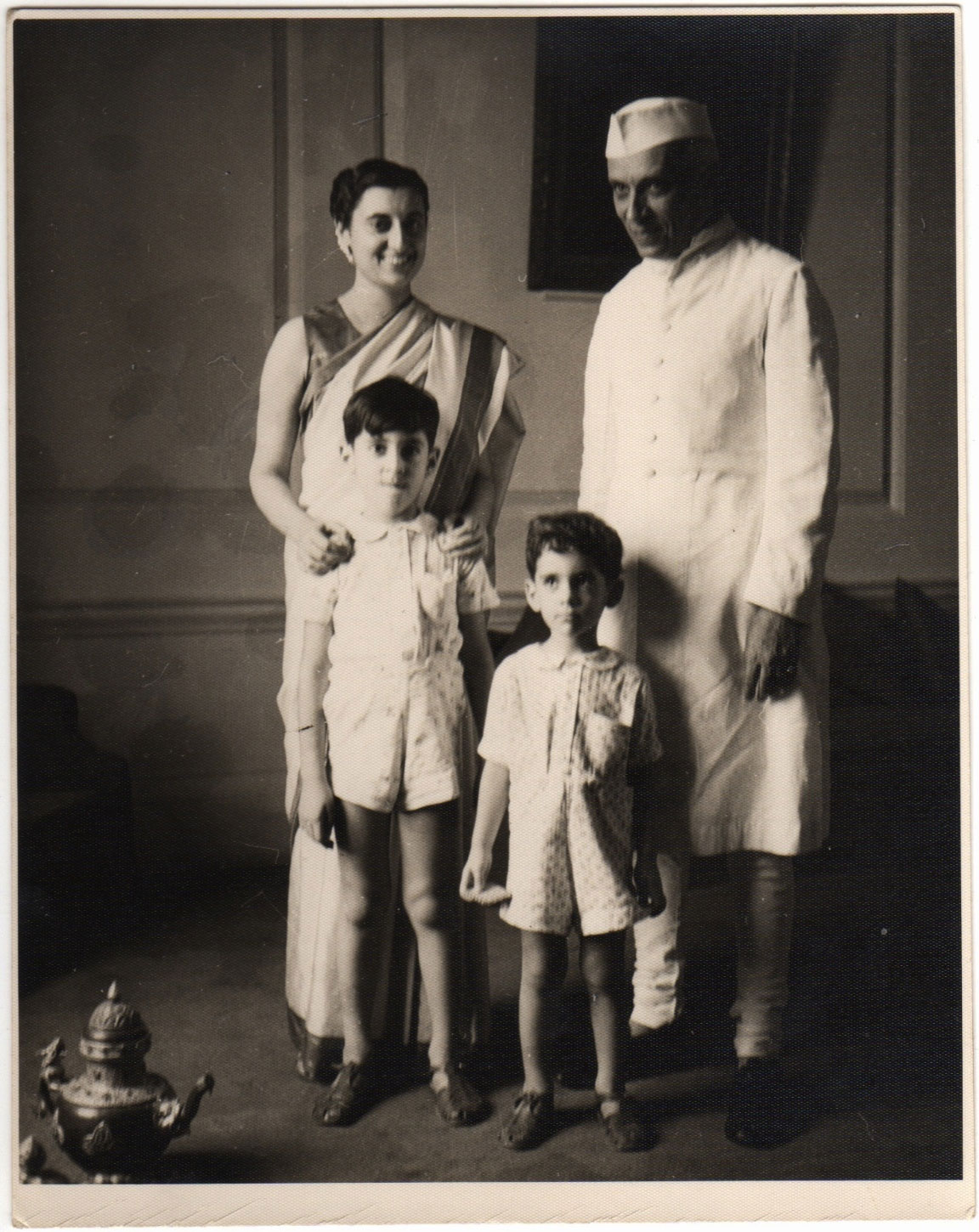
Gandhi with his mother Indira, maternal grandfather Jawaharlal Nehru and brother Sanjay in 1949

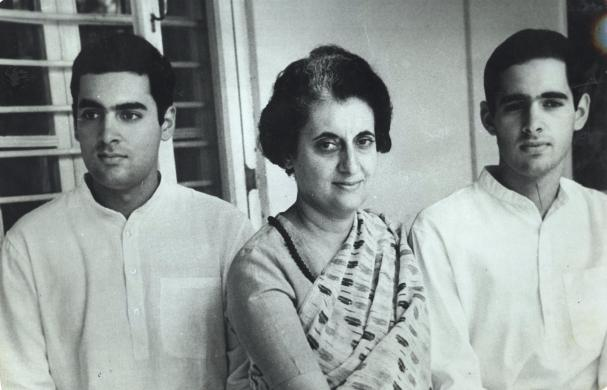
Gandhi with his mother Indira Gandhi and brother Sanjay Gandhi in 1971

Rajiv Gandhi was born in Bombay (Mumbai) on 20 August 1944 in British-ruled India to anti-colonial Indian activists Indira and Feroze Gandhi. In 1951, Rajiv and his younger brother Sanjay were admitted to Shiv Niketan school, where the teachers said Gandhi was shy and introverted, and "greatly enjoyed painting and drawing". He then studied at the St. Columba's School, Delhi. Thereafter, he was admitted to the preparatory Welham Boys' School and then moved to The Doon School, Dehradun in 1954, where Sanjay joined him two years later. At Doon, Gandhi's senior was Mani Shankar Aiyar, who later became a prominent member in his inner circle. Gandhi was also educated at the Ecole d'Humanité, an international boarding school in Switzerland. He left the Doon School in 1961 with a second-class certificate, having performed well in his final subjects apart from a pass mark in chemistry.

During Gandhi's final year at Doon, his mother and Albert D'Rozario, the scientific attaché at the Indian High Commission in London, arranged his application to Cambridge University. D'Rozario, who had been a college classmate of Gandhi's father Feroze, recommended that Gandhi should study engineering, and met with Mark Pryor, the Senior Tutor at Trinity College, Cambridge. Pryor arranged for Gandhi's conditional admission to Trinity, contingent on his passing the Mechanical Sciences Qualifying (MSQ) Examination with acceptable marks. After studying for his A-Levels at the sixth form college of Davies, Laing & Dick in London, Gandhi sat the MSQ Examination in March 1962 but was unsuccessful. He passed on his second attempt in June, and was admitted to Trinity on 4 September 1962, joining the college in October. While at Trinity, he joined the Cambridge University Boat Club.

During Gandhi's time at Cambridge, his mother and D'Rozario remained concerned about his well-being. D'Rozario, who along with his wife Sophy often hosted Gandhi at their Finchley home, took Gandhi to task for his inattention towards his studies. Despite his support, Gandhi failed end-of-year exams and left Trinity in 1965 without a degree, though he kept in touch with his former mentor in his retirement. In 1966 he began a course in mechanical engineering at Imperial College London, but also failed to complete it. Gandhi really was not studious enough, as he went on to admit later.

Gandhi returned to India in 1966, the year his mother became prime minister. He went to Delhi and became a member of the Flying Club, where he trained as a pilot. In 1970, he was employed as a pilot by Indian Airlines; unlike Sanjay, he did not exhibit any interest in joining politics. In 1968, after three years of courtship, he married Sonia Màino. Their first child, a son, Rahul was born in 1970. In 1972, the couple had a daughter, Priyanka, who married Robert Vadra. Gandhi was a friend of Amitabh Bachchan, and was familiar with Bachchan even before he launched his acting career. Rajiv, Sanjay and Bachchan spent time together when Bachchan was student in Delhi University and a resident of New Delhi. In the 1980s, Bachchan entered politics to support Gandhi.

== Entry into politics ==
On 23 June 1980, Rajiv's younger brother Sanjay Gandhi died unexpectedly in an aeroplane crash. At that time, Rajiv Gandhi was in London as part of his foreign tour. Hearing the news, he returned to Delhi and cremated Sanjay's body. As per Agarwal, in the week following Sanjay's death, Shankaracharya Swami Shri Swaroopanand, a saint from Badrinath, visited the family's house to offer his condolences. He advised Rajiv not to fly aeroplanes and instead "dedicate himself to the service of the nation". Seventy members of the Congress party signed a proposal and went to Indira, urging Rajiv to enter politics. Indira told them it was Rajiv's decision whether to enter politics. When he was questioned about it, he replied, "If my mother gets help from it, then I will enter politics". Rajiv entered politics on 16 February 1981, when he addressed a national farmers' rally in Delhi. During this time, he was still an employee of Air India.

=== Participation in active politics ===
On 4 May 1981, Indira Gandhi presided over a meeting of the All India Congress Committee. Vasantdada Patil proposed Rajiv as a candidate for Sanjay's old constituency, Amethi, which was accepted by all members at the meeting. A week later, the party officially announced his candidacy for the constituency. He then paid the party membership fees of the party and flew to Sultanpur to file his nomination papers and completed other formalities. He won the seat, defeating Lok Dal candidate Sharad Yadav by a margin of 237,000 votes. He took his oath on 17 August as Member of Parliament.

Rajiv Gandhi's first political tour was to England, where he attended the wedding ceremony of Prince Charles and Lady Diana Spencer on 29 July 1981. In December the same year, he was put in charge of the Indian Youth Congress. He first showed his organisational ability by "working round the clock" on the 1982 Asian Games. He was one of 33 members of the Indian parliament who were part of the Games' organising committee; sports historian Boria Majumdar writes that being "son of the prime minister he had a moral and unofficial authority" over the others. The report submitted by the Asian Games committee mentions Gandhi's "drive, zeal and initiative" for the "outstanding success" of the games.

=== 1984 anti-Sikh riots post Indira Gandhi's death ===
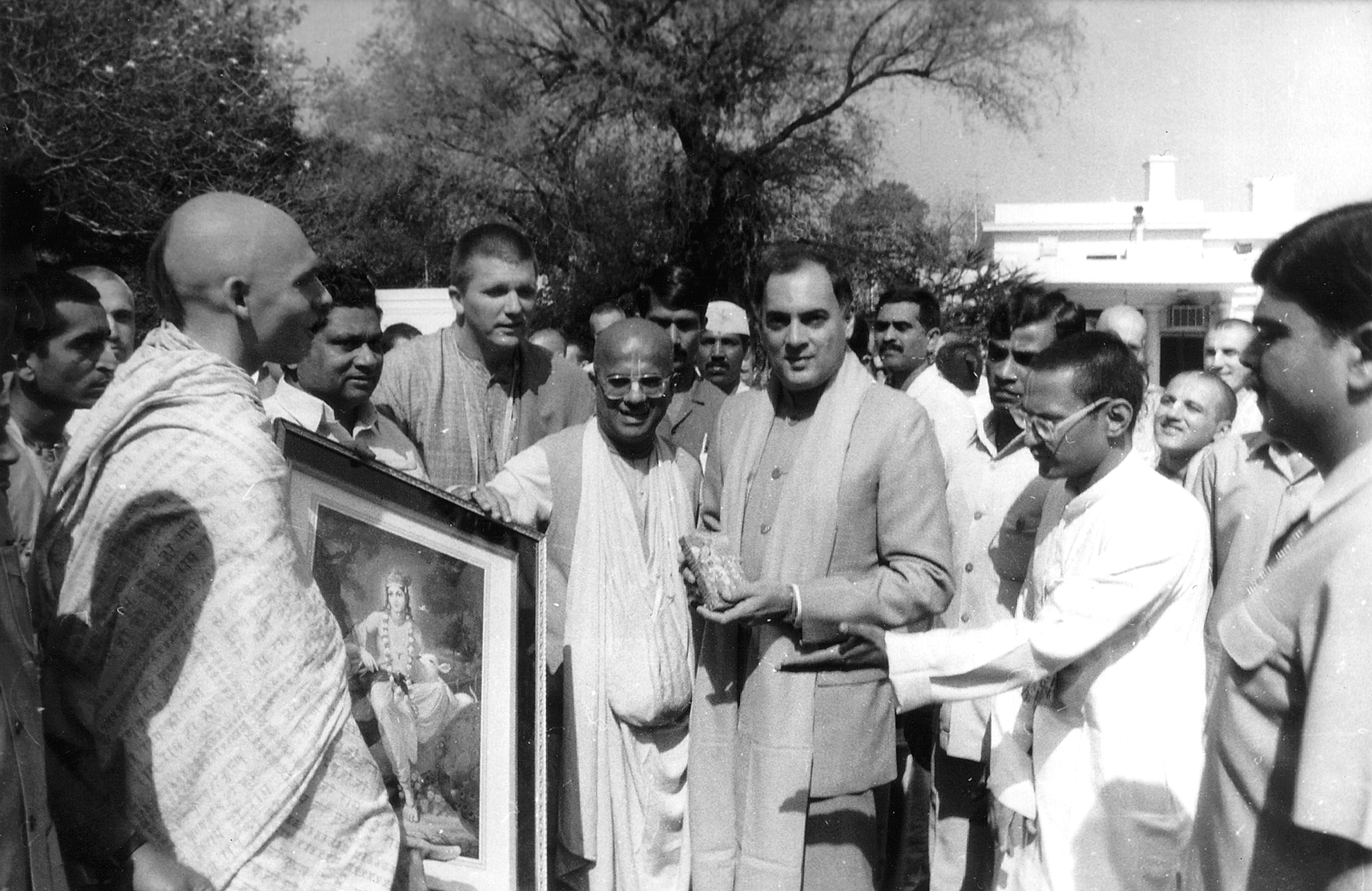
Meeting Russian Hare Krishna devotees in 1989.

On 31 October 1984, the prime minister, Rajiv Gandhi's mother, Indira Gandhi, was assassinated by her Sikh bodyguards, which led to violent riots against Sikhs. Sources estimate the number of Sikh deaths to be between 8,000 and 17,000. At a Boat Club rally 19 days after the assassination, Gandhi said, "Some riots took place in the country following the murder of Indiraji. We know the people were very angry and for a few days it seemed that India had been shaken. But, when a mighty tree falls, it is only natural that the earth around it does shake a little". According to Verinder Grover, the statement made by Gandhi was a "virtual justification" of the riots. Congress leader Mani Shankar Aiyar wrote, "Did it constitute an incitement to mass murder?" He also criticised Gandhi for his reluctance to bring the army from Meerut to handle the mob.

== Prime Minister of India (1984–1989) ==
Rajiv Gandhi was in West Bengal on 31 October 1984 when his mother, Prime Minister Indira Gandhi, was assassinated by two of her Sikh bodyguards, Satwant Singh and Beant Singh, to avenge the military attack on the Golden Temple during Operation Blue Star. Sardar Buta Singh and President Zail Singh pressed Rajiv to succeed his mother as prime minister within hours of her murder. Commenting on the anti-Sikh riots in Delhi, Rajiv Gandhi said, "When a giant tree falls, the earth below shakes"; a statement for which he was widely criticised. Many Congress politicians were accused of orchestrating the violence.

Indian politics got the youngest ever Prime minister in Rajiv Gandhi. This phenomenon attracted attention the world over. . . his winsome smile, charm and decency were his valuable personal assets. . . A senior opposition member, while talking to me, conceded that . . . he could not conceal his feeling that Rajiv Gandhi would be invincible for the opposition.

— Satyendra Narayan Sinha

Soon after assuming office, Gandhi asked President Singh to dissolve Parliament and hold fresh elections, as the Lok Sabha had completed its five-year term. Gandhi officially became the president of the Congress party, which won a landslide victory with the largest majority in history of the Indian Parliament, giving Gandhi absolute control of government. He benefited from his youth and a general perception of being free of a background in corrupt politics. Gandhi took his oath on 31 December 1984; at 40, he was the youngest prime minister of India. Historian Meena Agarwal writes that even after taking the Prime Ministerial oath, he was a relatively unknown figure, "novice in politics" as he assumed the post after being an MP for three years.

=== Cabinet ministers ===
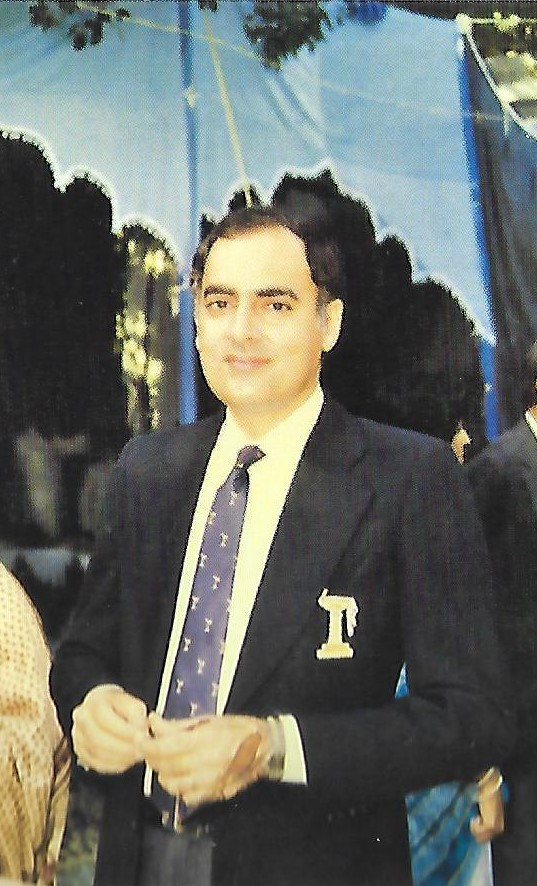
Gandhi's inner circle was labelled 'Doon Cabinet' or 'Dosco Mafia', given the induction of many of his Doon School acquaintances (Gandhi pictured in the Doon School blazer during a Founder's Day visit)

After his swearing-in as prime minister, Gandhi appointed his fourteen-member cabinet. He said he would monitor their performance and would "fire ministers who do not come to the mark". From the Third Indira Gandhi ministry, he removed two powerful figures; Finance Minister Pranab Mukherjee and Railway Minister A. B. A. Ghani Khan Choudhury. Mohsina Kidwai became the Minister of Railways; she was the only female figure in the cabinet. Former Home Minister PV Narasimha Rao was put in charge of defence. V. P. Singh, who was initially appointed as the Finance Minister, was given the Defence Ministry in 1987. During his tenure as prime minister, Gandhi frequently shuffled his cabinet ministers, drawing criticism from the magazine India Today, which called it a "wheel of confusion". The West Bengal chief minister Jyoti Basu said, "The Cabinet change reflects the instability of the Congress (I) Government at the Centre". He also administered and created the Ministry of Environment, Forest and Climate Change.

==== Dosco Mafia or Doon Cabinet ====
Gandhi, an alumnus of The Doon School, drew criticism from the media for appointing many old boys to his administration. His inner circle was labelled a "Doon Cabinet" or "Dosco Mafia", and Washington Post reported, "The catch phrase around Delhi these days is that the 'Doon School runs India,' but that is too simple an analysis for a complex, chaotic country with so many competing spheres of influence." Gandhi's reliance on Doon alumni for political advice later led Prime Minister Morarji Desai to remark, "If I had anything to do with this place, I'd close it down".

=== Anti-defection law ===
Gandhi's first action as prime minister was passing the anti-defection law in January 1985. According to this law, an elected Member of Parliament or legislative assembly could not join an opposition party until the next election. Historian Manish Telikicherla Chary calls it a measure of curbing corruption and bribery of ministers by switching parties so they could gain majority. Many such defections occurred during the 1980s as elected leaders of the Congress party joined opposition parties.

=== 1985 Congress Sandesh Yatra ===
Rajiv Gandhi had announced 'Sandesh Yatra' at the plenary session of AICC in Mumbai in 1985. The All India Congress Seva Dal ran it across the country. Pradesh Congress Committees (PCCs) and party leaders made four simultaneous trips from Mumbai, Kashmir, Kanyakumari and the Northeast. The yatra, which lasted for more than three months, concluded at Delhi's Ramlila Maidan.

=== Mass connect programmes though Bharat Yatra ===
In 1990, Rajiv Gandhi undertook Bharat Yatra through different modes – padyatra, the second class carriage of an ordinary passenger train. He chose Champaran as the starting point for his 'Bharat Yatra'. Rajiv Gandhi started the Sadbhavna Yatra from Charminar in Hyderabad on 19 October 1990.

=== Shah Bano case ===
In 1985, the Supreme Court of India ruled in favour of Muslim divorcee Shah Bano, declaring that her husband should give her alimony. Some Indian Muslims treated it as an encroachment upon Muslim Personal Law and protested against it. Gandhi agreed to their demands. In 1986, the Parliament of India passed The Muslim Women (Protection of Rights on Divorce) Act 1986, which nullified the Supreme Court's judgement in the Shah Bano case. The Act diluted the Supreme Court judgement and allowed maintenance payments to divorced women only during the period of Iddah, or until 90 days after the divorce, according to the provisions of Islamic law. This was in contrast to Section 125 of the Code. Indian magazine Business and Economics called it a minority appeasement by Gandhi. Lawyer and former Law Minister of India, Ram Jethmalani, called the Act "retrogressive obscurantism for short-term minority populism". Gandhi's colleague Arif Mohammad Khan, who was then a Member of Parliament, resigned in protest.

=== Economic policy ===
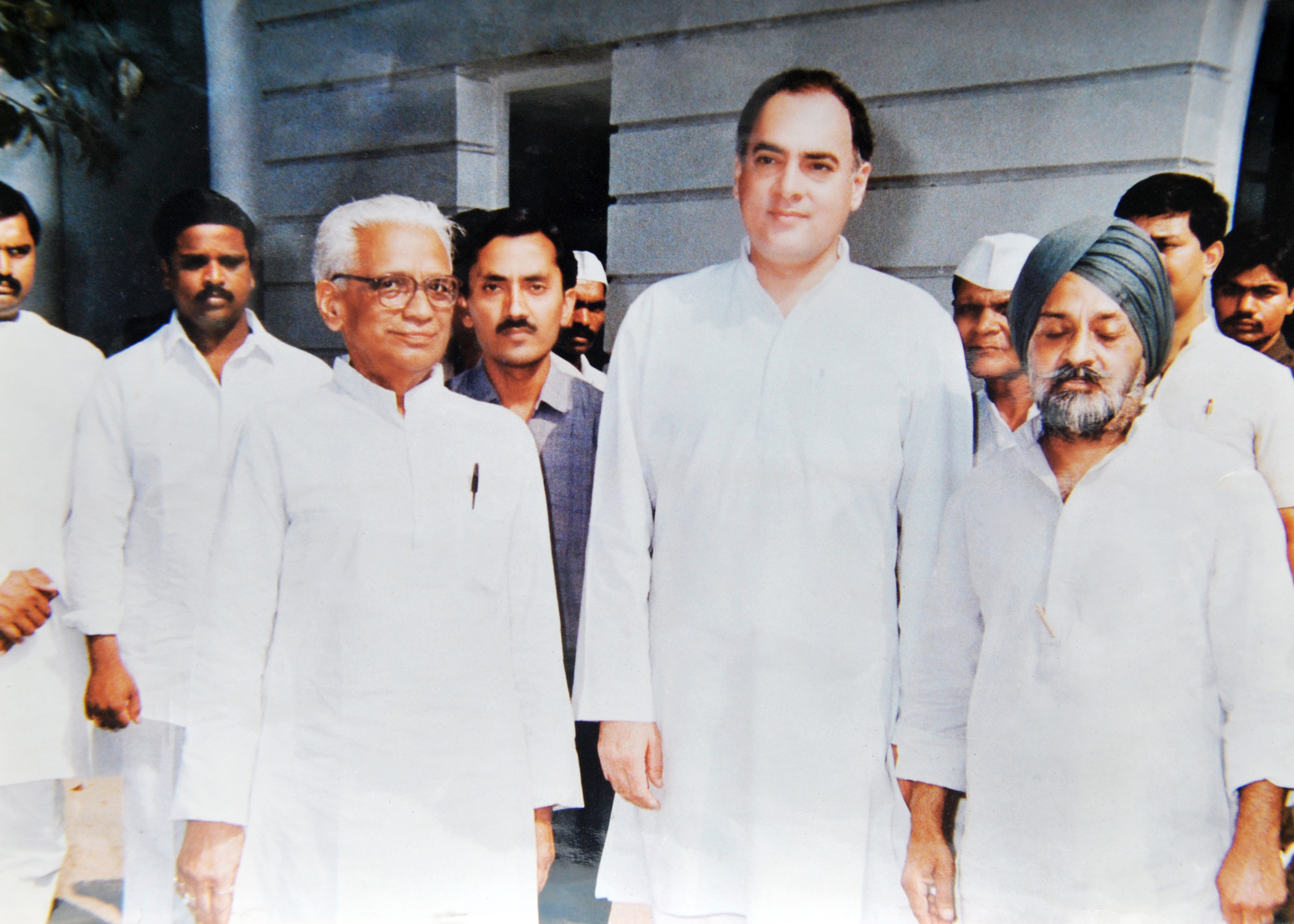
Prime Minister Rajiv Gandhi with Ram Kishore Shukla in 1988.

In his election manifesto for the 1984 general election, he did not mention any economic reforms, but after assuming office he tried to liberalise the country's economy. He sought to liberalise India's trade policies but faced stiff opposition to the proposed reforms. He did so by providing incentives to make private production profitable. Subsidies were given to corporate companies to increase industrial production, especially of durable goods. It was hoped this would increase economic growth and improve the quality of investment. Rural and tribal people protested because they saw them as "pro-rich" and "pro-city" reforms.

Gandhi increased government support for science, technology and associated industries, and reduced import quotas, taxes and tariffs on technology-based industries, especially computers, airlines, defence and telecommunications. In 1986, he announced a National Policy on Education to modernise and expand higher education programs across India. In 1986, he founded the Jawahar Navodaya Vidyalaya System, which is a Central government-based education institution that provides rural populations with free residential education from grades six to twelve. His efforts created MTNL in 1986, and his public call offices—better known as PCOs—helped develop the telephone network in rural areas. He introduced measures to significantly reduce the Licence Raj after 1990, allowing businesses and individuals to purchase capital, consumer goods and import without bureaucratic restrictions.

=== Foreign policy ===
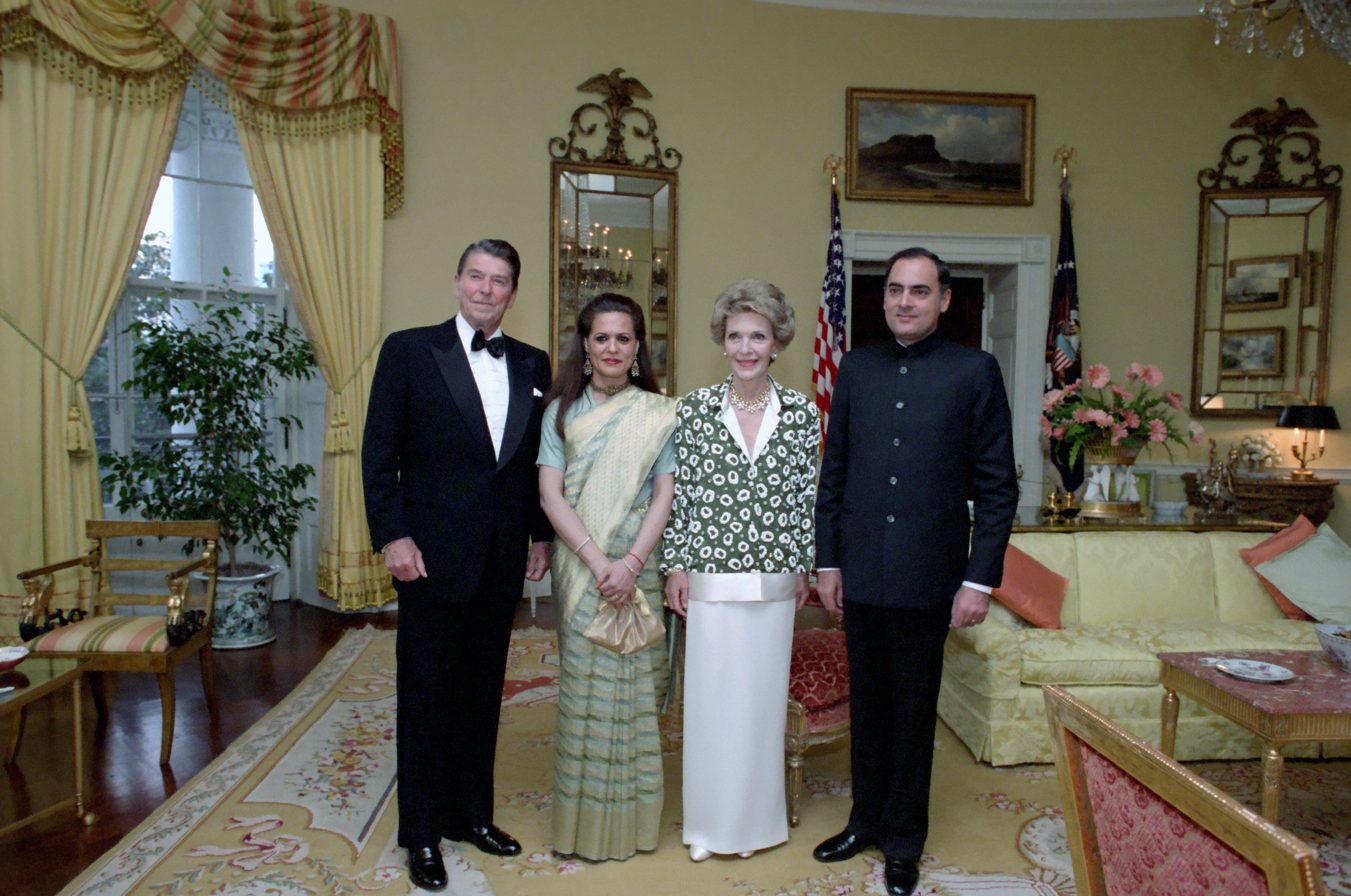
President Ronald Reagan, Sonia Gandhi, First Lady Nancy Reagan and Prime Minister Rajiv Gandhi, during a state dinner for Prime Minister Gandhi. June 1985.

According to Rejaul Karim Laskar, a scholar of Indian foreign policy and an ideologue of Congress party, Rajiv Gandhi's vision for a new world order was premised on India's place in its front rank. According to Laskar, the "whole gamut" of Rajiv Gandhi's foreign policy was "geared towards" making India "strong, independent, self-reliant and in the front rank of the nations of the world." According to Laskar, Rajiv Gandhi's diplomacy was "properly calibrated" so as to be "conciliatory and accommodating when required" and "assertive when the occasion demanded."

In 1986, by request of the president of Seychelles France-Albert René, Gandhi sent India's navy to Seychelles to oppose an attempted coup against René. The intervention of India averted the coup. This mission was codenamed as Operation Flowers are Blooming. In 1987, India re-occupied the Quaid Post in the disputed Siachen region of the Indo-Pakistani border after winning what was termed Operation Rajiv. In the 1988 Maldives coup d'état, the Maldives president Maumoon Abdul Gayoom asked for help from Gandhi. He dispatched 1500 soldiers and the coup was suppressed.

On Thursday, 9 June 1988, at the fifteenth special session of the United Nations General Assembly, held at Headquarters, New York, Gandhi made vocal his views on a world free of nuclear weapons, to be realised through an, 'Action Plan for Ushering in a Nuclear-Weapon Free and Non-Violent World Order.'

He said:

Alas, nuclear weapons are not the only weapons of mass destruction. New knowledge is being generated in the life sciences. Military applications of these developments could rapidly undermine the existing convention against the military use of biological weapons. The ambit of our concern must extend to all means of mass annihilation.

This was based on his prior historic speech before the Japanese National Diet on 29 November 1985, in which he said:

Let us remove the mental partitions which obstruct the ennobling vision of the human family linked together in peace and prosperity. The Buddha's message of compassion is the very condition of human survival in our age.

The foiled bid of India recently to enter the Nuclear Suppliers Group, echoed his policy of non-proliferation to be linked to universal disarmament, which the World Nuclear Association refuses to recognise; non-proliferation being seen by India as essentially a weapon of the arms control regime, of the big nuclear powers as United States, Russia, United Kingdom, France, and China.

In December 1988, Gandhi visited the People's Republic of China, becoming the first Indian prime minister to do so since Jawaharlal Nehru in 1954. During the visit, he met with Chinese paramount leader Deng Xiaoping, and the two sides agreed to establish a Joint Working Group to seek a solution to the long-standing border dispute and to expand cooperation in cultural, educational and scientific fields. In a joint communiqué, both governments agreed to maintain "peace and tranquility" along the border areas, while Gandhi acknowledged that Tibet was an internal affair of China.

==== Pakistan ====
In February 1987, the Pakistani president Zia-ul-Haq visited Delhi, where he met Gandhi to discuss "routine military exercises of the Indian army" on the borders of Rajasthan and Punjab. Gandhi reciprocated, in December 1988, by visiting Islamabad and meeting the new prime minister of Pakistan, Benazir Bhutto, to reaffirm the 1972 Shimla agreement.

==== Sri Lanka ====
The Sri Lankan Civil War broke out with the Liberation Tigers of Tamil Eelam (LTTE), which was demanding an independent Tamil state in Sri Lanka. Gandhi discussed the matter with the Sri Lankan Prime Minister Ranasinghe Premadasa at the SAARC meeting in 1986. In that year, the Sri Lankan army blockaded the Tamil majority district of Jaffna; Gandhi ordered relief supplies to be dropped into the area by parachute because the Sri Lankan navy did not allow the Indian Navy to enter.

Gandhi signed the Indo-Sri Lanka Accord in July 1987. The accord "envisaged a devolution of power to the Tamil-majority areas", dissolved the LTTE, and designated Tamil as an official language of Sri Lanka. Gandhi said:

The Government of India believe that, despite some problems and delays, many of which were foreseen but unavoidable in the resolution of an issue of this magnitude and complexity, this Agreement represents the only way of safeguarding legitimate Tamil interests and ensuring a durable peace in Sri Lanka. Some have chosen to criticise the Agreement. None has shown a better way of meeting the legitimate aspirations of the Tamils in Sri Lanka, restoring peace in that country and of meeting our own security concern in the region. We have accepted a role which is difficult, but which is in our national interests to discharge. We shall not shrink our obligations and commitments. This is a national endeavour.

Chanderasekar withdrew the IPKF in 1989.

==== Assault by Sri Lankan guard ====
On 30 July 1987, a day after Gandhi went to Sri Lanka and signed the Indo-Sri Lanka Accord, an honour guard named Vijitha Rohana hit him on his shoulder with his rifle; Gandhi's quick reflexes saved him from injury. The guard was then dragged off by his security personnel. The guard said his intention was to kill Gandhi because of "the damage he had caused" to Sri Lanka. Wijemuni was imprisoned for 2 1/2 years for the assault. Gandhi later said about the incident:

When I was inspecting the guard of honour and as I walked past one person, I saw through the corner of my eye some movement. I ducked down a little bit in a reflex action. By my ducking, he missed my head and the brunt of the blow came on my shoulder below the left ear.

=== Regional issues ===
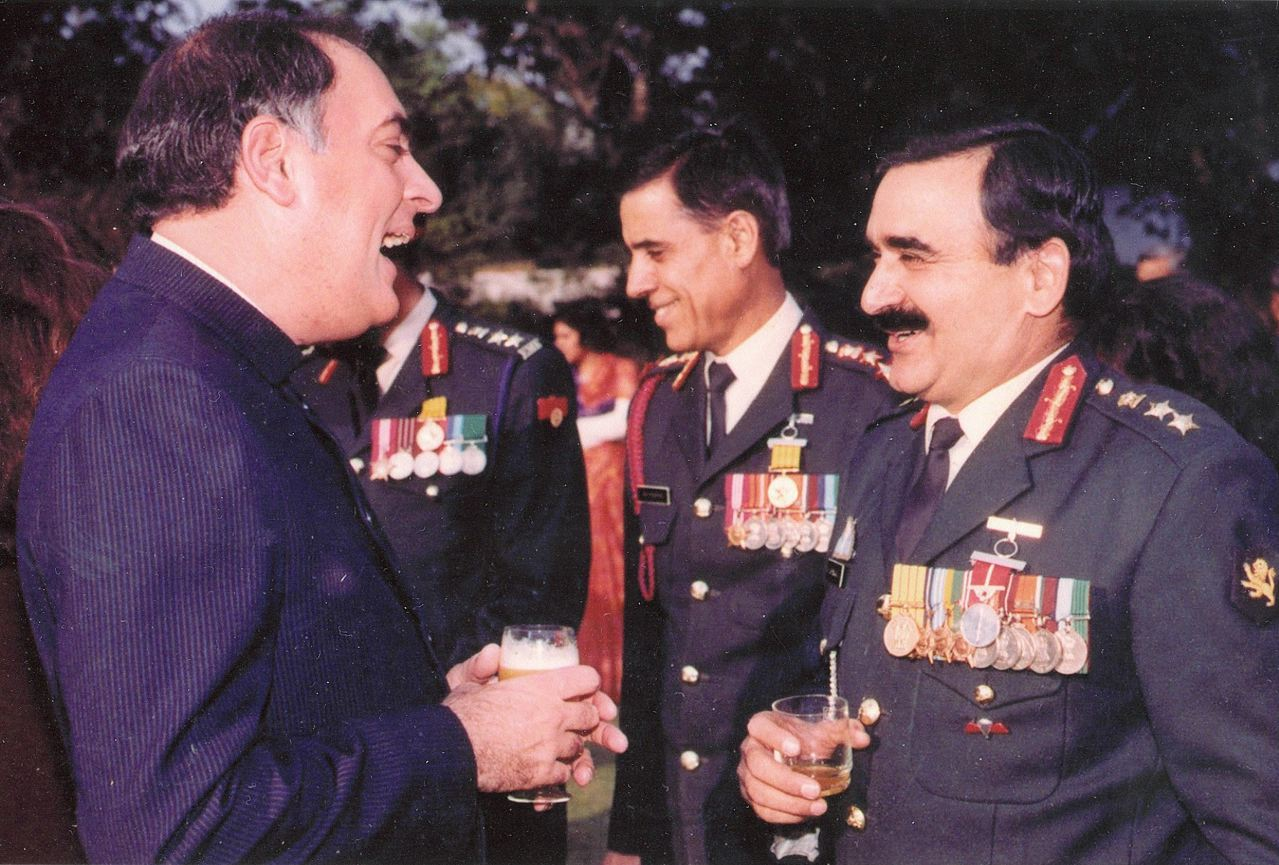
Rajiv Gandhi (left) congratulates Indian Army explorers for reaching the South Pole.

==== Punjab ====
Soon after assuming office, Gandhi released the leaders of the Akali Dal who had been imprisoned since 1984's Operation Blue Star during Indira Gandhi's prime ministership. He lifted the ban on All India Sikh Students Federation and filed an inquiry into the 1984 Anti-Sikh Riots. He also held a closed-door meeting with senior Akali Dal leaders to find a solution to the Punjab problem. Despite Akali opposition, in January 1985, Gandhi signed the Rajiv-Longowal Accord with Akali leader HS Longowal. Punjab's state assembly election was scheduled in September 1985, but Longowal died and was replaced by Surjit Singh Barnala, who formed the government. After two years, in 1987, Barnala resigned his office because of a breakdown of law and order, leading to the implementation of President's rule in the state.

In May 1988, Gandhi launched the Operation Black Thunder to clear the Golden Temple in Amritsar of arms and gunmen. Two groups called National Security Guard and Special Action Group were created; they surrounded the temple in a 10-day siege during which the extremists' weapons were confiscated. Congress leader Anand Sharma said, "Operation Black Thunder effectively demonstrated the will of Rajiv Gandhi's government to take firm action to bring peace to Punjab".

==== Northeast India ====
Gandhi's prime-ministership marked an increase of insurgency in northeast India. Mizo National Front demanded independence for Mizoram. In 1987, Gandhi addressed this problem; Mizoram and Arunachal Pradesh were given the status of states that were earlier union territories. Gandhi also ended the Assam Movement, which was launched by Assamese people to protest against the alleged illegal migration of Bangladeshi Muslims and immigration of other Bengalis to their state, which had reduced the Assamese to a minority there. He signed the Assam Accord on 15 August 1985. According to the accord, foreigners who came to the state between 1951 and 1961 were given full citizenship but those who arrived there between 1961 and 1971 did not get right to vote for the next ten years.

=== Technology ===
Gandhi employed former Rockwell International executive Sam Pitroda as his adviser on public information infrastructure and innovation. During Gandhi's time in office, public sector telecom companies MTNL and VSNL were developed. According to Pitroda, Gandhi's ability to resist pressure from multi-national companies to abandon his plan to spread telecommunication services has been an important factor in India's development. According to news website Oneindia, "About 20 years ago telephones were considered to be a thing for the use of the rich, but credit goes to Rajiv Gandhi for taking them to the rural masses". Pitroda also said their plan to expand India's telephone network succeeded because of Gandhi's political support. According to Pitroda, by 2007 they were "adding six million phones every month". Gandhi's government also allowed the import of fully assembled motherboards, which led to the price of computers being reduced. According to some commentators, the seed for the information technology (IT) revolution was also planted during Rajiv Gandhi's time.

=== Bofors scandal, HDW scandal ===
Rajiv Gandhi's finance minister, V. P. Singh, uncovered compromising details about government and political corruption, to the consternation of Congress leaders. Transferred to the Defence Ministry, Singh uncovered what became known as the Bofors scandal, which involved millions of US dollars and concerned alleged payoffs by the Swedish arms company Bofors through Italian businessman and Gandhi family associate Ottavio Quattrocchi, in return for Indian contracts. Upon discovering the scandal, Singh was dismissed from office and later resigned his Congress membership. Gandhi was later personally implicated in the scandal when the investigation was continued by Narasimhan Ram and Chitra Subramaniam of The Hindu newspaper, damaging his image as an honest politician. In 2004, he was posthumously cleared of this allegation.

In an interview in July 2005, V. P. Singh explained that his fall out with Rajiv Gandhi was not due to the Bofors deal, but rather due to the HDW deal. Courtesy a contract signed with the German company HDW in 1981, the Indian government had agreed to purchase two ready submarines built in Germany by HDW and two submarines in CKD form to be assembled in Mazagaon docks. V. P. Singh had received a telegram from the Indian ambassador in Germany, stating that an Indian agent had received commissions in the HDW submarine deal. He told Rajiv Gandhi about this and instituted an enquiry. This led to differences and V. P. Singh resigned from the cabinet.

In his book, Unknown Facets of Rajiv Gandhi, Jyoti Basu and Indrajit Gupta, released in November 2013, former CBI director Dr. A P Mukherjee wrote that Gandhi wanted commission paid by defence suppliers to be used exclusively for meeting running expenses of the Congress party. Mukherjee said Gandhi explained his position in a meeting between the two at the prime minister's residence on 19 June 1989. In May 2015, Indian president Pranab Mukherjee said the scandal was a "media trial" as "no Indian court has as yet established it as a scandal".

== Post-Premiership ==
Opposition parties Lok Dal, Indian National Congress (Socialist) and Jan Morcha united under Singh to form the Janata Dal. Singh led the National Front coalition to victory in 1989 elections and he was sworn in as prime minister. Though the coalition won 143 seats compared to Congress's 197, it gained majority in the lower house of the parliament through outside support from the Bharatiya Janta Party under the leadership of Atal Bihari Vajpayee and Lal Krishna Advani and the left parties such as the Communist Party of India (Marxist) and the Communist Party of India. Eminent lawyer and politician, former Law Minister of India Ram Jethmalani said that as prime minister, Gandhi was "lacklustre and mediocre".

== Assassination ==
Rajiv Gandhi's last public meeting was on 21 May 1991, at Sriperumbudur, a village approximately 40 km (25 miles) from Madras (present-day Chennai), where he was assassinated while campaigning for the Sriperumbudur Lok Sabha Congress candidate. At 10:10 pm, a woman later identified as 22-year old Kalaivani Rajaratnam – a member of the Liberation Tigers of Tamil Eelam – approached Gandhi in public and greeted him. She then bent down to touch his feet and detonated a belt laden with 700 g (1.5 lb) of RDX explosives tucked under her dress.

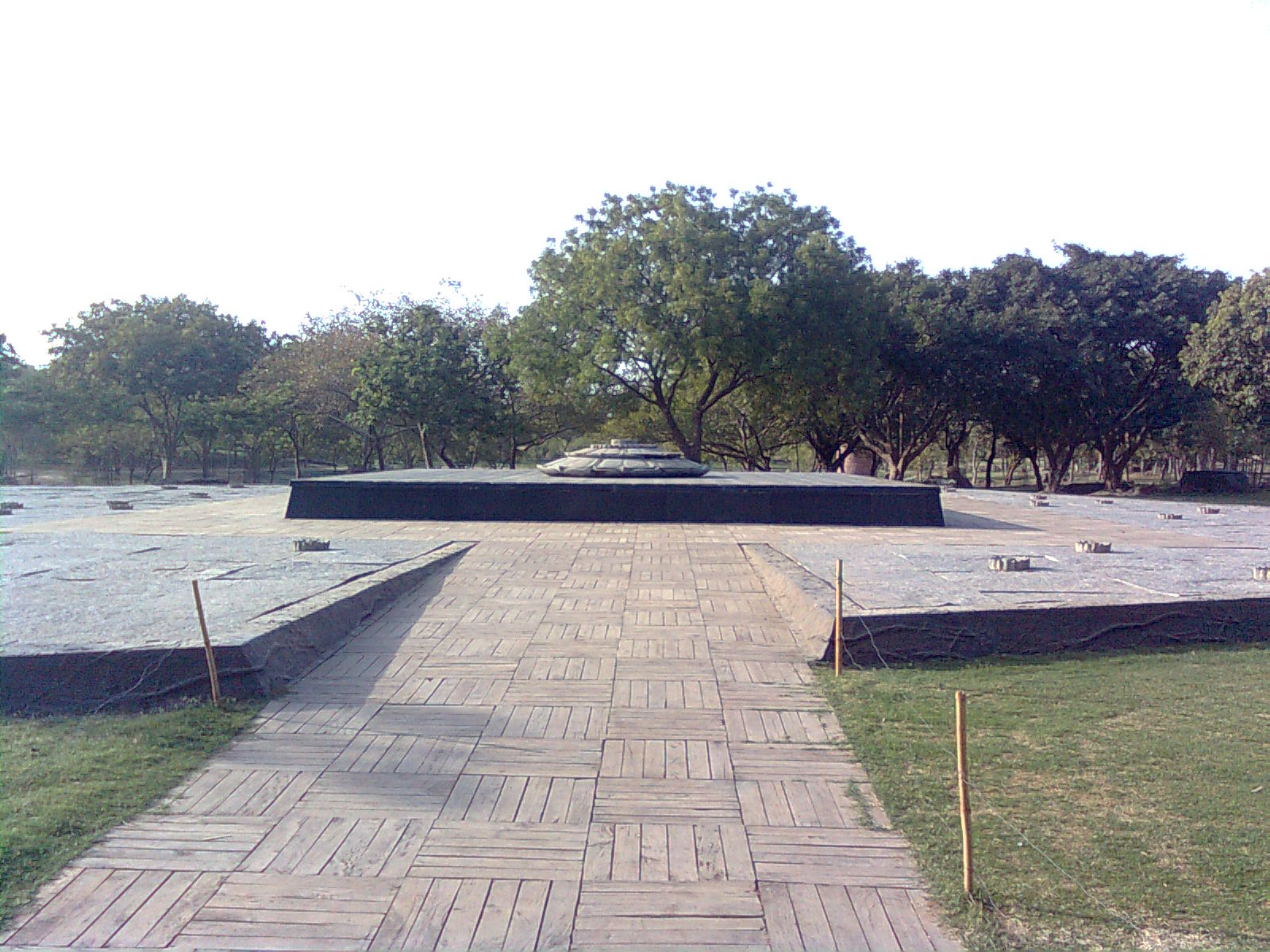
Veer Bhumi at Delhi, where Rajiv Gandhi was cremated

The explosion killed Gandhi, Rajaratnam, and at least 14 other people. The assassination was captured by a 21-year-old local photographer, whose camera and film were found at the site. The cameraman, named Haribabu, died in the blast but the camera remained intact. Gandhi's mutilated body was airlifted to the All India Institute of Medical Sciences in New Delhi for post-mortem, reconstruction, and embalming.

A state funeral was held for Gandhi on 24 May 1991; it was telecast live and was attended by dignitaries from over 60 countries. He was cremated at Vir Bhumi, on the banks of the river Yamuna near the shrines of his mother Indira Gandhi, brother Sanjay Gandhi, and grandfather Jawaharlal Nehru.

=== Aftermath ===
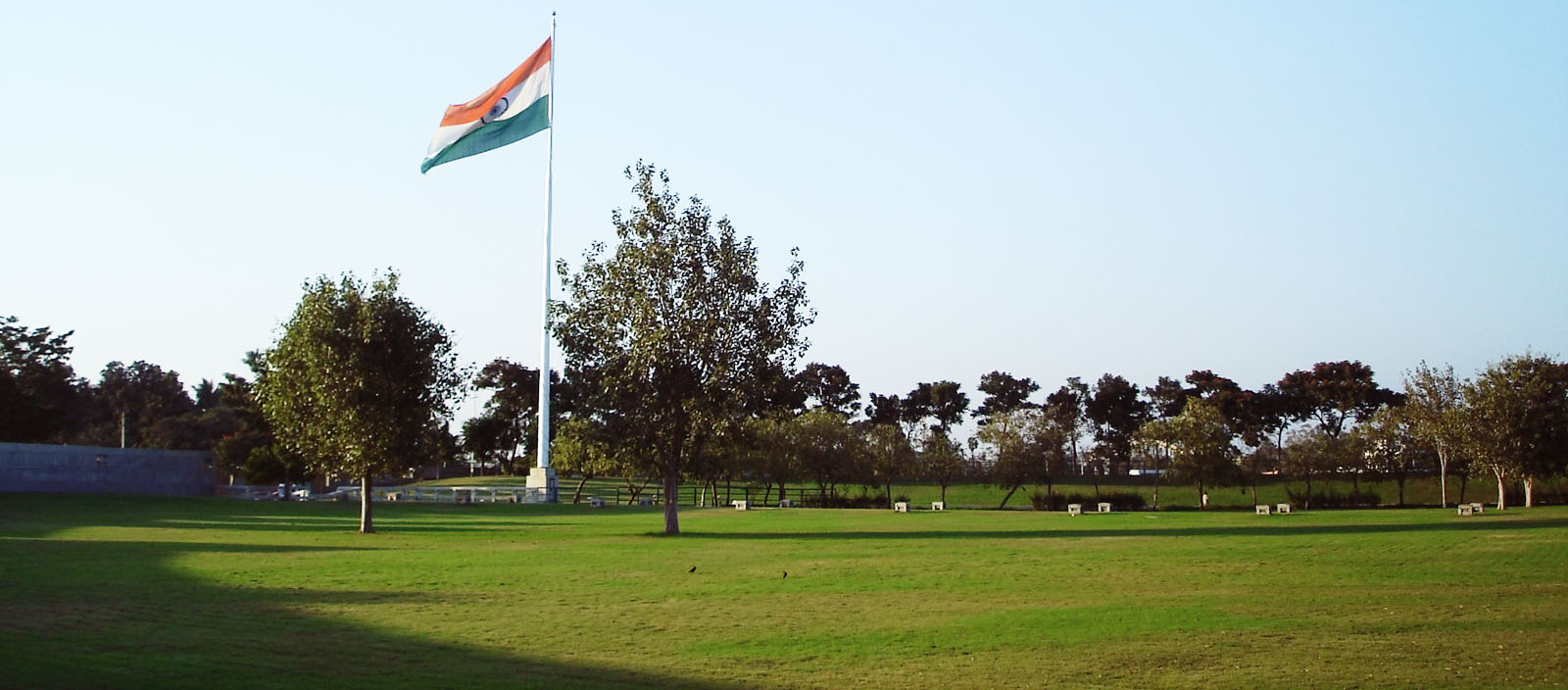
The Rajiv Gandhi Memorial, at Sriperumbudur

The Supreme Court judgement, by Justice K. T. Thomas, confirmed that Gandhi was killed because of personal animosity by the LTTE chief Prabhakaran arising from his sending the Indian Peace Keeping Force (IPKF) to Sri Lanka and the IPKF atrocities against Sri Lankan Tamils. The Gandhi administration had already antagonised other Tamil militant organisations like PLOTE for reversing the 1988 military coup in Maldives. The judgement further cites the death of Thileepan in a hunger strike and the suicide by 12 LTTE cadres in a vessel in Oct 1987.

In the Jain Commission report, various people and agencies are named as suspects in the murder of Rajiv Gandhi. Among them, the cleric Chandraswami was suspected of involvement, including financing the assassination. Nalini Sriharan, the only surviving member of the five-member squad behind the assassination of Rajiv Gandhi, is serving life imprisonment. Arrested on 14 June 1991, she and 25 others were sentenced to death by a special court on 28 January 1998. The court confirmed the death sentences of four of the convicts, including Nalini, on 11 May 1999. Nalini was a close friend of an LTTE operative known as Sriharan alias Murugan, another convict in the case who has been sentenced to death. Nalini later gave birth to a girl, Harithra, in prison. Nalini's death sentence was commuted to life imprisonment in April 2000. Rajiv's widow, Sonia Gandhi, intervened and asked for clemency for Nalini on the grounds of the latter being a mother. Later, it was reported that Gandhi's daughter, Priyanka, had met Nalini at Vellore Central Prison in March 2008. Nalini regrets the killing of Gandhi and said the real conspirators have not been caught yet.

In August 2011, the president of India rejected the clemency pleas of Murugan and two others on death row—Suthendraraja, alias Santhan, and Perarivalan, alias Arivu. The execution of the three convicts was scheduled for 9 September 2011. However, the Madras High Court intervened and stayed their executions for eight weeks based on their petitions. In 2010, Nalini had petitioned the Madras High Court seeking release because she had served more than 20 years in prison. She argued that even life convicts were released after 14 years. The state government rejected her request. Murugan, Santhan and Perarivalan have said they are political prisoners rather than ordinary criminals. On 18 February 2014, the Supreme Court of India commuted the death sentences of Murugan, Santhan and Perarivalan to life imprisonment, holding that the 11-year-long delay in deciding their mercy petition had a dehumanising effect on them. On 19 February 2014 Tamil Nadu government decided to release all seven convicts in Rajiv Gandhi's assassination case, including A. G. Perarivalan and Nalini. The Government of India challenged this decision before the Supreme Court, which referred the case to a Constitution Bench.

The report of the Jain Commission created controversy when it accused the Tamil Nadu chief minister Karunanidhi of a role in the assassination, leading to Congress withdrawing its support for the I. K. Gujral government and fresh elections in 1998. LTTE spokesman Anton Balasingham told the Indian television channel NDTV the killing was a "great tragedy, a monumental historical tragedy which we deeply regret". A memorial called Vir Bhumi was constructed at the place of Gandhi's cremation in Delhi. In 1992, the Rajiv Gandhi National Sadbhavana Award was instituted by the Indian National Congress Party.

Since his death, 21 May has been declared Anti-Terrorism Day in India.

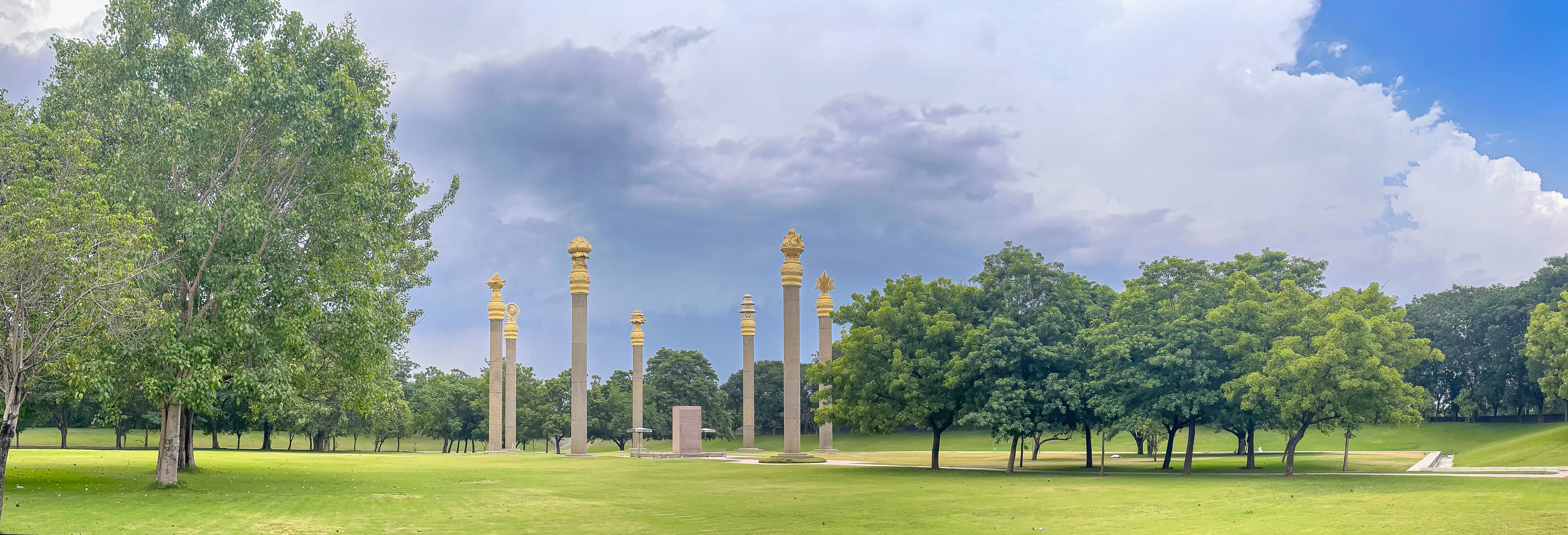
A Panoramic view of Rajiv Gandhi Memorial

== Awards and honours ==
=== National honours ===
- India:
  - Bharat Ratna (1991, posthumous)

=== Foreign honours ===
- Nicaragua:
  - Order of Augusto César Sandino, Battle of San Jacinto (1986)

== In popular culture ==
A number of films have been made in India focusing on Rajiv Gandhi's life especially on his assassination. India's Rajiv is a 1991 Indian documentary television series by Simi Garewal, released closely after Gandhi's assassination it covers his life up to that event. Indian films specifically focusing on the assassination plot include The Terrorist (1997) by Santosh Sivan, Cyanide (2006) by A. M. R. Ramesh, Kuttrapathirikai (2007) by R. K. Selvamani with Anupam Kher in the role of Gandhi, Mission 90 Days (2007) by Major Ravi, and Madras Cafe (2013) by Shoojit Sircar starring Sanjay Gurbaxani as the former prime minister.

Pradhanmantri (lit. 'Prime Minister'), a 2013 Indian documentary television series which aired on ABP News and covers the various policies and political tenures of Indian PMs, includes the tenureship of Rajiv Gandhi in the episodes "Rajiv Gandhi becomes PM and Shah Bano case", "Ayodhya dispute", "Rajiv Gandhi and Bofors scandal", and "Rise of LTTE and Assassination of Rajiv Gandhi" with Mohit Chauhan portraying the role of Gandhi.

== Cited sources ==
- Agarwal, Meena (2004). Rajiv Gandhi. Diamond Pocket Books. ISBN 9788128809002.
- Aiyar, Mani Shankar (2006). Confessions of a Secular Fundamentalist. Penguin Books. ISBN 9780143062059.
- Sharma, Anand (2011). Journey of a Nation. Academic Foundation. ISBN 9788171888405.

Lok Sabha
Preceded by Sanjay Gandhi	Member of Parliament for Amethi; 1981–1991	Succeeded by Satish Sharma
Political offices
Preceded by Indira Gandhi	Prime Minister of India; 31 October 1984 – 2 December 1989	Succeeded by V. P. Singh
Preceded by Indira Gandhi	Chair of the Planning Commission; 31 October 1984 – 2 December 1989	Succeeded by V. P. Singh
Preceded by Indira Gandhi	Union Minister of External Affairs; 31 October 1984 – 24 September 1985	Succeeded by Bali Ram Bhagat
Preceded by Khurshed Alam Khan	Union Minister of Civil Aviation; 31 October 1984 – 24 September 1985	Succeeded by Bansi Lal
Preceded by P. V. Narasimha Rao	Union Minister of Defence; 25 September 1985 – 24 January 1987	Succeeded by V. P. Singh
Preceded by V. P. Singh	Union Minister of Finance; 24 January 1987 – 25 July 1987	Succeeded by N. D. Tiwari
Preceded by N. D. Tiwari	Union Minister of External Affairs; 25 July 1987 – 25 June 1988	Succeeded by P. V. Narasimha Rao
Diplomatic posts
Preceded by Ataur Rahman Khan	Chairperson of SAARC; 16 November 1986 – 1 November 1987	Succeeded by Marich Man Singh Shrestha
