= D. R. Karthikeyan =

Indian civil servant

D.R Kaarthikeyan

Director Central Bureau of Investigation
- In office 31 January 1998 – 31 March 1998
- Preceded by: R. C. Sharma
- Succeeded by: T. N. Mishra (acting)

Personal details
- Born: 2 October 1939 (age 87) Coimbatore, Tamil Nadu, India
- Education: Annamalai University; Dr. Ambedkar Government Law College, Chennai
- Occupation: Civil servant
- Awards: Padma Shri; 2010

Devarayapuram Ramasamy Kaarthikeyan is a former Indian Police Service officer (1964 Batch and Karnataka cadre) from Tamil Nadu, and a former director of the Central Bureau of Investigation and Director General, National Human Rights Commission.

== Personal life ==
D.R. Kaarthikeyan was born to an agricultural family in a small village called Devarayapuram in Coimbatore district, Tamil Nadu, India. He obtained a B.Sc. degree in Chemistry and Agriculture from the Annamalai University. He worked in the field of agriculture in the ancestral farm of his native village for a year. He also obtained a Bachelor of Law degree from the Madras Law College and was enrolled as an Advocate in the Bar Council of Madras.

After passing the Combined Competitive Examinations for Senior Civil Services, he joined the Indian Police Service (IPS) in 1964. Kaarthikeyan went through extensive training in that field which included being trained at the National Police Academy in Mount Abu.

== Offices held ==
Kaarthikeyan has held various offices:

- Deputy Commissioner of Police, Law and Order, Bangalore
- Deputy Inspector General of Police, Karnataka State Intelligence Department
- Head of Karnataka State Police Academy
- Inspector General of Police, Central Reserve Police Force (CRPF), Southern Sector, Hyderabad
- First Secretary in the Embassy of India, Moscow, Russia (1974-1977)
- Embassy of India, Sydney, Australia (1985-1989), promoting Indian exports to Australia, New Zealand and Fiji
- Special Director General, Central Reserve Police Force
- Director, Central Bureau of Investigation (1998)
- Director General, National Human Rights Commission
- President (Age-Care India, New Delhi)
- President, Foundation for Peace, Harmony and Good Governance

== Recognition ==
Kaarthikeyan was awarded the Padma Shri in 2010 for his contribution to the field of Indian Civil Service.

== Rajiv Gandhi assassination case ==
Kaarthikeyan headed the Special Investigation Team (SIT) that probed the Rajiv Gandhi assassination case. At the invitation of INTERPOL, he made an audiovisual presentation of the investigation before an assembly of top police officers, who commended Kaarthikeyan for the model investigation.
