= Samriddhi =

Indian student business conference

- Genre: Student-run business conference/fest
- Locations: Sanquelim, Goa, India
- Founded: 2006; 20 years ago
- Guests: Alyque Padamsee, Mithileshwar Jha, Kumar Ankit, Stephen Remedios,
- Major events: Business Conference, Quizzes, Case Studies Etc.
- Sponsor: Goa Institute of Management
- Website: www.gim-samriddhi.com

Samriddhi is an Indian annual student-run business conference that takes place at the Goa Institute of Management, India. Samriddhi is an indian word meaning 'prosperity', 'wealth', or 'abundance'.

Samriddhi is one of the largest Business School Conferences. It is a three-day event that features prominent speakers and participants from colleges all over India.

The main event during Samriddhi is the business conference, where speakers from diverse business backgrounds and interests come together and speak about topics related to the theme of that year's conference. Other events also that take place during the course of the three-day conference include quizzes, case studies, and a photography competition.

== 2012 ==
The theme for the year 2012 was "The Business of Innovation". Speakers from varying backgrounds came together to speak about their fields of work and explain to students how they brought about innovation. Speakers this year included, amongst others, the Governor of Goa H.E. Bharat Vir Wanchoo, Alyque Padamsee (Actor and Ad Guru), Kumar Ankit (Co-founder & Executive Director at Green Leaf Energy Private Limited), Stephen Remedios (Former Head Customer Marketing, HUL), and Mithileshwar Jha (Professor Marketing at the Indian Institute of Management Bangalore).

The topics ranged from Film making to the Advertising to Business Logistics. In addition to the Business Conference, on the second and third days of the conference, various educational and entertaining events were held for students from Business schools all across India.

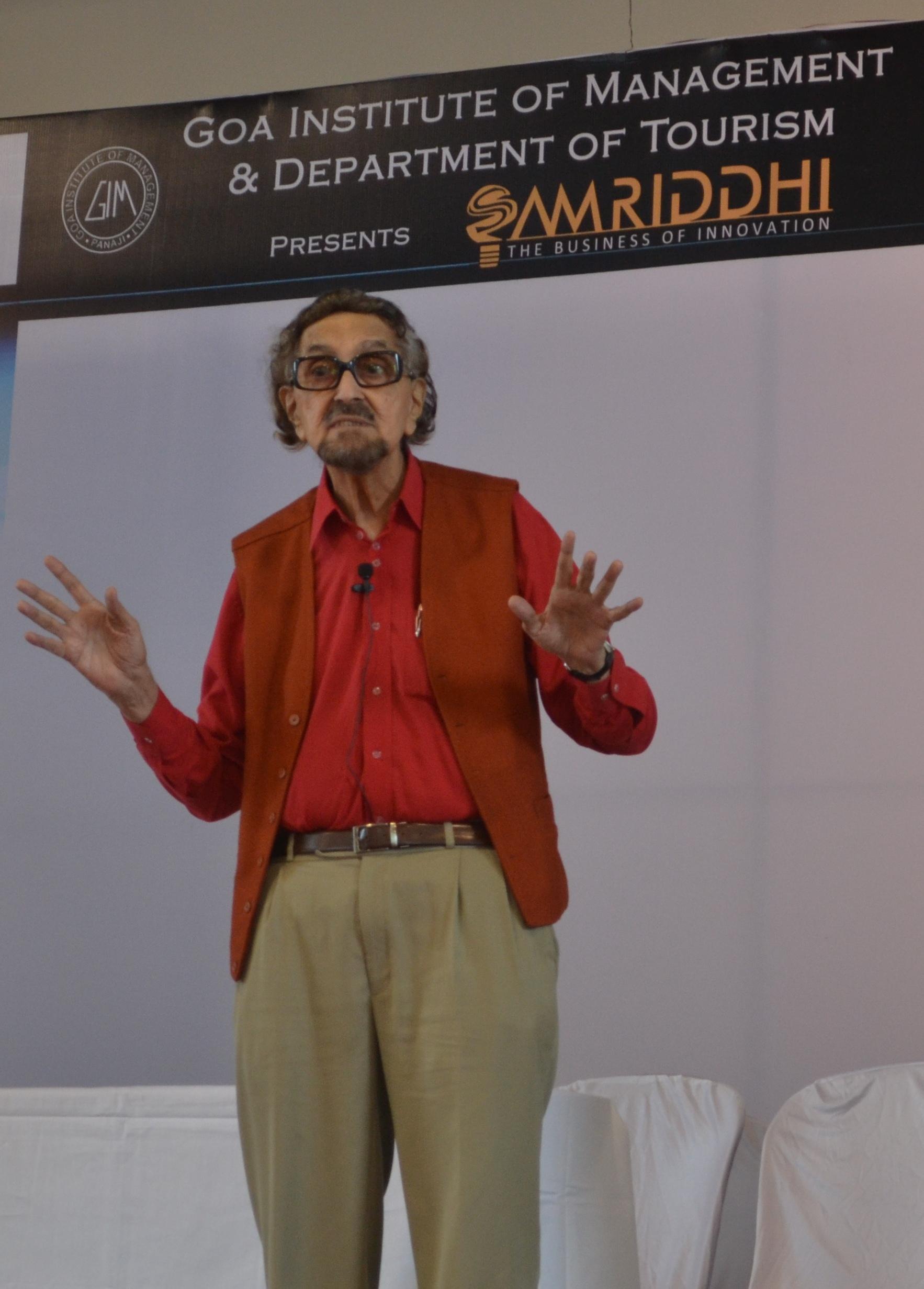
Alyque Padamsee addressing students at Samriddhi 2012.

=== Speakers for 2012 ===
- Bharat Vir Wanchoo, Governor of Goa
- Alyque Padamsee
- S L Ganapathi
- Stephen Remedios
- Commodore Srikant Kesnur
- Captain Praveen Nair
- Devdutt Modak
- Kumar Ankit
