= Abbey DLD Colleges Group =

- United Kingdom

Information
- Website: www.abbeycolleges.co.uk

The Abbey DLD Colleges Group is a group of independent sixth form colleges in the United Kingdom, in London, Manchester, and Cambridge. These colleges are operated by the Abbey DLD Colleges Group Ltd and have campuses in London, Cambridge and Manchester.

== Colleges ==
The oldest college within the group is Davies Laing and Dick College (DLD), which was established in 1931. After 10 years in Marylebone, the college merged with its younger sister Abbey College and moved in 2015 to a new purpose-built campus in Lambeth, DLD College London. As of 2024, the college had over 400 students, and its headteacher is James Kidd.

Abbey College Cambridge opened in 1994 and moved to purpose-built premises in 2016. In the same academic year, the Cambridge centre achieved an A*-A grade rate of 61%. As of 2024, the college had 450 students, and its headteacher was Elena Hesse.

Providing A Level and GCSE education since 1990, Abbey College Manchester also includes International Foundation Programme pathways in Business, Science, Engineering, Humanities and Creative Arts. There are three major faculties within the college – Science and Mathematics, Arts and Humanities, and Languages and International Studies. The Manchester campus is based in the city centre of Manchester. As of 2024, the college had 211 students, and its headteacher was Chris Randell.

== Academic Results ==
2022's A-level results across the three colleges were as follows:

- Abbey College Cambridge: Percentage of A-level exam entries A*-A = 60%.
- DLD College London: Percentage of A-level exam entries A*-A = 40%.
- Abbey College Manchester: Percentage of A-level exam entries A*-A = 38%.

== Student disappearances ==
In 2017, three Vietnamese students went missing from Abbey College Manchester. Three Vietnamese students also disappeared from DLD College London. In total, 21 or 27 Vietnamese students, all girls, had disappeared from a number of independent schools and colleges. According to the Manchester Mill, "teachers at the college sometimes worried about the students they met at the start of the school year". An ex-staff member from Abbey College Manchester told a journalist that "Some of them are 14-15, can barely speak the language, live with strangers and often the courses they are enrolled on are completely unsuitable". According to the newspaper, the former staff member believed that "The college was well run and the teachers did the best for the students who were thrust into their care from every corner of the globe, but he 'had concerns about whether some students should be with us'". It is speculated that the missing children are victims of human trafficking.

== Locations ==
- DLD College London, Westminster Bridge Road, London
- Abbey College Cambridge (52.1952°N 0.1326°E)
- Abbey College Manchester (53.4814°N 2.2440°W)
