= Chandraswami =

Indian spiritual leader

Tantrik Jagadacharya Chandraswami Ji Maharaj (born as Nemichand Jain on Gopashtmi, 29 October 1949– 23 May 2017) was an Indian Tantrik.

== Early life ==
Nemichand's father Dharamchand Gandhi Jain came from Bagor in Kotputli-Behror district district of Rajasthan. The family moved to Hyderabad in 1960s when he was a child. Nemichand was attracted to the study of Tantra from an early age. He left home young to study under Upadhyaya Amar Muni and the renowned tantrik scholar Gopinath Kaviraj. Nemichand briefly participated in student and social agitations such as the 'Save Hindi Movement' of 1963 at age 13 in Hyderabad. He actively participated in the pro-Hindi agitation and was briefly jailed—an event that brought him early public attention and a visit from veteran Congress leader Seth Govind Das and he took part in the nationwide movement in 1966. He later notes this as the turning point that led him to renounce household life, walk from Hyderabad to jungles of Bihar and Kathmandu, and dedicate himself to sadhana (spiritual discipline) and tantrik studies. He claimed that after meditation and worshiping Shakti, he obtained extraordinary powers called siddhis.

He became a "sadhaka" (worshipper) of the Goddess Kali. He was also interested in interfaith dialogue, and sat on the Board of World Religious Leaders for the Elijah Interfaith Institute.

== Rise to fame ==
He first gained fame as an astrologer but his rise to national prominence came as a result of his association with three Prime Ministers of India P. V. Narasimha Rao, Chandra Shekhar and V. P. Singh. Chandraswami was said to have been their spiritual adviser. Soon after P. V. Narasimha Rao became Prime Minister in 1991, Chandraswami built an ashram known as Vishwa Dharmayatan Sansathan in Delhi's Qutub Institutional Area. The land for the ashram had been allotted by Indira Gandhi. During the early 1990s—at the height of the Ram Janmabhoomi–Babri Masjid dispute—Chandraswami played an active behind-the-scenes and public role in Ayodhya as an intermediary aligned with Prime Minister P. V. Narasimha Rao.Following the demolition of the Babri Masjid on 6 December 1992, Chandraswami stepped directly into the public spotlight in Ayodhya in June 1993 by organizing a massive, multi-day Som Yagya (a grand Vedic fire ritual) in the town.

Chandraswami is said to have dispensed spiritual advice to these world famous leaders Hassanal Bolkiah Sultan of Brunei, Sheikh Isa bin Salman Al Khalifa of Bahrain, Hosni Mubarak, Yasser Arafat, Hans-Adam II, Prince of Liechtenstein, Richard Nixon, Margaret Thatcher, Mobutu Sese Seko, Hussein of Jordan, J. R. Jayewardene, actress Elizabeth Taylor, crime lord Dawood Ibrahim, arms dealer Adnan Khashoggi, Nabila Khashoggi businessmen Tiny Rowland, Mohamed Al-Fayed, S. P. Hinduja, Gopichand Hinduja, Dhirubhai Ambani, Vijay Mallya and almost every Indian politicians were seeking his blessings at that time. His loyal supporters include the late Kailash Nath Aggarwal known as Mamaji, former BJP MLA Vikram singh, nephews Mammu and Sunil. Chandraswami's finances have fluctuated with his political fortune.

== Legal challenges ==
Chandraswami has been accused repeatedly of some global big deals and financial irregularity activities.

1. In the mid-1980s, Chandraswami acted as an intermediary between the Sultan of Brunei, British businessman Tiny Rowland (Lonrho), and Mohamed Al-Fayed during the bitter corporate battle over the House of Fraser (owner of Harrods), including secretly recording conversations that later surfaced in British inquiries.
2. St. Kitts Forgery Case: His alleged role in fabricating documents in 1989 to discredit former PM V. P. Singh's son, Ajeya Singh, and his subsequent acquittal by a Delhi court in October 2004 due to lack of evidence.
3. In 1996 he was arrested on charges of defrauding a London-based businessman of $100,000. He has faced charges for repeated violation of the Foreign Exchange Regulation Act.[1] An income-tax raid on his ashram is reported to have uncovered original drafts of payments to Adnan Khashoggi of $11 million. In its report, the Jain Commission dedicated a volume to his alleged involvement in the assassination of Rajiv Gandhi. Seventeen years after the assassination of Rajiv Gandhi, the Enforcement Directorate was still investigating his alleged role as financier of the killing. In May 2009, the Supreme Court granted Chandraswami permission to travel abroad, lifting a ban on overseas travel imposed as a result of his alleged involvement in the assassination of Rajiv Gandhi.
4. FERA & Income Tax Raids: Details of the 1995 Income Tax raids on his ashram (which reportedly uncovered financial drafts linked to Adnan Khashoggi) alongside the June 2011, The Supreme Court of India fined Chandraswami for violating the Foreign Exchange Regulation Act, and order upholding the ₹9 crore FERA penalty.

== Death ==
Chandraswami died of multiple organ failure at Apollo Hospital, Indraprastha in New Delhi on 23 May 2017. Some of his followers believe that he was given slow poison while admitted into the hospital.
