= 2022 Narendra Modi security breach =

Incident in Punjab, India

- Part of 2020–2021 Indian farmers' protest and 2022 Punjab Legislative Assembly election
- Location within Punjab Location within India
- Date: 5 January 2022
- Time: Afternoon (IST)
- Location: near Piareana village, Firozpur district, Punjab, India; 30.8833593°N 74.7182912°E
- Type: Security lapse
- Target: Convoy of Narendra Modi, Prime Minister of India
- Outcome: Rally cancelled; Prime Minister returned to Bathinda Airport
- Deaths: None
- Injuries: None

The 2022 Narendra Modi security breach in Punjab occurred on 5 January 2022, when Prime Minister Narendra Modi’s convoy was stranded for around 20 minutes on a flyover near Hussainiwala in Firozpur district, Punjab, after protesters blocked the route. The Ministry of Home Affairs termed it a “major lapse” in the Prime Minister’s security, leading to judicial inquiries, disciplinary action against Punjab police officials, and political controversy ahead of the 2022 Punjab Legislative Assembly elections.

== Background ==
The incident took place in the aftermath of the 2020–2021 Indian farmers’ protest, during which Punjab was a major center of demonstrations against the three farm laws passed by the central government.

On 5 January 2022, Modi was scheduled to travel to Firozpur to lay the foundation stone of development projects worth over ₹42,000 crore and to address a rally, just weeks before the Punjab Legislative Assembly elections.

== Incident ==
Due to poor weather, Modi’s planned helicopter journey from Bathinda to Firozpur was cancelled, and he proceeded by road. About 30 km from Hussainiwala, his convoy was halted on a flyover near Piareana village after a group of protesters blocked the route. The convoy remained stranded for approximately 20 minutes before turning back to the Bathinda airport, cutting short the visit.

The location where Modi was stuck was only a few kilometres from the India–Pakistan border, raising additional concerns about security risks.

== Aftermath ==
The Ministry of Home Affairs described the blockade as a “major security lapse” and sought a detailed report from the Punjab government.

The Prime Minister’s programme in Firozpur, including the foundation stone-laying ceremony and his address at rally, was cancelled. Other leaders, including former Punjab Chief Minister Amarinder Singh and BJP MP Hans Raj Hans, addressed the gathering in his absence. The incident triggered a political storm, with the ruling Bharatiya Janata Party (BJP) accusing the Punjab government of negligence, while the state government argued the route was cleared in advance.

== Reactions ==
The incident drew sharp political reactions across India. The Bharatiya Janata Party (BJP) accused the Congress-led Punjab government of failing in its duty and endangering the Prime Minister’s life. In response, then Punjab Chief Minister Charanjit Singh Channi denied that there was any security lapse, stating that the visit had been managed in accordance with protocol and that Modi’s change of route had been communicated at the last minute.

== Investigation and report ==
The Supreme Court of India stayed parallel inquiries launched by the central and Punjab governments and formed an independent committee led by former Justice Indu Malhotra.

In November 2023, the Punjab government suspended seven police officials, including a superintendent of police, for negligence.

In January 2025, arrest warrants were issued against 25 farmer leaders in connection with the blockade.

== See also ==
- 2020–2021 Indian farmers' protest
- Assassination of Indira Gandhi
- 2013 Patna bombings
- Assassination attempts on prime ministers of India
- Special Protection Group
