= Donald Hewagama =

Sri Lankan lawyer (1926–2009)

Brigadier Donald Hewagama
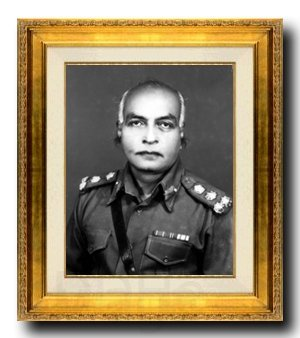
- Born: 22 October 1926; Payagala, Kalutara, British Ceylon
- Died: 18 December 2009 (aged 83)
- Military career
- Allegiance: Sri Lanka
- Branch: Sri Lanka Army
- Rank: Brigadier
- Other work: Judge Advocate General

Brigadier Donald Danister Hewagama (1926-2009) was a Sri Lankan lawyer. He was the Judge Advocate General to the three Armed Forces of Sri Lanka.

== Early life and education ==
Born on 22 October 1926 in Payagala, Kalutara, to Arthur Hewagama and Mabel Alexandria Wijesinghe Jayewardene. His father was a grandson of Hewagamage H. Appuhamy and his mother was a cousin of J. R. Jayewardene, who would become President of Sri Lanka in the 1978. Hewagama was educated at Nalanda College Colombo, where he was a cadet in the school cadet platoon, member of College Literary Association and leader of the college debating team. Graduating from University of Ceylon, he entered Ceylon Law College to study law.

== Early legal career ==
Following his legal studies at the Ceylon Law College, he apprenticed under H. W. Jayawardena, QC and A. C. Gunaratne before being called to the bar as an Advocate of the Supreme Court of Ceylon in 1958. After qualifying as an advocate, Hewagama assisted his cousin J. R. Jayewardene in his parliamentary campaign in the Kelaniya Electoral District by managing his election funds. He joined the Legal Draftsmen Department in 1964 as an Assistant Legal Draftsman serving till 1967.

== Military service ==
In 1967 Mr.Donald Hewagama joined the Army Legal Services, succeeding Colonel Noel Jansz as the Judge Advocate General having been commissioned as a lieutenant colonel. Serving as the Judge Advocate General from 1967 to 1982, he was promoted to the rank of colonel and then finally to brigadier. This position was a unique designation as per the then three Acts (laws) governing the Army, Navy and the Air Force in Sri Lanka. Then the “Judge Advocate General” was appointed by the Head of State (Prime Minister) and was the head of judicial services to all three Armed Forces in Sri Lanka. Donald Hewagama was the last to hold this unique position as subsequently after almost twenty years of his retirement, as no official filled this vacancy, the judicial services were separated for the three armed forces and three individual officers were appointed. Later as a practice senior officers of the Attorney Generals Office were seconded to this post as “Judge Advocates”. Donald Hewagama was the last to hold this position as the “Judge Advocate General to the three Armed Forces of Sri Lanka”.

During 1971 JVP insurrection against then Sirimavo Bandaranaike Government, Lieutenant Colonel Donald D Hewagama was given an assignment to overlook the prevailing administration setup in the north central area of Sri Lanka and was sent with a convoy of armed military vehicles and on his way back from the destination he sighted a gathering of youth detained by the soldiers under emergency law in a road crossing near Warakapola area in the North Western province of the country. He immediately ordered his convoy to stop and got off from his car and held an inquiry on the spot. He found that some of these children who were not even in their teens have been used as scapegoats by the ruthless terrorists to carry their letters. He pardoned all of these children and brought them down to the Army Headquarters in Colombo to be rehabilitated and later released. He retired from the army on 22 October 1982.

== Magistrate ==
Following his retirement from the army at the age of 55 years, he served as the Colombo Harbour Magistrate and functioned as the Judge at the trial of the then Member of Parliament for Hewaheta for the offence of smuggling gold bars to Sri Lanka.

== Indo – Sri Lanka Peace Accord ==
When the Indo – Sri Lanka Peace Accord was signed by then Prime Minister of India and then President of Sri Lanka in Colombo on 29 July 1987, it was agreed to keep the Sri Lankan Armed Forces in their barracks and Indian Peace Keeping Force to disarm the insurgents who demanded a separate state within the sovereignty of Sri Lanka, the land which was shared by its inhabitants for the known history of time.

Sri Lankans as a whole saw this as a foreign domination of their motherland than disarmament of insurgents. On 30 July 1987, Prime Minister Rajiv Gandhi was assaulted by Leading Rate Vijitha Rohana at the Guard of Honour held for Gandhi in front of the Presidents House, when the Indian Prime Minister was hit with Rohana's rifle. Obvious instantaneous reaction of the world on this diabolical act was disgrace and dishonor. The sailor was apprehended and court-martialed.

When the offender was brought in front of the grand panel of military judges no one was there to defend this helpless man who assaulted the commanding chief of one of the world's mightiest armies. The retired Brigadier Donald D. Hewagama who had a distinguished carrier in the Sri Lanka Armed Forces as the Judge Advocate General to the Sri Lankan Army, Navy and the Air Force had a different view. He thought "This feeble sailor armed with an unloaded rifle stood for his land of birth and for all of its people and symbolically defended it from foreign invasion." Brigadier Donald D. Hewagama volunteered to defend the sailor with the help of former speaker of the Sri Lanka Parliament, Hon. Stanley Tillekeratne.

He died on 18 December 2009.
