= List of assassination attempts on prime ministers of India =

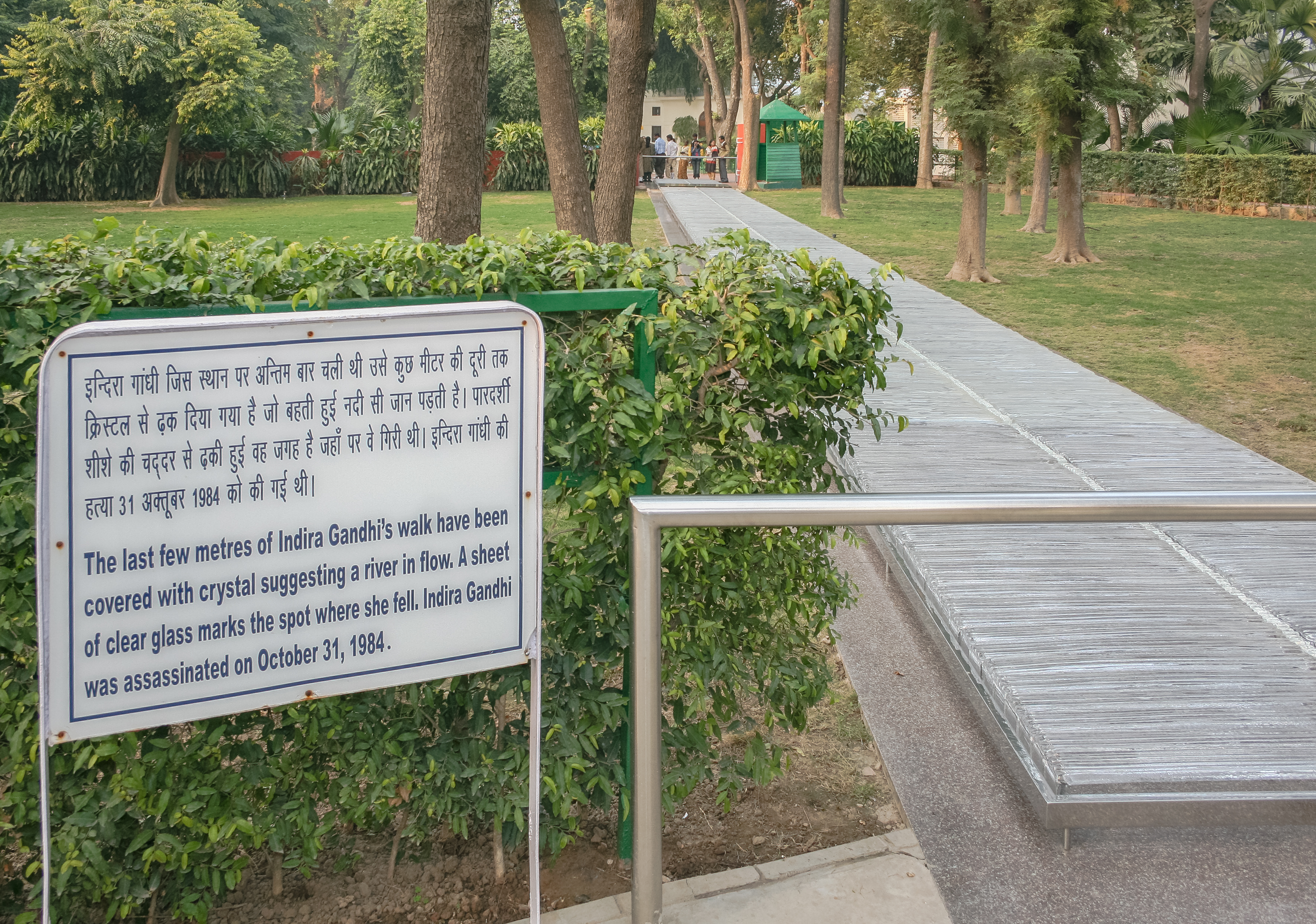
The Indira Gandhi Memorial at Delhi marks the site of the assassination of Indira Gandhi.

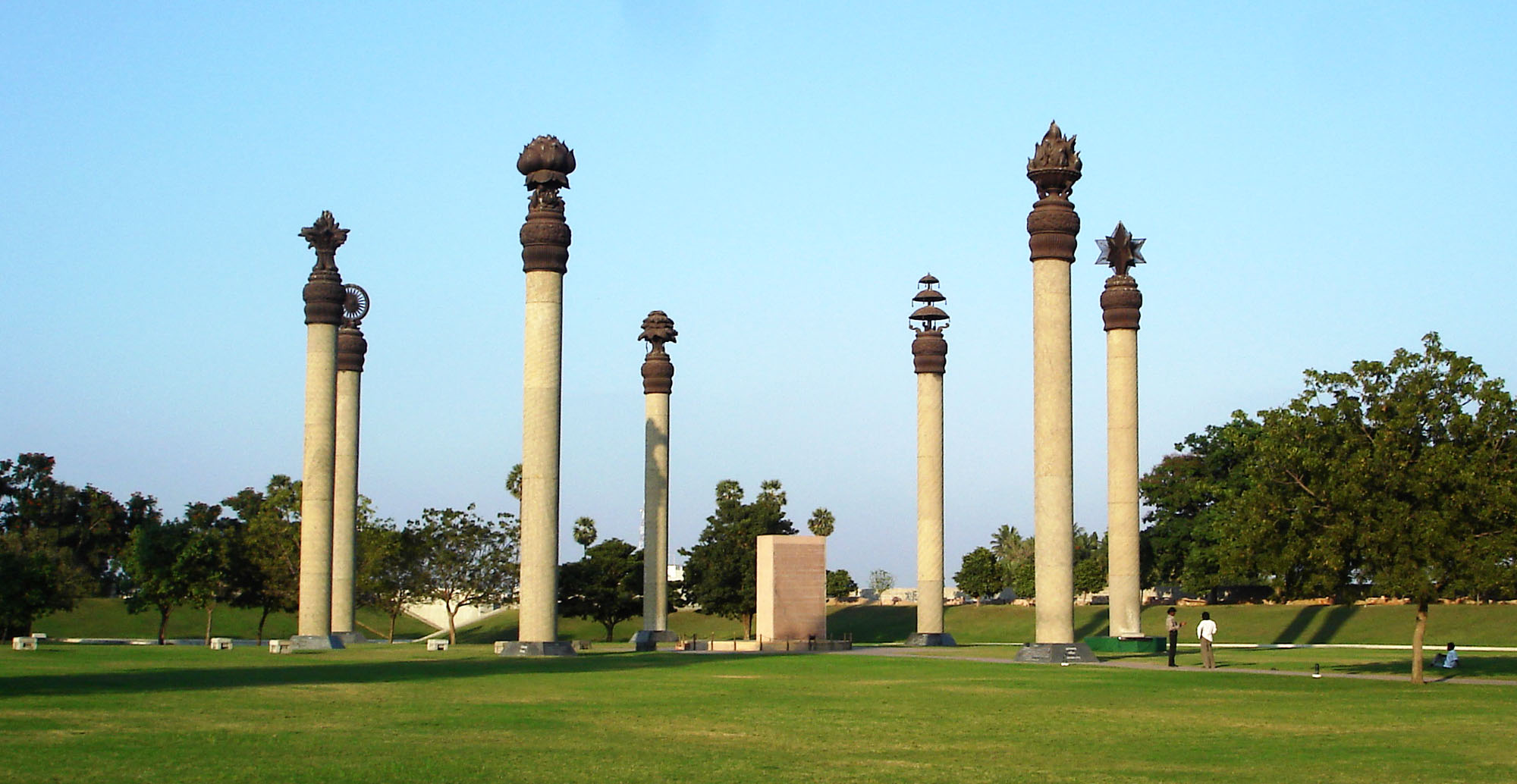
The Rajiv Gandhi Memorial at Sriperumbudur marks the site of the assassination of Rajiv Gandhi.

There have been numerous assassination attempts on prime ministers of India. The prime minister is the executive head of the Union Government of India, and is usually the most powerful person in the country.

Two prime ministers, namely Indira Gandhi and Rajiv Gandhi (former prime minister) have been assassinated.

== Assassinated prime ministers ==
Name	Date	Place	Type	Assassin(s)
Indira Gandhi	31 October 1984	New Delhi, India	Shooting	Main convicts: Beant Singh; Satwant Singh; Co-conspirator: Kehar Singh
Rajiv Gandhi (former prime minister)	21 May 1991	Sriperumbudur, Tamil Nadu, India	Suicide bombing	Main convict: Kalaivani Rajaratnam alias Dhanu alias Anbu; Co-conspirators: A. G. Perarivalan alias Arivu; Jayakumar; Ravichandran; Robert Pious; S. Nalini Sriharan; T. Suthendraraja alias Santhan; V. Sriharan alias Murugan

== Assassination attempts and plots ==
=== Jawaharlal Nehru ===
- 1947: Assassination attempt (as head of the Interim Government) during the partition of India while he was visiting the North-West Frontier Province in a car.
- 4 May 1953: An alleged attempt to bomb the Bombay–Amritsar Express in which Nehru was travelling was thwarted when the police discovered two men crouched near the railway tracks in Kalyan, Bombay State. It was later discovered that the object initially thought of as a bomb was a firecracker and the attackers had only intended to cause a sensation.
- 1955: Baburao Laxman Kochale, a knife-wielding rickshaw-puller, tried to kill Nehru near Nagpur.
- 1955: Plotted by the Central Intelligence Agency (CIA).
- 1956: A stone-throwing mob attempted to assassinate Nehru with a bomb in Bombay.
- 30 September 1961: A failed bombing attempt on train tracks in Maharashtra on a route to be followed by the Prime Minister.

=== Rajiv Gandhi ===
- January 1985: FBI found out about an attempt to assassinate Rajiv Gandhi by Sikhs in New York. They planned to use bombs and target other key locations.
- April 1985: FBI found that Sikh militants were plotting an assassination of Rajiv Gandhi and promised to give $60,000 to anyone who killed Rajiv Gandhi.
- 31 July 1985: Harjinder Singh Jinda revealed that immediately after killing Lalit Maken he took position outside of a hospital anticipating Rajiv Gandhi and Zail Singh to visit. He planned to kill them both. He was unable to get a shot because of a large crowd.
- October 1985: British police foiled a plan to assassinate Rajiv Gandhi.
- 16 June 1986: 4 Sikhs were jailed for trying to assassinate Gandhi in Leicester.
- 2 October 1986: Karamjit Singh, a Sikh gunman, fired rounds from an improvised, homemade firearm at Gandhi in Delhi, while he was leaving the Raj Ghat.
- 30 July 1987 A Sri Lankan Navy sailor Wijemuni Vijitha Rohana de Silva hit Gandhi with his rifle butt in Colombo, while he was inspecting Guard of Honour at the Sri Lankan President’s House at Colombo.
- May 1991: Iqbal Singh Fauji, deputy chief of Khalistan National Army, and other members of Khalistan National Army again planned to kill Rajiv Gandhi with sticky bombs. The plan was that while everyone threw flowers at Gandhi they would throw sticky bombs hidden in baskets of flower. Tight security led to the plan not being carried out.

== See also ==
- List of assassinations in Asia § India
- List of assassinated Indian politicians
- Assassination of Mahatma Gandhi
- 2013 Patna bombings, targeting a rally of then prime ministerial candidate Narendra Modi
