= Vijitha Rohana =

Sri Lankan sailor, astrologer and assassin (born 1965)

Wijemuni Vijitha Rohana de Silva (born 1965) is a former Sri Lankan navy sailor and astrologer. He is best known for his assault on Indian Prime Minister Rajiv Gandhi on 30 July 1987 at the President's House, Colombo, in what some claimed to be an assassination attempt.

== Early life and naval career ==
Born in Boossa, Ratgama in the Southern Province of Sri Lanka; Rohana studied at Gintota Maha Vidyalaya and passed his O Level examinations. Thereafter he joined the Sri Lanka Navy and received his weapons training at the Naval and Maritime Academy, specializing as a radioman. He was stationed at SLNS Elara in Karainagar, Jaffna taking part in the Vadamarachchi Operation. In July 1987, he was a leading rate and was transferred to Colombo and assigned the guard of honour for the visiting Indian Prime Minister, who was in Colombo to sign the Indo-Sri Lanka Accord that would result in the deployment of the Indian Peace Keeping Force.

== Assault ==
Rohana was enraged by Indian support for the Liberation Tigers of Tamil Eelam during the Sri Lankan Civil War and India's direct interference in Sri Lanka with Operation Poomalai and forcing the conclusion of the successful Vadamarachchi Operation before all its objectives were met.

The Guard of Honour was commanded by Lieutenant Mendis, who invited the Indian Prime Minister to review the guard as per tradition. Rajiv Gandhi was escorted by Lieutenant Mendis along with Sri Lankan Finance Minister Ronnie de Mel, and Sri Lankan security personnel. Vijitha Rohana swung his ceremonial Lee–Enfield rifle at the Indian Prime Minister aiming at the back of his neck. Gandhi managed to duck and miss the full brunt of the blow, even though the rifle struck him. Rohana was quickly restrained by Lieutenant Mendis and the Chief Petty Officer of the detachment along with other security personnel and Sri Lankan police.

=== Court martial ===
Vijitha Rohana faced a court martial headed by Commodore K.R.L. Perera, Group Captain Buddhi Siriwardhen and Colonel Vijaya Wimalaratne. He was charged with attempted murder and acting contrary to navy discipline and insulting a state leader. Prosecuted by Senior State Counsel Captain Raja Fernando, his defence team included Sarath Wijesinghe, Susil Premajayantha and Donald Hewagama. The defence implied that Rohana was not aiming to kill since he could have stabbed the premier with the bayonet affixed to his Lee–Enfield rifle at the time. The court martial found him guilty of attempted culpable homicide not amounting to murder and insulting the Indian Prime Minister. He was sentenced to six years in prison, however president Ranasinghe Premadasa gave him a presidential pardon two and a half years later.

== Later life ==
After his release from prison, Rohana received a degree from the University of Sri Jayewardenepura and started his own business. In the 2000 Sri Lankan parliamentary election, he ran for a seat in Parliament as a member of the Sihala Urumaya party.

Later, Rohana became an astrologer and claimed that president Maithripala Sirisena would die by 26 January 2017. This was seen as a part of another conspiracy to assassinate the president and Rohana was once again arrested.

== See also ==
- List of assassination attempts on prime ministers of India
- Indo-Sri Lanka Accord
- Vadamarachchi Operation
- Operation Poomalai
