= Judge Advocate General (Sri Lanka) =

The Judge Advocate General (JAG) is the chief of the combined legal and judicial system of the three branches of the armed forces in Sri Lanka. They hold full authority over all legal and judicial matters concerning the Army, Navy and the Air Force of Sri Lanka. The authority to appoint the Judge Advocate General (JAG) is exclusively vested with the Head of State, the President of the Democratic Socialist Republic of Sri Lanka.

In the absence of the JAG, the Judge Advocate (JA) in the Sri Lankan Armed Forces is the legal and judicial chief of the respective service appointed by the Commander of that armed force. The Sri Lanka Army, Sri Lanka Navy and the Sri Lanka Air Force has its own legal branch with legally qualified officers. Each service may have its own Judge Advocate, held by an office of the rank of Major General, Brigadier, Rear Admiral, Commodore or Air Commodore. Judge Advocate General of a certain service may preside over and court martial on another service. JA officers provide legal help to the military in all aspects, in particular advising the presiding officers of courts-martial on military law. Appointment could be made to a serving legal officer or lawyer outside the service, normally a senior member of the Attorney-General's Department.

== List of JAG and JA ==
Army

- Brigadier Donald Hewagama (1967–1982)
- Brigadier Indira Wijeratne
- Major General Edward Jayasinghe ( -2022)
- Brigadier Raveendra Pathiranage

Navy

- Rear Admiral Justice Mark Damien Hugh Fernando, PC
- Rear Admiral Palitha Fernando, PC
