= 2013 Patna bombings =

Bombing attacks in an attempt to assassinate Narendra Modi in Bihar, India

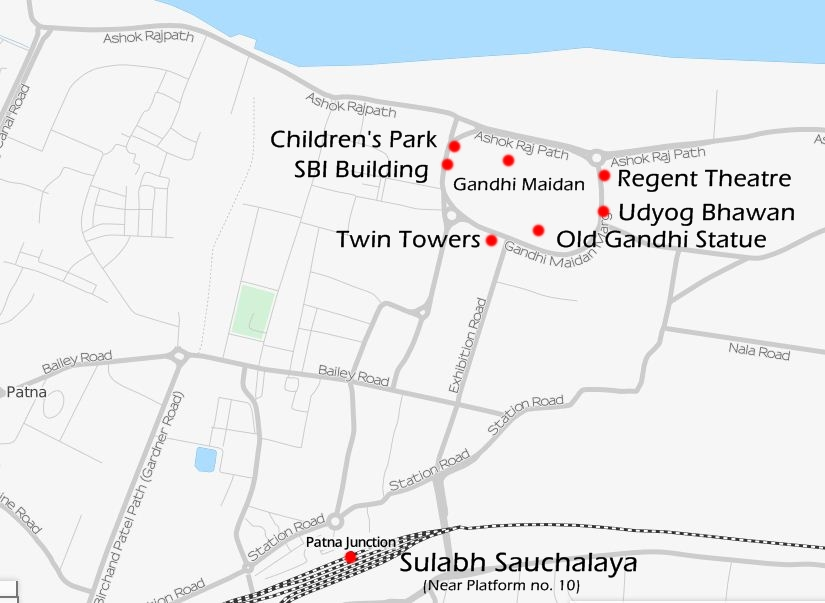
- Map of the 2013 Patna attacks
- Location: 25°36′28.77″N 85°10′03.06″E * Patna Junction railway station: Multiple locations at Gandhi Maidan Marg, Patna, Bihar, India
- Date: 27 October 2013 (UTC+05:30)
- Target: Narendra Modi and his supporters
- Attack type: Bombings, mass murder, assassination attempt
- Weapon: Eight crude bombs
- Deaths: 6
- Injuries: 85
- Perpetrators: Indian Mujahideen; Students' Islamic Movement of India
- Accused: 10
- Verdict: Death sentence (4 convicts); life imprisonment (2 convicts); 10 years imprisonment (2 convicts); 7 years imprisonment (1 convict)
- Convicted: 9

On 27 October 2013, a series of bomb blasts rocked the Indian city of Patna, Bihar at a large election rally for Narendra Modi, the then Bharatiya Janata Party candidate for Prime Minister. Of the estimated 300,000 participants at the "Hunkar" rally, six people were killed and 85 others were injured in eight bomb blasts.

No one initially claimed responsibility for the bombings. In 2021, members of the Indian Mujahideen, who had been the initial suspects, and the Students' Islamic Movement of India were convicted of carrying out the attacks.

== Bombings ==
On the morning of 27 October 2013, the first bomb exploded at Patna Junction railway station at around 10:00, while two unexploded bombs were recovered by bomb disposal personnel. The second bomb exploded at 12:10, while the third bomb exploded at 12:25, both near Gandhi Maidan, where the Bharatiya Janata Party's Prime Ministerial candidate Narendra Modi was supposed to hold a rally in the lead-up to the 2014 Indian general election a couple of hours later. There were five other blasts from which three bombs exploded in and out of the Gandhi Maidan Marg, one exploded near a cinema hall and another close to the Twin Tower building complex in Patna.

The chronology of the bombings were:

- 09:30 Public Toilet
- 11:40 near Udyog Bhawan
- 12:05 near eastern side of Regent Cinema
- 12:10 near Mahatma Gandhi Statue at Gandhi Maidan
- 12:15 near Twin Towers of southern periphery of Gandhi Maidan
- 12:20 near State Bank of India (western Gandhi Maidan)
- 12:25 near Children's Park (North-western side)
- 13:35 Modi started his speech.
- 17:15 inside Gandhi Maidan

=== Railway station ===
A crude bomb exploded on an isolated place on platform 10 of Patna Junction railway station. One person who sustained injuries in this blast died. According to Railway Protection Force, the explosion took place at a paid toilet within the station. Two more homemade bombs were defused. According to the Union Home Ministry, one of the two crude bombs placed had a timer attached to it.

=== Gandhi Maidan ===
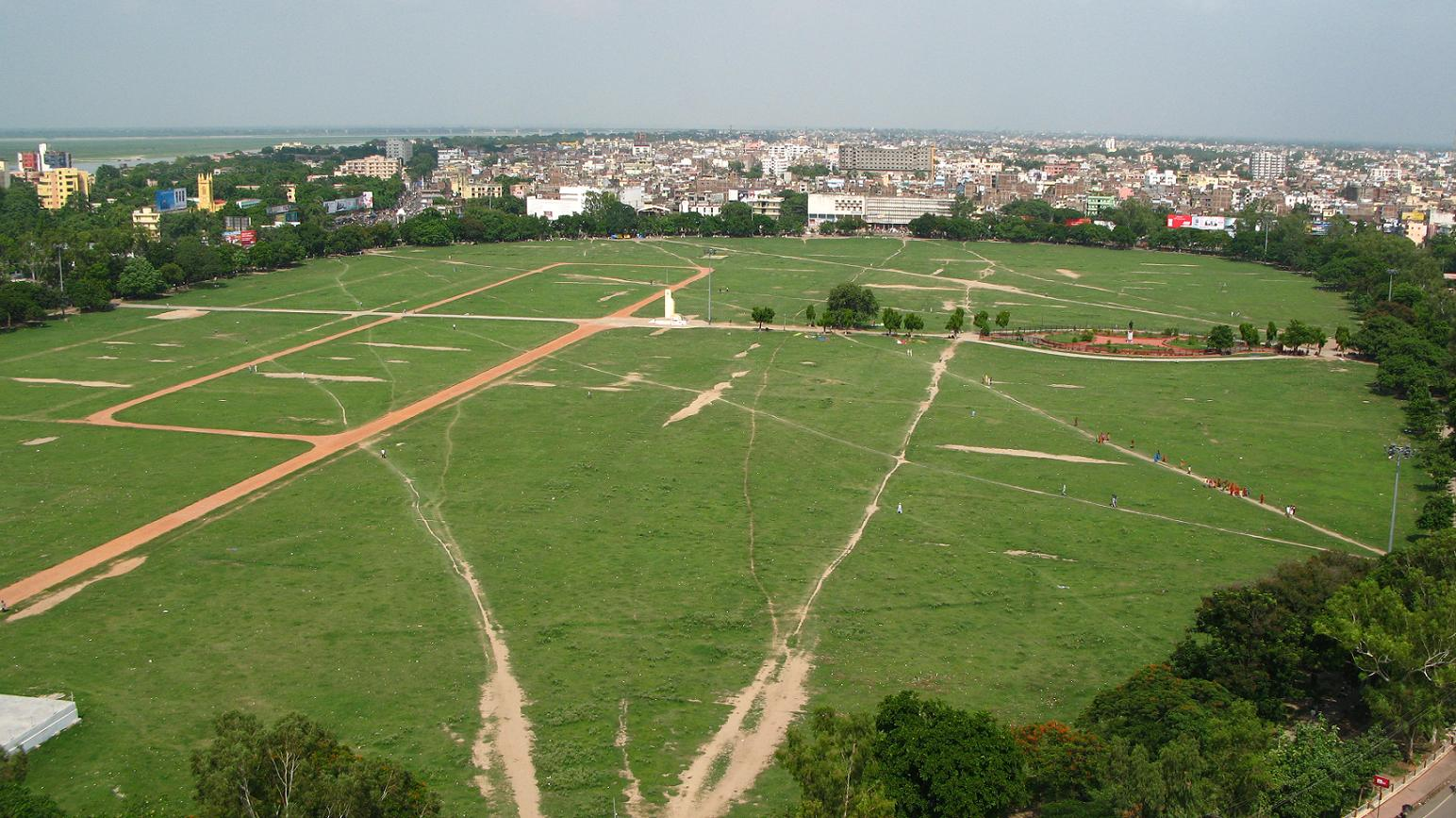
Gandhi Maidan was the venue of Narendra Modi's rally

Later that day, five more low intensity blasts took place in Gandhi Maidan, where the pre-election rally of Narendra Modi was taking place. Several people were injured in these blasts. One more blast took place in the Elphinstine Cinema near Gandhi Maidan, injuring six people. One more unexploded bomb was found below the dais where Narendra Modi had spoken from during the rally, which has been defused. However, it was not confirmed how only a single bomb didn’t explode while others did. The eighth bomb exploded around 5 PM on the same day, which was believed to be hidden under garbage. The attackers are still unknown.

== Reactions ==
Prime Minister of India Manmohan Singh condemned the blasts and spoke to Bihar Chief Minister Nitish Kumar asking him to hasten a probe into the incidents. The Union Home Ministry sent NIA and NSG teams to the blast sites for investigate. Union Minister of State for Home Affairs R. P. N. Singh assured the Bihar government that the union government would provide all assistance in investigating the blast incident. For his part, Kumar condemned the blasts and said that his government had provided full security for the rally. He also revealed that a suspicious suitcase was found in Gandhi Maidan two days previously and henceforth security would be beefed up. He also cancelled his scheduled trip of Munger and convened a meeting on the law and order situation. Narendra Modi expressed his condolences for the bomb blast victims online. A week after the blast, Modi returned to Bihar to offer condolences and Rs. 500,000 to the families of the six people killed in the attack. Dense fog allowed him to visit only three families while the other three were contacted over the phone.

Former Deputy CM of Bihar Sushil Kumar Modi called it a deliberate administrative failure and criminal negligence and wrong on Twitter: "When I saw 3 blast in Gandhi Maidan, I ranged DGP Bihar. He said that truck tyre has burst." [sic]

An Indian National Congress leader, Shakeel Ahmad, wrote: "Blasts during Modi Ji's 1st visit as PM hopeful to Bihar should be condemned by one and all. State govt and NIA should unearth the conspiracy." [sic] INC General Secretary Digvijaya Singh said: "What a coincidence blast at Patna Railway on the day of Modi's Rally ! Challenge to Nitish Govt to find the culprit !."

Jamaat-e-Islami Hind General Secretary Nusrat Ali called for strong action against those who carried out the attacks.

Hours after the attacks Union Home Minister Sushilkumar Shinde was spotted at the music launch party of Bollywood movie Rajjo along with Kangana Ranaut. Several political parties, including the national Bharatiya Janata Party and Communist Party of India criticised his presence immediately after the blasts.

== Investigation ==
Within days of the blasts, the Nitish Kumar government in Bihar requested Union Home Minister Sushilkumar Shinde to have the National Investigation Agency (NIA) take over the case. As terrorists were planting the bombs at Patna Junction railway station, one of the bombs prematurely exploded due to a wiring error. One of the suspects planting the bomb, Tarique alias Ainul was critically injured in the blast and died a few days later. Patna police converged on the scene of the blast and apprehended Imtiaz Ansari as he was attempting to flee in possession of explosives. Interrogation of Imtiaz Ansari revealed that the bombings were coordinated by Indian Mujahideen, a Pakistani-linked Muslim terrorist group operating out of India. Ansari confessed that the goal was to ring the rally ground with bombs and cause stampede during the rally to kill as many of the participants, particularly women and children, as possible. However, as the blasts went off, BJP officials organising the rally led the crowd to believe they were fire crackers and appealed for calm, thus averting a much greater loss of life and foiling the Indian Mujahideen's plans of inciting a deadly stampede that could have killed hundreds. In the initial days of the investigation, six suspects were detained for interrogation based on leads obtained by police from Imtiaz Ansari.

Investigators believe Mohammad Tehsin Akhtar alias Monu to be the mastermind behind the serial blasts, and the second-highest ranking leader of the terrorist outfit, Indian Mujahideen. Tehsin had been radicalized at a madrasa in Chikmagalur, Karnataka in 2005 and has moved up the ranks in the terrorist group since then. After the blasts, the terrorist mastermind Tehsin Akhtar was revealed by news media as the nephew of Taqui Akhtar, a leader of the Janata Dal (United), party which is currently in power in Bihar led by Chief Minister Nitish Kumar. Taqui publicly disowned his nephew after reports of his involvement in the serial blasts arose in the media.

The Gujarat Director General of Police lambasted the Bihar government for lack of cooperation and a lax approach to security for the rally despite receiving general intelligence inputs from the Intelligence Bureau (IB) of possible blasts during Modi's rally. He said that basic procedures mandatory for all public meetings, such as anti-sabotage checks and pre-event drills were not carried out by the Bihar Police despite requests made by Gujarat Police officials. BJP leaders, including former Bihar Deputy Chief Minister, Sushil Kumar Modi, asserted that the security lapses were a deliberate, possibly criminal attempt by the Bihar Chief Minister, Nitish Kumar, to take revenge on his political enemy, Narendra Modi. Nitish Kumar rejected this charge saying that he had directed police to make all necessary security arrangements for the event.

On 5 November 2013, a tip-off in tracking one of the suspected masterminds of the blasts led the National Intelligence Agency to a small hotel in Ranchi, Jharkhand, 350 kilometers from Patna, where they discovered 9 live bombs just like those used in the Patna blasts. Police suspect that the Patna bomb blast suspects have been staying at this hotel. By April 2014, NIA had arrested eight suspects for their alleged involvement in the explosions.

=== Chargesheet ===
On 24 April 2014, NIA filed the first chargesheet in the matter against Imtiaz Ansari under various provisions of the Indian Penal Code, Explosive Substances Act and other laws at an NIA special court. Cash rewards ranging from Rs. 5 lakh to Rs. 10 lakh have been declared for the arrest of the absconding accused—Mujibullah, Hyder Ali, Numan and Taufiq Ansari.

== Verdict ==
The special NIA court convicted nine people (Imtiaz Ansari, Mujibullah, Haider Ali, Firoz Aslam, Omar Ansari, Iftekhar, Ahmed Husain, Umair Siddiqui and Azharuddin) in October 2021 while one person (Fakhruddin) was acquitted due to lack of evidence. Four of them were awarded capital punishment while two others were sentenced life imprisonment. Ten years in jail for two people and seven years in jail for one person was sentenced.

== See also ==
- List of assassination attempts on prime ministers of India
