= Indira Gandhi Memorial =

Museum in New Delhi

Coordinates: 28°36′01″N 77°12′22″E

The Indira Gandhi Memorial is a museum established to commemorate India's first and the only female Prime Minister Indira Gandhi. It is housed in the building where Gandhi lived with her family during her premiership and where she was assassinated. The museum contains material remains of Gandhi and her son Rajiv Gandhi.

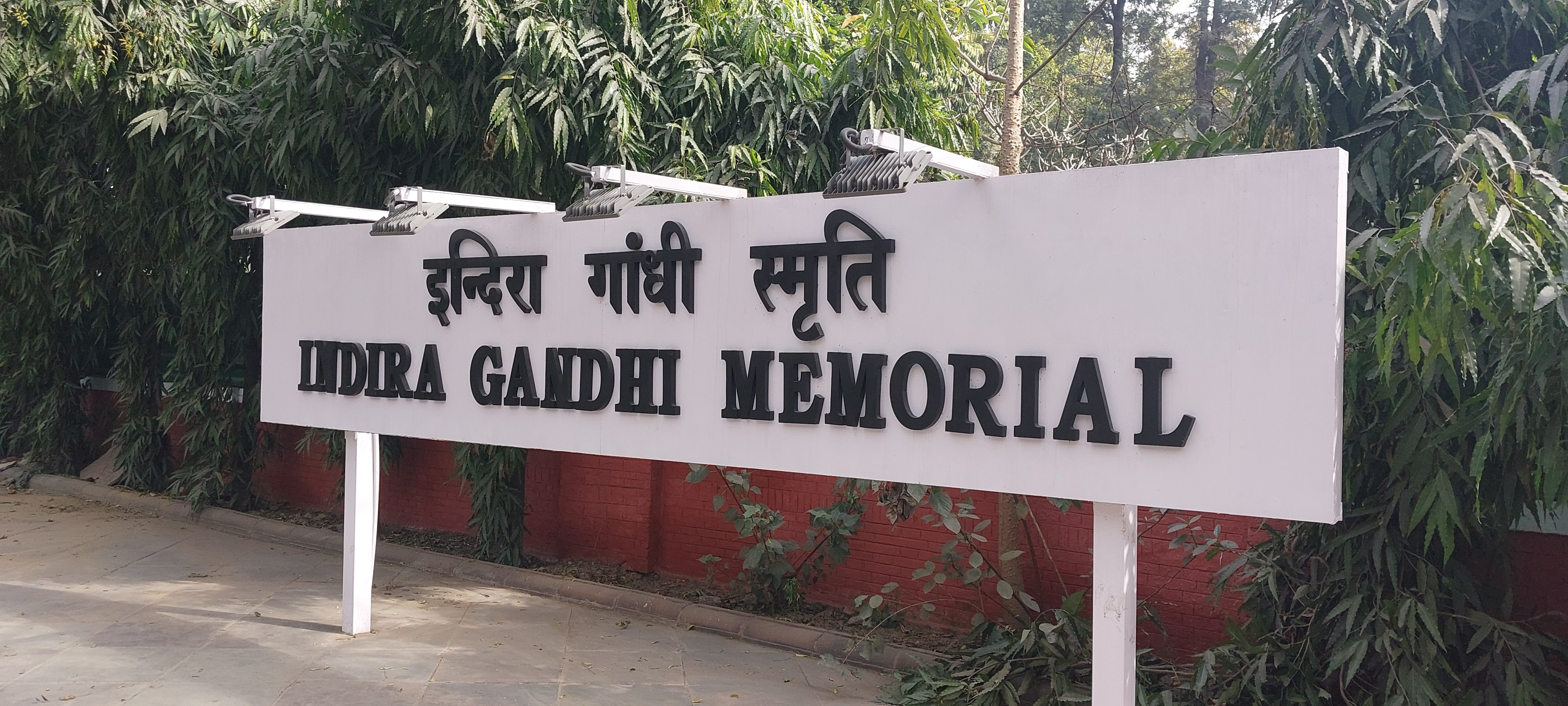
Indira Gandhi Memorial

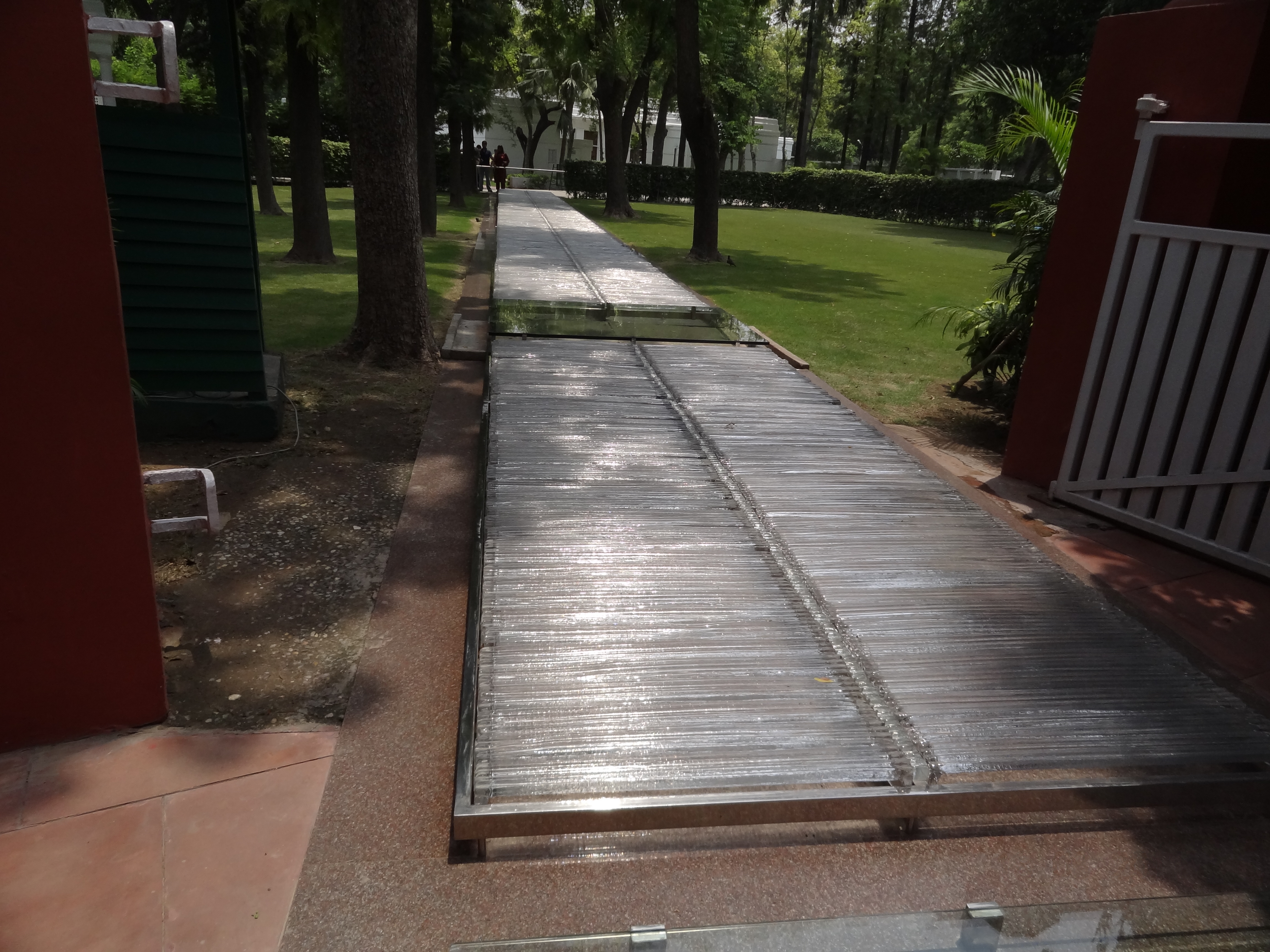
The spot where Gandhi was shot down is marked by a glass opening in the crystal pathway at the Indira Gandhi Memorial.

== Location, Timings and Attractions ==
- Location: No. 1, Safdarjung Road, New Delhi - 110011, India
- Timings: 9:30 AM - 5:00 PM, closed: Monday
- Attractions: Indira Gandhi memorial museum was the residence of former prime minister of India. It was later converted into a museum. One can see the collection of rare photographs of the Nationalist movement, the personal moments of Nehru-Gandhi family and her childhood.

== Rare Family Photos ==
Tucked away in various corners are intimate artefacts - her personal pens, and a collection of ceramic pottery. The museum walls serve as a sprawling photo essay of the Nehru-Gandhi family. Rare sepia-toned photographs capture intimate moments of Indira Gandhi, including childhood photos of her with her father, Jawaharlal Nehru, during the struggle for Independence. There are also candid shots of her sons, Sanjay Gandhi and Rajiv Gandhi, and her grandchildren, Priyanka Gandhi and Rahul Gandhi.

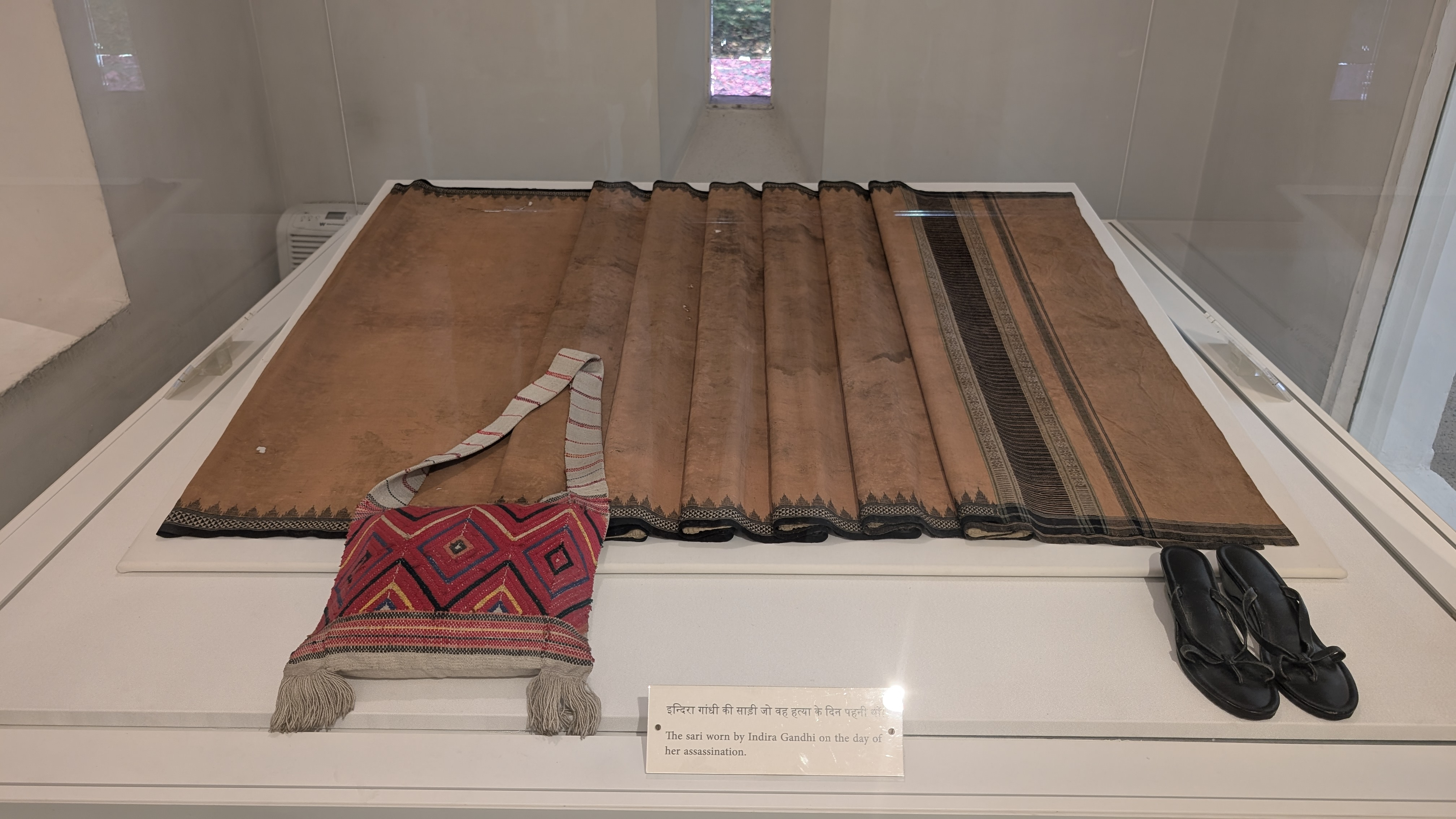
Saree worn by Indira Gandhi on day of her assassination.

== Gallery ==
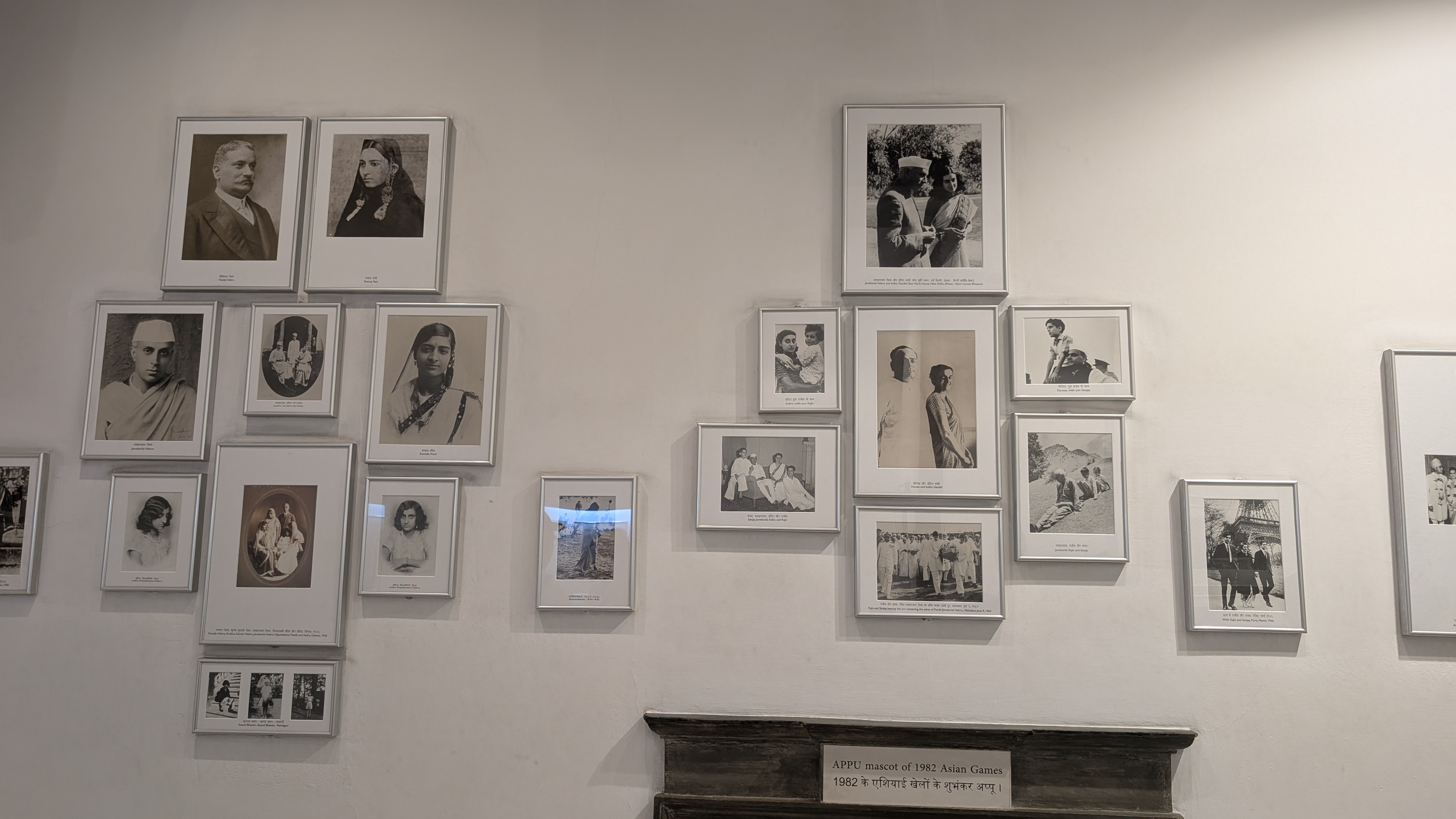
Wall showing images of Indira Gandhi

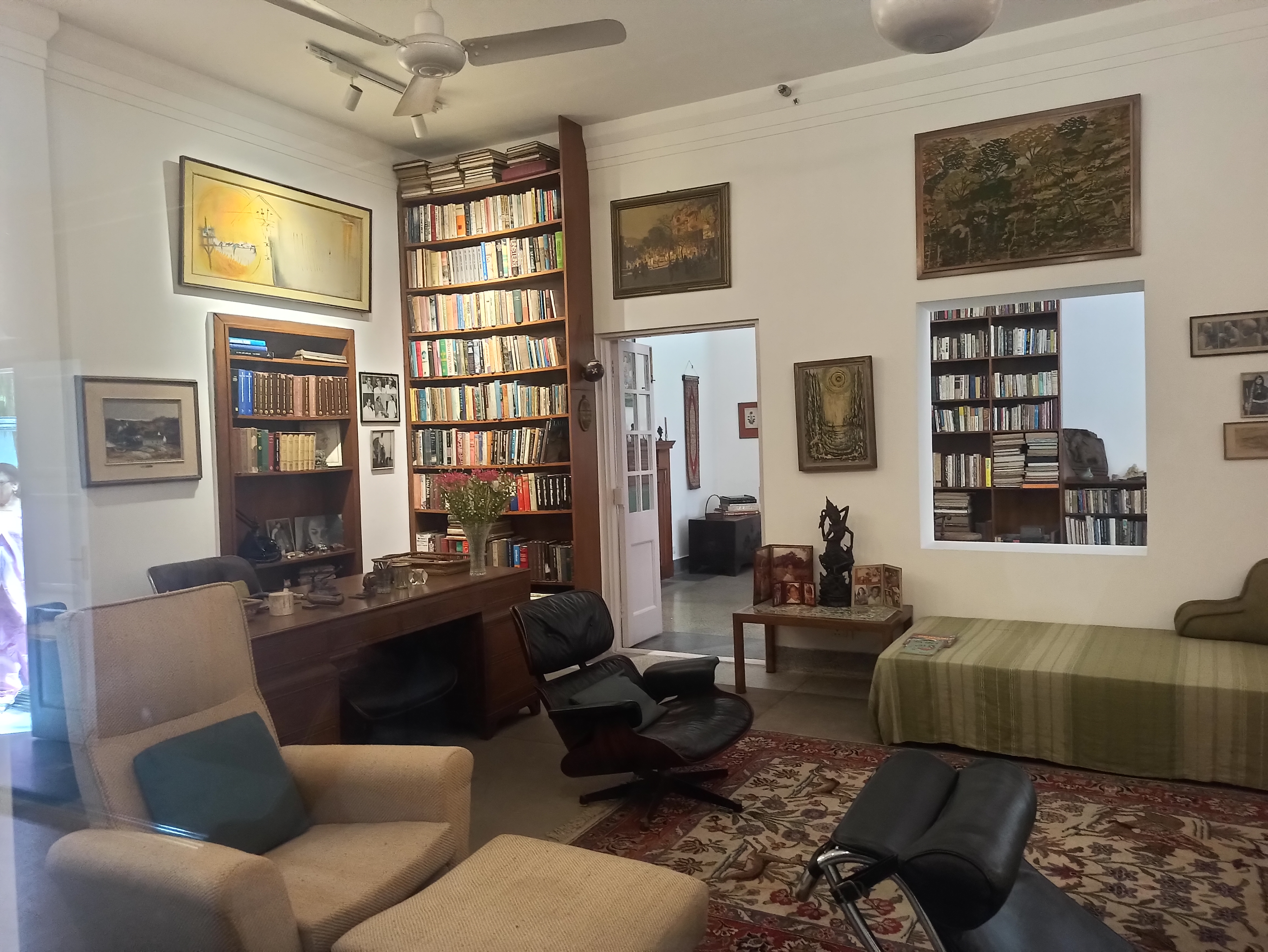
Living Room at Indira Gandhi Memorial Museum

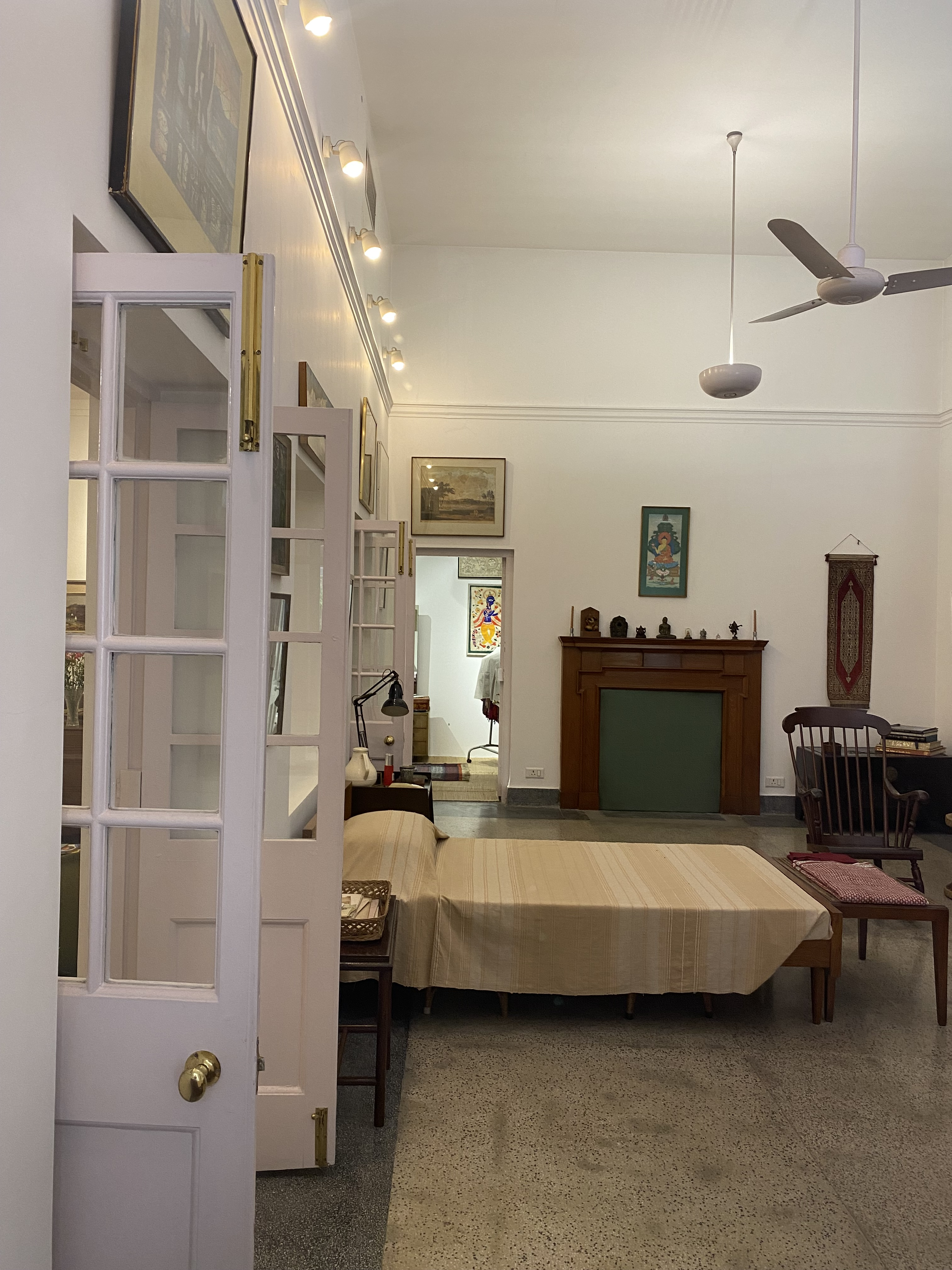
Bedroom of Indira Gandhi

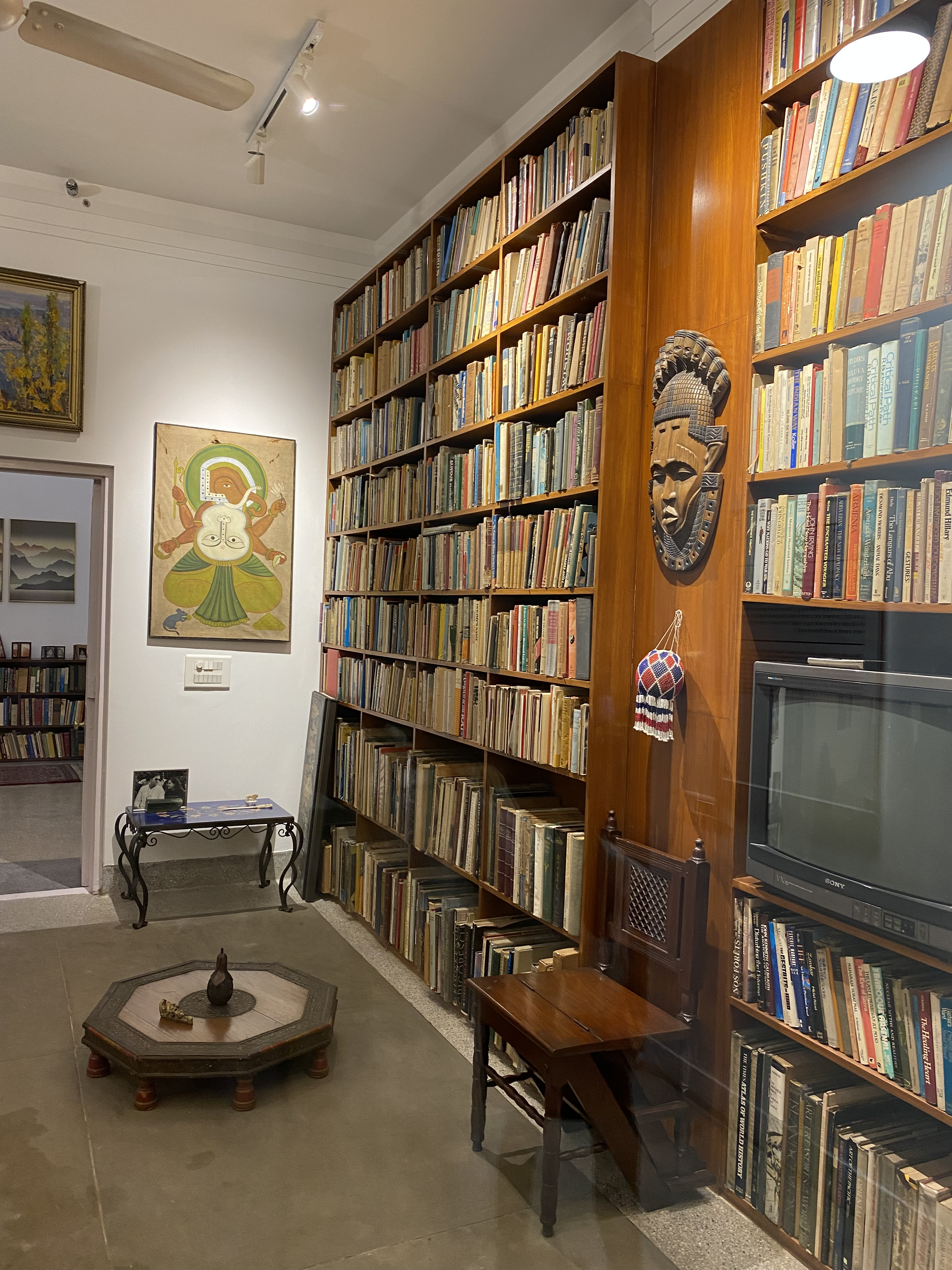
Book shelf in Indira Gandhi Memorial Museum

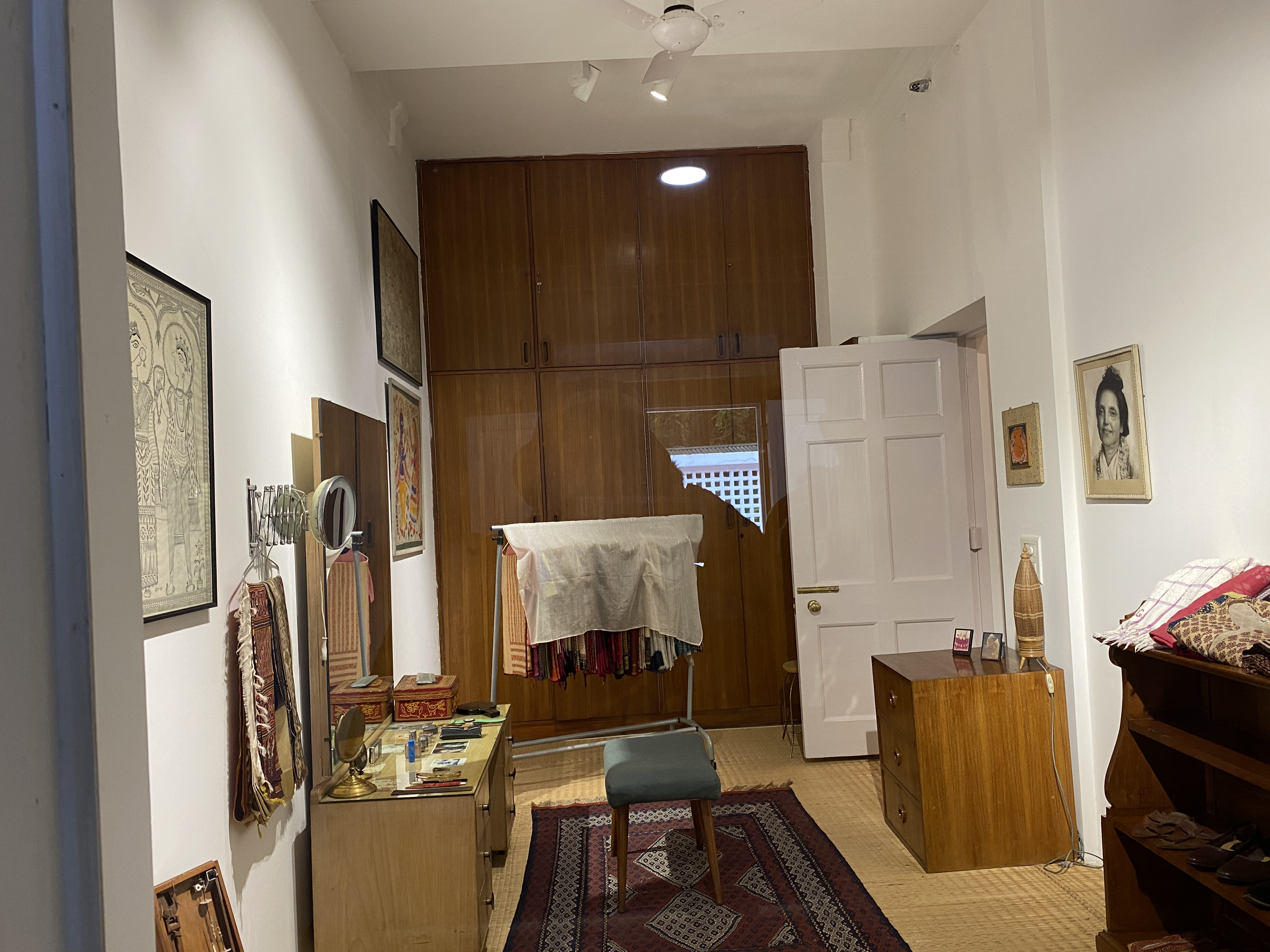
Image showing dressing table in Indira Gandhi Memorial Museum

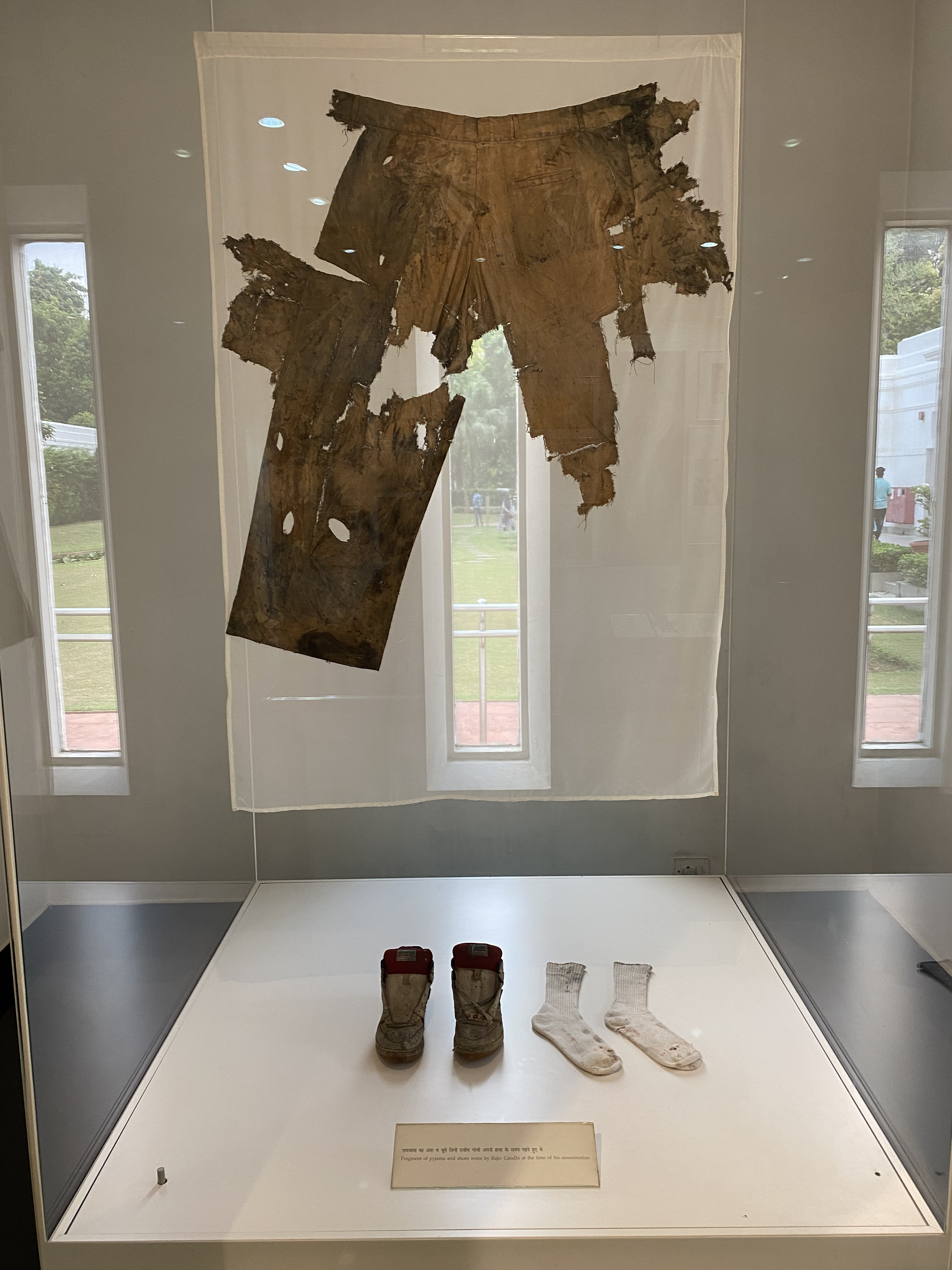
Torns of clothes worn by Rajiv Gandhi found after his assassination

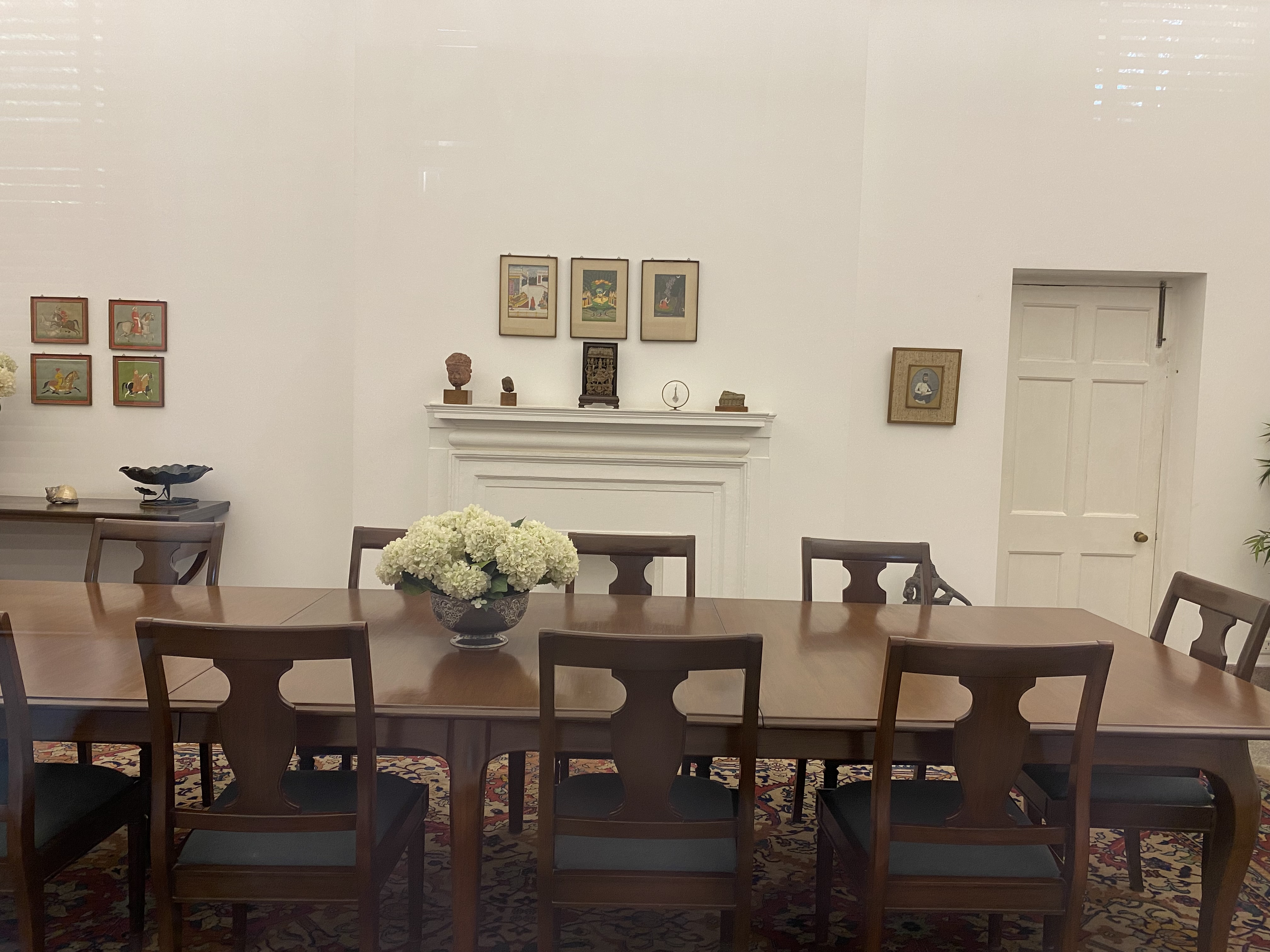
Dining table in Indira Gandhi Memorial Museum

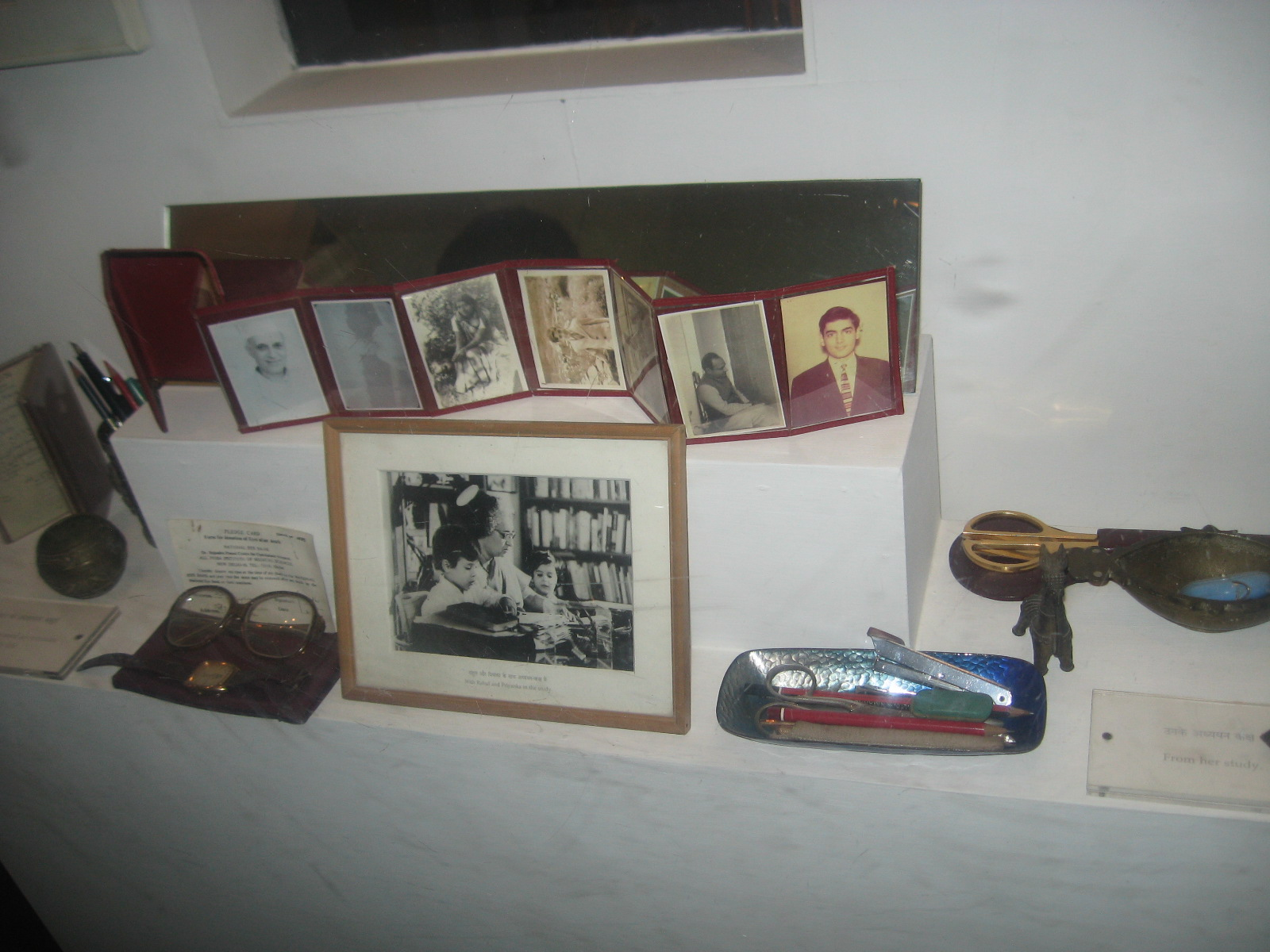
Indira Gandhi's Objects of Use

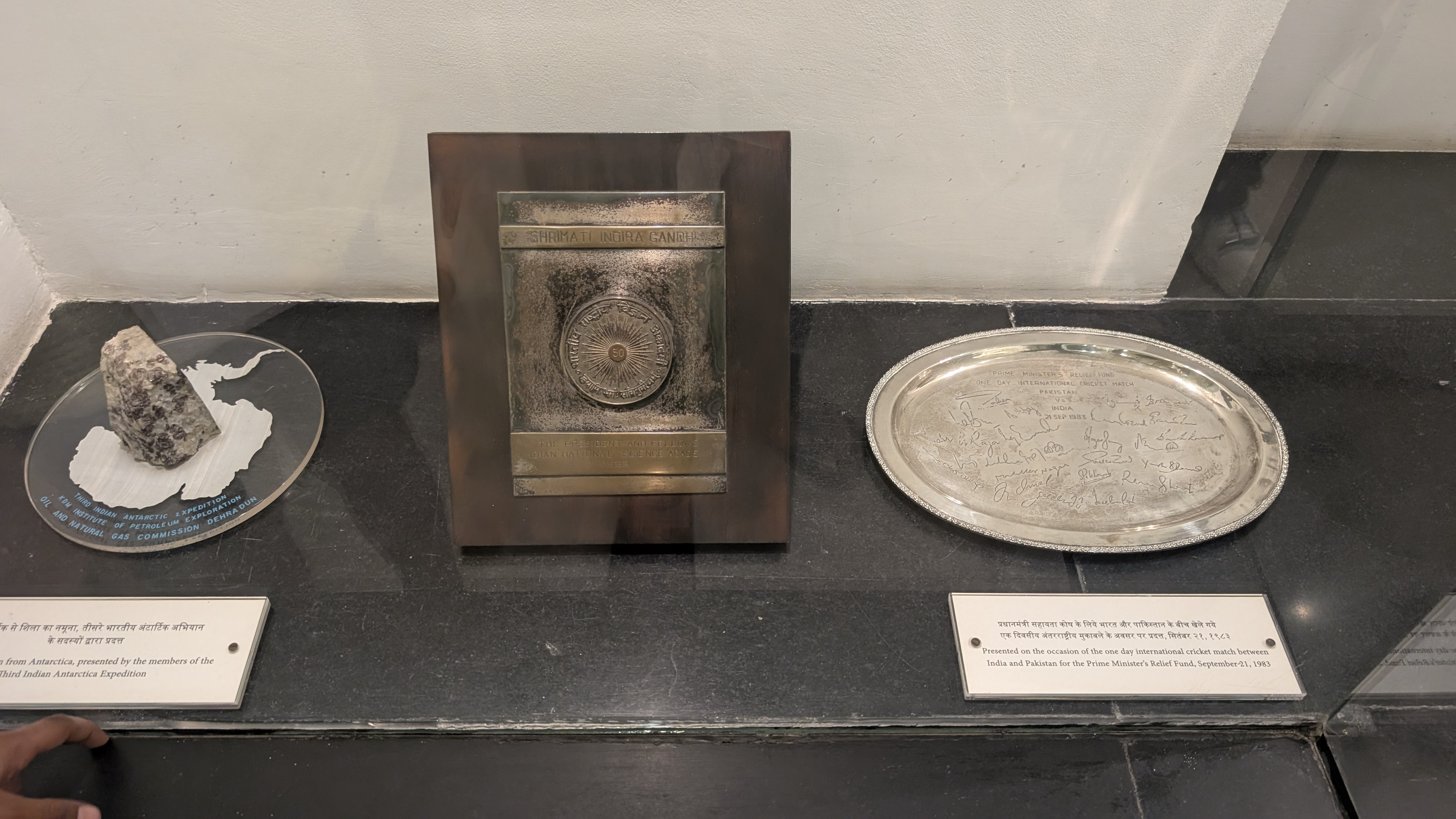
Awards won by Indira Gandhi

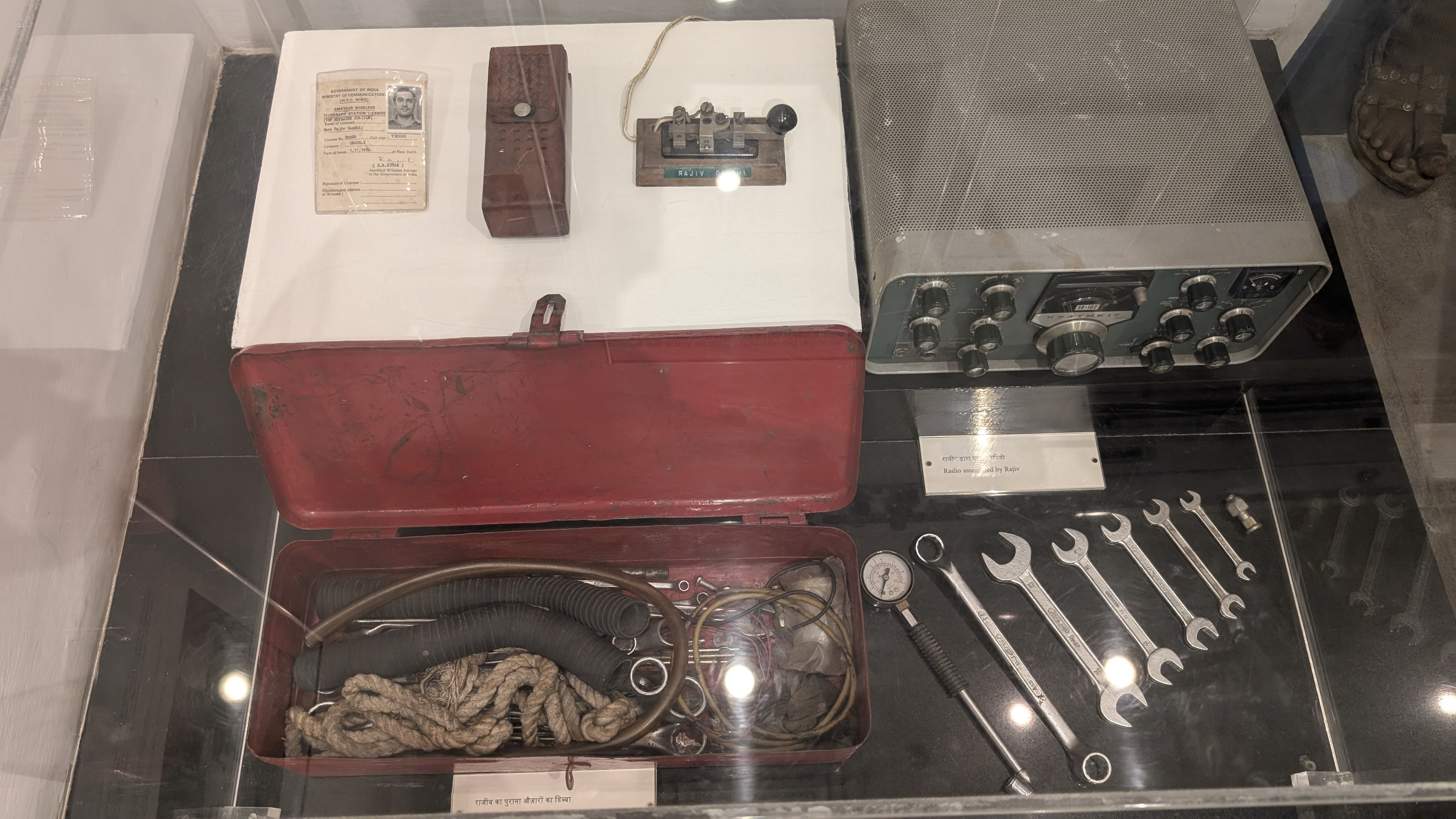
Radio and tools used by Rajiv Gandhi

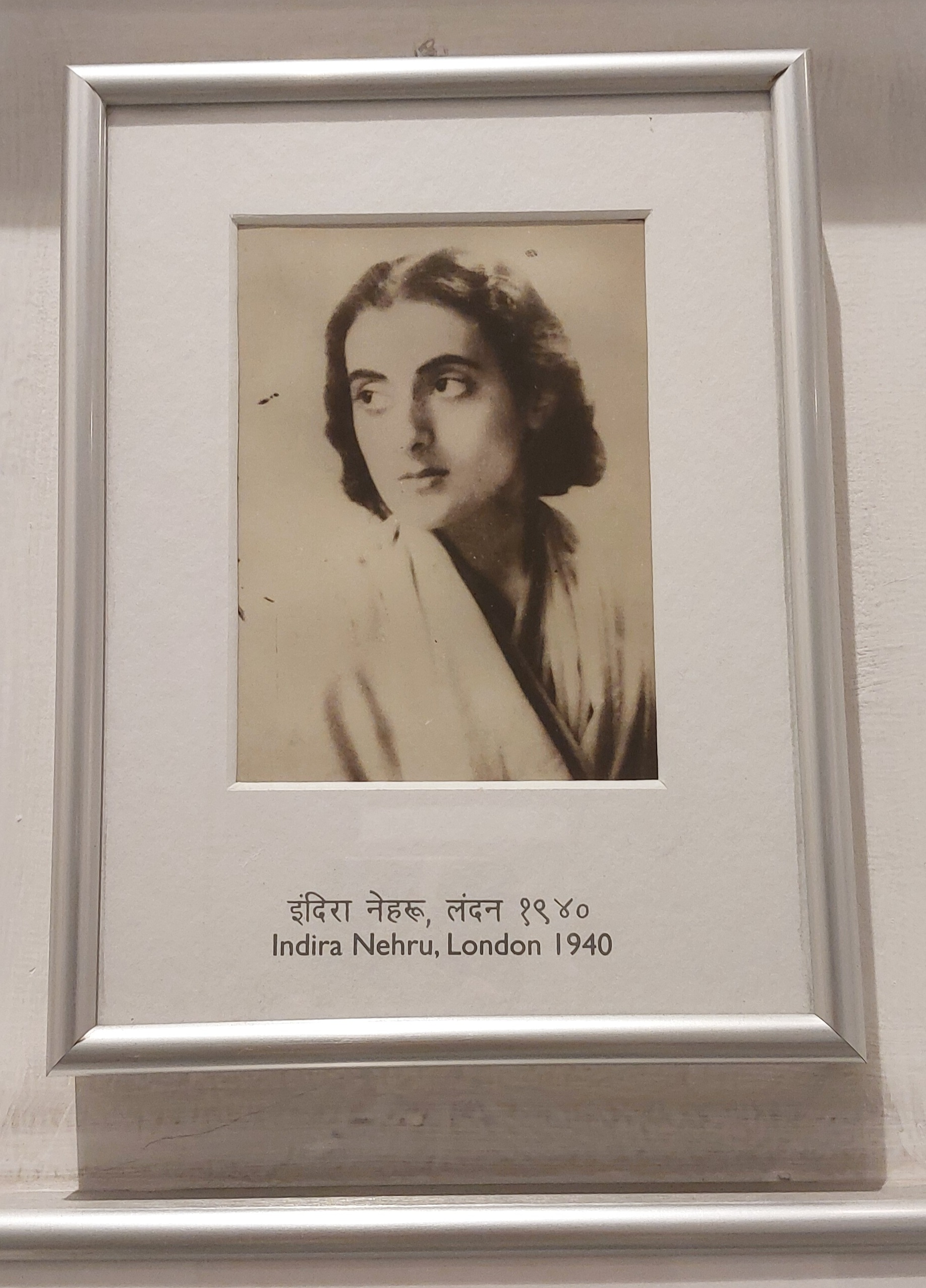
Indira Gandhi in London, 1940

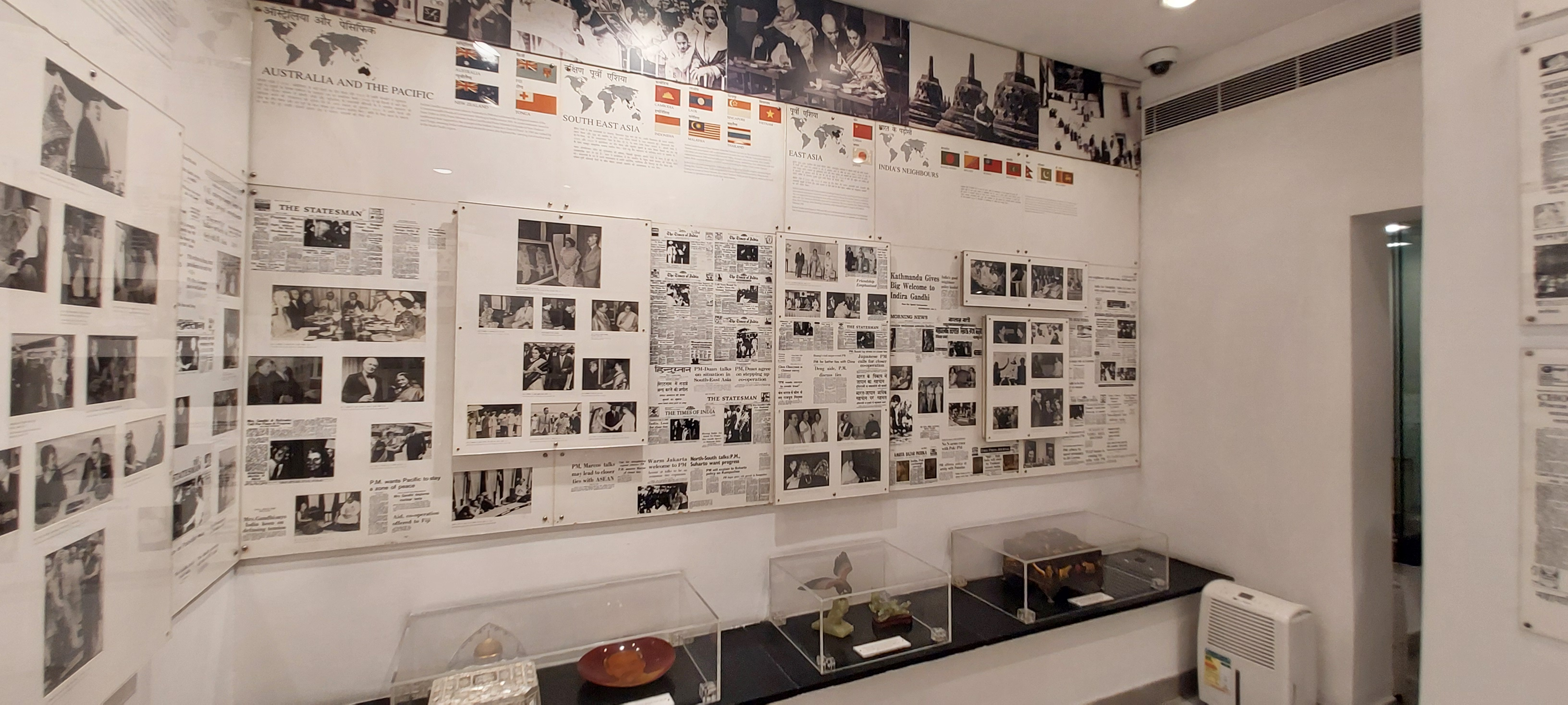
Picture gallery at Indira Gandhi Memorial Museum

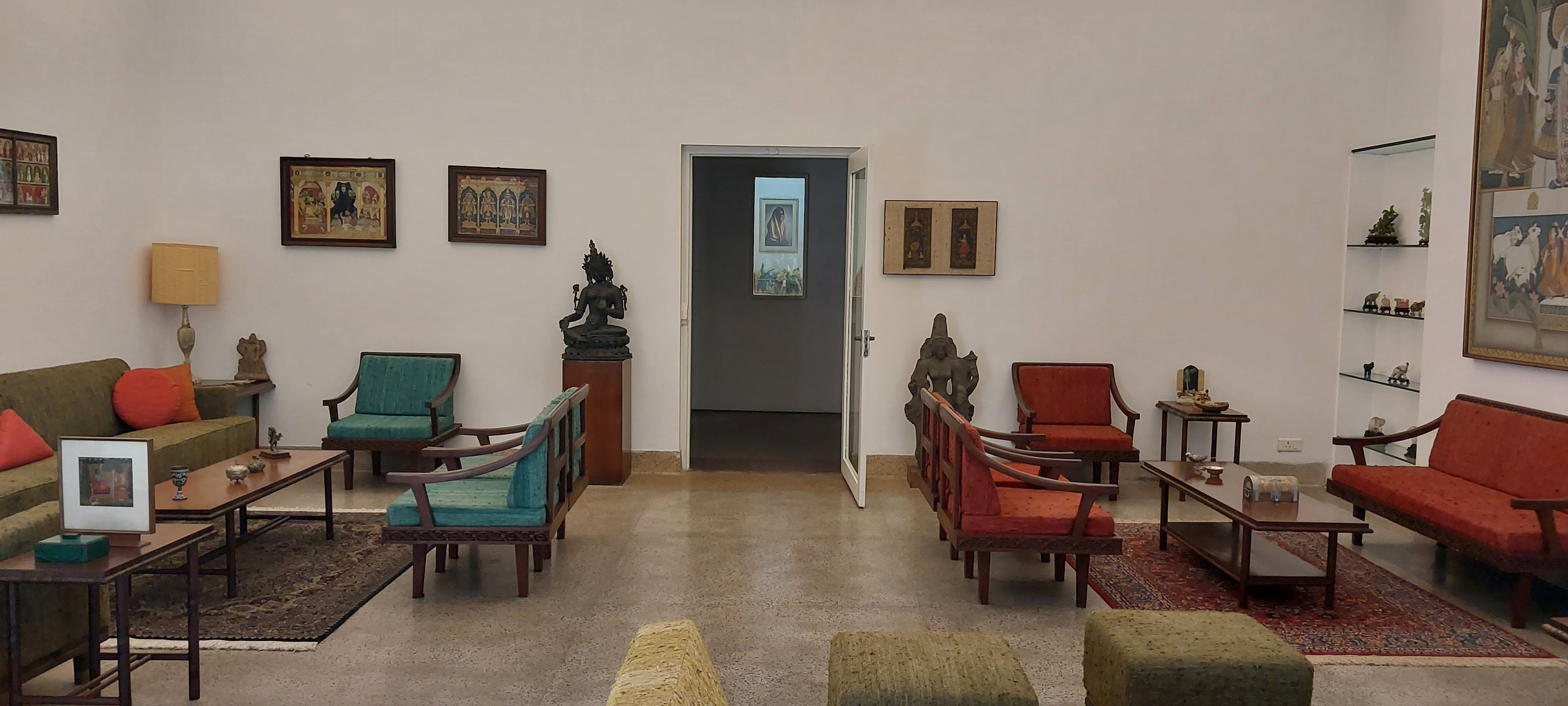
Guest room in Indira Gandhi Memorial Museum

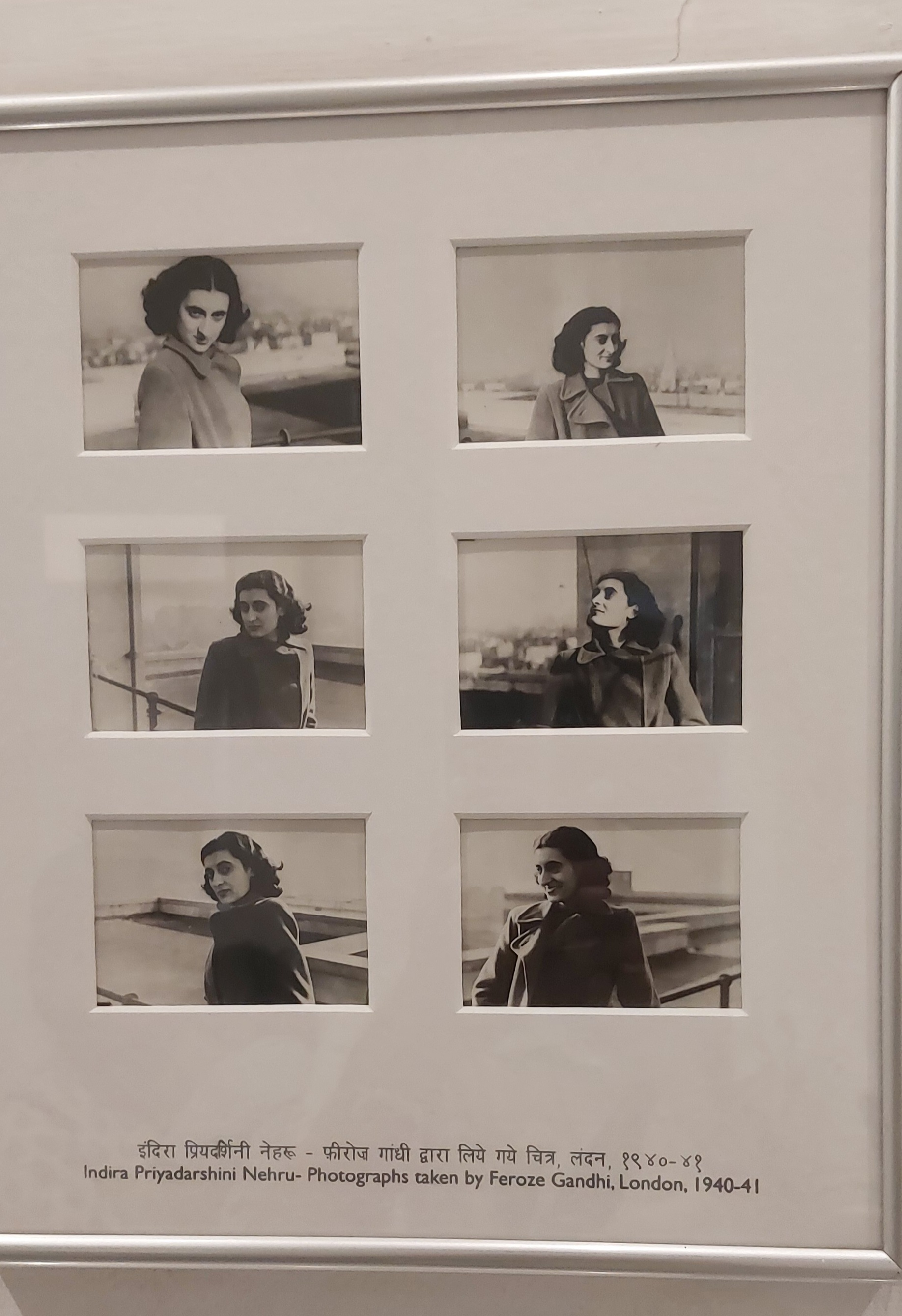
Pictures taken by Feroze Gandhi in London, 1940-41

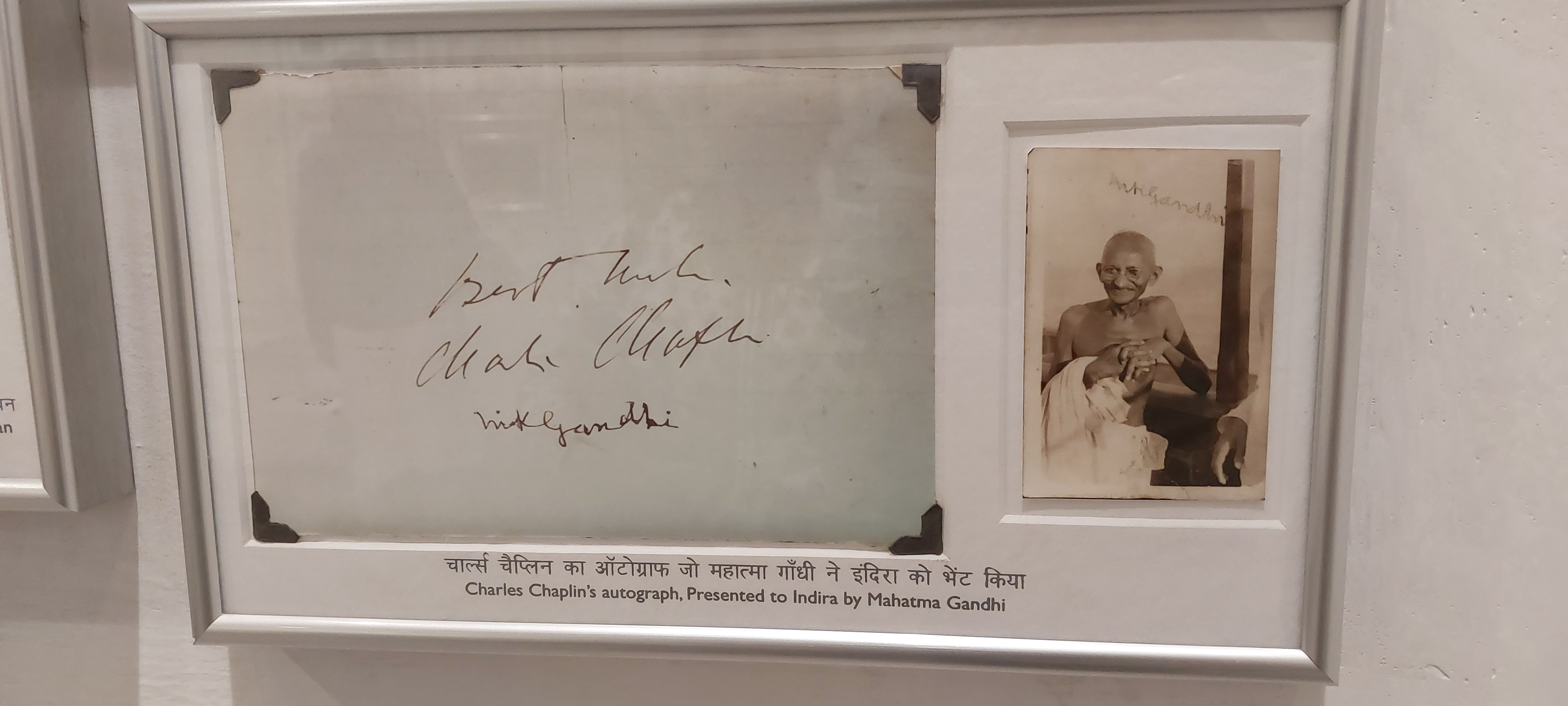
Charles Chaplin autographs presented to Indira by Mahatma Gandhi.

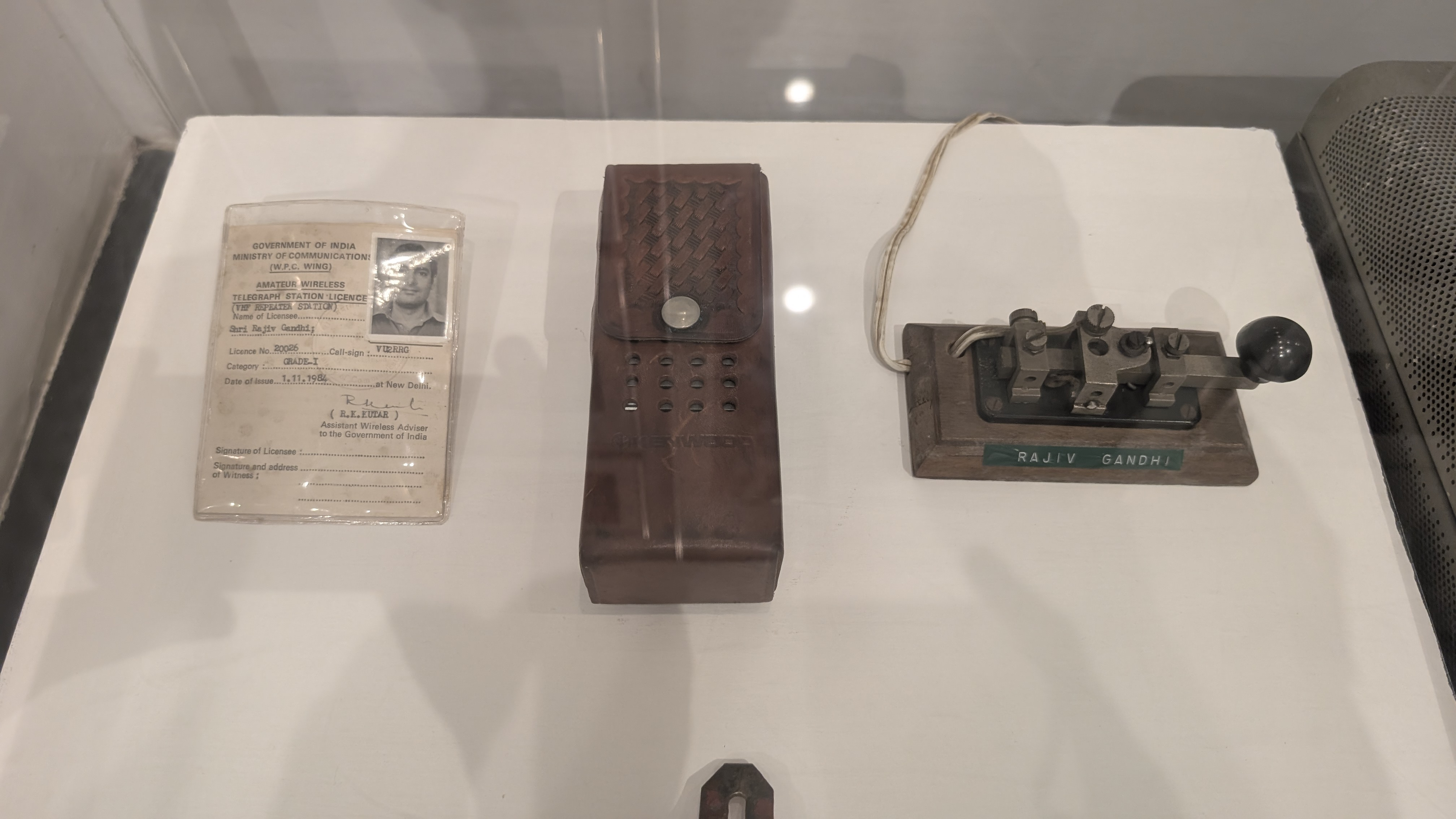
Tools used by Rajiv Gandhi

== See Also ==
- Indira Gandhi
- Rajiv Gandhi
- Sanjay Gandhi
- Rahul Gandhi
- Priyanka Gandhi
- Feroze Gandhi
- Sonia Gandhi
- Indian National Congress
- Jawaharlal Nehru
