= Timeline of women's legal rights (other than voting) in the 20th century =

Timeline of women's legal rights (other than voting) represents formal changes and reforms regarding women's rights. That includes actual law reforms as well as other formal changes, such as reforms through new interpretations of laws by precedents. The right to vote is exempted from the timeline: for that right, see Timeline of women's suffrage. The timeline also excludes ideological changes and events within feminism and antifeminism: for that, see Timeline of feminism.

== Timeline ==
=== 1900s ===
==== 1900 ====
- Belgium: Legal majority for unmarried women.
- Egypt: A school for female teachers is founded in Cairo.
- France: Women allowed to practice law.
- Korea: The post office profession is open to women and thereby open the public work market for women.
- Tunisia: The first public elementary school for girls was founded.
- Japan: The first Women's University.
- Baden, Germany: Universities open to women.
- Sri Lanka: Secondary education open to females.
- Sweden: Maternity leave for female industrial workers.

==== 1901 ====
- Bulgaria: Universities opened to women.
- China: Girls were included in the education system.
- Cuba: Universities opened to women.
- Denmark: Maternity leave for all women.
- Sweden: Women are given four weeks maternity leave.

==== 1902 ====
- Australia: A section in 1902 and 1922 Acts stated that every female officer was deemed to have retired from the Commonwealth Public Service of Australia upon her marriage.
- Norway: In 1902, new legislation allowed for abortion in cases where the mother's life was in danger or the child would be stillborn.
- El Salvador: Married women granted separate economy.
- El Salvador: Legal majority for married women.
- China: In 1902, the Empress Dowager Cixi issued an anti-foot binding edict, but it was soon rescinded.

==== 1903 ====
- On 3 March 1903, Bertha Cave applied to become the first female member of the Gray's Inn, as it was necessary to be a member of one of the Inns of Court in order to be called to the bar. She was mistakenly accepted which was soon changed and she was rejected on the basis of her gender. Cave appealed and in December of the same year, the case was heard, in proceedings that lasted 10 minutes, in the House of Lords. It was argued that women "were under a disability by reason of their sex". Again, she was unsuccessful.
- Sweden: Public medical offices open to women.
- Victoria, Australia: In 1903 the Women’s Disabilities Removal Act 1903, also called the "Flos Greig Enabling Act", was passed to allow women to practice law in Victoria.

==== 1904 ====
- Nicaragua: Married women granted separate economy.
- Nicaragua: Legal majority for married women.
- Württemberg, Germany: Universities open to women.
- Egypt: Article 291 of the Egypt Penal Code, adopted in 1904 and inspired by a French provision, allowed any man who committed sexual assault against a woman to avoid penalty if he entered into marriage with the victim; it was eventually repealed in 1999.

==== 1905 ====
- Argentina: University preparatory secondary education open to females.
- Iceland: Educational institutions open to women.
- Russia: Universities open to women.
- Serbia: Female university students are fully integrated into the university system.

==== 1906 ====
- Finland: Women gain the right to stand for election.
- Honduras: Married women granted separate economy.
- Honduras: Legal majority for married women.
- Korea: The profession of nurse is allowed for women.
- Saxony, Germany: Universities open to women.

==== 1907 ====
- France: Married women given control of their income.
- France: Women allowed guardianship of children.
- United Kingdom: Matrimonial Causes Act 1907
- Iran: Compulsory primary education for females.
- Iran: The first Iranian school for girls is established by Tuba Azmudeh, followed by others in the following years.
- Japan: Tohoku University, the first (private) coeducational university.
- Japan: The punishments for abortion grew more severe in 1907 when the penal code revised: women could be incarcerated for up to a year for having an abortion; practitioners could be jailed for up to seven. The Criminal Abortion Law of 1907 is still technically in effect today, but other legislation has overridden its effects.
- Norway: Women gain the right to stand for election.
- Sudan: The first school open to Muslim girls.
- United States: Section 3 of the Expatriation Act of 1907 provided for loss of citizenship by American women who married aliens. Section 4 provided for retention of American citizenship by formerly alien women who had acquired citizenship by marriage to an American after the termination of their marriages. Women residing in the US would retain their American citizenship automatically if they did not explicitly renounce; women residing abroad would have the option to retain American citizenship by registration with a US.consul. The aim of these provisions was to prevent cases of multiple nationality among women.
- England and Wales: The Qualification of Women (County and Borough Councils) Act 1907 (7 Edw. 7. c. 33) is an act of Parliament that clarified the right of certain women ratepayers to be elected to Borough and County Councils in England and Wales. It followed years of uncertainty and confusion, which included challenges in the courts when women first tried to stand for the London County Council. Women had been elected to separate boards dealing with the Poor Law and the Elementary Education Act 1870 and were entitled to serve on the new urban and rural district councils from 1894. Women had lost their influence on education boards when the free-standing boards were absorbed into newly established councils. Women had also lost places when towns grew and obtained Borough status. The 1907 act which was seen as a victory for the Women's Local Government Society gave widows and unmarried women the right to stand anywhere in local government.

==== 1908 ====
- Belgium: Women may act as legal witnesses in court.
- Denmark: Juridical professions of lower rank open to women.
- Denmark: Unmarried women are made legal guardian of their children.
- Korea: Secondary education for females through the foundation of the Capital School for Girl's Higher Education.
- Ottoman Empire: The Young Turks introduce several reform in favor of gender equality: the professions of doctor, lawyer, and civil servant as well as public places such as restaurants, theatres and lecture halls open to both genders.
- Peru: Universities open to women.
- Prussia, Alsace-Lorraine and Hesse, Germany: Universities open to women.
- Sweden: First women are employed in the Swedish Police Authority.
- United States: Muller v. Oregon, 208 U.S. 412 (1908), was a landmark decision in United States Supreme Court history, as it was used to justify both sex discrimination and usage of labor laws during the time period. The case upheld Oregon state restrictions on the working hours of women as justified by the special state interest in protecting women's health. The ruling had important implications for protective labor legislation.
- United States, New York City: The Sullivan Ordinance was a municipal law passed on January 21, 1908, in New York City by the board of aldermen, barring the management of a public place from allowing women to smoke within their venue. The mayor at the time, George B. McClellan Jr., vetoed the ordinance in February.

==== 1909 ====
- France: Married women are given the legal right to be consulted by husbands before the husband disposes of family property, and to press charges against the economic mismanagement of the husband.
- Sweden: Women granted eligibility to municipal councils.
- Sweden: The phrase "Swedish man" are removed from the application forms to public offices and women are thereby approved as applicants to most public professions and posts as civil servants.
- Mecklenburg, Germany: Universities open to women.

=== 1910s ===
1910

- Spain: Universities fully open to women.
- United States: The White-Slave Traffic Act, or the Mann Act, is a United States federal law, passed June 25, 1910 (ch. 395, 36 Stat. 825; codified as amended at 18 U.S.C. §§ 2421–2424). It is named after Congressman James Robert Mann of Illinois, and in its original form made it a felony to engage in interstate or foreign commerce transport of "any woman or girl for the purpose of prostitution or debauchery, or for any other immoral purpose". In practice, its ambiguous language about "immorality" has resulted in its being used to criminalize even consensual sexual behavior between adults. It was amended by Congress in 1978 and again in 1986.

1911

- Netherlands: Abortion was deemed illegal under the Penal Code of 1886. Convictions were all but precluded, however, by a requirement that the prosecution prove that the fetus had been alive until the abortion. The Morality Acts of 1911 closed this loophole, and strictly barred all abortions, except those performed to save the life of the pregnant woman.
- Luxembourg: A new educational law gives women access to higher education, and two secondary education schools open to females.
- Portugal: Civil offices open to women.
- Portugal: Legal majority for married women (rescinded in 1933).
- Taiwan: In Taiwan from 1911 to 1915 foot binding was gradually made illegal.
- Canada: In 1911 in Sault Ste. Marie, Angelina Napolitano, a 28-year-old, pregnant immigrant, killed her abusive husband Pietro with an axe after he tried to force her into prostitution. She confessed and was sentenced to hang after a brief trial, but during the delay before the sentence was carried out (a delay necessary to allow her to give birth to her child), a public campaign for her release began. Her supporters argued that the judge in the case had been wrong to throw out evidence of her long-standing abuse at Pietro's hands (including an incident five months before when he stabbed her nine times with a pocket knife). The federal cabinet eventually commuted her sentence to life imprisonment. She was the first woman in Canada to use the battered woman defense on a murder charge.
- New Zealand: In New Zealand, a widow's pension was introduced in 1911 to help families with no other way of supporting themselves.

1912

- France: Women allowed to bring paternity suits.
- Norway: Women are given limited access to public offices.
- Republic of China: In 1912, the new Republic of China government banned foot binding.
- South Africa: In the South African case, Incorporated Law Society v. Wookey, 1912 AD 623, the Appellate Division found that the word "persons" used in the statute concerning admission of attorneys to the bar included only men, and thus Madeline Wookey could not be a lawyer. This case came about because although a law firm was willing to enroll Wookey as an articled clerk, the Cape Law Society refused to register her articles. Wookey then applied to the Cape Supreme Court, which ordered the Cape Law Society to register her. The Cape Law Society then appealed this to the Appellate Division, claiming that Wookey could not be admitted as a lawyer because she was female.
- United States: Starting January 1, 1912, the Massachusetts government started to enforce a law that allowed women to work a maximum of 54 hours, rather than 56 hours. Ten days later, the women workers found out that pay had been reduced along with the cut in hours. There was a strike about it in Lawrence, Massachusetts, and mill owners soon decided to settle the strike, giving workers in Lawrence and throughout New England raises of up to 20 percent.

1913

- Japan: Public universities open to women.
- Tunisia: A marry-your-rapist law was enacted in Tunisia in 1913 and repealed in 2017.

1914

- Russia: Married women allowed their own internal passport.
- United Kingdom: In 1913, the United Kingdom’s Law Society refused to allow women to take legal exams; this was challenged in the Court of Appeal in the case of Bebb v The Law Society (1914), where the Law Society's stance was upheld.

1915

- Ottoman Empire: Women are permitted to unveil during office hours.
- United States: Section 3 of the Expatriation Act of 1907 provided for loss of citizenship by American women who married aliens. The Supreme Court first considered the Expatriation Act of 1907 in the 1915 case MacKenzie v. Hare. The plaintiff, a suffragist named Ethel MacKenzie, was living in California, which since 1911 had extended the franchise to women. However, she had been denied voter registration by the respondent in his capacity as a Commissioner of the San Francisco Board of Election on the grounds of her marriage to a Scottish man. MacKenzie contended that the Expatriation Act of 1907 "if intended to apply to her, is beyond the authority of Congress", as neither the Fourteenth Amendment nor any other part of the Constitution gave Congress the power to "denationalize a citizen without his concurrence". However, Justice Joseph McKenna, writing the majority opinion, stated that while "[i]t may be conceded that a change of citizenship cannot be arbitrarily imposed, that is, imposed without the concurrence of the citizen", but "[t]he law in controversy does not have that feature. It deals with a condition voluntarily entered into, with notice of the consequences." Justice James Clark McReynolds, in a concurring opinion, stated that the case should be dismissed for lack of jurisdiction.

1916

- Calcutta, India: A bench of five male judges of the Calcutta High Court ruled, in the case of In Re Regina Guha, that although India’s Legal Practitioners Act 1879 used the term 'person' in regard to enrollment, this term did not include women. They accordingly denied Regina Guha the right to enroll as a lawyer.

1917

- Cuba: Married women granted separate economy.
- Cuba: Legal majority for married women.
- Greece: The first public secondary educational school for girls open.
- Netherlands: Women gain the right to stand for election.
- Mexico: Legal majority for married women.
- Uruguay: University education opened to women.
- Russian Empire: Abortion was a serious crime until 1917. Through articles 1462 and 1463 of the Russian Penal Code individuals "guilty of the crime could be deprived of civil rights and exiled or sentenced to hard labor."

1918

- New South Wales, Australia: The Women's Legal Status Act 1918 formally legalizes all professions for females.
- Northern Territory, Australia: Under the Aboriginals Ordinance 1918, the Chief Protector of Aborigines was given total control of all Indigenous women regardless of their age, unless married to a man who was "substantially of European origin", and his approval was required for any marriage of an Indigenous woman to a non-Indigenous man.
- Czechoslovakia: Females are given the same rights as males in the new constitution and divorce is legalized for both sexes.
- Iran: Public schools for girls are opened in order to enforce the law of compulsory education for girls in practice.
- Soviet Russia: The first Soviet Constitution explicitly declares the equal rights of men and women.
- Thailand: Universities opened to women.
- United Kingdom: The Parliament (Qualification of Women) Act 1918 gave women over 21 the right to stand for election as an MP.
- United States: Margaret Sanger was charged under the New York law against disseminating contraceptive information. On appeal, her conviction was reversed on the grounds that contraceptive devices could legally be promoted for the cure and prevention of disease.

1919

- Puerto Rico: In 1919, Luisa Capetillo challenged mainstream society by becoming the first woman in Puerto Rico to wear trousers in public. Capetillo was sent to jail for what was then considered to be a crime, but, the judge later dropped the charges against her.
- Italy: Married women granted separate economy.
- Italy: Public offices on lower levels are opened to women.
- United Kingdom: The Sex Disqualification (Removal) Act 1919.
- International: The Conventions concerning Employment of Women during the Night are conventions drafted by the International Labour Organization (ILO) which prohibit women from performing industrial work during the night. The first convention was adopted in 1919 (as C04, shortened Night Work (Women) Convention, 1919) and revised versions were adopted in 1934 (C41, Night Work (Women) Convention (Revised), 1934) and 1948 (C89, Night Work (Women) Convention (Revised), 1948). A protocol (P89, Protocol to the Night Work (Women) Convention (Revised), 1948) to the convention was adopted in 1990 allowing for easing of the restriction under conditions. As of April 2011 the conventions had 27, 15, 46 (undenounced) ratifications respectively. The protocol was ratified 5 and denounced by 2.
- International: Maternity Protection Convention, 1919 is an International Labour Organization Convention. It was established in 1919: "Having decided upon the adoption of certain proposals with regard to "women's employment, before and after childbirth, including the question of maternity benefit",...The principles contained in the convention were subsequently revised and included in ILO Convention C103, Maternity Protection Convention (Revised), 1952 and the Maternity Protection Convention, 2000.

=== 1920s ===
1920

- China: The first female students are accepted in the Peking University, soon followed by universities all over China.
- Canada: The Dominion Elections Act allowed women to run for the Parliament of Canada. However, women from minorities, for example Aboriginals and Asians, were not granted these rights.
- Haiti: The apothecary profession opened to women.
- Korea: The profession of telephone operator, as well as several other professions, such as store clerks, were opened to women.
- Nepal: Sati is banned.
- Portugal: Secondary school opened to women.
- Sweden: Legal majority for married women and equal marriage rights.
- United States: The Nineteenth Amendment (Amendment XIX) to the United States Constitution prohibits the states and the federal government from denying the right to vote to citizens of the United States on the basis of sex. It was adopted on August 18, 1920.
- The Russian Soviet Federative Socialist Republic: The Soviet government was the first government in Europe to legalize abortion. In October 1920 the Bolsheviks made abortion legal within the Russian Soviet Federative Socialist Republic with their "Decree on Women's Healthcare". After the RSFSR the law was introduced in Ukraine (5 July 1921) and then the remainder of the Soviet Union.
- France: A law was enacted that forbade all forms of contraception, and also information about contraception.
- United Kingdom: The Employment of Women, Young Persons, and Children Act 1920.

1921

- Argentina: Prior to 2020, a 1921 law regulated access to and penalties for abortions in Argentina. Any woman that intentionally caused her own abortion or consented to another person performing one on her, was faced with one to four years of prison. In addition, any participant in the procedure could face up to fifteen years of prison, depending on the consent given by the woman, her eventual death, and the intent of the participant. The same penalty applied to doctors, surgeons, midwives, and pharmacists that induced or cooperated in the induction of an abortion, with the addition of a special license withdrawal for two times the length of their sentence. However, abortion could be performed legally by a certified doctor if:
1. It had been made to avoid a threat to the life or health of the woman, and this danger could not be avoided by other means;
2. The pregnancy was a result of rape, or an indecent assault against a feeble-minded or demented woman.
- Belgium: Women gain the right to stand for election.
- Belgium: The position of mayor, several lower public offices, such as financial adviser, opened to women at the local level.
- Denmark: Women are given access to all official professions and positions in society, with some excpetions.
- Monaco: The 1921 Women's Olympiad was held, first international women's sports event.
- Poland: Article 96 of the Polish constitution of 1921 provided that all citizens were equal under law, however, it did not apply to married women. On 1 July 1921 the Act on the Change of Certain Provisions of the Civil Law Pertaining to Women's Rights was enacted by the Sejm, to address the most obvious inequalities for women who were married. The provisions of the Act allowed women to control their own property (except their dowry), to act as witnesses to legal documents, to act as custodian of her children if her husband was incapacitated, and to live separately from her spouse. The law also removed the requirements that a woman had to obey her husband and abolished requirements for a wife to obtain her husband's permission to engage in legal actions.
- Sweden: Women gained nationality in their own right equally with men, when the law making husbands guardians over their wives was abolished. However, men retained sole guardianship over children.
- Thailand: Compulsory elementary education for both girls and boys.
- United States: The Promotion of the Welfare and Hygiene of Maternity and Infancy Act, more commonly known as the Sheppard–Towner Act, was a 1921 U.S. Act of Congress that provided federal funding for maternity and child care. It was sponsored by Senator Morris Sheppard (D) of Texas and Representative Horace Mann Towner (R) of Iowa, and signed by President Warren G. Harding on November 23, 1921. This showed the political and economic power of women's issues since the bill was passed due to pressure from the newly formed Women's Joint Congressional Committee. Before its passage, most of the expansion in public health programs occurred at the state and local levels. Many factors helped its passage including the environment of the Progressive Era. Massachusetts, Connecticut and Illinois never participated in the program. Participation in the program varied depending on states. The Act was due for renewal in 1926, but was met with increased opposition. Hence, Congress allowed the act's funding to lapse in 1929 after successful opposition by the American Medical Association, which saw the act as a socialist threat to its professional autonomy. This opposition was in spite of the fact that the Pediatric Section of the AMA House of Delegates had endorsed the renewal of the act. The rebuking of the Pediatric Section by the full House of Delegates led to the members of the Pediatric Section establishing the American Academy of Pediatrics. The Act was held unconstitutional by the Supreme Court in 1922 but the Act continued to be in force until 1929.
- Ukraine: Abortion was legalized in Ukraine (on 5 July 1921).
- Sweden: The reformed law of 1864 abolished the death penalty for abortion and replaced it with between two and six years of penal labour for both the patient who received an abortion, as well as for the abortion provider. A reform in 1921 replaced the penal labour with a shorter prison term without penal labour for the patient, but kept the original penalty for the abortion provider .

1922

- Belgium: The profession of lawyer was opened to women.
- Iraq: The first woman university student in Iraq.
- Japan: Women are allowed to be present and political meetings and form political organizations.
- Peru: Women are allowed to serve in public welfare boards.
- Syria: Muslim women appear unveiled for the first time in public.
- United States: The Cable Act of 1922 (ch. 411, 42 Stat. 1021, "Married Women's Independent Nationality Act") was a United States federal law that reversed former immigration laws regarding marriage. (It is also known as the Married Women's Citizenship Act or the Women's Citizenship Act). Previously, a woman lost her United States citizenship if she married a foreign man, since she assumed the citizenship of her husband, a law that did not apply to United States citizen men who married foreign women. The law repealed sections 3 and 4 of the Expatriation Act of 1907. However, the Cable Act of 1922 guaranteed independent female citizenship only to women who were married to an "alien eligible to naturalization." At the time of the law's passage, Asian aliens were not considered to be racially eligible for US citizenship. As such, the Cable Act only partially reversed previous policies and allowed women to retain their United States citizenship after marrying a foreigner who was not Asian. Thus, even after the Cable Act become effective, any woman who married an Asian alien lost her United States citizenship, just as under the previous law. The Cable Act also had other limitations: a woman could keep her United States citizenship after marrying a non-Asian alien if she stayed within the United States. However, if she married a foreigner and lived on foreign soil for two years, she could still lose her right to United States nationality.
- Japan: The Diet of Japan amended Article 5 in the 1900 Police Law, allowing women to attend political gatherings while continuing to forbid them from joining political parties and voting.
- Soviet Union: The Soviet Union made marital rape illegal.

1923

- India: The enactment of the Legal Practitioners (Women) Act allowed women to enroll as lawyers and practice law in India.
- Egypt: Veiling is discarded: unveiling is supported by a fatwa in 1937.
- Egypt: Compulsory education for both sexes.
- Sweden: The Law of Access formally grants women the right to all professions and positions in society, except for certain priest- and military positions.
- Japan: Doctors were granted legal permission to perform emergency abortions to save the mother's life; abortions performed under different, less life-threatening circumstances were still prosecuted.
- Belgium: Abortion in Belgium was first prohibited without exception by Articles 348 to 353 of the Belgian Criminal Code of 1867. Abortion was then defined as one of the crimes "against the order of families and against public morality". However, very few legal proceedings against illegal abortions took place until 1923, when a bill originally submitted by Henry Carton de Wiart in 1913 was passed by the Belgian parliament that formally coded in legal penalties for incitement to abortion as well as advertising and promotion of contraception.

1924

- Argentina: Women are secured the right to maternity leave and daycare and employers are banned from firing women because of pregnancy.
- Denmark: The first ever female minister in Western Europe is appointed, when Nina Bang is appointed Minister of Education by Thorvald Stauning.
- Peru: Legislation was passed which stated that rapists were legally able to be exempt from sexual assault charges through a loophole. In cases of rape and to serve as a punishment for the perpetrator, the victim was required to enter into a marriage with their rapist. In 1991, this law was modified to absolve co-conspirators in a gang rape case if one of them married the victim. In 1997, the law was completely repealed.
- Peru: Abortion has been generally illegal in Peru since 1924.

1925

- Chile: Married women granted separate economy.
- Korea: Professional school for women (at Ewha Womans University).
- United Kingdom: Benefits for Widows were first established by the Widows', Orphans' and Old Age Contributory Benefits Act 1925 at a rate of 10 shillings a week for life, to stop on remarriage. It was replaced by Bereavement benefit in April 2001.
- Tasmania, Australia: From 1925 until 2001, Tasmania's Criminal Code prohibited "unlawful abortion" without actually stating what was lawful or not. While it had never actually been prosecuted, it had been held that Victoria's Menhennitt ruling of 1969 and New South Wales' Levine ruling applied in Tasmanian law. In late 2001, the Criminal Code was clarified to state that an abortion must be carried out under a set of criteria resembling those of the South Australian requirements.
- England and Wales: Administration of Estates Act 1925

1926

- Argentina: Married women granted separate economy, legal majority, and the right to employment.
- Lebanon: The University of Beirut opened to women.
- Romania: Married women allowed to manage their own income.
- Turkey: The Civil Code of 1926 secures equal rights to women in inheritance, marriage (thereby abolishing polygamy and harems) and divorce.
- Tonga: The Parent Consent Act 1926 allows rapists to marry their victim (between the age of 14 and 18) if the victim's parents give consent.
- Venezuela: Venezuela approved a law in 1926 banning abortion that was left unmodified up to 2000, when a reform allowed the procedure if the woman's life was in danger. A clause of the Venezuelan Penal Code reduces the sentence "if the author of the abortion commits it to save his or his mother, wife or children's honour". While the punishment for a doctor or any person who performs the procedure is between one and three years, harsher penalties may apply if the pregnant woman dies as a result of the procedure.
- Japan: Women's sumo was banned by the government in 1926.
- Germany: In 1926 a court's decision – similar to the United Kingdom decision R v Bourne – decriminalized abortion in cases of grave danger to the life of the mother.

1927

- Portugal: A law in 1927 (Decreto de Lei 13/470) regulated medication abortion by requiring medical prescription.
- Afghanistan: The monarch introduces compulsory education for the daughters of officials.
- Luxembourg: Women are explicitly approved to function as a witness in court.
- Norway: the 1927 Law on Spouses awarded equal legal weight to the verbal testimony of the housewife in parity with men.
- The Yishuv: A declaration was ratified by the government confirming "equal rights to women in all aspects of life in the yishuv – civil, political, and economic."
- Greece: In 1927, a court case ruled that it was 'not necessary for the court to have knowledge that the fetus was alive before the attempted abortion'. The judge specifically clarified that article 303 of the penal code applied "even when the conception is recent and the fetus had not started giving signs of life yet". Contradictorily, article 106 of the penal code specified that 'a person who undertook an illegal act in order to urgently protect their own or someone else's life' should not be punished.

1928

- Afghanistan: The first women are sent abroad to study (women banned from studying abroad in 1929). Compulsory veiling, polygamy and forced concubinage is abolished (rescinded in 1929).
- Albania: The Civil Code of 1928 bans forced marriages and gives married women the right to divorce and equal inheritance.
- Bahrain: The first public primary school for girls.
- Egypt: The first women students are admitted to Cairo University.
- Mexico: Equal marriage law.
- United Kingdom: Women are given the right to vote.
- Southern Rhodesia: the marital power was abolished in 1928 by the Married Persons' Property Act, which also abolished community of property.

1929

- United Kingdom: The Infant Life (Preservation) Act 1929 is an act of the Parliament of the United Kingdom. It created the offense of child destruction. Child destruction is the crime of killing an unborn but viable foetus; that is, a child "capable of being born alive", before it has "a separate existence".
- Greece: Secondary education for females is made equal to that of males.
- Haiti: The legal profession opened to women.
- Canada: Edwards v Canada (AG)—also known as the Persons Case—is a famous Canadian constitutional case that decided that women were eligible to sit in the Senate of Canada. The case, put forward by the Government of Canada on the lobbying of a group of women known as the Famous Five, began as a reference case in the Supreme Court of Canada, which ruled that women were not "qualified persons" and thus ineligible to sit in the Senate. The case then went to the Judicial Committee of the Imperial Privy Council, at that time the court of last resort for Canada within the British Empire and Commonwealth. The Judicial Committee overturned the Supreme Court's decision. The Persons Case was a landmark case in two respects. First, it established that Canadian women were eligible to be appointed senators. Second, it established what came to be known as the "living tree doctrine", which is a doctrine of constitutional interpretation that says that a constitution is organic and must be read in a broad and liberal manner so as to adapt it to changing times.
- Portugal: A law (Decreto de Lei 17/636) prohibited the sale, without medical prescription, and advertising of any substance that had abortion as its off-label use.

=== 1930s ===
1930

- Japan: In 1930 a statute issued by the Ministry of Home Affairs barred both the sale of birth control and the dissemination of information on the subject.
- Japan: An ordinance issued in 1930 by the Ministry of Home Affairs for the Control of Harmful Contraceptive Appliances banned contraceptive appliances that were considered to cause harm to the individual, such as intrauterine devices. Seven years later in 1937 the government extended this ban to include any written publications on the subject.
- Turkey: Equal right to university education for both men and women.
- Turkey: Women gain the right to stand for local election.
- South Africa: The Women's Enfranchisement Act, 1930, was an act of the Parliament of South Africa which granted white women aged 21 and older the right to run for office.

1931

- United States, Michigan: A 1931 law criminalized abortion in Michigan except when the mother's life was in danger.
- China: The new Civil Code granted equal inheritance rights, the right for women to choose their marriage partner, equal right to divorce and the right for women to control their own property after divorce.
- Spain: Legal majority for married women (rescinded in 1939).
- Spain: Equal right to profession (rescinded in 1939).
- United States: An amendment to the Cable Act allowed female citizens to retain their citizenship even if they married an Asian.
- Mexico: The Mexican Government addressed abortion by making it illegal, except in the cases when the abortion is caused by the negligence of the mother, continuation of the pregnancy endangers the life of the mother, or in pregnancy resulting from rape. This made Mexico the first country in the world to legalize abortion in cases of rape.
- Mexico: Mexico enacted a national marry-your-rapist law, which was repealed in 1991. As of 2017, the laws of three states (Campeche, Baja California and Sonora) provide that marriage to the victim exonerates the perpetrator of the crime of estupro (seduction of minors).
- Denmark: In 1930 the penalty for abortion was reduced to two years in prison, and an exemption was added for pregnancies threatening the life of the mother.

1932

- Colombia: Legal majority for married women.
- Colombia: Married women granted separate economy.
- Romania: Married women granted legal majority.
- Ireland: The marriage bar was introduced in Ireland; it prevented any married woman from working in the public sector. In 1973, the marriage bar was removed in Ireland.
- Poland: Poland became the first country in Europe outside the Soviet Union to legalize abortion in cases of rape and threat to maternal health. Until 1932, abortion was banned in Poland without any exceptions (although an abortion performed in order to save the pregnant woman's life in the absence of any other means to do so, might have been unenforced, as an act of necessity). In that year, the new Penal Code legalised abortion only when there were medical reasons and, for the first time in Europe, when the pregnancy resulted from a criminal act.
- Poland: Poland made marital rape illegal.

1933

- Colombia: Universities opened to women.
- Luxembourg: A ban against firing women teachers after marriage.
- Some states in the Americas: The Convention on the Nationality of Women was adopted in 1933 by the Pan American Union in Montevideo, Uruguay. It was the first international treaty ever adopted concerning women's rights. The Seventh International Conference of American States agreed that "There shall be no distinction based on sex as regards nationality, in their legislation or in their practice". This agreement, which effected only the status of the member states in the Americas, was the precursor to the United Nations own study on the subject of nationality begun in 1948.
- Germany: In May 1933, the Nazis reintroduced earlier laws outlawing the advertisement of abortion procedures and abortifacients to the public.

1934

- Brazil: The constitution of 1934 grants all women equality before the law, maternity leave, access to all public professions.
- Haiti: The physician profession opened to women.
- Iran: In order to prepare for an abolition of the veil and social gender segregation, women teachers and students are encouraged to appear unveiled: this is followed the next year by an order to male politicians to introduce their wives to representational gender mixed social life.
- Turkey: Women gain the right to stand for election.
- Soviet Union: New, stricter laws were passed on performing illegal abortions.

1935

- Iran: Women are admitted to Tehran University. The access of university education to females is, in fact, also a reform regarding women's access to professions, as it open numerous professions to women.
- Luxembourg: The profession of nurse and social worker, though de facto already in existence, are formally legalized and regulated for women.
- Thailand: Polygamy is banned and women are entitled to an equal share of common property after divorce.
- International: Underground Work (Women) Convention, 1935 is an International Labour Organization Convention. It was established in 1935, with the preamble stating:

Having decided upon the adoption of certain proposals with regard to the employment of women on underground work in mines of all kinds,..

- Iceland: Iceland became the first Western country to legalize therapeutic abortion under limited circumstances.
- Nazi Germany: Nazi Germany amended its eugenics law, to promote abortion for women who have hereditary disorders. The law allowed abortion if a woman gave her permission, and if the fetus was not yet viable, and for purposes of so-called racial hygiene.
- Ireland: Contraception in Ireland was made illegal in 1935 under the 1935 Criminal Law (Amendment) Act.
- Ireland: The Irish Nationality and Citizenship Act provided that marriage had no bearing on Irish women's citizenship and that Irish citizenship was separate from British nationality.

1936

- Colombia: The national University opened to women.
- Colombia: 1936 penal legislation authorized therapeutic abortion while banning all other forms of abortion, regardless of whether the abortion was consented to or not.
- Iran: Reza Shah Pahlavi set the mandatory unveiling of women—a highly controversial policy which nonetheless was significant for the desegregation of women. In order to enforce the abolition of gender segregation, male civil servants were ordered to bring their wives to official ceremonies. As well, to enforce the unveiling decree, police were ordered to physically remove the veil off of any woman who wore it in public. Women were beaten, their headscarves and chadors torn off, and their homes forcibly searched. Until Reza Shah's abdication in 1941, many women simply chose not to leave their houses in order to avoid such embarrassing confrontations, and some even committed suicide.
- Peru: Married women granted separate economy.
- United States: In 1936, a federal appeals court ruled in United States v. One Package of Japanese Pessaries that the federal government could not interfere with doctors providing contraception to their patients.
- United States: The Cable Act was repealed.
- Romania: Abortion remained illegal under Romania's 1936 Criminal Code, except if needed to save the pregnant woman's life or if the child risked inheriting a severe genetic disorder. Nevertheless, the punishments for both abortion provider and pregnant women who procured an abortion were extremely lenient, almost symbolical, compared to many other European countries. Articles 482–485 of that code dealt with abortion. The punishment for both the person performing an abortion and the pregnant woman who procured the abortion were 3–6 months if she was unmarried; and 6 months-1 year if she was married. The punishments increased if the woman didn't consent to the abortion, if she was severely injured, or if she died. Medical personnel or pharmacists involved in performing abortions were barred for practicing the profession for 1–3 years. The significance of such legal provisions must be understood in an international context: for instance as late as 1943, in France, abortion provider Marie-Louise Giraud was executed for performing abortions.
- Soviet Union: Joseph Stalin reversed most parts of Lenin's legalization of abortion in the Soviet Union to increase population growth.
- Catalonia: On 25 December 1936, in Catalonia, elective abortion was legalized during the first 12 weeks of pregnancy, with a decree signed by Josep Tarradellas on 9 January 1937 (Diari Oficial de la Generalitat de Catalunya, núm.9).

1937

- Albania: Veiling is banned.
- United Kingdom: Matrimonial Causes Act 1937
- Kuwait: The first public schools open to females.
- Puerto Rico: Women gain the right to stand for election.
- Ireland: The 1937 Constitution and Taoiseach Éamon de Valera's conservative leadership somewhat stripped women of their previously granted rights. As well, though the 1937 Constitution guarantees women the right to vote and to nationality and citizenship on an equal basis with men, it also contains a provision, Article 41.2, which states:

1° [...] the State recognises that by her life within the home, woman gives to the State a support without which the common good cannot be achieved. 2° The State shall, therefore, endeavour to ensure that mothers shall not be obliged by economic necessity to engage in labour to the neglect of their duties in the home.

- Puerto Rico: Abortion effectively became legal in Puerto Rico in 1937 after the territory's legislature repealed existing laws around reproductive care and treatment. These reforms included allowing interstate transportation of information about contraceptives and birth control methods, legalized contraceptive sterilization, and introducing a therapeutic exemption for abortions to protect the life or health of the woman who was pregnant.
- Sweden: In 1937, the statutory provision of the Swedish Act of Succession which in effect had required a spouse of royal birth was changed and the prohibition only extended to a "private Swedish man's daughter" (Swedish: enskild svensk mans dotter).
- Part of Spain: In 1937, over the area loyal to the Republic during the Spanish Civil War under the socialist Spanish Socialist Workers' Party (PSOE) government of Francisco Largo Caballero, the Minister of Health Catalan Federica Montseny (anarchist CNT) legalized abortion. The law was repealed by the victorious Francisco Franco.
- Japan: An ordinance issued in 1930 by the Ministry of Home Affairs for the Control of Harmful Contraceptive Appliances banned contraceptive appliances that were considered to cause harm to the individual, such as intrauterine devices. Seven years later in 1937 the government extended this ban to include any written publications on the subject.

1938

- France: Legal majority for married women.
- Iran: The first women admitted as students at the University of Tehran.
- Sweden: Contraception legalized.
- Britain: Dr. Aleck Bourne aborted the pregnancy of a young girl who had been raped by British soldiers. Bourne was acquitted after turning himself in to authorities, in the case Rex v. Bourne. The legal precedent of allowing abortion in order to avoid mental or physical damage was picked up by other countries in the Commonwealth of Nations.
- Sweden: Abortion in Sweden was first legislated by the Abortion Act of 1938. This stated that an abortion could be legally performed in Sweden upon medical, humanitarian, or eugenical grounds. That is, if the pregnancy constituted a serious threat to the woman's life, if she had been impregnated by rape, or if there was a considerable chance that any serious condition might be inherited by her child, she could request an abortion.
- Spain: Fuero del Trabajo of 1938 was the law which prevented married women from working in workshops or factories in Spain. The goal was to make women free to tend to their husband's needs inside their household.
- Uruguay: Abortion was made illegal in Uruguay in 1938.
- United States, Kentucky: Since the late 1700s or possibly the early 1800s, it was illegal for women in Kentucky to be bartenders and to be served spirits or wine while sitting at a bar. This was suspended at the beginning of Prohibition in the United States, but was brought back in 1938.

1939

- Sweden: Ban against firing a woman for marrying or having children.
- France: The French Penal Code was altered to permit an abortion that would save the pregnant woman's life.
- Denmark: Abortion was first allowed in 1939 by application; if the doctors deemed the pregnancy fell into one of three categories (harmful or fatal to the mother, high risk for birth defects, or a pregnancy borne out of rape), a woman could legally have her pregnancy terminated.

=== 1940s ===
1940s

- Lebanon: Article 522 of the Lebanon Penal Code became a part of the law in the 1940s and stated that rape was a punishable offense, where the attacker could receive up to seven years in prison. However, no criminal prosecution would take place if the perpetrator and their victim got married, and stayed married for a minimum of three years. In 2017, Article 522 of the Lebanon Penal Code, which had been labelled a "rape law" was repealed. But after Article 522 was repealed, it was argued by many that the law still lived on through Articles 505 and 518. Article 505 involves the act of sex with a minor, while Article 518 deals with the seduction of a minor accompanied by the promise of marriage.

1940

- Japan: The National Eugenic Law stopped short of explicitly calling abortion legal by outlining a set of procedures a doctor had to follow in order to perform an abortion; these procedures included getting second opinions and submitting reports, though these could be ignored when it was an emergency. This was a daunting and complicated process that many physicians did not want to deal with, and some sources attribute the fall in abortion rate between 1941 and 1944 from 18,000 to 1,800 to this legislation.

1941

- Iran: Official measures were relaxed in 1941 under Reza Shah's successor, Mohammad Reza Pahlavi, and the wearing of a headscarf or chador was no longer an offence, but was still considered an indicator of backwardness or of membership of the lower class.
- Brazil: It was illegal for women to play soccer in Brazil from 1941 to 1979.

1942

- Russia: Women formally accepted into the military.
- Venezuela: Legal majority for married women.
- Venezuela: Married women granted separate economy.
- Spain: The Labor Regulation Act of 1942 said women in Spain had to sign a voluntary dismissal form within a month of being married that resulted in them losing their job. After that, newly married women had to wait two years before they could re-enter the workforce and only then, if they had permission from their husband.

1943

- Iran: Compulsory primary education for both males and females.
- Spain: A 1943 law changed the age of majority for single women to 21. Despite turning 21, women could not leave the home at that age unless their fathers gave permission; they would have to wait until they were 25. The only exception was if a woman married, or entered a convent.
- Nazi Germany: In Nazi Germany, which included territories of Poland from 1939 to 1945, the law allowing unlimited abortions by Polish women was in force since 9 March 1943. This was the only time in the history of Poland when abortion was legal on request, and in fact, abortion for Poles was often forced by Nazis, especially in German concentration camps such as Waltrop-Holthausen and Ravensbrück.

1944

- Damascus, Syria: To appease the Islamic groups, the government introduced sex segregation on public transportation in Damascus during religious holidays in 1944.
- Soviet Union: The New Family Law of 1944 sanctioned single motherhood as a site of reproduction by providing financial support for single mothers.
- Spain: Under the Labor Contracts Act of 1944 women needed permission from their husband before they were able to sign an employment contract.
- Spain: The 1944 Penal Code allowed for blood revenge for adultery, but only in cases where a husband caught his wife in the sexual act of committing adultery, not when a wife caught her husband. The law also stated under Article 438 that parents could kill their daughters if she was 22 years old or younger, and they caught her having sex with a man. Husbands and parents were still punished under the law for these killings, but the consequences were small and mostly included only a man being forced to leave his home and live at least 25 kilometers away for a few years. There was no punishment if the husband only seriously injured his wife.

1945

- 'British Guiana'-Guyana: Women gain the right to stand for election.
- Canada: The Canadian Citizenship Act provided that marriage had no bearing on Canadian women's nationality, provided that Canadian citizens primary nationality was Canadian (not British) and that women were eligible to become naturalized citizens under the same rules which applied to men.
- United States, Illinois: In People ex rel. Rago v. Lipsky, 63 N.E.2d 642 (Ill. 1945), the Appellate Court of Illinois, First District did not allow a married woman to stay registered to vote under her birth name, due to "the long-established custom, policy and rule of the common law among English-speaking peoples whereby a woman's name is changed by marriage and her husband's surname becomes as a matter of law her surname."
- United States, Michigan: A 1945 Michigan law prohibited women from being licensed as a bartender in all cities having a population of 50,000 or more unless their father or husband owned the establishment.

1946

- Sweden: Abortion law was changed in 1946 to legalize abortion on socio-medical grounds.
- Burma: Women gain the right to stand for election.
- Uruguay: Legal majority for married women.
- Uruguay: Married women granted separate economy.
- Sudan: Sudan was the first country to outlaw FGM in 1946, under the British. However, currently there is no national law forbidding FGM there.
- United States, North Carolina: A state constitutional amendment passed in North Carolina making women eligible to serve on a jury.
- Norway: Allowances for mothers at home were created.
- United Kingdom: The Widowed Mother's Allowance was part of the United Kingdom system of Social Security benefits. It was established under the National Insurance Act 1946 and abolished and replaced by Widowed Parent's Allowance in 2001.

1947

- Sweden: Equal salary for both sexes.
- India: The Madras Devadasis (Prevention of Dedication) Act (also called the Tamil Nadu Devadasis (Prevention of Dedication) Act or the Madras Devadasi Act) is a law that was enacted on 9 October 1947 just after India became independent from British rule. The law was passed in the Madras Presidency and gave devadasis the legal right to marry and made it illegal to dedicate girls to Hindu temples.
- New Jersey, United States: Wherever in this Constitution the term "person", "persons", "people" or any personal pronoun is used, the same shall be taken to include both sexes. - New Jersey Constitution, Article X, paragraph 4 (1947).
- Spain: Spain allowed the sons of female dynasts but not women themselves to inherit the throne of Spain in 1947–1978.

1948

- Japan: Japan legalized abortion under special circumstances. The Eugenic Protection Law of 1948 made Japan one of the first countries to legalize induced abortion. This law was revised as the Maternal Body Protection Law in 1996.
- Sweden: Maternity pay.
- United Kingdom: Married British women gained independent nationality, regardless of the citizenship of their spouses.
- United States: Goesaert v. Cleary, 335 U.S. 464 (1948), was a United States Supreme Court case in which the Court upheld a 1945 Michigan law which prohibited women from being licensed as a bartender in all cities having a population of 50,000 or more unless their father or husband owned the establishment. However, Michigan overturned the law in 1955, and the Supreme Court decision was subsequently overruled by Craig v. Boren (1976).
- United States: The Women's Armed Services Integration Act (Pub.L. 80–625, 62 Stat. 356, enacted June 12, 1948) is a United States law that enabled women to serve as permanent, regular members of the armed forces in the Army, Navy, Marine Corps, and the recently formed Air Force. However, Section 502 of the act limited service of women by excluding them from aircraft and vessels of the Navy that might engage in combat.

1949

- Japan: In 1949, a revision to Japan's 1948 law regarding abortion passed; this revision provided abortion in the case of extreme physical or economic distress to the mother.
- Japan: The Pharmaceutical Law, passed in 1949, increased the list of contraceptives, excluding the pill, that could be produced, advertised, and sold in Japan.
- Ecuador: Legal majority for married women.
- Syria: Syria enacted a marry-your-rapist law.
- India: The minimum legal age for marriage was increased to 15 for girls in 1949.

Early 1950s

- China: In the early 1950s, the Chinese government made abortion illegal other than when 1) the mother had a preexisting condition, such as tuberculosis or pernicious anemia, that would cause the pregnancy to be a threat to the mother's life; 2) when traditional Chinese medicine could not settle an overactive fetus and spontaneous abortion was expected; and 3) when the mother had already undergone two or more Caesarean sections. Punishments were written into the law for those who received or performed illegal abortions. In 1954 and 1956, the law was extended to include other pre-existing illnesses and disabilities, such as hypertension and epilepsy, as well as allowed women working in certain types of occupations to qualify. Women who had already had four children and became pregnant four months after giving birth to their last child also qualified for an abortion. These laws were relaxed in the late 1950s and early 1960s with the intent of reducing the number of deaths and lifelong injuries women sustained due to illegal abortions as well as serving as a form of population control when used in conjunction with birth control.

=== 1950s ===
1950

- China: Statute grants women equal right to property, to seek divorce and to inheritance.
- Czechoslovakia: Czechoslovakia made marital rape illegal.
- Norway: Women who married foreigners could decide for themselves whether to keep Norwegian citizenship or not.
- El Salvador: 14 September, women in El Salvador gained citizenship in their own right after Rosa Amelia Guzmán persuaded legislators to change the constitution.
- Finland: In Finland, abortion was illegal until 1950, when the Parliament of Finland legalized abortions to preserve the physical or mental health of the woman, if the woman was under 16, if the fetus might be deformed, or the woman had been raped.
- Yugoslavia: During the regime of the SFR Yugoslavia the traditional face veil (Bosnian: Zar) was officially banned in 1950.

1951

- Bahrain: First secondary education school open to females.

1952

- Yugoslavia, of which SR Croatia was a part: Legalized abortion in 1952 based on a medical, eugenic or a legal indication.
- Japan: A stipulation to abortion law in Japan was added in 1952 requiring that the mother meet an economic threshold of poor living conditions to obtain an abortion.

1953

- Afghanistan: The age of marriage for women was raised to sixteen, dowries are made the property of the wife, women are appointed judges in family courts and numerous professions, such as flight attendants, police officers, telephone operators and receptionists, are opened to women.
- Mexico: Women gain the right to stand for election.
- South Africa: The Matrimonial Affairs Act in 1953, restricts but did not abolish the marital power.
- South Korea: The government of South Korea criminalized abortion in the 1953 Criminal Code in all circumstances.
- International: The Convention concerning Equal Remuneration for Men and Women Workers for Work of Equal Value, or Equal Remuneration Convention, which went into force in 1953, is the 100th International Labour Organization Convention and the principal one aimed at equal remuneration for work of equal value for men and women. States parties may accomplish this through legislation, introduction of a system for wage determination and/or collective bargaining agreements. It is one of eight ILO fundamental conventions.
- International: The Convention on the Political Rights of Women was approved by the United Nations General Assembly during the 409th plenary meeting, on 20 December 1952, and adopted on 31 March 1953. The Convention's purpose is to codify a basic international standard for women's political rights.
- Denmark: The Act of Succession of 27 March 1953 made it possible for a woman to inherit the throne if she has no older or younger brothers, a system known as male-preference cognatic preference primogeniture.
- Libya: Under Article 424, the perpetrator of rape, as well as any accomplice, can avoid imprisonment for rape as stipulated in Article 407 if he makes a contract of marriage with his victim.
- Hungary: Abortion has been legally accepted in Hungary starting in 1953.

1955

- Qatar: First public school for girls.
- India: The Hindu Marriage Act, 1955 was passed. The main purpose of the act was to amend and codify the law relating to marriage among Hindus and others. Besides amending and codifying Sastrik Law, it introduced separation and divorce, which did not exist in Sastrik Law. This enactment brought uniformity of law for all sections of Hindus. In India there are religion-specific civil codes that separately govern adherents of certain other religions.
- India: The Hindu Succession Act, 1956 is an Act of the Parliament of India enacted to amend and codify the law relating to intestate or unwilled succession, among Hindus, Buddhists, Jains, and Sikhs. The Act lays down a uniform and comprehensive system of inheritance and succession into one Act. The Hindu woman's limited estate is abolished by the Act. Any property possessed by a Hindu female is to be held by her absolute property and she is given full power to deal with it and dispose it of by will as she likes. Parts of this Act were amended in 2005 by the Hindu Succession (Amendment) Act, 2005. Under the Hindu Succession Act, 1956, females are granted ownership of all property acquired either before or after the signing of the Act, abolishing their "limited owner" status. However, it was not until the 2005 Amendment that daughters were allowed equal receipt of property as with sons.
- Soviet Union: After Stalin's death in 1953, the Soviet government revoked the 1936 Abortion law and issued a new law on abortion.
- United States, Michigan: Goesaert v. Cleary, 335 U.S. 464 (1948), was a United States Supreme Court case in which the Court upheld a 1945 Michigan law which prohibited women from being licensed as a bartender in all cities having a population of 50,000 or more unless their father or husband owned the establishment. However, Michigan overturned the law in 1955, and the Supreme Court decision was subsequently overruled by Craig v. Boren (1976).
- Texas, United States: It became legal for women to serve on juries in Texas.

1956

- Malaysia: The 1956 Medicines Advertisement and Sale Act prohibited the publication of abortion advertisements.
- Bulgaria: Abortions were legalized by a decree of the Ministry of Public Health on 27 April 1956, providing for abortions for all pregnancies within the first twelve weeks on any grounds, and only on therapeutic grounds thereafter.
- El Salvador: El Salvador's 1956 Penal Code contained no explicit exception to its prohibition of abortion, although, under accepted principles of criminal law, one could be justified if necessary to preserve the life of the pregnant woman.
- Poland: In 1956, the Sejm legalized abortion in cases where the woman was experiencing "difficult living conditions". The interpretation of the change in the law varied from a restrictive interpretation in the late 1950s, to one in which abortion was allowed on request in the 1960s and 1970s. It was not uncommon that women from countries where abortions were restricted, such as Sweden, travelled to Poland to carry out abortions which were accessible and affordable there. The procedural requirements needed for obtaining a legal abortion were changed several times over the years, in 1956, 1959, 1969, 1981 and 1990.

1957

- Convention on the Nationality of Married Women, an UN convention that entered force in 1958 and was ratified by 74 countries, protects the citizenships of women who married citizens of other countries (previously such a marriage often resulted in the loss of the woman's original citizenship).
- Romania: Abortion was legal on-demand in Romania from 1957 to 1966.
- Czechoslovakia: In 1957, abortions were legalized in Czechoslovakia, although with restrictions that depended on the current policy of the government.
- Netherlands: In the Netherlands, the marriage bar was removed in 1957.

1958

- United Kingdom: Women entered the House of Lords for the first time thanks to the Life Peerages Act 1958.
- Sweden: Women allowed to become priests.
- Netherlands: In the Netherlands marital power was abolished in 1958.
- Bahrain: Article 353 of the Bahrain Penal Code, dating from 1958, has undergone several amendments since its adoption. It states that if a perpetrator marries the victim before the final sentencing is pronounced, the charges will be dropped and criminal proceedings will be suspended.
- Spain: Laws on guardianship in Spain were not reformed until 24 April 1958. One reform meant that women could retain custody of their children if they were widowed and remarried, but only if the deceased husband specified this in his will. Another reform of the 1958 law meant that for the first time a husband could not sell or alienate marital property without his wife's consent.

1959

- Afghanistan: Veiling is not banned but the compulsory veiling is abolished and women in official positions, as well as the wives and daughters of male officials, are asked to discard the veil in public.
- Iraq: The new personal status law provide equal inheritance rights, raise women's age of marriage to 18, prohibit men's right to divorce unilaterally and virtually abolish polygamy.
- Gaza Strip: Since being annexed by Egypt in 1959, the Gaza Strip has applied Egyptian penal law Article 291, although this has been repealed in Egypt itself in 1999. Article 291 allows any individual who commits sexual assault to avoid penalty if he enters into marriage with the female victim.
- California, United States: In 1959 the Government Code Section 12947.5 (part of the California Fair Employment and Housing Act, passed in California) declared in part, "It shall be an unlawful employment practice for an employer to refuse to permit an employee to wear pants on account of the sex of the employee", with exceptions only for "requiring an employee to wear a costume while that employee is portraying a specific character or dramatic role" and when good cause is shown. Thus, the standard California FEHA discrimination complaint form now includes an option for "denied the right to wear pants".

=== 1960s ===
1960

- Vietnam: The Vietnamese National Assembly adopted the Law on Marriage and Family in 1960, which is based on four major principles – freedom of marriage; monogamy; gender equality; and the protection of women's and children's rights.
- Afghanistan: The University of Kabul opened to women.
- Canada: Women gain the right to stand for election, with no restrictions/conditions.
- Jordan: Article 308 in the Jordanian Penal Code, enacted in 1960 (and abolished in 2017) originally allowed for an aggressor of sexual assault to avoid persecution and punishment if he married the victim. Only if the marriage lasted under three years did he need to serve his time. The article was amended in 2016, barring full pardon in cases of rape but keeping a loophole clause that pardoned perpetrators if they married the victim if she was aged between 15 and 18 and if the assault was regarded as "consensual".
- Kuwait: Article 182 states that if a rapist legally marries his victim with her guardian's permission, and the guardian requests that he is not punished, he won't be punished as he would be under Article 180.

1961

- Samoa: Samoan abortion law was defined in the Crimes Ordinance 1961 and amended by the Crimes Amendment Act of 1969. (Later the Crimes Ordinance 1961 was replaced by the Crimes Act 2013.) The Crimes Ordinance 1961 implicitly defined abortion as an action which caused the death of an unborn child and was not taken in good faith for preservation of the life of the mother. This carried a prison term of up to fourteen years if the action was deemed to be murder, or five years if the action was deemed to be manslaughter. From the Crimes Ordinance 1961: "73. Killing unborn child
- (1) Every one is liable to imprisonment for a term not exceeding 14 years who causes the death of any child that has not become a human being in such a manner that he would have been guilty of murder if the child had become a human being.
- (2) Every one is liable to imprisonment for a term not exceeding 5 years who causes the death of any child that has not become a human being in such a manner that he would have been guilty of manslaughter if the child had become a human being.
- (3) No one is guilty of any crime who before or during the birth of any child causes its death by means employed in good faith for the preservation of the life of the mother."
- El Salvador: Women gain the right to stand for election.
- Kuwait: Mandatory veiling is abolished for female public servants.
- India: The Dowry Prohibition Act of 1961 prohibits the request, payment or acceptance of a dowry, "as consideration for the marriage", where "dowry" is defined as a gift demanded or given as a precondition for a marriage. Gifts given without a precondition are not considered dowry, and are legal. Asking or giving of dowry can be punished by an imprisonment of up to six months, or a fine of up to ₹5,000 (US$53, £40 or A$77). It replaced several pieces of anti-dowry legislation that had been enacted by various Indian states. Murder and suicide under compulsion are addressed by India's criminal penal code.
- India: The Maternity Benefit Act, 1961.
- United States: Hoyt v. Florida, 368 U.S. 57 (1961), was an appeal by Gwendolyn Hoyt, who had killed her husband and received a jail sentence for second degree murder. Although she had suffered mental and physical abuse in her marriage, and showed neurotic, if not psychotic, behavior, a six-man jury deliberated for just twenty-five minutes before finding her guilty. They sentenced her to 30 years of hard labor. Hoyt claimed that her all-male jury led to discrimination and unfair circumstances during her trial. In a unanimous opinion written by Justice John Marshall Harlan II, Supreme Court of the United States held the Florida jury selection statute was not discriminatory.
- United States, Ohio: In State ex rel. Krupa v. Green, 177 N.E.2d 616 (Ohio 1961), the Ohio appellate court allowed a married woman to register to vote in her birth name which she had openly and solely used, and been well known to use, before her marriage, and held that she could use that name as a candidate for public office.
- Singapore: The Women's Charter is an Act of the Singaporean Parliament passed in 1961. The Act was designed to improve and protect the rights of women in Singapore and to guarantee greater legal equality for women in legally sanctioned relationships (except in the area of Muslim marriages, which are governed separately by the Administration of Muslim Law Act). Among other things, the Act provides for the institution of monogamous marriages, the rights of husbands and wives in marriage, the protection of the family, and the legal potentialities with regard to divorce and separation.
- Spain: The 1961 Law on Political Rights was supported by Sección Feminina. This amendment to the law gave women in the workforce additional rights, recognizing the importance of their work. The law saw single women being entitled to a salary similar to that of her male peers working in the same job. The law had one problem though in that married women still required permission from their husbands to accept a job.

1962

- Brazil: Legal majority for married women.
- Kuwait: The right to education and employment are secured to all citizens regardless of gender.
- Ireland: The Slander of Women Act 1891 was repealed for the Republic of Ireland on 1 January 1962.

1963

- United Kingdom: The Peerage Act 1963 (c. 48) is an act of the Parliament of the United Kingdom that, among other things, permits female hereditary peers to sit in the House of Lords.
- Guatemala: Legal majority for married women.
- Indonesia: Abolition of the requirement that married women must have their husbands' permission to initiate judicial proceedings.
- Papua New Guinea: Women gain the right to stand for election.
- United States: The Equal Pay Act of 1963 is a United States federal law amending the Fair Labor Standards Act, aimed at abolishing wage disparity based on sex (see Gender pay gap). It was signed into law on June 10, 1963, by John F. Kennedy as part of his New Frontier Program. In passing the bill, Congress stated that sex discrimination:
  - depresses wages and living standards for employees necessary for their health and efficiency;
  - prevents the maximum utilization of the available labor resources;
  - tends to cause labor disputes, thereby burdening, affecting, and obstructing commerce;
  - burdens commerce and the free flow of goods in commerce; and
  - constitutes an unfair method of competition.
  The law provides (in part) that:

No employer having employees subject to any provisions of this section [section 206 of title 29 of the United States Code] shall discriminate, within any establishment in which such employees are employed, between employees on the basis of sex by paying wages to employees in such establishment at a rate less than the rate at which he pays wages to employees of the opposite sex in such establishment for equal work on jobs[,] the performance of which requires equal skill, effort, and responsibility, and which are performed under similar working conditions, except where such payment is made pursuant to (i) a seniority system; (ii) a merit system; (iii) a system which measures earnings by quantity or quality of production; or (iv) a differential based on any other factor other than sex [...] For the first nine years of the EPA, the requirement of equal pay for equal work did not extend to persons employed in an executive, administrative or professional capacity, or as an outside salesperson. Therefore, the EPA exempted white-collar women from the protection of equal pay for equal work. In 1972, Congress enacted the Educational Amendment of 1972, which amended the FLSA to expand the coverage of the EPA to these employees, by excluding the EPA from the professional workers exemption of the FLSA.

- Spain: The blood revenge law was rescinded in 1963, with husbands and parents no longer having the right to kill wives or daughters caught engaging in illicit sex acts.
- Sweden: Abortion was legalized if there was a risk of serious fetal damage.

1964

- Afghanistan: The 1964 constitution state the equal right of women to education, employment and rights within marriage.
- United States: Title VII of the Civil Rights Act of 1964, codified as Subchapter VI of Chapter 21 of title 42 of the United States Code, prohibits discrimination by covered employers on the basis of race, color, religion, sex or national origin (see 42 U.S.C. § 2000e-2). Title VII applies to and covers an employer "who has fifteen (15) or more employees for each working day in each of twenty or more calendar weeks in the current or preceding calendar year" as written in the Definitions section under 42 U.S.C. §2000e(b). Title VII also prohibits discrimination against an individual because of his or her association with another individual of a particular race, color, religion, sex, or national origin, such as by an interracial marriage. The EEO Title VII has also been supplemented with legislation prohibiting pregnancy, age, and disability discrimination (See Pregnancy Discrimination Act of 1978, Age Discrimination in Employment Act, Americans with Disabilities Act of 1990).

In very narrowly defined situations, an employer is permitted to discriminate on the basis of a protected trait where the trait is a bona fide occupational qualification (BFOQ) reasonably necessary to the normal operation of that particular business or enterprise. To prove the bona fide occupational qualifications defense, an employer must prove three elements: a direct relationship between the protected trait and the ability to perform the duties of the job, the BFOQ relates to the "essence" or "central mission of the employer's business", and there is no less-restrictive or reasonable alternative (United Automobile Workers v. Johnson Controls, Inc., 499 U.S. 187 (1991) 111 S.Ct. 1196). The Bona Fide Occupational Qualification exception is an extremely narrow exception to the general prohibition of discrimination based on protected traits (Dothard v. Rawlinson, 433 U.S. 321 (1977) 97 S.Ct. 2720). An employer or customer's preference for an individual of a particular religion is not sufficient to establish a Bona Fide Occupational Qualification (Equal Employment Opportunity Commission v. Kamehameha School – Bishop Estate, 990 F.2d 458 (9th Cir. 1993)). There are partial and whole exceptions to Title VII for four types of employers:

- Federal government; (Comment: The proscriptions against employment discrimination under Title VII are now applicable to certain federal government offices under 42 U.S.C. Section 2000e-16)
- Federally recognized Native American tribes
- Religious groups performing work connected to the group's activities, including associated education institutions;
- Bona fide nonprofit private membership organizations.

- The Bennett Amendment is a US labor law provision in the Title VII of the Civil Rights Act of 1964, §703(h) passed to limit sex discrimination claims regarding pay to the rules in the Equal Pay Act of 1963. It says an employer can "differentiate upon the basis of sex" when it compensates employees "if such differentiation is authorized by" the Equal Pay Act.

- International: The Convention on Consent to Marriage, Minimum Age for Marriage, and Registration of Marriages was a treaty agreed upon in the United Nations on the standards of marriage. The treaty was opened for signature and ratification by General Assembly resolution 1763 A (XVII) on 7 November 1962 and entered into force 9 December 1964 by exchange of letters, in accordance with article 6. The Convention has been signed by 16 countries and there are 55 parties to the Convention.

The Convention reaffirms the consensual nature of marriages and requires the parties to establish a minimum marriage age by law and to ensure the registration of marriages.

- Pakistan: Family Court Act of 1964; it has proven to be unenforceable.
- Norway: In 1960, a new law allowed abortion by application approved by a commission of two physicians, and only on the basis of medical, eugenic, or criminal criteria, and with the consent of the husband if the applicant was married. This law went into effect in 1964.
- United States: The decision in the 1964 case of People of California v. Hernandez by the California Supreme Court brought into question the validity of the rule that mistake as to the age of a female is no defense to a statutory rape charge. The defendant was convicted of statutory rape, but the trial judge refused to allow defendant to present evidence that the defendant had a good faith belief the female subject was of age as a defense to the charge. Defendant filed an appeal, with the sole issue being the question of whether defendant's intent and knowledge at the time of the commission of the crime mattered in determining criminal culpability. The California Supreme Court held that "a charge of statutory rape is defensible [where] criminal intent is lacking," overruling and disapproving prior decisional law holding to the contrary, particularly People v. Ratz (1896) 115 Cal. 132. The decision set off a flurry of discussion among academics on whether "the uniform rule in the United states [that] a mistake as to the age of a female is not a defense to the crime of statutory rape," was now dead letter.

1965

- Cuba: The Cuban government decriminalized abortion in 1965.
- France: Married women obtained the right to work without their husbands' consent.
- Kuwait: Compulsory education for both boys and girls.
- United States: Griswold v. Connecticut, 381 U.S. 479 (1965), was a landmark decision of the U.S. Supreme Court in which the Court ruled that the Constitution of the United States protects the liberty of married couples to buy and use contraceptives without government restriction. The case involved a Connecticut "Comstock law" that prohibited any person from using "any drug, medicinal article or instrument for the purpose of preventing conception". The court held that the statute was unconstitutional, and that its effect was "to deny disadvantaged citizens ... access to medical assistance and up-to-date information in respect to proper methods of birth control". By a vote of 7–2, the Supreme Court invalidated the law on the grounds that it violated the "right to marital privacy", establishing the basis for the right to privacy with respect to intimate practices. This and other cases view the right to privacy as "protected from governmental intrusion".
- United States: The Equal Employment Opportunity Commission (EEOC) decided in 1965 that segregated job advertising—"Help Wanted Male" and "Help Wanted Female"—was permissible because it served "the convenience of readers". Advocates for women's rights founded the National Organization for Women (NOW) in June 1966 out of frustration with the enforcement of the sex bias provisions of the Civil Rights Act and Executive Order 11375.
- Sweden: Sweden made marital rape illegal.

1966

- Australia: Australia ended its ban on married women being employed in the Commonwealth Public Service.
- Kuwait: University education opened to women.
- United States, Mississippi: Mississippi reformed its abortion law and became the first U.S. state to allow abortion in cases of rape.
- United States: Pauli Murray and Dorothy Kenyon successfully argued White v. Crook, a case in which the U.S. Court of Appeals for the Fifth Circuit ruled that women have an equal right to serve on juries.
- Romania: Decree 770 was authorized by Nicolae Ceaușescu's government. The decree criminalized abortion except in the following cases:

– Women over 45 (lowered to 40 in 1974, raised back to 45 in 1985)
– Women who had already delivered and reared four children (raised to five in 1985)
– Women whose life would be threatened by carrying to term due to medical complications
– Women whose fetuses were malformed
– Women who were pregnant through rape or incest

1967

- United Kingdom: The Abortion Act 1967 (effective 1968) legalized abortion in the United Kingdom under certain grounds (except in Northern Ireland).
- France: The Neuwirth Act of 1967 authorizes contraception.
- United States: Executive Order 11375, signed by President Lyndon B. Johnson on October 13, 1967, banned discrimination on the basis of sex in hiring and employment in both the United States federal workforce and on the part of government contractors.
- United States: President Johnson signs Public Law 90-130, lifting grade restrictions and strength limitations on women in the United States military. Among other things, Public Law 90-130 amended 10 USC, eliminating the 2% ceiling on enlisted women. It also allowed female officers to be promoted to Colonel and above.
- United States, Maryland: In Erie Exchange v. Lane, 246 Md. 55 (1967) the Maryland Court of Appeals held that a married woman can lawfully adopt an assumed name, even if it is not her birth name or the name of her lawful husband, without legal proceedings.
- United States: Section 230.3 Abortion (Tentative draft 1959, Official draft 1962) of the American Law Institute (ALI) Model Penal Code (MPC) was used as a model for abortion law reform legislation enacted in 13 states from 1967 to 1972. It would legalize abortion to preserve the health (whether physical or mental) of the mother, as well as if the pregnancy is due to incest or rape, or if doctors agree that there is a significant risk that the child will be born with a serious mental or physical defect.
- United States, California, Colorado, Oregon, and North Carolina: Colorado became the first state to decriminalize abortion in cases of rape, incest, or in which pregnancy would lead to permanent physical disability of the woman, and similar laws were passed in California, Oregon, and North Carolina.
- England and Wales: In England and Wales, the only part of the United Kingdom where the law against being a common scold had any effect, section 13(1)(a) of the Criminal Law Act 1967 abolished it.
- Pakistan: Anti-dowry law of 1967; it has proven to be unenforceable.

1968

- Bulgaria: Abortions were severely restricted by a Government decree of February 1968, issued to counter declining birth rates. Most abortions required approval by a special medical board, and they were banned entirely for childless women, with only medical exceptions. Only women over 45 or with three or more children could obtain an abortion on request, except if the pregnancy was past 10 weeks or the woman had obtained an abortion in the previous six months.
- Argentina: Legal majority for married women.
- United States: King v. Smith, 392 U.S. 309 (1968), was a decision in which the Supreme Court of the United States held that Aid to Families with Dependent Children (AFDC) could not be withheld because of the presence of a "substitute father" who visited a family on weekends.
- United States: The Equal Employment Opportunity Commission declared age restrictions on flight attendants' employment to be illegal sex discrimination under Title VII of the Civil Rights Act of 1964.
- United States, Maryland, Prince George's County: In 1967 Kathryn Kusner applied for a jockey license through the Maryland Racing Commission but was denied because she was a woman. However, in 1968 Judge Ernest A. Loveless of the Circuit Court of Prince George's County ordered her to be granted the license. Kusner thus became the first licensed female jockey in the United States.
- United States, Georgia and Maryland: Georgia and Maryland reformed their abortion laws based on the American Law Institute (ALI) Model Penal Code (MPC).
- United States, Mississippi: On June 15, 1968, a law making women eligible to serve on state court juries was signed by Gov. John Bell Williams. Mississippi was the last state in America to allow this.
- United States, Texas: The Marital Property Act of 1967, which gave married women the same property rights as their husbands, went into effect on January 1, 1968.
- United States, California: The Southern Pacific Railroad rejected Leah Rosenfeld's claims for promotion, citing the California state law that barred women from performing the duties of station agents. On August 30, 1968, she filed suit against the State of California, the Southern Pacific Railroad, and her union, then known as the Transportation Communications International Union. On November 25, 1968, the suit against the Southern Pacific Railroad was settled and the California women's protective laws were declared unconstitutional.

1969

- Portugal: Legal majority for married women.
- Sierra Leone: The Special Court for Sierra Leone's (SCSL) Appeals Chamber found the abduction and confinement of women for "forced marriage" in war to be a new crime against humanity (AFRC decision).
- Iraq: Article 427 of Iraq's penal code, in its current form dating from 1969, states that if the perpetrator of rape lawfully marries the victim, any legal action becomes void.
- United States, Arkansas, Delaware, Kansas, New Mexico and Oregon: Arkansas, Delaware, Kansas, New Mexico and Oregon reformed their abortion laws based on the American Law Institute (ALI) Model Penal Code (MPC).
- Canada: Canada passed the Criminal Law Amendment Act, 1968-69, which began to allow abortion for selective reasons.
- Australia: The ruling in the Victorian case of R v Davidson defined for the first time which abortions were lawful in Australia.
- New South Wales, Australia: Legislation in 1969 legalised abortion when necessary to protect the life or physical or mental health of the woman—taking into account the current and reasonably foreseeable future—or in cases when the child was likely to be born with serious handicaps.
- United States: In the case Weeks v. Southern Bell (1969), Lorena Weeks claimed that Southern Bell had violated her rights under the 1964 Civil Rights Act when they denied her application for promotion to a higher paying position because she was a woman. She won her case in 1969 after several appeals.
- Samoa: Samoan abortion law was defined in the Crimes Ordinance 1961 and amended by the Crimes Amendment Act of 1969. The Crimes Amendment Act of 1969 inserted §§ 73A–73D into the Crimes Ordinance 1961, explicitly defining abortion and stating that a violator of the following is liable to imprisonment for a term not exceeding seven years.
- Procuring abortion (§§73A)
- Female procuring her own miscarriage (§§73B)
- Supplying means of procuring abortion (§§73C)
  - Effectiveness of means used immaterial (§§73D)
- Yugoslavia: Yugoslavia legalized abortion in 1952 based on a medical, eugenic or a legal indication. In 1960, a social indication was also allowed.
- United States, California: In 1969, the California Supreme Court ruled in favor of abortion rights, after hearing an appeal launched by Dr. Leon Belous, who had been convicted of referring a woman to someone who could provide her with an illegal abortion; California's abortion law was declared unconstitutional in People v. Belous because it was vague and denied people due process.

=== 1970s ===
==== 1970 ====
- Australia, Queensland: The law was changed to allow women to be served drinks in public bars in Queensland.
- Finland: Finnish abortion law was liberalized in 1970. The 1970 law allowed abortion up to 16 weeks of pregnancy for broad socioeconomic reasons, if the woman was younger than 17, if the woman was older than 40, if the woman had already had four children, or if at least one parent would be unable to raise the child owing to disease or mental disturbance. This time limit was lowered from 16 to 12 weeks in 1979. The 1970 law also allowed abortion up to 20 weeks of pregnancy in the event of fetal deformity or physical threat to the woman's health.
- Denmark: Abortion was first allowed in 1939 by application; if the doctors deemed the pregnancy fell into one of three categories (harmful or fatal to the mother, high risk for birth defects, or a pregnancy borne out of rape), a woman could legally have her pregnancy terminated. An addendum to the 1939 law was passed on 24 March 1970, allowing on-demand abortions only for women under the age of 18 who were deemed "ill-equipped for motherhood", and women over the age of 38.
- United States, Hawaii, New York, Alaska and Washington: Hawaii, New York, Alaska and Washington repealed their abortion laws. Hawaii became the first state to legalize abortions on the request of the woman, New York repealed its 1830 law and allowed abortions up to the 24th week of pregnancy, and Washington held a referendum on legalizing early pregnancy abortions, becoming the first state to legalize abortion through a vote of the people.
- United States, South Carolina and Virginia: South Carolina and Virginia reformed their abortion laws based on the American Law Institute Model Penal Code.
- United States, Florida: Mary Grizzle introduced and passed the Married Women Property Rights Act, which became law in 1970, giving married women in Florida, for the first time, the right to own property solely in their names and to transfer that property without their husbands' signatures.
- England: In England until 1970 a woman whose fiancé broke off their engagement could sue him for breach of promise, whilst a woman, historically regarded as the weaker sex, was permitted to change her mind without penalty.
- Democratic Republic of the Congo: Women gain the right to stand for election.
- Ecuador: Married women granted separate economy.
- France: The paternal authority of a man over his family was ended in 1970 (before that parental responsibilities belonged solely to the father who made all legal decisions concerning the children).
- United States: In 1970, Eleanor Holmes Norton represented sixty female employees of Newsweek who had filed a claim with the Equal Employment Opportunity Commission that Newsweek had a policy of only allowing men to be reporters. The women won, and Newsweek agreed to allow women to be reporters. The day the claim was filed, Newsweek's cover article was "Women in Revolt", covering the feminist movement; the article was written by a woman who had been hired on a freelance basis since there were no female reporters at the magazine.
- United States: The Title X Family Planning Program, officially known as Public Law 91-572 or "Population Research and Voluntary Family Planning Programs", was enacted under President Richard Nixon in 1970 as part of the Public Health Service Act. Title X is the only federal grant program dedicated solely to providing individuals with comprehensive family planning and related preventive health services. Title X is legally designed to prioritize the needs of low-income families or uninsured people (including those who are not eligible for Medicaid) who might not otherwise have access to these health care services. These services are provided to low-income and uninsured individuals at reduced or no cost. Its overall purpose is to promote positive birth outcomes and healthy families by allowing individuals to decide the number and spacing of their children. The other health services provided in Title X-funded clinics are integral in achieving this objective.
- United States: Schultz v. Wheaton Glass Co., 421 F.2d 259 (3rd Cir. 1970) was a case heard before the United States Court of Appeals for the Third Circuit in 1970. It is an important case in studying the impact of the Bennett Amendment on Chapter VII of the Civil Rights Act of 1964, helping to define the limitations of equal pay for men and women. In its rulings, the court determined that a job that is "substantially equal" in terms of what the job entails, although not necessarily in title or job description, is protected by the Equal Pay Act. An employer who hires a woman to do the same job as a man but gives the job a new title in order to offer it a lesser pay is discriminating under that act.
- United States: Congress removed references to contraception from federal anti-obscenity laws.
- United States: In Sprogis v. United Air Lines, Inc., a U.S. federal trial court ruled in a female flight attendant's favor on whether airline marriage bans were illegal under Title VII. The court found that neither sex nor marital status was a bona fide occupational qualification for the flight attendant occupation. The court's ruling was upheld upon appeal.
- United States: Women were not allowed in McSorley's Old Ale House's until August 10, 1970, after National Organization for Women attorneys Faith Seidenberg and Karen DeCrow filed a discrimination case against the bar in District Court and won. The two entered McSorley's in 1969, and were refused service, which was the basis for their lawsuit for discrimination. The case decision made the front page of The New York Times on June 26, 1970. The suit, Seidenberg v. McSorleys' Old Ale House (1970, United States District Court, S. D. New York) established that, as a public place, the bar could not violate the Equal Protection Clause of the United States Constitution. The bar was then forced to admit women, but it did so "kicking and screaming." With the ruling allowing women to be served, the bathroom became unisex. But it was not until sixteen years later that a ladies room was installed.
- United Kingdom: The Equal Pay Act 1970 was an act of the United Kingdom Parliament, which prohibited any less favorable treatment between men and women in terms of pay and conditions of employment.
- United States, Illinois: The equal protection of the laws shall not be denied or abridged on account of sex by the State or its units of local government and school districts.- Illinois Constitution, Article I, §18 (1970).
- Spain: A reform in 1970 meant that women could prevent their husbands putting their children up for adoption without their consent.

==== 1971 ====
- United States: The restriction of hiring only women as flight attendants was lifted at all airlines in 1971 due to the decisive court case of Diaz v. Pan Am.
- United States, California: From 1947 until 1971, women were banned from bartending in California unless they were the bar's owner or were married to the bar's owner. The case overturning this law was Sail’er Inn, Inc. v. Kirby, decided by the Supreme Court of California; it overturned the law but added a new provision banning women from tending bar topless.
- United States, Milwaukee, Wisconsin: After the end of Prohibition in the United States in 1933, Milwaukee did not grant women bartending licenses, unless the women were the daughters or wives of the bar's owner. In 1970, Dolly Williams filed a complaint with the state regarding this, and the Wisconsin Department of Industry, Labor, and Human Relations ordered the city to stop banning female bartenders. Milwaukee appealed against this, but in March 1971, a Madison court sided with Wisconsin and Milwaukee's common council announced that beginning April 1, 1971, gender would stop being an obstacle to obtaining a bartending license.
- United States, Alaska: Alaska repealed its statute that said inducing an abortion was a criminal offense.
- Malaysia: In 1971, the Parliament of Malaysia amended Section 312 of the Penal Code to permit abortion to save a woman's life.
- Australia, New South Wales: The interpretation of the law regarding abortion is subject to the Levine ruling, from R v Wald of 1971, (Note: R v Wald (1971) 3 NSW DCR 25. Confirmed in CES v Superclinics Australia Pty Ltd.) itself derived from the Victorian Menhennitt ruling, which held an abortion to be legal if a doctor had an honest and reasonable belief that, due to "any economic, social or medical ground or reason", the abortion was necessary to "preserve the woman involved from serious danger to her life or physical or mental health which the continuance of the pregnancy would entail".
- Northern Mariana Islands: In a 1971 case, Trust Territory v. Tarkong, the Appellate Court of the Trust Territory (see also United States territorial court) held:
  As far as the woman herself is concerned, unless the abortion statute expressly makes her responsible, it is generally held, although the statute reads any "person", that she is not liable to any criminal prosecution, whether she solicits the act or performs it upon herself.
- Egypt: The new constitution confirms equality before the law and women's right to inheritance, property, education, employment and divorce.
- Switzerland: Women allowed to stand for election at federal level.
- United States, Pennsylvania: Equality of rights under the law shall not be denied or abridged in the Commonwealth of Pennsylvania because of the sex of the individual. – Pennsylvania Constitution, Article I, § 28.
- United States, Virginia: That no person shall be deprived of his life, liberty, or property without due process of law; that the General Assembly shall not pass any law impairing the obligation of contracts; and that the right to be free from any governmental discrimination upon the basis of religious conviction, race, color, sex, or national origin shall not be abridged, except that the mere separation of the sexes shall not be considered discrimination. – Virginia Constitution, Article I, §11 (1971).
- United States: Barring women from practicing law was prohibited in the U.S. in 1971.
- United States: United States v. Vuitch, 402 U.S. 62 (1971) was a United States Supreme Court abortion rights case, which held that the District of Columbia's abortion law banning the practice except when necessary for the health or life of the woman was not unconstitutionally vague.
- United States: Reed v. Reed, 404 U.S. 71 (1971), was an Equal Protection case in the United States in which the Supreme Court ruled that the administrators of estates cannot be named in a way that discriminates between sexes. The Supreme Court ruled for the first time in Reed v. Reed that the Equal Protection Clause of the Fourteenth Amendment prohibited differential treatment based on sex.
- United States: Phillips v. Martin Marietta Corp., 400 U.S. 542 (1971), was a United States Supreme Court case in which the Court held that under Title VII of the Civil Rights Act of 1964, an employer may not, in the absence of business necessity, refuse to hire women with pre-school-age children while hiring men with such children. It was the first sex discrimination case under Title VII to reach the Court.
- India: The Indian Parliament under the Prime Ministership of Indira Gandhi, passes the Medical Termination of Pregnancy Act 1971 (MTP Act 1971). India thus becomes one of the earliest nations to pass this Act. The Act gains importance, considering India had traditionally been a very conservative country in these matters. Most notably there was no similar Act in several US states around the same time.
- Norway: Norway made marital rape illegal.

==== 1972 ====
- United States, Connecticut: In Abele v. Markle, 351 F. Supp. 224 (D. Conn. 1972) it was ruled that a Connecticut statute prohibiting abortions, except to save the life of the mother, was unconstitutional.
- United States, Kentucky: Since the late 1700s or possibly the early 1800s, it was illegal for women in Kentucky to be bartenders and to be served spirits or wine while sitting at a bar. This was suspended at the beginning of Prohibition in the United States, but was brought back in 1938. In 1968, Dixie Demuth (owner of the bar Dixie's Elbow Room) was charged with having a woman bartender and serving a mixed drink to a woman, Demuth’s own daughter, sitting at the bar. A Franklin Circuit judge sided with Demuth in 1970, but the case was appealed to the Kentucky Court of Appeals, which was then the highest court in Kentucky. In 1972 that court ruled in Demuth’s favor, legalizing women bartending and being served spirits or wine while sitting at bars in Kentucky.
- United States, New York: The New York State Court of Appeals ruled that Bernice Gera could be a baseball umpire.
- Bolivia: Married women granted separate economy.
- Bolivia: Legal majority for married women.
- Luxembourg: Legal majority for married women.
- United States, Washington: Equality of rights and responsibility under the law shall not be denied or abridged on account of sex. – Washington Constitution, ARTICLE XXXI, §1 (1972).
- United States, Alaska: No person is to be denied the enjoyment of any civil or political right because of race, color, creed, sex or national origin. The legislature shall implement this section. – Alaska Constitution, Article I, §3 (1972).
- United States, Maryland: Equality of rights under the law shall not be abridged or denied because of sex. – Maryland Constitution, Declaration of Rights, Article 46 (1972).
- United States, Texas: Equality under the law shall not be denied or abridged because of sex, race, color, creed, or national origin. This amendment is self-operative. – Texas Constitution, Article I, §3a (1972).
- United States: Title IX is a portion of the United States Education Amendments of 1972, Public Law No. 92‑318, 86 Stat. 235 (June 23, 1972), codified at 20 U.S.C. §§ 1681–1688, co-authored and introduced by Senator Birch Bayh; it was renamed the Patsy Mink Equal Opportunity in Education Act in 2002, after its late House co-author and sponsor. It states (in part) that:

No person in the United States shall, on the basis of sex, be excluded from participation in, be denied the benefits of, or be subjected to discrimination under any education program or activity receiving federal financial assistance.

- United States: Eisenstadt v. Baird, 405 U.S. 438 (1972), is a United States Supreme Court case that established the right of unmarried people to possess contraception on the same basis as married couples. The Court struck down a Massachusetts law prohibiting the distribution of contraceptives to unmarried people for the purpose of preventing pregnancy, ruling that it violated the Equal Protection Clause of the Constitution.
- United States: The common law offence of being a common scold was extant in New Jersey until struck down in 1972 (in State v. Palendrano) by Circuit Judge McGann who found it had been subsumed in the provisions of the Disorderly Conduct Act of 1898, was bad for vagueness and offended the 14th Amendment to the US Constitution for sex discrimination. It was also opined that the punishment of ducking could amount to a corpor(e)al punishment, in which case that punishment was unlawful under the New Jersey Constitution of 1844 or since 1776.
- United States: Under § 215 of the Social Security Act (42 USCS 415), old-age insurance benefits are computed on the basis of the wage earner's "average monthly wage" earned during their "benefit computation years", which are the "elapsed years" (reduced by five) during which their covered wages were highest. Under the pre-1972 version, the computation for old age insurance benefits was such that a woman obtained larger benefits than a man of the same age having the same earnings record. The 1972 amendment altered the formula for computing benefits so as to eliminate the previous distinction between men and women, but only as to men reaching the age of 62 in 1975 or later; it was not given retroactive application.
- United States: The 10th Circuit case Moritz v. Commissioner successfully challenged the denial of a dependent-care deduction to a single man who was a caretaker for his sick mother; the deduction had previously been limited to women, widowers, or divorced men.
- United States, Maryland: In Stuart v. Board of Elections, 266 Md. 440, 446, on the question of whether a wife could register to vote in her birth name rather than her husband's last name, the Maryland Court of Appeals held, "[A] married woman's surname does not become that of her husband where, as here, she evidences a clear intent to consistently and nonfraudulently use her birth given name subsequent to her marriage."
- United States, Florida: Florida reformed its abortion law based on the American Law Institute Model Penal Code.
- Spain: Law 31/1972 changed the law in respect to articles 320 and 321. It reduced the age of majority to 21 in all cases for women, and allowed women to act as an adult in civil life. This meant both men and women reached majority when they were 21.
- Spain: The law changed in 1972 to give women more freedom from their fathers. It allowed women 22 years old and older to leave the familial home without the consent of their parents.

==== 1973 ====
- Denmark: Abortion in Denmark was fully legalized on 1 October 1973, allowing the procedure to be done on-demand if a woman's pregnancy has not exceeded its 12th week.
- United States, California: In Rentzer v. Unemployment Ins. Appeals Bd. (1973), Gail Rentzer suffered from an ectopic pregnancy and was therefore unable to work. She was denied compensation by the California Unemployment Insurance Appeals Board because they did not recognize pregnancy or related medical complications as a disability. But after a lawsuit was filed, the California Court of Appeals found that because Gail had not had a normal pregnancy and her emergency surgery was performed to stop bleeding and save her life, her pregnancy was deemed worthy of disability benefits. This case allowed women with medical complications during pregnancy to be granted benefits and more protections, such as disability coverage for not just pregnancy, but also the amount of time it takes for recovery from complications.
- United States, Colorado: Equality of rights under the law shall not be denied or abridged by the state of Colorado or any of its political subdivisions because of sex. – Colorado Constitution, Article II, §29 (1973).
- United States, Montana: Individual dignity. The dignity of the human being is inviolable. No person shall be denied the equal protection of the laws. Neither the state nor any person, firm, corporation, or institution shall discriminate against any person in the exercise of his civil or political rights on account of race, color, sex, culture, social origin or condition, or political or religious ideas. – Montana Constitution, Article II, §4 (1973).
- United States, New Mexico: No person shall be deprived of life, liberty or property without due process of law; nor shall any person be denied equal protection of the laws. Equality of rights under law shall not be denied on account of the sex of any person. – New Mexico Constitution, Article II, §18 (1973).
- Ireland: The marriage bar was introduced in Ireland in 1932; it prevented any married woman from working in the public sector. In 1973, the marriage bar was removed in Ireland.
- England and Wales: The Matrimonial Causes Act 1973 stipulates that a forced marriage is voidable.
- Andorra: Women gain the right to stand for election.
- San Marino: Women gain the right to stand for election.
- United States: Roe v. Wade, 410 U.S. 113 (1973) was a landmark decision by the United States Supreme Court on the issue of abortion. The Court ruled 7–2 that a right to privacy under the Due Process Clause of the 14th Amendment extended to a woman's decision to have an abortion, but that this right must be balanced against the state's two legitimate interests in regulating abortions: protecting women's health and protecting the potentiality of human life. Arguing that these state interests became stronger over the course of a pregnancy, the Court resolved this balancing test by tying state regulation of abortion to the third trimester of pregnancy.
- United States: Doe v. Bolton, 410 U.S. 179 (1973), was a decision of the United States Supreme Court overturning the abortion law of Georgia. The Supreme Court's decision was released on January 22, 1973, the same day as the decision in the better-known case of Roe v. Wade, 410 U.S. 113 (1973). Doe v. Bolton challenged Georgia's much more liberal abortion statute.
- United States: Frontiero v. Richardson, 411 U.S. 677 (1973), was a landmark United States Supreme Court case which decided that benefits given by the United States military to the family of service members cannot be given out differently because of sex.
- United States: Pittsburgh Press Co. v. Pittsburgh Commission on Human Relations, 413 U.S. 376 (1973), was a 1973 decision of the United States Supreme Court which upheld an ordinance enacted in Pittsburgh that forbids sex-designated classified advertising for job opportunities, against a claim by the parent company of the Pittsburgh Press that the ordinance violated its First Amendment rights.
- United States: From 1973 on, the United States Agency for International Development (USAID) has followed the Helms Amendment ruling, banning use of U.S. government funds to provide abortion as a method of family planning anywhere in the world.
- United States: The "Percy Amendment" of the Foreign Assistance Act required U.S. development assistance to integrate women into its programs, leading to USAID's creation of its Women in Development (WID) office in 1974.
- Tunisia: Tunisia enacted a law which forbade Muslim women from marrying non-Muslims; this law was eventually removed in 2017.
- United Kingdom: The United Kingdom began putting a value-added tax on sanitary products when it joined the European Economic Community in 1973.
- South Korea: The South Korean abortion law was amended by the Maternal and Child Health Law of 1973, which permitted a physician to perform an abortion if the pregnant woman or her spouse suffered from certain hereditary or communicable diseases, if the pregnancy resulted from rape or incest, or if continuing the pregnancy would jeopardize the woman's health. Any physician who violated the law was punished by two years' imprisonment. Self-induced abortions were illegal, and punishable by a fine or imprisonment.
- Bolivia: Abortion in Bolivia is illegal, except in the cases of rape, incest, or to protect the woman's health. This policy forms part of the Penal Code laid down in 1973, and has been in force since then.
- El Salvador: Under the new Penal Code of 1973, an abortion could be legally allowed under three major conditions: if the pregnant woman's life was endangered and abortion was the only means to preserve it, if her pregnancy had resulted from rape or statutory rape, or if a serious congenital disorder was detected in the fetus. An abortion caused on part of the woman's negligence was exempted from prosecution, and the government also provided reduced penalties for a woman of good standing if she had consented to an illegal abortion, or self-induced one, in the interest of protecting her reputation.
- Guatemala: Abortion in Guatemala is illegal, except when needed to save the woman's life. Abortion was illegal without exception prior to 1973. Congressional Decree 17–73 altered the penal code to allow abortion in cases in which the pregnant woman's life is endangered in September 1973. The procedure must be done by a physician and approved by a second doctor.
- Bulgaria: Abortion restrictions were extended in April 1973 to cover women with no children or only one child; abortions could only be obtained in case of rape or incest, for unmarried childless women under 18, for women over 45 with one living child, or in cases of disease endangering the woman's life or the viability of the fetus.
- United States, Eighth Circuit jurisdiction: On April 18, 1973, the United States Court of Appeals for the Eighth Circuit ruled that girls could not be banned from high school sports teams for non-contact sports.

==== 1974 ====
- United States: Cleveland Board of Education v. LaFleur, 414 U.S. 632 (1974), found that overly restrictive maternity leave regulations in public schools violate the Due Process Clause of the Fifth Amendment and the Fourteenth Amendment.
- Kentucky: Kentucky adopted a law preventing public hospitals from performing abortion procedures except to protect the life of the mother.
- Canada: Canada (AG) v Lavell, [1974] S.C.R. 1349, was a landmark 5–4 Supreme Court of Canada decision holding that Section 12(1)(b) of the Indian Act did not violate the respondents' right to "equality before the law" under Section 1 (b) of the Canadian Bill of Rights. The two respondents, Lavell and Bédard, had alleged that the impugned section was discriminatory under the Canadian Bill of Rights by virtue of the fact that it deprived Indian women of their status for marrying a non-Indian, but not Indian-men. The Supreme Court's decision proved very controversial, later influencing the wording of Section 15 of the Canadian Charter of Rights and Freedoms during the drafting process.
- Singapore; The Abortion Act 1974 was passed to replace the expired act from 1969. It closely resembled the previous legislation. However, the five circumstances in which a termination of pregnancy would be granted were removed, allowing the treatment on request. Also, the patient was the only person required to give consent for the procedure to go ahead.
- Bulgaria: Abortion restrictions were slightly relaxed in 1974, but most restrictions remained until a decree of 1 February 1990.
- United States, Connecticut: No person shall be denied the equal protection of the law nor be subjected to segregation or discrimination in the exercise or enjoyment of his or her civil or political rights because of religion, race, color, ancestry, national origin or sex. – Connecticut Constitution, Article I, §20 (1974).
- United States, New Hampshire: All men have certain natural, essential, and inherent rights – among which are, the enjoying and defending life and liberty; acquiring, possessing, and protecting, property; and, in a word, of seeking and obtaining happiness. Equality of rights under the law shall not be denied or abridged by this state on account of race, creed, color, sex or national origin. – New Hampshire Constitution, Part First, Article 2 (1974).
- United States: Geduldig v. Aiello, 417 U.S. 484 (1974), was an equal protection case in the United States in which the Supreme Court ruled on whether unfavorable treatment to pregnant women could count as sex discrimination. It held that the denial of insurance benefits for work loss resulting from a normal pregnancy did not violate the Fourteenth Amendment. The California insurance program at issue did not exclude workers from eligibility based on sex but did exclude pregnancy from a list of compensable disabilities. The majority found that even though only women would be directly affected by the administrative decision, the classification of normal pregnancy as non-compensable was not a sex-based classification, and therefore the court would defer to the state so long as it could provide a rational basis for its categorization.
- United States: The Equal Credit Opportunity Act (ECOA) is a United States law (codified at 15 U.S.C. § 1691 et seq.), enacted in 1974, that makes it unlawful for any creditor to discriminate against any applicant, with respect to any aspect of a credit transaction, on the basis of race, color, religion, national origin, sex, marital status, or age (provided the applicant has the capacity to contract); to the fact that all or part of the applicant's income derives from a public assistance program; or to the fact that the applicant has in good faith exercised any right under the Consumer Credit Protection Act. The law applies to any person who, in the ordinary course of business, regularly participates in a credit decision, including banks, retailers, bankcard companies, finance companies, and credit unions. Failure to comply with the Equal Credit Opportunity Act's Regulation B can subject a financial institution to civil liability for actual and punitive damages in individual or class actions. Liability for punitive damages can be as much as $10,000 in individual actions and the lesser of $500,000 or 1% of the creditor's net worth in class actions.
- Spain: Angela Hernandez (also known as Angela Hernandez Gomez and just Angela), of Spain, won a case in the Spanish Supreme Court allowing women to be bullfighters in Spain; a prohibition against women doing so was put in place in Spain in 1908.
- International: The Declaration on the Protection of Women and Children in Emergency and Armed Conflict was adopted by the United Nations in 1974 and went into force the same year. It was proposed by the United Nations Economic and Social Council, on the grounds that women and children are often the victims of wars, civil unrest, and other emergency situations that cause them to suffer "inhuman acts and consequently suffer serious harm".
- Portugal: Article 400 of the Portuguese penal code of 1886, which still functioned in post-colonial Mozambique until its replacement on 11 July 2014, stated that rapists who married their victim would not be punished. The law was not applied since independence in 1974. It was repealed in 2014.
- Ireland: McGee v. The Attorney General [1974] IR 284 was a case in the Irish Supreme Court in 1974 that referenced Article 41 of the Irish Constitution. It concerned Mary McGee, whose condition was such that she was advised by her physician that if she would become pregnant again her life would be endangered. She was then instructed to use a diaphragm and spermicidal jelly that was prescribed to her. However, Section 17 of the Criminal Law Amendment Act, 1935 prohibited her from acquiring the prescription. The Supreme Court ruled by a 4 to 1 majority in favor of her, after determining that married couples have the constitutional right to make private decisions on family planning.
- United States: In Kahn v. Shevin the Supreme Court ruled that a Florida statute providing property tax exemptions only to widows does not violate the Equal Protection Clause of the Fourteenth Amendment.
- United States: In Kaplowitz v. University of Chicago, 387 F.Supp. 42 (N.D.Ill.1974), the U.S. District Court for the Northern District of Illinois ruled that a law school was not required to police the discriminatory practices of employers using its placement facilities. The court did find that the law school was an employment agency, but found that employment agencies are only obligated to refer potential employees without discrimination.
- United States: The Women's Educational Equity Act (WEEA) of 1974 is one of the several landmark laws passed by the United States Congress outlining federal protections against the gender discrimination of women in education (educational equity). WEEA was enacted as Section 513 of P.L. 93-380. In 1984, Congress rewrote the WEEA legislation.
- United States: Sex was added as a protected characteristic to the Fair Housing Act in 1974.
- United States: Due to a lawsuit brought on behalf of Maria Pepe by the National Organization for Women, the New Jersey Superior Court decided that Little League Baseball must allow girls to play.
- United States: In the final week of December 1974, President Gerald Ford signed into law a bill that opened Little League Baseball to girls.
- Mexico: Mexico introduced the Ley General de Población, a law requiring the government to provide free family planning services in all public health clinics and a National Program for Family Planning to coordinate it.

==== 1975 ====
- Mexico: Mexico amended its constitution to recognize every Mexican citizen's "right to freely decide, in a responsible and informed manner, on the number and spacing of their children."
- Austria: Abortion in Austria has been fully legalized since 1 January 1975. However, the 1975 law protects doctors who choose not to perform abortions.
- United States, Texas: On February 19, 1975, the Texas Supreme Court's ruling in the case Jacobs v. Theimer made Texas the first state in America to declare a woman could sue her doctor for a wrongful birth. That case involved Dortha Jean Jacobs (later Dortha Biggs), who caught rubella while pregnant and gave birth to Lesli, who was severely disabled. Dortha and her husband sued her doctor, saying he did not diagnose the rubella or warn them how it would affect the pregnancy.
- Greenland: Abortion in Greenland was legalized on 12 June 1975, under legislation equivalent to the Danish law.
- New Zealand: The New Zealand Parliament passed Gerard Wall's Hospitals Amendment Act 1975 which limited the provision of abortion services to licensed hospitals. The Hospitals Amendment Act was later invalidated on technical grounds.
- United States, Louisiana: No person shall be denied the equal protection of the laws. No law shall discriminate against a person because of race or religious ideas, beliefs, or affiliations. No law shall arbitrarily, capriciously, or unreasonably discriminate against a person because of birth, age, sex, culture, physical condition, or political ideas or affiliations. – Louisiana Constitution, Article I, §3 (1975).
- United Kingdom: The Sex Discrimination Act 1975 (c. 65) is an act of the Parliament of the United Kingdom which protected men and women from discrimination on the grounds of sex or marital status. The act concerned employment, training, education, harassment, the provision of goods and services, and the disposal of premises.
- Sweden: The current Abortion Act (SFS 1974:595 with later amendments in 1995 and 2007) entered into force on 1 January 1975. It permits abortion on the request of the pregnant woman until the 18th week, and thereafter only in cases of severe indications of medical risk. After the 18th week, abortions can only be performed after an evaluation by the National Board of Health and Welfare.
- Spain: Abolition of the permiso marital (which required married women to have their husbands' consent for nearly all economic activities, including employment, ownership of property and traveling away from home). Women were no longer required by law to obey their husbands or forced to take their husbands' nationality. The amendment in Article 62 stated, "Marriage does not restrict the capacity of one of the spouses to act." Article 63 removed the requirement that a wife obey her husband, and was amended to specify that both spouses had a mutual obligation to respect and protect each other. The law was also changed so that husbands were no longer married women's legal representatives by default.
- France: The Veil Law legalized abortion.
- France: In France, Article 324 legally permitted the murders of an unfaithful wife and her lover at the hand of her husband, though only "at the moment" when the wife and her lover were "[caught] in the fact" by the husband in the matrimonial home. On November 7, 1975, Law no. 617/75 Article 17 repealed Article 324.
- Austria: abolition of the requirement that married women must have their husbands' permission to initiate judicial proceeding.
- Italy: Law no 151/1975 provides for gender equality within marriage, abolishing the legal dominance of the husband.
- United States: Stanton v. Stanton, was a 421 U.S. 7 (1975) United States Supreme Court case which struck down Utah's definitions of adulthood as a violation of equal protection: females reached adulthood at 18; males at 21.
- United States: Weinberger v. Wiesenfeld, 420 U.S. 636 (1975), was a decision by the United States Supreme Court, which unanimously held that the gender-based distinction under 42 U.S.C. § 402(g) of the Social Security Act of 1935—which permitted widows but not widowers to collect special benefits while caring for minor children—violated the right to equal protection secured by the Due Process Clause of the Fifth Amendment to the United States Constitution.
- United States: Taylor v. Louisiana, 419 U.S. 522 (1975), is a significant Supreme Court of the United States case, which held women could not be excluded from a venire, or jury pool, on the basis of having to register for jury duty.
- United States: Schlesinger v. Ballard, 419 U.S. 498 (1975), was a United States Supreme Court case that upheld a federal statute granting female Naval officers four more years of commissioned service before mandatory discharge than male Naval officers. A federal statute granted female Naval officers fourteen years of commissioned service while allowing only nine years of commissioned service for male Naval officers before mandatory discharge. The Supreme Court held that the law passed intermediate scrutiny equal protection analysis because women, excluded from combat duty, had fewer opportunities for advancement in the military. The Court found the statute to directly compensate for the past statutory barriers to advancement.
- United States: Joan Little became the first woman in United States history to be acquitted using the defense that she used deadly force to resist sexual assault.
- United States, Tennessee: In Dunn v. Palermo, the Supreme Court of Tennessee held that "in this jurisdiction a woman, upon marriage, has a freedom of choice. She may elect to retain her own surname or she may adopt the surname of her husband. The choice is hers. We hold that a person's legal name is that given at birth, or as voluntarily changed by either spouse at the time of marriage, or as changed by affirmative acts as provided under the Constitution and laws of the State of Tennessee. So long as a person's name remains constant and consistent, and unless and until changed in the prescribed manner, and absent any fraudulent or legally impermissible intent, the State has no legitimate concern."
- United States, Wisconsin: In Kruzel v. Podell (1975), the Supreme Court of Wisconsin decided that a woman upon marriage adopts the last name of her husband by customarily using that name after marriage, but also stated that no law required her to.
- South Africa: The Abortion and Sterilization Act, 1975 (Act No.2 of 1975) legalized abortion under certain circumstances.
- United States, Illinois: In 1975, the 79th General Assembly enacted the Illinois Abortion Law, which included a trigger law that provided that if Roe v. Wade was overturned or repealed, "the former policy of this State to prohibit abortions unless necessary for the preservation of the mother's life shall be reinstated."

==== 1976 ====
- United States: In General Electric v. Gilbert the Supreme Court ruled that it was legal for employers to exclude pregnancy-related conditions from employee sickness and accident benefits plans.
- Austria: reform to marriage law removing the husband's power to restrict his wife's employment.
- United States, Massachusetts: All people are born free and equal, and have certain natural, essential, and unalienable rights; among which may be reckoned the right of enjoying and defending their lives and liberties; that of acquiring, possessing and protecting property; in fine, that of seeking and obtaining their safety and happiness. Equality under the law shall not be denied or abridged because of sex, race, color, creed or national origin. – Massachusetts Constitution, Part 1, Article 1 (1976).
- United States: Bellotti v. Baird, 428 U.S. 132 (1976), was a United States Supreme Court case in which the Court upheld a Massachusetts law requiring parental consent to a minor's abortion, which provided that "if one or both of the [minor]'s parents refuse ... consent, consent may be obtained by order of a judge ... for good cause shown." The decision was unanimous, and the opinion of the Court was written by Justice Blackmun. The law in question "permits a minor capable of giving informed consent to obtain a court order allowing abortion without parental consultation, and further permits even a minor incapable of giving informed consent to obtain an abortion order without parental consultation where it is shown that abortion would be in her best interests."
- District of Columbia: The case Williams v. Saxbe of the U.S. District Court for the District of Columbia established sexual harassment as a form of sex discrimination when sexual advances by a male supervisor towards a female employee, if proven, would be deemed an artificial barrier to employment placed before one gender and not another.
- United States: Craig v. Boren, 429 U.S. 190 (1976), was the first case in which a majority of the United States Supreme Court determined that statutory or administrative sex classifications were subject to intermediate scrutiny under Fourteenth Amendment's the Equal Protection Clause. The Court also acknowledged that parties economically affected by regulations may challenge them "by acting as advocates of the rights of third parties who seek access to their market or function." The case specifically concerned the fact that Oklahoma passed a statute prohibiting the sale of "nonintoxicating" 3.2% beer to males under the age of 21 but allowed females over the age of 18 to purchase it. The Court held that the gender classifications made by the Oklahoma statute were unconstitutional because the statistics relied on by the state were insufficient to show a substantial relationship between the statute and the benefits intended to stem from it. This case overruled Goesaert v. Cleary.
- United States: Planned Parenthood v. Danforth, 428 U.S. 52 (1976) is a United States Supreme Court case on abortion. The plaintiffs challenged the constitutionality of a Missouri statute regulating abortion. The Court upheld the right to have an abortion, declaring unconstitutional the statute's requirement of prior written consent from a parent (in the case of a minor) or a spouse (in the case of a married woman).
- United States: In United States politics, the Hyde Amendment is a legislative provision barring the use of certain federal funds to pay for abortion unless the pregnancy arises from incest, rape, or to save the life of the mother. The Hyde Amendment is not a permanent law, but rather is a "rider" that in various forms has been routinely attached to annual appropriations bills since 1976. Legislation including the Hyde Amendment generally only restricts the use of funds allocated for the Department of Health and Human Services and primarily affects Medicaid.
- Japan: In Japan, marriage law requires that married couples share a surname because they must belong to the same koseki (household). It has been possible since 1976 for the husband to join the wife's family in certain circumstances.
- Bahrain: Article 353 was enacted; it exempts rapists (defined in Article 344) from punishment if they marry their victim.
- Ireland: Prior to the Family Home Protection Act, 1976, a husband could sell or mortgage the family home, without the consent or even knowledge of his wife.
- Northern Ireland: Sex Discrimination (Northern Ireland) Order 1976
- Pakistan: Anti-dowry law of 1976; it has proven to be unenforceable.
- Iran: In the Judicial system of Iran, until 1976, it was the man who had the right to choose the surname of his family, including his wife. However, since then, all people are allowed to choose their family names, and there has been no more imposition on behalf of the husband regarding his wife's change in surname.
- West Germany: West Germany legalized abortion in limited circumstances.
- Iran: A law "broadened access and granted an official license" for abortions to be performed in medical facilities such as clinics and hospitals.
- Italy: In 1976 in Sentenza n. 12857 del 1976, the Supreme Court of Italy ruled that "the spouse who compels the other spouse to carnal knowledge by violence or threats commits the crime of carnal violence" [meaning rape] ("commette il delitto di violenza carnale il coniuge che costringa con violenza o minaccia l'altro coniuge a congiunzione carnale").
- Canada: Morgentaler v The Queen is a 1976 decision of the Supreme Court of Canada where physician Henry Morgentaler unsuccessfully challenged the prohibition of abortion in Canada under the Criminal Code. The Court found the abortion law was appropriately passed by Parliament under the laws of federalism.
- Iceland: Iceland passed the Gender Equality Act, which prohibited gender discrimination in the workplace and in schools.
- United States Court of Appeals for the Second Circuit jurisdiction: There was a United States Court of Appeals for the Second Circuit decision indicating involuntary pregnancy discharges in the U.S. Navy violated the 5th Amendment.

==== 1977 ====
- Pakistan: During the Islamization policy of Muhammad Zia-ul-Haq from 1977 to 1988, women were highly encouraged to veil, and although no law of general compulsory veiling was introduced, all women employed by the federal government (including flight attendants and state television anchors), and university students were mandated to veil.
- Afghanistan: Full equality of men and women before the law.
- West Germany: reform of family law provides for gender equality in marriage.
- United States: Beal v. Doe, 432 U.S. 438 (1977), was a United States Supreme Court case that concerned the disbursement of federal funds in Pennsylvania. Pennsylvania statute restricted federal funding to abortion clinics. The Supreme Court ruled states are not required to treat abortion in the same manner as potential motherhood. The opinion of the Court left the central holding of the Roe v. Wade decision – abortion as a right – intact. The statute was upheld, with Justice Powell writing the majority opinion.
- United States: In Coker v. Georgia, 433 U.S. 584 (1977), the United States Supreme Court held that the death penalty for rape of an adult woman was grossly disproportionate and excessive punishment, and therefore unconstitutional under the Eighth Amendment to the United States Constitution.
- United States: Califano v. Goldfarb, 430 U.S. 199 (1977), was a decision by the United States Supreme Court, which held that the different treatment of men and women mandated by 42 U.S.C. § 402(f)(1)(D) constituted invidious discrimination against female wage earners by affording them less protection for their surviving spouses than is provided to male employees, and therefore violated the Due Process Clause of the Fifth Amendment to the United States Constitution.
- The former Yugoslav republics: Abortion was legalized in its current form October 7, 1977. Abortion is available on-demand for women whose pregnancies have not exceeded the tenth week, and in the case of risk to life or health of woman (no limit specified), or when the pregnancy has resulted from a sex offence (including rape or incest), or in case of fetal impairment up to twenty weeks. Minors under 16 require parental consent before undergoing an abortion.
- United States: Carey v. Population Services International, 431 U.S. 678 (1977), was a United States Supreme Court case in which the Court held that it was unconstitutional to prohibit anyone other than a licensed pharmacist to distribute nonprescription contraceptives to persons 16 years of age or over, to prohibit the distribution of nonprescription contraceptives by any adult to minors under 16 years of age, and to prohibit anyone, including licensed pharmacists, to advertise or display contraceptives.
- United States: Califano v. Webster, 430 U.S. 313 (1977) was a decision by the United States Supreme Court, which held that Section 215 of the Social Security Act does not violate due process by allowing women to calculate retirement benefits without including additional low-earning years, since it is an attempt to compensate for previous discrimination.
- United States: In 1977, the National Partnership for Women & Families litigated and achieved a significant victory in Barnes v. Costle, a U.S. Court of Appeals decision that held that any retaliation by a boss against an employee for rejecting sexual advances violates Title VII's prohibition against sex discrimination.
- Ireland: The Employment Equality Act of 1977 prohibited most gender discrimination in employment.
- Germany: In Germany, the marriage name law has been as such since 1977: a woman may adopt her husband's surname or a man may adopt his wife's surname. One of them may use a name combined from both surnames. The remaining single name is the "family name" (Ehename), which will be the surname of the children. If a man and woman decide to keep and use their birth names after the wedding (no combined name), they have to declare one of those names the "family name". A combined name is not possible as a family name, but, since 2005, it has been possible to have a double name as a family name if one already had a double name, and the partner adopts that name. Double names then must be hyphenated. All family members must use that double name.
- United States, Washington: The January 7, 1977 Supreme Court ruling in State of Washington v. Wanrow was an important victory for the feminist cause of gender-equality before the law. In a landmark ruling, the Washington Supreme Court, sitting en banc, declared that Yvonne Wanrow was entitled to have a jury consider her actions in the light of her "perceptions of the situation, including those perceptions which were the product of our nation's long and unfortunate history of sex discrimination". The ruling was the first in America recognizing the particular legal problems of women who defend themselves or their children from male attackers, and was again affirmed by the Washington Supreme Court in denying the prosecutor's petition for rehearing in 1979. Before the Wanrow decision, standard jury instructions asked what a "reasonably prudent man" would have done, even if the accused was a woman; the Wanrow decision set a precedent that when a woman is tried in a criminal trial the juries should ask "what a reasonably prudent woman similarly situated would have done".
- Norway: Law on the work environment that allows, among other reforms, to extend pregnancy leave and greater access to parental leave.
- Israel: Abortion in Israel had been illegal, but became legal, subject to a termination committee's approval, under the penal code of 1977.
- Germany: Until 1977 married women in Germany could not work without permission from their husbands.
- United States, New York State: Cathy Davis sued the New York State Athletic Commission (NYSAC) in 1977 because she was denied a boxing license because she was a woman, and the case was decided in her favor later that year, with the judge invalidating New York State rule number 205.15, which stated, "No woman may be licensed as a boxer or second or licensed to compete in any wrestling exhibition with men." In his opinion the judge cited the precedent set by Garrett v. New York State Athletic Commission (1975), which "found the regulation invalid under the equal protection clauses of the State and Federal Constitutions". The NYSAC filed an appeal of the ruling, but later dropped it.
- Iran: Abortion was first legalized in 1977.
- Slovenia: Slovenia, then a republic within federal Yugoslavia, criminalized marital rape in 1977.
- Zimbabwe: Zimbabwe's current abortion law, the Termination of Pregnancy Act, was enacted by Rhodesia's white minority government in 1977. The law permits abortion if the pregnancy endangers the life of the woman or threatens to permanently impair her physical health, if the child may be born with serious physical or mental defects, or if the fetus was conceived as a result of rape or incest.
- New Zealand: The Government amended the Crimes Act 1961 to allow abortion within the 20 weeks gestation period. After 20 weeks, abortion was permitted on the grounds of saving the mother's life and preventing serious permanent injury to her mental and physical health.

==== 1978 ====
- Luxembourg: Abortion in Luxembourg was liberalized on 15 November 1978.
- Greece: Partial legalization of abortion in Greece was passed in Law 821 in 1978 that provided for the legal termination of a pregnancy, with no time limitation, in the event of a threat to the health or life of the woman. This law also allowed for termination up to the 12th week of pregnancy due to psychiatric indications and to the 20th week due to fetal pathology.
- Italy: Abortion in Italy became legal in May 1978.
- Austria: reform to family law providing gender equality in parental rights over children, and ownership of property and assets, ending the legal authority of the husband.
- Afghanistan: Mandatory literacy and education of all females.
- Dominican Republic: Abolition of the requirement that married women must have their husbands' permission to initiate judicial proceedings.
- 'Rhodesia'-Zimbabwe: Women gain the right to stand for election.
- Portugal: A new family law providing for gender equality between husband and wife comes into force.
- United States: Dothard v. Rawlinson, 433 U.S. 321 (1977), was the first United States Supreme Court case which the bona fide occupational qualifications (BFOQ) defense was used. The court held that Under Title VII of the Civil Rights Act of 1964, an employer may not, in the absence of business necessity, set height and weight restrictions which have a disproportionately adverse effect on one gender. However, on the issue of whether women could fill close contact jobs in all male maximum security prisons the Court ruled 6–3 that the BFOQ defense was legitimate in this case. The reason for this finding is that female prison guards were more vulnerable to male sexual attack than male prison guards.
- Canada: Bliss v Canada (AG) 1 S.C.R. 183 is a famous Supreme Court of Canada decision on equality rights for women under the Canadian Bill of Rights. The Court held that women were not entitled to benefits denied to them by the Unemployment Insurance Act during a certain period of pregnancy. This case has since become the prime example demonstrating the inadequacies of the Canadian Bill of Rights in protecting individuals' rights. Later, Brooks v Canada Safeway Ltd [1989] 1 S.C.R. 1219 was a leading Supreme Court of Canada decision on employer discrimination of pregnant employees. The Court found that Safeway violated the provincial Human Rights Act by failing to provide equal compensation for those who missed work due to pregnancy. This decision overturned the controversial case of Bliss v Canada (AG).
- United States: The Pregnancy Discrimination Act of 1978 is a United States federal statute. It amended Title VII of the Civil Rights Act of 1964 to "prohibit sex discrimination on the basis of pregnancy." The Act covers discrimination "on the basis of pregnancy, childbirth, or related medical conditions." It only applies to employers with 15 or more employees. Employers are exempt from providing medical coverage for elective abortions – except in the case that the mother's life is threatened – but are required to provide disability and sick leave for women who are recovering from an abortion.
- United States: Judge John Sirica ruled the law banning Navy women from ships to be unconstitutional in the case Owens v. Brown. That same year, Congress approved a change to Title 10 USC Section 6015 to permit the Navy to assign women to fill sea duty billets on support and noncombatant ships.
- United States: The Mann Act originally made it a felony to engage in interstate or foreign commerce transport of "any woman or girl for the purpose of prostitution or debauchery, or for any other immoral purpose". In 1978, Congress updated the Mann Act's definition of "transportation" and added protections against commercial sexual exploitation for minors.
- United States: The federal lawsuit, Melissa Ludtke and Time, Inc., Plaintiffs, v. Bowie Kuhn, Commissioner of Baseball et al. (1978) is credited with giving equal access to Major League Baseball locker rooms to women sports reporters. In 1977, Ludtke sued the baseball commission on the basis that her 14th amendment rights were violated when she was denied access to the New York Yankees clubhouse while reporting on the 1977 World Series. She won the lawsuit. The United States District Court for the Southern District of New York stated her fourteenth amendment right was violated since the New York Yankees clubhouse was controlled by New York City. That court also stated that her fundamental right to pursue a career was violated based on her sex.
- Norway: A law was passed which provides for abortion on request in the first 12 weeks of pregnancy. Abortions after the end of the 12th week up to 18 weeks of pregnancy may be granted, by application, under special circumstances, such as the mother's health or her social situation; if the fetus is in great danger of severe medical complications; or if the woman has become pregnant while under-age, or after sexual abuse. After the 18th week, the reasons for terminating a pregnancy must be extremely weighty. An abortion will not be granted after viability. Minor girls under 16 years of age need parental consent, although in some circumstances, this may be overridden.
- United States: The Edmunds–Tucker Act disincorporated both the LDS Church and the Perpetual Emigration Fund on the grounds that they fostered polygamy. The act prohibited the practice of polygamy and punished it with a fine of from $500 to $800 and imprisonment of up to five years. It dissolved the corporation of the church and directed the confiscation by the federal government of all church properties valued over a limit of $50,000. The act was enforced by the U.S. Marshal and a host of deputies.

The act: -Disincorporated the LDS Church and the Perpetual Emigrating Fund Company, with assets to be used for public schools in the Territory.
-Required an anti-polygamy oath for prospective voters, jurors and public officials.
-Annulled territorial laws allowing illegitimate children to inherit.
-Required civil marriage licenses (to aid in the prosecution of polygamy).
-Abrogated the common law spousal privilege for polygamists, thus requiring wives to testify against their husbands.
-Disenfranchised women (who had been enfranchised by the Territorial legislature in 1870).
– Replaced local judges (including the previously powerful Probate Court judges) with federally appointed judges.
– Abolished the office of Territorial superintendent of district schools, granting the supreme court of the Territory of Utah the right to appoint a commissioner of schools. Also called for the prohibition of the use of sectarian books and for the collection of statistics of the number of so-called gentiles and Mormons attending and teaching in the schools.
In 1890 the U.S. Supreme Court upheld the seizure of Church property under the Edmunds–Tucker Act in Late Corporation of the Church of Jesus Christ of Latter-Day Saints v. United States. The act was repealed in 1978.

- United States, Hawaii: Equality of rights under the law shall not be denied or abridged by the State on account of sex. The legislature shall have the power to enforce, by appropriate legislation, the provisions of this section. – Hawaii Constitution, Article I, §3 (1978).
- Spain: The 1978 Spanish constitution gave men and women equality under the law, effectively ending the Franco regime's system of guardianship for single women. For married women, this system would remain in place after the end of the transition period.
- Spain: Spain allowed the sons of female dynasts but not women themselves to inherit the throne of Spain in 1947–1978.
- New Zealand: The Third National Government passed the Contraception, Sterilisation, and Abortion Act 1977 (CS&A Act 1977) on 15 December 1978, which established the legal framework for abortion in New Zealand. Under the CS&A Act, a woman seeking abortion had to see their doctor and the two medical consultants, who would assess the mental and physical grounds for carrying out an abortion. A surgeon would also be needed to perform an abortion. Counselling was also made available to women seeking an abortion. The CS&A Act also established an Abortion Supervisory Committee to regulate the certifying consultants responsible for permitting abortions. The Act also required district health boards to fund abortions.
- New Zealand: In 1978, the Government amended the Crimes Act 1961 to permit abortion on the grounds of saving the mother's life, mental health, and physical health; foetal abnormality within the 20 weeks gestation period; and incest or sexual intercourse with guardians and family members.
- India: The minimum legal age for marriage was increased to 18 for females (and 21 for males) in 1978.

==== 1979 ====
- Saudi Arabia: It became mandatory for women to veil in public.
- Finland: The time limit for legal abortion was lowered from 16 to 12 weeks of pregnancy in 1979.
- Brazil: It was illegal for women to play soccer in Brazil from 1941 to 1979.
- Chile: Legal majority for married women.
- West Germany: reform to parental rights law giving equal legal rights to the mother and the father, abolishing the legal authority of the father.
- International: The Convention on the Elimination of all Forms of Discrimination Against Women (CEDAW), an international treaty, was adopted in 1979 by the United Nations General Assembly.
- United States: Bellotti v. Baird, 443 U.S. 622 (1979) is a United States Supreme Court case that ruled that teenagers do not have to secure parental consent to obtain an abortion. The Court, 8–1, elaborates on its parental consent decision of 1976. It implies that states may be able to require a pregnant, unmarried minor to obtain parental consent to an abortion so long as the state law provides an alternative procedure to parental approval, such as letting the minor seek a state judge's approval instead. This plurality opinion declined to fully extend the right to seek and obtain an abortion, granted to adult women in Roe v. Wade, to minors. The Court rejected this extension to minors by placing emphasis on the especially vulnerable nature of children, their "inability to make critical decisions in an informed and mature manner; and the importance of the parental role in child rearing."
- United States: The Supreme Court ruled in Califano v. Westcott that two-parent families with unemployed mothers are entitled to AFDC benefits.
- United States: Colautti v. Franklin, 439 U.S. 379 (1979) was a United States Supreme Court abortion rights case, which held void for vagueness part of Pennsylvania's 1974 Abortion Control Act. The section in question was the following:

(a) Every person who performs or induces an abortion shall prior thereto have made a determination based on his experience, judgment or professional competence that the fetus is not viable, and if the determination is that the fetus is viable or if there is sufficient reason to believe that the fetus may be viable, shall exercise that degree of professional skill, care and diligence to preserve the life and health of the fetus which such person would be required to exercise in order to preserve the life and health of any fetus intended to be born and not aborted and the abortion technique employed shall be that which would provide the best opportunity for the fetus to be aborted alive so long as a different technique would not be necessary in order to preserve the life or health of the mother.

Doctors who failed to adhere to the provisions of this section were liable to civil and criminal prosecution "as would pertain to him had the fetus been a child who was intended to be born and not aborted." Franklin and others sued, arguing that the provision was both vague and overbroad. In a 6–3 decision written by Roe author Harry Blackmun, the Supreme Court agreed, finding that requiring a determination "if... the fetus is viable or if there is sufficient reason to believe the fetus may be viable" was insufficient and impermissibly vague guidance for physicians who might face criminal liability if a jury disagrees with their judgment.

- United States: Personnel Administrator of Massachusetts v. Feeney, 442 U.S. 256 (1979), was a case heard by the Supreme Court of the United States. The decision upheld the constitutionality of a state law, giving hiring preference to veterans over nonveterans.

The law was challenged as violating the Equal Protection Clause of the Fourteenth Amendment to the United States Constitution by a woman, who argued that the law discriminated on the basis of sex because so few women were veterans.

- United States: Orr v. Orr, 440 U.S. 268 (1979), was a United States Supreme Court case that held that Alabama statutes that imposed alimony obligations on husbands but not on wives violated the equal protection clause of the Fourteenth Amendment.
- Ireland: The Health (Family Planning) Act, 1979 allowed the sale of contraceptives in Ireland, upon presentation of a prescription.
- Pakistan: In Pakistan, the Hudood Ordinances of 1979 subsumed prosecution of rape under the category of zina, making rape extremely difficult to prove and exposing the victims to jail sentences for admitting illicit intercourse. Although these laws were amended in 2006, they still blur the legal distinction between rape and consensual sex.
- United States: Duren v. Missouri, 439 U.S. 357 (1979), was a United States Supreme Court case in which the Supreme Court ruled that the exemption on request of women from jury service under Missouri law, resulting in an average of less than 15% women on jury venires in the forum county, violated the "fair-cross-section" requirement of the Sixth Amendment as made applicable to the States by the Fourteenth.
- Norway: Law on Gender Equality (implemented in 1979). To ensure compliance, an ombudsman responsible for enforcing the law on gender equality is created along with a complaints committee for equality. Norway is the first country to adopt such means. Even if the sanctions were limited, the mediator had a genuine moral authority.
- Belgium: In 1979, the Brussels Court of Appeal recognized marital rape and found that a husband who used serious violence to coerce his wife into having sex against her wishes was guilty of the criminal offense of rape. The logic of the court was that, although the husband did have a 'right' to sex with his wife, he could not use violence to claim it, as Belgian laws did not allow people to obtain their rights by violence.
- United States: Cannon v. University of Chicago, 441 U.S. 677 (1979), was a United States Supreme Court case which interpreted Congressional silence in the face of earlier interpretations of similar laws to determine that Title IX of the Higher Education Act provides an implied cause of action.
- United States, California: A lawsuit made California change its boxing regulations, which had limited women boxers to no more than four rounds.
- Cuba: Legislation was passed to make abortion more easily accessible by Cuban women.

=== 1980s ===
1980

- United States, Kentucky: In 1974, Kentucky adopted a law preventing public hospitals from performing abortion procedures except to protect the life of the mother. The law was later ruled unconstitutional by the Sixth Circuit Court of Appeals, but the state legislature passed a new version of the law in 1980.
- Belize: Abortion in Belize is governed by sections 108–110 of the Criminal Code (enacted December 1980). Abortion is considered a criminal offense except when performed by a registered medical practitioner under certain conditions. The sentence for performing an illegal abortion in Belize is life imprisonment.

Abortion is permitted under the following circumstances:

- To protect the: life of the mother
- To protect the physical or mental health of the mother or any existing children of her family
- If there is substantial risk that the child will be severely handicapped

In addition, the law states that "account may be taken of the pregnant woman's actual or reasonably foreseeable environment", suggesting that abortions can be performed on socioeconomic grounds. Belize does not provide an explicit exception for pregnancies that are the result of rape or incest.

- Sweden: Gender discrimination forbidden by law.
- Sweden: The Swedish Act of Succession was changed, so that the rule of succession, which had been agnatic primogeniture (male succession only), was changed in favor of absolute primogeniture (eldest child regardless of sex).
- United States: Shyamala Rajender v. University of Minnesota was a landmark class action lawsuit dealing with sexual discrimination at an American university. The case was filed on September 5, 1973, by Shyamala Rajender, an assistant professor of chemistry at the University of Minnesota. Rajender accused the university of engaging in employment discrimination on the basis of sex and national origin after she was turned down for a tenure-track position despite being recommended for the position by several university committees. The suit was certified as a class action by the United States District Court for the District of Minnesota in 1978. After eleven weeks of trial, the suit was settled in 1980 by a consent decree. Rajender received $100,000 and Judge Miles Lord enjoined the university from discriminating against women on the basis of sex. Rajender's attorneys were awarded approximately $2 million in fees.
- United States: Harris v. McRae, 448 U.S. 297 (1980), was a case in which the Supreme Court of the United States held that States that participated in Medicaid were not required to fund medically necessary abortions for which federal reimbursement was unavailable as a result of the Hyde Amendment, which restricted the use of federal funds for abortion. The Court also held that the funding restrictions of the Hyde Amendment did not violate either the Fifth Amendment or the Establishment Clause of the First Amendment.
- United States: In William v. Zbaraz, the United States Supreme Court upheld that states could constitutionally make their own versions of the anti-abortion Hyde Amendment, and that states/the federal government have no statutory or constitutional obligation to fund medically necessary abortions.
- Turkey: The hijab was banned in universities and public buildings until late 2013 – this included libraries or government buildings. The ban was first in place during the 1980 military coup, but the law was strengthened in 1997.
- United States: Alexander v. Yale, 631 F.2d 178 (2d Cir. 1980), was the first use of Title IX in charges of sexual harassment against an educational institution. It further established that sexual harassment of female students could be considered sex discrimination, and was thus illegal.
- The Netherlands: The Netherlands legalized abortion in limited circumstances.
- Israel: The Israeli Supreme Court affirmed that marital rape is a crime in a 1980 decision, citing law based on the Talmud (at least 6th century).
- Colombia: Prior to the 1980 Penal Code, the law concerning abortion provided for reduced sentences, of 3–6 months (5–10 months if the abortion was successful), in the case of "honest women of good reputation" who received an abortion to "conceal their frailty" (aborto honoris causa). The 1980 Penal Code, in articles 343 to 345, removed the aborto honoris causa and adopted penalties and attenuating circumstances which would be largely retained by the current penal code, adopted in 2000. From the 1980 Penal Code: "ARTICLE 343. ABORTION. The woman who causes her abortion or allows another to cause it, shall be in prison for one to three years. [Next paragraph] The same sanction shall be subject to who, with the consent of the woman, performs the act provided for in the preceding paragraph."
- Puerto Rico: The Puerto Rican Supreme Court oversaw the case of the People of Puerto Rico v. Pablo Duarte Mendoza in 1980. Their ruling was effectively a territory specific answer to a question already answered by the US Supreme Court in the earlier Roe v. Wade. The 1980 cases involved Dr. Pablo Duarte Mendoza being charged in 1973 for allegedly performing an illegal abortion on a 16-year-old girl in violation of Puerto Rico's 1937 abortion laws. Duarte was given a sentence of two to four years around the time that the 1937 law was being repealed and replaced with a law that provided women with greater access to abortion services. Duarte appealed the sentence to the Puerto Rico Supreme Court, which overturned the sentence given by the Puerto Rico Superior Court, citing the needs of the doctor to be able to consider a woman's health issues in the first trimester, with the women's health being a primary factor in whether or not an abortion should occur. The Supreme Court said that the issues of the health of the pregnant woman trumped any concern about her age.

1981

- Iran: In Iran, since 1981, after the 1979 Islamic Revolution, the hijab has become compulsory. All women are required to wear loose-fitting clothing and a headscarf in public.
- Hong Kong: On 17 February 1981, the Legislative Council voted 40 to 7 to pass the controversial abortion bill and legalised abortion in Hong Kong.
- United States: The Supreme Court of the United States determined in County of Washington v. Gunther that the Bennett Amendment explicitly incorporated only limited defenses to unequal pay due to sex and did not otherwise bar suits based on a comparison of payment for different jobs. Nevertheless, it has continued to be used to bar comparable worth suits in lower courts.
- Ireland: Prior to 1981, criminal conversation existed in Ireland, and meant a man could sue anyone who slept with his wife, regardless of whether the wife consented, except that if the couple was already separated the husband could only sue if the separation was caused by the person he was suing.
- Spain: Abolition of the requirement that married women must have their husbands' permission to initiate judicial proceedings.
- Spain: Law 11/1981 made men and women equal in marriage. It ended a system under which the husband was in charge of conjugal property. Women could work without the consent of their husband, apply for a passport, open a bank account and get a drivers license. The new regulations were in line with United Nations guidelines. Children, on turning 18, now had a legal option to choose whether their father's or mother's surname came first. If a family did not exercise an option to change the order of the names in their surname, the law defaulted to the father's surname as the first.
- Italy: There was a repeal of the law which provided for mitigated punishment in case of honor killings; prior to 1981, the law read: Art. 587: He who causes the death of a spouse, daughter, or sister upon discovering her in illegitimate carnal relations and in the heat of passion caused by the offence to his honour or that of his family will be sentenced to three to seven years. The same sentence shall apply to whom, in the above circumstances, causes the death of the person involved in illegitimate carnal relations with his spouse, daughter, or sister.
- Italy: Italy repealed Article 544 of the Penal Code that allowed male rapists of women to marry their victims to avoid punishment.
- United States: Kirchberg v. Feenstra, 450 U.S. 455 (1981), was a United States Supreme Court case in which the Court held a Louisiana Head and Master law, which gave sole control of marital property to the husband, unconstitutional.
- United States: H. L. v. Matheson, 450 U.S. 398 (1981) was a United States Supreme Court abortion rights case, according to which a state may require a doctor to inform a teenaged girl's parents before performing an abortion or face criminal penalty.
- United States: Rostker v. Goldberg, 453 U.S. 57 (1981), was a decision of the United States Supreme Court holding that the practice of requiring only men to register for the draft was constitutional. After extensive hearings, floor debate and committee sessions on the matter, the United States Congress enacted the law, as it had previously been, to apply to men only. Several attorneys, including Robert L. Goldberg, subsequently challenged the gender distinction as unconstitutional. (The named defendant is Bernard D. Rostker, Director of the Selective Service System.) In a 6–3 decision, the Supreme Court held that this gender distinction was not a violation of the equal protection component of the due process clause, and that the Act would stand as passed.
- United States: Bundy v. Jackson, 641 F.2d 934 (C.A. D.C. 1981), was a D.C. Circuit opinion, written by Judge Skelly Wright, that held that workplace sexual harassment could constitute employment discrimination under the Civil Rights Act of 1964.
- United States: Michael M. v. Superior Court of Sonoma County, 450 U.S. 464 (1981), was a United States Supreme Court case over the issue of gender bias in statutory rape laws. The petitioner argued that the statutory rape law discriminated based on gender and was unconstitutional. The court ruled otherwise. Sexual intercourse entails a higher risk for women than men. Thus, the court found the law just in targeting men as the only possible perpetrators of statutory rape.
- Tunisia: Women with headscarves are banned from schools and government buildings, and those who insist on wearing them face losing their jobs.
- Québec, Canada: Prior to 1981 in Québec, married women would traditionally go by their husbands' surname in daily life, but their maiden name remained their legal name. Since the passage of a 1981 provincial law intended to promote gender equality as outlined in the Québec Charter of Rights, no change may be made to a person's name without the authorization of the registrar of civil status or the authorization of the court. Newlyweds who wish to change their names upon marriage must therefore go through the same procedure as those changing their names for other reasons. The registrar of civil status may authorize a name change if: 1) the name the person generally uses does not correspond to the name on their birth certificate, 2) the name is of foreign origin or too difficult to pronounce or write in its original form, or 3) the name invites ridicule or has become infamous. This law does not make it legal for a woman to immediately change her name upon marriage, as marriage is not listed among the reasons for a name change.
- Ontario, Canada: The human rights code of the government of Ontario was amended to exclude membership in athletic organizations, access to the facilities and services of recreational clubs, and participation in athletic activities from its provisions regarding sex equality.
- United States: The version of the Hyde Amendment in force from 1981 until 1993 prohibited the use of federal funds for abortions "except where the life of the mother would be endangered if the fetus were carried to term."
- Norway: The Labour Code which dates from 1935 was revised regularly. Review of 1981: Provided equal treatment between men and women in hiring and salary.

1982

- Panama: Abortion in Panama is illegal except in instances that the pregnancy is life-threatening or the health of the woman is at risk, or if the pregnancy is the result of rape or incest. A penal code was set in place on September 22, 1982, which penalized illegal abortions. This code is still active today.
- Ireland: In Murphy v Attorney General [1982] IR 241, a married couple successfully challenged the constitutionality of ss. 192–198 of the Income Tax Act 1967, which had declared the income of a married woman who was living with her husband was counted as her husband's income for tax purposes, rather than being counted as her own.
- Zimbabwe: Abolition of the requirement that married women must have their husbands' permission to initiate judicial proceedings.
- United States: Mississippi University for Women v. Hogan, 458 U.S. 718 (1982) was a case decided 5–4 by the Supreme Court of the United States. The court held that the single-sex admissions policy of the Mississippi University for Women violated the Equal Protection Clause of the Fourteenth Amendment to the United States Constitution.
- Sweden: In 1982, Sweden was the first western country in the world to explicitly prohibit genital mutilation. It is punishable by up to ten years in prison, and in 1999 the Government extended the law to include procedures performed abroad. General child protection laws could also be used.
- France: Since 1982, much of the costs of abortions are taken in charge by the French social security system.
- United States: Chrapliwy v. Uniroyal, Inc., 670 F.2d 760 (7th Cir. 1982) is a US labor law decision of the U.S. Seventh Circuit Court of Appeals concerning the award of attorney's fees in a discrimination lawsuit. The facts of the case involved allegedly discriminatory practices in violation of Title VII of the Civil Rights Act of 1964. The litigants of the case settled in favor of the plaintiffs, but brought the issue of reasonable attorney's fees to the district court. Chrapliwy v. Uniroyal, Inc. found that the reasonable attorney's fees are recoverable for time spent persuading the Federal Government to debar a defendant from its contracts when engaging in discriminatory practices. Reasonable attorney's fees are to be determined by the plaintiff's attorneys' rates, not by customary rates of attorneys in the locality in which the district court sits. Reasonable attorney's fees for risks of litigation and quality or representation are recoverable.
- New York City, United States: After Brenda Berkman's requests for a firefighting test that was fairer for women were ignored, she filed an ultimately successful class-action lawsuit: Brenda Berkman, et al. v. The City of New York (1982). A new test was created in which standards were changed so the test was job-related and Brenda with 40 other women passed to enter the fire academy in 1982. (See Brenda Berkman, et al. v. The City of New York, CV-79-1813, 536 F. Supp. 177 (E.D.N.Y. 1982), aff'd Berkman v. City of New York, 705 F.2d 584 (2d Cir. 1983.))
- Abortion in Honduras is completely prohibited under any circumstance, and has been constitutionally prohibited since 1982.
- United States, United States Court of Appeals for the Ninth Circuit jurisdiction: The Pacific Press Publishing Association lost an appeal in a case against the Equal Employment Opportunity Commission; the United States Court of Appeals for the Ninth Circuit denied that the press could obtain a Title VII exemption to the employment code that would allow them to treat female and male employees differently.
- Indonesia: In 1982 the veil was temporarily banned in schools to prevent its introduction in Indonesia.

1983

- United States, Kentucky: The 1981 unlawful abortion conviction of a Wayne County, Kentucky, man put the issue of abortion before the Kentucky Supreme Court. In 1983, the court ruled that the seven-month-old fetus killed by the man during an attack on his wife could not be defined as a person under the Model Penal Code.
- United Kingdom: In the case Gill and Coote v El Vino Co Ltd, Tess Gill and Anna Coote successfully challenged El Vino's ban on women being served at the bar and drinking there rather than having their drinks brought to them at a table; the ban was held to be a breach of the Sex Discrimination Act 1975.
- Greece: new family law, which provides for gender equality in marriage, abolishes dowry, and liberalizes the divorce law. Since this law was enacted in 1983, one aspect of it is that women in Greece are required to keep their birth names for their whole life.
- Australia: abolition of the requirement that the husband must authorize the application of a married woman for a passport.
- United States: City of Akron v. Akron Center for Reproductive Health, 462 U.S. 416 (1983), was a case in which the United States Supreme Court affirmed its abortion rights jurisprudence. The case, decided June 15, 1983, struck down an Ohio abortion law with several provisions.
- Ireland: The Eighth Amendment of the Constitution of Ireland, which recognized "the unborn" as having a right to life equal to that of "the mother", was passed.
- Iran: In 1983, the Islamic Consultative Assembly decided that women who do not cover their hair in public will be punished with 74 lashes.
- India: The anti-dowry Section 498a of Indian Penal Code was enacted in 1983.
- Qatar: A law formalized in 1983 states that abortions may be legally performed on pregnancies of less than four months duration if the pregnancy were to cause serious harm to the mother's health if continued, or if there was evidence that the child would be born with untreatable mental or physical deficiencies and both parents consented to the abortion.
- United States, Philadelphia County, Philadelphia: After 139 years of existence as an all-male public high school, Central's all-male policy was challenged by Susan Vorchheimer, who wished to be admitted to Central. On August 7, 1975, U.S. District Court Judge Clarence C. Newcomer ruled that Central must admit academically qualified girls starting in the fall term of 1975. The decision was appealed, and the Third Circuit Court ruled that Central had the right to retain its present status. The case eventually reached the U.S. Supreme Court that, on April 19, 1977, upheld the Third Circuit Court's verdict by a 4 to 4 vote with one abstention. That Supreme Court case was called Vorchheimer v. School Dist. of Philadelphia. However, in August 1983, Judge William M. Marutani of the Philadelphia County Court of Common Pleas, ruled that the single-sex admission policy was unconstitutional. The Board of Education voted not to appeal the legal decision, thereby admitting girls to Central High School. In September 1983, the first six girls, all seniors, were admitted.
- United States, Washington: Washington removed its marital exemptions for first-degree rape and second-degree rape in 1983.
- Barbados: The Barbados parliament passed the Medical Termination of Pregnancy Act, decriminalizing abortion.
- Netherlands: The Netherlands established absolute cognatic primogeniture instead of male preference primogeniture by law in 1983.
- Turkey: In 1983, abortion was legalized in Turkey (it was passed in 1982 during a military government).

1984

- Netherlands: gender equality in family law, abolishing the stipulation that the husband's opinion prevailed over the wife's regarding issues such as decisions on children's education and the domicile of the family.
- Peru: Legal majority for married women.
- South Africa: The Matrimonial Property Act of 1984 abolished the marital power prospectively (i.e. for marriages contracted after the act came into force) but not for marriages between black people.
- Switzerland: Abolition of the requirement that married women must have their husbands' permission to initiate judicial proceedings.
- United States: The U.S. Supreme Court's 1984 ruling Grove City College v. Bell held that Title IX applied only to those programs receiving direct federal aid. The case reached the Supreme Court when Grove City College disagreed with the Department of Education's assertion that it was required to comply with Title IX. Grove City College was not a federally funded institution; however, they did accept students who were receiving Basic Educational Opportunity Grants through a Department of Education program. The Department of Education's stance was that, because some of its students were receiving federal grants, the school was receiving federal assistance and Title IX applied to it. The Court decided that since Grove City College was only receiving federal funding through the grant program, only that program had to be in compliance. The ruling was a major victory for those opposed to Title IX, as it made many institutions' sports programs outside of the rule of Title IX and, thus, reduced the scope of Title IX.
- United States: Roberts v. United States Jaycees, 468 U.S. 609 (1984), was an opinion of the Supreme Court of the United States overturning the United States Court of Appeals for the Eighth Circuit's application of a Minnesota antidiscrimination law, which had permitted the United States Junior Chamber (Jaycees) to exclude women from full membership.
- United States: People v. Pointer was a criminal law case from the California Court of Appeal, First District, which is significant because the trial judge included in his sentencing a prohibition on the defendant becoming pregnant during her period of probation. The appellate court held that such a prohibition was outside the bounds of a judge's sentencing authority. The case was remanded for resentencing to undo the overly broad prohibition against conception.
- Portugal: The Socialist Party passed a law that allowed abortion in specific cases: in the case of mental or physical health reasons, rape and sexual crimes, and fetal malformation. This was the first time, in Portugal, that a law exempted abortion from punishment in certain situations.
- United States: In Tallon v. Liberty Hose Co. No. 1 (Pa. Super. Ct. 1984), a case concerning sex discrimination, it was ruled that a volunteer fire department may be held liable under section 1983 for violating a plaintiff's constitutional rights.
- Netherlands: Abortion in the Netherlands was fully legalized on November 1, 1984, allowing abortions to be done on-demand up to the 24th week of the pregnancy.
- United States: In Hishon v. King & Spaulding (1984), a case in which a woman claimed that her failure to be promoted to partner at a law firm was due to her gender, the Supreme Court ruled that Title VII of the Civil Rights Act of 1964 bans discrimination by employers in the context of any contractual employer/employee relationship, including but not limited to law partnerships.
- United States, New York: In the 1984 New York Court of Appeals case of People v. Liberta, judge Sol Wachtler stated that "a marriage license should not be viewed as a license for a husband to forcibly rape his wife with impunity. A married woman has the same right to control her own body as does an unmarried woman".
- Australia: The Sex Discrimination Act 1984 is an Act of the Parliament of Australia which prohibits discrimination on the basis of sex, marital or relationship status, actual or potential pregnancy, sexual orientation, gender identity, intersex status or breastfeeding in a range of areas of public life. These areas include work, accommodation, education, the provision of goods, facilities and services, the activities of clubs and the administration of Commonwealth laws and programs. The Australian Human Rights Commission investigates alleged breaches of the Act. The office of Sex Discrimination Commissioner, created in 1984 alongside the Act, is a specialist commissioner within the AHRC.
- United States, California: In July 1984, the California Courts of Appeal overturned Superior Court of Los Angeles County judge Eli Chernow, ruling that fetuses could not be buried as human remains in the Los Angeles fetus disposal scandal, which was a win for pro-choice groups and feminists.

1985

- Finland: A 1985 bill allowed abortion up to 20 weeks of pregnancy for underage girls and up to the 24th week if an amniocentesis or ultrasound found serious impairment in the fetus.
- France: A new reform in 1985 abolishes the stipulation that the father has the sole power to administer the children's property.
- United Kingdom: The Prohibition of Female Circumcision Act 1985.
- United States: The "Mexico City Policy" came into effect, and it directed the United States Agency for International Development (USAID) to withhold USAID funds from NGOs that use non-USAID funds to engage in a wide range of activities, including providing advice, counseling, or information regarding abortion, or lobbying a foreign government to legalize or make abortion available.
- United States, Indianapolis, Indiana: American Booksellers Ass'n, Inc. v. Hudnut, 771 F.2d 323 (7th Cir. 1985), aff'd mem., 475 U.S. 1001 (1986), was a 1985 court case that successfully challenged the constitutionality of the Antipornography Civil Rights Ordinance, as enacted in Indianapolis, Indiana the previous year. Judge Easterbrook, writing for the court, held that the ordinance's definition and prohibition of "pornography" was unconstitutional. The ordinance did not refer to the prurient interest, as required of obscenity statutes by the Supreme Court in Miller v. California, 413 U.S. 15 (1973). Rather, the ordinance defined pornography by reference to its portrayal of women, which the court held was unconstitutional, as "the First Amendment means that government has no power to restrict expression because of its message [or] its ideas."
- Japan: The Nationality Law was amended to allow Japanese mothers to pass Japanese nationality to their children.
- Ireland: The Health (Family Planning) (Amendment) Act, 1985 allowed the sale of condoms and spermicides to people over 18 in Ireland without having to present a prescription.
- Norway: The Labour Code which dates from 1935 was revised regularly. Revision 1985: creation of a delegate for equality between men and women in business.
- Spain: In the Organic Law 9/1985 adopted on 5 July 1985, induced abortion was legalized in three cases: serious risk to the physical or mental health of the pregnant woman (therapeutic justification), rape (criminal justification), and malformations or defects, physical or mental, in the fetus (eugenic justification).
- Spain: Starting in 1941 and until 1985, girls were taken to centers run by nuns as part of the state's objective of rehabilitating the "fallen". Some of these girls were dropped off by parents who no longer wanted to care of them, as in the case of Raquel Castillo. Some girls were put into state custody because they were denounced by family members. Marian Torralbo was denounced by her brother, a member of Acción Católica, for partying. All were incapacitated without a trial. Women could not leave in many cases until they were 25-years-old, the age when they were legally adult women. The law changed in 1985 in regard to girls taken into state custody, as it no longer allowed minors to be placed under the control of the state for their own protection.
- American Samoa: A September 20, 1985 directive from the American Samoa Attorney General stated that elective abortions are unconstitutional and that no such procedures can occur at public hospitals.
- Northern Mariana Islands: Article 12's May 1986 supplement to the Northern Marianas Constitution said, "The abortion of the unborn child during the mother's pregnancy is prohibited by the Commonwealth of the Northern Mariana Islands, except as provided by law." This measure was adopted in 1985.

1986

- Ontario, Canada: In Blainey v Ontario Hockey Association (1986) 54 O.R. (2d) 513, the Court of Appeal for Ontario held that Section 19(2) of the Ontario Human Rights Code, which stated, "The right under section 1 to equal treatment with respect to services and facilities is not infringed where membership in an athletic organization or participation in an athletic activity is restricted to persons of the same sex", was unconstitutional, and struck down the provision.
- United States, Kentucky: The 1986 Kentucky General Assembly passed legislation requiring parental consent for minors seeking abortions. The law required the consent of only the custodial parent if the parents did not live together, and also allowed the minor to petition a district or circuit court for permission.
- Singapore: In 1986 mandatory pre-abortion counselling was introduced. This applied to all women who were Singapore citizens or PRs, had two or fewer children, or had passed the Primary School Leaving Examination. This was amended in 2015 to apply to all women.
- Czechoslovakia: In 1957, abortions were legalized in Czechoslovakia, although with restrictions that depended on the current policy of the government. In 1986, the restrictions were lifted.
- American Samoa: § 46.3904 passed in 1986 said that no physician or hospital employee can be compelled to participate in an abortion procedure if doing so goes against their conscience. Further, such refusals are immune to criminal, administrative or disciplinary action.
- American Samoa: American Samoa legal code sections passed in 1986 declare that the only persons who can perform a legal abortion in American Samoa are licensed American Samoan physicians.
- American Samoa: American Samoa legal code sections 46.3902 and 46.3903, which were adopted in 1986, made any attempt to terminate a pregnancy except in the case of saving the physical or mental health of the mother a crime.
- Djibouti: Women gained the right to stand for election.
- District of Columbia, United States: Women gained the right to go topless.
- United States: Thornburgh v. American College of Obstetricians and Gynecologists, 476 U.S. 747 (1986) was a United States Supreme Court case involving a challenge to Pennsylvania's Abortion Control Act of 1982. The American College of Obstetricians and Gynecologists sought an injunction to all enforcement of the Pennsylvania law. Although the law in question was similar to the one in City of Akron v. Akron Center for Reproductive Health, in Thornburgh the Reagan administration asked the justices to overrule Roe v. Wade. Justice Blackmun's opinion for the court rejected this position, reaffirming Roe.
- United States: Meritor Savings Bank v. Vinson, 477 U.S. 57 (1986), marked the United States Supreme Court's recognition of certain forms of sexual harassment as a violation of Civil Rights Act of 1964 Title VII, and established the standards for analyzing whether conduct was unlawful and when an employer would be liable.
- United States: The Mann Act originally made it a felony to engage in interstate or foreign commerce transport of "any woman or girl for the purpose of prostitution or debauchery, or for any other immoral purpose". In 1978, Congress updated the Mann Act's definition of "transportation" and added protections against commercial sexual exploitation for minors. In 1986 it was further amended to replace the ambiguous "debauchery" and "any other immoral purpose" with the more specific "any sexual activity for which* any person can be charged with a criminal offense" as well as to make it gender-neutral.
- Japan: The Women's Bureau of the Ministry of Labor enacted an Equal Employment Opportunity Law, the first "gender equality law formulated mainly by Japanese women."
- Ireland: The Domicile and Recognition of Foreign Divorces Act, 1986, abolished the dependent domicile of the wife.
- India: The Indecent Representation of Women (Prohibition) Act is an Act of the Parliament of India which was enacted to prohibit indecent representation of women through advertisement or in publications, writings, paintings, figures or in any other manner.
- India except Jammu and Kashmir: The Muslim Women (Protection of Rights on Divorce) Act 1986 was passed; as per the Act, a divorced Muslim woman is entitled to reasonable and fair provision and maintenance from her former husband and this should be paid within the period of iddah. According to the Statement of Objects and Reasons of this Act, when a Muslim divorced woman is unable to support herself after the iddah period that she must observe after the death of her spouse or after a divorce, during which she may not marry another man, the magistrate is empowered to make an order for the payment of maintenance by her relatives who would be entitled to inherit her property on her death according to Muslim Law. But when a divorced woman has no such relatives, and does not have enough means to pay the maintenance, the magistrate would order the State Waqf Board to pay the maintenance. The 'liability' of husband to pay the maintenance was thus restricted to the period of the iddah only.
- India: Mary Roy won a lawsuit in 1986, against the inheritance legislation of her Keralite Syrian Christian community in the Supreme Court. The judgement ensured equal rights for Syrian Christian women with their male siblings in regard to their ancestral property. Until then, her Syrian Christian community followed the provisions of the Travancore Succession Act of 1916 and the Cochin Succession Act, 1921, while elsewhere in India the same community followed the Indian Succession Act of 1925.
- United States, Alabama: In Alabama, the marital exemption from the rape law was found unconstitutional, in the case Merton v. State (1986).
- United States, Rhode Island: No person shall be deprived of life, liberty or property without due process of law, nor shall any person be denied equal protection of the laws. No otherwise qualified person shall, solely by reason of race, gender or handicap be subject to discrimination by the state, its agents or any person or entity doing business with the state. Nothing in this section shall be construed to grant or secure any right relating to abortion or the funding thereof. – Rhode Island Constitution, Article I, §2 (1986).
- United States, Connecticut: The "Thurman Law" (aka the Family Violence Prevention and Response Act), instituted in Connecticut in 1986, made domestic violence an automatically arrestable offense, even if the victim did not wish to press charges.
- Slovakia: Abortion was fully legalized on 23 October 1986.
- Cape Verde: Abortion in Cape Verde has been legal upon request prior to 12 weeks gestation since 1986.
- Australia, Queensland: Prior to December 2018, abortion access in Queensland was determined by the 1986 McGuire ruling, which declared abortion to be legal if necessary to preserve the woman from a serious danger to her life or health—beyond the normal dangers of pregnancy and childbirth—that would result if the pregnancy continued, and is not disproportionate to the danger being averted. The McGuire ruling was affirmed in the 1994 case Veivers v. Connolly, by a single judge of the Supreme Court of Queensland.
- New Zealand: In 1986, the Crimes Act 1961 was amended regarding abortion to take into account factors like the extremes of age and sexual violation.
- Greece: Abortion in Greece has been fully legalized since 1986, when Law 1609/1986 was passed effective from 3 July 1986.

1987

- South Korea: The Korean Medical Service Act (revisions in 1987 and 1994)
- Argentina: Divorce is legalized; the new law also provides for gender equality between the wife and husband.
- Paraguay: Abolition of the requirement that married women must have their husbands' permission to initiate judicial proceedings.
- United States: California Federal S. & L. Assn. v. Guerra, 479 U.S. 272 (1987), was a United States Supreme Court case about whether a state may require employers to provide greater pregnancy benefits than required by federal law, as well as the ability to require pregnancy benefits to women without similar benefits to men. The court held that The California Fair Employment and Housing Act in 12945(b)(2), which requires employers to provide leave and reinstatement to employees disabled by pregnancy, is consistent with federal law.
- United States: In 1976, the Rotary Club of Duarte in Duarte, California, admitted three women as members. After the club refused to remove the women from membership, Rotary International revoked the club's charter in 1978. The Duarte club filed suit in the California courts, claiming that Rotary Clubs are business establishments subject to regulation under California's Unruh Civil Rights Act, which bans discrimination based on race, gender, religion or ethnic origin. Rotary International then appealed the decision to the U.S. Supreme Court. The United States Supreme Court, on 4 May 1987, confirmed the Californian decision supporting women, in the case Board of Directors, Rotary International v. Rotary Club of Duarte. Rotary International then removed the gender requirements from its requirements for club charters, and most clubs in most countries have opted to include women as members of Rotary Clubs.
- United States: Johnson v. Transportation Agency, 480 U.S. 616 (1987), is the only United States Supreme Court case to address a sex-based affirmative action plan in the employment context. The case was brought by Paul Johnson, a male Santa Clara Transportation Agency employee, who was passed over for a promotion in favor of Diane Joyce, a female employee who Johnson argued was less qualified. The Court found that the plan did not violate the protection against discrimination on the basis of sex in the Civil Rights Act of 1964, Title VII.
- Spain: Spain's Supreme Court held that a rape victim need not prove that she had fought to defend herself in order to verify the truth of her allegation. Until that important court case, it was generally accepted that a female rape victim, unlike the victims of other crimes, had to show that she had put up "heroic resistance" in order to prove that she had not enticed the rapist or otherwise encouraged him to attack her.

1988

- Pakistan: During the Islamization policy of Muhammad Zia-ul-Haq from 1977 to 1988, women were highly encouraged to veil, and although no law of general compulsory veiling was introduced, all women employed by the federal government (including flight attendants and state television anchors), and university students were mandated to veil.
- United States, Illinois: Stallman v. Youngquist, 531 N.E.2d 355, 359-61 (Ill. 1988) was a court case refusing to recognize the tort of maternal prenatal negligence, holding that granting fetuses legal rights in this manner "would involve an unprecedented intrusion into the privacy and autonomy of the [state's female] citizens".
- United States, Arkansas: An amendment to the state constitution in 1988 said, "The policy of Arkansas is to protect the life of every unborn child from conception until birth, to the extent permitted by the Federal Constitution."
- Switzerland: legal reforms providing gender equality in marriage, abolishing the legal authority of the husband, come into force (these reforms had been approved in 1985 by voters in a referendum.)
- South Africa: Marital power is abolished prospectively for marriages of black people under the civil law, but not for marriages contracted under customary law.
- Brazil: husband no longer "head of the household" (which gave him certain legal powers over his wife).
- Rwanda: Abolition of the requirement that married women must have their husbands' permission to initiate judicial proceedings.
- United States: The Civil Rights Restoration Act of 1987 was passed in 1988 which extended Title IX of the Civil Rights Act of 1964 coverage to all programs of any educational institution that receives any federal assistance, both direct and indirect.
- United States, Bellingham, Washington: A version of the Antipornography Civil Rights Ordinance was passed in Bellingham, Washington; however, the American Civil Liberties Union filed suit against the city of Bellingham after the ordinance was passed, and the federal court struck the law down on First Amendment grounds.
- United States: H.R.5050 – Women's Business Ownership Act of 1988: The Women's Business Ownership Act was passed in 1988 with the help of the National Association Women Business Owners (NAWBO). The Act was created to address the needs of women in business by giving women entrepreneurs better recognition, additional resources, and by eliminating discriminatory lending practices by banks that favored male business owners over female. The bill was signed into law by President Ronald Reagan. Among other things, it put an end to state laws that required women to have male relatives sign business loans.
- Canada: R v Morgentaler was a decision of the Supreme Court of Canada which held that the abortion provision in the Criminal Code was unconstitutional, as it violated a woman's right under section 7 of the Canadian Charter of Rights and Freedoms to security of person. Since this ruling, there have been no criminal laws regulating abortion in Canada.
- Ireland: The Family Law Act 1988 abolished the legal action for restitution of conjugal rights.
- India: The Indian Sati Prevention Act from 1988 further criminalised any type of aiding, abetting, and glorifying of sati.
- France: France legalized the "abortion pill" mifepristone (RU-486).
- Soviet Union: The legalization of miniabortions (abortions by vacuum aspiration performed during the first seven weeks of pregnancy).
- China: Abortion was legalized in 1988.

1989

- Sudan: Beginning in 1989, women were forced to wear a hijab whenever they left their home.
- Vietnam: Article 6 of Decision No. 162 of the Council of Ministers in January 1989 obligated that the State was to provide, for free, birth control devices and public-health services for abortions to eligible persons: "The state will supply, free of charge, birth control devices, such as intrauterine loops and condoms, birth control pills and public health services for the insertion of intrauterine loops and abortions to eligible persons who are cadres, manual workers, civil servants or members of the armed forces, persons to whom priority is given under policy and poor persons who register to practice family planning."
- Vietnam: The Law on the Protection of Public Health was passed on 30 June 1989, affirming people's right to make reproductive decisions over their body and choose their own contraceptive methods. It states that: "Women have the rights to have abortion; to receive gynaecological diagnosis and treatment, and health check-up during pregnancy; and medical service when giving birth at health facilities."
- Malaysia: In 1971, the Parliament of Malaysia amended Section 312 of the Penal Code to permit abortion to save a woman's life. In 1989, Section 312 was amended again to permit abortion to safeguard a woman's mental and physical health.
- United States: Webster v. Reproductive Health Services, 492 U.S. 490 (1989), was a United States Supreme Court decision on July 3, 1989, upholding a Missouri law that imposed restrictions on the use of state funds, facilities, and employees in performing, assisting with, or counseling on abortions. The Supreme Court in Webster allowed for states to legislate in an area that had previously been thought to be forbidden under Roe v. Wade.
- United States: Price Waterhouse v. Hopkins, 490 U.S. 228 (1989), was an important decision by the United States Supreme Court on the issue of employer liability for sex discrimination. The Court held that the employer, the accounting firm Price Waterhouse, must prove by a preponderance of the evidence that the decision regarding employment would have been the same if sex discrimination had not occurred. The accounting firm failed to prove that the same decision to postpone Ann Hopkins's promotion to partnership would have still been made in the absence of sex discrimination, and therefore, the employment decision constituted sex discrimination under Title VII of the Civil Rights Act of 1964. The significance of the Supreme Court's ruling was twofold. First, it established that gender stereotyping is actionable as sex discrimination. Second, it established the mixed-motive framework as an evidentiary framework for proving discrimination under a disparate treatment theory even when lawful reasons for the adverse employment action are also present.
- United States: The first "Restroom Equity" Act in the United States was passed in California in 1989. It was introduced by then-Senator Arthur Torres after several long waits for his wife to return from the bathroom.
- Canada: Brooks v Canada Safeway Ltd [1989] 1 S.C.R. 1219 is a leading Supreme Court of Canada decision on employer discrimination of pregnant employees. The Court found that Safeway violated the provincial Human Rights Act by failing to provide equal compensation for those who missed work due to pregnancy. This decision overturned the controversial case of Bliss v Canada (AG).
- England: Kiranjit Ahluwalia is an Indian woman who came to international attention after burning her husband to death in 1989 in the UK. She claimed it was in response to ten years of physical, psychological, and sexual abuse. After initially being convicted of murder and sentenced to life in prison, Ahluwalia's conviction was later overturned on grounds of inadequate counsel and replaced with voluntary manslaughter. Although her submission of provocation failed (under R v Duffy the loss of control needed to be sudden, which this was not), she successfully pleaded the partial defence of diminished responsibility under s.2 Homicide Act 1957 on the grounds that fresh medical evidence (which was not available at her original trial) may indicate diminished mental responsibility.
- England: The Sara Thornton case concerns that of Englishwoman Sara Thornton who was sentenced to life imprisonment after being convicted of the 1989 murder of her violent and alcoholic husband. Thornton never denied the killing, but claimed it had been an accident during an argument. The prosecution at her trial argued that she had carried out the act for financial gain, and she was found guilty of murder. The case became a cause célèbre among women's groups, and ignited a political debate on how the courts should deal with the issue of domestic violence. At a retrial in 1996 Thornton was found guilty of the lesser charge of manslaughter and freed from custody.
- Austria: Austria made marital rape illegal.
- Belgium: Marital rape began to be treated the same as other forms of rape.
- Chile: Therapeutic abortion, which was permitted by the Health Code in 1931, was abolished by the military dictatorship of Chile on 15 September 1989, arguing that due to advances in medicine it was "no longer justifiable". Before the ban, any woman whose life was in danger could ask to get an abortion if she had the approval of two doctors.
- Albania: In 1989, abortion was legalized in the case of rape and incest or if the patient was under the age of 16.

=== 1990s ===
1990

- Bulgaria: Abortion in Bulgaria has been legal on request within the first 12 weeks of pregnancy since 1 February 1990.
- Belgium: Abortion in Belgium was fully legalised on 4 April 1990.
- Poland: The Ordinance of 30 April 1990 made access to abortion more difficult.
- United States: In re A.C., 573 A.2d 1235 (1990), was a District of Columbia Court of Appeals case. It was the first American appellate court case decided against a forced Caesarean section, although the decision was issued after the fatal procedure was performed. Physicians performed a Caesarean section upon patient Angela Carder (née Stoner) without informed consent in an unsuccessful attempt to save the life of her baby. The case stands as a landmark in United States case law establishing the rights of informed consent and bodily integrity for pregnant women.
- United States: Hodgson v. Minnesota, 497 U.S. 417 (1990), was a United States Supreme Court abortion rights case that dealt with whether a state law may require notification of both parents before a minor can obtain an abortion. The law in question provided a judicial alternative. The law was declared valid with the judicial bypass, but the ruling struck down the two-parent notification requirement.
- United States, New Jersey: The New Jersey Supreme Court ruled that Princeton's all-male eating clubs would have to open to women.
- Ireland: Marital rape was outlawed in 1990.
- Norway: The succession to the Norwegian throne is currently governed by Article 6 of the Constitution, altered most recently in 1990 to introduce absolute primogeniture among the grandchildren and further eligible descendants of King Harald V. The King's children are still ranked according to male-preference cognatic primogeniture, which was the norm between 1971 and 1990.
- Canada: R v. Lavallee, [1990] 1 S.C.R. 852 is a leading Supreme Court of Canada case on the legal recognition of battered woman syndrome. The judgment, written by Justice Bertha Wilson, is generally considered one of her most famous. The court held in favor of allowing battered woman syndrome to explain how the mental conditions for self-defense were present in this case, and Lavallee's acquittal for killing the man she was in an abusive common law relationship with was restored. Justice Wilson, writing for the Court, held that expert evidence is often needed when stereotypes and myths are inherent in a lay-person's reasoning. In particular here, the woman's experience and perspective is relevant to inform the reasonable person's standard required for self-defense.
- Romania: Abortion was legalized on request in Romania.
- United Kingdom: The Human Fertilisation and Embryology Act 1990 was enacted. Section 37 of the act amends the Abortion Act 1967. The section specifies and broadens the conditions where abortion is legal. According to it, women who consider abortion are referred to two doctors. Each doctor then advises her whether abortion is a suitable decision based on the conditions listed below. An abortion is granted only when the doctors reach a unanimous decision that the woman may terminate her pregnancy. An abortion that is performed without this decision or under any other circumstances is considered unlawful. Abortion may be granted under one of the following circumstances:

1. if the pregnancy has not exceeded its 24th week (previously lowered from 28 weeks in the Abortion Act 1967) and has a heightened risk of injury to the physical and/or mental health of the mother, existing children, or family
2. if the pregnancy places the mother's life in jeopardy
3. if the pregnancy poses a risk of grave permanent injury to the mental or physical health of the mother
4. if there is significant risk or evidence that the unborn child would suffer from physical or mental abnormalities, resulting in a serious handicap

The registered medical practitioner that performs the abortion will continue to act in accordance with the Infant Life (Preservation) Act 1929.

- France: Following a case where a man had tortured and raped his wife, the Court of Cassation authorized prosecution of spouses for rape or sexual assault.
- Cameroon: The Cameroon government passed Act No. 90/035 to prohibit birth control education.
- Guam: In 1990, the Legislature of Guam enacted a law prohibiting abortion in all cases except when there was "substantial risk" to the woman's life or continuing the pregnancy would "gravely impair" her health.
- New Zealand: The Contraceptive, Sterilisation and Abortion Amendment Act 1990 eliminated the restriction on who could educate and provide services and supplies.

1991

- France: Two years after Samuel Beckett's death, a French judge ruled that productions of Waiting for Godot with female casts would not cause excessive damage to Beckett's legacy, and allowed the play to be performed by the all-female cast of the Brut de Beton theater company at the Avignon Festival, although an objection by Beckett's representative had to be read before each performance.
- Australia: In 1991, the Sex Discrimination Amendment Act 1991 amended the Marriage Act 1961 to equalise the marriageable age of both males and females at 18 years, subject to "exceptional circumstances". Previously the marriageable age was set at 16 for females and 18 for males.
- United Kingdom: England and Wales: Marital rape was made illegal by the case of R v R.
- United States: The Civil Rights Act of 1991 added provisions to Title VII protections including expanding the rights of women to sue and collect compensatory and punitive damages for sexual discrimination or harassment.
- United States: The case of Ellison v. Brady (US Court of Appeals for the Ninth Circuit – 924 F.2d 872 (9th Cir. 1991)) resulted in rejecting the reasonable person standard in favor of the "reasonable woman standard" in sexual harassment cases which allowed for such cases to be analyzed from the perspective of the complainant and not the defendant.
- United States: Rust v. Sullivan, 500 U.S. 173 (1991), was a United States Supreme Court case decided in 1991 that found restrictions on funding with regard to abortion counseling to be constitutionally permissible.
- United States: United Automobile Workers v. Johnson Controls, Inc. 499 U.S. 187 (1991) is a decision by the Supreme Court of the United States establishing that private sector policies which allow men but not women to knowingly work in potentially hazardous occupations is gender discrimination and violates Title VII of the 1964 Civil Rights Act as amended by the Pregnancy Discrimination Act of 1978. At the time the case was heard, it was considered one of the most important sex-discrimination cases since the passage of Title VII.
- United States: In Robinson v. Jacksonville Shipyards, Inc., a Florida district court judge ruled that "pictures of nude and partially nude women" placed throughout the workplace do constitute sexual harassment.
- Belgium: A new act of succession was put into effect which introduced absolute primogeniture.
- Canada: R v Sullivan, [1991] 1 S.C.R. 489 was a decision by the Supreme Court of Canada on negligence and whether a partially born fetus is a person. The court held that a fetus is not a person regarding the negligence law in the Criminal Code.
- Mexico: Mexico enacted a national marry-your-rapist law in 1931, which was repealed in 1991. As of 2017, the laws of three states (Campeche, Baja California and Sonora) provide that marriage to the victim exonerates the perpetrator of the crime of estupro (seduction of minors).
- Argentina: The Argentine law 24,012 or Argentine quota law (Spanish: Ley de cupo) seeks to increase the number of women in government in Argentina, by setting quotas for the minimum representation of women on the ballots of each party at the legislative elections. The law was enacted in 1991.
- India: In 1991, the Kerala High Court restricted entry of women above the age of 10 and below the age of 50 from Sabarimala Temple as they were of the menstruating age. However, on 28 September 2018, the Supreme Court of India lifted the ban on the entry of women. It said that discrimination against women on any grounds, even religious, is unconstitutional.
- Brazil: Killing of wives due to adultery has been traditionally treated very leniently in Brazil, in court cases where husbands claimed the "legitimate defense of their honor" (legitima defesa da honra) as justification for the killing. Although this defense was not explicitly stipulated in the 20th-century Criminal Code, it has been successfully pleaded by lawyers throughout the 20th century, in particular in the interior of the country, though less so in the coastal big cities. In 1991 Brazil's Supreme Court explicitly rejected the "honor defense" as having no basis in Brazilian law.
- Netherlands: Legislative changes provided a new definition for rape in 1991, which removed the marital exemption, and also made the crime gender-neutral; before 1991 the legal definition of rape was a man forcing, by violence or threat of thereof, a woman to engage in sexual intercourse outside of marriage.
- Mexico, Chiapas: The state of Chiapas legalized abortion.
- Albania: In 1991 abortion-by-application was introduced, allowing women to terminate their pregnancies for a variety of reasons if a board of medical practitioners agreed it was the best decision.
- Sudan: From 1991 until 2019 in Sudan, Article 152 of the Memorandum to the 1991 Penal Code prohibited the wearing of "obscene outfits" in public. It was controversial for various reasons; for example, because it was used to punish women who wore trousers in public by lashing them 40 times.

1992

- New York State, United States: In 1986, seven women who picnicked topless were charged in Rochester, New York, with baring "that portion of the breast which is below the top of the areola". That law had originally been enacted to discourage 'topless' waitresses. The women were initially convicted, but on appeal two of the women's charges were reversed by the New York State Court of Appeals in 1992 on equal protection grounds in Santorelli's case.
- United States: Planned Parenthood v. Casey, 505 U.S. 833 (1992) was a case decided by the Supreme Court of the United States in which the constitutionality of several Pennsylvania state statutory provisions regarding abortion were challenged. Notably, the case was a turn from the Roe v. Wade decision to tie an abortion's legality to the third trimester, associating the legal timeframe with fetal viability. In theory, its aim was to make the woman's decision more thoughtful and informed. The Court's plurality opinion upheld the constitutional right to have an abortion while altering the standard for analyzing restrictions on that right. Applying its new standard of review, the Court upheld four regulations and invalidated the requirement of spousal notification.
- United States: In R.A.V. v. City of St. Paul (1992), the United States Supreme Court overturned a statute prohibiting speech or symbolic expression that "arouses anger, alarm or resentment in others on the basis of race, color, creed, religion or gender" on the grounds that, even if the specific statute was limited to fighting words, it was unconstitutionally content-based and viewpoint-based because of the limitation to race-/religion-/sex-based fighting words. The court, however, made it repeatedly clear that the city could have pursued "any number" of other avenues, and reaffirmed the notion that "fighting words" could be properly regulated by municipal or state governments.
- Slovenia: An amendment was made to the abortion law in 1992 allowing doctors to exempt themselves from performing abortions if they disagree with the practice for religious reasons.
- Italy: In Rome in 1992, a 45-year-old driving instructor was accused of rape. When he picked up an 18-year-old girl for her first driving lesson, he allegedly raped her for an hour, then told her that if she was to tell anyone he would kill her. Later that night she told her parents and her parents agreed to help her press charges. While the alleged rapist was convicted and sentenced, the Italian Supreme Court overturned the conviction in 1998 because the victim wore tight jeans. It was argued that she must have necessarily have had to help her attacker remove her jeans, thus making the act consensual ("because the victim wore very, very tight jeans, she had to help him remove them...and by removing the jeans...it was no longer rape but consensual sex"). The Italian Supreme Court stated in its decision "it is a fact of common experience that it is nearly impossible to slip off tight jeans even partly without the active collaboration of the person who is wearing them." This ruling sparked widespread feminist protest. The day after the decision, women in the Italian Parliament protested by wearing jeans and holding placards that read "Jeans: An Alibi for Rape." As a sign of support, the California Senate and Assembly followed suit. Soon Patricia Giggans, executive director of the Los Angeles Commission on Assaults Against Women, (now Peace Over Violence) made Denim Day an annual event. As of 2011 at least 20 U.S. states officially recognize Denim Day in April. Wearing jeans on this day has become an international symbol of protest. As of 2008 the Italian Supreme Court has overturned their findings, and there is no longer a "denim" defense to the charge of rape.
- Botswana: Attorney General v Dow was a Botswanan High Court case. The plaintiff, Unity Dow, was a citizen of Botswana, married to a non-citizen, whose children had been denied citizenship under a provision of the Citizenship Act of 1984. This Act conferred citizenship on a child born in Botswana only if "a) his father was a citizen of Botswana; or b) in the case of a person born out-of-wedlock, his mother was a citizen of Botswana." The plaintiff claimed that this provision violated guarantees of the Constitution of Botswana. The High Court agreed, holding that the provision infringed:

-The right to liberty; -The right not to be expelled from Botswana; -The right not to be subjected to degrading treatment; and -The right not to be discriminated against on the basis of sex.

The Court concluded that the right to liberty had been infringed because the provision hampered a woman's free choice to marry a non-citizen and, in fact, undermined marriage. The Court also decided that the right not to be expelled from Botswana was infringed because, if the plaintiff's resident permit was not renewed, she would be forced to leave Botswana if she desired to stay with her family. Finally, the Court stated that the right not to be subjected to degrading treatment was infringed because any law discriminating against women constitutes an offense against human dignity. This decision was subsequently upheld by the Botswana Court of Appeal.

- Canada: R v Butler, [1992] 1 S.C.R. 452 is a leading Supreme Court of Canada decision on pornography and state censorship. In this case, the Court had to balance the right to freedom of expression under section 2 of the Canadian Charter of Rights and Freedoms with women's rights. The outcome has been described as a victory for anti-pornography feminism and the Women's Legal Education and Action Fund, but a loss for alternative sexualities.
- Ireland: the X Case (Attorney General v X [1992] 1 IR 1), was a landmark Irish Supreme Court case which established the right of Irish women to an abortion if a pregnant woman's life was at risk because of pregnancy, including the risk of suicide. However, Supreme Court Justice Hugh O'Flaherty, now retired, said in an interview with The Irish Times that the X Case was "peculiar to its own particular facts", since X miscarried and did not have an abortion, and this renders the case moot in Irish law.
- Ireland: The Thirteenth Amendment of the Constitution of Ireland was passed, specifying that the protection of the right to life of the unborn does not limit freedom of travel in and out of the state.
- Ireland: The Fourteenth Amendment of the Constitution of Ireland was passed, specifying that the protection of the right to life of the unborn does not limit the right to distribute information about services in foreign countries.
- France: Sexual harassment in the workplace was made subject to legal sanction in France starting in 1992.
- France: The Court of Cassation convicted a man of the rape of his wife, stating that the presumption that spouses have consented to sexual acts that occur within marriage is only valid when the contrary is not proven.
- Australia: Criminalization of marital rape in Australia began with the state of New South Wales in 1981, followed by all other states from 1985 to 1992.
- Switzerland: Switzerland made marital rape illegal.
- Spain: In Spain, the Supreme Court ruled in 1992 that sex within marriage must be consensual and that sexuality in marriage must be understood in light of the principle of the freedom to make one's own decisions with respect to sexual activity; in doing so it upheld the conviction of a man who had been found guilty of raping his wife by a lower court.
- United States: Franklin v. Gwinnett County Public Schools, 503 U.S. 60 (1992), is a United States Supreme Court Case in which the Court decided, in a unanimous vote, that monetary relief is available under Title IX of the Federal Education Amendments of 1972.
- United States, Massachusetts: On 16 April 1992, after eight years in court litigation in Massachusetts, Gail Grandchamp gained the right to become a boxer, as a state Superior Court judge deemed it was illegal to deny someone a chance to box based on gender.
- Germany: A new law was passed by the Bundestag in 1992, permitting first-trimester abortions on demand, subject to counseling and a three-day waiting period, and permitting late-term abortions when the physical or psychological health of the woman is seriously threatened. The law was quickly challenged in court by a number of individuals – including Chancellor Helmut Kohl – and by the State of Bavaria. The Constitutional Court decided a year later to maintain its earlier decision that the constitution protected the fetus from the moment of conception, but stated that it is within the discretion of parliament not to punish abortion in the first trimester, provided that the woman had submitted to state-regulated counseling intended to discourage termination and protect fetal life. Parliament passed such a law in 1995.

1993

- Canada: R v Morgentaler was a 1993 decision by the Supreme Court of Canada invalidating a provincial attempt to regulate abortion in Canada. In this decision, the provincial regulations were ruled to be a criminal law, which would violate the Constitution Act, 1867. That Act assigns criminal law exclusively to the federal Parliament of Canada.
- South Africa: Marital power is repealed for all civil marriages, whenever they were contracted. The marital power persisted, however, in the Transkei (which was nominally independent from 1976 to 1994) but it was held to be unconstitutional for civil marriages by the High Court in 1999.
- South Africa: South Africa outlawed marital rape.
- United States: Bray v. Alexandria Women's Health Clinic was a United States Supreme Court case in which the court held that 42 U.S.C. 1985(3) does not provide a federal cause of action against persons obstructing access to abortion clinics. Several abortion clinics (most known was the Alexandria Health Clinic) sued to prevent Jayne Bray and other anti-abortion protesters from voicing their freedom of speech in front of the clinics in Washington D.C. Alexandria Women's Health Clinic reported that the protesters violated 42 U.S.C. 1985(3), which prohibits protests to deprive "any person or class of persons of the equal protection of the laws, or of equal privileges and immunities under the laws."
- United States: The "Mexico City Policy", which directed the United States Agency for International Development (USAID) to withhold USAID funds from NGOs that use non-USAID funds to engage in a wide range of activities, including providing advice, counseling, or information regarding abortion, or lobbying a foreign government to legalize or make abortion available, was rescinded by President Clinton.
- United States: Harris v. Forklift Systems, Inc., 510 U.S. 17 (1993), is a case in which the United States of America Supreme Court clarified the definition of a "hostile" or "abusive" work environment under Title VII of the Civil Rights Act of 1964. In a unanimous opinion written by Justice Sandra Day O'Connor, the Court held that a determination about whether a work environment is hostile or abusive requires a consideration of all relevant circumstances.
- United States: On October 22, 1993, President Clinton signed into law the Departments of Labor, Health and Human Services, and Education, and Related Agencies Appropriations Act, 1994. The Act contained a new version of the Hyde Amendment that expanded the category of abortions for which federal funds are available under Medicaid to include cases of rape and incest.
- United States, District of Columbia: In 1989, Lauren Burgess dressed as a male soldier in a U.S. National Park Service reenactment of the Battle of Antietam, and was ejected after she was discovered to be a woman. Burgess sued the Park Service for sexual discrimination. The case spurred spirited debate among Civil War buffs. In 1993, a federal judge ruled in Burgess's favor.
- United States: The Family and Medical Leave Act of 1993 (FMLA) is a United States federal law requiring covered employers to provide employees job-protected and unpaid leave for qualified medical and family reasons. Qualified medical and family reasons include: personal or family illness, family military leave, pregnancy, adoption, or the foster care placement of a child.
- Ireland: In 1993, the Health (Family Planning) (Amendment) Act, 1992 allowed the sale of contraceptives in Ireland without prescription.
- Poland: The law regarding abortion was tightened, removing entirely "difficult living conditions" as a ground for abortions. As such, abortions could be legally obtained only in cases of serious threat to the life or health of the pregnant woman, as attested by two physicians, cases of rape or incest confirmed by a prosecutor, and cases in which prenatal tests, confirmed by two physicians, demonstrated that the fetus was seriously and irreversibly damaged.
- United States: By 1993, all states had either withdrawn exemptions used to legalize marital rape, with the last states to do so being Oklahoma and North Carolina (both in 1993) or their exemption had been declared judicially to be unconstitutional.
- Utah, United States: In Beynon v. St. George-Dixie Lodge 1743 (1993), the Utah Supreme Court ruled that while Freedom of Association allowed the Elks to remain a men-only organization, "the Elks may not avail itself of the benefits of a liquor license and the license's concomitant state regulation" as long as it violated the Utah State Civil Rights Act. Faced with losing their liquor licenses if they did not admit women, the Elks Lodges of Utah voted to become unisex in June 1993, which was followed by a vote at the Elks National Convention in July 1995 to remove the word "male" from the national membership requirements.
- Russia: Regulations of contraceptive sterilization had been in place since the 1930s but were lifted in 1993.

1994

- South Korea: The Korean Medical Service Act (revisions in 1987 and 1994)
- United States, Vermont: Voters approved changing Vermont's constitution to read "persons" rather than "men".
- United States, Illinois: In re Baby Boy Doe, 632 N.E.2d 326 (Ill. App. Ct. 1994) was a court case holding that courts may not balance whatever rights a fetus may have against the rights of a competent woman, whose choice to refuse medical treatment as invasive as a Cesarean section must be honored even if the choice may be harmful to the fetus.
- United States: Madsen v. Women's Health Center, Inc., 512 U.S. 753 (1994), is a United States Supreme Court case where Petitioners challenged the constitutionality of an injunction entered by a Florida state court which prohibits antiabortion protesters from demonstrating in certain places and in various ways outside of a health clinic that performs abortions. The Madsen majority sustained the constitutionality of the Clinic's thirty-six foot buffer zone and the noise-level provision, finding that they burdened no more speech than necessary to serve the injunction's goals. However, the Court struck down the thirty-six foot buffer zone as applied to the private property north and west of the Clinic, the 'images observable' provision, the three hundred foot no-approach zone around the Clinic, and the three hundred foot buffer zone around residences. The Court found that these provisions " [swept] more broadly than necessary" to protect the state's interests. Thus, the judgment of the Florida Supreme Court was affirmed in part and reversed in part.
- Canada: Native Women's Assn of Canada v Canada, [1994] 3 S.C.R. 627, was a decision by the Supreme Court of Canada on section 2, section 15 and section 28 of the Canadian Charter of Rights and Freedoms, in which the Court decided against the claim that the government of Canada had an obligation to financially support an interest group in constitutional negotiations, to allow the group to speak for its people. The case resulted from negotiations for the Charlottetown Accord, in which various groups representing Aboriginal peoples in Canada were financially supported by the government, but the Native Women's Association of Canada (NWAC) was not. Since NWAC claimed the other Aboriginal groups primarily represented Aboriginal men, it argued that section 28 (sexual equality under the Charter) could be used so that section 2 (freedom of expression) required the government to provide an equal benefit to Aboriginal women, supposedly represented by NWAC. The case could be seen as unusual, because as the Court noted, "This case does not involve the typical situation of government action restricting or interfering with freedom of expression in the negative sense" and "the respondents are requesting the Court to consider whether there may be a positive duty on governments to facilitate expression in certain circumstances."
- Cyprus: Cyprus made marital rape illegal.
- Malaysia: A judgment from the then–Supreme Court of Malaysia cites that the niqab, or purdah, "has nothing to do with (a woman's) constitutional right to profess and practise her Muslim religion", because Islam does not make it obligatory to cover the face.
- United States: The Violence Against Women Act of 1994 is a United States federal law (Title IV, sec. 40001-40703 of the Violent Crime Control and Law Enforcement Act, H.R. 3355) signed as Pub. L. 103–322 by President Bill Clinton on September 13, 1994 (codified in part at 42 U.S.C. sections 13701 through 14040). The Act provides $1.6 billion toward investigation and prosecution of violent crimes against women, imposes automatic and mandatory restitution on those convicted, and allows civil redress in cases prosecutors chose to leave un-prosecuted. The Act also establishes the Office on Violence Against Women within the Department of Justice.
- United States: In 1994, the Equity in Athletics Disclosure Act, sponsored by congresswoman Cardiss Collins, required federally assisted higher education institutions to disclose information on roster sizes for men's and women's teams, as well as budgets for recruiting, scholarships, coaches' salaries, and other expenses, annually.
- United States: J. E. B. v. Alabama ex rel. T. B., 511 U.S. 127 (1994), was a case in which the Supreme Court of the United States held that making peremptory challenges based solely on a prospective juror's sex is unconstitutional. J.E.B. extended the court's existing precedent in Batson v. Kentucky (1986), which found race-based peremptory challenges in criminal trials unconstitutional, and Edmonson v. Leesville Concrete Company (1991), which extended that principle to civil trials. As in Batson, the court found that sex-based challenges violate the Equal Protection Clause.
- United States: The Freedom of Access to Clinic Entrances Act (FACE or the Access Act, Pub. L. No. 103-259, 108 Stat. 694) (May 26, 1994, 18 U.S.C. § 248) is a United States law that was signed by President Bill Clinton in May 1994, which prohibits the following three things: (1) the use of physical force, threat of physical force, or physical obstruction to intentionally injure, intimidate, interfere with or attempt to injure, intimidate or interfere with any person who is obtaining reproductive health services or providing reproductive health services (this portion of the law typically refers to abortion clinics), (2) the use of physical force, threat of physical force, or physical obstruction to intentionally injure, intimidate, interfere with or attempt to injure, intimidate or interfere with any person who is exercising or trying to exercise their First Amendment right of religious freedom at a place of religious worship, (3) the intentional damage or destruction of a reproductive health care facility or a place of worship.
- Malawi: In Malawi women were not legally allowed to wear trousers under President Kamuzu Banda's rule until 1994. This law was introduced in 1965.
- Ghana: The Criminal Code was amended in 1994 to outlaw FGM.
- El Salvador: A law made in 1994 known as Article 14, stated that as a general rule, persons under eighteen years of age can not marry, but established in the second paragraph, that exceptionally they can contract marriage if they are pubescent, they already have a child in common, or if the woman is pregnant. This law was abolished in 2017.
- France: Until 1994, France kept in the French Penal Code the article from 1810 that exonerated a rapist in the event of a marriage to their victim.
- France: Law 94-89 criminalized marital rape.
- Finland: Finland made marital rape illegal in 1994.
- Luxembourg: In 1994, in Judgment no. 223/94 V, 1994, the Court of Appeal of Luxembourg confirmed the applicability of the provisions of the Criminal Code regarding rape to marital rape.
- Argentina: The Constitution of Argentina does not establish specific provisions for abortion, but the 1994 reform added constitutional status for a number of international pacts, such as the Pact of San José, which declares the right to life "in general, from the moment of conception". The interpretation of the expression "in general" in certain cases of abortion is still subject to debate.

1995

- Iran: In 1983, the Islamic Consultative Assembly decided that women who do not cover their hair in public will be punished with 74 lashes, and since 1995, unveiled women can also be imprisoned for close to 60 days.
- Albania: Abortion in Albania was fully legalized on December 7, 1995. Abortion can be performed on demand until the twelfth week of pregnancy. Women must undergo counseling for a week prior to the procedure, and hospitals which perform abortions are not allowed to release information to the public regarding which women they have treated.
- Northern Mariana Islands: The Attorney General said that constitutionally, women have a legal right to an abortion.
- Columbus, Ohio, United States: Women in Columbus, Ohio, gained the right to go topless.
- Canada: Thibaudeau v Canada, [1995] 2 SCR 627 was one of a trilogy of equality rights cases published by a divided Supreme Court of Canada in the spring of 1995. The Court held that the provisions of the Income Tax Act requiring an ex-wife to include among her taxable income amounts received from ex-husband as alimony for maintenance of children is not a violation of the ex-wife's equality rights under Section 15 of the Canadian Charter of Rights and Freedoms.
- Djibouti: FGM was outlawed in the country's revised Penal Code that went into effect in April 1995.
- United States: The Violent Crime Control and Law Enforcement Act, enacted in 28 U.S.C. § 994 note Sec. 280003, requires the United States Sentencing Commission to increase the penalties for hate crimes committed on the basis of the actual or perceived gender, race, color, religion, national origin, or ethnicity of any person. In 1995, the Sentencing Commission implemented these guidelines, which only apply to federal crimes.
- Spain: A 1995 reform in the law allows the parents to choose whether the father's or the mother's surname goes first, although this order must be the same for all their children.
- England: Emma Humphreys was a Welsh woman who was imprisoned in England in December 1985 at Her Majesty's pleasure, after being convicted of the murder of her violent 33-year-old boyfriend and pimp, Trevor Armitage. Aged 17 when convicted, Humphreys spent a decade in prison before winning an appeal against the conviction, on 7 July 1995, on the grounds of long-term provocation. The Court of Appeal reduced the conviction to manslaughter, and she was released immediately. Three years later she died, aged 30, from an accidental overdose of prescription drugs at her flat in Holloway, North London. The successful appeal was significant because it supported the argument that courts should take long-term issues such as "battered woman syndrome" into account when considering a defense of provocation. (Note: "The Court of Appeal quashed her murder conviction holding that her characteristic of attention seeking was sufficiently permanent and could be taken into account in assessing the standard of control expected of the defendant.") Humphreys was assisted in her defence by Justice for Women, a feminist law-reform group founded in 1991 by Julie Bindel and Harriet Wistrich.
- Guyana: In 1995, legislation was passed which made abortion legal as long as it was done within the first 8 weeks of pregnancy and done with the consent of the pregnant woman and by a licensed medical practitioner.
- New South Wales, Australia: CES v Superclinics Australia Pty Ltd (1995), extended the period during which health concerns might be considered regarding abortion from the duration of pregnancy to include the woman's future health and well-being.
- Germany: A new law was passed by the Bundestag in 1992, permitting first-trimester abortions on demand, subject to counseling and a three-day waiting period, and permitting late-term abortions when the physical or psychological health of the woman is seriously threatened. The law was quickly challenged in court by a number of individuals – including Chancellor Helmut Kohl – and by the State of Bavaria. The Constitutional Court decided a year later to maintain its earlier decision that the constitution protected the fetus from the moment of conception, but stated that it is within the discretion of parliament not to punish abortion in the first trimester, provided that the woman had submitted to state-regulated counseling intended to discourage termination and protect fetal life. Parliament passed such a law in 1995.
- United States, Illinois: In 1995, the 89th Illinois General Assembly enacted the Parental Notice of Abortion Act, a parental notification law. The Act required physicians to give 48 hours' notice to the parent, grandparent or guardian of a minor seeking an abortion. However, the law was enjoined by the courts for more than two decades.

1996

- Ontario, Canada: On July 19, 1991, a very hot and humid day, Gwen Jacob was arrested, after walking down a street in Guelph, Ontario, while topless and was charged with indecency under Section 173(1)(a) of the Criminal Code. Police stated that they acted following a complaint from a woman who was upset that one of her children had seen Jacob topless. Jacob stated she did it because men were doing it and she wanted to draw attention to the double standard. She was found guilty and fined $75. In her defence she argued that breasts were merely fatty tissue. In finding her guilty, the judge stated that breasts were "part of the female body that is sexually stimulating to men both by sight and touch," and therefore should not be exposed. She appealed, but her appeal was dismissed by the Ontario Court (General Division), and she further appealed to the Ontario Court of Appeal. Jacob was acquitted on December 9, 1996, by the Ontario Court of Appeal on the basis that the act of being topless is not in itself a sexual act or indecent. The court held that "there was nothing degrading or dehumanizing in what the appellant did. The scope of her activity was limited and was entirely non-commercial. No one who was offended was forced to continue looking at her" and that furthermore "the community standard of tolerance when all of the relevant circumstances are taken into account" was not exceeded. Although Jacob claimed she had a constitutional right, the court did not address this. The Ontario Government decided not to appeal the case to the Supreme Court of Canada, and thus it has remained the prevailing interpretation of the Criminal Code in Ontario. Since then, the court ruling has been tested and upheld several times.
- Burkina Faso: A law prohibiting FGM was enacted in 1996 and went into effect in February 1997.
- United States, California: The State shall not discriminate against, or grant preferential treatment to, any individual or group on the basis of race, sex, color, ethnicity, or national origin in the operation of public employment, public education, or public contracting. – California Constitution, Article I, §31(a) (1996). (1996 California Proposition 209)
- Central African Republic: In 1996, the President issued an Ordinance prohibiting FGM throughout the country. It has the force of national law.
- Namibia: The marital power is abolished in 1996 by the Married Persons Equality Act.
- Angola: Abolition of the requirement that married women must have their husbands' permission to initiate judicial proceedings.
- Guatemala: the Guatemalan Constitutional Court struck down the adultery law, which was gendered, based both on the Constitution's gender equality clause and on human rights treaties including CEDAW.
- United States: Fauziya Kasinga, a 19-year-old member of the Tchamba-Kunsuntu tribe of Togo, was granted asylum in 1996 after leaving an arranged marriage to escape FGM; this set a precedent in U.S. immigration law because it was the first time FGM was accepted as a form of persecution. In addition, this was the first situation in which asylum was granted based on gender.
- United States: The Newborns' and Mothers' Health Protection Act of 1996 is a piece of legislation relating to the coverage of maternity by health insurance plans in the United States of America. It was signed into law on September 26, 1996, and requires plans that offer maternity coverage to pay for at least a 48-hour hospital stay following childbirth (96-hour stay in the case of a caesarean section).
- United States: United States v. Virginia, 518 U.S. 515 (1996), was a landmark case in which the Supreme Court of the United States struck down the Virginia Military Institute (VMI)'s long-standing male-only admission policy in a 7–1 decision. (Justice Clarence Thomas, whose son was enrolled at VMI at the time, recused himself.)
- Italy: Italy amended its rape laws, toughening the punishment for sexual assault and reclassifying it from a moral offense to a criminal felony.
- Japan: The Eugenic Protection Law of 1948 made Japan one of the first countries to legalize induced abortion. This law was revised as the Maternal Body Protection Law in 1996.
- El Salvador: "In 1996 the Assembly of El Salvador repealed an old law that exonerated a rapist if he offered to marry the victim and she accepted." However, many rapists still had the ability to get away with rape by marrying the victim according to a law made in 1994 known as Article 14, which stated that as a general rule, persons under eighteen years of age can not marry, but established in the second paragraph, that exceptionally they can contract marriage if they are pubescent, they already have a child in common, or if the woman is pregnant. This law was abolished in 2017.
- North Macedonia: North Macedonia made marital rape illegal in 1996.
- Colombia: Colombia made marital rape illegal.
- Poland: In 1996, the law was amended to allow abortion on social grounds. However, this law was struck down in 1997 by the Constitutional Court, after a brief surge in legal abortions.
- Peru: Law 26628 was adopted in 1996. This law opened the Armed Forces' training schools for officers and noncommissioned officers to women.

1997

- United States, Illinois: In re Fetus Brown, 689 N.E.2d 397, 400 (Ill. App. Ct. 1997) was a court case overturning a court-ordered blood transfusion of a pregnant woman.
- United States, Kansas: In 1997, the Kansas legislature passed the Woman's Right to Know Act, which required, except in the case of a medical emergency, a 24-hour period between the time that the woman is informed in writing of legally-required information and the abortion.
- Honduras: In 1997 Honduras established a penalty from three to six years in prison for women who obtain an abortion and for medical staff who are involved in the process.
- United States: The Campus Hate Crimes Right to Know Act of 1997 enacted 20 U.S.C. § 1092(f)(1)(F)(ii), which requires campus security authorities to collect and report data on hate crimes committed on the basis of gender, race, religion, sexual orientation, ethnicity, or disability.
- South Africa: Fraser v Children's Court, Pretoria North and Others is a 1997 judgment of the Constitutional Court of South Africa which held that, in certain circumstances, the consent of the father is required before a child born out of wedlock may be adopted. In a unanimous decision, the court held that the provisions of the Child Care Act, 1983, which required only the mother's consent, were unconstitutional, but suspended its order for two years so that Parliament could amend the law accordingly.
- India: The Vishakha Guidelines were a set of procedural guidelines for use in India in cases of sexual harassment. They were promulgated by the Indian Supreme Court in 1997 and were superseded in 2013 by the Sexual Harassment of Women at Workplace (Prevention, Prohibition and Redressal) Act, 2013.
- Australia: By 1997, all Australian states and territories had made FGM a criminal offence.
- Germany: Before 1997, the definition of rape in Germany was: "Whoever compels a woman to have extramarital intercourse with him, or with a third person, by force or the threat of present danger to life or limb, shall be punished by not less than two years' imprisonment". In 1997 there were changes to the rape law, broadening the definition, making it gender-neutral, and removing the marital exemption. Before, marital rape could only be prosecuted as "Causing bodily harm" (Section 223 of the German Criminal Code), "Insult" (Section 185 of the German Criminal Code) and "Using threats or force to cause a person to do, suffer or omit an act" (Nötigung, Section 240 of the German Criminal Code) which carried lower sentences and were rarely prosecuted.
- United States: The Federal Prohibition of Female Genital Mutilation Act is enacted.
- Jersey: It is lawful in Jersey to have an abortion in the first 12 weeks of pregnancy so long as specific criteria are met; it is still lawful but with more stringent criteria between 12 and 24 weeks. The criteria were established in the Termination of Pregnancy (Jersey) Law 1997.
- United States: Schenck v. Pro-Choice Network of Western New York, 519 U.S. 357 (1997), was a case heard before the United States Supreme Court related to legal protection of access to abortion. It ruled in an 8–1 decision that "floating buffer zones" preventing protesters approaching people entering or leaving abortion clinics were unconstitutional, though "fixed buffer zones" around the clinics themselves remained constitutional. The Court's upholding the fixed buffer was the most important aspect of the ruling, because it was a common feature of injunctions nationwide.
- United States: The Domestic Violence Offender Gun Ban, often called "the Lautenberg Amendment" ("Gun Ban for Individuals Convicted of a Misdemeanor Crime of Domestic Violence", Pub. L. 104–208 (text) (PDF), 18 U.S.C. § 922(g)(9)), is an amendment to the Omnibus Consolidated Appropriations Act of 1997, enacted by the 104th United States Congress in 1996, which bans access to firearms by people convicted of crimes of domestic violence. The act is often referred to as "the Lautenberg Amendment" after its sponsor, Senator Frank Lautenberg (D – NJ).
- Portugal: In 1997, a new law increased the period in which abortion could be conducted when there was fetal malformation (from 16 to 24 weeks) and in case of rape (from 12 to 16).
- United States: Yeaw v. Boy Scouts of America was a high-profile case filed in 1997 before the Supreme Court of California to determine whether the Boy Scouts of America is a business establishment within the meaning of the Unruh Civil Rights Act (Civ. Code, § 51) and does not have the right to exclude girls from membership. It was determined The Boy Scouts of America are not considered a "business establishment" and do not fall under the provisions of California's Unruh Civil Rights Act.
- United States: Gloria Allred represented Melrose Place actress Hunter Tylo in 1997 when producer Aaron Spelling fired her because she was pregnant. A jury awarded Tylo $4.8 million. The case was important in establishing the rights of actors to continue work if they become pregnant.
- Peru: In 1991, a law was modified to absolve co-conspirators in a gang rape case if one of them married the victim. In 1997, the law was completely repealed.
- Colombia: Colombia repealed its marry-your-rapist law.
- Philippines: The Anti-Rape Law of 1997 states "Article 266-C. Effect of Pardon. – The subsequent valid marriage between the offended party shall extinguish the criminal action or the penalty imposed."
- Turkey: The hijab was banned in universities and public buildings until late 2013 – this included libraries or government buildings. The ban was first in place during the 1980 military coup, but the law was strengthened in 1997.
- Belgium: Prior to 1997, Belgian law provided for mitigating circumstances in the case of a killing or assault against a spouse caught in the act of adultery.
- South Africa: The Choice on Termination of Pregnancy Act, 1996 comes into effect, allowing abortion on demand. The Abortion and Sterilization Act, 1975, which only allowed abortions in very limited circumstances, is repealed.
- Hungary: Hungary outlawed marital rape.
- Guernsey: It is lawful in Guernsey to have an abortion in the first 12 weeks of pregnancy so long as specific criteria are met; it is still lawful but with more stringent criteria between 12 and 24 weeks. The criteria were established in the Abortion (Guernsey) Law 1997. Other Channel Islands which are part of the Bailiwick of Guernsey (including Alderney, Sark and Herm) also come under the articles of this Law.
- Guam: In 1990, the Legislature of Guam enacted a law prohibiting abortion in all cases except when there was "substantial risk" to the woman's life or continuing the pregnancy would "gravely impair" her health. This law was challenged by the American Civil Liberties Union and struck down by the ninth circuit court of Guam in a case called Guam Society of Obstetricians and Gynecologists v. Ada in 1997.
- Poland: In 1996, the law was amended to allow abortion on social grounds. However, this law was struck down in 1997 by the Constitutional Court, after a brief surge in legal abortions.

1998

- United States, Kentucky: The Kentucky General Assembly passed legislation that required clinics to have an Abortion Clinic License if they wanted to operate. Part of this was a requirement for a transfer agreement between the clinic and a hospital and ambulance.
- United States, Iowa: All men and women are, by nature, free and equal and have certain inalienable rights—among which are those of enjoying and defending life and liberty, acquiring, possessing and protecting property, and pursuing and obtaining safety and happiness. – Iowa Constitution, Article I, §1 (1998).
- United States, Florida: Basic rights. All natural persons, female and male alike, are equal before the law and have inalienable rights, among which are the right to enjoy and defend life and liberty, to pursue happiness, to be rewarded for industry, and to acquire, possess and protect property; except that the ownership, inheritance, disposition and possession of real property by aliens ineligible for citizenship may be regulated or prohibited by law. No person shall be deprived of any right because of race, religion, national origin, or physical disability. – Florida Constitution, Article I, §2 (1998).
- Ontario, Canada: R. v. Gowan is a March 1998 case tried by the Ontario Court of Justice which ruled that, while a woman being topless as form of protest and free speech is legal, her being topless while she engages in a commercial purpose such as prostitution is illegal.
- South Africa: Recognition of Customary Marriages Act, 1998 – women in customary marriages no longer legal minors.
- Moscow, Idaho, United States: Women in Moscow, Idaho gained the right to go topless.
- United States: Faragher v. City of Boca Raton, 524 U.S. 775 (1998), was a United States Supreme Court case in which the Court identified the circumstances under which an employer may be held liable under Title VII of the Civil Rights Act of 1964 for the acts of a supervisory employee whose sexual harassment of subordinates has created a hostile work environment amounting to employment discrimination. The court held that "an employer is vicariously liable for actionable discrimination caused by a supervisor, but subject to an affirmative defense looking to the reasonableness of the employer's conduct as well as that of a plaintiff victim."
- United States: Lois E. Jenson v. Eveleth Taconite Co. was the first class-action sexual harassment lawsuit in the United States. It was filed in 1988 on behalf of Lois Jenson and other female workers at the EVTAC mine in Eveleth, Minnesota on the state's northern Mesabi Range, which is part of the Iron Range. On December 23, 1998, just before the trial was set to begin, fifteen women settled with Eveleth Mines for a total of $3.5 million.
- United States: Miller v. Albright, 523 U.S. 420 (1998), was a United States Supreme Court case in which the Court upheld the validity of laws relating to U.S. citizenship at birth for children born outside the United States, out of wedlock, to an American parent. The Court declined to overturn a more restrictive citizenship requirement applying to an illegitimate foreign-born child of an American father, as opposed to a child born to an American mother under similar circumstances.
- Côte d'Ivoire: A December 18, 1998 law provides that harm to the integrity of the genital organ of a woman by complete or partial removal, excision, desensitization or by any other procedure will, if harmful to a woman's health, be punishable by imprisonment of one to five years and a fine of 360,000 to two million CFA Francs (approximately US$576–3,200). The penalty is five to twenty years incarceration if a death occurs during the procedure and up to five years' prohibition of medical practice, if this procedure is carried out by a doctor.
- Tanzania: Section 169A of the Sexual Offences Special Provisions Act of 1998 prohibits FGM in Tanzania. Punishment is imprisonment of from five to fifteen years or a fine not exceeding 300,000 shillings (approximately US$250) or both. But the Tanzania 1998 Act protects only girls up to the age of 18 years.
- Togo: On October 30, 1998, the National Assembly unanimously voted to outlaw the practice of FGM.
- Ireland: The Employment Equality Act, 1998 upholds gender equality.
- Pakistan: Anti-dowry law of 1998; it has proven to be unenforceable.
- United States: Burlington Industries, Inc. v. Ellerth, 524 US 742 (1998) is a landmark employment law case of the United States Supreme Court holding that employers are liable if supervisors create a hostile work environment for employees. Ellerth also introduced a two-part affirmative defense allowing employers to avoid sex discrimination liability if they follow best practices. Ellerth is often considered alongside Faragher v. City of Boca Raton.
- United States: In Gebser v. Lago Vista Independent School District, the Supreme Court ruled that in order for a party to recover sexual harassment damages under Title IX of the Education Amendments of 1972, they must show that a school district official knew what was happening and was able to take measures to correct it if they wished, and that the educational establishment deliberately failed to respond properly. Since that was not what happened in this case, Lago Vista was not liable for sexual harassment damages.
- United States: Oncale v. Sundowner Offshore Services, 523 U.S. 75 (1998), was a decision of the Supreme Court of the United States. The case arose out of a suit for sex discrimination by a male oil-rig worker, who claimed that he was repeatedly subjected to sexual harassment by his male co-workers with the acquiescence of his employer. The Court held that Title VII's protection against workplace discrimination "because of... sex" applied to harassment in the workplace between members of the same sex.
- New Zealand: In R v Fate (1998) 16 CRNZ 88 a woman who had come to New Zealand from the small island of Nanumea, which is part of the Tuvalu Islands, received a two-year sentence for manslaughter by provocation. Mrs. Fate spoke no English and was isolated within a small close-knit Wellington community of 12 families, so she felt trapped in her abusive relationship.
- South Africa: In Christian Lawyers Association and Others v Minister of Health and Others, the Transvaal Provincial Division of the High Court of South Africa upholds the Choice on Termination of Pregnancy Act, holding that the Constitution of South Africa does not forbid abortions.
- Croatia: Croatia made marital rape illegal.
- United Kingdom: The British Boxing Board of Control initially refused to grant Jane Couch a professional licence on the sole ground that she was a woman, and argued that PMS made women too unstable to box. Claiming sexual discrimination and supported by the Equal Opportunities Commission, Couch managed to have this decision overturned by a tribunal in March 1998.
- El Salvador: Abortion in El Salvador is illegal. The law formerly permitted an abortion to be performed under some limited circumstances, but, in 1998, all exceptions were removed when a new abortion law went into effect.
- Australia, Western Australia: In Western Australia, since 20 May 1998, abortions are allowed on request (with a referral from a doctor) up to 20 weeks of pregnancy—subject to counselling by a medical practitioner other than the one performing the abortion—or when serious personal, family or social consequences will result to the woman if an abortion is not performed, when the life or physical or mental health of the woman is endangered and when the pregnancy causes serious danger to the woman's mental health. After 20 weeks of pregnancy abortions may only be performed if the fetus is likely to be born with severe medical problems—which must be confirmed by two independently appointed doctors. In the event of the woman being under 16 years of age one of her parents must be notified, except where permission has been granted by the Children's Court or the woman does not live with her parents.

1999

- United States, Northern District of Florida: Pemberton v. Tallahassee Memorial Regional Center, 66 F. Supp. 2d 1247 (N.D. Fla. 1999), is a case in the United States regarding reproductive rights. Pemberton had a previous c-section (vertical incision), and with her second child attempted to have a VBAC (vaginal birth after c-section). When a doctor she had approached about a related issue at the Tallahassee Memorial Regional Center found out, he and the hospital sued to force her to get a C-section. The court held that the rights of the fetus at or near birth outweighed the rights of Pemberton to determine her own medical care. She was physically forced to stop laboring, and taken to the hospital, where a c-section was performed. Her suit against the hospital was dismissed. The court held that a cesarean section at the end of a full-term pregnancy was here deemed to be medically necessary by doctors to avoid a substantial risk that the fetus would die during delivery due to uterine rupture, a risk of 4–6% according to the hospital's doctors and 2% according to Pemberton's doctors. Furthermore, the court held that a state's interest in preserving the life of an unborn child outweighed the mother's constitutional interest of bodily integrity. The court held that Roe v. Wade was not applicable, because bearing an unwanted child is a greater intrusion on the mother's constitutional interests than undergoing a cesarean section to deliver a child that the mother affirmatively desires to deliver. The court further distinguished In re A.C. by stating that it left open the possibility that a non-consenting patient's interest would yield to a more compelling countervailing interest in an "extremely rare and truly exceptional case." The court then held this case to be such.
- United States: NCAA v. Smith, 525 U.S. 459 (1999), was a case in which the Supreme Court of the United States ruled that the NCAA's receipt of dues payments from colleges and universities which received federal funds was not sufficient to subject the NCAA to a lawsuit under Title IX.
- United States: A United States House of Representatives appropriations bill (HR 2490) that contained an amendment specifically permitting breastfeeding was signed into law on September 29, 1999. It stipulated that no government funds may be used to enforce any prohibition on women breastfeeding their children in federal buildings or on federal property.
- United States: A federal law enacted in 1999 specifically provides that "a woman may breastfeed her child at any location in a federal building or on federal property, if the woman and her child are otherwise authorized to be present at the location."
- United States: In Davis v. Monroe County Board of Education, the Supreme Court ruled that a school board can be held responsible under Title IX of the Education Amendments of 1972 for student-on-student sexual harassment.
- Senegal: A law that was passed in January 1999 makes FGM illegal in Senegal.
- South Africa: The marital power persisted in the Transkei (which was nominally independent from 1976 to 1994) but it was held to be unconstitutional for civil marriages by the Transkei High Court in 1999.
- Japan: The birth control pill was legalized in Japan in 1999.
- Egypt: Article 291 of the Egypt Penal Code was repealed by former president Hosni Mubarak by a presidential decree. The article had been adopted in 1904 and inspired by a French provision. The article allowed any man who committed sexual assault against a woman to avoid penalty if he entered into marriage with the victim.
- Chile: A new Sexual Crimes Code, which no longer contained a rape-marriage law, was enacted in July 1999.
- Sark: Women in Sark were given equal rights of property inheritance.
- Canada: The Supreme Court of Canada ruled in British Columbia (Public Service Employee Relations Commission) v. BCGSEU that a mandatory fitness test for those seeking to become firefighters in British Columbia unfairly discriminated against women. The test had been based on the physiology of male firefighters. The Court ruled that employers must show that any required workplace tests are necessary, and that there has been some effort to accommodate individuals.

=== 2000 ===
- Italy: Female toplessness was officially legalized (in a nonsexual context) in all public beaches and swimming pools throughout Italy (unless otherwise specified by region, province or municipality by-laws) on 20 March 2000, when the Supreme Court of Cassation (through sentence No. 3557) determined that the exposure of the nude female breast, after several decades, was considered a "commonly accepted behavior", and therefore, "entered into the social costume".
- Italy: In 2000, the decree of the President of Italy n. 396/2000 introduced the right for women to opt for anonymous childbirth. The newborn is not legally recognized by their natural parents and does not assume the father/mother's surname. The mother has by law the right to remain permanently anonymous and the custody of the newborn is temporarily given to the hospital, waiting until a third party adoption takes place.
- International: United Nations Security Council Resolution 1325 (UNSRC 1325) was adopted unanimously on 31 October 2000, after recalling resolutions 1261 (1999), 1265 (1999), 1296 (2000), and 1314 (2000). The resolution on women, peace and security acknowledges the disproportionate and unique impact of armed conflict on women and girls. It calls for the adoption of a gender perspective to consider the special needs of women and girls during conflict, repatriation and resettlement, rehabilitation, reintegration and post-conflict reconstruction. Resolution 1325 was the first formal and legal document from the United Nations Security Council (UNSC) that required parties in a conflict to prevent violations of women's rights, to support women's participation in peace negotiations and in post-conflict reconstruction, and to protect women and girls from sexual and gender-based violence in armed conflict. It was also the first United Nations resolution to specifically mention women.
- Namibia: Namibia outlawed marital rape in 2000.
- United States: The Equal Employment Opportunity Commission ruled that companies that provided insurance for prescription drugs to their employees but excluded birth control were violating the Civil Rights Act of 1964.
- United States: Stenberg v. Carhart, 530 U.S. 914 (2000), is a case heard by the Supreme Court of the United States, dealing with a Nebraska law which made performing "partial-birth abortion" illegal, without regard for the health of the mother. Nebraska physicians who performed the procedure contrary to the law were subject to having their medical licenses revoked. The Court struck down the law, finding the Nebraska statute criminalizing "partial birth abortion[s]" violated the Due Process Clause of the United States Constitution, as interpreted in Planned Parenthood v. Casey and Roe v. Wade.
- International: The Optional Protocol to the Convention on the Elimination of All Forms of Discrimination against Women (OP-CEDAW) is an international treaty which establishes complaint and inquiry mechanisms for the Convention on the Elimination of All Forms of Discrimination Against Women (CEDAW). Parties to the Protocol allow the Committee on the Elimination of Discrimination against Women to hear complaints from individuals or inquire into "grave or systematic violations" of the Convention. The Protocol has led to a number of decisions against member states on issues such as domestic violence, parental leave and forced sterilization, as well as an investigation into the systematic killing of women in the Mexican city of Ciudad Juárez, Chihuahua. The Protocol was adopted by the United Nations General Assembly on 6 October 1999, and in force from 22 December 2000. As of October 2016, the Protocol has 80 signatories and 108 parties.
- United States: United States v. Morrison, 529 U.S. 598 (2000), is a United States Supreme Court decision which held that parts of the Violence Against Women Act of 1994 were unconstitutional because they exceeded congressional power under the Commerce Clause and under section 5 of the Fourteenth Amendment to the Constitution.
- International: Kadic v. Karadzic resulted in a jury verdict of $745 million in New York City on August 10, 2000. The lawsuit (under the United States' Alien Tort Statute) established forced prostitution and forced impregnation as legally actionable acts of genocide.
- South Africa: In 2000 the Recognition of Customary Marriages Act abolished the marital power for all marriages under customary law throughout South Africa.
- Romania: Romania abolished its marry-your-rapist law.
- United Kingdom: The United Kingdom began putting a value-added tax on sanitary products when it joined the European Economic Community in 1973. This rate was reduced to 5% specifically for sanitary products in 2000.
- Australia, Queensland: Women's boxing was legalized in Queensland in 2000.
- Venezuela: Venezuela approved a law in 1926 banning abortion that was left unmodified up to 2000, when a reform allowed the procedure if the woman's life was in danger. A clause of the Venezuelan Penal Code reduces the sentence "if the author of the abortion commits it to save his or his mother, wife or children's honour". While the punishment for a doctor or any person who performs the procedure is between one and three years, harsher penalties may apply if the pregnant woman dies as a result of the procedure.
- Country of Georgia: Abortion in Georgia is legal on request within the first 12 weeks of pregnancy. Between 12 and 22 weeks, abortions may be performed on medical grounds under conditions established by the Ministry of Health, Labour and Social Affairs. After 22 weeks, abortions additionally require approval of a three-member medical committee. The law governing abortion was instituted in 2000.

== See also ==
- Legal rights of women in history
- Timeline of reproductive rights legislation
- Timeline of women's legal rights in the United States (other than voting)
- Timeline of women's legal rights (other than voting)
