= Timeline of women's legal rights in the United States (other than voting) =

The following timeline represents formal legal changes and reforms regarding women's rights in the United States except voting rights. It includes actual law reforms as well as other formal changes, such as reforms through new interpretations of laws by precedents.

== Before the 19th century ==
1641

- Massachusetts: The 1641 Body of Liberties of the Massachusetts Bay colonists declares that a married woman should be, "free from bodilie correction or stripes by her husband".

1662

- The Virginia colony passes a law incorporating the principle of partus sequitur ventrem, ruling that children of enslaved mothers would be born into slavery, regardless of their father's race or status.

1664

- Maryland declares that any Englishwoman who married a slave had to live as a slave of her husband's master.

1718

- Province of Pennsylvania (now U.S. state of Pennsylvania): Married women are given the right to own and manage property in their own name during the incapacity of their spouse.

== 19th century ==
1820–1900

- Primarily through the efforts of physicians in the American Medical Association and legislators, most abortions in the U.S. are outlawed.

1821

- Maine: Married women were given the right to own and manage property in their own name during the incapacity of their spouse.

1827

- Illinois: A law prohibits the sale of drugs that could induce abortions, classifying those medications as "poison". It was the first in the nation to impose criminal penalties in connection with abortion before quickening.
- New York: The first statute to criminalize abortion in the state is enacted. It made post-quickening abortions a felony and pre-quickening abortions a misdemeanor.

1835

- Arkansas: Married women are given the right to own (but not control) property in their own name.
- Massachusetts: Married women are given the right to own and manage property in their own name during the incapacity of their spouse.
- Tennessee: Married women are given the right to own and manage property in their own name during the incapacity of their spouse.

1839

- Mississippi: The Married Women's Property Act 1839 grants married women the right to own (but not control) property in her own name.

1840

- Maine: Married women are given the right to own (but not control) property in their own name.

1841

- Maryland: Married women are given the right to own (but not control) property in their own name.

1842

- New Hampshire: Married women are given the right to own and manage property in their own name during the incapacity of their spouse.

1843

- Kentucky: Married women are given the right to own and manage property in their own name during the incapacity of their spouse.

1844

- Maine: Married women are granted separate economy and trade licenses.
- Massachusetts: Married women are granted separate economy.

1845

- New York: Married women are granted patent rights. The state also passes a statute that proclaimed women who had abortions could be given a prison sentence of three months to a year. It was one of the few states at the time to have laws punishing women for getting abortions.
- Florida: Married women are given the right to own (but not control) property in their own name.

1846

- Alabama: Married women are given the right to own (but not control) property in their own name.
- Kentucky: Married women are given the right to own (but not control) property in their own name.
- Ohio: Married women are given the right to own (but not control) property in their own name.
- Michigan: Married women are given the right to own and manage property in their own name during the incapacity of their spouse.

1848

- New York: Married Women's Property Act grants married women separate economy.
- Pennsylvania: Married women are granted separate economy.
- Rhode Island: Married women are granted separate economy.

1849

- Alabama: Married women are given the right to own and manage property in their own name during the incapacity of their spouse.
- Connecticut: Married women are given the right to own and manage property in their own name during the incapacity of their spouse.
- Missouri: Married women are given the right to own (but not control) property in their own name.
- South Carolina: Married women are given the right to own (but not control) property in their own name.

=== 1850–1874 ===
1850

- California: Married Women's Property Act grants married women separate economy.
- Wisconsin: Married Women's Property Act grants married women separate economy.
- Oregon: Unmarried women are given the right to own land.
- Tennessee: Tennessee becomes the first state in the United States to explicitly outlaw wife beating.

1852

- New Jersey: Married women are granted separate economy.
- Indiana: Married women are given the right to own (but not control) property in their own name.
- Wisconsin: Married women are given the right to own and manage property in their own name during the incapacity of their spouse.

Circa 1853

- Illinois: When Illinois opened its first hospital for the mentally ill in 1851, the state legislature passed a law that within two years of its passage was amended to require a public hearing before a person could be committed against his or her will. There was one exception, however: a husband could have his wife committed without either a public hearing or her consent.

1854

- Massachusetts: Married women are granted separate economy.

1855

- Michigan: Married women are granted separate economy.

1856

- Connecticut: Married women are granted patent rights.

1857

- Maine: Married women are granted the right to control their own earnings.
- Oregon: Married women are given the right to own (but not control) property in their own name.
- Oregon: Married women are given the right to own and manage property in their own name during the incapacity of their spouse.

1859

- Kansas: Married Women's Property Act grants married women separate economy.

1860

- New York's Married Women's Property Act of 1860 passes. Married women are granted the right to control their own earnings.
- Maryland: Married women are granted separate economy, the right to control their earnings, and trade licenses.
- Massachusetts: Married women granted trade licenses.

1861

- Illinois: Married women are granted separate economy and control over their earnings.
- Ohio: Married women are granted separate economy and control over their earnings.

1862

- New York's Married Women's Property Act of 1860 is amended so that women lost equal guardianship of their children, and only had veto power over decisions on apprenticeship and the appointment of testamentary guardians. Parts of the act that made husbands and wives equal in realty in cases of intestacy were overturned.

1864

- North Carolina: The Supreme Court of North Carolina decides, in the case State v. Black, that "[a] husband cannot be convicted of a battery on his wife unless he inflicts a permanent injury or uses such excessive violence or cruelty as indicates malignity or vindictiveness; and it makes no difference that the husband and wife are living separate by agreement."

1865

- Louisiana: Married women are given the right to own and manage property in their own name during the incapacity of their spouse.

1867

- Illinois: In 1867, the state passes the Bill for the Protection of Personal Liberty, which guaranteed all people accused of insanity, including wives, had the right to a public hearing. It also passes a bill that made abortion and attempted abortion a criminal offense.
- Alabama: Married women are granted separate economy.
- New Hampshire: Married women are granted separate economy.

1868

- North Carolina: Married women are granted separate economy.
- Arkansas: Married women are granted trade licenses.
- Kansas: Married women are granted separate economy, trade licenses, and control over their earnings.
- South Carolina: Married women were given the right to own (but not control) property in their own name.
- Georgia: Married women were given the right to own (but not control) property in their own name.
- New York City: Susannah Lattin's death led to an investigation that resulted in the regulation of maternity clinics and adoptions in New York City.

1869

- Minnesota: Married women were granted separate economy.
- Georgia: Married women were granted separate economy.
- South Carolina: Married women are granted separate economy and trade licenses.
- Tennessee: Married women are granted separate economy.
- Iowa: Married women are granted control over their earnings.
- Illinois and Massachusetts: Legislation passed in both states allow married women equal rights to property and custody of their children.

Circa 1870

- Illinois passes another law banning the sale of drugs that could cause induced abortions, allowing an exception for "the written prescription of some well-known and respectable practicing physician".

1870

- Wyoming Territory: Justice Howe gives women the rights to sit on a jury. The first woman to serve on a jury was Eliza Stewart Boyd.

1871

- Mississippi: Married women are granted separate economy, trade licenses, and control over their earnings.
- Arizona: Married women are granted separate economy.
- Arizona: Married women are granted trade license.

1872

- New York: The state makes it a penalty to perform an abortion, with a criminal sentence of between 4 and 20 years in prison.
- Pennsylvania: Married women are granted control over their earnings.
- California: Married women are granted separate economy.
- Montana: Married women are granted separate economy.
- California: Married women are granted trade license.
- California: Married women are granted control over their earnings.
- Wisconsin: Married women are granted control over their earnings.

1873

- Arkansas: Married women are granted separate economy and control over their earnings.
- Kentucky: Married women are granted separate economy and trade licenses.
- North Carolina: Married women are granted control over their earnings.
- Delaware: Married women are granted control over their earnings.
- Iowa: Married women are granted separate economy.
- Nevada: Married women are granted separate economy, trade licenses, and control over their earnings.
- Iowa: Married women are granted trade license.
- The Comstock Law was a federal act passed by the United States Congress on March 3 as the Act for the "Suppression of Trade in, and Circulation of, Obscene Literature and Articles of Immoral Use". The Act criminalized usage of the U.S. Postal Service to send any of the following items:
  - erotica
  - contraceptives
  - abortifacients
  - sex toys
  - personal letters alluding to any sexual content or information
  - information regarding the above items

In places like Washington D.C., where the federal government had direct jurisdiction, the act also made it a misdemeanor, punishable by fine and imprisonment, to sell, give away, or have in possession any "obscene" publication. Half of the states passed similar anti-obscenity statutes that also banned possession and sale of obscene materials, including contraceptives.
The law was named after its chief proponent, Anthony Comstock. Due to his own personal enforcement of the law during its early days, Comstock received a commission from the postmaster general to serve as a special agent for the U.S. Postal Services.

- Bradwell v. State of Illinois was a United States Supreme Court case that solidified the narrow reading of the Privileges or Immunities Clause of the Fourteenth Amendment, and determined that the right to practice a profession was not among these privileges. The case is notable for being an early Fourteenth Amendment challenge to sex discrimination in the United States. In this case the United States Supreme Court held that Illinois constitutionally denied law licenses to women, because the right to practice law was not one of the privileges and immunities guaranteed by the Fourteenth Amendment. The Illinois Supreme Court affirmed.

1874

- Massachusetts: Married women are granted control over their earnings.
- New Jersey: Married women are granted control over their earnings and trade licenses.
- Rhode Island: Married women are granted control over their earnings.
- Colorado: Married women are granted separate economy, trade licenses, and control over their earnings.
- Illinois: Married women are granted trade license.
- Minnesota: Married women are granted trade license.
- Montana: Married women are granted control over their earnings and trade licenses.

=== 1875–1899 ===
1875

- The Page Act of 1875 is the first restrictive federal immigration law in the United States, and effectively prohibited the entry of Chinese women, marking the end of open borders. The law technically barred immigrants considered "undesirable", defining this as a person from East Asia who was coming to the United States to be a forced laborer, any East Asian woman who would engage in prostitution, and all people considered to be convicts in their own country. Only the ban on female East Asian immigrants was effectively and heavily enforced, and it proved to be a barrier for all East Asian women trying to immigrate, especially Chinese women. The act was later repealed.
- New Hampshire: Married women are granted trade licenses.
- Wyoming: Married women are granted separate economy, control over their earnings, and trade licenses.

1877

- Connecticut: Married women are granted control over their earnings and trade licenses.
- Dakota: Married women are granted separate economy, control over their earnings, and trade licenses.
- Wisconsin: On March 22, state legislature enacts a law that prohibited courts from denying admission to the bar on the basis of sex. The bill was drafted by Lavinia Goodell and she worked with Speaker of the Wisconsin State Assembly John B. Cassoday for it to pass.

1878

- Virginia: Married women are granted separate economy.

1879

- Indiana: Married women are granted separate economy and control over their earnings.
- California: "A person may not be disqualified from entering or pursuing a business, profession, vocation, or employment because of sex, race, creed, color, or national or ethnic origin."
- A law was enacted allowing qualified female attorneys to practice in any federal court in the United States.

1880

- The case Miles v. United States establishes that a second wife may testify as to her husband's bigamy because their marriage is not de jure.
- Oregon: Married women were granted trade licenses and control over their earnings.

1881

- Vermont: Married women were granted separate economy and trade licenses.
- Nebraska: Married women granted separate economy, trade licenses, and control over their earnings.
- Florida: Married women were given the right to own and manage property in their own name during the incapacity of their spouse.

1882

- Lindon v. First National Bank is one of the earliest precedent-setting US federal court cases involving common law name change.

1883

- Washington Territory: Women are granted jury service rights.

1887

- Washington Territory: Women's jury service rights are rescinded due to a change in the territory's Supreme Court.
- Idaho: Married women are granted separate economy and trade licenses.
- The Edmunds–Tucker Act disincorporates both the Church of Jesus Christ of Latter-day Saints (LDS Church) and the Perpetual Emigration Fund on the grounds that they foster polygamy. It prohibits the practice of polygamy and punishes it with a fine of from $500 to $800 and imprisonment of up to five years. It dissolved the corporation of the church and directed the confiscation by the federal government of all church properties valued over a limit of $50,000. The act was enforced by the U.S. Marshal and a host of deputies. The act:
  - Disincorporated the LDS Church and the Perpetual Emigrating Fund Company, with assets to be used for public schools in the Territory.
  - Required an anti-polygamy oath for prospective voters, jurors and public officials.
  - Annulled territorial laws allowing illegitimate children to inherit.
  - Required civil marriage licenses (to aid in the prosecution of polygamy).
  - Abrogated the common law spousal privilege for polygamists, thus requiring wives to testify against their husbands.
  - Disenfranchised women (who had been enfranchised by the Territorial legislature in 1870).
  - Replaced local judges (including the previously powerful Probate Court judges) with federally appointed judges.
  - Abolished the office of Territorial superintendent of district schools, granting the supreme court of the Territory of Utah the right to appoint a commissioner of schools. Also called for the prohibition of the use of sectarian books and for the collection of statistics of the number of so-called gentiles and Mormons attending and teaching in the schools.
    In 1890 the U.S. Supreme Court upheld the seizure of Church property under the Edmunds–Tucker Act in Late Corporation of the Church of Jesus Christ of Latter-Day Saints v. United States. The act was repealed in 1978.

1889

- State of Washington: Married women are granted separate economy, control over their earnings, and trade licenses.

1890

- The case Bassett v. United States, had a ruling that polygamous wives can be required to testify as they are not legally wives.
- Wyoming: "In their inherent right to life, liberty and the pursuit of happiness, all members of the human race are equal. Since equality in the enjoyment of natural and civil rights is only made sure through political equality, the laws of this state affecting the political rights and privileges of its citizens shall be without distinction of race, color, sex, or any circumstance or condition whatsoever other than the individual incompetency or unworthiness duly ascertained by a court of competent jurisdiction. The rights of citizens of the state of Wyoming to vote and hold office shall not be denied or abridged on account of sex. Both male and female citizens of this state shall equally enjoy all civil, political and religious rights and privileges."

1893

- In 1893, the South Carolina General Assembly "mandated that women should be allowed to attend [ South Carolina College ] as special students". (Two years later, the college's board of trustees made the decision to allow female students into the school.)

1894

- Louisiana: Married women are granted trade licenses.

1895

- South Carolina: Married women are granted separate economy.
- Utah: Married women are granted separate economy.
- State of Washington: Married women are granted control over their earnings and trade licenses.

1896

- Utah: "The rights of citizens of the State of Utah to vote and hold office shall not be denied or abridged on account of sex. Both male and female citizens of this State shall enjoy all civil, political and religious rights and privileges."

1898

- Utah: State legislature grants women permission to serve on juries in 1898. Although women were able to serve on juries starting in 1898, women were able to seek exemption from jury duty and they did not regularly serve on juries until the 1930s.

== 20th century ==
=== 1900–1939 ===
1907

- Section 3 of the Expatriation Act of 1907 provides for loss of citizenship by American women who married aliens. Section 4 provided for retention of American citizenship by formerly alien women who had acquired citizenship by marriage to an American after the termination of their marriages. Women residing in the US automatically retained their American citizenship if they did not explicitly renounce; women residing abroad had the option to retain American citizenship by registration with a US consul. The aim of these provisions was to prevent cases of multiple nationalities among women.

1908

- Muller v. Oregon is a landmark decision in United States Supreme Court history that was used to justify both sex discrimination and usage of labor laws during the time period. It upheld Oregon state restrictions on the working hours of women as justified by the special state interest in protecting women's health. The ruling had important implications for protective labor legislation.
- New York City: The Sullivan Ordinance is a municipal law passed on January 21 by the board of aldermen, barring management of public buildings from allowing women to smoke within their venues. The mayor, George B. McClellan Jr., vetoed the ordinance in February.

1910

- The White-Slave Traffic Act, or the Mann Act, is a United States federal law passed June 25. It is named after Congressman James Robert Mann of Illinois, and in its original form made it a felony to engage in interstate or foreign commerce transport of "any woman or girl for the purpose of prostitution or debauchery, or for any other immoral purpose". In practice, its ambiguous language about "immorality" resulted in the criminalization of some consensual sexual behavior between adults. It was amended by Congress in 1978 and again in 1986.

1912

- On January 1, the Massachusetts government enforces a law that allowed women to work a maximum of 54 hours instead of 56. Ten days later, affected workers discover that pay had been reduced along with the cut in hours.

1915

- The Supreme Court first considers the Expatriation Act of 1907 in the 1915 case MacKenzie v. Hare. The plaintiff, suffragist Ethel MacKenzie, was living in California, but was denied voter registration by the respondent in his capacity as a commissioner of the San Francisco Board of Election due to her marriage to a Scottish man. (Section 3 of the Expatriation Act of 1907 provided for loss of citizenship by American women who married aliens.) MacKenzie contended that the Expatriation Act of 1907, "if intended to apply to her, is beyond the authority of Congress", as neither the Fourteenth Amendment nor any other part of the Constitution gave Congress the power to "denationalize a citizen without his concurrence". However, Justice Joseph McKenna, writing the majority opinion, stated that while "[i]t may be conceded that a change of citizenship cannot be arbitrarily imposed, that is, imposed without the concurrence of the citizen [...] [t]he law in controversy does not have that feature. It deals with a condition voluntarily entered into, with notice of the consequences." Justice James Clark McReynolds, in a concurring opinion, stated that the case should be dismissed for lack of jurisdiction.

1918

- Margaret Sanger is charged under the New York law for disseminating information about contraception. On appeal, her conviction was reversed on the grounds that contraceptive devices could legally be promoted for the cure and prevention of disease.

1921

- The Promotion of the Welfare and Hygiene of Maternity and Infancy Act, more commonly known as the Sheppard–Towner Act, is an Act of Congress that provided federal funding for maternity and childcare. It was sponsored by Senator Morris Sheppard (D) of Texas and Representative Horace Mann Towner (R) of Iowa, and signed by President Warren G. Harding on November 23. Before its passage, most of the expansion in public health programs occurred at the state and local levels. Many factors helped its passage including the environment of the Progressive Era. Massachusetts, Connecticut, and Illinois never participated in the program. Participation in the program varied depending on states. The Act was due for renewal in 1926, but was met with increased opposition. Congress allowed the act's funding to lapse in 1929 after successful opposition by the American Medical Association, which saw the act as a socialist threat to its professional autonomy, despite the Pediatric Section of the AMA House of Delegates endorsing its renewal. The rebuking of the Pediatric Section by the full House of Delegates led to the members of the Pediatric Section establishing the American Academy of Pediatrics.

1922

- The Cable Act of 1922 is a United States federal law that reverses former immigration laws regarding marriage. Previously, a woman lost her United States citizenship if she married a foreign man, since she assumed the citizenship of her husband, a law that did not apply to United States citizen men who married foreign women. The act repealed sections 3 and 4 of the Expatriation Act of 1907, but guaranteed independent female citizenship only to women who were married to an "alien eligible to naturalization". At the time of the law's passage, Asians were not considered to be racially eligible for US citizenship. As such, the Cable Act only partially reversed previous policies and allowed women to retain their United States citizenship after marrying a foreigner who was not Asian. Thus, even after the Cable Act become effective, any woman who married an Asian alien lost her United States citizenship, just as under the previous law. The Cable Act also had other limitations: a woman could keep her United States citizenship after marrying a non-Asian alien if she stayed within the United States. However, if she married a foreigner and lived on foreign soil for two years, she could still lose her right to United States nationality.

1929

- The Sheppard–Towner Act went out of effect in 1929; it had provided federal funding for maternity and childcare.

1931

- An amendment to the Cable Act allows women to retain their citizenship if they marry an Asian person.
- Michigan: A 1931 law criminalizes abortion in Michigan except when the mother's life is in danger.

1936

- A federal appeals court rules in United States v. One Package of Japanese Pessaries that the federal government could not interfere with doctors providing contraception to their patients.

=== 1940–1969 ===
1945

- Illinois: In People ex rel. Rago v. Lipsky, 63 N.E.2d 642 (Ill. 1945), the Appellate Court of Illinois, First District, did not allow a married woman to stay registered to vote under her birth name, due to "the long-established custom, policy and rule of the common law among English-speaking peoples whereby a woman's name is changed by marriage and her husband's surname becomes as a matter of law her surname".

1946

- North Carolina: A state constitutional amendment passes, allowing women to serve on a jury.

1947

- New Jersey: The terms person, persons, and people, as well as personal pronouns, are changed to apply to both sexes.

1948

- Goesaert v. Cleary is a United States Supreme Court case in which the Court upheld a Michigan law which prohibited women from being licensed as a bartender in all cities having a population of 50,000 or more, unless their father or husband owned the establishment. The plaintiff, Valentine Goesaert, challenged the law on the ground that it infringed on the Fourteenth Amendment's Equal Protection Clause. Speaking for the majority, Justice Felix Frankfurter affirmed the judgment of the Detroit, Michigan, district court and upheld the constitutionality of the state law. The state argued that since the profession of bartending could potentially lead to moral and social problems for women, it was within the state's power to bar them from working as bartenders. Only when the owner of the bar was a sufficiently close relative to the women bartender could it be guaranteed that such immorality would not be present.
- The Women's Armed Services Integration Act (Pub.L. 80–625, 62 Stat. 356, enacted June 12, 1948) enabled women to serve as permanent, regular members of the armed forces in the Army, Navy, Marine Corps, and the recently formed Air Force. However, Section 502 of the act limited service of women by excluding them from aircraft and vessels of the Navy that might engage in combat.

1955

- Texas: It became legal for women to serve on juries in Texas.

1959

- California: In 1959 the Government Code Section 12947.5 (part of the California Fair Employment and Housing Act, passed in California) declares in part, “It shall be an unlawful employment practice for an employer to refuse to permit an employee to wear pants on account of the sex of the employee”, with exceptions only for “requiring an employee to wear a costume while that employee is portraying a specific character or dramatic role” and when good cause is shown. Thus, the standard California FEHA discrimination complaint form now includes an option for "denied the right to wear pants".

1961

- Hoyt v. Florida is an appeal by Gwendolyn Hoyt, who had killed her husband and received a jail sentence for second degree murder. Although she had suffered mental and physical abuse in her marriage, and showed neurotic, if not psychotic, behavior, an all-male jury deliberated for 25 minutes before finding her guilty, and then this appeal resulted in the ruling that Florida's law which did not require women to serve on juries was not unconstitutional.
- Ohio: In State ex rel. Krupa v. Green, the appellate court allows a married woman to register to vote in her birth name which she had openly and solely used, and been well known to use, before her marriage, and held that she could use that name as a candidate for public office.

1963

- The Equal Pay Act of 1963 is a United States federal law amending the Fair Labor Standards Act, and was aimed at abolishing wage disparity based on sex (see Gender pay gap). It was signed into law on June 10 by John F. Kennedy as part of his New Frontier Program. In passing the bill, Congress stated that sex discrimination:
  - depresses wages and living standards for employees necessary for their health and efficiency;
  - prevents the maximum utilization of the available labor resources;
  - tends to cause labor disputes, thereby burdening, affecting, and obstructing commerce;
  - burdens commerce and the free flow of goods in commerce; and
  - constitutes an unfair method of competition.

The law provides (in part) that:

No employer having employees subject to any provisions of this section [section 206 of title 29 of the United States Code] shall discriminate, within any establishment in which such employees are employed, between employees on the basis of sex by paying wages to employees in such establishment at a rate less than the rate at which he pays wages to employees of the opposite sex in such establishment for equal work on jobs[,] the performance of which requires equal skill, effort, and responsibility, and which are performed under similar working conditions, except where such payment is made pursuant to (i) a seniority system; (ii) a merit system; (iii) a system which measures earnings by quantity or quality of production; or (iv) a differential based on any other factor other than sex [...] For the first nine years of the EPA, the requirement of equal pay for equal work did not extend to persons employed in an executive, administrative or professional capacity, or as an outside salesperson. Therefore, the EPA exempted white-collar women from the protection of equal pay for equal work. In 1972, Congress enacted the Education Amendments of 1972, which amended the Fair Labor Standards Act of 1938 to expand the coverage of the EPA to these employees, by excluding the EPA from the professional workers exemption of the FLSA.

1964

- The decision in People of California v. Hernandez by the California Supreme Court brought into question the validity of the rule that mistake as to a female's age is not a defense to a statutory rape charge. The defendant was convicted of statutory rape, but the trial judge refused to allow the defendant to present evidence that the defendant had a good faith belief the female subject was of age as a defense to the charge. The defendant filed an appeal, with the sole issue being the question of whether defendant's intent and knowledge at the time of the commission of the crime mattered in determining criminal culpability. The California Supreme Court held that "a charge of statutory rape is defensible [where] criminal intent is lacking," overruling and disapproving prior decisional law holding to the contrary, particularly People v. Ratz (1896). The decision set off a flurry of discussion among academics on whether "the uniform rule in the United states [that] a mistake as to the age of a female is not a defense to the crime of statutory rape".
- Title VII of the Civil Rights Act of 1964, codified as Subchapter VI of Chapter 21 of title 42 of the United States Code, prohibits discrimination by covered employers on the basis of race, color, religion, sex or national origin. Title VII applies to and covers an employer "who has fifteen (15) or more employees for each working day in each of twenty or more calendar weeks in the current or preceding calendar year". Title VII also prohibits discrimination against an individual because of his or her association with another individual of a particular race, color, religion, sex, or national origin, such as by an interracial marriage. In very narrowly defined situations, an employer is permitted to discriminate on the basis of a protected trait where the trait is a bona fide occupational qualification (BFOQ) reasonably necessary to the normal operation of that particular business or enterprise. There are also partial and whole exceptions to Title VII for four types of employers:

- Federal government; (Comment: The proscriptions against employment discrimination under Title VII are now applicable to certain federal government offices under 42 U.S.C. Section 2000e-16)
- Federally recognized Native American tribes
- Religious groups performing work connected to the group's activities, including associated education institutions;
- Bona fide nonprofit private membership organizations.

- The Bennett Amendment is a US labor law provision in the Title VII of the Civil Rights Act of 1964, §703(h) passed to limit sex discrimination claims regarding pay to the rules in the Equal Pay Act of 1963. It says an employer can "differentiate upon the basis of sex" when it compensates employees "if such differentiation is authorized by" the Equal Pay Act.

1965

- Griswold v. Connecticut is a landmark decision of the U.S. Supreme Court, in which it ruled that the Constitution of the United States protects the liberty of married couples to buy and use contraceptives without government restriction. The case involved a Connecticut "Comstock law" that prohibited any person from using "any drug, medicinal article or instrument for the purpose of preventing conception". The court held that the statute was unconstitutional, and that its effect was "to deny disadvantaged citizens ... access to medical assistance and up-to-date information in respect to proper methods of birth control". By a vote of 7–2, the Supreme Court invalidated the law on the grounds that it violated the "right to marital privacy", establishing the basis for the right to privacy with respect to intimate practices. This and other cases view the right to privacy as "protected from governmental intrusion".
- The Equal Employment Opportunity Commission (EEOC) decides that segregated job advertising—"Help Wanted Male" and "Help Wanted Female"—was permissible because it served "the convenience of readers". Advocates for women's rights founded the National Organization for Women (NOW) in June 1966 out of frustration with the enforcement of the sex bias provisions of the Civil Rights Act and Executive Order 11375.
- New York state legislature amends its abortion-related statute to allow for more therapeutic exceptions.

1966

- Pauli Murray and Dorothy Kenyon successfully argue White v. Crook, a case in which the U.S. Court of Appeals for the Fifth Circuit ruled that women have an equal right to serve on juries.
- Mississippi: Legislature makes abortion legal in cases of rape.

1967

- Executive Order 11375, signed by President Lyndon B. Johnson on October 13, bans discrimination on the basis of sex in hiring and employment in both the United States federal workforce and on the part of government contractors.
- Johnson signs Public Law 90-130, lifting grade restrictions and strength limitations on women in the United States military. It amended 10 USC, eliminating the 2% maximum on enlisted women, and allowed female officers to be promoted to colonel or higher.
- Maryland: In Erie Exchange v. Lane, 246 Md. 55 (1967) the Court of Appeals held that a married woman can lawfully adopt an assumed name, even if it is not her birth name or the name of her lawful husband, without legal proceedings.
- Section 230.3 Abortion (Tentative draft 1959, Official draft 1962) of the American Law Institute's (ALI) Model Penal Code (MPC) is used as a model for abortion law reform legislation enacted in 13 states from 1967 to 1972. It legalized abortion to preserve the health (whether physical or mental) of the mother, if the pregnancy is due to incest or rape, or if doctors agree that there is a significant risk that the child will be born with a serious mental or physical defect.
- California, Colorado, and North Carolina: Colorado became the first state to decriminalize abortion in cases of rape, incest, or in which pregnancy would lead to permanent physical disability of the woman, and similar laws were passed in California and North Carolina.

1968

- King v. Smith is a decision in which the Supreme Court of the United States held that Aid to Families with Dependent Children (AFDC) could not be withheld because of the presence of a "substitute father" who visited a family on weekends.
- Georgia and Maryland: Georgia and Maryland reformed their abortion laws based on the American Law Institute (ALI) Model Penal Code (MPC).
- The EEOC declares age restrictions on flight attendants’ employment to be illegal sex discrimination under Title VII of the Civil Rights Act of 1964.
- Prince George's County: In 1967 Kathryn Kusner applied for a jockey license through the Maryland Racing Commission but was denied because she was a woman. Later, Judge Ernest A. Loveless of the Circuit Court of Prince George's County ordered her to be granted the license, and Kusner became the first licensed female jockey in the United States.
- Texas: The Marital Property Act of 1967, which gave married women the same property rights as their husbands, goes into effect on January 1.
- Mississippi: On June 15 a law making women eligible to serve on state court juries is signed by Governor John Bell Williams. Mississippi was the last state in America to allow this.
- California: The Southern Pacific Railroad rejected Leah Rosenfeld's claims for promotion, citing the California state law that barred women from performing the duties of station agents. On August 30, 1968, she filed suit against the State of California, the Southern Pacific Railroad, and her union, then known as the Transportation Communications International Union. On November 25, 1968, the suit against the Southern Pacific Railroad was settled and the California women's protective laws were declared unconstitutional.

1969

- Arkansas, Delaware, Kansas, and New Mexico: Arkansas, Delaware, Kansas, and New Mexico reform their abortion laws based on the American Law Institute (ALI) Model Penal Code (MPC).
- New Mexico: Legislature passes a law that made it a felony for anyone to provide a woman with an abortion unless it was needed to save her life, or because her pregnancy was a result of rape or incest.
- In the case Weeks v. Southern Bell (1969), Lorena Weeks claims that Southern Bell had violated her rights under the 1964 Civil Rights Act when they denied her application for promotion to a higher paying position because she was a woman. She won her case in 1969 after several appeals.
- The California Supreme Court rules in favor of abortion rights after hearing an appeal from Dr. Leon Belous, who had been convicted of referring a woman to someone who could provide her with an illegal abortion; California's abortion law was declared unconstitutional in People v. Belous because it was vague and denied people due process.

=== 1970–1999 ===
1970

- In 1970, Eleanor Holmes Norton represents 60 female employees of Newsweek who had filed a claim with the Equal Employment Opportunity Commission that Newsweek had a policy of only allowing men to be reporters. The women won, and Newsweek agreed to allow women to be reporters. The day the claim was filed, Newsweek's cover article was "Women in Revolt", covering the feminist movement; the article was written by a woman who had been hired on a freelance basis since there were no female reporters at the magazine.
- The Title X Family Planning Program, officially known as Public Law 91-572 or "Population Research and Voluntary Family Planning Programs", is enacted under President Richard Nixon in 1970 as part of the Public Health Service Act. It is the only federal grant program dedicated solely to providing individuals with comprehensive family planning and related preventive health services, and is legally designed to prioritize the needs of low-income families or uninsured people (including those who are not eligible for Medicaid) who might not otherwise have access to these health care services. These services are provided to low-income and uninsured individuals at reduced or no cost.
- Congress removes references to contraception from federal anti-obscenity laws.
- Schultz v. Wheaton Glass Co. is a case heard before the United States Court of Appeals for the Third Circuit. It applied the Bennett Amendment on Chapter VII of the Civil Rights Act of 1964, and helped define the limitations of equal pay for men and women. In its rulings, the court determined that a job that is "substantially equal" in terms of what the job entails, although not necessarily in title or job description, is protected by the Equal Pay Act. An employer who hires a woman to do the same job as a man but gives the job a new title in order to offer it a lesser pay is discriminating under that act.
- In Sprogis v. United Air Lines, Inc., a federal trial court rules in a female flight attendant's favor on whether airline marriage bans were illegal under Title VII. The court found that neither sex nor marital status was a bona fide occupational qualification for the flight attendant occupation. The court's ruling was upheld upon appeal.
- Women were not allowed in New York's McSorley's Old Ale House until August 10, after National Organization for Women attorneys Faith Seidenberg and Karen DeCrow filed a discrimination case against the bar in District Court and won. The two entered McSorley's in 1969, and were refused service, which was the basis for their lawsuit for discrimination. The case decision made the front page of The New York Times on June 26, 1970. The suit, Seidenberg v. McSorleys' Old Ale House established that as a public place, the bar could not violate the Equal Protection Clause of the United States Constitution. The bar was then forced to admit women, but it did so "kicking and screaming". With the ruling allowing women to be served, the bathroom became unisex, but a ladies' room was not installed until 1986.
- Hawaii, New York, Alaska and Washington repeal their abortion laws. Hawaii became the first state to legalize abortions on the request of the woman, New York repealed its 1830 law, and Washington held a referendum on legalizing early pregnancy abortions, becoming the first state to legalize abortion through a vote of the people.
- New York: On April 10, the New York Senate passes a law decriminalizing abortion in most cases. Republican Governor Nelson A. Rockefeller signed the bill into law the next day. It adds a consent provision requiring a physician to obtain the woman's consent before performing an abortion, permitted physician-provided elective abortion services within the first 24 weeks of pregnancy or to preserve her life and allowed a woman, when acting upon the advice of a duly licensed physician, to perform an "abortional act" on herself within the first 24 weeks of pregnancy or to preserve her life.
- South Carolina and Virginia reform their abortion laws based on the American Law Institute Model Penal Code.
- Illinois: "The equal protection of the laws shall not be denied or abridged on account of sex by the State or its units of local government and school districts."
- Florida: Mary Grizzle introduces and passes the Married Women Property Rights Act, giving married women in Florida, for the first time, the right to own property solely in their names and to transfer that property without their husbands' signatures.

1971

- Barring women from practicing law becomes prohibited.
- Pennsylvania: "Equality of rights under the law shall not be denied or abridged in the Commonwealth of Pennsylvania because of the sex of the individual."
- United States v. Vuitch was a United States Supreme Court abortion rights case, which held that the District of Columbia's abortion law banning the practice except when necessary for the health or life of the woman was not unconstitutionally vague.
- Reed v. Reed is an Equal Protection case in the United States in which the Supreme Court ruled that the administrators of estates cannot be named in a way that discriminates between sexes. The Supreme Court ruled for the first time in Reed v. Reed that the Equal Protection Clause of the Fourteenth Amendment prohibited differential treatment based on sex.
- Phillips v. Martin Marietta Corp. is a Supreme Court case in which the court ruled that under Title VII of the Civil Rights Act of 1964, an employer may not, in the absence of business necessity, refuse to hire women with pre-school-age children while hiring men with such children. It was the first sex discrimination case under Title VII to reach the Court.
- Virginia: "That no person shall be deprived of his life, liberty, or property without due process of law; that the General Assembly shall not pass any law impairing the obligation of contracts; and that the right to be free from any governmental discrimination upon the basis of religious conviction, race, color, sex, or national origin shall not be abridged, except that the mere separation of the sexes shall not be considered discrimination."
- Alaska repeals its statute that said inducing an abortion was a criminal offense.
- Milwaukee: After the end of Prohibition in the United States in 1933, Milwaukee did not grant women bartending licenses, unless the women were the daughters or wives of the bar's owner. In 1970, Dolly Williams filed a complaint with the state regarding this, and the Wisconsin Department of Industry, Labor, and Human Relations ordered the city to stop banning female bartenders. Milwaukee appealed against this, but in March 1971, a Madison court sided with Wisconsin and Milwaukee's common council announced that beginning April 1, 1971, gender would stop being an obstacle to obtaining a bartending license.

1972

- The common law offence of being a common scold was extant in New Jersey until struck down in 1972 (in State v. Palendrano) by Circuit Judge McGann, who found it had been subsumed in the provisions of the Disorderly Conduct Act of 1898, was bad for vagueness and offended the 14th Amendment to the US Constitution for sex discrimination. It was also opined that the punishment of ducking could amount to a corpor(e)al punishment, in which case that punishment was unlawful under the New Jersey Constitution of 1844 or since 1776.
- Under § 215 of the Social Security Act (42 USCS 415), old-age insurance benefits are computed on the basis of the wage earner's "average monthly wage" earned during their "benefit computation years," which are the "elapsed years" (reduced by five) during which their covered wages were highest. Under the pre-1972 version, the computation for old age insurance benefits was such that a woman obtained larger benefits than a man of the same age having the same earnings record. The 1972 amendment altered the formula for computing benefits so as to eliminate the previous distinction between men and women, but only as to men reaching the age of 62 in 1975 or later; it was not given retroactive application.
- For the first nine years of the Equal Pay Act of 1963, the requirement of equal pay for equal work did not extend to persons employed in an executive, administrative or professional capacity, or as an outside salesperson. Therefore, the EPA exempted white-collar women from the protection of equal pay for equal work. The Education Amendments of 1972 amended the Fair Labor Standards Act of 1938 to expand the coverage of the Equal Pay Act of 1963 to these employees, by excluding the EPA from the professional workers exemption of the FLSA.
- Connecticut: In Abele v. Markle, 351 F. Supp. 224 (D. Conn. 1972) it was ruled that a Connecticut statute prohibiting abortions, except to save the life of the mother, was unconstitutional.
- Vermont: The Vermont Supreme Court makes a ruling that effectively ended abortion restrictions in the state.
- New York: The Court of Appeals rules that Bernice Gera could be a baseball umpire.
- Washington: "Equality of rights and responsibility under the law shall not be denied or abridged on account of sex."
- Alaska: "No person is to be denied the enjoyment of any civil or political right because of race, color, creed, sex or national origin. The legislature shall implement this section."
- Title IX is a portion of the United States Education Amendments of 1972, Public Law No. 92‑318, 86 Stat. 235 (June 23, 1972), codified at 20 U.S.C. §§ 1681–1688, co-authored and introduced by Senator Birch Bayh; it was renamed the Patsy Mink Equal Opportunity in Education Act in 2002, after its late House co-author and sponsor. It states in part, "No person in the United States shall, on the basis of sex, be excluded from participation in, be denied the benefits of, or be subjected to discrimination under any education program or activity receiving federal financial assistance."
- Eisenstadt v. Baird was a United States Supreme Court case that established the right of unmarried people to possess contraception on the same basis as married couples. The Court struck down a Massachusetts law prohibiting the distribution of contraceptives to unmarried people for the purpose of preventing pregnancy, ruling that it violated the Equal Protection Clause of the Constitution.
- The 10th Circuit case Moritz v. Commissioner successfully challenged the denial of a dependent-care deduction to a single man who was a caretaker for his sick mother; the deduction had previously been limited to women, widowers, or divorced men.
- Maryland: In Stuart v. Board of Elections, on the question of whether a wife could register to vote in her birth name rather than her husband's last name, the Maryland Court of Appeals decides that "a married woman's surname does not become that of her husband where, as here, she evidences a clear intent to consistently and nonfraudulently use her birth given name subsequent to her marriage".
- Florida reformed its abortion law based on the American Law Institute Model Penal Code.
- Maryland: "Equality of rights under the law shall not be abridged or denied because of sex."
- Texas: "Equality under the law shall not be denied or abridged because of sex, race, color, creed, or national origin. This amendment is self-operative."

1973

- Roe v. Wade is a landmark decision by the Supreme Court on the issue of abortion. The court ruled 7–2 that a right to privacy under the Due Process Clause of the 14th Amendment extended to a woman's decision to have an abortion, but that this right must be balanced against the state's two legitimate interests in regulating abortions: protecting women's health and protecting the potentiality of human life.
- Doe v. Bolton is a decision of the Supreme Court overturning abortion laws in Georgia.
- Frontiero v. Richardson is a landmark United States Supreme Court case that decided benefits given by the United States military to the family of service members cannot be given out differently because of sex.
- Pittsburgh Press Co. v. Pittsburgh Commission on Human Relations was a 1973 decision of the United States Supreme Court which upheld an ordinance enacted in Pittsburgh that forbids sex-designated classified advertising for job opportunities, against a claim by the parent company of the Pittsburgh Press that the ordinance violated its First Amendment rights.
- From 1973 on, the United States Agency for International Development (USAID) has followed the Helms Amendment, banning use of U.S. government funds to provide abortion as a method of family planning anywhere in the world.
- Colorado: "Equality of rights under the law shall not be denied or abridged by the state of Colorado or any of its political subdivisions because of sex."
- Montana: "The dignity of the human being is inviolable. No person shall be denied the equal protection of the laws. Neither the state nor any person, firm, corporation, or institution shall discriminate against any person in the exercise of his civil or political rights on account of race, color, sex, culture, social origin or condition, or political or religious ideas."
- New Mexico: "No person shall be deprived of life, liberty or property without due process of law; nor shall any person be denied equal protection of the laws. Equality of rights under law shall not be denied on account of the sex of any person."
- California: In Rentzer v. Unemployment Ins. Appeals Bd., Gail Rentzer suffered from an ectopic pregnancy and was unable to work. She was denied compensation by the California Unemployment Insurance Appeals Board because they did not recognize pregnancy or related medical complications as a disability. The California Court of Appeals found that because Gail had not had a normal pregnancy and her emergency surgery was performed to stop bleeding and save her life, her pregnancy was deemed worthy of disability benefits. The case allowed women with medical complications during pregnancy to be granted benefits and more protections, such as disability coverage for not just pregnancy, but also the amount of time it takes for recovery from complications.
- The "Percy Amendment" of the Foreign Assistance Act required U.S. foreign aid to integrate women into its programs, leading to USAID's creation of its Women in Development (WID) office in 1974.
- Eighth Circuit jurisdiction: On April 18, 1973, the United States Court of Appeals for the Eighth Circuit ruled that girls could not be banned from high school sports teams for non-contact sports.

1974

- Cleveland Board of Education v. LaFleur, 414 U.S. 632 (1974), found that overly restrictive maternity leave regulations in public schools violate the Due Process Clause of the Fifth Amendment and the Fourteenth Amendment.
- Kentucky adopts a law preventing public hospitals from performing abortion procedures except to protect the life of the mother.
- Connecticut: "No person shall be denied the equal protection of the law nor be subjected to segregation or discrimination in the exercise or enjoyment of his or her civil or political rights because of religion, race, color, ancestry, national origin or sex."
- Geduldig v. Aiello is an equal protection case in which the Supreme Court ruled on whether unfavorable treatment to pregnant women could count as sex discrimination. It held that the denial of insurance benefits for work loss resulting from a normal pregnancy did not violate the Fourteenth Amendment. The California insurance program at issue did not exclude workers from eligibility based on sex but did exclude pregnancy from a list of compensable disabilities. The majority found that even though only women would be directly affected by the administrative decision, the classification of normal pregnancy as non-compensable was not a sex-based classification, and therefore the court would defer to the state so long as it could provide a rational basis for its categorization.
- The Equal Credit Opportunity Act makes it unlawful for any creditor to discriminate against any applicant, with respect to any aspect of a credit transaction, on the basis of race, color, religion, national origin, sex, marital status, or age (provided the applicant has the capacity to contract). Failure to comply with the Equal Credit Opportunity Act's Regulation B can subject a financial institution to civil liability for actual and punitive damages in individual or class actions. Liability for punitive damages can be as much as $10,000 in individual actions and the lesser of $500,000 or 1% of the creditor's net worth in class actions.
- In Kahn v. Shevin, the Supreme Court rules that a Florida statute providing property tax exemptions only to widows does not violate the Equal Protection Clause of the Fourteenth Amendment.
- In Kaplowitz v. University of Chicago, the U.S. District Court for the Northern District of Illinois rules that a law school was not required to police the discriminatory practices of employers using its placement facilities. The court found the law school an employment agency, but that employment agencies are only obligated to refer potential employees without discrimination.
- The Women's Educational Equity Act (WEEA) is one of the several landmark laws passed by the United States Congress outlining federal protections against the gender discrimination of women in education (educational equity). WEEA was enacted as Section 513 of P.L. 93-380. In 1984, Congress rewrote the WEEA legislation.
- Sex is added as a protected characteristic to the Fair Housing Act.
- New Hampshire: "All men have certain natural, essential, and inherent rights – among which are, the enjoying and defending life and liberty; acquiring, possessing, and protecting, property; and, in a word, of seeking and obtaining happiness. Equality of rights under the law shall not be denied or abridged by this state on account of race, creed, color, sex or national origin."
- Due to a lawsuit brought on behalf of Maria Pepe by the National Organization for Women, the New Jersey Superior Court decides that Little League Baseball must allow girls to play.
- In the final week of December, President Gerald Ford signs a bill that opened Little League Baseball to girls.

1975

- In Bigelow v. Virginia, the US Supreme Court rules that state bans on abortion clinics advertising their services were unconstitutional as they violated freedom of speech and freedom of the press.
- Stanton v. Stanton, is a United States Supreme Court case that struck down Utah's definitions of adulthood as a violation of equal protection: females reached adulthood at 18; males at 21.
- Weinberger v. Wiesenfeld is a decision by the United States Supreme Court. It unanimously held that the gender-based distinction under the Social Security Act of 1935—which permitted widows but not widowers to collect special benefits while caring for minor children—violated the right to equal protection secured by the Due Process Clause of the Fifth Amendment to the United States Constitution.
- Taylor v. Louisiana is a Supreme Court case that stated women could not be excluded from a venire, or jury pool, on the basis of having to register for jury duty.
- On February 19, the Texas Supreme Court's ruling in the case Jacobs v. Theimer makes it the first state in America to allow a woman to sue her doctor for a wrongful birth. The case involved Dortha Jean Jacobs (later Dortha Biggs) who caught rubella while pregnant and gave birth to Lesli, who was severely disabled. Dortha and her husband sued her doctor, saying he did not diagnose the rubella or warn them how it would affect the pregnancy.
- Schlesinger v. Ballard is a Supreme Court case that upheld a federal statute granting female naval officers four more years of commissioned service before mandatory discharge than male Naval officers. A federal statute granted female naval officers fourteen years of commissioned service while allowing only nine years of commissioned service for male naval officers before mandatory discharge. The Supreme Court held that the law passed intermediate scrutiny equal protection analysis because women, excluded from combat duty, had fewer opportunities for advancement in the military. The court found the statute to directly compensate for the past statutory barriers to advancement.
- Joan Little becomes the first woman in United States history to be acquitted using the defense that she used deadly force to resist sexual assault.
- Louisiana: "No person shall be denied the equal protection of the laws. No law shall discriminate against a person because of race or religious ideas, beliefs, or affiliations. No law shall arbitrarily, capriciously, or unreasonably discriminate against a person because of birth, age, sex, culture, physical condition, or political ideas or affiliations."
- Tennessee: In Dunn v. Palermo, the Supreme Court of Tennessee held that "in this jurisdiction a woman, upon marriage, has a freedom of choice. She may elect to retain her own surname or she may adopt the surname of her husband. The choice is hers. We hold that a person's legal name is that given at birth, or as voluntarily changed by either spouse at the time of marriage, or as changed by affirmative acts as provided under the Constitution and laws of the State of Tennessee. So long as a person's name remains constant and consistent, and unless and until changed in the prescribed manner, and absent any fraudulent or legally impermissible intent, the State has no legitimate concern."
- Wisconsin: In Kruzel v. Podell (1975), the Supreme Court of Wisconsin decided that a woman upon marriage adopts the last name of her husband by customarily using that name after marriage, but also stated that no law required her to.
- Illinois: The 79th General Assembly enacts the Illinois Abortion Law, which included a trigger law that provided that if Roe v. Wade was overturned or repealed, "the former policy of this State to prohibit abortions unless necessary for the preservation of the mother's life shall be reinstated".

1976

- In General Electric v. Gilbert, the Supreme Court ruled that it was legal for employers to exclude pregnancy-related conditions from employee sickness and accident benefits plans.
- Massachusetts: "All people are born free and equal, and have certain natural, essential, and unalienable rights; among which may be reckoned the right of enjoying and defending their lives and liberties; that of acquiring, possessing and protecting property; in fine, that of seeking and obtaining their safety and happiness. Equality under the law shall not be denied or abridged because of sex, race, color, creed or national origin."
- Bellotti v. Baird was a Supreme Court case in which it upheld a Massachusetts law requiring parental consent to a minor's abortion, which provided that "if one or both of the [minor]'s parents refuse ... consent, consent may be obtained by order of a judge ... for good cause shown." The decision was unanimous, and the opinion of the Court was written by Justice Blackmun. The law in question "permits a minor capable of giving informed consent to obtain a court order allowing abortion without parental consultation, and further permits even a minor incapable of giving informed consent to obtain an abortion order without parental consultation where it is shown that abortion would be in her best interests."
- Craig v. Boren was the first case in which a majority of the Supreme Court determined that statutory or administrative sex classifications were subject to intermediate scrutiny under the Fourteenth Amendment's Equal Protection Clause. The court also acknowledged that parties economically affected by regulations may challenge them "by acting as advocates of the rights of third parties who seek access to their market or function." The case specifically concerned over how Oklahoma passed a statute prohibiting the sale of "nonintoxicating" 3.2% beer to males under the age of 21 but allowed females over the age of 18 to purchase it. The Court held that the gender classifications made by the Oklahoma statute were unconstitutional because the statistics relied on by the state were insufficient to show a substantial relationship between the statute and the benefits intended to stem from it. This case overruled Goesaert v. Cleary.
- Planned Parenthood v. Danforth is a Supreme Court case on abortion. The plaintiffs challenged the constitutionality of a Missouri statute regulating abortion. The court upheld the right to have an abortion, declaring unconstitutional the statute's requirement of prior written consent from a parent (in the case of a minor) or a spouse (in the case of a married woman).
- The Hyde Amendment is a legislative provision barring the use of certain federal funds to pay for abortion unless the pregnancy arises from incest, rape, or to save the life of the mother. Legislation including the Hyde Amendment generally only restricts the use of funds allocated for the Department of Health and Human Services and primarily affects Medicaid.
- District of Columbia: The case Williams v. Saxbe of the U.S. District Court for the District of Columbia established sexual harassment as a form of sex discrimination when sexual advances by a male supervisor towards a female employee, if proven, would be deemed an artificial barrier to employment placed before one gender and not another.
- United States Court of Appeals for the Second Circuit jurisdiction: There was a United States Court of Appeals for the Second Circuit decision indicating involuntary pregnancy discharges in the U.S. Navy violated the 5th Amendment.
- United States Court of Appeals for the Second Circuit jurisdiction: There is a United States Court of Appeals for the Second Circuit decision indicating involuntary pregnancy discharges in the U.S. Navy violated the Fifth Amendment.

1977

- Beal v. Doe is a Supreme Court case that concerned the disbursement of federal funds in Pennsylvania, whose statute restricted federal funding to abortion clinics. The court ruled states are not required to treat abortion in the same manner as potential motherhood. The opinion of the Court left the central holding of the Roe v. Wade decision – abortion as a right – intact. The statute was upheld, with Justice Powell writing the majority opinion.
- Califano v. Webster is a decision by the Supreme Court, which held that Section 215 of the Social Security Act does not violate due process by allowing women to calculate retirement benefits without including additional low-earning years, since it is an attempt to compensate for previous discrimination.
- Califano v. Goldfarb is a decision by the Supreme Court, which held that the different treatment of men and women constituted invidious discrimination against female wage earners by affording them less protection for their surviving spouses than is provided to male employees, and therefore violated the Due Process Clause of the Fifth Amendment.
- Dothard v. Rawlinson is the first Supreme Court case in which the bona fide occupational qualifications (BFOQ) defense was used. The court held that under Title VII of the Civil Rights Act of 1964, an employer may not, in the absence of business necessity, set height and weight restrictions which have a disproportionately adverse effect on one gender. However, on the issue of whether women could fill close contact jobs in all male maximum security prisons the Court ruled 6–3 that the BFOQ defense was legitimate in this case, reasoning that female prison guards were more vulnerable to male sexual attack than male prison guards.
- Carey v. Population Services International is a Supreme Court case in which the court held that it was unconstitutional to prohibit anyone other than a licensed pharmacist to distribute nonprescription contraceptives to persons 16 years of age or over, to prohibit the distribution of nonprescription contraceptives by any adult to minors under 16 years of age, and to prohibit anyone, including licensed pharmacists, to advertise or display contraceptives.
- The National Partnership for Women & Families wins Barnes v. Costle, a U.S. Court of Appeals decision that held that any retaliation by a boss against an employee for rejecting sexual advances violates Title VII's prohibition against sex discrimination.
- Washington: The January 7 Supreme Court ruling in State of Washington v. Wanrow is a landmark ruling. The Washington Supreme Court, sitting en banc, declared that Yvonne Wanrow was entitled to have a jury consider her actions in the light of her "perceptions of the situation, including those perceptions which were the product of our nation's long and unfortunate history of sex discrimination". The ruling was the first in America recognizing the particular legal problems of women who defend themselves or their children from male attackers, and was again affirmed by the Washington Supreme Court in denying the prosecutor's petition for rehearing in 1979. Before the Wanrow decision, standard jury instructions asked what a "reasonably prudent man" would have done, even if the accused was a woman; the Wanrow decision set a precedent that when a woman is tried in a criminal trial the juries should ask "what a reasonably prudent woman similarly situated would have done."
- In Coker v. Georgia, the Supreme Court determines that the death penalty for rape of an adult woman was grossly disproportionate and excessive punishment, and therefore unconstitutional under the Eighth Amendment.
- New York: Cathy Davis sues the New York State Athletic Commission (NYSAC) in 1977 because she was denied a boxing license due to her being a woman, and the case was decided in her favor later that year, with the judge invalidating New York State rule number 205.15, which stated, “No woman may be licensed as a boxer or second or licensed to compete in any wrestling exhibition with men.” In his opinion the judge cited the precedent set by Garrett v. New York State Athletic Commission (1975), which “found the regulation invalid under the equal protection clauses of the State and Federal Constitutions”. The NYSAC filed an appeal of the ruling, but withdrew it later.

1978

- Hawaii: "Equality of rights under the law shall not be denied or abridged by the State on account of sex. The legislature shall have the power to enforce, by appropriate legislation, the provisions of this section."
- The Pregnancy Discrimination Act of 1978 is a United States federal statute. It amended Title VII of the Civil Rights Act of 1964 to "prohibit sex discrimination on the basis of pregnancy". It covers discrimination "on the basis of pregnancy, childbirth, or related medical conditions", but only applies to employers with 15 or more employees. Employers are exempt from providing medical coverage for elective abortions – except in the case that the mother's life is threatened – but are required to provide disability and sick leave for women who are recovering from an abortion.
- Judge John Sirica ruled the law banning Navy women from ships to be unconstitutional in the case Owens v. Brown. That same year, Congress approved a change to Title 10 USC Section 6015 to permit the Navy to assign women to fill sea duty billets on support and noncombatant ships.
- The Mann Act originally made it a felony to engage in interstate or foreign commerce transport of "any woman or girl for the purpose of prostitution or debauchery, or for any other immoral purpose". In 1978, Congress updated the Mann Act's definition of "transportation" and added protections against commercial sexual exploitation for minors.
- The federal lawsuit, Melissa Ludtke and Time, Inc., Plaintiffs, v. Bowie Kuhn, Commissioner of Baseball et al. (1978) is credited with giving equal access to Major League Baseball locker rooms to women sports reporters. In 1977, Ludtke sued the baseball commission on the basis that her 14th amendment rights were violated when she was denied access to the New York Yankees clubhouse while reporting on the 1977 World Series. She won the lawsuit; the District Court for the Southern District of New York stated her right was violated since the New York Yankees clubhouse was controlled by New York City. It also stated that her fundamental right to pursue a career was violated based on her sex.
- The 1887 Edmunds–Tucker Act is repealed.
- Akron, Ohio, passes a city ordinance that restricts abortion rights.

1979

- The Supreme Court ruled in Califano v. Westcott that two-parent families with an unemployed mother are entitled to Aid to Families with Dependent Children benefits.
- Bellotti v. Baird is a Supreme Court case that ruled that teenagers do not have to secure parental consent to obtain an abortion. The court elaborates on its parental consent decision in 1976. It implies that states may be able to require a pregnant, unmarried minor to obtain parental consent to an abortion so long as the state law provides an alternative procedure to parental approval, such as letting the minor seek a state judge's approval instead. This plurality opinion declined to fully extend the right to seek and obtain an abortion, granted to adult women in Roe v. Wade, to minors. The Court rejected this extension to minors by placing emphasis on the especially vulnerable nature of children, their "inability to make critical decisions in an informed and mature manner; and the importance of the parental role in child rearing".
- Colautti v. Franklin is a Supreme Court abortion rights case, which held part of Pennsylvania's 1974 Abortion Control Act as void for vagueness; that part stated, "Every person who performs or induces an abortion shall prior thereto have made a determination based on his experience, judgment or professional competence that the fetus is not viable, and if the determination is that the fetus is viable or if there is sufficient reason to believe that the fetus may be viable, shall exercise that degree of professional skill, care and diligence to preserve the life and health of the fetus which such person would be required to exercise in order to preserve the life and health of any fetus intended to be born and not aborted and the abortion technique employed shall be that which would provide the best opportunity for the fetus to be aborted alive so long as a different technique would not be necessary in order to preserve the life or health of the mother."
- Personnel Administrator of Massachusetts v. Feeney is a case heard by the Supreme Court. Its decision upheld the constitutionality of a state law, giving hiring preference to veterans over nonveterans. The law was challenged as violating the Equal Protection Clause of the Fourteenth Amendment by a woman, who argued that the law discriminated on the basis of sex because so few women were veterans.
- Duren v. Missouri is a Supreme Court case in which it ruled that the exemption on request of women from jury service under Missouri law, resulting in an average of less than 15% women on jury venires in the forum county, violated the "fair-cross-section" requirement of the Sixth Amendment as made applicable to the States by the Fourteenth Amendment.
- Cannon v. University of Chicago is a Supreme Court case which interpreted Congressional silence in the face of earlier interpretations of similar laws to determine that Title IX of the Higher Education Act provides an implied cause of action.
- A lawsuit makes California change its boxing regulations, which had limited women boxers to no more than four rounds.
- Missouri: A court found that state law dealing with women having abortions after the first trimester needing to have it performed in a hospital was unconstitutional.

1980

- Kentucky adopts a law preventing public hospitals from performing abortion procedures except to protect the life of the mother. The law was later ruled unconstitutional by the Sixth Circuit Court of Appeals, but the state legislature passed a new version of the law in 1980.
- Shyamala Rajender v. University of Minnesota is a landmark class action lawsuit dealing with sexual discrimination at an American university. The case was filed on September 5, 1973, by Shyamala Rajender, an assistant professor of chemistry at the University of Minnesota. Rajender accused the university of engaging in employment discrimination on the basis of sex and national origin after she was turned down for a tenure-track position, despite being recommended for the position by several university committees. The suit was certified as a class action by the United States District Court for the District of Minnesota in 1978. After eleven weeks of trial, the suit was settled in 1980 by a consent decree. Rajender received $100,000 and Judge Miles Lord enjoined the university from discriminating against women on the basis of sex.
- Harris v. McRae is a case in which the Supreme Court held that states that participated in Medicaid were not required to fund medically necessary abortions for which federal reimbursement was unavailable as a result of the Hyde Amendment, which restricted the use of federal funds for abortion. It also held that the funding restrictions of the Hyde Amendment did not violate either the Fifth Amendment or the Establishment Clause of the First Amendment.
- Alexander v. Yale is the first use of Title IX in charges of sexual harassment against an educational institution. It established that sexual harassment of female students could be considered sex discrimination, and was thus illegal.
- In William v. Zbaraz, the United States Supreme Court upheld that states could constitutionally make their own versions of the anti-abortion Hyde Amendment, and that states/the federal government have no statutory or constitutional obligation to fund medically necessary abortions.

1981

- Kirchberg v. Feenstra is a Supreme Court case in which it decided that a Louisiana Head and Master law, which gave sole control of marital property to the husband, unconstitutional.
- H. L. v. Matheson is a Supreme Court abortion rights case, according to which a state may require a doctor to inform a teenaged girl's parents before performing an abortion or face criminal penalty.
- Rostker v. Goldberg is a decision of the Supreme Court proclaiming that the practice of requiring only men to register for the draft was constitutional. In a 6–3 decision, the Supreme Court held that this gender distinction was not a violation of the equal protection component of the due process clause, and that the Act would stand as passed.
- Bundy v. Jackson is a D.C. Circuit opinion, written by J. Skelly Wright, that held that workplace sexual harassment could constitute employment discrimination under the Civil Rights Act of 1964.
- Michael M. v. Superior Court of Sonoma County is a Supreme Court case over the issue of gender bias in statutory rape laws. The petitioner argued that the statutory rape law discriminated based on gender and was unconstitutional. The court ruled otherwise, claiming that sexual intercourse entails a higher risk for women than men, and it found the law just in targeting men as the only possible perpetrators of statutory rape.
- The version of the Hyde Amendment enforced from 1981 until 1993 prohibited the use of federal funds for abortions "except where the life of the mother would be endangered if the fetus were carried to term."
- The Supreme Court determines in County of Washington v. Gunther that the Bennett Amendment explicitly incorporated only limited defenses to unequal pay due to sex and did not otherwise bar suits based on a comparison of payment for different jobs. Nevertheless, it has continued to be used to bar comparable worth suits in lower courts.

1982

- Mississippi University for Women v. Hogan is a case decided 5–4 by the Supreme Court, determining that the single-sex admissions policy of the Mississippi University for Women violated the Equal Protection Clause of the Fourteenth Amendment.
- Chrapliwy v. Uniroyal, Inc. is a US labor law decision of the U.S. Seventh Circuit Court of Appeals concerning the award of attorney's fees in a discrimination lawsuit. The case involved allegedly discriminatory practices in violation of Title VII of the Civil Rights Act of 1964. The case settled in favor of the plaintiffs, but litigants brought the issue of reasonable attorney's fees to the district court. Chrapliwy v. Uniroyal, Inc. found that the reasonable attorney's fees are recoverable for time spent persuading the federal government to debar a defendant from its contracts when engaging in discriminatory practices.
- New York City: After Brenda Berkman's requests for a firefighting test that was fairer for women were ignored, she filed Brenda Berkman, et al. v. The City of New York and won. A new test was created in which standards were changed so the test was job-related and Brenda with 40 other women passed to enter the fire academy in 1982.
- Pennsylvania: The Abortion Control Act is passed by the state government. It required women seeking abortions to wait 24 hours before getting an abortion, and required informed consent of parents for minor children and husbands for married women.

1983

- Kentucky: The 1981 unlawful abortion conviction of a Wayne County, Kentucky, man puts the issue of abortion before the Kentucky Supreme Court. In 1983, the court ruled that the seven-month-old fetus killed by the man during an attack on his wife could not be defined as a person under the Model Penal Code.
- City of Akron v. Akron Center for Reproductive Health is a case in which the Supreme Court affirmed its abortion rights jurisprudence. The case, decided June 15, 1983, struck down an Ohio abortion law with several provisions.
- Philadelphia County, Pennsylvania: After 139 years of being an all-male public high school, Central's all-male policy is challenged by Susan Vorchheimer, who wished to be admitted to Central. On August 7, 1975, U.S. District Court Judge Clarence C. Newcomer ruled that Central must admit academically qualified girls starting in the fall term of 1975. The decision was appealed, and the Third Circuit Court ruled that Central had the right to retain its present status. The case eventually reached the U.S. Supreme Court (in Vorchheimer v. School Dist. of Philadelphia) that, on April 19, 1977, upheld the Third Circuit Court's verdict by a 4 to 4 vote with one abstention. However, in August 1983, Judge William M. Marutani of the Philadelphia County Court of Common Pleas, ruled that the single-sex admission policy was unconstitutional. The Board of Education voted not to appeal the legal decision, thereby admitting girls to Central High School.
- Washington removes its marital exemptions for first-degree rape and second-degree rape in 1983.

1984

- California: In July 1984, the California Courts of Appeal overturned Superior Court of Los Angeles County judge Eli Chernow, ruling that fetuses could not be buried as human remains in the Los Angeles fetus disposal scandal.
- The Supreme Court's 1984 ruling Grove City College v. Bell determines that Title IX applied only to those programs receiving direct federal aid. The case reached the Supreme Court when Grove City College disagreed with the Department of Education's assertion that it was required to comply with Title IX. Grove City College was not a federally funded institution, but they accepted students who were receiving Basic Educational Opportunity Grants through a Department of Education program. The Department of Education's stance was that, because some of its students were receiving federal grants, the school was receiving federal assistance and Title IX applied to it. The court decided that since Grove City College was only receiving federal funding through the grant program, only that program had to be in compliance. The decision classified many institutions' sports programs outside Title IX's rule, reducing its scope.
- Roberts v. United States Jaycees is an opinion of the Supreme Court overturning the United States Court of Appeals for the Eighth Circuit's application of a Minnesotan antidiscrimination law, which had permitted the United States Junior Chamber (Jaycees) to exclude women from full membership.
- People v. Pointer is a criminal law case from the California Court of Appeal, First District, where the trial judge included in his sentencing a prohibition on the defendant becoming pregnant during her period of probation. The appellate court held that such a prohibition was outside the bounds of a judge's sentencing authority. The case was remanded for resentencing to undo the overly broad prohibition against conception.
- In Tallon v. Liberty Hose Co. No. 1 (Pa. Super. Ct. 1984), a case concerning sex discrimination, it is ruled that a volunteer fire department may be held liable under section 1983 for violating a plaintiff's constitutional rights.
- In Hishon v. King & Spaulding, a case in which a woman claimed that her failure to be promoted to partner at a law firm was due to her gender, the Supreme Court rules that Title VII of the Civil Rights Act of 1964 bans discrimination by employers in the context of any contractual employer/employee relationship, including but not limited to law partnerships.
- New York: In People v. Liberta, judge Sol Wachtler states that "a marriage license should not be viewed as a license for a husband to forcibly rape his wife with impunity. A married woman has the same right to control her own body as does an unmarried woman".
- The "Mexico City Policy" was instituted, and it directed the United States Agency for International Development (USAID) to withhold USAID funds from NGOs that use non-USAID funds to engage in a wide range of activities, including providing advice, counseling, or information regarding abortion, or lobbying a foreign government to legalize or make abortion available.

1985

- Indianapolis, Indiana: American Booksellers Ass'n, Inc. v. Hudnut is a court case that successfully challenged the constitutionality of the Antipornography Civil Rights Ordinance, as enacted in the city the previous year. Judge Frank Easterbrook, writing for the court, held that the ordinance's definition and prohibition of "pornography" was unconstitutional. The ordinance did not refer to the prurient interest, as required of obscenity statutes by the Supreme Court in Miller v. California, but defined pornography by reference to its portrayal of women, which the court held was unconstitutional, as "the First Amendment means that government has no power to restrict expression because of its message [or] its ideas".

1986

- The 1986 Kentucky General Assembly passes legislation requiring parental consent for minors seeking abortions. The law required the consent of only the custodial parent if the parents did not live together, and also allowed the minor to petition a district or circuit court for permission.
- Connecticut: The "Thurman Law" (aka the Family Violence Prevention and Response Act) makes domestic violence an automatically arrestable offense, even if the victim did not wish to press charges.
- Thornburgh v. American College of Obstetricians and Gynecologists is a Supreme Court case involving a challenge to Pennsylvania's Abortion Control Act of 1982. In this case the American College of Obstetricians and Gynecologists sought an injunction to all enforcement of the Pennsylvania law. Although the law in question was similar to the one in City of Akron v. Akron Center for Reproductive Health, in Thornburgh the Reagan administration asked the justices to overrule Roe v. Wade. Justice Blackmun's opinion for the court rejected this position, reaffirming Roe.
- Meritor Savings Bank v. Vinson marks the Supreme Court's recognition of certain forms of sexual harassment as a violation of Civil Rights Act of 1964's Title VII, and established the standards for analyzing whether conduct was unlawful and when an employer would be liable.
- The Mann Act originally made it a felony to engage in interstate or foreign commerce transport of "any woman or girl for the purpose of prostitution or debauchery, or for any other immoral purpose". In 1978, Congress updated its definition of "transportation" and added protections against commercial sexual exploitation for minors. In 1986 it was further amended to replace the ambiguous "debauchery" and "any other immoral purpose" with the more specific "any sexual activity for which any person can be charged with a criminal offense" as well as to make it gender-neutral.
- In Alabama, the marital exemption from the rape law is found unconstitutional in Merton v. State.
- District of Columbia: Women gain the right to go topless.
- Rhode Island: "No person shall be deprived of life, liberty or property without due process of law, nor shall any person be denied equal protection of the laws. No otherwise qualified person shall, solely by reason of race, gender or handicap be subject to discrimination by the state, its agents or any person or entity doing business with the state. Nothing in this section shall be construed to grant or secure any right relating to abortion or the funding thereof."

1987

- California Federal S. & L. Assn. v. Guerra is a Supreme Court case about whether a state may require employers to provide greater pregnancy benefits than required by federal law, as well as the ability to require pregnancy benefits to women without similar benefits to men. The court held that The California Fair Employment and Housing Act in 12945(b)(2), which requires employers to provide leave and reinstatement to employees disabled by pregnancy, is consistent with federal law.
- In 1976, the Rotary Club of Duarte in Duarte, California, admitted three women as members. After the club refused to remove the women from membership, Rotary International revoked the club's charter in 1978. The Duarte club filed suit in the California courts, claiming that Rotary Clubs are business establishments subject to regulation under California's Unruh Civil Rights Act, which bans discrimination based on race, gender, religion or ethnic origin. Rotary International then appealed the decision to the U.S. Supreme Court. On 4 May 1987, it confirmed the Californian decision supporting women, in the case Board of Directors, Rotary International v. Rotary Club of Duarte. Rotary International then removed the gender requirements from its requirements for club charters, and most clubs in most countries have opted to include women as members of Rotary Clubs.
- Johnson v. Transportation Agency is the only United States Supreme Court case to address a sex-based affirmative action plan in the employment context. The Court found that the plan did not violate the protection against discrimination on the basis of sex in the Civil Rights Act of 1964's Title VII.

1988

- Arkansas: An amendment to the state constitution says, "The policy of Arkansas is to protect the life of every unborn child from conception until birth, to the extent permitted by the Federal Constitution."
- The Civil Rights Restoration Act of 1987 is passed, which extended Title IX of the Civil Rights Act of 1964 coverage to all programs of any educational institution that receives any federal assistance, both direct and indirect.
- Bellingham, Washington: A version of the Antipornography Civil Rights Ordinance was passed in Bellingham, Washington; however, the American Civil Liberties Union filed suit against the city of Bellingham after the ordinance was passed, and the federal court struck the law down on First Amendment grounds.
- H.R.5050 – Women's Business Ownership Act of 1988: The Women's Business Ownership Act was passed in 1988 with the help of the National Association of Women Business Owners (NAWBO). The Act was created to address the needs of women in business by giving women entrepreneurs better recognition, additional resources, and by eliminating discriminatory lending practices by banks that favored male business owners over female. The bill was signed into law by President Ronald Reagan. Among other things, it put an end to state laws that required women to have male relatives sign business loans.
- Illinois: Stallman v. Youngquist, 531 N.E.2d 355, 359-61 (Ill. 1988) was a court case refusing to recognize the tort of maternal prenatal negligence, holding that granting fetuses legal rights in this manner "would involve an unprecedented intrusion into the privacy and autonomy of the [state's female] citizens".

1989

- Webster v. Reproductive Health Services is a Supreme Court decision on July 3 upholding a Missouri law that imposed restrictions on the use of state funds, facilities, and employees in performing, assisting with, or counseling on abortions. The Supreme Court in Webster allowed for states to legislate in an area that had previously been thought to be forbidden under Roe v. Wade.
- Price Waterhouse v. Hopkins is a case overseen by the United States Supreme Court on the issue of employer liability for sex discrimination. The decision established that gender stereotyping is actionable as sex discrimination, and that mixed-motive framework as an evidentiary framework for proving discrimination under a disparate treatment theory even when lawful reasons for the adverse employment action are also present.
- The first "Restroom Equity" Act in the United States is passed in California in 1989. It was introduced by then-Senator Arthur Torres after several long waits for his wife to return from the bathroom.

1990

- District of Columbia: In re A.C., 573 A.2d 1235 (1990), was a District of Columbia Court of Appeals case. It was the first American appellate court case decided against a forced Caesarean section, although the decision was issued after the fatal procedure was performed. Physicians performed a Caesarean section upon patient Angela Carder (née Stoner) without informed consent in an unsuccessful attempt to save the life of her baby. The case stands as a landmark in United States case law establishing the rights of informed consent and bodily integrity for pregnant women.
- New Jersey: The New Jersey Supreme Court ruled that Princeton's all-male eating clubs would have to open to women.
- Hodgson v. Minnesota is a Supreme Court abortion rights case that dealt with whether a state law may require notification of both parents before a minor can obtain an abortion. The law in question provided a judicial alternative. The law was declared valid with the judicial bypass, but the ruling struck down the two-parent notification requirement.
- Nevada: In 1990, Nevada voters approved Question 7 to affirm statute Nevada Revised Statutes Chapter 442, section 250 (which permits abortion up to 24 weeks gestation) by 63.5 percent of the vote. With the affirmation, the Nevada Legislature may not in any way alter that statute, unless it is first repealed by the state voters in a direct vote.

1991

- Rust v. Sullivan is a Supreme Court case decided in 1991 that found restrictions on funding with regard to abortion counseling to be constitutionally permissible.
- The Civil Rights Act of 1991 added provisions to Title VII protections including expanding the rights of women to sue and collect compensatory and punitive damages for sexual discrimination or harassment.
- United Automobile Workers v. Johnson Controls, Inc. is a decision by the Supreme Court establishing that private sector policies which allow men but not women to knowingly work in potentially hazardous occupations is gender discrimination and violates Title VII of the 1964 Civil Rights Act as amended by the Pregnancy Discrimination Act of 1978. At the time the case was heard, it was considered one of the most important sex-discrimination cases since the passage of Title VII.
- In Robinson v. Jacksonville Shipyards, Inc., a Florida district court judge rules that "pictures of nude and partially nude women" placed throughout the workplace do constitute sexual harassment.
- The case of Ellison v. Brady (US Court of Appeals for the Ninth Circuit – 924 F.2d 872 (9th Cir. 1991)) resulted in rejecting the reasonable person standard in favor of the "reasonable woman standard" in sexual harassment cases which allowed for such cases to be analyzed from the perspective of the complainant and not the defendant.

1992

- Planned Parenthood v. Casey is a case decided by the Supreme Court in which the constitutionality of several Pennsylvania statutory provisions regarding abortion were challenged. It differed from Roe v. Wade by tying an abortion's legality to the third trimester, associating the legal timeframe with fetal viability.
- In R.A.V. v. City of St. Paul, the United States Supreme Court overturns a statute prohibiting speech or symbolic expression that "arouses anger, alarm or resentment in others on the basis of race, color, creed, religion or gender" on the grounds that, even if the specific statute was limited to fighting words, it was unconstitutionally content-based and viewpoint-based because of the limitation to race-/religion-/sex-based fighting words. The Court, however, made it repeatedly clear that the city could have pursued "any number" of other avenues, and reaffirmed the notion that "fighting words" could be properly regulated by municipal or state governments.
- New York State: In 1986, seven women who picnicked topless are charged in Rochester, New York with baring "that portion of the breast which is below the top of the areola". That law had originally been enacted to discourage 'topless' waitresses. The women were initially convicted, but on appeal two of the women's charges were reversed by the New York State Court of Appeals in 1992 on equal protection grounds in Santorelli's case.
- Franklin v. Gwinnett County Public Schools is a United States Supreme Court Case in which the Court decided, in a unanimous vote, that monetary relief is available under Title IX.
- Massachusetts: On 16 April 1992, after eight years in court litigation in Massachusetts, Gail Grandchamp gained the right to become a boxer, as a state Superior Court judge deemed it was illegal to deny someone a chance to box based on gender.

1993

- Maine passed abortion-related legislation that said women have the right to "terminate a pregnancy before viability".
- Harris v. Forklift Systems, Inc. is a case in which the Supreme Court clarified the definition of a "hostile" or "abusive" work environment under Title VII of the Civil Rights Act of 1964. In a unanimous opinion written by Justice Sandra Day O'Connor, the court decided that a determination about whether a work environment is hostile or abusive requires a consideration of all relevant circumstances.
- Bray v. Alexandria Women's Health Clinic is a Supreme Court case in which the court determined that 42 U.S.C. 1985(3) does not provide a federal cause of action against persons obstructing access to abortion clinics. Several abortion clinics (most known was the Alexandria Health Clinic) sued to prevent Jayne Bray and other anti-abortion protesters from voicing their freedom of speech in front of the clinics in Washington D.C. Alexandria Women's Health Clinic reported that the protesters violated 42 U.S.C. 1985(3), which prohibits protests to deprive "any person or class of persons of the equal protection of the laws, or of equal privileges and immunities under the laws."
- The Mexico City policy is rescinded by President Bill Clinton.
- On October 22, Clinton signs into law the Departments of Labor, Health and Human Services, and Education, and Related Agencies Appropriations Act, 1994. It contained a new version of the Hyde Amendment that expanded the category of abortions for which federal funds are available under Medicaid to include cases of rape and incest.
- The Family and Medical Leave Act of 1993 is a United States federal law requiring covered employers to provide employees job-protected and unpaid leave for qualified medical and family reasons. Qualified medical and family reasons include: personal or family illness, family military leave, pregnancy, adoption, or the foster care placement of a child.
- All states had either withdrawn exemptions used to legalize marital rape, with the last states to do so being Oklahoma and North Carolina.
- Utah: In Beynon v. St. George-Dixie Lodge 1743, the Utah Supreme Court ruled that while Freedom of Association allowed the Elks to remain a men-only organization, "the Elks may not avail itself of the benefits of a liquor license and the license's concomitant state regulation" as long as it violated the Utah State Civil Rights Act. Faced with losing their liquor licenses if they did not admit women, the Elks Lodges of Utah voted to become unisex in June, which was followed by a vote at the Elks National Convention in July 1995 to remove the word male from the national membership requirements.

1994

- Illinois: In re Baby Boy Doe, 632 N.E.2d 326 (Ill. App. Ct. 1994) was a court case holding that courts may not balance whatever rights a fetus may have against the rights of a competent woman, whose choice to refuse medical treatment as invasive as a Cesarean section must be honored even if the choice may be harmful to the fetus.
- Madsen v. Women's Health Center, Inc. is a Supreme Court case where petitioners challenged the constitutionality of an injunction entered by a Florida state court which prohibits anti-abortion protesters from demonstrating in certain places and in various ways outside of a health clinic that performs abortions. Its findings partly affirmed and reversed the judgment of the Florida Supreme Court.
- The Violence Against Women Act of 1994 is a United States federal law signed by Clinton on September 13. It provided $1.6 billion towards the investigation and prosecution of violent crimes against women, imposes automatic and mandatory restitution on those convicted, and allows civil redress in cases prosecutors chose to leave un-prosecuted. The Act also establishes the Office on Violence Against Women within the Department of Justice.
- In 1994, the Equity in Athletics Disclosure Act, sponsored by congresswoman Cardiss Collins, mandates federally assisted higher education institutions to disclose information on roster sizes for men's and women's teams, as well as budgets for recruiting, scholarships, coaches' salaries, and other expenses, annually.
- J. E. B. v. Alabama ex rel. T. B. is a case in which the Supreme court decided that making peremptory challenges based solely on a prospective juror's sex is unconstitutional. J.E.B. extended the court's existing precedent in Batson v. Kentucky, which found race-based peremptory challenges in criminal trials unconstitutional, and Edmonson v. Leesville Concrete Company, which extended that principle to civil trials. As in Batson, the court found that sex-based challenges violate the Equal Protection Clause.
- The Freedom of Access to Clinic Entrances Act is a United States law that was signed by Clinton in May, which included the prohibition of physical force, threat of physical force, or physical obstruction to impede or harm anyone who is obtaining or providing reproductive health services, and prohibiting the intentional damage or destruction of a reproductive health care facility.

1995

- The 89th Illinois General Assembly enacts the Parental Notice of Abortion Act, which required physicians to give 48 hours' notice to the parent, grandparent or guardian of a minor seeking an abortion. However, the law was enjoined by the courts for more than two decades.
- Women in Columbus, Ohio, gain the right to go topless.
- The Violent Crime Control and Law Enforcement Act requires the United States Sentencing Commission to increase the penalties for hate crimes committed on the basis of the actual or perceived gender, race, color, religion, national origin, or ethnicity of any person. In 1995, the Sentencing Commission implemented these guidelines, which only apply to federal crimes.

1996

- Fauziya Kasinga, a 19-year-old member of the Tchamba-Kunsuntu tribe of Togo, is granted asylum in 1996 after leaving an arranged marriage to escape female genital mutilation, setting a precedent in U.S. immigration law as it was the first time the practice was accepted as a form of persecution. It was the first situation in which asylum was granted based on gender.
- United States v. Virginia was a landmark case in which the Supreme Court struck down the Virginia Military Institute's long-standing male-only admission policy in a 7–1 decision.
- The Newborns' and Mothers' Health Protection Act is a piece of legislation relating to the coverage of maternity by health insurance plans in the United States of America. It is signed into law on September 26 and requires plans that offer maternity coverage to pay for at least a 48-hour hospital stay following childbirth (96-hour stay in the case of a caesarean section).
- California: "The State shall not discriminate against, or grant preferential treatment to, any individual or group on the basis of race, sex, color, ethnicity, or national origin in the operation of public employment, public education, or public contracting."

1997

- Illinois: In re Fetus Brown, 689 N.E.2d 397, 400 (Ill. App. Ct. 1997) was a court case overturning a court-ordered blood transfusion of a pregnant woman.
- New Hampshire: Governor Jeanne Shaheen signs legislation that repealed most of the abortion restrictions in place in the state.
- Kansas: State legislature passed the Woman's Right to Know Act, which requires, except in the case of a medical emergency, a 24-hour period between the time that the woman is informed in writing of legally-required information and the abortion.
- The Campus Hate Crimes Right to Know Act of 1997 enacted 20 U.S.C. § 1092(f)(1)(F)(ii), which requires campus security authorities to collect and report data on hate crimes committed on the basis of gender, race, religion, sexual orientation, ethnicity, or disability.
- The Federal Prohibition of Female Genital Mutilation Act is enacted.
- Schenck v. Pro-Choice Network of Western New York was a case heard before the Supreme Court related to legal protection of access to abortion. It ruled in an 8–1 decision that "floating buffer zones" preventing protesters approaching people entering or leaving abortion clinics were unconstitutional, though "fixed buffer zones" around the clinics themselves remained constitutional.
- The Domestic Violence Offender Gun Ban, often called "the Lautenberg Amendment", is an amendment to the Omnibus Consolidated Appropriations Act of 1997, enacted by the 104th United States Congress in 1996, which bans access to firearms by people convicted of crimes of domestic violence.
- Yeaw v. Boy Scouts of America was a high-profile case filed in 1997 before the Supreme Court of California to determine whether the Boy Scouts of America is a business establishment within the meaning of the Unruh Civil Rights Act (Civ. Code, § 51) and does not have the right to exclude girls from membership. It was determined The Boy Scouts of America are not considered a "business establishment" and do not fall under the provisions of California's Unruh Civil Rights Act.
- Gloria Allred represented Melrose Place actress Hunter Tylo in 1997 when producer Aaron Spelling fired her because she was pregnant. A jury awarded Tylo $4.8 million. The case set a precedent for actors to continue work if they become pregnant.
- Montana: In 1997, the state legislature passes a law that said only physicians could perform abortions. After a lawsuit, they changed the law to allow nurse practitioners to perform abortions.

1998

- The Kentucky General Assembly passes legislation that required clinics to have an Abortion Clinic License if they wanted to operate. Part of this was a requirement for a transfer agreement between the clinic and a hospital and ambulance.
- Iowa: "All men and women are, by nature, free and equal and have certain inalienable rights—among which are those of enjoying and defending life and liberty, acquiring, possessing and protecting property, and pursuing and obtaining safety and happiness."
- Florida: "Basic rights. All natural persons, female and male alike, are equal before the law and have inalienable rights, among which are the right to enjoy and defend life and liberty, to pursue happiness, to be rewarded for industry, and to acquire, possess and protect property; except that the ownership, inheritance, disposition and possession of real property by aliens ineligible for citizenship may be regulated or prohibited by law. No person shall be deprived of any right because of race, religion, national origin, or physical disability."
- Women in Moscow, Idaho, gained the right to go topless.
- Faragher v. City of Boca Raton was a Supreme Court case in which it identified the circumstances under which an employer may be held liable under Title VII of the Civil Rights Act of 1964 for the acts of a supervisory employee whose sexual harassment of subordinates has created a hostile work environment amounting to employment discrimination. The court held that "an employer is vicariously liable for actionable discrimination caused by a supervisor, but subject to an affirmative defense looking to the reasonableness of the employer's conduct as well as that of a plaintiff victim."
- Burlington Industries, Inc. v. Ellerth is a landmark employment law case of the Supreme Court that held employers liable if supervisors create a hostile work environment for employees. The case also introduced a two-part affirmative defense allowing employers to avoid sex discrimination liability if they follow best practices.
- Lois E. Jenson v. Eveleth Taconite Co. is the first class-action sexual harassment lawsuit in the United States. It was filed on behalf of Lois Jenson and other female workers at the EVTAC mine in Eveleth, Minnesota. On December 23, 1998, just before the trial was set to begin, fifteen women settled with Eveleth Mines for a total of $3.5 million.
- Miller v. Albright is a Supreme Court case in which the court upheld the validity of laws relating to U.S. citizenship at birth for children born outside the United States, out of wedlock, to an American parent. The Court declined to overturn a more restrictive citizenship requirement applying to an illegitimate foreign-born child of an American father, as opposed to a child born to an American mother under similar circumstances.
- In Gebser v. Lago Vista Independent School District, the Supreme Court rules that in order for a party to recover sexual harassment damages under Title IX of the Education Amendments of 1972, they must show that a school district official knew what was happening and was able to take measures to correct it if they wished, and that the educational establishment deliberately failed to respond properly.
- Oncale v. Sundowner Offshore Services is a case overseen by the Supreme Court. It claimed sex discrimination by a male oil-rig worker, who stated that he was repeatedly subjected to sexual harassment by his male co-workers with the acquiescence of his employer. The Court held that Title VII's protection against workplace discrimination "because of... sex" applied to harassment in the workplace between members of the same sex.

1999

- A United States House of Representatives appropriations bill (HR 2490) that contained an amendment specifically permitting breastfeeding was signed into law on September 29, 1999. It stipulated that no government funds may be used to enforce any prohibition on women breastfeeding their children in federal buildings or on federal property.
- A federal law enacted in 1999 specifically provides that "a woman may breastfeed her child at any location in a federal building or on federal property, if the woman and her child are otherwise authorized to be present at the location."
- In Davis v. Monroe County Board of Education, the Supreme Court rules that a school board can be held responsible under Title IX of the Education Amendments of 1972 for student-on-student sexual harassment.
- Northern District of Florida: Pemberton v. Tallahassee Memorial Regional Center, 66 F. Supp. 2d 1247 (N.D. Fla. 1999), is a case in the United States regarding reproductive rights. Pemberton had a previous c-section (vertical incision), and with her second child attempted to have a VBAC (vaginal birth after c-section). When a doctor she had approached about a related issue at the Tallahassee Memorial Regional Center found out, he and the hospital sued to force her to get a c-section. The court held that the rights of the fetus at or near birth outweighed the rights of Pemberton to determine her own medical care. She was physically forced to stop laboring, and taken to the hospital, where a c-section was performed. Her suit against the hospital was dismissed. The court held that a cesarean section at the end of a full-term pregnancy was here deemed to be medically necessary by doctors to avoid a substantial risk that the fetus would die during delivery due to uterine rupture, a risk of 4–6% according to the hospital's doctors and 2% according to Pemberton's doctors. Furthermore, the court held that a state's interest in preserving the life of an unborn child outweighed the mother's constitutional interest of bodily integrity. The court held that Roe v. Wade was not applicable, because bearing an unwanted child is a greater intrusion on the mother's constitutional interests than undergoing a cesarean section to deliver a child that the mother affirmatively desires to deliver. The court further distinguished In re A.C. by stating that it left open the possibility that a non-consenting patient's interest would yield to a more compelling countervailing interest in an "extremely rare and truly exceptional case." The court then held this case to be such.
- NCAA v. Smith, 525 U.S. 459 (1999), was a case in which the Supreme Court of the United States ruled that the NCAA's receipt of dues payments from colleges and universities which received federal funds was not sufficient to subject the NCAA to a lawsuit under Title IX.

== 21st century ==
=== 2000-2029 ===
2000

- Stenberg v. Carhart is a case heard by the Supreme Court of the United States dealing with a Nebraska law that made performing "partial-birth abortion" illegal, without regard for the health of the mother. Nebraska physicians who performed the procedure were subject to having their medical licenses revoked. The court struck down the law, finding the Nebraska statute criminalizing "partial birth abortion[s]" violated the Due Process Clause of the United States Constitution, as interpreted in Planned Parenthood v. Casey and Roe v. Wade.
- United States v. Morrison is a Supreme Court decision which held that parts of the Violence Against Women Act of 1994 were unconstitutional because they exceeded congressional power under the Commerce Clause and under section 5 of the Fourteenth Amendment to the Constitution.
- The EEOC rules that companies that provided insurance for prescription drugs to their employees but excluded birth control were violating the Civil Rights Act of 1964.

2001

- The Mexico City policy is reinstated by President George W. Bush, who implemented it through conditions in USAID grant awards, and subsequently extended the policy to "voluntary population planning" assistance provided by the Department of State.
- Ferguson v. City of Charleston is a Supreme Court decision that found Medical University of South Carolina's policy regarding involuntary drug testing of pregnant women to violate the Fourth Amendment. The court stated that the search in question was unreasonable.
- Nguyen v. INS is a Supreme Court case in which the court upheld the validity of laws relating to U.S. citizenship at birth for children born outside the United States, out of wedlock, or to an American parent. The court declined to overturn a more restrictive citizenship requirement applying to a foreign-born child of an American father and a non-American mother who was not married to the father, as opposed to a child born to an American mother under similar circumstances.

2002

- Center for Reproductive Law and Policy v. Bush is a case in which the United States Court of Appeals for the Second Circuit upheld the Bush administration's re-imposition of the Mexico City policy, which states that "the United States will no longer contribute to separate nongovernmental organizations which perform or actively promote abortion as a method of family planning in other nations".
- In Apessos v. Memorial Press Group, a Massachusetts state court makes a ruling forbidding employers from firing domestic violence survivors who need to take time off from work to obtain a court order of protection.
- California: State legislature passes a law that says: "The state may not deny or interfere with a woman's right to choose or obtain an abortion prior to viability of the fetus, or when the abortion is necessary to protect the life or health of the woman."

Florida: In 2002, Sultaana Freeman filed a religious discrimination lawsuit against Florida when the state's Department of Highway Safety suspended her license when she refused to be re-photographed without her veil. Her legal license was suspended without change in policy or law following the September 11, 2001 attacks. Her lawsuit argued that her religious beliefs required her to wear a veil "in front of strangers and unrelated males". It also stated that other states allowed photo-free licenses for religious reasons. Judge Janet C. Thorpe denied her lawsuit that year, and a state appeals court later upheld Thorpe's ruling.

2003

- In June, the New Hampshire Parental Notification Prior to Abortion Act, "an act requiring parental notification before abortions may be performed on unemancipated minors," is narrowly passed by the New Hampshire General Court. It was repealed in 2007.
- Scheidler v. National Organization for Women is a Supreme Court case determining whether abortion providers could receive damages from protesters under the Racketeer Influenced and Corrupt Organizations Act. National Organization for Women (NOW) obtained class status for women seeking the use of women's health clinics and began its court battle against Joseph Scheidler and PLAN et al. in 1986. In this particular case, the court's opinion was that extortion did not apply to the defendants' actions because they did not obtain any property from the respondents (NOW and the class of women).
- The Partial-Birth Abortion Ban Act is a United States law prohibiting a form of late-term abortion that it calls "partial-birth abortion", referred to in medical literature as intact dilation and extraction.
- Nevada Department of Human Resources v. Hibbs is a Supreme Court case which determined that the Family and Medical Leave Act of 1993 was "narrowly targeted" at "sex-based overgeneralization" and was thus a "valid exercise of [congressional] power under Section 5 of the Fourteenth Amendment."
- The Indiana Supreme Court recognizes the medical malpractice tort of "wrongful pregnancy" when a woman became pregnant after a failed sterilization procedure. The court decided that the damages may include the cost of the pregnancy but may not include the ordinary cost of raising the child, as the benefits of rearing the child could not be calculated.

2005

- Jackson v. Birmingham Board of Education is a case in which the Supreme Court held that retaliation against a person because that person has complained of sex discrimination is a form of intentional sex discrimination encompassed by Title IX.
- McCorvey v. Hill is a case in which the principal original litigant in Roe v. Wade, Norma McCorvey, requested the overturning of Roe. The U.S. Court of Appeals for the Fifth Circuit ruled that McCorvey could not do this; the United States Supreme Court denied certiorari on February 22, rendering the opinion of the Fifth Circuit final.
- Eduardo Gonzalez, et al. v. Abercrombie & Fitch Stores, Inc., et al., filed in June, alleges that Abercrombie & Fitch "violated Title VII of the Civil Rights Act of 1964 by maintaining recruiting and hiring practice that excluded minorities and women and adopting a restrictive marketing image, and other policies, which limited minority and female employment". The female and Latino, African American, and Asian American plaintiffs charged that they were either not hired despite strong qualifications or if hired "they were steered not to sales positions out front, but to low-visibility, back-of-the-store jobs, stocking and cleaning up". In April 2005, the U.S. District Court approved a settlement, valued at approximately $50 million, which required Abercrombie & Fitch to provide monetary benefits to the class of Latino, African American, Asian American and female applicants and employees who charged the company with discrimination. The settlement, rendered as a Consent Decree, also required the company to institute a range of policies and programs to promote diversity among its workforce and to prevent discrimination based on race or gender. Implementation of the Consent Decree continued into 2011. Abercrombie did not admit liability.
- Castle Rock v. Gonzales, 545 U.S. 748 (2005), was a United States Supreme Court case in which the Court ruled, 7–2, that a town and its police department could not be sued under 42 U.S.C. §1983 for failing to enforce a restraining order, which had led to the murder of a woman's three children by her estranged husband.
- The New York City Council passes a law requiring all new establishments falling under the terms of the legislation to maintain roughly a two-to-one ratio of women's bathroom stalls to men's stalls and urinals. Existing establishments were required to come into compliance when they undergo extensive renovations, while restaurants, schools, hospitals, and municipal buildings were excluded.
- The U.S. Deficit Reduction Act of 2005 (implemented in January 2007) prevented college health centers and many health care providers from participating in the drug pricing discount program, which formerly allowed contraceptives to be sold to students and women of low income in the United States at low cost.
- Tennessee law previously stated that a person could be guilty of the rape of a spouse at a time they are living together only if that person either "was armed with a weapon or any article used or fashioned in a manner to lead the alleged victim to reasonably believe it to be a weapon" or "caused serious bodily injury to the alleged victim". This meant that, in practice, most cases of marital rape could not be prosecuted, since few rapes involve such extreme circumstances. The law was repealed in 2005, allowing for marital rape to be treated like any other type of rape.
- South Dakota's legislature passes five laws curtailing the legality of abortion in 2005.

2006

- Jespersen v. Harrah's Operating Co. is a United States federal employment law sex discrimination case. Darlene Jespersen was a 20-year employee at Harrah's Casino in Reno, Nevada. In 2000, Harrah's advanced a "Personal Best" policy, which created strict standards for employee appearance and grooming, which included a requirement that women wear substantial amounts of makeup. Jespersen was fired for non-compliance with its policy, and she argued the makeup requirement was contrary to her self-image, and that the requirement violated Title VII of the Civil Rights Act of 1964. In 2001, Jespersen filed a lawsuit in United States District Court for the District of Nevada, which found against her claim. The district court opined that the policy imposed "equal burdens" on both sexes and that the policy did not discriminate based on immutable characteristics of her sex. The 9th Circuit Court of Appeals affirmed the decision, but on rehearing en banc, reversed part of its decision. The full panel concluded, in contrast to the previous rulings, that such grooming requirements could be challenged as sex stereotyping in some cases, even in view of the decision in Price Waterhouse v. Hopkins. However, the panel found that Jespersen had not provided evidence that the policy had been motivated by stereotyping, and affirmed the district court's finding for Harrah's.
- Khalid Adem, an Ethiopian American, is both the first person prosecuted and first person convicted for female genital mutilation in the United States, stemming from charges that he had personally excised his two-year-old daughter's clitoris with a pair of scissors.
- On November 24, Title IX regulations are amended to provide greater flexibility in the operation of single-sex classes or extracurricular activities at the primary or secondary school level.
- Ayotte v. Planned Parenthood of Northern New England is a case presided over by the Supreme Court involving a facial challenge to New Hampshire's parental notification abortion law. The First Circuit had ruled that the law was unconstitutional and an injunction against its enforcement was proper. The Supreme Court vacated this judgment and remanded the case, but avoided a substantive ruling on the challenged law or a reconsideration of prior Supreme Court abortion precedent; it only addressed the issue of remedy, holding that invalidating a statute in its entirety "is not always necessary or justified, for lower courts may be able to render narrower declaratory and injunctive relief."
- Governor Kathleen Blanco of Louisiana signs into law a ban on most forms of abortion (unless the life of the mother was in danger or her health would be permanently damaged) once it passed the state legislature. The bill only went into effect if the United States Supreme Court reversed Roe v. Wade, and would allow the prosecution of any person who performed or aided in an abortion. The penalties include up to 10 years in prison and a maximum fine of $100,000.
- In Burlington Northern & Santa Fe Railway Co. v. White, the standard for retaliation against a sexual harassment complainant is revised to include any adverse employment decision or treatment that would be likely to dissuade a "reasonable worker" from making or supporting a charge of discrimination.
- The Michigan Civil Rights Initiative, or Proposal 2 (Michigan 06–2), was a ballot initiative that passed into Michigan constitutional law. It was a citizen initiative aimed at stopping discrimination based on race, color, sex, or religion in admission to colleges, jobs, and other publicly funded institutions – effectively prohibiting affirmative action by public institutions based on those factors. Its constitutionality was challenged in federal court, but its constitutionality was ultimately upheld by the Supreme Court.

2007

- The New Hampshire Parental Notification Prior to Abortion Act is repealed.
- Massachusetts passes a law that established a 35-foot buffer zone around abortion clinics. It was struck down in 2014.
- Gonzales v. Carhart is a Supreme Court case that upheld the Partial-Birth Abortion Ban Act of 2003.
- Ledbetter v. Goodyear Tire & Rubber Co. is an employment discrimination decision of the Supreme Court, stating that employers cannot be sued under Title VII of the Civil Rights Act of 1964 over race or gender pay discrimination if the claims are based on decisions made by the employer 180 days ago or more. Justice Samuel Alito determined for the five-justice majority that each paycheck received did not constitute a discrete discriminatory act, even if affected by a prior decision outside the time limit. Ledbetter's claim of the "paycheck accrual rule" was rejected.
- Michael Buday and Diana Bijon enlisted the American Civil Liberties Union (ACLU) and filed a discrimination lawsuit against the state of California. According to the ACLU, the obstacles facing a husband who wishes to adopt his wife's last name violated the equal protection clause provided by the 14th Amendment of the Constitution. At the time of the lawsuit, only the states of Georgia, Hawaii, Iowa, Massachusetts, New York and North Dakota explicitly allowed a man to change his name through marriage with the same ease as a woman. As a result of the lawsuit, the Name Equality Act of 2007 was passed to allow either spouse to change their name, using their marriage license as the means of the change; the law took effect in 2009.

2008

- Nebraska: "(1) The state shall not discriminate against, or grant preferential treatment to, any individual or group on the basis of race, sex, color, ethnicity, or national origin in the operation of public employment, public education, or public contracting.[....] (3) Nothing in this section prohibits bona fide qualifications based on sex that are reasonably necessary to the normal operation of public employment, public education, or public contracting."
- Maouloud Baby v. State of Maryland is a Maryland state court case relating to the ability to withdraw sexual consent. The jury in the trial court convicted Baby of first degree rape and related charges, but the Court of Special Appeals, based upon a 1980 precedent that held that a rape could not legally occur if a woman withdrew consent after penetration, reversed the conviction. That precedent interpreted the English common law such that the withdrawal of consent following initial penetration did not make the act a rape. The court noted other states had noted that the act of intercourse is not completed at the initial penetration, and so consent could be withdrawn at any point during intercourse. For rape, the court noted that force or threat of force was a necessary element of the crime. Due to issues involving the instructions to the jury regarding rape and consent, the case was remanded for a new trial. In 2008, the Court of Appeals affirmed the Court of Special Appeals' reversal of the convictions and remand for re-trial, due to the trial court's error in failing to answer the jury's questions about whether a sex act continued after the withdrawal of consent could constitute rape if penetration had already occurred. However, the court ruled that consent could be withdrawn at any time, even if the victim had initially consented.
- The Federal Bureau of Prisons mandates that in all federal correctional facilities, "inmates in labor, delivery, or post-delivery recuperations shall not be placed in restraints unless there are reasonable grounds to believe the inmate presents an immediate serious threat of hurting herself or others, or there are reasonable grounds to believe the inmate presents an immediate and credible risk of escape."
- In April, Bush signs the Second Chance Act into law, requiring all federal facilities to document and report "the use of physical restraints on pregnant female prisoners during pregnancy, labor, delivery, and post-delivery and justify the use of restraints with documented security concerns".

2009

- The Lilly Ledbetter Fair Pay Act of 2009 is a federal statute in the United States that was the first bill signed into law by President Barack Obama on January 29. It amends the Civil Rights Act of 1964.
- The Mexico City policy was rescinded January 23.
- Crawford v. Metropolitan Government of Nashville, 555 U.S. 271 (2009), is a United States Supreme Court case in which the Court unanimously ruled that Title VII of the 1964 Civil Rights Act protects an employee who opposes unlawful sexual harassment, but does not report the harassment herself or himself.
- The Matthew Shepard and James Byrd Jr. Hate Crimes Prevention Act is an American Act of Congress, passed on October 22, 2009, and signed into law by President Barack Obama on October 28, 2009, as a rider to the National Defense Authorization Act for 2010 (H.R. 2647). Conceived as a response to the murders of Matthew Shepard and James Byrd Jr., the measure expands the 1969 United States federal hate-crime law to include crimes motivated by a victim's actual or perceived gender, sexual orientation, gender identity, or disability. The bill also removes the prerequisite that the victim be engaging in a federally protected activity, like voting or going to school; gives federal authorities greater ability to engage in hate crimes investigations that local authorities choose not to pursue; provided $5 million per year in funding for fiscal years 2010 through 2012 to help state and local agencies pay for investigating and prosecuting hate crimes; and requires the Federal Bureau of Investigation (FBI) to track statistics on hate crimes based on gender and gender identity (statistics for the other groups were already tracked).
- Section 3A1.1 of the 2009 United States Sentencing Guidelines states that: "If the finder of fact at trial or, in the case of a plea of guilty or nolo contendere, the court at sentencing determines beyond a reasonable doubt that the defendant intentionally selected any victim or any property as the object of the offense of conviction because of the actual or perceived race, color, religion, national origin, ethnicity, gender, disability, or sexual orientation of any person," the sentencing court is required to increase the standard sentencing range.

2010

- Burton v. Florida, 49 So.3d 263 (2010), was a Florida District Court of Appeals case ruling that the court cannot impose unwanted treatment on a pregnant woman "in the best interests of the fetus" without providing evidence of fetal viability.
- Nebraska becomes the first state to use the disputed notion of fetal pain as a rationale to ban abortion after 20 weeks.
- In Reeves v. C.H. Robinson Worldwide, Inc. the United States Court of Appeals for the Eleventh Circuit rules that a hostile work environment can be created in a workplace where sexually explicit language and pornography are present. A hostile workplace may exist even if it is not targeted at any particular employee.
- Section 4207 of the Patient Protection and Affordable Care Act amends the Fair Labor Standards Act and required employers to provide a reasonable break time for an employee to breastfeed her child if the child is less than one year old. The employee must be allowed to breastfeed in a private place, other than a bathroom. The employer is not required to pay the employee during the break time. Employers with fewer than 50 employees are not required to comply with the law if doing so would impose an undue hardship to the employer based on its size, finances, nature, or structure of its business.
- Sex discrimination is outlawed in health insurance.
- Oklahoma: Sex-selective abortions were banned in Oklahoma.
- In United States v. Jardee it was ruled that the threat of being subjected to the Domestic Violence Offender Gun Ban did not turn an otherwise "petty" crime into a "serious" one requiring a jury trial.
- Executive Order 13535 is an executive order announced by Obama on March 21 and signed on March 24. It reinforces a commitment to preservation of the Hyde Amendment's policy restricting federal funds for abortion within the context of recent health care legislation. The order was signed after an agreement with anti-abortion Democratic Congressman Bart Stupak, who had said he and several other anti-abortion Democrats in the House of Representatives would not support the Patient Protection and Affordable Care Act unless the bill's language prohibiting federal funding of abortions was strengthened.

2011

- Wal-Mart v. Dukes is a Supreme Court case, in which the court, by a 5–4 decision, reversed the district court's decision to certify a class action lawsuit where the plaintiff class included 1.6 million women who currently work or have worked for Wal-Mart stores, including the lead plaintiff, Betty Dukes. Dukes, a current Wal-Mart employee, and others alleged gender discrimination in pay and promotion policies and practices in Wal-Mart stores.
- A New Hampshire parental notification law about abortion is passed again after the Republican-controlled House and Senate overrode Democratic governor John Lynch's veto.

2012

- In Coleman v. Maryland Court of Appeals, the Supreme Court ruled that the Family Medical Leave Act's self-care leave provision is not enforceable against states; the court did not agree that the provision addresses sex discrimination and sex stereotyping.
- Oklahoma: A fetal heartbeat bill (SB 1274) is signed into law by then-Oklahoma governor Mary Fallin that required an abortion provider to offer a woman the opportunity to hear the conceptus's heartbeat before ending the pregnancy, and applied when the conceptus was at least eight weeks old. The bill took effect later in the year.
- New Hampshire passes a law that requires minors to wait 48 hours after requesting an abortion but no longer required parental consent.
- Mississippi state legislature passed a law that required abortion clinics to have doctors on staff with hospital admitting privileges.
- Arizona Governor Jan Brewer signed into law in April abortion restrictions that prohibited the procedure after 20 weeks. The U.S. Ninth Circuit Court of Appeals overturned this law in January 2015.
- In Planned Parenthood v. Rounds, the United States Court of Appeals for the Eighth Circuit ruled that a South Dakota law requiring doctors to give patients information about the potential suicide risk in women who have abortions was not unconstitutional.
- An item in the Provisions of the Patient Protection and Affordable Care Act, effective August 1, states that all new health insurance plans must cover certain preventive services such as mammograms and colonoscopies without charging a deductible, co-pay or coinsurance. Women's preventive services – including well-woman visits; gestational diabetes screening; human papillomavirus DNA testing for women age 30 and older; sexually transmitted infection counseling; human immunodeficiency virus screening and counseling; FDA-approved contraceptive methods and contraceptive counseling; breastfeeding support, supplies and counseling; and domestic violence screening and counseling – will be covered without cost sharing. The requirement to cover FDA-approved contraceptive methods is also known as the contraceptive mandate.

2013

- University of Texas Southwestern Medical Center v. Nassar, 570 U.S. ___ (2013), was a Supreme Court of the United States case involving the standard of proof required for a retaliation claim under Title VII. The Court held that while Title VII applies a mixed motive discrimination framework to claims of discrimination on the basis of race, color, religion, sex, or national origin (see 42 U.S.C. § 2000e-2), that framework did not apply to claims of retaliation under 42 U.S.C. § 2000e-3. The Court reasoned that based on its decision in Gross v. FBL Financial Services, Inc. and on common law principles of tort law, the plaintiff was required to show that a retaliatory motive was the "but for" cause of the adverse employment action.
- Ohio passes a Targeted Regulation of Abortion Providers bill containing provisions related to admitting privileges and licensing and requiring clinics to have a transfer agreement with a hospital.
- A law is signed in Ohio by Governor John Kasich, which mandates, among other things, that doctors who do not test for a fetal heartbeat when a patient seeks an abortion, tell the patient in writing if there is a heartbeat, and then tell them the statistical likelihood that the fetus could be carried to term, are subject to criminal penalties: "The doctor's failure to do so would be a first-degree misdemeanor, carrying up to six months in jail, for the first violation and a fourth-degree felony, carrying up to 18 months in jail, for subsequent violations."
- A bill banning abortion after twelve weeks is passed on January 31 by the Arkansas Senate, but vetoed in Arkansas by Governor Mike Beebe. On March 6, his veto was overridden by the Arkansas House of Representatives. A federal judge issued a temporary injunction against the Arkansas law in May, and in March 2014, it was struck down by federal judge Susan Webber Wright, who described the law as unconstitutional.
- The Transport for Female Genital Mutilation Act, which prohibits knowingly transporting a girl out of the United States for the purpose of undergoing FGM, is enacted.
- On March 7, Obama signs the Violence Against Women Reauthorization Act of 2013. The renewed act expanded federal protections to gays, lesbians and transgender individuals, Native Americans and immigrants.
- Kansas lawmakers approve sweeping anti-abortion legislation on April 6 that says life begins at fertilization, forbids abortion based on gender, and bans Planned Parenthood from providing sex education in schools.
- Washington renounces the exemption preventing a spouse from being prosecuted with third-degree-rape against the other spouse.
- Vance v. Ball State University is a U.S. Supreme Court case regarding who is a "supervisor" for the purposes of harassment lawsuits. The Supreme Court upheld the Seventh Circuit's decision in a 5–4 opinion written by Samuel Alito, rejecting the Equal Employment Opportunity Commission's interpretation of who counts as a supervisor. The case was important because it resolved a dispute between several different circuits. The Supreme Court held that an employee is a "supervisor" for purposes of vicarious liability under Title VII only if he or she is empowered by the employer to take tangible employment actions against the victim.
- Florida: A Florida man successfully forced the Florida Department of Motor Vehicles to accept his decision to take his wife's last name.

2014

- United States v. Castleman (2014) challenged the application of the Domestic Violence Offender Gun Ban to misdemeanor convictions which did not involve "the use or attempted use of physical force". In a 9–0 decision, the United States Supreme Court held that Castleman's conviction of "misdemeanor domestic assault" did qualify as a "misdemeanor crime of domestic violence" under Tennessee state law. Specifically they held that the ""physical force" requirement is satisfied by the degree of force that supports a common-law battery conviction – namely, offensive touching" – thereby preventing him from possession of firearms.
- Arkansas: A bill banning abortion after twelve weeks is passed on January 31, 2013, by the state senate, but vetoed in Arkansas by Beebe. On March 6 of the same year, his veto was overridden by the Arkansas House of Representatives. A federal judge issued a temporary injunction against the Arkansas law in May 2013, and in March 2014, it was struck down by Wright, who described the law as unconstitutional.
- The Board of Immigration Appeals, America's highest immigration court, found for the first time that women who were victims of severe domestic violence in their home countries could be eligible for asylum in the United States. As the ruling was in the case of a woman from Guatemala, it only applies to women from that country.
- New amendments were made to the Clery Act to require reporting on domestic violence, dating violence and stalking.
- Burwell v. Hobby Lobby is a landmark decision by the Supreme Court allowing closely held for-profit corporations to be exempt from a law its owners religiously object to if there is a less restrictive means of furthering the law's interest. It is the first time that the court has recognized a for-profit corporation's claim of religious belief, but it is limited to closely held corporations. (Note: "Closely held" corporations are defined by the Internal Revenue Service as those which a) have more than 50% of the value of their outstanding stock owned (directly or indirectly) by 5 or fewer individuals at any time during the last half of the tax year; and b) are not personal service corporations. By this definition, approximately 90% of U.S. corporations are "closely held", and approximately 52% of the U.S. workforce is employed by "closely held" corporations. See Blake 2014, Washington Post.) The decision is an interpretation of the Religious Freedom Restoration Act and does not address whether such corporations are protected by the free-exercise of religion clause of the First Amendment of the Constitution. For such companies, the court's majority decision directly struck down the contraceptive mandate, a regulation adopted by the US Department of Health and Human Services (HHS) under the Affordable Care Act requiring employers to cover certain contraceptives for their female employees, by a 5–4 vote. The court said that the mandate was not the least restrictive way to ensure access to contraceptive care, noting that a less restrictive alternative was being provided for religious non-profits, until the court issued an injunction three days later, effectively ending said alternative, replacing it with a government-sponsored alternative for any female employees of closely held corporations that do not wish to provide birth control.
- McCullen v. Coakley is a case looked over by the Supreme Court, where it unanimously held that Massachusetts' 35-feet fixed abortion buffer zones, established via amendments to that state's Reproductive Health Care Facilities Act, violated the First Amendment to the U.S. Constitution because it limited free speech too broadly.
- Oregon: "Equality of rights under the law shall not be denied or abridged by the state of Oregon or by any political subdivision in this state on account of sex."
- Louisiana passes a law that appeared to require the state to maintain a database of women who had abortions in the state and the type of abortion received.
- Louisiana: Act 620, modeled after one passed earlier in Texas, required that any doctor performing abortions also have admittance privileges at an authorized hospital within a 30-mile radius of the abortion clinic, among other new requirements. At the time the law was passed, only one doctor had these privileges, effectively leaving only one legal abortion clinic in the state.

2015

- Arizona: Brewer signed into law in April 2012 abortion restrictions that prohibited the procedure after 20 weeks. The U.S. Ninth Circuit Court of Appeals overturned this law in January 2015.
- Tennessee establishes a required 48-hour waiting period before obtaining an abortion.
- Kansas becomes the first state in the United States to ban the dilation and evacuation procedure. The law was later struck down by the Kansas Court of Appeals in January 2016 without ever having gone into effect.
- The Obama administration issues a new rule stating that a closely held for-profit company that objects to covering contraception in its health plan can write a letter to the Department of Health and Human Services stating its objection, and that the department will then notify a third-party insurer of the company's objection, who will provide birth control coverage to the company's female employees at no additional cost to the company.
- A policy update requires all Indian Health Service-run pharmacies, clinics, and emergency departments to have Plan B One-Step in stock to distribute it to any woman (or her representative) who asked for it without a prescription, age verification, registration or any other requirement, to provide orientation training to all staff regarding the medication, to provide unbiased and medically accurate information about emergency contraception, and to make someone available at all times to distribute the pill in case the primary staffer objected to providing it on religious or moral grounds.
- Pao v. Kleiner Perkins is a lawsuit filed in 2012 in San Francisco County Superior Court under the law of California by executive Ellen Pao for gender discrimination against her employer, Kleiner Perkins Caufield & Byers. Overlapping with a number of studies on the representation of women in venture capital, the case was followed closely by reporters, advocacy groups and Silicon Valley executives. Given the tendency for similar cases to reach settlements out of court, coverage of Pao v. Kleiner Perkins described it as a landmark trial once it began in February. On March 27, the jury found in favor of Kleiner Perkins on all counts.
- In the Supreme Court case Texas Dept. of Housing and Community Affairs v. Inclusive Communities Project, Inc., the court determines that Congress specifically intended to include disparate impact claims in the Fair Housing Act, but that such claims require a plaintiff to prove it is the defendant's policies that cause a disparity. The Fair Housing Act prohibits discrimination based on sex.
- Young v. United Parcel Service is a Supreme Court case, in which the court evaluated the requirements for bringing a disparate treatment claim under the Pregnancy Discrimination Act. In a 6–3 decision, the court determined that to bring such a claim, a pregnant employee must show that their employer refused to provide accommodations and that the employer later provided accommodations to other employees with similar restrictions.
- California: Based on a report prepared by NARAL Pro-Choice America, which alleged that Crisis Pregnancy Centers (CPCs) were providing misleading and inaccurate information, state legislature passes the Reproductive FACT (Freedom, Accountability, Comprehensive Care, and Transparency) Act in October. It required any licensed healthcare facility that provided care services related to pregnancies to post a notice that stated "California has public programs that provide immediate free or low-cost access to comprehensive family planning services (including all FDA-approved methods of contraception), prenatal care, and abortion for eligible women." The law set provisions where this notice was to be posted and established civil fines if facilities did not comply. The act also required unlicensed facilities which offered certain pregnancy-related services to post a notice stating: "This facility is not licensed as a medical facility by the State of California and has no licensed medical provider who provides or directly supervises the provision of all of the services, whose primary purpose is providing pregnancy-related services."

2016

- The FACT Act of New York state made patients aware of state-sponsored services that are available at crisis pregnancy centers. The law goes into effect January 1.
- Zubik v. Burwell is a case seen before the Supreme Court on whether religious institutions other than churches should be exempt from the contraceptive mandate, a regulation adopted by the HHS under the Affordable Care Act that requires non-church employers to cover certain contraceptives for their female employees, even though churches are already exempt under those regulations. On May 16, the Supreme Court issued a per curiam decision ruling in Zubik v. Burwell that vacated the decisions of the Circuit Courts of Appeals and remanded the case "to the respective United States Courts of Appeals for the Third, Fifth, Tenth, and D.C. Circuits" for reconsideration in light of the "positions asserted by the parties in their supplemental briefs". Because the petitioners agreed that "their religious exercise is not infringed where they 'need to do nothing more than contract for a plan that does not include coverage for some or all forms of contraception'", the court held that the parties should be given an opportunity to clarify and refine how this approach would work in practice and to "resolve any outstanding issues". The Supreme Court expressed "no view on the merits of the cases". In a concurring opinion, Justices Sotomeyer and Ginsburg noted that in earlier cases "some lower courts have ignored those instructions" and cautioned lower courts not to read any signals in the Supreme Court's actions in this case.
- Voisine v. United States is a Supreme Court case in which it determined that reckless misdemeanor domestic violence convictions trigger gun control prohibitions on gun ownership.
- Whole Woman's Health v. Hellerstedt is a Supreme Court case decided on June 27 when it ruled 5–3 that Texas cannot place restrictions on the delivery of abortion services that create an undue burden for women seeking an abortion. It has been called the most significant abortion rights case before the Supreme Court since Planned Parenthood v. Casey in 1992.
- The Survivors' Bill of Rights Act of 2016 is passed by the United States Congress in September and signed into law by Obama on October 7. The law overhauls the way that rape kits are processed within the United States and creates a bill of rights for victims. Through the law, survivors of sexual assault are given the right to have a rape kit preserved for the length of the case's statute of limitations, to be notified of an evidence kit's destruction, and to be informed about results of forensic exams.
- The Obama administration issues guidance that informed states that ending Medicaid funding for Planned Parenthood or other health-care providers that performed abortions might be against federal law. The Obama administration contended that Medicaid law permitted states to ban providers from the program only if the providers could not perform covered services or bill for those services. However, the Trump administration repealed this guidance in 2018.
- A 2016 Alabama law bans dilation and evacuation. In August 2018, the Eleventh Circuit ruled the D&E legislation to be unconstitutional, preventing it from being enforced.
- South Carolina governor Nikki Haley signs legislation that brought into effect a 20-week abortion ban in 2016.

2017

- California: In 2011, the trustees of Deep Springs College voted to begin accepting female students in the summer of 2013 but became embroiled in legal challenges which were lodged against the trustees' action. The challengers disputed the authority of the college's board to change the admissions policy and included an injunction preventing the college from accepting female students until at least the 2018–2019 academic year. On April 13, 2017, the California Court of Appeal ruled that the college could admit women in Hitz v. Hoekstra.
- A law passed by the Wyoming state legislature goes into effect that prohibits the sale of fetal tissue. Another law went into effect in the state that required abortion service providers to give women seeking abortions an ultrasound, but had no enforcement component.
- The 100th Illinois General Assembly repealed the trigger law component of the Illinois Abortion Law of 1975, but left many of its other provisions intact. In the same act, the General Assembly provided for abortion to be covered under Medicaid and state employee health insurance. The bill was signed into law by pro-choice Republican governor Bruce Rauner.
- The Mexico City policy is reinstated by President Donald Trump, who also expands it to cover all global health organizations that receive U.S. government funding, rather than only family planning organizations that do, as was previously the case.
- A new law ends Obama's executive order, which would have mandated companies trying to get contracts with the federal government to show compliance with federal anti-discrimination laws. That executive order had been enjoined by a federal judge in October 2016.
- A rule about abortions is overturned by new legislation. In late 2016, the Obama administration issued the rule, effective in January 2017, banning U.S. states from withholding federal family-planning funds from health clinics that give abortions, including Planned Parenthood affiliates; this rule mandates that local and state governments give federal funds for services related to sexually transmitted infections, pregnancy care, fertility, contraception, and breast and cervical cancer screening to qualified health providers whether or not they give abortions. The rule was blocked by a federal judge the day before it would have taken effect.
- The Ninth U.S. Circuit Court of Appeals rules that employers could pay women less than men for the same work if they based that on differences in the workers' previous salaries.
- The Trump administration issues a ruling letting insurers and employers refuse to provide birth control if doing so went against their "religious beliefs" or "moral convictions".
- Federal judge Wendy Beetlestone issues an injunction temporarily stopping the enforcement of the Trump administration ruling letting insurers and employers refuse to provide birth control if doing so went against their "religious beliefs" or "moral convictions".
- Delaware's state legislature updates its legal code on abortion to read: "The termination of a pregnancy prior to viability, to protect the life or health of the mother, or in the event of serious fetal anomaly."
- The Reproductive Health Equity Act is passed, which required health insurance in Oregon to offer abortion coverage and to absorb most of the costs for the procedure.

2018

- The Trump administration repeals guidance issued in 2016 by the Obama administration, which had informed states that ending Medicaid funding for Planned Parenthood or other health-care providers that performed abortions might be against federal law. The Obama administration had contended that Medicaid law permitted states to ban providers from the program only if the providers could not perform covered services or bill for those services.
- National Institute of Family and Life Advocates v. Becerra is a case before the Supreme Court addressing the constitutionality of California's FACT Act, which mandated that crisis pregnancy centers provide certain disclosures about state services. The centers, typically run by Christian non-profit groups, challenged the act on the basis that it violated their free speech. After prior reviews in lower courts, the case was brought to the Supreme Court, asking "Whether the disclosures required by the California Reproductive FACT Act violate the protections set forth in the free speech clause of the First Amendment, applicable to the states through the 14th Amendment." The Court ruled on June 26 in a 5–4 decision that the notices required by the FACT Act violate the First Amendment by targeting speakers rather than speech.
- A law is signed making California the first state in America to require women to be included on companies’ boards of directors, and requires all publicly traded California companies to have at least one woman on their boards by the end of 2019, and in 2021 requires five-member boards to have two female members, and boards with six or more members to have three.
- The Stop Enabling Sex Traffickers Act (SESTA) and Allow States and Victims to Fight Online Sex Trafficking Act (FOSTA) are the U.S. Senate and House bills that as the FOSTA-SESTA package became law on April 11. They clarify the country's sex trafficking law to make it illegal to knowingly assist, facilitate, or support sex trafficking, and amend the Section 230 safe harbors of the Communications Decency Act (which make online services immune from civil liability for the actions of their users) to exclude enforcement of federal or state sex trafficking laws from its immunity.
- On November 20, Judge Bernard A. Friedman ruled that the federal Female Genital Mutilation Act of 1996 was unconstitutional. The defendants in this case which led to this ruling had argued successfully that the practice does not pertain to the Commerce Clause under which the federal law was passed.
- The First Step Act becomes law, requiring the Federal Bureau of Prisons to make feminine hygiene products "available to prisoners for free, in a quantity that is appropriate to the healthcare needs of each prisoner". It also prohibits the use of restraints on pregnant women unless the woman "is an immediate and credible flight risk that cannot reasonably be prevented by other means" or "poses an immediate and serious threat of harm to herself or others that cannot reasonably be prevented by other means" or "a healthcare professional responsible for the health and safety of the prisoner determines that the use of restraints is appropriate for the medical safety of the prisoner." For those situations in which restraints are allowed, the legislation mandates the use of the least restrictive restraints necessary, but only applies to federal prisons.
- Indiana: "The General Assembly shall not grant to any citizen, or class of citizens, privileges or immunities, which, upon the same terms, shall not equally belong to all citizens."
- Mississippi: District Judge Carlton Reeves blocked a law banning abortion at 15 weeks from taking effect.
- The Violence Against Women Act expires on December 21.
- In April and June, Ketanji Brown Jackson of the United States District Court for the District of Columbia presides over two cases challenging the Department of Health and Human Services' decision to terminate grants for teen pregnancy prevention programs two years early. Jackson ruled that the decision to terminate the grants early, without any explanation for doing so, was arbitrary and capricious.
- A 2016 Alabama law that banned dilation and evacuation is overturned in August 2018 by the Eleventh Circuit.
- Arizona state legislature passes a law that requires the Arizona Health Department to apply for Title X funds as part of their attempts to defund Planned Parenthood.
- Iowa: On May 4, Governor Kim Reynolds signs into law a bill that banned abortion in Iowa after a fetal heartbeat is detected, starting July 1. On January 22, 2019, a county district judge declared the law to be in violation of Iowa's State Constitution and entered a permanent injunction prohibiting its enforcement.

2019

- Arizona: On January 1, a new law came into effect that required women to provide detailed medical information that was to be submitted to the state before they were allowed to have an abortion. Among the information the new law required abortion providers to collect was whether the abortion was elective or therapeutic, the number of abortions they have had in the past and information on any medical complications they have as a result of the abortion. This information is then collected by Department of Health Services who provide the state with an annual report on abortions in the state, along with information on the how abortions are paid for in the state.
- Iowa: On January 22, a county district judge declares the law Reynolds signed on May 4, 2018, to be in violation of Iowa's State Constitution and entered a permanent injunction prohibiting its enforcement.
- The Violence Against Women Act, which expired on December 21, 2018, was temporarily reinstated via a short-term spending bill on January 25, 2019, but expired again on February 15, 2019.
- National Coalition for Men v. Selective Service System is a court case decided on February 22 that declared that the exclusion of female conscription from the male-only draft in the United States was unconstitutional. The case did not specify any action that the government must take.
- Minnesota: Until July 2019, sexual violence occurring between spouses at the time they cohabit or between unmarried partners could be prosecuted only if there was force or threat of thereof, due to exemptions created by Article 609.349, which stipulated that certain sexual offenses do not apply to spouses (unless they are separated), and neither do they apply to unmarried cohabitants. These are offenses that deal with situations where the lack of consent is due to the incapacity of consent of the victim, including where the victim was drugged by the perpetrator. In July these exemptions were repealed.
- The Trust Nevada Women Act, SB 179, is signed into law by Democratic governor Steve Sisolak. The new law made several changes to existing abortion laws in the state of Nevada, including the decriminalization of abortion procedures and the removal of informed consent laws that said doctors needed to tell women of the "emotional implications" in having an abortion and what women should do after the procedure to avoid post-op complications; the latter was changed to require doctors to "describe the nature and consequences of the procedure" of abortion to women getting abortions. The law also meant doctors no longer had to collect data about women getting abortions related to their marital status and age.
- Box v. Planned Parenthood of Indiana and Kentucky, Inc. is a Supreme Court case dealing with the constitutionality of a 2016 anti-abortion law passed in the state of Indiana. Indiana's law sought to ban abortions performed solely on the basis of the fetus' gender, race, ethnicity, or disabilities. Lower courts had blocked enforcement of the law for violating a woman's right to abortion under privacy concerns within the Fourteenth Amendment, as previously found in Roe v. Wade and Planned Parenthood v. Casey. The lower courts also blocked enforcement of another portion of the law that required the disposal of aborted fetuses through burial or cremation. The per curiam decision by the Supreme Court overturned the injunction on the fetal disposal portion of the law, but otherwise did not challenge or confirm the lower courts' ruling on the non-discrimination clauses, leaving these in place.
- In June, the Trump administration is allowed by a federal court of appeals to implement, while legal appeals continue, a policy restricting taxpayer dollars given to family planning facilities through Title X. This policy requires that companies receiving Title X funding must not mention abortion to patients, provide abortion referrals, or share space with abortion providers.
- A federal lawsuit in the Tenth Circuit regarding Fort Collins's ordinance against female toplessness is won at the appellate level. In September, after spending over $300,000, Fort Collins decided to stop defending their ordinance against female toplessness and repeal it. That effectively gave females of all ages the right to go topless wherever males can in the jurisdiction of the Tenth Circuit (Wyoming, Utah, Colorado, New Mexico, Kansas and Oklahoma states as well as all counties and cities therein).
- Delaware: "Equality of rights under the law shall not be denied or abridged on account of sex."
- A federal judge declares the Trump administration's "conscience rule" that would have allowed providers of health care to refuse to participate in sterilizations, abortions, or other types of care they disagreed with on moral or religious grounds to be unconstitutional.
- The Fifth U.S. Circuit Court of Appeals declares that Mississippi's ban on abortion at 15 weeks was unconstitutional; the court said Reeves ruled correctly when he blocked the Mississippi law banning abortion at 15 weeks from taking effect in 2018.
- On May 20, the California State Senate passes Senate Bill 24: the College Student Right to Access Act. The Act requires public state universities to offer mifepristone, the abortion pill, to female students at zero cost by January 1, 2023; funding for the program will be paid for through insurance and private grants with $200,000 to each University of California and California State University health clinic for training and equipment. University clinics also have to set aside an additional $200,000 each to set up a student hotline to provide information to women seeking advice and assistance. The bill was approved by both the California State Assembly and California State Senate as amended on September 13, 2019, was enacted by Governor Gavin Newsom on October 11, 2019, and went into effect on January 1, 2020.
- Illinois passes bills collectively known as the Illinois Reproductive Health Act that provided statutory protections for abortions, and rescinded previous legislation that banned some late-term abortions and a 45-year-old law that had made performing such abortions a criminal offense. The Illinois Reproductive Health Act says that women have the "fundamental right" to access abortion services, and that a "fertilized egg, embryo, or fetus does not have independent rights".
- A fetal heartbeat bill is signed into law by Mississippi Governor Phil Bryant.
- Indiana legislature passes a ban of the most common type of second-trimester abortion procedure in the state in April 2019.
- In April, the Kansas Supreme Court rules that the right to abortion is inherent within the state's constitution and bill of rights, such that even if Roe v. Wade was overturned and the federal protection of abortion rights was withdrawn, the right would still be allowed within Kansas, barring a change in the state constitution.
- Before 2019, Kentucky law prohibits abortions after week 22, which changed when the state legislature passed a law that moved the prohibition to week 6 in the early part of the year.
- U.S. District Judge William Osteen formally strikes down North Carolina's "life of the mother only" 20-week abortion ban. His judgement pushed the date of which abortions could be performed to the date of viability, which is later for many women.
- New York state passes the Reproductive Health Act, which repealed a pre-Roe v. Wade provision that banned third-trimester abortions except in cases where the continuation of the pregnancy endangered a pregnant woman's life. The law said: "The legislature finds that comprehensive reproductive health care, including contraception and abortion, is a fundamental component of a woman's health, privacy, and equality." The bill also allowed qualified health practitioners to perform abortions, not just licensed medical doctors.
- The Reproductive Privacy Act bans Rhode Island from restricting “an individual person from preventing, commencing, continuing, or terminating that individual's pregnancy prior to fetal viability” or after fetal viability “to preserve the health or life” of the pregnant individual. It also forbade state restrictions on contraceptives in Rhode Island, repealed bans on partial-birth abortions in Rhode Island, forbade medical professionals from being charged with felony assault for performing abortions in Rhode Island, and repealed requirements for abortion providers to notify a husband before giving his wife an abortion in Rhode Island.
- Ohio governor Mike DeWine signs the Human Rights and Heartbeat Protection Act, which bans abortion in the state after an embryonic cardiac activity is detectable. On June 24, 2022, after the Supreme Court of the United States overturned Roe v. Wade, judge Michael R. Barrett lifted a preliminary injunction that had blocked state officials from enforcing the law against certain abortion providers, allowing the Human Rights and Heartbeat Protection Act to take full effect.
- Utah legislature passes a bill limiting abortions after 18 weeks of pregnancy.

2020

- Democratic Virginia governor Ralph Northam signs bills removing regulations that had required abortion seekers to have an ultrasound at least 24 hours before receiving an abortion and to get counseling on alternatives to abortion, removing the requirement that facilities providing more than five abortions each year be designated as hospitals, and allowing nurse practitioners to perform first trimester abortions.
- In March, Oklahoma governor Kevin Stitt signs an executive order to limit elective medical procedures, later confirming that all types of abortion services were included, except for those necessary in a medical emergency or to "prevent serious health risks" to the pregnant woman. On April 6, federal judge Charles Barnes Goodwin blocked the executive order, ruling that the state acted in an arbitrary, unreasonable, and oppressive way, which posed an undue burden on abortion access in Oklahoma.
- On March 24, Idaho governor Brad Little signs into law S1385, which is a trigger law stating that if and when states are again allowed to ban abortion on their own authority then abortion would be illegal in Idaho except for cases of the life of the mother, rape or incest.
- June Medical Services, LLC v. Russo is a Supreme Court case, in which the court ruled that a Louisiana state law placing hospital-admission requirements on abortion clinics doctors, which had mirrored a Texas state law previously found unconstitutional under Whole Woman's Health v. Hellerstedt, was also unconstitutional.
- After the passage of the ROE Act in 2020, which codified abortion rights in Massachusetts, abortions can be performed after 24 weeks in cases of fetal anomalies and risks to a patient's mental or physical health. The ROE Act also lowered the age patients can have abortions without parental consent from 18 to 16.
- A law is enacted in Mississippi banning abortions based on the sex, race, or genetic abnormality of the fetus.
- Our Lady of Guadalupe School v. Morrissey-Berru is a U.S. Supreme Court case involving the ministerial exception of federal employment discrimination laws. When applied, the exception operates to give religious institutions an affirmative defense when sued for discrimination by employees who qualify as "ministers;" for example, female priests cannot sue the Catholic church to force their hiring. The case extends from the Supreme Court's prior decision in Hosanna-Tabor Evangelical Lutheran Church & School v. Equal Employment Opportunity Commission which created the ministerial exception based on the Establishment and Free Exercise Clauses of the United States Constitution, asserting that federal discrimination laws cannot be applied to leaders of religious organizations. The case, along with the consolidated St. James School v. Biel (Docket 19-348), arose from rulings in the United States Court of Appeals for the Ninth Circuit that found that federal discrimination laws do apply to others within a religious organization that serve an important religious function but lack the title or training to be considered a religious leader under Hosanna-Tabor. The religious organization challenged that ruling on the basis of Hosanna-Tabor. The Supreme Court ruled in a 7–2 decision on July 8 that reversed the Ninth Circuit's ruling, affirming that the principles of Hosanna-Tabor, that a person can be serving an important religious function even if not holding the title or training of a religious leader, satisfied the ministerial exception in employment discrimination.
- On October 6, 2017, Health and Human Services issued a new rule with an updated religious exemption that protected religious non-profits, though Wendy Beetlestone issued an injunction temporarily stopping the enforcement of that exemption. Pennsylvania also sued the federal government to take away the exemption, and asked a judge to order that the Little Sisters of the Poor must comply with the federal mandate or pay tens of millions of dollars in fines. The state alleged that the religious organization violated the Constitution, federal anti-discrimination law, and the Administrative Procedure Act (APA). On July 8, in Little Sisters of the Poor Saints Peter and Paul Home v. Pennsylvania, the Supreme Court ruled in favor of Little Sisters of the Poor.
- National Coalition for Men v. Selective Service System was a court case decided on February 22, 2019, whose decision declared that the exclusion of female conscription from the male-only draft in the United States was unconstitutional; the decision did not specify any action that the government must take. The decision was appealed and a decision by a three-judge panel of the Fifth Circuit Court of Appeals was issued on August 13, 2020, reversing the 2019 decision on the grounds that it amounted to overturning the Supreme Court's precedent, which only the Supreme Court has the authority to do.
- Louisiana voters pass a measure to amend the state constitution to omit any language implying that a woman has a right to get an abortion or that any abortion that does occur should be funded.
- Tennessee bans abortions because of a prenatal diagnosis of Down syndrome or because of the fetus's gender or race.
- The city of East Lansing, Michigan, makes it legal for women to go topless.
- Ohio: A bill is signed into law requiring all aborted fetal tissue to be cremated or buried.
- Savanna's Act or the #MMIW Act (MMIW meaning Missing and Murdered Indigenous Women) reforms law enforcement and justice protocols appropriate to address missing and murdered Native women, and for other purposes. It was signed into law in 2020 by President Donald Trump.

2021

- South Dakota governor Kristi Noem signs an executive order requiring in-person medical visits for the prescription of medication abortions.
- In January, New Jersey governor Phil Murphy signs the Freedom of Reproductive Choice Act into law, preserving the legal right to obtain an abortion.
- Indiana: A law goes into effect in mandating an ultrasound 18 hours or more before an abortion is performed.
- The STOP FGM Act of 2020 is signed into law, giving federal authorities the power to prosecute those who carry out or conspire to carry out female genital mutilation, as well as increasing the maximum prison sentence from five to ten years. It also requires government agencies to report to Congress about the estimated number of females who are at risk of or have had FGM, and on efforts to prevent FGM.
- The Supreme Court reinstates federal rules mandating anyone having a medication abortion to acquire the pills for it from a medical provider in person.
- President Joe Biden rescinds the Mexico City policy.
- In February, South Carolina passes a law that would outlaw almost all abortions in that state after a fetal heartbeat is detected, but it was prevented from coming into effect by a judge in March 2021.
- Minnesota: The Minnesota Supreme Court rules that people who drink alcohol or take drugs of their own free will before being sexually assaulted do not meet the Minnesota legislature's definition of mentally incapacitated.
- Utah: A law goes into effect, requiring the biological father of a pregnant woman's unborn child to pay 50% of that pregnant woman's out-of-pocket pregnancy-related medical costs.
- Illinois: In autumn, the Illinois General Assembly passes a bill to repeal the Parental Notice of Abortion Act. Governor Pritzker signs it into law on December 17.
- Lebanon, Ohio, passes an ordinance whereby abortion at all stages of pregnancy was outlawed.
- Mason, Ohio, bans abortion at all stages, but this repealed later that year.
- Michigan: Legislation is signed to exempt all feminine hygiene products from state sales tax in Michigan.

2022

- On January 1, a bill passes that required patients receiving abortion care at a health center in New Hampshire to have an ultrasound.
- On March 15, Biden signs the reauthorization of the Violence Against Women Act into law as part of the Consolidated Appropriations Act of 2022, known as the Violence Against Women Act Reauthorization Act of 2022.
- In April, Colorado passes the Reproductive Health Equity Act, which guarantees access to reproductive care and affirms the rights of pregnant women to continue or terminate a pregnancy. The act prohibits public entities from restricting or denying those rights.
- On April 14, House Bill 3 is passed in Kentucky; it banned all abortions in the state after 15 weeks post-conception and introduced a number of regulations and restrictions, including a prohibition on mailing abortion pills, new systems to certify, monitor and publicly name physicians who conduct abortion procedures, "dignified care for the terminated remains of pregnancy loss", and mandatory disclosure of patient information. As the infrastructure was not in place for these new requirements, the two abortion clinics operating in Kentucky shut down, making abortion de facto illegal in the state. In response, abortion-rights activists sued the state to challenge the law, with Planned Parenthood and the ACLU stating that the law unconstitutionally bans abortion by introducing requirements that can't be followed or are too arduous to comply with and that it violates patient privacy protections. The law is blocked in federal court later in 2022.
- Oklahoma's abortion ban takes effect on May 25, when Stitt signed HB 4327 into law, and abortion providers ceased offering services in Oklahoma as of that date. HB 4327 is modeled after the Texas Heartbeat Act and is enforced solely through civil lawsuits brought by private citizens, making it difficult for abortion providers to challenge the constitutionality of the statute in court. The state became the first to ban abortion from the moment of fertilization since Roe v. Wade.
- The United States Court of Appeals for the Fourth Circuit rules against the Charter Day School in North Carolina, which required girls to wear skirts due to the idea that girls are "fragile vessels" deserving "gentle" treatment from boys. The court ruled the requirement was unconstitutional.
- A law is signed requiring the Department of Education to supply free menstrual products to all students on all public school campuses in Hawaii.
- On June 17, the Iowa Supreme Court ruled that the state constitution does not protect the right to an abortion. Justice Edward Mansfield wrote in the majority that “[a]ll we hold today is that the Iowa Constitution is not the source of a fundamental right to an abortion necessitating a strict scrutiny standard of review for regulations affecting that right”. The court's decision is a reversal of its 2018 ruling, where it found that the constitution protects the right to an abortion.
- Dobbs v. Jackson Women's Health Organization is a decision by the Supreme Court, in which it determined that the Constitution of the United States does not confer any right to abortion, overruling both Roe v. Wade and Planned Parenthood v. Casey.
- Kentucky: On June 24, the 2019 trigger law took effect after the ruling for Dobbs v. Jackson Women's Health Organization was delivered. It made all abortions illegal except when medically mandatory to prevent the patient from dying or getting a "life-sustaining organ" permanently impaired. Both clinics in the state temporarily stopped providing abortions.
- Utah: According to HB136, which is effective Utah state law from June 28, abortions are banned following 18 weeks of gestation.
- Kentucky: On June 30, Jefferson County circuit judge Mitch Perry issues a temporary restraining order blocking the enforcement of Kentucky's abortion-banning trigger law pending further hearings to determine if the ban violates the Kentucky Constitution. This order temporarily allows both of Kentucky's elective abortion providers, which are both located in Louisville, to temporarily resume elective abortions.
- President Biden signs Executive Order 14076, which directs the Department of Health and Human Services to expand access to contraceptives, requests the Federal Trade Commission protect patients' reproductive health privacy, and directs the Department of Justice to organize a group of pro bono lawyers to defend women charged with having an abortion.
- The Biden presidential administration issues guidance stating that due to federal law, pharmacies are not allowed to turn away people who have a prescription for a drug that might end a pregnancy.
- A legislative committee passes a proposed law to the House floor in Louisiana that would have potentially criminalized abortion seekers, as well as abortion providers, which was met with vehement opposition by both pro- and anti-abortion advocates and ultimately amended by the full House to remove criminal sanctions for abortion seekers, passed into law and signed by Governor John Bel Edwards.
- The Abortion Care Access Act is enacted in Maryland; it allows a broader range of healthcare workers—nurse practitioners, nurse midwives, and physician assistants—to perform abortions and allocates $3.5 million to a new program within the Maryland Department of Health to train healthcare workers. It also requires the majority of health insurance plans, including private health insurance plans, to cover abortions cost free.
- Missouri: On June 24, following the Supreme Court's ruling in Dobbs v. Jackson Women's Health Organization, Missouri attorney general Eric Schmitt signs a proclamation bringing into effect the state's trigger law, banning all non-medically necessary abortions.
- Mississippi: A law outlawing abortion in Mississippi took effect on July 7 after Mississippi State attorney general Lynn Fitch certified the June 24 Supreme Court decision on Dobbs v. Jackson Women's Health Organization.
- Tennessee: Due to the trigger law prohibiting abortion from the point of fertilization which was adopted on April 22, 2019, abortion became illegal from the point of conception on July 25, 2022.
- Wyoming's legislature passed HB92 in the 2022 legislative session, a trigger law meant to ban abortion soon after the overturn of Roe v. Wade except for cases of rape, incest (reported to law enforcement) and serious risk of death or "substantial and irreversible physical impairments" for the pregnant woman. It was blocked by Ninth District Court Judge Melissa Owens the day it took effect (July 27).
- Abortion in North Dakota has become mostly illegal since July 28, 2022 when the state's trigger law, following the Supreme Court ruling to overturn Roe v. Wade went into effect. The trigger law bans all abortions except to save the life of the mother or in the case of rape or incest, and is reported to law enforcement.
- In Hobbs, New Mexico, a local ordinance was passed in November to prevent abortion clinics from operating.
- Nantucket, Massachusetts, legally allowed for women to be topless at beaches; previously, women could be fined $300 and receive a penalty of up to three years in prison if they did so.
- In December, the Violence Against Women Act was amended to include Native Hawaiian survivors of gender-based violence and Native Hawaiian organizations in Violence Against Women Act grant funding.
- 2022 Michigan Proposal 3 was a ballot proposal that amended the Michigan Constitution to include the right to reproductive freedom, which the measure defined as "the right to make and effectuate decisions about all matters relating to pregnancy, including but not limited to prenatal care, childbirth, postpartum care, contraception, sterilization, abortion care, miscarriage management and infertility care.
- Nevada: Nevada voters voted yes to the ballot question, “Shall the Nevada Constitution be amended by adding a specific guarantee that equality of rights under the law shall not be denied or abridged by this State or any of its cities, counties, or other political subdivisions on account of race, color, creed, sex, sexual orientation, gender identity or expression, age, disability, ancestry, or national origin”.

2023

- On January 1 a law went into effect in Rhode Island, mandating equal pay for “comparable work” (defined as work requiring substantially similar skill, effort and responsibility and performed under "similar working conditions") regardless of gender, race, sexual orientation, religion, nationality, age or disability.
- 2023 - After the Supreme Court overturned Roe v. Wade in 2022, it was unclear whether Michigan's 1931 statute criminalizing abortion procedures and drugs was operative. In April 2023, Governor Gretchen Whitmer signed a bill repealing the 1931 ban, ensuring abortion access in Michigan.
- On 7 November 2023, Ohio voters approved a citizen-initiated constitutional amendment enshrining a legal right to reproductive freedom, including contraception, fertility treatment, miscarriage care up to fetal viability, making the 2019 ban, as well as other bans passed at various levels of government in the state, unenforceable. Abortion could only be banned after fetal viability, except when the abortion would be necessary to protect patient's health or life.

2024

- FDA v. Alliance for Hippocratic Medicine, 602 U.S. 367 (2024), was a United States Supreme Court case to challenge the U.S. Food and Drug Administration (FDA)'s approval of mifepristone, a drug frequently used in medical abortion procedures. The Supreme Court of the United States ruled unanimously on June 13, 2024, that the Alliance for Hippocratic Medicine (AHM) did not have association standing under Article III to bring a case, since neither AHM nor the groups it represented had shown injury. The decision reversed the lower court decisions, restoring mifepristone's availability under current FDA rules.
- Moyle v. United States, 603 U.S. ___ (2024), was a United States Supreme Court case about whether an Idaho abortion law conflicted with the federal Emergency Medical Treatment and Labor Act (EMTALA). The court initially agreed to expedite the appeal and temporarily allowed Idaho to enforce its abortion ban. After hearing the case, the court dismissed it as improvidently granted and restored a lower court order allowing emergency abortions under EMTALA. This returned the case to the lower courts without a ruling on the merits.
- Arizona: Arizona's abortion ban was repealed through legislation passed by Democratic lawmakers and five Republican lawmakers in the Arizona state legislature, and signed by Arizona Governor Katie Hobbs on May 2, 2024. This repeal of the abortion ban took effect 90 days after the legislative session ended, on September 14, 2024.
- An Ohio judge struck down the state's six-week abortion ban in October 2024 based on the previous year's constitutional amendment.

== See also ==
- Legal rights of women in history
- Sterilization law in the United States
- Timeline of reproductive rights legislation
- Timeline of women's legal rights (other than voting)
