= People v. Hernandez =

People v(s). Hernandez may refer to:

- People of California v. Hernandez (1964)
- People of the Philippines vs. Hernandez (1956)
