= People v. Pointer =

- Court: California Court of Appeal
- Full case name: The People, Plaintiff and Respondent, v. Ruby Pointer, Defendant and Appellant.
- Decided: February 17, 1984
- Citation: 151 Cal.App.3d 1128; 199 Cal. Rptr. 357

Court membership
- Judges sitting: John J. Miller, Jerome A. Smith, J. Anthony Kline

Case opinions
- Decision by: Kline
- Concurrence: Miller, Smith

Keywords
- Bodily integrity; Reproductive rights

People v. Pointer, 151 Cal.App.3d 1128, 199 Cal. Rptr. 357 (1984), is a criminal law case from the California Court of Appeal, First District, is significant because the trial judge included in his sentencing a prohibition on the defendant becoming pregnant during her period of probation. The appellate court held that such a prohibition was outside the bounds of a judge's sentencing authority. The case was remanded for resentencing to undo the overly broad prohibition against conception.

The trial court's novel sentence, along with the deeply disturbing facts of the case and the appellate court's illustrative discussion of the constitutional and policy problems with pregnancy-related conditions to probation, has merited its inclusion in a widely used Criminal Law casebook for 1L law courses. It is featured in two first-year Criminal Law courses at South Texas College of Law in Houston. The case has also been discussed or mentioned in nearly two dozen academic journal articles relating to court-imposed restrictions on conception or birth, and cited or mentioned in at least sixty-six judicial legal opinions in California, Kansas, Ohio, and Wisconsin.

== Background ==
Ruby Pointer was convicted of child endangerment and violation of a child custody decree; the trial court sentenced her to one year in county jail and five years of probation, including a condition that she must not conceive children during her probation. Pointer adhered to a rigorously disciplined macrobiotic diet that excluded all meat and dairy products, as well as many vegetables. She was a single mother and imposed this diet on her young children as well, disregarding contrary warnings from a physician.

In October 1980, the father of one of the children contacted California's Children's Protective Services, who sent a social worker to meet with the boys and their mother. The state agency instructed Pointer to meet with a pediatrician to discuss the obvious malnourishment of the children, but Pointer declined to do so. A month later, Pointer brought one of the children to a doctor, who observed the child was in the throes of starvation - emaciated, semicomatose, and in a state of shock, and in immediate need of hospitalization. When Pointer refused intravenous feeding of the child, the pediatrician contacted the police, who hospitalized the child and saved his life. As soon as the child was discharged from the hospital, Pointer took her children and fled to Puerto Rico. The FBI located her there several months later and arrested her.

Pointer was charged and found guilty by jury of violation of California Penal Code sections 273 (felony child endangerment), and 278.5 (observance of child custody decree). She was sentenced to five years probation on the condition that she serve one year in county jail; participate in counseling; not be informed of the whereabouts of Jamal, her younger son, and have no unsupervised visits with him; have no child custody of her children, without prior court approval; and that she not conceive during the probationary period.

The California Court of Appeal affirmed all conditions of the sentence, except for the last one, the prohibition to conceive. Pointer challenged this condition as an unconstitutional restriction of her fundamental rights to privacy and to procreate.

The Court found the condition reasonable because the condition was related to the crime for which she was convicted; even so, it held that it infringed on the fundamental right of privacy protected by both the federal and California state constitutions. The Court concluded that the condition prohibiting Pointer from procreating during her probationary period was overbroad and that other less restrictive alternatives were available to the trial judge. The case was remanded to the trial court for resentencing consistent with the Court's views.

George Deukmejian was the lead prosecutor in this important appeal before becoming Governor of California.
