= People of California v. Hernandez =

- Supreme Court of California

Decided July 9, 1964
- Full case name: The People, Plaintiff and Respondent, v. Francisco Angel Hernandez, Defendant and Appellant.
- Citation(s): 61 Cal.2d 529; 393 P.2d 673; 39 Cal. Rptr. 361

Holding
- Mistake of fact may be used as a defense against a charge of statutory rape. Judgement reversed.

Court membership
- Chief Justice: Phil S. Gibson
- Associate Justices: Roger J. Traynor, B. Rey Schauer, Marshall F. McComb, Raymond E. Peters, Mathew Tobriner, Paul Peek

Case opinions
- Majority: Peek, joined by Gibson, Traynor, Schauer, McComb, Peters, Tobriner

People of California v. Hernandez, 61 Cal.2d 529 (1964), was a California Supreme Court case ruling that an "honest and reasonable" mistake as to the age of a female is a valid defense to a statutory rape charge.

The defendant was charged with violating California Penal Code section 261, subd. 1, statutory rape, a misdemeanor. He pleaded "not guilty" and a jury trial followed, resulting in a conviction.

The trial judge refused to allow defendant to present evidence that the defendant had a good faith belief the female subject was of age as a defense to the charge. Defendant filed an appeal, with the sole issue being the question of whether defendant's intent and knowledge at the time of the commission of the crime mattered in determining criminal culpability.

The California Supreme Court held that "a charge of statutory rape is defensible [where] criminal intent is lacking," overruling and disapproving prior decisional law holding to the contrary, particularly People v. Ratz (1896) 115 Cal. 132.

The defense is a mistake of fact, i.e., whether the victim was 18 years or more of age, rather than a mistake of law.

The decision set off a flurry of discussion among academics on whether "the uniform rule in the United states [that] a mistake as to the age of a female is not a defense to the crime of statutory rape," is now dead letter.

Underpinning the decision is the notion that the "conclusive presumption of the lack [of consent by the minor] because she is presumed too innocent and naive to understand the implications and nature of her act," is outmoded in modern society.

In the years since People v. Hernandez was decided, one commentator has posited that the mistake of fact defense to rape has been eroded by the Rule of Equivocality. This rule states that "unless there is 'substantial evidence of equivocal conduct that would have led a defendant to reasonably and in good faith believe consent existed where it did not," the mistake of fact defense is not available.
