= Timeline of reproductive rights legislation =

This is a timeline of reproductive rights legislation, a chronological list of laws and legal decisions affecting human reproductive rights. Reproductive rights are a sub-set of human rights pertaining to issues of reproduction and reproductive health. These rights may include some or all of the following: the right to legal or safe abortion, the right to birth control, the right to access quality reproductive healthcare, and the right to education and access in order to make reproductive choices free from coercion, discrimination, and violence. Reproductive rights may also include the right to receive education about contraception and sexually transmitted infections, and freedom from coerced sterilization, abortion, and contraception, and protection from practices such as female genital mutilation (FGM).

== 17th century–19th century ==
- End of 16th century – In England Sir Edward Coke formulated the "born alive rule" in common law, which holds that various criminal laws, such as homicide and assault, apply only to a child that is "born alive".
- 1765 – In England post-quickening abortion is no longer considered homicide in England, but William Blackstone confirms the "born alive rule" and calls it "a very heinous misdemeanor".
- 1778 – In Sweden, the first Infanticide Act granted mothers the right and the means for an anonymous birth.
- 1793 – In the French First Republic, Article 326 of the Code Civil legalized both anonymous and confidential births.
- 1803 – The United Kingdom enacted Lord Ellenborough's Act, making abortion after quickening a capital crime, and providing lesser penalties for the felony of abortion before quickening.
- 1810 – The 1810 Napoleonic Code of the First French Empire punished any person who procured an abortion with imprisonment.
- 1821 – A Connecticut law targeted apothecaries who sold "poisons" to women for the purpose of inducing an abortion.
- 1827 – An Illinois law prohibited the sale of drugs that could induce abortions. The law classed these medications as a "poison". The 1827 law was the first in the nation to impose criminal penalties in connection with abortion before quickening.
- 1827 – In New York State the first statute to criminalize abortion was enacted which made post-quickening abortions a felony and made pre-quickening abortions a misdemeanor.
- 1842 – In Japan the Tokugawa shogunate banned induced abortion in Edo. The law did not affect the rest of the country.
- 1845 – New York passed a statute that said women who had abortions could be given a prison sentence of three months to a year. They were one of the few states at the time to have laws punishing women for procuring abortions.
- 1849 – The Wisconsin state legislature passed a law that criminalized abortion, making it a felony for a doctor to perform an abortion on a woman, no matter the circumstances of her pregnancy including pregnancy as a result of rape or incest, unless the pregnancy endangers the life of the mother.
- 1854 – Texas passed an abortion law that made performing an abortion, except in the case of preserving the life of the mother, a criminal offense punishable by two to five years in prison. The law, found in Articles 4512.1 to 4512.4, had a proviso that anyone who provided medication or other means to assist in performing an abortion was an accomplice who could also be charged.
- 1856 – In Sweden, an amendment to the 1778 Infanticide Act restricted the right to give birth anonymously to a mere confidential birth.
- 1867 – Illinois passed a bill that made abortion and attempted abortion a criminal offense.
- 1869 – The Parliament of Canada unified criminal law in all provinces, banning abortion.
- c. 1870 – Illinois passed another law banning the sale of drugs that could cause induced abortions. The law is notable because it allowed an exception for "the written prescription of some well-known and respectable practicing physician".
- 1872 – New York state made it a penalty to perform an abortion, with a criminal sentence of between 4 and 20 years in prison.
- 1873 – The passage of the Comstock Act in the United States makes it illegal to send any "obscene, lewd, and/or lascivious" materials through the mail, including contraceptive devices and information on contraception or abortion and how to obtain them. (see also advertisement of abortion services).
- 1820–1900 – In the United States, primarily through the efforts of physicians in the American Medical Association and legislators, most abortions were outlawed.

== 20th century ==
=== 1910s ===
- 1918 – In the United States, Margaret Sanger was charged under the New York law against disseminating contraceptive information. On appeal, her conviction was reversed on the grounds that contraceptive devices could legally be promoted for the cure and prevention of disease.

=== 1920s ===
- 1920 – In France, a law forbidding all forms of contraception and information about it was enacted.
- 1920 – In the Soviet Union, Vladimir Lenin legalized abortion on request, the first country to do so. The law was first introduced in the Russian SFSR, and then the rest of the country in 1922.
- 1921 – In the Ukrainian SSR the law legalizing abortion on request in the Soviet Union was introduced in July, and then in the rest of the country.

=== 1930s ===
- 1931 – In Mexico abortion was legalized in cases of rape.
- 1931 - A 1931 law criminalized abortion in Michigan except when the mother's life was in danger.
- 1932 – Poland was the first country in Europe outside the Soviet Union to legalize abortion in cases of rape and threat to maternal health.
- 1935 – Iceland became the first Western country to legalize therapeutic abortion under limited circumstances.
- 1935 – Nazi Germany amended its eugenics law to promote abortion for women with hereditary disorders. The law allowed abortion if a woman gave her permission, and if the fetus was not yet viable, and for purposes of so-called racial hygiene.
- 1935 – In Ireland contraception was made illegal under the 1935 Criminal Law (Amendment) Act.
- 1936 – Joseph Stalin reversed most parts of Lenin's legalization of abortion in the Soviet Union to increase population growth.
- 1936 – A US federal appeals court ruled in United States v. One Package of Japanese Pessaries that the federal government could not interfere with doctors providing contraception to their patients.
- 1936 – The Government of Catalonia legalised free abortion during the first 12 weeks of pregnancy.
- 1938 – In Britain, Aleck Bourne aborted the pregnancy of a young girl who had been raped by British soldiers. Bourne was acquitted after turning himself in to authorities. The legal precedent of allowing abortion in order to avoid mental or physical damage was adopted by other countries in the Commonwealth of Nations. (Rex v Bourne)
- 1938 – In Sweden abortion was legalized on a limited basis.
- 1939 – The Penal Code of France was altered to permit an abortion that would save the pregnant woman's life.

=== 1940s ===
- 1948 – The Eugenic Protection Law in Japan expanded the circumstances in which abortion is allowed.

=== 1950s ===
- 1955 – The government of South Korea criminalized abortion in the 1953 Criminal Code in all circumstances.
- 1955 – In the Soviet Union abortion was legalized again.
- 1959 – The American Law Institute (ALI) in the United States drafted a model state abortion law to make legal abortions accessible.

=== 1960s ===
- 1964 – In Norway the first law to legalize abortion was passed. It allowed abortion in cases of danger to the mother, and the abortion decision was made by two doctors.
- 1965 – Griswold v. Connecticut, 381 U.S. 479 (1965), was a landmark decision of the U.S Supreme Court in which the Court ruled that the Constitution of the United States protects the liberty of married couples to buy and use contraceptives without government restriction. The case involved a Connecticut "Comstock law" that prohibited any person from using "any drug, medicinal article or instrument for the purpose of preventing conception". The court held that the statute was unconstitutional and that its effect was "to deny disadvantaged citizens ... access to medical assistance and up-to-date information in respect to proper methods of birth control". By a vote of 7–2, the Supreme Court invalidated the law on the grounds that it violated the "right to marital privacy", establishing the basis for the right to privacy with respect to intimate practices. This and other cases view the right to privacy as "protected from governmental intrusion".
- 1965 – The New York State Legislature amended their abortion-related statute to allow for more therapeutic exceptions.
- 1966 – In Romania, the Ceauşescu regime enacted Decree 770 which banned all abortion in Romania and contraception, except in very limited cases in an attempt to boost the country's population.
- 1966 – The Mississippi legislature made abortion legal in cases of rape.
- 1967 – In France the Neuwirth Law lifted the ban on birth control methods, including oral contraception, on 28 December 1967.
- 1967 – The UK Abortion Act (effective 1968) legalized abortion in the United Kingdom under certain grounds (except in Northern Ireland).
- 1967 – Colorado became the first state to decriminalize abortion in cases of rape, incest, or in which pregnancy would lead to permanent physical disability of the woman. Similar laws were passed in both California and North Carolina.
- 1968 – The US states of Georgia and Maryland reformed their abortion laws based on the American Law Institute Model Penal Code.
- 1968 – In the United States President Lyndon B. Johnson's Committee on The Status of Women released a report calling for a repeal of all abortion laws.
- 1969 – Arkansas, Delaware, Kansas, and New Mexico reformed their abortion laws based on the American Law Institute Model Penal Code.
- 1969 – The New Mexico legislature passed a law that made it a felony for anyone to provide a woman with an abortion unless it was needed to save her life, or because her pregnancy was a result of rape or incest.
- 1969 – Canada passed the Criminal Law Amendment Act, 1968-69, which began to allow abortion for selective reasons.
- 1969 – The ruling in the Victorian case of R v Davidson defined for the first time which abortions were lawful in Australia.
- 1969 – Singapore passed The Abortion Act 1969 (effective 1970) which legalised abortion in Singapore. It was then replaced by the Termination of Pregnancy Act 1974. This allowed all women to abort a fetus "on request" before 24 weeks of the pregnancy had passed, unless the treatment is immediately necessary to save the life or to prevent grave permanent injury to the physical or mental health of the pregnant woman.
- 1969 – The California Supreme Court ruled in favor of abortion rights, after hearing an appeal launched by Leon Belous, who had been convicted of referring a woman to someone who could provide her with an illegal abortion; California's abortion law was declared unconstitutional in People v. Belous because it was vague and denied people due process.

=== 1970s ===
- 1970 – Hawaii, New York, Alaska and Washington repealed their abortion laws. Hawaii became the first state to legalize abortions on the request of the woman, New York repealed its 1830 law, and Washington held a referendum on legalizing early pregnancy abortions, becoming the first state to legalize abortion through a vote of the people.
- 1970 – South Carolina and Virginia reformed their abortion laws based on the American Law Institute Model Penal Code.
- 1970 – The New York Senate passed a law decriminalizing abortion in most cases. Republican Governor Nelson A. Rockefeller signed the bill into law the next day. The 1970 law did several things. First, it added a consent provision requiring a physician to obtain the woman's consent before performing an abortion. Second, it permitted physician-provided elective abortion services within the first 24 weeks of pregnancy or to preserve the woman's life. Third, it permitted a woman, when acting upon the advice of a duly licensed physician, to perform an "abortional act" on herself within the first 24 weeks of pregnancy or to preserve her life.
- 1970 – Family Planning Services and Population Research Act of 1970 Pub. L. 91–572, which established the Public Health Service Title X program in the United States, provided family planning services for those in need.
- 1970 – The U.S. Congress removed references to contraception from federal anti-obscenity laws.
- 1971 – In a 1971 case, Trust Territory v. Tarkong, the Appellate Court of the Trust Territory (see also United States territorial court) held:
  As far as the woman herself is concerned, unless the abortion statute expressly makes her responsible, it is generally held, although the statute reads any "person", that she is not liable to any criminal prosecution, whether she solicits the act or performs it upon herself.
- 1971 – Alaska repealed its statute that said inducing an abortion was a criminal offense.
- 1971 – The Parliament of India, under the Prime Ministership of Indira Gandhi, passes the Medical Termination of Pregnancy Act 1971 (MTP Act 1971), which was authored by Sripati Chandrasekhar. India thus became one of the earliest nations to pass such an act.
- 1972 – The Vermont Supreme Court made a ruling that effectively ended abortion restrictions in the state.
- 1972 – Florida reformed its abortion law based on the American Law Institute Model Penal Code.
- 1972 – The U.S. Supreme Court, in Eisenstadt v. Baird, extended Griswold v. Connecticut birth control rights to unmarried couples.
- 1972 – In Abele v. Markle, 351 F. Supp. 224 (D. Conn. 1972) it was ruled that a Connecticut statute prohibiting abortions, except to save the life of the mother, was unconstitutional.
- 1973 – The U.S. Church Amendment of 1973 prohibits hospitals receiving federal funds from discriminating against a doctor on the basis of whether the doctor provides abortions or sterilizations.
- 1973 – The U.S. Supreme Court, in Roe v. Wade, declared all individual state bans on abortion during the first trimester to be unconstitutional, allowed states to regulate but not proscribe abortion during the second trimester, and allowed states to proscribe abortion during the third trimester unless an abortion is in the best interest of the woman's physical or mental health. The Court legalized abortion in all trimesters when a woman's doctor believes the abortion is necessary for her physical or mental health and held that only a "compelling state interest" justified regulations limiting the individual right to privacy.
- 1973 – Doe v. Bolton, 410 U.S. 179 (1973), was a decision of the United States Supreme Court overturning the abortion law of Georgia. The Supreme Court's decision was released on 22 January 1973, the same day as the decision in the better-known case of Roe v. Wade, 410 U.S. 113 (1973). Doe v. Bolton challenged Georgia's much more liberal abortion statute.
- 1973 – Denmark granted its permanent residents the right to legal abortion up to the end of the 12th week of pregnancy.
- 1973 – In South Korea the abortion law was amended by the Maternal and Child Health Law of 1973, which permitted a physician to perform an abortion if the pregnant woman or her spouse suffered from certain hereditary or communicable diseases, if the pregnancy resulted from rape or incest, or if continuing the pregnancy would jeopardize the woman's health. Any physician who violated the law was punished with two years imprisonment. Self-induced abortions were illegal, and punishable by a fine or imprisonment.
- 1974 – In Ireland McGee v. The Attorney General [1974] IR 284 was a case in the Irish Supreme Court in 1974 that referenced Article 41 of the Irish Constitution. It concerned Mary McGee, whose condition was such that she was advised by her physician that if she would become pregnant again, her life would be endangered. She was then instructed to use a diaphragm and spermicidal jelly that was prescribed to her. However, Section 17 of the Criminal Law Amendment Act, 1935 prohibited her from acquiring the prescription. The Supreme Court ruled by a 4 to 1 majority in favor of her, after determining that married couples have the constitutional right to make private decisions on family planning.
- 1974 – Emergency legislation was passed by the House of Lords to allow medical staff stationed at Sovereign Base Areas in Cyprus to perform emergency abortions for raped women and girls following the Turkish invasion of Cyprus.
- 1974 – Kentucky adopted a law preventing public hospitals from performing abortion procedures except to protect the life of the mother.
- 1975–1980 – France (1975), West Germany (1976), New Zealand (1977), Italy (1978), and the Netherlands (1980) legalized abortion on demand in the first trimester. In France, no elective abortions were allowed for non-medical reasons after 10–12 weeks of gestation.
- 1975 – The 79th General Assembly enacted the Illinois Abortion Law, which included a trigger law providing that if Roe v. Wade were overturned or repealed, "the former policy of this State to prohibit abortions unless necessary for the preservation of the mother's life shall be reinstated."
- 1975 – On 19 February 1975, the Texas Supreme Court ruled in the case Jacobs v. Theimer that a woman could sue her doctor for wrongful birth. That case involved Dortha Jean Jacobs (later Dortha Biggs), who caught rubella while pregnant and gave birth to Lesli, who was severely disabled. Dortha and her husband sued her doctor, saying he did not diagnose the rubella or warn them how it would affect the pregnancy.
- 1976–1977 – Representative Henry Hyde of Illinois sponsored the Hyde Amendment, which passed, and allowed U.S. states to prohibit the use of Medicaid funding for abortions.
- 1978 – The US federal Pregnancy Discrimination Act was passed, prohibiting employment discrimination on the basis of pregnancy, childbirth, or related medical conditions.
- 1978 – In the spring of 1978, the law on free access to abortion in Norway was passed.
- 1978 – Akron, Ohio, passed a city ordinance that restricted abortion rights.
- 1979 – The People's Republic of China enacted a one-child policy to alleviate social, economic, and environmental problems, encouraging couples to have no more than one child, and in some cases imposing penalties for violating the policy.
- 1979 – The Ireland, Health (Family Planning) Act 1979 allowed the sale of contraceptives, upon presentation of a prescription.
- 1979 – A court found a Missouri law requiring women past their first trimester to have their abortions performed in a hospital unconstitutional.

=== 1980s ===
- 1980 – In 1974, Kentucky adopted a law preventing public hospitals from performing abortion procedures except to protect the life of the mother. The law was later ruled unconstitutional by the Sixth Circuit Court of Appeals. The state legislature passed a new version of the law in 1980.
- 1980 – In William v. Zbaraz, the United States Supreme Court upheld that states could constitutionally make their own versions of the anti-abortion Hyde Amendment, and that states/the federal government have no statutory or constitutional obligation to fund medically necessary abortions.
- 1981 – In Italy a proposal promoted by the Catholic Church to repeal the 1978 abortion law was rejected by 68% of the voters in a referendum.
- 1982 – The Pennsylvania government passed the Abortion Control Act. The law required women seeking abortions to wait 24 hours before getting an abortion. It also required the informed consent of parents for minors seeking abortions and the informed consent of husbands for married women seeking abortions.
- 1982 – In France the government passes a bill that includes abortions under the French social security system.
- 1983 – The Eighth Amendment of the Constitution of Ireland was passed, recognizing "the unborn" as having a right to life equal to that of "the mother".
- 1983 – The illegal abortion conviction of a Wayne County, Kentucky man put the issue of abortion before the Kentucky Supreme Court. The court ruled that a seven-month-old fetus killed by the man during an attack on his wife could not be defined as a person under the Model Penal Code.
- 1984 – In July the California Courts of Appeal overturned Superior Court of Los Angeles County judge Eli Chernow, ruling that fetuses could not be buried as human remains in the Los Angeles fetus disposal scandal.
- 1985 – The Wisconsin law "Wisconsin Stat. § 940.15", enacted in 1985, made abortion a crime only after viability, and allowed abortion after viability "if the abortion is necessary to preserve the life or health of the woman, as determined by reasonable medical judgment of the woman's attending physician."
- 1985 – Article 12's May 1986 supplement to the Northern Mariana Islands Commonwealth Constitution stipulated that "the abortion of the unborn child during the mother's pregnancy is prohibited by the Commonwealth of the Northern Mariana Islands, except as provided by law." The measure was adopted in 1985.
- 1985 – A directive from the American Samoa Attorney General stated that elective abortions were unconstitutional and such procedures could not occur at public hospitals.
- 1985 – In Honduras, abortion became completely illegal.
- 1985 – In Ireland, the Health (Family Planning) (Amendment) Act, 1985 allowed the sale of condoms and spermicides to people over 18 without having to present a prescription.
- 1985 – The British Prohibition of Female Circumcision Act 1985 made female genital mutilation a crime throughout the UK. The Act was replaced by the Female Genital Mutilation Act 2003 and the Prohibition of Female Genital Mutilation (Scotland) Act 2005 respectively, both of which extended the legislation to cover acts committed by UK nationals outside the UK's borders.
- 1986 – American Samoa's legal code section 46.3904 established that no physician or hospital employee can be compelled to participate in an abortion procedure if doing so goes against their conscience, and that such refusals are immune to criminal, administrative or disciplinary action. Other legal code sections declared that the only people who can legally perform legal abortions are licensed American Samoan physicians. Legal code sections 46.3902 and 46.3903 made any attempt to terminate a pregnancy except in the case of saving the physical or mental health of the mother a crime.
- 1986 – The Kentucky General Assembly passed legislation requiring parental consent for minors seeking abortions. The law required the consent of only the custodial parent if the parents did not live together, and also allowed the minor to petition a district or circuit court for permission.
- 1988 – France legalized the "abortion pill" mifepristone (RU-486).
- 1988 – In R. v. Morgentaler, the Supreme Court of Canada struck down an abortion regulation which allowed abortions in some circumstances but required approval of a committee of doctors for violating a woman's constitutional "security of person"; Canadian law has not regulated abortion since.
- 1988 - Stallman v. Youngquist, 531 N.E.2d 355, 359-61 (Ill. 1988) was a court case refusing to recognize the tort of maternal prenatal negligence, holding that granting fetuses legal rights in this manner "would involve an unprecedented intrusion into the privacy and autonomy of the [state's female] citizens".
- 1989 – Webster v. Reproductive Health Services in the United States reinforced states' rights to prevent publicly funded facilities from providing or assisting with abortion services.

=== 1990s ===
- 1990 - In re A.C., 573 A.2d 1235 (1990), was a District of Columbia Court of Appeals case that was the first American appellate court case decided against a forced Caesarean section, although the decision was issued after the fatal procedure was performed. Physicians performed a Caesarean section upon patient Angela Carder (née Stoner) without informed consent in an unsuccessful attempt to save the life of her baby. The case stands as a landmark in United States case law establishing the rights of informed consent and bodily integrity for pregnant women.
- 1990 – The Legislature of Guam enacted a law prohibiting abortion in all cases except when there was "substantial risk" to the woman's life or continuing the pregnancy would "gravely impair" her health. This law was challenged by the American Civil Liberties Union and struck down by the ninth circuit court of Guam in a case called Guam Society of Obstetricians and Gynecologists v. Ada in 1997.
- 1990 – Nevada voters approved Question 7 to affirm a statute (Nevada Revised Statutes Chapter 442, section 250) permitting abortion up to 24 weeks gestation by 63.5% of the vote. With the affirmation, the Nevada Legislature may not in any way alter that statute unless it is first repealed by the state's voters in a direct vote.
- 1990 – The Abortion Act in the UK was amended so that abortion is legal only up to 24 weeks, rather than 28, except in unusual cases.
- 1992 – In Planned Parenthood v. Casey, the Supreme Court of the United States overturned the trimester framework in Roe v. Wade, making it legal for states to proscribe abortion after the point of fetal viability, excepting instances that would risk the woman's health.
- 1992 – In Ireland, the X Case (Attorney General v X [1992] 1 IR 1), was a landmark Irish Supreme Court case which established the right of Irish women to an abortion if a pregnant woman's life was at risk because of pregnancy, including the risk of suicide. Following his retirement, Supreme Court Justice Hugh O'Flaherty said that the X Case was "peculiar to its own particular facts", since X miscarried and did not have an abortion, and this renders the case moot in Irish law. (See below events in 2012/2013).
- 1992 – The Thirteenth Amendment of the Constitution of Ireland was passed, specifying that the protection of the right to life of the unborn does not limit freedom of travel in and out of the state.
- 1992 – The Fourteenth Amendment of the Constitution of Ireland was passed, specifying that the protection of the right to life of the unborn does not limit the right to distribute information about services in foreign countries.
- 1993 – Maine passed abortion-related legislation that said women have the right to "terminate a pregnancy before viability".
- 1993 – In Ireland, the Health (Family Planning) (Amendment) Act, 1992 allowed the sale of contraceptives without a prescription.
- 1993 – Poland banned abortion, except in cases of rape, incest, severe congenital disorders, or threat to the life of the pregnant woman.
- 1993 – R v Morgentaler was a decision by the Supreme Court of Canada invalidating a provincial attempt to regulate abortion in Canada. In the decision, the provincial regulations were ruled to be a criminal law, and in violation of the Constitution Act, 1867, which assigns criminal law exclusively to the Parliament of Canada.
- 1994 – Madsen v. Women's Health Center, Inc., 512 U.S. 753 (1994), was a United States Supreme Court case where petitioners challenged the constitutionality of an injunction entered by a Florida state court prohibiting anti-abortion protesters from demonstrating in certain places and in various ways outside a health clinic that performs abortions. The Madsen majority sustained the constitutionality of the Clinic's thirty-six-foot buffer zone and the noise-level provision, finding that they burdened no more speech than necessary to serve the injunction's goals. However, the Court struck down the thirty-six-foot buffer zone as applied to the private property north and west of the clinic, the "images observable" provision, the three-hundred-foot no-approach zone around the clinic, and the three-hundred-foot buffer zone around residences. The Court found that these provisions "[swept] more broadly than necessary" to protect the state's interests. Thus, the judgment of the Florida Supreme Court was affirmed in part and reversed in part.
- 1994 – The Freedom of Access to Clinic Entrances Act was passed by the United States Congress, forbidding the use of force or obstruction to prevent someone from providing or receiving reproductive health services.
- 1994 - In re Baby Boy Doe, 632 N.E.2d 326 (Ill. App. Ct. 1994) was a court case holding that courts may not balance whatever rights a fetus may have against the rights of a competent woman, whose choice to refuse medical treatment as invasive as a Cesarean section must be honored even if the choice may be harmful to the fetus.
- 1995 – The Attorney General announces that constitutionally, women have a legal right to an abortion in the Northern Mariana Islands.
- 1995 – The 89th Illinois General Assembly enacted the Parental Notice of Abortion Act, a parental notification law. The Act required physicians to give 48 hours notice to the parent, grandparent or guardian of a minor seeking an abortion. However, the law was enjoined by the courts for more than two decades.
- 1997 - In re Fetus Brown, 689 N.E.2d 397, 400 (Ill. App. Ct. 1997) was a court case overturning a court-ordered blood transfusion of a pregnant woman.
- 1997 – A Louisiana law created a civil cause of action for abortion-related damages, including damage to the unborn, for up to ten years after the abortion. The same law also barred the state's Patient's Compensation Fund, which limits malpractice liability for participating physicians, from insuring against abortion-related claims.
- 1997 – In 1990, the Legislature of Guam enacted a law prohibiting abortion in all cases except when there was "substantial risk" to the woman's life or continuing the pregnancy would "gravely impair" her health. This law was challenged by the American Civil Liberties Union and struck down by the Ninth Circuit Court of Guam in 1997 in Guam Society of Obstetricians and Gynecologists v. Ada.
- 1997 – New Hampshire Governor Jeanne Shaheen signed legislation that repealed most of the abortion restrictions in place in the state.
- 1997 – The Kansas legislature passed the Woman's Right to Know Act, which required, except in the case of a medical emergency, a 24-hour period between the time that the woman is informed in writing of legally-required information and the abortion.
- 1997 – In South Africa, the Choice on Termination of Pregnancy Act, 1996 came into effect, allowing elective abortion care. The Abortion and Sterilization Act, 1975, which only allowed abortions in very limited circumstances, was repealed.
- 1997 – Honduras established a penalty from three to six years in prison for women who obtain an abortion and for medical staff who are involved in the process.
- 1997 – The Montana Legislature passed a law that said only physicians could perform abortions. Following a lawsuit, the law was changed to allow nurse practitioners to perform abortions.
- 1998 – In Christian Lawyers Association and Others v Minister of Health and Others, the Transvaal Provincial Division of the High Court of South Africa upheld the Choice on Termination of Pregnancy Act, holding that the Constitution of South Africa does not forbid abortions.
- 1998 – In Portugal, the legalization of abortion until 10 weeks of pregnancy is rejected by voters in a referendum. A second referendum was eventually held nine years later, in which voters approved the legalization of abortion with the same time restrictions.
- 1998 – The Kentucky General Assembly passed legislation requiring clinics to have an Abortion Clinic License if they wanted to operate. Part of this was a requirement for a transfer agreement between the clinic and a hospital and ambulance.
- 1999 – In the United States, Congress passed a ban on intact dilation and extraction, which President Bill Clinton vetoed.
- 1999 - Pemberton v. Tallahassee Memorial Regional Center, 66 F. Supp. 2d 1247 (N.D. Fla. 1999), is a case in the United States regarding reproductive rights. Pemberton had a previous c-section (vertical incision), and with her second child attempted to have a VBAC (vaginal birth after c-section). When a doctor she had approached about a related issue at the Tallahassee Memorial Regional Center found out, he and the hospital sued to force her to get a c-section. The court held that the rights of the fetus at or near birth outweighed the rights of Pemberton to determine her own medical care. She was physically forced to stop laboring, and taken to the hospital, where a c-section was performed. Her suit against the hospital was dismissed. The court held that a cesarean section at the end of a full-term pregnancy was here deemed to be medically necessary by doctors to avoid a substantial risk that the fetus would die during delivery due to uterine rupture, a risk of 4–6% according to the hospital's doctors and 2% according to Pemberton's doctors. Furthermore, the court held that a state's interest in preserving the life of an unborn child outweighed the mother's constitutional interest of bodily integrity. The court held that Roe v. Wade was not applicable, because bearing an unwanted child is a greater intrusion on the mother's constitutional interests than undergoing a cesarean section to deliver a child that the mother affirmatively desires to deliver. The court further distinguished In re A.C. by stating that it left open the possibility that a non-consenting patient's interest would yield to a more compelling countervailing interest in an "extremely rare and truly exceptional case." The court then held this case to be such.

== 21st century ==
=== 2000s ===
- 2000 – In Stenberg v. Carhart, the Supreme Court of the United States overturned a Nebraska state law that banned intact dilation and extraction.
- 2000 – The Equal Employment Opportunity Commission of the United States ruled that companies that provided insurance for prescription drugs to their employees but excluded birth control were violating the Civil Rights Act of 1964.
- 2001 – The ten-week limit on abortion in France was extended to the twelfth week.
- 2001 – Minors are no longer required to have parental consent for abortion in France. A pregnant girl in France under the age of 18 may ask for an abortion without consulting her parents if she is accompanied to the clinic by an adult of her choice, who must not tell her parents or any third party about the abortion.
- 2002 – The California State Legislature passed a law that said: "The state may not deny or interfere with a woman's right to choose or obtain an abortion prior to viability of the fetus, or when the abortion is necessary to protect the life or health of the woman."
- 2003 – In June 2003, the New Hampshire Parental Notification Prior to Abortion Act, "an act requiring parental notification before abortions may be performed on unemancipated minors," was narrowly passed by the New Hampshire General Court. This law was repealed in 2007.
- 2003 – The U.S. enacted the Partial-Birth Abortion Ban Act, and President George W. Bush signed it into law. After the law was challenged in three appeals courts, the U.S. Supreme Court held that it was constitutional because, unlike the earlier Nebraska state law, it was not vague or overly broad. The court also held that banning the procedure did not constitute an "undue burden", even without a health exception (see also Gonzales v. Carhart).
- 2003 – Scheidler v. National Organization for Women, 537 U.S. 393 (2003), was a United States Supreme Court case involving whether abortion providers could receive damages from protesters under the RICO Act. The National Organization for Women (NOW) obtained class status for women seeking the use of women's health clinics and began its court battle against Joseph Scheidler and PLAN et al. in 1986. In this particular case, the court's opinion was that extortion did not apply to the defendants' actions because they did not obtain any property from the respondents (NOW and the class of women).
- 2003 – The Indiana Supreme Court recognized the medical malpractice tort of "wrongful pregnancy" when a woman became pregnant after a failed sterilization procedure. The court decided that the damages may include the cost of the pregnancy but may not include the ordinary cost of raising the child, as the benefits of rearing the child could not be calculated.
- 2005 – The U.S. Deficit Reduction Act of 2005 (implemented in January 2007) prevented college health centers and many health care providers from participating in the drug pricing discount program, which formerly allowed contraceptives to be sold at a low cost to students and women of low income in the United States.
- 2005 – South Dakota's legislature passed five laws curtailing the legality of abortion in 2005.
- 2006 – Governor Kathleen Blanco of Louisiana signed into law a ban on most forms of abortion (unless the life of the mother was in danger or her health would be permanently damaged) once it passed the Louisiana State Legislature. The bill would only go into effect if the United States Supreme Court reversed Roe v. Wade. Louisiana's measure would allow the prosecution of any person who performed or aided in an abortion. The penalties include up to 10 years in prison and a maximum fine of $100,000.
- 2007 – The New Hampshire Parental Notification Prior to Abortion Act, "an act requiring parental notification before abortions may be performed on unemancipated minors," was repealed.
- 2007 – The Parliament of Portugal voted to legalize abortion during the first ten weeks of pregnancy. This followed a referendum that, while revealing that a majority of Portuguese voters favored the legalization of early-stage abortions, failed due to low voter turnout. A second referendum passed, however, and President Aníbal Cavaco Silva signed the measure into effect in April 2007.
- 2007 – The government of Mexico City legalized abortion during the first 12 weeks of pregnancy, and offered free abortions. On 28 August 2008, the Mexican Supreme Court upheld the law.
- 2007 – The U.S. Supreme Court upholds the Partial Birth Abortion Ban Act of 2003.
- 2007 – The Massachusetts legislature passed a law that established a 35-foot buffer zone around abortion clinics. The law was struck down in 2014.
- 2008 – The Australian state of Victoria passed a bill decriminalizing abortion, making it legally accessible to women in the first 24 weeks of pregnancy.
- 2009 – In Spain, a bill decriminalized abortion, making it legally accessible to women in the first 14 weeks of pregnancy.

=== 2010s ===
==== 2010 ====
- 2010 – Nebraska became the first state to use the disputed notion of fetal pain as a rationale to ban abortion after 20 weeks.
- 2010 – In Chile, the Morning After Pill Law came into force, setting rules on information, advice and services relating to fertility regulation, and allowing the free distribution of oral contraceptives in public clinics.
- 2010 - Burton v. Florida, 49 So.3d 263 (2010), was a Florida District Court of Appeals case ruling that the court cannot impose unwanted treatment on a pregnant woman "in the best interests of the fetus" without providing evidence of fetal viability.

==== 2011 ====
- 2011 – A New Hampshire parental notification law regarding abortion was passed again in 2011 after the Republican-controlled House and Senate overrode Democratic Governor John Lynch's veto.
- 2011 – The U.S. Department of Health and Human Services established the policy, effective 2012, that all private insurance plans are required to provide contraceptive coverage to women without a co-pay or deductible.

==== 2012 ====
- 2012 – In Planned Parenthood v. Rounds, the United States Court of Appeals for the Eighth Circuit ruled that a South Dakota law, requiring that doctors give patients information about the potential suicide risk in women who have abortions, was not unconstitutional.
- 2012 – In Guam, the Woman's Reproductive Health Information Act was passed, creating new restrictions for abortion provision, including a 13-week gestational age limit, a physician-only requirement, and a 24-hour mandatory waiting period.
- 2012 – An early pregnancy abortion bill (SB 1274) was signed into law by then-Oklahoma governor Mary Fallin. The law required abortion providers to ask women if they wanted to hear the fetal heartbeat before ending the pregnancy, and applied when the fetus was at least eight weeks old.
- 2012 – New Hampshire passed a law requiring minors to wait 48 hours after requesting an abortion, but no longer requiring parental consent.
- 2012 – The Mississippi State Legislature passed a law requiring abortion clinics to have doctors on staff with hospital admitting privileges.
- 2012 – Arizona Governor Jan Brewer signed into law in April 2012 abortion restrictions that prohibited the procedure after 20 weeks. The U.S. Ninth Circuit Court of Appeals overturned this law in January 2015, but it remains on the books.
- 2012 – In the Philippines, the Congress of the Philippines passed the Responsible Parenthood and Reproductive Health Act of 2012 which guarantees universal access to contraception, fertility control and maternal care. The bill also mandates the teaching of sexual education in schools.
- 2012 – Uruguay legalized abortion in the first trimester, making it legally accessible to women.

==== 2013 ====
- 2013 – A Wisconsin law, Act 37, was passed requiring abortion providers to have admitting privileges at a nearby hospital.
- 2013 – Ohio passed a Targeted Regulation of Abortion Providers (TRAP) bill containing provisions related to admitting privileges and licensing and requiring clinics to have a transfer agreement with a hospital.
- 2013 – A law was signed in Ohio by Governor John Kasich, which mandates, among other things, that doctors who do not test for a fetal heartbeat when a patient seeks an abortion, tell the patient in writing if there is a heartbeat, and then tell them the statistical likelihood that the fetus could be carried to term, are subject to criminal penalties; specifically, "The doctor's failure to do so would be a first-degree misdemeanor, carrying up to six months in jail, for the first violation and a fourth-degree felony, carrying up to 18 months in jail, for subsequent violations."
- 2013 – United States, Kansas lawmakers approved sweeping anti-abortion legislation (HB 2253) on 6 April 2013, that says life begins at fertilization, forbids abortion based on gender and bans Planned Parenthood from providing sex education in schools.
- 2013 – A bill banning abortion after twelve weeks was passed on 31 January 2013, by the Arkansas Senate, but vetoed in Arkansas by Governor Mike Beebe. On 6 March 2013, his veto was overridden by the Arkansas House of Representatives. A federal judge issued a temporary injunction against the Arkansas law in May 2013, and in March 2014, it was struck down by federal judge Susan Webber Wright, who described the law as unconstitutional.

==== 2014 ====
- 2014 – Louisiana passed a law that appeared to require it to maintain a database of women who had abortions in the state and the type of abortion the woman had.
- 2014 – Act 620 passed in Louisiana. Modeled after a law passed earlier in Texas, it required that any doctor performing abortions also have admittance privileges at an authorized hospital within a 30-mile radius of the abortion clinic, among other new requirements. At the time the law was passed, only one doctor had these privileges, effectively leaving only one legal abortion clinic in the state.
- 2014 – Burwell v. Hobby Lobby, 573 U.S. ___ (2014), was a landmark decision by the United States Supreme Court allowing closely held for-profit corporations to be exempt from laws its owners religiously object to if there is a less restrictive means of furthering the law's interest. It is the first time that the court has recognized a for-profit corporation's claim of religious belief, but it is limited to closely held corporations. (Note: "Closely held" corporations are defined by the Internal Revenue Service as those which a) have more than 50% of the value of their outstanding stock owned (directly or indirectly) by five or fewer individuals at any time during the last half of the tax year; and b) are not personal service corporations. By this definition, approximately 90% of U.S. corporations are "closely held", and approximately 52% of the U.S. workforce is employed by "closely held" corporations. See Blake, Aaron (30 June 2014). "A LOT of people could be affected by the Supreme Court's birth control decision – theoretically". The Washington Post.) The decision is an interpretation of the Religious Freedom Restoration Act (RFRA) and does not address whether such corporations are protected by the free-exercise of religion clause of the First Amendment of the Constitution. For such companies, the Court's majority directly struck down the contraceptive mandate, a regulation adopted by the US Department of Health and Human Services (HHS) under the Affordable Care Act (ACA) requiring employers to cover certain contraceptives for their female employees, by a 5–4 vote. The court said that the mandate was not the least restrictive way to ensure access to contraceptive care, noting that a less restrictive alternative was being provided for religious non-profits, until the Court issued an injunction three days later, effectively ending said alternative, replacing it with a government-sponsored alternative for any female employees of closely held corporations that do not wish to provide birth control.
- 2014 – McCullen v. Coakley, 573 U.S. ___ (2014), was a United States Supreme Court case. The Court unanimously held that Massachusetts' 35-feet fixed abortion buffer zones, established via amendments to that state's Reproductive Health Care Facilities Act, violated the First Amendment to the U.S. Constitution because it limited free speech too broadly.
- 2014 – A bill banning abortion after twelve weeks that was passed by the Arkansas Senate in 2013 was struck down by federal judge Susan Webber Wright, who described the law as unconstitutional.
- 2014 – The Protection of Life During Pregnancy Act 2013 (Irish: An tAcht um Chosaint na Beatha le linn Toirchis 2013 was signed into law on 30 July by Michael D. Higgins, the President of Ireland; it commenced on 1 January 2014. The Protection of Life During Pregnancy Act 2013 Act No.35 of 2013; previously Bill No.66 of 2013) is an Act of the Oireachtas which defined the circumstances and processes within which abortion in Ireland could be legally performed. The Act gave effect in statutory law to the terms of the Constitution of Ireland as interpreted by the Supreme Court in the 1992 judgment in the X Case. That judgment (see above events in 1992) allowed for abortion where pregnancy endangers a woman's life, including through a risk of suicide.

==== 2015 ====
- 2015 – In 2015, the 7th U.S. Circuit Court of Appeals upheld a decision to strike down the admitting privileges requirement of Wisconsin's Act 37, passed in 2013.
- 2015 – Until 2015, the law in France imposed a seven-day "cool-off" period between the patient's first request for an abortion and a written statement confirming her decision (the delay could be reduced to two days if the patient was getting close to 12 weeks). That mandatory waiting period was abolished on 9 April 2015.
- 2015 – Tennessee established a required 48-hour waiting period before obtaining an abortion.
- 2015 – Kansas became the first state in the United States to ban the dilation and evacuation procedure. The law was later struck down by the Kansas Court of Appeals in January 2016 without ever having gone into effect.
- 2015 – Arizona Governor Jan Brewer signed into law in April 2012 abortion restrictions that prohibited the procedure after 20 weeks. The U.S. Ninth Circuit Court of Appeals overturned this law in January 2015.
- 2015 – California's FACT Act, which mandated that crisis pregnancy centers provide certain disclosures about state services, was passed. The law required that licensed centers post visible notices that other options for pregnancy, including abortion, are available from state-sponsored clinics. It also mandated that unlicensed centers post notice of their unlicensed status. The centers, typically run by Christian non-profit groups, challenged the act on the basis that it violated their free speech. After prior reviews in lower courts, the case was brought to the Supreme Court, asking "Whether the disclosures required by the California Reproductive FACT Act violate the protections set forth in the free speech clause of the First Amendment, applicable to the states through the 14th Amendment." The Court ruled on 26 June 2018, in a 5–4 decision that the notices required by the FACT Act violate the First Amendment by targeting speakers rather than speech.

==== 2016 ====
- 2016 – The FACT Act of New York state made patients aware of state-sponsored services that are available at crisis pregnancy centers, rather than what crisis pregnancy centers did or did not offer. The law went into effect 1 January 2016.
- 2016 – South Carolina Governor Nikki Haley signed legislation that brought into effect a 20-week abortion ban.
- 2016 – Whole Woman's Health v. Hellerstedt, 579 U.S. ___ (2016), was a United States Supreme Court case decided on 27 June 2016, when the Court ruled 5–3 that Texas cannot place restrictions on the delivery of abortion services that create an undue burden for women seeking an abortion. It has been called the most significant abortion rights case before the Supreme Court since Planned Parenthood v. Casey in 1992.
- 2016 – The Obama administration issued guidance informing states that ending Medicaid funding for Planned Parenthood or other healthcare providers that performed abortions might be against federal law. The administration contended that Medicaid law permitted states to ban providers from the program only if the providers could not perform covered services or bill for those services. The Trump administration repealed this guidance in 2018.
- 2016 – Zubik v. Burwell was a case before the United States Supreme Court on whether religious institutions other than churches should be exempt from the contraceptive mandate, a regulation adopted by the US Department of Health and Human Services (HHS) under the Affordable Care Act (ACA) that requires non-church employers to cover certain contraceptives for their female employees. Churches are already exempt under those regulations. On 16 May 2016, the U.S. Supreme Court issued a per curiam ruling in Zubik v. Burwell that vacated the decisions of the Circuit Courts of Appeals and remanded the case "to the respective United States Courts of Appeals for the Third, Fifth, Tenth, and D.C. Circuits" for reconsideration in light of the "positions asserted by the parties in their supplemental briefs". Because the Petitioners agreed that "their religious exercise is not infringed where they 'need to do nothing more than contract for a plan that does not include coverage for some or all forms of contraception'", the Court held that the parties should be given an opportunity to clarify and refine how this approach would work in practice and to "resolve any outstanding issues". The Supreme Court expressed "no view on the merits of the cases." In a concurring opinion, Justice Sotomayor, joined by Justice Ginsburg, noted that in earlier cases "some lower courts have ignored those instructions" and cautioned lower courts not to read any signals in the Supreme Court's actions in this case.
- 2016 – In June, the Women's Rights Foundation in Malta filed a judicial protest requesting access to emergency contraception. In early October, a joint parliamentary committee recommended that oral contraceptives should be sold with a prescription, but that the decision was up to the Malta Medicines Authority. On 17 October, the Malta Medicines Authority approved the sale of emergency contraception without a prescription in all pharmacies in Malta and Gozo, basing its decision to make it available without a prescription on ensuring efficacy of treatment. In December 2016 emergency contraception was available for sale in pharmacies across the Maltese islands.
- 2016 – An Alabama law is passed banning dilation & evacuation (D&E). In August 2018, the Eleventh Circuit ruled the D&E legislation to be unconstitutional, blocking it from being enforced.

==== 2017 ====
- 2017 – A law passed by the Wyoming state legislature went into effect that prohibited the sale of fetal tissue.
- 2017 – A law went into effect in Wyoming that required abortion service providers to give women seeking abortions an ultrasound, but it had no enforcement component.
- 2017 – The "Mexico City Policy", which blocks U.S. federal funding for non-governmental organizations that provide abortion counseling or referrals, was reinstated by President Donald Trump. Trump expanded the policy, making it cover all global health organizations that receive U.S. government funding, rather than only family planning organizations that do, as was previously the case.
- 2017 – In Poland, a law is passed restricting emergency contraception by changing it from an over-the-counter drug to a prescription drug, requiring a visit to a doctor.
- 2017 – The Trump administration of the United States issued a ruling allowing insurers and employers to refuse to provide birth control if doing so went against their "religious beliefs" or "moral convictions".
- 2017 – U.S. Federal judge Wendy Beetlestone issued an injunction temporarily stopping the enforcement of the Trump administration rule allowing insurers and employers to refuse to provide birth control if doing so went against their "religious beliefs" or "moral convictions".
- 2017 – The state legislature updated Delaware's legal code around abortion. It was changed to read, "the termination of a pregnancy prior to viability, to protect the life or health of the mother, or in the event of serious fetal anomaly."
- 2017 – The 100th Illinois General Assembly repealed the trigger law component of the Illinois Abortion Law of 1975, but left many of its other provisions intact. In the same act, the General Assembly provided for abortion to be covered under Medicaid and state employee health insurance. The bill was signed into law by pro-choice Republican governor Bruce Rauner.
- 2017 – The Reproductive Health Equity Act was passed, which required health insurance in Oregon to offer abortion coverage and to absorb most of the costs for the procedure, instead of passing them along to women.

==== 2018 ====
- 2018 – The Arizona state legislature passed a law that required the Arizona Health Department to apply for Title X funds as part of their attempts to defund Planned Parenthood.
- 2018 – An Alabama law is passed banning dilation & evacuation (D&E). In August 2018, the Eleventh Circuit ruled the D&E legislation to be unconstitutional, blocking it from being enforced.
- 2018 – The Trump administration repealed guidance issued in 2016 by the Obama administration, which had informed states that ending Medicaid funding for Planned Parenthood or other healthcare providers that performed abortions might be against federal law. The Obama administration had contended that Medicaid law permitted states to ban providers from the program only if the providers could not perform covered services or bill for those services.
- 2018 – The Eighth Amendment of the Constitution of Ireland, which recognized "the unborn" as having a right to life equal to that of "the mother", was repealed by referendum.
- 2018 – National Institute of Family and Life Advocates v. Becerra was a case before the Supreme Court of the United States addressing the constitutionality of California's FACT Act, which mandated that crisis pregnancy centers provide certain disclosures about state services. The law required that licensed centers post visible notices that other options for pregnancy, including abortion, are available from state-sponsored clinics. It also mandated that unlicensed centers post notice of their unlicensed status. The centers, typically run by Christian non-profit groups, challenged the act on the basis that it violated their free speech. After prior reviews in lower courts, the case was brought to the Supreme Court, asking "Whether the disclosures required by the California Reproductive FACT Act violate the protections set forth in the free speech clause of the First Amendment, applicable to the states through the 14th Amendment." The Court ruled on 26 June 2018, in a 5–4 decision that the notices required by the FACT Act violate the First Amendment by targeting speakers rather than speech.
- 2018 – On 4 May, governor Kim Reynolds signed into law a bill that would ban abortion in Iowa after a fetal heartbeat is detected, starting 1 July 2018.

==== 2019 ====
- 2019 – On 1 January, a law came into force in Arizona that required women to provide detailed medical information that was to be submitted to the state before they were allowed to have an abortion. Among the information the law required abortion providers to collect was whether the abortion was elective or therapeutic, the number of abortions they have had in the past and information on any medical complications they have as a result of the abortion. This information is then collected by the Department of Health Services, which provides the state with an annual report on abortions, along with information on how abortions are paid for.
- 2019 – The Health (Regulation of Termination of Pregnancy) Act 2018 (Act No. 31 of 2018; previously Bill No. 105 of 2018) came into effect; it is an Act of the Oireachtas which defines the circumstances and processes within which abortion may be legally performed in Ireland. It permits terminations to be carried out up to 12 weeks of pregnancy; or where there is a risk to the life, or of serious harm to the health, of the pregnant woman; or where there is a risk to the life, or of serious harm to the health, of the pregnant woman in an emergency; or where there is a condition present which is likely to lead to the death of the fetus either before or within 28 days of birth.
- 2018 – On 4 May, governor Kim Reynolds signed into law a bill that would ban abortion in Iowa after a fetal heartbeat is detected, starting 1 July 2018. On 22 January 2019, a county district judge declared the law to be in violation of Iowa's State Constitution and entered a permanent injunction prohibiting its enforcement.
- 2019 – The government of South Korea criminalized abortion in the 1953 Criminal Code in all circumstances. This law was later amended, but not repealed. However, the Constitutional Court on 11 April 2019 ruled the abortion law unconstitutional and ordered the law's revision by the end of 2020.
- 2019 – New York state passed the Reproductive Health Act (RHA), which repealed a pre-Roe v. Wade provision that banned third-trimester abortions except in cases where the continuation of the pregnancy endangered a pregnant woman's life. The law said: "The legislature finds that comprehensive reproductive health care, including contraception and abortion, is a fundamental component of a woman's health, privacy, and equality." The bill also allowed qualified health practitioners to perform abortions, not just licensed medical doctors.
- 2019 – Box v. Planned Parenthood of Indiana and Kentucky, Inc. (Docket 18-483) was a United States Supreme Court case dealing with the constitutionality of a 2016 anti-abortion law passed in the state of Indiana. Indiana's law sought to ban abortions performed solely on the basis of the fetus' gender, race, ethnicity, or disabilities. Lower courts had blocked enforcement of the law for violating a woman's right to abortion under privacy concerns within the Fourteenth Amendment, as previously found in the landmark cases Roe v. Wade and Planned Parenthood v. Casey. The lower courts also blocked enforcement of another portion of the law that required the disposal of aborted fetuses through burial or cremation. The per curiam decision by the Supreme Court overturned the injunction on the fetal disposal portion of the law, but otherwise did not challenge or confirm the lower courts' ruling on the non-discrimination clauses, leaving these in place.
- 2019 – In the United States in June, the Trump administration was allowed by a federal court of appeals to implement, while legal appeals continue, a policy restricting taxpayer dollars given to family planning facilities through Title X. This policy requires that companies receiving Title X funding must not mention abortion to patients, provide abortion referrals, or share space with abortion providers.
- 2019 – A federal judge in the United States declared unconstitutional the Trump administration's "conscience rule" that would have allowed providers of health care to refuse to participate in sterilizations, abortions, or other types of care they disagreed with on moral or religious grounds.
- 2019 – The newly elected government in Argentina issued a protocol expanding access to abortion to include cases of rape.
- 2019 – The California State Senate passed Senate Bill 24, the College Student Right to Access Act. The Act requires public state universities to offer mifepristone, the abortion pill, to female students at zero cost by 1 January 2023; funding for the program will be paid for through insurance and private grants with $200,000 to each University of California and California State University health clinic for training and equipment. University clinics also have to set aside an additional $200,000 each to set up a student hotline to provide information to women seeking advice and assistance. The bill was approved by both the California State Assembly and California State Senate as amended on 13 September 2019, was enacted by Governor Gavin Newsom on 11 October 2019, and went into effect on 1 January 2020.
- 2019 – Illinois passed bills, known as the Illinois Reproductive Health Act, that provided statutory protections for abortions, and rescinded previous legislation that banned some late-term abortions and a 45-year-old law that had made performing such abortions a criminal offense. The Illinois Reproductive Health Act says that women have the "fundamental right" to access abortion services, and that a "fertilized egg, embryo, or fetus does not have independent rights".
- 2019 – The Indiana Legislature passed a ban on the most common type of second-trimester abortion procedure in the state in April.
- 2019 – In April, the Kansas Supreme Court ruled that the right to abortion is inherent within the state's constitution and bill of rights, such that even if Roe v. Wade was overturned and the federal protection of abortion rights was withdrawn, the right would still be allowed within Kansas, barring a change in the state constitution.
- 2019 – Prior to 2019, Kentucky law prohibited abortions after week 22. This changed when the state legislature passed a law that moved the prohibition to week 6 in the early part of the year.
- 2019 – An early pregnancy abortion bill was signed into law by Mississippi Governor Phil Bryant.
- 2019 – The Trust Nevada Women Act, SB 179, was signed into law by Democratic Governor Steve Sisolak. The new law made several changes to existing abortion laws in the state of Nevada, including decriminalizing the performing of abortion procedures, and removing informed consent laws that said doctors needed to tell women of the "emotional implications" of having an abortion and what women should do after the procedure to avoid post-op complications; the latter was changed to require doctors to "describe the nature and consequences of the procedure" of abortion to women getting abortions. The law also meant doctors no longer had to collect data about women getting abortions related to their marital status and age.
- 2019 – U.S. District Judge William Osteen formally struck down North Carolina's 'life of the mother only' 20-week abortion ban in 2019. His judgement pushed the date of which abortions could be performed to the date of viability, which is later for many women.
- 2019 – The Reproductive Privacy Act banned Rhode Island from restricting "an individual person from preventing, commencing, continuing, or terminating that individual's pregnancy prior to fetal viability" or after fetal viability "to preserve the health or life" of the pregnant individual. It also forbade state restrictions on contraceptives in Rhode Island, repealed bans on partial-birth abortions in Rhode Island, forbade medical professionals from being charged with felony assault for performing abortions in Rhode Island, and repealed requirements for abortion providers to notify a husband before giving his wife an abortion in Rhode Island.
- 2019 – Ohio Governor Mike DeWine signed the Human Rights and Heartbeat Protection Act, which bans abortion in the state after a fetal heartbeat is detectable. On 24 June 2022, after the Supreme Court of the United States overturned Roe v. Wade, judge Michael R. Barrett lifted a preliminary injunction that had blocked state officials from enforcing the law against certain abortion providers, allowing the Human Rights and Heartbeat Protection Act to take full effect.
- 2019 – The Utah legislature passed a bill limiting abortions after 18 weeks of pregnancy.

=== 2020s ===
==== 2020 ====
- 2020 – Democratic Virginia Governor Ralph Northam signed bills removing regulations that had required abortion seekers to have an ultrasound at least 24 hours before receiving an abortion and to get counseling on alternatives to abortion, removing the requirement that facilities providing more than five abortions each year be designated as hospitals, and allowing nurse practitioners to perform first trimester abortions.
- 2020 – In March 2020, Oklahoma Governor Kevin Stitt signed an executive order to limit elective medical procedures, later confirming that all types of abortion services were included, except for those necessary in a medical emergency or to "prevent serious health risks" to the pregnant woman. However, on 6 April, federal judge Charles Barnes Goodwin blocked the executive order, ruling that the state acted in an arbitrary, unreasonable, and oppressive way, which posed an undue burden on abortion access in Oklahoma.
- 2020 – On 24 March 2020, Governor Brad Little of Idaho signed into law S1385, which is a trigger law stating that if and when states are again allowed to ban abortion on their own authority then abortion would be illegal in Idaho except for cases of the life of the mother, rape or incest.
- 2020 – After the passage of the ROE Act in 2020, which codified abortion rights in the state of Massachusetts, abortions can be performed after 24 weeks in cases of fetal anomalies and risks to a patient's mental or physical health. The ROE Act also lowered the age patients can have abortions without parental consent from 18 to 16.
- 2020 – June Medical Services, LLC v. Russo (formerly June Medical Services, LLC v. Gee) (591 U.S. ___ (2020)) was a U.S. Supreme Court case which ruled that a Louisiana state law placing hospital-admission requirements on abortion clinics doctors, which had mirrored a Texas state law previously found unconstitutional under Whole Woman's Health v. Hellerstedt (579 U.S. ___ (2016)) (WWH), was also unconstitutional.
- 2020 – A law was enacted in Mississippi banning abortions based on the sex, race, or genetic abnormality of the fetus.
- 2020 – The Patient Protection and Affordable Care Act of the United States tried to require employers to offer health-insurance plans that paid for contraceptives. The law specifically exempted churches, but not faith-based ministries. Due to that, religious non-profits like Little Sisters of the Poor were fined if they did not comply. On 6 October 2017, Health & Human Services issued a new rule with an updated religious exemption that protected religious non-profits. But federal judge Wendy Beetlestone issued an injunction temporarily stopping the enforcement of that exemption. As well, following the new rule announcement, the state of Pennsylvania sued the federal government to take away the exemption. Pennsylvania asked a judge to order that the Little Sisters of the Poor must comply with the federal mandate or pay tens of millions of dollars in fines. The state alleged that the religious organization violated the Constitution, federal anti-discrimination law, and the Administrative Procedure Act (APA). On 8 July 2020, in Little Sisters of the Poor v. Pennsylvania, the U.S. Supreme Court ruled against that and in favor of Little Sisters of the Poor.
- 2020 – Poland's constitutional court ruled that abortion due to fetal defects was unconstitutional.
- 2020 – Louisiana voters passed a measure to amend the state constitution to omit any language implying that a woman has a right to get an abortion or that any abortion that does occur should be funded.
- 2020 – Tennessee banned abortions because of a prenatal diagnosis of Down syndrome or because of the gender or race of the fetus.
- 2020 – In Argentina, abortion was legalized up to fourteen weeks of pregnancy on 30 December 2020.
- 2020 – A bill was signed into law in Ohio requiring all aborted fetal tissue to be cremated or buried.

==== 2021 ====
- 2021 – In January 2021, New Jersey governor Phil Murphy signed the Freedom of Reproductive Choice Act into law, preserving the legal right to obtain an abortion, fulfilling a reelection campaign promise.
- 2021 – A law went into effect in Indiana mandating an ultrasound 18 hours or more before an abortion is performed.
- 2021 – The Supreme Court of the United States reinstated federal rules mandating anyone having a medication abortion to acquire the pills for it from a medical provider in person.
- 2021 – President Biden rescinded the Mexico City policy.
- 2021 – Honduras added its abortion ban to its constitution, and set the number of votes required in order to change it at three-quarters of Congress.
- 2021 – In 2021 the city of Lebanon, Ohio, passed an ordinance whereby abortion at all stages of pregnancy was outlawed.
- 2021 – Mason, Ohio banned abortion at all stages in 2021, but its ordinance doing so was repealed later that year.
- 2021 – In February 2021, South Carolina passed a law which would outlaw almost all abortions in that state after a fetal heartbeat is detected; however, that law was blocked by a judge in March 2021.
- 2021 – In fall 2021, the Illinois General Assembly passed a bill to repeal the Parental Notice of Abortion Act. Governor Pritzker signed it into law on 17 December 2021.
- 2021 – South Dakota Governor Kristi Noem signed an executive order requiring in-person medical visits—not merely telehealth appointments—for the prescription of medication abortions.

==== 2022 ====
- 2022 – On 1 January 2022, a bill passed that required patients receiving abortion care at a health center in New Hampshire to have an ultrasound.
- 2022 – In February 2022, Colombia's highest court decriminalizes abortion in the first 24 weeks of the pregnancy.
- 2022 – In April 2022, Colorado passed the Reproductive Health Equity Act, which guarantees access to reproductive care and affirms the rights of pregnant women to continue or terminate a pregnancy. The act prohibits public entities from restricting or denying those rights.
- 2022 – On 14 April 2022, House Bill 3 was passed in Kentucky; it banned all abortions in the state after 15 weeks post-conception and introduced a number of regulations and restrictions, including a prohibition on mailing abortion pills, new systems to certify, monitor and publicly name physicians who conduct abortion procedures, "dignified care for the terminated remains of pregnancy loss," and mandatory disclosure of patient information. As the infrastructure was not in place for these new requirements, the two abortion clinics operating in Kentucky had to shut down, making abortion de facto illegal in the state. In response, abortion-rights activists sued the state to challenge the law, with Planned Parenthood and the ACLU stating that the law unconstitutionally bans abortion by introducing requirements that can't be followed or are too arduous to comply with and that it violates patient privacy protections; this led to the law being blocked in federal court later in 2022.
- 2022 – On 17 June 2022, the Iowa Supreme Court ruled that the state constitution does not protect the right to an abortion. Justice Edward Mansfield wrote in the majority that "All we hold today is that the Iowa Constitution is not the source of a fundamental right to an abortion necessitating a strict scrutiny standard of review for regulations affecting that right". The court's decision is a reversal of its 2018 ruling, where it found that the constitution protects the right to an abortion.
- 2022 – Dobbs v. Jackson Women's Health Organization, No. 19-1392, 597 U.S. ___ (2022), is a decision of the United States Supreme Court, in which the Court held that the Constitution of the United States does not confer any right to abortion, thus overruling both Roe v. Wade (1973) and Planned Parenthood v. Casey (1992).
- 2022 – The 2019 trigger law in Kentucky took effect after the ruling for Dobbs v. Jackson Women's Health Organization was delivered, which overturned Roe v. Wade. It made all abortions illegal in Kentucky except when medically mandatory to prevent the patient from dying or getting a "life-sustaining organ" permanently impaired. Both clinics in the state temporarily stopped providing abortions.
- 2022 – Jefferson County Circuit Judge Mitch Perry issued a temporary restraining order blocking enforcement of Kentucky's abortion-banning trigger law pending further hearings to determine if the ban violates the Kentucky Constitution. This order temporarily allows both of Kentucky's elective abortion providers, which are both located in Louisville, to temporarily resume elective abortions.
- 2022 – President Joe Biden signed Executive Order 14076, which directs the Department of Health and Human Services to expand access to contraceptives, requests the Federal Trade Commission protect patients' reproductive health privacy, and directs the Department of Justice to organize a group of pro bono lawyers to defend women charged with having an abortion.
- 2022 – The Biden administration issued guidance stating that due to federal law, pharmacies are not allowed to turn away people who have a prescription for a drug that might end a pregnancy.
- 2022 – New regulations went into effect in Israel stating that those seeking abortions could send their requests online and would no longer be asked about their use of birth control. As well, under the new regulations they no longer have to meet with a social worker and may obtain a medication abortion (if medically possible) under the oversight of a community health clinic, rather than having to go to hospitals to receive the medication as they did previously.
- 2022 – In 2022, a legislative committee passed to the House floor in Louisiana a proposed law that would have potentially criminalized abortion seekers, as well as abortion providers, which was met with vehement opposition by both pro- and anti-abortion advocates and ultimately amended by the full House to remove criminal sanctions for abortion seekers, passed into law and signed by Governor John Bel Edwards (D).
- 2022 – The Abortion Care Access Act was enacted in Maryland; it allows a broader range of healthcare workers — nurse practitioners, nurse midwives, and physician assistants – to perform abortions and allocates $3.5 million to a new program within the Maryland Department of Health to train healthcare workers. Additionally, it requires the majority of health insurance plans, including private health insurance plans, to cover abortions cost free.
- 2022 – Oklahoma's abortion ban took effect on 25 May 2022, when Governor Kevin Stitt signed HB 4327 into law, and abortion providers ceased offering services in Oklahoma as of that date. HB 4327 is modeled after the Texas Heartbeat Act and is enforced solely through civil lawsuits brought by private citizens, making it exceedingly difficult for abortion providers to challenge the constitutionality of the statute in court. Oklahoma thus became the first state to ban abortion from the moment of fertilization since Roe v. Wade.
- 2022 – Wisconsin banned abortion immediately after the 2022 Supreme Court decision Dobbs v. Jackson Women's Health Organization overturning Roe v Wade, per a state law that automatically caused abortion to be banned if Roe v Wade was repealed.
- 2022 – On 24 June 2022, following the United States Supreme Court's ruling in Dobbs v. Jackson Women's Health Organization, Missouri Attorney General Eric Schmitt signed a proclamation bringing into effect the state's "trigger law", banning all non-medically necessary abortions.
- 2022 – According to HB136, which is effective Utah state law from 28 June 2022, abortions are banned following 18 weeks of gestation.
- 2022 – A law outlawing abortion in Mississippi took effect on 7 July 2022, after Mississippi State Attorney General Lynn Fitch on 27 June of that year certified the 24 June 2022 Supreme Court decision on Dobbs v. Jackson Women's Health Organization.
- 2022 – Due to the trigger law prohibiting abortion from the point of fertilization which was adopted on 22 April 2019, abortion became illegal from the point of conception in Tennessee on 25 July 2022, 30 days after the overturning of Roe v. Wade.
- 2022 – Wyoming's legislature passed HB92 in the 2022 legislative session, a trigger law meant to ban abortion soon after the overturn of Roe v. Wade except for cases of rape, incest (reported to law enforcement) and serious risk of death or "substantial and irreversible physical impairments" for the pregnant woman. However, this law was blocked by 9th District Court Judge Melissa Owens the day it took effect (27 July 2022).
- 2022 – Abortion in North Dakota has been mostly illegal since 28 July 2022 when the state's trigger law, following the United States' Supreme Court ruling to overturn Roe v. Wade on 24 June 2022, went into effect. The trigger law bans all abortions except to save the life of the mother or in the case of rape or incest, reported to law enforcement.
- 2022 – A three-judge bench of the Supreme Court of India in Civil Appeal No. 5802 of 2022 made a ruling on 29 September 2022. The ruling defined "woman" as all persons who require access to safe abortion, along with cisgender women, thus including transpersons and other gender-diverse persons as well as cisgender women. The Court remarked that medical practitioners should refrain from imposing extra-legal conditions on those seeking abortion, such as obtaining the consent of the abortion seeker's family, producing documentary proofs, or judicial authorization, and that only the abortion seeker's consent was material, unless she was a minor or mentally ill. It also stated that "every pregnant woman has the intrinsic right to choose to undergo or not to undergo abortion without any consent or authorization from a third party" and that a woman is the only and "ultimate decision-maker on the question of whether she wants to undergo an abortion." On the topic of the difference between the gestation period considered legal for married and unmarried women—24 weeks for the former and 20 weeks for the latter—the Court ruled that the distinction was discriminatory, artificial, unsustainable and in violation of Article 14 of the Constitution of India, and that "all women are entitled to the benefit of safe and legal abortion." On the subject of pregnancies resulting from marital rape, the Court ruled that women can seek an abortion in the term of 20 to 24 weeks under the ambit of "survivors of sexual assault or rape".
- 2022 – In the city of Hobbs, New Mexico, a local ordinance was passed in November 2022 to prevent abortion clinics from operating.
- 2022 - A 1931 law criminalized abortion in Michigan except when the mother's life was in danger, and the U.S. Supreme Court ruling in Dobbs v. Jackson Women's Health Organization would have allowed that law to go back into effect, but on 7 September 2022, a Michigan Court of Claims judge ruled that that law violated the Michigan constitution.
- 2022 - Voters overwhelmingly passed Proposal 5, the Reproductive Liberty Amendment, making Vermont one of the first three states, along with California and Michigan, to amend their constitutions to explicitly include protections for abortion rights.
- 2022 - California voters overwhelmingly passed Proposition 1, which amended the Constitution of California to explicitly protect the right to abortion.
- 2022 - 2022 Michigan Proposal 3 was a ballot proposal that amended the Michigan Constitution to include the right to reproductive freedom, which the measure defined as "the right to make and effectuate decisions about all matters relating to pregnancy, including but not limited to prenatal care, childbirth, postpartum care, contraception, sterilization, abortion care, miscarriage management and infertility care."

==== 2023 ====
- In January 2023, the Minnesota Legislature passed the Protecting Reproductive Options Act to "explicitly protect and codify abortion rights" within Minnesota law. The Governor of Minnesota signed the bill on 31 January 2023.
- 2023 - After the Supreme Court overturned Roe v. Wade in 2022, it was unclear whether Michigan's 1931 statute criminalizing abortion procedures and drugs was operative. In April 2023, Governor Gretchen Whitmer signed a bill repealing the 1931 ban, ensuring abortion access in Michigan.

==== 2024 ====
- 2024 - FDA v. Alliance for Hippocratic Medicine, 602 U.S. 367 (2024), was a United States Supreme Court case to challenge the U.S. Food and Drug Administration (FDA)'s approval of mifepristone, a drug frequently used in medical abortion procedures. The Supreme Court of the United States ruled unanimously on 13 June 2024, that the Alliance for Hippocratic Medicine (AHM) did not have association standing under Article III to bring a case, since neither AHM nor the groups it represented had shown injury. The decision reversed the lower court decisions, restoring mifepristone's availability under current FDA rules.
- 2024 - Moyle v. United States, 603 U.S. ___ (2024), was a United States Supreme Court case about whether an Idaho abortion law conflicted with the federal Emergency Medical Treatment and Labor Act (EMTALA). The court initially agreed to expedite the appeal and temporarily allowed Idaho to enforce its abortion ban. After hearing the case, the court dismissed it as improvidently granted and restored a lower court order allowing emergency abortions under EMTALA. This returned the case to the lower courts without a ruling on the merits.
- 2024 - Abortion was legalized for up to 14 weeks of pregnancy in Indonesia in cases of medical emergency and rape.
- 2024 - Arizona’s abortion ban was repealed through legislation passed by Democratic lawmakers and five Republican lawmakers in the Arizona state legislature, and signed by Arizona Governor Katie Hobbs on 2 May 2024. This repeal of the abortion ban took effect 90 days after the legislative session ended, on 14 September 2024.

== See also ==
- Abortion law
- Birth control movement in the United States
- List of sex-related court cases in the United States
- The Eastview Birth Control Trial
