= Burton v. Florida =

- Court: Florida District Court of Appeals
- Full case name: Samantha Burton, Appellant, v. State of Florida, Appellee.
- Decided: August 12, 2010
- Citation: 49 So.3d 263

Case history
- Appealed from: Leon County Circuit Court

Court membership
- Judges sitting: William Van Nortwick Jr., Nikki Ann Clark, Wendy Berger

Case opinions
- Decision by: Clark
- Concurrence: Van Nortwick
- Dissent: Berger

Keywords
- Reproductive rights; Rights of pregnant patients

Burton v. Florida, 49 So.3d 263 (2010), was a Florida District Court of Appeals case ruling that the court cannot impose unwanted treatment on a pregnant woman "in the best interests of the fetus" without providing evidence of fetal viability.

== Facts of the case ==
Samantha Burton, a mother of two, was twenty-five weeks pregnant in March 2009 when she experienced a premature rupture of membranes and displayed signs of premature labor. At the urging of her obstetrician, she sought care at Tallahassee Memorial Hospital. She was found not to be in labor, but ordered to remain on bed rest. Burton refused, as she was concerned about being away from her children for three months.

Her obstetrician, Dr. Jana Bures-Forsthoefel, refused to allow her to leave the hospital to garner a second opinion and then obtained a court order from the Circuit Court of Leon County which required Burton to undergo "any and all medical treatments" that her physician, acting in the interests of the fetus, deemed necessary. The Court held the hearing by telephone with Burton being required to argue her case from her hospital bed without the assistance of an attorney or independent medical opinion. Three days into her court-ordered confinement, Burton underwent an emergency C-section, at which time the fetus was found to be dead.

David H. Abrams, a nurse attorney, appealed the Leon County Circuit Court ruling and the Florida chapter of the American Civil Liberties Union joined as amicus. The ACLU and the ACLU of Florida filed a friend-of-the-court brief against the state of Florida, opposing the Court's decision to force a pregnant woman to remain hospitalized against her will and prohibiting her from getting a second opinion.

State Attorney Willie Meggs, who appointed counsel for Tallahassee Memorial Hospital as a special prosecutor to represent the State at the trial court level, justified the intervention by stating: "When it involves an unborn child we become the representative of the child when nobody else will represent it."

== Ruling of the court ==
On August 12, 2010, the Florida Circuit Court of Appeals for the First Circuit issued its ruling, written by Nikki Clark, in favor of Burton and against the State. The Court rejected the State of Florida's argument that the best interest of the child standard applied. The Court ruled that Ms. Burton had fundamental rights to privacy and liberty under the Florida Constitution and that those rights were subject to strict scrutiny review. While the Court did not hold that the State could never intervene in a woman's pregnancy it limited such intervention to instances where fetal viability was proven by the state and rejected the argument that viability is set by gestational age of the fetus. The Court further held that once the State had proven viability it must then show that the proposed intervention is the least intrusive and least restrictive means possible of protecting the State's interest in the fetus.

== See also ==
- In re A.C., 1990 D.C. Court of Appeals case
