= Lucy Memorial Hospital =

Hospital in Accra, Ghana

Coordinates: 5.6452°N 0.2768°W

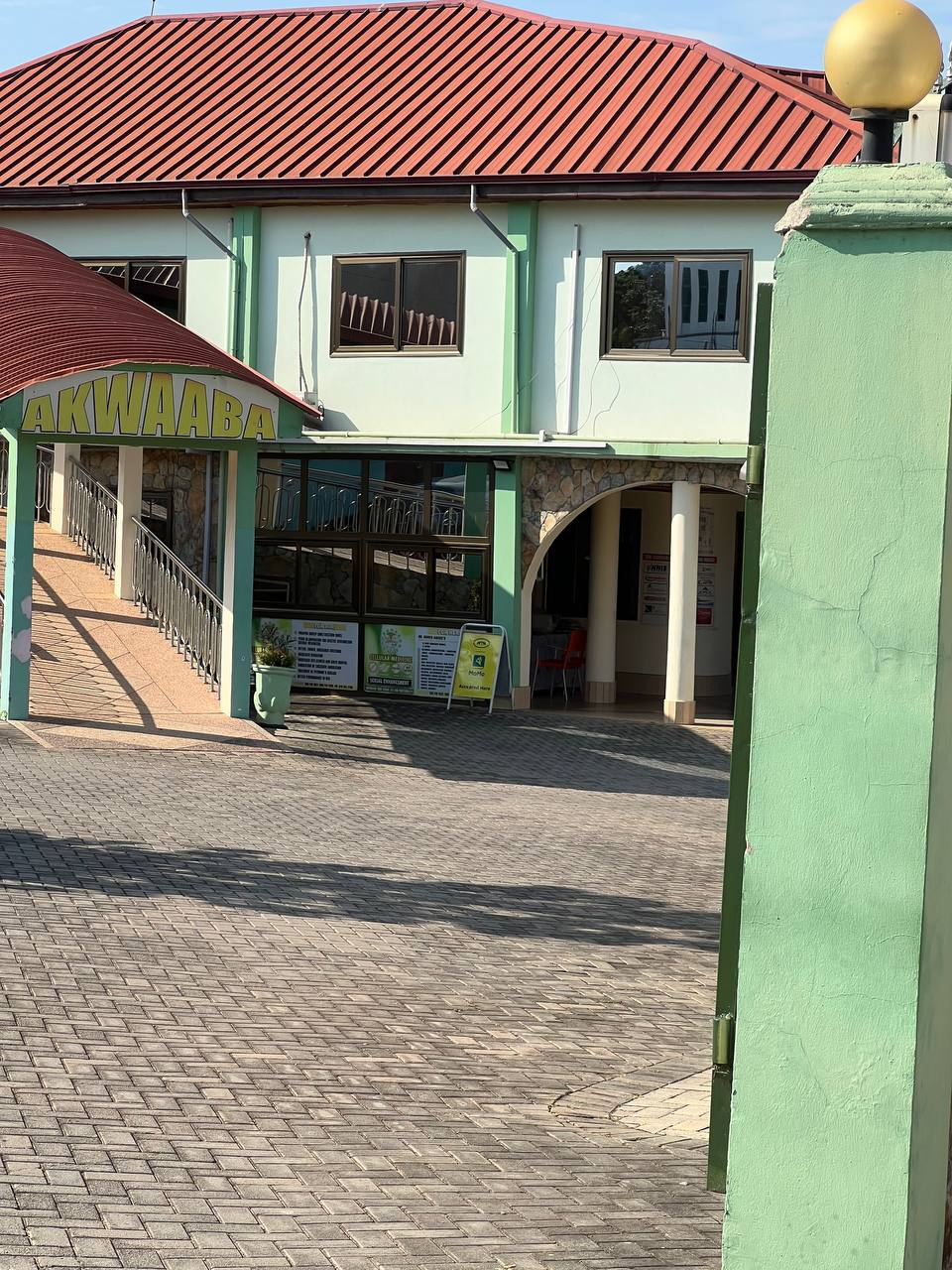

Geography
- Location: West Africa, Ghana

Organisation
- Type: Specialist
- Religious affiliation: Private

Services
- Beds: 100

Links
- Lists: Hospitals in Ghana

Lucy Memorial Hospital is a private hospital located in South Ofankor Accra Ghana.

== Services ==
- Out patient, surgical centre
- Gynaecology
- Antenatal post natal and delivery
- Ultra sound scanning, X-ray
- ECG
- Laboratory
- physiotherapy massage
- Endoscopy
- 24hr ambulance services,
- Cancer screening
- Pediatric Clinic
- Cellular and aesthetic clinic.
- X Ray

=== Specialist ===
Surgical centre

== CMD ==
The CMD of Lucy memorial hospital is Dr. Davies Kofie.

== Insurance accepted ==
AHI Accasia Health Insurance Ghana
