= TOLAC =

Attempt at labor and delivery to see whether it results in VBAC

Trial of labor after caesarean (TOLAC) is the term for an attempted birth in a patient who has had a previous caesarean section. It may result in a successful VBAC (vaginal birth after caesarean) or a repeat caesarean section. In approximately 20–40% of TOLACs, a caesarean is performed. TOLAC is recommended when a patient has had one previous caesarean section using a low transverse uterine incision. The main risks of TOLAC are emergency caesarean section and uterine rupture.
