= Rudimentary horn pregnancy =

Medical condition

Pregnancy in a rudimentary horn of the uterus is a very rare type of ectopic pregnancy. This type of pregnancy can be life-threatening, as the rudimentary horn is not meant to sustain a pregnancy and is at risk of rupturing.

Unicornuate uterus with rudimentary horn is a type of congenital uterine anomaly that arises when one of the Müllerian ducts fails to develop fully, resulting in a small rudimentary horn on one side of the uterus. Different terms have been used in the literature to describe the rudimentary horn, such as uterus bicornis with accessory horn, uterus bicornis unicollis with rudimentary horn, uterus bicornis unicollis with atretic horn, hernia uterus inguinale, and Robert's uterus.

== Complications ==
This condition is considered a medical emergency, as rupture of the rudimentary horn can occur in the late first or second trimester of pregnancy (between 10 and 15 weeks of gestation), leading to massive bleeding and threatening the patient's life. Pregnancy in a rudimentary horn is typically associated with several complications, including intrauterine growth restriction, low amniotic fluid levels, preterm birth, fetal death, and occasionally, full-term gestation. While there have been cases of successful live births, the prognosis for pregnancy in the rudimentary horn is generally poor.

== Epidemiology ==
It is reported that 1 out of every 200 to 600 fertile women have a congenital uterine anomaly, while the occurrence of unicornuate uterus with rudimentary horn is even less common, with a frequency of 1 in 100,000. Although pregnancy in the rudimentary horn is extremely rare, it can lead to an ectopic gestation with an incidence of 1 in 100,000 to 1 in 140,000 pregnancies.

== Diagnosis ==
Diagnosing rudimentary horn pregnancy requires specific tests, such as hysteroscopy, hysterosalpingography, and laparoscopy, and close monitoring is essential if a person with a suspected rudimentary horn becomes pregnant to avoid the risk of rupture and its complications. Recent progress in diagnostic imaging techniques, including magnetic resonance imaging and ultrasound, have enabled the detection of these pregnancies before they lead to rupture. Obstetric ultrasonography, particularly the transvaginal method, is used for attempting prenatal diagnosis.

Many patients experience acute abdominal pain, and it can be challenging to differentiate rudimentary horn pregnancy from other acute abdominal or gestational problems through ultrasound, leading to a high rate of misdiagnosis. Additionally, during advanced stages of gestation, rudimentary horn pregnancy can closely resemble abdominal pregnancy.

== Management ==
The standard approach for managing a rudimentary horn, regardless of the trimester, is to remove it along with the corresponding tube using either laparoscopy or laparotomy. This is advised because the functional endometrial horn has a higher risk of ectopic pregnancy, infertility, and dysmenorrhoea.
