= RHP =

RHP may refer to:

- RHP (film), Fujichrome 400 D Professional and Fujichrome Provia, a series of professional Fujifilm color reversal films with a film speed of ISO 400
- 1st Parachute Hussar Regiment (French: 1er Régiment de Hussards Parachutistes or 1er RHP), an airborne cavalry unit in the French army
- Red House Painters, an American alternative rock group
- Resource holding potential (or power), a measure of an animal's fighting ability
- Riemann–Hilbert problems in mathematics
- Right-handed pitcher, in baseball
- Right-hand path, a term used in Western esotericism
- Right-half-plane, a concept in the Nyquist criterion used in designing feedback control systems
- Rio Hondo Preparatory School, in Arcadia, California
- Rödelheim Hartreim Projekt, a German rap group
- Rogers Home Phone, a subsidiary of Rogers Communications
- Rudimentary horn pregnancy
