= Delivery after previous caesarean section =

Birth following a cesarean section

Vaginal birth after caesarean
- MeSH: D016064

In case of a previous caesarean section, a subsequent pregnancy can be planned to be delivered by either of the following two main methods:

- Vaginal birth after caesarean section (VBAC)
- Elective repeat caesarean section (ERCS)

Both have higher risks than a vaginal birth with no previous caesarean section. There are many issues which affect the decision for planned vaginal or planned abdominal delivery. There is a slightly higher risk for uterine rupture and perinatal death of the child with VBAC than ERCS, but the absolute increased risk of these complications is small, especially with only one previous low transverse caesarean section. A large majority of women planning VBAC will achieve a successful vaginal delivery, although there are more risks to the mother and baby from an unplanned caesarean section than from an ERCS. Successful VBAC also reduces the risk of complications in future pregnancies more than ERCS.

In 2010, the National Institutes of Health, U.S. Department of Health and Human Services, and American College of Obstetricians and Gynecologists all released statements in support of increasing VBAC access and rates. Recently, it is recognized that as the number of cesarean sections a patient undergoes increases, so does the risk of significant obstetrical complications. It is still suggested to try VBAC over ERCS even with its slightly higher risk of uterine rupture.

TOLAC (trial of labor after caesarean) is an attempt at vaginal delivery to see whether it can succeed in resulting in a VBAC. If it turns out not to progress acceptably, then a caesarean is performed.

== Technique ==
Where the woman is labouring with a previous section scar (i.e. a planned VBAC in labour), depending on the provider, special precautions may be recommended. These include intravenous access (a cannula into the vein) and continuous fetal monitoring (cardiotocography or CTG monitoring of the fetal heart rate with transducers on the mother's abdomen). Most women in the UK should be counselled to avoid induction of labour if there are no medical reasons for it, as the risks of uterine rupture of the previous scar are increased if the labour is induced. Other intrapartum management options, including analgesia/anesthesia, are identical to those of any labour and vaginal delivery.

For ERCS, the choice of skin incision should be determined by what seems to be most beneficial for the present operation, regardless of the choice of the previous location as seen by its scar, although the vast majority of surgeons will incise through the previous scar to optimise the cosmetic result. Hypertrophic (very thick or unsightly) scars are best excised because it gives a better cosmetic result and is associated with improved wound healing. On the other hand, keloid scars should have their margins left without any incision because of risk of tissue reaction in the subsequent scar.

== Selection criteria ==
The choice of VBAC or ERCS depends on many issues: medical and obstetric indications, maternal choice and availability of provider and birth setting (hospital, birthing center, or home). Some commonly employed criteria include:

=== Factors favoring VBAC ===
- If the previous caesarean(s) involved a low transverse incision there is less risk of uterine rupture than if there was a low vertical incision, classical incision, T-shaped, inverted T-shaped, or J-shaped incision.
- A previous successful vaginal delivery (before or after the caesarean section) increases the chances of a successful VBAC.
- The indication for the previous caesarean section should not be present in the current pregnancy.
- The prior cesarean was due to a non-recurring condition such as breech presentation.
- Location at an institution equipped to respond to emergencies with physicians immediately available to provide emergency care.

=== Factors favoring ERCS ===
- The more caesarean sections that a woman has had, the less likely she will be eligible for VBAC. VBAC after two or more prior lower uterine segment transverse CS is controversial. The Royal College of Obstetricians and Gynaecologists recommends that women with a prior history of even two previous uncomplicated low transverse Caesarean sections, in an otherwise uncomplicated pregnancy at term, with no contraindication for vaginal birth, may be considered suitable for planned VBAC.
- The presence of twins may reduce the chance of successful VBAC, but if the leading twin is head first (cephalic presentation) and there are no other reasons to recommend caesarean section, VBAC should be offered.
- The prior cesarean was due to a condition likely to recur such as arrest of labor.
- VBAC may be discouraged if there are other medical complications but this will require an individualised assessment and discussion between the woman and her obstetrician.
- There is less likelihood of achieving successful VBAC if any of the following factors are presents: labor induction or augmentation, advanced maternal age, high body mass index, high birth weight, gestational age greater than 40 weeks, short interdelivery interval (less than 19 months), and preeclampsia.

According to ACOG guidelines, the following criteria may reduce the likelihood of VBAC success but should NOT preclude a trial of labour: having two prior caesarean sections, suspected fetal macrosomia at term (fetus greater than 4000-4500 grams in weight), gestation beyond 40 weeks, twin gestation, and previous low vertical or unknown previous incision type, provided a classical uterine incision is not suspected.

=== Criteria where ERCS should be performed ===
The presence of any of the following practically always mean that ERCS will be performed – but this decision should always be discussed with a senior obstetrician:

- Maternal request for elective repeat CS after counselling
- Maternal or fetal reasons to avoid vaginal birth in current pregnancy
- Previous uterine incision other than transverse segment including classical (longitudinal). The Royal College of Obstetricians and Gynaecologists recommends that women with a prior history of one classical (longitudinal) caesarean section should give birth by elective repeat caesarean section (ERCS).
- Unknown previous uterine incision
- Previous uterine rupture. For women with a history of prior uterine rupture, ERCS should be performed before the onset of spontaneous labor. A planned cesarean is generally recommended between 36 weeks and 37 weeks of gestation for these patients according to updated guidance by ACOG in 2019.
- Previous hysterotomy or myomectomy where the uterine cavity was breached

== Outcomes in VBAC versus ERCS ==
VBAC and ERCS differ in outcomes on many end-points.

The American College of Obstetricians and Gynecologists (ACOG) states that VBAC is associated with decreased maternal morbidity and a decreased risk of complications in future pregnancies than ERCS. However, an unplanned cesarean section following a TOLAC is associated with increased complications compared to both ERCS and successful VBAC.

According to the American College of Obstetricians and Gynecologists (ACOG), it is most appropriate to compare the clinical and statistical risks for elective repeat cesarean section (ERCS) with trial of labor after cesarean (TOLAC) given that a successful vaginal birth after cesarean (VBAC) is never guaranteed and complications are primarily associated with failed TOLAC.

=== Uterine rupture ===
A caesarean section leaves a scar in the wall of the uterus which is considered weaker than the normal uterine wall. A VBAC carries a risk of uterine rupture of 22–74/10,000. Slightly lower risk of uterine rupture in women undergoing ERCS (i.e. a section before the onset of labour). Mothers with a previous lower uterine segment cesarean are considered the best candidates for VBAC, as that region of the uterus is under less physical stress during labor and delivery. Although there is higher risk of uterine rupture in VBAC than ERCS, both rates happen to be very low. Sometimes no significant difference in uterine rupture rates is found between the groups of VBAC and ERCS. If a uterine rupture does occur, the risk of perinatal death is approximately 6%. Even if it happens, most birthing parents and babies will recover completely after uterine rupture.

=== Risks to the child ===
A VBAC carries a 2–3/10,000 additional risk of birth-related perinatal death when compared with ERCS. The absolute risk of such birth-related perinatal loss is comparable to the risk for women having their first birth. Planned VBAC carries an 8/10,000 risk of the child developing hypoxic ischaemic encephalopathy, but the long-term outcome of the infant with HIE is unknown and related to many factors.

On the other hand, attempting VBAC reduces the risk that the child will have respiratory problems after birth such as infant respiratory distress syndrome (IRDS), as rates are estimated at 2–3% with planned VBAC and 3–4% with ERCS.

=== Conversion from planned VBAC to Caesarean ===
For women who have previously had a Caesarean, VBAC rates have ranged from 5% in 1985 to 23.8% in 1996 to 8.5% in 2006 in accordance with professional recommendations at the time. However, of the women that opt for a TOLAC, between 60%–80% will successfully give birth vaginally, which is comparable to the overall vaginal delivery rate in the United States in 2010.

The chance of having a successful VBAC is decreased by the following factors:

- Labor induction
- No previous vaginal birth
- Body mass index greater than 30
- Previous caesarean for obstructed labour
- No epidural anaesthesia
- Previous preterm caesarean birth
- Cervical dilation at admission to labour ward less than 4 cm
- Less than 2 years from previous caesarean birth
- Advanced maternal age
- Support from hospital, care provider, and staff

When the first four factors are present, successful VBAC is achieved in only 40% of cases. In contrast, in women with a previous caesarean section who have had a subsequent vaginal birth, the chance of a successful vaginal birth again is estimated at 87–90%.

=== Risks in future pregnancies ===
ERCS, as compared to VBAC, further increases the risks of complications in future pregnancies. Complications whose risks significantly increase with increasing number of repeated caesarean sections include:

- Placenta accreta, estimated to be present in 0.2%, 0.3%, 0.6%, 2.1%, 2.3% and 6.7% of women undergoing their first, second, third, fourth, fifth, and sixth or more caesarean sections, respectively. According to the United States Agency for Healthcare Research and Quality, "Abnormal placentation has been associated with both maternal and neonatal morbidity including need for antepartum hospitalization, preterm delivery, emergent caesarean delivery, hysterectomy, blood transfusion, surgical injury, intensive care unit (ICU) stay, and fetal and maternal death and may be life-threatening for mother and baby."
- Hysterectomy, estimated to be performed in 0.7%, 0.4%, 0.9%, 2.4%, 3.5% and 9.0% of women undergoing their first, second, third, fourth, fifth, and sixth or more caesarean sections, respectively
- Injury to bladder, bowel or ureter
- Ileus
- The need for postoperative ventilation
- Intensive care unit admission
- Blood transfusion requirement, estimated at 7%, 8% and 14% with a history of two, three and five caesarean births, respectively.
- Duration of operative time and hospital stay.

=== Other ===
Aside from uterine rupture risk, the drawbacks of VBAC are usually minor and identical to those of any vaginal delivery, including the risk of perineal tearing. Maternal morbidity, NICU admissions, length of hospital stay, and medical costs are typically reduced following a VBAC rather than a repeat caesarean delivery.

A VBAC, compared with ERCS, carries around 1% additional risk of either blood transfusion (mainly because of antepartum hemorrhage), postpartum haemorrhage or endometritis.

== Society and culture ==
While vaginal births after caesarean (VBAC) are not uncommon today, the rate of VBAC has declined to include less than 10% of births after previous caesarean in the USA. Although caesarean deliveries made up only 5% of births overall in the USA until the mid-1970s, it was commonly believed that for women with previous caesarean sections, "Once a Caesarean, always a Caesarean". A consumer-driven movement supporting VBAC changed medical practice and led to soaring rates of VBAC in the 1980s and early 1990s, but rates of VBAC dramatically dropped after the publication of a highly publicized scientific study showing worse outcomes for VBACs as compared to repeat caesarean and the resulting medicolegal changes within obstetrics. In 2010, the National Institutes of Health, U.S. Department of Health and Human Services, and American College of Obstetricians and Gynecologists all released statements in support of increasing VBAC access and rates.

=== Trends in the United States ===
Although caesarean sections made up only 5% of all deliveries in the early 1970s, among women who did have primary caesarean sections, the century-old opinion held, "Once a caesarean, always a caesarean." Overall, cesarean sections became so commonplace that the caesarean delivery rate climbed to over 31% in 2006. A mother-driven movement supporting VBAC changed standard medical practice, and rates of VBAC rose in the 1980s and early 1990s. However, a major turning point occurred in 1996 when one well publicized study in The New England Journal of Medicine reported that vaginal delivery after previous caesarean section resulted in more maternal complications than a repeat caesarean delivery. The American College of Obstetricians and Gynecologists subsequently issued guidelines which identified VBAC as a high-risk delivery requiring the availability of an anesthesiologist, an obstetrician, and an operating room on standby. Logistical and legal (professional liability) concerns led many hospitals to enact overt or de facto VBAC bans. As a result, the rate at which VBAC was attempted fell from 26% in the early 1990s to 8.5% in 2006.

In March 2010, the National Institutes of Health met to consolidate and discuss the overall up-to-date body of VBAC scientific data and concluded, "Given the available evidence, trial of labor is a reasonable option for many pregnant women with one prior low transverse uterine incision." Simultaneously, the U.S. Department of Health and Human Services Agency for Healthcare Research and Quality reported that VBAC is a reasonable and safe choice for the majority of women with prior caesarean and that there is emerging evidence of serious harms relating to multiple caesareans. In July 2010, The American College of Obstetricians and Gynecologists (ACOG) similarly revised their own guidelines to be less restrictive of VBAC, stating, "Attempting a vaginal birth after cesarean (VBAC) is a safe and appropriate choice for most women who have had a prior cesarean delivery, including for some women who have had two previous cesareans." and this is also the current position of the Royal College of Obstetricians and Gynaecologists in the UK.

Enhanced access to VBAC has been recommended based on the most recent scientific data on the safety of VBAC as compared to repeat caesarean section, including the following recommendation emerging from the NIH VBAC conference panel in March 2010, "We recommend that hospitals, maternity care providers, health care and professional liability insurers, consumers, and policymakers collaborate on the development of integrated services that could mitigate or even eliminate current barriers to trial of labor." The U.S Department of Health and Human Services' Healthy People 2020 initiative includes objectives to reduce the primary caesarean rate and to increase the VBAC rate by at least 10% each.

The American College of Obstetricians and Gynecologists (ACOG) modified the guidelines on vaginal birth after previous Caesarean delivery in 1999, 2004, and again in 2010. In 2004, this modification to the guideline included the addition of the following recommendation:

Because uterine rupture may be catastrophic, VBAC should be attempted in institutions equipped to respond to emergencies with physicians immediately available to provide emergency care.

In 2010, ACOG modified these guidelines again to express more encouragement of VBAC, but maintained it should still be undertaken at facilities capable of emergency care, though patient autonomy in assuming increased levels of risk should be respected.

The recommendation for access to emergency care during trial of labor has, in some cases, had a major impact on the availability of VBACs to birthing mothers in the US. For example, a study of the change in frequency of VBAC deliveries in California after the change in guidelines, published in 2006, found the VBAC rate fell to 13.5% after the change, compared with 24% VBAC rate before the change. The new recommendation has been interpreted by many hospitals as indicating a full surgical team must be standing by to perform a Caesarean section for the full duration of a VBAC woman's labor. Hospitals that prohibit VBACs entirely are said to have a 'VBAC ban'. In these situations, birthing mothers are forced to choose between having a repeat Caesarean section, finding an alternate hospital in which to deliver their babies or attempting delivery outside the hospital setting.

Most recently, enhanced access to VBAC has been recommended based on updated scientific data on the safety of VBAC as compared to repeat caesarean section, including the following recommendation emerging from the NIH VBAC conference panel in March 2010, "We recommend that hospitals, maternity care providers, health care and professional liability insurers, consumers, and policymakers collaborate on the development of integrated services that could mitigate or even eliminate current barriers to trial of labor." The U.S Department of Health and Human Services' Healthy People 2020 initiative includes objectives to reduce the primary cesarean rate and to increase the VBAC rate by at least 10% each.

=== Position statements ===
ACOG recommends that obstetricians offer most women with one prior cesarean section with a low-transverse incision a trial of labor (TOLAC) and that obstetricians should discuss the risks and benefits of VBAC with these patients.

=== Court case ===
Pemberton v. Tallahassee Memorial Regional Center, 66 F. Supp. 2d 1247 (N.D. Fla. 1999), is a case in the United States regarding reproductive rights. Pemberton had a previous Caesarean section (vertical incision), and with her second child attempted to have a VBAC. When a doctor she had approached about a related issue at the Tallahassee Memorial Regional Center found out, he and the hospital sued to force her to get a c-section. The court held that the rights of the fetus at or near birth outweighed the rights of Pemberton to determine her own medical care. She was physically forced to stop laboring, and taken to the hospital, where a c-section was performed. Her suit against the hospital was dismissed. The court held that a cesarean section at the end of a full-term pregnancy was here deemed to be medically necessary by doctors to avoid a substantial risk that the fetus would die during delivery due to uterine rupture, a risk of 4–6% according to the hospital's doctors and 2% according to Pemberton's doctors. Furthermore, the court held that a state's interest in preserving the life of an unborn child outweighed the mother's constitutional interest of bodily integrity. The court held that Roe v. Wade was not applicable, because bearing an unwanted child is a greater intrusion on the mother's constitutional interests than undergoing a cesarean section to deliver a child that the mother affirmatively desires to deliver. The court further distinguished In re A.C. by stating that it left open the possibility that a non-consenting patient's interest would yield to a more compelling countervailing interest in an "extremely rare and truly exceptional case." The court then held this case to be such.

== VBAC versus no previous Caesarean section ==
VBAC, compared to vaginal birth without a history of Caesarean section, confers an increased risks for placenta previa, placenta accreta, prolonged labor, antepartum hemorrhage, uterine rupture, preterm birth, low birth weight, and stillbirth. However, some risks may be due to confounding factors related to the indication for the first caesarean, rather than due to the procedure itself.

== See also ==
- Caesarean section
