= Abdominal pregnancy =

Abnormal development of a fetus in the abdomen rather than the uterus

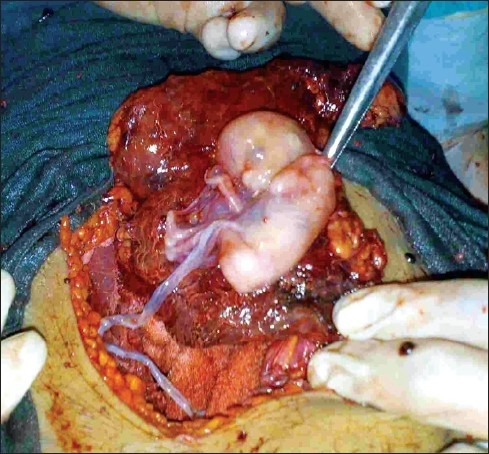
- The fetus of an abdominal pregnancy being removed from the abdomen
- Specialty: Obstetrics

An abdominal pregnancy is a rare type of ectopic pregnancy where the embryo or fetus is growing and developing outside the uterus, in the abdomen, and not in a fallopian tube (usual location), an ovary, or the broad ligament.

Because tubal, ovarian and broad ligament pregnancies are as difficult to diagnose and treat as abdominal pregnancies, their exclusion from the most common definition of abdominal pregnancy has been debated.

Others—in the minority—are of the view that abdominal pregnancy should be defined by a placenta implanted into the peritoneum.

== Signs and symptoms ==
Symptoms may include abdominal pain or vaginal bleeding during pregnancy. As this is nonspecific in areas where ultrasound is not available the diagnosis was often only discovered during surgery to investigate the abnormal symptoms. They are typically diagnosed later in the developing world than the developed. In about half of cases from a center in the developing world the diagnosis was initially missed.

It is a dangerous condition as there can be bleeding into the abdomen that results in low blood pressure and can be fatal. Other causes of death in women with an abdominal pregnancy include anemia, pulmonary embolus, coagulopathy, and infection.

== Risk factors ==
Risk factors are similar to tubal pregnancy with sexually transmitted disease playing a major role; however about half of those with ectopic pregnancy have no known risk factors (which include damage to the fallopian tubes from previous surgery or from previous ectopic pregnancy, and tobacco smoking).

== Mechanism ==
Implantation sites can be anywhere in the abdomen but can include the peritoneum outside of the uterus, the rectouterine pouch (culdesac of Douglas), omentum, bowel and its mesentery, mesosalpinx, and the peritoneum of the pelvic wall and the abdominal wall. The growing placenta may be attached to several organs including tube and ovary. Rare other sites have been the liver and spleen, giving rise to a hepatic pregnancy or splenic pregnancy, respectively. Even an early diaphragmatic pregnancy has been described in a patient where an embryo began growing on the underside of the diaphragm.

=== Primary versus secondary implantation ===
A primary abdominal pregnancy refers to a pregnancy that first implanted directly in the peritoneum, save for the tubes and ovaries; such pregnancies are very rare, only 24 cases having been reported by 2007. Typically an abdominal pregnancy is a secondary implantation which means that it originated from a tubal (less common an ovarian) pregnancy and re-implanted. Other mechanisms for secondary abdominal pregnancy include uterine rupture, rupture of a uterine rudimentary horn and fimbrial abortion.

== Diagnosis ==
Suspicion of an abdominal pregnancy is raised when the fetal anatomy can be easily felt, or the lie is abnormal, the cervix is displaced, or there is failed induction of labor. X-rays can be used to aid diagnosis. Sonography can demonstrate that the pregnancy is outside an empty uterus, there is reduced to no amniotic fluid between the placenta and the fetus, no uterine wall surrounding the fetus, fetal parts are close to the abdominal wall, the fetus has an abnormal lie, the placenta looks abnormal and there is free fluid in the abdomen. MRI has also been used with success to diagnose abdominal pregnancy and plan for surgery. Elevated alpha-fetoprotein levels are another clue of the presence of an abdominal pregnancy.

=== Ultrasound ===
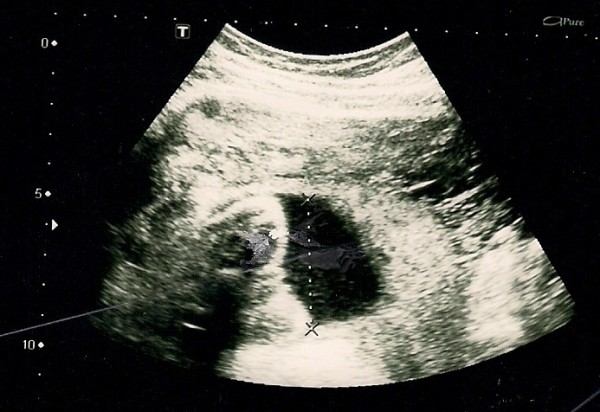
A 23-week abdominal pregnancy on ultrasound showing a normal fetus and amniotic fluid.

Most cases can be diagnosed by ultrasound. The diagnosis however may be missed with ultrasound depending on the operator's skill.

=== Criteria ===
To diagnose the rare primary abdominal pregnancy, Studdiford's criteria need to be fulfilled: tubes and ovaries should be normal, there is no abnormal connection (fistula) between the uterus and the abdominal cavity, and the pregnancy is related solely to the peritoneal surface without signs that there was a tubal pregnancy first. Studdiford's criteria were refined in 1968 by Friedrich and Rankin to include microscopic findings.

=== Differential diagnosis ===
Depending on gestational age the differential diagnoses for abdominal pregnancy include miscarriage, intrauterine fetal death, placental abruption, an acute abdomen with an intrauterine pregnancy and a fibroid uterus with an intrauterine pregnancy.

== Treatment ==
Ideally the management of abdominal pregnancy should be done by a team that has medical personnel from multiple specialties. Potential treatments consist of surgery with termination of the pregnancy (removal of the fetus) via laparoscopy or laparotomy, use of methotrexate, embolization, and combinations of these. Sapuri and Klufio indicate that conservative treatment is also possible if the following criteria are met: 1. there are no major congenital malformations; 2. the fetus is alive; 3. there is continuous hospitalization in a well-equipped and well-staffed maternity unit which has immediate blood transfusion facilities; 4. there is careful monitoring of maternal and fetal well-being; and 5. placental implantation is in the lower abdomen away from the liver and spleen. The choice is largely dictated by the clinical situation. Generally, treatment is indicated when the diagnosis is made; however, the situation of the advanced abdominal pregnancy is more complicated.

=== Advanced abdominal pregnancy ===
Advanced abdominal pregnancy refers to situations where the pregnancy continues past 20 weeks of gestation (versus early abdominal pregnancy < 20 weeks). In those situations, live births have been reported in the lay press where the babies are not uncommonly referred to as 'miracle babies'. A patient may carry a dead fetus but will not go into labor. Over time, the fetus calcifies and becomes a lithopedion.

It is generally recommended to perform a laparotomy when the diagnosis of an abdominal pregnancy is made. However, if the baby is alive and medical support systems are in place, careful watching could be considered to bring the baby to viability. Women with an abdominal pregnancy will not go into labor. Delivery in a case of an advanced abdominal pregnancy will have to be via laparotomy. The survival of the baby is reduced and high perinatal mortality rates between 40% and 95% have been reported.

Babies of abdominal pregnancies are prone to birth defects due to compression in the absence of the uterine wall and the often reduced amount of amniotic fluid surrounding the unborn baby. The rate of malformations and deformations is estimated to be about 21%; typical deformations are facial and cranial asymmetries and joint abnormalities and the most common malformations are limb defects and central nervous malformations.

Once the baby has been delivered placental management becomes an issue. In normal deliveries the contraction of uterus provides a powerful mechanism to control blood loss, however, in an abdominal pregnancy the placenta is located over tissue that cannot contract and attempts of its removal may lead to life-threatening blood loss. Thus blood transfusion is frequent in the management of patients with this kind of pregnancy, with others even using tranexamic acid and recombinant factor VIIa, which both minimize blood loss.

Generally, unless the placenta can be easily tied off or removed, it may be preferable to leave it in place and allow for a natural regression. This process may take several months and can be monitored by clinical examination, checking human chorionic gonadotropin levels and by ultrasound scanning (in particular using doppler ultrasonography. Use of methotrexate to accelerate placental regression is controversial as the large amount of necrotic tissue is a potential site for infection, mifepristone has also been used to promote placental regression. Placental vessels have also been blocked by angiographic embolization. Complications of leaving the placenta can include residual bleeding, infection, bowel obstruction, pre-eclampsia (which may all necessitate further surgery) and failure to breast feed due to placental hormones.

Outcome with abdominal pregnancy can be good for the baby and mother; Lampe described an abdominal pregnancy baby and her mother who were well more than 22 years after surgery.

== Epidemiology ==
About 1.4% of ectopic pregnancies are abdominal, or about 1 out of every 8,000 pregnancies. A report from Nigeria places the frequency in that country at 34 per 100,000 deliveries and a report from Zimbabwe at 11 per 100,000 deliveries. The maternal mortality rate is estimated to be about 5 per 1,000 cases, about seven times the rate for ectopics in general, and about 90 times the rate for a "normal" delivery (1987 US data).

== History ==
Al-Zahrawi (936–1013) is credited with first recognizing abdominal pregnancy which was apparently unknown to Greek and Roman physicians and was not mentioned in the writings of Hippocrates; Jacopo Berengario da Carpi (1460–1530) the Italian physician is credited with the first detailed anatomical description of abdominal pregnancy.

== Natural experiment ==
Because pregnancy is outside the uterus, abdominal pregnancy serves as a model of human male pregnancy or for females who lack a uterus, although such pregnancy would be dangerous. Abdominal pregnancy has served to further clarify the disease pre-eclampsia which was previously thought (1980s) to require a uterus for it to occur, however pre-eclampsia's occurrence in abdominal pregnancy (with the conceptus outside the uterus) helped throw light on pre-eclampsia's etiology. Cases of combined simultaneous abdominal and intrauterine pregnancy have been reported.
