= Pemberton v. Tallahassee Memorial Regional Center =

Court case in Florida, US

- Court: United States District Court for the Northern District of Florida
- Full case name: Pemberton v. Tallahassee Memorial Regional Center, Inc.
- Decided: October 13, 1999
- Docket nos.: 4:98-cv-00161
- Citation: 66 F. Supp. 2d 1247

Court membership
- Judge sitting: Robert Lewis Hinkle

Pemberton v. Tallahassee Memorial Regional Center, 66 F. Supp. 2d 1247 (N.D. Fla. 1999), is a case in the United States regarding reproductive rights. In particular, the case explored the limits of a woman's right to choose her medical treatment in light of fetal rights at the end of pregnancy.

Pemberton had a previous c-section with a vertical incision, and with her second child attempted to have a VBAC (vaginal birth after c-section). However, since she could not find any doctor willing to assist her in this endeavor, she labored at home, with a midwife.

When a doctor she had approached about a related issue at the Tallahassee Memorial Regional Center found out, he and the hospital sued to force her to get a c-section. The court held that the rights of the fetus at or near birth outweighed the rights of Pemberton to determine her own medical care. She was physically forced to go to the hospital, where a c-section was performed.

Her suit against the hospital was dismissed. The court held that a cesarean section at the end of a full-term pregnancy was here deemed to be medically necessary by doctors to avoid a substantial risk that the fetus would die during delivery due to uterine rupture. The risk of uterine rupture was estimated at 4–6% according to the hospital's doctors and 2% according to Pemberton's doctors. Furthermore, the court held that a state's interest in preserving the life of an unborn child outweighed the mother's constitutional interest of bodily integrity. The court held that Roe v. Wade was not applicable, because bearing an unwanted child is a greater intrusion on the mother's constitutional interests than undergoing a cesarean section to deliver a child that the mother affirmatively desires to deliver. The court further distinguished In re A.C. by stating that it left open the possibility that a non-consenting patient's interest would yield to a more compelling countervailing interest in an "extremely rare and truly exceptional case." The court then held this case to be such.

== Later case involving Tallahassee ==
In March 2009, a Leon County Circuit Court ordered Samantha Burton, then 25 weeks pregnant with her third child, to remain in Tallahassee Memorial Hospital on bed rest against her will. Three days after the court order was issued, Burton had an emergency C-section, resulting in a stillbirth. The next year, the Florida District Court of Appeals ruled that the court cannot impose unwanted treatment on a pregnant woman "in the best interests of the fetus" without providing evidence of fetal viability.
