= Unicornuate uterus =

Birth defect in which only one uterine horn fully develops

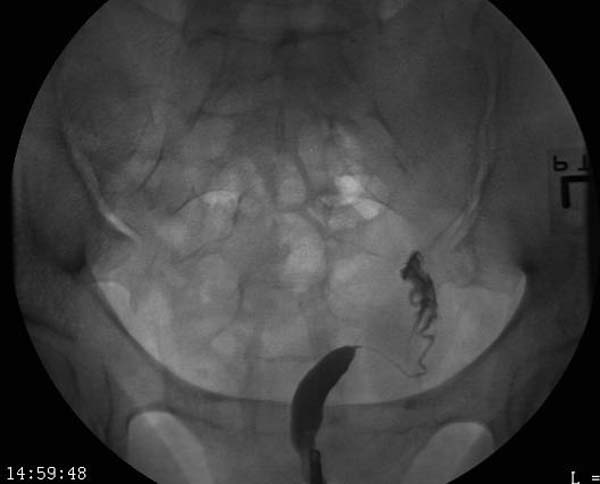
- A unicornuate uterus as seen on a hysterosalpingogram
- Specialty: Gynecology

A unicornuate uterus represents a uterine malformation where the uterus is formed from only one of the paired Müllerian ducts while the other Müllerian duct does not develop or only in a rudimentary fashion. The sometimes called hemi-uterus has a single horn linked to the ipsilateral fallopian tube that faces its ovary.

== Signs and symptoms ==
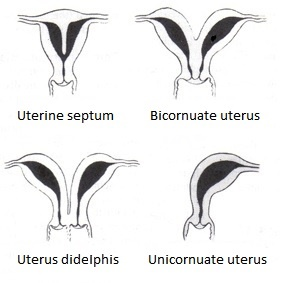
Four types of uterine malformations.

Women with the condition may be asymptomatic and unaware of having a unicornuate uterus; normal pregnancy may occur. In a review of the literature Reichman et al. analyzed the data on pregnancy outcome of 290 women with a unicornuate uterus. 175 women had conceived for a total of 468 pregnancies. They found that about 50% of patients delivered a live baby. The rates for ectopic pregnancy was 2.7%, for miscarriage 34%, and for preterm delivery 20%, while the intrauterine demise rate was 10%. Thus patients with a unicornuate uterus are at a higher risk for pregnancy loss and obstetrical complications.

== Cause ==
The uterus is normally formed during embryogenesis by the fusion of the two Müllerian ducts. If one of the ducts does not develop, only one Müllerian duct contributes to the uterine development. This uterus may or may not be connected to Müllerian structure on the opposite site if the Müllerian duct on that site undergoes some development. A unicornuate uterus has a single cervix and vagina. Associated defects may affect the renal system, and less common, the skeleton.

The condition is much less common than these other uterine malformations: arcuate uterus, septate uterus, and bicornuate uterus. While the uterus didelphys is estimated to occur in 1/3,000 women, the unicornuate uterus appears to be even more infrequent with an estimated occurrence of about 1/4,000.

== Diagnosis ==
A pelvic examination will typically reveal a single vagina and a single cervix. Investigations are usually prompted on the basis of reproductive problems.

Helpful techniques to investigate the uterine structure are transvaginal ultrasonography and sonohysterography, hysterosalpingography, MRI, and hysteroscopy. More recently 3-D ultrasonography has been advocated as an excellent non-invasive method to evaluate uterine malformations.

=== Rudimentary horn ===
A unicornuate uterus may be associated with a rudimentary horn on the opposite site. This horn may be communicating with the uterus, and linked to the ipsilateral tube. Occasionally a pregnancy may implant into such a horn setting up a dangerous situation as such pregnancy can lead to a potentially fatal uterine rupture. The majority of pregnancies in a rudimentary horn result in torsion and rupture, although there are still some cases of full-term pregnancies. Surgical resection of the horn is indicated.

== Management ==
Patients with a unicornuate uterus may need special attention during pregnancy as miscarriage, fetal demise, premature birth, and malpresentation are more common. It is unproven that cerclage procedures are helpful.

Although it is unclear whether interventions before conception or early in pregnancy such as resection of the rudimentary horn and prophylactic cervical cerclage decidedly improve obstetrical outcomes, current practice suggests that such interventions may be helpful.
