= Florida A&M Hospital =

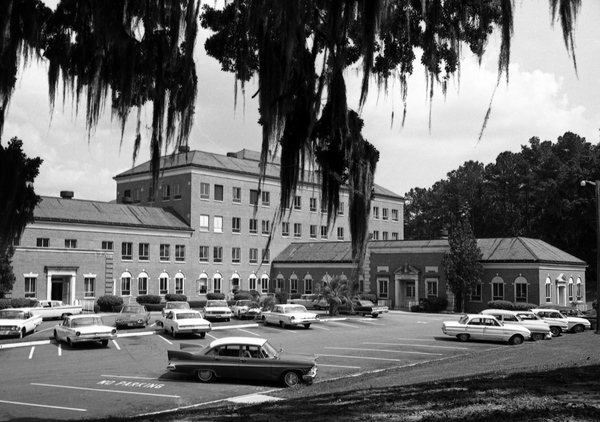
- Florida A&M Hospital, circa 1960s

Geography
- Location: Tallahassee, Florida, United States
- Coordinates: 30.426124°N 84.282935°W

Organization
- Type: General
- Affiliated university: Florida Agricultural and Mechanical University

Services
- Beds: 105

History
- Former name: Sanatorium
- Opened: 1911 as a Sanatorium, 1946 as FAMC Hospital, Health Center and Nursing School, 1951 dedicated as a hospital
- Closed: 1971

Links
- Lists: Hospitals in Florida

Florida Agriculture & Mechanical Hospital (1911-1971) was the first institution in Florida providing medical care to African Americans, who, during the segregation period, were not permitted to receive care at whites-only hospitals. (See Tallahassee Memorial HealthCare on Tallahassee's other hospitals of the period.) There was no other such institution within 150 miles (240 km) of Tallahassee. In 1940, "less than a dozen" counties in Florida had hospital facilities for Negroes.

== Founding ==
The hospital was originally designated a sanitarium, had 19 beds, and was created to allow Florida A&M University (FAMU) to establish a nursing program. It was housed in a wooden building located slightly NW of the brick building, with 105 beds, which replaced it in 1950. Funding to build the hospital was provided in part to avoid integration at Tallahassee Memorial Hospital, by creating a "separate but equal" facility. (See Gibbs Junior College for other such efforts in Florida.) It was officially dedicated as a hospital in 1951, although since 1946 it was named the FAMC Hospital, Health Center and Nursing School. Like most hospitals serving African Americans, it was chronically underfunded; Tallahassee levied a tax on residents to support the whites-only hospital, but refused to distribute any of the funds to the FAMU hospital, whose patients were almost exclusively African Americans.

== Closure ==
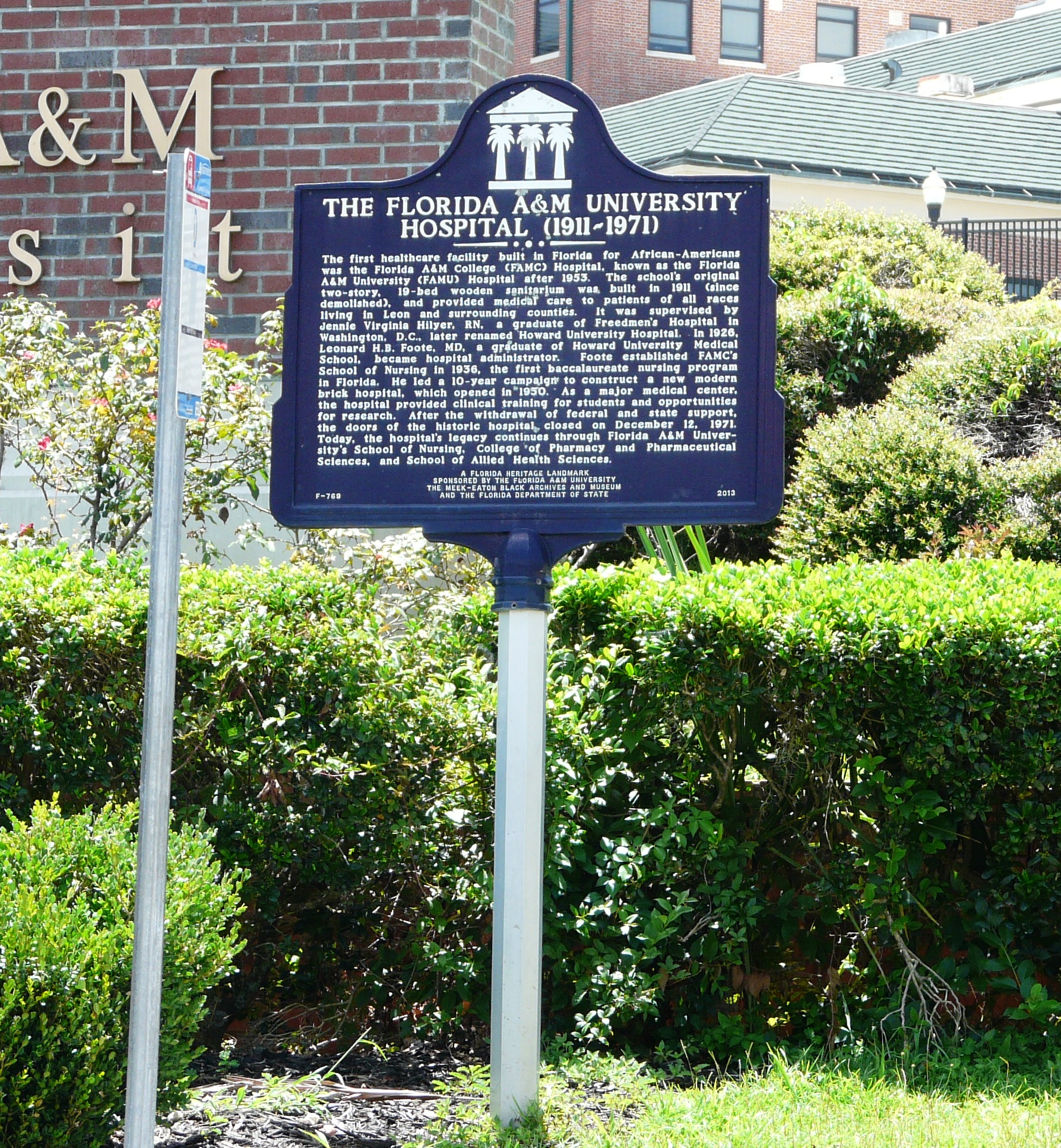
Historical marker on Adams Street

The hospital closed as a result of the Civil Rights Act of 1964, and the federal government's threat to withhold Medicare funding from both the FAMU hospital and Tallahassee Memorial Hospital if racial segregation continued. Tallahassee Memorial started admitting black patients, and federal and state funding which previously supported the FAMU Hospital was transferred to Tallahassee Memorial. When state funding was ended in 1967, the name was changed to Tallahassee A&M Hospital and it was leased to the city and county from 1967 to 1970, renewed for 1970-72. On December 24, 1971, citing unsustainable losses, the Hospital Board announced that it was closing down the hospital, which at that time had three patients housed there. FAMU President Dr. B. L. Perry, Jr., cited "the unwillingness of white doctors to commit patients to it. Concurrent with this problem was the unavailability of black doctors in this community". He also cited the low salary for nurses, which did not meet the requirements of the minimum wage and hour law and did not attract applicants. As was typical of racial desegregation in the U.S., it was the black facility that closed, and the employees lost their jobs.

Two identical historical markers commemorating the hospital were erected in 2013. One is in front of the former hospital building. The other, at an entrance to the campus, is on the SW corner of the intersection of Palmer Avenue and South Adams Street.

The former hospital is currently (2017) the Foote-Hilyer Administration Building. It continues to house the university's student health center.
