= Pregnant patients' rights in the United States =

Pregnant patients' rights regarding medical care during the pregnancy and childbirth are specifically a patient's rights within a medical setting and should not be confused with pregnancy discrimination. A great deal of discussion regarding pregnant patients' rights has taken place in the United States.

== History ==
In Western countries, medical services used during labor and delivery have increased since the 1930s. Starting in the 1950s, with the natural childbirth movement gaining strength, concern increased over typical hospital practices during childbirth. These medical services included medications and procedures that were not always necessary – some of which had potential to harm the mother, the baby, or both. Various health-related and consumer organization groups began to advocate for a pregnant woman's right to be informed about medical services related to pregnancy and childbirth and for her right to refuse such services.

In the United States, the American College of Obstetricians and Gynecologists (ACOG) acknowledged the legal obligation of physicians to obtain informed consent for procedures related to pregnancy and childbirth in 1974.

=== Decision-making regarding pregnant patients' care ===
A 1987 study found that, in the preceding decade, at least 22 hospitals in the United States sought direction from the courts regarding care for pregnant patients. Fifteen court orders were sought, all but one without careful study of the legal facts of the case.

In re A.C., 573 A.2d 1235 (1990), was a District of Columbia Court of Appeals case, that was the first American appellate court case decided against a forced Caesarean section, although the decision was issued after the fatal procedure was performed. Physicians performed a Caesarean section upon patient Angela Carder (née Stoner) without informed consent in an unsuccessful attempt to save the life of her baby. The case stands as a landmark in United States case law establishing the rights of informed consent and bodily integrity for pregnant patients.

== Specific rights advocated ==
Advocates endorse a pregnant patient's right to participate in medical decisions that may affect her well-being and that of her child. Specifically, these include but are not limited to the right to know the effects and risks to both the woman and the child associated with a drug or procedure, as well as the right to know about additional and alternative treatments.

Some groups, such as the American Hospital Association in its "Patient's Bill of Rights", advocate additional rights, including rights to the following:

- To receive medical assistance regardless of where the patient gives birth (whether at home, in a hospital, etc.).
- To refuse drug treatment of any kind.
- To be accompanied during labor and birth by a person or persons she cares for and to whom she looks for emotional support.
- To labor at her own pace without intervention if she chooses.
- To choose her own birthing position.
- To keep her baby at her bedside immediately after birth if the baby does not require specialized care, and to feed the baby according to a schedule she decides rather than according to a standard hospital regimen.

== See also ==
- Patient advocacy
- Patient empowerment
- Pregnant patients' rights, which addresses the subject throughout the world
- Women's rights in the United States
