= In re A.C. =

1990 District of Columbia court case

- Court: District of Columbia Court of Appeals
- Full case name: In re A.C., Appellant.
- Decided: April 26, 1990
- Citation: 573 A.2d 1235

Court membership
- Judges sitting: Judith W. Rogers, Theodore R. Newman Jr., John M. Ferren, James A. Belson, John A. Terry, John M. Steadman, Frank E. Schwelb, Julia Cooper Mack

Case opinions
- Decision by: Terry
- Concurrence: Rogers, Newman, Ferren, Steadman, Schwelb
- Concur/dissent: Belson

Keywords
- Bodily integrity; Informed consent; Rights of pregnant patients

In re A.C., 573 A.2d 1235 (1990), was a District of Columbia Court of Appeals case. It was the first American appellate court case decided against a forced Caesarean section, although the decision was issued after the fatal procedure was performed. Physicians performed a Caesarean section upon patient Angela Carder (née Stoner) without informed consent in an unsuccessful attempt to save the life of her baby. The case stands as a landmark in United States case law establishing the rights of informed consent and bodily integrity for pregnant women.

== Background ==
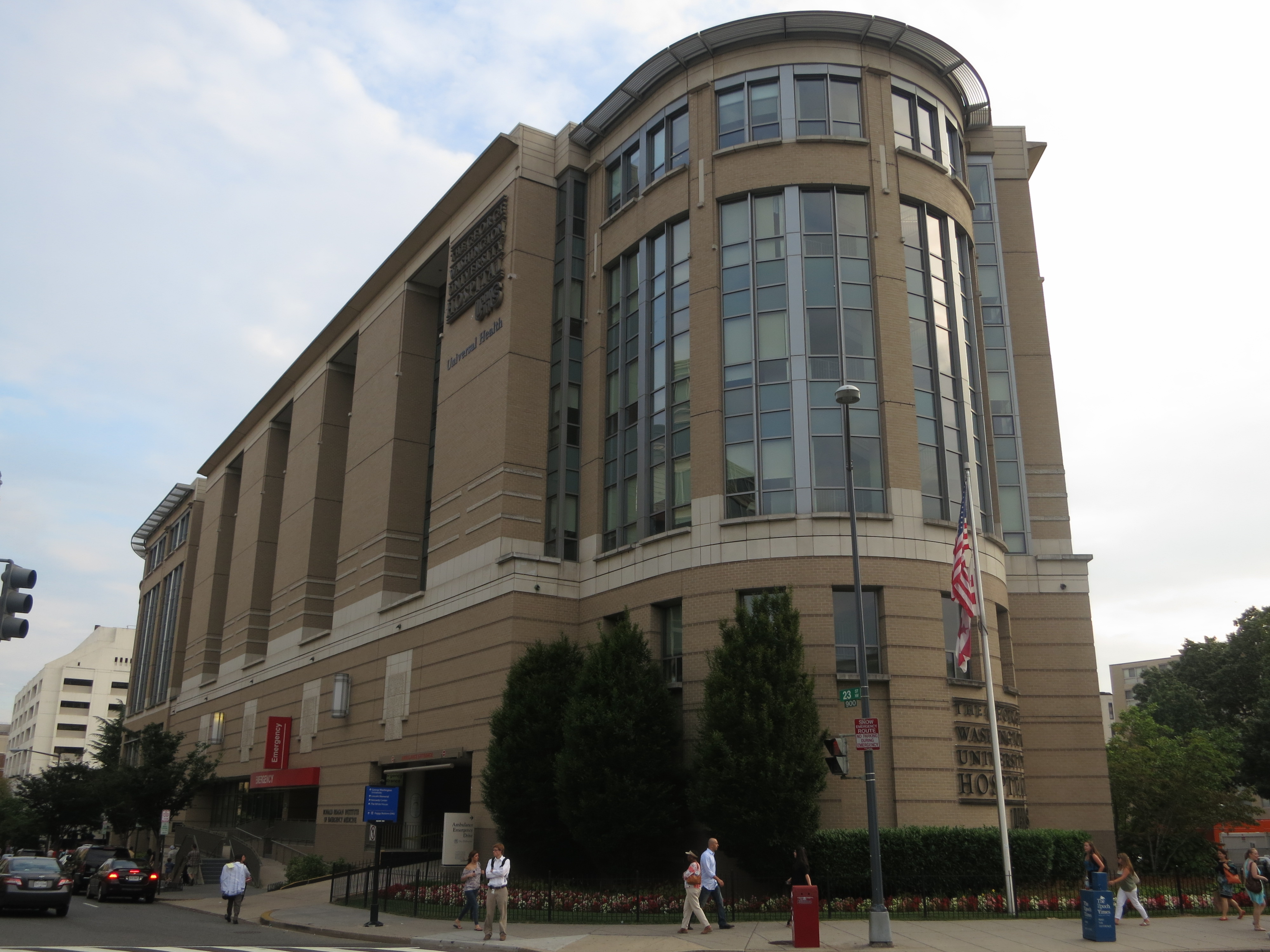
George Washington University Hospital

At age thirteen, Angela Stoner was diagnosed with a rare and usually fatal form of cancer, Ewing's sarcoma. After years of chemotherapy and radiation therapy she was declared to be in remission. At twenty-seven, she married and became pregnant. Carder was referred to George Washington University Hospital's high-risk pregnancy clinic during her fifteenth week due to her medical history.

During a routine hospital visit on June 9, 1987, Carder received an X ray due to complaints of back pain and shortness of breath. Her cancer was shown to have returned in the form of an inoperable tumor, causing her to be admitted to hospital two days later. When Carder was twenty-six weeks pregnant, her cancer was discovered to have recurred and metastasized to her lung. The doctors at George Washington University Hospital in Washington, D.C. inserted an oral feeding tube into her and administered sedatives in an effort to delay her death and increase her fetus' chance of continued development. On June 12, Carder initially expressed a desire to deliver the baby. Her condition worsened and physicians notified Carder of her terminal illness on June 15, leading Carder to consent to palliative care. The intent of such treatment was to prolong her life, raising the survival rate of the fetus. Carder was again inquired as to whether she wished to deliver the baby, to which she provided an ambiguous answer.

== Initial Hearing and Procedure ==
On June 16, administrators of the hospital convened a court hearing at the facility to request an emergency Caesarean section. Carder's husband, parents, and personal obstetricians opposed the C-section on the ground that neither Carder nor the fetus would survive. Evidence to the court hypothesized that the fetus currently had a fifty to sixty percent chance of survival, which would decrease if the procedure was delayed. The court was informed that the fetus was viable, or could live outside the mother, but would be unlikely to survive a post-mortem delivery. It was also stated that Carder was likely to die sooner as a result of such a procedure. However, doctors' testimony to the court was contradicting in regards to the prognosis of the procedure. The judge had also been unable to identify Carder's wishes or her level of competency. Ultimately, an order was issued by the judge authorizing the hospital to perform an immediate Caesarean section. The judge based the decision on both evidence provided by the hospital and precedent of In Re Madyun.

Carder was informed of the court's order once she became conscious and she was asked if she wanted to proceed with the Caesarean section. Although she initially confirmed her intent to proceed, she reportedly contradicted herself a few moments later. The court maintained its decision and ordered the procedure to continue. Given the apparent change in circumstances, Carder's family and attorney attempted to gain a stay of proceedings from the judge, but the request was denied.

Thus, Carder underwent the operation. The fetus reportedly survived for three hours after the surgery, while Carder survived two days before her death. Some physicians suggest that she would have lived a few days longer if not for the Caesarean section.

== Appeal Proceedings ==
In the wake of the surgery, Carder's family and the American Civil Liberties Union's Reproductive Freedom Project asked the D.C. Court of Appeals to vacate the order and its legal precedent, on grounds that the order had violated Carder's right to informed consent and her constitutional rights of privacy and bodily integrity. One hundred and twenty organizations joined amicus briefs on Carder's behalf, including the American Medical Association and the American College of Obstetricians and Gynecologists. Two groups defended the forced surgery: the Americans United for Life and the United Catholic Conference, now known as the United States Conference of Catholic Bishops (USCCB). On April 26, 1990, the court vacated the initial court order by issuing the ruling In re A.C. The decision found the judge had failed to properly balance the rights of Carder not to consent to the procedure and the interests of the state. In re A.C. is commonly lauded as a victory for women's rights, but it did not grant absolute autonomy of a woman against procedures ordered by the state. Instead, it asserted that in "virtually all cases," a patient's desires must be adhered to if they are deemed competent.

== Civil Suit ==
At the same time as the Court of Appeals case, the ACLU and Carder's parents, Daniel and Nettie Stoner, instituted a civil action, Stoners v. George Washington University Hospital, et al., suing the hospital for deprivation of human rights, discrimination, wrongful death and malpractice, among other charges. In November 1990, days before the scheduled trial was to begin, the hospital settled out of court for an undisclosed amount of money and a promise of new hospital policies protecting the rights of pregnant women.

== See also ==
- Pemberton v. Tallahassee Memorial Regional Center
- In re Fetus Brown, 689 N.E.2d 397, 400 (Ill. App. Ct. 1997) (overturning a court-ordered blood transfusion of a pregnant woman)
- In re Baby Boy Doe, 632 N.E.2d 326 (Ill. App. Ct. 1994) (holding that courts may not balance whatever rights a fetus may have against the rights of a competent woman, whose choice to refuse medical treatment as invasive as a cesarean section must be honored even if the choice may be harmful to the fetus).
- Stallman v. Youngquist, 531 N.E.2d 355, 359-61 (Ill. 1988) (refusing to recognize the tort of maternal prenatal negligence, holding that granting fetuses legal rights in this manner "would involve an unprecedented intrusion into the privacy and autonomy of the [state's female] citizens").
- Use of restraints on pregnant women
