= Tallahassee Memorial HealthCare =

Community healthcare system in the United States

Coordinates: 30.4573772°N 84.261461°W

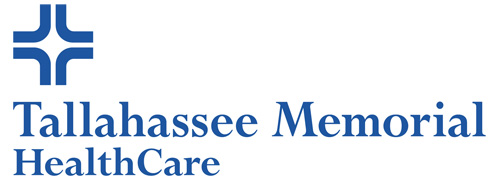
- Type: Hospital
- Industry: Health care
- Founded: Tallahassee, Florida
- Headquarters: United States
- Area served: Tallahassee Metro Area & Portions of Southwest Georgia
- Number of employees: 4,457 (2014)
- Website: www.tmh.org

Tallahassee Memorial HealthCare (TMH), the community health anchor for Florida State University Health, is a private, not-for-profit founded in 1948. Located in Tallahassee, Florida, United States and serving a 22-county region in North Florida and South Georgia, TMH comprises a 772-bed acute care hospital, a psychiatric hospital, multiple specialty care centers, five residency programs, 50 affiliated physician practices, and partnerships with Alliant Management Services, Apalachee Center, Calhoun Liberty Hospital, Capital Health Plan, Doctors’ Memorial Hospital, Florida State University, Big Bend Hospice and Radiology Associates.

== History ==
Tallahassee's first hospital was Johnston's Hospital, later the Seventh Day Adventist Hospital, and the Forsyth Hospital, located at 805 N. Gadsden Street. It closed as a hospital when Tallahassee Memorial opened, but remained in operation as a nursing home.

In a small room at the former Air Force base known as Dale Mabry Field, five men and one woman officially formed Tallahassee Memorial Hospital. The hospital was a wooden barracks used by the military during World War II. On November 4, 1949 the hospital known as Tallahassee Memorial Hospital opened its doors at its present location at Magnolia Drive and Miccosukee Road at a total cost of $1.5 million, plus $6,000 for the land. Tallahassee Memorial gained national recognition in 1954 for its effective handling of a polio-like virus that hit Florida's Big Bend and on September 10, 1958 TMH expanded with the addition of a new wing housing an emergency department, a medical floor, obstetrics service, and surgical services.

From its founding until the late 1960s, Tallahassee Memorial did not admit black patients, who were treated at Florida A&M Hospital. (This was true of most Southern hospitals during the segregation/Jim Crow period.) Following the Civil Rights Act of 1964, and Medicare's refusal to support segregated hospitals, Tallahassee Memorial started admitting black patients, and the Florida A&M Hospital closed in 1971.

On October 19, 1964, M.T. Mustian was appointed administrator of Tallahassee Memorial. His leadership lasted for 25 years. In 1974 the Family Practice Residency program opened and helped alleviate the hospital's shortage of doctors. On June 30, 1976 TMH became Tallahassee Memorial Regional Medical Center, Inc. In 1977 Tallahassee Memorial helped establish Voluntary Hospitals of America to unify non-profit hospitals nationwide. In 1978 The TMH Auxiliary provided 40,932 hours and purchased a heart-lung machine for $24,460 and a portable image intensifier for $43,500.

During January 1988 Duncan Moore, administrator of Phoebe Putney Memorial Hospital in Albany, Georgia, accepted the position as president and CEO of Tallahassee Memorial, which lasted until his retirement in 2003. In 2003 Mark G. O'Bryant accepted the position of CEO and President, ushering in a new era. In 1997 TMH had an on-site kindergarten and becomes one of Florida's newest partnership schools. TMRMC became Tallahassee Memorial HealthCare in 1998.

In 2003 TMH started an improvement and expansion plan adding the Behavioral Health Center, Bixler Emergency Center, Cancer Center, Heart and Vascular Center, Medicine Services, NeuroScience and Orthopedic, Surgery Center, and Women's and Children's Services followed by a Women's Pavilion. The Women's Pavilion features the region's only Level III Neonatal Intensive Care Unit.

On January 15, 2008 TMH opened the Urgent Care Center to better improve patient flow through the Emergency Center. This new center gives patients with nonemergency issues somewhere to go instead of waiting in the Emergency Center as long.

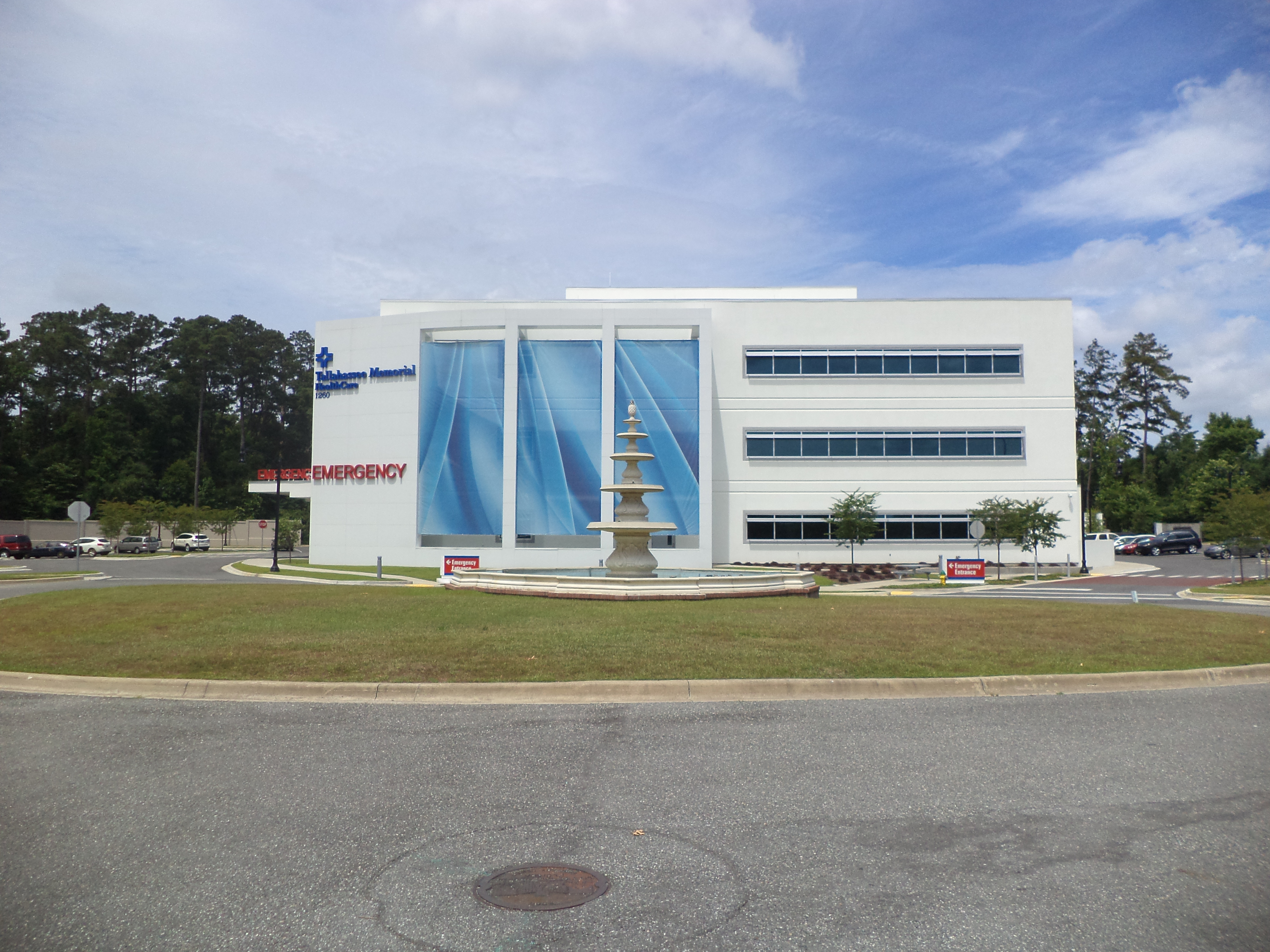
Tallahassee Memorial Emergency Center – Northeast

The Emergency Center-Northeast was added in 2013 to cater to children and senior patients.

In 2024, TMH opened a new Medical Office Plaza in Panama City Beach, Florida.

== See also ==
- Pemberton v. Tallahassee Memorial Regional Center
