= Carhart =

Carhart is a surname. Notable people with the surname include:

- Arthur Carhart (1892–1978), US Forest Service official, writer and conservationist who inspired wilderness protection in the United States
- Clara H. Sully Carhart (1843–1913), Canadian-born American educator and reformer
- Edith Beebe Carhart (1879–1964), American librarian
- Henry Smith Carhart Ph.B. (1844–1920), American physicist and university professor
- LeRoy Carhart (born 1941), American physician from Nebraska
- Raymond Carhart (born 1912), audiologist from Mexico City
- Thad Carhart (born 1950), American writer living in Paris
- Timothy Carhart (born 1953), American actor

== See also ==
- Gonzales v. Carhart, 550 U.S. 124 (2007), United States Supreme Court case which upheld the Partial-Birth Abortion Ban Act of 2003
- Stenberg v. Carhart, 530 U.S. 914 (2000), United States Supreme Court case which made performing partial-birth abortion illegal
- Carhart notch in an audiogram (a graph showing audible frequencies)
- Carhartt, American apparel company
