= Dick Gephardt 2004 presidential campaign =

American political campaign

Gephardt for President
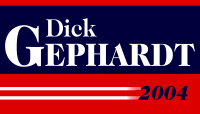
- Campaign: 2004 United States presidential election (Democratic Party primaries)
- Candidate: Dick Gephardt; House Minority Leader (1995–2003); Member of the United States House of Representatives from Missouri (1977–2005)
- Affiliation: Democratic Party
- EC formed: January 5, 2003
- Announced: February 19, 2003
- Suspended: January 20, 2004
- Key people: Steve Murphy (campaign manager)

Website
- www.dickgephardt2004.com (archived - January 16, 2004)

The 2004 presidential campaign of Dick Gephardt, the Democratic former House Minority Leader and member of the U.S. House of Representatives from Missouri, was formally launched in February 2003. Gephardt had previously ran for the Democratic presidential nomination in 1988, but lost to Michael Dukakis. In 2002, Gephardt resigned as House Minority Leader to focus on his campaign.

Gephardt's main campaign issue was universal health care, which he planned to implement after repealing Bush's tax cuts. He supported Israel and gay rights, and was against free trade deals and illegal immigration. He was generally for abortion rights; he was only in favor of allowing partial-birth abortions when the health of the mother was in danger. He was criticized by his opponents for his continued support of the Iraq War.

In January 2004, before the Democratic Iowa caucuses, Gephardt's was tied with Howard Dean to win the state. On the day of the vote, however, both candidates lost to John Kerry. Gephardt dropped out of the race the day after. After John Kerry won the Democratic nomination, Gephardt was brought up as Kerry's possible pick for vice president on the ticket, but Kerry chose John Edwards instead. Kerry privately wanted to choose Gephardt, but was convinced to choose Edwards by his campaign staff.

== Background ==
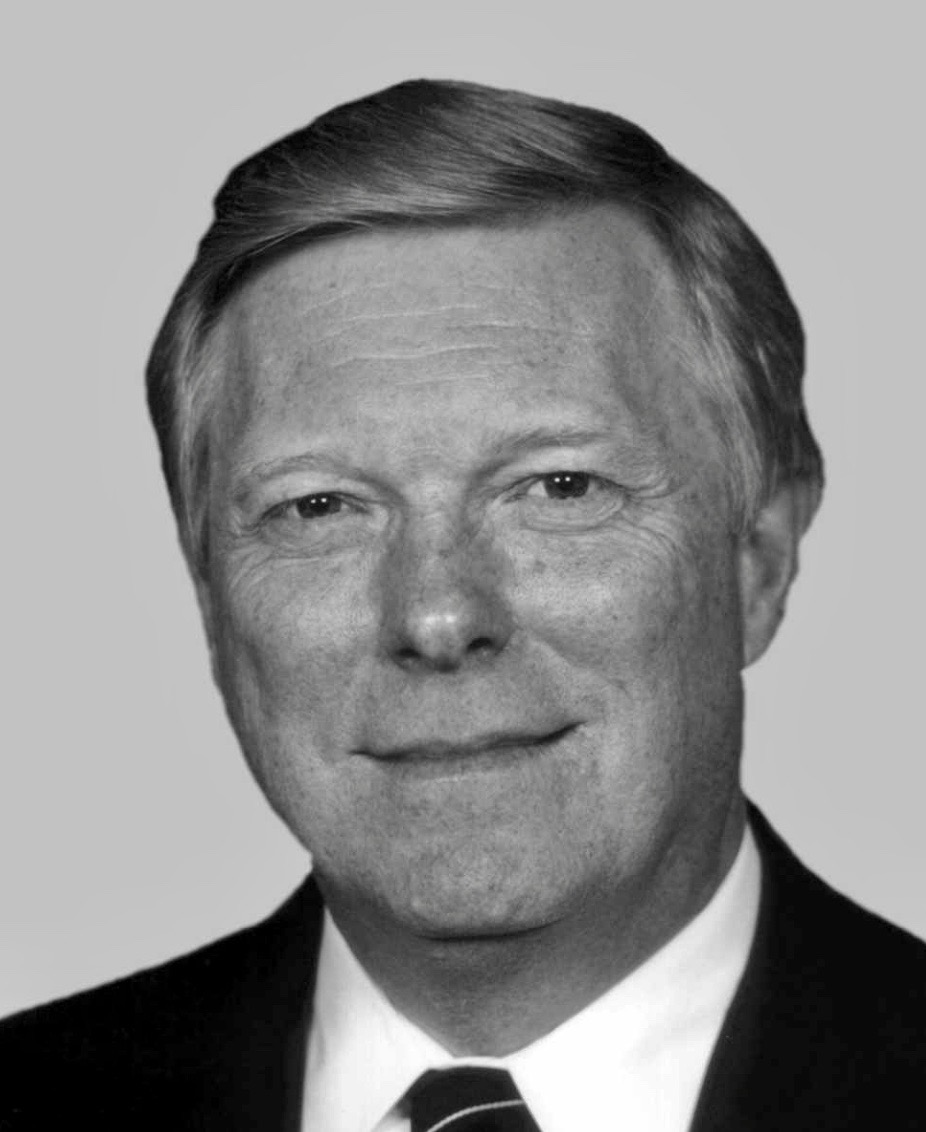
Gephardt in 1997

By 2004, Richard Gephardt had been in the House of Representatives for 27 years, and became the House Majority Leader in 1989. He became House Minority Leader in 1994, when Republicans took control of the House. In 2002, he resigned as Minority Leader to focus on his campaign for president. He had run for president in 1988 and won the Democratic Iowa caucuses, but lost the nomination to Mike Dukakis. The new campaign for the 2004 election began on January 5, 2003, with the filing of papers with the Federal Election Commission that established an exploratory committee. He was 61 at the time.

He formally announced his entry into the race for the Democratic nomination on February 19, 2003 in St. Louis, Missouri. He started with endorsements from 20 members of Congress. His opponents for the Democratic nomination were Senator Joe Lieberman, Senator John Kerry, Senator Bob Graham, former Vermont Governor Howard Dean, and general and former NATO official Wesley Clark. Gephardt's campaign manager was Steve Murphy.

== Platform ==
Gephardt's main campaign issue was promoting universal health care. His plan would have covered 97% of Americans; Bush's tax cuts would be repealed and the tax credits would be given to businesses to fund 60% of workers' employee insurance benefits.

He was against free trade deals, such as NAFTA and the United States–China Relations Act of 2000, saying they were responsible for job losses in the U.S., as American companies outsource their jobs overseas. In contrast, John Kerry and Howard Dean had voted for both trade deals. Gephardt was also against illegal immigration, particularly from Mexico, and pressured other countries to improve their working conditions and wages to prevent future illegal immigration. He also supported an international minimum wage that would tied to each countries' development level.

Gephardt criticized the George W. Bush administration for "abusing civil liberties in its drive for domestic security" and promised to fire Bush's Attorney General John Ashcroft immediately after becoming president. Gephardt still supported the Iraq War, however. Gephardt previously supported Bush in invading Iraq and insisted after the invasion that weapons of mass destruction would be found in the country. Starting in July 2003, he began to criticize Bush's specific approach to the war. He was a strong supporter of Israel, but disagreed with the U.S.' ties to Saudi Arabia, who funded global terrorism. Gephardt led Congressional opposition against the similar Gulf War in 1991, and said he changed his views on going to war with Iraq after 9/11; this is despite his vote for the Iraq Liberation Act in 1998.

Gephardt generally supported abortion rights, yet his stance on partial-birth abortions was unclear. In 1996, Gephardt voted to overturn President Bill Clinton's veto of the Partial-Birth Abortion Ban Act of 1995. In June 2003, Congress voted for a ban on the procedure, which Gephardt did not vote on because he was campaigning outside of Washington D.C. At first, he declined to say how he would have voted. In October, his campaign said he would not support he law without a provision allowing the procedure to be performed when the health of the mother was in danger. He supported gay rights, including same-sex adoptions, same-sex civil unions, and the repeal of "Don't ask, don't tell". Chrissy Gephardt, Gephardt's lesbian daughter and one of his campaign operatives, said that he was not against same-sex marriage but that it would be easier to pass same-sex civil unions.

== Campaign ==
Gephardt's career in politics was levied by his opponents as making him a "dull, Washington insider". Gephardt was seen by many as too old fashioned and unelectable, with his fundraising efforts behind that of Dean, Kerry, and Edwards, while he was tied with Joe Lieberman.

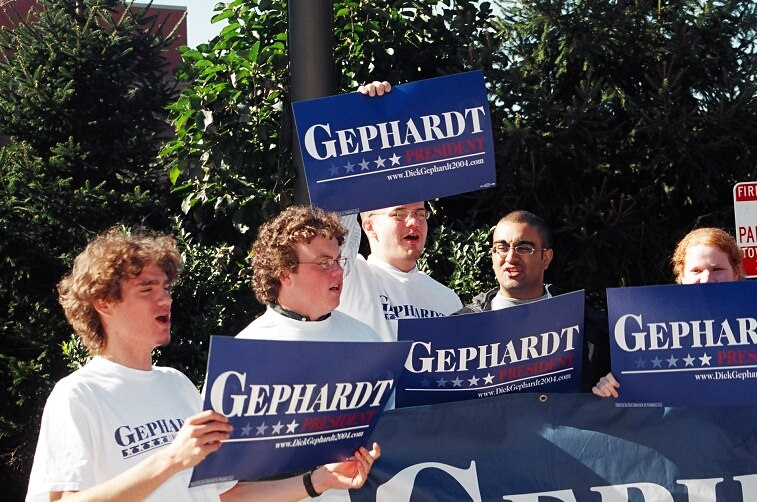
Gephardt supporters in October 2003

Throughout early 2003, ahead of the Iowa caucuses on January 19, 2004, Gephardt was ahead in Iowa. However, Howard Dean pulled ahead in the polls by August, his campaign fueled by anti-war activists. Steve Murphy claimed Dean's boost was because Gephardt had to pull his campaign's televisions ads from Iowa in November 2003; there was a spending lid imposed by federal law on candidates who accepted taxpayer matching funds. Gephardt accepted taxpayer matching funds, whereas Dean accepted donations freely.

Gephardt was endorsed by 18 "mostly industrial" unions, including the Teamsters and the Iowa United Auto Workers (UAW). However, among all union members in Iowa, Gephardt was not the most popular candidate. His campaign was embarrassed by an early August St Louis Post-Dispatch article that revealed that 11 of 33 "Gephardt team leaders" listed on his Iowa campaign's web site were actually supporting other candidates or neutral. Dean's support went down in Iowa after reports on NBC News that Dean had made remarks in 2000 that the Iowa caucuses were "dominated by special interests"; Gephardt responded, "I still haven't gotten a clear answer as to who these 'special interests' are. Are they organized labor? Farmers? Middle-class families? Senior citizens?" Gephardt's focus on trade did not resonate with Iowa voters; 1 out of 20 said trade was their main issue in the election.

On January 10, Gephardt and Dean were tied to win the caucuses. However, NBC News noted that Gephardt's rallies had low attendance compared to Dean. In the final days before, however, both Dean and Gephardt's support started in the state faded. In the caucuses, Kerry won at 38 percent. John Edwards received 32 percent, Dean 18 percent, and Gephardt 11 percent. The day after, January 20, Gephardt dropped out of the race.

== Aftermath ==
On March 3, Kerry had won enough delegates in the primaries to be the presumptive Democratic nominee. Although he dropped out of the presidential race, Gephardt was mentioned as a possible running mate for John Kerry. On March 7, New Mexico Governor Bill Richardson, seen as a strong possibility for the position himself, endorsed Gephardt for the Vice Presidency.

Nevertheless, Kerry announced that he had chosen John Edwards as his running mate on July 6. On that same day, the New York Post published an incorrect headline stating that Gephardt had become Kerry's running mate, which was compared to the 1948 "Dewey defeats Truman" front page of the Chicago Tribune. In 2007, it was revealed in the book No Excuses: Concessions of a Serial Campaigner by Bob Shrum, who served as Kerry's campaign adviser in the 2004 United States presidential election, that Kerry wanted to choose Gephardt as his nominee for vice president, but was convinced by Shrum and others to choose Edwards.

In December 2004, Gephardt retired from politics.
