= LeRoy Carhart =

American physician (1941–2023)

- Born: LeRoy Harrison Carhart; October 28, 1941; Trenton, New Jersey, U.S.
- Died: April 28, 2023 (aged 81); Bellevue, Nebraska, U.S.
- Known for: Abortion rights advocacy, late-term abortions
- Spouse: Mary Clark (m. 1964)
- Medical career
- Profession: Physician
- Sub-specialties: Late-term abortion

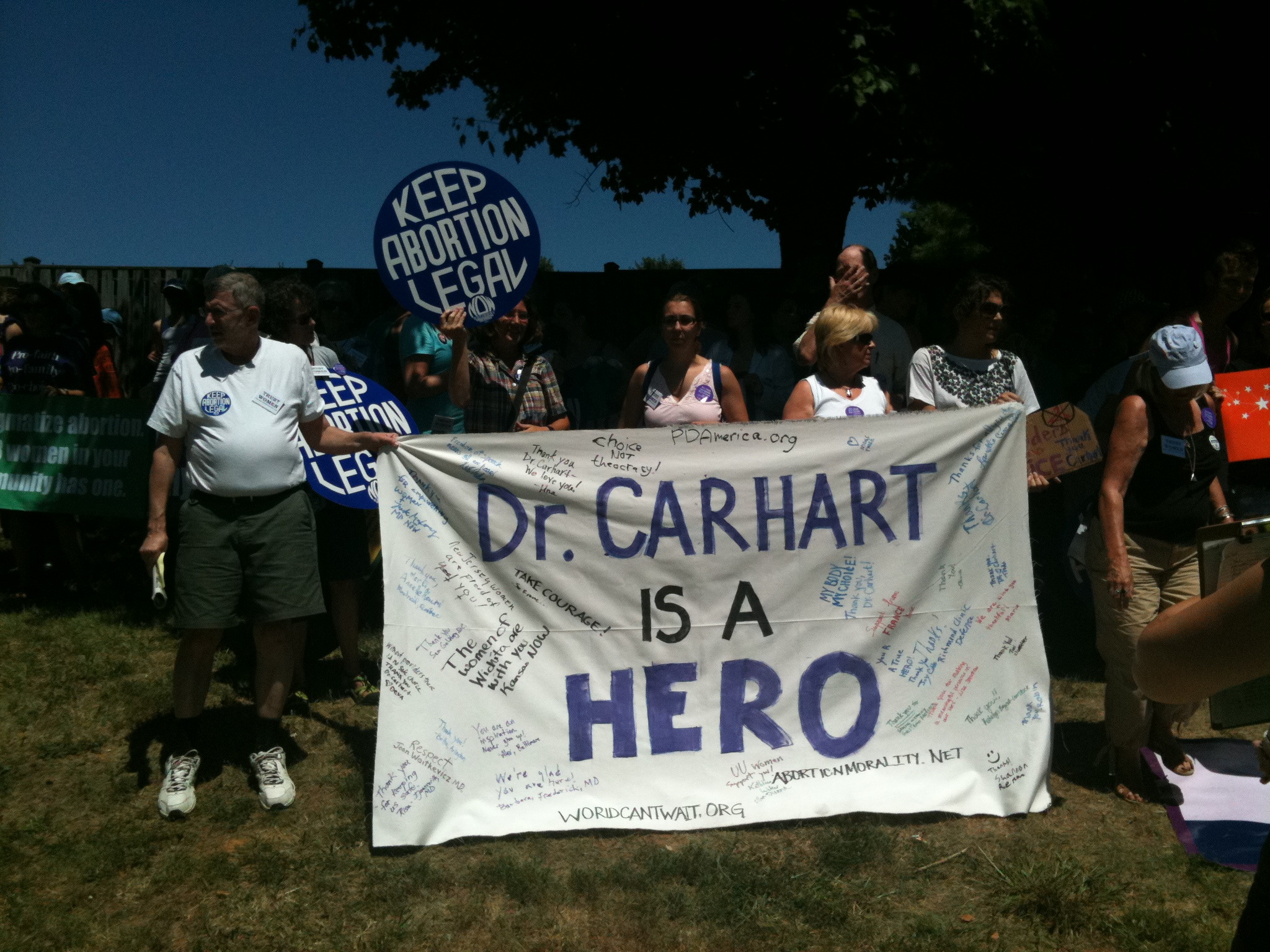

LeRoy Harrison Carhart (October 28, 1941 – April 28, 2023) was an American physician from New Jersey best known for performing abortions late in pregnancy. He was known for his participation in the Supreme Court cases Stenberg v. Carhart and Gonzales v. Carhart, both of which dealt with intact dilation and extraction. A former Republican, he was one of the four subjects of the 2013 documentary After Tiller.

== Biography ==
Carhart was born on October 28, 1941 in Trenton, New Jersey. He trained as a physician in the U.S. Air Force, and retired from the force with the rank of lieutenant colonel. He was a graduate of Rutgers University, and a 1973 graduate of Hahnemann University School of Medicine (now Drexel University College of Medicine).

=== Medical practice ===
After 21 years as a surgeon in the Air Force, Carhart opened a walk-in emergency clinic in Omaha in 1985. On September 6, 1991, the day of the passage of the Nebraska Parental Notification Law, arsonists targeted Carhart's farm, setting fire to his home and a 48-stall barn, along with two other buildings and numerous vehicles. The attack killed two family pets and 21 horses. The fire, which had started in seven different locations on Carhart's property, was never declared arson and no one was prosecuted. Carhart stated that he received a note the morning after the fire claiming responsibility and likening the deaths of his animals to the "murder of children". At the time of the fire, abortions had been a small part of Carhart's surgical practice; afterwards, determined not to "cede a victory to the antis", Carhart began performing abortions full-time.

In February 2013, a 29-year-old woman who had been 33 weeks pregnant with a medically abnormal fetus died a day after a four-day abortion procedure at Carhart's clinic in Germantown. The medical examiner listed the causes of death as "amniotic fluid embolism following a medical termination of pregnancy", disseminated intravascular coagulation and fetal abnormalities. The Maryland Board of Physicians found that Carhart was not responsible for the death. The board's letter followed an investigation by state health officials that reported there were "no deficiencies" in Carhart's handling of the situation, and that the death could have happened during birth as well.

=== Court cases ===
Carhart filed suit against the Nebraska Attorney General, Don Stenberg, because a Nebraska law banned a form of abortion, dilation and extraction (D&X). In Stenberg v. Carhart the United States Supreme Court struck down the Nebraska law with Sandra Day O'Connor providing the swing vote for the five-to-four decision because the law did not allow for the use of the procedure even when the mother's health would be put at greater risk by another abortion procedure.

Carhart later filed suit against U.S. Attorney General Alberto Gonzales in Gonzales v. Carhart seeking to strike down the 2003 Partial-Birth Abortion Ban Act, a federal law that is similar to the state law struck down in Stenberg. While the Court did not officially reverse Stenberg, it upheld the federal ban as not imposing an undue burden on women, the test established in Planned Parenthood v. Casey. O'Connor's successor, Samuel Alito, along with William Rehnquist's successor, John G. Roberts, sided with three of the four Justices who dissented in Stenberg, creating a five-to-four majority.

== Personal life and death ==
In 1964, Carhart married his high school sweetheart Mary Clark. He was a Methodist, who had considered being a Lutheran minister as a young man, and a registered Republican. His wife described Carhart as being "stubborn, very stubborn."

Carhart died on April 28, 2023, at the age of 81, in Bellevue, Nebraska. He died from an aggressive form of liver cancer, according to his daughter, Janine Weathersby.
