= Partial-Birth Abortion Ban Act of 1995 =

United States proposed federal abortion legislation

Legislative history
- Introduced in the House by Charles T. Canady (R-FL) on June 14, 1995; Passed the House on November 1, 1995 (288-139); Passed the Senate on December 7, 1995 (54-44) with amendment; House agreed to Senate amendment on March 27, 1996 (286-129); Vetoed by President Bill Clinton on April 10, 1996; Overridden by the House on September 19, 1996 (285-137)

The Partial-Birth Abortion Ban Act was a bill introduced in the Congress of the United States in 1995 by Florida Representative Charles T. Canady which prohibited intact dilation and extraction, sometimes referred to as partial-birth abortion, which the bill described as "an abortion in which the person performing the abortion partially vaginally delivers a living fetus before killing the fetus and completing the delivery". In other words, the bill sought to eliminate abortion in the third trimester. The term "partial-birth abortion," coined by Canady, has never been recognized by the American Medical Association or the American Congress of Obstetricians and Gynecologists. In November 1995, the House of Representatives passed the bill. Doctors convicted under the bill would receive a fine and up to a two-year prison sentence. The bill was passed by both chambers of Congress, but then vetoed by President Bill Clinton.

Opponents of the bill argued that D & X procedures only occurred in the case of severe fetal defects or when carrying the birth to term endangered the life of the mother; its advocates argued that the majority were for purely elective reasons. These competing arguments both had some basis in truth but came from different classifications of D & X procedures; anti-Ban activists based their numbers solely on post-viability abortions, ignoring that pre-viability abortions account for more than 90 percent of D & X procedures. The use of the term "elective" by pro-Ban activists, on the other hand, completely overlooked the contextual factors such as youth, trauma, and poverty, that push women to choose D & X.

The House overrode President Clinton's 1996 veto, but the Senate was several votes short of the required 2/3 requirement with a margin of 58 yeas to 40 nays. The Republican-controlled Congress tried to push a similar ban in January 1997 with House Resolution 1122, but again its efforts were defeated by President Clinton's veto. A similar bill was later passed in 2003 as the Partial-Birth Abortion Ban Act, signed into law by President George W. Bush.

== See also ==
- Partial-Birth Abortion Ban Act of 2003
- Gonzales v. Carhart
