= Warren Hern =

American physician

Warren Martin Hern (born 1938) is an American physician best known for performing late terminations of pregnancy. In 1973, he founded Boulder Abortion Clinic in Boulder, Colorado. Hern was a founding member of the National Abortion Federation, and authored Abortion Practice, a comprehensive text on operating and evaluating abortion facilities. He and doctors LeRoy Carhart, Shelley Sella, and Susan Robinson were the subject of the 2013 documentary After Tiller about the four providers openly advertising later abortions in the United States after the 2009 assassination of George Tiller.

== Background ==
Hern earned his B.A. at the University of Colorado in 1961. He triple-majored in speech, anthropology, and chemistry. He received his M.D. from the University of Colorado School of Medicine in 1965, after which he served as a Peace Corps doctor in northeast Brazil for four years. He earned his M.P.H. degree at the University of North Carolina School of Public Health in 1971, and his Ph.D. in epidemiology from the same school in 1988.

He has been board certified in Preventive Medicine since 1978.

In 1973, Hern was asked to help found a private, non-profit abortion clinic in Boulder, Colorado. After his position was eliminated, Hern entered into private practice, creating the Boulder Abortion Clinic in 1975.

On January 22, 2025, on the fiftieth anniversary of opening his own private clinic, Hern retired from practicing medicine. His practice will continue to offer late-term abortion services.

== Academic appointments ==
Hern holds the following academic appointments

- Professor Adjunct, Department of Anthropology, University of Colorado, Boulder
- Associate Professor Adjunct, Department of Anthropology and Sociology, University of Colorado Denver
- Assistant Clinical Professor, Department of Obstetrics Gynecology
- Associate Clinical Professor, Department of Family Practice
- Associate Clinical Professor, Department of Preventive Medicine and Biometrics: University of Colorado Health Sciences Center

== Non-abortion work ==
Hern travels regularly to Peru, where he works as a volunteer providing medical care to the Shipibo tribe.

=== Environmentalism ===
In a 1990 article titled "Why are there so many of us? Description and diagnosis of a planetary ecopathological process", published in the journal Population and Environment, Hern wrote:

In this respect, the human species is an example of a malignant eco-tumor, an uncontrolled proliferation of a single species that threatens the existence of other species in their habitats.

I propose that the new scientific name of the human species be homo ecophagus... "the man who devours the ecosystem."

The new human species, homo ecophagus, is a ubiquitous, predatory, omniecophagic species that is a malignant epiecopathologic process engaged in the conversion of all planetary material into human biomass or its support system with coincident terminal derangement of the global ecosystem.

== Violence against Hern and his clinic ==
Hern's clinic has been the target of numerous vandalisms and threats, including gunshots fired through his office window. He has been stalked and threatened. His family has been threatened as well.

== Solidarity with George Tiller ==
Hern expressed outrage over the May 31, 2009 killing of George Tiller, a doctor who offered similar services, in Wichita. In the aftermath of Tiller's murder, Hern's clinic has continued to receive threats.

== Published works ==
- Hern, Warren M. (1984). Abortion Practice. J. B. Lippincott. p. 340. ISBN 978-0-9625728-0-7. Because of anti-abortion threats and harassment, Lippincott took the book out of print in 1989 and destroyed several hundred copies of the hardcover edition. Dr. Hern subsequently obtained the copyright, formed a publishing company (Alpenglo Graphics), and published a soft cover edition of Abortion Practice in order to keep the book available to those who need it.
- Hern, Warren M. (2024). Abortion in the Age of Unreason: A Doctor's Account of Caring for Women Before and After Roe V. Wade. Routledge. ISBN 9781032847856.
