= Martin Haskell =

American physician (born 1946)

William Mudd Martin Haskell (born 1946) is an American physician who, in 1992, described an abortion procedure known clinically as intact dilation and extraction (D&X), and popularly by the controversial, non-medical, non-technical term "partial-birth abortion".

Haskell was not the first physician to perform intact dilation and extraction. However, Haskell's 1992 presentation to the National Abortion Federation Risk Management Seminar in Dallas was the first detailed presentation of the technique.

Haskell's paper was obtained by the anti-abortion movement within weeks, and served as a catalyst for congressional hearings, federal legislation, multiple lawsuits, and more than thirty state bills prohibiting "partial-birth abortion". Newsweek reported that the director of the National Right to Life Committee could "hardly believe his luck" when he received an anonymously delivered copy of Haskell's paper, given its potential as a wedge issue. According to Harper's, the furor was in no small part due to an article in Life Advocate magazine by abortion opponent Jenny Westberg, who independently ordered National Abortion Federation literature containing Haskell's paper, wrote an article and illustrated the procedure with a series of pen-and-ink drawings. The drawings, which were "gruesome but not gory", and "made D&X compelling to look at for the very reason Martin Haskell had wanted to tell his colleagues about it: the fetus was intact", would later be distributed in numerous anti-abortion publications, brochures, and newspaper advertisements.
