= Thad Carhart =

American writer (born 1950)

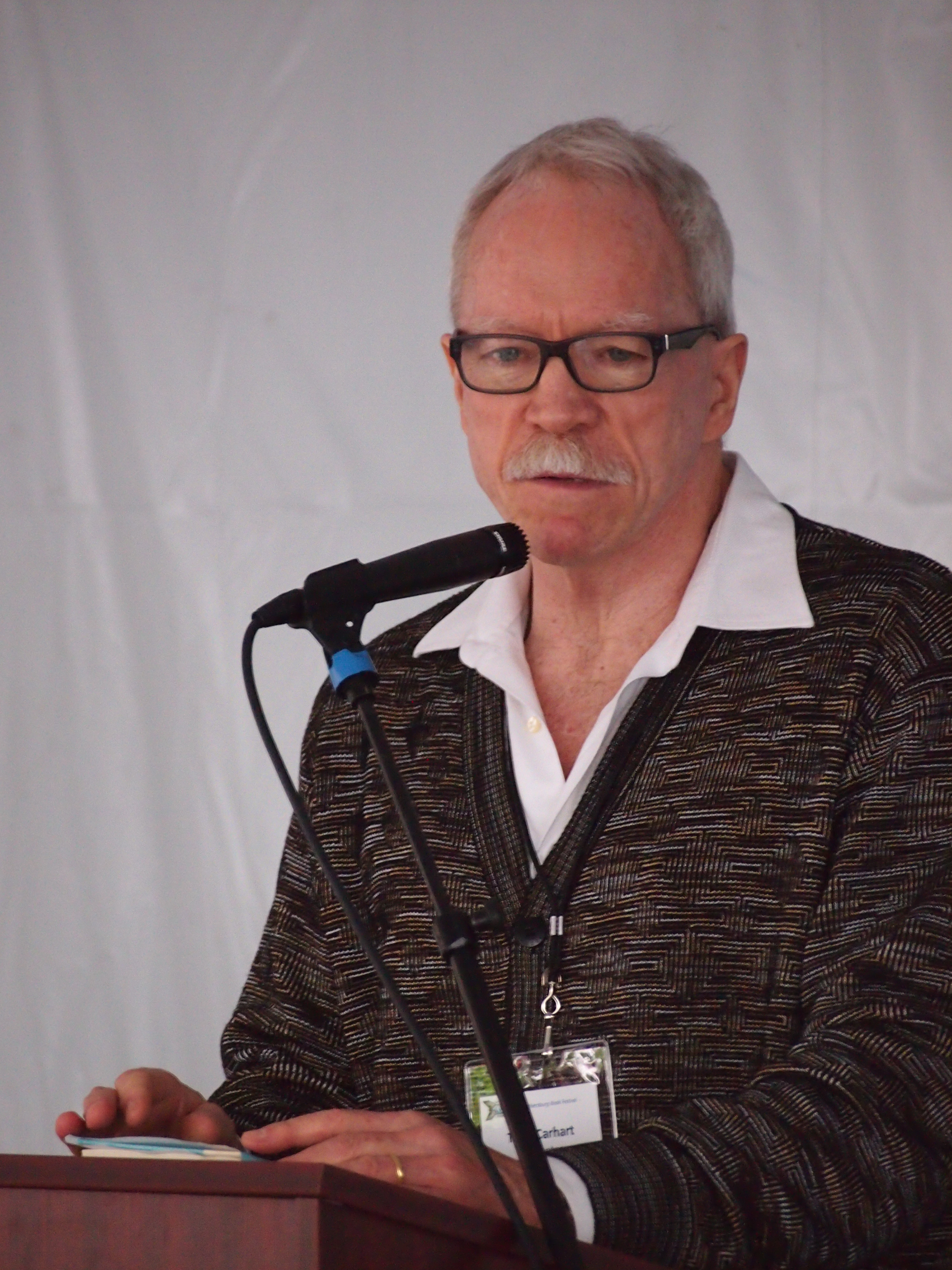
- Carhart at the Gaithersburg Book Festival
- Born: Thaddeus Edward Carhart; February 16, 1950 (age 76); Tuscaloosa, Alabama, U.S.
- Occupation: Writer
- Notable work: The Piano Shop on the Left Bank
- Children: 2

Thaddeus Edward Carhart (born February 16, 1950) is an American writer. He is the author of bestseller The Piano Shop on the Left Bank, a memoir of his experiences with pianos and his time spent in a Parisian piano atelier. His book Across the Endless River is a historical novel about Jean-Baptiste Charbonneau, the son of Sacagawea, and his intriguing sojourn as a young man in 1820s Europe.

== Early life and education ==
Thaddeus Edward Carhart was born in 1950 at Tuscaloosa, Alabama to Air Force Major Thomas M. Carhart and May [Welch] Carhart, and lived in numerous locations while growing up. He graduated with a degree in Anthropology from Yale University and also worked as an interpreter for the State Department. He pursued graduate studies at Stanford University.

== Personal life ==
At the time of this writing, Thad Carhart resides in Paris with his wife and two children.

== Writing inspiration ==
Thad Carhart describes his writing interest as being in the mid-1820s Europe.

== Bibliography ==
- Carhart, Thad (2016). Finding Fontainebleau : an American boy in France. Viking. ISBN 978-0525428800.
- Carhart, Thad (2009). Across the Endless River (Hardcover). Doubleday. ISBN 978-0-385-52977-8.
- Carhart, Thad (2001). The Piano Shop on the Left Bank: Discovering a Forgotten Passion in a Paris Atelier. Random House. ISBN 978-0375758621.
