= Intact dilation and extraction =

Surgical procedure to remove a fetus from the uterus

- IDX, intact D&X, et al.

Background
- Abortion type: Surgical
- First use: 1983; 43 years ago
- Gestation: >16 weeks

Intact dilation and extraction (D&X, IDX, or intact D&E) is a surgical procedure that terminates and removes an intact fetus from the uterus. The procedure is used both after miscarriages and for abortions in the second and third trimesters of pregnancy. When used to perform an abortion, an intact D&E can occur after feticide or on a live fetus.

In the United States, where federal law describes an intact D&E on a live fetus as a partial-birth abortion, the procedure is uncommon. The 2003 federal Partial-Birth Abortion Ban Act, which was upheld by the Supreme Court of the United States in the case of Gonzales v. Carhart, outlaws an intact D&E of a fetus with a heartbeat under most, though not all, circumstances.

== Indications ==
As with non-intact D&E or labor induction in the second trimester, the purpose of D&E is to end a pregnancy by removing the fetus and placenta. Patients who have a fetus diagnosed with severe congenital anomalies may prefer an intact procedure to allow for viewing of the remains, grieving, and achieving closure. In cases where an autopsy has been requested, an intact procedure allows for a more complete examination of the body.

An intact D&E is also used in abortions to minimize the passage of instruments into the uterus, reducing the risk of trauma. It also reduces the risk of cervical lacerations that may be caused by the removal of bony parts from the uterus and the risk of retention of fetal parts in the uterus such as brain matter and tissue.

== Procedure ==
As with non-intact D&E, intact D&E may be performed in freestanding clinics, ambulatory surgical centers, and in hospitals. Intra-operative pain control is usually dependent on the setting and patient characteristics but commonly involves local analgesia with either IV sedation or general anesthesia. Preoperative antibiotics are administered to reduce the risk of infection. In cases where the woman is Rh-negative, Rho(D) immunoglobulin (RhoGam) is administered to prevent the risk of developing erythroblastosis fetalis (hemolytic disease of the newborn) in subsequent pregnancies. Intact D&E is more feasible among women with higher parity, at higher gestational ages, and when cervical dilation is greater. There are no absolute contraindications.

=== Cervical preparation ===
The surgery is preceded by cervical preparation, which may take several days. Osmotic dilators, natural or synthetic rods that absorb moisture from the cervix, are placed in the cervix and mechanically dilate the cervix over the course of hours to days. Misoprostol can be used to soften the cervix further. Intact D&E can only be performed with 2–5 centimeters of cervical dilation.

=== Fetal termination ===
Fetal injection of digoxin or potassium chloride may be administered at the beginning of the procedure to allow for softening of the fetal bones or to comply with relevant laws in the physician's jurisdiction and the U.S. federal Partial-Birth Abortion Ban Act. Umbilical cord transection can also be used to induce fetal demise prior to removal.

=== Removal of fetus and placenta ===
During the surgery, the fetus is removed from the uterus in the breech position. If the fetal presentation is not breech, forceps or manual manipulation can be used to turn it to a breech presentation while in the uterus (internal version). The fetal skull is usually the largest part of the fetal body and its removal may require mechanical collapse if it is too large to fit through the cervical canal. Decompression of the skull can be accomplished by incision and suction of the brain or by using forceps to collapse the skull.

== Recovery ==
Recovery from an intact D&E is similar to recovery from a non-intact D&E. Postoperative pain is usually minimal and managed with NSAIDs. In cases of uterine atony and corresponding blood loss, methergine or misoprostol can be given to encourage uterine contraction and achieve hemostasis. Patients who have recently undergone an intact D&E are monitored for signs of coagulopathy, uterine perforation, uterine atony, retained tissue, or hemorrhage.

== Complications ==
The risks of intact D&E are similar to the risks of non-intact D&E and include postoperative infection, hemorrhage, or uterine injury. Overall, the complication rate is low, with rates of serious complications (those requiring blood transfusion, surgery, or hospital treatment) ranging from 0 per 1,000 cases to 2.94 per 1,000 cases. The rate of minor complications is approximately 50 in 1,000 (5%), the same as the minor complication rate for non-intact D&E; the rate of serious complications is higher in non-intact D&E.

Data directly comparing the safety of non-intact to intact D&E are limited. There is no difference in postoperative blood loss or major complications when compared to non-intact D&E. There is no difference in risk of subsequent preterm delivery. The risk of retained tissue is lower since the fetus is removed intact.

In some cases, the physician may not be able to remove the fetus intact due to anatomical limitations. This may present a psychological problem for the patient who wishes to view the remains, or make a comprehensive autopsy impossible, precluding an accurate postmortem diagnosis of fetal anomalies.

== Society and culture ==
=== United States politics ===
The term "partial-birth abortion" is primarily used in political discourse—chiefly regarding the legality of abortion in the United States. The term is not recognized as a medical term by the American Medical Association nor the American College of Obstetricians and Gynecologists. This term was first suggested in 1995 by Congressman Charles T. Canady, while developing the original proposed Partial-Birth Abortion Ban. According to Keri Folmar, the lawyer responsible for the bill's language, the term was developed in early 1995 in a meeting among herself, Charles T. Canady, and National Right to Life Committee lobbyist Douglas Johnson. Canady could not find this particular abortion practice named in any medical textbook, and therefore he and his aides named it. "Partial-birth abortion" was first used in the media on June 4, 1995, in a Washington Times article covering the bill.

In the U.S., a federal statute defines "partial-birth abortion" as any abortion in which the life of the fetus is terminated after having been extracted from the mother's body to a point "past the navel [of the fetus]" or "in the case of head-first presentation, the entire fetal head is outside the body of the mother" at the time the life is terminated. The U.S. Supreme Court has held that the terms "partial-birth abortion" and "intact dilation and extraction" are basically synonymous. However, there are cases where these overlapping terms do not coincide. For example, the intact D&E procedure may be used to remove a deceased fetus (e.g., due to a miscarriage or feticide) that is developed enough to require dilation of the cervix for its extraction. Removing a dead fetus does not meet the federal legal definition of "partial-birth abortion," which specifies that partial live delivery must precede "the overt act, other than completion of delivery, that kills the partially delivered, living fetus."

In addition to the federal ban, there have also been a number of state partial-birth abortion bans. There, courts have found that state legislation (rather than federal legislation) intended to ban "partial-birth abortions" could be interpreted to apply to some non-intact dilation and evacuation (D&E) procedures. Non-intact D&E, though performed at similar gestational ages, is a fundamentally different procedure.

=== Controversy ===
Some people believe the D&E procedure illustrates that abortion, and especially late-term abortion, is the taking of a human life and therefore ought to be illegal. People who believe this consider the procedure to be infanticide, a position that many in the anti-abortion movement extend to cover all abortions. Some advocates, both for and against abortion rights, see the intact D&E issue as a central battleground in the wider abortion debate, attempting to set a legal precedent so as to either gradually reduce or gradually increase access to all abortion methods.

Dr. Martin Haskell has called the intact D&E procedure "a quick, surgical outpatient method" for late second-trimester and early third-trimester abortions. The Partial-Birth Abortion Ban Act of 2003 describes it as "a gruesome and inhumane procedure that is never medically necessary."

According to a BBC report about the U.S. Supreme Court's decision in Gonzales v. Carhart, "government lawyers and others who favour the ban, have said there are alternative and more widely used procedures that are still legal - which involves dismembering the fetus in the uterus." An article in Harper's magazine stated that, "Defending the Partial-Birth Abortion Ban... requires arguing to judges that pulling a fetus from a woman's body in dismembered pieces is legal, medically acceptable, and safe; but that pulling a fetus out intact, so that if the woman wishes the fetus can be wrapped in a blanket and handed to her, is appropriately punishable by a fine, or up to two years' imprisonment, or both." Alternately, opponents of abortion rights frame the issue as one in which a partially-born infant's life is disposable, whereas pulling the infant only a few more inches down the birth canal automatically transforms it into "a living person, possessing rights and deserving of protection." The U.S. Supreme Court has stated that intact D&E remains legal as long as there is first a feticidal injection while the fetus is still completely inside of the mother's body.

There is also controversy about why this procedure is used. Although prominent defenders of the method asserted during 1995 and 1996 that it was used only or mostly in acute medical circumstances, lobbyist Ron Fitzsimmons, executive director of the National Coalition of Abortion Providers (a trade association of abortion providers), told The New York Times (February 26, 1997): "In the vast majority of cases, the procedure is performed on a healthy mother with a healthy fetus that is 20 weeks or more along." Some prominent opponents of abortion rights quickly defended the accuracy of Fitzsimmons's statements, whilst others condemned Fitzsimmons as self-serving.

In support of the Partial-Birth Abortion Ban Act, a nurse who witnessed three intact D&E procedures found them deeply disturbing, and described one performed on a 26½-week fetus with Down syndrome in testimony before a Judiciary subcommittee of the U.S. House of Representatives.

A journalist observed three intact and two non-intact D&E procedures involving fetuses ranging from 19 to 23 weeks. She "watched for any signs of fetal distress, but ... [she] could see no response, no reflexive spasm, nothing. Whether this was a result of the anesthesia or an undeveloped fetal system for pain sensitivity, one thing was clear: There was no discernible response by the fetus."

Abortion provider Warren Hern asserted in 2003, "No peer-reviewed articles or case reports have ever been published describing anything such as 'partial-birth' abortion, 'Intact D&E' (for 'dilation and extraction'), or any of its synonyms." Therefore, Hern expressed uncertainty about what all of these terms mean. The U.S. Supreme Court held in Gonzales v. Carhart that these terms of the federal statute are not vague because the statute specifically detailed the procedure being banned: it specified anatomical landmarks past which the fetus must not be delivered, and criminalized such a procedure only if an "overt" fatal act is performed on the fetus after "partial delivery."

=== Legality in the United States ===
==== Federal law ====
Since 1995, led by Republicans in Congress, the U.S. House of Representatives and U.S. Senate have moved several times to pass measures banning the procedure. Congress passed two such measures by wide margins during Bill Clinton's presidency, but Clinton vetoed those bills in April 1996 and October 1997 on the grounds that they did not include health exceptions. Subsequent congressional attempts at overriding the veto were unsuccessful.

A major part of the legal battle over banning the procedure relates to health exceptions, which would permit the procedure in special circumstances. The 1973 Supreme Court decision Roe v. Wade, which declared many state-level abortion restrictions unconstitutional, allowed states to ban abortions of post-viable fetuses unless an abortion was "necessary to preserve the life or health of the mother." The companion ruling, Doe v. Bolton, upheld against a vagueness challenge a state law that defined health to include mental as well as physical health. The Court has never explicitly held, as a matter of constitutional law, that states have to allow abortions of post-viable fetuses if doing so is necessary for the woman's mental health, but many read Doe as implying as much. The concern that the health exception can be read so liberally partly explains why supporters of the Partial-Birth Abortion Ban Act did not want to include one.

In 2003, the Partial-Birth Abortion Ban Act (H.R. 760, S. 3) was signed into law; the House passed it on October 2 with a vote of 281–142, the Senate passed it on October 21 with a vote of 64–34, and President George W. Bush signed it into law on November 5.

Beginning in early 2004, the Planned Parenthood Federation of America, the National Abortion Federation, and abortion doctors in Nebraska challenged the ban in federal district courts in the Northern District of California, Southern District of New York, and District of Nebraska. All three district courts ruled the ban unconstitutional that same year. Their respective federal courts of appeals—the Ninth Circuit, Second Circuit, and Eighth Circuit, respectively—affirmed these rulings on appeal.

The three cases were all appealed to the U.S. Supreme Court, and were consolidated into the case Gonzales v. Carhart. On April 18, 2007, the Supreme Court voted to uphold the Partial-Birth Abortion Ban Act by a decision of 5–4. Justice Kennedy wrote for the majority and was joined by Justices Thomas, Scalia, Alito, and Chief Justice Roberts. A dissenting opinion was written by Justice Ginsburg and joined by Justices Stevens, Souter and Breyer.

==== State law ====
Many states have bans on late-term abortions which apply to intact D&E if it is performed after fetal viability.

Many states have also passed bans specifically on intact D&E. The first was Ohio, which in 1995 enacted a law that referred to the procedure as dilation and extraction. In 1997, the United States Court of Appeals for the Sixth Circuit found the law unconstitutional on the grounds that it placed a substantial and unconstitutional obstacle in the path of women seeking pre-viability abortions in the second trimester.

Between 1995 and 2000, 28 more states passed Partial-Birth Abortion bans, all similar to the proposed federal bans and all lacking an exemption for the health of the woman. Many of these state laws faced legal challenges, with Nebraska's the first to reach decision in Stenberg v. Carhart. The Federal District Court held Nebraska's statute unconstitutional on two counts. One being the bill's language was too broad, potentially rendering a range of abortion procedures illegal, and thus, creating an undue burden on a woman's ability to choose. The other count was the bill failed to provide a necessary exception for the health of the woman. The decision was appealed to and affirmed by both the Eighth Circuit and the Supreme Court in June 2000, thus resolving the legal challenges to similar state bans nationwide.

Since the Stenberg v. Carhart decision, Virginia, Michigan, and Utah have adopted legislation very similar to the Nebraska law overturned as unconstitutional. The Michigan law was similarly struck down for broadness and failure to provide a health exemption. Utah's law remains on the books, pending trial, but is unenforceable under a court-ordered preliminary injunction. Virginia's Law was initially ruled invalid, but was reversed and remanded to the District Court in the wake of the Gonzales v. Carhart decision, where it was upheld as constitutional. This is despite the fact the Virginia law criminalizes abortions for accidental or intentional intact D&E.

In 2000, Ohio introduced another "partial-birth abortion" ban. The law differed from previous attempts at the ban in that it specifically excluded D&E procedures, while also providing a narrow health exception. This law was upheld on appeal to the Sixth Circuit in 2003 on the grounds that "it permitted the partial birth procedure when necessary to prevent significant health risks."

In 2003, the Michigan Senate introduced Senate Bill No. 395, which would have changed the definition of birth and therefore effectively ban intact D&E. The definition of birth as defined in the bill was that once any part of the body had passed beyond the introitus, it is considered a birth. The bill included an exemption for the mother's health. The bill was passed by both the Senate and House of Representatives but was vetoed by governor Jennifer Granholm.

==== Clinical response to legal bans on the procedure ====
Since the passage of the Partial-Birth Abortion Ban Act in the United States and similar state laws, providers of later abortions typically induce and document fetal death before beginning any later abortion procedure. Since the bans only apply to abortions of living fetuses, this protects the abortion providers from prosecution. The most common method of inducing fetal demise is to inject digoxin intrafetally or potassium chloride intrathoracically.

=== In other countries ===
Questioned about the policy of the UK government on the issue in Parliament, Baroness Andrews stated that:

We are not aware of the procedure referred to as "partial-birth abortion" being used in Great Britain. It is the Royal College of Obstetricians and Gynaecologists' (RCOG) belief that this method of abortion is never used as a primary or pro-active technique and is only ever likely to be performed in unforeseen circumstances in order to reduce maternal mortality or severe morbidity.
