= Edith Beebe Carhart =

American librarian (1879–1964)

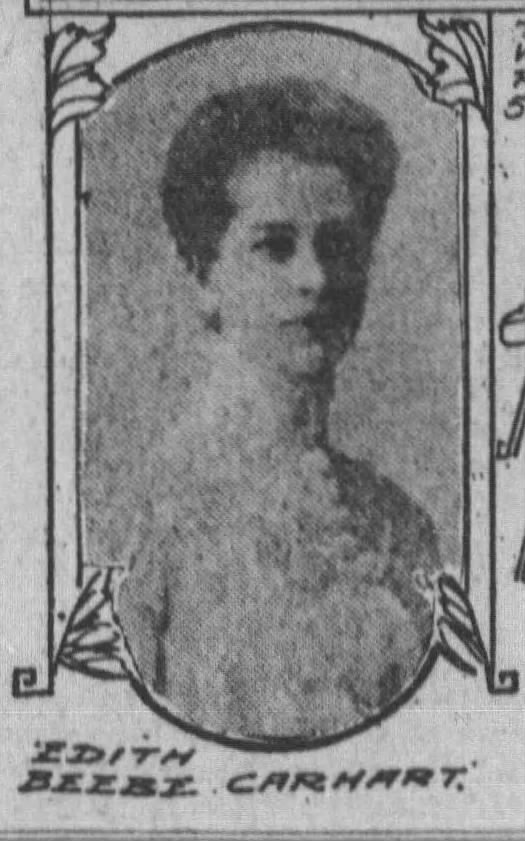
- Carhart in 1909
- Born: April 14, 1879; Terre Haute, Indiana, U.S.
- Died: April 1, 1964 (aged 84); Bellingham, Washington, U.S.
- Resting place: Bayview Cemetery, Bellingham, Washington, U.S.
- Education: North Dakota State Teachers College
- Occupation: Librarian
- Parent(s): Joseph Carhart; Ida Beebe Clark

Edith Beebe Carhart (April 14, 1879 – April 1, 1964) was the City Librarian in Bellingham, Washington, and compiled the "History of Bellingham".

== Early life ==
Edith Beebe Carhart was born on April 14, 1879, in Terre Haute, Indiana, the daughter of Dr. Joseph Carhart (1849–1926) and Ida Beebe Clark (1852–1914).

She graduated from North Dakota State Teachers College and received private training in library work.

== Career ==
Carhart taught school in Backfoot, Dakota, where she met two other teachers: Mabel Zimmerman and Nelle McCormick. The three of them became friendly, and decided that they would continue to try and teach together. Carhart and her friends then successfully applied for teaching positions in Wrangell, Alaska, and moved there in 1909.

Edith Beebe Carhart was the principal of grade schools in Alaska, Oregon and Washington.

She was the Librarian and Manager of the Boarding Department of the State Teacher's College at Mayville, North Dakota, for five years and city librarian in Bellingham for more than 16 years.

Later in life she entered the real estate and insurance business.

She compiled a History of Bellingham (1926). She wrote The Angora Wool Rabbit: A Manual for the Beginner (Miller & Sutherlen printing Company, 1930).

== Personal life ==
Edith Beebe Carhart moved to Washington in 1916 and lived at 2727 Eldridge, Bellingham, Washington.

She died at the age of 84 on April 1, 1964, in Bellingham, Washington. She was buried in Bayview Cemetery, Bellingham.
