= Stenberg v. Carhart =

- Supreme Court of the United States

Argued April 25, 2000 Decided June 29, 2000
- Full case name: Don Stenberg, Attorney General of Nebraska, et al. v. LeRoy Carhart
- Docket no.: 99-830
- Citations: 530 U.S. 914 (more) 120 S. Ct. 2597; 147 L. Ed. 2d 743; 2000 U.S. LEXIS 4484;68 U.S.L.W. 4702; 2000 Cal. Daily Op. Service 5252; 2000 Daily Journal DAR 6977; 2000 Colo. J. C.A.R. 3802; 13 Fla. L. Weekly Fed. S 496

Case history
- Prior: Judgment for plaintiff, 11 F. Supp. 2d 1099 (D. Neb. 1998); affirmed, 192 F.3d 1142 (8th Cir. 1999); cert. granted, 528 U.S. 1110 (2000).

Holding
- Laws banning partial-birth abortion are unconstitutional if they do not make an exception for the woman's health, or if they cannot be reasonably construed to apply only to the partial-birth abortion (intact D&X) procedure and not to other abortion methods.

Court membership
- Chief Justice William Rehnquist Associate Justices John P. Stevens · Sandra Day O'Connor; Antonin Scalia · Anthony Kennedy; David Souter · Clarence Thomas; Ruth Bader Ginsburg · Stephen Breyer

Case opinions
- Majority: Breyer, joined by Stevens, O'Connor, Souter, Ginsburg
- Concurrence: Stevens, joined by Ginsburg
- Concurrence: O'Connor
- Concurrence: Ginsburg, joined by Stevens
- Dissent: Rehnquist
- Dissent: Scalia
- Dissent: Kennedy, joined by Rehnquist
- Dissent: Thomas, joined by Rehnquist, Scalia

Laws applied
- U.S. Const. amend. XIV; Neb. Rev. Stat. Ann. §28—328
- Superseded by
- Dobbs v. Jackson Women's Health Organization (2022)

Stenberg v. Carhart, 530 U.S. 914 (2000), was a landmark decision of the United States Supreme Court dealing with a Nebraska law which made performing "partial-birth abortion" illegal, without regard for the health of the mother. Nebraska physicians who performed the procedure contrary to the law were subject to having their medical licenses revoked. The Court struck down the law, finding the Nebraska statute criminalizing "partial birth abortion[s]" violated the Due Process Clause of the United States Constitution, as interpreted in Planned Parenthood v. Casey and Roe v. Wade.

The Court would later uphold a similar, albeit federal statute, in Gonzales v. Carhart (2007).

== History ==
LeRoy Carhart, a Nebraska physician who specialized in late-term abortions, brought suit against Don Stenberg, the Attorney General of Nebraska, seeking declaratory judgment that a state law banning certain forms of abortion was unconstitutional, based on the undue burden test mentioned by a dissenting opinion in Akron v. Akron Center for Reproductive Health and by the Court in Planned Parenthood v. Casey. Both a federal district court and the U.S. Court of Appeals ruled in favor of Carhart before the case was appealed to the Supreme Court.

The Nebraska statute prohibited "partial birth abortion", which it defined as any abortion in which the physician "partially delivers vaginally a living unborn child before killing the unborn child and completing the delivery." The most common type of abortion performed is suction-aspiration abortion which consists of a vacuum tube inserted into the uterus; others consist of what is known as "D&E" (dilation and evacuation), which is usually used during the second trimester because of the increased size of the fetus. The procedure dilates the cervix, dismembers the fetus, and then removes the body parts with non-vacuum instruments, and, in some cases, uses curettage inside the uterus so that the remaining fetus can be evacuated. Dr. Carhart wanted to use a modified version of this called "D&X" (Dilation and Extraction), which, rather than commencing curettage inside the uterus, extracts part of the fetus first and then begins the process of dismemberment. Carhart stated that he wanted to perform this procedure because he believed it would be safer and would involve fewer risks for the women; it lowered the risk of leaving potentially harmful fetal tissue in the uterus, and it minimized the number of instruments physicians needed to use.

Experts in fetal development provide markedly different assessments of the kind and degree of pain (if any) experienced by the fetus (see Fetal pain). Although in the second and third trimesters the nervous system is largely in place, the level of consciousness or awareness of the fetus is a matter of debate. Experiments aimed at measuring fetal pain have yielded results that are somewhat open to interpretation, given that measurable reactions of the fetus to stimuli may not correspond directly to an adult experience of pain.

The medical and scientific questions surrounding partial-birth abortion are impacted in the public arena by political and special interest considerations, resulting in a certain degree of media hype surrounding this case. Proponents of abortion rights on the one hand and those in opposition to abortion rights on the other both decry what they describe as myths regarding this procedure that have passed into mainstream American debate on the issue.

== U.S. Supreme Court ruling ==
The case was argued in 2000. The first issue was the lack of an exception for the woman's health. The state of Nebraska took the position that D&X abortions were never medically necessary, meaning that an exception was not needed. Secondly, it was inquired on whether or not the law could be construed to apply to other forms of abortion, in which case it would violate the "right to privacy" interpreted from the Constitution, as described in the Roe and Casey decisions. The law had never been certified to the Supreme Court of Nebraska, as it had been challenged two days after the law was passed.

=== Opinion of the court and concurring opinions ===
Justice Stephen Breyer, in writing the opinion of the Court, cited Planned Parenthood v. Casey and said that any abortion law that imposed an undue burden on a woman's "right to choose" (right to abortion) was unconstitutional. He said that causing those who procure abortions to "fear prosecution, conviction, and imprisonment" was an undue burden, and therefore declared the law to be against the Constitution. Justices John Paul Stevens, Ruth Bader Ginsburg, David Souter, and Sandra Day O'Connor all agreed that the law was unconstitutional, but Ginsburg wrote a separate opinion, as did O'Connor. Ginsburg stated plainly that a state could not force physicians to use procedures other than what they felt in their own judgment to be the safest, that this was part of the "life and liberty" protected under the Constitution. O'Connor agreed, saying that any such procedural law would have to be applied only to prevent unnecessary partial-birth abortions, and would have to include an exception for the health of the woman (as this law did not). Justice Stevens also filed a separate opinion. He noted that government had no right to force doctors to perform any procedure other than what they felt would be the safest.

=== Dissents ===
Justice Anthony Kennedy dissented. Kennedy claimed this type of law was allowed by their ruling in Planned Parenthood v. Casey, which allowed laws to preserve prenatal life to a certain extent. He called Sandra Day O'Connor's opinion a "repudiation" of the understandings and assurances given in Casey. Justice Kennedy also detailed what he deemed a constitutionally protected alternative to partial-birth abortion. In a short separate opinion, Chief Justice Rehnquist stated that he did not join Casey but felt that Justice Kennedy had applied its precedent correctly, and thus joined his opinion.

Justice Clarence Thomas read his dissent from the bench when the decision was announced, stating that abortion was not a right contained in the Constitution, and sharply criticized the majority and concurring opinions. Chief Justice William Rehnquist, along with Antonin Scalia, and Thomas had consistently said that they did not believe abortion is a protected right, and had pointed out that "privacy" is not explicitly mentioned in the Constitution. Thomas also pointed out in his dissenting opinion that even if abortion was a woman's right, the law in question was not designed to strike at the right itself. He reminded the others that many groups, including the American Medical Association, had concluded that partial-birth abortion was very different from other forms of abortion, and was often considered infanticide. Thomas further noted that the gruesome nature of some partial-birth abortions has caused personal trauma in the doctors performing them.

In his dissent, Justice Scalia recalled his prior dissent in Casey in which he had criticized the undue burden standard as "doubtful in application as it is unprincipled in origin." What constitutes an undue burden is a value judgment, argued Scalia; it should therefore be no surprise that the Court split on whether the Nebraska statute constitutes an undue burden. Scalia moreover chastised Kennedy for feeling betrayed by the majority. Scalia declared that the Stenberg decision was not "a regrettable misapplication of Casey,"—as Kennedy claimed—but "Casey's logical and entirely predictable consequence". Denouncing the undue burden standard of Casey as illegitimate, Scalia called for Casey to be overruled.

== Effects of the decision ==
By a 5–4 majority, the Nebraska law was struck down, as were all other state laws banning partial-birth abortion. Three years later, however, the federal government enacted a Partial-Birth Abortion Ban Act of 2003. This law did not include an exception for the health of the woman, as Justice O'Connor said it must. Congress inserted findings into the law saying that the procedure is never needed to protect maternal health. Although several federal judges struck down this federal law, citing the precedent of Stenberg v. Carhart, it was eventually upheld by the Supreme Court in Gonzales v. Carhart.
