= Late termination of pregnancy =

- Other names: Postviability abortion, third trimester abortion, induced termination of pregnancy (ITOP), late-term abortion
- Specialty: Obstetrics and gynecology
- ICD-10-PCS: O04
- ICD-9-CM: 779.6
- MeSH: D000028
- MedlinePlus: 002912

Late termination of pregnancy, also referred to as late-term abortion in political contexts, describes the termination of pregnancy by inducing labor during a late stage of gestation. In this context, late is not precisely defined, and different medical publications use varying gestational age thresholds. As of 2015, in the United States, more than 90% of abortions occur before the 13th week, 1.3% take place after the 21st week, and less than 1% occur after 24 weeks. While little data exists on abortions done after 26 weeks, one study from 1992 estimated the rate at 0.02%.

Reasons for late terminations of pregnancy include cases where a pregnant woman's health is at risk, when birth defects, such as lethal fetal abnormalities, have been detected, or when barriers to receiving abortion cause delays.

In the United States, the mortality rate for legal abortions overall is less than 1 in 100,000 procedures performed. The rate of mortality and morbidity increases with the gestational age of the fetus, so patients who have decided to have an abortion are strongly encouraged to get it early. Still, later abortion is not associated with any greater net negative physical or mental health outcomes (including mortality) than full-term pregnancy and childbirth in the United States.

Late termination of pregnancy is more controversial than abortion in general. All countries in Europe do not permit abortion later in pregnancy (after 10–14 weeks in most countries, 18 weeks in Sweden, Denmark and Iceland, and 24 weeks in the Netherlands and the United Kingdom) unless specific circumstances are present, generally when the pregnancy represents a serious danger to the life, or to the physical or mental health of the woman, or when a serious malformation or anomaly of the fetus is diagnosed.

== Definition ==
A late termination of pregnancy often refers to an induced ending of pregnancy after the 20th week of gestation, i.e. after a fetal age (time since conception) of about 18 weeks. The exact point when an abortion is considered late-term, however, is not clearly defined. In three articles published in 1998 in the same issue of the Journal of the American Medical Association (JAMA), two chose the 20th week of gestation and one chose the 28th week of gestation as the point where an abortion procedure would be considered late-term.

In the United States, the point at which an abortion becomes late-term is often related to fetal viability (ability of the fetus to survive outside the uterus). Thus, late-term abortions are sometimes referred to as post-viability abortions.

=== Viability ===
There is no sharp limit of development, age, or weight at which a fetus becomes viable. A 2015 study found that even with active treatment, no infants born at less than 22 weeks survived, but an infant born at 21 weeks and one day in April of 2021 did survive his premature birth. At 23 weeks survival without severe impairment is less than 2%, and at 25 weeks, up to 30% might survive without severe impairment. According to studies between 2003 and 2005, 20 to 35 percent of babies born at 24 weeks of gestation survived, while 50 to 70 percent of babies born at 25 weeks, and more than 90 percent born at 26 to 27 weeks, survived. Because the chance of survival is variable based on interventions available and the weight and sex of the fetus, there is no consensus on viability. The American College of Obstetricians and Gynecologists reports that 23% of abortion providers offer abortions at 20 weeks of gestation and later, most often using a method called dilation and evacuation (D&E).

== Incidence ==
Histogram of abortions by gestational age in England and Wales during 2019.

Abortion in the United States by gestational age, 2016. (Data source: Centers for Disease Control and Prevention)

- Australia: As of 2015, South Australia is the only Australian state or territory to keep reliable abortion statistics. During 2012, 92% of abortions were performed before 14 weeks' gestation, 6% between 14 and 20 weeks, and 2% (n=96) at a later stage. Of the 96 abortions carried out beyond 20 weeks, 53 were due to actual or probable fetal abnormality.
- Canada: During the year 2019, approximately 87% of abortions occurred by 12 weeks, with 1.17% occurring after 21 weeks.
- England and Wales: In 2015, 8% of abortions occurred after 12 weeks; 0.1% occurred at or over 24 weeks.
- New Zealand: In 2003, 2.03% of induced abortions were done between weeks 16 and 19, and 0.56% were done over 20 weeks.
- Norway: In 2005, 2.28% of induced abortions were performed between 13 and 16 weeks, 1.24% of abortions between 17 and 20 weeks, and 0.20% over 21 weeks. Between February 15, 2010, and December 1, 2011, a total number of ten abortions were performed between 22 and 24 weeks. These have been declared illegal by The Norwegian Directorate of Health. Women who seek an abortion after the 12-week time limit must apply to a special medical assessment board – called an "abortion board" (Norwegian: abortnemnd or primærnemnd) – that will determine whether or not to grant them an abortion.
- Scotland: In 2005, 6.1% of abortions were done between 14 and 17 weeks, while 1.6% were performed over 18 weeks.
- Sweden: In 2005, 5.6% of abortions were carried out between 12 and 17 weeks, and 0.8% at or greater than 18 weeks.
- Switzerland: In 2016, 10% of abortions performed after the legal term were carried out after week 21 (a total of 36 cases). Of these cases 86% were carried out due to physical problems with the child or mother.
- United States: In 2003, from data collected in those areas that sufficiently reported gestational age, it was found that 6.2% of abortions were conducted between 13 and 15 weeks, 4.2% between 16 and 20 weeks, and 1.4% at or after 21 weeks. In 2014, the CDC reported that 1.3% of reported abortions (5,578) were performed at 21 weeks of gestation or later. While little data exists on abortions done after 26 weeks, one study from 1992 estimated the rate at 0.02%.

== Reasons ==
=== United States ===
Reasons for late terminations of pregnancy include when a pregnant woman's health is at risk, when lethal fetal abnormalities have been detected, or when barriers to receiving abortion cause delays.

A 2013 study found, after excluding abortion "on grounds of fetal anomaly or life endangerment", that women seeking abortions between 20-28 weeks "fit at least one of five profiles: They were raising children alone, were depressed or using illicit substances, were in conflict with a male partner or experiencing domestic violence, had trouble deciding and then had access problems, or were young and nulliparous". The study concluded that "bans on abortion after 20 weeks will disproportionately affect young women and women with limited financial resources".

=== England and Wales ===
The NHS records the reasons given for abortions at all stages of development. In 2015, 2,877 abortions were performed at 20 weeks or above, and only 230 of these at or beyond 24 weeks gestation. Of all abortions at 20 weeks or above, 23 (0.8%) were performed to save the life of the pregnant woman, 1,801 (63%) were performed for mental or physical health reasons, and 1046 (36%) were performed because of fetal abnormalities.

== Legal restrictions ==
As of 1998, among the 152 most populous countries, 54 either banned abortion entirely or permitted it only to save the life of the pregnant woman.

On the other hand, as of 1998, 49 of the 152 most populous countries allowed abortion without restriction as to reason, but 44 of these required specific justification after a particular gestational age:

- 12 weeks (Albania, Armenia, Azerbaijan, Belarus, Belgium, Bosnia-Herzegovina, Bulgaria, Croatia, Cuba, Czech Republic, Denmark, Estonia, Georgia, Greece, Kazakhstan, Kyrgyzstan, Latvia, Lithuania, Moldova, Mongolia, Norway, Russia, Saudi Arabia, Slovakia, Slovenia, South Africa, Ukraine, Tajikistan, Tunisia, Turkey, Turkmenistan and Uzbekistan)
- 13 weeks (Italy)
- 14 weeks (Argentina, Austria, Cambodia, France, Germany, Hungary, Romania and Spain)
- 18 weeks (Sweden)
- 22 weeks (North Macedonia)
- 24 weeks (Singapore, Netherlands)
- viability (to some extent the United States)
- no limit unless the child is born during said attempted abortion (Canada, some states in the United States, China, and South Korea)

Dutch Criminal Code defines the "viability" of a fetus to 24 weeks, but doctors de facto limit on-request abortions to 22 weeks as a margin of error.

As of 2011 among those countries that allowed abortion without restriction as to reason, the gestational limits for such abortions on request were: 37 countries set a gestational limit of 12 weeks, 7 countries of 14 weeks, 4 did not set limits, 3 at viability, 3 at 10 weeks, one at 90 days, one at 8 weeks, one at 18 weeks, and one at 24 weeks. In addition, abortion in Australia, and, to a certain extent, abortion in the United States, is regulated at state/territory level, and laws vary by region.

In these countries, abortions after the general gestational age limit are allowed only under restricted circumstances, which include, depending on country, risk to the woman's life, physical or mental health, fetal malformation, cases where the pregnancy was the result of rape, or poor socio-economic conditions. For instance, in Italy, abortion is allowed on request up until 90 days, after which it is allowed only if the pregnancy or childbirth pose a threat to the woman's life, a risk to physical health of the woman, a risk to mental health of the woman; if there is a risk of fetal malformation; or if the pregnancy is the result of rape or other sexual crime. Denmark provides a wider range of reasons, including social and economic ones, which can be invoked by a woman who seeks an abortion after 12 weeks.

Abortions at such stages must in general be approved by a doctor or a special committee, unlike early abortions which are performed on demand. The ease with which the doctor or the committee allows a late term abortion varies significantly by country, and is often influenced by the social and religious views prevalent in that region.

Some countries, like Canada, China (mainland only) and Vietnam have no legal limit on when an abortion can be performed.

=== United States ===
The United States Supreme Court decisions on abortion, including Roe v. Wade, allow states to impose more restrictions on post-viability abortions than during the earlier stages of pregnancy.

As of December 2014, forty-three states had bans on late-term abortions that were not facially unconstitutional under Roe v. Wade or enjoined by court order. In addition, the Supreme Court in the case of Gonzales v. Carhart ruled that Congress may ban certain late-term abortion techniques, "both previability and postviability", as it had done in banning intact dilation and extraction with the Partial-Birth Abortion Ban Act of 2003.

The Supreme Court has held that bans must include exceptions for threats to the woman's life, physical health, and mental health, but four states allow late-term abortions only when the woman's life is at risk; four allow them when the woman's life or physical health is at risk, but use a definition of health that abortion-rights organizations believe is impermissibly narrow. Note that just because a portion of a state's law is found to be unconstitutional does not mean that the entire law will be deemed unconstitutional: "[I]nvalidating the statute entirely is not always necessary or justified, for lower courts may be able to render narrower declaratory and injunctive relief," meaning the court could declare that only those parts of the law that are violative of the Constitution are invalid (declaratory relief), or that the court can prohibit the state from enforcing those portions of the law (injunctive relief).

Eighteen states prohibit abortion after a certain number of weeks' gestation (usually 22 weeks from the last menstrual period). The U.S. Supreme Court held in Webster v. Reproductive Health Services that a statute may create "a presumption of viability" after a certain number of weeks, in which case the physician must be given an opportunity to rebut the presumption by performing tests. Because this provision is not explicitly written into these state laws, as it was in the Missouri law examined in Webster, abortion-rights organizations believe that such a state law is unconstitutional, but only "to the extent that it prohibits pre-viability abortions".

Ten states (although Florida's enforcement of such laws are under permanent injunction) require a second physician's approval before a late-term abortion can be performed. The U.S. Supreme Court struck down a requirement of "confirmation by two other physicians" (rather than one other physician) because "acquiescence by co-practitioners has no rational connection with a patient's needs and unduly infringes on the physician's right to practice". Abortion-rights organizations, such as the Guttmacher Institute, posit that some of these state laws are unconstitutional, based on these and other Supreme Court rulings, at least to the extent that these state laws require approval of a second or third physician.

Thirteen states have laws that require a second physician to be present during late-term abortion procedures in order to treat a fetus if born alive. The Court has held that a doctor's right to practice is not infringed by requiring a second physician to be present at abortions performed after viability in order to assist in the case of a living fetus. It is not common for live infants to be born after an abortion at any stage in pregnancy.

=== Live birth ===
In 2019, a US Senate Bill entitled the Born-Alive Abortion Survivors Protection Act raised the issue of live birth after abortion. The bill would mandate that medical providers resuscitate neonates delivered showing signs of life during an abortion process. During the debate around this issue, US Republicans alleged that medical providers "execute" live-born babies. Existing US laws would punish execution as homicide. Furthermore, US abortion experts refute the claim that a "born-alive" fetus is a common event and oppose enactment of laws that would mandate resuscitation against the wishes of the parents.

1.3% of abortions occur after 21 weeks of pregnancy in the US. Although it is very uncommon, women undergoing surgical abortion after this gestational age sometimes give birth to a fetus that may survive briefly. The periviable period is considered to be between 20 and 25 weeks gestation. Long-term survival is possible after 22 weeks. However, odds of long-term survival between 22 and 23 weeks are 2–3 percent and odds of survival between 23 and 24 weeks are 20 percent. "Intact survival", which means survival of a neonate without subsequent damage to organs such as the brain or bowel is 1% at 22 weeks and 13% at 23 weeks. Survival odds increase with increasing gestational age.

If medical staff observe signs of life, they may be required to provide care: emergency medical care if the child has a good chance of survival and palliative care if not. Induced fetal demise before termination of pregnancy after 20–21 weeks gestation is recommended by some sources to avoid this and to comply with the US Partial Birth Abortion Ban. Induced fetal demise does not improve the safety of an abortion procedure and may incur risks to the health of the woman having the abortion.

== Methods ==
There are at least four medical procedures associated with late-term abortions:

- Dilation and evacuation (D&E)
- Early labor induction (sometimes called "induction abortion")
- Intact dilation and extraction (IDX or D&X), sometimes referred to as "partial-birth abortion"
- Hysterotomy abortion
