= Partial-Birth Abortion Ban Act =

2003 U.S. federal law banning partial-birth abortion

Partial-Birth Abortion Ban Act of 2003
- Long title: An Act to prohibit the procedure commonly known as partial-birth abortion.
- Nicknames: PBA Ban
- Enacted by: the 108th United States Congress

Citations
- Public law: Pub. L. 108–105 (text) (PDF)
- Statutes at Large: 117 Stat. 1201

Codification
- Titles amended: 18
- U.S.C. sections created: 18 U.S.C. § 1531

Legislative history
- Introduced in the Senate as S. 3 by Rick Santorum (R–PA) on February 14, 2003; Passed the Senate on March 13, 2003 (64–33); Passed the House on June 4, 2003 (282–139 as H.R. 760, inserted in lieu by unanimous consent); Reported by the joint conference committee on September 30, 2003; agreed to by the House on October 2, 2003 (281–142) and by the Senate on October 21, 2003 (64–34); Signed into law by President George W. Bush on November 5, 2003

United States Supreme Court cases
- Gonzales v. Carhart (2007)

The Partial-Birth Abortion Ban Act of 2003 (Pub. L. 108–105 (text) (PDF), 117 Stat. 1201, enacted November 5, 2003, 18 U.S.C. § 1531, PBA Ban) and signed by President George W. Bush, is a United States law prohibiting a form of late termination of pregnancy called "partial-birth abortion", referred to in medical literature as intact dilation and extraction. Under this law, any physician "who, in or affecting interstate or foreign commerce, knowingly performs a partial-birth abortion and thereby kills a human fetus shall be fined under this title or imprisoned not more than 2 years, or both". The law was enacted in 2003, and in 2007 its constitutionality was upheld by the U.S. Supreme Court in the case of Gonzales v. Carhart. This law became the first, and so far only, federal law in the United States restricting the abortion procedure itself. All other federal abortion laws simply concern funding restrictions, emergency care protocols, FDA approval of medications, or other secondary aspects, or apply to medical care in general rather than abortion specifically.

== Provisions ==
This statute prohibits a method of abortion; the statute calls the prohibited method "partial birth abortion." The procedure described in the statute is used in the second trimester, from 15 to 26 weeks, most of which occurs before viability. The law itself contains no reference to gestational age or viability. The statute is directed only at a method of abortion, rather than at preventing any woman from obtaining an abortion.

The statute includes two findings of Congress:

(1) A moral, medical, and ethical consensus exists that the practice of performing a partial-birth abortion ... is a gruesome and inhumane procedure that is never medically necessary and should be prohibited. (2) Rather than being an abortion procedure that is embraced by the medical community, particularly among physicians who routinely perform other abortion procedures, partial-birth abortion remains a disfavored procedure that is not only unnecessary to preserve the health of the mother, but in fact poses serious risks to the long-term health of women and in some circumstances, their lives. As a result, at least 27 States banned the procedure as did the United States Congress which voted to ban the procedure during the 104th, 105th, and 106th Congresses.

The statute also provides that:

There is an exception for the life of the pregnant person, however the physician who performed the abortion may have to prove to the State Medical Board that the life of the pregnant person was endangered and the abortion was necessary.

Hadley Arkes commented, in an editorial in the National Review, "[t]hat provision went even further than the law was obliged to go, for as the American Medical Association testified during the hearings, a partial-birth abortion bore no relevance to any measure needed to advance the health of any woman."

Citing the Supreme Court case of Doe v. Bolton (1973), some anti-abortion supporters have asserted that the word "health" would render any legal restriction meaningless, because of the broad and vague interpretation of "health". This was of particular concern when it came to anticipated arguments that such a definition would encompass "mental health", which some thought would inevitably be expanded by court decisions to include the prevention of depression or other non-physical conditions. Pro-abortion groups object to this statute primarily because there is no exemption if the health of a woman is at risk.

== Partial-Birth Abortion Defined by Law ==
The phrase "partial-birth abortion" was first coined by Douglas Johnson of the National Right to Life Committee. The phrase has been used in numerous state and federal bills and laws, although the legal definition of the term is not always the same. Though the official name of the bill is The Partial-Birth Abortion Act of 2003, It has been argued that using the word "partial-birth abortion" in the bill name was used to draw attention it by the public, the official name of the procedure banned is called Intact dilation and extraction. The Partial-Birth Abortion Ban Act defines "partial-birth abortion" as follows:

In the 2000 Supreme Court case of Stenberg v. Carhart, a Nebraska law banning partial-birth abortion was ruled unconstitutional, in part because the language defining "partial-birth abortion" was deemed vague. In 2006, the Supreme Court in Gonzales v. Carhart found that the 2003 act "departs in material ways" from the Nebraska law and that it pertains only to a specific abortion procedure, intact dilation and extraction. Some commentators have noted that the Partial-Birth Abortion Ban Act's language was carefully crafted to take into account previous rulings. Although in most cases the procedure legally defined as "partial birth abortion" would be medically defined as "intact dilation and extraction", these overlapping terms do not always coincide. For example, the IDX procedure may be used to remove a deceased fetus (e.g. due to a miscarriage or feticide) that is developed enough to require dilation of the cervix for its extraction. Removing a dead fetus does not meet the federal legal definition of "partial-birth abortion", which specifies that partial live delivery must precede "the overt act, other than completion of delivery, that kills the partially delivered living fetus". Additionally, a doctor may extract a fetus past the navel and then "disarticulate [i.e. decapitate] at the neck", which could fall within the terms of the statute even though it would not result in an intact body and therefore would not be an intact dilation and extraction.

An abortion in which the person performing the abortion, deliberately and intentionally vaginally delivers a living fetus until, in the case of a head-first presentation, the entire fetal head is outside the body of the mother, or, in the case of breech presentation, any part of the fetal trunk past the navel is outside the body of the mother, for the purpose of performing an overt act that the person knows will kill the partially delivered living fetus; and performs the overt act, other than completion of delivery, that kills the partially delivered living fetus. (18 U.S. Code 1531)

== Legislative History ==
The Republican-led Congress first passed similar laws banning partial-birth abortion in December 1995, and again October 1997, but they were vetoed by President Bill Clinton.

In the House, the final legislation was supported in 2003 by 218 Republicans and 63 Democrats. It was opposed by 4 Republicans, 137 Democrats, and 1 independent. Twelve members were absent, 7 Republicans and 5 Democrats. In the Senate the bill was supported by 47 Republicans and 17 Democrats. It was opposed by 3 Republicans, 30 Democrats, and 1 independent. Two Senators were absent, Kay Bailey Hutchison (R-TX), a supporter of the bill, and John Edwards (D-NC), an opponent of the bill.

The only substantive difference between the House and Senate versions was the Harkin Amendment expressing support for Roe v. Wade. A House–Senate conference committee deleted the Harkin Amendment, which therefore is absent from the final legislation. There was disagreement in congress about the fact that the bill did not have an exception for the health of the pregnant woman if medically necessary, however it was met with congressional findings during the committee reports, that the abortion procedure was never medically necessary, so it was agree upon to not include such exception. On November 5, 2003, after being passed by both the House and the Senate, the bill was signed by President George W. Bush to become law. It had become the first federal statue since Roe v. Wade, that had restricted a certain type of abortion.

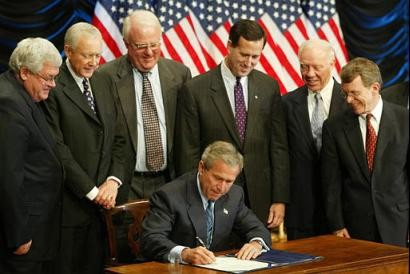
Rick Santorum at the signing of the Partial-Birth Abortion Ban Act by Pres. George W. Bush in 2004

The most prevalent bill sponsor was Rick Santorum, who previously served as a member of the U.S House of Representatives from Pennsylvania's 18th district from 1991-1995, but at the time the bill was being discussed and passed, he was the current Republican senator of Pennsylvania. He was also chair of the Republican Conference from 2001-2007. Santorum's rich religious and political history was the driving factor for sponsoring the bill.

== Judicial History ==
The constitutionality of the law was challenged immediately after the signing. Three different U.S. district courts declared the law unconstitutional. All three cited the law's omission of an exception for the health of the woman (as opposed to the life of the woman), and all three decisions cited precedent set by Roe v. Wade (1973) and Stenberg v. Carhart (2000). The federal government appealed the district court rulings, which were then affirmed by three courts of appeals. The Supreme Court agreed to hear the Carhart case on February 21, 2006, and agreed to hear the companion Planned Parenthood case on June 19, 2006.

On April 18, 2007, the Supreme Court in a 5–4 decision, Gonzales v. Carhart, held that the statute does not violate the Constitution. Justice Anthony Kennedy wrote for the majority which included Justices Samuel Alito, Clarence Thomas, Antonin Scalia, and Chief Justice John Roberts. Justice Ruth Bader Ginsburg wrote the dissent which was joined by Stephen Breyer, David Souter, and John Paul Stevens. Kennedy's majority opinion argued that the case differed from Stenberg v. Carhart, a 2000 case in which the Supreme Court struck down a state ban on partial-birth abortion as unconstitutional, in that the Partial Birth Abortion Act defined the banned procedure more clearly. In dissent, Ginsburg argued that the decision departed from established abortion jurisprudence, and that lack of a health exception "jeopardizes women’s health and places doctors in an untenable position". The replacement of O'Connor by Alito was identified as a key difference between the 5–4 decision against the Nebraska law in Stenberg and the 5–4 support for the abortion ban in Gonzales.

== Public opinion ==
A Rasmussen Reports poll four days after the court's decision found that 40% of respondents "knew the ruling allowed states to place some restrictions on specific abortion procedures". Of those who knew of the decision, 66% agreed with the decision and 32% were opposed. An ABC poll from 2003 found that 62% of respondents thought partial-birth abortion should be illegal; a similar number of respondents wanted an exception "if it would prevent a serious threat to the woman's health". Additional polls from 2003 found between 60–75% in favor of banning partial-birth abortions and between 25–40% opposed.

There was a mix of recent events as well as long standing trends that contributed to the passage of the Partial Birth Abortion Act. Recent events included that there had been increased attention from Nebraska Supreme Court ruling that a ban on partial abortion is unconstitutional. A larger widespread event that most likely contributed to prompt legislation was the Supreme Court case Roe v. Wade which said abortion was permissible depending on what stage of pregnancy a woman was at. There was widespread outrage and though states could not outlaw abortion completely under Roe, it prompted some states to attempt to regulate abortion within the frame of it.

Surveys during the early 2000s evaluated the public by asking what circumstances should abortion be permitted/what regulations should be put on the procedure. In the early 2000s, when asked when abortion should be illegal, a majority answered only under certain circumstances. The 17-18% of people that believe abortion should be illegal under any circumstance most likely provided unwavering support to this bill, while the 50-55% of people who believed it should be legal only under some circumstance.

== Clinical response ==
In response to this statute, many abortion providers have adopted the practice of inducing fetal demise before beginning late-term abortions. Typically, a solution of potassium chloride or digoxin is injected directly into the fetal heart using ultrasound to guide the needle. This is often done by providers who do not perform intact dilation and extraction procedures (as well as by those who do) because they feel the broad wording of the ban compels them "to do all they can to protect themselves and their staff from the possibility of being accused".
