= Gonzales v. Carhart =

2007 United States Supreme Court case on abortion

- Supreme Court of the United States

Argued November 8, 2006 Decided April 18, 2007
- Full case name: Alberto R. Gonzales, Attorney General, Petitioner v. LeRoy Carhart, et al.; Alberto R. Gonzales, Attorney General, Petitioner v. Planned Parenthood Federation of America, Inc., et al.
- Docket nos.: 05-380; 05-1382
- Citations: 550 U.S. 124 (more) 127 S. Ct. 1610; 167 L. Ed. 2d 480; 2007 U.S. LEXIS 4338; 75 U.S.L.W. 4210
- Argument: Oral argument
- Decision: Opinion

Questions presented
- Whether, notwithstanding Congress's determination that a health exception was unnecessary to preserve the health of the mother, the Partial Birth Abortion Ban Act of 2003 is invalid because it lacks a health exception or is otherwise unconstitutional on its face.

Holding
- The Partial-Birth Abortion Ban Act of 2003 is constitutional. Respondents have not demonstrated that the Act, as a facial matter, is void for vagueness, or that it imposes an undue burden on a woman's right to abortion based on its overbreadth or lack of a health exception.

Court membership
- Chief Justice John Roberts Associate Justices John P. Stevens · Antonin Scalia; Anthony Kennedy · David Souter; Clarence Thomas · Ruth Bader Ginsburg; Stephen Breyer · Samuel Alito

Case opinions
- Majority: Kennedy, joined by Roberts, Scalia, Thomas, Alito
- Concurrence: Thomas, joined by Scalia
- Dissent: Ginsburg, joined by Stevens, Souter, Breyer

Laws applied
- U.S. Const. amend. V; Partial-Birth Abortion Ban Act

Gonzales v. Carhart, 550 U.S. 124 (2007), is a landmark decision of the U.S. Supreme Court that upheld the Partial-Birth Abortion Ban Act of 2003. The case reached the high court after U.S. Attorney General, Alberto Gonzales, appealed a ruling of the U.S. Court of Appeals for the Eighth Circuit in favor of LeRoy Carhart that struck down the Act. Also before the Supreme Court was the consolidated appeal of Gonzales v. Planned Parenthood from the U.S. Court of Appeals for the Ninth Circuit, whose ruling had the same effect as that of the Eighth Circuit.

The Supreme Court's decision upheld Congress's ban and held that it did not impose an undue burden on the due process right of women to obtain an abortion, "under precedents we here assume to be controlling", such as the Court's prior decisions in Roe v. Wade and Planned Parenthood v. Casey. In a legal sense, the case distinguished but did not overrule Stenberg v. Carhart (2000), in which the Court dealt with related issues. Gonzales was widely interpreted as signaling a shift in Supreme Court jurisprudence toward a restriction of abortion rights, occasioned in part by the retirement of Sandra Day O'Connor and her replacement by Samuel Alito.

The Court found that there is "uncertainty [in the medical community] over whether the barred procedure is ever necessary to preserve a woman's health", and in the past the Court "has given state and federal legislatures wide discretion to pass legislation in areas where there is medical and scientific uncertainty."

== History of case ==
The Partial-Birth Abortion Ban Act was signed into law by President George W. Bush on November 5, 2003. It was found unconstitutional in the U.S. District Courts for the Northern District of California, the Southern District of New York, and the District of Nebraska.

The federal government appealed the district court rulings, first bringing Carhart v. Gonzales before a three-judge panel of the U.S. Court of Appeals for the Eighth Circuit. The panel unanimously affirmed the ruling of the Nebraska court on July 8, 2005. Finding that the government offered no "new evidence which would serve to distinguish this record from the record reviewed by the Supreme Court in Stenberg," they held that the Partial-Birth Abortion Ban Act was unconstitutional because it lacked an exception for the health of the woman.

Attorney General Gonzales petitioned the U.S. Supreme Court to review the Eighth Circuit decision on September 25, 2005. Meanwhile, the Ninth Circuit also found the law unconstitutional, as did the Second Circuit (with a dissent), issuing their opinions on January 31, 2006. The Supreme Court agreed to hear the Carhart case on February 21, 2006, and agreed to hear the companion Planned Parenthood case on June 19, 2006.

== Decision ==
Justice Anthony Kennedy wrote for the Court that the respondents had failed to prove that Congress lacked authority to ban this abortion procedure. Chief Justice John Roberts, Justice Samuel Alito, Justice Clarence Thomas, and Justice Antonin Scalia agreed with the Court's judgment, joining Kennedy's opinion.

The Court left the door open for as-applied challenges, citing its recent precedent in Ayotte v. Planned Parenthood of New England. According to Washington Post reporter Benjamin Wittes, "The Court majority, following the path it sketched out last year in the New Hampshire case, decided to let the law stand as a facial matter and let the parties fight later about what, if any, applications need to be blocked."

The Court decided to "assume ... for the purposes of this opinion" the principles of Roe v. Wade and Planned Parenthood v. Casey.

The Court said that the lower courts had repudiated a central premise of Casey—that the state has an interest in preserving fetal life—and the Court held that the ban fit that interest so as not to create an undue burden. The opinion did not rely deferentially on Congress's findings that this intact dilation and extraction procedure is never needed to protect the health of a pregnant woman; in fact the Court found that "evidence presented in the District Courts contradicts that conclusion." However, Kennedy wrote that a health exception was unnecessary where medical testimony disputes Congress's findings, that Congress is still entitled to regulate in an area where the medical community has not reached a consensus.

In addition, the Court distinguished this case from the Stenberg case (in which the Court struck down Nebraska's partial-birth abortion law) by holding that the state statute at issue in Stenberg was more ambiguous than the later federal statute at issue in Carhart.

The majority opinion's statement that it "seems unexceptionable to conclude some women come to regret their choice to abort the infant life they once created and sustained" supported its conclusion that "the State has an interest in ensuring so grave a choice is well informed" because doctors might not tell patients graphic details about what goes on during the abortion. This also acknowledges a state interest for informed consent laws dealing with abortion.

Without discussing the constitutional rationale of the Court's prior abortion cases (i.e. "due process"), the majority opinion stated it disagreed with the Eighth Circuit's determination that the federal statute conflicted with "the Due Process Clause of the Fifth Amendment, [which] is textually identical to the Due Process Clause of the Fourteenth Amendment."

== Concurrence ==
Justice Thomas filed a concurring opinion, joined by Justice Scalia, which mentions saving for another day the issue of whether Congress had sufficient power under the Commerce Clause to enact this ban. The Commerce Clause (the only Constitutional clause mentioned explicitly in any of the decision's three opinions) was also mentioned in the majority opinion.

The concurrence also stated that Justices Thomas and Scalia joined the Court's opinion "because it accurately applies current jurisprudence." In addition, the concurrence reiterated the justices' view that current abortion jurisprudence "has no basis in the Constitution." Nadine Strossen, president of the ACLU at the time, pointed out that "no less an anti-abortion proponent than Justice Scalia joined by Justice Thomas, in his separate opinion, chided the majority for not coming out and explicitly saying that they had overturned not Roe v. Wade, but the prior partial-birth abortion ban case."

== Dissent ==
Joined by Justices David Souter, John Paul Stevens, and Stephen Breyer, Justice Ruth Bader Ginsburg dissented, contending that the ruling was an "alarming" one that ignored Supreme Court abortion precedent and "refuse[d] to take Casey and Stenberg seriously." Referring in particular to Planned Parenthood v. Casey, Ginsburg sought to ground the Court's abortion jurisprudence based on concepts of personal autonomy and equal citizenship rather than the Court's previous privacy approach: "Thus, legal challenges to undue restrictions on abortion procedures do not seek to vindicate some generalized notion of privacy; rather, they center on a woman's autonomy to determine her life's course, and thus to enjoy equal citizenship stature."

Ginsburg also took issue with the lack of a health exception, writing that "the absence of a health exception burdens all women for whom it is relevant—women who, in the judgment of their doctors, require an intact D&E because other procedures would place their health at risk." In general, the dissent criticized the usurpation of medical decision-making by legislators and the minimization of "the reasoned medical judgments of highly trained doctors ... as 'preferences' motivated by 'mere convenience'."

Observing that the majority opinion in Carhart did not touch upon the question of whether the Court's prior decisions in Roe v. Wade and Planned Parenthood v. Casey were valid, Justice Ginsburg wrote, "Casey's principles, confirming the continuing vitality of 'the essential holding of Roe,' are merely 'assume[d]' for the moment ... rather than 'retained' or 'reaffirmed.'" She concluded by criticizing the majority for abandoning the principle of stare decisis, writing that "a decision so at odds with our jurisprudence should not have staying power."

== Reactions ==
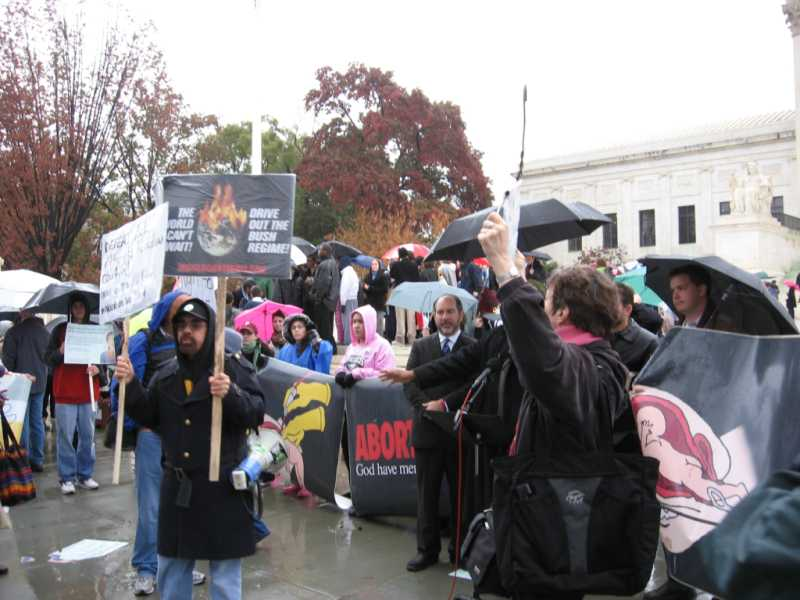
Pro-choice and pro-life activists demonstrate on the steps of the Court in November 2006.

According to an ABC News poll, the majority of Americans (69%) oppose the legality of D&X or what opponents call "partial-birth" abortion.

Some medical groups expressed concern that the Court, in supporting the Partial-Birth Abortion Ban Act, endorsed the substitution of congressional legislation for medical judgment. The American College of Obstetricians and Gynecologists, which had submitted an amicus brief opposing the Act, described the Court's decision as "shameful and incomprehensible", ignorant of medical consensus, and chilling for the medical profession. The New England Journal of Medicine criticized the intrusion of politicians into medical decision-making, writing:

Until this opinion, the Court recognized the importance of not interfering with medical judgments made by physicians to protect a patient's interest. For the first time, the Court permits congressional judgment to replace medical judgment.

Professor and academic Geoffrey R. Stone has argued that the religion of Supreme Court judges played an important role in the decision, given that the five judges in the majority were Roman Catholic.
