= United States anti-abortion movement =

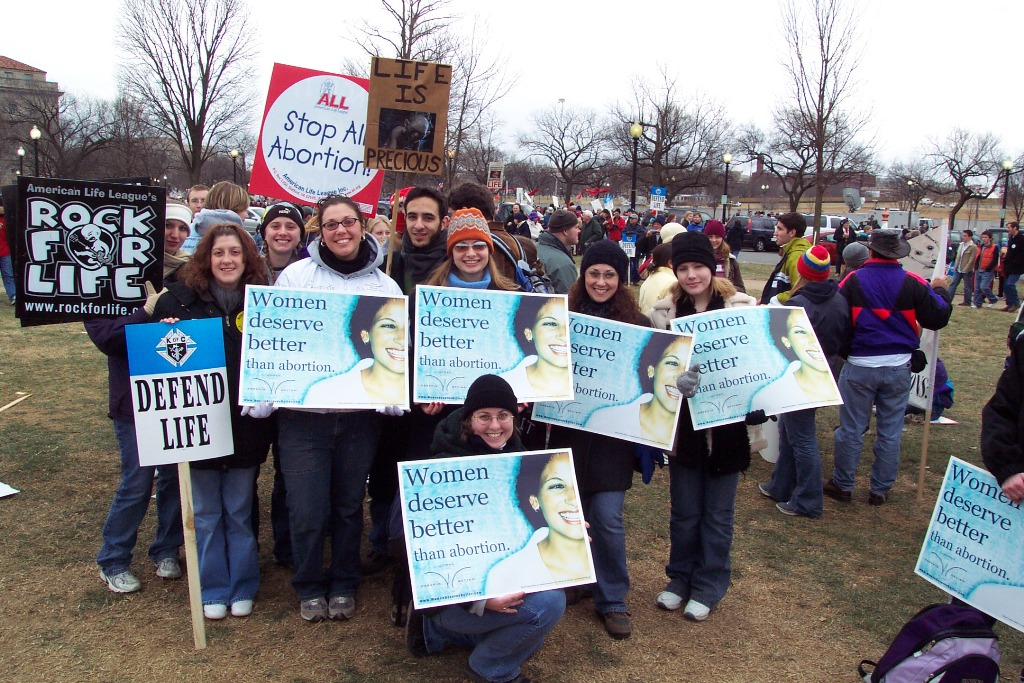
Demonstrators at the 2004 March for Life

In the United States, the anti-abortion movement, also called the pro-life movement or right-to-life movement, opposes induced abortion and advocates for the protection of fetuses. Advocates support legal prohibition or restriction on ethical, moral, or religious grounds, arguing that human life begins at conception and that the human zygote, embryo, or fetus is a person and therefore has a right to life. The anti-abortion movement includes a variety of organizations, with no single centralized decision-making body. There are diverse arguments and rationales for the anti-abortion stance. Some allow for some permissible abortions, including therapeutic abortions, in exceptional circumstances such as incest, rape, severe fetal defects, or when the woman's health is at risk.

Before the Supreme Court 1973 decisions in Roe v. Wade and Doe v. Bolton, anti-abortion views predominated and found expression in state laws which prohibited or restricted abortions in a variety of ways. (See Abortion in the United States.) The anti-abortion movement became politically active and dedicated to the reversal of the Roe v. Wade decision, which had struck down most state laws restricting abortion in the first trimester of pregnancy. In the United States, the movement is associated with several Christian religious groups, especially the Catholic Church and Evangelical churches, and is frequently, but not exclusively, allied with the Republican Party. The movement is also supported by secular organizations (such as Secular Pro-Life) and non-mainstream anti-abortion feminists. The movement has campaigned to reverse Roe v. Wade and to promote legislative changes or constitutional amendments, such as the Human Life Amendment, that prohibit or at least broadly restrict abortion.

On the other side of the abortion debate in the United States is the abortion-rights movement (also called the pro-choice movement), which argues that pregnant women should have the right to choose whether to have an abortion.

In June 2022, the Supreme Court overturned Roe v. Wade in Dobbs v. Jackson Women's Health Organization, ending federal abortion rights and allowing individual states to set their own abortion laws.

== History ==
Throughout the 1950s and 1960s, a movement to liberalize abortion laws gained momentum due in part to the second-wave feminist movement and to a number of high-profile therapeutic abortion cases, such as that of Sherri Finkbine. In 1965, a Supreme Court decision in Griswold v. Connecticut set a precedent for an expansive right to privacy in the area of reproductive healthcare. In the late 1960s, in response to nationwide abortion-rights efforts, a number of organizations were formed to mobilize opinion against the legalization of abortion. Most of these were led by Catholic institutions and communities; most evangelical Christian groups did not see abortion as a clear-cut or priority issue at the time. The first major U.S. organization in the modern anti-abortion movement, the National Right to Life Committee, was formed out of the United States Catholic Conference in 1967.

The description "pro-life" was adopted by the right-to-life (anti-abortion) movement in the United States following the Supreme Court 1973 decision Roe v. Wade, which held that a woman may terminate her pregnancy prior to the viability of the fetus outside of the womb and may also terminate her pregnancy "subsequent to viability ... for the preservation of the life or health of the mother". The term pro-life was adopted instead of anti-abortion to highlight their proponents' belief that abortion is the taking of a human life, rather than an issue concerning the restriction of women's reproductive rights, as the pro-choice movement would say. The first organized action was initiated by U.S. Catholic bishops who recommended in 1973 that the U.S. Constitution should be amended to ban abortion.

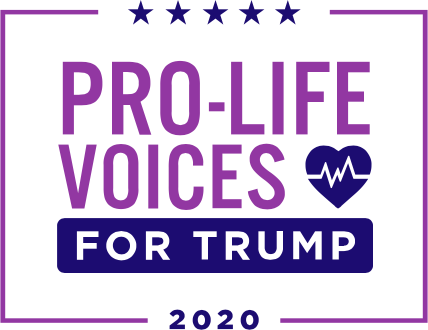

Roe v. Wade was considered a major setback by anti-abortion campaigners. The case and the overturning of most anti-abortion laws spurred the growth of a largely religious-based anti-abortion political and social movement, even as Americans were becoming, in the 1970s and 1980s, increasingly pro-choice. The first major anti-abortion success since Roe's case came in 1976 with the passing of the Hyde Amendment prohibiting the use of certain federal funds for abortions. In Harris v. McRae, anti-abortion advocates won a 1980 challenge to the Hyde Amendment. That same year, anti-abortion politicians gained control of the Republican Party's platform committee, adding anti-abortion planks to the Republican position, and calling for a Human Life Amendment to the U.S. Constitution, banning abortion. Four anti-abortion U.S. Presidents – Ronald Reagan, George H. W. Bush, George W. Bush, and Donald Trump – have been elected.

Lisa Miller of The Washington Post wrote about the younger, more feminine face of the anti-abortion movement with the rise of leaders such as Lila Rose of Live Action, Marjorie Dannenfelser of the Susan B. Anthony List, Charmaine Yoest of Americans United for Life, Penny Nance of Concerned Women for America, and Kristan Hawkins of Students for Life, all "youngish Christian working mothers with children at home" who seek to combat the image of the anti-abortion movement as made up of "old white men" who cannot relate to the experience of pregnant women.

The anti-abortion movement has been successful in recent years in promoting new laws against abortion within the states. The Guttmacher Institute said eighty laws restricting abortion were passed in the first six months of 2011, "more than double the previous record of 34 abortion restrictions enacted in 2005—and more than triple the 23 enacted in 2010".

In 2019, six U.S. states (Georgia, Kentucky, Louisiana, Missouri, Mississippi, and Ohio) enacted fetal heartbeat abortion bills. These heartbeat bills generally restrict abortion to the time period in pregnancy before a fetal heartbeat can be detected (which can be as early as six weeks of gestation or as late as twelve weeks). The bills faced legal challenges, with their supporters having stated they hoped the legislation would allow the United States Supreme Court to reconsider Roe v Wade. Other abortion-related laws passed in several US states during this time period, which were upheld by the judicial system, include laws requiring an ultrasound before an abortion and laws that mandate fetal burial or cremation after an abortion.

In June 2022, by its 6–3 ruling in Dobbs v. Jackson Women's Health Organization, the Supreme Court upheld Mississippi's abortion law at issue in the case. In a 5–4 ruling, the court found there is no constitutional right to abortion and overruled Roe v. Wade and Planned Parenthood v. Casey, ending a constitutionally protected nationwide right to abortion and allowing states to make their own separate abortion laws.

== Overview ==
The anti-abortion movement includes a variety of organizations, with no single centralized decision-making body. There are diverse arguments and rationales for the anti-abortion stance.

Many socially conservative organizations are involved in the anti-abortion movement. Some groups focus solely on promoting the anti-abortion cause, such as American Life League, the Susan B. Anthony List, National Right to Life Committee, Americans United for Life, and Live Action, among many others. Other groups support not only the anti-abortion cause but the broader family values cause, such as Family Research Council, Focus on the Family, American Family Association, and Concerned Women for America, among many others.

Abortion opponents generally believe that human life should be valued either from fertilization or implantation until natural death. The contemporary anti-abortion movement is typically, but not exclusively, influenced by conservative Christian beliefs and has influenced certain strains of bioethical utilitarianism. From that viewpoint, any action which destroys an embryo or fetus kills a person. Any deliberate destruction of human life is considered ethically or morally wrong and is not considered to be mitigated by any benefits to others, as such benefits are coming at the expense of the life of what they believe to be a person. In some cases, this belief extends to opposing abortion of fetuses that would almost certainly expire within a short time after birth, such as anencephalic fetuses.

Some abortion opponents also oppose certain forms of birth control, particularly hormonal contraception such as emergency contraception (ECPs), and copper IUDs which may prevent the implantation of a zygote. Because they believe that the term pregnancy should be defined so as to begin at fertilization, they refer to these contraceptives as abortifacients because they cause the fertilized egg to be flushed out during menses. The Catholic Church endorses this view. There are, however, anti-abortion physicians who concur with the view that hormonal contraception does not block implantation.

Attachment to an anti-abortion position is often but not exclusively connected to religious beliefs about the sanctity of life (see also culture of life). Exclusively secular-humanist positions against abortion tend to be a minority viewpoint among anti-abortion advocates; these groups say that their position is based on human rights and biology, rather than religion. Some holding the anti-abortion position also hold a complementarian view of gender roles, though there is also a self-described feminist element inside the movement.

== Views in opposition to abortion ==
The variety in opinion on the issue of abortion is reflected in the diverse views of religious groups. For example, the Catholic Church considers all procured abortions morally evil, while traditional Jewish teaching sanctions abortion if necessary to safeguard the life and well-being of the pregnant woman.

=== Christian groups ===
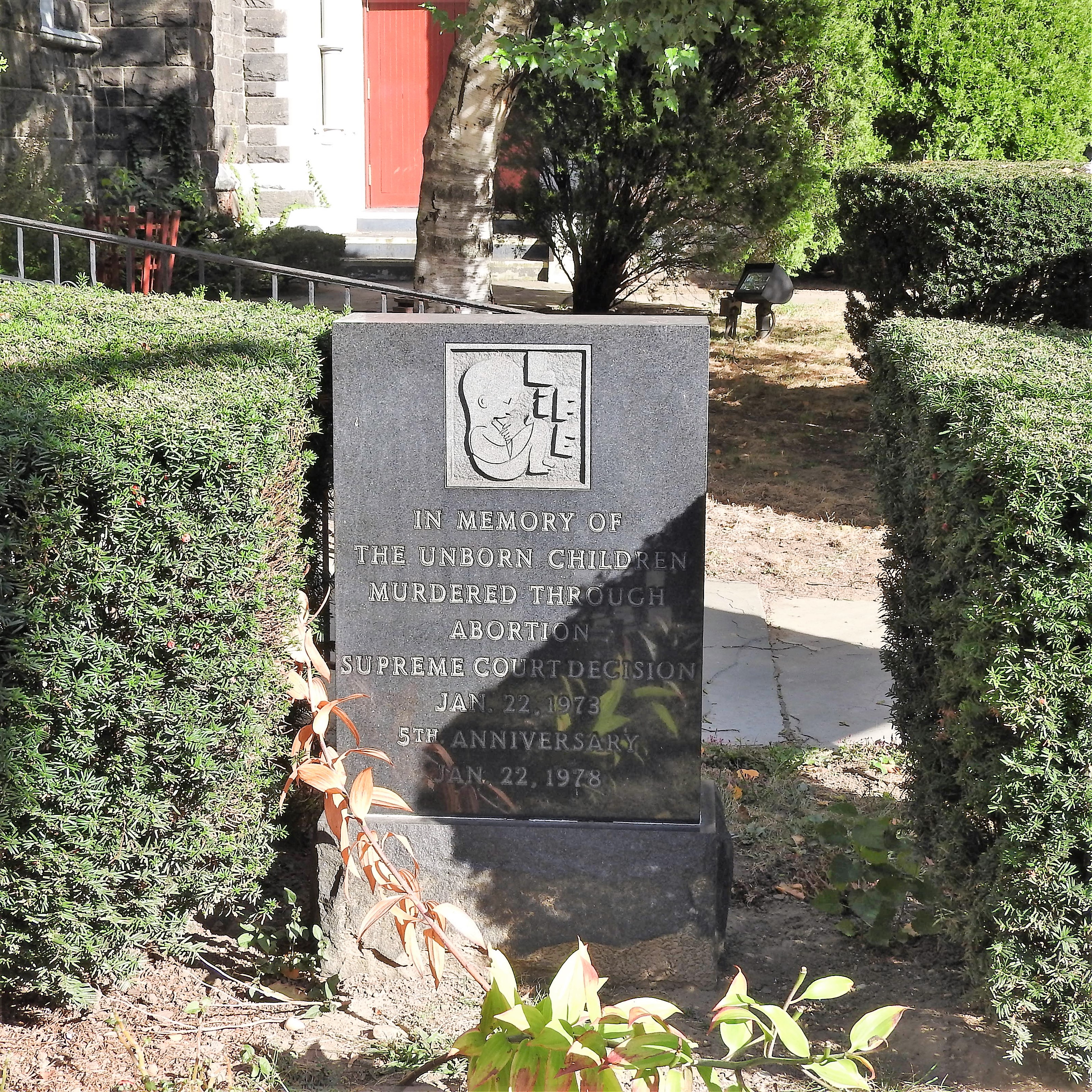
Anti-abortion monument of a parish church in Brooklyn, New York

The only coordinated opposition to abortion in the United States during the late 1960s and early 1970s before the Roe v. Wade decision was from the United States Conference of Catholic Bishops and its Family Life Bureau. Mobilization of a wide-scale anti-abortion movement began immediately after 1973 with the creation of the National Right to Life Committee (NRLC).

Before 1980, the Southern Baptist Convention officially advocated for loosening of abortion restrictions. During the 1971 and 1974 Southern Baptist Conventions, Southern Baptists were called upon "to work for legislation that will allow the possibility of abortion under such conditions as rape, incest, clear evidence of severe fetal deformity, and carefully ascertained evidence of the likelihood of damage to the emotional, mental, and physical health of the mother". W. Barry Garrett wrote in the Baptist Press, "Religious liberty, human equality and justice are advanced by the [Roe v. Wade] Supreme Court abortion decision." By 1980, conservative Protestant leaders became vocal in their opposition to legalized abortion, and by the early 1990s Pat Robertson's Christian Coalition of America became a significant anti-abortion organization. In 2005, Richard Land, president of the Southern Baptist Convention's Ethics and Religious Liberty Commission, said that making abortion illegal is more important than any other issue.

Much of the anti-abortion movement in the United States and around the world finds support in the Roman Catholic Church, the Christian right, the Lutheran Church–Missouri Synod and the Wisconsin Evangelical Lutheran Synod, the Church of England, the Anglican Church in North America, the Eastern Orthodox Church, and the Church of Jesus Christ of Latter-day Saints (LDS). However, the anti-abortion teachings of these denominations vary considerably. The Eastern Orthodox Church and Roman Catholic Church consider abortion to be immoral in all cases, but may in some cases permit an act which indirectly and without intent results in the death of the fetus in a case where the mother's life is threatened. In Pope John Paul II's Letter to Families, he simply stated the Roman Catholic Church's view on abortion and euthanasia: "Laws which legitimize the direct killing of innocent human beings through abortion or euthanasia are in complete opposition to the inviolable right to life proper to every individual; they thus deny the equality of everyone before the law."

The National Association of Evangelicals has adopted a number of resolutions stating its opposition to abortion, but "recognizes that there might be situations in which terminating a pregnancy is warranted – such as protecting the life of a mother or in cases of rape or incest". The position of the Church of Jesus Christ of Latter-day Saints (LDS Church) is that "elective abortion for personal or social convenience is contrary to the will and the commandments of God" but that abortion may be justified where the pregnancy endangers life of the mother, or where the pregnancy is the outcome of rape or incest. The Taskforce of United Methodists on Abortion and Sexuality (TUMAS) was formed in 1987 to further the anti-abortion ministry in The United Methodist Church. The Southern Baptist Convention believes that abortion is allowable only in cases where there is a direct threat to the life of the woman.

Among Mainline Protestant denominations, the Episcopal Church recognizes a right of a pregnant woman to terminate a pregnancy, but opposes "abortion as a means of birth control, family planning, sex selection or any reason of mere convenience". The United Church of Christ supports abortion rights, viewing it as a matter of reproductive health and justice. The Presbyterian Church (U.S.A.) adopts the view that abortion is a personal choice, but acknowledges "diverse conclusions and actions" within the church on the issue. The Evangelical Lutheran Church in America's position is that abortion prior to the point of viability "should not be prohibited by law or by lack of public funding" but that "abortion after the point of fetal viability should be prohibited except when the life of a mother is threatened or when fetal abnormalities pose a fatal threat to a newborn."

=== Consistent life ethic ===
Supporters of the consistent life ethic also oppose abortions as one of the acts that end human life. In 1979, Juli Loesch linked anti-abortion and anti-nuclear weapons arguments to form the group Pro Lifers for Survival. In 1987 this group defined an ethic of the sanctity of all life, and formed the group Seamless Garment Network. This group was against abortion, euthanasia, capital punishment, militarism, poverty and racism. Beginning in 1983, American Catholic Cardinal Joseph Bernardin argued that abortion, euthanasia, capital punishment, and unjust war are all related, and all wrong. He said that "to be truly 'pro-life,' you have to take all of those issues into account." Paul M. Perl studied 1996 voter statistics and found that the consistent life ethic is difficult for religious leaders to promote because it combines the generally conservative anti-abortion stance with a liberal social attitude.

=== Abolitionist groups ===
Abortion abolitionism is an absolutist position, often opposed to mainstream anti-abortion positions, which is largely incrementalist. Abortion abolitionism advocates for a complete ban on abortion of all kinds, including exceptional cases (such as for rape, incest, or preventing the likely death of the woman). Those who adhere to this view often differentiate themselves from the label "pro-life", saying that if abortion is murder then it is unjustifiable in all cases, and that the "pro-life" position is reformist.

Anti-abortion campaigners have made comparisons between abortion and slavery since the 1970s following the Roe v. Wade ruling by the U.S. Supreme Court. Many abortion abolitionists are conservative Christians and say that the Fourteenth Amendment to the United States Constitution entitles embryos and fetuses to equal protection from murder, which they believe abortion to be. In calling themselves "abolitionists", those in this movement intend to compare the rights of embryos and fetuses to the rights of chattel slaves, and say that their humanity is not counted as fully human by their contemporaries. Some abortion rights campaigners have criticized this comparison, saying that abortion abolitionists co-opt the imagery of the civil rights movement. Abolitionists say that the historic abolitionist position on slavery was once also seen as radical and unpopular.

Groups calling themselves abolitionist include the Mid-Atlantic Reformation Society, the Oklahoma-based organization Abolitionists Rising, End Abortion Now in Arizona, and Operation Save America, which have gained political support following overturning of Roe v. Wade in 2022. Some abolitionist groups filed amicus curiae briefs in support of the overturning of the decision. As of 2023 state legislators in almost 20 U.S. states had introduced abortion abolitionist bills, with some bills advocating capital punishment for anyone involved in an abortion. There are abolitionist campaign groups in 21 states, and abolition of abortion is included in the platform of the Republican Party of Texas.

== Legal and political aspects ==
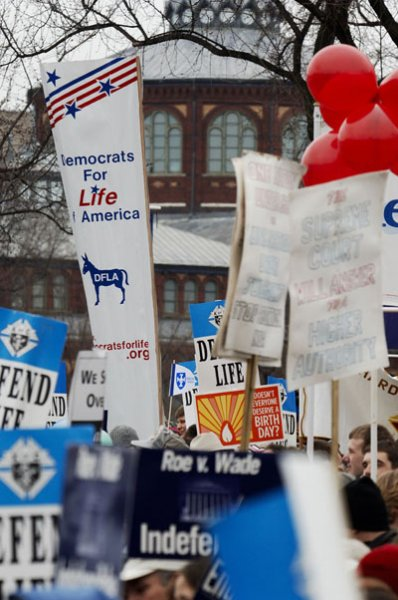
Democrats for Life of America demonstrates at the 2006 March for Life.

The Republican Party platform officially advocates an anti-abortion position, which developed alongside the modern anti-abortion movement. Before Roe v. Wade, the majority of Republicans were not anti-abortion, including most of the party's leadership, which typically cited abortion rights as included within an ideology of limited government and personal freedom. At the 1976 Republican National Convention, the party adopted an anti-abortion amendment as part of their platform, for strategic reasons. The party's leadership hoped to appeal to Catholics, a demographic which had traditionally voted Democratic, a party at the time containing fairly liberal economic views with mixed opinions on social ones, but who might be put off by growing cultural liberalism and who made up the core of the anti-abortion movement. Over time, the anti-abortion plank of the Republican platform became one rallying point for a growing conservative religious coalition in the party, which drove out many pro-choice Republicans and led to a long-term shift in the party's public image and identity.

However, there are some pro-choice Republicans. The Republican group The Wish List supports pro-choice Republican women just as EMILY's List supports pro-choice Democratic women. The Susan B. Anthony List (SBA List) is dedicated to "increasing the percentage of anti-abortion women in Congress and high public office," and seeks to eliminate abortion in the U.S. The Democrats for Life of America are a group of anti-abortion Democrats on the political left who advocate for an anti-abortion plank in the Democratic Party's platform and for anti-abortion Democratic candidates. Former vice-presidential candidate Sargent Shriver, the late Robert Casey, a former two-term governor of Pennsylvania, and former Rep. Bart Stupak (D-Mich), a former leader of the bipartisan anti-abortion caucus in the United States House of Representatives, have been among the most well-known anti-abortion Democrats. However, following his vote in favor of the Patient Protection and Affordable Care Act, Marjorie Dannenfelser of the SBA List reported that her organization was revoking an anti-abortion award it had been planning to give to Stupak, and anti-abortion organizations accused Stupak of having betrayed the anti-abortion movement.

The New York Times reported in 2011 that the anti-abortion movement in the United States had been undergoing a disagreement over tactics. Since Roe v. Wade was decided in 1973, the movement had usually focused on chipping away at Roe through incremental restrictions such as laws requiring parental consent or women to see sonograms, restricting late-term abortions, etc., with the goal of limiting abortions and changing "hearts and minds" until there is a majority on the Supreme Court to overturn Roe. However, some activists were calling for "an all-out legal assault on Roe. v. Wade", seeking the enactment of laws defining legal personhood as beginning at fertilization or prohibiting abortions after a fetal heartbeat is detectable at six to eight weeks in the hope that court challenges to such laws would lead the Supreme Court to overturn Roe v. Wade. Such activists believed that then-Justice Anthony Kennedy, who nearly decided to overturn Roe in Planned Parenthood v. Casey, was open to rethinking Roe. Others feared that such a legal challenge would result in the solidification of the 1973 decision in Roe. Evangelical Christian groups tended to be in the former camp and Catholic groups in the latter.

=== Death penalty ===
Among those who believe that abortion is murder, some believe it may be appropriate to punish it with death. While attempts to criminalize abortion generally focus on the doctor, Texas state Rep. Tony Tinderholt (R) introduced a bill in 2017 and 2019 that may enable the death penalty in Texas for women who have abortions, and the Ohio legislature considered a similar bill in 2018.

In March 2021, Texas state Rep. Bryan Slaton introduced a bill that would abolish abortion and make it a criminal act, whereby women and physicians who received and performed abortions, respectively, could receive the death penalty.

In 2023, South Carolinan Republican Representative Rob Harris authored the South Carolina Prenatal Equal Protection Act of 2023, which would make women who had abortions eligible for the death penalty. The bill attracted 21 Republican co-sponsors.

== Demographics ==
=== Within the movement ===
Studies indicate that activists within the American anti-abortion movement are predominantly white and religious. Scholars continue to dispute the primary factors that cause individuals to become anti-abortion activists. While some have suggested that a particular moral stance or worldview leads to activism, others have suggested that activism leads individuals to develop particular moral positions and worldviews.

A 1981 survey of dues paying members of the National Right to Life Committee (NRLC) by sociologist Donald O. Granberg found that survey respondents held conservative views on sex, sex education, and contraception. Additionally, Granberg's survey provided basic demographic characteristics of his sample: 98% of survey respondents were white, 63% were female, 58% had a college degree, and 70% were Catholic. Granberg concluded that conservative personal morality was the primary mechanism for explaining an individual's involvement in the anti-abortion movement.

A 2002 study by Carol J.C. Maxwell drawing on decades of survey and interview data of direct-action activists within the anti-abortion movement found that 99% of the sample was white, 60% was female, 51% had a college degree, and 29% were Catholic. Like Granberg's 1981 study, Maxwell concluded that anti-abortion and abortion-rights activists held two different worldviews which in turn are formed by two different moral centers.

In 2008, sociologist Ziad Munson studied the characteristics of both activists and non-activists who considered themselves anti-abortion. The anti-abortion activists of Munson's sample were 93% white, 57% female, 66% Catholic, and 71% had a college degree. Of non-activists who considered themselves anti-abortion, Munson found that 83% were white, 52% were female, 45% were Catholic, and 76% had a college degree. In Munson's analysis personal moralities and worldviews are formed as a consequence of participation in anti-abortion activism. Munson's analysis differs from previous scholarly work in its assertion that beliefs result from activism rather than causing activism. For Munson, life course factors make an individual more or less likely to become an activist.

=== Popular opinion ===
A 2019 Gallup poll found that men and women in the United States generally hold similar abortion views: "19% of both men and women say abortion should be totally illegal; 31% of women and 26% of men want abortion to be totally legal." In addition, 53% of men and 48% of women favored abortion being legal, but only under certain circumstances.

Gallup polling in 2019 found that 25% of Americans believe abortion should be legal under any circumstances; 13%, under most circumstances; 39%, under only a few circumstances; and 21%, under no circumstances. A 2020 poll by the Associated Press-NORC Center for Public Affairs Research similarly found that 37% of Americans believed abortion should be legal under only a few circumstances. This answer was provided by 45% of Catholics and 67% of white evangelical Protestants.

In the Gallup poll, when respondents were first asked about the legality of abortion, 49% described themselves as "pro-life" and 46% as "pro-choice". However, among people who were not asked about legality first, 43% described themselves as "pro-life" and 52% as "pro-choice". Gallup's 2019 polling also found that 50% of Americans believe abortion to be morally wrong, while 42% believe it to be morally acceptable, and 6% believe that it depends on the situation. When asked whether the Supreme Court should reverse their 1973 decision of Roe v. Wade, 60% opined that the Court should not, while only 33% said that it should. Polling in 2020 revealed that 32% of Americans are either very or somewhat satisfied about abortion policies as they currently stand, while 24% report being dissatisfied and desire stricter policies and another 22% also express dissatisfaction but desire less strict policies.

According to a 2013 Gallup poll, 15% of Americans with no religious identity are anti-abortion and slight majorities of Catholics, Protestants, Southerners, seniors and nonwhites reported as anti-abortion. A 2019 Gallup poll found that Mormons, the Southern Baptist Convention, and Jehovah's Witnesses have the highest majorities who believe abortion should be illegal in all or most cases, while atheists, agnostics, and Jews have the highest majorities who think the reverse.

== Controversies over terminology ==
Anti-abortion advocates tend to use terms such as "unborn baby", "unborn child", or "pre-born child", and see the medical terms "embryo", "zygote", and "fetus" as dehumanizing.

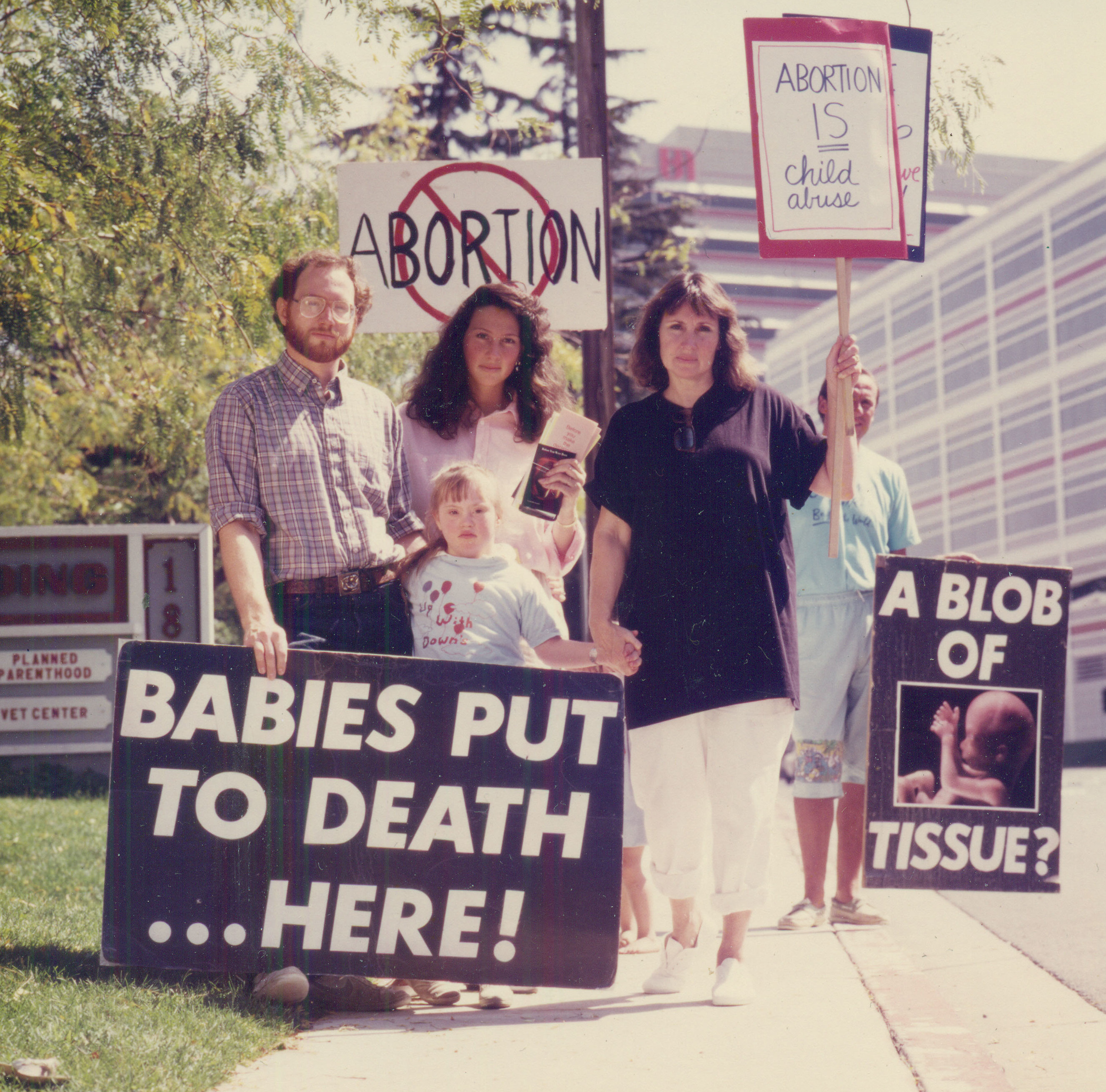
Protest outside clinic in the Bay Area, 1986

Both "pro-choice" and "pro-life" are examples of terms labeled as political framing: they are terms which purposely try to define their philosophies in the best possible light, while by definition attempting to describe their opposition in the worst possible light. "Pro-choice" implies that the alternative viewpoint is "anti-choice", while "pro-life" implies the alternative viewpoint is "pro-death" or "anti-life". In part due to this viewpoint, the Associated Press encourages journalists to use the terms "abortion rights" and "anti-abortion".

In a 2009 Gallup Poll, a majority of U.S. adults (51%) called themselves "pro-life" on the issue of abortion—for the first time since Gallup began asking the question in 1995—while 42% identified themselves as "pro-choice", although pro-choice groups noted that acceptance of the "pro-life" label did not in all cases indicate opposition to legalized abortion, and that another recent poll had indicated that an equal number were pro-choice.

A March 2011 Rasmussen Reports poll concluded that Americans are "closely divided between those who call themselves pro-life" and those who consider themselves as "pro-choice". In a February 2011 Rasmussen Reports poll of "Likely U.S. Voters", fifty percent view themselves as "pro-choice" and forty percent "say they are pro-life". In a July 2013 Rasmussen Reports poll of "Likely U.S. Voters", 46 percent view themselves as "pro-choice" and 43 percent "say they are pro-life".

== Methods and activities ==
=== Demonstrations and protests ===
- Mass demonstrations: every year, American anti-abortion advocates hold a March for Life in Washington, D.C., on January 22, the anniversary date of the Roe v. Wade Supreme Court decision legalizing abortion in the United States. The event typically draws tens of thousands of attendees and, since 2003, frequently features notable politicians as speakers. Similar events take place on a smaller scale in other U.S. cities, such as the Walk for Life in San Francisco, California.
- The life chain: The "Life Chain" is a public demonstration technique that involves standing in a row on sidewalks holding signs bearing anti-abortion messages. Messages include "Abortion Kills Children", "Abortion stops a beating heart" or "Abortion Hurts Women". Participants, as an official policy, do not yell or chant slogans and do not block pedestrians or roadways. Many Right to Life chapters hold Life Chain events yearly and the annual worldwide 40 Days for Life campaigns also use this technique.
- The rescue: A "rescue operation" involves anti-abortion activists blocking the entrances to an abortion clinic in order to prevent anyone from entering. The stated goal of this practice is to force the clinic to shut down for the day. Often, the protesters are removed by law enforcement. Some clinics were protested so heavily in this fashion that they closed down permanently. "The rescue" was first attempted by Operation Rescue. Ever since President Bill Clinton signed the Freedom of Access to Clinic Entrances Act into law, the rescue has become prohibitively expensive, and has rarely been attempted.
- The truth display: Involves publicly displaying large pictures of aborted fetuses. Some anti-abortion groups believe that showing the graphic results of abortion is an effective way to dissuade and prevent others from choosing abortion. The Pro-Life Action League has used this form of activism in its Face the Truth displays. Members of one group, Survivors of the Abortion Holocaust, are known for setting up truth displays on university campuses. This group has faced legal battles over the use of such graphic imagery, and they have generated debate regarding the protection of such displays, by freedom of speech. "Truth displays" are controversial, even within the anti-abortion movement.
- Picketing: The majority of the facilities that perform abortions in the United States experience some form of protest from anti-abortion demonstrators every year, of which the most common form is picketing. The National Abortion Federation tracked 114,093 instances of such picketing in 2021.

=== Counseling ===
- Sidewalk counseling: "Sidewalk counseling" is a form of anti-abortion advocacy which is conducted outside of abortion clinics. Activists seek to communicate with those entering the building, or with passersby in general, in an effort to persuade them not to have an abortion or to reconsider their position on the morality of abortion. They do so by trying to engage in conversation, displaying signs, distributing literature, or giving directions to a nearby crisis pregnancy center.
  - The "Chicago Method" is an approach to sidewalk counseling that involves giving those about to enter an abortion facility copies of lawsuits filed against the facility or its physicians. The name comes from the fact that it was first used by Pro-Life Action League in Chicago. The intent of the Chicago Method is to turn the woman away from a facility that the protesters deem "unsafe", thus giving her time to reconsider her choice to abort. Sidewalk counseling originated in the 1970s and 1980s as a direct tactic then over time evolved into a "woman centered" approach. In this view it presents counselors as supportive helpers trying to save women from being forced into getting an abortion.
- Crisis pregnancy centers: "Crisis pregnancy centers" are non-profit organizations, mainly in the United States, established to persuade pregnant women against having an abortion. These centers are typically run by anti-abortion Christians according to a conservative Christian philosophy, and they often disseminate false medical information, usually but not exclusively about the supposed health risks and mental health risks of abortion. The centers usually provide peer counseling against abortion, and sometimes also offer adoption referrals or baby supplies. Most are not licensed and do not provide medical services, though some offer sonograms, claiming that women who see such sonograms decide not to have an abortion. Legal and legislative action regarding CPCs has generally attempted to curb false or deceptive advertising undertaken in pursuit of the anti-abortion cause. Several thousand CPCs exist in the United States, often operating in affiliation with one of three umbrella organizations (Care Net, Heartbeat International, and Birthright International), with hundreds in other countries. By 2006, U.S. CPCs had received more than $60 million of federal funding, including some funding earmarked for abstinence-only programs, as well as state funding from many states. Ethicists contend that CPCs undermine key principles of medical ethics, such as patient autonomy and informed consent. By using clinical attire, diagnostic tools like ultrasounds, and formal paperwork, these centers project the appearance of a healthcare clinic without providing licensed or comprehensive services. As a result, patients often experience delays in receiving abortion or prenatal care, a burden that impacts low-income and vulnerable groups most heavily. However, because CPCs typically offer free services under the umbrella of religious outreach, their operations are widely shielded by First Amendment free speech protections, keeping them largely clear of standard healthcare regulations and consumer oversight.

=== Specialty license plates ===
In the United States, some states issue specialty license plates that have an anti-abortion theme. Choose Life, an advocacy group founded in 1997, was successful in securing an anti-abortion automobile tag in Florida. Subsequently, the organization has been actively helping groups in other states pursue "Choose Life" license plates.

== Abortion health risk claims ==
Some anti-abortion organizations and individuals disseminate false medical information and unsupported pseudoscientific claims about alleged physical and mental health risks of abortion. Many right-to-life organizations claim that abortion damages future fertility, or causes breast cancer, which is contradicted by the medical professional organizations. Some states, such as Alaska, Mississippi, West Virginia, Texas, and Kansas, have passed laws requiring abortion providers to warn patients of a link between abortion and breast cancer, and to issue other scientifically unsupported warnings.

Some right-to-life advocacy groups allege a link between abortion and subsequent mental-health problems. Some U.S. state legislatures have mandated that patients be told that abortion increases their risk of depression and suicide, despite the fact that such risks are not supported by the bulk of the scientific literature, and are contradicted by mainstream organizations of mental-health professionals such as the American Psychological Association.

== Violence ==
Violent incidents directed against abortion providers have included arson and bombings of abortion clinics, and murders or attempted murders of physicians and clinic staff, especially the doctors that provide abortions. Acts of violence against abortion providers and facilities in North America have largely subsided following a peak in the mid-1990s which included the murders of Drs. David Gunn, John Britton, and Barnett Slepian and the attempted murder of Dr. George Tiller. Tiller was later murdered in his church in 2009.

As of 1995, nearly all anti-abortion leaders said that they condemned the use of violence in the movement, describing it as an aberration and saying that no one in their organizations was associated with acts of violence. A small extremist element of the movement in the US supports, raises money for, and attempts to justify anti-abortion violence, including murders of abortion workers, which this fringe element calls "justifiable homicides". An example of such an organization is the Army of God.

== See also ==
- Abortion law
- Anti-abortion movements
- Partial-Birth Abortion Ban Act
- Philosophical aspects of the abortion debate
- 180, a 2011 anti-abortion documentary
