= National Institute of Family and Life Advocates =

US nonprofit organization

The National Institute of Family and Life Advocates (NIFLA) is an American 501(c)(3) charitable organization that seeks to provide alternates to abortions for U.S. women.

Founded in 1993, it is based in Fredericksburg, Virginia and has the aim of "developing a network of life-affirming ministries in every community across the nation in order to achieve an abortion-free America." A member of the National Pro-Life Religious Council, the organization provides legal advice to more than 1,350 crisis pregnancy centers (CPCs) within its membership network. The bulk of CPCs in the US are affiliated with NIFLA, Care Net and Heartbeat International. The organization's 2009 IRS Form 990 stated that the group spent $759,259 in annual advocacy expenses.

In 2004, Focus on the Family started the Option Ultrasound Program, which along with NIFLA, funds medical consultants to obtain ultrasound machines for crisis pregnancy centers and converts them to medical-style clinics. 1,000 of their members are medical clinics that use ultrasounds. Hundreds of CPCs have become medical clinics through NIFLA's Life Choice Project, which increases the number of women going to the clinics, including those described by the organization as "abortion-minded."

Its founder and president is Thomas Glessner. NIFLA provides legal counsel to CPCs as well as medical training, having trained over 2,500 nurses in ultrasound use. NIFLA publishes two monthly newsletters aimed at CPCs, Legal Tips and "Clinic Tips" as well as a quarterly publication, The Life Sentinel. NIFLA also works with an insurance company that secures insurance for CPCs.

== See also ==
- Care Net
- Heartbeat International
- National Institute of Family and Life Advocates v. Becerra
