= Thomas Glessner =

American lawyer

Thomas Glessner is an American lawyer and the president of the National Institute of Family and Life Advocates (NIFLA), a public interest law firm founded in 1993.

Glessner served as the executive director of the Christian Action Council (now Care Net) from 1987 to 1992, establishing legal guidelines and programs for training board members and directors of pregnancy resource centers (PRCs) throughout the nation. In the 1990s, under his leadership, the Christian Action Council called for a boycott of a number of companies that supported Planned Parenthood, a provider of abortion services. As the CEO of NIFLA, Glessner also developed and implemented legal guidelines for PRCs, enabling them to convert their operations into licensed medical clinics and provide services such as ultrasound.

Glessner has been listed in Who's Who in American Law and is the author of Achieving an Abortion Free America (Multnomah publishing, 1990),Destiney's Team: A Story About Love, Choices and Eternity(Anomalos Publishing, 2007), and a fiction novel, The Emerging Brave New World (Anomalos Publishing, 2008).

Thomas Glessner graduated from the University of Washington School of Law in Seattle in 1977, and practiced law in the Seattle area for ten years. As a practicing attorney, he represented pro-life organizations and PRCs. He founded and led four pregnancy resource centers in Seattle from 1981 to 1987.

Glessner is a member of the bar associations for the United States Supreme Court, the State of Virginia and the State of Washington. In addition, he has filed several "friend of the court" briefs in significant cases for the pro-life movement in the United States Supreme Court. He also sits on the board of directors for the National Religious Pro-life Coalition.
