= Misinformation related to abortion =

False or misleading information about abortion

Misinformation related to abortion pertains to incorrect or misleading information related to abortion and its implications, including its medical, legal and societal effects. Misinformation and disinformation related to abortion often stems from political, religious and social groups, particularly on social media, as well as crisis pregnancy centers. Crisis pregnancy centers exist to influence pregnant women not to have an abortion and have been shown to provide misinformation.

Abortion misinformation can negatively impact public opinion, access to abortion services and policy-making. Misinformation can also divert pregnant people from accessing safe and timely care from appropriately trained medical practitioners, leading to severe long-term complications and/or death. Misinformation can also affect medical training received by physicians in terms of altering their learning. Abortion misinformation can also lead to confusion and societal stigma for those procuring or undergoing the procedure.

== Commonly propagated misinformation ==
=== Misconceptions/myths on abortion ===
Claim	Refutation
Abortion is a dangerous procedure	When performed by trained providers in developed countries, abortion is among the safest procedures in medicine. The complications related to childbirth are more common and serious than the complications related to abortion.
Abortion pills are unsafe	Medication abortion is both safe and effective for when taken as directed by regulated healthcare bodies. The risk of death for medication abortion is about fourteen times less than the risk of giving birth.
Herbal medicine can help provide safe abortion	There is no sufficient scientific evidence showing any herbal products being able to provide safe abortion. In fact, use of some herbs for abortion might cause serious health problems. Additionally, if the abortion effort was unsuccessful, some herbal medication can cause lasting damage to the fetus if it is brought to term.
Undergoing abortion increases the risk for breast cancer	Neither induced abortions nor miscarriages raise the risk of breast cancer.
Abortion will result in negative mental health outcomes	There is no increased risk of mental health problems compared to women who deliver an unwanted pregnancy. (See Abortion and mental health)
There is an increased risk of fertility problems after abortion	Most women will not experience infertility or problematic pregnancies after undergoing an abortion. Abortion does not substantially increase the risk of infertility, pregnancy-related hypertension, or most other complications in future pregnancies. Higher risks of very preterm birth may occur if there were multiple prior aspiration abortions or if conception happens within six months after an abortion.
All embryos and fetuses can feel pain	The prevailing viewpoint among most medical organizations is that fetal pain is not possible in embryos or fetuses younger than 24 weeks of gestation due to the connection between the thalamus and cortex of the brain of the fetus not being fully developed until the 24th week of gestation.
Abortion is a rare procedure	Abortion is a very common procedure with over 73 million of them taking place per year worldwide. Approximately 60% of all unintended pregnancies end in an induced abortion. In the United States, nearly 1 in 4 women will have undergone an abortion before 45 years of age. Each year, hundreds of thousands of more abortions happen in the US than other surgeries like appendicectomy or hysterectomy.

== Extent and scope ==
=== Digital platforms ===
Digital platforms have often been a source of misinformation regarding abortion. A 2014 investigation into the websites of crisis pregnancy centers revealed that 80% of these sites disseminated inaccurate information, frequently perpetuating unfounded myths about the health risks associated with abortion. An additional study that analyzed data for 36 crisis pregnancy center websites in North Carolina found that 31 out of 36 made misinformation available to those accessing their site.

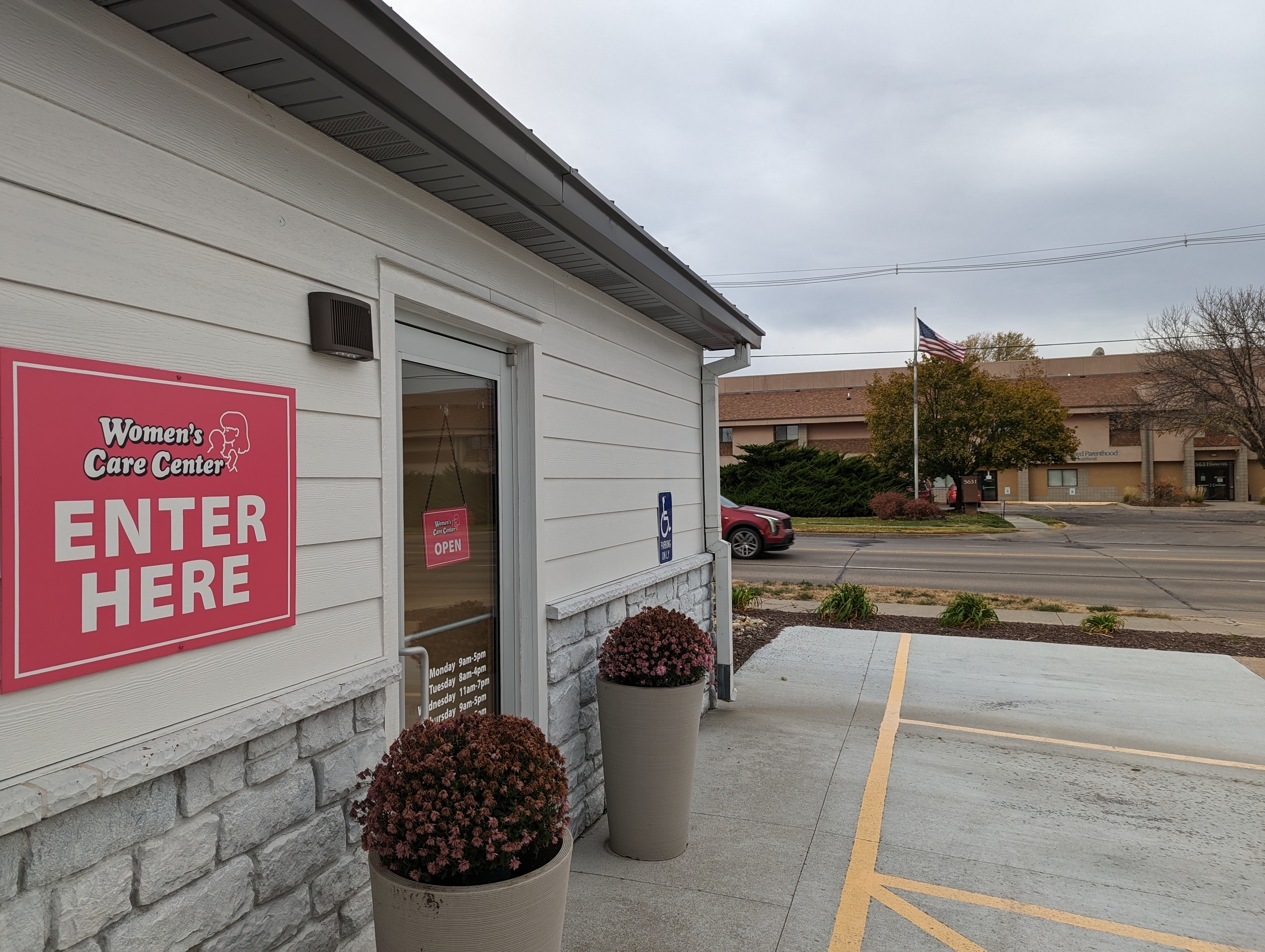
Lincoln, Nebraska Crisis Pregnancy Center on 48th Street

Another study analyzing the first five results from Google searches related to abortion medication found the majority of these pages propagated similar misinformation. Common inaccuracies on these web pages include claims that abortion medication can lead to mental illness, adversely affect fertility, or elevate mortality risk, despite none of those things being backed up by science.

A report from the Guttmacher Institute showed that information presented in the state health departments of the United States sometimes contain inaccurate or incomplete information, including out-of-date and biased information. The same report and another study showed that an overwhelming majority of the crisis pregnancy centers provided misleading information related to abortion. Conducting an analysis of crisis pregnancy centers in North Carolina found that they offered misinformation on abortions concerning their connections to health problems, including breast cancer, to women that visited. 26% of the North Carolina crisis pregnancy centers analyzed in the study supplied misleading information between abortion and infertility, along with abortion and issues pertaining to mental health.

=== Social media ===
Reproductive healthcare topics, including abortion, have been confined online in terms of what content can be shared surrounding the topics. A narrative review of preexisting literature found that 1/3 of misinformation related to associations with unattributed risks, 23% of recommendations were not akin to professional advice, and 14% encouraged the use of alternative methods for medicine.

A study showed that 36.5% of the posts related to abortion on Instagram contained misinformation. Out of the misinformation posts containing medical information, 84.2% were anti-abortion. Around 97% of misinformation posts were created by non-medical providers.

Facebook ads for abortion reversal, an unproven and unsafe medical procedure, deliberately targeted women and girls as young as 13 and have been shown to Facebook users up to 18.4 million times. Google also placed ads for abortion reversal in as much as 83% of the searches related to abortion.

== Effects ==
=== Lawmaking ===
Misinformation related to abortion among healthcare professionals and legislators may lead to abortion legislation being written vaguely or inaccurately. The recent overturning of Roe v. Wade has impacted abortion laws in the states, thus making it unknown how those experiencing unanticipated complications, or serious cases of unwanted pregnancies, will be treated in certain geographical areas and whether they will have the ability to receive an abortion. Following the overturning of Roe v. Wade, reproductive care, prenatal care, and fetal care, among other maternal care methods, could be affected in certain states depending on news laws being implemented. In part due to misinformation related to abortion, in some states, abortion has been heavily criminalized, including becoming classified as a felony that could carry heavy jail time. John Becker, an Ohio lawmaker, introduced a bill that would subject doctors to murder charges if they did not do everything possible to save the life of fetus - specifically including trying to re-implant an ectopic pregnancy, despite that not being scientifically possible. Becker later stated he had not researched ectopic pregnancies before writing the bill.

Confusing information related to abortion may also cause physicians to deny abortions in instances where the patient's complications are considered to not have met the legal threshold for "life threatening," with several pregnant people dying because of delated care.

=== Medical training ===
Abortion misinformation results in physicians getting less opportunities or having less incentives to practice abortion care, resulting in fewer physicians qualifying for performing procedural abortions. A lack of medical training regarding abortion hinders future physician's learning of required skills that are necessary when dealing with complications pertaining to pregnancy.

=== Public confusion ===
The impact of abortion misinformation is wide-reaching, influencing individuals across the spectrum of beliefs about abortion. Marginalized communities often face heightened adverse effects from abortion misinformation due to their higher abortion rates, reduced access to healthcare, lower levels of health literacy, limited access to reliable health information, and a diminished trust in healthcare providers, as well as due to a prolonged history of systemic racism in healthcare.

A survey found that 67% of "pro-choice" respondents and 88% of "pro-life" respondents believed that childbirth is either safer or as safe as undergoing an abortion. Contrary to these beliefs, childbirth's mortality rate is considerably higher, ranging between 50 and 130 times greater than that of abortion.

About 25 to 30% of American women will have an abortion at some point in their lives. However, highly educated and higher-income Americans are likely to believe that abortion is rare. Among Americans without a college degree, 54% underestimate abortion rates, compared with 70% of those with graduate degrees. The frequency of abortion is underestimated by 67% of men and 57% of women. Low income and less educated women, the group that is more likely to undergo an abortion, were more likely to estimate the abortion rates correctly.

=== Physician safety ===
Due to the high prevalence of abortion infodemic, physicians who speak publicly about abortion have been targeted and harassed. Physicians providing abortion services may face stigma in the workplace, in their communities, and from colleagues.

Additionally, danger has risen for physicians who perform abortion, such as arson causing the burning down of several clinics. Several medical providers and volunteers have suffered injuries or death from forms of violence such as shooting and bombs over the years:
