= Zauderer v. Office of Disciplinary Counsel of Supreme Court of Ohio =

- Supreme Court of the United States

Argued January 7, 1985 Decided May 28, 1985
- Full case name: Zauderer v. Office of Disciplinary Counsel of Supreme Court of Ohio
- Citations: 471 U.S. 626 (more) 105 S. Ct. 2265; 85 L. Ed. 2d 652

Case history
- Prior: Office of Disciplinary Counsel v. Zauderer, 10 Ohio St. 3d 44, 461 N.E.2d 883 (1984); probable jurisdiction noted, 469 U.S. 813 (1984).

Holding
- A State may require advertisers to include "purely factual and uncontroversial" disclosures without violating the First Amendment rights of the advertiser as long as the disclosure is in the State's interest in preventing deception of consumers.

Court membership
- Chief Justice Warren E. Burger Associate Justices William J. Brennan Jr. · Byron White; Thurgood Marshall · Harry Blackmun; Lewis F. Powell Jr. · William Rehnquist; John P. Stevens · Sandra Day O'Connor

Case opinions
- Majority: White, joined by Blackmun, Stevens (in full), Brennan, Marshall (Parts I, II, III, and IV), Burger, Rehnquist, O'Connor (Parts I, II, V, and VI)
- Concur/dissent: Brennan, joined by Marshall
- Concur/dissent: O'Connor, joined by Burger, Rehnquist

Zauderer v. Office of Disciplinary Counsel of Supreme Court of Ohio, 471 U.S. 626 (1985), was a United States Supreme Court case in which the Court held that states can require an advertiser to disclose certain information without violating the advertiser's First Amendment free speech protections as long as the disclosure requirements are reasonably related to the State's interest in preventing deception of consumers. The decision effected identified that some commercial speech may have weaker First Amendment free speech protections than non-commercial speech and that states can compel such commercial speech to protect their interests; future cases have relied on the "Zauderer standard" to determine the constitutionality of state laws that compel commercial speech as long as the information to be disclosed is "purely factual and uncontroversial".

== Background ==
Philip Q. Zauderer was an attorney practicing in Columbus, Ohio. To expand his business, in 1981, he had an advertisement printed in The Columbus Citizen-Journal offering to represent clients charged with drunk driving, with language stating that their legal fees would be refunded if they were convicted of drunk driving. On the second day the ad was run, the Office of Disciplinary Counsel for the Supreme Court of Ohio contacted Zauderer, stating that the ad appeared to suggest he would represent criminal defendants on a contingent-fee basis, which violated the state's Code of Professional Responsibility. Zauderer immediately withdrew the ad and stated he would not take any cases from people responding to the ad.

Later, in 1982, Zauderer took another advertisement in several Ohio newspapers, this time offering his services on a contingent-fee basis for any women that may have been injured by the Dalkon Shield intrauterine device. His ad included an illustration of the Dalkon Shield, and descriptive language of the alleged injuries that women may have suffered from the device. While the ad successfully drew him clients, the Office of Disciplinary Counsel took further issue with this ad, and formally filed a complaint against Zauderer resulting from ads for violating several Ohio Disciplinary Rules. Among several complaints, the Office specifically called to the illustration and language that Zauderer used within the Dalkon ad as failing to be "dignified". Other violations asserted by the state including the misleading information on the drunk driving ad, how he offered his services in the Dalkon ad, and choice of language to represent his contingent-fee basis, including omission that clients may still be liable for costs, in and above attorney fees, even if they would lose the case. The Office specifically noted that they did not consider other information and advice in the Dalkon ad to be fraudulent or misleading.

At his hearing at the Board of Commissioners on Grievances and Discipline for the Ohio Supreme Court, Zauderer stated that Ohio's Disciplinary Rules related to the content of advertisements violated his rights to advertise under the First Amendment, as previously decided by Bates v. State Bar of Arizona, 433 U.S. 350 (1977), and In re R.M.J., 455 U.S. 191 (1982). The Board rejected Zauderer's defense, and on his appeal, the Supreme Court of Ohio upheld the conclusions from the Board, specifically noting that Bates and In re R.M.J. were aimed towards preventing deceptive advertising. The Supreme Court of Ohio also stated that In re R.M.J. suggested that states could regulate non-deceptive advertising to serve a narrow state interest; in this case, requiring disclosure of contingent-fee arrangements was deemed necessary by the state to assure potential clients would not misled.

== Supreme Court ==
Zauderer petitioned to the Supreme Court on several issues raised by the case, which accepted the case and heard oral arguments on January 7, 1985. The Court issued its decision on May 25, 1985. While the Court reversed some of the disciplinary actions against Zauderer by the Supreme Court of Ohio, it affirmed that court's decision that the state could regulate commercial speech. With Justice Lewis F. Powell Jr. not participating in the case, the opinion of a generally-unanimous count was written by Justice Byron White, joined in full by Justices Blackmun and Stevens, and in part by Brennan and Marshall (both who joined a concurrence in part and dissent in part) and in part by Burger, Rehnquist and O'Connor (who also joined in a separate concurrence in part and dissent in part).

The principal matter of Zauderer centered on the requirement of Ohio's Disciplinary Rules for disclosure of contingent-fee arrangements. White wrote:

The State has attempted only to prescribe what shall be orthodox in commercial advertising, and its prescription has taken the form of a requirement that appellant include in his advertising purely factual and uncontroversial information about the terms under which his services will be available. Because the extension of First Amendment protection to commercial speech is justified principally by the value to consumers of the information such speech provides, appellant's constitutionally protected interest in not providing any particular factual information in his advertising is minimal. . . . [B]ecause disclosure requirements trench much more narrowly on an advertiser's interests than do flat prohibitions on speech, “warning[s] or disclaimer[s] might be appropriately required . . . in order to dissipate the possibility of consumer confusion or deception.

Due to this reasoning, the Court upheld the disciplinary action against Zauderer for failing to disclose the contingent-fee terms from both ads, while following similar logic, found that the state had no protected interest against the use of factual illustrative material nor claims of representation, and overturned the Office's actions on these points.

== Impact ==
Zauderer has led to the establishment of the "Zauderer standard" to determine when a state's interest in compelling parts of commercial speech is valid. This test employs the "purely factual and uncontroversial information" language from the Zauderer decision to judge if such disclosure requirements are constitutional compelled commercial speech. The standard is frequently used in cases involving the labeling of food or other products.

The Zauderer standard has generally been held for when the government is seeking to prevent deception, but within the 21st century, a number of cases heard at the Circuit courts have considered the Zauderer standard applied to government language that is not strictly to prevent deception, creating a precedent. Such cases include:

- American Meat Institute v. USDA, held in the D.C. Appeals Court, found that Zauderer applied to the government's demand for meat packagers to include the country of origin of their product on packaging, even when considering the result of Central Hudson Gas & Electric Corp. v. Public Service Commission, 447 U.S. 557 (1980).
- National Electrical Manufacturers Association v. Sorrell, held in the Second Circuit, found that Zauderer applied to the addition of disclosure labels warning consumers that fluorescent light bulbs contained mercury and should be disposed as hazardous waste.
- CTIA—The Wireless Association v. City of Berkeley, held in the Ninth Circuit, used Zauderer to justify the constitutionality of city laws requiring cell phone providers to warn users about potentially receiving higher-than-recommended levels of radiation if they keep their cell phone in their pockets.

The Supreme Court case of National Institute of Family and Life Advocates v. Becerra 585 U.S. ___ (2018) established that there is a limit to how much Zauderer can apply; the Court ruled that required signage to be posted at crisis pregnancy centers notifying potential patients of state-provided abortion services did not fall under the Zauderer standard as it was unjustified and imposed a burden on a specific targeted set of speakers. The Court subsequently ordered the CTIA case, which had been petitioned to the Supreme Court, to be reconsidered in light of the National Institute of Family and Life Advocates decision. The appeals court reconsidered and reaffirmed its previous conclusion, stating that Berkeley's warning is “literally true,” promotes public health and does not require retailers to post messages that violate their beliefs. The Supreme Court then rejected a subsequent telecommunications industry challenge.
