= Wisconsin Family Council =

Nonprofit group

- Established: 1986
- Tax ID no.: 39-1556433 (EIN)
- Headquarters: 2801 International Lane, Madison, Wisconsin
- Key people: Julaine Appling, CEO
- Revenue: $226,342 (2017)
- Website: wifamilycouncil.org

Wisconsin Family Council (WFC) is an American 501(c)(3) group that advocates for Christian fundamentalist policy. WFC's Madison, Wisconsin headquarters also house its 501(c)(4) government lobbying arm, Wisconsin Family Action. It was founded as Family Research Institute of Wisconsin by Marvin Munyon in 1986, patterned on the Family Research Institute.

The organization got its start advocating for corporal punishment in religious schools and opposing laws granting rights to children. It has since expanded to opposing sex education, campaigning against same-sex marriage, and opposing laws designed to punish sexual abuse in churches.

Today WFC is a Family Policy Council, an organization affiliated with Focus on the Family and the Family Research Council.

== History ==
In 1986, founder Marvin Munyon left his job as an assistant principal at Calvary Baptist School in Watertown, Wisconsin, and founded WFC's predecessor organization later that year. A 1991 CNN broadcast about Munyon's time at the school reported that several former students alleged they suffered abuse, notably beatings, at the hands of Munyon.

Stating in 1987 that "youngsters subjected to corporal punishment in Christian schools are taught discipline and respect for authority", Munyon lead the organization to oppose Senate Bill 163, the first of many campaigns in support of legal corporal punishment in religious schools. In the 1990s, WFC opposed Assembly Bill 387 and Senate Bill 501, laws intended to grant children rights and to allow termination of parental rights for parents who abused or neglected their children.

WFC campaigned for a 2006 amendment to the Wisconsin Constitution that would make gay marriage illegal, and supported a provision to imprison gays for up to 9 months, and fine them up to $10,000, for attempting to marry outside of the state. WFC's campaign was successful; the referendum prohibiting same-sex marriage passed in the 2006 general election.

In addition to opposing gay marriage, WFC set about making it more difficult for heterosexual couples to get divorced. WFC CEO Julaine Appling said "that marriage is indeed under attack and no-fault divorce is one of those attacks."

In 2009, Wisconsin began to allow same-sex couples to form domestic partnerships so that they could enjoy some of the shared rights of married couples. WFC filed a lawsuit to stop the domestic partnerships. Appling complained that government officials were "pandering to a marginal group of people and we're challenging that in court."

In 2010, WFC collaborated with Juneau County District Attorney Scott Southworth in an attempt to criminally prosecute teachers for teaching state-mandated comprehensive sex education. Governor Jim Doyle, who had signed the sex education law, described the attempted prosecutions as "an unusual argument to make: Follow the law and I'll prosecute you."

In 2017, WFC opposed legislation to make it easier to prosecute clergy members who molest children and to sue religious organizations for failing to deal with abusers.

The Wisconsin State Capitol flew the rainbow flag for the first time in recognition of Pride month in 2019. Wisconsin Family Council collected signatures for a petition to remove the flag. WFC's CEO Appling said that only a flag that "represents everyone in the state" should be flown at the Capitol. She claims that the POW/MIA flag, which the building sometimes flies, represented everyone, unlike the Pride flag, which represented "a very narrow special interest group". Ten thousand people signed the petition.

In August 2019, WFC opposed a birth control access law. The law was introduced by pro-life Republican lawmakers who intend it to reduce abortion.

On 8 May 2022, the offices of the group were targeted in an arson attack. A Molotov cocktail was thrown through a window which failed to ignite, after which the arsonists set fire to the building. Graffiti slogans were sprayed on the building, including references to anarchy and Jane's Revenge, a recently formed militant, extremist group.
