= Abortion and the Catholic Church in the United States =

The Catholic Church and abortion in the United States deals with the views and activities of the Catholic Church in the United States in relation to the abortion debate. The Catholic Church opposes abortion and has campaigned against abortion in the United States, both saying that it is immoral and making statements and taking actions in opposition to its classification as legal.

A majority Catholics in the United States disagree with the official position promulgated by the Church, with 59% of Catholics supporting legal abortion in all or most cases. This upward trend in Catholic support for legal abortion aligns with a broader shift in American society. The gap between Catholic clergy and laity views is even more pronounced among Catholics of color, with 73% supporting the right to have an abortion. There is a distinction between practicing Catholics and non-practicing Catholics on the issue; practicing Catholics, are far more likely to be anti-abortion, while non-practicing Catholics are more likely to be in favor of abortion legalization.

Into the 21st century, the church's opposition to abortion, and specifically the actions it has taken against pro-abortion rights Catholics, has often been the subject of controversy.

== History ==
=== 19th century ===
In the latter half of the 19th century, the Catholic Church in the United States took the lead in denouncing what it termed "criminal abortion". The Michigan State Medical Society journal reported in 1870 that, while most churches were "neglecting" the subject of abortion, Catholic priests were teaching that "destruction of the embryo at any period from the first instant of conception is a crime equal in guilt to that of murder," and "that to admit its practice is to open the way for the most unbridled licentiousness, and to take away the responsibility of maternity is to destroy one of the strongest bulwarks of female virtue." In 1881 the same journal reported that Catholic anti-abortion efforts had been much more successful than Protestant ones.

== Role in the abortion debate ==
Following the 1968 publication of Humanae Vitae, an encyclical by Pope Paul VI that expressly forbade abortion and most methods of birth control and that sowed controversy within the church over its restatement of the prohibition on birth control, Catholic bishops in the United States started to stress anti-abortion views as a central facet of Catholic identity and preached against proposed liberalization of state-level abortion laws.

Before the 1973 Roe v. Wade decision, which resulted in the legalization of abortion in the United States, the United States right-to-life movement consisted of lawyers, politicians, and doctors, almost all of whom were Catholic. The only coordinated opposition to abortion during the early 1970s came from the United States Conference of Catholic Bishops and the Family Life Bureau, also a Catholic organization. According to Charles Curran, prior to Roe v. Wade, abortion was not a high priority for Catholic bishops in the United States.

According to Curran, the level of involvement of the Catholic hierarchy changed dramatically after Roe v. Wade. A short time after the decision, the Catholic-sponsored National Right to Life Committee (NRLC) was created to mobilize a wide-scale anti-abortion movement. The NRLC also organized non-Catholics, and eventually become the largest anti-abortion organization in the United States. Curran asserts that, since Roe v. Wade, the Catholic hierarchy in the United States has devoted more time, energy and money to the issue of abortion than any other single issue.

The American media has followed and reported on the substantial role of the Catholic Church in the abortion debate. Connie Paige has been quoted as having said that: "[t]he Roman Catholic Church created the right-to-life movement. Without the church, the movement would not exist as such today."

At the same time, the US Conference of Catholic Bishops, in Forming consciences for Faithful Citizenship, quoted the words of Pope John Paul II: "The fact that only the negative commandments oblige always and under all circumstances does not mean that in the moral life prohibitions are more important than the obligation to do good indicated by the positive commandment."

== Dissenting Catholics ==
An independent organization called Catholics for Choice was founded in 1973 to support the availability of abortion, stating that this position is compatible with Catholic teachings, particularly the primacy of conscience and the importance of the laity in shaping church law. This organization was founded "to serve as a voice for Catholics" who believe that contraception and abortion are moral. Catholics for Choice believe:

Church teachings, tradition and core Catholic tenets—including the primacy of conscience, the role of the faithful in defining legitimate laws and norms, and support for the separation of church and state—leave room for supporting a more liberal position on abortion. ... Catholics can, in good conscience, support access to abortion and affirm that abortion can be a moral choice. Indeed, many of us do.

In October 1984, Catholics for Choice (then Catholics for a Free Choice) placed an advertisement, called "A Catholic Statement on Pluralism and Abortion" and signed by over one hundred prominent Catholics, including nuns, in the New York Times. The advertisement stated that "direct abortion...can sometimes be a moral choice" and that "responsible moral decisions can only be made in an atmosphere of freedom from fear of coercion." The Vatican initiated disciplinary measures against some of the nuns who signed the statement, sparking controversy among American Catholics, and intra-Catholic conflict on the abortion issue remained news for at least two years in the United States.

The United States Conference of Catholic Bishops has stated that "[CFC] is not a Catholic organization, does not speak for the Catholic Church, and in fact promotes positions contrary to the teaching of the Church as articulated by the Holy See and the USCCB." Bishop Fabian Bruskewitz excommunicated all members of this organization in his jurisdiction in 1996.

=== Margaret McBride ===
In November 2009, when Sister Margaret McBride, as a member of the ethics board of a Catholic hospital, allowed doctors to perform an abortion to save the life of a mother of four suffering from pulmonary hypertension, Bishop Thomas J. Olmsted excommunicated her on the grounds that, while efforts should be made to save a pregnant woman's life, abortion cannot be used as a means to that end.

== Politics ==
=== Pro-abortion rights Catholic politicians ===
Since the Catholic Church views abortion as gravely wrong, it considers it a duty to reduce its acceptance by the public and in civil legislation. While it considers that Catholics should not favour direct abortion in any field, it recognizes that Catholics may accept compromises that, while permitting direct abortions, lessen their incidence by, for instance, restricting some forms or enacting remedies against the conditions that give rise to them.

In 1990, John Cardinal O'Connor of New York suggested that, by supporting abortion rights, Catholic politicians who were pro-abortion rights risked excommunication. The response of Catholic pro-abortion rights politicians to O'Connor's comment was generally defiant. Congresswoman Nancy Pelosi asserted that, "There is no desire to fight with the cardinals or archbishops. But it has to be clear that we are elected officials and we uphold the law and we support public positions separate and apart from our Catholic faith."

There has been controversy in the United States over whether Catholic politicians who promote legalization of abortion should be denied communion. Most instances of such controversy have involved a bishop threatening to deny a politician communion, although other cases have involved a bishop telling a politician not to seek communion or considering excommunicating the politician. Those bishops who support denying communion, including Raymond Leo Burke, base their position on Canon 915.

Because few American bishops are in favor of withholding communion from politicians and the majority are opposed, the United States Conference of Catholic Bishops decided in 2004 that such matters should left to the discretion of each bishop on a case-by-case basis.

These statements of intent from church authorities have sometimes led American Catholic voters to vote for candidates who wish to ban abortion, rather than pro-abortion rights candidates who support other Catholic Church positions, such as war, health care, immigration, or lowering the abortion rate. Penalties of this kind from bishops have targeted Democrats, although a number of prominent Republican politicians are also pro-abortion rights.

Politicians who have been targeted in such controversies include Lucy Killea, Mario Cuomo, John Kerry, Rudy Giuliani, and Joe Biden. Killea's case was the first recorded; Kerry's led to comparisons between his presidential campaign and that of John F. Kennedy in 1960. While Kennedy had to demonstrate his independence from the Roman Catholic Church due to public fear that a Catholic president would make decisions based on Vatican commands, it seemed that Kerry, in contrast, had to show obedience to Catholic authorities in order to win votes.

Proposals to deny communion to pro-abortion rights politicians are unique to the United States. Suggested reasons for this uniqueness are a politicization of pastoral practice and abortion's constitutional status as a right until 2022.

== Attitudes of Catholic laity ==
Many or most U.S. Catholics disagree with official Church teaching on abortion in some or all particulars. The distribution of views among U.S. Catholics regarding abortion is substantially the same as the distribution of views among non-Catholics.

=== Moral acceptability ===
Analysis of the 2006-2008 Gallup Values and Beliefs surveys indicates that 40% of Catholics consider abortion "morally acceptable", a result that is roughly equivalent to the 41% of non-Catholics holding the same view. According to 1995 survey by Lake Research and Tarrance Group, 64% of U.S. Catholics say they disapprove of the statement that "abortion is morally wrong in every case". According to 2016 survey by Pew Research Center, 51% of U.S. Catholics say that "having an abortion is morally wrong". According to Marist College Institute for Public Opinion's survey released in 2008, 36% of practising Catholics, defined as those who attend church at least twice a month, consider themselves "pro-choice"; while 65% of non-practicing Catholics considers themselves "pro-choice", 76% of them says that "abortion should be significantly restricted". According to the National Catholic Reporter, some 58% of American Catholic women feel that they do not have to follow the abortion teaching of their bishop.

=== Legality ===
Between 16% and 22% of American Catholic voters share the view that abortion should never be permitted by law. According to 2009 survey by Pew Research Center, 47% of American Catholics believe that abortion should be legal in "all or most cases", while 42% of American Catholics believe that abortion should be illegal in "all or most cases". When posed a binary question of whether abortion was acceptable or unacceptable, rather than a question of whether it should be allowed or not allowed in all or most cases, according to polls conducted in 2006-2008 by Gallup, 40% of American Catholics said it was acceptable, approximately the same percentage as non-Catholics; 58% of American Catholics said it was morally wrong.

In 2024, 63% of Hispanic Catholics support legal abortion in all or most cases, and constitute 33% of U.S. Catholics.

Some reasons for dissenting from the church's position on the legality of abortion, other than finding abortion morally acceptable, include "I am personally opposed to abortion, but I think the Church is concentrating its energies too much on abortion rather than on social action" or "I do not wish to impose my views on others."

=== Prevalence of abortion ===
A 1994-1995 survey conducted by Guttmacher Institute of abortion patients found that "Catholic women have an abortion rate 29% higher than Protestant women."

=== Attitudes of committed Catholics ===
Attitudes of U.S. Catholics regarding abortion were found to differ significantly when the polls distinguished between practicing and/or churchgoing Catholics and non-practicing Catholics. Those who attend church weekly are more likely to oppose abortion. According to Marist College Institute for Public Opinion's survey released in 2008, 36% of practising Catholics, defined as those who attend church at least twice a month, consider themselves "pro-choice"; while 65% of non-practicing Catholics considers themselves "pro-choice", 76% of them says that "abortion should be significantly restricted". According to polls conducted in 2006-2008 by Gallup, 24% of practicing Catholics, defined in this poll as those who attend church "weekly or almost every week", believe abortion is morally acceptable.

=== Compatibility of dissent with Catholic belief ===
Recent polls state that some Catholics may personally oppose abortion but still support its legality. While 58% of American Catholics are likely to agree that abortion is morally wrong, and 46% of white Catholics and 65% of Latino Catholics are likely to agree that abortion is a sin, according to 2011 report by Public Religion Research Institute, 68% of American Catholics are likely to agree that one "can still be a good Catholic even if you disagree with official church teaching on abortion," approximately as many as members of other religious groups. (Note: Based on a 2011 telephone survey by Public Religion Research Institute with a general sample size of 3000 out of which 612 Catholics including 454 white Catholics and 119 Latino Catholics.)

On this long-standing phenomenon of a number of Catholics disagreeing with the Church's official position on abortion, Pope John Paul II reiterated in 1987 that it "is a grave error" to "claim[] that dissent from the Magisterium is totally compatible with being a good Catholic and poses no obstacle to the reception of the sacraments." In what the Los Angeles Times called a key admonition, he added: "It has never been easy to accept the Gospel teaching in its entirety, and it never will be."

=== Voting ===
Abortion is not the main issue most American Catholics consider when choosing how to vote. A survey in 2008 showed that less than one third (29%) of Catholic voters in the U.S. stated that they choose their candidate based solely on the candidate's position on abortion; most of these vote for anti-abortion candidates. 44% believe a "good Catholic" cannot vote for a pro-abortion rights politician, while 53% believe one can.

== Dissenting individuals and groups ==
Philosopher Daniel Dombrowski wrote, with Richard Deltete, A Brief, Liberal, Catholic Defense of Abortion, which analyzed Church theological history to argue that Catholic values supported a pro-abortion rights position.

== See also ==
- Catholic Church and abortion
- Catholic Church and politics in the United States
- Culture war
- Humanae Vitae
- Opposition to the legalization of abortion
- Pro-choice and pro-life
