= The Obria Group =

The Obria Group is a 501(c)(3) non-profit that runs crisis pregnancy centers in the United States. They have 20 clinics in 6 states.

Their Web site states, "Obria Medical Clinics does not provide abortion services nor refer for them."

In 2018, they applied for but were turned down for a title X grant because they did not provide hormonal birth control. In 2019, they received millions of dollars of grants of title X funding from the Trump administration after promising to provide birth control. The grant garnered criticism because title X grants are intended to fund family planning services, which the centers did not at the time of award provide, aside from advising less effective methods such as abstinence and the rhythm method. Google has been criticised for giving them grants for ads which have been called "deceptive."

The Obria Group were previously known under the name Birth Choice Health Clinics.
