= Harold O. J. Brown =

American theologian (1933-2007)

Harold Ogden Joseph Brown
- Born: July 6, 1933; Tampa, Florida, U.S.
- Died: July 8, 2007 (aged 74); Charlotte, North Carolina, U.S.
- Education: A.B. (Harvard College, 1953); B.D. (Harvard Divinity School, 1957); S.T.M. (Harvard Divinity School, 1959); Ph.D. (Harvard University, 1967)
- Occupations: Theologian; professor; activist; author
- Organizations: Trinity Evangelical Divinity School; Reformed Theological Seminary (Charlotte)
- Known for: Co‑founding the Christian Action Council (now Care Net); leadership in the modern pro‑life movement
- Notable work: The Protest of a Troubled Protestant (1969); Death Before Birth (1977); Heresies: The Image of Christ… (1984); The Sensate Culture (1996)
- Spouse: Grace Hancox Brown
- Children: Two

Harold O. J. Brown (July 6, 1933 - July 8, 2007) was a theologian, professor, activist, and author in the United States. He was a professor of theology for many years at Trinity Evangelical Divinity School and later at Reformed Theological Seminary (RTS) in Charlotte, North Carolina. He was also the co-founder of the Christian Action Council.

== Early life and education ==
Brown was born in Tampa, Florida. He completed his A.B. at Harvard College in 1953, his B.D. at Harvard Divinity School in 1957, and his Master of Sacred Theology at Harvard Divinity School in 1959, with a thesis on the topic of Joachim of Floris and the Third Age in History. He completed his Doctor of Philosophy at Harvard University in 1967 with a dissertation entitled John Laski: A Theological Biography. A Polish Contribution to the Protestant Reformation.

== Career ==
Brown was best known for his foundational role in shaping the modern pro-life movement. An evangelical Christian, he was part of a pan-Christian movement that developed in the wake of the 1960s counter culture. In 1975, he co-founded the Christian Action Council (now Care Net) with former U.S. Surgeon General C. Everett Koop, envisioning both legal resistance to abortion and a compassionate alternative through a network of pregnancy care centers. Brown's theological insight and philosophical clarity helped articulate the pro-life case not merely as a political position but as a profound moral and theological issue concerning the nature of human life and dignity. Beyond abortion, he was among the few evangelicals to seriously engage with the ethical challenges posed by biotechnology and bioethics, helping shape evangelical responses to emerging questions in human dignity and scientific advancement.

In addition to activism, Brown was deeply committed to teaching and scholarship. He served as a professor at both Trinity Evangelical Divinity School and Reformed Theological Seminary. He was also an ordained Congregationalist pastor, serving congregations in Beverly, Massachusetts, Boston, and Klosters, Switzerland. In addition, he was a prolific writer and an ecumenical bridge-builder through efforts like Evangelicals and Catholics Together. Brown’s books addressed a wide range of theological, cultural, and philosophical issues, while his editorial work at publications such as Christianity Today, Human Life Review, and the Religion and Society Report expanded his influence across American evangelicalism.

== Personal life and death ==
Brown was married for many years to Grace Brown, and together they had two children. He died from cancer on July 8, 2007 in Charlotte, North Carolina.

== Legacy ==
A lecture series at RTS is named for him.

== Books ==
- The Protest of a Troubled Protestant (1969)
- Christianity and the Class Struggle (1970)
- Death Before Birth (1977)
- The Reconstruction of the Republic (1977)
- Heresies: The Image of Christ in the Mirror of Heresy and Orthodoxy from the Apostles to the Present (1984)
- The Sensate Culture (1996)

== Articles ==
- ”The Passivity of American Christians”
