= Jane's Revenge =

American militant abortion rights group

- Founded: May 8, 2022
- Dates active: May 8, 2022 – c. 2023
- Country: United States
- Website: janesrevenge.noblogs.org

Jane's Revenge was a militant, extremist abortion-rights group that encouraged and claimed responsibility for acts of firebombing, vandalism, and arson in the United States. The group's actions targeted crisis pregnancy centers, a Christian church, and a congressional office. The claimed attacks began in May 2022 following the leak of a draft of the Supreme Court's anticipated decision in Dobbs v. Jackson Women's Health Organization; the draft indicated that the Court would soon overturn its 1973 abortion rights decision in Roe v. Wade, and the Court, in fact, did reverse Roe the following month when its final decision in Dobbs was released.

The group was mostly active during the spring and early summer of 2022. Updates on the group's blog of further attacks ceased after July 8, 2022.

== History ==
On May 6, 2022, a draft of the Supreme Court of the United States decision Dobbs v. Jackson Women's Health Organization was leaked to the public. The draft indicated that the Court intended to overturn two previous decisions, Roe v. Wade (1973) and Planned Parenthood v. Casey (1992), which had conferred constitutional protections upon abortion rights. Jane's Revenge formed in response to the leak, posting its "First Communiqué" on May 8, 2022. (The name "Jane's Revenge" may refer to the pseudonymous "Jane Roe" of Roe v. Wade or to the Jane Collective, an underground organization founded by Heather Booth in 1969 that helped women obtain abortions prior to Roe v. Wade.) Posted after the firebombing of a crisis pregnancy center in Madison, Wisconsin, the "First Communiqué" read, in part, as follows:

This was only a warning. We demand the disbanding of all anti-choice establishments, fake clinics, and violent anti-choice groups within the next thirty days. This is not a mere "difference of opinion" as some have framed it. We are literally fighting for our lives ... As you continue to bomb clinics and assassinate doctors with impunity, so too shall we adopt increasingly extreme tactics to maintain freedom over our own bodies. We are forced to adopt the minimum military requirement for a political struggle.

The main public mouthpiece of Jane's Revenge is an anonymous blog that lists actions taken that have been signed "Jane's Revenge", and sometimes claims credit for said actions. The firebombing in Madison, Wisconsin, was the first incident for which Jane's Revenge claimed credit.

On June 15, 2022, Jane's Revenge posted the following on its blog:

We were unsurprised to see thirty days come and thirty days pass with no sign of consilience or even bare-minimum self-reflection from you who impersonate healthcare providers in order to harm the vulnerable ... You could have walked away. Now the leash is off ... From here forward, any anti-choice group who closes their doors, and stops operating will no longer be a target. But until you do, it's open season, and we know where your operations are.

Later, Jane's Revenge called for a "night of rage" to occur if the Court overturned Roe.

After the June 24 Dobbs decision overturning Roe v. Wade was released, Jane's Revenge vandalized a crisis pregnancy center in Virginia, and committed arson at a second center in Colorado. The FBI was called in to investigate the instance of arson in Colorado. Jane's Revenge has claimed responsibility for a series of other arson attacks and acts of vandalism, some of which occurred before Dobbs was released and some of which occurred afterwards. Mary Ziegler, a law professor at University of California, Davis, has attributed the actions of the group to a growing distrust in government and democratic institutions.

On June 28, The Intercept reported that Facebook had internally labeled Jane's Revenge a terrorist organization, making the topic subject to the most stringent content filtering.

== Major actions ==
Date	Target	City	Metro Area	State	Attack type	Claimed?	Ref
May 8, 2022	Wisconsin Family Action	Madison	Madison	Wisconsin	Firebombing, arson, property-destruction, vandalism	Claimed	
May 14, 2022	Alpha Pregnancy Center	Reisterstown	Baltimore	Maryland	Property-destruction, vandalism	Claimed	
May 22, 2022	St. Michael's Catholic Church	Olympia	Seattle	Washington	Vandalism	Claimed	
May 25, 2022	Next Step Pregnancy Services	Lynnwood	Seattle	Washington	Vandalism	Claimed	
May 30, 2022	Dove Medical Center	Eugene	Eugene	Oregon	Property-destruction, vandalism	Claimed	
May 30, 2022	South Broward Pregnancy Center	Hollywood	Miami	Florida	Property-destruction, vandalism	Claimed	
June 2, 2022	Agape Pregnancy Resource Center	Des Moines	Des Moines	Iowa	Property-destruction, vandalism	Claimed	
June 7, 2022	CompassCare's Buffalo (Pregnancy Resource Center)	Amherst	Buffalo-Niagara Falls	New York	Firebombing, property-destruction, vandalism (2 firefighters injured)	Claimed	
June 7, 2022	Mountain Area Pregnancy Services	Asheville	Asheville	North Carolina	Property-destruction, vandalism	Attributed	
June 8, 2022	Options360 Women's Clinic	Vancouver	Portland	Washington	Vandalism	Claimed	
June 10, 2022	First Image (Crisis Pregnancy Center)	Gresham	Portland	Oregon	Firebombing, property-destruction, vandalism	Attributed	
June 19, 2022	The Lennon Pregnancy Center	Dearborn Heights	Detroit	Michigan	Property-destruction, vandalism	Claimed	
June 19, 2022	Pregnancy Care Center	Redford	Detroit	Michigan	Property-destruction, vandalism	Claimed	
June 21, 2022	Office of Rep. Tim Walberg and Jackson Right to Life	Jackson	Metro Detroit	Michigan	Property-destruction, vandalism	Attributed	
June 25, 2022	Life Choices Ministry	Longmont	Longmont	Colorado	Arson	Attributed	
June 25, 2022	Blue Ridge Pregnancy Center	Lynchburg	Lynchburg	Virginia	Property-destruction, vandalism	Attributed	
June 26, 2022	Tree of Life Pregnancy Support Center	Paso Robles	San Luis Obispo-Paso Robles	California	Property-destruction, vandalism	Attributed	
June 26, 2022	LifeChoice Pregnancy Center	Winter Haven	Lakeland-Winter Haven	Florida	Vandalism	Attributed	
June 27, 2022	Two Hearts Pregnancy Aid	Everett	Seattle	Washington	Arson, vandalism	Attributed	
July 5, 2022	Birthright (Crisis Pregnancy Center)	St. Paul	Twin Cities	Minnesota	Property-destruction, vandalism	Attributed	
July 8, 2022	Problem Pregnancy	Worcester	Worcester	Massachusetts	Vandalism	Claimed	
July 8, 2022	Clearway Clinic	Worcester	Worcester	Massachusetts	Property-destruction, vandalism	Claimed	
August 19, 2022	Bethlehem House	Easthampton	Springfield	Massachusetts	Vandalism	Claimed	
April 15, 2023	HerChoice	Bowling Green	Toledo	Ohio	Vandalism	Attributed	

== Government response ==
In May 2022, the Bureau of Alcohol, Tobacco, Firearms and Explosives (ATF) stated that Jane's Revenge was the target of an ongoing investigation. The Madison, Wisconsin, police department also announced an investigation of their own in collaboration with the ATF.

In June 2022, after the Dobbs v. Jackson decision was released, the Department of Homeland Security (DHS) released a memo concerning the group. The memo described Jane's Revenge as "a network of loosely affiliated suspected violent extremists [which] has been linked to arson attacks against the buildings of ideological opponents", warning of risk of violence that "could occur for weeks following the release" of the Supreme Court decision.

In March 2023, a superseding indictment from the U.S. Department of Justice named four members of Jane's Revenge, whom they announced were facing prosecution under the Freedom of Access to Clinic Entrances Act for conspiring to both vandalize and threaten multiple crisis pregnancy centers in Florida. On June 14, 2024, three of the defendants, Caleb Freestone, Amber Stewart-Smith and Annarella Rivera, pled guilty to the charges while the fourth, Gabriella Oropesa, was convicted by a jury on December 19, 2024. On February 12, Freestone was sentenced to a year in prison, while Stewart-Smith and Rivera were each sentenced to 1 month in prison and 60 days in home detention. Oropesa was fined a $13,000 civil penalty and on March 13, 2025, she was sentenced to 120 days imprisonment.
