= National Institute of Family and Life Advocates v. Becerra =

- Supreme Court of the United States

Argued March 20, 2018 Decided June 26, 2018
- Full case name: National Institute of Family and Life Advocates, dba NIFLA, et al., Petitioners v. Xavier Becerra, Attorney General of California, et al.
- Docket no.: 16-1140
- Citations: 585 U.S. 755 (more) 138 S. Ct. 2361; 201 L. Ed. 2d 835
- Argument: Oral argument
- Decision: Opinion

Case history
- Prior: Motion for preliminary injunction denied, No. 3:15-cv-02277-JAH-DHB, 2016 U.S. Dist. LEXIS 92612 (S.D. Cal. 2016); aff'd, 839 F.3d 823 (9th Cir. 2016); cert. granted, 138 S. Ct. 464 (2017).

Holding
- The California Reproductive FACT Act, which required crisis pregnancy centers to alert clients about state-assisted abortions, violated the First Amendment to the United States Constitution.

Court membership
- Chief Justice John Roberts Associate Justices Anthony Kennedy · Clarence Thomas; Ruth Bader Ginsburg · Stephen Breyer; Samuel Alito · Sonia Sotomayor; Elena Kagan · Neil Gorsuch

Case opinions
- Majority: Thomas, joined by Roberts, Kennedy, Alito, Gorsuch
- Concurrence: Kennedy, joined by Roberts, Alito, Gorsuch
- Dissent: Breyer, joined by Ginsburg, Sotomayor, Kagan

Laws applied
- U.S. Const. amend. I

National Institute of Family and Life Advocates v. Becerra, 585 U.S. 755 (2018), was a case before the Supreme Court of the United States addressing the constitutionality of California's FACT Act, which mandated that crisis pregnancy centers provide certain disclosures about state services. The law required that licensed centers post visible notices that other options for pregnancy, including abortion, are available from state-sponsored clinics. It also mandated that unlicensed centers post notice of their unlicensed status. The centers, typically run by Christian non-profit groups, challenged the act on the basis that it violated their free speech. After prior reviews in lower courts, the case was brought to the Supreme Court, asking "Whether the disclosures required by the California Reproductive FACT Act violate the protections set forth in the free speech clause of the First Amendment, applicable to the states through the Fourteenth Amendment."

The Court ruled on June 26, 2018, in a 5–4 decision that the notices required by the FACT Act likely violate the First Amendment by targeting speakers rather than speech.

== Background ==
A crisis pregnancy center (CPC) is a type of nonprofit organization established to counsel pregnant women against having an abortion. CPCs provide peer counseling related to abortion, pregnancy, and childbirth, and they may offer non-medical services such as financial assistance, child-rearing resources, and adoption referrals. CPCs that qualify as medical clinics may provide pregnancy testing, sonograms, and other services. CPCs are typically run by anti-abortion Christians according to a conservative Christian philosophy, and thus do not recommend abortion as an option for pregnancy.

Medical professionals and abortion-rights advocates allege that CPCs omit information, provide false or misleading information regarding abortion, and may lead women to unsafe medical options. Cities like Baltimore, Austin, and New York passed legislation to require CPCs to disclose their status and that they did not offer abortion services, but organizations representing the CPCs have been successful in courts challenging these laws, principally on the argument that forcing the CPCs to post such language violated their First Amendment rights and constituted compelled speech.

Based on a report prepared by NARAL Pro-Choice America, which alleged that CPCs were providing misleading and inaccurate information, the California State Legislature passed the Reproductive FACT (Freedom, Accountability, Comprehensive Care, and Transparency) Act (AB-775) in October 2015. It required any licensed healthcare facility that provided care services related to pregnancies to post a notice that stated "California has public programs that provide immediate free or low-cost access to comprehensive family planning services (including all FDA-approved methods of contraception), prenatal care, and abortion for eligible women." The law set provisions where this notice was to be posted and established civil fines if facilities did not comply. The Act required unlicensed facilities which offered certain pregnancy-related services to post a notice stating: "This facility is not licensed as a medical facility by the State of California and has no licensed medical provider who provides or directly supervises the provision of all of the services, whose primary purpose is providing pregnancy-related services." Whereas the previous attempts at regulating CPCs in Baltimore and other cities were based on having signage that informed the patient that the CPC did not offer abortion-related services, the FACT Act instead was intended to make the patient aware of state-sponsored services that were available rather than what the CPCs did or did not offer. The law went into effect January 1, 2016.

=== Procedural history ===
CPCs and the Pacific Justice Institute filed lawsuits challenging the constitutionality of the Reproductive FACT Act. The CPCs asserted that the law's requirements constituted compelled speech in violation of their rights to freedom of speech and free exercise of religion under the First Amendment. Among these was a lawsuit filed in the U.S. District Court for the Southern District of California by the National Institute of Family and Life Advocates (NIFLA), which represented over 100 CPCs in California. NIFLA sought a preliminary injunction to prevent the Reproductive FACT Act from coming into force on January 1, 2016, while the lawsuit continued. The Court denied the motion for a preliminary injunction in February 2016. NIFLA appealed from the denial of the preliminary injunction to the U.S. Court of Appeals for the Ninth Circuit in June 2016, which affirmed the judgment of the District Court in a unanimous decision authored by Judge Dorothy W. Nelson, joined by Judges A. Wallace Tashima and John B. Owens.

The Ninth Circuit decision noted the existence of a circuit split on the issue of the proper level of scrutiny to apply in cases relating to abortion-related disclosures, and agreed with the Fourth Circuit that the Supreme Court's decision in Planned Parenthood v. Casey did not resolve this question. The Court held that the notice that the state required to be posted in licensed facilities constituted professional speech, subject to intermediate scrutiny, and that the notice survived intermediate scrutiny because California has "a substantial interest in the health of its citizens, including ensuring that its citizens have access to and adequate information about constitutionally-protected medical services like abortion" and because the notice was "narrowly drawn to achieve California's substantial interests." The Court further held that the required notice for unlicensed facilities would survive any standard of review—even strict scrutiny—holding that "California has a compelling interest in informing pregnant women when they are using the medical services of a facility that has not satisfied licensing standards set by the state. And given the Legislature’s findings regarding the existence of CPCs, which often present misleading information to women about reproductive medical services, California’s interest in presenting accurate information about the licensing status of individual clinics is particularly compelling." The Court also ruled that the petitioners had no likelihood of success on their claim that the law violated their rights under the Free Exercise Clause. Citing Employment Division v. Smith, the court held that the law was a "neutral law of general applicability, subject to only rational basis review."

The Ninth Circuit denied a motion for rehearing en banc in December 2016.

== Supreme Court ==
NIFLA filed a petition for writ of certiorari in March 2017, asking the Supreme Court to hear the case, pointing to the circuit split identified in the Ninth Circuit's decision. NIFLA specifically asked the Court to decide the question of "Whether the Free Speech Clause or the Free Exercise Clause of the First Amendment prohibits California from compelling licensed anti-abortion centers to post information on how to obtain a state-funded abortion and from compelling unlicensed anti-abortion centers to disseminate a disclaimer to clients on site and in any print and digital advertising." The Court agreed to hear the case in November 2017.

NIFLA was represented by Alliance Defending Freedom.

Oral arguments were held on March 20, 2018. Observers of the arguments believed the Court favored the CPCs and agreed with their arguments that the legal requirements of the Reproductive FACT Act not only burdened the free speech of the centers, but also put a burden on the centers to post the notice – for example, CPCs in Los Angeles County would be required to post the notice in 13 different languages. At oral argument, a number of justices said they believed that the FACT Act was written specifically to target CPCs; Justice Elena Kagan questioned whether that the law was "gerrymandered" to impact CPCs rather than all pregnancy service providers. The Court also considered the FACT Act in relationship to the Court's previous ruling of Planned Parenthood v. Casey, which upheld the constitutionality of a Pennsylvanian law that required doctors performing abortions to provide their clients with health information related to them.

=== Opinion of the Court ===
The Court announced judgment on June 26, 2018 in favor of the challengers. In the 5–4 decision, split between the conservative and liberal justices, the Court ruled that both notices required by the FACT Act likely violated the free speech principles of the First Amendment, reversing the Ninth Circuit's decision and remanding the case there for review. Justice Clarence Thomas wrote the majority opinion, joined by Justices Roberts, Kennedy, Alito, and Gorsuch. Thomas noted that the FACT Act targeted the speaker of the language demanded by the Act rather than the speech itself, which conflicted with the First Amendment. He wrote that the FACT Act "imposes a government-scripted, speaker-based disclosure requirement that is wholly disconnected from the State’s informational interest", and because it only applied to a specific classification of facilities, it could be seen as compelled speech for those in the CPCs that disagreed with the state's stance on abortion. Thomas' opinion rejected the Ninth Circuit's conclusion that the FACT Act was equivalent to "professional speech", defined through Zauderer v. Office of Disciplinary Counsel of Supreme Court of Ohio, 471 U.S. 626 (1985) as "factual, noncontroversial information" that is less protected by the First Amendment, as the FACT Act notice dealt with the controversial topic of abortion. Instead, Thomas argued, the state could use public advertising or even post public notices near the CPCs to achieve the same message without violating the First Amendment. In regard to the notice for unlicensed centers, Thomas found that the state had not proved anything more than a "purely hypothetical" harm that the notices were to remedy, following Ibanez v. Florida Dept. of Business and Professional Regulation, Bd. of Accountancy, 512 U.S. 136 (1994), and even if they had demonstrated such harm, the notices would still run afoul of the First Amendment challenges.

=== Concurrence and dissent ===
Justice Kennedy wrote a concurrence, which was also joined by Roberts, Alito, and Gorsuch, which further asserted that the FACT Act was specifically targeting anti-abortion centers, describing it as "This law is a paradigmatic example of the serious threat presented when government seeks to impose its own message in the place of individual speech, thought, and expression".

Justice Breyer wrote the dissenting opinion, joined by Ginsburg, Sotomayor, and Kagan. Breyer took issue with the majority's take on the First Amendment, using a heightened standard to test the First Amendment applicability as established from Sorrell v. IMS Health Inc., 564 U.S. 552 (2011). Breyer also criticized the majority's opinion in light of the Court's decision from Planned Parenthood v. Casey, 505 U.S. 833 (1992), in which the Court affirmed the constitutionality of a law requiring physicians to provide women considering abortions with information related to adoption. Breyer wrote "a Constitution that allows States to insist that medical providers tell women about the possibility of adoption should also allow States similarly to insist that medical providers tell women about the possibility of abortion".

== See also ==
- List of United States Supreme Court cases, volume 585
