= Choose Life license plates =

Specialty license plates

Choose Life license plates are specialty license plates available in 33 states in the United States that express a "choose life" message. The plates are the concept of Choose Life, Inc., an anti-abortion advocacy group based in Ocala, Florida. It was founded in 1997 by Randy Harris, a Marion County commissioner, after being inspired by an environmental license plate on the car in front of him to use specialty license plates as a way to raise funds for crisis pregnancy centers, which are organization established by anti-abortion groups primarily to persuade pregnant women not to have an abortion. The plates feature the phrase "Choose Life", a slogan used by the anti-abortion movement, and a Microsoft Paint style drawing of two children.

Sample Florida Choose Life tag

== History ==
In 1997, Choose Life, Inc. collected the 10,000 signatures and US$30,000 required under Florida law at the time to submit an application for a new specialty plate, and State Senator Tom Lee sponsored a bill in support of the tag's creation. The bill passed both houses of the Florida Legislature in early 1998, but was vetoed by then-Governor Lawton Chiles, who stated that license plates are not the "proper forum for debate" on political issues. While campaigning for the governorship later in 1998, Jeb Bush stated that, if elected, he would sign a Choose Life bill if approved by the legislature. Choose Life, Inc. went forward with the plate application again, and, after passing both houses, Governor Bush signed it into law on June 8, 1999. Since then, Choose Life, Inc. has been active in helping groups in other states pursue "Choose Life" license plates. As of April 30, 2010, Choose Life, Inc. reported that Choose Life license plates had raised over $12 million. On June 21, 2011, Florida Governor Rick Scott signed House Bill 501, which directs the funds from the plates directly to Choose Life, Inc.

Choose Life, Inc. is a non-profit organization, funded by donations and the sale of promotional items, such as T-shirts and neckties. A specialty license plate can cost an additional $25 – US$70 per year. Allocation of funds varies by state but funds typically go to crisis pregnancy centers, which are nonprofit organizations established to counsel women against receiving abortions.

== States with Choose Life license plates ==
As of 2023, Choose Life license plates are available in 34 states and the District of Columbia:

- Alabama
- Alaska
- Arizona
- Arkansas
- Connecticut
- Delaware
- District of Columbia
- Florida
- Georgia
- Hawaii
- Idaho
- Indiana
- Iowa
- Kansas
- Kentucky
- Louisiana
- Maryland
- Massachusetts
- Mississippi
- Missouri
- Montana
- Nebraska (2017)
- New Jersey
- North Carolina (2016)
- North Dakota
- Ohio
- Oklahoma
- Pennsylvania
- South Carolina
- South Dakota
- Tennessee
- Texas
- Utah
- Virginia
- Wisconsin (2016)

=== States where Choose Life has been rejected ===
- Michigan: In 2017, Gov. Rick Snyder vetoed a bill proposing the plates, citing "the potential to bitterly divide millions of Michiganders".
- New York: For several years, litigation occurred between the Alliance Defense Fund (ADF) and the Department of Motor Vehicles. The original decision not to offer the specialty plates was overruled, but the issuance of the plates was held back pending an appeal in 2011. After more litigation, in 2015 the New York Department of Motor Vehicles' policy to exclude controversial, politically sensitive messages from plates was “reasonable and viewpoint neutral, which is all that the First Amendment requires" according to the 2nd Circuit majority opinion. After the decision in Walker v. Texas Division, Sons of Confederate Veterans, which gave states the right to determine whatever speech they want or do not want on plates issued by their state, no further appeal of the 2nd District decision was made by the ADF.
- Rhode Island: Gov. Lincoln Chafee vetoed a bill proposing the plates, citing the inappropriateness of using state license plates to fund religious initiatives.

== Reaction and criticism ==
"Choose Life" license plates have been criticized by abortion rights organizations, which have argued that in authorizing them, but not offering plates conveying a pro-abortion rights message at the same time, states have carried out viewpoint discrimination. To this charge, Russ Amerling, Choose Life, Inc.'s publicity coordinator, replied that "[abortion rights groups] have just as much right to have a plate as we do, as long as they go through the same process we did and not try to piggy-back onto the various states' Choose Life bills". He also said that no "[abortion rights groups] have ever applied for a plate of their own in any state, until an [anti-abortion group] applied for a 'Choose Life' plate."

Before June 2015, the United States Supreme Court had not yet clearly spoken on the legality of "Choose Life" specialty plates, and the federal circuits were split on their legality. The 4th Circuit had twice held that issuing an anti-abortion plate but not a pro-abortion rights plate is impermissible viewpoint discrimination, but the 6th Circuit held the opposite. The 2nd and 7th Circuits had ruled that states could refrain from allowing any discussion of abortion on plates. When Walker v. Texas Division, Sons of Confederate Veterans was rendered in June 2015, however, it allowed states to determine whether it wants controversial language on their plates or not, including pro- or anti-abortion rights language, which precluded further litigation in New York against having the plates as had been decided a month earlier in the 2nd District, or further litigation in North Carolina for the plates, where the interpretation of the 4th Circuit that it was viewpoint discrimination to have one and not the other was reversed in 2016 after a review was demanded by the Supreme Court in light of Walker.

As of 2011, five states currently offer license plates which promote abortion rights: Alaska, Hawaii, Montana, Pennsylvania, and Virginia.

== See also ==
- United States anti-abortion movement § Specialty license plates
