= Birthright International =

Canadian anti-abortion organization

Birthright International is an international organization of crisis pregnancy centers. It offers a range of services, to an estimated 10 million women, designed to "help support a woman's desire not to have an abortion," including referrals to legal, medical and psychological services, as well as a range of community support assistance such as financial aid.

The organization, founded in 1968 by Louise Summerhill has its international headquarters in Toronto, Ontario, Canada, having originated at Coxwell and Danforth.

Following the death of founder Louise Summerhill in August 1990, her three daughters, Mary Berney, Louise R. Summerhill and Stephenie Fox, took over operations. Berney continued as the executive director. After the retirement of Berney, Founder Louise Summerhill's granddaughter Victoria A. Summerhill Fox took over as executive director.

In July 2022, after the Dobbs v. Jackson Women's Health Organization decision was released in the United States, a Birthright CPC in St. Paul, Minnesota, was vandalized for the seventh time since 2017. MPR News reported that the abortion-rights group Jane's Revenge had claimed responsibility for similar attacks.
