= Crisis pregnancy center =

Organization that persuades pregnant women against having abortions

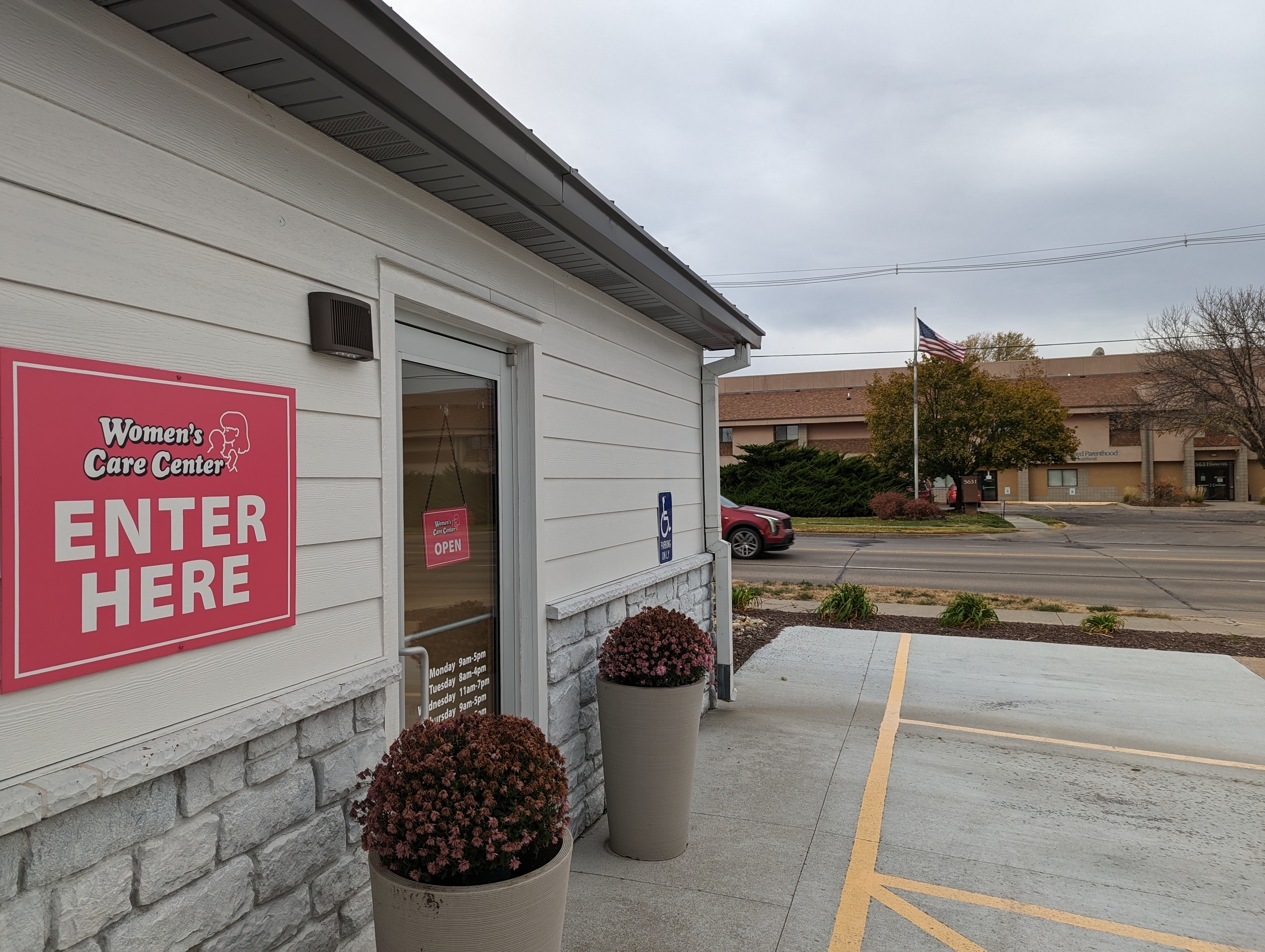
A CPC in Lincoln, Nebraska (foreground) intentionally located across the street from an abortion clinic (background)

A crisis pregnancy center (CPC), sometimes called a pregnancy resource center (PRC) or a pro-life pregnancy center, is a type of nonprofit organization established by anti-abortion groups primarily to persuade pregnant women not to have an abortion.

In the United States, there are an estimated 2,500 to 4,000 CPCs that qualify as clinics and may also provide pregnancy testing, medical ultrasounds, and other services. Many others operate without medical licensing under varying degrees of regulation. For comparison, there were 807 abortion clinics in the United States as of 2020. Hundreds more CPCs operate outside of the U.S., including in Canada, Latin America, Africa, and Europe.

CPCs have frequently been found to disseminate false medical information about the supposed physical and mental health risks of abortion. They sometimes promulgate misinformation about the effectiveness of condoms and prevention of sexually transmitted infections. CPCs are sometimes called fake abortion clinics by scholars, the media, and supporters of abortion rights due to deceptive advertising that obscures the centers' anti-abortion agenda.

Many CPCs are run by Christian groups that adhere to a socially conservative and anti-abortion viewpoint, and they often operate in affiliation with one of three non-profit organizations: Care Net, Heartbeat International, and Birthright International. In 1993, the National Institute of Family and Life Advocates (NIFLA) was formed to provide legal advice to CPCs in the U.S. During the presidency of George W. Bush (2001–2009), U.S. CPCs received tens of millions of dollars in federal grants. As of 2015, more than half of U.S. state governments helped to fund CPCs directly or through the sale of Choose Life license plates.

Legal and legislative action regarding CPCs has generally attempted to curb deceptive advertising, targeting those that imply that they offer abortion services by requiring centers to disclose that they do not offer certain services or possess certain qualifications.

== Origin ==
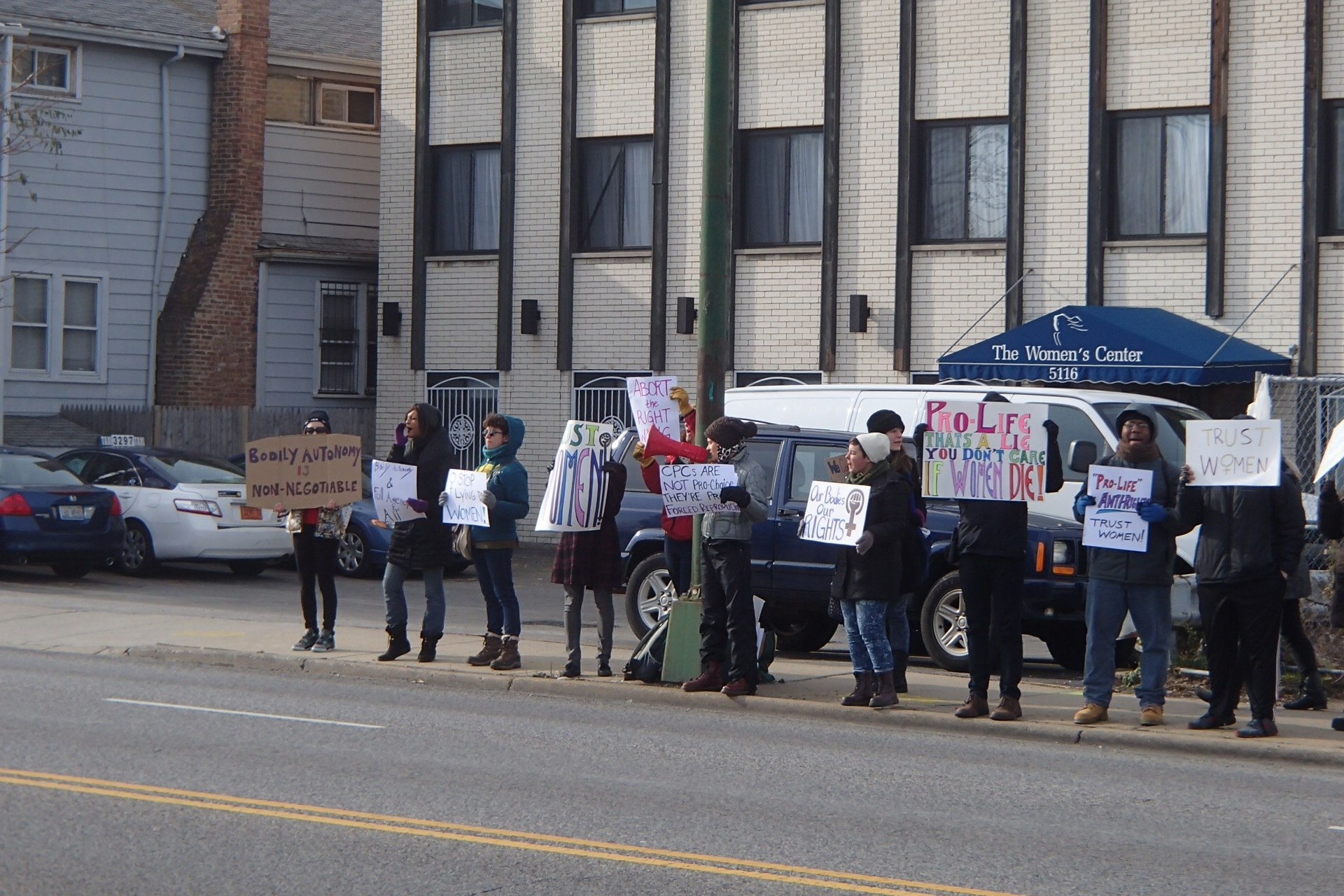
Protest against crisis pregnancy center in Chicago

Catholic carpenter Robert Pearson started the first CPC in Honolulu in 1967 after abortion was legalized in Hawaii. Pearson said that "a woman who wanted to terminate her pregnancy 'has no right to information that will help her kill her baby'." He formed the Pearson Foundation to help others start their own CPCs, offering detailed instructions for CPC management along with propaganda brochures and images to persuade pregnant women not to get an abortion. In 1968, the first Canadian network of centers was established by Birthright Internationa. Alternatives to Abortion, today known as Heartbeat International, was founded in 1971. Christian Action Council founded its first center in Baltimore, Maryland, in 1980. The Christian Action Council would eventually become Care Net. The CPC movement began as American Catholic activism, but after the 1973 passage of Roe v. Wade, interest in establishing CPCs widened to include American evangelical Christians.

== Activities ==
To fulfill their mission of persuading pregnant women to forgo abortions, CPCs advertise and offer pregnancy support services. Among the more common ones are free pregnancy tests, prenatal care, screening for sexually transmitted infections, and adoption referrals. Some offer counseling, including religious counseling and post-abortion counseling. Some provide material support, including clothing, maternity housing, food, financial assistance, and other essential supplies. Some offer training in topics such as budgeting, resumé building, and child rearing. An increasing number of CPCs obtain some form of medical certification to be able to expand their capabilities and marketing—for example, permission to perform sonograms in an attempt to convince women to carry their pregnancies to term. In some jurisdictions, such as Louisiana, CPCs are considered safe-haven zones in which parents may surrender custody of newborn infants. In 2020, a Texas chain of CPCs began providing contraceptives to unmarried women, stating that they wanted to help reduce cases of unintended pregnancy.

CPCs have been widely criticized by supporters of abortion rights for providing misleading and/or graphic information or content to patients to dissuade them from obtaining abortions. Their advertising campaigns have been criticized as being carefully designed to reach groups they perceive as being more inclined towards seeking abortion, such as young women, women of color, and those from lower socioeconomic backgrounds. Often, they place billboards near educational institutions and utilize public transportation and bus shelters for promotion. For example, Care Net's "Urban Initiative" aims explicitly to attract Black and Latina women by advertising on platforms like BET and drawing parallels between abortion and historical instances of oppression, such as slavery. The British Pregnancy Advisory Service, an independent abortion-providing agency, warned about the lack of regulation on CPCs by the National Health Service in that young women were dissuaded from abortion without full knowledge of their legal options or the consultation of their general practitioner. CPCs have focused on what they call "underserved" communities in an attempt to lower the high rates of abortion in communities of color.

=== Use of sonograms ===
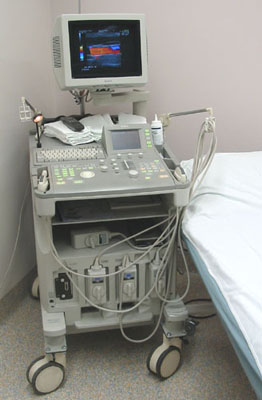
Ultrasound scanner

Some CPCs conduct free sonograms as a way to dissuade women from abortion. Proponents say that women who visit CPCs and see their embryos or fetuses through the use of ultrasound technology tend to decide against abortion, although scientific research suggests mandatory pre-abortion ultrasound has no effect on women's decisions to continue their pregnancy. Christian organizations like Focus on the Family and the Southern Baptist Convention, a theologically and socially conservative evangelical denomination and the largest Christian group in the US, have aimed to provide more CPCs with ultrasound equipment machines.

=== False medical information ===
CPCs have frequently been found to disseminate false medical information. In some cases, such information may be based on decades-old studies that have been discredited by more recent research. In others, CPCs may falsely claim to be describing an existing scientific consensus. CPCs' false information is usually about the supposed health risks of abortion, saying, for example, that abortion is much less safe for pregnant women than childbirth when the opposite is true. In fact, researchers have found that "the complication rate (of abortions) is less than that associated with wisdom tooth extraction, 7 percent, and tonsillectomies, 9 percent." The Society for Adolescent Health and Medicine and the North American Society for Pediatric and Adolescent Gynecology characterize the care at these centers as lacking "adherence to medical and ethical practice standards". A joint statement from the Society for Adolescent Health and Medicine and the North American Society for Pediatric and Adolescent Gynecology said that CPCs "pose risk by failing to adhere to medical and ethical practice standards". For example, CPC staffers commonly assert that the chances of getting breast cancer increase dramatically after abortion, even though major medical bodies, including the National Cancer Institute, note that there is no link between abortion and breast cancer.

Another common assertion is that abortion leads to mental health problems. CPC counselors have warned clients of severely negative psychological consequences, including high rates of depression, "post-abortion syndrome", post-traumatic stress disorder, suicide, substance abuse, sexual and relationship dysfunction, propensity to child abuse, and other emotional problems. These "counselors" are often priests or other religious members—not licensed counselors. "Post-abortion syndrome" has not been validated as a discrete psychiatric condition and is not recognized by the American Psychological Association, the American Psychiatric Association, the American Medical Association, the American College of Obstetricians and Gynecologists, or the American Public Health Association. The Royal College of Obstetricians and Gynaecologists finds no evidence to support an increased likelihood of abuse. In fact, CPCs are known to use disturbing visuals to manipulate pregnant women emotionally. CPCs may claim that surgical abortion is a dangerous procedure, with a high risk of perforation or infection and death. In fact, the risk of complications requiring hospitalization after an abortion is about 2 in 1,000 in the US. These alleged risks are also part of the common assertion that abortion can make future childbearing more difficult or dangerous by increasing the risk of infertility, miscarriages, complications, ectopic pregnancy, or fetal health problems. These claims are not supported by medical data.

CPCs have been found to disseminate misinformation about birth control methods, in particular the idea that contraception and condoms do not work or have harmful effects. False information about pregnancy and the female body, fetal development, the availability of abortion in early pregnancy, and the rate of postpartum depression among women who carry to term may be provided. CPCs may also misinform women about their stage of pregnancy in order to prevent them from seeking an abortion until it is no longer legally possible. The American College of Obstetricians and Gynecologists have found that CPCs are "often non-medical facilities who have no legal obligation to provide pregnant women with accurate information and are not subject to HIPAA or required by law to maintain client confidentiality." A mixed-methods analysis of persons seeking care from CPCs found that people seek out CPCs for pregnancy confirmation, lack of access to healthcare, and abortions. The patients reported a range of positive and negative experiences, but mostly reported reduced options and some deception. Care Net denounces "any form of deception in its corporate advertising or individual conversations with its clients", though it also says of its promotion of an abortion–breast cancer link that its "role is clearly to include this possible risk when [they] educate clients about all the risks of abortions."

A July 2006 report by Representative Henry Waxman (D-CA) and his minority members' staff in the House Committee on Government Reform noted that CPCs had received over $30 million in federal funding since 2001, derived mostly from programs for abstinence-only sex education. For this report, female investigators telephoned CPCs that had received federal funding and posed as pregnant teenagers deciding whether to get an abortion. They found that 20 of the 23 centers (87%) reached provided false or misleading information about the health effects of abortion, particularly about a supposed link between abortion and breast cancer, supposed risks to subsequent fertility, and supposed negative mental health repercussions.

== Religious affiliation ==
The overwhelming majority of CPCs in the U.S. are run by Christians according to a conservative Christian philosophy. As of 2007, two Christian charities, Care Net and Heartbeat International, accounted for 75% of CPCs in the United States. Care Net, the largest CPC network in the United States, is explicitly evangelistic in nature, and says that its "ultimate aim [...] is to share the love and truth of Jesus Christ in both word and deed" and that its "pregnancy centers are committed to sharing the love of Jesus Christ with every person who walks through their doors." Heartbeat International, one of the largest CPC networks in the United States and also the largest CPC network in the world, runs "Christian crisis-pregnancy centers" and describes itself as a "Christian association of faith-based pregnancy resource centers" whose materials are "consistent with Biblical principles". The National Institute of Family and Life Advocates (NIFLA), which works with CPCs on legal issues, "strongly believes that sharing the Gospel is an essential part of counseling women in pregnancy help medical clinics". Some CPCs are run by the Catholic Church or by other church groups. Unaffiliated CPCs, or CPCs affiliated with other organizations, may provide a religious perspective in their counseling.

In contrast to the overt Christian perspective of most CPC networks, Birthright International has a stated philosophy of non-evangelism. A Jewish CPC organization called In Shifra's Arms also exists.

Many CPCs require their staff to be Christian. For example, as a condition of affiliation, Care Net and the Canadian Association of Pregnancy Support Services, the two largest CPC organizations in the United States and Canada, respectively, require each employee and volunteer of a prospective affiliate to comply with a Christian statement of faith. CPCs unaffiliated with either of these may also require staff to be Christian.

Religious activity is sometimes part of a CPC client's experience. Care Net, which "is committed to presenting the gospel of our Lord to women with crisis pregnancies", claims to have effected over 23,000 conversions or restatements of Christian faith. NIFLA "strongly believes that sharing the Gospel is an essential part of counseling women in pregnancy help medical clinics". Some visitors to CPCs report that employees subjected them to unwanted evangelizing.

CPCs outside the United States are also frequently Christian. CareConfidential, the largest umbrella network for CPCs in the United Kingdom, runs "Christian-based pregnancy crisis centres" and is a division of the Christian charity CARE. The Canadian Association of Pregnancy Support Services, a similar network in Canada whose centers may also affiliate with Care Net or Heartbeat International, describes itself as a "Christian charity"; its affiliates "adhere firmly to Christianity". The United States-based Human Life International runs "Catholic pregnancy centers" in Mexico, and it also provides aid to the Centros de Ayuda para la Mujer, a network of CPCs in Latin America whose philosophy is "in conformity with the Magisterium of the Roman Catholic and Apostolic Church." As in the United States, unaffiliated CPCs may also be run by church groups or are otherwise Christian.

=== Affiliation with the anti-abortion movement ===
Most crisis pregnancy centers are affiliated with several major anti-abortion organizations in the United States; these are Care Net, Heartbeat International, Birthright International, and National Institute of Family and Life Advocates (NIFLA). A CPC may be affiliated with more than one network. US-based Care Net and Heartbeat International are the world's two largest CPC networks with about 3,000 associated centers between them in the United States and abroad. Italy, for example, has more than 400 CPCs associated with Heartbeat International, the largest number outside the U.S. The largest UK organisations are CareConfidential and LIFE, while the largest Canadian one is the Canadian Association of Pregnancy Support Services (CAPSS). Human Life International, a Catholic group opposed to abortion, also runs CPCs outside the United States.

== Advertising methods ==
Example of an advertisement for a CPC

CPCs have been criticized for deceptive advertising. Some falsely advertise abortion services, attracting clients who wish to have an abortion. In the 1980s, investigative reporters from the Arizona Republic, the San Francisco Chronicle and CBS News, among others, filed stories about CPCs attracting women by offering free pregnancy tests but then presenting them with religious arguments and scare tactics against abortion. CPCs may intentionally locate near, and look like, abortion clinics; critics have also objected to CPCs' use of rhetoric and advertising language similar to those of abortion providers, such as "Plan Your Parenthood" or a directory listing under "abortion services" or "clinics". These, they say, may mislead pregnant women seeking abortion into contacting a CPC. In particular, the advertising approach of the Pearson Foundation, which assists local groups establishing CPCs, has been criticized by some other anti-abortion groups, including Birthright International, another CPC operator. The foundation recommends that a center seek out women who want abortions through "neutral" advertising, and refuse to answer questions that would reveal that they provide neither abortion services nor referrals to abortion services. Pearson, identified by some as the founder of the first CPC, said that a woman "has no right to information" that will allow her to have an abortion. In Ireland, when abortion was illegal except in circumstances where pregnancy endangered the mother's life and women often went to the United Kingdom to end their pregnancies, "rogue" CPCs, in contrast to government sponsored pregnancy centers, might falsely give the impression in their advertising that they referred women to Britain for abortions or otherwise provided information for women seeking to travel for abortion.

CPCs also use the Internet as a means of advertising. Some use search engine optimization to get their websites closer to the top of search results or bid against abortion providers to appear at the top of sponsored link sections on Google and Yahoo. Heartbeat International, a Christian association that runs 1,800 crisis pregnancy centers, recommends that CPCs use two websites, one fundraising website that describes an anti-abortion mission to secure donors, and another website that purports to provide medical information to attract women seeking contraception, counseling, or abortion.

In August 2022, after a group of 21 Democratic senators criticized Google for displaying CPCs alongside abortion clinics in search and map results when users searched for abortion services, Google stated that they will now clearly demarcate whether a clinic "Provides abortions" or, when Google is unable to verify that the clinic provides abortions: "Might not provide abortions". Yelp stated that it will use new labels to differentiate CPCs into separate categories from clinics which provide abortions.

=== Legality of advertising methods ===
Much legal and legislative action around CPCs has attempted to rein in deceptive advertising by CPCs seeking to give the impression that they provide abortions or other women's health services.

Lawsuits against a number of CPCs have determined that they engaged in false advertising and required them to change their methods, or led to settlements where they agreed to do so. CPCs that advertised that they provided abortion services were forbidden from doing so or obliged to affirmatively tell clients that they did not do so. In some instances, CPCs were prohibited from using names similar to nearby medical clinics that provided abortions, from providing pregnancy tests, or from advertising pregnancy tests as "free" if they were conditional upon hearing a presentation or counseling. In one of these cases, the CPC argued that they did not receive money from clients and were therefore not subject to regulations on commercial speech, but the court ruled that they were not exempt because they aimed to provide services rather than exchange ideas.

Several ordinances requiring CPCs to post signs disclosing that they do not provide abortions, birth control, referrals for either, and sometimes other medical services have been enjoined, with courts finding that such "compelled speech" violates the centers' rights. In December 2009, Baltimore, Maryland was the first local government to introduce and pass a CPC ordinance—Ordinance 09-252, "Limited Service Pregnancy Centers—Disclaimers". Austin, Texas, amended its law requiring centers to disclose that they do not offer abortion or birth control services to instead require them to disclose whether they do offer medical services under the direction of a licensed health care provider. A bill in Oregon would require its CPCs, currently unregulated, to disclose whether or not they provide these services, and bar them from releasing health information collected from clients without the clients' consent. In San Francisco, rather than compelling any speech, the city ordinance is framed as a false advertising law which allows courts to fine CPCs up to $500 every time they falsely imply in an advertisement that they offer abortion services. The law's constitutionality was upheld in federal court, with a judge dismissing a lawsuit from a CPC that had been identified by the city attorney as advertising deceptively.

California's 2015 Reproductive FACT Act requires CPCs without medical licenses to post signs saying that they are not licensed medical facilities and have no medical professionals providing or supervising services; CPCs must also let clients know about the state's public programs for reproductive health care. The law was challenged in National Institute of Family and Life Advocates v. Becerra, argued at the Supreme Court on March 20, 2018, with the Court required to decide whether or not the disclosures required by the California Reproductive FACT Act violated the free speech clause of the First Amendment. The Court ruled on June 26, 2018, in a 5–4 decision that the notices required by the FACT Act violate the First Amendment by targeting speakers rather than speech.

On March 30, 2006, Rep. Carolyn Maloney (D-NY) and eleven co-sponsors first introduced a bill called the "Stop Deceptive Advertising for Women's Services Act", which would have required the Federal Trade Commission to "promulgate rules prohibiting [...] persons from advertising with the intent to deceptively create the impression that such persons provide abortion services" and "enforce violations of such rules as unfair methods of competition and unfair or deceptive acts or practices." Maloney and her colleagues have re-introduced the bill in several Congresses, most recently in May 2013, in the 113th Congress.

In 2002, after an investigation and subpoenas of a number of New York State CPCs alleged to be engaged in deceptive business practices, then-New York Attorney General Eliot Spitzer's office worked out an agreement with one of the CPCs in question, intended to be used as a model, which sets out practices including informing clients that the center does not provide abortion or birth control, that it is not a licensed medical facility, and that the pregnancy tests it provides are over-the-counter.

In the United Kingdom, the Advertising Standards Authority mandated in 2013 that the Central London Women's Centre must stop using "misleading" and "irresponsible" advertisements implying that it offered abortion services.

== Government support ==
Nationally in the US, over $60 million in federal funds were given to crisis pregnancy centers, much of it coming from funding for abstinence-only sex education provided under the conservative George W. Bush administration. Since the fall of Roe v. Wade in 2022, anti-abortion facilities brought in at least $1.4 billion in revenue, with $344 million of that coming from the government. At least 16 states have agreed to send more than $250 million towards "alternative-to-abortion" programs from 2023 through 2025. The number of centers receiving grants is on the rise, as grant amounts increased from $97 million in 2019 to 21 centers in 2022, receiving $344 million in federal grants. These grants included the FEMA-funded Emergency Food and Shelter Program and the Temporary Assistance for Needy Families (TANF). By using these grants to support CPCs, funds are diverted away from the intended beneficiaries of TANF, thereby reducing the financial and structural assistance available to low-income families. Almost immediately after the Supreme Court overturned Roe v. Wade, 38 Republican legislators in Wisconsin sent a letter to Governor Tony Evers demanding that he provide $10 million in Federal ARPA funding to crisis pregnancy centers.

The proceeds from the sale of Choose Life license plates are also used to support CPCs or other organizations explicitly opposed to abortion in 34 states. Of those 34 states, 19 of the states donate a portion of the proceeds raised to specific antichoice organizations or CPCs, 18 donate a portion of the proceeds to agencies or organizations that provide adoption assistance, counseling, training or advertising, one uses the funds raised by the plates to pay for roads and road repairs and 10 states specifically prohibit the allocation of funds raised by the sale of "Choose Life" license plates to agencies or organizations that provide abortion services, counseling, referrals or advertising. Motorists in these states can request these plates and pay between $25 and $70 on top of standard fees for the plate. A portion of the fee is used by the state to fund adoption support organizations and crisis pregnancy centers. In July 2013, then-Governor of Rhode Island Lincoln Chafee vetoed a bill for the license plates, saying that, in his opinion, it violated the separation of church and state.

Since 2010, at least 13 U.S. states have subsidized crisis pregnancy centers. These included Florida, Louisiana, Minnesota, Missouri, North Dakota, Indiana, Ohio, North Carolina, Georgia, Oklahoma, Michigan, Pennsylvania, and Texas. They have funneled $495 million to CPCs. Efforts are led by anti-abortion Republicans. Some notable examples of the extent of these subsidies after the overturning of Roe v. Wade include Florida's increase from $4.5 million to $25 million and Tennessee's from $3 million to $20 million in state funding between 2022 and 2023.

Under the first Trump administration, CPCs were encouraged to apply for Title X funding, which is intended to go to organisations offering family planning services. Funding provided through Title X for family planning services has historically been off-limits for abortion services. Healthcare organizations like Planned Parenthood, receive Title X funding for services like contraception, breast cancer and cervical cancer screening, and testing for sexually transmitted infections, while separate, non-Title X funds are allocated for abortion services. Most CPCs struggled to qualify because offering hormonal birth control, which many CPCs oppose, is a requirement to receive the grants. One CPC organisation, The Obria Group, was awarded millions in grants in 2019 after promising to provide those services in some clinics, despite not currently offering them. In 2019, alterations to Title X, commonly referred to as the "domestic gag rule," further tightened regulations, forbidding Title X providers from offering comprehensive pregnancy counseling or referring patients for abortion services. This prohibition meant that clients could not rely on their healthcare providers for accurate and thorough information regarding abortion. Although these changes were reversed as of November 2021, they prompted many grantees, including Planned Parenthood, which previously served about 40% of Title X-dependent patients for family planning services, to withdraw. Consequently, six states were temporarily left without Title X-funded services. This illustrates how political opposition to abortion can directly impede access to comprehensive reproductive healthcare services. Title X funding is available in all 50 states as of 2024, with varying budgets.

On May 10, 2026, coinciding with Mother's Day in the United States, the second Trump administration's Department of Health and Human Services launched a portal for new mothers and women facing unplanned pregnancies. The site features an option to find pregnancy centers.

=== Mandatory use of CPCs ===
South Dakota enacted a law in 2011 that would have required consultation at a crisis pregnancy center as a precondition to obtaining an abortion. The law, which was to take effect in July 2011, also would have established a three-day waiting period, the longest in the country. In June 2011, Judge Karen Schreier issued a preliminary injunction blocking the law from going into effect, writing that the provisions "constitute a substantial obstacle to a woman's decision to obtain an abortion because they force a woman against her will to disclose her decision to undergo an abortion to a pregnancy help center employee before she can undergo an abortion." Although the law remained enjoined, the state later enacted another law which excluded weekends and holidays from the 72-hour waiting period mandated for a person seeking an abortion, potentially extending the wait for the procedure to six days, so that only days when CPCs were already open would count as part of the period. In some cases, judges responsible for granting judicial bypasses to minors have required them to go to a CPC for counseling before having an abortion.

=== Confusion with government-supported centers in Ireland ===
In Ireland, centres not affiliated with the government exist that attempt to persuade women not to have an abortion. These have been reported to "use manipulation and alarmist information", including false medical information, and have been called "rogue agencies". The term crisis pregnancy is used by abortion-rights agencies like the Irish Family Planning Association.

In September 2018, the Eighth Amendment, stating that the law recognizes the rights of the unborn, was removed from the Constitution. Five years after the repeal of Ireland's extreme abortion ban, the rule remained only up to twelve weeks for termination; anytime after must be accompanied by extreme circumstances.

The government's Crisis Pregnancy Programme (formerly Crisis Pregnancy Agency) funds crisis pregnancy initiatives and is in turn reimbursed by the Health Service Executive. Nevertheless, crisis pregnancy counseling grants, provided through a campaign called "Positive Options", are only awarded to centres that offer non-directive and medically accurate counselling that discusses all possible options, including travelling abroad for abortion. Government-sponsored centres' efforts to reduce the number of women who opt for abortion consist primarily of the provision of "services and supports which make other options more attractive." A survey by the CPP found that 4 in 46 women surveyed encountered a "rogue agency" when seeking counseling. The Department of Health does not regulate the anti-abortion agencies, since the 1995 Abortion Information Act, which establishes that Irish women have a right to know about abortion services abroad and which regulates providers of information, does not apply to centres that do not provide information on abortion.

== Attacks and vandalism against CPCs ==
Some CPCs have been damaged or destroyed in several types of incidents, with some directly attributed to criminal action and others spurring further investigation. On 1 February 2019, a CPC in Culpeper, Virginia, was vandalized with spray painted phrases that included "'fake,' 'you hate women,' and other vulgarities", spurring a police investigation. An arson attack against a Peoria, Illinois, CPC on 3 May 2021 caused $250,000 in damages. This attack came shortly after the declassification of a Department of Homeland Security document that categorized both anti-abortion and pro-abortion rights "extremists" as "domestic violent extremist groups".

=== Dobbs-related incidents ===
In the month following the May 2022 publication of a leaked draft opinion in the Dobbs v. Jackson Women's Health Organization U.S. Supreme Court case, several instances of violence against crisis pregnancy centers were reported by the Department of Homeland Security. The DHS issued a memo following the ruling's official release in June that cited these incidents as the basis for warning of potential violence extending "for weeks" following the overturn of Roe v. Wade while simultaneously affirming that "freedom of speech and right to peacefully protest are fundamental Constitutional rights." On 25 June, several days following the ruling's release, a fire at a Longmont, Colorado, Christian pregnancy center caused "fire and heavy smoke damage" with no injuries. Graffiti at the scene read "If abortions aren't safe, neither are you." The fire has been investigated with FBI assistance as an arson attack. Employees of the center accused "pro-abortion" militant organization Jane's Revenge of starting the fire.

Additional suspected incidents of arson against crisis pregnancy centers and anti-abortion groups had been reported before the ruling was announced. In May, Jane's Revenge had claimed responsibility for an arson attack against a Madison, Wisconsin, "Judeo-Christian" anti-abortion office. Following the Madison attack, two firefighters were injured responding to a suspected arson attack at a Buffalo, New York-area Christian pregnancy center in early June. A few days later, the ATF and Oregon authorities investigated a fire "suspicious in nature" that damaged a Christian pregnancy center in Gresham on 10 June. "'Thousands' of dollars" of damage to a Southfield, Michigan, CPC on 16 September was attributed to Jane's Revenge. Catholic News Agency reported that there were 82 total instances of abortion-rights-related vandalism, theft, and arson between early May and 22 July 2022. Of these, 50 were against pregnancy centers. In January 2023, the FBI announced they were offering a $25,000 reward for providing "information leading to the identification, arrest, and conviction of the suspect(s)" in the attacks, while a CPC operator announced it would hire private investigators.

== See also ==
- Misinformation related to abortion
- National Institute of Family and Life Advocates v. Becerra
- Pregnancy options counseling
