= Care Net =

Evangelical Christian crisis pregnancy center organization

Carenet
- Formation: Tax-exempt since July 1987; 39 years ago
- Type: 501(c)(3)
- Headquarters: Lansdowne, Virginia
- Revenue: 9,734,464 USD (2024)
- Expenses: 9,247,854 USD (2024)
- Website: care-net.org

Care Net is an evangelical Christian network of crisis pregnancy centers operating primarily in the United States. As an anti-abortion organization, its centers seek to persuade women not to have abortions. Headquartered in Northern Virginia, it is one of the nation's two largest networks of crisis pregnancy centers (along with Heartbeat International).

== History ==
According to its literature, Care Net was influenced by the leadership of former U.S. Surgeon General Dr. C. Everett Koop and Christian apologist Dr. Francis Schaeffer. The organization was founded in 1975 as the Christian Action Council by Dr. Harold O. J. Brown, with its primary focus to engage evangelicals in responding to the "abortion crisis". It opened its first crisis pregnancy center in 1983. One of its primary strategies was the picketing of abortion clinics.

In the 1990s, the organization’s mission shifted toward supporting anti-abortion crisis pregnancy centers, including a boycott of Planned Parenthood and corporations that had business relationships with Planned Parenthood, such as AT&T. In 1999, the organization changed its name to Care Net. Care Net reports having 1,100 affiliated pregnancy centers across North America. In 2012, Roland C. Warren, former president of the National Fatherhood Initiative, joined Care Net as president and CEO.

== Activities ==
In addition to counseling clients against abortion, Care Net affiliated centers may provide mothers with services such as temporary shelter, help with jobs, debt and welfare applications, Bible study, and baby supplies such as used clothing, diapers and formula. Care Net, like other CPC networks, touts medically disputed or discredited information about the supposed health risks of abortion; it sometimes locates its centers near Planned Parenthood clinics and uses signs that read "Pregnant? Considering abortion? Free services," or otherwise advertises them as though they were medical clinics. Some Care Net affiliated clinics offer ultrasounds. Care Net pregnancy centers have been honored by at least fifteen state legislatures, according to advocacy organization Americans United for Life.
