= Abortion and mental health =

Mental effects of undergoing an abortion

Scientific and medical expert bodies have repeatedly concluded that abortion poses no greater mental health risks than carrying an unintended pregnancy to term. In contrast, mental health risks do occur in places with restrictive abortion laws due to abortion stigma.

In 2008, the American Psychological Association concluded after a review of available evidence that induced abortion did not increase the risk of mental-health problems. In 2011, the U.K. National Collaborating Centre for Mental Health similarly concluded that first-time abortion in the first trimester does not increase the risk of mental-health problems compared with bringing the pregnancy to term. In 2018, The National Academies of Sciences, Engineering, and Medicine concluded that abortion does not lead to depression, anxiety, or post-traumatic stress disorder. The U.K. Royal College of Obstetricians and Gynaecologists likewise summarized the evidence by finding that abortion did not increase the risk of mental-health problems compared to women carrying an unwanted pregnancy to term. Two studies conducted on the Danish population in 2011 and 2012 analysed the association between abortion and psychiatric admission found no increase in admissions after an abortion. The same study, in fact, found an increase in psychiatric admission after first child-birth. A 2008 systematic review of the medical literature on abortion and mental health found that high-quality studies consistently showed few or no mental-health consequences of abortion, while poor-quality studies were more likely to report negative consequences.

Despite the weight of scientific and medical opinion, some anti-abortion advocacy groups have continued to allege a link between abortion and mental-health problems. Some anti-abortion groups have used the term "post-abortion syndrome" to refer to negative psychological effects which they attribute to abortion. However, "post-abortion syndrome" is not recognized as an actual syndrome by the mainstream medical community. Post-abortion syndrome (PAS) is not included in the Diagnostic and Statistical Manual of Mental Disorders DSM-IV-TR or in the ICD-10 list of psychiatric conditions. Medical professionals and pro-choice advocates have argued that the effort to popularize the idea of a "post-abortion syndrome" is a tactic used by anti-abortion advocates for political purposes. Some U.S. state legislatures have mandated that patients be told that abortion increases their risk of depression and suicide, despite the scientific evidence contradicting such claims.

== Current scientific evidence ==
Systematic reviews of the scientific literature have concluded that there are no differences in the long-term mental health of women who obtain induced abortions as compared to women in appropriate control groups—that is, those who carry unplanned pregnancies to term. These studies have consistently found no causal relationship between abortion and mental-health problems. While some studies have reported a statistical correlation between abortion and mental health problems, these studies are typically methodologically flawed and fail to account for confounding factors, or, as with results of women having multiple abortions, yield results inconsistent with other similar studies. The correlations observed in some studies may be explained by pre-existing social circumstances and emotional or mental health problems. Various factors, such as emotional attachment to the pregnancy, lack of support, and conservative views on abortion may increase the likelihood of experiencing negative reactions.

Major medical and psychiatric expert groups have consistently found that abortion does not cause mental-health problems. In 2008, the American Psychological Association reviewed the literature on abortion and mental health and concluded that the risk of mental health problems following a single, first-trimester induced abortion of an adult women is no greater than carrying an unwanted pregnancy to term. While observing that abortion may both relieve stress and "engender additional stress," they explicitly rejected the idea that abortion is "inherently traumatic." Among those women who do experience mental health issues following an abortion, the APA concluded that these issues are most likely related to pre-existing risk factors. Since these and other risk factors may also predispose some women to more negative reactions following a birth, the higher rates of mental illness observed among women with a prior history of abortion are more likely to be caused by these other factors than by abortion itself. The panel noted severe inconsistency between the outcomes reported by studies on the effect of multiple abortions. Additionally, the same factors which predispose a woman to multiple unwanted pregnancies may also predispose her to mental health difficulties. Therefore, they declined to draw a firm conclusion on studies concerning multiple abortions.

In December 2011, the U.K. Royal College of Psychiatrists undertook a systematic review to clarify the question of whether abortion had harmful effects on women's mental health. The review, conducted by the National Collaborating Centre for Mental Health and funded by the U.K. Department of Health, concluded that while unwanted pregnancy may increase the risk of mental-health problems, women faced with unwanted pregnancies have similar rates of mental-health problems whether they choose to carry the pregnancy to term or to have an abortion.

A 2020 long term-study among US women found that about 99% of women felt that they made the right decision five years after they had an abortion. Relief was the primary emotion with few women feeling sadness or guilt. Some women do experience negative emotions after an abortion, but not at rates different from women who wanted an abortion and did not have one or from women who have miscarriages. Women having abortions may receive support from abortion providers, or national call centers like Exhale.

Social stigma is a significant factor predicting negative emotions and regret years later. Subsequent emotions about an abortion are "associated with personal and social context, and are not a product of the abortion procedure itself." Academic studies have also concluded that shaming affects mental health after an abortion. Nearly two-thirds of women who received abortions thought it would cause people to look down on them, and the perceived social stigma is associated with psychological distress years later. One study concluded: "religiosity was strongly associated with overall perceived abortion stigma." Catholics and Protestants felt more stigma than nonreligious women, and women with the strongest religious beliefs had the strongest perceptions of community condemnation. Stigma related to abortion is an area of ongoing research, and has a broad definition. An influential definition frames it as a perceived failure to uphold ideals of womanhood, such as fertility and nurturing. Planned Parenthood, an abortion-rights advocate and provider, describes abortion stigma as a transgression of "the expectation of sexual purity, or sexuality reserved for reproduction, and the expectation of motherhood and nurturing."

== Post-abortion syndrome ==
The idea that abortion has negative psychological effects was widely promoted by crisis pregnancy centers in the 1970s and the term "post-abortion syndrome" has widely been used by anti-abortion advocates to broadly include any negative emotional reactions attributed to abortion.

Post-abortion syndrome has not been validated as a discrete psychiatric condition and is not recognized by the American Psychological Association, the American Psychiatric Association, the American Medical Association, the American College of Obstetricians and Gynecologists, nor the American Public Health Association. The Guttmacher Institute reports that as of August 2018, of the 22 U.S. states that include information on possible psychological responses to abortion, eight states stress negative emotional responses.

== Legal and political history ==
Under the 1967 Abortion Act, abortion in the United Kingdom was legalized only when two doctors agreed that carrying the pregnancy to term would be detrimental to a woman's physical or mental health. Consideration of mental health also played a role in the 1973 U.S. Supreme Court decision Roe v. Wade which ruled that state governments may not prohibit late terminations of pregnancy when "necessary to preserve the [woman's] life or health". This rule was clarified by the 1973 judicial decision Doe v. Bolton, which specifies "that the medical judgment may be exercised in the light of all factors—physical, emotional, psychological, familial, and the woman's age—relevant to the well-being of the patient." It is by this provision that women in the US can legally choose abortion when screenings reveal abnormalities of a viable fetus.

In 1987, U.S. President Ronald Reagan directed U.S. Surgeon General C. Everett Koop, an evangelical Christian and abortion opponent, to issue a report on the health effects of abortion. Reportedly, the idea for the review was conceived as a political gambit by Reagan advisors Dinesh D'Souza and Gary Bauer, who believed that such a report would "rejuvenate" the anti-abortion movement by producing evidence of the risks of abortion. Koop was reluctant to accept the assignment, believing that Reagan was more concerned with appeasing his political base than with improving women's health.

Koop ultimately reviewed over 250 studies pertaining to the psychological impact of abortion. In January 1989, Koop wrote in a letter to Reagan that "scientific studies do not provide conclusive data about the health effects of abortion on women." Koop acknowledged the political context of the question in his letter, writing: "In the minds of some of [Reagan's advisors], it was a foregone conclusion that the negative health effects of abortion on women were so overwhelming that the evidence would force the reversal of Roe vs. Wade." In later testimony before the United States Congress, Koop stated that the quality of existing evidence was too poor to prepare a report that "could withstand scientific and statistical scrutiny". Koop added that "there is no doubt about the fact that some people have severe psychological effects after abortion, but anecdotes do not make good scientific material." In his congressional testimony, Koop stated that while psychological responses to abortion may be "overwhelming" in individual cases, the psychological risks of abortion were "minuscule from a public health perspective."

Subsequently, a Congressional committee charged that Koop refused to publish the results of his review because he failed to find evidence that abortion was harmful, and that Koop watered down his findings in his letter to Reagan by claiming that the studies were inconclusive. Congressman Theodore S. Weiss (D-NY), who oversaw the investigation, argued that when Koop found no evidence that abortion was harmful, he "decided not to issue a report, but instead to write a letter to the president which would be sufficiently vague as to avoid supporting the pro-choice position that abortion is safe for women."

Later in 1989, responding to the political debate over the question, the American Psychological Association (APA) undertook a review of the scientific literature. Their review, published in the journal Science, concluded that "the weight of the evidence from scientific studies indicates that legal abortion of an unwanted pregnancy in the first trimester does not pose a psychological hazard for most women." The APA task force also concluded that "severe negative reactions after abortions are rare and can best be understood in the framework of coping with normal life stress."

In 1994, the U.K.'s House of Lord's Commission of Inquiry into the Operation and Consequences of The Abortion Act published a report (commonly referred to as the Rawlinson Report) which concluded that there was no scientific evidence that abortion provided any mental health benefits but instead may put women at risk for psychiatric illness greater than if woman carried to term. The Commission recommended that abortion providers "should initiate independent and long-term follow up of those clients considered to be most at risk of emotional distress." In a press release, the Rawlinson commission stated that the Royal College of Psychiatrists (RCP) had provided written testimony stating that there are "no psychiatric indications for abortion," noting that this "raises serious questions given that 91% of abortion are carried out on the grounds of the mental health of the mother." In response, the RCP issued a statement that the Rawlinson commissions summary of their written statement was "an inaccurate portrayal of the College's views on abortion," adding that "There is no evidence of increase risk of major psychiatric disorder or of long lasting psychological distress [following abortion]".

In 2006, the U.K.'s House of Commons Science and Technology Committee undertook another inquiry into scientific developments and included a request for the RCP to update their 1994 statement on abortion in light of more recent studies. In 2008, the RCP did update their position statement to recommend that women should be screened for risk factors that may be associated with subsequent development of mental health problems and should be counselled about the possible mental health risks of abortion. The revised RCP position statement included a recommendation for a systematic review of abortion and mental health with special consideration of "whether there is evidence for psychiatric indications for abortion." This modified opinion was influenced by a growing body of literature showing a link between abortion and mental health problems, including a 30-year longitudinal study of about 500 women born in Christchurch New Zealand, and a Cornwall inquest into the abortion related suicide of a well known British artist, Emma Beck. This recommendation resulted in the 2011 review conducted by the National Collaborating Centre for Mental Health.

== See also ==
- Abortion
- Childbirth-related posttraumatic stress disorder
- Postpartum depression and Postpartum psychosis
- Psychiatric disorders of childbirth
