= Heartbeat International =

International network of pro-life pregnancy resource centers

Heartbeat International Inc
- Formation: Tax-exempt since January 1974; 52 years ago
- Type: 501(c)(3)
- Headquarters: Columbus, Ohio
- Revenue: 10,189,676 USD (2024)
- Expenses: 10,128,538 USD (2024)
- Website: heartbeatinternational.org

Heartbeat International is an international anti-abortion association that supports the largest network of crisis pregnancy centers (CPC) in the world, with over 2,000 affiliates in 50 countries. It does not offer, recommend, or refer for abortions. Heartbeat International describes itself as an "Interdenominational Christian association". Heartbeat International teaches its affiliated members to make their advertising look as though they are full-service reproductive health clinics that provide referrals for birth control or abortion. Staff are also trained on how to discourage pregnant women from accessing abortion, and how to discourage young women from using emergency contraception, birth control pills, or IUDs. Heartbeat staff are also encouraged to create two websites, one that has an explicitly Christian message, and one that looks like Planned Parenthood. Many pregnancy centers have the ultimate goal of converting women through a born-again experience to "save the mother, save the baby".

For a story appearing in February 2020, openDemocracy sent "feminist investigative journalists" to 30 Heartbeat International crisis pregnancy centers in 18 countries, where they "were given misleading or manipulative counselling in most cases." The reporters, who posed as women with unwanted pregnancies, found cases where women were told falsehoods such as abortion causing mental illness, cancer, or increased risk of child abuse, along with other misinformation.

In January 2016, Jor-El Godsey was named President of Heartbeat International.
