= List of anti-abortion organizations in the United States =

This article is a list of anti-abortion organizations in the United States. Individual organizations on this list may either be primarily oriented towards anti-abortion activism, or have adopted anti-abortion positions while not actively campaigning.

== National organizations ==
=== Physicians' associations ===
- American College of Pediatricians (ACPeds), a group of conservative doctors
- Association of American Physicians and Surgeons (AAPS), a politically conservative non-profit association aimed to "fight socialized medicine and to fight the government takeover of medicine"

=== Political party-affiliated organizations ===
- American Solidarity Party (ASP), supports a consistent life ethic, opposing abortion, euthanasia, assisted suicide, and capital punishment
- Constitution Party, a conservative political party opposing abortion, suicide, and euthanasia
- Democrats for Life of America (DFLA), a tax-exempt political advocacy nonprofit organization that seeks to elect anti-abortion Democrats and to encourage the Democratic Party to espouse a consistent life ethic view
- Libertarians for Life, a nonsectarian group expressing an opposition to abortion within the context of libertarianism and adheres to the belief that abortion is not a right, but "a wrong under justice"
- Republican National Coalition for Life (RNCL), an organization formed to maintain the commitment of the Republican Party to anti-abortion principles
- Republican Party

=== Other organizations ===
- 40 Days for Life, an anti-abortion activist group, named for the pattern of several biblical events lasting 40 days
- Abolitionists Rising (formerly Free the States), a national, Protestant anti-abortion organization based in Oklahoma that advocates for the total abolition of abortion
- Alliance Defending Freedom (ADF, formerly Alliance Defense Fund), a conservative nonprofit organization with the stated goal of "defending the right to hear and speak the Truth through strategy, training, funding, and litigation"
- Alpha Center, a nonprofit agency founded by Leslee Unruh (also its CEO) whose stated goal is to provide positive alternatives with practical support to women and men involved in an unplanned pregnancy
- American Center for Law & Justice (ACLJ), a politically conservative social activism organization founded to protect constitutional and human rights worldwide, and which generally pursues constitutional issues and conservative Christian ideals in courts of law
- American Coalition of Life Activists (ACLA), a now-defunct advocacy group which made controversies surrounding their use of Wanted-style posters to target abortion providers
- American Family Association (AFA), a nonprofit organization that opposes abortion, pornography, and same-sex marriage
- American Vision, a nonprofit organization which operates as a Christian ministry and calls for "equipping and empowering Christians to restore America’s biblical foundation"
- Americans United for Life (AUL), an anti-abortion public interest law firm and advocacy group which calls for protection of human life at all stages of life, from conception to death, and is involved in the related issues of health and biotechnology
- Arlington Group, a coalition which unites the leaders of prominent Christian conservative organizations in the U.S.
- Bound4life, a grassroots nonprofit organization whose major goal is to train and multiply the number of Christians that pray regularly for the ending of abortion
- Care Net, an operator of crisis pregnancy centers in the U.S.
- Center for Bio-Ethical Reform, an organization generally promulgating right to life views which uses graphic images of aborted fetuses
- Center for Medical Progress (CMP), an organization founded in 2013 by activist David Daleiden also known for its undercover video sting operation in a Planned Parenthood clinic with the accusation that the reproductive health service provider sells fetal body parts and tissues for profit
- Choose Life, Inc., an advocacy group based in Ocala, Florida that created the concept behind the "Choose Life" specialty license plate that promotes an anti-abortion message: to choose adoption over abortion
- Christian Coalition of America (CCA), an interdenominational Christian advocacy group
- Concerned Women for America, a politically conservative Christian women's activist group whose stated mission, "is to protect and promote Biblical values among all citizens—first through prayer, then education, and finally by influencing our society—thereby reversing the decline in moral values in our nation"
- Eagle Forum, a conservative interest group that uses grassroots techniques to promote conservative women's and family issues in public policy
- Elliot Institute, an advocacy group founded by electrical engineer and anti-abortion activist David Reardon, studies "the effects of eugenics, abortion, population control, and sexual attitudes and practices on individuals and society at large"
- Faith and Freedom Coalition, an ecumenical nonprofit organization which opposes abortion and same-sex marriage, and supports limited government, lower taxes, education reform, free markets, a strong national defense, and Israel
- Family Research Council
- Feminists for Life, a nonprofit, non-governmental organization that promotes anti-abortion views on the basis of feminism
- Focus on the Family (FOTF or FotF), whose stated mission is "nurturing and defending the God-ordained institution of the family and promoting biblical truths worldwide"
- Justice House of Prayer (JHOP), a neocharismatic organization which focuses on prayer for issues such as abortion, same-sex marriage, and humanism, and also regularly practices fasting
- Life Chain, one of the largest anti-abortion social movement organization in America
- Life Dynamics Inc., an organization whose stated motto is, "Pro-Life: without compromise, without exception, without apology"
- Live Action, a nonprofit organization that is best known for its undercover video sting operations on Planned Parenthood clinics, co-founded by anti-abortion activist Lila Rose
- The Lord's Ranch, an outreach ministry for the poor located in Vado, New Mexico; part of their ministry includes anti-abortion work
- March for Life, an annual event held in Washington, D.C., on or around the anniversary of Roe v. Wade, organized by the March for Life Education and Defense Fund
- MassResistance, a Waltham, Massachusetts-based group that promotes socially conservative positions on issues relating to homosexuality, abortion, anti-bullying, gun control, the transgender community and same-sex marriage
- Missionaries to the Preborn, an advocacy group founded by Rev. Matthew Trewhella in 1990 in Milwaukee, Wisconsin
- National Institute of Family and Life Advocates, founded in 1993 which aims in "developing a network of life-affirming ministries in every community across the nation in order to achieve an abortion-free America"
- National Pro-Life Religious Council (NPRC), a coalition representing numerous Christian anti-abortion denominations and organizations in the U.S.
- National Right to Life Committee, the oldest and largest national anti-abortion organization in the US, which works through legislation and education to work against induced abortion, infanticide, euthanasia and assisted suicide
- The Nurturing Network, an international charitable organization dedicated to relieving the many forms of abuse, neglect and exploitation that exist in a global world
- Operation Rescue (Kansas) (formerly Operation Rescue West or California Operation Rescue), engages in activities that it describes as "on the cutting edge of the abortion issue, taking direct action to restore legal personhood to the pre-born and stop abortion in obedience to biblical mandates"
- Operation Save America (formerly Operation Rescue National), opposes abortion and its legality, as well as same-sex marriage
- Population Research Institute (PRI), a nonprofit organization whose stated goals are "to expose the myth of overpopulation" as well as "human rights abuses committed in population control programs, and to make the case that people are the world's greatest resource"
- Pro-Life Action League, a Chicago-based activist group founded in 1980 currently led by Eric Scheidler
- Pro-Life Alliance of Gays and Lesbians (PLAGAL), an interest group opposed to legalized elective abortion and supportive of alternatives to abortion, which is inclusive of all LGBT people as well as straight allies
- Secular Pro-Life (SPL), an all-volunteer organization which works to end elective abortion and to incorporate non-religious people into the U.S. anti-abortion movement
- Silent No More, an organization for people who regret that they or their partners had abortions
- Stoneridge Group, a political campaign marketing firm based in Alpharetta, Georgia
- Students for Life of America (SFLA) or simply Students for Life (SFL), a tax-exempt nonprofit organization that seeks to end abortion, euthanasia, and infanticide by educating students about these issues and identifying anti-abortion student leaders and giving them the training, skills, and resources to effectively spread their message
- Survivors of the Abortion Holocaust, a group which uses graphic imagery of aborted fetuses in protest against abortion
- Susan B. Anthony Pro-Life America, a social welfare, nonprofit organization that seeks to reduce and ultimately end abortion in the U.S. by supporting anti-abortion politicians, primarily women, through its SBA List Candidate Fund political action committee
- TheCall, practices prayer and fasting in protest against issues such as same-sex marriage and legal access to elective abortion
- Thomas More Law Center (TMLC), a conservative, nonprofit, public interest law firm promoting what it describes as Judeo-Christian heritage and moral values in defense against same-sex marriage and abortion
- Thomas More Society, a Chicago-based conservative anti-abortion law firm
- Traditional Values Coalition (TVC), a conservative organization preserving what they describe as "Bible-based traditional values", which include "Defending human life from its earliest moments to natural death"
- United Families International (UFI), a nonprofit organization that works on an international scale to influence public policy toward "maintaining and strengthening the family"
- Vision America, a politically conservative organization which describes itself as formed to "inform, encourage and mobilize pastors and their congregations to be proactive in restoring Judeo-Christian values to the moral and civic framework in their communities, states, and our nation"
- VoteYesForLife.com, a campaign whose executive director is anti-abortion activist Leslee Unruh
- Women Exploited By Abortion (WEBA), an organization of women who regret having undergone induced abortion
- Young America's Foundation (YAF), a conservative youth organization

== Religiously-affiliated organizations ==
=== Anglican ===
- Anglicans for Life (AFL), an anti-abortion ministry of the Anglican Church in North America

=== Roman Catholic ===
- American Life League (ALL), a grassroots organization which has adopted a no-exceptions, no-compromise position against abortion and all forms of contraception, embryonic stem cell research and euthanasia
- American Society for the Defense of Tradition, Family and Property (TFP), an organization of Catholic laymen that promotes traditionalist values, including opposition to abortion, assisted suicide, LGBT rights (including same-sex marriage), socialism, and communism
- Catholic Answers, a lay apostolate of Catholic apologetics and evangelization
- Catholic Family and Human Rights Institute, a research institute and think tank that seeks to monitor and affect the policy debate at the United Nations and other international institutions
- CatholicVote.org, a nonprofit political advocacy group that acknowledges the authority of the Church's Magisterium, but is technically independent of the Church
- EWTN, a Catholic television network
- Knights of Columbus (K of C), the world's largest Catholic fraternal service organization, whose advocacy typically deals with Catholic family and anti-abortion issues; has adopted resolutions advocating a culture of life
- Priests for Life (PFL), a group of Catholic priests working to end abortion and euthanasia
- Sisters of Life (S.V.), a contemplative and active Catholic religious institute under the Augustinian rule, devoted to the promotion of anti-abortion causes
- United States Conference of Catholic Bishops (USCCB)

=== United Methodist ===
- Taskforce of United Methodists on Abortion and Sexuality, an organization committed in reversing the United States Supreme Court decision Roe v. Wade, "by first providing theological leadership within the church, which will set an example that political, legal and cultural forces will follow"

== State and local organizations ==
=== Arizona ===
- Center for Arizona Policy (CAP), an Arizona-based nonprofit conservative lobbying group

=== California ===
- SaveCalifornia.com, a nonprofit organization founded as part of Campaign for Children and Families (CCF), active in influencing public policy on various social issues

=== Colorado ===
- Colorado Family Action, a lobbying organization founded in 2007 that opposes same-sex marriage and adoption, birth control access, and abortion
- Colorado Right to Life (CRTL), a Colorado-based advocacy group which believes all human beings not convicted of a capital crime have a right to life from the moment of fertilization until natural death

=== Connecticut ===
- Family Institute of Connecticut, an interdenominational, conservative tax-exempt nonprofit organization whose stated goal is to encourage and strengthen the family as the foundation of society and to promote Judeo-Christian ethical and moral values in the culture and government of Connecticut

=== Georgia ===
- Georgia Right to Life (GRTL), a Georgia-based nonprofit advocacy group organized for activities in the areas of education, legislation, and political action to oppose legalized abortion, euthanasia, embryonic stem cell research, human cloning and artificially produced genetic transformation

=== Illinois ===
- Illinois Family Institute (IFI), a Christian nonprofit organization opposed to abortion, separation of church and state, "activist judges", the "marriage penalty", civil unions, same-sex marriage, gambling and drug legalization based in Illinois

=== Minnesota ===
- Minnesota Citizens Concerned for Life (MCCL), the oldest and largest right-to-life organization in Minnesota founded in 1968 to resist the legalization of abortion, as well as euthanasia, assisted suicide and embryonic stem cell research
- Minnesota Family Council (MFC), a Christian organization founded to work against the teaching in schools of tolerance for homosexuals and is also opposed to abortion, stating that "human life is sacred from conception to natural death and must be protected by government"

=== Missouri ===
- Missouri Family Policy Council, conservative Christian lobbying organization that seeks to regulate strip clubs, abortion, and same-sex marriage

=== Nebraska ===
- Nebraska Family Alliance, a Lincoln, Nebraska lobbying group that advocates for traditional gender roles and conservative Christian views on public policy

=== New York ===
- Conservative Party of New York State
- New York State Catholic Conference
- New York State Right to Life Committee
- New Yorkers for Constitutional Freedoms

=== Ohio ===
- Citizens for Community Values, an obscenity censorship group founded in 1983 that has expanded to other matters of conservative Christian sexual morality in public policy
- Ohio Right to Life
- Right to Life Action Coalition of Ohio (RTLACO), a grassroots coalition of over 30 Ohio pro‑life organizations formed in 2017, focusing on legislative advocacy, candidate endorsement, and direct action; has supported "heartbeat" bills

=== Texas ===
- American Pregnancy Association, a nonprofit which operates a pregnancy education website
- Texas Alliance for Life, a nonprofit organization which opposes abortion (except to preserve the mother's life), infanticide, euthanasia, and all forms of assisted suicide

=== Virginia ===
- Family Foundation of Virginia, a lobbying organization focused originally on opposition to sex education that has expanded to opposition to abortion, same-sex marriage, and the Equal Rights Amendment
- Virginia Society for Human Life (VSHL), a nonprofit organization advocating an end to abortion in Virginia; the oldest anti-abortion organization in the US

== See also ==
- List of abortion-rights organizations in the United States
