= Family Policy Alliance =

American Christian lobbying group

- Founded: 2004; 22 years ago
- Founder: James Dobson
- Tax ID no.: 20-0960855 (EIN)
- Location(s): 8605 Explorer Dr; Colorado Springs, Colorado, U.S. 80920
- Key people: Craig DeRoche (President & CEO)
- Revenue: $2,435,770 for the 501(c)3 $1,314,136 for the 501(c)4 (2022)
- Website: familypolicyalliance.com
- Formerly called: CitizenLink, Focus on the Family Action

Family Policy Alliance (FPA), formerly CitizenLink and Focus on the Family Action, is an American conservative Christian organization that acts as the lobbying arm of Focus on the Family at the level of state government politics. It is an umbrella organization for an "alliance" of state organizations known as Family Policy Councils which are state-level Focus on the Family affiliates.

The stated mission of Family Policy Alliance is "to advance biblical citizenship, equip and elect statesmen, promote policy and serve an effective alliance, all committed to a common vision". The organization opposes and advocates against same-sex marriage, transgender rights, legal abortion, sexual consent education, marijuana decriminalization, and the Equal Rights Amendment. CEO Craig DeRoche considers these social phenomena "a demonic onslaught" which he attributes to Satan. FPA supports Reaganomics and traditional gender roles. It considers LGBT rights to be a dangerous "LGBT agenda."

As an organization with 501(c)(4) tax status, FPA faces fewer political lobbying restrictions than its affiliate Focus on the Family. FPA lobbying includes "rigorous training by experienced Christian legislative leaders" for politicians who align with the organization's conservative priorities. The organization maintains a 501(c)(3) called Family Policy Foundation or alternatively Family Policy Alliance Foundation. It is a different organization than The Family Foundation, although both are a part of Focus on the Family and have similar goals.

It was founded in 2004 by James Dobson and operates from Focus on the Family headquarters in Colorado Springs.

== History ==
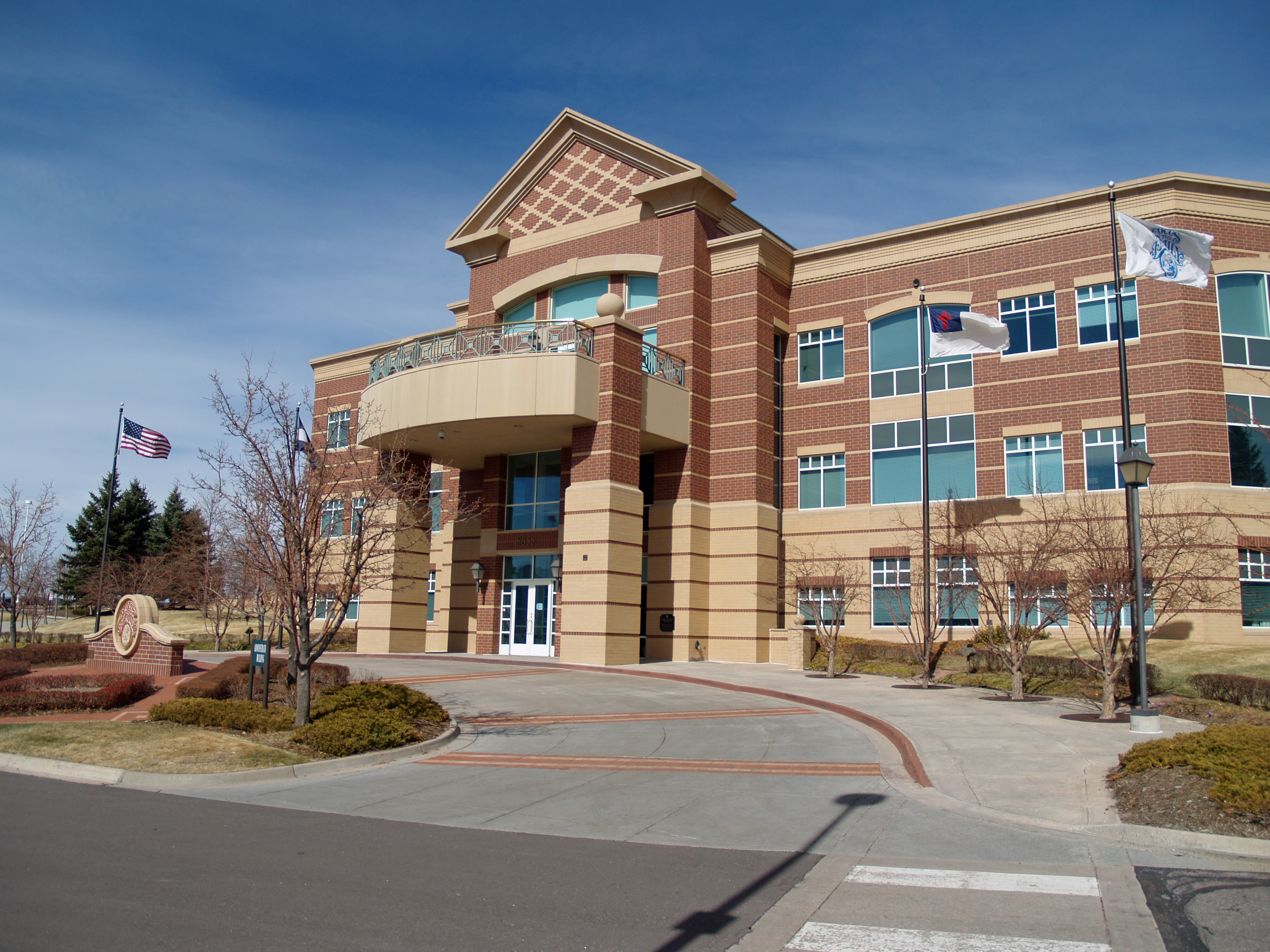
Focus on the Family headquarters in Colorado Springs, which is also headquarters of Family Policy Alliance

The alliance of lobbying groups that FPA currently coordinates was built by James Dobson, a Southern California psychologist and evangelical Christian radio broadcaster, beginning in the 1980s. Dobson is the founder of Focus on the Family, which described the alliance-building as a "behind-the-scenes" program to affect legislation and culture without appearing to be coordinated. According to The United Methodist Reporter members were urged to keep the existence of the alliance a secret so that they would appear to be diversity of different groups, rather than a coordinated effort. The members of this alliance became known as Family Policy Councils.

In the 1980s and 1990s, Focus on the Family and its state-level Family Policy Councils were associated with highly visible culture wars, including strong opposition to legal abortion and same-sex marriage. The alliance was unable to maintain its secrecy and became more widely known in the 1990s. The organization Family Policy Alliance has operated since 2004, coordinating the state Family Policy Council organizations. It shares Focus on the Family's Colorado Springs headquarters building.

=== Partnership with Women's Liberation Front ===
In 2017, FPA filed an amicus brief jointly with Women's Liberation Front, a trans-exclusionary radical feminist organization, to the US Supreme Court. The brief, in opposition to a lower court ruling for a transgender student, stated "pro-family Christians and radical feminists may not agree about much, but they agree that redefining "sex" to mean "gender identity" is a truly fundamental shift in American law and society." The head of FPA Kansas called this partnership "co-belligerence with strange bedfellows."

=== Georgia elections ===
At the time of the Trump–Raffensperger phone call, FPA of Georgia sent a fundraising email in support of Trump's attempts to overturn the results of the US presidential election. The group's executive director, Cole Muzio, expressed concern that Georgia has become more liberal and that the church in Georgia has become weaker. Muzio says that these demographic trends are a form of "cheating" in elections, requiring FPA to respond by advocating for election laws favoring conservative Christians.

Journalist Sarah Posner considers this action by FPA to be part of a larger trend in which the American Christian right embraces voter suppression techniques.

=== Project 2025 ===
FPA is a member of the advisory board of Project 2025, a collection of conservative and right-wing policy proposals from the Heritage Foundation to reshape the United States federal government and consolidate executive power should the Republican nominee win the 2024 presidential election.

=== UDRP dispute ===
In 2024, the Family Policy Foundation filed a Uniform Domain-Name Dispute-Resolution Policy (UDRP) complaint against a website which criticized it as "a fake charitable organization with a mission to keep gay people at an inferior legal status." The World Intellectual Property Organization denied the attempt to seize the critical website on the grounds that the organization uses a "confusing" mixture of names (Family Policy Foundation, Family Policy Alliance, and Family Policy Alliance Foundation, all of which are difficult to distinguish from The Family Foundation) which do not establish strong trademark protections.

== Criticism ==
According to its website, critics of Family Policy Alliance refer to it as a hate group.

Elisa Rae Shupe, a former supporter of FPA and speaker at their Statesmen Academy, says that the goal of FPA is "to inflict maximum harm" on transgender people. Shupe regrets providing training to lawmakers on how cause harm. She feels that the FPA exploited her mental illness when they recruited her as a speaker.

== State allies ==
Family Policy Alliance oversees a network (an "alliance") of 41 state organizations called family policy councils. Together, the alliance employs more than 350 people and takes in revenue of more than $50 million annually as of 2024. Family Policy Alliance writes policy which it disseminates to the state and local level through this network. Its members include:

- Alabama Policy Institute
- Center for Arizona Policy
- Citizens for Community Values in Ohio
- Colorado Family Action
- Cornerstone Policy Research in New Hampshire
- Family Policy Alliance of Kansas
- Frontline Policy Council, formerly FPA of Georgia
- Idaho Family Policy Center
- Indiana Family Institute
- Louisiana Family Forum
- Minnesota Family Council
- Nebraska Family Alliance
- New Yorker's Family Research Foundation
- Texas Values, the lobbying arm of First Liberty Institute
- The Family Leader in Iowa
- Wisconsin Family Council

== See also ==
- Christian right
