= Stephen Imbarrato =

American Catholic priest, Anti-abortion activist

The Reverend Stephen Imbarrato
- Founder, Protest Childkilling
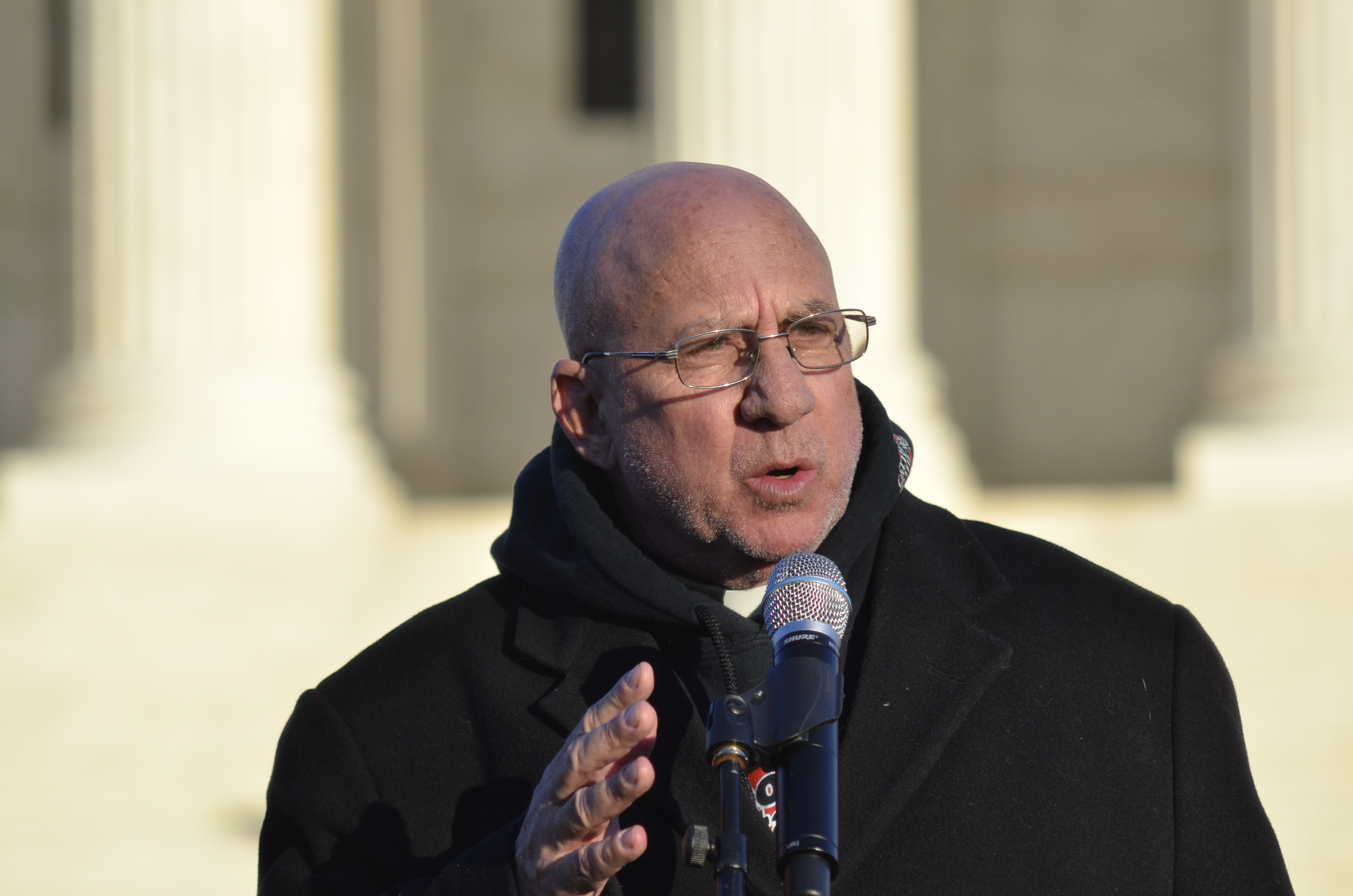
- Father Stephen Imbarrato campaigning outside the Supreme Court
- Other post: Catholic priest (2005–present)

Orders
- Ordination: 2005 by Michael Sheehan (archbishop of Santa Fe)

Personal details
- Born: Stephen Imbarrato; March 19, 1952 (age 74) NYC
- Occupation: Anti-abortion activist
- Education: Holy Apostles College and Seminary (MTheol); Fairleigh Dickinson University (MBA)

Stephen Imbarrato, known as the "Protest Priest", is an American anti-abortion activist and a retired Catholic priest of Archdiocese of Santa Fe. Imbarrato is a former pastoral consultant to Priests for Life.

== Activism ==
Imbarrato is the founder of Protest Childkilling and founding members of "Red Rose Rescue." He provided commentary online during the Frank Pavone laicization controversy.

In 2017, Imbarrato received a suspended fine of $500 to avoid jail time for an abortion protest in Alexandria, Virginia. In 2018, he was arrested for trespass inside Planned Parenthood with an anti-abortion protest.

== Controversies ==
=== Sexism allegations ===
On October 28, 2018, Imbarrato and the Archdiocese of Santa Fe faced a human rights and sexism lawsuit from plaintiff Patricia Garcia, a former employee of the Our Lady of Sorrows Parish in Bernalillo, New Mexico.

=== Pavone controversy ===
On February 10, 2023, Imbarrato, a former Priests for Life consultant, told the laicized Catholic priest, Frank Pavone, to step down as National Director of Priests for Life due to sexual misconduct allegations.

=== Exorcism ===
On June 14, 2019, Imbarrato prayed a minor exorcism rite on an abortion clinic, attempting to rid of the clinic of “demonic oppression”.
