= Stone Ridge =

Stone Ridge may mean:

- Stone Ridge, New York
- Stone Ridge, Virginia
- Stone Ridge (Antarctica)

== See also ==
- Stone Ridge School of the Sacred Heart, Bethesda, Maryland
- Stoneridge Investment Partners v. Scientific-Atlanta
- Stoneridge Shopping Center, Pleasanton, California
- The Stoneridge Group
