= Theodore Shulman =

American abortion-rights activist (born 1961)

- Born: 1961
- Died: April 2026 (aged 64–65)
- Other name: "OperationCounterstrike"
- Occupations: Activist, Singer
- Criminal charge: Interstate threats
- Criminal penalty: 41 months' federal imprisonment, 3 years of supervised release
- Parent(s): Alix Kates Shulman, Martin Shulman
- Target(s): Robert P. George, Frank Pavone
- Imprisoned at: Metropolitan Correctional Center
- Website: operationcounterstrike.blogspot.com

Theodore Shulman (1961 – April 2026) was an American abortion-rights activist who threatened anti-abortion activists with violence. He proclaimed himself the "first pro-choice terrorist". He died of brain cancer in April 2026.

He had performed chorus roles with the Brooklyn Repertory Opera including Orfeo ed Euridice and Un ballo in maschera in 2009 and the Bronx Opera's 2009 production of The Magic Flute and their 2018 production of Rigoletto. He had a YouTube channel dedicated to his favorite opera performances and included a few of his own.

== Threats and arrest ==
Shulman had threatened many prominent leaders of the United States anti-abortion movement with physical harm or death, including: Princeton University professor Robert P. George; the National Director of Priests for Life, Fr. Frank Pavone; Operation Rescue advisor, Cheryl Sullenger; and anti-abortion activists Jill Stanek and Gerard Nadal. Shulman made his threats over the phone and Internet throughout the 2000s and early 2010s. In the incidents that led to his arrest and indictment, Shulman made threats in 2009, 2010 and 2011 in a voicemail, in the comments section of the website of the ecumenical and philosophical journal First Things, on the website "PriestsForLife.org" and on the blog "RealChoice." Shulman never explicitly said that he would kill the targets—although he sometimes came very close.

Shulman's threats led to an investigation by the FBI, the New York Police Department Joint Terrorism Task Force, and the United States Department of Justice. Shulman was in the possession of the toxins cyanide, castor beans and rosary peas at the time of his arrest by the FBI in February 2011.

== Conviction ==
Shulman was indicted on six criminal counts in connection with his threats against George and Pavone. As part of a plea bargain, Shulman pleaded guilty to one count of transmitting a threat to injure another person, in that he wrote on the First Things website, "If Roeder is acquitted [of killing Wichita abortion doctor George Tiller], someone will respond by killing [George] of [Princeton University] and [Pavone] of PRIESTS FOR LIFE."

Shulman was sentenced by Federal Judge Paul A. Crotty to 41 months' imprisonment and 3 years' supervised release. As part of the plea deal, Shulman's sentence was at the low end of the sentencing guidelines, and he did not face weapons charges for possession of the cyanide, castor beans and rosary peas.

He was released from prison in October 2014.
