= Rachel's Vineyard =

American anti-abortion religious organization

Rachel's Vineyard is an American organization offering weekend retreats for women who have had abortions and for others, including men, who believe that they have been hurt by abortion. It is named after Rachel in the Bible, who weeps "for her lost children".

Rachel's Vineyard is funded by Priests for Life and has a broadly Roman Catholic ethos with a Catholic Mass celebrated as an integral part of the retreat, but also runs non-denominational retreats for non-Catholics.

== History ==
In 1996, Theresa Karminski Burke started one of the first therapeutic support groups for women who had had abortions. Later, she founded Rachel’s Vineyard, together with her husband, Kevin Burke. Burke's Rachel's Vineyard: A Psychological and Spiritual Journey for Post Abortion Healing (written with Barbara Cullen) was published in 1994 as a support group model for counselors helping women with post abortion grief. Four Rachel's Vineyard retreats were conducted in 1995 and by the end of 2002 over 130 had been held. In 2003, Rachel’s Vineyard was reorganised and became a ministry of Priests for Life, with Frank Pavone as the Pastoral Director. A retreat is generally designed for about a dozen clients and a priest and a licensed therapist are typically present.

In June 2002, Burke and David Reardon published a book titled Forbidden Grief, a review of Burke's experience in counseling women for abortion-related emotional problems.

In 2003, Bernadette Goulding founded the Irish chapter of Rachel's Vineyard, and in 2011 founded Women Hurt, a similar organisation, with less focus on Catholicism.

As of 2014, Rachel's Vineyard held over 1,000 retreats annually, in 48 U.S. states and 70 countries.

Rachel's Vineyard retreats are hosted by church based ministries, counseling outreach programs, Project Rachel offices, Respect Life groups, and crisis pregnancy centers. They are offered in both Catholic and interdenominational settings.

== See also ==
- Women Hurt, an Irish organisation with similar goals, co-founded by the founder of the Irish chapter of Rachel's Vineyard, but with less focus on Catholicism
