= Family Policy Alliance of Kansas =

Conservative Christian political group

- Headquarters: 4021 SW 10th Street, Suite 311, Topeka, Kansas
- Key people: Brittany Jones, Director of Advocacy
- Website: familypolicyalliance.com/kansas/

Family Policy Alliance of Kansas is a conservative Christian lobbying group and the state affiliate of Family Policy Alliance in Kansas. The affiliate was previously known as Kansas Family Research Institute.

== Policies ==
President Eric Teetsel named a Kansas bathroom bill — legislation to exclude transgender individuals from restrooms which conform to their gender identity — the organization's "number one policy priority" in 2017. Teetsel provided the Kansas legislature with a resolution to "oppose all efforts to validate a transgender identity."

The organization has also advocated against legal same-sex marriage, and believes that business owners should be allowed to decline service to LGBT customers.

Teetsel describes these policies as "an important way we demonstrate love for our neighbors."
