= Frank Pavone =

American laicized Catholic priest, anti-abortion leader (born 1959)

- National director, Priests for Life
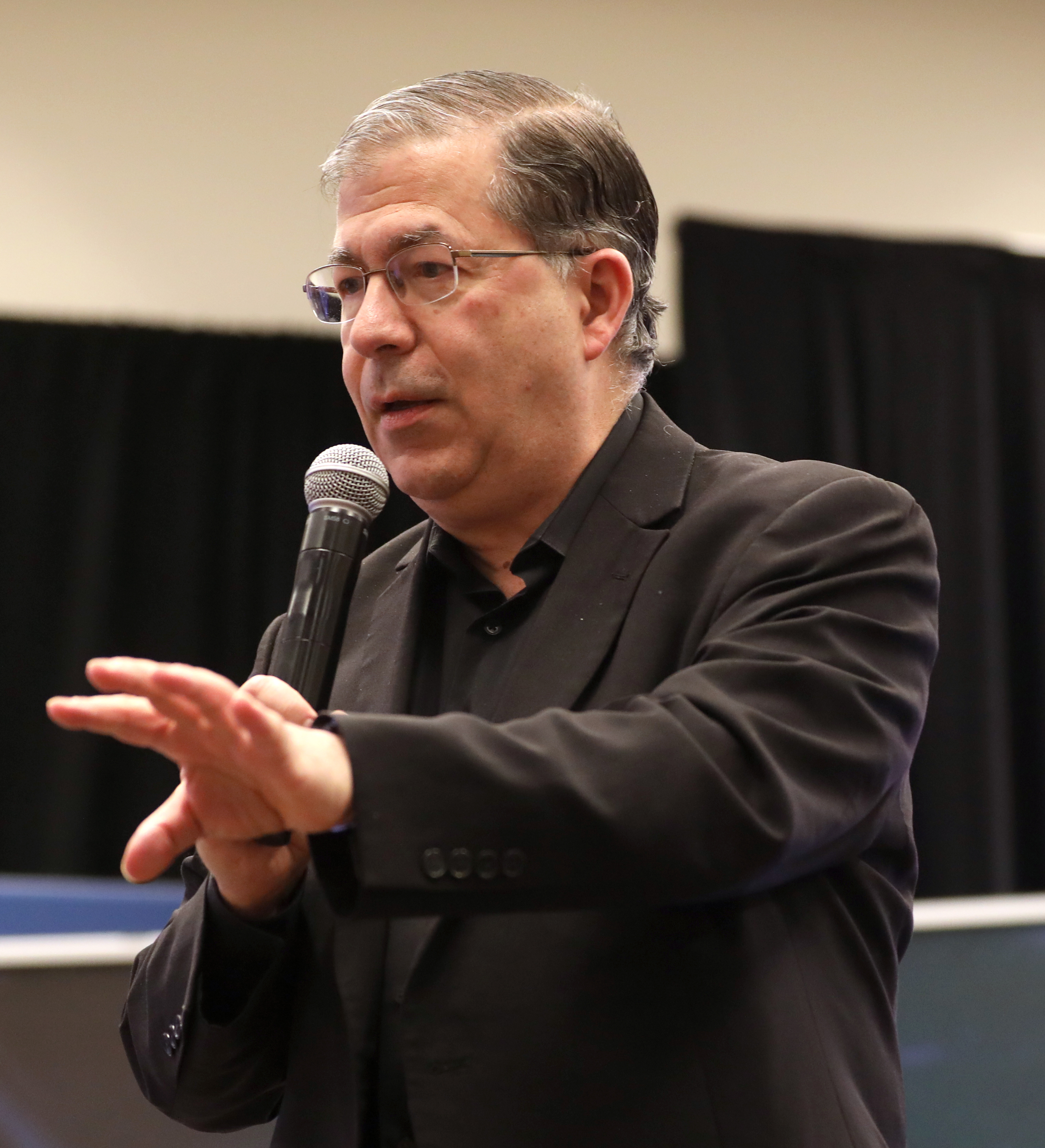
- Pavone speaking at an event
- Other post: Catholic priest (1988–2022)

Orders
- Ordination: November 12, 1988 by Cardinal John O'Connor
- Laicized: November 6, 2022; by Pope Francis

Personal details
- Born: Frank Anthony Pavone; February 4, 1959 (age 67) Port Chester, New York, U.S.
- Occupation: Anti-abortion activist
- Education: Don Bosco College; St. Joseph's Seminary

Frank Anthony Pavone (born February 4, 1959) is an American anti-abortion activist and a laicized Roman Catholic priest. He was the national director of Priests for Life and the chairman and pastoral director of its Rachel's Vineyard project. He is also the president of the National Pro-Life Religious Council, an umbrella group of various anti-abortion Christian denominations, and the pastoral director of the Silent No More campaign.

The Vatican defrocked Pavone for "blasphemous" social media posts and disobedience of his bishop on November 9, 2022. The defrocking mandated that Pavone no longer present himself as a priest.

Pavone's anti-abortion activism was not cited as the reason for his dismissal. However, he had been involved in other controversies, including financial scrutiny of Priests for Life and a 2016 livestream in which he placed an unclothed, aborted fetus onto an altar. In February 2023, Pavone was asked to step down as national director of Priests for Life after allegations were released that he sexually harassed multiple women.

== Early life ==
Pavone was born in 1959 in Port Chester, New York, to Marion and Joseph Pavone. His father was a hardware salesman. Pavone decided to become a priest as a child. He attended the 1976 March for Life, where he became an anti-abortion activist. After graduating as valedictorian of his high school class, he enrolled at Don Bosco College, a Salesian major seminary in Newton, New Jersey, later leaving the Salesian Order and joining the Archdiocese of New York.

== Priesthood ==
Pavone was ordained to the priesthood on November 12, 1988, by Cardinal John O'Connor, then Archbishop of New York, and was assigned to St. Charles Church in Staten Island. During that time, in addition to parish duties, he began producing television broadcasts on local cable TV channels. In 1993, O'Connor appointed him as director of Priests for Life.

In the late 1990s, Pavone served at the Holy See's Pontifical Council for the Family, an office which coordinated pro-life activities for the Catholic Church worldwide and his role included encouraging pro-life leaders to establish local projects.

In 2001, Pavone announced a $12 million advertising campaign designed to welcome women who had had abortions back into the church and worked to combine this work with existing efforts underway through the healing outreach of the National Council of Catholic Bishops. Pavone was also honored at the annual "Proudly Pro-Life" award dinner which was organized by the National Right to Life Committee and hosted at the Waldorf-Astoria hotel in New York.

=== Diocese of Amarillo ===
After a difference in opinion with Cardinal Edward Egan in New York, Pavone sought and received a transfer to the Diocese of Amarillo, Texas. Pavone informed Egan that he wanted to continue to pursue anti-abortion work on a full-time basis and that Bishop John Yanta of Amarillo, Texas, had agreed to support this. The transfer occurred in 2005.

In March 2005, the Diocese of Amarillo announced that Pavone would establish a religious community called Missionaries of the Gospel of Life, a collective of priests and seminarians exclusively dedicated to anti-abortion work. In 2007, Bishop John Yanta, with the approval of the Holy See, suppressed the community. In 2008, the Diocese of Amarillo and Priests for Life issued a statement indicating that the Missionaries of the Gospel of Life would merge with Priests for Life. Pavone indicated that the priestly formation activities of the Missionaries of the Gospel of Life were interfering with his anti-abortion advocacy efforts.

Pavone and Priests for Life announced that on November 11, 2019, by a decree of the Holy See, the Congregation for the Clergy had dismissed Bishop Zurek's restrictions formerly placed upon Pavone and authorized him to transfer from the Diocese of Amarillo and find a bishop who supported his ministry.

In 2022, Pavone was working with a team of canon lawyers on various issues, and seeking incardination in a new, unspecified diocese.

=== Laicization ===
Pavone was dismissed from the clerical state by decree of the Dicastery for the Clergy for "blasphemous communications on social media" and "persistent disobedience of the lawful instructions of his diocesan bishop". The prefect of the Dicastery for the Clergy wrote a letter, dated November 9, 2022, explaining that the decision was not open to appeal. The apostolic nuncio, Christophe Pierre, communicated this decision to the bishops of the United States on December 13, 2022.

A spokeswoman for his team told the National Catholic Register that Pavone had participated in the canonical process that led to his laicization. Pavone continued to celebrate Mass until December 17, and the Priests for Life website called him a priest in good standing. The Schindler family (parents of Terry Schiavo) stated that they stand with Pavone and against his laicization.

When contacted by the Catholic News Agency on December 17, Pavone told the reporter that it was the first he had heard of the decision, although by mid-January 2023, Pavone stated that it was possible he had been sent a notice before the November 9 communication and he "simply did not see it". A few days later, on December 19, Pavone stated that "[t]his idea that any of this is permanent in terms of dismissal from the priesthood is simply incorrect, because we're going to continue", and added that in the future "there will be a next pope, and the next pope can reinstate me".

In 2025, Pavone began to fundraise for an appeal to Pope Leo XIV to be restored to the clerical state.

== Activism ==
Pavone provided much commentary during the Terri Schiavo controversy, having been on the limited visitors' list and at her bedside many times, including during her final hours. He delivered the homily at Schiavo's funeral Mass at the Holy Name of Jesus Catholic Church in Gulfport, Florida, on April 5, 2005.

He was a member of James Dobson's Focus on the Family Institute.

Pavone was threatened with death by Theodore Shulman, an abortion rights advocate. Shulman indicated that Pavone would be killed if Scott Roeder, the murderer of George Tiller (who had been an abortion provider from Wichita, Kansas), was acquitted. Commenting on the threat, Pavone said, "I have already publicly forgiven Mr. Shulman and pray for him every day."

=== Norma McCorvey ===
McCorvey was the lead plaintiff "Jane Roe" in the landmark Roe v. Wade Supreme Court decision that legalized abortion throughout the United States. After Pavone's friend Reverend Flip Benham baptized McCorvey, in 1998 Pavone received her into the Catholic Church, and together they began to collaborate on anti-abortion activities. Pavone was both friend and spiritual mentor to McCorvey in the later years of her life, as she came to regret her involvement in the abortion rights issue in the early 1970s.

=== Terry Schiavo ===
Terry Schiavo was a woman who fell into a coma and whose husband and legal guardian argued with her parents about whether to keep Schiavo on life support. During 1998–2005, there were a series of complex legal cases regarding Schiavo's care, with Schiavo's parents (the Schindlers) arguing that she showed some responsiveness to them and life support via a feeding tube should continue, while Shiavo's husband (Michael Schiavo) argued that she was in a permanent vegetative state without possibility of recovery and that Schiavo herself would not have wanted to be on life support and therefore, her feeding tube should be removed. In 1999, Pavone was placed on the short, court-ordered "approved visitor" list by Schiavo's parents and provided both moral and spiritual support to Schiavo and her parents right up until the time of her death. Pavone's said that during his bedside time with Schiavo that she would respond when he would pray with her, opening her eyes and looking at him, and closing her eyes during the prayer, opening them again upon completion. Pavone was with Schiavo at the time of her death, indicating it was not peaceful, stating that "She was a person who for 13 days had no food or water. She was, as you would expect, very drawn in her appearance as opposed to when I had seen her before. Her eyes were open but they were moving from one side to the next, constantly darting back and forth. I watched her for hours, and the best way I can describe the look on her face is 'terrified sadness'." Pavone delivered the main homily at Schiavo's funeral Mass on April 5, 2005.

=== Joseph Maraachli case ===
In 2011, Pavone was involved in assisting the family of Moe Maraachli, a Canadian man who, with his wife, sought a medical procedure for their dying son, who came to be known as "Baby Joseph", but were refused the treatment in Canada. They turned to Pavone for assistance, and he arranged, through his Priests for Life organization, to have the baby transferred to SSM Cardinal Glennon Children's Medical Center in St. Louis, Missouri, where the child received a tracheotomy, and then to have him flown back home, breathing on his own without a machine. After successfully receiving the procedure in March 2011, "Baby Joseph" Maraachli returned home, where he died in September 2011.

=== Kermit Gosnell ===
In 2013, Pavone presided over a service to give names to the 45 human fetuses found in Kermit Gosnell's Philadelphia abortion clinic. During the service, Pavone asked, "Who are these children, and whose are these children? Are they medical waste or are they our brothers and sisters?" The service also called for prayers and healing for the parents of the aborted babies. Pavone contacted the Philadelphia Medical Examiner to request permission to bury the "Gosnell babies". The request was denied.

=== Supreme Court insurance case ===
Along with his Priests for Life organization and some of its other leaders, Pavone was a petitioner at the US Supreme Court in the case Priests for Life v. Burwell. The case was later consolidated with six other cases in Zubik v. Burwell. These cases challenged an Obama administration mandate from the Department of Health and Human Services that the petitioners said violated their religious freedom by forcing them to be complicit in the process of providing insurance coverage for contraception and certain forms of abortion. These cases successfully relieved Priests for Life and the other petitioners of the mandate.

== Political activity ==
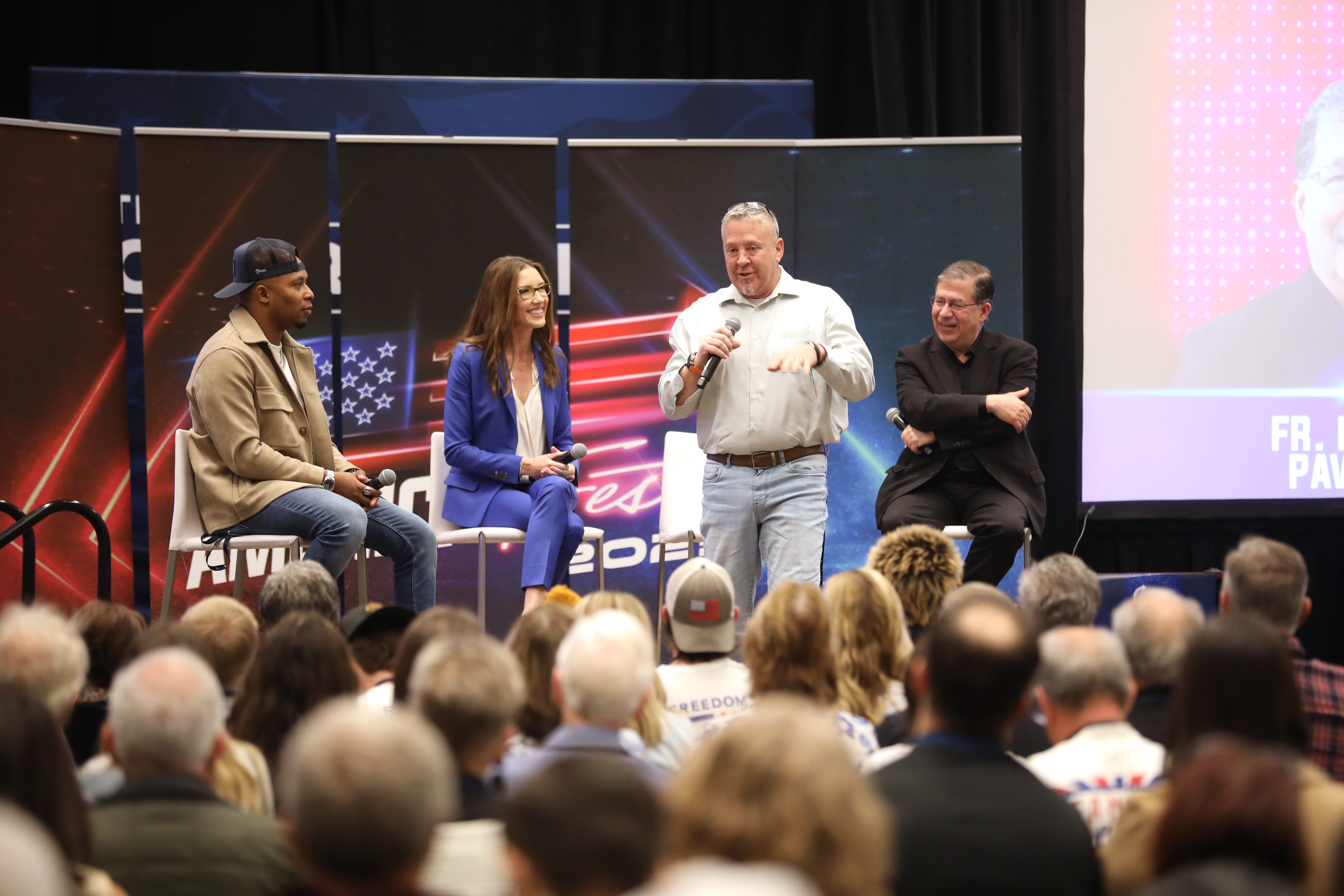
Pavone speaking at a political event in 2023

In September 2004, Pavone addressed a group of delegates to the Republican National Convention in New York. Pavone said that abortion was the "single issue" for him in the election of 2004, and indicated the politics of abortion was the reason he endorsed George W. Bush.

Pavone has made statements comparing supporting the legality of abortion to supporting terrorism. Pavone said "abortion is no less violent than terrorism". When 2008 presidential candidate John McCain chose Sarah Palin as his running mate, Pavone said he believed that Palin was a better Catholic than Democratic vice presidential candidate Joe Biden due to her opposition to abortion, even though Palin is a Protestant.

In January 2010, Pavone commented on the special election victory of Republican Scott Brown to fill the late Democratic Senator Ted Kennedy's U.S. Senate seat. Although Brown has a moderate stance on abortion, supporting certain restrictions while supporting its legality, Pavone considered his victory as an example that "elections are the answer".

In August 2012, after Cardinal Timothy M. Dolan invited President Barack Obama to the annual Al Smith Dinner, Pavone criticized the decision, saying it "amounts to scandal," because Obama supports legal abortion.

Pavone served in leadership positions in former President Donald Trump's 2020 reelection campaign. Pavone served on the Catholic Advisory Board, and was named national co-chair of Pro-Life Voices For Trump. At that time, any concerns about his political and ecclesiastical activity were resolved. When the Holy See's Congregation for the Clergy requested that Pavone refrain from using any formal title within the campaign, both he and the campaign complied with the request although he continued in his role of advising and advocating for the campaign.

== Controversies ==
=== PFL finances ===
In 2011, PFL came under scrutiny for failing to disclose financial details, reporting a $1.4 million deficit in 2010 despite collecting tens of millions of dollars in donations during recent years. On September 6, 2011, Pavone was ordered back to his diocese by his bishop, Patrick Zurek of the Diocese of Amarillo. Zurek limited Pavone to duties within the Diocese of Amarillo because of a protracted disagreement over financial transparency for Pavone's nonprofit Priests for Life and its affiliates – Rachel's Vineyard, which counsels people affected by abortion, and Gospel of Life Ministries, a lay association affiliated with Priests for Life. Pavone remained a priest in good standing, and the bishop did not allege fiscal impropriety. In addition to suspending Pavone from ministry outside Amarillo, Bishop Zurek prohibited Pavone from appearing on the Eternal Word Television Network. Zurek also questioned the management of Priests for Life affiliates Rachel's Vineyard and Gospel of Life Ministries, the latter of which lost its tax-exempt status in 2010, according to IRS records.

A Catholic World News analysis of tax returns indicated that between 2006 and 2008, Priests for Life spent less than 63% of its revenues on its programs, finding that program expenses along with salaries and management costs made up the 37% of expenses and that only one employee had a salary exceeding $100,000. The analysis also found that Pavone did not draw any salary from the organization. Charity Navigator awarded Priests for Life three stars out of four, (an overall score of 82%) with a score of 77.62 for financial accountability and 90.00 for transparency. This score is calculated from multiple beacon scores weighted as follows: 90% for Accountability and Finance and 10% for Leadership and Adaptability. Charity Navigator also indicates that 75% of the revenue is spent on programs and 9% on fundraising. Charity Navigator also indicates that 75.9% of the revenue is spent on programs, and 9.3% on fundraising. The Leadership and Adaptability Report for the organization shows a 100% score.

In September 2011, Pavone appealed to the Holy See to review Bishop Zurek's decision that suspended Pavone's ministry outside the Diocese of Amarillo. Bishop Zurek's initial use of the term "suspended", which under canon law indicates a loss of the authority to perform religious ministry, was not supported by the Congregation of the Clergy, which at the same time affirmed a bishop's right to assign clerics incardinated in his diocese. The Holy See's decree allowed Pavone to minister outside the Diocese of Amarillo; however, he still must obtain specific permission to do so from Amarillo's bishop. Pavone was to continue as chaplain to the Disciples of the Lord Jesus Christ religious order, as assigned by the bishop.

In November 2012, the Congregation decided that since the principal office of Priests for Life was in the Archdiocese of New York, the Archbishop of New York was the competent authority to exercise vigilance over the association. Pavone subsequently complied with demands to straighten out the group's finances and returned to New York to become accountable to his home diocese.

In November 2014, Cardinal Timothy Dolan, Archbishop of New York, and former president of the United States Conference of Catholic Bishops, wrote to the bishops of the United States to advise them that the Congregation of the Clergy had conducted an apostolic visitation of PFL the previous year, and had subsequently requested that he "assist Father Pavone with several necessary reforms." Cardinal Dolan wrote to advise the bishops that Pavone had not cooperated with the reforms. As a result, the cardinal told the Holy See that "I am unable to fulfill their mandate, and want nothing further to do with the organization."

=== Pre-election videos ===
On November 7, 2016, Pavone, a member of Donald Trump's 33-member Catholic advisory council, presented a live video in which he appeared with what he claimed was the body of an unclothed aborted fetus and placed it on a table. Pavone preached for about 45 minutes on the subject of abortion and urged his supporters to vote for Trump. While Pavone garnered support from some quarters, negative reactions were widespread, and many observers believed that the table was a consecrated church altar. Ed Mechmann, director of public policy for the Archdiocese of New York, said that "A human being has been sacrificed and the altar of God has been desecrated, all for politics. Everyone who respects the dignity of every human person should reject and disavow this atrocity." Bishop Patrick Zurek of the Amarillo, Texas diocese, said the video was "... against the dignity of human life and is a desecration of the altar," and "is not consistent with the beliefs of the Catholic Church. We believe that no one who is pro-life can exploit a human body for any reason, especially the body of a fetus." The bishop stated that Priests for Life, which was then based in Staten Island, N.Y., was not a Catholic, but a civil institution and therefore not under the diocese's supervision. He added that the diocese was opening an investigation of Pavone "about all these matters." In a follow-up statement, Pavone indicated that the table used in the video was an ordinary table in his office and not a consecrated altar.

=== Sexual misconduct allegations ===
In February 2023, Pavone was asked to step down as national director of Priests for Life after allegations were released that he sexually harassed multiple women. The allegations go back decades. Pavone has denied those allegations while also saying he may have "unintentionally made someone feel uncomfortable."
