= Women Hurt =

Irish anti-abortion organisation

- Founded: 2011; 15 years ago
- Type: Support group; Anti-abortion lobby group
- Location: the Republic of Ireland
- Key people: Bernadette Goulding; Lynn Coles; Edel Best
- Website: WomenHurt.ie

Women Hurt is an Irish anti-abortion organisation for women who regret having an abortion. They campaign against change in the state's abortion law. They have appeared on TV debates about abortion, and participated in anti-abortion protests.

Women Hurt was founded in 2011 (Note: An earlier body called "Women Hurt By Abortion" was launched in 1988 by Brian McKevitt, a Catholic priest who later edited Alive!. It opposed the 1992 abortion referendums and was part of Family Solidarity.) by Bernadette Goulding and Lynn Coles, both of whom regretted their abortions. Goulding in 2003 had founded an Irish chapter of Rachel's Vineyard, a similar organisation with a Catholic perspective. Coles had worked with a group called Surrendering the Secret, described as "an abortion recovery Bible study rooted in the Gospel".

In 2013, during the debate about Protection of Life During Pregnancy Act 2013, representatives spoke at the National Vigil for Life organised by the Pro Life Campaign, and they participated in the 2014 Vigil.

In 2017, Women Hurt was one of 17 groups selected to present to the Citizens' Assembly during its review of the Eighth Amendment of the Constitution, which underpins Irish abortion law. Women Hurt was represented by Anthony Levatino, a Doctor from the US, which drew criticism for being a male doctor talking about abortion rather than a personal story from a woman who regretted her abortion.

== See also ==
- Abortion in the Republic of Ireland
- Abortion and mental health
- Rachel's Vineyard
