= Family Policy Council =

A Family Policy Council (FPC) is one of several US state-level organizations affiliated with Focus on the Family (FotF), a nationwide conservative Christian organization. Family Policy Councils work for policies described as "pro-family". These include support for traditional marriage, abstinence-only sex education, increased legal restrictions on abortion and opposition to same-sex marriage, LGBT adoption, and LGBT workplace protections. FPCs also work to shape public opinion, organize political demonstrations, and cultivate future politicians.

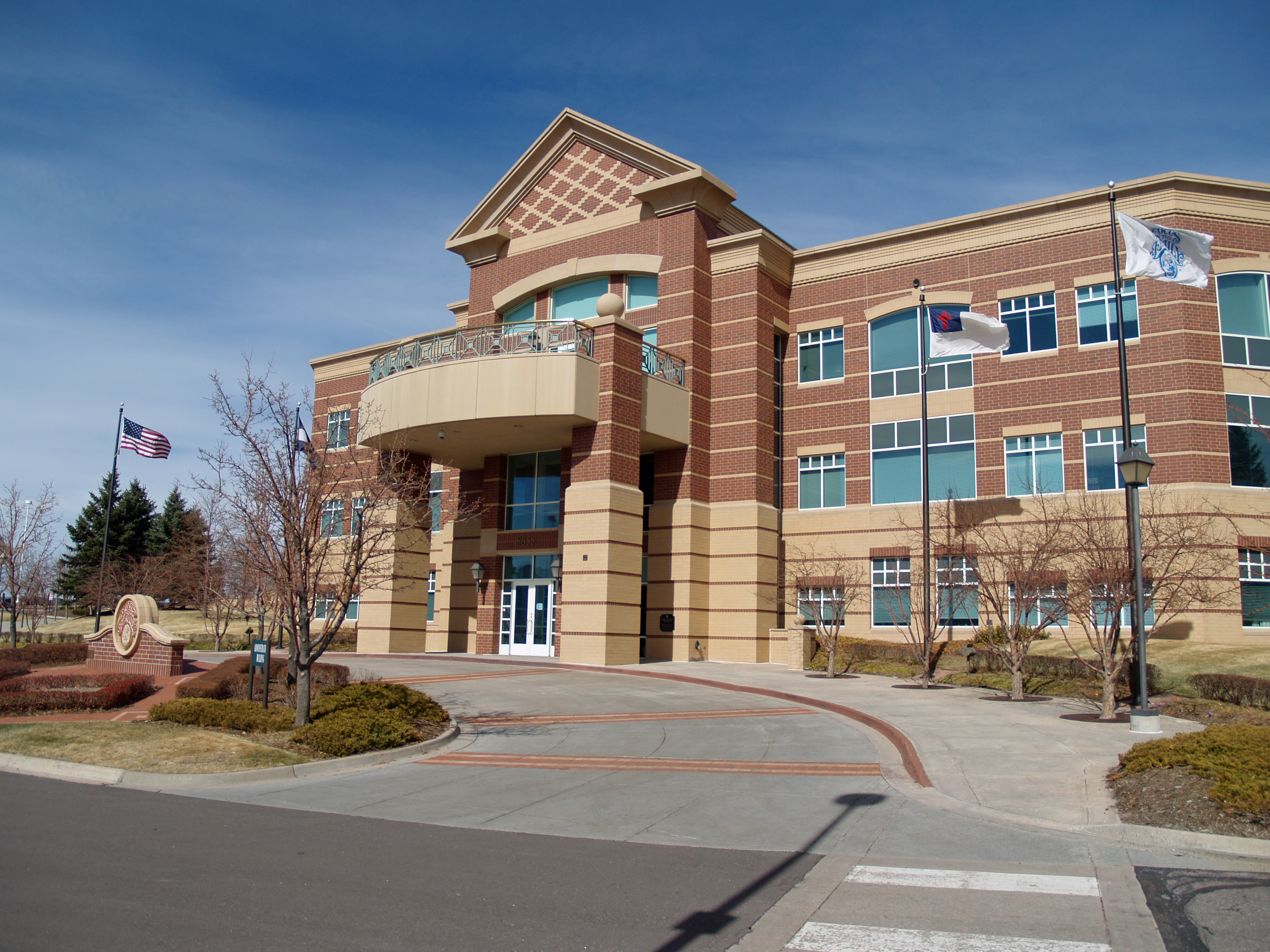
Focus on the Family administration building, Colorado Springs

FPCs form a network or "alliance" through which FotF exerts influence on local and state-level policy. They are joined via the organization Family Policy Alliance, which writes conservative policy that the family policy councils lobby for at the state and local level. This network of 41 member organizations, as of 2024, employs more than 350 people and brings in more than $50 million in annual revenue.

This alliance began to be assembled in secret in the late 1980s, and became openly known in the 1990s. Some of the alliance member organizations are older than the alliance itself; the oldest dates to 1897. The existence of Focus on the Family's affiliated FPCs has spurred the development of other, sometimes opposing policy organizations. An example is OutNebraska, a "statewide LGBTQ advocacy organization" that works against policy goals of Nebraska Family Alliance, an FPC. Before the alliance operated by Focus on the Family was publicly known, a few other organizations also used the name "Family Policy Council" in a generic sense. They were not affiliated with FotF and are now defunct.

The Southern Poverty Law Center has described FotF as a fringe and anti-LGBT organization that relies on misrepresenting scientific studies.

== Origins ==
Family Policy Councils are loosely based on the FotF-affiliated lobbying group Family Research Council, which states: "Family Policy Councils (FPCs) accomplish at the state level what Family Research Council does at the national level - shape public debate and formulate public policy."

=== Secret origins ===
Focus on the Family (FotF) states that the first Family Policy Council opened in 1988. However, some FPCs are older than this because they were pre-existing organizations that later joined the alliance.

The early history of FPCs was kept "behind the scenes" by FotF. Michael Jameson, a FotF representative, spoke about FotF's nascent effort to create "pro-family" organizations in US states to "affect legislation and to affect our culture" at 1989 Denver meeting of conservative policy groups. The United Methodist Reporter wrote that while FotF "is helping pro-family groups create coalitions, at the same time it is urging them to keep secret their participation in the coalition and even that a coalition exists." Jameson explained that "the coalitions can be more effective with a low profile and by leaving their public identity to the groups comprising the coalitions."

Among the first of these organizations to openly name itself "Family Policy Council" is North Carolina Family Policy Council, founded in 1992.

=== Reshaped organizations ===
Religion journalist Frederick Clarkson has stated that FotF "often has selected and reshaped an existing state-level organization rather than create a Family Policy Council from scratch." Below are examples of organizations that were taken under the FotF umbrella:

- The Christian Civic League of Maine was founded in 1897 to support the prohibition of alcohol. Nearly a century after it was founded it refocused from prohibition to matters of sexual morality and became a FotF affiliate.
- Citizens for Community Values was a Cincinnati anti-pornography organization founded in 1983 before becoming the official Family Policy Council for Ohio in 1991.
- The Wisconsin Family Council was founded as Family Research Institute of Wisconsin to advocate for corporal punishment in religious schools in 1986.
- The Minnesota Family Council was previously known as The Berean League, "a publisher of anti-gay literature."

=== Unaffiliated organizations sharing the term ===
The term "Family Policy Council" has also historically referred to government entities on a couple of occasions; these are not related to FotF. A Washington state coalition of state agencies named Family Policy Council operated from 1992 to 2012. A proposed Delaware government entity was also named Family Policy Council in 1993.

An organization named "Family Policy Council" was active in Richmond, Virginia 1989. It was formed to oppose sex education. Its affiliation with FotF is unclear.

== Operations ==
Family Policy Councils sometimes divide their operations into legal entities with differing tax status. For example, Colorado Family Action is a 501(c)(4) organization, which can legally do more government lobbying than its sibling Colorado Family Action Foundation, a 501(c)(3) organization dedicated to shaping culture.

As of 2024 there are 41 family policy councils. In total, this network of state organizations employs more than 350 people and receives more than $50 million in annual revenue as of 2024.

FPCs' work is socially conservative. FPCs sometimes coordinate their work with, and exchange staff with, a network of fiscal conservative organizations called State Policy Network (SPN). A few organizations are both FPC and SPN members, for example, Alabama Policy Institute.

== Impact ==
Family Policy Councils advocated for state bans on same-sex marriage in the 1990s and 2000s, many of which passed into law. A University of Arizona statistical study of the bans concluded that the "measure of Family Policy Council strength in a state increases the probability of adopting a same-sex marriage ban."

An example is Ohio's gay marriage ban, spearheaded by the Ohio FPC in 2004. A lawsuit against the Ohio ban lead to Obergefell v. Hodges, the US Supreme Court decision that legalized gay marriage nationwide in 2015.

== Listing of organizations ==
=== Focus on the Family affiliates ===
The following organizations have an official connection to Focus on the Family and its state government lobbying arm, Family Policy Alliance. This is not a complete list.

- Alabama Policy Institute
- Center for Arizona Policy
- Nebraska Family Alliance
- Indiana Family Institute
- The Family Leader in Iowa
- Family Foundation of Virginia
- Colorado Family Action
- Citizens for Community Values in Ohio
- Christian Civic League of Maine
- Cornerstone Policy Research in New Hampshire
- Missouri Family Policy Council
- Family Institute of Connecticut
- Louisiana Family Forum
- Palmetto Family Council
- Minnesota Family Council

=== Similar organizations ===
The following organizations also lobby for policy and encourage cultural change in connection with families. They are not affiliated with Focus on the Family, and may have differing and in some cases opposed policy goals.

- Australian Family Association
- Campaign for Children and Families
- Love Makes a Family

== See also ==
- Alliance Defense Fund
- American Family Association
- Family Research Council
- Family Research Institute
