= Michael J. Norton =

American lawyer

United States Attorney for the District of Colorado
- In office 1988–1993
- President: Ronald Reagan; George H. W. Bush
- Preceded by: Robert N. Miller
- Succeeded by: Henry Lawrence Solano

Personal details
- Spouse: Jane Norton
- Education: American University (J.D.), Denver Seminary (M.Div.)

Michael J. Norton is an American attorney who was United States Attorney for the District of Colorado from 1988 to 1993, and who serves as council for conservative lobbying groups.

== Education ==
Norton received his J.D. in 1968 from American University. In 2009, Norton earned a Masters of Divinity (M.Div.) degree from Denver Seminary.

== Biography ==
Norton was nominated as attorney for the District of Colorado on March 24, 1988. As US Attorney, Norton oversaw expanded prosecution of cocaine and crack cocaine infractions during the crack epidemic.

Norton is counsel at Thomas N. Scheffel & Associates P.C. in Denver, and previously at Alliance Defending Freedom (ADF). Until 2015, he focused on law connected with opposition to legal abortion and opposition to birth control. Norton also currently serves on the board of directors of Colorado Family Action, a Christian fundamentalist lobbying organization.

Norton is married to Jane Norton, Colorado Lieutenant Governor from 2003 to 2007. Together, Michael and Jane Norton drafted Colorado Amendment 43. This amendment prohibited gay marriage in Colorado.

== Cases ==
Michael Norton represented Jack Phillips, a baker whose religious beliefs lead him to decline to make a wedding cake for a gay couple in 2012, at an early stage in Phillips's case. The case Masterpiece Cakeshop v. Colorado Civil Rights Commission would go before the US Supreme Court.
