= Women Exploited By Abortion =

United States organization

Women Exploited By Abortion (WEBA) was a United States anti-abortion organization founded by Nancy Jo Mann in 1982 for women who regretted having an abortion. In 1985, David Reardon surveyed 250 women from this organization and wrongly concluded that abortion caused mental health issues.
