= 2006 Colorado Referendum I =

Referendum I
- November 7, 2006
- Colorado Domestic Partnership Benefits and Responsibilities Act

Results
Choice	Votes	%
Yes	734,385	47.65%
No	806,717	52.35%
County results
For
70–80%
60–70%
50–60%
Against
80–90%
70–80%
60–70%
50–60%

Colorado Referendum I was a proposed law that would have established domestic partnerships in the U.S. state of Colorado. The bill was passed by the Colorado General Assembly and was submitted to popular referendum during general elections on November 7, 2006.

The voters were presented with the following summary:

Upon voter approval, Referendum I establishes legal domestic partnerships in the state of Colorado. Additionally, it specifies eligibility requirements, definitions, procedures, rights, responsibilities, and means for terminating domestic partnerships.

and the following detail:

BALLOT TITLE: Shall there be an amendment to the Colorado revised statutes to authorize domestic partnerships, and, in connection therewith, enacting the "Colorado Domestic Partnership Benefits and Responsibilities Act" to extend to same-sex couples in a domestic partnership the benefits, protections, and responsibilities that are granted by Colorado law to spouses, providing the conditions under which a license for a domestic partnership may be issued and the criteria under which a domestic partnership may be dissolved, making provisions for implementation of the act, and providing that a domestic partnership is not a marriage, which consists of the union of one man and one woman?

The referendum specified that a partnership is not a marriage, which "consists of the union of one man and one woman."

In the general election, the proposal was defeated by a margin of 47% for, 53% against.

== See also ==
- Domestic partnership in the United States
- List of Colorado ballot measures
- Colorado Amendment 43 (2006)
