= Covenant marriage =

Type of marriage in the U.S.

Covenant marriage is a legally distinct kind of marriage in three states of the United States (Arizona, Arkansas, and Louisiana), in which the marrying spouses agree to obtain pre-marital counseling and accept more limited grounds for later seeking divorce (the least strict of which being that the couple lives apart from each other for two years). Louisiana became the first state to pass a covenant marriage law in 1997; shortly afterwards, Arkansas and Arizona followed suit.

== Procedure ==
Prior to entering into a covenant marriage, a couple must attend premarital counseling sessions "emphasizing the nature, purposes, and responsibilities of marriage" and must sign a statement declaring "that a covenant marriage is for life." In contrast to more lenient no-fault divorce requirements for non-covenant marriages, a spouse in a covenant marriage desiring a divorce may first be required to attend marital counseling. A spouse desiring a divorce must also prove that one of the following is true:

- The other spouse has committed adultery.
- The other spouse has committed a felony.
- The other spouse engages in substance abuse.
- The other spouse has physically or sexually abused the spouse or a child.
- The spouses have been living separately for a minimum amount of time specified by law (one or two years, depending on the law of the state).

Couples married without a covenant marriage may also accept the obligations of a covenant marriage at a later date.

== Intent and acceptance ==
According to proponents of covenant marriage, the movement sets out to promote and strengthen marriages, reduce the rate of divorce, decrease the number of children born out of wedlock, discourage cohabitation, and frame marriage as an honorable and desirable institution.

Despite the goals of covenant marriage proponents, in the three states with covenant marriage statutes, only an extremely small minority of newlyweds chose covenant marriage. In Louisiana, between 2000 and 2010, only about 1 percent of marrying couples chose a covenant marriage, with the other 99 percent choosing to marry under standard marriage laws permitting no-fault divorce. In Arizona, estimates of the rate of covenant marriage among new couples range from 0.25 percent to 1 percent. In Arkansas, a similarly very small number of couples choose covenant marriage.

== Out of state divorce ==
A number of legal analyses suggest that states are likely to apply local state divorce law when a resident seeks a divorce, or when both members of a marriage agree to seek a divorce. This potentially renders covenant marriage's divorce restrictions ineffective if one individual establishes residency in a state without a covenant marriage law, or if both individuals go to such a state for an uncontested divorce.

== Religious issues ==
Critics of covenant marriage have described it "as an example of religion harnessing state power" and creating roadblocks to no-fault divorce that "could easily exacerbate" a bad family "situation and harm kids." According to these critics, "[w]aiting periods and mandatory classes 'add a new frustration to already frustrated lives'" and are merely "a form of paternalism – expanding government in pursuit of socially conservative ends."

Though covenant marriage law is written neutrally with respect to religion, many view it as state permission for a religious form of marriage, particularly due to its historical background. Katherine Spaht, a founder of the Louisiana Family Forum and a proponent of Louisiana's covenant marriage law, stated that one "less obvious objective" is "inviting religion back 'into the public square'" to "revitalize and reinvigorate the 'community' known as the church". This can be inferred, she said, from the rule about "who may perform the mandatory premarital counseling", namely, "a minister, priest, rabbi, or other clergyman of a religious sect". Tony Perkins, a sponsor of the Louisiana Covenant Marriage Bill and another founder of the Louisiana Family Forum, described covenant marriage as fostering an environment for "traditional family values" that are "up to the faith community."

== Notable covenant marriages ==
- Mike Johnson, 56th Speaker of the United States House of Representatives, and his wife Kelly Lary married in 1999 as a covenant marriage.

== See also ==
- Manus marriage
- Types of marriages
