= Colorado Family Action =

American Christian fundamentalism lobbying organization

- Established: 2007
- Founder: Jim Pfaff
- Dissolved: 2023
- Tax ID no.: 20-5012920 (EIN)
- Key people: Debbie Chaves, Executive Director
- Budget: Revenue: $115,985; Expenses: $70,781 (FYE June 2015)
- Website: www.coloradoaction.org

Colorado Family Action (CFA) was a Christian fundamentalist lobbying organization founded in 2007. It opposed gay marriage or domestic partnership, gay adoption, and adoption by unmarried people. The organization advocated for conversion therapy, the pseudoscientific practice of trying to change sexual orientation. It fought against birth control access and legal marijuana.

CFA was a Family Policy Council, meaning that it was a state-based affiliate of Focus on the Family. The organization was dissolved in 2023.

== Anti-LGBT policy ==
Colorado Family Action director Debbie Chaves stated there is an "LGBTQ agenda driving policy" in Colorado which justifies CFA's support for legal conversion therapy. Chaves opposed sex education for the same reason, supporting instead "a biblical world view of sexuality" without gay people.

In conjunction with Lieutenant Governor Jane Norton, CFA lead the 2006 campaign that outlawed gay marriage in the Colorado Constitution.

== Board of directors ==
The board of directors sets CFA's policy. Notable past and present board members listed by the Colorado Secretary of State include:

- Mike Kopp, Colorado senator
- Michael J. Norton, United States Attorney for Colorado from 1988 to 1993 and husband of former Lieutenant Governor Jane Norton
- Doug Stimple, prominent Colorado builder and developer
- Craig A. Saeman, CDO of Catholic Charities of Denver
- Mark Cowart, COO at Church For All Nations, a Colorado Springs megachurch
- Andy Limes, Principal at SDR Ventures, an investment bank
- Marc Butler, owner of a glass and window business, contractor on Canvas Stadium
