= Tracy Thorne-Begland =

American judge (born 1966)

- Born: Tracy William Thorne; October 3, 1966 (age 59)
- Education: Vanderbilt University (BA); University of Richmond (JD)
- Occupations: prosecutor, judge
- Known for: challenge to Don't Ask Don't Tell, Virginia General District Court appointment
- Spouse: Michael Joseph Thorne-Begland

Tracy William Thorne-Begland (born October 3, 1966) is an American judge, currently serving on the Circuit Court of Richmond, Virginia. He was the first openly gay jurist elected by the Virginia General Assembly.

After graduation from university, Thorne-Begland served in a jet combat squadron of the United States Navy. During the 1992 presidential campaign, he appeared on the television news program Nightline to criticize the Navy's policy of excluding homosexuals, identifying himself as gay, and was honorably discharged from the service. As a result of the appeal processes, Thorne-Begland became interested in the law and graduated from law school.

After serving twelve years as a prosecutor, Thorne-Begland was nominated for an open seat on the General District Court of Richmond in 2012, but the Virginia House of Delegates rejected him for the position for his perceived advocacy on homosexual issues. The Richmond Circuit Court judges granted him a temporary appointment to the post on June 14, 2012. On January 15, 2013, he was confirmed in the position by both houses of the Virginia General Assembly.

== Early life and military career ==
Tracy W. Thorne grew up in a well-off family in West Palm Beach, Florida. Following his graduation from Vanderbilt University, he entered the US Navy in 1988, inspired by reading Stephen Coonts' novel Flight of the Intruder about naval aviators in the Vietnam War. He was first in his flight training class, and served in Attack Squadron 65, the "Fighting Tigers", at Oceana Naval Air Station flying the A-6 Intruder. Initially denying his homosexuality, Thorne accepted it in 1990 when he visited a gay bar for the first time on New Year's Eve.

In 1992, Thorne came out to his squadronmates, who he later stated were supportive: "It was a complete non-issue". In April he spoke with an aide of Colorado congresswoman Pat Schroeder, who encouraged him to go public with his story to build popular support for a bill to overturn the ban on gay service members. Thorne agreed to do so, and completed the process of coming out to family members, including his father and brother. On May 19, 1992, during a presidential campaign in which Democratic candidate Bill Clinton was proposing an end to the military's exclusion of homosexuals, Thorne openly identified as homosexual during an interview with Ted Koppel on the ABC television news program Nightline. Thorne later appeared on NBC's Today Show and CNN's Sonya Live.

Within days, the Navy began discharge proceedings against him, though he was not formally discharged until 1995. By the time of his first discharge hearing in August 1992, Thorne had reached the rank of lieutenant. On May 11, 1993, he testified before the U.S. Senate Armed Services Committee, which was surveying the opinions of service members on the question of service by open homosexuals. He told the senators that his discussion with his peers following his television disclosure was "a nonevent" and called the policy banning service by homosexuals "Government-sanctioned discrimination." During the committee session, South Carolina Senator Strom Thurmond advised Thorne to seek psychiatric help.

In 1994, President Clinton instituted "don't ask, don't tell" (DADT), a policy which barred open homosexuals from military service but forbade officers to investigate the sexuality of service members. Thorne's previous assertion became a test of this new policy, and proceedings against him continued. While Thorne's discharge proceedings were under way, he was awarded the Navy Achievement Medal for "superb leadership, exceptional professionalism and total devotion to duty". In 1994, a Navy board of inquiry recommended that Thorne be honorably discharged, though the discharge was not official until May 6, 1995.

Thorne then brought suit in federal court to overturn the discharge; the court ordered his reinstatement while the case proceeded. After he lost his challenge to DADT in both U.S. District Court and the Fourth Circuit Court of Appeals, the Supreme Court declined to hear his appeal on October 19, 1998, and he was again discharged.

Thorne's various cases left him with a new interest in the law. He pursued a degree at the University of Richmond School of Law, graduating in 1997.

== Judicial nomination ==
Thorne-Begland went on to serve 12 years as a prosecutor and became chief deputy commonwealth's attorney for Richmond. In 2012, he was nominated to fill a vacancy on the state's 13th General District Court, which serves Richmond, Virginia. Before the vote, the conservative advocacy group Family Foundation of Virginia lobbied heavily against his nomination due to his homosexuality and past activism. He had served for a time on the board of Equality Virginia, a gay rights advocacy organization. If his nomination had succeeded, he would have become the first openly gay judge in the state.

On May 14, the day of the scheduled vote on Thorne-Begland's appointment, Republican governor Bob McDonnell stated that the candidate's sexuality should not be an issue: "All I can tell you is what I've always said about judges, and that is that these ought to be merit-based selections solely based on a person's skill, ability, fairness, judicial temperament". Thorne-Begland also attempted to address concerns by pledging to "neutrally apply the laws" and avoid political advocacy.

Some House Republicans were critical of Thorne-Begland's lying to the Navy about his homosexuality, stating that his violation of the military's code of conduct made him unfit for a judgeship. Delegates also stated that they felt Thorne-Begland's homosexuality and previous history of activism would influence his rulings on the bench.

Following a lengthy discussion, the vote on Thorne-Begland's nomination was held shortly after 1 am on May 15. The vote split largely along party lines, with 21 Democrats and 8 Republicans supporting him and 31 Republicans opposing him, well short of the 51-vote majority needed. Following the vote, the House of Delegates adjourned for the year.

=== Responses ===
Thorne-Begland's supporters described the opposition to his appointment as "discrimination" and "bigotry", while his opponents described it as a necessary measure against his "aggressive activist homosexual agenda". Virginia Republican Bob Marshall noted on CNN that "Sodomy is not a civil right", and stated that Thorne-Begland's homosexuality would make it impossible for him to judge cases impartially: "if you have a bar room fight between a homosexual and heterosexual, I'm concerned about possible bias." Republican senate candidate and former senator George Allen expressed disagreement with the vote, stating that judges should be appointed based on judicial qualifications rather than sexual orientation. Stephanie Cutter of US president Barack Obama's re-election campaign described Thorne-Begland as "overly-qualified" for the post, stating "He is a well-known successful prosecutor ... That is how the legislature should be making these decisions. Not based on someone's own sexual orientation." The campaign of Republican presidential nominee Mitt Romney declined to comment.

The New York Times accused the House of "clear and shameful" bias. The Washington Post stated that "no matter how they dressed it up, the Republicans' opposition boiled down to old-fashioned prejudice." Dahlia Lithwick of Slate wrote that if Thorne-Begland's previous advocacy for gay rights disqualified him from the bench, Thurgood Marshall's advocacy with the NAACP and Ruth Bader Ginsburg's advocacy for women's rights would have disqualified them from the U.S. Supreme Court. The New Jersey Star-Ledger described the decision as "stunning in its blatant prejudice."

=== Judgeship ===
Thorne-Begland commented that he was "looking forward to continuing to serve the citizens of the city of Richmond and the great commonwealth of Virginia" in his role as a prosecutor. A month later, on June 14, the Richmond Circuit Court judges appointed him to the position for which he was rejected by the legislature. The temporary appointment began July 1, 2012, to expire 30 days after the date the next legislative session began. Governor McDonnell's spokesman congratulated Thorne-Begland on the appointment, stating, "the Governor believes Mr. Thorne-Begland is well-qualified to serve on the bench". Marshall called the move "highly imprudent and arrogant" of the judges: "They're contesting the authority of the General Assembly. . . . This is an act of defiance on their part. When appointed officials get in fights with elected officials, they invariably lose." Thorne-Begland stated that "I look forward to serving the citizens of the City of Richmond as a jurist, and over the coming months, I hope that my service provides comfort to all Virginians that I remain committed to the faithful application of the laws and Constitutions of Virginia and the United States of America."

On January 15, 2013, the House of Delegates elected Thorne-Begland to a full six-year term with a vote of 66–28, with one abstention. The 28 votes against him were all cast by members of the Republican party. The Senate followed with a vote of 28–0, with 12 Republican senators not voting. Thorne-Begland was the first openly gay jurist elected by the General Assembly. He was sworn in for his full term on March 1, 2013.

On February 22, 2023, the General Assembly elevated Thorne-Begland to an eight-year term as a judge of the Thirteenth Judicial Circuit.

== Personal life ==
Thorne-Begland lives with his husband, originally Michael Begland, a Richmond attorney. They have combined their original surnames, and both use the surname Thorne-Begland. They had a commitment ceremony in 2001 after 8 years together and soon decided they wanted to have children. Using eggs from Michael Thorne-Begland's sister and sperm from Tracy Thorne-Begland, they used a surrogate to give birth to their twins in 2004 in a Maryland hospital.

== See also ==
- List of LGBT jurists in the United States
