= Idaho Family Policy Center =

American nonprofit organization

The Idaho Family Policy Center (IFPC) is a nonprofit policy organization based in Boise, Idaho. The organization advocates for conservative Christian policy positions in the Idaho state government. The IFPC partners with the Family Research Council, Focus on the Family, the Family Policy Alliance, and the Alliance Defending Freedom.

The IFPC advocates for legislative positions including challenging and restricting books in libraries, restricting elective abortion, and mandating Bible readings in public schools.

== History ==
The Idaho Family Policy Center was incorporated in May 2021 by Ron Crane, Ben Toews, Blaine Conzatti, and Kelly Kitchens. The IFPC was formed following the dissolution of two similar groups: the Idaho Family Forum and the Cornerstone Institute of Idaho.

== Leadership and organization ==
The Idaho Family Policy Center is organized as a 501(c)3. The organization is led by its president, Blaine Conzatti, and governed by a volunteer board of directors.

== Policy positions and activities ==
=== Library materials ===
The IFPC co-authored legislation restricting which library materials can be available to minors. House Bill 710, which became law in 2024, allows lawsuits against libraries that make materials available to a minor whose parents had requested their relocation. The IFPC cited concerns about books including Gender Queer: A Memoir and All Boys Aren't Blue.

=== Abortion ===
The IFPC has supported several anti-abortion measures, including Senate Bill 1309 (2022), which allows lawsuits against medical providers for performing abortions after the detection of fetal cardiac activity. The organization also co-authored legislation prohibiting public employees from providing abortion referrals.

=== LGBTQ issues ===
The IFPC has co-authored and supported legislation affecting LGBTQ individuals, including restricting drag performances, prohibiting puberty blockers and cross-sex hormones for minors, allowing lawsuits for students who encounter someone of the opposite biological sex in their bathroom, and shielding public employees from disciplinary actions for deadnaming or misgendering a student.

=== Other legislative positions ===
The IFPC has also supported mandatory minimum sentences for drug offenses, restrictions on non-approved flags and banners in public schools, and mandatory daily Bible readings in public schools.

== Criticism ==
The IFPC has drawn criticism from various commentators and former Idaho officials.

Former Idaho Attorney General Jim Jones has criticized the relationship between the IFPC and the Idaho Legislature, describing them as the "morality police" and arguing that "mixing religion into a regulatory agenda is a recipe for abuse and repression."

Idaho writer Gregory Graf, who identifies as a conservative Christian, has criticized the organization's approach, writing that the IFPC "continues to bully its way into the capital" and questioning their narrow view of Christianity.

Columnist William Brock described the library materials legislation as a "contrived controversy," and "a solution in search of a problem."
