= Jane Norton =

American politician

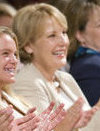

46th Lieutenant Governor of Colorado
- In office January 13, 2003 – January 9, 2007
- Governor: Bill Owens
- Preceded by: Joe Rogers
- Succeeded by: Barbara O'Brien

46th Chair of the National Lieutenant Governors Association
- In office 2005–2006
- Preceded by: John Carney
- Succeeded by: John D. Cherry

Member of the Colorado House of Representatives
- In office 1986–1987

Personal details
- Born: October 12, 1954 (age 71) Grand Junction, Colorado, U.S.
- Party: Republican
- Spouse: Michael J. Norton
- Education: Colorado State University, Fort Collins; Regis University

Jane Ellen Norton (née Bergman, born October 12, 1954) is an American politician who was the 46th Lieutenant Governor of Colorado and an unsuccessful candidate for the Republican nomination to challenge U.S. Senator Michael Bennet in the 2010 election. She lost the nomination to Weld County District Attorney and Tea Party favorite Ken Buck. While in office, Norton was notable for leading a successful effort to outlaw gay marriage in Colorado.

Norton became the first executive director for the Denver Police Foundation on February 1, 2007, an organization created to enhance public safety and law enforcement in the Denver community. In 2013, Norton filed a lawsuit against the state of Colorado alleging tax payer money being used to provide abortions. The Colorado Supreme Court ruled against Norton in January 2018.

== Early life and education ==
Norton was born on October 12, 1954, in Grand Junction, Colorado to Elinor Pitman Bergman (1925–2015) and Walter F. "Bus" Berman (1920–2010). Her mother was a native of Pueblo, Colorado, and taught in Grand Junction. Her father was a native of Denver and coached for many years at Mesa College—now known as Colorado Mesa University—in Grand Junction.

Norton was raised in Grand Junction. She began teaching middle school in Fort Lupton, Colorado after graduating from Colorado State University in 1976 with a Bachelor of Science with distinction in health sciences. She also has a Master's of Science in Management degree from Regis University in Denver.

== Political career ==
Before joining the Owens Administration, Norton worked as a regional director in the US Department of Health and Human Services during the Ronald Reagan and George H. W. Bush administrations. She has also served in the Colorado House of Representatives, filling the remainder of an unexpired term from mid-1986 to January 1987.

Prior to her election as Colorado's Lieutenant Governor, Norton was appointed executive director of the Colorado Department of Public Health and Environment (CDPHE) by Governor Bill Owens, serving in that capacity from 1999 to 2002. As such, she had regulatory and programmatic responsibilities including bioterrorism preparedness; disease prevention and epidemiology; health facilities; family and community health services; emergency medical services; air and water quality protection; hazardous waste and solid waste management; and consumer protection. She also created the Office of Suicide Prevention, with an emphasis on teen suicide prevention.

Additionally, Norton served in an array of ancillary capacities: Secretary, State Board of Health; chair, Governor's Expert Emergency Epidemic Response Committee; Commissioned Officer, Food and Drug Administration; Board of Directors, Regional Air Quality Council; Leadership Council of the Multi-Agency Wildfire Restoration and Rehabilitation Team; Colorado Natural Resource Damages Trustee; Colorado Strategic Planning Group on Health Care Coverage; member of the Association of State and Territorial Health Officials; National Governors' Association's Oral Health Policy Academy Colorado Team; and on the Governor's Disaster Emergency Council.

=== Colorado Lieutenant Governor ===
Norton was sworn in as Colorado's 46th Lieutenant Governor on January 13, 2003, and served in that position throughout Governor Owens' second term, until 2007. She was the third woman and first Republican woman to serve as Lieutenant Governor of Colorado. She served as chair of the Colorado Commission of Indian Affairs; liaison for the Owens Administration on health insurance reform; oversaw the state's volunteerism, mentoring, and adoption initiatives; and served as Colorado's delegate to the Aerospace States Association.

In November, 2003, Norton launched and chaired the Lieutenant Governor's Committee to Promote Adoption. She was the honorary chair of the Colorado March of Dimes Prematurity Campaign, Western Region chair for the National Lieutenant Governors Association, served on the board of directors of the American Council of Young Political Leaders, and was a member of the Women's Forum of Colorado.

In October 2003, Persons Living with HIV Action Network of Colorado honored her with the Legislator of the Year award for her leadership on legislative issues affecting the lives of people living with HIV/AIDS. Norton was also chosen by Colorado State University to serve as a Monfort Professor in Residence. In 1999, she received Regis University's David M. Clarke, S.J. Innovative Leadership Award and was the 2001 recipient of Colorado State University's College of Applied Human Sciences Honor Alumna Award. Norton has received the US Public Health Service Assistant Secretary's Award for Outstanding Accomplishment for increasing childhood immunization rates. She also received the US Administration on Aging's Outstanding Service to Seniors Award.

Norton lead the successful a 2006 campaign to outlaw gay marriage in Colorado. She co-authored Colorado Amendment 43 together with her husband, Michael J. Norton. This amendment made same-sex marriage unconstitutional in Colorado. She also opposed legal domestic partnerships via her opposition to Colorado Referendum I. She stated that "If we lose the uniqueness of marriage, we lose a fundamental building block of society."

She has also served on the Children's Basic Health Plan Policy Board; Governor's Task Force on Victim Support for the Columbine High School Tragedy; Co-chair of the Colorado Commission on Children's Dental Health; Task Force on Small Group and Rural Access Issues; the Governor's Task Force for Persons with Disabilities; and the Governor's Blue Ribbon Panel on Workforce Issues in Long Term Care.

In October 2006, she was invited to speak at the White House Conference on School Safety, where she shared lessons learned from the Columbine High School massacre, citing the importance of interoperable communications, emergency planning, inter-agency training, community participation, and moral literacy.

=== 2010 U.S. Senate campaign ===
On September 15, 2009, Norton held town-hall meetings in Denver, Colorado Springs, and Grand Junction to announce her bid for the Republican nomination to oppose incumbent U.S. Senator Michael Bennet in 2010. She joined a broad field of Republican primary candidates, including Weld County District Attorney Ken Buck, former State Senator Tom Wiens, and businessman Cleve Tidwell.

In the March 16, 2010 Colorado Caucus preference poll, Norton finished a close second (37.51%) to Ken Buck (38.15%), with Tom Wiens in third place (16.48%).

Rather than going to the convention to seek the nomination, Norton got on the ballot by petition. Buck won the convention to get on the ballot, and Wiens subsequently dropped out and endorsed Buck. On August 10, primary election day, Buck defeated Norton by a narrow 51% to 49% margin. Buck faced Michael Bennet, who had defeated Andrew Romanoff in the Democratic primary. Buck was narrowly defeated by Senator Bennet in the November general election.

== Personal life ==
Norton's husband Mike is a former U.S. Attorney for Colorado, who currently works in private practice. She has two grown children, and is an avid hiker and skier.

== See also ==
- List of female lieutenant governors in the United States

Political offices
Preceded by Joe Rogers	Lieutenant Governor of Colorado; 2003–2007	Succeeded by Barbara O'Brien
