= Anglicans for Life =

Anglican pro-life organization

- Founded: 1966 (as Episcopalians for Life)
- Founder: Joseph Harte
- Location: Sewickley, Pennsylvania
- Key people: Georgette Forney, Vicky Hedelius
- Affiliations: Anglican Church in North America, Global Fellowship of Confessing Anglicans
- Website: anglicanforlife.org
- Formerly called: Episcopalians for Life

Anglicans for Life (AFL) is the anti-abortion ministry of the Anglican Church in North America and internationally associated with some member churches of the Global Fellowship of Confessing Anglicans. AFL educates and provides pastoral resources on the right to life position on the issues of abortion, assisted suicide, elderly care, cloning and embryonic stem cell research. AFL also educates and provides pastoral resources on abstinence and adoption. The organization has volunteer Life Leaders in more than 100 parishes in the United States, Canada, Kenya and Uganda. AFL also has the support of the American Anglican Council. Anglicans for Life Canada is affiliated with the Anglican Diocese of Canada, a diocese of the Anglican Church in North America, being officially launched at May 7, 2014, in a seminar held at St. Peter and St. Paul's Anglican Church in Ottawa. The current president is Georgette Forney. The first director is Vicky Hedelius.

In the United States, the organization has EIN 52-1431886 as a 501(c)(3) Public Charity; in 2024 it reported total revenue of $386,903 and total assets of $272,154.

== History ==
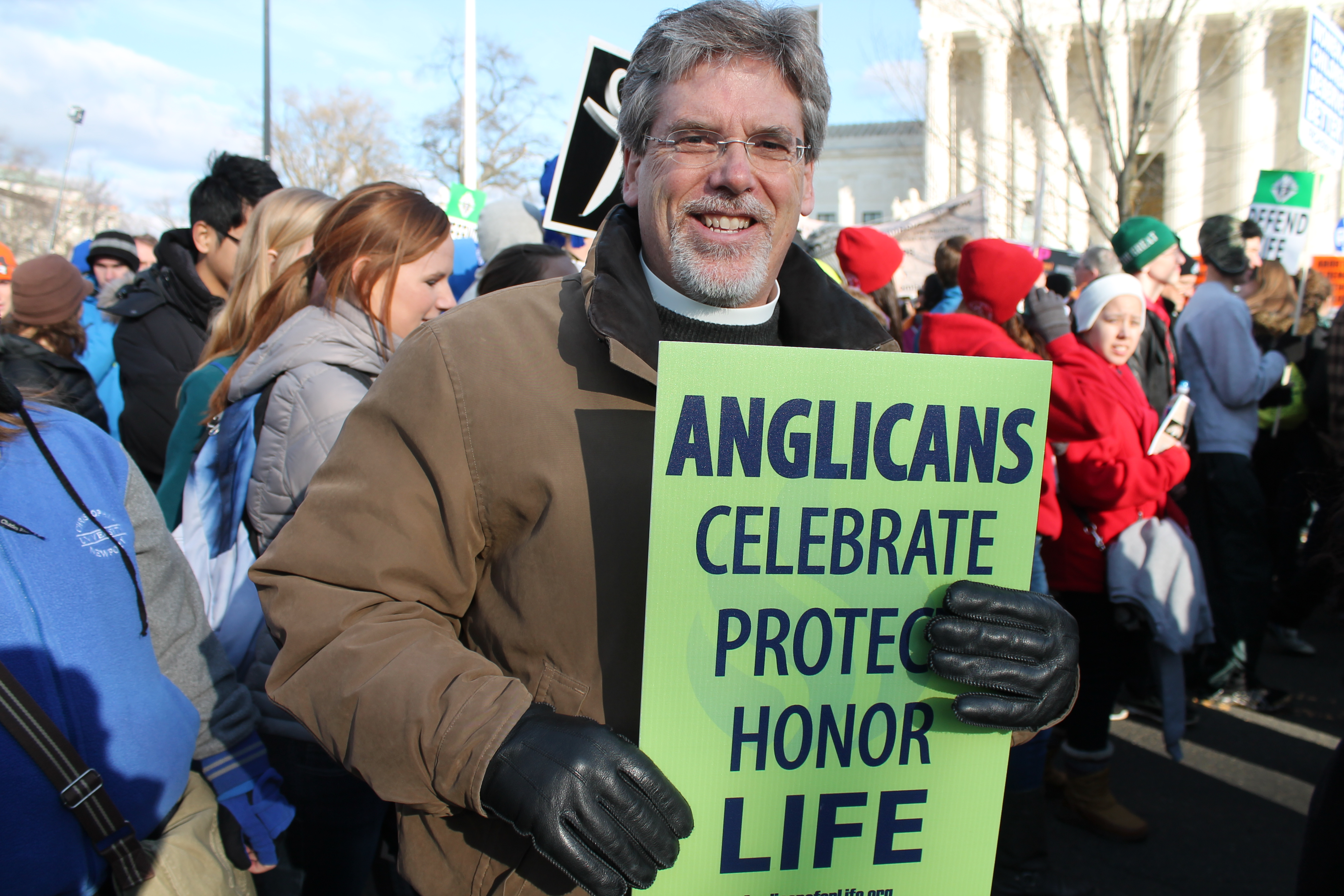
An Anglican clergyman marches with Anglicans for Life at the 2015 March for Life in Washington, D.C.

The Episcopal Church was historically anti-abortion. In 1958, it still held that "Abortion and infanticide are to be condemned." In 1966 Joseph Harte, bishop of the Episcopal Diocese of Arizona founded Episcopalians for Life, which was officially incorporated in 1983 as the National Organization of Episcopalians for Life Research and Education Foundation (NOEL).

From 1983 to 1996 NOEL operated from Fairfax, Virginia. It published newsletters and educational resources to present their anti-abortion concerns. NOEL's ministry reached nationwide, ministering to women in unplanned pregnancies, educating Episcopalians about abortion, and working to influence the church by introducing anti-abortion resolutions at General Conventions. In 1988, the 69th General Convention of the Episcopal Church adopted a resolution that stated: "All human life is sacred. Hence it is sacred from its inception until death." The statement went on to call for church programs to assist women with problem pregnancies and to emphasize the seriousness of the abortion decision.

In 1994, the Episcopal Church was the first church member of the Anglican Communion to fully support legal abortion at the 71st General Convention, expressing its "unequivocal opposition to any... action... that [would] abridge the right of a woman to reach an informed decision about the termination of her pregnancy, or that would limit the access of a woman to a safe means of acting upon her decision."

In 1996 the NOEL headquarters moved from Virginia to Sewickley, Pennsylvania. In 1998 the board appointed Georgette Forney as the fifth president of NOEL, a position formerly named "executive secretary" and "executive director".

NOEL changed its name to Anglicans For Life in 2006 as its ministry expanded to the wider Anglican Communion. In the US, AFL works with parishes of ACNA, and other Continuing Anglican groups.

The Anglican Church in North America, upon its creation, in 2009, adopted an official opposition to both abortion and euthanasia, stating that "all members and clergy are called to promote and respect the sanctity of every human life from conception to natural death". The ACNA became associated with Anglicans for Life, who has been their official pro-life ministry.

== Campaigns ==
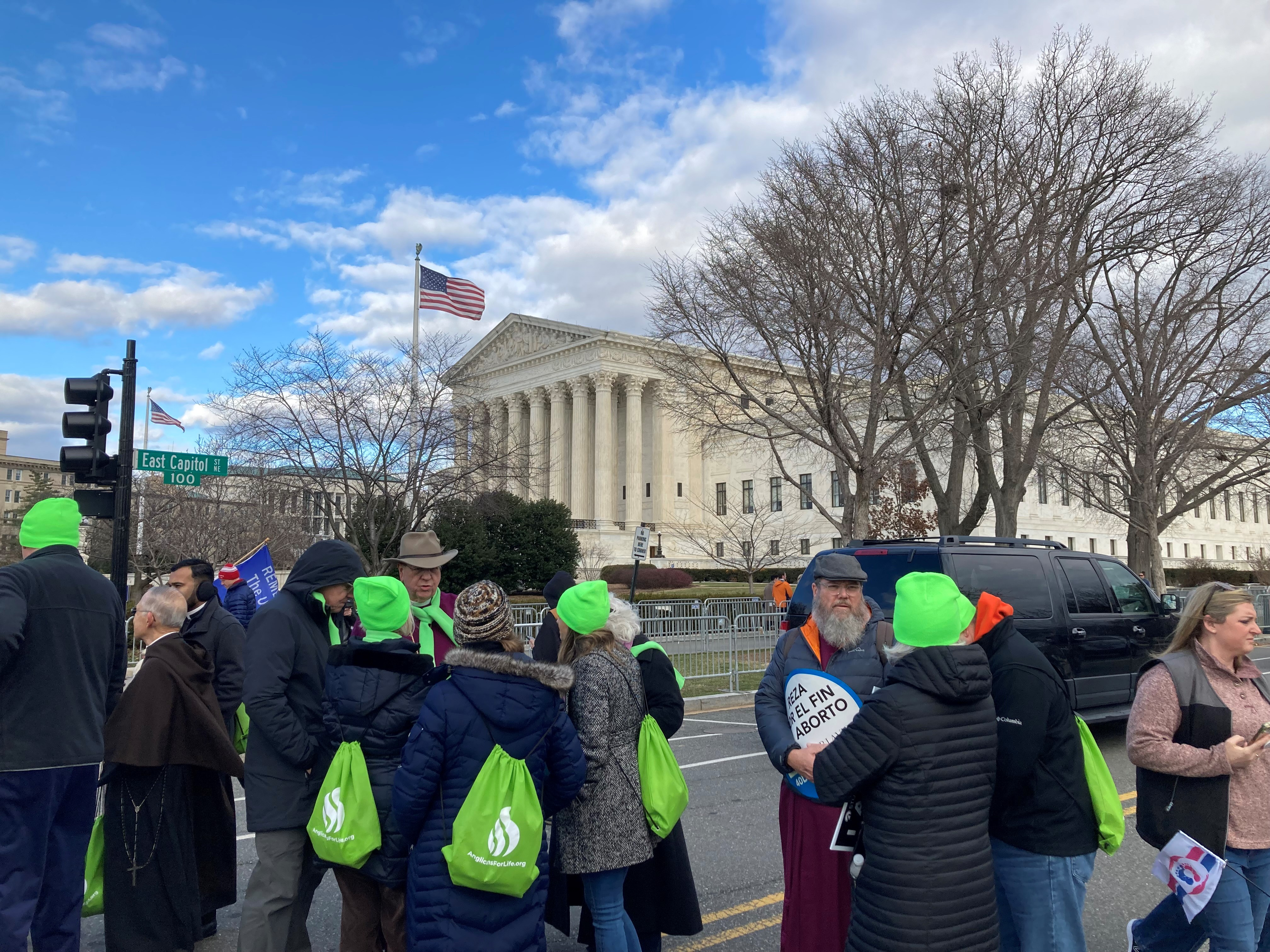
Anglicans for Life attendees gather at the U.S. Supreme Court at the end of the 2023 March for Life in Washington, D.C.

In conjunction with Priests for Life, Anglicans for Life (then NOEL) launched the Silent No More campaign in 2003 in an effort to further educate the general public about abortion and other related issues. Silent No More is a ministry started by post-abortive women and men with the intention of reaching out to other post-abortive people. The Campaign allowed AFL to network and partner with other anti-abortion organizations in the United States. In 2010, AFL launched the "Anglican Angel Ministry" to raise awareness about the need to help pregnant women and to provide a parish-based support system for single mothers. The Silent No More campaign has 80 Regional Coordinators worldwide, in the United States, Canada, Ireland, Scotland, France, Netherlands, Czech Republic, Spain, Australia and Uganda.

== See also ==
- Abortion debate
- Right to life
- Silent No More

== Sources ==
- Anglican Church in North America (2014). Constitution and Canons (PDF). Anglican Church in North America. Archived from the original (PDF) on December 25, 2016.
