= Louisiana Family Forum =

Non-profit group in Louisiana

Logo of the Louisiana Family Forum

Louisiana Family Forum (LFF) is a social conservative non-profit group based in Baton Rouge, Louisiana. The organization supports Louisiana's covenant marriage law and opposes abortion and same-sex marriage. The group's stated mission is to "persuasively present biblical principles in the centers of influence on issues affecting the family through research, communication and networking." According to its website the group "maintains a close working relationship with Focus on the Family and Family Research Council" and is part of a network of individual state Family Policy Councils. In 2023, the Southern Poverty Law Center designated it as a hate group.

== History ==
Louisiana Family Forum was founded in Baton Rouge in 1998 by a group of citizens, including retired City Court Judge Darrell White, former State Representative Tony Perkins, and LSU law professor Katherine Spaht.

The organization is currently headed by Executive Director Gene Mills, while Judge White and former State Senator Dan Richey serve as consultants. Louisiana Family Forum is a 501(c)(3) tax-exempt non-profit organization.

The Family Forum honors a Louisiana state legislator each year for the member's advocacy of moral principles and family values.

== Political advocacy ==
Louisiana Family Forum Action (LFF Action), is a 501(c)(4) tax-exempt non-profit organization advocacy group formed by LFF. Dan Richey, who holds the title of Grassroots Coordinator for LFF Action, joined the organization as a consultant in 2005. Prior to his work with LFF Action, Richey was a paid consultant in David Vitter's 2004 U.S. Senate campaign. Records show that Vitter's campaign employed Beryl Amedee of Gray in Terrebonne Parish, then the LFF Education Resource Council chairman and currently the District 51 Republican member of the Louisiana House of Representatives. In 2007, Amedee was named LFF education chairman.

== 2007 earmark ==
In September 2007, U.S. Senator Vitter earmarked $100,000 in a health and education financing bill for fiscal year 2008; the earmark specifies payment to the Louisiana Family Forum "to develop a plan to promote better science education." This received national attention and was later cut from the bill after Vitter yielded to opposing political pressure.
