= Family Foundation of Virginia =

American lobbying organization

- Established: 1985
- Founder: Walter Barbee
- Tax ID no.: 52-1425355 (EIN)
- Key people: Victoria Cobb, President
- Budget: Revenue: $1,034,803; Expenses: $959,299 (Tax year 2017)
- Website: www.familyfoundation.org

Family Foundation of Virginia is a socially conservative and Christian fundamentalist lobbying organization headquartered in the US city of Richmond, Virginia. It was focused originally on opposition to sex education. It has expanded to opposition to the Equal Rights Amendment, nondiscrimination policies, and same-sex marriage. The organization supports legal conversion therapy for minors and increased legal restriction on abortion.

Family Foundation of Virginia is a Family Policy Council, meaning it is affiliated with Focus on the Family. An associated 501(c)(4) organization, Family Foundation Action, is used for political advertising, which the Family Foundation of Virginia's 501(c)(3) tax status prohibits it from.

The organization sometimes brands itself as The Family Foundation. It is legally distinct from the Family Policy Foundation in Colorado, although both organizations are Focus on the Family affiliates.

== History ==
=== Founding by Walter Barbee ===
Family Foundation of Virginia was founded in 1985 by Walter Barbee. Barbee has stated that the roots of the organization go back to a county-level organization he formed in 1982, the Price William County Concerned Citizens Council, to oppose a sex education program for public schools.

In 1988 Barbee was calling his organization Virginia Concerned Citizens Council. Barbee appeared together with Christian author Josh McDowell before the Virginia State Board of Education to argue against Family Life Education, a program that included sex education, and the "myth that teen-agers want to be sexually active."

In 1993 Family Foundation of Virginia advocated against a lesbian mother in a custody dispute, Bottoms v. Bottoms, asking for "child protection based on the mother's sexual behavior." In this dispute, Virginia parent Sharon Bottoms was sued for custody of her son by the son's grandmother, Kay Bottoms, who viewed her daughter as an unfit parent because of her relationship with another woman. Upon learning that the judge, citing Virginia's sodomy law, had taken custody from Sharon Bottoms, Family Foundation spokeswoman Anne Kincaid commended the judge: "it took a lot of courage to draw this line."

=== Formalizing by Victoria Cobb ===
Leadership of the organization passed to Victoria Cobb in 2004. A magazine profile of Cobb states that she "spearheaded a formalizing of the group's issue areas — officially they are life, marriage, parental authority, constitutional government and religious liberty".

Family Foundation of Virginia strongly advocated for the 2006 Marshall-Newman Amendment, which added legal prohibition of same-sex marriage to the Constitution of Virginia. Executive director Cobb wrote in support that "most of us believe and understand that traditional marriage is a good thing and that kids need both a mom and a dad." The organization placed phone calls to 2.1 million Virginia households in 2006, asking about gay marriage as a part of a political survey. Larry Sabato, a political scientist at the University of Virginia, called the survey "baloney," believing it was instead an effort to drive voter turnout. The 2006 Amendment would be overturned by federal judge Arenda Wright Allen in 2014. Cobb reacted saying that the state "has no interest in affirming the love of its citizens, but it does have an interest in protecting children."

Cobb criticized a court's 2006 decision to dismiss a felony charge against a pregnant Virginia woman who had used cocaine to ease cramping during labor. She said her organization would investigate criminalizing drug use by pregnant women.

Family Foundation of Virginia opposed a 2006 proposed LGBT employment anti-discrimination law; Cobb described the proposal as "another legislative attempt to force people to believe that homosexuality is as immutable as the color of a person's skin."

In 2007 the organization lobbied for legislation to end no-fault divorce for married couples with children.

In 2012 Family Foundation of Virginia lobbied against the nomination of Tracy Thorne-Begland as a district judge, accusing him of "a violation of the military oath" because he had come out as gay while serving in the Navy during the Don't ask, don't tell policy era. Thorne-Begland's nomination was not confirmed. The gay rights group Equality Virginia issued a statement saying this was the result of pressure by the Family Foundation.

=== Blocking the ERA ===
In January 2019 Virginia was poised to become the 38th state to ratify the Equal Rights Amendment (ERA), which would have caused the amendment to cross the constitutional threshold of the number of state ratifications required of amendments. Family Foundation of Virginia lobbied against the ERA. In an editorial, Victoria Cobb wrote that she was able to "lead an organization, earning the same pay as [her] male colleagues" without the ERA, "a vague amendment promising vague rights."

The 2019 ERA ratification in Virginia failed by one vote. The Washington Post called Cobb "the new Phyllis Schlafly" for her role in defeating the amendment. Delegate Margaret Ransone, who voted against the ERA, spoke at a press conference held by Family Foundation of Virginia; she noted that most of those who had worked to oppose the ERA were women.

Virginia's legislature passed the ERA in 2020. Victoria Cobb said the amendment would "erase the entire notion of gender."
