= Minnesota Family Council =

American Christian organization

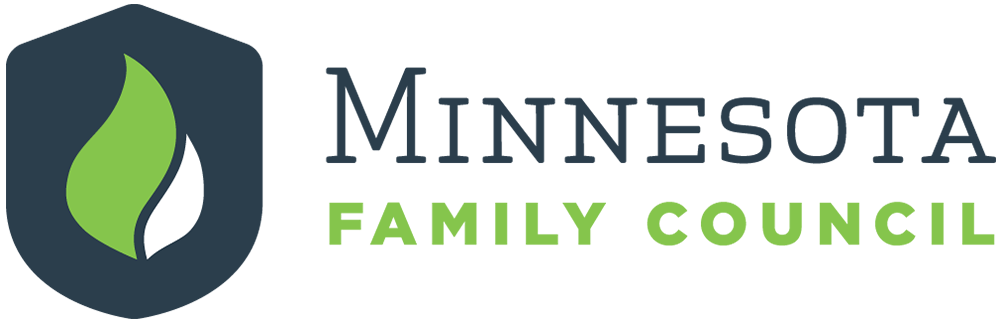
- Founded: 1983
- Founder: Thomas W. Prichard
- Type: Nonprofit Corporation
- Tax ID no.: 41-1863170 (EIN)
- Location: Saint Anthony, Minnesota, United States
- Key people: John Helmberger, CEO
- Revenue: $178,813 (2020)
- Employees: 6
- Volunteers: 20
- Website: mfc.org

Minnesota Family Council (MFC) is an American Christian organization in Minneapolis, Minnesota, founded in 1983. MFC is a family policy council affiliated with Focus on the Family and Alliance Defending Freedom. The organization advocates for the passage of socially conservative policies in the state. It also produces voter guides to encourage its supporters to elect conservative lawmakers. After registering as a political action committee in 2011, MFC has lobbied against abortion and same-sex marriage, and in favor of single-sex school bathroom and athletics policies.

== History ==
Minnesota Family Council was founded in 1982 and was originally known as the Berean League. MFC has been active in politics, representing the religious right in Minnesota, since at least 1994.

In 2011, MFC registered as a political action committee (PAC) in its efforts for lobbying against same-sex marriage.

== Positions and advocacy ==
The Minnesota Family Council advocates for socially conservative positions on prayer in public schools, LGBT rights, abortion, and school vouchers.

=== Abortion ===
MFC advocates against abortion. The group urged a halt to abortion access during the 2020 COVID-19 pandemic in the United States. In 2018, MFC supported the Trump administration's decision move to withhold federal family planning funds from clinics that provide abortion services.

=== LGBT Equality ===
MFC is opposed to LGBT equality and domestic partner benefits. In 2012, it spent almost $350,000 on the failed 2012 effort to amend the Minnesota constitution to ban such unions. It was a leading opponent of the legalization of same-sex marriage in Minnesota.

MFC has advocated against laws to ban the practice of so-called conversion therapy.

== Affiliated organizations ==
MFC's subsidiary, Minnesota Family Institute (MFI), operates the Northstar Legal Center.

MFC is locally affiliated with Focus on the Family, Family Policy Alliance, Alliance Defending Freedom, and Family Research Council.

== See also ==
- Family values
