= The Lord's Ranch =

Outreach ministry

The Lord's Ranch is the name of an outreach ministry located in Vado, New Mexico, United States, that ministers heavily to the poor in Ciudad Juárez, Chihuahua, Mexico.

== History ==
The ranch was founded by Father Rick Thomas who was moved on Christmas Day of 1972 to bring food to the poor people of Cd. Juárez. His inspiration came from Scripture, Luke 14:13, "But when you give a banquet, invite the poor, the crippled, the lame and the blind." Thomas reported that he and a couple dozen others brought enough food for about 160 people, but in the end they served more than 300 people, where they frequently scavenged at the local dump for a living with ample for take-home bags, and still more for children at two orphanages. Much of this is discussed in the Miracles section. Thomas's ongoing commitment started with food and clothing distribution and grew from there. Eventually, Juarez moved the dump, and a mission sprung up in its place which included a school, a daycare facility and a clinic.

== Ministries ==
The ranch serves as a residence for a few community members, a summer camp for poor children from El Paso and a retreat center for visitors from all over the world. Groups who stay there usually offer a donation.

=== Anti-Abortion Activism ===
Part of the ministry is for anti-abortion activism, mostly on the state side in front of abortion clinics. They hold peaceful protests where they stand in front of the clinics with signs and pray for the people going in and their fetuses. They also try to confront the mothers as they go in and convince them of alternatives to abortion. They also try to convince the groups who come through as to the importance of the issue.

=== Mexican Poor ===
The other part of the ministry is ministering to the Mexican poor. They pray over the sick and feed the poor. While they hand out food every day during their ministry all over Cd. Juárez which is packaged by volunteers either in their church building stateside, or at the mission site on the former dump in Juárez. The food goes to people that would otherwise not eat very often on their minimum wage jobs.

== Miracles ==
There have been alleged accounts of the miracles that occur with their ministry. It has been reported by visiting missions teams that the food and water that they bring across the border is allegedly multiplied in the same ways that the Bible cites in John 6:11-13. The alleged miracles started early when Fr Thomas brought food for 160 people on Christmas 1972, but allegedly ended up serving over 300 people at the Juárez dump. There was also extra food that they took to two local orphanages. The miracles aren't limited to food, as missing pieces to a radio tower they were building for their in house radio station allegedly materialized after being lost in shipping.

The ministry has grown and they now give out $6,000 worth of food a week and on top of the other ministries they operate. However, the Lord's Ranch does not ask for donations or take a collection during mass. They rely heavily on the donations of visiting groups.
