= Center for Christian Virtue =

American lobbying organization

- Established: 1983
- Founder: Jerry Kirk
- Tax ID no.: 31-1075684 (EIN)
- Legal status: 501(c)(3) organization
- Headquarters: 11177 Reading Rd # 1, Cincinnati, Ohio, U.S.
- Key people: Aaron Baer, President
- Revenue: $403,370 (2017)
- Website: www.ccv.org

Center for Christian Virtue (CCV) is a lobbying organization focused upon implementing conservative Christian sexual morality in public policy. It was originally known as Citizens for Community Values until February 2021. It operates primarily in the US state of Ohio and is the Family Policy Council (a Focus on the Family affiliate organization) for that state, with branches in Indiana, Wisconsin, and Kentucky.

CCV was designated as a hate group by the Southern Poverty Law Center from 2015 to 2017 because CCV vilified LGBT people as categorically destructive to society and families. CCV's President responded that his group’s opposition to same-sex marriage mirrors what most Catholics and evangelicals believe. SPLC designated CCV as a hate group again in 2023.

== Issues ==
Center for Christian Virtue has described its mission as: "Seeking to eliminate all activities that debase individuals by catering to that which is obscene, pornographic, or indecent." To this end they lobby to prohibit movies, artwork, dance, and writing with sexual content, particularly if connected to homosexuality, and to prohibit publications connected to LGBT social movements.

The organization lists support of "Free Speech" as a "Core Issue for a Thriving Ohio" in spite of their extensive censorship efforts.

CCV opposes legal same-sex marriage and LGBT employment protections. They also oppose gay-straight alliances and student support groups in schools, saying that "the 'safe school' message of these organizations is nothing more than a deceptive ploy".

CCV has strong affiliations with Ohio politicians, including raising support for Dave Yost and Mike DeWine.

== History ==
=== 1983 founding ===
Center for Christian Virtue was founded by Jerry Kirk in 1983 as an anti-obscenity organization. The organization's first aim was that the Cincinnati City Council would ban the Playboy Channel from local cable television. CCV opposed "the growing impact of the Playboy philosophy upon America" which members described as "the philosophy that the ultimate good is pleasure and happiness for the individual".

In the 1980s and 1990s CCV organized hundreds of people to attend city council meetings in Ohio, Kentucky, and Indiana urging city governments to outlaw pornographic movies from video stores.

=== 1990 Mapplethorpe censorship ===
CCV gained national attention for prosecuting the Contemporary Arts Center of Cincinnati in 1990; an unsuccessful attempt to censor an exhibition of photographs by Robert Mapplethorpe. Mapplethorpe's work included homoerotic images. According to Smithsonian Magazine, this was the first time in American history that a museum was taken to court on criminal charges for an exhibition. "Citizens for Community Values launched a publicity and letter-writing campaign against the show" in addition to the criminal prosecution, resulting in "thousands of letters demanding the exhibition be cancelled and that funding be pulled from the Fine Arts Fund (an umbrella campaign to raise funds for eight cultural organizations in the city)."

=== 1991 presidency of Phil Burress ===
In 1991 CCV of Ohio became officially affiliated with Focus on the Family, and the Wisconsin branch became affiliated with American Family Association. Phil Burress, a self-described former "porn addict", became head of the organization in 1991. Saying that his addiction made him unable to safely consume pornography, Burress's wife examined pornographic movies and magazines on her husband's behalf, writing summaries for him so that he could speak about them to legislators and prosecutors.

Burress led legislative efforts against pornographic movies available in hotel rooms, dedicating a budget of over one million dollars. CCV created a consumer website to rate hotels as "clean" or "dirty" depending on if the hotel made adult movies available. Ohio pornographer Larry Flynt, opposing CCV, commented "when you check into a hotel room and order up a movie, it doesn't have any effect on Phil Burress."

CCV also fought to remove works from libraries that Burress considered indecent, such as The Advocate and other LGBT publications.

In 2001 John Ashcroft, then United States attorney general, agreed to a meeting with "representatives of about a dozen anti-porn groups" organized by Burress and CCV.

=== 2004 opposition to LGBT rights ===
CCV spearheaded the successful 2004 effort to make gay marriage unconstitutional in Ohio. This ban would be challenged in 2013 by James Obergerfell of Cincinnati, leading to the court case Obergefell v. Hodges which would legalize gay marriage throughout the United States.

Community activists in 2004 sought to repeal a part of the Cincinnati city charter that prohibited the city from offering employment protection to people "because of homosexual, lesbian or bisexual orientation." CCV opposed the repeal, which CCV head Phil Burress described as "anti-religious bias." The repeal passed with tri-partisan support.

=== 2007 restrictions on strip clubs ===
Approximately 50 strippers, calling themselves Dancers for Democracy, showed up at the Ohio House of Representatives in 2007 to oppose restrictions on strip clubs drafted by CCV. Charity Fickisen, a dancer who spoke at a Columbus news conference, said "This is America, where consenting adults should be able to do what they want, as long as no one is getting hurt." Most dancers are young women with children who use their wages to pay for college, according to Fickisen.

The law restricting strips clubs passed in the Ohio legislature, so Ohio strippers canvassed the streets to gather the quarter million signatures needed to put the law on hold and onto the November 2007 ballot. CCV successfully disputed the validity of the signatures Dancers for Democracy had gathered; the referendum to undo the law did not appear on the ballot. Famous stripper Stormy Daniels was charged under this law in 2018 because she touched undercover detectives posing as customers.

=== Recent history ===
In 2015, The Southern Poverty Law Center (SPLC) designated CCV as a hate group because of anti-LGBT statements on the CCV website, such as "homosexual behavior is unhealthy and destructive to the individual, to families, and thus to communities and to society as a whole." SPLC defines a hate group as an organization with "beliefs or practices that attack or malign an entire class of people, typically for their immutable characteristics." In 2017 the CCV removed the controversial statements from their website and is no longer listed by the SPLC.

In 2019 the Ohio House introduced a non-binding resolution backed by CCV to declare pornography a public health hazard, saying that "the #MeToo movement has exposed how dangerous and harmful it is."

CCV worked closely with Ohio lawmakers in the creation of Ohio House Bill 290 or the "backpack bill" in which they drafted, edited, and reviewed the law. The bill would allow "families to choose the option for all computed funding amounts associated with students' education to follow them to the public and nonpublic schools they attend." During the 2022 Columbus City Schools teachers strike, CCV placed six billboards highlighting the bill and promote private schools through school choice programs. The organization also helped to found a "micro-school" in the Hilltop area. The private school in the underserved community, where most students are likely eligible for an income or performance-based voucher, is funded using state education dollars instead of private donations.

In 2021, CCV paid $1.25 million for a building on Broad Street across from the Ohio Statehouse. Two years later, it purchased the former Columbus Dispatch building next door for $1.1 million and intended to sell the building it purchased in 2021. The organization plans to use its close proximity to the Ohio Statehouse to influence the state's lawmakers and other initiatives.

Also in 2021, CCV president Aaron Baer issued a letter asking lawmakers to oppose the Ohio Fairness Act, which would criminalize discrimination against LGBTQ individuals. FOIA requests show that CCV was consulted by representative Sarah Fowler Arthur for legislation proposing restrictions on "divisive topics" in classrooms, and corresponded with representative Jennifer Gross on a bill to restrict gender affirming care for minors.

In 2023, Ohio lawmakers and CCV religious lobbyists began working on anti-trans legislation banning trans women from women's sports teams. In 2024, CCV solicited Utah endocrinologist Daniel Weiss to testify in a hearing about Missouri's ban on gender affirming care for minors and paid costs related to preparing his testimony. Weiss had formerly prescribed hormones to transgender adults and had no clinical experience with minors or puberty blockers.

The CCV 2024 Essential Summit featured Ohio officials Matt Huffman, David Yost, Rob McColley, and Josh Williams, as well as Ben Carson, Hillsdale College president Larry P. Arnn, and Kevin Roberts, president of the Heritage Foundation. The summit was advertised as challenging the "myth" of separation of church and state and preceded the Ohio March for Life.

== Board of directors ==
The board of directors for Center for Christian Virtue of Ohio includes:

- Joseph L. Trauth, Jr., CCV chairman and senior partner at Keating Muething & Klekamp law firm in Cincinnati
- Alex Tornero, Vice Chairman and Republican political consultant
- Sally Alspaugh, Director of Estate Giving at Cincinnati Zoo and Botanical Garden
- Ken Taylor, president of Caterpillar Inc. Ohio
- Seth Morgan, Ohio politician
- David Myhal, Ohio lobbyist for debt collection firms
