= 2006 Colorado Amendment 43 =

Amendment 43
- November 7, 2006
- Definition of Marriage Initiative

Results
| Choice | Votes | % |
|---|---|---|
| Yes | 855,206 | 55.02% |
| No | 699,030 | 44.98% |
| Valid votes | 1,554,236 | 97.99% |
| Invalid or blank votes | 31,869 | 2.01% |
| Total votes | 1,586,105 | 100.00% |
| Registered voters/turnout | 2,533,058 | 62.6% |
County results
Yes
70–80%
60–70%
50–60%
No
70–80%
60–70%
50–60%

Colorado Amendment 43 was a referendum approved by the voters in 2006 that added a new section to Article II of the Colorado Constitution to define marriage in Colorado as only a union between one man and one woman. It passed with 55% of votes. In November 2024, over 64% of Colorado voters passed Amendment J, which repealed the 2006 anti-gay clause within the state constitution.

== Background ==
On November 3, 1992, Colorado voters approved Amendment 2, which added language to the state constitution that prohibited the state and all of its subdivisions from allowing "homosexual, lesbian or bisexual orientation, conduct, practices or relationships" to provide the basis for any "claim any minority status, quota preferences, protected status or claim of discrimination." In 1994, the Colorado Supreme Court found the amendment unconstitutional. In 1996, the U.S. Supreme Court held in Romer v. Evans that the amendment, because it "allows discrimination against homosexuals and prevents the state from protecting them", was "motivated by animus towards homosexuals" and violated their rights under the Equal Protection Clause of the Fourteenth Amendment.

== Drafting ==
The amendment was drafted by Lieutenant Governor Jane Norton and her husband, former U.S. Attorney Michael J. Norton. Lieutenant Governor Norton explained "If we really don't take a stand now, it's really a matter of time before we lose the uniqueness of marriage. If we lose the uniqueness of marriage, we lose a fundamental building block of society."

== Content ==
The amendment provided that the only marriages recognized under the state constitution would be between a man and a woman whether licensed and celebrated as provided by law or established by common law by a couple who live together and hold themselves out publicly as husband and wife.

At the time the amendment was adopted, the benefits of marriage in Colorado included collecting benefits such as pensions, life insurance, and workers' compensation without being designated as a beneficiary; jointly incurring and being held liable for debts; making medical treatment decisions for each other; protection from discrimination based on marital status in areas such as employment and housing; filing income taxes jointly; and ending a marriage and distributing property through a legal process.

== Campaign ==
Groups in favor of Amendment 43 contended that it would preserve the commonly accepted and historical definition of marriage and that the marriage of a man and woman provides an optimal environment for creating, nurturing, and protecting children and preserving families. They also aimed to prevent the state courts from expanding the definition of marriage to same-sex couples.

Groups opposed to the amendment argued that it was inappropriate to add the definition of marriage to the constitution's Bill of Rights, which defines individual rights. They also argued the amendment was itself an unconstitutional form of discrimination, and redundant in that same-sex marriage was already prohibited by both state and federal statute.

== Pre-decision opinion polls ==
| Date of opinion poll | Conducted by | Sample size | In favor | Against | Undecided | Margin | Margin of Error | Source |
|---|---|---|---|---|---|---|---|---|
| 2006 | Denver Post | 625 voters | 51% | 43% | ? | ? | ? | |
| September 2006 | POS (R) for Rocky Mountain News | ? | 58% | ? | ? | ? | ? | |

== See also ==
- Marriage
- Civil union
- List of Colorado ballot measures
