= Stoneridge Group =

Marketing firm

The Stoneridge Group is a political campaign marketing firm based in Alpharetta, Georgia, with offices in Louisville, Kentucky. The Stoneridge Group provides the following services to pro-life, Republican campaigns, associations, and non-profits: voter contact mail, website design and complete online campaigns, print and collateral items, and strategic consulting. The Stoneridge Group has been honored with over a dozen Pollie Awards for excellence in design and innovation. The Stoneridge Group has served the campaigns of Rand Paul (KY) and Marco Rubio (FL) for U.S. Senate and Nathan Deal for Governor of Georgia.
