= Missouri Family Policy Council =

- Tax ID no.: 26-1215011 (EIN)
- Key people: Joe Ortwerth, Director
- Budget: Revenue: $135,785; Expenses: $116,333 (Tax year 2017)
- Website: www.missourifamily.org

Missouri Family Policy Council (MFPC) is a Christian fundamentalist lobbying organization headquartered in suburban St. Louis. It is the Focus on the Family affiliate for Missouri. The affiliate has also gone by the names Family Policy Center and Family Policy Alliance of Missouri.

MFPC describes itself as "dedicated to promoting Biblical principles in our government." It advocates for laws against LGBT rights, restrictions on stripping, and lobbies on other matters of sexual morality.

== Positions ==
=== Against LGBT rights ===
The organization opposes same-sex marriage, calling the effort to legalize it a "drive to pervert the institution of marriage." It participated in a 2014 lawsuit against gay couples trying to jointly file taxes in Missouri.

=== Opposition to strip clubs ===
MFPC lobbied to pass legislation prohibiting nudity and alcohol in strip clubs in Missouri, resulting in among the strictest such laws in the United States.

=== Opposition to abortion ===
MFPC is opposed to abortion. It sponsored laws to shut down Missouri abortion clinics using health and safety standards; the laws were ruled unconstitutional in District Court.
