= Silent No More Awareness =

Awareness campaign

The Silent No More Awareness Campaign is an anti-abortion initiative based in the United States and was established in 2003 by Janet Morana, who is the Executive Director of Priests for Life, and Georgette Forney, the President of Anglicans for Life. It operates in collaboration with Priests for Life and Anglicans for Life to raise awareness about the negative impact of abortion.

== Position and aims ==
The Silent No More Awareness Campaign has previously promoted the disproven abortion–breast cancer hypothesis, which suggests a connection between abortion and breast cancer. It has joined with other groups in protesting any modifications to the Partial-Birth Abortion Ban Act.

== Public notability ==
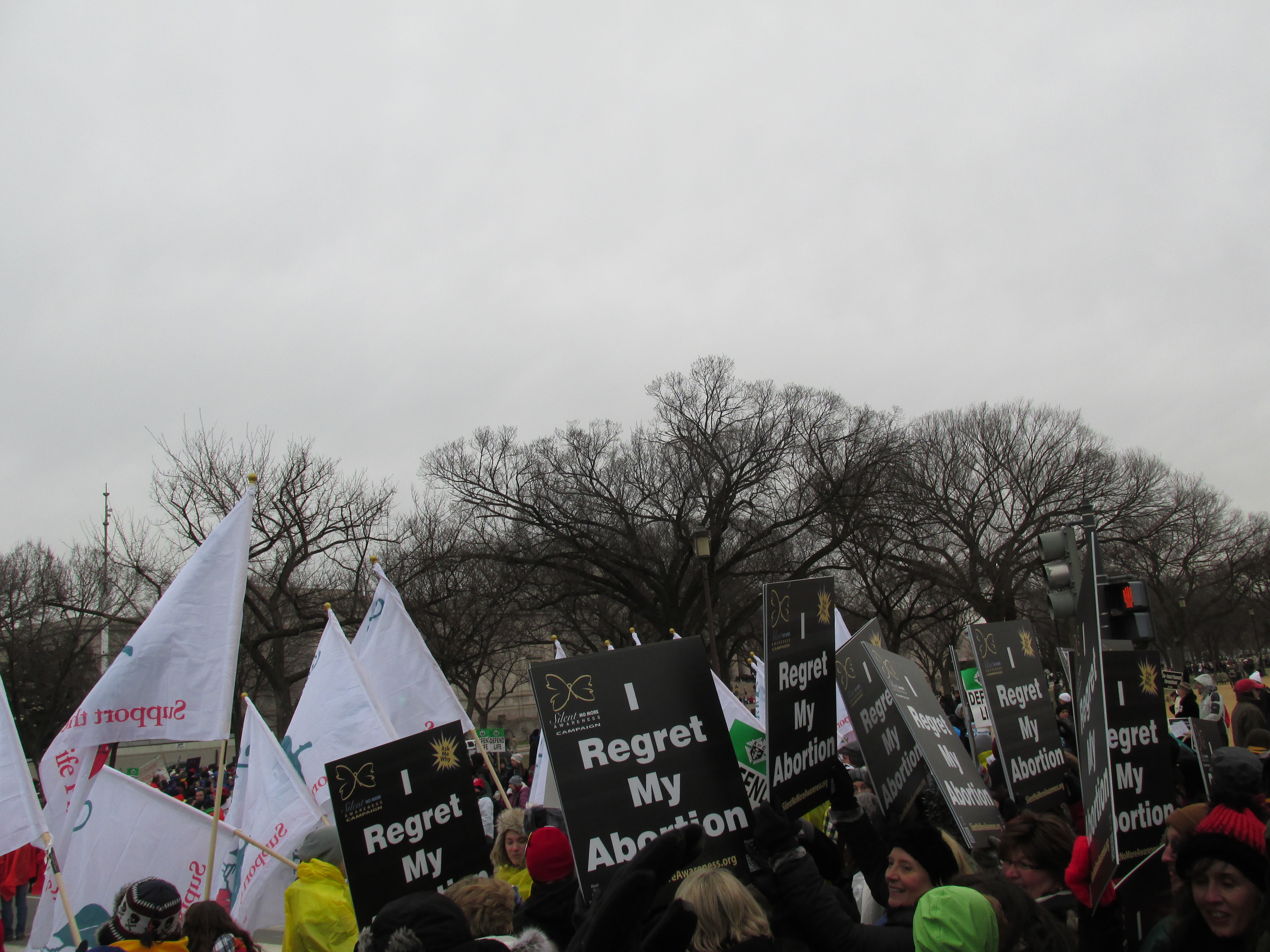
Silent No More marchers at the 2013 March for Life (Washington, D.C.)

Alveda King, niece of Martin Luther King Jr., frequently speaks on behalf of Silent No More. King herself has had two abortions and has spoken critically about the link between racism and abortion, referring to them as "evil twins, born of the same lie".
