= Catholic World News =

- Website type: Religious news website
- Available in: English
- Owner: Trinity Communications
- Creator: Philip F. Lawler
- Editor: Philip F. Lawler
- Website: www.catholicculture.org/news/
- Commercial: No
- Launched: 1996; 30 years ago

Catholic World News (CWN) is an online independent news service founded in 1996 by Philip F. Lawler providing news concerning the Catholic Church.

Staffed by lay Catholic journalists, its editorial policy is generally conservative with an emphasis on orthodoxy. Lawler founded CWN after working at the conservative think tank The Heritage Foundation.

It features an archive of over 47,000 news stories as well as editorial commentary (the "Off the Record" blog) and a forum for subscribers ("Sound Off").

The service was purchased by Trinity Communications, a non-profit corporation focused on Catholic organization web-development.

In September 2005, CWN published an article that "set off fear among some priests that the Vatican was about to institute an outright ban on gay seminarians," according to the New York Times.
