= David Reardon =

American electrical engineer and anti-abortion activist

David C. Reardon
- Education: University of Illinois; Pacific Western University (Hawaii)
- Known for: Anti-abortion activism

David C. Reardon is an American electrical engineer and anti-abortion activist. He is the founder of the Elliot Institute, an anti-abortion advocacy group, and the author of a number of articles and books on abortion and mental health. Reardon was described in The New York Times Magazine as the "Moses" of the "post-abortion movement".

== Biography ==
A graduate of the University of Illinois department of electrical engineering, Reardon began researching the effects of abortion in the mid-1980s. Reardon subsequently received a Ph.D. in biomedical ethics from Pacific Western University (Hawaii), an unaccredited correspondence school.

Reardon describes his position on abortion as both "pro-life" (believing a human fetus is deserving of protection) and "pro-woman" and "anti-abortion" (believing abortion hurts women). In a 2002 article in Ethics & Medicine, Reardon argued that in order to be effective, anti-abortion efforts had to present "a moral vision that consistently demonstrates just as much concern for women as for their unborn children." Reardon appealed to the anti-abortion movement to support his "pro-woman/pro-life" strategy, writing:

For the purpose of passing restrictive laws to protect women from unwanted and/or dangerous abortions, it does not matter if people have a pro-life view. The ambivalent majority of people who are willing to tolerate abortion in "some cases" are very likely to support informed consent legislation and abortion clinic regulations, for example, because these proposals are consistent with their desire to protect women. In some cases, it is not even necessary to convince people of abortion's dangers. It is sufficient to simply raise enough doubts about abortion that they will refuse to actively oppose the proposed anti-abortion initiative.

== Media coverage ==
In a Washington Monthly article titled "Research and Destroy", author Chris Mooney profiled Reardon as an example of what he describes as "Christian conservatives [who] have gone a long way towards creating their own scientific counter-establishment." He also notes that Reardon's findings conflict with those of the American Psychological Association, which in 1990 had rejected "the notion that abortion regularly causes severe or clinical mental problems", and with the conclusions of former United States Surgeon General C. Everett Koop.

In a front-page story for the New York Times Magazine, Slate editor Emily Bazelon describes Reardon as arguing that the anti-abortion movement will "never win over a majority... by asserting the sanctity of fetal life", and therefore should focus on disseminating information that abortion is psychologically harmful to women as a more effective strategy.

When researchers attack his findings, Reardon writes to the journals' letters pages. "Even if pro-abortionists got five paragraphs explaining that abortion is safe and we got only one line saying it's dangerous, the seed of doubt is planted," he wrote in his book.

Reardon has been described in the Boston Globe as someone who "wants Congress to impose strict barriers to abortion." The Boston Globe also wrote:

This dual role of advocate/researcher is becoming more common, especially as advocacy groups realize they can sway more opinions by asserting that their research is based on science, rather than simply on personal belief. [David] Reardon, like many people who play this dual role, insists he can objectively look at the data without being influenced by his personal viewpoint.

According to the website of the Elliot Institute, which Reardon founded, he is "a frequent guest on Christian radio and Christian television talk shows and has been a frequently invited speaker state and national conventions for crisis pregnancy centers and pro-life organizations." Reardon addressed the National Pro-Life Religious Council in 1998, where he discussed emotional reactions to abortion in the context of the disputed entity of "post-abortion syndrome".

== Elliot Institute ==
Reardon is the founder and director of the Elliot Institute, which in 2005 reported that it had two full-time and one part-time employees. According to its web site, the Elliot Institute studies "the effects of eugenics, abortion, population control, and sexual attitudes and practices on individuals and society at large." The institute was described by USA Today as an "anti-abortion organization focusing on the physical and psychological effects of abortion."

The Elliot Institute has endorsed model legislation regarding informed consent provisions for women considering abortion and bills that would increase the liability of physicians who provide abortions that are deemed "unsafe or unnecessary". The Elliot Institute is also leading an effort to build a coalition of groups to advocate for laws that would create a preemptive ban on human genetic engineering.

Reardon and the Elliot Institute opposed The Missouri Stem Cell Research and Cures Initiative, and proposed a competing initiative which would have prohibited any embryonic stem cell research which resulted in the destruction of a human embryo, as well as some other types of genetic research, in Missouri. The Elliot institute created a website which mimicked the site of a pro-stem-cell-research group, the Missouri Coalition for Lifesaving Cures. The group sued the Elliot Institute in federal court for alleged copyright and trademark violations. Consequently, the Elliot Institute website was ordered temporarily shut down by a federal judge.

== Bibliography ==
- Reardon, David C. (1987). Aborted Women: Silent No More. Chicago, IL: Loyola University Press. ISBN 9780829405798.
- Reardon, David C. (1996). Making Abortion Rare: A Healing Strategy for a Divided Nation. Springfield, IL: Acorn Books. ISBN 0-9648957-6-5.
- Reardon, David C. (1996). The Jericho Plan: Breaking Down the Walls Which Prevent Post-Abortion Healing. Springfield, IL: Acorn Books. ISBN 0-9648957-5-7.
- Reardon, David C.; Makimaa, Julie; Sobie, Amy (2000). Victims and Victors: Speaking out about their pregnancies, abortions, and children resulting from sexual assault. Springfield, IL: Acorn Books. ISBN 0-9648957-1-4.
- Burke, Theresa; Reardon, David C. (2002). Forbidden Grief: The Unspoken Pain of Abortion. Springfield, IL: Acorn Books. ISBN 0-9648957-8-1.

== See also ==
- Christianity and abortion
- Priscilla K. Coleman
