= Priests for Life =

American anti-abortion organization

- Abbreviation: PFL
- Established: 1990
- Type: NGO, Private Association of the Faithful
- Headquarters: Titusville, Florida
- National Director: Frank Pavone
- Website: www.priestsforlife.org

Priests for Life (PFL) is an anti-abortion organization based in Titusville, Florida. PFL functions as a network to promote and coordinate anti-abortion activism, especially among Roman Catholic priests and laymen, with the primary strategic goal of ending abortion and euthanasia, and to spread the message of the Evangelium vitae encyclical, written by Pope John Paul II.

On April 30, 1991, Archbishop John R. Quinn of San Francisco officially approved Priests for Life as a Private Association of the Faithful, a term drawn from the 1983 Code of Canon Law. The organization was later listed in the official Catholic Directory. Priests for Life has formed an international association of Catholics called "Gospel of Life", and has requested the Holy See to grant appropriate status and structure in the Church. Bishop Patrick Zurek of the Diocese of Amarillo stated in 2016, that Priests for Life is a civil institution, not a Catholic organization.

== History ==
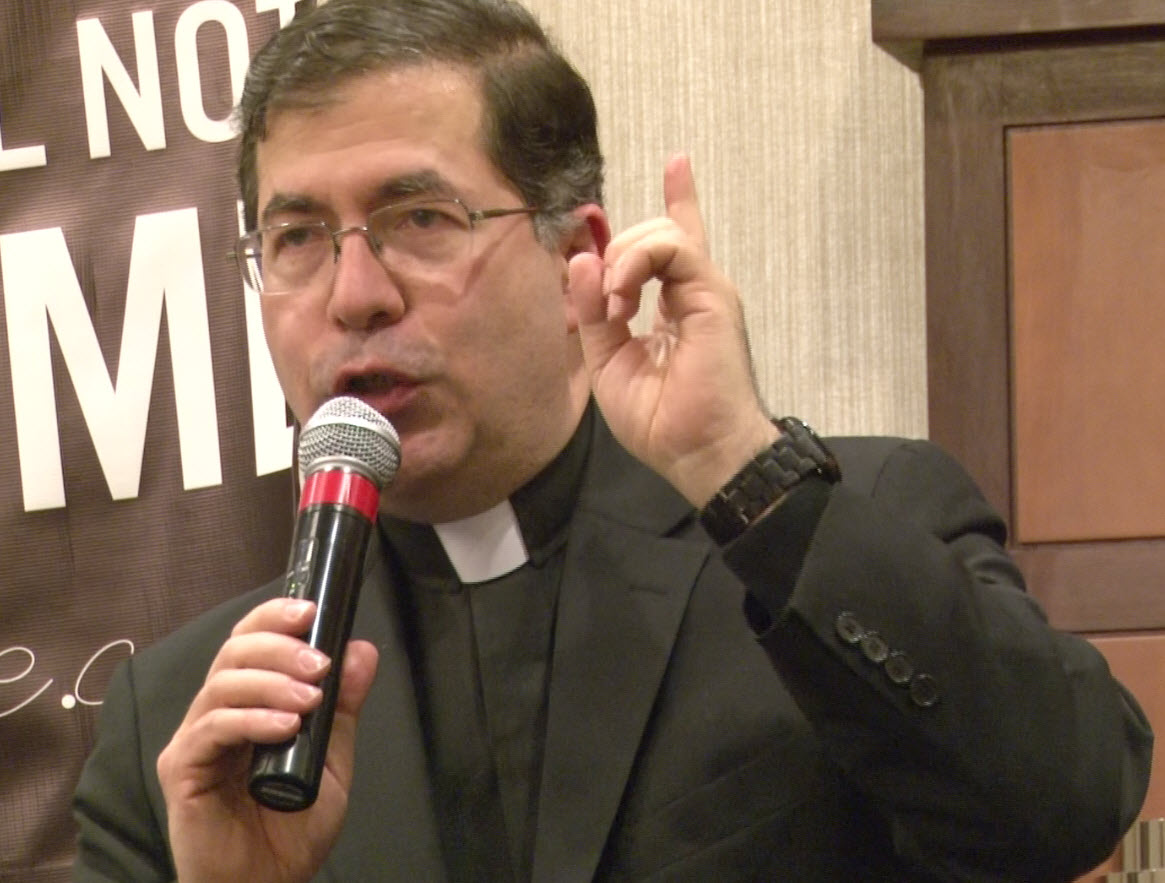
Frank Pavone

=== Finances ===
On September 6, 2011, Bishop Patrick Zurek of the Diocese of Amarillo, Texas, limited Frank Pavone to duties within the Diocese of Amarillo because of a protracted disagreement over financial transparency for Pavone's nonprofit Priests for Life and its affiliates – Rachel's Vineyard, which counsels people affected by abortion, and Gospel of Life Ministries, a lay association for Priests for Life. Pavone remained a priest in good standing until 2022, and the bishop did not allege fiscal impropriety, Gospel of Life Ministries lost its tax-exempt status for failure to file required documentation, according to Internal Revenue Service (IRS) records.

A Catholic World News analysis of tax returns indicated that between 2006 and 2008, Priests for Life spent less than 63% of its revenues on its programs. It also found that Pavone did not draw any salary from the organization. Charity Navigator Priests for Life three stars out of four, with an overall score of 82%. This score is calculated from multiple beacon scores weighted as follows: 90% for Accountability and Finance and 10% for Leadership and Adaptability. Charity Navigator also indicates that 75% of the revenue is spent on programs and 9% on fundraising. The Better Business Bureau Charity Review lists PFL as "Did Not Disclose" indicating that the "organization either has not responded to written BBB requests for information or has declined to be evaluated in relation to BBB Standards for Charity Accountability." It explained, "without the requested information, it is not possible to determine whether this charity adheres to all of the BBB Standards for Charity Accountability."

Upon an appeal filed by Pavone, the Congregation of the Clergy in May 2012 allowed Pavone to minister outside the Diocese of Amarillo, but recognized that he still must obtain specific permission to do so from his bishop.

In November 2012, the Congregation of the Clergy decided that since the principal office of Priests for Life was in the archdiocese of New York, the archbishop of New York was the competent authority to exercise vigilance over the association. Pavone subsequently complied with demands to straighten out the group's finances and returned to New York to become accountable to his home diocese.

In November 2014, Cardinal Timothy Dolan, Archbishop of New York, and former president of the United States Conference of Catholic Bishops, wrote to the bishops of the United States to advise them that the Congregation of the Clergy had conducted an apostolic visitation of Priests for Life the previous year, and had subsequently requested that he "assist Father Pavone with several necessary reforms." Cardinal Dolan wrote to advise the bishops that Pavone had not cooperated with the reforms. As a result, the cardinal told the Vatican that "I am unable to fulfill their mandate, and want nothing further to do with the organization."

In 2017, PFL moved from Staten Island, New York, to Titusville, Florida.

=== HHS contraception mandate lawsuit ===
On February 15, 2012, Priests for Life filed a lawsuit against the contraception mandate, claiming that the Health and Human Services (HSS) ruling is unconstitutional on many levels. The lawsuit was filed in the U.S. District Court for the Eastern District of New York. The case was initially dismissed without prejudice. In November 2015, the Supreme Court of the United States agreed to review the case, which it combined with six other similar challenges to the Health and Human Services' Contraceptive Mandate under Zubik v. Burwell. Briefs were then scheduled for January 4, 2016. These cases successfully relieved Priests for Life and the other petitioners of the mandate.

=== Graphic images ===
Priests for Life provides a collection of photos of live babies as well as aborted fetuses, via the internet. Its photos have also appeared in print.

=== Pre-election videos ===
In early November 2016, ahead of the elections in the United States, Pavone, a member of Donald Trump's 33-member Catholic advisory council, posted a live video to Facebook in opposition to the continued "child killing" in America, urging people to vote for Trump. The Diocese of Amarillo, Texas, subsequently issued a statement that it was opening an investigation into the placement of a fetus on an altar, which was "against the dignity of human life and a desecration of the altar." In a statement, Pavone indicated that the table was not a consecrated altar, but a table in his office.

=== Opposition to violence ===
Priests for Life rejects violence as a solution to the abortion problem. In 2001, the organization offered a $50,000 reward to anyone providing authorities with information leading to the capture of fugitives wanted for abortion shootings. In 2003, Priests for Life signed a nonviolence joint statement with Bill Baird who is "called by some media the 'father' of the birth control and abortion-rights movement."

=== Laicization of Pavone ===
In November 2022, Pavone was laicized by Pope Francis as the outcome of canonical proceedings, citing his behavior on social media and disobedience to authorities. The decree was circulated on December 13. A statement by Papal Nuncio Christophe Pierre cited the non-affiliated nature of Priests for Life and said: "Mr. Pavone's continuing role in it as a lay person would be entirely up to the leadership of that organization". Pavone had previously sought incardination in a new diocese and said in December that he believes that "the next Pope can reinstate [him]".

== Priests for Life Canada ==
Priests for Life Canada is independent of the organization in the United States. The Canadian organization stated that it was "deeply disturbed" by the actions of Priests for Life national director Frank Pavone in displaying the purported body of an aborted child on an altar. Thomas Lynch, president of Priests for Life Canada, stated that they supported the investigation concerning the video being undertaken by the Diocese of Amarillo.

== See also ==
- Rachel's Vineyard
- Silent No More
