= Abortion in Pennsylvania =

Abortion is legal in Pennsylvania up to the 24th week of pregnancy. 51% of Pennsylvania adults said in a 2014 poll by the Pew Research Center that abortion should be legal and 44% said it should be illegal in all or most cases. The 2024 American Values Atlas reported that, in their most recent survey, 60% of Pennsylvanians said that abortion should be legal in all or most cases.

The number of abortion clinics in Pennsylvania has declined over the years, with 114 in 1982, 81 in 1992 and twenty in 2014. There were 32,126 legal abortions in 2014, and 31,818 in 2015.

== History ==
=== Legislative history ===
By the end of the 1800s, all states in the Union except Louisiana had therapeutic exceptions in their legislative bans on abortions. In the 19th century, bans by state legislatures on abortion were about protecting the life of the mother given the number of deaths caused by abortions; state governments saw themselves as looking out for the lives of their citizens. The Abortion Control Act was passed by the Pennsylvania government in 1982. The law required women seeking abortions wait 24 hours before getting an abortion, and required informed consent of parents for minor children and husbands for married women. It was principally written by Rep. Stephen F. Freind.

The state was one of 23 states in 2007 to have a detailed abortion-specific informed consent requirement. From 2011, the crimes of Kermit Gosnell, a physician who ran an abortion clinic in Philadelphia, spurred federal and state bills to more strictly regulate abortion facilities. Opponents of the restrictions questioned whether stricter regulations would have deterred Gosnell, who was alleged to be knowingly in violation of existing regulations. In 2013, state Targeted Regulation of Abortion Providers (TRAP) law applied to private doctor offices in addition to abortion clinics.

An early abortion ban (HB 2315) was introduced in the Pennsylvania House of Representatives on May 2, 2018, primarily sponsored by Rep. Rick Saccone. The bill was referred to the Judiciary Committee where it died. The state legislature was one of ten states nationwide that tried to unsuccessfully pass an early abortion ban in 2018. Only Iowa successfully passed such a bill, but it was struck down by the courts. As of May 14, 2019, the state prohibited abortions after the fetus was viable, considered to be week 24 in state law. This period uses a standard defined by the US Supreme Court in 1973 with the Roe v. Wade ruling.

As of August 9, 2023, Governor Josh Shapiro says the state will not renew its funding contract with anti-abortion nonprofit Real Alternatives when it expires at the end of the year. Real Alternatives distributes funds to crisis pregnancy centers, nonprofit "clinics" that are often religiously affiliated and known to frequently disseminate deceptive and emotionally manipulative information to attempt to dissuade women from having abortions. Of about 160 crisis pregnancy centers in Pennsylvania, 27 of them receive funding from Real Alternatives. Since the 1990s, the anti-abortion group has had about $113 million in state money and $21 million in federal money (routed from the Temporary Assistance for Needy Families program) allocated in total from the Pennsylvania Department of Human Services.

=== Judicial history ===
The U.S. Supreme Court's decision in 1973's Roe v. Wade ruling meant the state could no longer regulate abortion in the first trimester. (However, the Supreme Court overturned Roe v. Wade in Dobbs v. Jackson Women's Health Organization, No. 19-1392, 597 U.S. ___ (2022) later in 2022.) In Planned Parenthood of Southeastern Pennsylvania v. Casey, the Court of Appeals for the Third Circuit affirmed in part and reversed in part, upholding all of the regulations except for the husband notification requirement. The Third Circuit concluded that the husband notification was unduly burdensome because it potentially exposed married women to spousal abuse, violence, and economic duress at the hands of their husbands.

In the 1992 U.S. Supreme Court ruling on Planned Parenthood v. Casey, the court upheld Pennsylvania's law requiring pre-abortion counseling with a caveat that materials provided to women in this counseling needed to be "truthful and nonmisleading." At the conference of the Justices two days after oral argument, Justice David Souter defied expectations, joining Justices Sandra Day O'Connor, John Paul Stevens, and Harry Blackmun, who had all dissented three years earlier in Webster v. Reproductive Health Services with regard to that plurality's suggested reconsideration and narrowing of Roe. This resulted in a precarious five Justice majority consisting of Chief Justice William Rehnquist, Byron White, Antonin Scalia, Anthony Kennedy, and Clarence Thomas that favored upholding all five contested abortion restrictions. However, Justice Kennedy changed his mind shortly thereafter and joined with fellow Reagan-Bush justices Sandra Day O'Connor and David Souter to write a plurality opinion that would reaffirm Roe.

Although upholding the "essential holding" in Roe, and recognizing that women have some constitutional liberty to terminate their pregnancies, the O'Connor–Kennedy–Souter plurality overturned the Roe trimester framework in favor of a viability analysis. The Roe trimester framework completely forbade states from regulating abortion during the first trimester of pregnancy, permitted regulations designed to protect a woman's health in the second trimester, and permitted prohibitions on abortion during the third trimester (when the fetus becomes viable) under the justification of fetal protection, and so long as the life or health of the mother was not at risk. The plurality found that continuing advancements in medical technology had proven that a fetus could be considered viable at 23 or 24 weeks rather than at the 28 weeks previously understood by the Court in Roe. The plurality thus redrew the line of increasing state interest at viability because of increasing medical accuracy about when fetus viability takes place. Likewise, the authors of the plurality opinion felt that fetus viability was "more workable" than the trimester framework.

Under this new fetus viability framework, the plurality held that at the point of viability and subsequent to viability, the state could promote its interest in the "potentiality of human life" by regulating, or possibly proscribing, abortion "except where it is necessary, in appropriate medical judgment, for the preservation of the life or health of the mother." Prior to fetus viability, the plurality held, the State can show concern for fetal development, but it cannot pose an undue burden on a woman's fundamental right to abortion. The plurality reasoned that the new pre- and post-viability line would still uphold the essential holding of Roe, which recognized both the woman's constitutionally protected liberty, and the State's "important and legitimate interest in potential life."

In replacing the trimester framework with the viability framework, the plurality also replaced the strict scrutiny analysis under Roe, with the "undue burden" standard previously developed by O'Connor in her dissent in City of Akron v. Akron Center for Reproductive Health. A legal restriction posing an undue burden is one that has "the purpose or effect of placing a substantial obstacle in the path of a woman seeking an abortion of a nonviable fetus." An undue burden is found even where a statute purports to further the interest of potential life or another valid state interest, if it places a substantial obstacle in the path of a woman's fundamental right to choice. The Supreme Court in the 2016 case Whole Woman's Health v. Hellerstedt clarified exactly what the 'undue burden' test requires: "Casey requires courts to consider the burdens a law imposes on abortion access together with the benefits those laws confer." In this case the court described the undue burden standard in its overall context with these words:

We begin with the standard, as described in Casey. We recognize that the "State has a legitimate interest in seeing to it that abortion, like any other medical procedure, is performed under circumstances that insure maximum safety for the patient." Roe v. Wade, 410 U. S. 113, 150 (1973). But, we added, "a statute which, while furthering [a] valid state interest, has the effect of placing a substantial obstacle in the path of a woman's choice cannot be considered a permissible means of serving its legitimate ends." Casey, 505 U. S., at 877 (plurality opinion). Moreover, "[u]nnecessary health regulations that have the purpose or effect of presenting a substantial obstacle to a woman seeking an abortion impose an undue burden on the right." Id., at 878.

In applying the new undue burden standard, the plurality overruled City of Akron v. Akron Center for Reproductive Health, 462 U.S. 416 (1983) and Thornburgh v. American College of Obstetricians & Gynecologists, 476 U.S. 747 (1986), each of which applied "strict scrutiny" to abortion restrictions.

Applying this new standard to the challenged Pennsylvania Act, the plurality struck down the spousal notice requirement, finding that for many women, the statutory provision would impose a substantial obstacle in their path to receive an abortion. The plurality recognized that the provision gave too much power to husbands over their wives ("a spousal notice requirement enables the husband to wield an effective veto over his wife's decision"), and could worsen situations of spousal and child abuse. In finding the provision unconstitutional, the authors of the plurality opinion clarified that the focus of the undue burden test is on the group "for whom the law is a restriction, not the group for whom the law is irrelevant." Otherwise stated, courts should not focus on what portion of the population is affected by the legislation, but rather on the population the law would restrict. The plurality upheld the remaining contested regulations – the State's informed consent and 24-hour waiting period, parental consent requirements, reporting requirements, and the "medical emergencies" definition – holding that none constituted an undue burden.

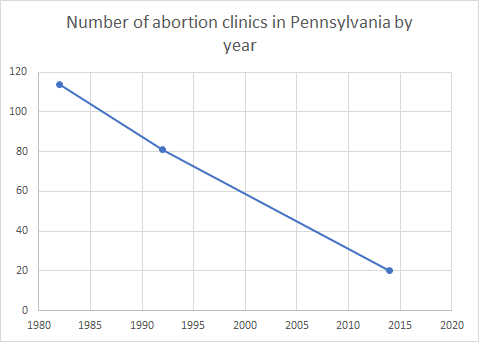
Number of abortion clinics in Pennsylvania by year

In 2024, the Pennsylvania Supreme Court ruled that the state's Medicaid program was required to pay for abortion services for participating residents. The ruling stated that "once the government chooses to provide medical care for the indigent, including necessary care attendant to pregnancy for those women exercising their right to reproductive autonomy who decide to carry a pregnancy to term, the government is obligated to maintain neutrality, so as not to intrude upon the constitutional right to full reproductive autonomy, which includes the right to terminate a pregnancy".

In 2026, a Commonwealth Court ruled that there is "a fundamental right to reproductive autonomy" in the state constitution and that the state cannot ban public funding for abortion.

=== Clinic history ===
Madame Restell opened a business that performed abortions in the 1830s in New York City. Her business remained open for around 35 years and openly advertised its services, including in newspaper advertisements. She had branches in several other cities including Boston and Philadelphia, as well as having traveling agents working for the company who sold her "Female Monthly Pills".

Between 1982 and 1992, the number of abortion clinics in the state decreased by 33, going from 114 in 1982 to 81 in 1992. In the period between 1992 and 1996, the state ranked fourth in the loss of number of abortion clinics, losing 20 to have a total of 61 in 1996. In 2014, there were twenty abortion clinics in the state. That year, 85% of the counties in the state did not have an abortion clinic. That year, 48% of women in the state aged 15–44 lived in a county without an abortion clinic.

In March 2016, there were 35 Planned Parenthood clinics in the state. In 2017, there were 32 Planned Parenthood clinics, 11 of which offered abortion services, in a state with a population of 2,825,578 women aged 15–49.

== Statistics ==
In the period between 1972 and 1974, the state had an illegal abortion mortality rate per million women aged 15–44 of between 0.1 and 0.9. In 1990, 1,480,000 women in the state faced the risk of an unintended pregnancy. In 2010, the state had seven publicly funded abortions, of which none were federally funded and all were state funded. In 2014, 51% of adults said in a poll by the Pew Research Center that abortion should be legal and 44% said it should be illegal in all or most cases. In 2017, the state had an infant mortality rate of 6.1 deaths per 1,000 live births.

Number of reported abortions, abortion rate and percentage change in rate by geographic region and state in 1992, 1995 and 1996
Census division and state	Number			Rate			% change 1992–1996
Census division and state	1992	1995	1996	1992	1995	1996	% change 1992–1996
Middle Atlantic	300,450	278,310	270,220	34.6	32.7	32	–8
New Jersey	55,320	61,130	63,100	31	34.5	35.8	16
New York	195,390	176,420	167,600	46.2	42.8	41.1	–11
Pennsylvania	49,740	40,760	39,520	18.6	15.5	15.2	–18

Number, rate, and ratio of reported abortions, by reporting area of residence and occurrence and by percentage of abortions obtained by out-of-state residents, US CDC estimates
Location	Residence			Occurrence			% obtained by out-of-state residents	Year	Ref
Location	No.	Rate^	Ratio^^	No.	Rate^	Ratio^^	% obtained by out-of-state residents	Year	Ref
Pennsylvania	32,683	13.6	230	32,126	13.3	226	4.2	2014	
Pennsylvania	32,025	13.3	227	31,818	13.3	226	5	2015	
Pennsylvania	30,954	13.0	222	30,881	13.0	222	5.4	2016	
^number of abortions per 1,000 women aged 15–44; ^^number of abortions per 1,000 live births

== Abortion rights views and activities ==
=== Protests ===
Women from the state participated in marches supporting abortion rights as part of a #StoptheBans movement in May 2019. One #StoptheBans took place in Philadelphia outside the state legislature building on May 21, 2019.

Following the overturn of Roe v. Wade on June 24, 2022, abortion rights protests were held in Erie, Lancaster, Philadelphia, and Pittsburgh.

On November 7 and 8, 2024, anti-Trump rallies were held in Philadelphia and Pittsburgh.

== Anti-abortion views and activities ==
The Democrats for Life of America are a group of anti-abortion Democrats on the political left who advocate for an anti-abortion plank in the Democratic Party's platform and for anti-abortion Democratic candidates. Bob Casey Sr., a former two-term governor of Pennsylvania, was a major anti-abortion Democrat.
