= Types of abortion restrictions in the United States =

Abortion is the termination of human pregnancy, often performed in the first 28 weeks of pregnancy. In 1973, the United States Supreme Court in Roe v. Wade recognized a constitutional right to obtain an abortion without excessive government restriction, and in 1992 the Court in Planned Parenthood v. Casey invalidated restrictions that create an undue burden on people seeking abortions. Since then, there has continued to be an abortion debate in the United States, and some states have passed laws in the form of regulation of abortions but which have the purpose or effect of restricting its provision. The proponents of such laws argue they do not create an undue burden. Some state laws that impact the availability of abortions have been upheld by courts. In 2022, Roe and Casey were overturned by the Supreme Court in Dobbs v. Jackson Women's Health Organization, meaning that states may now regulate abortion in ways that were not previously permitted.

== Abortion clinic regulations ==
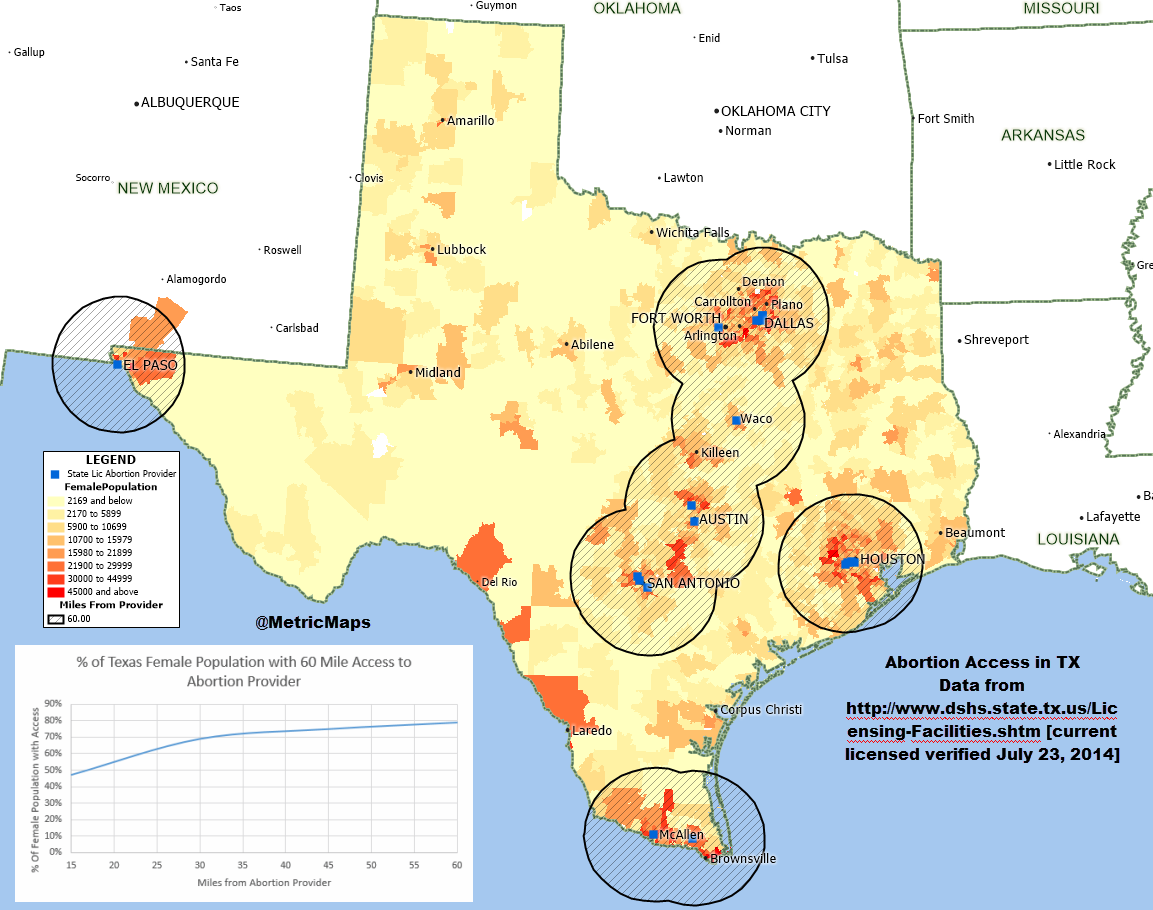
This 2014 map shows 60-mile access to abortion providers in Texas.

An abortion clinic is a medical facility that provides abortions. Abortion clinics may be private or public medical practices or nonprofit organizations. In 27 major cities, and much of rural America, most people live 100 miles or more from an abortion clinic.

Regulations for abortions in the United States include state licensing requirements, federal workplace safety requirements, and association requirements. Abortion clinics may also self-impose more stringent requirements than what these regulations require.

Post Roe v. Wade, many states have passed TRAP (Targeted Regulation of Abortion Providers) laws. These regulations are designed to limit the number of abortions performed by decreasing the number of facilities permitted to perform abortions.

One example of a TRAP law is a requirement which states that doctors performing abortions must have admitting privileges at a nearby hospital. Local hospitals may choose to deny admitting privileges to medical professionals if the medical professional is known to be an abortion provider. Critics of admitting privileges laws and other TRAP laws include the American College of Obstetricians and Gynecologists, the American Public Health Association, and the American Medical Association, which have argued that such laws are medically unnecessary and that abortion is already "very safe" in the United States.

In 2011, the crimes of Kermit Gosnell, a physician who ran an abortion clinic in Philadelphia, spurred federal and state bills to more strictly regulate abortion facilities. Opponents of the restrictions questioned whether stricter regulations would have deterred Gosnell, who was alleged to be knowingly in violation of existing regulations.

Following the passage of a 2013 Wisconsin law requiring abortion providers to have admitting privileges at a nearby hospital, three Catholic hospital systems in the state intended to deny admitting privileges to abortion providers. Wisconsin's attorney general said this intent violated the Church Amendment of 1973, which prohibits hospitals from receiving federal funds from discriminating against a doctor on the basis of whether the doctor provides abortions.

In 2015, an Arkansas law required a physician who sought to provide an abortion pill to contract another physician who had admitting privileges at a nearby hospital. As a result, no providers could offer medication abortions in Arkansas and two Planned Parenthoods within the state cancelled their abortion services. Critics argued that no evidence was presented that hospital admitting privileges improve the safety of abortions.

In March 2016, Whole Women's Health v Hellerstedt was heard by the Supreme Court, and over eighty amicus curiae briefs were filed. The case was decided on June 27, 2016, and was reversed and remanded, 5–3, in an opinion by Justice Breyer. The Supreme Court ruled that Texas cannot place restrictions on the delivery of abortion services that create an undue burden for women seeking an abortion.

In March 2020, the Supreme Court decided in a 5–4 to reverse a lower court's ruling of allowing a Louisiana law to take effect in which abortion clinics required admitting privileges within 30 miles.

In June 2020, the Supreme Court held in June Medical Services LLC v Russo that a Louisiana law requiring physicians who perform abortions to have admitting privileges at a local hospital was unconstitutional, and confirmed the Supreme Court's ruling in Whole Woman's Health v. Hellerstedt.

== Federal funding of abortions ==
The Hyde Amendment bars the use of federal funds to pay for abortion except to save the life of the pregnant woman, or if the pregnancy arises from incest or rape. Before the Hyde Amendment took effect in 1980, an estimated 300,000 abortions were performed annually using federal funds. The provision withholds federal Medicaid funding of abortions, which impacts especially low-income families. Medicaid funding restrictions decrease a state's abortion ratio by 39.76% per every one thousand pregnancies.

== Laws targeting methods of practice ==
On 18 April 2007, the U.S. Supreme Court upheld, in Gonzales v. Carhart, the Partial-Birth Abortion Ban Act that outlawed an abortion performed, in or affecting interstate or foreign commerce, using the intact dilation and extraction method. However, throughout the United States, various states have implemented Targeted Regulations of Abortion Providers (TRAP) laws and other classifications of restrictions on abortion. These laws aim to reduce the rate of abortions and limit access to medical providers, which has been proven to be less effective than anticipated in various research reviews. Researchers find the methods of TRAP laws to be practical concerning the variables of loss in opportunity and potential costs but the impacts on abortion demand are otherwise insufficient. Some states have also successfully limited abortion access to specific periods and circumstances: laws banning abortion before 13 weeks, between 13 and 24 weeks, bans on particular reasons for abortion (genetic disorders or health issues). Abortion restrictions generate the threat of legal risks among clinicians and other medical professionals and impact the quality of care and treatments for the individuals residing in restrictive states. Based on a survey conducted by the Kaiser Family Foundation (KFF) that concentrates on responses of OBGYNs and their reproductive health services, the research found that their decision-making autonomy, the ability to practice within the standard of care, and provider-patient relationships have been depreciated by the Dobbs decision and the increasing state restrictions. Additional descriptions of existing restrictive laws on methods of practice include gestational limits, state-required waiting periods, parental involvement for minors who are undergoing pregnancy, the prohibition of the use of state funds for abortions, and the lack of insurance coverage in medical insurance plans.

== Mandatory ultrasounds ==
Ultrasounds are not medically necessary for abortions; however, some states require physicians to perform an ultrasound, and some require the people seeking an abortion to view the ultrasound and listen to the fetus's heartbeat if any. As of May 2019, twelve states required people seeking an abortion to have an ultrasound before being allowed to have the procedure. This number was 26 in September 2020. 14 states required people to be issued with ultrasound information in May 2019. Mandatory transvaginal ultrasounds have been particularly controversial. In Texas, for instance, even if previous ultrasounds had indicated severe congenital defects, a person seeking an abortion was required under a 2012 law to have another ultrasound done, "administered by [their] abortion doctor, and [they had to] listen to a state-mandated description of the fetus [they were] about to abort", though state-issued guidelines later eliminated the ultrasound requirement if the fetus had an "irreversible medical condition". Some states require people to seek counseling after the ultrasound to determine if they would like to continue with an abortion.

On November 12, 2013, the U.S. Supreme Court declined to hear an appeal by the state of Oklahoma to the overturning of a bill that mandated compulsory ultrasound examinations.

== Waiting periods ==
Mandatory waiting period laws in the US, as of 2023 or later: No mandatory waiting period. Waiting period of 24 hours. Waiting period of 72 hours. No elective abortion.

In the case Planned Parenthood v. Casey, the Supreme Court upheld the constitutionality of waiting periods because the Justices determined that they don't pose an "undue burden" or "substantial obstacle" to getting an abortion. Many states require people seeking an abortion to have mandatory counseling before the procedure, and 28 of the states that require counseling have a mandatory waiting period, usually up to 24 hours, between the counseling and abortion. 16 states require a person to make two trips to the clinic before receiving an abortion because they must receive counseling in person at the clinic, wait the designated waiting period, and return to the clinic to have the procedure done. South Dakota requires the person to obtain mandatory counseling from an anti-abortion crisis pregnancy center during this time frame. Waiting periods often act as a barrier to accessing abortion because they delay the procedure and are not associated with increased decision certainty about having an abortion. South Dakota requires the person to obtain mandatory counseling from an anti-abortion crisis pregnancy center during this time frame.

Waiting periods are a method of fear mongering. An argument often used when putting them in place is to allow women to consider all their options. As of 2013, 10 states had two-visit laws. These laws require women to receive mandatory counseling in person at least twenty-four hours before their abortion procedure making women go to two appointments to obtain an abortion.

== Six-week bans ==
A six-week abortion ban, also called a "fetal heartbeat bill" by proponents, is a law in the United States which makes abortion illegal as early as six weeks gestational age (two weeks after a woman's first missed period), which is when proponents claim that a "fetal heartbeat" can be detected. Many medical and reproductive health experts, including the American Medical Association and the American College of Obstetricians and Gynecologists, say that the reference to a fetal heartbeat is medically inaccurate and misleading. They note that a conceptus is not considered a fetus until eight weeks after fertilization, and that at four weeks after fertilization the embryo only has a simple tubelike structure that will later develop into a heart. Some medical professionals advise that a "true fetal heartbeat" cannot be detected until around 17 to 20 weeks of gestation when the chambers of the heart have become sufficiently developed.

Janet Porter, an anti-abortion activist from Ohio, is considered to be the person that first authored this type of legislation. Efforts to introduce her model law succeeded in passing through political branches of government in about a dozen states but in most cases the courts struck down or blocked similar legislation; however, the Texas Heartbeat Act and analogues subsequently adopted in other states succeeded due to a unique enforcement mechanism that makes challenging the law extremely difficult, and which was upheld by the Supreme Court. In some states, the heartbeat bills' effect (whether blocked or not) has been minimized by more stringent total abortion bans that were announced following the decision in Dobbs v. Jackson Women's Health Organization; in other states, such as Ohio, South Carolina and Tennessee, judges lifted the injunctions against the previously passed laws.

Porter's anti-abortion group argues that a heartbeat "is the universally recognized indicator of life." Reproductive rights advocates, on the other hand, say that these bans are de facto complete abortion bans, since many women do not even know that they are pregnant six weeks after their last menstruation, which is on average (with a regular cycle) four weeks post-fertilization and three weeks post-implantation.

As of April 2026 5 states currently have a six-week abortion ban Florida, Wyoming, Georgia, South Carolina, and Iowa.

== Status of most restrictive states ==
The Guttmacher Institute has designated 15 states as being having the most restrictive abortion restrictions.

- Alabama
- Arkansas
- Idaho
- Indiana
- Kentucky
- Louisiana
- Mississippi
- Missouri
- North Dakota
- Oklahoma
- South Dakota
- South Carolina
- Tennessee
- Texas
- West Virginia

== Physician scripts ==
Some states require a doctor to read a prepared script to the person seeking an abortion to secure informed consent. These scripts may include medically inaccurate information intended to persuade the patient not to have an abortion, such as the claim that the abortion will increase the risk of breast cancer or of psychological problems, which are not supported by mainstream medical organizations or scientific consensus. As of July 2013, 12 states require that women be given information on the ability of a fetus to feel pain. In Planned Parenthood v. Rounds, the Eighth Circuit Court of Appeals ruled that a South Dakota law requiring doctors to give patients false or misleading information about the suicide risk in women who have abortions was not unconstitutional. Alaska, Kansas, Mississippi, Oklahoma, and Texas mandate that before an abortion can be performed, the patient must be counseled on the link between abortion and breast cancer. There is currently no evidence from scientific research that abortion has the ability to cause breast cancer. Kansas, Louisiana, Mississippi, Nevada, North Carolina, South Dakota, Texas, and West Virginia mandate that patients receive counseling on the potential psychological impacts of abortion on the person who receive them before an abortion can be given. Five states require that an abortion patient is counseled that personhood begins at conception.

== Liability ==
Physicians can be liable for the abortion of a fetus if the right procedures are not taken. Doctors should inform every patient of all material risks of the procedure. The doctors can not give a small number of details to the patient but everything that will be done must be presented. A 1997 Louisiana law creates a civil cause of action for abortion-related damages, including damage to the unborn, for up to ten years after the abortion. The same law also bars the state's Patient's Compensation Fund, which limits malpractice liability for participating physicians, from insuring against abortion-related claims. An attorney for the Center for Reproductive Rights, which opposes the law, said the law is an attempt to drive abortion providers out of practice, and that every completed abortion imposes strict liability under the law because abortion necessarily involves damage to the unborn.

== Reporting ==
As of 2010, 46 of 50 states and the District of Columbia had either mandatory or voluntary reporting of abortion statistics. According to an associate of the Guttmacher Institute, reporting requirements were generally "benign" and treated confidentially, but the requirements in some states have become more intrusive.

A 2009 Oklahoma law, overturned by a federal court in 2010, would have required doctors to report information from a 37-question form about every person receiving an abortion to the state health department for publication in an online registry. A lawyer for the Center for Reproductive Rights, a co-plaintiff in the lawsuit challenging the law, said the law would have made public potentially identifying details about the people, and was intended to dissuade people from seeking abortions. Todd Lamb, the state senator who sponsored the law, called it "essential in protecting the sanctity of life" and "pro-life".

=== Transportation Issues to accessing abortion ===
In states such as Alabama and Mississippi people often have the challenge of traveling far distances to obtain a medical abortion. As of 2019, there are only three healthcare clinics in Alabama that offer abortion. According to Guttmacher Institute, about one-third of people seeking an abortion in Alabama must travel more than 25 miles to receive the procedure. Furthermore, only seven percent of counties in Alabama have a medical provider in the county that offers abortion.After the Dobbs decision, travel times to the nearest abortion provider have significantly increased in states where abortion has been banned.

For low-income women and women of color, particularly Black women, the difficulty of accessing abortion is more pronounced. Low-income women are less likely to be able to take off work and organize childcare to travel long distances to have an abortion which significantly restricts their access to abortion compared to wealthy women who have the resources to travel out of state. Additionally, Southern and Midwestern states that have banned abortion after the reversal of Roe v. Wade have a higher population of Black women who will not be able to access the procedure in their state.

People often must seek two trips to an abortion provider due to a waiting period between mandated counseling and the procedure. The waiting period is typically 24 hours before the scheduled abortion. There are organizations such as the Yellowhammer Fund which help people seeking an abortion by assisting with payments and providing logistical support. This can help ease the burden of costs associated with transportation for people seeking an abortion. On the other hand, most clinics do not offer transportation or financial resources to patients. Most of the time, it is the responsibility of a patient to find their means of transportation and finances to fund the abortion.

Access to abortion and other reproductive health procedures in the United States varies among specific state policies, and they are usually provided in separate facilities other than hospitals. However, due to changes in restrictions in certain states, many individuals have to travel across state lines to obtain the care they require. For example, according to research from the CDC, an average of 8% of patients have left their state of residence for abortion care, and overall, 71% of patients have traveled from a state with restrictive policies. While it might seem somewhat affordable to travel across the states for reproductive healthcare, it has created a significant burden on those who have low incomes or have dealt with other forms of systemic oppression. The rise of stigma and prejudices against those who need abortion care have caused an incline in emotional and mental strain, which can also impact an individual's well-being and decisions. The geographical locations of abortion facilities and accessibility impact the general demand of abortion by reducing search costs, travel time, and travel expenses.

=== Language barriers and immigrant issues related to abortion ===
An issue that can arise among non-native English speakers or immigrant people is the lack of access to a translator while attempting to seek an abortion. Under federal law, citing the Title VI of the Civil Rights Act of 1964 and the Affordable Care Act requires that providers who receive federal funding provide an oral interpreter and translated material. According to the American Civil Liberties Union, in 1976, Congress passed a bill called the Hyde Amendment which purposely excludes abortion from being included in healthcare services provided to people through Medicaid. The only exception to this rule is if a person's life is in danger due to pregnancy, cases of rape or incest, illness, or injury. This results in many healthcare clinics that offer abortion, not being able to accommodate non-English speaking patients. Due to the limitations set by the federal government. There are limited resources for non-English speaking patients when it comes to abortion.

Additionally, when it comes to organizations such as the United States Immigration and Customs Enforcement (ICE), abortion is heavily regulated. ICE complies with the Hyde Amendment from 1976, and only offers abortion for reasons related to incest, rape, or the endangerment of a mother's life due to pregnancy. According to the National Latina Institute for Reproductive Justice, around 80% of women attempting to enter the United States through illegal means, get sexually assaulted. Thus, a high number of women in ICE detention centers often seek medical abortions. Furthermore, there have been proposals by Alabama Representative Robert Aderholt to attempt to allow ICE employees to refuse to conduct an abortion. Such proposals have so far not passed in congress. Under the Trump administration, minors who were held in ICE custody were unable to seek an abortion. According to PBS, a federal appeals court ruled against the Trump administration on June 14, 2019. The three federal judges cited that the Trump administration could not regulate a minor's decision to receive a medical abortion. Furthermore, the policy dates to 2017, when the ban was supposed to take effect. The ban specifically targets immigrant minors attempting to enter the country, which is then held by the United States government for attempting to illegally enter the US. At the time, the Trump administration could have attempted to ask the United States Court of Appeals to hear the case, but that seems to have never gone through.

=== Impact of the COVID-19 pandemic on access to abortion ===
In March 2020, COVID-19 impacted the United States, and the CDC declared COVID-19 a pandemic. During this time, numerous states began issuing orders to postpone any non-essential medical products, specifically abortion. Texas restricted abortion access on March 23, 2020, citing that a temporary ban on non-essential medical services was necessary to curb the COVID-19 pandemic. In the following weeks, more states such as Ohio, Alabama, Iowa, and Oklahoma followed Texas in the same ban on non-essential produces. In a press conference on March 27, 2020, Iowa Governor Kim Reynolds clarified that surgical abortion procedures would be included in the temporary hold on all non-essential surgeries.

The Supreme Court accepted a request from the Food and Drug Administration to ban medical providers from sending mifepristone (the “abortion pill”) via mail. This pill is primarily used for ending pregnancies that are within the first trimester. The rule was suspended by a federal judge in the summer of 2020 due to the ongoing pandemic. The reinstated rule forces people seeking an abortion to go into a medical provider's office and have an in-person visit to receive the pill. The Food and Drug Administration attempted to appeal the original decision on August 26, 2020, to the Supreme Court. The Supreme Court responded with a denial to the Food and Drug Administration to overturn the order. The Supreme Court cited that the Food and Drug Administration needed to provide more information as to why Judge Chuang's order needed to be overturned. Finally, on January 12, 2021, the Trump Administration submitted a more detailed request, which was granted by the Supreme court to lift the suspension on not requiring in-person visits and mailing of the abortion pill.

=== Limitations for minors under 18 ===
In around 37 states, a parental figure is required to have a say in a minor's decision related to abortion. More specifically, parental consent laws require an unmarried minor to obtain consent from a parent or judge. In 27 states, one or both parents are required to give their permission to the minor. By age twenty, 40 percent of teenage women have been pregnant, 84% of which are unintended. Ten states require both parents to consent to medical abortion. Furthermore, a minor may not have the finances or transportation to seek an abortion. Since most minors are labeled as dependent on their parents' or guardians' tax forms, they most likely do not have the money to obtain an abortion. Also, if the minor is on their guardian's insurance, the guardian has access to the health insurance and information of the minor. It is estimated that around 350,000 United States teenagers under the age of 18 become pregnant each year. Of that population, around 31% of them have a medical abortion.

=== Insurance limitations ===
In twelve states, private insurance is restricted from covering abortion under their plans. In most cases, insurance only covers abortion if a person's life is endangered by a medical professional. If an underinsured or uninsured person seeks an abortion, they may need to pay out-of-pocket costs to receive the treatment needed. These limitations of the lack of insurance coverage greatly affect mostly low-income minorities. The average "abortion pill" costs around US$500. On top of that, under the Affordable Care Act passed in 2010 by congress, abortion is not required to be covered under the ten essential coverages. Government-run health insurance, such as Medicaid, can provide coverage for medical abortion.

== See also ==
- Unborn Victims of Violence Act
- Abortion in the United States
- Abortion in the United States by state
- Hyde Amendment
- Minors and abortion
- Partial-Birth Abortion Ban Act
- Trigger law
- War on women
- Whole Woman's Health v. Cole
