= Planned Parenthood v. Rounds =

2012 US legal decision

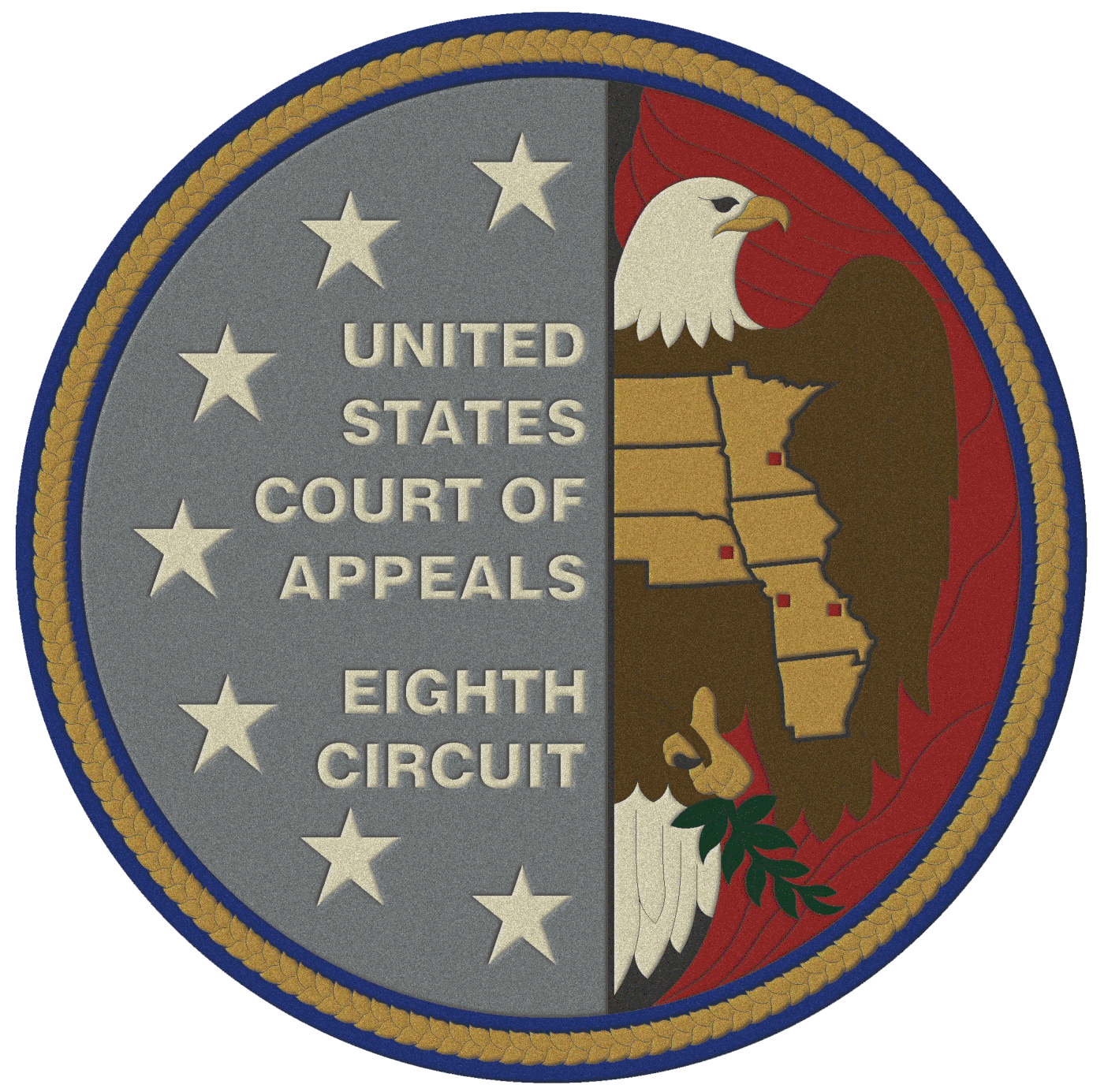
- Court: United States Court of Appeals for the Eighth Circuit
- Full case name: Planned Parenthood Minnesota, North Dakota, South Dakota; Carol E. Ball, M.D. v. Mike Rounds, Governor; Marty J. Jackley, Attorney General, in their official capacities, et al.
- Submitted: January 9, 2012
- Decided: July 24, 2012
- Citation: 686 F.3d 889

Case history
- Prior history: Preliminary injunction granted, 375 F. Supp. 2d 881 (D.S.D. 2005); injunction vacated, remanded, 530 F.3d 724 (8th Cir. 2008); summary judgment granted in part, denied in part, 650 F. Supp. 2d 972 (D.S.D. 2009); affirmed in part, reversed in part, 653 F.3d 662 (8th Cir. 2011); rehearing en banc granted, 662 F.3d 1072 (8th Cir. 2011)

Court membership
- Judges sitting: William J. Riley, Roger Leland Wollman, James B. Loken, Diana E. Murphy, Kermit Edward Bye, Michael Joseph Melloy, Lavenski Smith, Steven Colloton, Raymond Gruender, Duane Benton, Bobby Shepherd (en banc)

Case opinions
- Majority: Gruender, joined by Riley, Loken, Smith, Benton, Shepherd
- Concurrence: Loken
- Concur/dissent: Colloton
- Dissent: Murphy, joined by Wollman, Bye, Melloy

Laws applied
- U.S. Const. amends. I; XIV

Keywords
- Abortion

Planned Parenthood v. Rounds, 686 F.3d 889 (8th Cir. 2012) (en banc), is an Eighth Circuit decision addressing the constitutionality of a South Dakota law which forced doctors to make certain disclosures to patients seeking abortions. The challenged statute required physicians to convey to their abortion-seeking patients a number of state-mandated disclosures, including a statement that abortions caused an "[i]ncreased risk of suicide ideation and suicide." Planned Parenthood of Minnesota, North Dakota, South Dakota, along with its medical director Dr. Carol E. Ball, challenged the South Dakota law, arguing that it violated patients' and physicians' First Amendment free speech rights and Fourteenth Amendment due process rights. After several appeals and remands, the Eighth Circuit, sitting en banc, upheld the South Dakota law, holding that the mandated suicide advisement was not "unconstitutionally misleading or irrelevant," and did "not impose an unconstitutional burden on women seeking abortions or their physicians." This supplemented the Eighth Circuit's earlier rulings in this case, where the court determined that the state was allowed to impose a restrictive emergency exception on abortion procedures and to force physicians to convey disclosures regarding the woman's relationship to the fetus and the humanity of the fetus.

== Background ==
=== Legal backdrop ===
In Roe v. Wade, 410 U.S. 113 (1973), the United States Supreme Court held that the United States Constitution protects a woman's right to choose to have an abortion without being subject to excessive government restrictions. The Court-based this right in the fundamental "right to privacy" which it found to be inherent to the Due Process Clause of the Fourteenth Amendment. Per Roe, a women's right to an abortion must be balanced against the government's legitimate interests in protecting women's health and the "potentiality of human life" (i.e., a fetus).

Almost twenty years after Roe, the Supreme Court issued its next major abortion decision in a case challenging a Pennsylvania statute that imposed—among other requirements—mandatory waiting periods, spousal notice, and parental consent for minors seeking abortions. In Planned Parenthood v. Casey, 505 U.S. 833 (1992), the Court reaffirmed the constitutional right to have an abortion, as established in Roe v. Wade, but changed the standard employed to evaluate restrictions on that right. The Supreme Court created the "undue burden" standard for abortion restrictions, whereby a restriction is deemed impermissible if "its purpose or effect is to place a substantial obstacle in the path of a woman seeking an abortion before the fetus attains viability."

=== The challenged law ===
In 2005, the South Dakota legislature enacted House Bill 1166, which revised the requirements for obtaining patients' informed consent to an abortion by expanding the law's disclosure requirements. The law was set to go into effect on July 1, 2005, and subjected abortion providers to the risk of criminal prosecution if they did not meet the statutory requirements.

The bill required physicians who perform abortions to inform abortion-seeking patients, in writing, that "the abortion will terminate the life of a whole, separate, unique living being," that "the pregnant woman has an existing relationship with that unborn human being and that the relationship enjoys protection under the United States Constitution and under the laws of South Dakota," and that "by having an abortion, her existing relationship and her existing constitutional rights with regards to that relationship will be terminated" (relationship disclosures). The law further required a physician performing an abortion to "certify in writing" that he or she had made all of the state-mandated disclosures and that the "physician is, to the best of his or her ability, satisfied that the pregnant woman has read" the state-mandated disclosures and that "the physician believes she understands the information imparted." The South Dakota law also forced the pregnant woman to "sign[] each page of the written disclosure with the certification that she has read and understands all of the disclosures."

Doctors were prohibited from performing an abortion unless the doctor provided her patient that with a list of "all known medical risks of the procedure and statistically significant risk factors to which the pregnant woman would be subjected, including:...[i]ncreased risk of suicide ideation and suicide" (medical risk disclosures/suicide advisory). The law also stated that a physician may not perform a medically emergent abortion to which a pregnant woman has not consented "unless the physician determines that obtaining an informed consent is impossible due to a medical emergency and further determines that delaying in performing the procedure until an informed consent can be obtained from the pregnant woman or her next of kin in accordance with chapter 34-12C is impossible due to the medical emergency" (medical emergency exception).

== Procedural history ==
=== Planned Parenthood's challenge ===
Planned Parenthood of Minnesota, North Dakota, South Dakota along with its medical director Dr. Carol E. Ball (hereinafter collectively "Planned Parenthood") challenged the South Dakota law in a lawsuit filed with the District Court for the District of South Dakota, asking the district court to declare the contested provisions unconstitutional and to grant injunctive relief precluding enforcement of those provisions. Planned Parenthood argued that various provisions of the South Dakota law constituted an undue burden on abortion rights, facially violated patents' and physicians' First Amendment rights, and were unconstitutionally vague. Planned Parenthood believed that the amendments to South Dakota's notice law forced abortion providers to convey the state of South Dakota's ideology and philosophical beliefs regarding abortion, in violation of their First and Fourteenth Amendment rights. Planned Parenthood also argued that the law violated pregnant women's First and Fourteenth Amendment rights by forcing them to listen to and understand the state's anti-abortion beliefs. Planned Parenthood further contended that the state violated pregnant women's Fourteenth Amendment right to privacy and liberty by forcing them to listen to and certify an understanding of untrue and misleading information about abortion, and that this amounted to an undue burden on women's right to choose an abortion. Plaintiff finally argued that other provisions in the statute were impermissibly vague, in violation of the Fourteenth Amendment's due process clause, and that the law's health exception was inadequate.

=== District court ruling ===
The district court preliminarily enjoined the Act, preventing the statute from taking effect. The district court found that the informed consent provisions contained in the challenged South Dakota law went "much further than the informed consent statute upheld in Casey, and other cases reviewing similar statutes." The district court held that the mandated disclosures were not a reasonable regulation of the medical profession, and instead violated the physicians' First Amendment rights "by compelling them to espouse the state's ideology" "on an unsettled medical, philosophical, theological, and scientific issue." The district court found it significant that the statute lacked a provision expressly allowing a physician to disassociate herself from the required disclosures (which had been a feature of a similar North Dakota law). The district court granted a preliminary injunction based on its finding that Planned Parenthood had a fair chance of success on its claim that the law violated physicians' free speech rights, and that the balance of the harms came out in Planned Parenthood's favor.

=== Appeal to the Eighth Circuit ===
On July 26, 2005, the state, along with crisis pregnancy centers that had intervened in the case, appealed the district court's preliminary injunction to the Eighth Circuit. A divided panel of the Eighth Circuit affirmed the lower court's decision to grant the preliminary injunction. The defendants and intervenors then petitioned the Eighth Circuit for a re-hearing en banc, which the Eighth Circuit granted.

The Eighth Circuit, sitting en banc, vacated the preliminary injunction and remanded the case to the district court for future proceedings. The Eighth Circuit found that Planned Parenthood had failed to demonstrate the requisite likelihood of success on its claim that the statutorily-required disclosure was untruthful and misleading. As part of its holding, the Eighth Circuit clarified that "where a preliminary injunction of a duly enacted state statute is sought, we require a more rigorous threshold showing that the movant is likely to prevail on the merits." The Eighth Circuit stated that Planned Parenthood could only succeed on the merits of its claim that the law violated the First Amendment if it showed that the required disclosures were untruthful, misleading, or not relevant to the pregnant woman's decision to abort. The Eighth Circuit found that the district court had based its conclusion "on an error of law when it ignored the statutory definition of 'human being.'"

=== Remand to the District Court ===
On remand to the district court, all sides moved for summary judgment with respect to the challenged provisions. The district court issued rulings on the biological disclosure, the relationship disclosures, the medical risk disclosures, and the medical emergency exception.

==== Biological disclosure ====
The biological disclosure was the statutory requirement that a doctor tell a pregnant patient "[t]hat the abortion will terminate the life of a whole, separate, unique, living human being." Although defendants' oral argument and Judge Gruender's dissent in the initial Eighth Circuit opinion both suggested that the statute did not require doctors to dictate the statute verbatim to their patients, the district court was bound to follow the Eighth Circuit's en banc opinion which stated that the disclosure had to consist of the language laid out in the statute. The district court, therefore, found that prior to performing an abortion, a doctor must recite the biological disclosure outlined in the statute.

==== Relationship disclosures ====
The South Dakota statute mandated two relationship disclosures. Physicians were required to tell a pregnant patient that she had an existing "relationship" with an unborn human being which was protected by the U.S. Constitution and South Dakota law, and that procuring an abortion would end that existing "relationship." The statute did not define the term "relationship" and the state had conceded in an earlier proceeding that the term was used in a legal—not biological—context. The district court found that the legal definition of a relationship requires at least two people. Furthermore, the U.S. Constitution does not comprehend an embryo or fetus to be a "person," in the legal sense of that word. In fact, the district court noted that in Roe v. Wade, which remained controlling precedent, the Supreme Court stated that "the word 'person,' as used in the Fourteenth Amendment, does not include the unborn" and that "the unborn have never been recognized in the law as persons in the whole sense." South Dakota similarly had not established that an embryo or fetus was a "person" in the context of a legal relationship with a pregnant woman. The district court thus found the relationship disclosures to be untruthful and misleading, and thus unconstitutional.

==== Medical risk disclosures ====
The medical risk disclosures mandated by the statute required a physician to tell a patient of "all known medical risks of the procedure and statistically significant risk factors to which the pregnant woman would be subjected, including ... (ii) Increased risk of suicide ideation and suicide." Although the district court found the "all known medical risks" phrase constitutional on its face, since an individual could ascertain the meaning of that phrase in order to comply with it, the district court found the phrase "statistically significant risk factors" unconstitutionally vague because its meaning was not readily ascertainable. Following common cannons of statutory construction, the district court reasoned that the statute dictated that physicians inform patients of medical risks caused by abortions. Because no party presented evidence that proved that it was a generally recognized fact that abortions cause an increased risk of suicide ideation and suicide, the district court found the mandated disclosure of that "risk" to be untruthful and misleading, and thus unconstitutional.

==== Medical emergency exception ====
The medical emergency exception is found in the portion of the statutes that required the physician to obtain the informed consent of the pregnant woman unless it is impossible due to do so due to a medical emergency and where delaying the procedure in order to get consent from the woman's next of kin is similarly impossible. The district court dismissed the defendants' argument that the plaintiffs lacked standing to sue on this matter, citing controlling precedent which gave abortion doctors standing to challenge a statute that might subject them to criminal prosecution. The district court further concluded that the physician plaintiffs had third-party standing. The district court nevertheless found the emergency medical exception to be constitutional on its face.

==== Summary of District Court opinion ====
In summary, the District Court granted summary judgement in favor of Planned Parenthood on the relationship and suicide advisories—which it struck down as unconstitutional under the First and Fourteenth Amendments—and summary judgement in favor of South Dakota on the human being and risk advisories.

=== Second appeal to the Eighth Circuit ===
South Dakota and the intervening crisis pregnancy centers appealed the District Court's rulings in Planned Parenthood's favor, and Planned Parenthood cross appealed the rulings in South Dakota's favor.

On appeal, the Eighth Circuit panel rejected Planned Parenthood's facial challenge to the human being advisory contained within the statute's relationship disclosures. The panel said that an as-applied challenge would be the only appropriate means for a court to consider whether a doctor would be permitted to use language other than that detailed in the advisory. The Eighth Circuit also rejected Planned Parenthood's allegation that the relationship disclosure unconstitutionally forced doctors to convey moral and philosophical messages regarding abortion. Instead, the Eighth Circuit adopted the reading proposed by South Dakota, holding that the relationship disclosure merely informed a woman that she "is legally and constitutionally protected against being forced to have an abortion." The Eighth Circuit described this reading of the statute to be "truthful, not misleading, and relevant to the abortion decision," and thus constitutional. The Eighth Circuit rejected Planned Parenthood's broad challenge to the medical risk disclosure as being void for vagueness, reasoning that a doctor of ordinary intelligence could figure out how to comply with the statute. The Eighth Circuit panel, however, did agree with the district court and Planned Parenthood on the unconstitutionality of the suicide advisory that formed part of the medical risk disclosure. The Eighth Circuit found the suicide advisory to be compelled untruthful speech, which placed an undue burden on women's due process right to voluntary abortion and violated physicians' "First Amendment right to be free from compelled speech that is untruthful, misleading, or irrelevant."

The defendants and the intervening crisis pregnancy centers then petitioned for a rehearing en banc. The rehearing en banc was "limited to the issue of whether the district court erred in enjoining the provisions of South Dakota Century Law 34–23A–10.1(1)(e)(ii) dealing with the suicide advisory."

== Final Eighth Circuit decision ==
The Eighth Circuit granted a rehearing en banc solely to resolve the question of the constitutionality of the mandated suicide advisory. The Eighth Circuit held that the mandated suicide advisory was truthful and did not impose an unconstitutional undue burden on women seeking abortions or their physicians.

The Eighth Circuit maintained that for Planned Parenthood to win on either its undue burden or compelled speech claims, it needed to demonstrate that the suicide advisory was untruthful, misleading, or not relevant to the pregnant patient's abortion decision. The Eighth Circuit maintained that Planned Parenthood had failed to meet its burden of proof. Unlike the district court and the prior Eighth Circuit panel, the en banc Eighth Circuit did not read the statutory language to require the disclosure of a causal connection between abortion and suicide. Rather, the Eighth Circuit read the phrase "increased risk" in the statute to mean "relative risk" and to not require proof of causation.

After examining the record, the Eighth Circuit concluded that "the studies submitted by the State are sufficiently reliable to support the truth of the proposition that the relative risk of suicide and suicide ideation is higher for women who abort their pregnancies compared to women who give birth or have not become pregnant," and that this relative risk is generally "known." The Eighth Circuit thus concluded that the disclosure mandated by the suicide advisory was truthful.

Planned Parenthood argued that the suicide advisory was misleading and irrelevant because the correlation between abortion and suicide was likely the result of other underlying factors, such as pre-existing mental health problems, which "predispose some women both to have unwanted pregnancies and to have suicidal tendencies." The Eighth Circuit rejected this argument because it said that to render the advisory unconstitutionally misleading or irrelevant, Planned Parenthood would have to prove "that abortion has been ruled out, to a degree of scientifically accepted certainty, as a statistically significant causal factor in post-abortion suicides."

Planned Parenthood pointed to three main pieces of evidence to demonstrate that abortion was not considered a statistically significant factor in post-abortion suicides. First, Planned Parenthood pointed out that the label approved by the Food and Drug Administration ("FDA") for the abortion-inducing drug Mifeprex excluded suicide or suicide ideation as a risk of using the drug. Planned Parenthood argued that the absence of a suicide advisory from the FDA label for the drug was particularly significant given that the FDA requires drug labels to contain all "clinically significant adverse reactions" and "other potential safety hazards." The Eighth Circuit rejected this argument, claiming that FDA-approved labels do not represent a definitive or exclusive list of risks associated with a given drug. Second, Planned Parenthood noted that the American College of Obstetricians and Gynecologists ("ACOG") summarily rejected the claim that suicide and suicide ideation are known risks of abortion. The Eighth Circuit dismissed this point because it felt that there was insufficient information in the record regarding how ACOG came to this conclusion. Third, Planned Parenthood cited a report prepared by the American Psychological Association ("APA") that reviewed 50 published peer-reviewed papers analyzing empirical data regarding the psychological outcomes of those who had abortions as compared to those who did not. The APA identified methodological deficiencies in all of the studies that found that there was an increased mental health risk associated with abortion. The Eighth Circuit rejected the utility of this evidence because, although the APA report found that studies had yet to establish with certainty that abortion is a causal factor in post-abortion suicide, the report conversely did not prove that abortion was ruled out as a statistically significant causal factor in such suicides. The Eighth Circuit also went on to reject other publications in the record which the dissent had suggested eliminated uncertainty about the absence of the causal role of abortion in increasing the risk of suicide. The majority refused to give credence to these publications based on what it perceived to be methodological deficiencies in those studies.

Thus, the majority of the en banc Eighth Circuit concluded that although the record reflected medical and scientific uncertainty as to whether abortion was correlated with suicide, there was nothing in the record that proved that abortion had been entirely ruled out as a cause of suicide. Given that uncertainty, and since the majority read the record to suggest that the relative risk of suicide and suicide ideation was higher for women who abort as "compared to women in other relevant groups," the Eighth Circuit concluded that the state legislature was "in the best position to weigh the divergent results and come to a conclusion about the best way to protect its populace."

Thus, the Eighth Circuit held that "the suicide advisory present[ed] neither an undue burden on abortion rights nor a violation of physicians' free speech rights." The Court, therefore, reversed the district court's grant of summary judgment to Planned Parenthood as to S.D.C.L. § 34–23A–10.1(1)(e)(ii), directed that summary judgment be awarded to the State as to that provision, and vacated the permanent injunction that had precluded enforcement of that provision.

== Concurrences ==
=== Judge Loken's concurrence ===
Judge Loken wrote a brief concurrence in which he noted that he agreed with the dissent that the plain language of the statute regarding the medical risks disclosure "strongly suggest[ed] legislative intent to require that a physician make an untruthful, misleading causation disclosure." Nevertheless, Judge Loken joined the majority because he read the Eighth Circuit's decision as limiting the facial constitutionality of the statute to "only a disclosure as to relative risk that the physician can adapt to fit his or her professional opinion of the conflicting medical research" regarding abortion.

=== Judge Colloton's concurrence ===
Judge Colloton wrote a brief concurrence which almost exclusively endorsed the en banc panel's opinion. Judge Colloton's only disagreement with the majority opinion was that he found "it unnecessary to consider the meaning of the hypothetical phrase 'a description of all known medical risks of the procedure...to which the pregnant women would be subjected.'"

== Dissent ==
Judge Murphy wrote a dissent—joined by Judge Wollman, Judge Bye, and Judge Melloy—that sharply rebuked the majority opinion. The dissent maintained that the district court had correctly concluded that South Dakota's mandatory disclosure law was unconstitutional, arguing that the law "will not inform the free choice of a woman and is not consistent with the medical evidence."

The dissent characterized the majority as seeking "to avoid the constitutional problem created by the current statutory text" by claiming that the new statutory language—that is, the language challenged by Planned Parenthood in this case--"merely inform[s] women that their decision to have an abortion would 'cause[] [them] to become a member of a group' with a statistically higher rate of suicide." The dissent pointed out that this was a flawed argument for two reasons. First, the majority's reading was inconsistent with the plain language of the statute. Second, the medical evidence suggested that women sharing certain attributes might have a higher rate of suicide—not that abortion caused suicide. In fact, the dissenters argued that the vast majority of researchers maintain that there is no causal relationship between abortion and suicide.

The dissent focused, in part, on the changes made to the text of the South Dakota law. The dissenting judges argued that the statutory history should inform both the court's reading of the statute and the words contained therein. An earlier version of the law advised patients about the "particular medical risks associated with the particular abortion procedure to be employed, including when medically accurate, the risks of infection, hemorrhage, danger to subsequent pregnancies, and infertility." By contrast, the version of the statute which Planned Parenthood challenged in this case forced doctors to tell pregnant women that a greater likelihood of suicide and suicidal ideation is a "known medical risk" to which those women "would be subjected" by having an abortion. The dissent found the switch from "risks associated with" to "would be subjected [to]" dispositive as to the question of statutory intent; the statutory drafters meant the mandatory disclosure to convey casualty. This conclusion was supported by legislative findings.

The dissent described the majority as having devised a test wherein, so long as there could theoretically be a casual link between abortion and suicide, a suicide advisory like South Dakota's would be considered truthful, non-misleading, and relevant—unless, that is, a plaintiff could prove the absence of the causal link with "scientifically accepted certainty." The majority created this test, the dissenters explained, because it had already conceded that if the correlation between abortion and suicide were not due to a causal relationship, the suicide advisory would be misleading or irrelevant, and thus unconstitutional. The dissent then pointed out the critical flaw in the majority's approach: the vast majority of researchers insisted that there was no causal relationship between abortion and suicide.

To support its contention that the majority of researchers had concluded that abortion did not cause suicide, the dissent provided an overview of the extensive evidence in the record supporting that assertion. This evidence included the aforementioned APA report, ACOG's most recent edition of medical opinions, and statements from the author of two of the studies upon which the state and intervenors had relied wherein the author rejected the contention that his findings suggested that abortion caused suicide. The dissent also noted that the State's expert had had her abortion studies publicly discredited. The dissenting judges further pointed out that several of the other studies upon which the state and intervenors relied were ones that had been criticized for comparing pregnant women to a group "irrelevant to a pregnant woman's decision to have an abortion." The dissenters went on to observe that in the time since the district court enjoined the suicide advisory and an Eighth Circuit panel affirmed that decision, the United Kingdom's Royal College of Obstetricians and Gynaecologists ("RCOG") issued guidance that women "be informed that the evidence that suggests that they are no more or less likely to suffer adverse psychological sequelae whether they have an abortion or continue with the pregnancy and have the baby." RCOG based its conclusion on a number of studies that established that "post abortion suicide rates are linked to preexisting mental illness and domestic violence, not to the decision to undergo an abortion."

The dissenters maintained that the state's interest in this case—to promote a "wise," mature[,] and informed" decision by women considering abortion—was thwarted by the suicide advisory. The dissent argued that because the majority of medical research refutes the claim that abortion causes an increased risk of suicide, the state's failure to not inform a pregnant patient of that fact, compounded by its forcing doctors to tell the woman the opposite, hurt any valid interest the state might have and gravely undermined the constitutionality of the mandated advisory.

The dissenters went on to note that, since Planned Parenthood's challenge, the South Dakota legislature and governor had amended its state abortion regulations to be more in line with the predominant "view in the medical community that abortion does not cause mental health problems such as suicidal ideation and suicide." The new statutory language was consistent with the view that preexisting risk factors that may coincide with abortion were what led to an increased risk of suicide.

The dissent concluded by stating that "[b]y forcing doctors to inform women that abortion subjects them to a risk which the record medical evidence refutes, the suicide advisory places an undue burden on a pregnant woman's due process rights and violates a doctor's First Amendment right against compelled speech."

== Reception ==
Commentators have criticized the decision that the Eighth Circuit reached in this case. Some have criticized informed consent provisions like those at issue in Planned Parenthood v. Rounds for "not [being] scientifically sound and thus not 'truthful and nonmisleading.'" Others criticized the Eighth Circuit for legitimizing "a specific class of anti-abortion laws that are designed to 'unduly influence a woman's choice, in violation of the ethical boundaries of medical informed consent.'"

== Subsequent developments ==
More recently, the Supreme Court addressed a comparable issue in National Institute of Family and Life Advocates v. Becerra, 585 U.S. ___ (2018) (hereinafter "NIFLA"). In NIFLA, the Supreme Court addressed the constitutionality of California's Reproductive Freedom, Accountability, Comprehensive Care, and Transparency Act ("FACT Act"), which required crisis pregnancy centers to provide clients with certain disclosures, including that abortions were available at state-sponsored clinics. The Court ruled, in a 5–4 decision, that the notices required by the FACT Act violated the First Amendment because they constituted government-compelled speech that targeted particular speakers, a speech regulation for which the state lacked a sufficient compelling state interest.

The question of whether abortion providers are entitled to third-party standing to challenge abortion restrictions is currently up for Supreme Court consideration in June Medical Services, LLC v. Russo, Dkt no. 18–1323.

== See also ==
- National Institute of Family and Life Advocates v. Becerra, 585 U.S. ___ (2018).
- Planned Parenthood v. Casey, 505 U.S. 833 (1992).
- Roe v. Wade, 410 U.S. 113 (1973).
