= Whole Woman's Health v. Hellerstedt =

- Supreme Court of the United States

Argued March 2, 2016 Decided June 27, 2016
- Full case name: Whole Woman's Health; Austin Women's Health Center; Killeen Women's Health Center; Nova Health Systems d/b/a Reproductive Services; Sherwood C. Lynn, Jr., M.D.; Pamela J. Richter, D.O.; and Lendol L. Davis, M.D., on behalf of themselves and their patients, petitioners v. John Hellerstedt, M.D., Commissioner of the Texas Department of State Health Services; Mari Robinson, Executive Director of the Texas Medical Board, in their official capacities
- Docket no.: 15-274
- Citations: 579 U.S. 582 (more) 136 S. Ct. 2292; 195 L. Ed. 2d 665
- Argument: Oral argument
- Opinion announcement: Opinion announcement

Case history
- Prior: Injunction granted, 46 F. Supp. 3d 673, (W.D. Tex. 2014), staying injunction, 769 F.3d 285 (5th Cir.), vacated in part, 135 S. Ct. 399 (2014), aff’d in part, vacated in part, rev’d in part, 790 F.3d 563 (5th Cir.), mandate stayed pending judgment 135 S. Ct. 2923 (2015), cert. granted, 136 S. Ct. 499 (2015).

Holding
- Both the admitting-privileges and the surgical-center requirements place a substantial obstacle in the path of women seeking a pre-viability abortion, constitute an undue burden on abortion access, and thus violate the Constitution.

Court membership
- Chief Justice John Roberts Associate Justices Anthony Kennedy · Clarence Thomas; Ruth Bader Ginsburg · Stephen Breyer; Samuel Alito · Sonia Sotomayor; Elena Kagan

Case opinions
- Majority: Breyer, joined by Kennedy, Ginsburg, Sotomayor, Kagan
- Concurrence: Ginsburg
- Dissent: Thomas
- Dissent: Alito, joined by Roberts, Thomas

Laws applied
- U.S. Const. amend. XIV; Texas House Bill 2
- Superseded by
- Dobbs v. Jackson Women's Health Organization (2022)

Whole Woman's Health v. Hellerstedt, 579 U.S. 582 (2016), was a landmark decision of the United States Supreme Court announced on June 27, 2016. The Court ruled 5–3 that Texas cannot place restrictions on the delivery of abortion services that create an undue burden for women seeking an abortion. On June 28, 2016, the Supreme Court refused to hear challenges from Wisconsin and Mississippi where federal appeals courts had enjoined the enforcement of similar laws.

The decision in Hellerstedt has not been good law since the Supreme Court repudiated Roe v. Wade and the right to abortion in Dobbs v. Jackson Women's Health Organization, 597 U.S. 215 (2022).

== Background ==
In 2013, Texas passed a law, H.B. 2, placing a series of restrictions on abortion clinics within the state. In November 2013, one of H.B. 2's requirements that abortion providers have admitting privileges at a hospital within 30 miles took effect. In the time since the admitting privileges requirement took effect, the number of abortion clinics in Texas declined from 42 to 19.

The law also required abortion providers to meet the same standards as ambulatory surgical centers and to upgrade their building, safety, parking, and staffing to meet the standards of a hospital room. Whole Woman's Health, however, has deemed these requirements unnecessary and expensive as well as an attempt to limit abortion access rather than provide safety to women. This part of the law was enforced in Texas in the beginning of October 2014, but its enforcement was suspended pending the outcome of this case. Texas had waived some or all of the surgical-center requirements for 336 of the 433 (78%) licensed ambulatory surgical centers in Texas, but had not waived any part of the surgical-center requirements for any of the abortion clinics in the state.

=== First lawsuit ===
A group of plaintiffs including Whole Woman's Health sued, bringing a facial challenge to the admitting-privileges provision. On October 28, 2013, the day before the law was to take effect, Judge Earl Leroy Yeakel III of the United States District Court for the Western District of Texas in Austin, Texas granted the plaintiffs an injunction invalidating the provision.

Three days later, a motions panel of the United States Court of Appeals for the Fifth Circuit made of Circuit Judges Priscilla Richman, Jennifer Walker Elrod, and Catharina Haynes, granted an emergency stay of the injunction, allowing the law to go into effect. On November 19, 2013, the U.S. Supreme Court declined to vacate the stay, with Justice Scalia, joined by Justices Thomas and Alito, writing a concurrence and Justice Breyer, joined by Justices Ginsburg, Sotomayor and Kagan, writing a dissent. On March 27, 2014, Circuit Judge Edith Jones, joined by Judges Elrod and Haynes, upheld the challenged provision. Whole Woman's Health did not petition the U.S. Supreme Court for a writ of certiorari.

=== Second lawsuit ===
Whole Women's Health v. Hellerstedt 2014 order

On April 6, 2014, Whole Woman's Health filled a new lawsuit, now seeking to block the admitting-privileges provision as applied to the Whole Woman's Health in McAllen, Texas and the Nova Health Systems in El Paso, Texas, as well as to block the surgical centre provision throughout Texas. The court held a four-day bench trial and on August 29, 2014, Judge Yeakel issued a state-wide injunction barring enforcement of both provisions.

On October 2, 2014, Circuit Judge Elrod, joined by Judge Jerry Edwin Smith and with Stephen A. Higginson dissenting in part, stayed the lower court's injunction pending appeal. On October 14, 2014, the U.S. Supreme Court vacated the Fifth Circuit, reimposing the injunction blocking the law, over a dissent by Justices Scalia, Thomas, and Alito. On June 9, 2015, Circuit Judges Edward C. Prado, Elrod, and Haynes, in an anonymous per curiam decision, found on the merits that the two provisions were constitutional.

The Fifth Circuit reversed the court order protecting the El Paso clinic but upheld the order protecting the McAllen clinic. The three-judge panel upheld the majority of the Texas law. (Note: When the Fifth Circuit issued its decision, the caption of the case was Whole Woman's Health v. Cole. The name of the defendants was later changed to "John Hellerstedt, Commissioner, Texas Department of State Health Services, et al." when Hellerstedt assumed the role of Commissioner of the Texas Department of State Health Services.) The panel held that the law was constitutional under Planned Parenthood v. Casey's undue burden standard because the law "does not place a substantial obstacle in path of those women seeking an abortion".

== Supreme Court ==
Before H.B. 2 could take effect, the petitioners requested a stay from the Supreme Court. On June 29, 2015, the court granted a temporary stay by a 5–4 vote, and it later granted an indefinite stay. Chief Justice John Roberts and Justices Antonin Scalia, Clarence Thomas, and Samuel Alito would have denied the stay. On November 13, 2015, the court granted a writ of certiorari to review the Fifth Circuit's holding. Over eighty amicus curiae briefs were filed with the Court, including one signed by prominent female lawyers stating that they had each had an abortion and the decision had paved the way for their legal careers. A competing brief in support of the Texas law was filed on behalf of women who said they suffered psychological or physical harm due to their abortions. On February 13, 2016, Justice Scalia died, leaving eight justices to hear the case. Ninety minutes of oral arguments were heard on March 2, 2016, with Scott A. Keller, the Solicitor General of Texas, appearing for the state, Stephanie Toti of the Center for Reproductive Rights appearing for Whole Woman's Health, and Donald B. Verrilli Jr., the Solicitor General of the United States, appearing as a friend of the court in support of the clinic.

During the questioning phase of the oral arguments, the liberal side of the court, including Justices Ruth Bader Ginsburg, Stephen Breyer, Sonia Sotomayor, and Elena Kagan, questioned the true intention of the law and Texas's justification for it. Texas Solicitor General Scott Keller argued that women living far from Texas abortion clinics––due to the closure of many abortion clinics struggling to comply with the requirement's standards––were not unduly burdened in gaining access to abortions because they could access clinics in New Mexico, a state with more lenient standards. In response, Justice Ginsburg noted: "So if your argument is right, then New Mexico is not an available way out for Texas, because Texas says: To protect our women, we need these things. But send them off to New Mexico... and that's perfectly all right."

=== Opinion of the Court ===
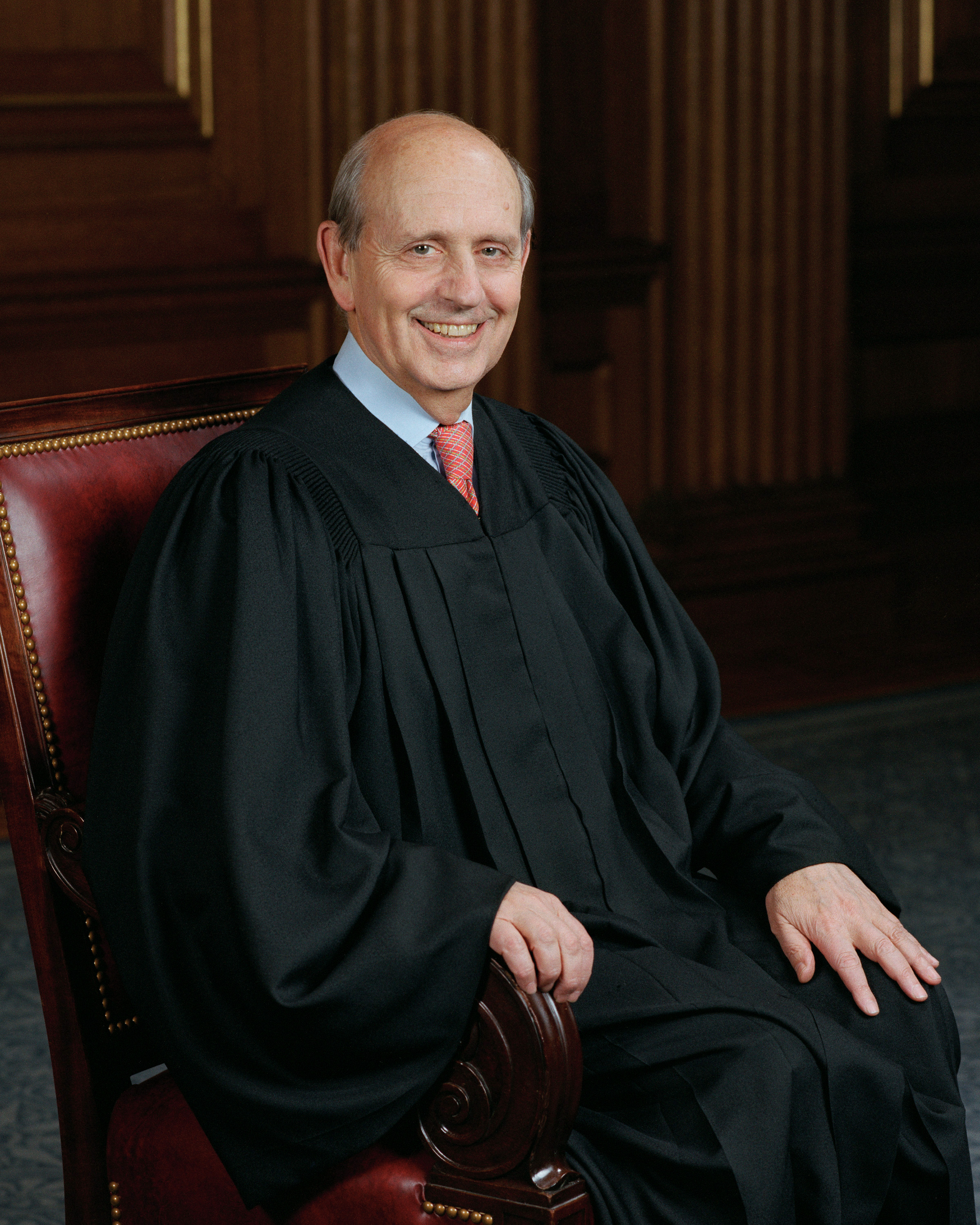
Justice Stephen Breyer was the author of the Court's opinion.

On June 27, 2016, the Court ruled by a 5–3 vote that Texas cannot place restrictions on the delivery of abortion services that create an undue burden for women seeking an abortion, and therefore the sections of Texas law H.B. 2 challenged here are invalid. In an opinion written by Justice Stephen Breyer, the court struck down key provisions of the law––those requiring doctors who perform abortions to have difficult-to-obtain "admitting privileges" at a local hospital and requiring clinics to have costly hospital-grade facilities––as violating a woman's right to an abortion. Observing that these provisions do not offer medical benefits sufficient to justify the burdens upon access that each imposes, the majority concluded: "Each places a substantial obstacle in the path of women seeking a pre-viability abortion, each constitutes an undue burden on abortion access, and each violates the federal Constitution." The majority opinion struck down both provisions "facially", that is, the very words of the provisions are invalid, irrespective of how they might be implemented or applied. According to the ruling, the task of judging whether a law puts an unconstitutional burden on a woman's right to abortion rests with the courts and not the legislatures.

Justice Breyer wrote, "We have found nothing in Texas’ record evidence that shows that, compared to prior law (which required a “working arrangement” with a doctor with admitting privileges), the new law advanced Texas’ legitimate interest in protecting women's health." He noted that, when asked at oral argument whether Texas knew of a single instance in which the new requirement would have helped even one woman obtain better treatment, Texas admitted that there was no evidence in the record of such a case. He found that, if H.B. 2 were allowed to take full effect, the number of Texan women living more than 200 miles from the nearest abortion clinic would increase from 10,000 to 750,000.

Justice Breyer dismissed the state's claim that the Pennsylvania case of Kermit Gosnell justified additional regulation: "Gosnell's behavior was terribly wrong. But there is no reason to believe that an extra layer of regulation would have affected that behavior. Determined wrongdoers, already ignoring existing statutes and safety measures, are unlikely to be convinced to adopt safe practices by a new overlay of regulations. Regardless, Gosnell's deplorable crimes could escape detection only because his facility went un-inspected for more than 15 years. Pre-existing Texas law already contained numerous detailed regulations covering abortion facilities, including a requirement that facilities be inspected at least annually."

=== Concurrence ===
In a two-page concurrence, Justice Ginsburg wrote, "Many medical procedures, including childbirth, are far more dangerous to patients, yet are not subject to ambulatory surgical-center or hospital admitting-privileges requirements. ... Given those realities, it is beyond rational belief that H. B. 2 could genuinely protect the health of women, and certain that the law 'would simply make it more difficult for them to obtain abortions.' ... When a State severely limits access to safe and legal procedures, women in desperate circumstances may resort to unlicensed rogue practitioners. ... [L]aws like H. B. 2 that 'do little or nothing for health, but rather strew impediments to abortion' cannot survive judicial inspection."

=== Dissents ===
Justice Thomas filed a dissenting opinion, stating that the majority "reimagines the undue-burden standard" for abortion access, creating a "benefits-and-burdens balancing test" that courts should have instead deferred to the legislatures to resolve. Justice Alito, joined by Chief Justice Roberts and Justice Thomas, filed a second dissenting opinion, arguing that there is no direct causal link between the Texas law and the closings of abortion clinics, and they may have also been affected by the withdrawal of state funds, declining demand for abortions, and retirements of doctors. Alito also stated that Texas might well have been motivated to protect women by the Kermit Gosnell case in Pennsylvania, in which a doctor had been convicted on three charges of murder and one of manslaughter.

== Subsequent developments ==
=== Reception ===
Former U.S. Secretary of State Hillary Clinton praised the decision as a victory for women, saying "By striking down politically motivated restrictions that made it nearly impossible for Texans to exercise their full reproductive rights, the Court upheld every woman’s right to safe, legal abortion, no matter where she lives." President Obama issued a statement applauding the Court's decision and reiterating his commitment to "women's health, including protecting a woman's access to safe, affordable health care and her right to determine her own future." Senator Bernie Sanders applauded the decision, calling it a "decisive victory for women across the country."

Senator Ted Cruz expressed disappointment with the ruling, saying "the Supreme Court sided with abortion extremists who care more about providing abortion-on-demand than they do protecting women’s health." He also vowed to fight for "unborn life."

A statement issued on behalf of the Catholic Church bishops in Texas said the decision "puts women at grave risk" because "Surgical abortion is an invasive procedure that poses numerous and serious medical complications. The state has a legitimate interest in ensuring the maximum level of safety for the woman subjected to the procedure and that viable emergency care is available if complications such as hemorrhage, infection, uterine perforation, blood clots, cervical tears, or allergic reactions occur. It is irresponsible for physicians to perform this procedure without being able to provide follow-up treatment for the associated complications."

The decision may impact similar restrictions on abortion access in other states. Steve Vladeck, a professor of law at American University Washington College of Law, stated:

By clarifying exactly what the 'undue burden' test requires, I suspect the majority was hoping to dissuade states like Oklahoma from continuing to pass laws that so directly challenge the central premise of Roe v. Wade -- that the Constitution protects a pregnant woman's right to an abortion in a meaningful percentage of cases,

Vladeck also added that

in the process, the Court today has called into question everything from categorical bans on abortions to so-called 'fetal heartbeat' restrictions, and perhaps plenty of other laws in between,

=== Other cases ===
At the time of the decision, five states required abortion clinics to operate under "hospital-like" standards: Michigan, Missouri, Pennsylvania, Virginia, and Tennessee, though in the last of these a court order prevented enforcement. Nine states required doctors to have hospital admitting privileges, of which three were enforcing that requirement (North Dakota, Missouri, and Tennessee) and six were not (Wisconsin, Kansas, Oklahoma, Louisiana, Mississippi, and Alabama).

A few hours after the Supreme Court announced its ruling, Alabama Attorney General Luther Strange announced he would drop his appeal of a U.S. District Court ruling that had invalidated the state's hospital admitting privileges requirement for abortion providers. On June 28, 2016, the Supreme Court declined appeals in related cases from Wisconsin and Mississippi. It let stand a ruling that the state of Washington can require pharmacists to fill prescriptions for contraceptives to which they have religious objections. Justice Alito, in a dissent joined by Chief Justice Roberts and Justice Thomas, wrote: "If this is a sign of how religious liberty claims will be treated in the years ahead, those who value religious freedom have cause for great concern." The court also rejected appeals by Mississippi and Wisconsin that sought to require abortion providers to have hospital admitting privileges.

Louisiana had passed Act 620 in 2014, modeled after Texas' law that would require doctors to have admission privileges at a hospital within 30 miles, effectively reducing the number of legal clinics to one at the time of passage. The law was challenged by abortion clinics and doctors in June Medical Services, LLC v. Russo, and while the District Court ordered an injunction to prevent the law going into effect, the Fifth Circuit reversed the injunction. The plaintiffs obtained an emergency stay of the Fifth Circuit's decision from the Supreme Court while Whole Woman's Health was under litigation. Following this case's decision, the Louisiana law was declared unconstitutional by the District Court on rehearing on the basis of Whole Woman's Health, but the Fifth Circuit again reversed the decision. Plaintiffs have again sought an emergency stay order from the Supreme Court. On February 7, 2019, the United States Supreme Court granted a stay and temporarily enjoined the state of Louisiana from enforcing the law while the plaintiffs appeal the decision of the Fifth Circuit. The Supreme Court ruled on June 29, 2020 that the Louisiana law was similarly unconstitutional, with Roberts as the deciding vote. Roberts maintained his position of dissent in the opinion of the court but upheld the judgement of unconstitutionality as found in Whole Woman's Health as a matter of past court precedent.

== See also ==
- Dobbs v. Jackson Women's Health Organization (2022)
- Roe v. Wade (1973)
- Planned Parenthood v. Casey (1992)
- Stenberg v. Carhart (2000)
- Gonzales v. Carhart (2007)
- June Medical Services, LLC v. Russo (2020)
- Hyde Amendment
