= Periods for Politicians =

Periods for Politicians (originally Periods for Pence) is a campaign launched by the women of Indiana in response to a controversial abortion bill passed by Republican Mike Pence, the fiftieth governor of Indiana, in March 2016. The campaign encourages women to send emails, tweets and phone calls to the governor's office reporting the progression of their menstrual cycles. The group's Facebook page was created March 28 of 2016. The final post on Facebook confirming the page was being archived was on February 28 20025 due to inactivity and also the loss of the founders husband.

== Background ==
Pence, a self declared "Christian, a conservative, and a republican in that order", signed House Enrolled Act 1337 into law in March 2016 to go into effect July 1 of 2016. Pence described the law as "a comprehensive pro-life measure that affirms the value of all human life." The bill added provisions to Indiana's previously existing abortion laws. HEA 1337 of Indiana forbids a person from getting an abortion on the basis of race, color, national origin, ancestry, or sex of the fetus. It is also illegal for a woman to seek an abortion based on a diagnosis or potential diagnosis of the fetus having Down syndrome or any other disability.

With the passing of this bill, Indiana joined North Dakota as the second state to ban abortion on the grounds of fetal anomaly. Women who have conceived children fostering fetal defects may be forced to continue with complicated, high-risk pregnancies. The bill allows for doctors to be sued for terminating pregnancies following these diagnoses. Doctors at abortion clinics will have to obtain admitting privileges at nearby hospitals. An admitting privilege is the right of a doctor to admit patients to a hospital for medical treatment. Some hospitals, however, are unwilling to grant admitting privileges to abortion providers, may result in the closing of clinics (only 4 of 92 counties in Indiana have abortion clinics). Lastly, the bill states that fetal tissue from both abortions and miscarriages must be either cremated or buried.

== Periods for Pence ==
The residents of Indiana responded in a campaign that became known as "Periods for Pence". A Facebook page was created anonymously on March 28 urging women from all over the state to send in emails, tweets, and phone calls to the governor's office reporting the progression of their menstrual flow, cramps, birth control, tampon discomfort, bloating, and even menopausal advancements.

The organizer of the Facebook page emphasized a specific aspect of the law, forcing miscarried fetuses and aborted fetuses to be "interred or cremated by a facility having possession of the remains," regardless of the age of the fetus. In response to this, the organizer posted:

Fertilized eggs can be expelled during a woman's period without a woman even knowing that she might have had the potential blastocyst in her. Therefore, any period could potentially be a miscarriage without knowledge. I would certainly hate for any of my fellow Hoosier women to be at risk of penalty if they do not 'properly dispose' of this or report it. Just to cover our bases, perhaps we should make sure to contact Governor Pence's office to report our periods. We wouldn't want him thinking that THOUSANDS OF HOOSIER WOMEN A DAY are trying to hide anything, would we?

Following this first post on Facebook, thousands of women commented about the progression of their menstrual cycles. The page publicly shared the phone number of Governor Pence's office for the usage of any fans of the page. As of November 2016, the page had more than 70,000 likes.

== Pence and the vice presidential campaign ==
Pence, who served in the United States House of Representatives for 12 years prior to his one term as governor of Indiana, was running for reelection when he resigned to focus his energy on running as Donald Trump's vice presidential nominee. Since the announcement, the page has gained more media attention and has targeted other politicians and the Trump-Pence presidential campaign. The page changed the name to "Periods for Politicians" to include other politicians who its members view as particularly harsh when it comes to anti-abortion laws and women's rights, such as Republican Indiana State Representative Casey Cox, who authored the original bill.
