= O&G =

O&G may refer to:

- Obstetrics and gynaecology, surgical specialties dealing with the female reproductive organs
- Obstetrics & Gynecology (journal), a scientific journal of the American College of Obstetricians and Gynecologists
- O&G (magazine), a magazine published by the Royal Australian and New Zealand College of Obstetricians and Gynaecologists
- Oil and gas, hydrocarbons extracted from the subsurface
