= Obstetrics & Gynecology (journal) =

- Discipline: Obstetrics, gynecology
- Language: English
- Edited by: Jason D. Wright, MD

Publication details
- History: 1953-present
- Publisher: Lippincott Williams & Wilkins on behalf of the American College of Obstetricians and Gynecologists (United States)
- Frequency: Monthly
- Impact factor: 4.982 (2017)

Standard abbreviations
- ISO 4: Obstet. Gynecol.

Indexing
- CODEN: OBGNAS
- ISSN: 0029-7844 (print); 1873-233X (web)
- OCLC no.: 01643950

Links
- Journal homepage; Online archive

Obstetrics & Gynecology is a peer-reviewed medical journal in the field of obstetrics and gynecology. It is the official publication of the American College of Obstetricians and Gynecologists. It is popularly known as the "Green Journal".

Obstetrics & Gynecology has approximately 45,000 subscribers. According to the 2014 Journal Citation Reports, it had an impact factor of 4.982, ranking it 5th among 82 reproductive medicine journals.
