= Undue burden standard =

Legal standard in the United States

The undue burden standard is a constitutional test fashioned by the Supreme Court of the United States. The test, first developed in the late 20th century, is widely used in American constitutional law. In short, the undue burden standard states that a legislature cannot make a particular law that is too burdensome or restrictive of one's fundamental rights.

== Historical examples ==
One use of the standard was in Morgan v. Virginia, 328 U.S. 373 (1946). In a 7-to-1 ruling, Associate Justice Stanley Forman Reed fashioned an "undue burden" test to decide the constitutionality of a Virginia law requiring separate but equal racial segregation in public transportation. "There is a recognized abstract principle, however, that may be taken as a postulate for testing whether particular state legislation in the absence of action by Congress is beyond state power. This is that the state legislation is invalid if it unduly burdens that commerce in matters where uniformity is necessary—necessary in the constitutional sense of useful in accomplishing a permitted purpose."

More recently, the standard has been used in cases involving state restrictions on a woman's access to abortion. The standard was applied by Associate Justice Sandra Day O'Connor in her dissent in City of Akron v. Akron Center for Reproductive Health, 462 US 416 (1983). O'Connor utilized the test as an alternative to the strict scrutiny test applied in Roe v. Wade, 410 U.S. 113 (1973). The test was later used by a plurality opinion in Planned Parenthood v. Casey, 505 U.S. 833 (1992), to uphold state regulations on abortion. In City of Akron, O'Connor stated: "If the particular regulation does not 'unduly burden' the fundamental right, then our evaluation of that regulation is limited to our determination that the regulation rationally relates to a legitimate state purpose." Justice John Paul Stevens in his partial concurrence, partial dissent to Casey further defined undue burden by saying, "[a] burden may be 'undue' either because [it] is too severe or because it lacks a legitimate, rational justification."

== Test usage ==
The undue burden test has been used to judge the constitutionality of tax laws, consumer product liability laws, affirmative action, voter registration laws, abortion laws, and even anti-spam laws.

Some courts have described the undue burden standard as "a 'middle way' forward" for Constitutional analysis, between the strict scrutiny and the rational basis tests.
