= Thornburgh v. American College of Obstetricians & Gynecologists =

Thornburgh v. American College of Obstetricians and Gynecologists
- Supreme Court of the United States

Argued November 5, 1985 Decided June 11, 1986
- Full case name: Thornburgh, Governor of Pennsylvania, et al. v. American College of Obstetricians and Gynecologists, et al.
- Citations: 476 U.S. 747 (more) 106 S. Ct. 2169; 90 L. Ed. 2d 779; 54 U.S.L.W. 4618; 1986 U.S. LEXIS 54

Case history
- Prior: 737 F.2d 283 (3d Cir. 1984 (affirmed)

Holding
- Provisions of the Pennsylvania Abortion Control Act of 1982 that "wholly subordinate constitutional privacy interests and concerns with maternal health to the effort to deter a woman from making a decision that, with her physician, is hers to make" were unconstitutional.

Court membership
- Chief Justice Warren E. Burger Associate Justices William J. Brennan Jr. · Byron White; Thurgood Marshall · Harry Blackmun; Lewis F. Powell Jr. · William Rehnquist; John P. Stevens · Sandra Day O'Connor

Case opinions
- Majority: Blackmun, joined by Brennan, Marshall, Powell, Stevens
- Concurrence: Stevens
- Dissent: Burger
- Dissent: White, joined by Rehnquist
- Dissent: O'Connor, joined by Rehnquist

Laws applied
- U.S. Const. amend. XIV
- Overruled by
- Planned Parenthood v. Casey (1992)

Thornburgh v. American College of Obstetricians and Gynecologists, 476 U.S. 747 (1986), was a United States Supreme Court case involving a challenge to Pennsylvania's Abortion Control Act of 1982.

== Decision ==
In 1982, Pennsylvania passed the Abortion Control Act, which imposed a 24-hour waiting period and required that prospective patients be provided with information (such as the probable stage of the patient's pregnancy, the availability of child welfare benefits, and the possibility of receiving child support from the patient's sexual partner) as part of the "informed consent" process prior to all abortion procedures. The American College of Obstetricians and Gynecologists filed suit in the Eastern District of Pennsylvania seeking an injunction to prevent the law from being enforced on constitutional grounds. The district court denied the plaintiffs' request for injunctive relief and the plaintiffs appealed to the Third Circuit Court of Appeals. The Third Circuit then reversed and enjoined enforcement of the Act. Pennsylvania then appealed to the Supreme Court which granted review.

In a 5–4 decision, the Supreme Court affirmed the Third Circuit's decision to enjoin enforcement of the Act. Justice Harry Blackmun, writing for the majority, held that the Act's requirement of providing information to the patient as part of the "informed consent" process "seem[s] to us to be nothing less than an outright attempt to wedge the Commonwealth's message discouraging abortion into the privacy of the informed-consent dialogue between the woman and her physician."

Justice Sandra Day O'Connor distanced herself from the court in dissent, "disput[ing] not only the wisdom but also the legitimacy of the Court's attempt to discredit and pre-empt state abortion regulation regardless of the interests it serves and the impact it has."

== See also ==
- List of United States Supreme Court cases, volume 476
- List of United States Supreme Court cases
- Lists of United States Supreme Court cases by volume
- List of United States Supreme Court cases by the Burger Court
