= Admitting privileges =

Privilege of a doctor to admit patients to medical treatment center

An admitting privilege is the right of a doctor to admit patients to a hospital for medical treatment without first having to go through an emergency department. This is generally restricted to doctors on the hospital staff, although in some countries such as Canada and the United States, both general practitioners and specialists can have admitting privileges. The practice of credentialing physicians who do not work at a particular hospital to admit has been steadily declining, and as of 2022, is essentially non-existent in many areas.

Admitting privileges have been used as precedent to impede abortion providers in several U.S. states, including Louisiana, Mississippi, Wisconsin, and Texas. This means the doctor is unable to provide an abortion to a patient unless that doctor has admitting privileges, regardless of where the procedure occurs. Supporters of these laws claim that patients should have access to a hospital in case of complications. The American College of Obstetricians and Gynecologists considers requiring admitting privileges for abortions to be unnecessary given that "[i]n 2019, the Centers for Medicare & Medicaid Services removed its requirement that ambulatory surgical centers participating in Medicaid and Medicare have hospital admitting privileges, asserting they were unnecessary in the promotion of patient health, an inefficient use of health care dollars, and an administrative barrier to efficient operations". The U.S. Supreme Court ruled in June Medical Services, LLC v. Russo, that some restrictions based on admitting privileges were unconstitutional.

== See also ==
- Hospital admission
