= City of Akron v. Akron Center for Reproductive Health =

- Supreme Court of the United States

Argued November 30, 1982 Decided June 15, 1983
- Full case name: City of Akron v. Akron Center for Reproductive Health, et al.
- Citations: 462 U.S. 416 (more) 103 S. Ct. 2481; 76 L. Ed. 2d 687

Case history
- Prior: Akron Ctr. for Reproductive Health, Inc. v. City of Akron, 479 F. Supp. 1172 (N.D. Ohio 1979); affirmed in part, reversed in part, 651 F.2d 1198 (6th Cir. 1981); cert. granted, 456 U.S. 988 (1982).

Holding
- The then-current abortion law of Akron, Ohio, which included a 24-hour waiting period and the requirement that a doctor inform the patient of the stage of fetal development, the supposed health risks of abortion, and the availability of adoption and childbirth resources, was unconstitutional.

Court membership
- Chief Justice Warren E. Burger Associate Justices William J. Brennan Jr. · Byron White; Thurgood Marshall · Harry Blackmun; Lewis F. Powell Jr. · William Rehnquist; John P. Stevens · Sandra Day O'Connor

Case opinions
- Majority: Powell, joined by Burger, Brennan, Marshall, Blackmun, Stevens
- Dissent: O'Connor, joined by White, Rehnquist

Laws applied
- U.S. Const. amend. XIV; Akron Codified Ordinances, ch. 1870, § 1870.03, § 1870.05, § 1870.06, § 1870.07, § 1870.16 (Akron Ordinance No. 160-1978)
- Overruled by
- Planned Parenthood v. Casey (1992)

City of Akron v. Akron Center for Reproductive Health, 462 U.S. 416 (1983), was a case in which the United States Supreme Court affirmed its abortion rights jurisprudence. In a majority opinion by Lewis F. Powell Jr., the Court struck down several provisions of an abortion law of Akron, Ohio, including portions found to be unconstitutionally vague.

== Ruling ==
=== Hospital requirement ===
One provision of the statute required abortions after the first trimester to be performed in a hospital. The Court found that to be unconstitutional. The state has a compelling interest in regulating abortion after the first trimester, but accepted medical practice does not recommend for all second-trimester abortions to be performed in a hospital. The regulation imposed an unnecessary burden that has the effect of infringing upon the constitutional right to an abortion.

=== Prohibition on unmarried minors ===
Another provision stated that a physician may not perform an abortion on an unmarried minor under 15 years old without obtaining either consent from one of her parents or a judicial bypass. The Court likewise struck down the provision, as the law and the Ohio courts provided no suitable mechanism for a minor to gain a judicial bypass, as the relevant laws and courts concerning juveniles did not mention abortion or establish the authority to determine the maturity or emancipation of a minor.

=== Information requirements ===
The statute also stated that before performing an abortion, the physician must inform the patient of the status of the pregnancy, stage of fetal development, expected date of viability, health risks of abortion, and the availability of adoption agencies and childbirth resources. The Court found the provision to be unconstitutional, as the script, ostensibly provided to ensure informed consent, was found to be geared towards influencing the patient to decide against an abortion.

The state may not attempt to influence the patient's choice between abortion and childbirth. The Ohio regulation extends the state's interest in informed consent beyond permissible limits, interfering with the discretion of the physician and placing unreasonable obstacles in his path.

- The requirement for doctors to tell patients that the fetus is "a human life from the moment of conception" also violates the provision in Roe v. Wade that "a State may not adopt one theory of when life begins to justify its regulation of abortions."
- The detailed description of the fetus that doctors are required to provide is speculative.
- The list of risks of abortion that the doctor is required to provide is "intended to suggest that abortion is a particularly dangerous procedure" and also overrides the physician's judgment, as he must tell his patient specific risks even if they do not apply to that patient.

=== 24-hour waiting period ===
Another provision mandated a 24-hour waiting period after the patient signs a consent form. The Court struck the provision down, as no state interest is served by the imposition of an "arbitrary and inflexible" waiting period.

=== Disposal requirements ===
The final challenged provision required physicians to ensure that fetal remains are disposed of in a "humane and sanitary manner." The majority deemed that to be unconstitutional, as criminal sanctions are imposed upon doctors who break the law, but "humane" was unconstitutionally vague and so a violation of due process. Rather than strike down "humane" and preserve "sanitary," the Court struck down the entire provision.

== Dissent ==
In her dissenting opinion, Sandra Day O'Connor, joined by Byron White and William Rehnquist, urged "the 'unduly burdensome' standard" from two prior cases, Maher v. Roe (1977) and Bellotti v. Baird (1979) to "be applied to the challenged regulations throughout the entire pregnancy without reference to the particular 'stage' of pregnancy involved." The "undue burden" test was later to gain acceptance by a plurality of the Court in Planned Parenthood v. Casey (1992), which replaced the earlier "strict scrutiny" standard of review of abortion regulations with the lesser "undue burden" standard, a standard which remained in effect until the ruling in Dobbs v. Jackson Women's Health Organization in 2022.

== See also ==
- List of United States Supreme Court cases, volume 462
