= American College of Obstetricians and Gynecologists =

US professional association

American College of Obstetricians and Gynecologists (ACOG)

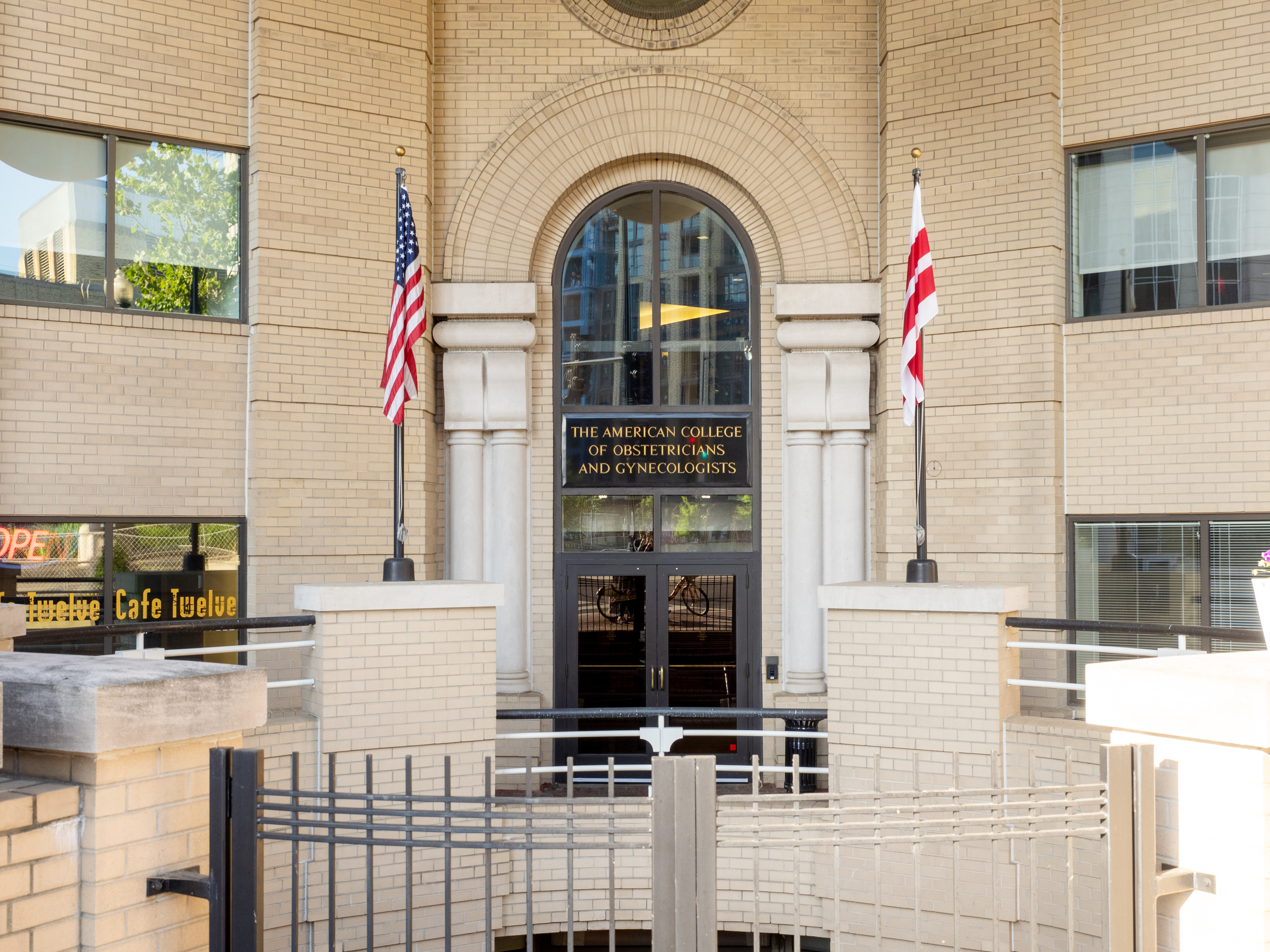
- Headquarters in Washington, D.C.
- Formation: 1951; 75 years ago
- Headquarters: 409 12th St SW, Washington, DC 20024
- Products: Obstetrics & Gynecology
- Website: www.acog.org

The American College of Obstetricians and Gynecologists (ACOG) is a professional association of physicians specializing in obstetrics and gynecology in the United States. Several Latin American countries are also represented within Districts of the organization. It is a 501(c)(6) organization with a membership of more than 60,000 obstetrician-gynecologists and women's health care professionals. It was founded in 1951.

== Background ==
A companion 501(c)(6) organization, the American Congress of Obstetricians and Gynecologists, was founded in 2008 and became operational in 2010. The two organizations coexist, and member individuals automatically belong to both. Both are not-for-profit. The College as a 501(c)(3) focuses on education (with limited political work), whereas the Congress as a 501(c)(6) is allowed to advocate for members' interests in terms of the business of medicine (BOM) through lobbying and other political work. Their main advocacy focuses on women's reproductive health, specifically opposing political interference in abortion access. Physician members are referred to as fellows and use the post-nominal letters FACOG to indicate their status. To become a fellow, a candidate must become certified by the American Board of Obstetrics and Gynecology, an independent organization, and then nominated to the College by another fellow. Non-OBGyn professionals may join as an Allied Health Professional, but must meet their standards of education.

Obstetrics & Gynecology is the official publication of ACOG. It is popularly known as "The Green Journal". In 1986, the organization successfully challenged an anti-abortion law in Pennsylvania before the U.S. Supreme Court in Thornburgh v. American College of Obstetricians and Gynecologists.

== Districts and sections ==
=== North America ===
==== United States ====
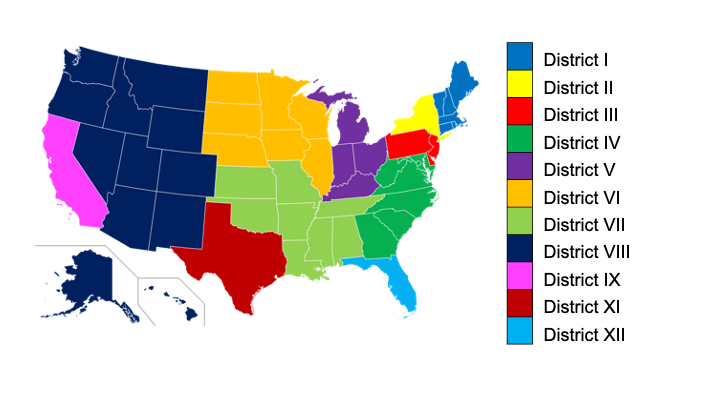
ACOG District Map of the United States

ACOG Districts in the United States
District	Member States
I	Connecticut, Maine, Massachusetts, New Hampshire, Rhode Island, Vermont
II	New York
III	Delaware, New Jersey, Pennsylvania
IV	District of Columbia, Georgia, Maryland, North Carolina, South Carolina, Virginia, West Virginia
V	Indiana, Kentucky, Ohio, Michigan
VI	Illinois, Iowa, Minnesota, Nebraska, North Dakota, South Dakota, Wisconsin
VII	Alabama, Arkansas, Kansas, Louisiana, Mississippi, Missouri, Oklahoma, Tennessee
VIII	Alaska, Arizona, Colorado, Hawaii, Idaho, Montana, Nevada, New Mexico, Oregon, Utah, Washington, Wyoming
IX	California
AFD^{1}	Air Force, Army, Navy
XI	Texas
XII	Florida
^{1}Armed Forces District (AFD)

==== Canada ====
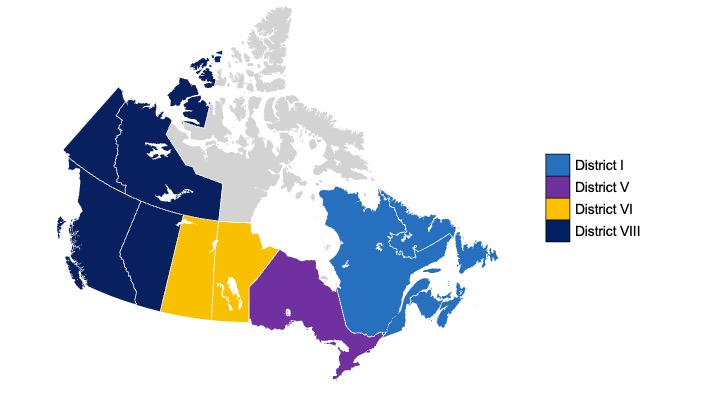
ACOG District Map of Canada

ACOG Districts by Canadian Provinces
District	Member Provinces
I	New Brunswick, Newfoundland and Labrador, Nova Scotia, Prince Edward Island, Quebec
V	Ontario
VI	Manitoba, Saskatchewan
VIII	Alberta, British Columbia, Northwest Territory, Yukon Territory

=== South America ===
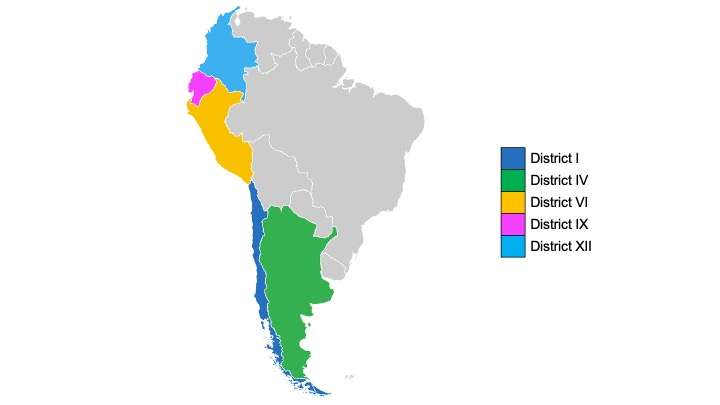
ACOG District Map of South America

ACOG Districts by South American Countries
District	Member Country
I	Chile
IV	Argentina
VI	Peru
IX	Ecuador
XII	Colombia
