= Planned Parenthood v. Casey =

1992 U.S. Supreme Court case on abortion

- Supreme Court of the United States

Argued April 22, 1992 Decided June 29, 1992
- Full case name: Planned Parenthood of Southeastern Pennsylvania, et al. v. Robert P. Casey, et al.
- Citations: 505 U.S. 833 (more) 112 S. Ct. 2791; 120 L. Ed. 2d 674; 1992 U.S. LEXIS 4751; 60 U.S.L.W. 4795; 92 Daily Journal DAR 8982; 6 Fla. L. Weekly Fed. S 663
- Argument: Oral argument
- Opinion announcement: Opinion announcement
- Decision: Opinion

Case history
- Prior: Judgment and injunction for plaintiffs granted, 686 F. Supp. 1089 (E.D. Pa. 1988).; Injunction clarified, 736 F. Supp. 633 (E.D. Pa. 1990).; Judgment and injunction granted for plaintiffs, 744 F. Supp. 1323 (E.D. Pa. 1990) (regarding 1988 amendments to 1982 Act).; Affirmed in part and reversed in part, 947 F. 2d 682 (3d Cir. 1991).; Petition and cross-petition for certiorari granted, 502 U.S. 1056 (1992)
- Subsequent: Remanded, 978 F.2d 74 (3d Cir. 1992).; Motion to disqualify judge denied, 812 F. Supp. 541 (E.D. Pa. 1993).; Record reopened and injunctions continued, 822 F. Supp. 227 (E.D. Pa. 1993).; Reversed and remanded, 14 F.3d 848 (3d Cir. 1994).; Stay denied, 510 U.S. 1309 (1994).; Attorney fees and costs awarded to plaintiffs, 869 F. Supp. 1190 (E.D. Pa. 1994).; Affirmed, 60 F.3d 816 (3d Cir. 1995)

Questions presented
- 1. Did the Court of Appeals err in upholding the constitutionality of the following provisions of the Pennsylvania Abortion Control Act: a. 18 Pa. Cons. Stat. § 3203 (1990) (definition of medical emergency) b. 18 Pa. Cons. Stat. § 3205 (1990) (informed consent) c. 18 Pa. Cons. Stat. § 3206 (1990) (parental consent) d. 18 Pa. Cons. Stat. §§ 3207 and 3214 (1990) (reporting requirements)?: 2. Did the Court of Appeals err in holding 18 Pa. Cons. Stat. § 3209 (1990) (spousal notice) unconstitutional?

Holding
- 1. Consideration of the fundamental constitutional question resolved by Roe v. Wade, principles of institutional integrity, and the rule of stare decisis require that Roe’s essential holding be reaffirmed.; 2. The Pennsylvania law that required spousal awareness prior to obtaining an abortion was invalid under the Fourteenth Amendment because it created an undue burden on married women seeking an abortion.; 3. Requirements for parental consent, informed consent, and 24-hour waiting period were constitutionally valid regulations.; Third Circuit Court of Appeals affirmed in part and reversed in part.

Court membership
- Chief Justice William Rehnquist Associate Justices Byron White · Harry Blackmun; John P. Stevens · Sandra Day O'Connor; Antonin Scalia · Anthony Kennedy; David Souter · Clarence Thomas

Case opinions
- Majority: O'Connor, Kennedy, and Souter (Parts I, II, III, V-A, V-C, and VI), joined by Blackmun and Stevens
- Plurality: O'Connor, Kennedy, and Souter (Part V-E), joined by Stevens
- Plurality: O'Connor, Kennedy, and Souter (Parts IV, V-B, and V-D)
- Concur/dissent: Stevens
- Concur/dissent: Blackmun
- Concur/dissent: Rehnquist, joined by White, Scalia, and Thomas
- Concur/dissent: Scalia, joined by Rehnquist, White, and Thomas

Laws applied
- U.S. Const. amends. V, XIV; 18 Pa. Cons. Stat. §§ 3203, 3205–09, 3214 (Pennsylvania Abortion Control Act of 1982)
- Overruled by
- Dobbs v. Jackson Women's Health Organization (2022)
- This case overturned a previous ruling or rulings
- Roe v. Wade (1973) (in part); City of Akron v. Akron Center for Reproductive Health (1983); Thornburgh v. American College of Obstetricians & Gynecologists (1986)

Planned Parenthood v. Casey, 505 U.S. 833 (1992), was a landmark decision of the United States Supreme Court in which the Court upheld the right to have an abortion as established by the "essential holding" of Roe v. Wade (1973) and issued as its "key judgment" the restoration of the undue burden standard when evaluating state-imposed restrictions on that right.

The case arose from a challenge to five provisions of the Pennsylvania Abortion Control Act of 1982, including requirements for a waiting period, spousal notice, and (for minors) parental consent prior to undergoing an abortion procedure. In a plurality opinion jointly written by associate justices Sandra Day O'Connor, Anthony Kennedy, and David Souter, the Supreme Court upheld the "essential holding" of Roe, which was that the Due Process Clause of the Fourteenth Amendment to the United States Constitution protected a woman's right to have an abortion prior to fetal viability.

The Court overturned the Roe trimester framework in favor of a viability analysis, thereby allowing states to implement abortion restrictions that apply during the first trimester of pregnancy. In its "key judgment", the Court overturned Roe's strict scrutiny standard of review of a state's abortion restrictions with the undue burden standard, under which abortion restrictions would be unconstitutional when they were enacted for "the purpose or effect of placing a substantial obstacle in the path of a woman seeking an abortion of a nonviable fetus." Applying this new standard of review, the Court upheld four provisions of the Pennsylvania law, but invalidated the requirement of spousal notification. Four justices wrote or joined opinions arguing that Roe v. Wade should have been struck down, while two justices wrote opinions favoring the preservation of the higher standard of review for abortion restrictions.

== Background ==
In Casey, the plaintiffs challenged five provisions of the Pennsylvania Abortion Control Act of 1982 authored by state Rep. Stephen F. Freind, arguing that the provisions were unconstitutional under Roe v. Wade. The Court in Roe was the first to establish abortion as a fundamental right protected by the Due Process Clause of the Fourteenth Amendment to the U.S. Constitution. The majority in Roe further held that women have a privacy interest protecting their right to abortion embedded in the Due Process Clause. The five provisions at issue in Casey are summarized below.

- § 3205's informed consent — a woman seeking abortion had to give her informed consent prior to the procedure. The doctor had to provide her with specific information at least 24 hours before the procedure was to take place, including information about how the abortion could be detrimental to her health and about the availability of information about the fetus.
- § 3209's spousal notice — a married woman seeking abortion had to sign a statement declaring that she had notified her husband prior to undergoing the procedure, unless certain exceptions applied.
- § 3206's parental consent — minors had to get the informed consent of at least one parent or guardian prior to the abortion procedure. Alternatively, minors could seek judicial bypass in lieu of consent.
- § 3203's medical emergency definition — defining a medical emergency as "[t]hat condition, which, on the basis of the physician's good faith clinical judgment, so complicates the medical condition of a pregnant woman as to necessitate the immediate abortion of her pregnancy to avert her death or for which a delay will create serious risk of substantial and irreversible impairment of a major bodily function."
- §§ 3207(b), 3214(a), and 3214(f)'s reporting requirements — certain reporting and record keeping mandates were imposed on facilities providing abortion services.

The case was a seminal one in the history of abortion decisions in the United States. It was the first case to provide an opportunity to overturn Roe since two liberal U.S. Associate Justices, William J. Brennan Jr. and Thurgood Marshall, had been replaced with the George H. W. Bush-appointed Justices David Souter and Clarence Thomas. Both were viewed, in comparison to their predecessors, as ostensible conservatives. This left the Court with eight Republican-appointed justices, five of whom had been appointed by Presidents Ronald Reagan or Bush, both of whom were well known for their opposition to Roe. Finally, the only remaining Democratic appointee was Justice Byron White, who had been one of the two dissenters from the original Roe decision and had stood by his dissent in his subsequent dissenting opinion in Thornburgh v. American College of Obstetricians & Gynecologists saying, "I continue to believe that this venture [the substantive due process right to abortion] has been fundamentally misguided since its inception". At this point, only two of the Justices were obvious supporters of Roe v. Wade: Harry Blackmun, the author of Roe, and John Paul Stevens, who had joined opinions specifically reaffirming Roe in City of Akron v. Akron Center for Reproductive Health and Thornburgh v. American College of Obstetricians & Gynecologists.

The case was argued by American Civil Liberties Union attorney Kathryn Kolbert for Planned Parenthood, with Linda J. Wharton serving as Co-Lead Counsel. Pennsylvania Attorney General, Ernie Preate, argued the case for the state, focusing mainly on how the law could be upheld without overturning Roe, though suggesting Roe be overturned as an alternative means of upholding the law. Upon reaching the Supreme Court, the United States joined the case as an amicus curiae, and U.S. Solicitor General, Ken Starr of the Bush Administration, defended the Act in part by urging the Court to overturn Roe as having been wrongly decided.

=== District Court's ruling ===
The plaintiffs were five abortion clinics, a class of physicians who provided abortion services, and one physician representing himself independently. They filed suit in the U.S. District Court for the Eastern District of Pennsylvania to enjoin the state from enforcing the five provisions and have them declared facially unconstitutional. The District Court, after a three-day bench trial, held that all the provisions were unconstitutional and entered a permanent injunction against Pennsylvania's enforcement of them.

=== Third Circuit Court of Appeals decision ===
The Court of Appeals for the Third Circuit affirmed in part and reversed in part, upholding all of the regulations except for the husband notification requirement. The Third Circuit concluded that the husband notification was unduly burdensome because it potentially exposed married women to spousal abuse, violence, and economic duress at the hands of their husbands. Then-Circuit Judge Samuel Alito sat on that three-judge appellate panel and dissented from the court's invalidation of that requirement. Thirty-one years later, as a Supreme Court Justice, Alito wrote the opinion in Dobbs v. Jackson Women's Health Organization, which overturned Roe and Casey.

=== Supreme Court's consideration ===
At the conference of the Justices two days after oral argument, Souter defied expectations, joining Justices Stevens, Blackmun, and Sandra Day O'Connor, who had all dissented three years earlier in Webster v. Reproductive Health Services with regard to that plurality's suggested reconsideration and narrowing of Roe. This resulted in a precarious five-Justice majority consisting of Chief Justice William Rehnquist, Byron White, Antonin Scalia, Anthony Kennedy, and Clarence Thomas that favored upholding all five contested abortion restrictions and overturning Roe; however, Kennedy changed his mind shortly thereafter, and joined with fellow Reagan-Bush justices O'Connor and Souter to write a plurality opinion that would reaffirm Roe.

== Supreme Court's opinions ==
Except for the three opening sections of the O'Connor–Kennedy–Souter opinion, Casey was a divided judgment, as no other sections of any opinion were joined by a majority of justices. The plurality opinion jointly written by Justices O'Connor, Kennedy, and Souter was recognized as the principal opinion. (Note: The term “principal opinion” has been used to refer to an opinion, part of which is a majority opinion and part of which is a plurality opinion, see Parker v. Randolph, 442 U. S. 62, 77, 78, 80 (1979) (Blackmun, J., concurring in part and concurring in judgment), and to an opinion, part of which is a majority opinion and part of which is a nonplurality opinion, see Idaho v. Coeur d’Alene Tribe of Idaho, 521 U. S. 261, 288-297 (1997) (O’Connor, J., concurring in part and concurring in judgment).)

=== O'Connor, Kennedy, and Souter plurality opinion ===
In the 1992 case of Planned Parenthood v. Casey, the authors of the plurality opinion abandoned Roe's strict trimester framework but maintained its central holding that women have a right to have an abortion before viability. Roe had held that statutes regulating abortion must be subject to "strict scrutiny"—the traditional Supreme Court test for impositions upon fundamental Constitutional rights. Casey instead re-adopted the lower, undue burden standard for evaluating state abortion restrictions, (Note: "To protect the central right recognized by Roe v. Wade while at the same time accommodating the State's profound interest in potential life, we will employ the undue burden analysis as explained in this opinion. An undue burden exists, and therefore, a provision of law is invalid, if its purpose or effect is to place a substantial obstacle in the path of a woman seeking an abortion before the fetus attains viability.") but re-emphasized the right to abortion as grounded in the general sense of liberty and privacy protected under the constitution. (Note: "Constitutional protection of the woman's decision to terminate her pregnancy derives from the Due Process Clause of the Fourteenth Amendment. It declares that no State shall "deprive any person of life, liberty, or property, without due process of law." The controlling word in the cases before us is 'liberty'.") The authors of the plurality opinion likewise noted the U.S. government's previous challenges to Roe v. Wade (Note: "Liberty finds no refuge in a jurisprudence of doubt. Yet 19 years after our holding that the Constitution protects a woman's right to terminate her pregnancy in its early stages, Roe v. Wade (1973), that definition of liberty is still questioned. Joining the respondents as amicus curiae, the United States, as it has done in five other cases in the last decade, again asks us to overrule Roe.") and expounded on the concept of "liberty." (Note: "Our law affords constitutional protection to personal decisions relating to marriage, procreation, contraception, family relationships, child rearing, and education. Our cases recognize "the right of the individual, married or single, to be free from unwarranted governmental intrusion into matters so fundamentally affecting a person as the decision whether to bear or beget a child." Our precedents "have respected the private realm of family life which the state cannot enter." These matters, involving the most intimate and personal choices a person may make in a lifetime, choices central to personal dignity and autonomy, are central to the liberty protected by the Fourteenth Amendment. At the heart of liberty is the right to define one's own concept of existence, of meaning, of the universe, and of the mystery of human life. Beliefs about these matters could not define the attributes of personhood were they formed under compulsion of the State.")

==== Upholding the "essential holding" in Roe ====
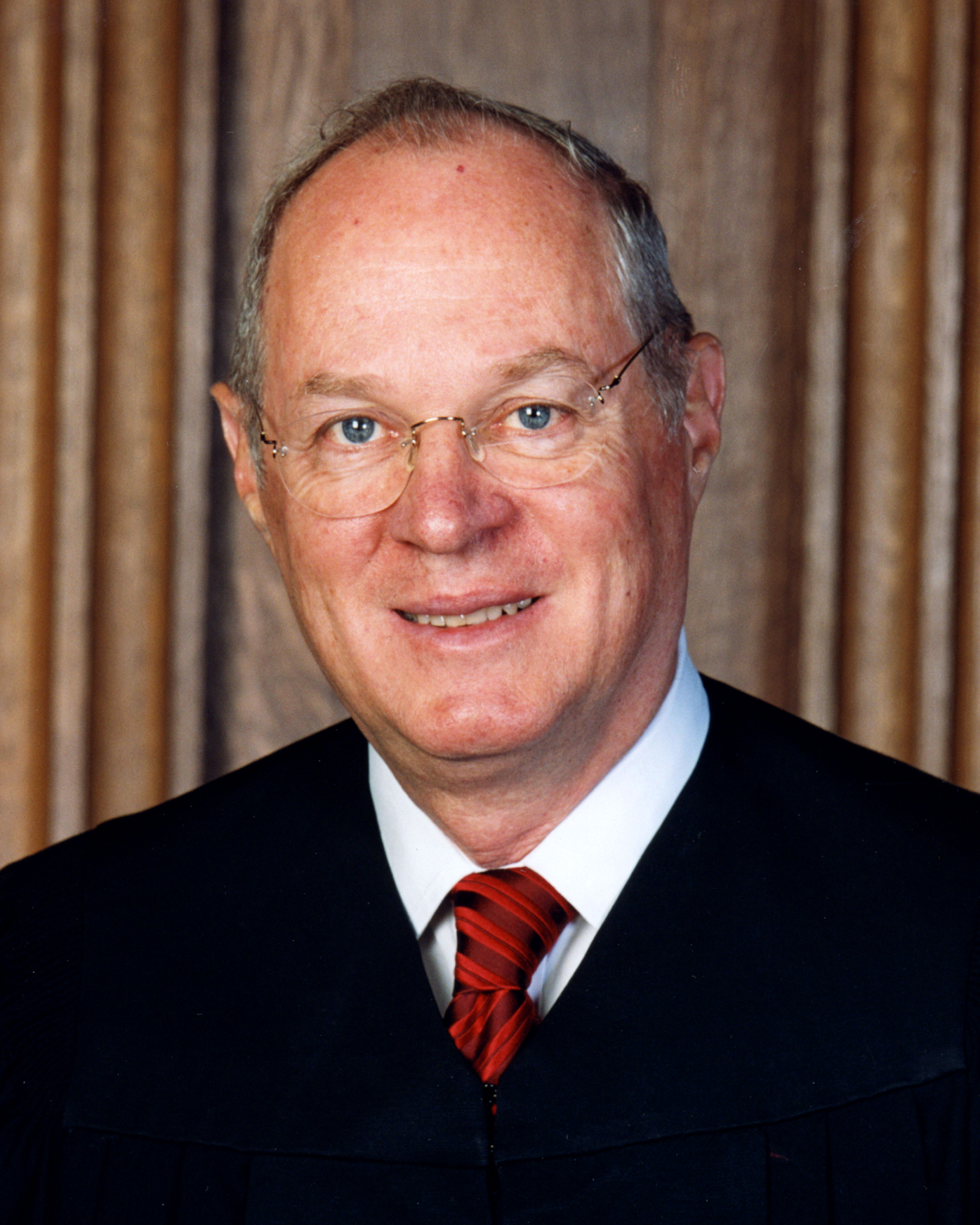
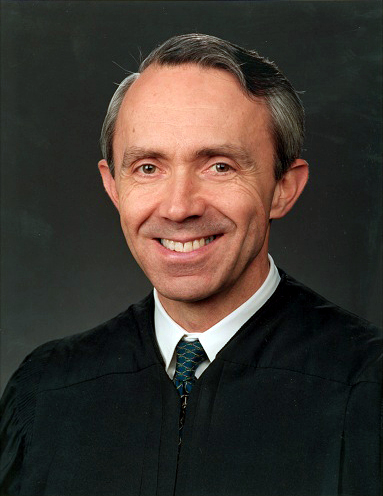
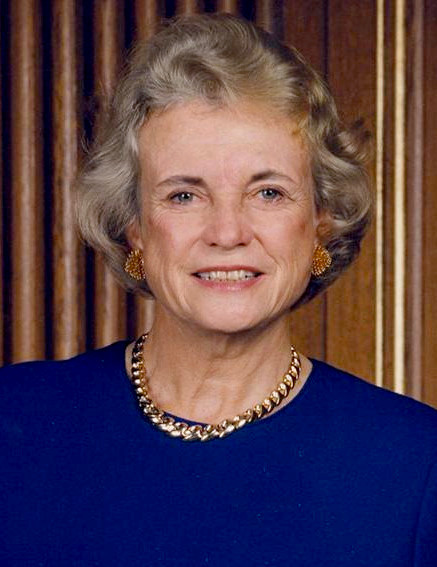
Justices Anthony Kennedy, David Souter, and Sandra Day O'Connor, all appointed by Republican presidents, defied expectations and helped craft the three-justice plurality opinion that refused to overturn Roe.

The plurality opinion stated that it was upholding what it called the "essential holding" of Roe. The essential holding consisted of three parts: (1) Women had the right to have an abortion prior to viability and to do so without undue interference from the State; (2) the State could restrict the abortion procedure post-viability, so long as the law contained exceptions for pregnancies which endangered the woman's life or health; and (3) the State had legitimate interests from the outset of the pregnancy in protecting the health of the woman and the life of the fetus that may become a child. The plurality asserted that the fundamental right to abortion was grounded in the Due Process Clause of the Fourteenth Amendment, and the plurality reiterated what the Court said in Eisenstadt v. Baird: "If the right of privacy means anything, it is the right of the individual, married or single, to be free from unwarranted governmental intrusion into matters so fundamentally affecting a person as the decision whether to bear or beget a child."

==== Stare decisis analysis ====
The plurality's opinion included a thorough discussion on the doctrine of stare decisis (respect of precedent), and provided a clear explanation for why the doctrine had to be applied in Casey with regards to Roe. The authors of the plurality opinion emphasized that stare decisis had to apply in Casey because the Roe rule had not been proven intolerable; the rule had become subject "to a kind of reliance that would lend a special hardship to the consequences of overruling and add inequity to the cost of repudiation"; the law had not developed in such a way around the rule that left the rule "no more than a remnant of abandoned doctrine"; and the facts had not changed, nor viewed differently, to "rob the old rule of significant application or justification." The plurality acknowledged that it was important for the Court to stand by prior decisions, even those decisions some found unpopular, unless there was a change in the fundamental reasoning underpinning the previous decision. The authors of the plurality opinion, making a special note of the precedential value of Roe v. Wade, and specifically how women's lives were changed by that decision, stated,

The sum of the precedential enquiry to this point shows Roe's underpinnings unweakened in any way affecting its central holding. While it has engendered disapproval, it has not been unworkable. An entire generation has come of age free to assume Roe's concept of liberty in defining the capacity of women to act in society, and to make reproductive decisions; no erosion of principle going to liberty or personal autonomy has left Roe's central holding a doctrinal remnant.

The authors of the plurality opinion also acknowledged the need for predictability and consistency in judicial decision making. For example,

Where, in the performance of its judicial duties, the Court decides a case in such a way as to resolve the sort of intensely divisive controversy reflected in Roe and those rare, comparable cases, its decision has a dimension that the resolution of the normal case does not carry. It is the dimension present whenever the Court's interpretation of the Constitution calls the contending sides of a national controversy to end their national division by accepting a common mandate rooted in the Constitution."

The plurality went on to analyze past judgments refusing to apply the doctrine of stare decisis, such as Brown v. Board of Education. There, the authors of the plurality opinion explained, society's rejection of the "Separate but Equal" concept was a legitimate reason for the Brown v. Board of Education court's rejection of the Plessy v. Ferguson doctrine. Emphasizing the lack of need to overrule the essential holding of Roe, and the Court's need to not be seen as overruling a prior decision merely because the individual members of the Court had changed, the authors of the plurality opinion stated,

Because neither the factual underpinnings of Roe's central holding nor our understanding of it has changed (and because no other indication of weakened precedent has been shown), the Court could not pretend to be reexamining the prior law with any justification beyond a present doctrinal disposition to come out differently from the Court of 1973.

The plurality further emphasized that the Court would lack legitimacy if it frequently changed its Constitutional decisions, stating,

The Court must take care to speak and act in ways that allow people to accept its decisions on the terms the Court claims for them, as grounded truly in principle, not as compromises with social and political pressures having, as such, no bearing on the principled choices that the Court is obliged to make.

Since the O'Connor-Kennedy-Souter plurality overruled some portions of Roe v. Wade despite its emphasis on stare decisis, Chief Justice Rehnquist in dissent argued that this section was entirely obiter dicta. All these opening sections were joined by Justices Blackmun and Stevens for the majority. The remainder of the decision did not command a majority, but at least two other Justices concurred in judgment on each of the remaining points.

==== Viability of the fetus ====
Although it upheld the "essential holding" in Roe, and recognized that women had some constitutional liberty to terminate their pregnancies, the O'Connor–Kennedy–Souter plurality overturned the Roe trimester framework in favor of a viability analysis. The Roe trimester framework completely forbade states from regulating abortion during the first trimester of pregnancy, permitted regulations designed to protect a woman's health in the second trimester, and permitted prohibitions on abortion during the third trimester (when the fetus becomes viable) under the justification of fetal protection, and so long as the life or health of the mother was not at risk. The plurality found that continuing advancements in medical technology had proven that a fetus could be considered viable at 23 or 24 weeks rather than at the 28 weeks previously understood by the Court in Roe. The plurality thus redrew the line of increasing state interest at viability because of increasing medical accuracy about when fetus viability takes place. Likewise, the authors of the plurality opinion felt that fetus viability was "more workable" than the trimester framework. Under this new fetus viability framework, the plurality held that at the point of viability and subsequent to viability, the state could promote its interest in the "potentiality of human life" by regulating, or possibly proscribing, abortion "except where it is necessary, in appropriate medical judgment, for the preservation of the life or health of the mother." Prior to fetus viability, the plurality held, the State can show concern for fetal development, but it cannot pose an undue burden on a woman's fundamental right to abortion. The plurality reasoned that the new pre- and post-viability line would still uphold the essential holding of Roe, which recognized both the woman's constitutionally protected liberty, and the State's "important and legitimate interest in potential life." (Note: "[T]o protect the central right recognized by Roe v. Wade while at the same time accommodating the State's profound interest in potential life, we will employ the undue burden analysis as explained in this opinion.").)

==== Undue burden standard ====
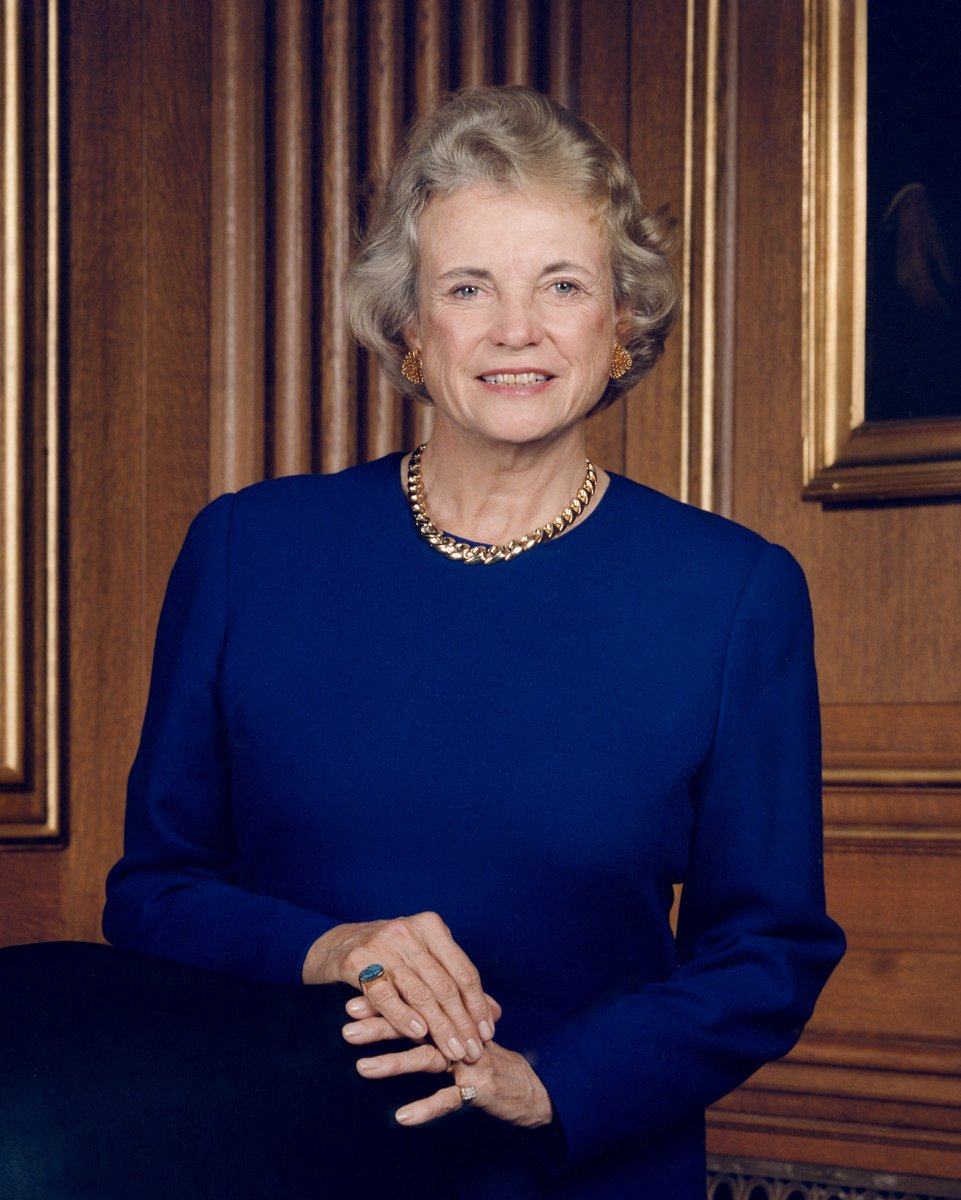
Justice Sandra Day O'Connor was one of the three authors of the "undue burden" standard that she first advocated for in earlier abortion rulings.

In replacing the trimester framework with the viability framework, the plurality also replaced the strict scrutiny analysis under Roe, with the "undue burden" standard previously developed by O'Connor in her dissent in Akron v. Akron Center for Reproductive Health. According to the dissenters in Akron, the undue burden standard had been the governing rule in Roe's first decade. A legal restriction posing an undue burden is one that has "the purpose or effect of placing a substantial obstacle in the path of a woman seeking an abortion of a nonviable fetus." An undue burden is found even where a statute purports to further the interest of potential life or another valid state interest, if it places a substantial obstacle in the path of access to abortion. The Supreme Court in the 2016 case Whole Woman's Health v. Hellerstedt clarified what the 'undue burden' test requires: "Casey requires courts to consider the burdens a law imposes on abortion access together with the benefits those laws confer." The Supreme Court further clarified in the 2020 June Medical Services, LLC v. Russo opinion written by Justice Stephen Breyer with respect to the undue burden standard: "[T]his standard requires courts independently to review the legislative findings upon which an abortion-related statute rests and to weigh the law's "asserted benefits against the burdens" it imposes on abortion access. 579 U.S., at ___(slip op., at 21) (citing Gonzales v. Carhart, 550 U. S. 124, 165 (2007))." In Whole Woman's Health v. Hellerstedt the court described the undue burden standard in its overall context with these words:

We begin with the standard, as described in Casey. We recognize that the "State has a legitimate interest in seeing to it that abortion, like any other medical procedure, is performed under circumstances that insure maximum safety for the patient." Roe v. Wade, 410 U. S. 113, 150 (1973). But, we added, "a statute which, while furthering [a] valid state interest, has the effect of placing a substantial obstacle in the path of a woman's choice cannot be considered a permissible means of serving its legitimate ends." Casey, 505 U. S., at 877 (plurality opinion). Moreover, "[u]nnecessary health regulations that have the purpose or effect of presenting a substantial obstacle to a woman seeking an abortion impose an undue burden on the right." Id., at 878.

In applying the new undue burden standard, the plurality overruled City of Akron v. Akron Center for Reproductive Health, 462 U.S. 416 (1983) and Thornburgh v. American College of Obstetricians and Gynecologists, 476 U.S. 747 (1986), each of which applied "strict scrutiny" to abortion restrictions.

Applying this new standard to the challenged Pennsylvania Act, the plurality struck down the spousal notice requirement, finding that for many women, the statutory provision would impose a substantial obstacle in their path to receive an abortion. The plurality recognized that the provision gave too much power to husbands over their wives ("a spousal notice requirement enables the husband to wield an effective veto over his wife's decision"), and could worsen situations of spousal and child abuse. In finding the provision unconstitutional, the authors of the plurality opinion clarified that the focus of the undue burden test is on the group "for whom the law is a restriction, not the group for whom the law is irrelevant." Otherwise stated, courts should not focus on what portion of the population is affected by the legislation, but rather on the population the law would restrict. (Note: "The proper focus of constitutional inquiry is the group for whom the law is a restriction, not the group for whom the law is irrelevant.") The plurality upheld the remaining contested regulations – the State's informed consent and 24-hour waiting period, parental consent requirements, reporting requirements, and the "medical emergencies" definition – holding that none constituted an undue burden.

Notably, when the authors of the plurality discuss the right to privacy in the joint opinion, it is all within the context of a quotation or paraphrase from Roe or other previous cases. The authors of the plurality opinion do not, however, explicitly or implicitly state that they do not believe in a right to privacy, or that they do not support the use of privacy in Roe to justify the fundamental right to abortion. Justice Blackmun would not agree with an implication asserting otherwise, stating "[t]he Court today reaffirms the long recognized rights of privacy and bodily integrity."

==== Key judgment ====
Chief Justice John Roberts's concurrence in the 2020 June Medical Services, LLC v. Russo case noted the key outcomes in Casey: "The several restrictions that did not impose a substantial obstacle were constitutional, while the restriction that did impose a substantial obstacle was unconstitutional." Before an abortion regulation can be struck down as unconstitutional there must be a determination that this regulation imposes a substantial obstacle in light of the undue burden standard explained in the section above. In Casey "the justices imposed a new standard to determine the validity of laws restricting abortions. The new standard asks whether a state abortion regulation has the purpose or effect of imposing an "undue burden", which is defined as a "substantial obstacle in the path of a woman seeking an abortion before the fetus attains viability." The key judgment of Casey can be summed up as follows: "Under Casey, abortion regulations are valid so long as they do not pose a substantial obstacle and meet the threshold requirement of being "reasonably related" to a "legitimate purpose." Id., at 878; id., at 882 (joint opinion)."

=== Concurrence/dissents ===
Justices Harry Blackmun and John Paul Stevens, who both joined the plurality in part, also each filed opinions concurring in the Court's judgment in part and dissenting in part. Chief Justice William Rehnquist filed an opinion concurring in the Court's judgment in part and dissenting in part, which was joined by Justices Byron White, Antonin Scalia, and Clarence Thomas, none of whom joined any part of the plurality. Justice Scalia also filed an opinion concurring in the judgment in part and dissenting in part, which was also joined by Rehnquist, White, and Thomas.

==== Rehnquist and Scalia, joined by White and Thomas ====
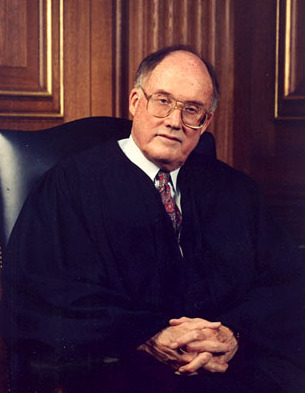
Chief Justice William Rehnquist was the senior justice of the four that dissented against the upholding of Roe.

Rehnquist and Scalia each joined the plurality in upholding the parental consent, informed consent, and waiting period laws. However, they dissented from the plurality's decision to uphold Roe v. Wade and strike down the spousal notification law, contending that Roe was incorrectly decided. In his opinion, Chief Justice Rehnquist questioned the fundamental right to an abortion, the "right to privacy", and the strict scrutiny application in Roe. He also questioned the new "undue burden" analysis under the plurality opinion, instead deciding that the proper analysis for the regulation of abortions was rational-basis.

In his opinion, Justice Scalia also argued for a rational-basis approach, finding that the Pennsylvania statute in its entirety was constitutional. He argued that abortion was not a "protected" liberty, and as such, the abortion liberty could be intruded upon by the State. To this end, Justice Scalia concluded this was so because an abortion right was not in the Constitution, and "longstanding traditions of American society" have allowed abortion to be legally proscribed. Rehnquist and Scalia joined each other's concurrence/dissents. White and Thomas, who did not write their own opinions, joined in both.

==== Stevens and Blackmun ====
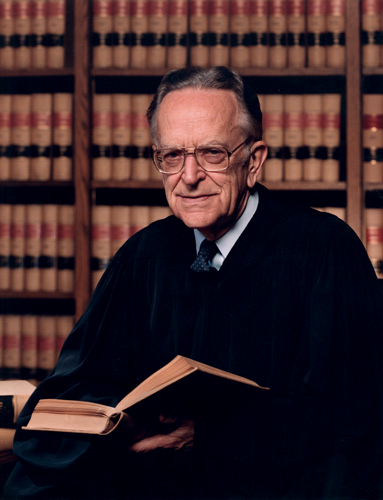
Justice Harry Blackmun, the original author of Roe, would have struck down all of the Pennsylvania abortion restrictions, continuing to apply strict scrutiny.

Justices Blackmun and Stevens wrote opinions in which they approved of the plurality's preservation of Roe and rejection of the spousal notification law. They did not agree with the plurality's decision to uphold the other three laws at issue.

Justice Stevens concurred in part and dissented in part. Justice Stevens joined the plurality's preservation of Roe and rejection of the spousal notification law, but under his interpretation of the undue burden standard ("[a] burden may be 'undue' either because the burden is too severe or because it lacks a legitimate rational justification"), he would have found the information requirements in §§ 3205(a)(2)(i)–(iii) and § 3205(a)(1)(ii), and the 24-hour waiting period in §§ 3205(a)(1)–(2) unconstitutional. Instead of applying an undue burden analysis, Justice Stevens would have preferred to apply the analyses in Akron and Thornburgh, two cases that had applied a strict scrutiny analysis, to reach the same conclusions. Justice Stevens also placed great emphasis on the fact that women had a right to bodily integrity, and a constitutionally protected liberty interest to decide matters of the "highest privacy and the most personal nature." As such, Justice Stevens felt that a State should not be permitted to attempt to "persuade the woman to choose childbirth over abortion"; he felt this was too coercive and violated the woman's decisional autonomy.

Justice Blackmun concurred in part, concurred in the judgment in part, and dissented in part. He joined the plurality's preservation of Roe – of which he wrote the majority – and he, too, rejected the spousal notification law. Justice Blackmun, however, argued for a woman's right to privacy and insisted, as he did in Roe, that all non-de-minimis abortion regulations were subject to strict scrutiny. Using such an analysis, Justice Blackmun argued that the content-based counseling, the 24-hour waiting period, informed parental consent, and the reporting regulations were unconstitutional. He also dissented from the plurality's undue burden test, and instead found his trimester framework "administrable" and "far less manipulable". Blackmun even went further in his opinion than Stevens, sharply attacking and criticizing the anti-Roe bloc of the Court.

== Supreme Court's holdings overturned ==
In May 2022, Politico obtained a leaked initial draft majority opinion written by Justice Samuel Alito suggesting that the Supreme Court was poised to overturn Casey along with Roe in a pending final decision on Dobbs v. Jackson Women's Health Organization. On June 24, 2022, the final opinion was issued, with the Court overturning the "essential opinion" in Roe, (Note: "[T]he Court finds the Fourteenth Amendment clearly does not protect the right to an abortion ... The Court concludes the right to obtain an abortion cannot be justified as a component of [a broader entrenched right that is supported by other precedents] ... The Constitution does not prohibit the citizens of each State from regulating or prohibiting abortion. Roe and Casey arrogated that authority ... .") criticizing the Casey Court's failure to address the deficiencies of the Roe decision (Note: "Casey, in short, either refused to reaffirm or rejected important aspects of Roe's analysis, failed to remedy glaring deficiencies in Roe's reasoning, endorsed what it termed Roe's central holding while suggesting that a majority might not have thought it was correct, provided no new support for the abortion right other than Roe's status as precedent, and imposed a new test with no firm grounding in constitutional text, history, or precedent ... .") and overturning the "key judgment" in Casey. (Note: "Under the Court's precedents, rational-basis review is the appropriate standard to apply when state abortion regulations undergo constitutional challenge. Given that procuring an abortion is not a fundamental constitutional right, it follows that the States may regulate abortion for legitimate reasons, and when such regulations are challenged under the Constitution, courts cannot 'substitute their social and economic beliefs for the judgment of legislative bodies.'")

The dissenting opinion disputed the majority's opinion that the "undue burden" standard was not workable, and criticized the majority for overturning precedent, (Note: "By overruling Roe, Casey, and more than 20 cases reaffirming or applying the constitutional right to abortion, the majority abandons stare decisis, a principle central to the rule of law. 'Stare decisis' means 'to stand by things decided.' ... It maintains a stability that allows people to order their lives under the law.") holding that their reasoning was not sufficient to overrule Roe and Casey, (Note: "Stare decisis also 'contributes to the integrity of our constitutional system of government' by ensuring that decisions 'are founded in the law rather than in the proclivities of individuals.' As Hamilton wrote: It 'avoid[s] an arbitrary discretion in the courts.' And as Blackstone said before him: It 'keep[s] the scale of justice even and steady, and not liable to waver with every new judge’s opinion.' The 'glory' of our legal system is that it 'gives preference to precedent rather than . . . jurists.' ... That means the Court may not overrule a decision, even a constitutional one, without a 'special justification.' Stare decisis is, of course, not an 'inexorable command'; it is sometimes appropriate to overrule an earlier decision. But the Court must have a good reason to do so over and above the belief 'that the precedent was wrongly decided.'") which they described as a precedent about precedent, and warned that by the same reasoning many other rights would be under threat. (Note: "And no one should be confident that this majority is done with its work. The right Roe and Casey recognized does not stand alone. To the contrary, the Court has linked it for decades to other settled freedoms involving bodily integrity, familial relationships, and procreation. Most obviously, the right to terminate a pregnancy arose straight out of the right to purchase and use contraception. In turn, those rights led, more recently, to rights of same-sex intimacy and marriage. They are all part of the same constitutional fabric, protecting autonomous decisionmaking over the most personal of life decisions. The majority (or to be more accurate, most of it) is eager to tell us today that nothing it does 'cast[s] doubt on precedents that do not concern abortion.' But how could that be? The lone rationale for what the majority does today is that the right to elect an abortion is not 'deeply rooted in history': Not until Roe, the majority argues, did people think abortion fell within the Constitution's guarantee of liberty. The same could be said, though, of most of the rights the majority claims it is not tampering with. The majority could write just as long an opinion showing, for example, that until the mid-20th century, 'there was no support in American law for a constitutional right to obtain [contraceptives].' So one of two things must be true. Either the majority does not really believe in its own reasoning. Or if it does, all rights that have no history stretching back to the mid-19th century are insecure. Either the mass of the majority's opinion is hypocrisy, or additional constitutional rights are under threat. It is one or the other.")

== See also ==
- Griswold v. Connecticut, holding that a Connecticut statute prohibiting the use of contraceptives violated the right to marital privacy.
- Eisenstadt v. Baird, extending the Court's holding in Griswold to unmarried couples on the grounds of equal protection.
- Roe v. Wade, holding that the Due Process Clause protects a woman's right to obtain an abortion under certain circumstances.
- Dobbs v. Jackson Women's Health Organization, overruling Roe and Casey.
- 2022 abortion rights protests in the United States

== Sources ==
- Wharton, Linda J.; Frietsche, Susan; Kolbert, Kathryn (2006). "Preserving the Core of Roe: Reflections on Planned Parenthood v. Casey". Yale J.L. & Feminism. 18 (2): 317.
- Dobbs v Jackson Women's Health Organization, 597 U.S. _ (2022).
- Eisenstadt v. Baird, 405 U.S. 438 (1972).
- June Medical Services, LLC v. Russo, 591 U.S. 1101 (2020).
- Planned Parenthood v. Casey, 744 F. Supp. 1323 (E.D. Pa. 1990).
- Planned Parenthood v Casey, 957 F.2d 682 (3d Cir. 1991).
- Planned Parenthood v Casey, 505 U.S. 833 (1992).
- Roe v. Wade, 410 U.S. 113 (1973).
- Whole Woman's Health v. Hellerstedt, 579 U.S. 582 (2016).
- Constitutional Law and Politics: Civil Rights and Civil Liberties, Eighth Edition. W. W. Norton & Company. 2011. ISBN 9780393935509.
- The Supreme Court's Style Guide (PDF). Inter Alias. 2016. ISBN 9780991116331. Archived from the original (PDF) on December 5, 2021.
