= List of abortion-rights organizations in the United States =

This is a list of organizations involved in the United States abortion-rights movement (also called the pro-choice movement). The movement consists of a variety of organizations, with no single centralized decision-making body.

== National organizations ==
=== Abortion providers ===
- Planned Parenthood, the largest provider of reproductive health services in the US, including abortions

=== Political organizations ===
- Democratic Party, one of America's two major political parties, supports liberal policies, including abortion access
- Democratic Socialists of America, promotes socialist politics by advocating for various social justice issues
- EMILY's List, a political action committee (PAC) that aims to help elect Democratic female candidates in favor of abortion rights to office
- Freedom Socialist Party, a socialist feminist party and defender of free elective abortion care, no forced sterilization, gender-affirming health care and bodily autonomy for all
- Green Party of the United States, promotes green politics, including support for elective abortion care and contraception
- Party for Socialism and Liberation, a communist party working in the United States to liberate working-class individuals
- Peace and Freedom Party, a left-wing party supportive of environmentalism, aboriginal rights, rights to sexuality, government-funded health care, a woman's right to an abortion, public education, subsidized housing, and a socialist-run economy
- Radical Women a fighting organization for women's freedom, leadership of the most oppressed, an end to transphobia and racism, and a socialist feminist future
- Republicans for Choice, a PAC consisting of Republican Party members who support abortion rights
- Socialist Alternative, promotes a multi-gender, multi-race working class party focusing on economic issues affecting the working-class, social issues, political issues
- The Wish List, a PAC aiming to elect Republican female candidates in favor of abortion rights to office

=== Professional associations ===
- American College of Obstetricians and Gynecologists, a professional association of physicians specializing in obstetrics and gynecology
- Feminist Abortion Network, a national consortium of independent, feminist, not-for-profit abortion care providers
- National Abortion Federation, a professional association of abortion providers
- National Coalition of Abortion Providers, a defunct trade association representing independent abortion providers

=== Religious organizations ===
- Catholics for Choice, a pro-abortion rights Catholic advocacy group
- Clergy Consultation Service on Abortion, a defunct interfaith group of clergy that counseled and referred people for safe abortions before Roe v. Wade
- Joy of Satan Ministries, a polytheistic religion which believes Lillith to be a goddess of women's rights and decisions
- Methodist Federation for Social Action, a network of United Methodist Church clergy and laity working on social justice issues
- Religious Coalition for Reproductive Choice, an interfaith abortion rights organization founded in 1973 after Roe v. Wade
- The Satanic Temple, a nontheistic religion campaigning for reproductive rights
- United Methodist Women, the only official organization for women within the United Methodist Church

=== Other organizations ===
- African-American Women for Reproductive Freedom, a group developed as a way for African American women to show support for Roe v. Wade
- American Civil Liberties Union (ACLU)
- Ayn Rand Institute, a think tank that supports a woman's right to choose abortion
- Center for Reproductive Rights, a global legal advocacy organization that seeks to advance reproductive rights
- Guttmacher Institute, a research organization on sexual and reproductive health and rights
- I'm Not Sorry.net, a defunct website that collected stories concerning women's positive abortion experiences
- Ipas, an international, non-governmental organization that has the goal of increasing access to safe abortions and contraception
- Legal Alliance for Reproductive Rights, a coalition of United States law firms offering free legal services to people seeking and providing abortions
- MSI United States, a US non-profit 501c3 supporting MSI Reproductive Choices, an international NGO providing safe abortion, family planning and other reproductive health services to more than 23 million people annually in 36 countries across 6 continents
- NARAL Pro-Choice America, a 501(c)(4) organization that engages in lobbying, political action, and advocacy efforts to oppose restrictions on abortion and expand access to abortion
- National Health Law Program, a nonprofit organization working to protect and expand equitable access to health care for low-income and underserved communities
- National Mobilization for Reproductive Justice, a coalition of grassroots organizations and unions dedicated to building a coordinated mass defense of full reproductive justice on a platform of intersectional demands
- National Network of Abortion Funds, a national organization dedicated to increasing access to abortion for low-income people across the U.S.
- National Organization for Women, feminist organization founded in 1966 which supports abortion rights
- National Partnership for Women & Families, a nonprofit organization working on public policies, education and outreach that focuses on women and families
- Rewire News Group, a daily news publication focused on reproductive and sexual health
- Rise Up 4 Abortion Rights, a for-profit activist coalition that leads demonstrations to bring awareness after the overturning of Roe v. Wade
- Rock for Choice, a series of benefit concerts to allow musicians to support abortion-rights movements in the US and Canada
- SisterSong, a national activist organization dedicated to reproductive justice for women of color
- URGE: Unite for Reproductive & Gender Equity, a reproductive rights and justice non-profit organization (formerly named Choice USA)
- Women's Health Action and Mobilization, a defunct organization founded to protest the decision in Webster v. Reproductive Health Services

== State and local organizations ==
- Chicago Abortion Fund, providing medical referrals and funds to low-income women in need of safe abortion services
- Feminist Women's Health Center, based in Atlanta, Georgia
- Jane Collective, an underground abortion provider based in Chicago
- Maine Women's Lobby, dedicated to legislative action on behalf of women and girls in Maine
- West Coast offensive, a coalition of California, Oregon, and Washington to expand abortion access and refuse to extradite individuals to other states who receive or aide in abortion services

== See also ==
- List of anti-abortion organizations in the United States
