= Katherine Hancock Ragsdale =

- Diocese: Episcopal Diocese of Massachusetts

Personal details
- Denomination: Episcopal
- Spouse: Mally Lloyd

Katherine Hancock Ragsdale (born c. 1959) is an American Episcopal priest based in Massachusetts. She is the former president, and dean of Episcopal Divinity School. Before becoming dean she was director of Political Research Associates from May 2005 through June 2009. From September 2018 to October 2021, she was Interim President and CEO of the National Abortion Federation.

== Biography ==
She is an American progressive, and was a priest at St. David's Episcopal Church in Pepperell, part of the Episcopal Diocese of Massachusetts. Ragsdale has served for 17 years on the national board of the Religious Coalition for Reproductive Choice. She is also on the board of NARAL Pro-Choice America, The White House Project, the Progressive Religious Partnership, as well as the bi-national advisory board of the Center for the Prevention of Sexual and Domestic Violence. She presented to the United States Senate Committee on the Judiciary on behalf of NARAL Pro-Choice America and the Religious Coalition for Reproductive Choice in 2004.

She was named president and dean of Episcopal Divinity School on July 1, 2009. Her appointment was criticized by religious conservatives, including Anglicans, who have been particularly critical of her endorsement of the "blessing" of abortion.

She is the editor of Boundary Wars: Intimacy and Distance in Healing Relationships and the author of numerous articles, including The Role of Religious Institutions in Responding to the Domestic Violence Crisis and Hannah, a short story. She contributed an essay titled "Not by Outrage Alone" to the 2008 anthology Dispatches from the Religious Left: The Future of Faith and Politics in America

She is openly lesbian. On January 1, 2011, she married the Rev. Mally Lloyd at the Cathedral Church of St. Paul in Boston. Bishop M. Thomas Shaw performed the ceremony.

== See also ==
- National Abortion Rights Action League
- Christianity and abortion
- Carlton W. Veazey
