= Oriaku Njoku =

American activist

- Born: 1984 or 1985 (age 40–41)
- Education: University of Kentucky
- Occupation: Executive director
- Organization: National Network of Abortion Funds

Oriaku Njoku is an American activist for reproductive rights. In 2022, they were appointed executive director of the National Network of Abortion Funds. Njoku goes by she and they pronouns.

Njoku's parents moved to the U.S. from Nigeria. During childhood, Njoku lived in Michigan, Indiana, and Bowling Green, Kentucky. They attended the University of Kentucky, where they came out as queer.

Njoku co-founded and served as executive director of Access Reproductive Care-Southeast, an abortion fund based in Atlanta.

Njoku was included in the Time 100 Next 2022 List.

== Publications ==
- Thompson, Terri-Ann Monique; Young, Yves-Yvette; Bass, Tanya M; Baker, Stephanie; Njoku, Oriaku; Norwood, Jessica; Simpson, Monica (February 2022). "Racism Runs Through It: Examining The Sexual And Reproductive Health Experience Of Black Women In The South". Health Affairs. 41 (2): 195–202. doi:10.1377/hlthaff.2021.01422. PMID 35130060. S2CID 246650969.
- Rice, Whitney S.; Labgold, Katie; Peterson, Quita Tinsley; Higdon, Megan; Njoku, Oriaku (2021-04-06). "Sociodemographic and Service Use Characteristics of Abortion Fund Cases from Six States in the U.S. Southeast". International Journal of Environmental Research and Public Health. 18 (7): 3813. doi:10.3390/ijerph18073813. ISSN 1660-4601. PMC 8038751. PMID 33917408.
