= Ineedana =

Nonprofit platform providing information on abortion services in the United States

ineedana.com
- Formation: 2016
- Founders: Rebecca Nall
- Type: non-profit organization
- Website: www.ineedana.com

ineedana.com is a nonprofit organization and digital platform that provides information about in-person abortion clinics, telehealth services, and online access to abortion pills by mail to individuals seeking abortion services in the United States. Established in 2016, the website offers a user-friendly, confidential, and regularly updated online resource for abortion seekers that connects users with verified abortion providers, information on state-specific laws, and access to financial assistance. The website is designed to protect user privacy by not storing entered information and maintaining a small digital footprint.

== History ==
ineedana.com was founded by Rebecca Nall, a designer and engineer who, after her own experience seeking an abortion in Texas in 2012, recognized the need for a comprehensive and accessible resource. Frustrated by the fragmented and often misleading information available online, Nall developed the platform to provide clear and accurate guidance for individuals navigating abortion services. The site officially launched in 2016.

== Features ==
The platform offers several key features to support users:

- Clinic Finder: A search tool that helps users locate certified abortion providers based on their location, gestational age, and type of procedure desired.
- State-Specific Information: Detailed resources on abortion laws, costs, and access in each U.S. state, including information on parental consent laws for minors.
- Financial Assistance: Guidance on accessing abortion funds and support organizations to assist with costs and logistics.
- Privacy and Security: A commitment to user confidentiality by not storing any personally identifiable information entered during searches.

== Impact and Recognition ==
ineedana.com has been recognized for its significant role in providing accessible abortion information. It was described as the "Quintessential Post-Roe Resource" by The Nation and featured on HBO's Last Week Tonight with John Oliver.

== See also ==
- Reproductive rights
- Abortion in the United States
- List of abortion-rights organizations in the United States
