= Carlton W. Veazey =

American minister (1936–2021)

Carlton Veazey

Member of the District of Columbia City Council
- In office April 3, 1970 – August 8, 1973
- Appointed by: Richard Nixon
- Preceded by: Polly Shackleton
- Succeeded by: Antoinette Ford

Personal details
- Born: May 9, 1936 Memphis, Tennessee, U.S.
- Died: August 10, 2021 (aged 85) Washington, D.C., U.S.
- Party: Republican
- Education: University of Arkansas, Pine Bluff (BA); Howard University (MDiv)

Carlton W. Veazey (May 9, 1936 – August 10, 2021) was an American minister in the National Baptist Convention, U.S.A., and the President of the Religious Coalition for Reproductive Choice (RCRC). Veazey founded RCRC's National Black Church Initiative. Veazey was the 7th pastor of the Zion Baptist Church of DC from 1960 to 1993, when he was removed by vote of the membership. Veazey is a graduate from the University of Arkansas at Pine Bluff and the Howard University School of Divinity.

From April 3, 1970, to Aug 8, 1973 he was a Republican member of Washington, DC's appointed City Council just before the beginning of home rule, having been appointed by Nixon.

In addition to being an outspoken proponent of reproductive rights, he has also been an outspoken critic of theocracy in the United States and Christian fundamentalism.

He is a collaborator to the bulletin Religion Dispatches.

Veazey died on August 10, 2021, at the age of 85.

== See also ==
- Katherine Hancock Ragsdale
- Christianity and abortion
