= I'm not sorry =

I'm not sorry can refer to:

- "I'm Not Sorry", a song by Morrissey from his 2004 album You Are The Quarry
- "I'm Not Sorry", a 2006 song by The Pigeon Detectives
- I'm Not Sorry.net, a web site featuring accounts from women who do not regret having an abortion

== See also ==
- Not Sorry
