= Abortion Support Network =

UK charitable organization

- Formation: 2009; 17 years ago
- Type: Abortion rights charity
- Founder: Mara Clarke
- Website: ASN.org.uk

The Abortion Support Network is a UK charity and abortion fund which provides financial assistance, accommodation and consultation to people in Europe who are seeking an abortion abroad. The charity was founded in 2009 by Mara Clarke.

In 2017 as part of a coalition, ASN made a submission to the Citizens' Assembly. That same year, ASN fundraised and provided over £73,000 (€84,000) worth of grants for all associated expenses of obtaining an abortion, including travel. The team of volunteers fielded 1,009 phone calls (685 from Ireland) providing free advice.

In 2019, in partnership with five organisations in four countries, ASN launched Abortion Without Borders to help people in Poland access abortions. At the end of 2024, ASN reported that they had made over £1,400,000 in grants to people seeking abortions, and had been contacted by 10,000 people.

== See also ==
- Abortion in the Republic of Ireland
- Abortion in Poland
- National Network of Abortion Funds, a similar organization working in the United States
