= United States abortion-rights movement =

Support for women's right to elective abortion

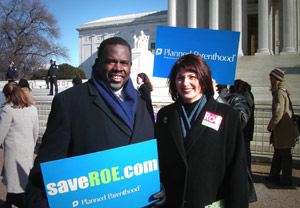
Albert Wynn and Gloria Feldt on the steps of the U.S. Supreme Court to rally for legal abortion on the anniversary of Roe v. Wade

The United States abortion-rights movement (also known as the pro-choice movement) is a sociopolitical movement in the United States supporting the view that a woman should have the legal right to an elective abortion, meaning the right to terminate her pregnancy, and is part of a broader global abortion-rights movement. The movement consists of a variety of organizations, with no single centralized decision-making body.

A key point in abortion rights in the United States was the U.S. Supreme Court's 1973 decision in Roe v. Wade, which struck down most state laws restricting abortion, thereby decriminalizing and legalizing elective abortion in a number of states. On June 24, 2022, Roe v. Wade was overruled in Dobbs v. Jackson Women's Health Organization.

On the other side of the abortion debate in the United States is the anti-abortion movement (self-described as the "pro-life movement"), which holds the belief that human embryos and fetuses have a right to life, and abortion violates this right and should be outlawed or otherwise restricted. Within this group, many argue that human personhood begins at conception, a position rejected by many abortion rights groups.

== Overview ==
Abortion-rights advocates argue that whether or not a pregnant woman continues with a pregnancy should be her personal choice, as it involves her body, personal health, and future. They also argue that more availability of legal abortions reduces the exposure of women to the risks associated with illegal abortions. More broadly, abortion-rights advocates frame their arguments in terms of individual liberty, reproductive freedom, and reproductive rights. The first of these terms was widely used to describe many of the political movements of the 19th and 20th centuries (such as in the abolition of slavery in Europe and the United States, and in the spread of popular democracy) whereas the latter terms derive from changing perspectives on sexual freedoms and bodily integrity.

Abortion-rights supporters rarely consider themselves "pro-abortion" because they consider termination of a pregnancy as a bodily autonomy issue, and find forced abortion to be as legally and morally indefensible as the outlawing of abortion. Indeed, some who support abortion rights consider themselves opposed to some or all abortions on a moral basis, but believe that abortions would happen in any case such that legal abortion under medically controlled conditions is preferable to illegal back-alley abortion without proper medical supervision. Such people believe the death rate of women due to such procedures in areas where abortions are only available outside of the medical establishment is unacceptable.

Some who argue from a philosophical viewpoint believe that an embryo has no rights as it is only a potential, not actual, person and that it should not have rights that override those of the pregnant woman at least until it is viable.

Many abortion-rights campaigners also note that some anti-abortion activists also oppose practices that correlate with less demand for abortion, namely sex education and the ready availability of contraception. Proponents of this argument point to cases of areas with limited sex education and contraceptive access that have high abortion rates, either legal or illegal. Some women also travel to another jurisdiction or country where they may obtain an abortion. For example, a large number of Irish women would visit the United Kingdom for abortions. For instance, Belgian women who travelled to France before Belgium legalized abortion. Similarly, women would travel to the Netherlands when it became legal to have abortions there in the 1970s.

The majority of Americans, despite what side of politics they are on, believe that abortion should be legal circumstantially. Some people who support abortion rights see abortion as a last resort and focus on situations where they feel abortion is a necessary option. Among these situations are those where the woman was raped, her health or life (or that of the fetus) is at risk, contraception was used but failed, the fetus has acute congenital disorder and defects, incest, financial constraints, or she feels unable to raise a child. One common reason women give for terminating unintended pregnancies is that having a baby would prevent them from achieving goals, such as pursuing an education. Some abortion-rights moderates, who would otherwise be willing to accept certain restrictions on abortion, feel that political pragmatism compels them to oppose any such restrictions, as they could be used to form a slippery slope against all abortions. On the other hand, even some abortion rights advocates feel uncomfortable with the use of abortion for sex-selection, as is practiced in some countries, such as India.

== History ==
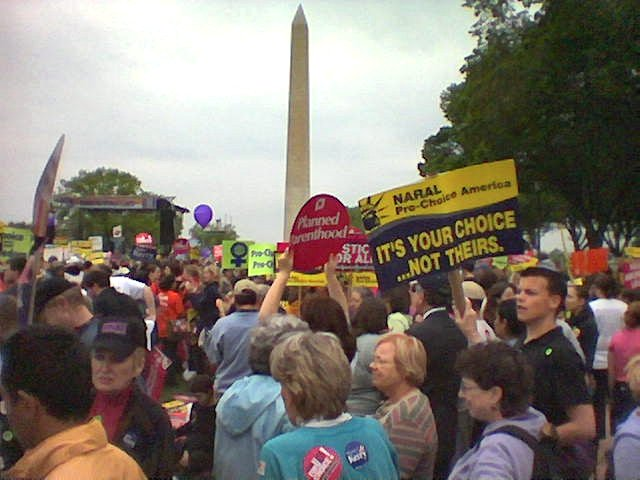
Abortion-rights activists before the Washington Monument in Washington, D.C., at the March for Women's Lives in 2004

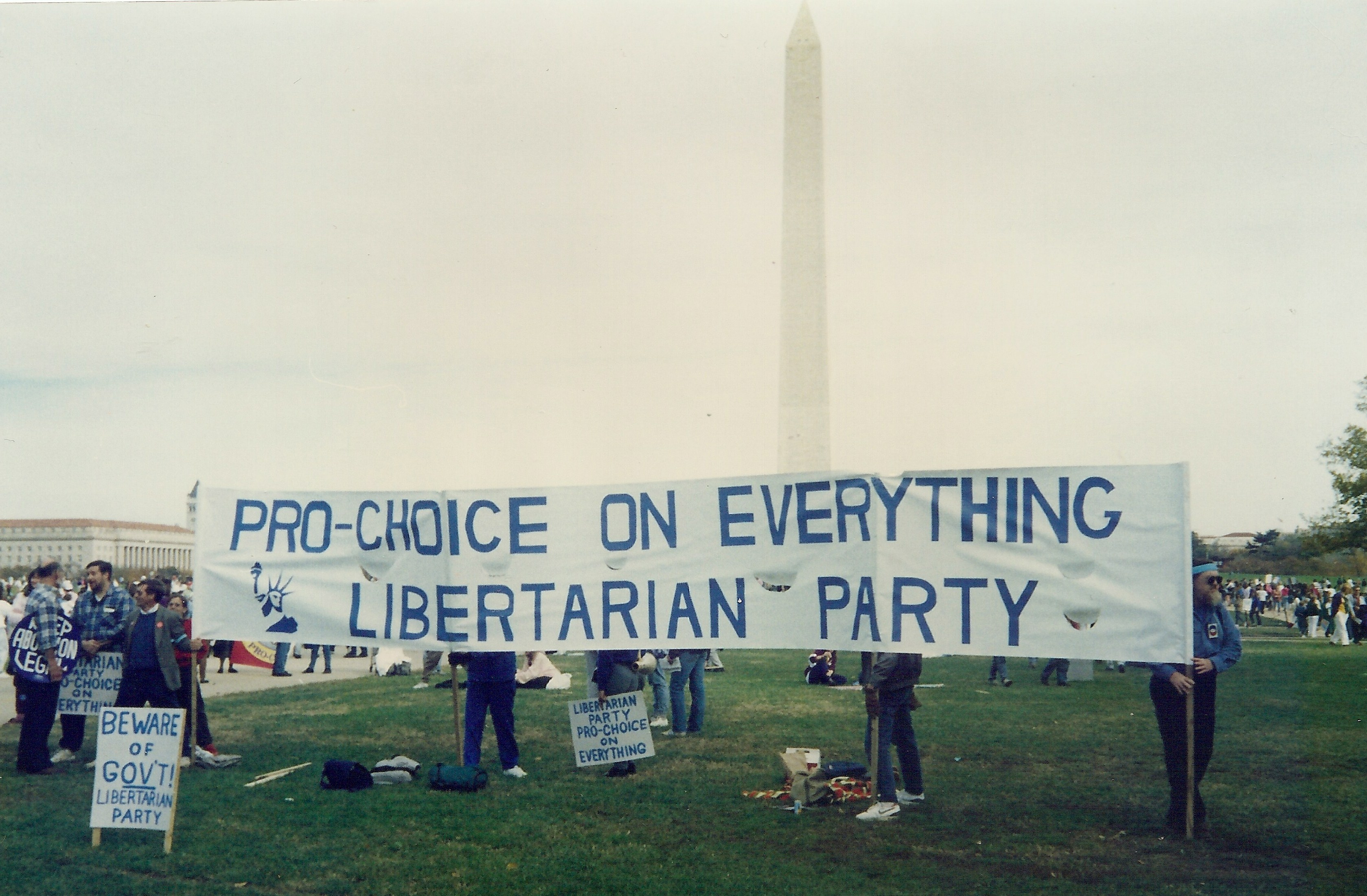
November 12, 1989 Washington, D.C., abortion rights march

Prior to 1973, abortion rights in the United States were not seen as a constitutional issue. Abortion was seen as a purely state matter, all of which had some type of restrictions. The first legal restrictions on abortion appeared in the 1820s, forbidding abortion after the fourth month of pregnancy. A number of early feminists expressed skepticism about outlawing abortion. They disliked abortion but thought anti-abortion laws did not apply "the proper remedies", according to one nineteenth-century women's rights pioneer. By 1900, legislators at the urgings of the American Medical Association (AMA) had enacted laws banning abortion in most U.S. states. The AMA played a vital role in stigmatizing abortions by using their status and power to create a moral stance against abortion. The AMA viewed abortion providers as unwanted healthcare competitors. Due to the high maternal morbidity and mortality rates caused by back alley abortions, physicians, nurses, and social workers pushed for legalization of abortion from a pro-public health perspective. Support for abortion rights went beyond feminists and medical professions. The broad support for legalizing abortion in the 1960s also derived from certain religious leaders. For example, there were 1,400 clergy operating on the East Coast for the Clergy Consultation Service on Abortion—an underground network that connected women seeking abortions to doctors—during the 1960s. As the historian Christine Stansell explained, many religious leaders came to approach the abortion rights argument from a position of individual conscience instead of from dogma by witnessing the "strains unwanted pregnancies put on members of their congregations".

In its landmark 1973 case Roe v. Wade, in which a woman challenged the Texas laws criminalizing abortion, the U.S. Supreme Court reached two important conclusions:

- That state abortion laws are subject to the due process clause of the Fourteenth Amendment to the United States Constitution; and
- That the procurement of an abortion was a constitutional right during the first and second trimesters of a pregnancy based on the constitutional right to privacy, but that the state's interest in protecting "potential life" prevailed in the third trimester unless the woman's health was at risk. In subsequent rulings, the Court rejected the trimester framework altogether in favor of a cutoff at the point of fetal viability (cf. Planned Parenthood v. Casey).

The outcome of Roe V. Wade divided Americans over the issue of abortion and the laws surrounding it. The issue became highly politicized as the Democratic and Republican parties took more polarized positions on abortion policy. The Democratic party advocated for abortion rights, while the Republican party supported the anti-abortion side.

In the 2010s, the Abortion-rights movement faced setbacks as more anti-abortion policies were beginning to be passed across various state legislatures. In 2015, the successes of the anti-abortion movement generated more anti-abortion policies in various states. During the first quarter of 2015, 322 provisions were introduced in multiple state legislatures. These new provisions included implementing existing laws like Targeted Restrictions on Abortion Providers laws (TRAP) that require abortion providers to meet the standards of an ambulatory surgical, prohibit state fund use on abortions, mandate counseling before an abortion, require waiting periods, parental involvement for minors, and restriction of abortion coverage in private insurance. Since 2000, the number of states that enacted more restrictive abortion policies has grown from 13 to 27 in 2013. The anti-abortion movement assisted in electing governors and policymakers that are more favorable towards their viewpoint. The election of these officials helped solidify party control of anti-abortion Republicans in both houses of state legislatures. In 2015, 31 of the 50 governors in the U.S. and two-thirds of the state legislatures they controlled held strong favorability towards anti-abortion policy. The majority of these anti-abortion states were concentrated in the southern and midwestern regions of the United States.

The outcome of the Dobbs v. Jackson Women's Health Organization case in 2022 led to trigger laws being enacted and the formation of new laws that involve anti-abortion policy. More than 470 abortion restriction policies were passed compared to 70 abortion protective policies that were passed across various state legislatures after the Dobbs case. Restrictive state abortion policy varied across the country, but a majority of laws heavily restricting or banning abortion were enacted in the southern and midwestern regions of the United States. Indiana was the first state in the country to ban abortion at zero weeks. States that have implemented new laws present new legal challenges for patients and clinicians.

Abortion-rights groups are active in all American states and at the federal level, campaigning for legal abortion and against the reimposition of anti-abortion laws, with varying degrees of success. Only a few states allow abortion without limitation or regulation, but most do allow various limited forms of abortion.

In the wake of extreme abortion restrictions in states like Georgia, Texas, Alabama, Missouri and Ohio, transgender, intersex and other gender-nonconforming people felt forgotten in this movement.

Abortion is one of the most common medical interventions undergone by women aged 15–44. In the US, childbirth carries a risk of death about 14 times higher than abortion.

The Democratic Party's platform endorses the abortion-rights position, stating that abortion should be "safe and legal". Not all Democrats agree with the platform, however, and there is a small anti-abortion faction within the party, expressed in such groups as Democrats for Life of America. Similarly, there is a small abortion-rights faction within the Republican Party. The Libertarian Party platform holds "that government should be kept out of the matter" of abortion.

== Roe v. Wade ==
Roe v. Wade was an essential court case in the U.S. abortion rights movement. The case was first tried in June 1970 by a Texas district court. The court ruled that Texas' law for abortions was unconstitutional and was appealed to the United States Supreme Court. This particular law made it a crime to have an abortion unless the mother's life would be in danger if she had the child. This issue was brought to the U.S. Supreme Court when a woman in Texas by the name of Norma McCorvey wanted to get an abortion. In the case, she was given the pseudonym "Jane Roe", and Henry Wade was the district attorney of Dallas County who the case was against. A lawsuit was filed on behalf of McCorvey by her lawyers, Linda Coffee and Sarah Weddington, claiming that particular articles for the Texas penal code, 1191-1194 and 1196, were unconstitutional. The lawyers' stance was that these articles took away a women's right to choose which went against the U.S. Constitution's Ninth Amendment.

On January 22, 1973, the United States Supreme Court ruled in favor of Jane Roe and banned the law in Texas that only allowed abortions if the mother's life was at stake. This was a monumental decision impacting the entire country, legalizing abortions nationwide. The court's decision was decided and based on the three different trimesters in pregnancy. The ruling allowed for women to have the choice to have an abortion in the first trimester, without any government regulation. Once a woman enters the second trimester, the government would be allowed to regulate any abortions. The government's interference at this stage does not mean that abortions are banned, but that they have the power to decide if a woman should be able to get an abortion if her health is at stake. Once a woman enters the third trimester, the state has the authority to approve or deny a woman having an abortion. This decision by the state is based on whether the fetus can survive outside the womb. If it can, then the state will not approve of the abortion unless the mother's life and/or health is at stake.

Roe v. Wade has had a major impact on the United States abortion rights movement. Before this Supreme Court case, some women had to resort to having unsafe and illegal abortions that could cost them their health or lives. This case allowed women to have more of a choice in deciding to have an abortion or not. Since its ruling, states have been creating laws that make it difficult for women to have the choice to get an abortion.

== Organizations and individuals ==
The abortion rights movement includes a variety of organizations, with no single centralized decision-making body. Many more individuals who are not members of these organizations also support their views and arguments.

Planned Parenthood, Reproductive Freedom for All, the National Abortion Federation, the National Organization for Women, and the American Civil Liberties Union are the leading abortion-rights advocacy and lobbying groups in the United States. Most major feminist organizations also support abortion-rights positions, as do the American Medical Association, the American Congress of Obstetricians and Gynecologists, and pro-abortion rights physicians such as Eugene Gu and Warren Hern who have fought political opposition from anti-abortion Senator Marsha Blackburn. Faith-based groups that advocate for abortion rights include notably the Religious Coalition for Reproductive Choice and Catholics for Choice.

=== Planned Parenthood ===
Planned Parenthood was founded on October 16, 1916, in Brownsville, New York City, New York. This organization was created so that women could have access to healthcare services and information that could help them live strong and healthy lives. Planned Parenthood is important to the United States abortion rights movement because their members are advocates for abortion access, as they believe that it is a healthcare right. Some of the issues surrounding abortion that this organization are advocating against include bans on abortion at 20 weeks, bans on abortions at 6 weeks, and the Hyde Amendment.

On July 1, 1976, the Planned Parenthood v. Danforth case was taken to the United States Supreme Court. The Planned Parenthood of Central Missouri, Dr. David Hall, and Dr. Michael Freiman challenged a Missouri law for abortion, known as House Bill 1211. Bill 1211 regulated that women who were married had to receive consent from their husband for an abortion, or consent from the parents if they were a minor and not married. Attorney Frank Susman represented Planned Parenthood in the case. Hall, Freiman, Susman, and Planned Parenthood argued against House Bill 1211 and its definition of viability. They argued that it gave a vague definition of viability that allowed for any fetus to be considered viable, essentially making abortions illegal. It was also argued that the passage of House Bill 1211 was targeting specifically individuals who wanted an abortion by requiring consent from the husband or parents for abortions, but not for other medical procedures. Frank Susman also challenged the ban on saline amniocentesis, a procedure to induce abortions, and the regulation of doctors who performed abortions. This regulation required that the doctor care for the fetus as if it were delivered normally to save its life. John Danforth, who was the general attorney for Missouri in the case, argued that the Missouri law, House Bill 1211, was constitutional. His views were that the consent allowed for the women to properly understand and make a cautious decision about the abortion.

The Court came to a decision and kept some parts of House Bill 1211, while omitting others. The definition of fetal viability and the recordkeeping requirements were upheld. The Court decided to omit the requirement of written consent for the procedure, the requirement of doctors to care for the fetus after the abortion as if it was a conventional delivery, and the ban of saline amniocentesis.

Other than Planned Parenthood's advocacy efforts for the abortion rights movement, their members also provide information at their clinics and website for the public. Regarding abortions, they provide information for people who may be considering abortions, information on the abortion pill, where to find abortion clinics and what to expect when experiencing abortions.

=== NARAL Pro-Choice America ===
The NARAL Pro-Choice America Foundation advocates for access to abortion, birth control, and paid parental leave, and against discrimination toward pregnant women. Their members provide education about the adverse effects of policies that go against a woman's choice, advocate for the group's policies, and advocate voting for government officials who support those policies. Another sector of this organization, NARAL Pro-Choice America PAC, focuses on endorsing political candidates who are pro-choice and willing to defend the right to abortion.

The NARAL Pro-Choice America Foundation advocates against targeted regulation of abortion providers (TRAP) laws, legislative restriction on access to abortions, and abortion refusal laws. They also have been a part of successful campaigns that included support for the EACH Woman Act and Whole Woman's Health v. Hellerstedt. The EACH Woman Act is legislation that was created to eliminate the Hyde amendment. This amendment prohibits women on government health care programs, such as Medicaid, from receiving funds to pay for an abortion. In support of the EACH Woman act, the NARAL Pro-Choice Foundation gathered petition signatures. In the Supreme Court case Whole Woman's Health v. Hellerstedt, the NARAL Pro-Choice Foundation advocated for this case. This particular case was taken to court because restrictions in Texas made it difficult for women to have access to abortions. The Court ruled that this was unconstitutional.

=== The National Abortion Federation ===
The National Abortion Federation supports providers who perform abortions with delivering patient care. Their members advocate for women to have a choice when it comes to having an abortion, ensuring quality abortion care, and providing a platform where providers and patients can share their personal experiences regarding abortions. During the COVID-19 pandemic, the National Abortion Federation advocated for abortion clinics to remain open, deeming it an essential service. The National Abortion Federation also provides a Hotline that helps patients have access to abortions and financial assistance. They provide a Patient Partnership program that allows people who have had abortions to share their personal experiences and stories to lawmakers.

=== Religious organizations in support of the abortion rights movement ===
==== Religious Coalition for Reproductive Choice ====
The Religious Coalition for Reproductive Choice (RCRC) is a national nonprofit organization that was founded in 1973 shortly following the Roe v. Wade ruling. Founders of the Coalition included clergy and lay leaders from many mainstream religions. Many of these leaders had previously helped women find abortion services before the Supreme Court's ruling.

The organization's website provides several resources to people in need. Four specific issues of interest are listed and delved into: the moral case, reproductive health, reproductive rights, and reproductive justice. Beyond this, the organization offers religious resources and services to those who are considering or recovering from an abortion, as well as clinics and practitioners. Some services that are offered include clinic blessings, workshops, "Compassion School", and advocacy. Several states have a state-level coalition with varying amounts of resources:

- Colorado has a website dedicated to RCRC called Colorado Religious Coalition for Reproductive Choice. Apart from having similar resources as the parent website, the Colorado RCRC website offers "all options counseling" with a promise to help all pregnant women who are seeking advice
- Kentucky has a website dedicated to RCRC called Kentucky Religious Coalition for Reproductive Choice. Here, the organization shares important updates on the EMW Clinic, the state's only remaining abortion clinic. KRCRC is one of many organizations that continuously advocates to keep the clinic's doors open. Volunteers from the organization also provide escorting to people who are utilizing the clinic's services.
- Minnesota does not have an independent for RCRC, but there is a Facebook group dedicated to the cause. It is titled "Minnesota Religious Coalition for Reproductive Choice" and focuses on many of the same issues that the parent RCRC organization highlights.
- New Mexico has a website specifically dedicated to its state RCRC. In addition to the resources offered by the parent website, New Mexico also offers letters of support from clergy members and an abortion fund to assist those who cannot afford the procedure. NMRCRC also lists volunteer opportunities such as being a legal observer or a patient host and/or driver.
- Ohio's independent RCRC website is called Ohio Religious Coalition for Reproductive Choice. The organization focuses on the same general goals as its parent organization as well as bringing local issues to light. Ohio RCRC highlights issues such as sidewalk harassment (people against abortion lobbying outside of abortion clinics) and provides resources such as abortion care packages and patient advocates.
- The Pennsylvania RCRC website includes a list of clergy members from all across the state who support the organization. It also provides a link to the parent website and several songs and prayers for reproductive justice.
- Wisconsin's RCRC does not have a website, but its supporters have organized a Facebook group titled "Wisconsin Religious Coalition for Reproductive Choice". Here, members share articles that highlight issues that are of interest to the organization.
- California, Connecticut, Illinois, Indiana, Nebraska, and Oklahoma also have coalitions, but these states do not have websites or Facebook groups dedicated to their state coalitions.

==== Catholics for Choice ====
Catholics for Choice is a nonprofit that supports reproductive freedom, including abortion rights. The organization asserts that abortion is a matter that should be decided by the individual's own conscience. Members of the organization push for abortion services to be available to everyone so people have the ability to make that choice. The organization also asserts that the majority of U.S. Catholics view abortion as a social justice value, not a religious value.

==== Reform Judaism ====
Reform Judaism openly advocates for the right to safe and accessible abortion and contraception.

==== Unitarian Universalism ====
The Unitarian Universalist Church strongly supports abortion rights. In 1978, the Unitarian Universalist Association passed a resolution that declared, "...[the] right to choice on contraception and abortion are important aspects of the right of privacy, respect for human life, and freedom of conscience of women and their families". The Association had released earlier statements in 1963 and 1968 favoring the reform of restrictive abortion laws.

== See also ==
- United States abortion protests (2022–present)
- Abortion fund
- Clinic escort
- George Tiller
- Religion and abortion
