= LWC =

LWC may refer to:

- Last White Christmas, Italian punk/hard core festival
- Lawrence Municipal Airport (Kansas), IATA code
- Ling Wancheng
- Liquid water content of a cloud
- Local Weightlifting Committee in USA Weightlifting
- Lord Wandsworth College, Hampshire, England
- Louder with Crowder, a show featuring American-Canadian conservative commentator Steven Crowder
- Lutheran Women's Caucus, US
- Language of wider communication, the lingua franca of a region
- LWC Super Champ, televised Muay Thai competition
