= National Mobilization for Reproductive Justice =

Activist Coalition for Reproductive Justice

The National Mobilization for Reproductive Justice (NMRJ) is a coalition of grassroots organizations and unions supporting reproductive rights, particularly after the 2022 overturn of Roe v. Wade in the United States. The coalition was initiated by Radical Women in August 2021 and has local committees throughout the US. It is currently focusing on an effort to get the AFL-CIO to organize a national emergency labor conference to build defense of reproductive justice.

== Organizing history ==
=== 2021 ===
After its initiation in August 2021, the NMRJ's first major action was a coordinated set of vigils, rallies, walks, and talks on October 3, 2021—exactly 44 years after the death of Rosie Jiménez, the first person known to die of an abortion following passage of the Hyde Amendment in 1977, which prevents Medicaid funds being used for abortion. These events took place in Arizona, California, Colorado, Illinois, Minnesota, New Mexico, New York, Oregon, Tennessee, and Washington.

A few months afterwards, Dobbs v. Jackson Women's Health Organization was argued before the U.S. Supreme Court, sparking more actions from NMRJ on December 1, 2021, in Arizona, California, District of Columbia, New York, and Washington.

=== 2022 ===
The NMRJ organized events for the 49th anniversary of the Roe v. Wade decision on January 22, 2022. These took place in Arizona, California, Illinois, New York, and Washington.

The group had just participated in labor and immigrant marches for International Workers' Day on May 1, 2022 when the draft decision on Dobbs v. Jackson Women's Health Organization was leaked on May 2, 2022. This then ignited more protests and planning for actions to take place on the day the Supreme Court decision was announced.

When the Dobbs v. Jackson Women's Health Organization decision was officially handed down on June 24, 2022, the NMRJ organized protests with civil disobedience in a number of states including Arizona, California, New York, and Washington.

A year after its initiation, the NMRJ held events once again for Rosie Jiménez on October 1, 2022.

=== 2023 ===
On January 21 and 22, 2023, the NMRJ organized rallies, protests, and counter-protests, on the 50th anniversary of Roe v. Wade which had been struck down by the Dobbs v. Jackson Women's Health Organization decision. Some of these actions were documented in California, New York, and Washington. The same month in Phoenix, NMRJ members and queer activists participated in a rally in support of LGBTQ+ people and opposing anti-trans and anti-drag legislation before the Arizona government.
