= Executive Order 13535 =

2010 United States executive order

Executive Order 13535 is an executive order announced by President Barack Obama on March 21, 2010, and signed on March 24, 2010. It reinforces a commitment to preservation of the Hyde Amendment's policy restricting federal funds for abortion within the context of recent health care legislation. The order was signed after an agreement with anti-abortion Democratic Congressman Bart Stupak, who had said he and several other anti-abortion Democrats in the House of Representatives would not support the Patient Protection and Affordable Care Act unless the Bill's language prohibiting federal funding of abortions was strengthened.

The executive order was condemned as ineffective by major anti-abortion organizations, including the Susan B. Anthony List, the National Right to Life Committee, the United States Conference of Catholic Bishops, Family Research Council, the American Family Association, Focus on the Family, and Americans United for Life, among others. The organizations said executive orders can be rescinded at any time by any administration. They also said the fact that an executive order was needed proves that the health care law did fund abortion. The National Right to Life Committee said the executive order did not correct seven provisions in the law they identified as objectionable.

Pro-abortion rights groups also condemned the executive order, questioning Obama's commitment to the pro-abortion rights position. The National Organization for Women, Planned Parenthood, NARAL Pro-Choice America, and EMILY's List were among pro-abortion rights groups opposing the executive order.
