= Christian views on abortion =

Christian denominational views on the issue of abortion

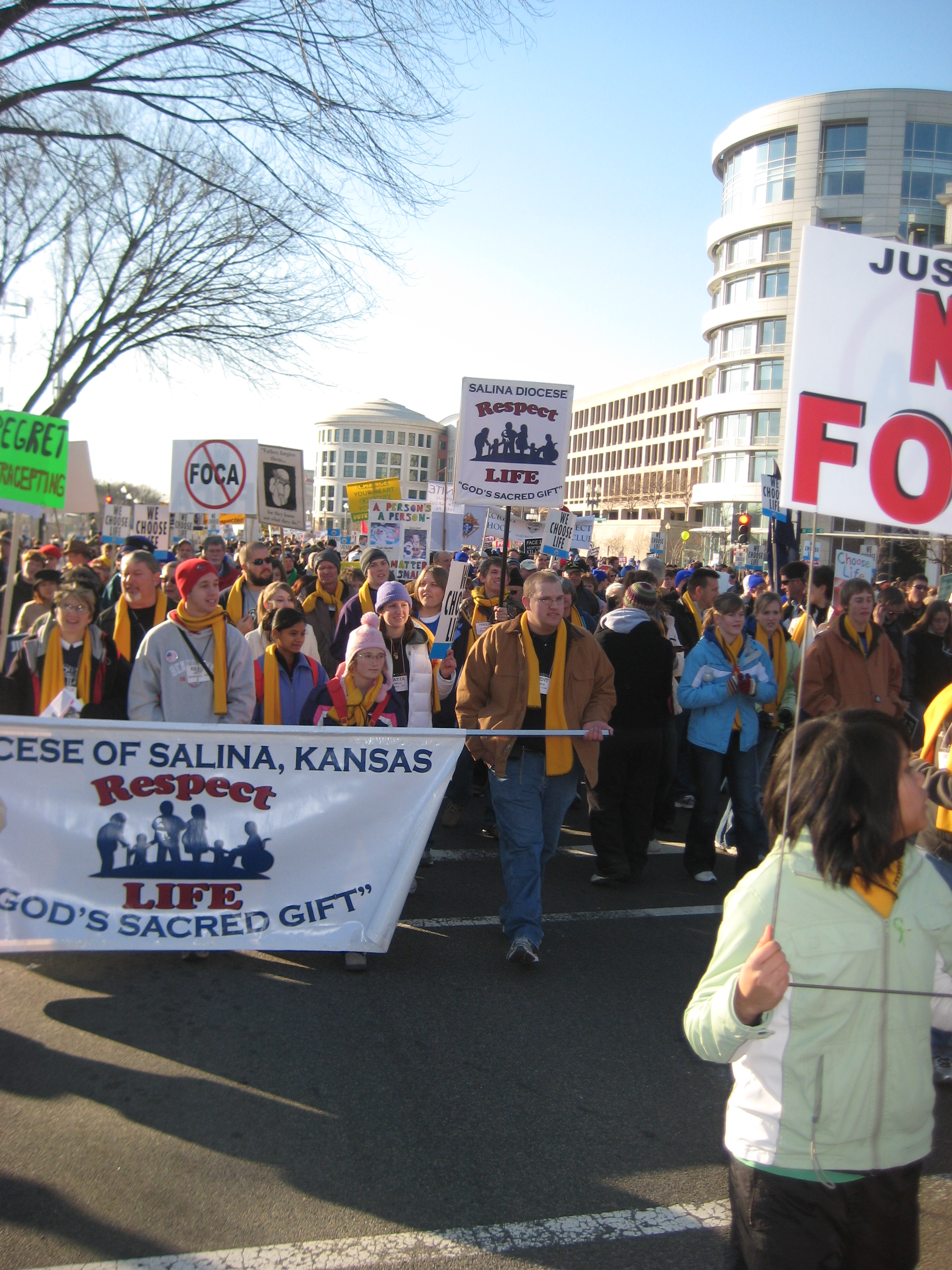
Christians at the 2009 March for Life

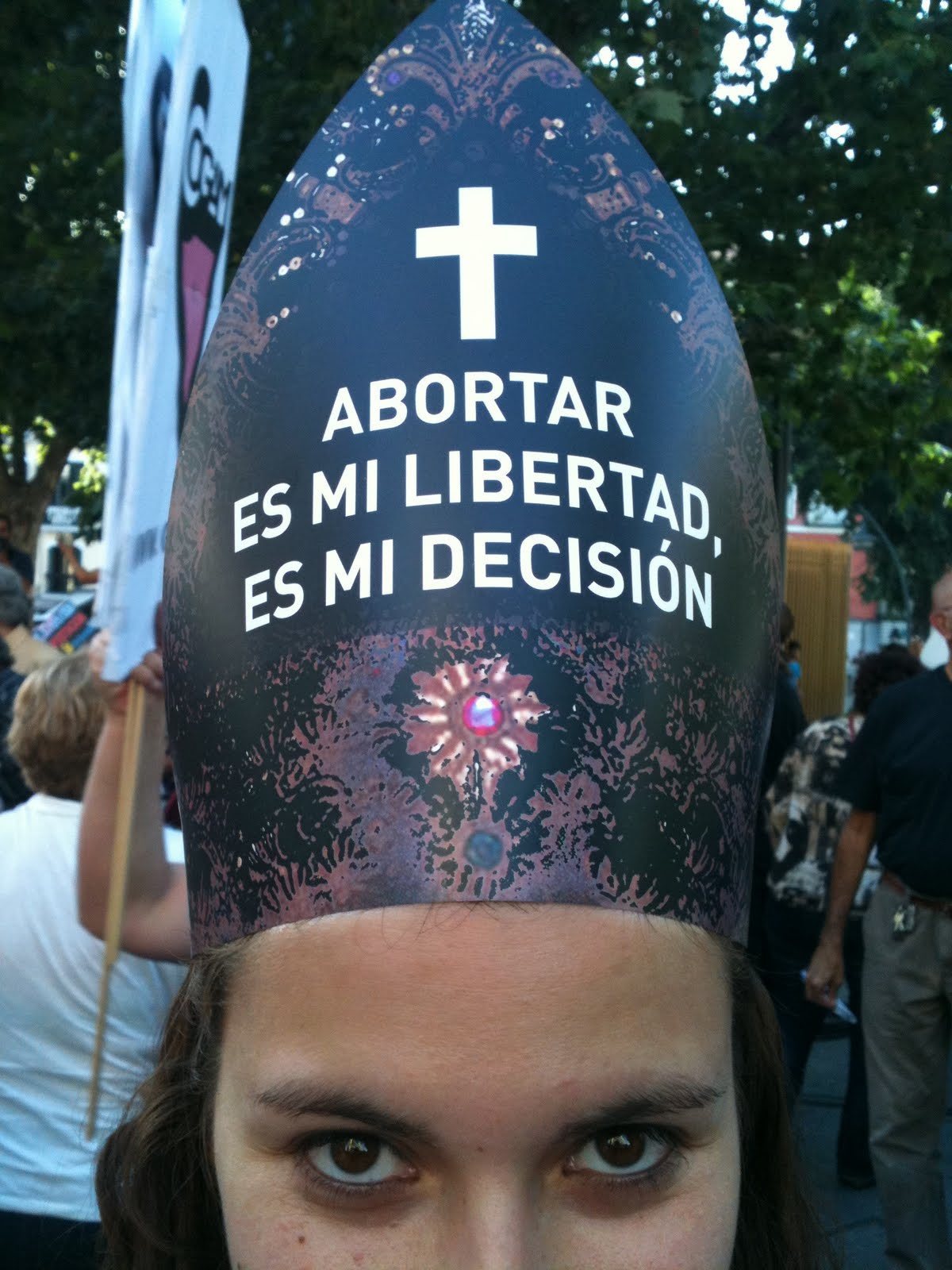
An abortion-rights campaigner in Spain voicing disagreement with the Catholic view on abortion during the Pope's visit

Christianity and abortion have a long and complex history. Condemnation of abortion by Christians goes back to the 1st century with texts such as the Didache, the Epistle of Barnabas, and the Apocalypse of Peter. In later centuries some Christian writers argued that abortion was acceptable under certain circumstances, such as when necessary to save the life of the mother, but these views did not become accepted teachings until some denominations changed their views in the 20th century. The Bible itself does not contain direct references to abortion.

Today, Christian denominations hold widely variant stances: Most mainline Protestant denominations support abortion legalization, while Catholicism, Evangelicalism and Eastern Orthodoxy condemn abortion under almost all circumstances.

== Range of positions taken by Christian denominations ==
Stances on abortion rights vary between different denominations, with some opposing abortion while others believe it should be permitted, and between followers of respective denominations, with sizable minorities within each that disagree with their denomination's stance on abortion.

Some denominations–mainly European-generated Protestant denominations–have amended their stance on abortion, with religious leaders in more liberal Christian denominations becoming supporters of abortion rights while Evangelical and other conservative Christians still staunchly oppose abortion, a view that is shared by the Catholic Church.

Christians and scholars also disagree on how abortion has been perceived historically. While some writers say that early Christians held different beliefs at different times about abortion, others claim that abortion has always been condemned at any point of pregnancy as a grave sin. Daniel Schiff maintains that some early Christians did not view as homicide the elimination of a fetus not yet "formed" and animated by a human soul.

=== Biblical passages ===
A number of biblical passages are often cited by Christians on either side of the abortion question. Some frequently cited ones and common arguments surrounding them are as follows:

Selected Bible verses and perspectives
Passage	Perspective allowing abortion	Perspective against abortion
Genesis 2:7 (Garden of Eden narrative, see also Soul in the Bible § Genesis 2:7) - "Then the LORD (Yahweh) (Note: Yahweh's name, written as 'YHWH' in the Hebrew Bible, has traditionally been rendered in English as the LORD (Adonai) or God by Jews and Christians. See Names of God in Judaism and Names of God in Christianity.) God formed a man from the dust of the ground and breathed into his nostrils the breath of life, and the man became a living being". (NIV)	Christian advocates of abortion rights cite this passage as proof that human personhood begins once the "breath of life" enters the body; lungs of a fetus are not considered fully-functioning until around 37 weeks gestation and cannot breathe until birth.	Opponents of legalized abortion reject this interpretation and say that Adam and Eve, having been fully formed as adults, should not be compared to a fetus.
Exodus 21:22–25 (Harm to a pregnant woman, see Mishpatim § Exodus chapters 21–22 at "Harm to a Pregnant Woman" for parallels in other Ancient Near Eastern legal texts): "When men have a fight and hurt a pregnant woman, so that she suffers a miscarriage, but no further injury, the guilty one shall be fined as much as the woman's husband demands of him, and he shall pay in the presence of the judges. But if injury ensues, you shall give life for life, eye for eye, tooth for tooth, hand for hand, foot for foot, burn for burn, wound for wound, stripe for stripe." (NAB)	Christians who are in favour of legalized abortion cite this passage because it shows that when a woman suffers miscarriage from a blow during a fight, only a fine is required in compensation, while if the woman is injured or killed, then the punishment must be equal to the injury suffered, including capital punishment if the woman dies. According to abortion rights advocates, the significance of this Biblical passage is that causing a woman to miscarry "warrants financial compensation only (to her husband), suggesting that the fetus is property, not a person."	Christians who are against legalized abortion, however, argue that this passage still represents the causing of a miscarriage as sinful.They also claim that the arguments in favor of abortion are based on a mistranslation of the Hebrew-language text in Exodus 21, and that the verse actually refers to premature birth rather than miscarriage.
Numbers 5:11–31 (Ordeal of the bitter water) -- Numbers 5:27: 'Once she has done so, if she has been impure and unfaithful to her husband, this bitter water that brings a curse will go into her, and her belly will swell and her thighs will waste away, so that she will become an example of imprecation among her people.' (NAB)	In this passage, a woman who is suspected of adultery is made to drink something that will cause her thigh to waste away and her belly to swell if she was guilty of adultery. Christians who support legalized abortion believe that this is talking about the woman's fetus being destroyed if she was guilty of adultery with another man.	Christians against legalized abortion, however, argue that this passage is not referring to an abortion and that the effects on the woman's body refer to a divine punishment for oathbreaking in Jewish tradition. The practice is also not believed to have been practiced in Christianity. It was also undertaken by both Men and Women as a test for adultery.
Jeremiah 1:5 (calling of Jeremiah narrative): "Before I formed you in the womb I knew you, before you were born I dedicated you, a prophet to the nations I appointed you." (NAB)	Christians who support legalized abortion, however, have argued that this passage refers only to Jeremiah alone and explains his uniqueness by saying that God made plans for him even before he was born. They say that this passage is "a reference to a special plan for one man rather than a general approach to biology and reproduction."	Christians opposed to legalized abortion have interpreted this passage to mean that life begins prior to birth, thus making abortion the taking of a person's life.
Luke 1:15 (in the prologue, featuring John the Baptist's parents): "For he shall be great before the Lord; and shall drink no wine nor strong drink: and he shall be filled with the Holy Ghost, even from his mother's womb." (KJV); and Luke 1:41–44 (in the Visitation narrative): "[41] And it came to pass, that when Elizabeth heard the salutation of Mary, the infant leaped in her womb. And Elizabeth was filled with the Holy Ghost: [42] And she cried out with a loud voice, and said: Blessed art thou among women, and blessed is the fruit of thy womb. [43] And whence is this to me, that the mother of my Lord should come to me? [44] For behold as soon as the voice of thy salutation sounded in my ears, the infant in my womb leaped for joy." (KJV)	As in the case of the passage from Jeremiah, supporters of abortion rights argue that this passage explains the uniqueness of John the Baptist and does not say anything about other fetal life. They also maintain that passages that relate to the later stages of pregnancy are not relevant to the general abortion question, because the vast majority of abortions occur early in pregnancy, before "quickening" (when the woman first feels movement of the fetus) or "ensoulment" (when the fetus is "formed" or "ensouled" according to ancient beliefs). In early times, true pregnancy was usually interpreted as beginning at quickening or ensoulment.	Christians opposed to legalized abortion point to these verses dealing with Elizabeth's pregnancy with her son (the future John the Baptist) as showing that the fetus was a person, because the fetus was filled with the Holy Spirit in his mother's womb and leaped for joy at the sound of Mary's salutation. The Greek word used in line 44 'βρέφος' (Brephos) is also used for infants after birth and it was used by the gospel writer in describing the baby Jesus in Bethlehem in the second chapter of Luke.

== Catholic Church ==
The Catholic Church states that its opposition to abortion follows from a belief that human life begins at conception and that "human life must be respected and protected absolutely from the moment of conception." Accordingly, it opposes procedures whose purpose is to destroy an embryo or fetus for whatever motive (even before implantation), but admits acts, such as chemotherapy or hysterectomy of a pregnant woman who has cervical cancer, which indirectly result in the death of the fetus. The Church holds that "the first right of the human person is his life" and that life is assumed to begin at fertilization. Can. 1397 §2 states: "A person who actually procures an abortion incurs a latae sententiae excommunication" Before the apostolic constitution Pascite gregem Dei, issued by Pope Francis on 1 June 2021, which reforms Book VI of the 1983 Code of Canon Law, the content related to this topic was contained in canon 1398. The excommunication from the Church can only be removed when that individual seeks penance and obtains absolution. The Church has affirmed that every procured abortion is a moral evil, a teaching that the Catechism of the Catholic Church declares "has not changed and remains unchangeable" since the first century. However, this claim of consistency of the Church on the question of abortion is disputed by a number of historians, such as John Connery, Ann Hibner Koblitz, Angus McLaren, and John Riddle. Until 1869, with the exception of the three-year period 1588–1591 during the papacy of Sixtus V, the Church treated abortion before quickening as less serious than abortion after quickening. The leading early Catholic theologians placed the time when an embryo took form as a human and could receive a soul as between 40 and 80 days; termination of pregnancy before 40 days was a "considerably lesser offense" than a later abortion.

With the papal bull Apostolicae Sedis moderationi of 1869, Pope Pius IX, without making a distinction about the stage of pregnancy, listed as subject to an excommunication from which only a bishop could grant absolution those who effectively procured an abortion. The authors of one book have interpreted this as "Pius IX declared all direct abortions homicide", but the document merely declared that those who procured an effective abortion incurred excommunication reserved to bishops or ordinaries. In 1895, the Church specifically condemned therapeutic abortions.

Apart from indicating in its canon law that automatic excommunication such as that laid down for procurement of a completed abortion does not apply to women who abort because of a direct threat to the life of a mother if her pregnancy continues or indeed of any grave fear or grave inconvenience, the Catholic Church assures the possibility of forgiveness for women who have had an abortion without any such attenuation. Pope John Paul II wrote:

I would now like to say a special word to women who have had an abortion. The Church is aware of the many factors which may have influenced your decision, and she does not doubt that in many cases it was a painful and even shattering decision. The wound in your heart may not yet have healed. Certainly what happened was and remains terribly wrong. But do not give in to discouragement and do not lose hope. Try rather to understand what happened and face it honestly. If you have not already done so, give yourselves over with humility and trust to repentance. The Father of mercies is ready to give you his forgiveness and his peace in the Sacrament of Reconciliation.

Many, and in some Western countries most, lay Catholics hold different positions on abortion than those officially promulgated by the Church; the views of these people range from generally anti-abortion positions allowing some exceptions, to more general acceptance of abortion.

=== Politics ===
==== Anti-legal abortion organizing ====
Connie Paige has been quoted as having said that, "the Roman Catholic Church created the right-to-life movement. Without the church, the movement would not exist as such today."

==== National Conference of Catholic Bishops, 1968–1973 ====
The National Conference of Catholic Bishops selected James Thomas McHugh, administrator of the United States Catholic Conference's Family Life Bureau, and during 1967 to organize its National Right to Life Committee (NRLC). The National Right to Life Committee was formed in 1968 under the auspices of the National Conference of Catholic Bishops to coordinate information and strategy between emerging state anti-abortion groups. These groups were forming in response to efforts to change abortion laws based on model legislation proposed by the American Law Institute (ALI). New Jersey attorney Juan Ryan served as the organization's first president. NRLC held a nationwide meeting of anti-abortion leaders in Chicago in 1970 at Barat College. The following year, NRLC held its first convention at Macalestar College in St. Paul, Minnesota. From 1968 to 1971, the organization published a newsletter that informed member organizations about abortion-related legislation in the states.

==== NRLC Incorporation, Human Life Amendment ====
When the NRLC was formally incorporated in May 1973 in response to the US Supreme Court Roe v. Wade decision (which struck down most state laws in the United States restricting abortion in the first trimester of pregnancy), the National Conference of Catholic Bishops launched into a campaign to amend the United States Constitution with the enactment of a Human Life Amendment seeking not only to overturn the Roe v. Wade decision, but to also forbid both Congress and the states from legalizing abortion within the United States. Its first convention as an incorporated organization was held the following month in Detroit, Michigan. At the concurrent meeting of NRLC's board, Ed Golden of New York was elected president. Among the organization's founding members was Dr. Mildred Jefferson, the first African-American woman to graduate from Harvard Medical School. Jefferson subsequently served as president of the organization. Conventions have been held in various cities around the country every summer since the Detroit convention.

Following incorporation in 1973, the committee began publishing National Right to Life News. The newsletter has been in continuous publication since November 1973 and is now published daily online as the news and commentary feed, National Right To Life News Today.

==== Withholding communion ====
Many controversies have arisen over its treatment of Catholic politicians who support abortion rights. In some cases, bishops have threatened to withhold communion to such politicians; in others, bishops have urged politicians in this situation to refrain from receiving communion. In a few cases, such as the case of Mario Cuomo, the possibility of excommunication has been considered.

== Eastern Orthodox Church ==
The Eastern Orthodox Church believes that life begins at conception, and that abortion (including the use of abortifacient drugs) is the taking of a human life. The Basis of the Social Concept of the Russian Orthodox Church states that, if it is because of a direct threat to her life that a woman interrupts her pregnancy, especially if she already has other children, she is not to be excommunicated from the church because of this sin, which however she must confess to a priest and fulfill the penance that he assigns:

In case of a direct threat to the life of a mother if her pregnancy continues, especially if she has other children, it is recommended to be lenient in the pastoral practice. The woman who interrupted pregnancy in this situation shall not be excluded from the Eucharistic communion with the Church provided that she has fulfilled the canon of Penance assigned by the priest who takes her confession.

The document also acknowledges that abortions often are a result of poverty and helplessness and that the Church and society should "work out effective measures to protect motherhood."

== Church of Jesus Christ of Latter-day Saints ==
The Church of Jesus Christ of Latter-day Saints (LDS Church) opposes elective abortions "for personal or social convenience". It also states that abortion is an acceptable option in cases of rape, incest, danger to the health or life of the mother, or where the fetus will not survive beyond birth. In a 2023 US-wide PRRI poll that included 402 LDS-identifying respondents, 30% said abortion should be legal in all or most cases, and 69% said it should be illegal in all or most cases. The church has no official position on when life begins, but does state that ordinances such as naming and blessing children and sealing them to their parents are not needed for stillborn or miscarried children.

== Jehovah's Witnesses ==
Jehovah's Witnesses hold a strong anti-abortion stance, based on their interpretation of the Bible, and view abortion as a serious sin tantamount to murder.

They believe that deliberately inducing an abortion where the "sole purpose of which is to avoid the birth of an unwanted child" is an "act of high crime" in the eyes of God. In the case of the mother's life being at risk, Jehovah's Witnesses suggest the mother needs to make a "personal decision about which life to save".

A baptized member who has an abortion is told to turn to God in prayer, and demonstrate repentance. If the elders decide that the individual is not repentant, she may be shunned. However, if the mother is deemed to be repentant, she may be formally reproved, imposing restrictions (such as being prohibited from commenting during meetings or conducting group prayers).

== Protestant denominations ==
In the twentieth century, the debate over the morality of abortion became one of several issues which divided and continue to divide Protestantism. Thus, Protestant views on abortion vary considerably with Protestants to be found in both the "anti-abortion" and "abortion-rights" camps. Conservative Protestants tend to be anti-abortion whereas mainline Protestants lean towards an abortion-rights stance. The Black Protestant community is strongly pro-choice, with 71% supporting legal access to abortion in all or most cases, while only 25% believe abortion should be illegal in all or most cases. Black Protestant support for legal access to abortion has risen since the Dobbs decision, including 65% of Black evangelicals who support legal access to abortion and 80% of non-evangelical Black Protestants.

Former Southern Baptist Convention President W.A. Criswell (1969–1970) welcomed Roe v. Wade, saying that ""I have always felt that it was only after a child was born and had a life separate from its mother that it became an individual person," the redoubtable fundamentalist declared, "and it has always, therefore, seemed to me that what is best for the mother and for the future should be allowed." This was a common attitude among evangelicals at the time. Criswell would later reverse himself on his earlier position.

Even among Protestants who believe that abortion should be a legal option, there are those who believe that it should nonetheless be morally unacceptable in most instances. This stance was expressed by former President Bill Clinton when he asserted that abortion should be "safe, legal and rare." Other Protestants, most notably the Evangelicals, have sought to sharply restrict the conditions under which abortion is legally available. At the other extreme, some Protestants support freedom of choice and assert that abortion should not only be legal but even morally acceptable in certain circumstances.

Protestant supporters of abortion rights include the United Church of Christ, the Episcopal Church, the Presbyterian Church (USA), and the Lutheran Women's Caucus. At its 2016 General Conference, the United Methodist Church voted by a margin of 425 to 268 to withdraw from the Religious Coalition for Reproductive Choice. The vote reflects a growing conservative tide on social issues among United Methodists, including abortion.

In the United States, the Reformed Church in the United States, Southern Baptist Convention and Assemblies of God USA are opposed to abortion, except when necessary to protect the life of the mother.

=== Fundamentalist and evangelical movements ===
Despite their general opposition to abortion, fundamentalist churches that include the conservative evangelical, non-denominational, Independent Baptist and Pentecostal movements, do not have a consensus doctrine regarding abortion. While these movements hold in common that abortion (when there is no threat to the life of the mother) is a form of infanticide, there is no consensus as to whether exceptions should be allowed when the mother's life is in mortal danger, or when the pregnancy resulted from rape or incest. Some argue that the lives of both the mother and fetus should be given equal consideration, in effect condemning all abortion including those performed to save the life of the mother. Others argue for exceptions which favor the life of the mother, perhaps including pregnancies resulting from cases of rape or incest.

=== National (United States) Association of Evangelicals ===
The National Association of Evangelicals includes the Salvation Army, the Assemblies of God, and the Church of God, among others, and takes an anti-abortion stance. While there is no set doctrine among member churches on if or when abortion is appropriate in cases of rape or incest, or to save the life of the mother, the NAE's position on abortion states, "...abortion on demand for reasons of personal convenience, social adjustment or economic advantage is morally wrong, and [the NEA] expresses its firm opposition to any legislation designed to make abortion possible for these reasons."

=== Baptist churches ===
==== American Baptist Churches ====
The General Board of the American Baptist Churches in the U.S.A. opposes abortion "as a means of avoiding responsibility for conception, as a primary means of birth control, and without regard for the far-reaching consequences of the act." There is no agreement on when personhood begins, whether there are situations that allow for abortion, whether there should be laws to protect the life of embryos and whether laws should allow women the right to choose an abortion.

==== Southern Baptist Convention ====
Southern Baptists played an integral part in the pro-choice movement prior to 1980. During the 1971 Southern Baptist Convention, the delegates passed a resolution recognizing that "Christians in the American society today are faced with difficult decisions about abortion", stating that laws should recognize the "sanctity of human life, including fetal life", and calling upon Southern Baptists to work for laws allowing abortion in extreme cases such as rape, severe fetal deformity, and the health of the mother. The stance was described in the media as "hedging" on abortion and a resolution opposing all abortions was defeated. W. Barry Garrett wrote in the Baptist Press, "Religious liberty, human equality and justice are advanced by the [Roe v. Wade] Supreme Court Decision." In 1980, the SBC revised their 1971 position by only making exceptions for the life of the mother.

Today, the Southern Baptist Convention, the largest Protestant denomination in the United States, opposes elective abortion except to save the life of the mother. The Southern Baptist Convention calls on Southern Baptists to work to change the laws in order to make abortion illegal in most cases. Richard Land, president of the Southern Baptist Convention's Ethics and Religious Liberty Commission from 1988 to 2013, said that he believes abortion is more damaging than anything else, even poverty.

=== Anglican Communion ===
Positions taken by Anglicans across the world are divergent and often nuanced.

==== The Church of England ====
The Church of England generally opposes abortion. In 1980 it stated that: "In the light of our conviction that the foetus has the right to live and develop as a member of the human family, we see abortion, the termination of that life by the act of man, as a great moral evil. We do not believe that the right to life, as a right pertaining to persons, admits of no exceptions whatever; but the right of the innocent to life admits surely of few exceptions indeed." The Church also recognizes that in some instances abortion is "morally preferable to any available alternative."

==== The Episcopal Church ====
The Episcopal Church in the United States of America has taken a nuanced position and has passed resolutions at its triannual General Convention. "General Convention resolutions have expressed unequivocal opposition to any legislation abridging a woman's right to make an informed decision about the termination of pregnancy, as well as the pain and possible support that may be needed for those making difficult life decisions." The Episcopal Church also condemns violence against abortion clinics. However, the Church has stated that it is morally opposed to "abortion as a means of birth control, family planning, sex selection, or any reason of mere convenience.”

==== The Anglican Church of Australia ====
The Anglican Church of Australia does not take an official position on abortion. However, in December 2007, an all-woman committee representing the Melbourne diocese recommended that abortion be "decriminalised", on the basis of the ethical view that "the moral significance [of the embryo] increases with the age and development of the foetus". This is seen to be the first approval of abortion by an official Australian Anglican group.

=== Lutheran Churches ===
Lutheranism in the United States consists largely of three denominations: the Evangelical Lutheran Church in America (4.5 million members), the Lutheran Church–Missouri Synod (2.3 million members), and the Wisconsin Evangelical Lutheran Synod (0.4 million members).

==== Evangelical Lutheran Church in America ====
"Because of our conviction that both the life of the woman and the life in her womb must be respected by law, this church opposes:

- the total lack of regulation of abortion;
- legislation that would outlaw abortion in all circumstances;
- laws that prevent access to information about all options available to women faced with unintended pregnancies;
- laws that deny access to safe and affordable services for morally justifiable abortions;
- mandatory or coerced abortion or sterilization;
- laws that prevent couples from practicing contraception;
- laws that are primarily intended to harass those contemplating or deciding for an abortion"

==== The Lutheran Church–Missouri Synod ====
The Lutheran Church–Missouri Synod (LCMS) views abortion as contrary to God's Word. The church has stated that abortion "is not a moral option, except as a tragically unavoidable byproduct of medical procedures necessary to prevent the death of another human being, viz., the mother." The LCMS believes that whether abortion is legal or not, it does not change the fact that abortion is a sin. On the topic of whether abortion is allowed in the case of rape or incest, the LCMS has stated that though there are many "emotional arguments for abortion... the fact of the matter is that it is wrong to take the life of one innocent victim (the unborn child)...It is indeed a strange logic that would have us kill an innocent unborn baby for the crime of his father."

==== Wisconsin Evangelical Lutheran Synod ====
The Wisconsin Evangelical Lutheran Synod adopted a resolution in July 2011 on social issues, where it includes the twofold approach:

1. "Encouraging the WELS ministerium to continue the faithful proclamation of God's Word also when it addresses social issues."
2. "Encouraging the membership to be a positive influence in the battle against sin by their public testimony and vote."

In this resolution of social issues, a resolution of the topic of abortion has been included. Within it, on the topic of abortion, the WELS continues to express its commitment to the Holy Scriptures and believes that the Holy Scriptures "clearly testify to a reverence for the life of the mother and the life of her unborn child as both being equal in value." Furthermore, the intentional termination of a life should be considered a sin because the WELS would consider the unborn a life and the Bible commands against murder. On the issue of the endangering the mother's life during the pregnancy, the WELS states that effort to save both the mother's and baby's life, but if that is not possible, then there should be effort to save at least one life.

=== Methodist Churches ===
==== Methodist Church of Great Britain ====
The Methodist Church of Great Britain takes a moderate anti-abortion position. The Methodist Church of Great Britain believes its members should work toward the elimination of the need for abortion by advocating for social support for mothers. The MCGB states that "Abortion must not be regarded as an alternative to contraception, nor is it to be justified merely as a method of birth control. The termination of any form of human life cannot be regarded superficially and abortion should not be available on demand, but should remain subject to a legal framework, to responsible counselling and to medical judgement."

==== United Methodist Church ====
The United Methodist Church was a founding member of the Religious Coalition for Reproductive Choice in 1973. Within the Coalition's website is this statement, "Subsequently, if sex serves purposes beyond reproduction, then a woman has the legal right to both prevent and interrupt a pregnancy". In 2008 the United Methodist General Conference went on record in support of the work of the Religious Coalition for Reproductive Choice (RCRC).

In 1987 the Taskforce of United Methodists on Abortion and Sexuality (TUMAS) was formed as an unofficial anti-abortion group within the United Methodist Church. As a result of the efforts of TUMAS, on May 19, 2016, the General Conference of the United Methodist Church voted to withdraw the General Board of Church and Society and the United Methodist Women from the RCRC. However, the letter informing the RCRC of the withdrawal also stated that the United Methodist Church continues to support "the reproductive health of women and girls", and encourages the RCRC to continue its educational work, advocacy, and supportive ministries.

=== American Presbyterian and Reformed Churches ===
The Presbyterian Church (U.S.A.) generally takes a pro-choice stance. The Presbyterian Church (U.S.A.) believes that the choice to receive an elective abortion can be "morally acceptable;" however, the denomination does not condone late abortions where the fetus is viable and the mother's life is not in danger. Other Presbyterian denominations such as the Orthodox Presbyterian Church and the Presbyterian Church in America are anti-abortion. Most Reformed churches, including both the Reformed Church in America and the Christian Reformed Church in North America are anti-abortion. The earliest statement against abortion was 1972, when the Reformed Church in the United States adopted the statement “in the light of Ps. 51:6, we as a Classis take a stand against all abortion as murder except in a dire case to save a mother’s life.”

=== Quakers (The Religious Society of Friends) ===
The Religious Society of Friends generally avoids taking a stance on controversial issues such as abortion; however, in the 1970s the American Friends Service Committee advocated for abortion rights.

=== Christian Church (Disciples of Christ) ===
The Christian Church (Disciples of Christ) General Assembly has "repeatedly affirmed its support for the principles of a woman's right to reproductive freedom, of the freedom and responsibility of individual conscience, and of the sacredness of life of all persons. While advocating respect for differences of religious beliefs concerning abortion, Disciples have consistently opposed any attempts to legislate a specific religious opinion regarding abortion for all Americans."

=== United Church of Christ (UCC) ===
The United Church of Christ has strongly supported abortion rights since 1971 as a part of their Justice and Witness Ministry. The church is an organizational member of the National Abortion and Reproductive Rights Action League (NARAL).

=== Community of Christ ===
Community of Christ states they recognize that there is inadequacy in any simplistic answer that defines all abortion as murder or as a simple medical procedure, and recognize a woman's right in deciding the continuation or termination of pregnancy.

=== Church of God in Christ (COGIC) ===
As the Church of God in Christ (COGIC) is a traditionally anti-abortion Pentecostal Christian denomination, both male and female leaders and clergy of COGIC have always ardently voiced and actively taken opposition to all types of abortions, "except only in the absolutely necessary case of saving the life of the mother."

=== Seventh-day Adventist Church ===
The Seventh-day Adventist Church adopt an anti-abortion stance, albeit with some exceptions. The Church released an official statement in October 2019 on the topic of the "Biblical View of Unborn Life". The statement references various scriptures from the Bible.

=== Anglican Church in North America ===
The Anglican Church in North America formed when congregations split from the Episcopal Church in the United States and Anglican Church of Canada and aims to represent conservative Anglicanism in North America. It is not a member of the Anglican Communion and is anti-abortion, proclaiming that "all members and clergy are called to promote and respect the sanctity of every human life from conception to natural death".

== Organizations and political parties ==
Evangelical organizations like Focus on the Family are involved in the anti-abortion movements. Other political parties and organizations, particularly the Republican Party in the United States, are involved in creating, passing, and protecting restrictive abortion laws throughout the United States. Increasingly restrictive abortion regulations spread across Republican led states after the Dobbs decision returned regulation of abortion to the states. Delegates first introduced anti-abortion beliefs into the Republican Party's platform during the 1976 presidential election. These Christian right attitudes have increasingly become more popular in the party as a result, and turned abortion, a previously mostly nonpartisan issue, into a partisan issue.

Worldwide, numerous notable political parties and organizations subscribe to similar attitudes. For example, the Christian right in Canada is more boldly anti-abortion, but is much more tacit in regards to other social issues. Generally, many Conservative or centre-right parties throughout the world are varied in their opinions surrounding abortion and the rights of women, reproductive and bodily. However, many parties and organizations have religious conservative views that have created issues politically and socially around the world. However, this is not to say that there are no pro-choice advocacy groups around the world that are in favor of expanding and protecting abortion rights worldwide. For example, Catholics for Choice is a primary example prevalent in discourse within the United States. The Religious Coalition for Reproductive Choice is another example based in the United States. Both groups directly advocate for the expansion and protection of abortion rights and the right for a woman (or anyone capable of pregnancy) to reproductive healthcare, specifically arguing that the issue of abortion should be rather a personal decision than a political or social decision. However, these groups have expanded globally, and are often involved in global efforts to protect abortion rights.

== Attitudes of Christians towards abortion ==
=== Catholics ===
In a 1995 survey, 64 percent of U.S. Catholics said they disapproved of the statement that "abortion is morally wrong in every case". On the other hand, a 2013 survey by the Pew Research Center found that, whatever views they held on whether abortion should be legal, 53 percent of white Catholics in the United States considered abortion morally wrong, as did 64 percent of Hispanic Catholics. Among Hispanic Catholics, this percentage did not vary significantly between those who went to Mass at least once a week and those who did not, but there was a considerable difference in the case of white Catholics, with 74 percent of those who went to Mass at least once a week declaring having an abortion to be immoral, as compared with 40 percent of those whose religious practice was less frequent. A 2008 survey found that 65 percent of American Catholics identified themselves as "pro-choice", but also found that 76 percent of these "pro-choice" Catholics believed that abortion should be significantly restricted. In the same year some 58 percent of American Catholic women felt that they did not have to follow the abortion teaching of their bishop. Only 22 percent of U.S. Catholics held that abortion should be illegal in all cases. In a 2015 survey conducted by Pew Research Center, 33% of Evangelical Protestants believed in legalizing abortion compared to 63% who did not. 52% of Black Protestants believed in legalizing abortion, while 42% did not.

A 1996 survey found that 72 percent of Australian Catholics say that the decision to have an abortion "should be left to individual women and their doctors."

In Poland, where 85 percent of the population is Catholic, a Pew Research poll from 2017 found that 8 percent of Polish respondents believed abortion should be legal in all cases and 33 percent that it should be legal in most cases. On the other hand, 38 percent believed that it should be illegal in most cases and 13 percent that it should be illegal in all cases.

Catholics for Choice reports that Italy—97 percent Catholic—is 74 percent in favor of using Mifepristone, an abortifacient. A majority of Catholics in Bolivia, Colombia and Mexico say that abortion should be allowed in at least some circumstances.

=== Protestants ===
In a 2022 survey conducted by Pew Research Center, U.S. adults were asked if abortion should be legal in all cases, with no exceptions; 5% of White Evangelical Protestants answered yes, 13% of White Protestants, not evangelical answered yes, 20% of Black Protestants answered yes. In the same survey, U.S. adults were asked if abortion should be legal if pregnancy threatens a woman's life; 51% of White Evangelical Protestants answered yes, 77% of White Protestants, not evangelical answered yes, and 71% of Black Protestants answered yes. In response to whether abortion should be legal if pregnancy is a result of rape; 40% of White Evangelical Protestants answered yes, 75% of White Protestants, not Evangelical answered yes, and 71% of Black Protestants answered yes. In this same survey U.S. adults were asked should how long a woman has been pregnant matters in determining whether it is legal or illegal to have an abortion; 56% of White Evangelical Protestants answered yes, 64% of White Protestants, not Evangelical answered yes, 50% of Black Protestants answered yes.

Modern Christian views on abortion may be related to the safety of modern legal abortions. Due to the morbidity and mortality associated with unsafe illegal abortions prior to Roe v. Wade, a group of 21 Protestant ministers and Jewish rabbis in New York City formed the Clergy Consultation Service on Abortion (CCS), which later incorporated chapters in thirty-eight states with some 3,000 clergy members. The CCS counseled women with unwanted pregnancies and even provided referral to licensed physicians willing to perform the procedure for a national total of at least 450,000 people for safe abortions prior to 1973. In addition, after abortion was legal in New York state, in 1970, the Clergy Consultation Service started Women's Services, an abortion clinic in New York City. CCS members also publicly testified for their state legislators to repeal abortion laws. Florida Reverend Charles Landreth explains, "Whenever we try to make conditions for each other more human, we are engaged in a religious pursuit. Christians and the Christian church simply cannot turn their backs on the problem of abortion and the dilemmas which it creates."

== Prevalence of abortion among Christians ==
In 2011, the Guttmacher Institute reported that 70 percent of the women having abortions in the U.S. identified as Protestant or Catholic. The same report said that of all U.S. abortions, 37 percent were undertaken by women who identified as Protestant, and 28 percent were Catholic. The number of abortions performed on U.S. Catholic women is about the same per capita as the average in the general U.S. population; in the 2000s, Catholic women were 29 percent more likely to have an abortion than Protestant women. A 1996 study found that one out of five U.S. abortions was performed on a woman who was born-again or evangelical Christian. The same figure is reported in a 2008 survey, though in 2000, some 13 percent of abortion patients aged 18 and older identified as born-again or evangelical, but the item was reworded slightly with a broader definition for the 2008 survey. 15 percent of women having abortions reported attending religious services once a week or more, while 41 percent never attended religious services. The likelihood of a woman having an abortion is called the abortion index, with the value of 1.0 assigned to a probability equal to a population's average. Using this metric in America, U.S. Catholics were assessed by Guttmacher Institute in the 2000s, showing an index of 1.00–1.04. Similarly, Protestants were given an abortion index of 0.75–0.84, other religions 1.23–1.41, and non-religious women 1.38–1.59. An earlier study by the Roper Center for Public Opinion Research determined U.S. Protestants to have an abortion index of 0.69, Catholics 1.01, Jews 1.08, and non-Judeo-Christian religions 0.78. Women following no organized religion were indexed at 4.02.

According to the Alan Guttmacher Institute, Catholic countries tend to have high abortion rates. The estimated number of abortions per year in Brazil is roughly 1 million to 2 million. Peru, another Catholic country, each year sees abortions initiated by 5 percent of women in their childbearing years, whereas 3 percent of such women have abortions in the U.S.

In Nigeria, a 1999 study of 1,516 women having abortions determined that 69 percent were Protestant, 25 percent were Muslim, and the remainder were Catholic and other religions. The estimated number of abortions per year in Nigeria is roughly 2 million.

== History ==
=== Early Christian thought on abortion ===
Scholars generally agree that abortion was performed in the classical world, but there is disagreement about the frequency with which abortion was performed and which cultures influenced early Christian thought on abortion. Some writers point to the Hippocratic Oath (which specifically prohibits abortion) as evidence that condemnation of abortion was not a novelty introduced by the early Christians. Some writers state that there is evidence that some early Christians believed, as the Greeks did, in delayed ensoulment, or that a fetus does not have a soul until quickening, and therefore early abortion was not murder; Luker says there was disagreement on whether early abortion was wrong. Other writers say that early Christians considered abortion a sin even before ensoulment. According to some, the magnitude of the sin was, for the early Christians, on a level with general sexual immorality or other lapses; according to others, they saw it as "an evil no less severe and social than oppression of the poor and needy".

The society in which Christianity expanded was one in which abortion, infanticide and exposition were commonly used to limit the number of children (especially girls) that a family had to support. These methods were often used also when a pregnancy or birth resulted from sexual licentiousness, including marital infidelity, prostitution and incest, and Bakke holds that these contexts cannot be separated from abortion in early Christianity.

Between the first and fourth centuries AD, the Didache, Barnabas and the Apocalypse of Peter strongly condemned and outlawed abortion. The first-century Didache equates "the killing of an unborn child and the murder of a living child". To defend that Christians are not "cannibals", in his Plea for Christians (c. 177) to Emperor Marcus Aurelius, Church Father Athenagoras of Athens writes: "What reason would we have to commit murder when we say that women who induce abortions are murderers, and will have to give account of it to God?" Tertullian, another Church Father, provides an identical defense in his Apology to Emperor Septimius Severus (197): "In our case, murder being once for all forbidden, we may not destroy even the fetus in the womb, while as yet the human being derives blood from other parts of the body for its sustenance. To hinder a birth is merely a speedier man-killing."

Early synods did not term abortion "murder" or punish it as such, and imposed specified penalties only on abortions that were combined with some form of sexual crime and on the making of abortion drugs: the early 4th-century Synod of Elvira imposed denial of communion even at the point of death on those who committed the "double crime" of adultery and subsequent abortion, and the Synod of Ancyra imposed ten years of exclusion from communion on manufacturers of abortion drugs and on women aborting what they conceived by fornication (previously, such women and the makers of drugs for abortion were excluded until on the point of death).

Basil the Great (330–379) imposed the same ten-year exclusion on any woman who purposely destroyed her unborn child, even if unformed. Canon II of Basil's "Ninety-two Canons" states that one is:

a murderer who kills an imperfect and unformed embryo, because this though not yet then a complete human being was nevertheless destined to be perfected in the future, according to the indispensable sequence of the laws of nature.

Other early canons which treat abortion as equal to murder are for example: Canon XXI of "The Twenty-five Canons of the Holy regional Council held in Ancyra" (315), Canon XXI of "The Thirty-five Canons of John the Faster" and Canon XCI of "The One Hundred and Two Canons of the Holy and Ecumenical Sixth Council" (691).

While the Church has always condemned abortion, changing beliefs about the moment the embryo gains a human soul have led to changes in canon law in the classification of the sin of abortion. In particular, several historians have written that prior to the 19th century most Catholic authors did not regard as an abortion what we call "early abortion"—abortion before "quickening" or "ensoulment."

Quotations related to Abortion (pre-Reformation) at Wikiquote

=== Later Christian thought on abortion ===
From the 4th to 16th century AD, Christian philosophers, while maintaining the condemnation of abortion as wrong, had varying stances on whether abortion was murder. Under the first Christian Roman emperor Constantine, there was a relaxation of attitudes toward abortion and exposure of children. Bakke writes, "Since an increasing number of Christian parents were poor and found it difficult to look after their children, the theologians were forced to take into account this situation and reflect anew on the question. This made it possible to take a more tolerant attitude toward poor people who exposed their children."

Augustine of Hippo believed that an early abortion is not murder because, according to the Aristotelian concept of delayed ensoulment, the soul of a fetus at an early stage is not present, a belief that passed into canon law. Nonetheless, he harshly condemned the procedure: "Sometimes, indeed, this lustful cruelty, or if you please, cruel lust, resorts to such extravagant methods as to use poisonous drugs to secure barrenness; or else, if unsuccessful in this, to destroy the conceived seed by some means previous to birth, preferring that its offspring should rather perish than receive vitality; or if it was advancing to life within the womb, should be slain before it was born."(De Nube et Concupiscentia 1.17 (15)) St. Thomas Aquinas, Pope Innocent III, and Pope Gregory XIV also believed that a fetus does not have a soul until "quickening," or when the fetus begins to kick and move, and therefore early abortion was not murder, though later abortion was. Aquinas held that abortion was still wrong, even when not murder, regardless of when the soul entered the body. Pope Stephen V and Pope Sixtus V opposed abortion at any stage of pregnancy.

== See also ==
- Abortion debate
- Abortion-rights movements
- National Abortion Rights Action League
- Anti-abortion movements
- Religion and abortion
- Religious Coalition for Reproductive Choice
- United States abortion rights movement
- United States anti-abortion movement
