= Lutheran Women's Caucus =

The Lutheran Women's Caucus (LWC) was organized by women in the Lutheran Church–Missouri Synod in the 1960s and opened up to other synods in the 1970s, during the second wave of American feminism. The purpose of the LWC was to support the ordination of women in the Lutheran church. The Evangelical Lutheran Church in America (ELCA) soon began to ordain women in the 1970s, leaving the primary cause of feminists who were within both the Women's Caucus and ELCA without a primary focus for members, though caucus members of the Missouri Synod continued to be active. Since the mid-1980s, about 64% of American and Canadian Lutherans are members of the ELCA or ELCIC.

Today, the Lutheran Women's Caucus supports abortion rights, and is a member of the Religious Coalition for Reproductive Choice.
