= West Coast offensive =

The West Coast offensive is a coalition created by the governors of California, Oregon, and Washington to legally defend people from other states seeking an abortion, and to protect medical providers of reproductive care. It was announced in a tweet & video by governor Gavin Newsom on the morning of June 24, 2022.

The West Coast offensive vowed to expand abortion access and refuse to extradite individuals to other states who receive or aide in abortion services. The coalition also seeks to protect against judicial and local law enforcement cooperation with out-of-state investigations, inquiries and arrests regarding abortion providers, patients and other people who assist with obtaining an abortion or reproductive health services.

== See also ==
- Dobbs v. Jackson Women's Health Organization
- 2022 abortion rights protests in the United States
