= Religious Coalition for Reproductive Choice =

US non-profit organization

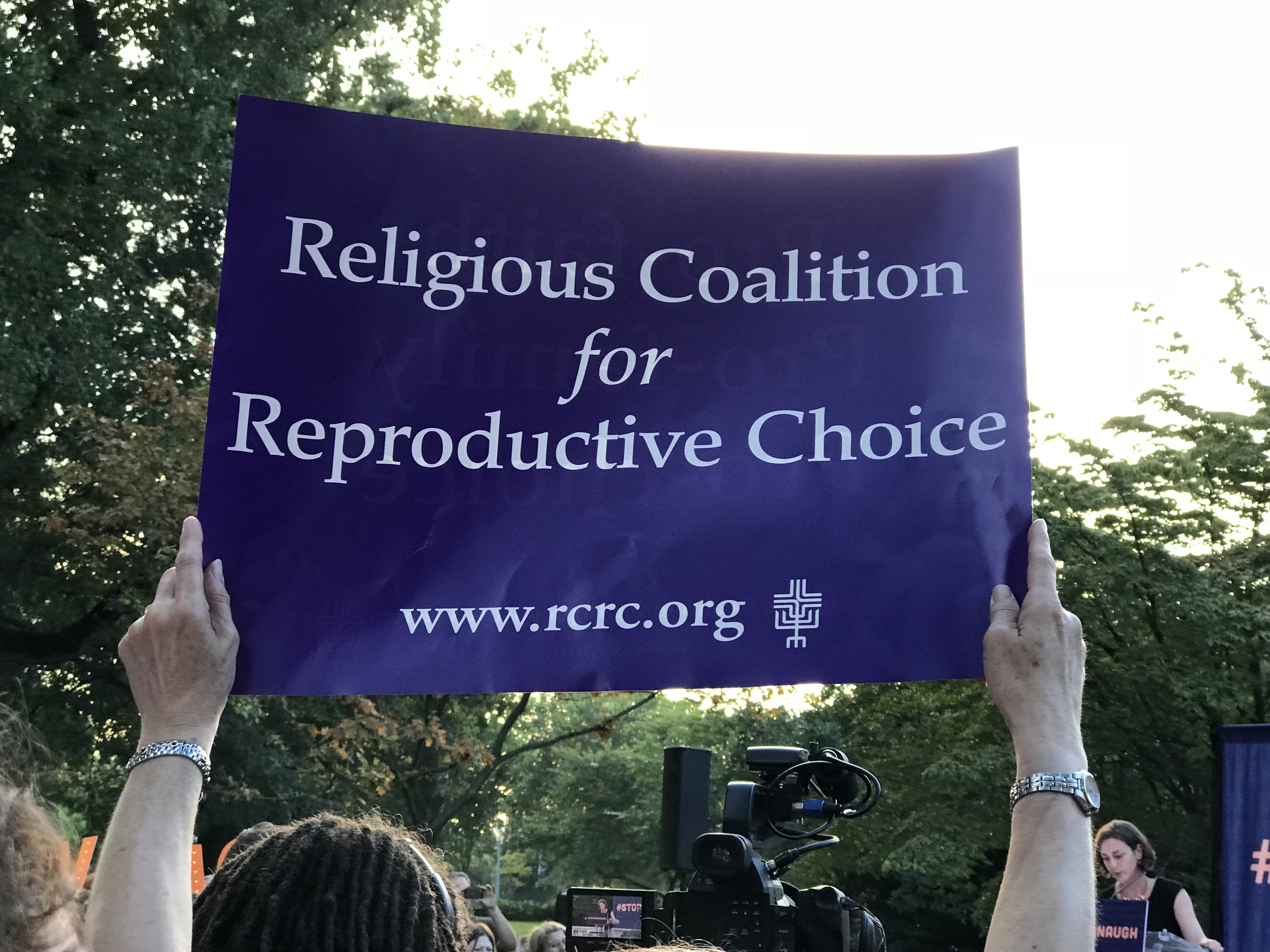
Stop Kavanaugh Rally on US Capitol Grounds, September 4, 2018

The Religious Coalition for Reproductive Choice (RCRC) is an American abortion rights organization founded in 1973 by clergy and lay leaders from mainline denominations and faith traditions to create an interfaith organization following Roe v. Wade, the 1973 U.S. Supreme Court decision legalizing abortion in the U.S. In 1993, the original name – the Religious Coalition for Abortion Rights (RCAR) – was changed to the Religious Coalition for Reproductive Choice.. In 2026, RCRC changed their name to the Religious Community for Reproductive Choice.

== Leadership ==
- President and CEO: Katey Zeh
- Chair of the Board: The Reverend Dr. Alethea Smith-Withers, pastor of the Pavilion of God (Baptist), Washington, DC
- Chair of the Coalition Council, Kate Lannamann, J.D.

== Activities ==
RCRC give spiritual guidance to women seeking abortions; doctors, doulas, and other health care professionals; other clergy; and reproductive rights activists. They advocate for laws that expand access to reproductive care.

In 2012, the Ohio RCRC successfully opposed two bills in the state legislature that would have defunded Planned Parenthood and instituted a heartbeat bill. The executive director of the Ohio RCRC at the time, Cathy Levy, said part of their success was due to RCRC "coordinat[ing] clergy to testify in opposition" to the bills.

RCRC members bless abortion clinics. In the late 2010s, RCRC members in Texas blessed several Whole Woman's Health clinics, a plaintiff in Supreme Court cases Whole Woman's Health v. Hellerstedt and Whole Woman's Health v. Jackson.

In 2021, Kentucky RCRC paid $12,000 for religious, pro-abortion digital billboards in Louisville, Nicholasville, and Paducah, Kentucky. They raised over $8,000 towards the advertisements through a fundraising campaign on GoFundMe. The wording of the advertisements drew critiques from religious anti-abortion groups.

In response to the 2021 Texas Heartbeat Act, the New Mexico RCRC financially assisted women who traveled from Texas to New Mexico to receive abortions.

=== National Black Church Initiative ===
In the late 1990s, Carlton W. Veazey became the president and CEO of RCRC. During first few years of his leadership, he created the National Black Church Initiative within RCRC. He and other members of the initiative founded the National Black Religious Summit on Sexuality. The first summit was held on June 12–13, 1997, at Howard University. Over 250 people attended and events included worship services, workshops, and keynote speeches. Calvin O. Butts, Henry Foster, Kelly Brown Douglas, and Walter Fauntroy spoke at the summit.

In 2000, RCRC and the NBCI launched a seminary project in order to educate Black clergy on issues of sexuality, reproductive choice, HIV prevention, and teenagers and sex.

== List of state affiliates ==
In 2023, the national RCRC dissolved their state affiliate network. Prior to that dissolution, the state affiliates and state networks of the Religious Coalition were involved in advocacy, education, community service, and implementing RCRC programs such as Clergy for Choice, All Options Clergy Counseling, and Spiritual Youth for Reproductive Freedom at the community and state level.

- California
- Colorado
- Connecticut
- Illinois
- Indiana
- Kentucky
- Minnesota
- New Mexico
- Ohio
- Oklahoma
- Wisconsin

== Member organizations ==
Coalition Council Members:

- Rabbinical Assembly
- United Synagogue of Conservative Judaism
- Union for Reform Judaism
- Women's League for Conservative Judaism
- Episcopal Church (United States)
- American Ethical Union National Service Conference
- Society for Humanistic Judaism
- Presbyterians Affirming Reproductive Options (PARO) of the Presbyterian Church (USA)
- Jewish Reconstructionist Federation
- Reconstructionist Rabbinical Association
- Central Conference of American Rabbis
- North American Federation of Temple Youth
- Women of Reform Judaism, The Federation of Temple Sisterhoods
- Women's Rabbinic Network of Central Conference of American Rabbis
- The United Church of Christ
- Unitarian Universalist Association
- Unitarian Universalist Women's Federation website
- Young Religious Unitarian Universalists
- Continental Unitarian Universalist Young Adult Network
- American Jewish Committee
- American Jewish Congress
- Anti-Defamation League
- Catholics for Choice
- Christian Lesbians Out (CLOUT)
- Church of the Brethren Women's Caucus
- Disciples for Choice
- Episcopal Urban Caucus
- Episcopal Women's Caucus
- Hadassah, WZOA
- Jewish Women International
- Lutheran Women's Caucus
- Methodist Federation for Social Action
- NA'AMAT USA
- National Council of Jewish Women
- Women's American ORT
- YWCA of the USA

== Reception ==
RCRC is criticized as advancing a "theology of choice" in Holy Abortion, a 2003 book co-authored by United Methodist Michael J. Gorman, a professor at St. Mary's Seminary & University in Baltimore, Maryland.

== See also ==
- Evangelical and Ecumenical Women's Caucus
- List of abortion-rights organizations in the United States
