= National Network of Abortion Funds =

American pro-abortion nonprofit organization

- Abbreviation: NNAF
- Formation: May 1–2, 1993
- Founded at: Chevy Chase, Maryland, U.S.
- Type: Nonprofit
- Tax ID no.: 04-3236982
- Purpose: Abortion access in the United States
- Headquarters: Beaverton, Oregon, U.S.
- Location: United States
- Region served: United States
- Official language: English; Spanish
- Co-Chair: Rosa Yadira Ortiz
- Co-Chair: Melissa Flores
- Interim Executive Director: Poonam Dreyfus-Pai
- Secretary: Uma Rao
- Revenue: $24,650,088 (2024)
- Expenses: $30,797,834 (2024)
- Staff: 315 (2022)
- Website: abortionfunds.org

The National Network of Abortion Funds (NNAF) is an American non-profit organization purposed to increase access to abortion for low-income people across the U.S.

== Founding and history ==
The NNAF was founded by 22 abortion funds from 14 states at a conference held May 1–2, 1993, at the National 4H Center in Chevy Chase, Maryland. The NNAF incorporated in 1994. A six-person national board was elected at the 1993 conference, and each board member was assigned several funds for which they had networking and communicating responsibilities.

The NNAF now consists of over 80 organizations in 38 states and 4 different countries. Funding is provided through donations from business and individuals, and is divided into each of these individual organizations.

In 2000, the NNAF joined with 200 organizations to begin a campaign fighting against the Hyde Amendment and punitive welfare reform. In 2016, the NNAF rallied alongside thousands of other organizations after the ruling that Texas cannot place restrictions on abortion services that cause an undue burden. In 2017, the NNAF grew to include individual people as members.

NNAF is a member of several national coalitions, including the Training and Access Working Group (TAWG), the Communications Group (communications directors from pro-choice organizations), and SisterSong Women of Color Reproductive Health Collective. The NNAF is currently partnered with two organizations: All* Above* All and Strong Families.

== Mission ==
The NNAF works to facilitate networking and to provide support and technical assistance to local abortion funds that provide direct financial and logistical assistance to women seeking abortions. In 2000, the Fund spearheaded the Campaign for Access to Reproductive Equity, which aimed to reverse the Hyde Amendment and make it possible for people to secure Medicaid funding for abortions.
