= I'm Not Sorry.net =

I'm Not Sorry.net was a website created by Patricia Beninato, that collected stories concerning women's positive abortion experiences. As of July 2010, the site contained over 900 stories.

== History ==
I'm Not Sorry.net was created by Patricia Beninato, a customer service representative from Richmond, Virginia, who stated that she got the idea in a chat room discussion on the 30th anniversary of Roe v. Wade. The hesitancy to openly talk about abortion in a positive context during the chat session suggested to Beninato that members of the pro-choice movement were tacitly agreeing with pro-lifers that abortion is a damaging experience.

After searching the Internet for post-abortion accounts, and finding only pro-life services which offered regret counseling, Beninato decided to set up a website on which women satisfied with their decision to abort could share their stories. A week after the online discussion that served as motivation, the site launched on January 29, 2003.

Beninato initially solicited stories on an Internet forum, but after a few months, as awareness of the site spread via word-of-mouth, she began receiving regular submissions.

Beninato blogged that she was originally from New Jersey and lived in Kentucky before moving to Virginia in 2000. She is married and has no children, by choice. Per the site she was briefly an abortion clinic escort in the 1980s.

== Site features ==
In addition to personal accounts, I'm Not Sorry.net features a FAQ section, which seeks to answer questions posed by pro-life visitors. In April 2005, Beninato created a companion blog for the site in which she addressed various pro-choice issues and explained the site.

Publicity comes primarily from word-of-mouth, blog mentions and clinic referrals, as Beninato does not accept advertising either on the site or the blog. Rumors held that a collection of stories might be published as a book, as Beninato, who had originally said that she felt the accounts were more powerful online, stated that a book was "an idea that's been broached to me a few times". Later, she stated that mainstream publishers showed no interest and she felt that such a book would be a "vanity project."

Beninato stated that the story of her own abortion was also included under a pseudonym, as she did not wish for people visiting the site to focus exclusively on her experience.

== Reaction ==
I'm Not Sorry.net received attention in the media, as Beninato made a television appearance on the CBC Television newsmagazine The National in February 2005 and gave interviews to publications including The Nation and Glamour.

Reactions to I'm Not Sorry.net are mixed. Laura Barcella, writing for Salon.com in 2004, noted I'm Not Sorry.net as one of several projects that allowed women to "frankly describe their abortions" and observed that the site "appears to be a reflection of the classic feminist credo 'abortion on demand, without apology'". Lynn Vincent, who interviewed Beninato for World magazine in 2005, questioned whether the site's policy of accepting anonymous submissions contradicted its stated goal of removing the secrecy often associated with abortion. Beninato replied that using only first names might help the pro-life side understand how personal the decision to abort is. Political writer Judith Warner stated in an editorial published on her New York Times-hosted blog, Domestic Disturbances, in 2006 that she did not think a site like I'm Not Sorry.net was "the best way to cement widespread support for a beleaguered movement", as she questioned whether it was reasonable to "[take] a strident, casual, even callous tone on [an] issue" that is often very emotionally charged. Beninato blogged that the site does not get as much traffic from anti-abortion supporters as it did in its early days because it has become known that she does not debate abortion "and that makes me uninteresting to them".

== See also ==
- Abortion debate
