= Abortion fund =

An abortion fund is a non-profit organization that provides financial and logistical assistance to individuals who cannot afford the costs of an abortion. Abortion funds play a role in financing abortion services in countries where abortion is legal but not accessible. For example, health insurance may not cover abortion or transportation to abortion clinics may be financially or logistically infeasible. Abortion funds also provide assistance in cities, states, provinces or countries where abortion is illegal and women travel elsewhere to obtain a legal abortion.

== Function ==
Abortion funds determine the amount of financial assistance based on individual need. Clients are interviewed individually and are expected to contribute as much as possible out-of-pocket, with the remainder provided by the fund as grant and/or repayable loan. Abortion funds rarely provide funding for the entire procedure. Some funds will combine resources with other funds to increase the grant or loan total. Most abortion funds serve a particular region or metropolitan area. Some abortion funds are related to a specific clinic, with funds available only for patients of that clinic. In addition to covering medical costs, some abortion funds provide child care, transportation assistance, meals, doula services, and other support services.

Most abortion funds are funded primarily by local donors and grant-making institutions. However, in 2019, the New York City Council allocated $250,000 to a local abortion fund for patients traveling from other states to New York for an abortion. Planned Parenthood clinics also have their own internal funding mechanism called the justice fund. Additionally, many independent abortion clinics in the U.S. offer discounts for students, military personnel, and patients who are Medicaid recipients.

Abortion funds operate in a number of countries. The National Network of Abortion Funds (NNAF) is an umbrella group for local abortion funds in the United States, and operates the Tiller Memorial Fund. The National Abortion Federation (NAF) operates a toll-free hotline for abortion funding and referrals in the United States and Canada. The NAF hotline also provides options counseling, case management for people with special needs, and may provide travel or additional funding assistance. The Women's Reproductive Rights Assistance Project (WRRAP) is another national abortion fund in the U.S., created by the L.A. National Council of Jewish Women in 1991, which funds approximately 1000 people's abortion procedures across the U.S. per year. The Abortion Support Network serves residents of Europe, mainly from Ireland, Poland, France and Malta, who need to travel for an abortion. The MARIA Abortion Fund for Social Justice provides financial, logistical and emotional support to access legal abortion services in Mexico City. Women Help Women is an online non-profit organization that provides medical abortion, contraception and emergency contraception to women globally, excluding the U.S., Canada, and parts of western Europe. The Women Help Women site also redirects callers to local abortion funds, resources, and hotlines.

== Legislation ==
State, federal or global legislation may also impact abortion accessibility as well as financial assistance for abortion. In the United States, federal funding for abortion through Medicaid, the public health insurance program for low-income residents, is banned except for cases of incest, rape, and life endangerment due to the Hyde Amendment. In addition, as of 2019, 33 states and the District of Columbia prohibit the use of state Medicaid funds for abortion, and 11 states restrict private health insurance for abortion.

Furthermore, U.S. legislation known as the Mexico City Policy, the Protecting Life in Global Health Assistance policy, or the global gag rule, prohibits U.S. foreign assistance to organizations unless they promise not to perform or actively promote abortion as a form of family planning. This applies to public health organizations which may provide funding assistance for or information about abortion. The Safe Abortion Action Fund (SAAF) was established in 2006 by International Planned Parenthood Federation (IPPF) to fund local organizations that have been impacted by the Global Gag Rule, including those that fund abortion.

== Abortion costs in the United States ==
Cost is a common barrier to obtaining an abortion in the United States. The cost of an abortion varies by facility, type of abortion, and gestation of the pregnancy. As of 2014, the median cost of a procedural or medication abortion in the first trimester is estimated to be about $500, and about twice as much in the second trimester. This does not include non-medical costs, such as transportation, lodging, childcare and lost wages.

The majority of U.S. abortion patients are poor or low-income, and most do not carry insurance coverage that pays for abortion. Private health insurance does not always cover abortion, and public health insurance covers abortions only within certain circumstances. As a result, the majority of abortion patients incur high out-of-pocket costs when receiving abortion services. The out-of-pocket costs of abortion contribute to delays in seeking care, which can further increase costs for the procedure and for travel to clinics that offer abortion at later gestation.

== Legality ==
Lawmakers in anti-abortion states have been targeting and threatening abortion funds and their donors with criminal prosecution under their state's abortion statutes. On March 18, 2022, State Representative Briscoe Cain sent cease-and-desist letters to every abortion fund in Texas, declaring them "criminal organizations" and demanding that they immediately halt payments for elective abortions performed in Texas. Cain warned abortion funds that they were violating Texas's unrepealed pre-Roe abortion statutes by aiding or abetting elective abortions, and exposing each of their employees, volunteers, and donors to felony criminal prosecution. Cain said that Roe v. Wade did not create or recognize a constitutional right to pay for another person's abortion, and that Roe protects only abortion providers and their patients from prosecution under the state's pre-Roe criminal abortion statutes. In response, abortion funds demanded that Cain retract his claims and threatened to sue him for defamation.

== See also ==
- Abortion
- Abortion in Mexico
- Abortion in the United Kingdom
- Abortion in the United States
- Hyde Amendment
