= Hyde Amendment =

US law banning federal funds paying for abortions except in certain cases

In U.S. politics, the Hyde Amendment is a legislative provision barring the use of federal funds to pay for abortion, except to save the life of the mother, or if the pregnancy arises from incest or rape. Following the initial ruling of Roe v. Wade, which legalized abortion in the United States in 1973, an estimated 300,000 abortions were performed annually using federal funds, before the Hyde Amendment took effect in 1980.

The original Hyde Amendment was passed on September 30, 1976, by the House of Representatives, with a 312–93 vote to override the veto of a funding bill for the Department of Health, Education, and Welfare (HEW). It was named for its chief sponsor, Republican Congressman Henry Hyde of Illinois. The measure represented one of the first major legislative gains by the United States anti-abortion movement following the Supreme Court decision in Roe v. Wade.

The Hyde Amendment has remained a topic of significant debate, and it has been amended many times since its initial implementation. Initially in 1977, the amendment contained no exceptions, but has since been amended to include an exception for pregnancies that endanger the life of the mother. The amendment received major backlash as it left little room for unique situations. In 1978, it was amended to include exceptions for life endangerment of the mother as well as cases of rape or incest. After more amendments, the version in force from 1981 until 1993 prohibited the use of federal funds for abortions, "except where the life of the mother would be endangered if the fetus were carried to term". However, there was much debate during this time on whether more exceptions, like cases of rape or incest or severe health consequences for the mother, should be included. In 1993, the amendment was expanded to include exceptions for rape and incest in addition to the life endangerment of the mother. Since then, the language included in the amendment has generally stayed the same and has included these three exceptions.

Supporters of the amendment generally believe that American taxpayers should not be forced to contribute to abortion services, and many base this belief in opinions about the morality of abortion. Others oppose the amendment due to its disproportionate effects on women in poverty who rely on federally funded abortions, as well as women of color who are statistically more likely to rely on Medicaid. Following the overturn of Roe v. Wade, Hyde's disproportionate effects have only been amplified as many women no longer have access to abortion in their states, only increasing the cost of care.

== Background ==
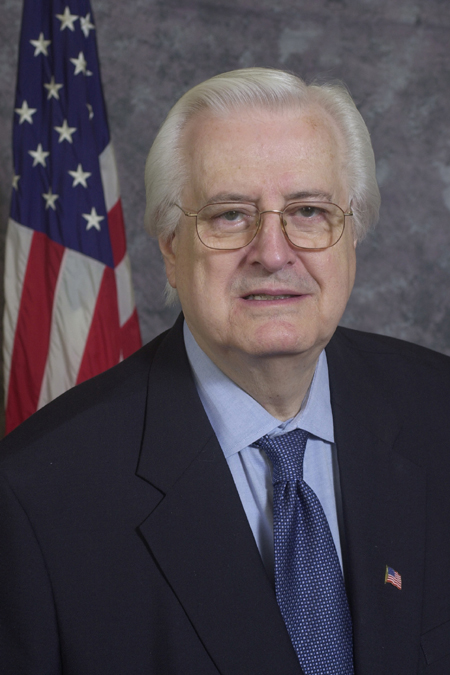
Congressman Henry Hyde

Prior to 1973, abortion was largely criminalized in the United States, and thus, not federally funded. Following the ruling of Roe v. Wade in 1973, abortion was a service provided using federal funds through programs like Medicare. While many heralded this as an advancement for abortion access across the country, some also opposed the use of federal funding to pay for abortions.

In alignment with this opposition, the Hyde Amendment was written by Massachusetts Republican Congressman Silvio Conte and introduced by Illinois Republican Congressman Henry Hyde. Hyde himself believed that abortion was immoral and that Americans shouldn't be contributing their tax dollars to fund abortion under any circumstance. Following Roe, however, the only option to limit access to abortion was through restriction of federal funding used for abortions.

The Hyde Amendment is part of a larger appropriations bill for the departments of Labor and Health and Human Services that is annually amended. The amendment has been re-enacted every year since 1976, but exceptions have varied.

Other bans were modeled after the Hyde Amendment, extending to other annual spending bills in the late 1970s and early 1980s. This eventually led federal funds to be banned in federal worker health plans, women in federal prisons, women in the military, peace corps volunteers, and international family planning programs that use non-U.S. funds to perform or advocate for abortion.However, some U.S. states provide their own public funding for abortion for Medicaid-eligible women.

== Arguments and effects ==
Proponents of Hyde state that it is supported by 57% of the American public and opposed by 36%, as of 2016. However, many people are critical of the Hyde Amendment's disproportionate effects on low-income women, women of color, younger women, and immigrants. An estimated 42% of abortion recipients live below the poverty line. Additionally, Black and Latina women of reproductive age are nearly twice as likely than White and Asian women to rely on Medicaid, with 32% and 28% enrolled, respectively. Only 17% of White women and 14% of Asian women are enrolled in Medicaid. Since the passage of the Hyde Amendment, more than one million women were not able to afford abortions. 18 to 33 percent of Medicaid-eligible women who desire abortions have also given birth because they live in states that do not provide funding.

The Hyde Amendment restricts abortion coverage for federally funded health care recipients, specifically women enrolled in Medicare and Medicaid, Native American women, U.S. servicewomen and veterans, women in Peace Corps, federal employee families, D. C. women residents, and women in immigration detention facilities and prisons. The Hyde Amendment does not preclude women who receive health care through the U.S. government the option of paying for the procedure out of pocket. According to a 2014 national survey of abortion patients, women in states without Medicaid coverage of abortion were three times as likely to pay for their abortions out of pocket, and five times as likely to rely on financial assistance from an abortion fund, compared to women in states with Medicaid coverage.

== State actions ==
States that fund abortions Medicaid covers medically necessary abortion for low-income women through legislation. Medicaid covers medically necessary abortions for low-income women under court order. Medicaid denies abortion coverage for low-income women except for cases of rape, incest, life or health endangerment, or severe fetal abnormality. Medicaid denies abortion coverage for low-income women except for cases of rape, incest, life endangerment, or severe fetal abnormality. Medicaid denies abortion coverage for low-income women except for cases of rape, incest, or life or health endangerment. Medicaid denies abortion coverage for low-income women except for cases of rape, incest, or life endangerment. Medicaid denies abortion coverage for low-income women except for cases of life endangerment.

The cutoff of federal Medicaid funds prompted some states to provide public funding for abortion services from their own coffers. Over time the number of states doing so has gradually expanded, either through legislation or consequent to judicial rulings.

As of 2026, 21 states fund abortions with fewer restrictions than Hyde or zero restrictions. 29 states only fund abortions under the provisions established by Hyde. After the overturn of Roe v. Wade, 13 states have total abortion bans in place, meaning that abortions cannot be preformed and thus, are not covered by any insurance.

Specific stipulations have been put in place by some state governments. Some of these provisions remove restrictions that have been put in place at the federal level while others are used to further extend the reach that Hyde Amendment has put into place. For example, in Iowa, in order to receive an abortion under the Medicaid program, approval must be given from the governor. In Iowa, Mississippi, and Virginia, a provision has been made for the case of fetal impairment.

Additionally, states that do not have total bans on abortion or Hyde-like provisions on abortion funding may still have other regulations in place. Many states limit when abortions can be preformed, creating restrictions on abortions anywhere from 26 to 6 weeks after fertilization. States also limit the types of medications, appointments, and out-of-state options. These barriers only amplify the disproportionate effects of the Hyde Amendment- individuals who live in states with abortion restrictions or funding restrictions may have to travel out of state or pay more for care, increasing their financial burden.

== Timeline ==
=== 1976–1977 ===
The amendment was first passed by Congress in September 1976, three years after Roe v. Wade, as part of the appropriations bill for fiscal year 1977. Its implementation was blocked for almost a year by an injunction in the McRae v. Mathews case. During this case, the Reproductive Freedom Project, the Center for Constitutional Rights, and Planned Parenthood collectively represented a pregnant Medicaid recipient and health care providers who challenged the Hyde Amendment. The United States Supreme Court vacated the injunction in June 1977, and the district court lifted its remaining order that August, after which abortions financed by federal Medicaid dropped from about 300,000 per year to a few thousand.

=== 1978 ===
The version enacted for fiscal year 1978 added exceptions for rape or incest that had been promptly reported to a law enforcement agency or public health service, and for cases in which two physicians determined that the pregnancy would cause "severe and long-lasting physical health damage", in addition to the exception for life-threatening pregnancies.

=== 1980 ===
In January 1980, a federal district court ruled the Hyde Amendment unconstitutional. On June 30, 1980, the Supreme Court reversed that ruling and upheld the amendment with a 5–4 vote in Harris v. McRae. The majority found that the Hyde Amendment did not violate the Establishment Clause of the First Amendment or the due process and equal protection guarantees of the Fifth Amendment, reasoning that the right recognized in Roe did not entitle a woman to public funds to exercise it. The Court also held that states participating in Medicaid were not required to pay for abortions for which federal reimbursement was unavailable. Congress then narrowed the exceptions: for fiscal years 1981 through 1993, federal funding was available only where the woman's life was endangered. In Williams v. Zbaraz (1980), the United States Supreme Court also held that states could enact their own versions of the Hyde Amendment.

=== 1989-1992 ===
In Webster v. Reproductive Health Services of Missouri (1989), the court held that states could also enact measures like the Hyde Amendment.

In 1989, Congress passed a Labor and Health and Human Services appropriations bill for fiscal year 1990 that restored the exceptions for rape and incest. President George H. W. Bush vetoed the bill, and an attempt in the House to override the veto failed.

=== 1993-1994 ===
On October 22, 1993, President Bill Clinton signed into law the Departments of Labor, Health and Human Services, and Education, and Related Agencies Appropriations Act, 1994. The Act contained a new version of the Hyde Amendment that expanded the category of abortions for which federal funds are available under Medicaid to include cases of rape and incest. As of 1994, federal law mandates all states to pay for abortion cases involving rape or incest.

=== 2010 ===
The Stupak–Pitts Amendment (2010), an amendment to the Affordable Health Care for America Act, was introduced by Democratic Rep. Bart Stupak of Michigan. It prohibits the use of Federal funds "to pay for any abortion or to cover any part of the costs of any health plan that includes coverage of abortion", except in cases of rape, incest, or danger to the life of the mother, and was included in the bill as passed by the House of Representatives on November 7, 2009. However, the Senate bill passed by the House on March 21, 2010, did not contain that Hyde Amendment language. As part of an agreement between Rep. Stupak and President Obama to secure Stupak's vote, the President issued Executive Order 13535 on March 24, 2010, affirming that the Hyde Amendment would extend to the new bill.

=== 2016 ===
The 2016 Democratic platform marked the first major political party platform to include an explicit call to repeal the Hyde Amendment.

Hillary Clinton advocated for a repeal of the Hyde Amendment throughout her 2016 Presidential campaign. She was quoted as saying, "Any right that requires you to take extraordinary measures to access it is no right at all", at a campaign rally in New Hampshire. The Democratic vice presidential candidate Tim Kaine reportedly stood with his running mate on the issue, despite formerly having been a supporter of the Hyde Amendment.

=== 2017 ===
On January 24, 2017, the House voted to make the Hyde Amendment (H.R. 7) permanent. Speaker Paul Ryan (R-WI) stated that "we are a pro-life Congress" and re-affirmed the government's commitment to restricting tax money to funding abortions. The bill failed to become law.

=== 2018 ===
In 2018, Republicans proposed adding the Hyde Amendment to the Affordable Care Act in the 2018 spending bill, in exchange for increased funding to reduce insurance premiums and adding re-insurance. However, this was rejected by Democrats. Former Speaker Paul Ryan had said that he would not bring measures to the floor on reducing ACA premiums without adding the Hyde Amendment language.

=== 2019-2025 ===
During the 2020 presidential campaign, Joe Biden reversed his previous support of the Hyde Amendment and pledged to work to overturn it if elected. In 2021, he introduced a 2022 budget that completely omitted the Hyde Amendment. A Labor, Health and Human Services bill unveiled in 2021 excluded the amendment.

However, the amendment was reinserted into the federal budget that was passed in March 2022, with 206 Democrats voting for the spending bill and 15 voting against it. As reported in Roll Call, “Democrats voted overwhelmingly for the nondefense portion of the omnibus.” House Appropriations Chair Rosa DeLauro, D-Conn., "expressed frustration over her party's concession on Hyde [retaining it in the final passed omnibus bill]. She said she's the ‘first appropriations chair since 1977 to remove it because I understand that this is an offensive and discriminatory policy which has shut out countless women from the reproductive health care that they deserve for more than 40 years.’”

=== 2025-present ===
On January 24, 2025, President Donald Trump revoked two executive orders made by Joe Biden in 2022 that directed the Department of Health and Human Services to identify actions in protecting and expand access to abortion care, stating that "the Congress has annually enacted the Hyde Amendment and similar laws that prevent Federal funding of elective abortion, reflecting a longstanding consensus that American taxpayers should not be forced to pay for that practice."

=== Crenshaw Amendment (2025) ===
The Crenshaw Amendment was a legislative provision introduced by Republican Rep. Dan Crenshaw of Texas which took the same approach as the Hyde Amendment, but with gender transition procedures. Dubbed "the new Hyde Amendment" by Crenshaw, it would have prohibited the use of Federal funds in Medicaid, the Children's Health Insurance Program (CHIP) and the Affordable Care Act from paying "for specified gender transition procedures" for both children and adults alike. The provision would have defined these procedures to mean "those that are intended to change the body of an individual to no longer correspond to the individual's biological sex (male or female), including specified surgeries, implants, and medications (e.g., hormones)," and exclude "procedures that are provided to an individual under the age of 18 with the consent of a parent or legal guardian and that are intended to (1) rectify early puberty, genetic disorders, or chromosomal abnormalities; (2) reverse prior gender transition procedures; or (3) prevent imminent death or impairment of a major bodily function." This legislation was included in the One Big Beautiful Bill Act as passed by the House of Representatives on May 22, 2025. On June 26, 2025, the Senate Parliamentarian ruled that the amendment violated the Byrd Rule, meaning that it would need to get 60 votes in the Senate in order to remain in the bill. Instead of bringing it up for a vote, Senate Republicans chose to remove the Crenshaw Amendment from the final bill entirely, shortly before voting to pass the final bill. If it had passed, the amendment would have taken effect in 2027. In the aftermath of the One Big Beautiful Bill Act, the Trump Administration took administrative action to prevent Medicaid from paying "for specified sex trait modification" for children in Medicaid starting in 2026.

Many people argue that issues surrounding access to gender-affirming care are closely related to abortion access. Some states with restrictive abortion access also have restrictive policies around gender-affirming care. As seen with the Crenshaw amendment, states follow a similar method when limiting access to gender-affirming care and abortions- these policies target when and by whom treatment can be accessed, funding under Medicaid and private insurance, and they disproportionately affect low-income individuals.

== See also ==
- Abortion in the United States
- Helms Amendment to the Foreign Assistance Act, an amendment from 1973 that restricts US federal funding for abortion overseas
- Rosie Jimenez, the first woman known to have died due to an unsafe abortion after the Hyde Amendment was passed
- Types of abortion restrictions in the United States
- Mexico City policy
