= Edward C. Lawson =

African American civil rights activist

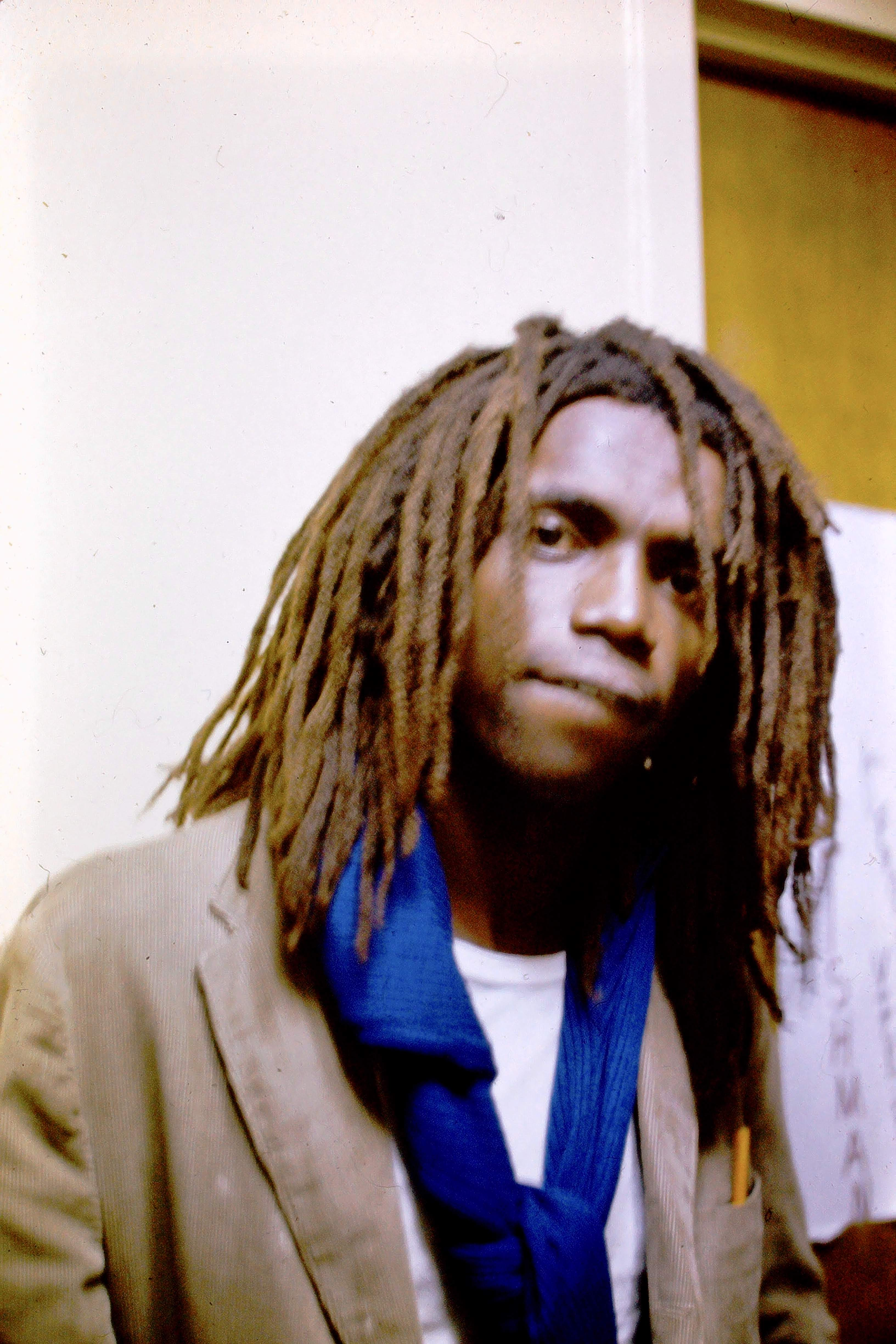

Edward C. Lawson (born 1946 or 1947) was an African American civil rights activist, who was the respondent in the case of Kolender v. Lawson, 461 U.S. 352 (1983), in which the United States Supreme Court ruled that a California statute authorizing a police officer to arrest a person for refusing to present identification was unconstitutionally vague.

== Personal life ==
Aside from his landmark supreme court case, very few biographical details are known about Lawson, a man described by the Los Angeles Times as "mysterious, even secretive". Said to the owner of a San Francisco-based business in 1982, he was reportedly a vegetarian, and claimed that he was entirely sober, refusing all drugs and alcohol. In 1993, he avoided discussing "exactly how he makes a living", only indicating that by then, he ran a business in Los Angeles and was a member of the Screen Actors Guild.

== Civil rights case ==
Lawson is a protagonist in Kolender v. Lawson, 461 U.S. 352 (1983), a significant civil rights case. Between 1975 and 1977, while living in San Diego, Lawson was arrested fifteen times for violating a California law which made illegal "wander[ing] upon the streets" and failing to provide identity when prompted by a peace officer. He believed that his arrests were racial discrimination, noting that he was an African-American man who went for walks in his mostly white neighborhood. He challenged the constitutionality of the law in court, and in 1983 the Supreme Court ruled that the statute was unconstitutionally vague in the latitude it provided police to determine what constituted a violation.

This case is of historical importance not only because the California statute was voided, but also because it is one of the few examples of an ordinary citizen successfully representing himself all the way through a U.S. District Court. By the time the case arrived at the Supreme Court, he was represented by attorney Robert H. Lynn, through the American Civil Liberties Union. Lawson received political support at the time from prominent Black leaders including Jesse Jackson, activist/comedian Dick Gregory, U.S. Congresswoman Maxine Waters, and U.S. Congressman John Conyers.

In 1983, Carl Stern, the CBS Evening News U.S. Supreme Court reporter commented that this case was the most reported U.S. Supreme Court case that year. Stern was referring to front-page newspaper articles in The New York Times, The Washington Post, Chicago Tribune, The Miami Herald, Los Angeles Times as well as articles in Newsweek, Time, Fortune, The Village Voice and other news publications. Additionally, Lawson made repeated appearances on The Oprah Winfrey Show, The Phil Donahue Show, Larry King Live, Crossfire, The Ricki Lake Show, The Today Show, and Good Morning America.

Harvard University law professor Laurence Tribe commented during an appearance on The Oprah Winfrey Show that this case was the last time that the U.S. Supreme Court had decided in favor of a defendant in a civil rights case of this magnitude.

California Penal Code § 647(e) was repealed by the California Legislature in 2008.

== See also ==
- Hiibel v. Sixth Judicial District Court of Nevada
- Kolender v. Lawson
- Police misconduct
- Racial profiling
- Stop and identify statutes
- Contempt of cop
- Driving while black
- Henry Louis Gates arrest controversy
