= Bellotti v. Baird =

Bellotti v. Baird can refer to

- Bellotti v. Baird (1976), 428 U.S. 132, upholding a Massachusetts law requiring parental or judge's consent to a minor's abortion
- Bellotti v. Baird (1979), 443 U.S. 622, ruling that teenagers do not have to secure parental consent to obtain an abortion
