= Bellotti =

Bellotti is an Italian surname. Notable people with the surname include:

- Biagio Bellotti (1714–1789), Italian painter, architect, sculptor, musician and canon
- David Bellotti (1943–2015), British politician
- Derek Bellotti (born 1946), English footballer
- Francesco Bellotti (born 1979), Italian cyclist
- Francis Bellotti (1923–2024), American lawyer, politician in Massachusetts
- Laurie Bellotti (born 1976), former Australian rules footballer
- Luigi Bellotti (1914–1995), Vatican diplomat
- Michael G. Bellotti (born 1963), American politician in Massachusetts
- Mike Bellotti (born 1950), American football analyst
- Piero Bellotti (1942–2022), Italian wrestler
- Pietro Bellotti (1625–1700), Italian painter
- Reece Bellotti (born 1990), British boxer
- Riccardo Bellotti (born 1991), Italian tennis player
- Victoria Bellotti, User Experience Manager for Growth at Lyft, Inc.

== See also ==
- Belotti
- Bellotti v. Baird (1976)
- Bellotti v. Baird (1979)
- First National Bank of Boston v. Bellotti
- Bellotti's goby, species of goby native to the Mediterranean Sea
- Italian Bellotti Cymbals, small Italian cymbal workshop, active from the 50s until the 70s
