= Stop and identify statutes =

US state laws allowing police to require identification of those suspected of a crime

States with stop and identify statutes Missouri, which has a stop and identify statute that only applies to Kansas City Information as of April 25, 2026.

"Stop and identify" statutes are laws currently in use in the US states of Alabama, Arkansas, Arizona, Colorado, Delaware, Florida, Georgia, Illinois, Indiana, Kansas, Louisiana, Missouri (Kansas City only), Montana, Nebraska, Nevada, New Hampshire, New Mexico, New York, North Dakota, Ohio, Rhode Island, Utah, Vermont, and Wisconsin, authorizing police to lawfully order people whom they reasonably suspect of committing a crime to state their name.

If there is no reasonable suspicion that a person has committed a crime, is committing a crime, or is about to commit a crime, the person is not required to identify himself or herself, even in these states. Different obligations apply to drivers of motor vehicles, who generally are required by state vehicle codes to present a driver's license to police upon request.

The Fourth Amendment prohibits unreasonable searches and seizures and requires warrants to be supported by probable cause. In Terry v. Ohio (1968), the U.S. Supreme Court established that it is constitutional for police to temporarily detain a person based on "specific and articulable facts" that establish reasonable suspicion that a crime has been or will be committed. An officer may conduct a patdown for weapons based on a reasonable suspicion that the person is armed and poses a threat to the officer or others. In Hiibel v. Sixth Judicial District Court of Nevada (2004), the Supreme Court held that statutes requiring suspects to disclose their names during a valid Terry stop did not violate the Fourth Amendment.

Some "stop and identify" statutes that are unclear about how people must identify themselves violate suspects' due process rights through the void for vagueness doctrine. For instance, in Kolender v. Lawson (1983), the U.S. Supreme Court invalidated a California law requiring "credible and reliable" identification as overly vague. The court also held that the Fifth Amendment could allow a suspect to refuse to give his or her name if he or she articulated a reasonable belief that giving the name could be incriminating.

The Nevada "stop-and-identify" law at issue in Hiibel allows police officers to detain any person encountered under circumstances which reasonably indicate that "the person has committed, is committing, or is about to commit a crime"; the person may be detained only to "ascertain his identity and the suspicious circumstances surrounding his presence abroad." In turn, the law requires that the officer have a reasonable and articulable suspicion of criminal involvement, and that the person detained "identify himself," but the law does not compel the person to answer any other questions by the officer. The Nevada Supreme Court interpreted "identify" under the state's law to mean merely stating one's name.

As of April 2008, 23 other states had similar laws. Additional states (including Arizona, Texas, South Dakota and Oregon) have such laws just for motorists, which penalize the failure to present a driver license during a traffic stop.

== Encounters between law enforcement and the public ==
In the United States, interactions between police and others fall into three general categories: consensual ("contact" or "conversation"), detention (often called a Terry stop, after Terry v. Ohio, 392 U.S. 1 (1968)), or arrest. "Stop and identify" laws pertain to detentions.

=== Consensual ===
At any time, police may approach a person and ask questions. Police may suspect involvement in a crime, but may lack knowledge of any "specific and articulable facts" that would justify a detention or arrest, and hope to obtain these facts from the questioning. The person approached is not required to identify themselves or answer any other questions, and may leave at any time.

Police are not required to tell a person that he or she is free to decline to answer questions and go about his or her business; however, a person can usually determine whether the interaction is consensual by asking, "Am I free to go?".

=== Reasonable suspicion ===
A person is detained when circumstances are such that a reasonable person would believe the person is not free to leave.

Police may briefly detain a person if the police have a reasonable suspicion that the person has committed, is committing, or is about to commit a crime. Many state laws explicitly grant this authority. In Terry v. Ohio, the U.S. Supreme Court established that police may conduct a limited search for weapons (known as a "frisk") if the police reasonably suspect that the person to be detained may be armed and dangerous.

While the police officer must have reasonable suspicion to detain a person, the officer has no obligation to inform the person what that suspicion was. The only time the officer would have to articulate the suspicion is when the person was arrested, and the person later challenged the validity of the stop in court.

Police may question a person detained in a Terry stop, but, in general, the detainee is not required to answer. However, many states have "stop and identify" laws that explicitly require a person detained under the conditions of Terry to identify themselves to police, and in some cases, to provide additional information.

Before Hiibel, whether a detainee could be arrested and prosecuted for refusing to disclose their name was an unresolved issue. Authority on this issue was split among the United States courts of appeals, and the U.S. Supreme Court twice expressly refused to address the question. In Hiibel, the Court opinion implied that a detainee was not required to produce written identification, but could satisfy the requirement merely by stating the detainee's name. Some "stop and identify" laws do not require that a detainee identify himself or herself, but allow the refusal to do so to be considered along with other factors in determining whether there is probable cause to arrest.

As of February 2011, the Supreme Court has not addressed the validity of requirements that a detainee provide information other than their name. Some states, such as Arizona, however, have specifically codified that a detained person is not required to provide any information aside from a full name.

=== Arrest ===
A detention requires only that police have reasonable suspicion that a person is involved in criminal activity. However, to make an arrest, an officer must have probable cause to believe that the person has committed a crime. Some states require police to inform the person of the intent to make the arrest and the cause for the arrest. However, it is not always obvious when a detention becomes an arrest. After making an arrest, police may search a person, their belongings, and their immediate surroundings.

Whether an arrested person must identify himself or herself may depend on the jurisdiction in which the arrest occurs. On June 23, 2022, the Supreme Court of the United States voted six to three in the decision Vega v. Tekoh that police may not be sued for failing to administer a Miranda warning. However, Miranda does not apply to biographical data necessary to complete booking. It is not clear whether a "stop and identify" law could compel giving one's name after being arrested, although some states have laws that specifically require an arrested person to give their name and other biographical information, and some state courts have held that refusal to give one's name constitutes obstructing a public officer. As a practical matter, an arrested person who refused to give their name would have little chance of obtaining a prompt release.

== Obligation to identify ==
States with "stop and identify" laws
Alabama	Ala. Code §15-5-30
Arizona	Ari. Rev. Stat. Tit. 13, §2412 (enacted 2005) & Tit. 28, §1595
Arkansas	Ark. Code Ann. § 5-71-213 - Loitering
Colorado	Colo. Rev. Stat. §16-3-103(1)
Delaware	Del. Code Ann., Tit. 11, §§1902 (requires suspicion of a crime), 1321(6)(in the context of loitering)
Florida	Fla. Stat. §901.151 (Stop and Frisk Law); §856.021(2) (loitering and prowling). Note: Florida’s stop and frisk law does not have a component requiring the suspect to identify themselves. It just confirms the right to detain and conduct a Terry pat down. Thus, Florida is only stop and identify with respect to its loitering statute.
Georgia	Ga. Code Ann. §16-11-36(b) (loitering)
Illinois	Ill. Comp. Stat., ch. 725, §5/107-14
Indiana	Indiana Code IC §34-28-5-3.5
Kansas	Kan. Stat. Ann.
Louisiana	La. Code Crim. Proc. Ann., Art. 215.1(A); La. Rev. Stat. 14:108(B)(1)(c)
Missouri (Kansas City Only)	Mo. Rev. Stat. §84.710(2)
Montana	Mont. Code Ann. §46-5-401
Nebraska	Neb. Rev. Stat. §29-829
Nevada	Nev. Rev. Stat. §171.123
New Hampshire	N.H. Rev. Stat. Ann. §594:2, §644:6
New Mexico	N.M. Stat. Ann. §30-22-3
New York	N.Y. Crim. Proc. Law Laws of New York → CPL §140.50 (requires suspicion of crime)
North Carolina	State v Friend + N.C. Gen.Stat. § 14–223 (applies only to traffic stops)
North Dakota	N.D. Cent. Code §29-29-21 (PDF)
Ohio	Ohio Rev. Code §2921.29 (enacted 2006)
Rhode Island	R.I. Gen. Laws §12-7-1
Utah	Utah Code Ann. §77-7-15
Vermont	Vt. Stat. Ann., Tit. 24, §1983
Wisconsin	Wis. Stat. §968.24

States not listed do not have a requirement to show Identification to law enforcement officers. Some states listed have "stop and ID" laws which may or may not require someone to identify himself or herself during an investigative detention.

While Wisconsin statutes allow law enforcement officers to "demand" ID, there is no statutory requirement to provide them ID nor is there a penalty for refusing to; hence Wisconsin is not a must ID state. Annotations for Wisconsin §968.24, however, state "The principles of Terry permit a state to require a suspect to disclose his or her name in the course of a Terry stop and allow imposing criminal penalties for failing to do so", citing Hiibel as authority. Hiibel held that statutes requiring suspects to disclose their names during police investigations did not violate the Fourth Amendment if the statute first required reasonable and articulable suspicion of criminal involvement. The Wisconsin Supreme Court held in Henes v. Morrissey that "A crime is made up of two parts: proscribed conduct and a prescribed penalty. The former without the latter is no crime. ..." In this case no statute penalizes a refusal to identify oneself to a law enforcement officer, and no penalty is set forth in the statute for refusing to identify oneself. This statute is part of Chapter 968 entitled "Commencement of Criminal Proceedings.” By its very terms sec. 968.24 empowers a law enforcement officer to stop and question 'in the vicinity where the person was stopped'. The statute does not authorize a law enforcement officer to make an arrest." (These quotes come from the dissenting opinion but is in line with the majority opinion.) Additionally Henes v. Morrissey held that a detained person not providing their name isn't on its own a violation of 946.41 Resisting or obstructing officer as the act of not identifying oneself is not a false statement with intent to mislead the officer in the performance of their duty.

Neither is Illinois, since the Illinois Second District Appellate Court Decision in People v. Fernandez, 2011 IL App (2d) 100473, which specifically states that section 107-14 is found in the Code of Criminal Procedure of 1963, not the Criminal Code of 1961, and governs only the conduct of police officers. There is no corresponding duty in the Criminal Code of 1961 that a suspect who is the target of such an order must comply.

As of February 2011, there is no U.S. federal law requiring that an individual identify himself or herself during a Terry stop, but Hiibel held that states may enact such laws, provided the law requires the officer to have reasonable and articulable suspicion of criminal involvement, and 24 states have done so. The opinion in Hiibel implied that persons detained by police in jurisdictions with constitutional "stop and identify" laws listed are obligated to identify themselves, and that persons detained in other jurisdictions are not. The issue may not be that simple, however, for several reasons:

- The wording of "stop and identify" laws vary considerably from state to state.
- Noncompliance with a "stop and identify" law that does not explicitly impose a penalty may constitute violation of another law, such as one to the effect of "resisting, obstructing, or delaying a peace officer".
- State courts have made varying interpretations of both "stop and identify" and "obstructing" laws.

=== Variations in "stop and identify" laws ===
- Four states' laws (Arizona, Indiana, Louisiana, and Nevada) explicitly impose an obligation to provide identifying information.

Nevada stop-and-identify laws require citizens to identify themselves to officers, but the law only requires citizens to carry identification while driving. When stopped by police while driving, the driver is legally required to present proof of their identity by Nevada law.

- Fifteen states grant police authority to ask questions, with varying wording, but do not explicitly impose an obligation to respond:

- In Montana, police "may request" identifying information;
- In Ohio, identifying information may be required "when requested"; an obligation exists only when the police suspect a person is committing, has committed, or is about to commit a criminal offense, is witness to a violent felony offense, or is witness to an attempt or conspiracy to commit a violent felony offense;
- In 12 states (Alabama, Delaware, Florida, Illinois, Kansas, Missouri, Nebraska, New Hampshire, New York, North Dakota, Rhode Island, Utah, Wisconsin), police "may demand" identifying information. However, in New Hampshire for example (RSA 594:2), statutory language authorizing a "demand" for identity does not establish a legal requirement to provide documentation of identity, or even a requirement to respond at all. Further, a law enforcement officer is authorized to make such "demand" only of individuals for "whom he has reason to suspect is committing, has committed or is about to commit a crime". Officers in New Hampshire may not arrest citizens for merely failing to provide identification. Similarly, in Illinois, officers "may demand" a person to identify themselves, but a refusal to do so amounts to mere argument with police, which is protected under the 1st Amendment. As such, refusing to identify yourself in Illinois is not obstructing identification or obstructing justice.

- Identifying information varies, but typically includes

- Name, address, and an explanation of the person's actions;
- In some cases it also includes the person's intended destination, the person's date of birth (Indiana and Ohio), or written identification if available (Colorado). Ohio does not require the person's intended destination. Ohio requires only name, address, or date of birth. Date of birth is not required if the age of the person is an element to the crime (such as underage drinking, curfew violation, etc.) that the person is reasonably suspected of. Indiana requires either name, address, and date of birth, or driver's license, if in the person's possession, and only applies if the person was stopped for an infraction or ordinance violation.
- Arizona law, apparently written specifically to codify the holding in Hiibel, requires a person's "true full name".
- Nevada law, which requires a person to "identify himself or herself", apparently requires only that the person state their name.
- Texas law requires a person to provide their name, residence address and date of birth if lawfully arrested and asked by police. (A detained person or witness of a crime is not required to provide any identifying information; however, it is a crime for a detained person or witness to give a false name.) Texas P.C. 38.02

- In four states (Arkansas, Florida, Georgia, and Rhode Island), failure to identify oneself is one factor to be considered in a decision to arrest. In all but Rhode Island, the consideration arises in the context of loitering or prowling.
- Seven states (Arizona, Florida, Indiana, Louisiana, New Mexico, Ohio, and Vermont) explicitly impose a criminal penalty for noncompliance with the obligation to identify oneself.
- Maryland requires a person to respond to identification request if the person is wearing, carrying (open or concealed), or transporting a handgun.
- Virginia's criminal code obligates an individual going upon the property of another with intent to hunt, fish, or trap to identify themselves upon demand of the landowner or the landowner's agents (§ 18.2–133), and further imposes an affirmative duty on law enforcement to enforce that section (§ 18.2–136.1).

As of February 2011, the validity of a law requiring that a person detained provide anything more than stating their name has not come before the U.S. Supreme Court.

However in Hiibel, the court specifically ruled regarding a verbal statement of name only. Other court rulings indicate that there is no requirement per se to provide physical identification, except when under arrest or while operating a motor vehicle on public roads.

This is an important distinction, and often misunderstood by both the public and police officers.

=== Interaction with other laws ===
In states whose "stop and identify laws" do not directly impose penalties, a lawful arrest must be for violation of some other law, such as one to the effect of "resisting, obstructing, or delaying a peace officer". For example, the Nevada "stop and identify" law challenged in Hiibel did not impose a penalty on a person who refused to comply, but the Justice Court of Union Township, Nevada, determined that Hiibel's refusal to identify himself constituted a violation of Nevada "obstructing" law.

A similar conclusion regarding the interaction between Utah "stop and identify" and "obstructing" laws was reached in Oliver v. Woods (10th Cir. 2000).

=== Interpretation by courts ===
"Stop and identify" laws in different states that appear to be nearly identical may be different in effect because of interpretations by state courts. For example, California "stop and identify" law, Penal Code §647(e) had wording similar to the Nevada law upheld in Hiibel, but a California appellate court, in People v. Solomon (1973), 33 Cal.App.3d 429 construed the law to require "credible and reliable" identification that carries a "reasonable assurance" of its authenticity. Using this construction, the U.S. Supreme Court held the law to be void for vagueness in Kolender v. Lawson, 461 U.S. 352 (1983).

Some courts have recognized a distinction authorizing police to demand identifying information and specifically imposing an obligation of a suspect to respond. Other courts have apparently interpreted demand to impose an obligation on the detainee to comply.

Wording and interpretation by state courts of "obstructing" laws also varies; for example, New York "obstructing" law apparently requires physical rather than simply verbal obstruction; likewise, a violation of the Colorado "obstructing" law appears to require use or threat of use of physical force. However, the Colorado Supreme Court held in Dempsey v. People, No. 04SC362 (2005) that refusing to provide identification was an element in the "totality of the circumstances" that could constitute obstructing an officer, even when actual physical interference was not employed. Utah "obstructing" law does not require a physical act, but merely a failure to follow a "lawful order ... necessary to effect the ... detention"; a divided court in Oliver v. Woods concluded that failure to present identification constituted a violation of that law.

It is not universally agreed that, absent a "stop and identify law", there is no obligation for a detainee to identify themself. For example, as the U.S. Supreme Court noted in Hiibel, California "stop and identify" statute was voided in Kolender v. Lawson. But in People v. Long, decided four years after Kolender, a California appellate court found no constitutional impropriety in a police officer's demand for written identification from a detainee whom they reasonably suspect of having committed a crime. The issue before the Long court was a request for suppression of evidence uncovered in a search of the defendant's wallet, so the issue of refusal to present identification was not directly addressed; however, the author of the Long opinion had apparently concluded in a 1980 case that failure to identify oneself did not provide a basis for arrest. Nonetheless, some cite Long in maintaining that refusal to present written identification constitutes obstructing an officer. Others disagree, and maintain that persons detained by police in California cannot be compelled to identify themselves.

Some courts, e.g., State v. Flynn (Wis. 1979) and People v. Loudermilk (Calif. 1987), have held that police may perform a search for written identification if a suspect refuses to provide it; a later California decision, People v. Garcia (2006), strongly disagreed.

In the case of Utah v. Strieff (2016), the U.S. Supreme Court ruled that an officer's stop of Edward Strieff and his demand for identification from Strieff was unlawful under Utah state law, but that the evidence collected pursuant to the stop was admissible due to the determination that Strieff was subject to a pre-existing arrest warrant. Therefore, the pre-existing warrant "attenuated" the unlawful stop-and-identify.

In North Carolina, State v. White interpreted North Carolina's "Resisting officers" statute to apply to suspects who fail to identify themselves to police officers. Conversely, West Virginia's courts decided that their resisting arrest statute did not include individuals who refused to identify themselves.

== Other countries ==
Many countries allow police to demand identification and arrest people who do not carry any (or refuse to produce such). Normally these countries provide all residents with national identity cards, which have the identity information the police would want to know, including citizenship. Foreign visitors need to have their passport available to show at all times. In some cases national identity cards from certain other countries are accepted.

For example, in Portugal it is compulsory to carry the state ID card at all times. This card is called the Cartão de Cidadão (Citizen Card); it is an electronic card which includes biometric information, ID number, social security number, fiscal information, et cetera. Police can only ask for the ID card in public or a place open to public and only if there is a reasonable suspicion the person committed a crime. A certified copy of the ID card can be presented in such situations. If a citizen does not carry the ID card or its certified copy, the police will escort the person to the police department to remain detained until clear identification can be obtained.

In other countries like Australia, Canada, New Zealand, and the United Kingdom police generally have no power to demand identification unless they have a statutory power to do so. In the United Kingdom, drivers stopped under the Road Traffic Act are required to provide their details to an officer in uniform, however pedestrians or passengers in a vehicle are not required to provide any details to an officer unless they are placed under arrest. The only time an officer can demand identification from a pedestrian is under Section 50 of the Police Reform Act which states that an officer can demand the name and address only if the person is committing, or about to commit a public order offence. Some countries have laws that require pedestrians, drivers, and passengers to produce their licence (for drivers) or state their name, address, etc. when stopped by police. Police may also require people to identify themselves if they have reasonable grounds to believe that they have committed a crime.

== See also ==
- Brown v. Texas
- Hiibel v. Sixth Judicial District Court of Nevada
- Kolender v. Lawson
- Miranda v. Arizona
- Obligation of identification
- Terry stop
- Loitering
- Carding (police policy)
- Stop and frisk
