= Racial profiling =

Law-enforcement practice

Racial profiling or ethnic profiling is the offender profiling, selective enforcement or selective prosecution based on race or ethnicity, rather than individual suspicion or evidence. This practice involves using discriminatory practices and often relies on negative stereotypes. Racial profiling can include disproportionate stop-and-searches, traffic stops, and the use of surveillance technology for facial identification. Racial profiling can occur de jure (when state policies target specific racial groups) or de facto (when the practice occurs outside official legislation). Critics argue that racial profiling is discriminatory as it disproportionately targets people of color. Supporters claim it can be an effective tool for preventing crime but acknowledge that it should be closely monitored and used in a way that respects civil rights.

The subject of racial profiling has sparked debate between philosophers who disagree on its moral status. Some believe that racial profiling is morally permissible under certain circumstances, whereas others argue it is never morally permissible.

== Justifications ==
Those who argue in favor of racial profiling usually set some conditions for racial profiling to be justified, typically fairness, evidence-basedness and non-abusiveness. Proponents of racial profiling generally argue that, if these conditions are met, it can be an efficient tool for crime prevention because it allows law enforcement to focus their efforts on groups that are according to crime statistics and correlates of crime more likely to commit crimes.

Mathias Risse and Richard Zeckhauser provide a consequentialist analysis of racial profiling, weighing the benefits and costs against each other. They conclude that racial profiling is morally permissible because the harms done to the search subjects are fewer than the potential benefits for society in terms of security. Moreover, the (innocent) subjects themselves also benefit because they will live a safer environment overall.

Risse and Zeckhauser conclude that the objections to racial profiling are not rooted in the practice per se but in background injustice in our societies. Instead of banning racial profiling, they argue, efforts should be made to remedy racial inequality in our societies.

== Criticism ==
Criticisms of racial profiling can be divided into objections against profiling in general and objections specifically against profiles about race. For examples of the former, some argue that making inferences based on purely demographic data is inegalitarian, and others that such demographic inferences are intellectually unreliable. For an example of the latter, some opponents of racial profiling claim that those who support racial profiling underestimate its collective harms and fail to recognize how the practice can exacerbate racism.

Adam Omar Hosein argues that racial profiling may be permissible under certain circumstances, but the present circumstances (in the United States) make it unjust. The costs of racial profiling for black communities in the U.S. are much higher than Risse and Zeckhauer account for. Racial profiling can make targeted individuals assume they have an inferior political status, which can lead to an alienation from the state. This can make racial profiling turn into a self-fulfilling prophecy when an individual is more likely to commit a crime because they are perceived as a criminal.

Hosein also points to an epistemic problem. Arguments in favor of racial profiling are based on the premise that there is a correlation between belonging to a specific racial group and committing certain crimes. However, should such a correlation exist, it is based on data that is skewed by previous racial profiling. Because more subjects of a certain racial group were targeted, more crime was registered in this group. It is therefore epistemically unjustified to assume that this group commits more crime. Racial profiling intersects with gendered profiling. Some argue profiling of men contributes to sex differences in crime.

== By country ==
=== Canada ===
Accusations of racial profiling of visible minorities who accuse police of targeting them due to their ethnic background is a growing concern in Canada. In 2005, the Kingston Police released the first study ever in Canada which pertains to racial profiling. The study focused on the city of Kingston, Ontario, a small city where most of the inhabitants are white. The study showed that black-skinned people were 3.7 times more likely to be pulled over by police than white-skinned people, while Asian and White people are less likely to be pulled over than Black people. Several police organizations condemned this study and suggested more studies like this would make them hesitant to pull over visible minorities.

Canadian Aboriginals are more likely to be charged with crimes, particularly on reserves. The Canadian crime victimization survey does not collect data on the ethnic origin of perpetrators, so comparisons between incidence of victimizations and incidence of charging are impossible. Although aboriginal persons make up 3.6% of Canada's population, they account for 20% of Canada's prison population. This may show how racial profiling increases effectiveness of police, or be a result of racial profiling, as they are watched more intensely than others.

In February 2010, an investigation of the Toronto Star daily newspaper found that black people across Toronto were three times more likely to be stopped and documented by police than white people. To a lesser extent, the same seemed true for people described by police as having "brown" skin (South Asians, Arabs and Latinos). This was the result of an analysis of 1.7 million contact cards filled out by Toronto Police officers in the period 2003–2008.

The Ontario Human Rights Commission states that "police services have acknowledged that racial profiling does occur and have taken [and are taking] measures to address [the issue], including upgrading training for officers, identifying officers at risk of engaging in racial profiling, and improving community relations". Ottawa Police addressed this issue and planned on implementing a new policy regarding officer racially profiling persons, "the policy explicitly forbids officers from investigating or detaining anyone based on their race and will force officers to go through training on racial profiling". This policy was implemented after the 2008 incident where an African Canadian woman was strip searched by members of the Ottawa police. There is a video showing the strip search where one witnesses the black woman being held to the ground and then having her bra and shirt cut ripped/cut off by a member of the Ottawa Police Force which was released to the viewing of the public in 2010.

=== China ===
According to The New York Times, the Chinese government has been racially profiling Uyghurs using facial recognition and surveillance technology. Uyghurs are a Muslim minority living primarily in China's Western province of Xinjiang. The report described these methods as "automated racism". In research projects aided by European institutions it has combined the facial output with people's DNA, to create an ethnic profile. The DNA was collected at the prison camps, which are interning more than one million Uyghurs, as had been corroborated in November 2019 by data leaks, such as the China Cables.

=== Germany ===
In February 2012, the first court ruling concerning racial profiling in German police policy, allowing police to use skin color and "non-German ethnic origin" to select persons who will be asked for identification in spot-checks for illegal immigrants. Subsequently, it was decided legal for a person submitted to a spot-check to compare the policy to that of the SS in public. A higher court later overruled the earlier decision declaring the racial profiling unlawful and in violation of anti-discrimination provisions in Art. 3 Basic Law and the General Equal Treatment Act of 2006.

The civil rights organisation Büro zur Umsetzung von Gleichbehandlung (Office for the Implementation of Equal Treatment) makes a distinction between criminal profiling, which is legitimate in Germany, and ethnic profiling, which is not.

According to a 2016 report by the Interior ministry in Germany, there had been an increase in hate crimes and violence against migrant groups in Germany. The reports concluded that there were more than 10 attacks per day against migrants in Germany in 2016. This report from Germany garnered the attention of the United Nations, which alleged that people of African descent face widespread discrimination in Germany.

A 2017 statement by the Office of the UN High Commissioner for Rights after a visit to Germany states: "While the Basic Law guarantees equality, prohibits racial discrimination, and states that human dignity is inviolable, it is not being enforced." and calls racial profiling by police officials endemic. Recommendations include legal reform, establishing an independent complaint system, training and continuing education for the police, and investigations to promote accountability and remedy.

=== Ethiopia ===
Ethnic profiling against Tigrayans occurred during the Tigray War that started in November 2020, with Ethiopians of Tigrayan ethnicity being put on indefinite leave from Ethiopian Airlines or refused permission to board, prevented from overseas travel, and an "order of identifying ethnic Tigrayans from all government agencies and NGOs" being used by federal police to request a list of ethnic Tigrayans from an office of the World Food Programme. Tigrayans' houses were arbitrarily searched and Tigrayan bank accounts were suspended. Ethnic Tigrayan members of Ethiopian components of United Nations peacekeeping missions were disarmed and some forcibly flown back to Ethiopia, at the risk of torture or execution, according to United Nations officials.

=== Israel ===
In 1972, terrorists from the Japanese Red Army launched an attack that led to the deaths of at least 24 people at Ben Gurion Airport. Since then, security at the airport has relied on a number of fundamentals, including a heavy focus on what Raphael Ron, former director of security at Ben Gurion, terms the "human factor", which he generalized as "the inescapable fact that terrorist attacks are carried out by people who can be found and stopped by an effective security methodology." As part of its focus on this so-called "human factor", Israeli security officers interrogate travelers using racial profiling, singling out those who appear to be Arab based on name or physical appearance. Additionally, all passengers, including those who do not appear to be of Arab descent, are questioned as to why they are traveling to Israel, followed by several general questions about the trip in order to search for inconsistencies. Although numerous civil rights groups have demanded an end to the profiling, the Israeli government maintains that it is both effective and unavoidable. According to Ariel Merari, an Israeli terrorism expert, "it would be foolish not to use profiling when everyone knows that most terrorists come from certain ethnic groups. They are likely to be Muslim and young, and the potential threat justifies inconveniencing a certain ethnic group."

=== Japan ===
In December 2021, the U.S. Embassy in Tokyo, Japan warned of "suspected racial profiling" by police across Japan against non-Japanese residents. Since 2022, the number of people coming forward about racial profiling complaints against police officers in Japan has greatly expanded. In January 2024, three foreign-born residents of Japan filed a lawsuit which alleged they were repeatedly questioned by police based on their physical appearances, with one plaintiff, Pakistan-born Syed Zain, claiming that he was harassed by police at least 70 times since arriving in Japan in 2002. On 30 April 2024, an article was published by The Mainichi which provided some detail how an investigation found that numerous Japanese police officers had a high rate of racial profiling incidents which involved the targeting of foreigners.

One former officer from western Japan saw police consistently being ordered by senior officers to target foreigners for questioning, ID checks and searches. This officer claimed that patrol officers were told to target foreigners. People with Korean, black and Southeast Asian roots were among those most frequently targeted. White people were less targeted, often being considered by police to be either "tourists" or having "a Japanese partner." On May 8, 2022, The New York Times reported that racial profiling was "prevalent" in Japan, but not often documented.

=== Mexico ===
The General Law on Population (Reglamento de la Ley General de Poblacion) of 2000 in Mexico has been cited as being used to racially profile and abuse immigrants to Mexico. Mexican law makes illegal immigration punishable by law and allows law officials great discretion in identifying and questioning illegal immigrants. Mexico has been criticized for its immigration policy. Chris Hawley of USA Today stated that "Mexico has a law that is no different from Arizona's", referring to legislation which gives local police forces the power to check documents of people suspected of being in the country illegally. Immigration and human rights activists have also noted that Mexican authorities frequently engage in racial profiling, harassment, and shakedowns against migrants from Central America.

=== Sri Lanka ===
Ethnic Sri Lankan Tamils traveling from the Northern Province and Eastern Province in Sri Lanka have to compulsory register with the Police and mandatory carry a police certificate as per the Prevention of Terrorism Act and emergency regulations if found not living in the house in the certificate they could be arrested. In 2007 Tamils were expelled from Colombo. The move to expel these people drew wide criticism of the government. The United States Embassy in Sri Lanka condemned the act, asking the government of Sri Lanka to ensure the constitutional rights of all the citizens of the country. Norway also condemned the act, describing it as a clear violation of international human rights law. Their press release urged government of Sri Lanka to desist from any further enforced removals. Canada has also condemned the action. Human rights groups, Local think tank and other observers have termed this act as "ethnic cleansing". The media group said that this type of act reminds people of what "Hitler did to the Jews", and the Asian Center of Human Rights urged India to intervene.

=== Spain ===
Racial profiling by police forces in Spain is a common practice. A study by the University of Valencia, found that people of color are up to ten times more likely to be stopped by the police on the street. Amnesty International accused Spanish authorities of using racial and ethnic profiling, with police singling out people who are not white in the street and public places.

In 2011, the United Nations Committee on the Elimination of Racial Discrimination (CERD) urged the Spanish government to take "effective measures" to ethnic profiling, including the modification of existing laws and regulations which permit its practice. In 2013, the UN Special Rapporteur, Mutuma Ruteere, described the practice of ethnic profiling by Spanish law enforcement officers "a persisting and pervasive problem". In 2014, the Spanish government approved a law which prohibited racial profiling by police forces.

=== United Kingdom ===
Racial issues have been prevalent in the UK for a long time. For example, following the arrival of Windrush migrants from the Caribbean and West Indies after the Second World War, racial tensions began to flare up in the country - see the Notting Hill Race Riot. The most recent statistics from the Migration Observatory at the University of Oxford in 2019 show that people born outside of the UK made up 14% of the UK's population or 9.5 million people. Black Britons make up 3% of the population and Indian Britons occupy 2.3% of the population with the remainder being largely EU or North American migrants.

An increase in knife crime in the capital in recent decades has led to an increase in police stop and search powers. However, there are concerns that these powers lead to discrimination and racial profiling with statistics showing that there were 54 stop and searches for every 1000 black people compared to just 6 for every 1000 white people. Following social dissatisfaction and claims of institutional racism, the Commission on Race and Ethnic Disparities published The report of the Commission on Race and Ethnic Disparities in 2021, finding overall that there was no institutional racism in the UK. The report and its findings were criticised by many including the United Nations working group who argued that the report 'attempts to normalise white supremacy' and could 'fuel racism'.

=== United States ===
In the United States, racial profiling is mainly used when referring to the disproportionate searching of African Americans, Hispanics, and other people of color.

According to an American College of Physicians study, 92% of Blacks, 78% of Latino Americans, 75% of Native Americans, and 61% of Asian Americans have "reported experiencing racial discrimination in the form of racial slurs, violence, threats, and harassment."

Racial profiling has roots in slavery and has grown with the rise of urbanization, conflated with gentrification. The US harbors a sense of fear and danger in people of color through the uncontested use of racial profiling in day-to-day interactions - from personal implicit biases, overt and covert racist laws and practices, and discriminatory law enforcement agencies.

Sociologist Robert Staples said that racial profiling in the U.S. is "not merely a collection of individual offenses", but rather a systemic phenomenon across American society, dating back to the era of slavery.

"At the root of the emergence of the modern Anglo-American police was the problem of changing social relations and conditions arising from industrialization and urbanization," says sociologist Dr. Tia Dafnos.

This is exemplified in the large wage and generational wealth gaps and workplace and housing discrimination that exist between the White and non-White populations. Racial profiling in policing institutions is not new, either. The modern American police force has taken inspiration and structure from slave patrols and as a result people in minority populations report high rates of unfair treatment by courts, unreasonable arrests and frisking, and hesitancy to call the police in times of need out of fear of discrimination.

The US Constitution's Fourth Amendment, which protects citizens from unreasonable search and seizure, was extended after a run of controversial court cases in the 1960s in which people of color were facing higher rates of frisking and intimidation. This extension says that police must obey the law while enforcing it. Although the Supreme Court has claimed continued adherence to objectivity in the face of Fourth Amendment cases, American police employ racial profiling with harmful consequences.

Recent incidents of racial profiling, often in mundane situations like traffic stops, have resulted in unnecessary violence and deaths. Data suggest that "African American and American Indian/Alaska Native women and men are killed by the police at higher rates" than their White counterparts, and Latinx men are killed at higher rates than White men. African American men are 2.5 times more likely to be killed by police than White men.

Unlawful and wrongful deaths, in the cases of George Floyd and Sonya Massey, have been attributed to extreme racial profiling and met with social media outburst and growing attention towards the Black Lives Matter and Say Her Name movements. The Terry v. Ohio court case of 1968 has also led to countless incidents of racial profiling in the US, as it allows police officers to stop an individual or vehicle without probable cause if they think an individual is committing a crime or about to commit a crime, although they must have a reasonable suspicion based on "specific and articulable facts". The driving while black phenomenon draws from data that supports that people of color disproportionately experience police shootings, traffic stops, searches, and arrests.

A Kavanaugh stop is a law enforcement practice in the United States in which federal agents can stop and detain a person based on their perceived ethnicity, spoken language, and occupation.

== See also ==
- Affirmative action
- Institutional racism
- Contempt of cop
- De-policing
- Driving while black
- Police misconduct
- Police harassment
- Presumption of guilt
- Henry Louis Gates arrest controversy
- Edward C. Lawson
- Social profiling
- Sentencing disparity
