= Ronald Hutchinson =

Ronald Hutchinson may refer to:

- Ron Hutchinson (ice hockey) (born 1936), ice hockey player
- Ron Hutchinson (jockey) (born 1927), jockey
- Harry Tate (Ronald Macdonald Hutchison, 1872–1940), English comedian
- Ron Hutchinson (screenwriter), screenwriter and playwright
- Ronald R. Hutchinson, behavioral scientist and plaintiff in Hutchinson v. Proxmire

== See also ==
- Ron Hutchison (born 1964), Canadian professional wrestler, trainer and promoter
