= Brown v. Texas =

- Supreme Court of the United States

Argued February 21, 1979 Decided June 25, 1979
- Full case name: Brown v. Texas
- Citations: 443 U.S. 47 (more) 99 S. Ct. 2637; 61 L. Ed. 2d 357

Holding
- The application of the Texas statute to detain appellant and require him to identify himself violated the Fourth Amendment because the officers lacked any reasonable suspicion to believe that appellant was engaged or had engaged in criminal conduct.

Court membership
- Chief Justice Warren E. Burger Associate Justices William J. Brennan Jr. · Potter Stewart; Byron White · Thurgood Marshall; Harry Blackmun · Lewis F. Powell Jr. William Rehnquist · John P. Stevens

Case opinion
- Majority: Burger, joined by unanimous

Laws applied
- Fourth Amendment

Brown v. Texas, 443 U.S. 47 (1979), was a United States Supreme Court case in which the Court determined that the defendant's arrest in El Paso, Texas for a refusal to identify himself after being seen and questioned in a high-crime area was not based on a reasonable suspicion of wrongdoing and thus violated the Fourth Amendment. It is an important case in relation to stop-and-identify statutes in the United States.

The decision was written by Chief Justice Warren Burger and unanimously supported by the other justices. His summary of the factual elements of the case includes the following:

Two police officers, while cruising near noon in a patrol car, observed appellant and another man walking away from one another in an alley in an area with a high incidence of drug traffic. They stopped and asked appellant to identify himself and explain what he was doing. One officer testified that he stopped appellant because the situation "looked suspicious and we had never seen that subject in that area before." The officers did not claim to suspect appellant of any specific misconduct, nor did they have any reason to believe that he was armed. When appellant refused to identify himself, he was arrested for violation of a Texas statute which makes it a criminal act for a person to refuse to give his name and address to an officer "who has lawfully stopped him and requested the information."

The finding held that:

The application of the Texas statute to detain appellant and require him to identify himself violated the Fourth Amendment because the officers lacked any reasonable suspicion to believe that appellant was engaged or had engaged in criminal conduct. Detaining appellant to require him to identify himself constituted a seizure of his person subject to the requirement of the Fourth Amendment that the seizure be "reasonable."

While the application of the relevant Texas law was held unconstitutional in the case, the constitutional status of the law itself was not addressed.

The statute in question, Tex. Penal Code § 38.02(a), has since been revised to criminalize the refusal to identify oneself only after being lawfully arrested.

== See also ==
- Terry v. Ohio, 1968
- Hiibel v. Sixth Judicial District Court of Nevada, 2004
