= Hiibel v. Sixth Judicial District Court of Nevada =

- Supreme Court of the United States

Argued March 22, 2004 Decided June 21, 2004
- Full case name: Larry D. Hiibel v. Sixth Judicial District Court of Nevada, Humboldt County, et al.
- Citations: 542 U.S. 177 (more) 124 S. Ct. 2451; 159 L. Ed. 2d 292; 2004 U.S. LEXIS 4385; 72 U.S.L.W. 4509; 17 Fla. L. Weekly Fed. S 406

Case history
- Prior: Defendant convicted, Justice Court of Union Township, Humboldt County; affirmed, Sixth Judicial District Court, Humboldt County; affirmed, 59 P.3d 1201 (Nev. 2002); cert. granted, 540 U.S. 965 (2003).
- Subsequent: Rehearing denied, 542 U.S. 960 (2004).

Holding
- Laws requiring suspects to identify themselves during investigative stops by law enforcement officers do not violate the Fourth Amendment, and do not necessarily violate the Fifth Amendment.

Court membership
- Chief Justice William Rehnquist Associate Justices John P. Stevens · Sandra Day O'Connor; Antonin Scalia · Anthony Kennedy; David Souter · Clarence Thomas; Ruth Bader Ginsburg · Stephen Breyer

Case opinions
- Majority: Kennedy, joined by Rehnquist, O'Connor, Scalia, Thomas
- Dissent: Stevens
- Dissent: Breyer, joined by Souter, Ginsburg

Laws applied
- U.S. Const. amends. IV, V; Nev. Rev. Stat. § 171.123(3)

Hiibel v. Sixth Judicial District Court of Nevada, 542 U.S. 177 (2004), is a United States Supreme Court case in which the Court held that a statute requiring suspects to disclose their names during a valid Terry stop does not violate the Fourth Amendment if the statute first requires reasonable suspicion of criminal involvement, and does not violate the Fifth Amendment if there is no allegation that their names could have caused an incrimination.

Under the rubric of Terry v. Ohio, 392 U.S. 1 (1968), the minimal intrusion on a suspect's privacy, and the legitimate need of law enforcement officers to quickly dispel suspicion that an individual is engaged in criminal activity, justified requiring a suspect to disclose his or her name. The Court also held that the identification requirement did not violate Hiibel's Fifth Amendment rights since he did not articulate a reasonable belief that his name would be used to incriminate him; however, the Court left open the possibility that Fifth Amendment privilege might apply in a situation where there was an articulated reasonable belief that giving a name could be incriminating.

The Hiibel decision was narrow in that it applied only to states that have stop and identify statutes. Consequently, individuals in states without such statutes cannot be lawfully arrested solely for refusing to identify themselves during a Terry stop.

== Background of the case ==
Nevada has a "stop-and-identify" law that allows police officers to detain any person they encounter "under circumstances which reasonably indicate that the person has committed, is committing or is about to commit a crime"; the person may be detained only to "ascertain his identity and the suspicious circumstances surrounding his presence abroad." In turn, the law requires the person detained to "identify himself", but does not compel the person to answer any other questions put to him by the officer. The Nevada Supreme Court has interpreted "identify himself" to mean to merely state his name. As of April 2008, 23 other states have similar laws.

On the evening of May 21, 2000, the sheriff's department in Humboldt County, Nevada received a report that a man had assaulted a woman in a red and silver GMC truck on Grass Valley Road. The responding deputy found a truck parked on the side of the road. A man was smoking a cigarette beside the truck, and a young woman was sitting inside it. The deputy observed skid marks in the gravel behind the vehicle, leading him to believe the vehicle had come to a sudden stop.

The deputy explained to the man that there had been a report of a fight between the man and the young woman, and asked the man if he had any identification on him. The man protested that he had no reason to provide identification, and became ill-tempered when the deputy continued to press him for his identification. The man then asked the deputy what crime he was being accused of, as the deputy continued his requests for identification, stating that he was "conducting an investigation". The man persisted in his refusal to provide identification, asking instead to be handcuffed and taken to jail. The deputy continued to ask for the man's identification, stating that the man would face arrest if he did not cooperate and provide identification. In response, the man declared he would not cooperate because he had not committed any crime. He then turned around and was arrested by the deputy.

That man was Larry Dudley Hiibel, the petitioner in this case, and the young woman was his daughter Mimi Hiibel. Larry Hiibel was charged with "willfully resist[ing], delay[ing], or obstruct[ing] a public officer in discharging or attempting to discharge any legal duty of his office." In the Justice Court for Union Township, Nevada, Hiibel was convicted of this charge and fined $250. He appealed to the Sixth Judicial District Court, which affirmed the conviction. He then appealed to the Nevada Supreme Court, arguing that the requirement that he identify himself to any police officer upon request violated the Fourth Amendment prohibition on unreasonable searches and seizures and his Fifth Amendment rights against self-incrimination. The Nevada Supreme Court rejected these arguments, and Hiibel asked the US Supreme Court to hear the case.

== Majority opinion ==
Stop-and-identify laws have their roots in early English vagrancy laws under which suspected vagrants were subject to arrest unless they gave a "good account" of themselves; this practice, in turn, derived from the common-law power of any person to arrest suspicious persons and detain them until they gave "a good account" of themselves. Modern stop-and-identify laws combine aspects of the old vagrancy laws with a guide for police officers conducting investigatory stops, such as those authorized under Terry v. Ohio, 392 U.S. 1 (1968).

However, the Court has identified a constitutional difficulty with many modern vagrancy laws. In Papachristou v. Jacksonville, 405 U.S. 156 (1972), the Court held that a traditional vagrancy law was void for vagueness because its "broad scope and imprecise terms denied proper notice to potential offenders and permitted police officers to exercise unfettered discretion in the enforcement of the law." In Brown v. Texas, 443 U.S. 47 (1979), the Court struck down the application of Texas's stop-and-identify statute against Brown. They held that the Fourth Amendment requires reasonable suspicion to believe that an individual had committed, was committing, or was going to commit a crime before an individual can be required to identify himself, and that the presence of an individual in a known drug area cannot establish reasonable suspicion without more. And in Kolender v. Lawson, 461 U.S. 352 (1983), the Court struck down a California stop-and-identify law that required a suspect to provide "credible and reliable identification" upon request. The words "credible and reliable" were vague because they "provided no standard for determining what a suspect must do to comply with [the law], resulting in virtually unrestrained power to arrest and charge persons with a violation."

"The present case begins where our prior cases left off. Here there is no question that the initial stop was based on reasonable suspicion, satisfying the Fourth Amendment requirements noted in Brown. Further, the petitioner has not alleged that the statute is unconstitutionally vague, as in Kolender. Here the Nevada statute is narrower and precise." The Nevada Supreme Court had held that the Nevada statute required only that the suspect divulge his name; presumably, he could do so without handing over any documents whatsoever. As long as the suspect tells the officer his name, he has satisfied the dictates of the Nevada stop-and-identify law.

The narrow requirements of Nevada's stop-and-identify law meant that it did not run afoul of the Fourth Amendment. "In the ordinary course a police officer is free to ask a person for identification without implicating the Fourth Amendment." Since Terry, it has been clear that a police officer who reasonably suspects that a person is involved in criminal activity may detain a person long enough to dispel that suspicion. Questions related to a person's identity are a "routine and accepted part of many Terry stops." Knowing a person's identity may, of course, help to clear a suspect and divert the attention of the police to another suspect. On the other hand, knowing the suspect's name may just as quickly confirm to the officer that the person is wanted for another, unrelated crime. In cases such as this, where the police are investigating a domestic dispute, officers "need to know whom they are dealing with in order to assess the situation, the threat to their own safety, and possible danger to the potential victim." "The request for identity has an immediate relation to the purpose, rationale, and practical demands of a Terry stop. The threat of criminal sanction helps ensure that the request for identity does not become a legal nullity." Balancing the intrusion into the individual's privacy against the extent to which the stop-and-identify law promotes legitimate government interests, the Court concluded that the Fourth Amendment did not prohibit Nevada from making it a crime for a person detained under conditions of Terry to refuse to disclose his name to a police officer upon request.

Furthermore, the officer's request that Hiibel identify himself did not implicate Hiibel's Fifth Amendment privilege against self-incrimination. There was no "articulated real and appreciable fear that [Hiibel's] name would be used to incriminate him, or that it 'would furnish a link in the chain of evidence needed to prosecute' him." Because Hiibel did not articulate reasonable belief that his name could be used as an incriminating piece of evidence, he could not invoke the Fifth Amendment privilege in refusing to disclose it.

== Dissenting opinions ==
Justice Stevens opined that the Court's precedent required it to strike down Nevada's stop-and-identify law. Under the Court's Terry jurisprudence, a suspect has always had the right to refuse to answer questions put to him by police officers during a Terry stop. And the Fifth Amendment privilege had always attached during custodial interrogations because information extorted by the police during such interrogations is unavoidably testimonial. Why else would the police ask for a person's name, if not to determine whether that person was either wanted for committing a crime or directly suspected of committing a crime? "The officer in this case told [Hiibel] that he was conducting an investigation and needed to see some identification. As the target of that investigation, [Hiibel], in my view, acted well within his rights when he opted to stand mute. Accordingly, I respectfully dissent."

Justice Breyer noted that

the Court wrote that an 'officer may ask the [Terry] detainee a moderate number of questions to determine his identity and to try to obtain information confirming or dispelling the officer's suspicions. But the detainee is not obliged to respond.' Berkemer v. McCarty, 468 U.S. 420 (1984) (emphasis added).... the Court's statement in Berkemer, while technically dicta, is the kind of strong dicta that the legal community typically takes as a statement of the law. And that law has remained undisturbed for more than 20 years. There is no good reason now to reject this generation-old statement of the law.

Justice Breyer also expressed a "slippery-slope" concern that the majority's opinion would lead to allowing the police to ask follow-up questions, such as what the person's license number is, or where a person lives, without running afoul of constitutional protections.

== See also ==
- List of United States Supreme Court cases, volume 542
- List of United States Supreme Court cases
