= Belotti =

Belotti is an Italian surname. Notable people with the surname include:

- Amelia Belotti (born 1988), Argentine handball player
- Andrea Belotti (born 1993), Italian footballer
- Bortolo Belotti (1877–1944), Italian politician
- Davide Belotti (born 1972), Italian association football coach and former defender
- Elena Gianini Belotti (1929–2022), Italian writer, teacher, and activist
- Francis X. Belotti (1923–2024), American lawyer and politician
- Frank P. Belotti (1898–1972), American politician
- Laura Belotti (born 1966), Italian swimmer
- Lino Bortolo Belotti (1930–2018), Italian former Auxiliary Bishop of the Diocese of Bergamo
- Marco Belotti (born 1988), Italian freestyle swimmer
- George Belotti (1934–2009), American football offensive lineman
- Mauro Belotti (born 1984), Italian footballer
- Valentina Belotti (born 1980), Italian mountain runner, world champion in 2009

== See also ==
- Bellotti, a surname
- Bilotti, a surname
- Ferrari Belotti, a company
