= City of Los Angeles v. Lyons =

- Supreme Court of the United States

Argued November 2, 1982 Decided April 20, 1983
- Full case name: City of Los Angeles v. Lyons
- Citations: 461 U.S. 95 (more) 103 S. Ct. 1660; 75 L. Ed. 2d 675; 51 U.S.L.W. 4424

Case history
- Prior: Lyons v. City of Los Angeles, 615 F.2d 1243 (9th Cir. 1980); cert. denied, 449 U.S. 934 (1980); 656 F.2d 417 (9th Cir. 1981); stay granted, 453 U.S. 1308 (1981); cert. granted, 455 U.S. 937 (1982).

Holding
- A plaintiff must show a sufficiently plausible threat of future injury to possess standing to sue.

Court membership
- Chief Justice Warren E. Burger Associate Justices William J. Brennan Jr. · Byron White; Thurgood Marshall · Harry Blackmun; Lewis F. Powell Jr. · William Rehnquist; John P. Stevens · Sandra Day O'Connor

Case opinions
- Majority: White, joined by Burger, Powell, Rehnquist, O'Connor
- Dissent: Marshall, joined by Brennan, Blackmun, Stevens

Laws applied
- U.S. Const. art. III

City of Los Angeles v. Lyons, 461 U.S. 95 (1983), was a United States Supreme Court decision holding that the plaintiff, Adolph Lyons, lacked standing to challenge the Los Angeles city police department's use of chokeholds.

== Background ==
In 1976, Adolph Lyons was stopped by four white officers of the Los Angeles Police Department (LAPD) for driving with a broken tail light. The unarmed 24-year-old was ordered to leave his vehicle by officers with guns drawn and to spread his legs and put his hands on top of his head. After being frisked, Lyons put his hands down. That prompted one officer to grab his hands and slam them against his head.

"Although Lyons offered no resistance or threat whatsoever, the officers, without provocation or justification, seized Lyons and applied a 'chokehold'... rendering him unconsciousness and causing damage to his larynx." He woke up lying face down in the road with soiled underwear and blood and dirt in his mouth. The officers gave him a traffic citation and sent him on his way.

City of L.A. officers often used the chokehold in many situations where they are not threatened by use of deadly force. The officers were directed and encouraged to use the chokehold by the City even though numerous people had been injured by its use. Lyons was fearful of any other interactions with the police for fear of being choked again. Lyons claimed this interfered with his First, Fourth, Eighth, and Fourteenth Amendment rights. "Injunctive relief was sought against the use of the control holds 'except in situations where the proposed victim of said control reasonably appears to be threatening the immediate use of deadly force.' Count VI sought declaratory relief against the City, i. e., a judgment that use of the chokeholds absent the threat of immediate use of deadly force is a per se violation of various constitutional rights."

Lyons introduced evidence from 1975 to 1983 that 16 people, including 12 African-Americans, had been killed by the LAPD using chokeholds.

== Decision ==
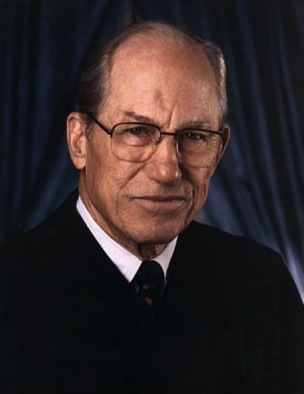
Byron White, Associate Justice of the Supreme Court of the United States, who wrote the majority opinion

In an opinion authored by Justice White, the Court held 5–4 that Lyons had failed to allege a sufficiently plausible threat of future injury to have standing to seek a broad injunction against the use of such chokeholds. To reach that threshold of plausible future injury, as opposed to merely "speculative", Lyons needed to plead and prove that the LAPD had a categorical policy of always applying a chokehold to every single person they stopped: "[E]ven assuming that Lyons would again be stopped for a traffic or other violation in the reasonably near future, it is untenable to assert, and the complaint made no such allegation, that strangleholds are applied by the Los Angeles police to every citizen who is stopped or arrested regardless of the conduct of the person stopped." The high court held that it was not enough for Lyons to point to his fear of such future injury based on the fact that he had actually been choked in the past.

Lyons, however, had standing to pursue his damages action since it was retrospective and the injury, of being subjected to a chokehold, was concrete and particular.

This case helped to establish the principle in American civil procedure that a plaintiff must meet a standing requirement for each form of relief sought.

== Dissenting opinion ==
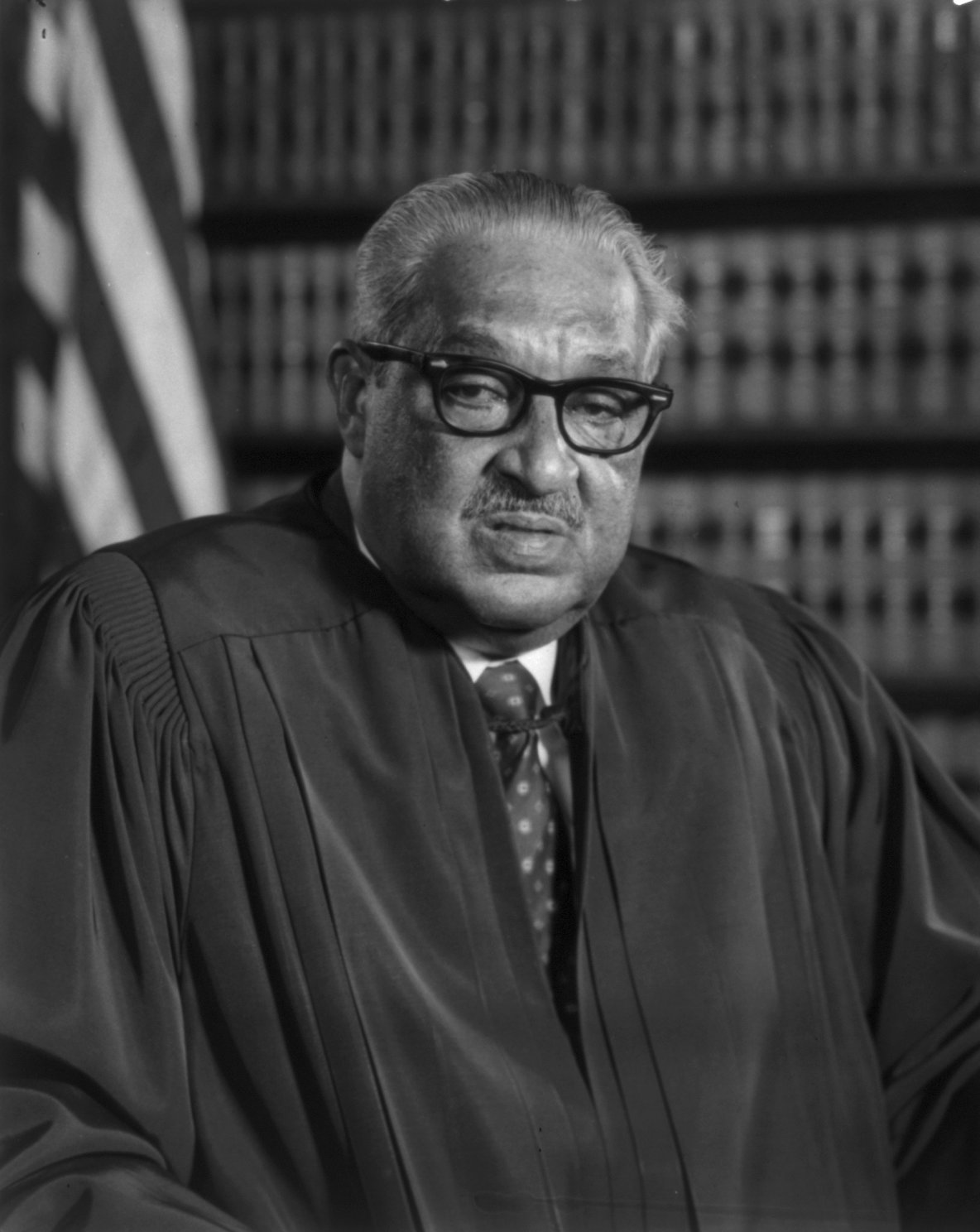
Thurgood Marshall, Associate Justice of the Supreme Court of the United States, who authored the minority opinion

Justice Marshall's dissent argued that the majority's test would immunize from review any widespread policy that deprives constitutional rights when individuals cannot show with certainty that they would be subject to a repeat violation. He also argued that the Court's traditional rule did not distinguish different forms of relief for standing purposes.

== Commentary ==
Based on Michelle Alexander's book The New Jim Crow Lyons' case is related to what is believed to be biased action towards certain races, in this case African-Americans. She asserts that it is hard for people of color like Lyons to prevail in the judicial process, like during the Jim Crow era. According to Alexander, one of the causes of such issues is the presence of implicit bias in the criminal justice system, including the courts and police officers. In support of Alexander's argument, Georgetown Law Professor Charles Lawrence noted, "The purposeful intent requirement found in Supreme Court equal protection doctrine, and in the court's interpretation of antidiscrimination laws disserved the value of equal citizenship expressed in those laws because many forms of racial bias are unconscious." As specified above, since Lyons' case involves legal system, unconscious bias may produce negative outcomes for African-Americans.

== See also ==
- List of United States Supreme Court cases, volume 461
- Police brutality
- Qualified immunity
- Terry stop
- Victimology
