= Planned Parenthood of Central Missouri v. Danforth =

Planned Parenthood v. Danforth
- Supreme Court of the United States

Argued March 23, 1976 Decided July 1, 1976
- Full case name: Planned Parenthood of Central Missouri, et al. v. John C. Danforth, et al.
- Citations: 428 U.S. 52 (more) 96 S. Ct. 2831; 49 L. Ed. 2d 788; 1976 U.S. LEXIS 13

Case history
- Prior: 392 F. Supp. 1362 (E.D. Mo. 1975); probable jurisdiction noted, 423 U.S. 819 (1975).

Court membership
- Chief Justice Warren E. Burger Associate Justices William J. Brennan Jr. · Potter Stewart; Byron White · Thurgood Marshall; Harry Blackmun · Lewis F. Powell Jr. William Rehnquist · John P. Stevens

Case opinions
- Majority: Blackmun, joined by Brennan, Stewart, Marshall, and Powell; Stevens (in all but Parts IV-D and IV-E); and Burger, White, and Rehnquist (in all but Parts IV-C, IV-D, IV-E, and IV-G)
- Concurrence: Stewart, joined by Powell
- Concur/dissent: White, joined by Burger, Rehnquist
- Concur/dissent: Stevens

Laws applied
- Missouri House Act 1211
- Superseded by
- Dobbs v. Jackson Women's Health Organization (2022)

Planned Parenthood of Central Missouri v. Danforth, 428 U.S. 52 (1976), is a United States Supreme Court case on abortion. The plaintiffs challenged the constitutionality of a Missouri statute regulating abortion. The Court upheld the right to have an abortion, declaring unconstitutional the statute's requirement of prior written consent from a parent (in the case of a minor) or a spouse (in the case of a married woman).

== Background of the case ==
=== The District Court's ruling ===
The plaintiffs brought suit in the United States District Court for the Eastern District of Missouri, seeking injunctive relief. Pursuant to 28 U.S.C. § 2281, the court convened a three-judge panel to try the case. The panel consisted of Eighth Circuit Judge William Hedgcock Webster, District Judge Harris Kenneth Wangelin, and Senior District Judge Roy Winfield Harper. The court held that Section 6(1) of the challenged act, which "prescribe[d] the standard of care which a person performing an abortion must exercise for the protection of the fetus" was unconstitutionally overbroad. It upheld the rest of the challenged act. Judge Webster concurred with the panel majority in finding 6(1) overboard and upholding "the constitutional validity of Section 2(2)[1] (defining "viability"), Section 3(2) (requiring the woman's written consent to an abortion), Section 10 (maintenance of records) and Section 11 (retention of records)." He dissented from the majority opinion with respect to four other provisions: 3(3) (spousal consent requirement), 3(4) (parental consent requirement), 7 (termination of parental rights if child is born alive), and 9 (prohibition of saline amniocentesis method of abortion). Planned Parenthood of Central Missouri v. Danforth, 392 F.Supp. 1362, 1365 (E.D. Missouri 1975).

== The Court's opinions ==
=== The majority opinion ===
The court struck down the provisions of the statute that required spousal and parental consent to obtain an abortion. The court upheld the statute's recordkeeping requirement for abortion facilities and physicians that perform abortions.

In addressing the issue of spousal consent, the Court upheld the lower court's decision that just as the state could not regulate or proscribe abortion during the first 12 weeks of pregnancy nor could the state "delegate to a spouse veto power."

== See also ==
- List of United States Supreme Court cases, volume 428
- Griswold v. Connecticut, 381 U.S. 479 (1965), established the constitutional right to privacy
- Roe v. Wade, 410 U.S. 113 (1973)
- Doe v. Bolton, 410 U.S. 179 (1973)
- Webster v. Reproductive Health Services, 492 U.S. 490 (1989)
- Planned Parenthood of Southeastern Pennsylvania v. Casey, 505 U.S. 833 (1992)
