= Roberts v. United States Jaycees =

- Supreme Court of the United States

Argued April 18, 1984 Decided July 3, 1984
- Full case name: Kathryn R. Roberts, Acting Commissioner, Minnesota Department of Human Rights, et al. v. United States Jaycees.
- Citations: 468 U.S. 609 (more) 104 S. Ct. 3244; 82 L. Ed. 2d 462; 1984 U.S. LEXIS 146

Case history
- Prior: United States Jaycees v. McClure, 534 F. Supp. 766 (D. Minn. 1982); reversed, 709 F.2d 1560 (8th Cir. 1983); probable jurisdiction noted, 464 U.S. 1037 (1984).

Holding
- Minnesota's state antidiscrimination law prohibiting a private organization from excluding a person from membership based on sex is constitutional, because the state had a compelling interest in prohibiting discrimination which outweighed the First Amendment right of freedom of association.

Court membership
- Chief Justice Warren E. Burger Associate Justices William J. Brennan Jr. · Byron White; Thurgood Marshall · Harry Blackmun; Lewis F. Powell Jr. · William Rehnquist; John P. Stevens · Sandra Day O'Connor

Case opinions
- Majority: Brennan, joined by White, Marshall, Powell, Stevens; O'Connor (parts I and III)
- Concurrence: O'Connor
- Concurrence: Rehnquist (in judgment)
- Burger and Blackmun took no part in the consideration or decision of the case.

Laws applied
- U.S. Const. amends. I, XIV

Roberts v. United States Jaycees, 468 U.S. 609 (1984), was a decision of the Supreme Court of the United States overturning the United States Court of Appeals for the Eighth Circuit's application of a Minnesota antidiscrimination law. The case established what was at the time the prevailing framework for analyzing claims of associative freedom, holding that the Minneapolis branch of the United States Jaycees could not bar women from becoming voting members.

== Background ==
When the case was decided, regular membership in the United States Jaycees was available only to men aged 18 to 35. Women and older men could only join the group as associate members, who could not vote in the group or hold national offices, among other things. When Jaycee charters in Minnesota began admitting women, the national organization threatened to revoke their charter. The Minnesota charters responded by filing charges with the Minnesota Department of Human Rights, saying the Minnesota Human Rights Act required the local charters to accept women.

The state agency ruled that the Jaycees qualified as a "place of public accommodation" for the law's purposes, meaning they had to accept women and the national charter could not retaliate against the local charters for doing so. The Minnesota Supreme Court agreed, upholding the agency's decision. The Jaycees next took their claim to the United States District Court for the District of Minnesota, arguing that the Minnesota Supreme Court's interpretation of the phrase "place of public accommodation" was vague and overbroad. The District Court affirmed the Minnesota Supreme Court's decision.

The United States Court of Appeals for the Eighth Circuit reversed the District Court. The Eighth Circuit held that the Jaycees could select their members because the Jaycees advocated public causes, bringing their right to select their membership under the First Amendment's protection.

== Court's decision ==
=== Justice Brennan's majority opinion ===
Writing for the majority, Justice Brennan reversed the Eighth Circuit, concluding that the requirement that the Jaycees accept women as regular members did not unduly tread on male members' freedom of association. Justice Brennan first explained that there are two protected freedoms of association: freedom of intimate association, which is a component of the Fourteenth Amendment's guarantee of substantive due process, and freedom of expressive association, covered under the First Amendment.

The Court concluded that the Fourteenth Amendment's guarantee of intimate association does not apply to the Jaycees because they are not a sufficiently intimate group. The Court held that this guarantee – which protects, among other things, the right to marriage, childbirth, and cohabitation with one's relatives – does not extend to the Jaycees because local chapters of the Jaycees are "large and basically unselective groups."

The Court next held that the First Amendment's protection of expressive association does apply to the Jaycees, but concluded that this right is outweighed by Minnesota's compelling interest in preventing sex discrimination. The First Amendment generally protects the right to associate in an expressive context, because many individual First Amendment rights lose their meaning if they cannot be expressed by a group. However, Supreme Court precedent allows the government to curtail the freedom of expression when the restriction 1) serves compelling state interests, 2) does not relate to the suppression of ideas, and 3) cannot be achieved through means significantly less restrictive of associational freedoms. The statute, the Court held, serves compelling state interests because Minnesota sought to regulate access to the economy, and Minnesota could include in that regulatory effort the leadership services that organizations like the Jaycees provide. The Court concluded that the Minnesota Human Rights Act does not discriminate on the basis of viewpoint, either facially or as applied, meaning it does not relate to the suppression of ideas. The Court also found that the statute used the least restrictive means, as the Jaycees had failed to show that the Act burdens male members' freedom of association to a meaningful degree. The Jaycees argued, and the 8th Circuit agreed, that letting in women could change the group's political positions, but the Supreme Court rejected this claim, noting the lack of any evidence in the record that women would have different positions on issues than the men in the Jaycees. The Majority said that the Jaycees, or future parties, have to make a "substantial" showing that the admission of unwelcome members would change the group's message.

Finally, the Court ruled that the law was not vague or overbroad because Minnesota's Supreme Court concluded that the Act covers the Jaycees based on specific criteria like the organization's size, selectivity, commercial nature, and use of public facilities.

=== Justice O'Connor's partial concurrence ===
Justice O'Connor joined the Majority's opinion for Parts I (cataloguing the facts) and III (holding that the law is not vague or overbroad). Justice O'Connor also agreed that the Jaycees could not claim protection in the Fourteenth Amendment's guarantee of intimate association. Justice O'Connor took issue, however, with the Majority's test for when a group may permissibly exclude outsiders who it alleges will change the group's message. Justice O'Connor highlighted the perverse outcomes this rule has: If the Jaycees had historically opposed women's rights, or other causes seen as supported by women, it could exclude women more easily than a men's club that remained neutral on such topics.

Justice O'Connor also faulted the Majority for failing to determine whether the Jaycees were engaged in protected First Amendment expression, or commercial activity (which receives less protection). Justice O'Connor would consider association commercial only where the activities are not "predominantly of the type protected by the First Amendment." Applying that framework to the facts, Justice O'Connor concluded that the Jaycees were a commercial association, as they call their members "customers", and refer to memberships as goods that they sell. Justice O'Connor admitted that the Jaycees engaged in some protected activity, but said that was not enough to shield the Jaycees from regulation.

Justice Rehnquist concurred in the judgment without joining either opinion. Justices Burger and Blackmun took no part in deciding the case.

== Aftermath ==
Tommy Todd, President of the Jaycees, said the group was disappointed with the ruling but would comply, citing the Supreme Court's role in the American constitutional framework. Women's groups, who had challenged similar laws in states including New Jersey, New York and Connecticut, celebrated the authoritative quality of the Court's 7-0 ruling.

== Criticism ==
The decision has received criticism from both conservative and liberal legal academics. Conservative scholars, including John Inazu, have faulted the decision for unduly restricting the associational rights of groups who promote unpopular messages, or want to create a group that only admits certain types of people. Liberal scholars like Linda McClain have argued that those who praise the decision overestimate the effect that joining business groups like the Jaycees has on women's equality.

== See also ==
- Freedom of association
  - National Association for the Advancement of Colored People v. Alabama (1958)
  - Hurley v. Irish-American Gay, Lesbian, and Bisexual Group of Boston (1995)
  - Boy Scouts of America v. Dale (2000)
- Gender equality
- List of gender equality lawsuits
- List of United States Supreme Court cases, volume 468
