= Bilotti =

Bilotti is a surname. Notable people with the surname include:

- Anna Bilotti (born 1982), Italian politician
- Lorenzo Bilotti (born 1994), Italian bobsledder
- Thomas Bilotti (1940–1985), American mobster

== See also ==
- Belotti, a surname
- Billottia, a genus of plants; junior synonym of Calothamnus
