= United States v. Janis =

- Supreme Court of the United States

Argued December 8, 1975 Decided July 6, 1976
- Full case name: United States, et al. v. Janis
- Citations: 428 U.S. 433 (more) 96 S. Ct. 3021; 49 L. Ed. 2d 1046

Case history
- Prior: Judgment for plaintiff, 428 U.S. 437
- Subsequent: Decision reversed on ground of the Fourth Amendment and exclusionary rule, 428 U.S. 433

Holding
- The exclusionary rule does not apply to civil cases in which unconstitutionally seized evidence is used by a different sovereign than that which seized it.

Court membership
- Chief Justice Warren E. Burger Associate Justices William J. Brennan Jr. · Potter Stewart; Byron White · Thurgood Marshall; Harry Blackmun · Lewis F. Powell Jr. William Rehnquist · John P. Stevens

Case opinions
- Majority: Blackmun, joined by Burger, White, Powell, Rehnquist
- Dissent: Brennan, joined by Marshall
- Dissent: Stewart
- Stevens took no part in the consideration or decision of the case.

Laws applied
- U.S. Const. Amend. IV

United States v. Janis, 428 U.S. 433 (1976), was a Supreme Court Case that found Max Janis and Morris Levine guilty of illegal bookmaking activities in Los Angeles in a 5-3 ruling. The two were arrested for the crime in November 1968. Appealing on the grounds of unconstitutionally seized evidence, Janis and Levine were heard by the 9th Circuit Court of Appeals in 1973. The case was ultimately heard by the Supreme Court in 1975, and the two were found guilty in 1976. More importantly, the case established that the exclusionary rule does not apply to civil cases where evidence is unconstitutionally seized by a state officer but used by a federal institution.

== Background ==
In Los Angeles in 1968, Officer Leonard Weissman of the Los Angeles Police Department obtained a warrant authorizing the search for bookmaking paraphernalia in two apartments in the city. These apartments respectively belonged to Morris Levine and Max Janis. Officer Weissman had been conducting surveillance on the two men from September 14 through November 30 of 1968, during which time he suspected the two of illegal bookmaking.

Upon the search, the officer confiscated $4,940 in cash, bookmaking records, and arrested the two men. The bookmaking records seized were a five-day sample of the men's income from the business. He later contacted a revenue agent in the Internal Revenue Service (IRS) to analyze these records.

=== The Assessment ===
Because Janis and Levine never filed tax returns from the income received during the period they were under Weissman's surveillance, the IRS agent made an assessment congruent to 4401 of the Internal Revenue Code. The section indicates that any unauthorized wager (i.e. those accepted in illegal bookmaking) shall have a 2% excise tax placed on them. Thus, a two percent tax was placed on the estimated income of Levine and Janis. This income was derived from multiplying the average income from the aforementioned five-day sample by 77 – the number of days the two men were under Weissman's surveillance. When all computations were made, the IRS made an assessment of $89,026.09 against the two men.

Acting under 26 U.S.C. 6331, which gives the IRS the power to levy property from those who evade taxes, the original $4,940 was seized from Janis and Levine by the IRS as a part of the much larger assessment.

Upon being charged with violating gambling laws in Los Angeles Court, Levine and Janis appealed. They moved to suppress the warrant, or void it on the grounds that it was not constitutional. Ironically, the same judge that handed out the warrant was the one that heard the appeal for the warrant suppression. The Janis counsel held that Officer Weissman's affidavit was not convincing enough to warrant the search. They cited Spinelli v. United States, a case decided just before the issuing of the warrant that set precedent on how these warrants were to be approved.

=== The Faulty Warrant ===
Joining with Aguilar v. Texas, a case that established "hearsay" information was not enough to produce a warrant, a two-pronged test was established in 1969, known as the “Aguilar-Spinelli test”. The test required two crucial pieces of information: one being that the information supporting the necessity of the warrant is reliable and credible, and the other being that the circumstances of the surveillance must be made clear to the judge.

Janis and Levine appealed on the grounds that the former, in that the affidavit supporting the warrant was inadequate.

Both the District Court and the Ninth Circuit Court of Appeals held that the affidavit contained insufficient information and the evidence obtained by the warrant was therefore illegal. The government submitted a counterclaim to these rulings but it was quickly dismissed. Based on this, the Supreme Court granted certiorari.

=== Logic of the Supreme Court ===
The Court started by recognizing the central issue it faced. This issue was not question of illegally obtained evidence procured with a faulty warrant. The Court had already spoken several times on this issue and other issues related to the Fourth Amendment. Instead, the general question asks that if evidence seized by a state officer (Officer Weissman of the LAPD), but used by a federal department (the IRS) is admissible in a civil case - that being the one revolving around the tax assessment against Janis.

The Court states that there are two separate pieces to the entire case. The first of these is the "refund suit". Max Janis appealed his conviction and wanted a refund of the $4,940 taken from him. The second part of the case is a “tax collection suit”. This is the government's counterclaim to recollect the taxes, which was quickly shot down by the Ninth Circuit Court of Appeals.

The Court much discussed the “burden of proof”, or the need someone bears of proving themselves innocent. It was found that, since he was the original defendant, Janis carried this burden of proof. In his appeal, he needed to prove to the Court that the tax assessment made on him was incorrect. If this could not be done, Janis needed to provide what the correct assessment should have been. The Supreme Court felt he failed to prove his case. Logic would then take the side of the government and declare the tax assessment just. However, the true predicament of the case is that the government failed to prove their case either. The assessment made by the IRS was found to be “naked” because of the issue of the faulty warrant.

To determine which side was innocent and which was guilty, the Court first went through a lengthy history of the Fourth amendment. They established the fact that there is a solid argument for both sides; on one hand the lower courts ruled that the evidence had been illegally obtained, and thus the assessment this evidence yielded is not valid. On the other hand, the government makes a convincing case that the assessment was legal, even if the evidence was obtained with a faulty warrant. As the Court puts it, the officer that obtained the evidence and the agency that analyzed it (the IRS) are two separate “sovereigns”. The Court closely notes that Janis cited several instances where the exclusionary rule has been extended to civil cases, however all of these instances were “intrasovereign”, not “intersovereign”. Compton v. United States was cited, a case in which the Fourth Circuit Court determined that the fact that evidence is seized illegally by the police is irrelevant to a tax assessment made by the IRS. This case was strikingly similar to the one at hand and provided key case law for the decision.

== Opinions of the Court ==
=== Majority Opinion ===
The majority opinion was written by Justice Harry A. Blackmun. Chief Justice Warren E. Burger, along with Justices White, Powell, and Rehnquist joined in the majority opinion. The Supreme Court came to the conclusion that the use of this evidence seized unconstitutionally by a state officer does not “outweigh the societal costs imposed by the exclusion.” Therefore, they do not think it is fair to exclude the evidence from a federal institution, like the IRS. They believe this because it “falls outside the offending officer’s zone of primary interest.” In their concluding statement, the Court said “There comes a point at which courts, consistent with their duty to administer the law, cannot continue to create barriers to law enforcement in the pursuit of a supervisory role that is properly the duty of the Executive and Legislative Branches. We find ourselves at that point in this case.” In other words, they feel that extending the exclusionary rule to civil proceedings that include separate sovereigns is unfair in the name of justice. No concurring opinions were written for the case.

=== Dissenting Opinion ===
Both Justice Brennan and Justice Stewart wrote dissenting opinions. Justice Marshall joined Brennan's dissent, making the 3rd Justice to disagree with the ruling. The dissent of Justice Brennan and Marshall essentially argued that the exclusionary rule should be supreme since it is such a vital concept of the Fourth amendment. They felt the court continued to exhibit a “business of slow strangulation of the rule.”

Justice Stewart's dissent argued a similar point, just in a different way. He cited Elkins v. United States, in which the Supreme Court ditched the “silver platter doctrine”. This doctrine was an aspect of the exclusionary rule after it was created, but before the landmark case of Mapp v. Ohio, in which illegally seized evidence by a state officer could be used in a federal civil proceeding. Stewart's citation of Elkins made the point that an exception should not be made just because two different sovereigns are involved. Nonetheless, he was the only Justice that felt this way on the issue.
