= Berkemer v. McCarty =

- Supreme Court of the United States

Argued February 28, 1984 Decided July 2, 1984
- Full case name: Berkemer, Sheriff of Franklin County, Ohio v. McCarty
- Citations: 468 U.S. 420 (more) 104 S. Ct. 3138; 82 L. Ed. 2d 317

Case history
- Prior: Defendant convicted; conviction upheld by Supreme Court of Ohio due to lack of substantial appellate question. State v. McCarty, No. 81-710 (July 1, 1981); State habeas corpus petition denied, McCarty v. Herdman, No. C-2-81-1118 (Dec. 11, 1981); Federal habeas corpus petition granted, McCarty v. Herdman, 716 F.2d 361, 363 (1983)

Holding
- A person subjected to custodial interrogation is entitled to the benefit of the procedural safeguards enunciated in Miranda, regardless of the nature or severity of the offense of which he is suspected or for which he was arrested.

Court membership
- Chief Justice Warren E. Burger Associate Justices William J. Brennan Jr. · Byron White; Thurgood Marshall · Harry Blackmun; Lewis F. Powell Jr. · William Rehnquist; John P. Stevens · Sandra Day O'Connor

Case opinions
- Majority: Marshall, joined by Burger, Brennan, White, Blackmun, Powell, Rehnquist, O'Connor
- Concurrence: Stevens

Laws applied
- U.S. Const. amends. V, XIV
- Superseded by
- Hiibel v. Sixth Judicial District Court of Nevada (in part)

Berkemer v. McCarty, 468 U.S. 420 (1984), is a decision of the United States Supreme Court that ruled that a person in police custody following a misdemeanor traffic offense was entitled to the protections of the Fifth Amendment pursuant to the decision in Miranda v. Arizona 384 U.S. 436 (1966). Previously, some courts had been applying Miranda only to serious offenses.

== Background ==
An officer observed the defendant's car weaving in and out of its traffic lane. The officer stopped the defendant and asked him to exit his car. The officer noticed that the defendant was having difficulty standing, and the defendant's speech was slurred and difficult to understand. The defendant could not perform a "balancing test" without falling.

The officer asked the defendant whether he had consumed any intoxicants, and the defendant admitted having drunk two beers and smoked several marijuana joints shortly before being stopped. The officer arrested the defendant and took him to the county jail, where the defendant was subjected an intoxilyzer test. The test results were negative for the presence of alcohol.

The officer then resumed questioning the defendant. The defendant responded affirmatively when asked whether he had been drinking. When asked whether he was under the influence of alcohol, he said "I guess, barely." At no time was the defendant advised of his Miranda rights.

The trial court denied the defendant's motion to suppress his pre- and post-arrest statements. After exhausting his state appeals, the defendant filed a motion for writ of habeas corpus, but the federal district court denied the motion. The court of appeals reversed, holding that "Miranda warnings must be given to all individuals prior to custodial interrogation, whether the offense investigated is a felony or a misdemeanor traffic offense, and that respondent's post-arrest statements, at least, were inadmissible." The Supreme Court granted certiorari to consider two issues: whether the Miranda ruling applies to defendants charged with a misdemeanor and whether an investigative detention is equivalent to Miranda custodial interrogation.

== Opinion of the court ==
1. Miranda applies to custodial interrogations involving minor traffic offenses.
2. Routine questioning of motorists detained pursuant to traffic stops is not custodial interrogation under Miranda.

The Miranda rule prohibits the use of testimonial evidence in criminal proceedings that is the product of custodial police interrogation unless the police properly advise the defendant of his Fifth Amendment rights and the defendant knowingly, intelligently and voluntarily waives those rights and agrees to talk to the police. The circumstances triggering the Miranda safeguards are "custody" and "interrogation." Custody means formal arrest or the deprivation of freedom to an extent associated with formal arrest. Interrogation means explicit questioning or actions that are reasonably likely to elicit an incriminating response.

The defendant in the Berkemer case was interrogated twice: a pre-arrest roadside questioning and post-arrest interrogation at the jail. In neither case had the officer advised the defendant of his Miranda rights. During the post-arrest interrogation, the defendant was in custody as he had been arrested. The issue for the court was whether to create an exception to Miranda for custodial interrogations related to minor offenses.

The Supreme Court declined to create such an exception, because to do so would sacrifice the certainty and clarity of the Miranda rule. The pre-arrest interrogation raised the issue of whether detention was equivalent to custody for purposes of the Miranda rule. In its opinion, the court stated:

The roadside questioning of a motorist detained pursuant to a routine traffic stop does not constitute "custodial interrogation" for the purposes of the Miranda rule. Although an ordinary traffic stop curtails the "freedom of action" of the detained motorist and imposes some pressures on the detainee to answer questions, such pressures do not sufficiently impair the detainee's exercise of his privilege against self-incrimination to require that he be warned of his constitutional rights. A traffic stop is usually brief, and the motorist expects that, while he may be given a citation, in the end he most likely will be allowed to continue on his way... However, if a motorist who has been detained pursuant to a traffic stop thereafter is subjected to treatment that renders him "in custody" for practical purposes, he is entitled to the full panoply of protections prescribed by Miranda.

The court found that there were two significant differences between an interrogation of a person taken into custody and that of detainees. The first was the length of the detention; investigative detentions were brief and usually culminated in the issuance of a citation and release of the defendant. Second, the circumstances attendant to roadside detention were substantially less coercive and compulsive than those typically surrounding custodial interrogation. The court noted that, during most traffic stops, the actions of the officer are "exposed" to public view and that stops typically involve only one or two officers. The Berkemer ruling held that:

- A police officer can stop a vehicle if he has a reasonable articulable reason to suspect that "criminal activity is occurring."

- The officer may detain a person for sufficient time to conduct a reasonable investigation that either confirms or dispels his suspicions.

- The officer is not required to arrest the suspect once the officer has probable cause. The officer may delay the arrest for purposes of conducting a noncustodial interrogation.

- The officer may interrogate the suspect without advising him of his Miranda rights.
