= Regan v. Taxation with Representation of Washington =

Regan v. Taxation with Representation
- Supreme Court of the United States

Argued March 22, 1983 Decided May 23, 1983
- Full case name: Donald T. Regan v. Taxation with Representation of Washington
- Citations: 461 U.S. 540 (more) 103 S. Ct. 1997; 76 L. Ed. 2d 129; 1983 U.S. LEXIS 33; 51 U.S.L.W. 4583; 83-1 U.S. Tax Cas. (CCH) ¶ 9365; 51 A.F.T.R.2d (RIA) 1294

Case history
- Prior: 676 F.2d 715 (D.C. Cir. 1982); probable jurisdiction noted, 459 U.S. 819 (1982).

Holding
- Section 501(c)(3) of the Internal Revenue Code does not violate the First or Fifth Amendments.

Court membership
- Chief Justice Warren E. Burger Associate Justices William J. Brennan Jr. · Byron White; Thurgood Marshall · Harry Blackmun; Lewis F. Powell Jr. · William Rehnquist; John P. Stevens · Sandra Day O'Connor

Case opinions
- Majority: Rehnquist, joined by unanimous
- Concurrence: Blackmun, joined by Brennan, Marshall

Laws applied
- U.S. Const. amends. I, V

Regan v. Taxation with Representation of Washington, 461 U.S. 540 (1983), was a case in which the United States Supreme Court upheld lobbying restrictions imposed on tax-exempt non-profit corporations.

== Background ==
=== Internal Revenue Code ===
The case involved several provisions of the Internal Revenue Code of 1954:

- Section 501(c)(3) grants tax exemption to certain nonprofit organizations "no substantial part of the activities of which is carrying on propaganda, or otherwise attempting to influence legislation."
- Section 170(c)(2) permits taxpayers who contribute to § 501(c)(3) organizations to deduct the amount of their contributions on their federal income tax returns.
- Section 501(c)(4) grants tax-exempt status to certain nonprofit organizations but contributions to these organizations are not deductible. 26 U.S.C. § 501(c)(4) organizations, but not § 501(c)(3) organizations, are permitted to engage in substantial lobbying to advance their exempt purposes. 26 U.S.C. § 501(c)(4) grants exemption to civic leagues or organizations not organized for profit but operated exclusively for the promotion of social welfare, and the net earnings of which are devoted exclusively to charitable, educational, or recreational purposes.

=== Facts ===
Taxation with Representation of Washington (TWR), a non-profit corporation organized to promote certain interests in the field of federal taxation, was formed to take over the operation of two other nonprofit organizations, one of which had tax-exempt status under § 501(c)(3) and the other under § 501(c)(4), applied for tax-exempt status under § 501(c)(3). The Internal Revenue Service denied the application under § 501(c)(3), because it appeared that a substantial part of the corporation's activities would consist of attempting to influence legislation, which is not permitted by § 501(c)(3).

=== Procedural history ===
TWR brought their initial challenge before the United States District Court for the District of Columbia against the Commissioner of Internal Revenue, the Secretary of the Treasury, and the United States. TWR challenged the prohibition against substantial lobbying as violative of the First Amendment and the equal protection component of the Fifth Amendment's due process clause, and sought declaratory judgment that it qualified for the exemption granted by § 501(c)(3), claiming that § 501(c)(3)'s prohibition against substantial lobbying is unconstitutional under the First Amendment by imposing an "unconstitutional burden" on the receipt of tax-deductible contributions, and is also unconstitutional under the equal protection component of the Fifth Amendment's Due Process Clause because the Code permits taxpayers to deduct contributions to veterans' organizations that qualify for tax exemption under § 501(c)(19).

The District Court granted summary judgment against TWR. On appeal, the en banc United States Court of Appeals for the District of Columbia Circuit reversed, holding that while § 501(c)(3) did not violate the First Amendment, it did violate the Fifth Amendment's due process guarantees. The Commissioner of Internal Revenue, the Secretary of the Treasury and the United States, challenged the decision of the D.C. Circuit.

== Opinion of the Court ==
On appeal, the United States Supreme Court reversed. In an opinion by Justice William Rehnquist, a unanimous Court held:

(1) Congress was not required to provide appellant with public money with which it was to lobby; the prohibition against lobbying in § 501(c)(3) did not violate the First Amendment, since Congress, pursuant to § 501(c)(3), had not infringed on any First Amendment rights or regulated any First Amendment activity, and
(2) the prohibition against lobbying in § 501(c)(3) did not violate the equal protection component of the Fifth Amendment, even though veteran's organizations were allowed under § 501(c)(19) to carry on substantial lobbying and still qualify to receive tax deductible contributions, since qualified veteran's organizations were entitled to receive tax deductible contributions regardless of the content of the speech they used, and it was not irrational for Congress to decide that taxpayers should not subsidize the lobbying of tax exempt charities, or to decide that although it would not subsidize substantial lobbying by charities in general, it would subsidize the lobbying of veterans' organizations. The Court concluded that § 501(c)(3) did not employ any suspect classification, and the lower appellate court erred in applying strict scrutiny to it. The Court concluded that Congress could have granted funds to an organization, but conditioned the grant by providing that none of the money received from congress be used to lobby state legislatures.

=== Concurrence ===
Justice Harry Blackmun, joined by Justices William J. Brennan Jr. and Thurgood Marshall, concurred. While he joined the Court's opinion, the holding that § 501(c)(3) did not violate the First Amendment depended entirely on the Court's necessary assumption that the Internal Revenue Service, in enforcing the lobbying restrictions, required an organization qualified under § 501(c)(3), and its lobbying affiliate with tax exempt status under § 501(c)(4), only to be separately incorporated and to keep records adequate to show that the tax deductible contributions were not used to pay for lobbying.

== See also ==
- List of United States Supreme Court cases, volume 461
