= Bacchus Imports, Ltd. v. Dias =

- Supreme Court of the United States

Decided June 29, 1984
- Full case name: Bacchus Imports, Ltd. v. Dias
- Citations: 468 U.S. 263 (more)

Holding
- A tax on a class of goods with the purpose or effect of protecting or encouraging local business violates the Dormant Commerce Clause.

Court membership
- Chief Justice Warren E. Burger Associate Justices William J. Brennan Jr. · Byron White; Thurgood Marshall · Harry Blackmun; Lewis F. Powell Jr. · William Rehnquist; John P. Stevens · Sandra Day O'Connor

Case opinions
- Majority: White, joined by Burger, Marshall, Blackmun, Powell
- Dissent: Stevens, joined by Rehnquist, O'Connor
- Brennan took no part in the consideration or decision of the case.

Laws applied
- Dormant Commerce Clause

Bacchus Imports, Ltd. v. Dias, 468 U.S. 263 (1984), was a United States Supreme Court case in which the court held that a tax on a class of goods with the purpose or effect of protecting or encouraging local business violates the Dormant Commerce Clause. The Commerce Clause forbids pure economic protectionism of resident market participants. This case was an example of the third part of the test from Complete Auto Transit, Inc. v. Brady.

== Background ==
Hawaii imposed a 20% excise tax on sales of liquor at wholesale. However, to encourage the development of the Hawaiian liquor industry, ʻōkolehao, a brandy distilled from the root of an indigenous shrub of Hawaii, and fruit wine manufactured in Hawaii were exempted from the tax. Liquor wholesalers, who sell to retailers at the wholesale price plus the tax, brought an action in the Hawaii Tax Appeal Court seeking a refund of taxes paid under protest and alleging that the tax was unconstitutional because it violated, among other things, the Commerce Clause. The court rejected this constitutional claim, and the Hawaii Supreme Court affirmed, holding that the tax did not illegally discriminate against interstate commerce because the incidence of the tax is on the wholesalers, and the ultimate burden is borne by consumers in Hawaii.

== Opinion of the court ==
The Supreme Court issued an opinion on June 29, 1984.
