= Block v. Rutherford =

- Supreme Court of the United States

Argued March 28, 1984 Decided July 3, 1984
- Full case name: Block v. Rutherford
- Docket no.: 83-317
- Citations: 468 U.S. 576 (more)
- Argument: Oral argument

Holding
- Pretrial detainees do not have a constitutional right to contact visits and observation of shakedown searches.

Court membership
- Chief Justice Warren E. Burger Associate Justices William J. Brennan Jr. · Byron White; Thurgood Marshall · Harry Blackmun; Lewis F. Powell Jr. · William Rehnquist; John P. Stevens · Sandra Day O'Connor

Case opinions
- Majority: Burger, joined by White, Powell, Rehnquist, O'Connor
- Concurrence: Blackmun
- Dissent: Marshall, joined by Stevens, Brennan

Block v. Rutherford, 468 U.S. 576 (1984), was a United States Supreme Court case in which the court held that a ban on contact visits for pretrial detainees is not unconstitutional. A contact visit is one without a barrier between the detainee and their guest. Subsequent state courts interpreting state law have held that contact visits are rights.

== Background ==
In downtown L.A., Los Angeles County Central Jail acted as the primary facility in the county for male detainees awaiting trial. Detainees were held anywhere from days to weeks before their trials.

On February 9, 1975, pretrial detainees represented by the American Civil Liberties Union of Southern California filed a class action lawsuit against the L.A. county sheriff and other jail officials in federal district court, challenging the conditions of the jail. Examples of complaints included inadequate cell space, as plaintiffs were granted about 25 square feet per inmate while the minimum prescribed by California law was 40 square feet and state custom generally allotted 50 square feet per inmate. Inmates also complained of sleeping on "overflow" mattresses on jail floors and inadequate laundry, with some inmates wearing the same clothes for over a month and others resorting to washing their clothing in toilets and showers. After a 17-day trial, the district court judge William P. Gray granted the detainees injunctive relief and ordered the jail to make 12 changes in the living conditions, including telephone access, unaccompanied visits from minor children, daily outdoor recreation, regular laundry, and 15-min minimum for mealtimes. In particular, the district court granted detainees the right to witness "shakedowns" or searches of their cells, transparent windows, and contact visits from their families, stating, "[T]he ability of a man to embrace his wife and his children...during the weeks or months while he is awaiting trial is of great importance to him." Jail officials appealed the district court's decision of those three changes.

The United States Court of Appeals for the Ninth Circuit affirmed two of the conditions but reversed the order requiring transparent windows.

== Supreme Court ==
Jail officials petitioned for a writ of certiorari, which was granted on November 7, 1983. The Supreme Court reversed, finding that neither of the jail's remaining practices violated the detainee's rights of due process under the Fourteenth Amendment.
