= Obligation of identification =

Legal requirement to prove identity

Obligation of identification describes the requirement to be in possession of a valid identity card or other documentation, and to produce this on demand when requested by authorities.

Many countries have an obligation of identification for their own citizens within their borders, such as many European countries.

When a person is entering or exiting a country or state, an obligation of identification is often required, e.g., passport control.

== Overview ==
Many countries in Europe and several states in the US do require identification:

- Europe: Overview of national ID cards in Europe
- United States: Stop and identify statutes

== Identification obligation policies by country ==
=== Germany ===
==== Historical ====
The obligation of identification in Germany was introduced in 1938 by the Nazis for Jews and men of military age. Shortly after the start of World War II, it was extended to apply to all citizens over the age of 15. The identity card was known as Kennkarte.

British citizens were obliged to carry identity cards between October 1939 and May 1943. The British identity card did not have a photo of the individual or date of birth, just the name and address.

==== Present day ====
The German Act on Identity Cards and Electronic Identification (German: Personalausweisgesetz) requires all citizens over the age of 16 to be in possession of an identity card or passport and to be able to present this document to authorities on request, allowing for fines of up to €5000 in cases of violations. Except for specific circumstances, the act however does not demand carrying such a document at all times; in cases of suspicion of a crime and/or severe doubts as to the identity, police officials may temporarily apprehend persons or accompany them to their homes to produce the document there. The German identity card has a chip which stores an image of the holder's face and may also store fingerprints for holders from the age of 6. Driver's licenses, health insurance cards and other documents issued by government-controlled authorities are not valid means of identification for German citizens.

=== Sweden ===
In Sweden, there is no explicit law on obligation of identification. But still the police can demand identification in case of crime suspicion, because they have the duty to determine the identity of suspects. A person who is suspect of a crime giving a fine or an extra fee, such as no local traffic ticket, and are without an identity card, are suspect of identity fraud, a crime that can give prison and warrants an arrest. Normally those are brought to the police station and are asked for their name and personal ID number and are checked against the photo stored in the passport or driver's license database. A fine is not given if the identity is given correctly. Driver's licenses are valid as identification card in Sweden. Car drivers still have mandatory duty to carry their licenses, even if there is no crime suspicion.

The situation is similar in the other Nordic countries. Identity documents from Nordic countries are valid in all these countries, although some types are less known and can give problems. In Finland and Norway, citizens do have to identify to police even without suspicion of crime, just for police to be handling a mission.

=== Turkey ===
In Turkey, individuals above 15 years of age are legally required to present identification when stopped by law enforcement officers, and failure to do so may result in legal repercussions, and the public prosecutor must be notified. Should the individual continue to insist on not providing their identification, they may face arrest.

=== Hong Kong SAR ===
Section 17C of the Immigration Ordinance requires individuals above 15 years of age to carry proof of their identity at all times, and to produce it on demand for inspection by police officers, immigration officers, and immigration assistants. Proof of identity includes, among other things, a valid identity card or travel document. Failure to carry or produce proof of identity is an arrestable offence punishable by a fine.

== See also ==
- List of national identity card policies by country
- National identity cards in the European Economic Area § Overview of national identity cards
- Stop and identify statutes
