= United States v. $8,850 =

- Supreme Court of the United States

Argued January 28, 1983 Decided May 23, 1983
- Full case name: United States v. Eight Thousand Eight Hundred and Fifty Dollars ($8,850) in United States Currency
- Docket no.: 81-1062
- Citations: 461 U.S. 555 (more)
- Argument: Oral argument

Case history
- Prior: U.S. v. 8,850 Dollars, 645 F.2d 836 (9th Cir. 1981).

Holding
- On the facts, the Government's 18-month delay in filing a civil proceeding for forfeiture of the currency did not violate the claimant's right to due process of law.

Court membership
- Chief Justice Warren E. Burger Associate Justices William J. Brennan Jr. · Byron White; Thurgood Marshall · Harry Blackmun; Lewis F. Powell Jr. · William Rehnquist; John P. Stevens · Sandra Day O'Connor

Case opinions
- Majority: O'Connor, joined by Burger, Brennan, White, Marshall, Blackmun, Powell, Rehnquist
- Dissent: Stevens

Laws applied
- U.S. Const. amend. V

United States v. $8,850, 461 U.S. 555, is a United States Supreme Court case regarding civil forfeiture and the Due Process Clause of the Fifth Amendment.

== Background ==
On September 10, 1975, Mary Josephine Vasquez and a travel companion landed at Los Angeles International Airport after a short trip to Canada. While going through customs, Vasquez declared that she was not carrying more than $5,000 in currency. However, a customs inspector discovered and seized $8,850 in United States Currency from Vasquez. On September 18, Vasquez was notified by the United States Customs Service that her currency was subject to forfeiture. A week later, Vasquez petitioned for remission or mitigation, claiming that the violation was unintentional.

On October 20, 1975, Special Agent Janet Pompeo was assigned to investigate Vasquez's petition, and interviewed the customs agents who seized Vasquez's money at the airport. By mid-November, Pompeo had made several unsuccessful attempts to contact Vasquez's attorney to arrange an interview. When Pompeo made contact, the attorney said that he was unable to meet at that time, and that he wished to be present during the interview. Around this time, Pompeo had opened a criminal investigation on suspicion that Vasquez was engaged in drug smuggling. Between November 1976 and April 1976, Pompeo contacted various state, federal, and Canadian law enforcement officers to determine whether the currency was part of a narcotics operation.

In January 1976, Vasquez's attorney contacted Pompeo seeking an update on the status of the investigation, and was informed that it was still ongoing. On March 2, 1976, Pompeo contacted Vasquez's attorney and arranged an interview, which took place three days later. On April 26, the attorney again contacted Pompeo seeking an update. By this time, Agent Pompeo had received final reports from the law enforcement agencies, and concluded that there was no evidence that the money was part of a narcotics operation.

== Lower court history ==
=== District Court ===
In May 1976, Agent Pompeo submitted a report to the United States Attorney, William D. Keler, recommending prosecution of Vasquez for the reporting violation. After re-interviewing the customs agents and submitting a second report, Keller submitted the case to a grand jury in the Central District of California. On June 15, 1976, the grand jury returned a two-count indictment. Count One charged Vasquez with knowingly and willfully making false statements to a United States Customs officer, in violation of 18 U.S.C. § 1001, a felony. Count Two charged Vasquez with knowingly and willfully transporting $8,850 into the United States without filing a report, in violation of 31 U.S.C. §§ 1058 and 1101, a misdemeanor. The indictment sought forfeiture of the $8,850 as part of the misdemeanor count.

In August 1976, Agent Pompeo requested that the disposition of Vasquez's petition be delayed until the currency was no longer needed as evidence in the criminal trial. On December 24, 1976, Vasquez was convicted on the felony count of making false statements, but acquitted on the misdemeanor count of importing money without filing a report. Shortly after the trial, Vasquez's attorney inquired about whether there would be any delay in acting on the petition.

On March 10, 1977, the Customs Service informed Vasquez that the forfeiture claim had been referred to the United States Attorney. Less than two weeks later, a complaint seeking forfeiture was filed under 31 U.S.C. § 1102 in the Central District of California. In response, Vasquez admitted to the factual allegations, but raised an affirmative defense that the government's delay in processing her petitions violated her right to due process. After a two-day bench trial in January 1978, the District Court found that, under the circumstances, the time that had elapsed was reasonable, and declared the currency forfeited.

=== Court of Appeals ===
Vasquez appealed to the United States Court of Appeals for the Ninth Circuit. Oral arguments were heard on April 2, 1980, before Circuit Judges Herbert Choy and Arthur Alarcón, and Senior District Judge Gus J. Solomon. On May 22, 1981, it ruled 2–1 in favor of Vasquez. The Court held that the 18-month delay in filing its forfeiture action was unjustified, since such seizures infringe upon property rights. The Court further held that when the necessary elements of the forfeiture were established at the time of the seizure, and when the claimant requests a speedy disposition of the claim, pending administrative or criminal proceedings cannot justify the delay. The Court ordered the dismissal of the government's forfeiture action. The Court's decision created a conflict with decisions in other circuits, where panels had held that pending administrative and criminal proceedings are relevant considerations in determining whether delays in forfeiture proceedings violate the Due Process Clause. The United States petitioned the Supreme Court to hear the case.

== Supreme Court ==
Oral arguments were heard on January 18, 1983. The case was argued, on behalf of the United States, by Deputy Solicitor General Andrew L. Frey, and, on behalf of Vasquez, by Victor Sherman. On May 23, 1983, the Court held 8–1 in favor of the United States, and reversed the judgment of the Ninth Circuit. Justice O'Connor wrote for the eight-justice majority. Justice Stevens dissented.

== Notes ==
1. Vasquez's felony conviction would later be reversed because court files were left in the jury deliberation room. United States v. Vasquez, 597 F.2d 192 (9th Cir. 1979).
2. Senior United States District Judge Gus Jerome Solomon for the District Court for the District of Oregon sat by designation.
