= Kolender v. Lawson =

- Supreme Court of the United States

Argued November 8, 1982 Decided May 2, 1983
- Full case name: Kolender, Chief of Police of San Diego, et al. v. Edward Lawson
- Citations: 461 U.S. 352 (more) 103 S. Ct. 1855; 75 L. Ed. 2d 903

Case history
- Prior: 658 F.2d 1362 (9th Cir. 1981)

Holding
- The statute, as drafted and as construed by the state court, is unconstitutionally vague on its face within the meaning of the Due Process Clause of the Fourteenth Amendment by failing to clarify what is contemplated by the requirement that a suspect provide a "credible and reliable" identification.

Court membership
- Chief Justice Warren E. Burger Associate Justices William J. Brennan Jr. · Byron White; Thurgood Marshall · Harry Blackmun; Lewis F. Powell Jr. · William Rehnquist; John P. Stevens · Sandra Day O'Connor

Case opinions
- Majority: O'Connor, joined by Burger, Brennan, Marshall, Blackmun, Powell, Stevens
- Concurrence: Brennan
- Dissent: White, joined by Rehnquist

Laws applied
- U.S. Const. amend. XIV

Kolender v. Lawson, 461 U.S. 352 (1983), is a United States Supreme Court case concerning the constitutionality of vague laws that allow police to demand that "loiterers" and "wanderers" provide "credible and reliable" identification.

== Background ==
Edward Lawson was a law-abiding black man with suitable knowledge of the U.S. Constitution. Lawson was frequently subjected to police questioning and harassment in San Diego County, California, where he lived when as a pedestrian he walked in so-called "white neighborhoods". He was detained or arrested approximately 15 times by the San Diego Police within 18 months, was prosecuted twice, and was convicted once (the second charge was dismissed).

Lawson challenged California Penal Code § 647(e), which required persons who loiter or wander on the streets to identify themselves and account for their presence when requested by a peace officer to do so. A California appellate court, in People v. Solomon (1973), 33 Cal. App.3d 429, had construed the law to require "credible and reliable" identification that carries a "reasonable assurance" of its authenticity.

William Kolender was an appellant who was acting in his capacity as Chief of Police of San Diego, as was John Duffy who was acting in his capacity as Sheriff of San Diego County.

=== Prior history ===
The Ninth Circuit, in Lawson v. Kolender (1981), had additionally held that Penal Code §647(e) violated the Fourth Amendment’s prohibition of unreasonable searches and seizures because it "subverts the probable cause requirement" by authorizing arrest for conduct that is no more than suspicious. "Vagrancy statutes cannot turn otherwise innocent conduct into a crime".

The Ninth Circuit also noted that "police knowledge of the identity of an individual they have deemed 'suspicious' grants the police unfettered discretion to initiate or continue the investigation of the person long after the detention has ended. Information concerning the stop, the arrest and the individual's identity may become part of a large scale data bank."

Lawson represented himself up through the conclusion of the Federal Ninth Circuit Court appeal. He was told he could not represent himself before the Supreme Court without a law degree, so he had an ACLU lawyer represent him before the Court.

== Conclusion ==
Using the construction of the California appellate court in Solomon, the Court held that the law was unconstitutionally vague because it gave excessive discretion to the police (in the absence of probable cause to arrest) whether to stop and interrogate a suspect or leave him alone. The Court hinted that the California statute compromised the constitutional right to freedom of movement. (Note: The Court upheld the circuit court holdings: A person can not be required to furnish identification if not reasonably suspected of any criminal conduct.; A reasonable suspicion of criminal activity alone is insufficient to justify a patdown search; The person stopped is not obliged to answer, answers may not be compelled, and refusal to answer furnishes no basis for an arrest.; Vagrancy ordinances cannot turn otherwise innocent conduct into a crime.; Personal liberty, which is guaranteed to every citizen under U.S. Constitution and laws, consists of the right of locomotion, to go where one pleases, and when, and to do that which may lead to one's business or pleasure, only so far restrained as the rights of others may make it necessary for the welfare of all other citizens. One may travel along the public highways or in public places; and while conducting themselves in a decent and orderly manner, disturbing no other, and interfering with the rights of no other citizens, there, they will be protected under the law, not only their persons, but in their safe conduct. Any law that would place the keeping and safe conduct of another in the hands of even a conservator of the peace, unless for some breach of the peace committed in his presence, or upon suspicion of felony, would be most oppressive and unjust, and destroy all the rights, which the Constitution guarantees.; An innocent person cannot generally know when a police officer has reasonable cause to believe that his behavior warrants further investigation for criminal activity, and therefore cannot know when refusal to identify himself will be a crime.; No one may be required under peril of life, liberty or property to speculate as to the meaning of penal statutes.; Police knowledge of the identity of an individual they have deemed "suspicious" grants the police unfettered discretion to initiate or continue investigation of the person long after the detention has ended. Information concerning the stop, the arrest and the individual's identity may become part of a large scale data bank. The serious intrusion on personal security outweighs the mere possibility that identification may provide a link leading to arrest.) (Note: The Court's own holdings: While police have the right to request citizens to answer voluntarily questions concerning unsolved crimes they have no right to compel them to answer.; Fourth Amendment concerns are implicated where a state statute permits investigative detentions in situations where the police officers lack a reasonable suspicion of criminal activity based on objective facts.; The concern with curbing criminal activity cannot justify legislation that would otherwise fail to meet constitutional standards for definiteness and clarity.; A state criminal statute that requires persons who loiter or wander on the streets to provide a credible and reliable identification and to account for their presence when requested by a peace officer under circumstances that would justify a valid stop is unconstitutionally vague on its face within the meaning of the due process clause of the Fourteenth Amendment because it encourages arbitrary enforcement by failing to clarify what is contemplated by the requirement that a suspect provide a credible and reliable identification.; Statutory limitations on individual freedoms guaranteed by the U.S. Constitution are examined for substantive authority and content as well as for definiteness or certainty of expression. The void-for-vagueness doctrine requires that a penal statute define the criminal offense with sufficient definiteness that ordinary people can understand what conduct is prohibited and in a manner that does not encourage arbitrary and discriminatory enforcement.; In providing that a detention under a state statute may occur only where there is the level of suspicion sufficient to justify a constitutional stop, a state insures the existence of neutral limitations on the conduct of individual officers.)

Because the U.S. Supreme Court was able to resolve Kolender on the issue of vagueness, they did not decide the Fourth Amendment issue.

== Subsequent history ==
Kolender was cited in Hiibel v. Sixth Judicial District Court of Nevada, 542 U.S. 177 (2004), as an example of a "stop and identify" statute the Court had voided on vagueness grounds. In Hiibel, the Court held that a Nevada law requiring persons detained upon reasonable suspicion of involvement in a crime to state their name to a peace officer did not violate the Fourth Amendment's prohibition of unreasonable searches and seizures. Unlike California Penal Code §647(e) as construed in Solomon, the Nevada statute was apparently interpreted by the Nevada Supreme Court as requiring only that persons detained upon involvement in a crime to state their name.

Hiibel does not provide a means of arresting someone for failing or refusing to identify himself.

California Penal Code §647(e) was repealed in 2008 at the request of the Los Angeles County Sheriff's Department.

== See also ==
- List of United States Supreme Court cases, volume 461
- Papachristou v. Jacksonville, 405 U.S. 156 (1972)
- Stop-and-frisk in New York City
- Vagueness doctrine
