= Bellotti v. Baird (1976) =

- Supreme Court of the United States

Argued March 23, 1976 Decided July 1, 1976
- Full case name: Bellotti, Attorney General of Massachusetts, et al. v. Baird, et al.
- Citations: 428 U.S. 132 (more) 96 S. Ct. 2857; 49 L. Ed. 2d 844; 1976 U.S. LEXIS 81

Case history
- Prior: Baird v. Bellotti, 393 F. Supp. 847 (D. Mass. 1975); probable jurisdiction noted, 423 U.S. 982 (1975).
- Subsequent: On remand, Baird v. Bellotti, 428 F. Supp. 854 (D. Mass. 1977); 450 F. Supp. 997 (D. Mass. 1978); probable jurisdiction noted, 439 U.S. 925 (1978); affirmed, Bellotti v. Baird, 443 U.S. 622 (1979).

Holding
- Massachusetts law requiring parental consent was constitutional.

Court membership
- Chief Justice Warren E. Burger Associate Justices William J. Brennan Jr. · Potter Stewart; Byron White · Thurgood Marshall; Harry Blackmun · Lewis F. Powell Jr. William Rehnquist · John P. Stevens

Case opinion
- Majority: Blackmun, joined by unanimous

Bellotti v. Baird, 428 U.S. 132 (1976), was a United States Supreme Court case in which the Court upheld a Massachusetts law requiring parental consent to a minor's abortion, under the provision that "if one or both of the [minor]'s parents refuse... consent, consent may be obtained by order of a judge... for good cause shown." The decision was unanimous, and the opinion of the Court was written by Harry Blackmun. The law in question "permits a minor capable of giving informed consent to obtain a court order allowing abortion without parental consultation, and further permits even a minor incapable of giving informed consent to obtain an abortion order without parental consultation where it is shown that abortion would be in her best interests."

The case was initially titled as Baird v. Quinn (Baird et al. v. Quinn et al.) since at the time proceedings commenced, Robert H. Quinn was the attorney general of Massachusetts. He was replaced in 1975 by Francis X. Bellotti.

== See also ==
- Bellotti v. Baird
