= Hutchinson v. Proxmire =

- Supreme Court of the United States

Argued April 17, 1979 Decided June 26, 1979
- Full case name: Ronald R. Hutchinson, Plaintiff-Appellant, v. William Proxmire and Morton Schwartz, Defendants-Appellees
- Citations: 443 U.S. 111 (more) 99 S. Ct. 2675; 61 L. Ed. 2d 411

Case history
- Prior: 431 F. Supp. 1311 (W.D. Wis. 1977); affirmed, 579 F.2d 1027 (7th Cir. 1978); cert. granted, 439 U.S. 1066 (1979).
- Subsequent: Remanded, 605 F.2d 560 (7th Cir. 1979)

Holding
- The Speech or Debate Clause does not protect transmittal of information by individual Members of Congress by press releases and newsletters.

Court membership
- Chief Justice Warren E. Burger Associate Justices William J. Brennan Jr. · Potter Stewart; Byron White · Thurgood Marshall; Harry Blackmun · Lewis F. Powell Jr. William Rehnquist · John P. Stevens

Case opinions
- Majority: Burger, joined by White, Marshall, Blackmun, Powell, Rehnquist, Stevens
- Concur/dissent: Stewart
- Dissent: Brennan

Hutchinson v. Proxmire, 443 U.S. 111 (1979), was a United States Supreme Court case in which the Court held that statements made by a Senator in newsletters and press releases were not protected by the Speech or Debate Clause.

== Background ==
In 1975, Senator William Proxmire created the "Golden Fleece Award" for governmental agencies that sponsored programs and research which Proxmire considered a waste of tax dollars. Proxmire awarded a Golden Fleece to federal agencies sponsoring the research of behavioral scientist Ronald R. Hutchinson. Proxmire discussed Hutchinson's work, which he called "nonsense", in detail on the Senate floor, in conferences with his staff, and in a newsletter sent to over 100,000 of his constituents. The newsletter, which did not use Hutchinson's name, reported that "[t]he NSF, the Space Agency, and the Office of Naval Research won the 'Golden Fleece' for spending jointly $500,000 to determine why monkeys clench their jaws." Hutchinson sued Proxmire for libel, claiming that Proxmire's statements were defamatory and that he had been damaged by these libelous statements.

Hutchinson filed a lawsuit against Proxmire in the United States District Court for the Western District of Wisconsin claiming $8 million in damages for defamation, malicious conduct or conduct with grossly negligent disregard for the truth, invasion of rights to privacy, and intentional infliction of emotional anguish. The district court considered the following questions:

- Whether a press release issued by the United States Senate Service Department containing similar content to a Senate floor speech made by Proxmire was privileged under the Speech or Debate Clause of the United States constitution.
- Whether statements made by Proxmire were libelous or defamatory.

The respondents moved for summary judgment. The district court held that the press release was privileged under the Speech or Debate Clause, writing the "press release, in a constitutional sense, was no different than would have been a television or radio broadcast of his speech from the Senate floor." On the question of defamation, the district court considered whether Hutchinson was a public figure:

Given Dr. Hutchinson's long involvement with publicly funded research, his active solicitation of federal and state grants, the local press coverage of his research, and the public interest in the expenditure of public funds on the precise activities in which he voluntarily participated, the court concludes that he is a public figure for the purpose of this suit. As he acknowledged in his deposition, "Certainly, any expenditure of public funds is a matter of public interest."

Finding that Hutchinson was a public figure, the court moved on to the question of whether Proxmire had acted with actual malice. Finding that there was no "genuine issue of material fact" the court granted the motion for summary judgment in favor of Proxmire.

United States Court of Appeals for the Seventh Circuit affirmed, holding that Proxmire's statements in the press release and newsletters were protected by the Speech or Debate Clause. Though they found that comments made on television and during telephone calls were not protected by that Clause, the Court held that they were still protected by the First Amendment because the petitioner was a "public figure" and had not made a sufficient showing of "actual malice."

== Opinion of the Court ==
Having granted certiorari the Supreme Court considered three questions:

- the scope of the Speech or Debate Clause
- the First Amendment claims
- the appropriateness of summary judgment, under constitutional and state law

The Supreme Court decided that statements made by Congressmen in press releases and newsletters are not protected by the Speech or Debate Clause. In the course of their analysis, they determined that, under the precedents of the court, a member of Congress may be held liable for republishing defamatory statements that were originally made during floor speeches. They also found that Hutchinson was not a public figure and that the "actual malice" standard established by New York Times Co. v. Sullivan for defamation claims brought by public figure did not apply to Hutchinson's case. Although Hutchinson did have access to the news media, the facts of the case do not indicate "that he was a public figure prior to the controversy" that resulted from the Golden Fleece award. The Court wrote:

His access, such as it was, came after the alleged libel, and was limited to responding to the announcement of the award. Those charged with alleged defamation cannot, by their own conduct, create their own defense by making the claimant a public figure. Nor is the concern about public expenditures sufficient to make petitioner a public figure, petitioner at no time having assumed any role of public prominence in the broad question of such concern

They reversed the lower court decision and remanded back to the appeals court for further proceedings.

== Subsequent proceedings ==
Following the Supreme Court ruling, the case returned to the district court on remand. Proxmire sought dismissal. "Proxmire and Hutchinson [each] won some legal points, but neither scored a knockout." As Proxmire put it, "The district court concluded that neither I nor my legislative assistant defamed Dr. Hutchinson. The court of appeals recently held that Dr. Hutchinson is entitled to reconsideration of this ruling. Dr. Hutchinson and I, however, have agreed that further litigation is unnecessary," instead agreeing to a settlement. Proxmire agreed to pay Hutchinson $10,000 out of his own pocket; the Senate covered Proxmire's $124,351 in legal bills. While stopping short of an apology or recantation, Proxmire took to the Senate floor on March 24, 1980, stating in part, "Some of my statements concerning Dr. Hutchinson's research may be subject to an interpretation different from the one I intended and I am happy to clarify them.”

Specifically, Proxmire made these clarifications:

- I stated that all of the public funding was given to Dr. Hutchinson of Kalamazoo State Hospital. While Dr. Hutchinson directed the research, the Federal funding went to the State of Michigan for this research. Dr. Hutchinson received his salary as an employee of the State.
- I stated that Dr. Hutchinson's projects were extremely similar and perhaps duplicative. I know of no evidence that Dr. Hutchinson ever received extra money for work that duplicated earlier work that had already been funded.
- In my press release, I stated that Dr. Hutchinson made a fortune from his monkeys. While the amount of Federal expenditure was large and provided support for Dr. Hutchinson's research for a number of years, the fact is that Dr. Hutchinson did not [make] a personal fortune.

Proxmire continued to issue the Golden Fleece Award until his retirement from the Senate in 1989.
