= List of United States Supreme Court cases, volume 428 =

This is a list of all the United States Supreme Court cases from volume 428 of the United States Reports:

Case name	Citation	Date decided
Usery v. Turner Elkhorn Mining Co.	428 U.S. 1	1976
Planned Parenthood of Central Missouri v. Danforth	428 U.S. 52	1976
Singleton v. Wulff	428 U.S. 106	1976
Bellotti v. Baird	428 U.S. 132	1976
Gregg v. Georgia	428 U.S. 153	1976
Proffitt v. Florida	428 U.S. 242	1976
Jurek v. Texas	428 U.S. 262	1976
Woodson v. North Carolina	428 U.S. 280	1976
Roberts v. Louisiana	428 U.S. 325	1976
South Dakota v. Opperman	428 U.S. 364	1976
Buffalo Forge Co. v. Steelworkers	428 U.S. 397	1976
United States v. Janis	428 U.S. 433	1976
Stone v. Powell	428 U.S. 465	1976
United States v. Martinez-Fuerte	428 U.S. 543	1976
Cantor v. Detroit Edison Co.	428 U.S. 579	1976
