= Lino Bortolo Belotti =

Italian bishop (1930–2018)

- Auxiliary Bishop
- Diocese: Bergamo

Orders
- Ordination: 12 June 1954 by Giuseppe Piazzi
- Rank: Prelate

Personal details
- Born: October 19, 1930 Comenduno
- Died: March 23, 2018 (aged 87)
- Denomination: Roman Catholic

Lino Bortolo Belotti (19 October 1930 – 23 March 2018) was an Italian Roman Catholic prelate, former auxiliary bishop of the Diocese of Bergamo.

== Biography ==
Born in Comenduno, a frazione of Albino, he was ordained priest by Bishop Giuseppe Piazzi on 12 June 1954. Following his ordination he joined the Comunità Missionaria del Paradiso (Paradise Missionary Community), and later he worked as pastor for the Italian workers in Switzerland. After his return to Bergamo, he was named by Pope John Paul II as Auxiliary Bishop of that city's diocese.

He was the president of the commission dedicated to immigrants of the Italian Bishops' Conference, and president of the foundation Migrantes. He was also a member of the Pontifical Council for the Pastoral Care of Migrants and Itinerants. On 22 January 2009 Pope Benedict XVI accepted his resignation from the post of Auxiliary Bishop.
