= Bellotti v. Baird (1979) =

- Supreme Court of the United States

Argued February 27, 1979 Decided July 2, 1979
- Full case name: Bellotti, Attorney General of Massachusetts, et al. v. Baird, et al.
- Citations: 443 U.S. 622 (more) 99 S. Ct. 3035; 61 L. Ed. 2d 797; 1979 U.S. LEXIS 17

Case history
- Prior: Bellotti v. Baird, 428 U.S. 132 (1976); on remand, Baird v. Bellotti, 428 F. Supp. 854 (D. Mass. 1977); 450 F. Supp. 997 (D. Mass. 1978); probable jurisdiction noted, 439 U.S. 925 (1978).
- Subsequent: Rehearing denied, 444 U.S. 887 (1979).

Holding
- States may require parental notification before a minor may obtain an abortion, but must provide an alternative procedure to parental approval.

Court membership
- Chief Justice Warren E. Burger Associate Justices William J. Brennan Jr. · Potter Stewart; Byron White · Thurgood Marshall; Harry Blackmun · Lewis F. Powell Jr. William Rehnquist · John P. Stevens

Case opinions
- Plurality: Powell, joined by Burger, Stewart, Rehnquist
- Concurrence: Rehnquist
- Concurrence: Stevens (in judgment only), joined by Brennan, Marshall, Blackmun
- Dissent: White

Laws applied
- U.S. Const. amend. XIV

Bellotti v. Baird, 443 U.S. 622 (1979), is a United States Supreme Court case that ruled 8-1 that teenagers do not have to secure parental consent to obtain an abortion.

The Court elaborated on its parental consent decision of 1976 (which was also titled Bellotti v. Baird). It implies that states may be able to require a pregnant, unmarried minor to obtain parental consent to an abortion if the state law provides an alternative procedure to parental approval, such as letting the minor seek a state judge's approval instead. The plurality opinion declined to extend the full right to minors to seek and obtain an abortion, which was granted to adult women in Roe v. Wade. The Court rejected the extension to minors by placing emphasis on the especially vulnerable nature of children, their "inability to make critical decisions in an informed and mature manner; and the importance of the parental role in child rearing." Ironically, the plurality opinion allows a judge to determine that a pregnant minor is unable to make critical decisions regarding a fetus and must instead become a parent—thereby forcing the minor to make critical decisions regarding another child.

Consent must be obtained from the parent(s) for a minor to have a nonemergency abortion and the parent(s) must know about the judicial proceedings, unless no parent(s) are available. If the judge decides the minor is mature and making an informed and capable decision, he can still deny the abortion based on his own decision.

Justice Lewis F. Powell Jr., joined by Chief Justice Warren E. Burger, Justice Potter Stewart, and Justice William Rehnquist argued there are three reasons why children aren't like adults: the vulnerability of children, the lack of critical decision making, and reliance on parents guidance for their children upbringing.

Justice John P. Stevens, joined by Justice William J. Brennan Jr., Justice Thurgood Marshall, and Justice Harry Blackmun, concluded that the Massachusetts statute was unconstitutional because first it allows for the court to deny the abortion despite the courts decision on the minor's maturity. Second, consent was required in every case without giving the minor an option to an independent case to prove she was mature, leading to an 'absolute third-party veto'.

If a state requires a pregnant minor to obtain consent of one or both parents, another alternative option must be available for the minor to receive the abortion. The alternative process has four requirements: (1) the minor is permitted to demonstrate her maturity and informed decision making on having the abortion without parental consent, (2) if the minor does not prove maturity, she has the ability to convince the judge that the abortion would be the best decision for her (3) the minor must remain anonymous, and (4) the process must be expedited to ensure the abortion will be possible to obtain.

Justice Rehnquist concurred on stare decisis grounds while continuing to oppose the constitutional right to an abortion.

== See also ==
- List of United States Supreme Court cases, volume 443
