= Terry v. Ohio =

U.S. Supreme Court case applying Fourth Amendment to "stop & frisk" by police

- Supreme Court of the United States

Argued December 12, 1967 Decided June 10, 1968
- Full case name: John W. Terry, et al. v. State of Ohio
- Citations: 392 U.S. 1 (more) 88 S. Ct. 1868; 20 L. Ed. 2d 889; 1968 U.S. LEXIS 1345; 44 Ohio Op. 2d 383
- Argument: Oral argument

Case history
- Prior: Defendant's motion to suppress evidence denied, 32 Ohio Op. 2d 489 (1964); defendant convicted, 95 Ohio L. Abs. 321 (Court of Common Pleas of Cuyahoga County 1964); affirmed, 214 N.E.2d 114 (Ohio Ct. App. 1966); review denied, Ohio Supreme Court, November 19, 1966; cert. granted, 387 U.S. 929 (1967).

Holding
- Police may stop a person if they have a reasonable suspicion that the person has committed or is about to commit a crime, and may frisk the suspect for weapons if they have reasonable suspicion that the suspect is armed and dangerous, without violating the Fourth Amendment prohibition on unreasonable searches and seizures. Supreme Court of Ohio affirmed.

Court membership
- Chief Justice Earl Warren Associate Justices Hugo Black · William O. Douglas; John M. Harlan II · William J. Brennan Jr. Potter Stewart · Byron White; Abe Fortas · Thurgood Marshall

Case opinions
- Majority: Warren, joined by Black, Harlan, Brennan, Stewart, White, Fortas, Marshall
- Concurrence: Harlan
- Concurrence: White
- Dissent: Douglas

Laws applied
- U.S. Const. amends. IV, XIV

Terry v. Ohio, 392 U.S. 1 (1968), is a landmark U.S. Supreme Court decision in which the court ruled that it is constitutional for American police to "stop and frisk" a person they reasonably suspect to be armed and involved in a crime. Specifically, the decision held that a police officer does not violate the Fourth Amendment to the U.S. Constitution's prohibition on unreasonable searches and seizures when questioning someone even though the officer lacks probable cause to arrest the person, so long as the police officer has a reasonable suspicion that the person has committed, is committing, or is about to commit a crime. The court also ruled that the police officer may perform a quick surface search of the person's outer clothing for weapons if they have reasonable suspicion that the person stopped is "armed and presently dangerous." This reasonable suspicion must be based on "specific and articulable facts," and not merely upon an officer's hunch.

This permitted police action has subsequently been referred to in short as a "stop and frisk", "stop, question, and frisk," or simply a "Terry stop." The Terry standard was later extended to temporary detentions of persons in vehicles, known as traffic stops; see Terry stop for a summary of subsequent jurisprudence. The rationale behind the Supreme Court decision revolves around the notion that, as the opinion argues, "the exclusionary rule has its limitations." According to the court, the meaning of the rule is to protect persons from unreasonable searches and seizures aimed at gathering evidence, not searches and seizures for other purposes (like prevention of crime or personal protection of police officers).

Legal scholars have criticized this ruling stating that "the people's constitutional right against the use of abusive police power" has been sacrificed in favor of a "police-purported need for a workable tool short of probable cause to use in temporary investigatory detentions." Critics also state that it has led to negative legislative outcomes and permitting instances of racial profiling.

== Background ==
=== Legal history ===
"Stop-and-frisk" is a practice in which a police officer stops a person suspected of involvement in a crime, briefly searches the person's clothing for weapons, and then questions the person, all without requiring the person's consent and without enough grounds to execute a lawful arrest. All major American police forces routinely employed the stop-and-frisk practice. It was historically viewed as a "low visibility" police procedure and was "largely ignored by commentators and dealt with ambiguously by most courts."

In the early 1960s, several major changes in American criminal law raised the issue's importance. In its 1961 decision Mapp v. Ohio, the U.S. Supreme Court ruled that the exclusionary rule—which prevents the government from using evidence in criminal prosecutions if it had been illegally obtained—applies to the U.S. states as well as to the federal government. In 1966, the Supreme Court ruled in Miranda v. Arizona that the Fifth Amendment requires courts to suppress confessions that law-enforcement personnel obtain without first providing certain specific legal warnings to an arrestee. Stop-and-frisk quickly became a popular topic for law-review articles. Several cases forced state supreme courts to address the practice more directly, such as the Supreme Court of California's 1963 decision in People v. Mickelson.

=== Case background ===
On October 31, 1963, police officer Martin McFadden was on duty in downtown Cleveland, Ohio when he noticed two men standing on a street corner. McFadden watched one of the men, John W. Terry, walk down the street, look through a store window, then walk a short distance further before turning around and returning to where he had started, stopping to peer in the store window again on his way back. The other man, Richard Chilton, then repeated Terry's movements. As McFadden watched, the pair repeated this routine many times. A third man then joined them and the three began walking down the street toward the store. McFadden suspected the men had been "casing" the store in preparation for robbing it, so he followed and confronted them. He asked their names, but they offered only noncommittal, mumbling answers. McFadden then grabbed Terry and Chilton and frisked them, discovering they both had pistols in their jacket pockets.

McFadden arrested Terry and Chilton for suspicion of carrying illegally concealed weapons. Both men were charged and tried in the Ohio Court of Common Pleas for Cuyahoga County. Terry's lawyer filed a motion to suppress the evidence of the discovered pistol, arguing McFadden's frisk had been a violation of Terry's Fourth Amendment rights and that the pistol should be excluded from evidence under the exclusionary rule. The trial judge denied his motion on the basis that the stop-and-frisk was generally presumed legal, and Terry was convicted. He appealed to the Ohio District Court of Appeals, which affirmed his conviction, and then to the Supreme Court of Ohio, which dismissed his appeal. He then appealed to the U.S. Supreme Court, which agreed to hear his case and granted certiorari.

== Supreme Court decision ==
On June 10, 1968, the U.S. Supreme Court issued an 8–1 decision against Terry that upheld the constitutionality of the "stop-and-frisk" procedure as long as the police officer has a "reasonable suspicion" that the person is about to commit a crime, has committed a crime or is in the process of committing a crime, and may be "armed and presently dangerous."

=== Opinion of the court ===
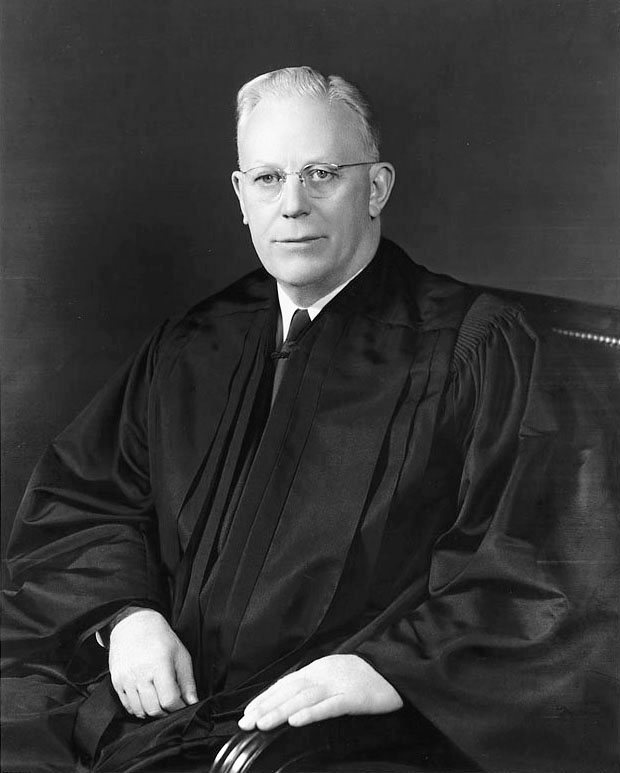
Chief Justice Earl Warren, the author of the majority opinion in Terry

Eight justices formed the majority and joined an opinion written by Chief Justice Earl Warren. The court began by accepting Terry's arguments, which Ohio had disputed, that policeman McFadden's stopping, questioning, and frisking of Terry and Chilton constituted actual searches and seizures under the Fourth Amendment. But the court ruled that the Fourth Amendment "searches" and "seizures" that occurred during a "stop-and-frisk" were not "unreasonable" under the Amendment's first clause. Both the initial "stop" and the subsequent "frisk" were so "limited" and "brief" that a lesser justification sufficed, rather than requiring the police to have probable cause beforehand.

If this case involved police conduct subject to the Warrant Clause of the Fourth Amendment, we would have to ascertain whether "probable cause" existed to justify the search and seizure which took place. However, that is not the case. We do not retreat from our holdings that the police must, whenever practicable, obtain advance judicial approval of searches and seizures through the warrant procedure, or that in most instances failure to comply with the warrant requirement can only be excused by exigent circumstances. But we deal here with an entire rubric of police conduct—necessarily swift action predicated upon the on-the-spot observations of the officer on the beat—which historically has not been, and as a practical matter could not be, subjected to the warrant procedure. Instead, the conduct involved in this case must be tested by the Fourth Amendment's general proscription against unreasonable searches and seizures.

— Terry, 392 U.S. at 20 (citations omitted).

Reasoning that police officers' need to protect themselves outweighed the limited intrusions involved, the court ruled that officers could "stop" a person if they had "reasonable suspicion" that criminal activity was afoot, and could then "frisk" the person who was stopped if they had "reasonable suspicion" that the person was "armed and presently dangerous." Neither intrusion required that police have the higher level of "probable cause" that would be needed to arrest or to conduct a full search. The court defined this new, lesser standard of "reasonable suspicion" as being less than "probable cause" but more than just a hunch, stating that "the police officer must be able to point to specific and articulable facts which, taken together with rational inferences from those facts, reasonably warrant [the] intrusion."

Our evaluation of the proper balance that has to be struck in this type of case leads us to conclude that there must be a narrowly drawn authority to permit a reasonable search for weapons for the protection of the police officer, where he has reason to believe that he is dealing with an armed and dangerous individual, regardless of whether he has probable cause to arrest the individual for a crime. The officer need not be absolutely certain that the individual is armed; the issue is whether a reasonably prudent man in the circumstances would be warranted in the belief that his safety or that of others was in danger. And in determining whether the officer acted reasonably in such circumstances, due weight must be given, not to his inchoate and unparticularized suspicion or "hunch," but to the specific reasonable inferences which he is entitled to draw from the facts in light of his experience.

— Terry, 392 U.S. at 27 (footnotes and citations omitted).

The court held that this "reasonable suspicion" standard must apply to both the initial stop and the frisk. It said that a police officer must have reasonable suspicion to stop a suspect in the first place and that an officer could then frisk a stopped suspect if he or she had reasonable suspicion that the suspect was armed and dangerous, or if, in the officer's experience, the suspected criminal activity was of a type that was "likely" to involve weapons. The sole purpose of the officer's frisk could only be to ensure the suspect was not armed, and so had to be limited to a pat-down of the suspect's outer clothing.

The court then applied these legal principles to McFadden's actions with Terry and found that they comported with the "reasonable suspicion" standard. McFadden had years of experience as a policeman and was able to articulate the observations that led him to suspect that Terry and the other men were preparing to rob the store. Since McFadden reasonably suspected that the men were preparing for armed robbery, he reasonably suspected that Terry was armed, and so his frisk of Terry's clothing was permissible and did not violate Terry's Fourth Amendment rights.

The court ended its opinion by framing the issue very narrowly, saying the question it was answering was "whether it is always unreasonable for a policeman to seize a person and subject him to a limited search for weapons unless there is probable cause for an arrest." In answer to this limited question, the court said it was not. It ruled that when a policeman observes "unusual conduct which leads him reasonably to conclude in light of his experience that criminal activity may be afoot and that the persons with whom he is dealing may be armed and presently dangerous," it is not a violation of the Fourth Amendment for the policeman to conduct a "stop-and-frisk" of the people whom he suspects.

=== Concurring opinion of Justice White ===
Justice Byron White joined the opinion of the court but suggested:

There is nothing in the Constitution which prevents a policeman from addressing questions to anyone on the streets. Absent special circumstances, the person approached may not be detained or frisked but may refuse to cooperate and go on his way. However, given the proper circumstances, such as those in this case, it seems to me the person may be briefly detained against his will while pertinent questions are directed to him. Of course, the person stopped is not obliged to answer, answers may not be compelled, and refusal to answer furnishes no basis for an arrest, although it may alert the officer to the need for continued observation.

With regard to the lack of obligation to respond when detained under circumstances of Terry, this opinion came to be regarded as persuasive authority in some jurisdictions, and the court cited these remarks in dicta in Berkemer v. McCarty, 468 U.S. 420 (1984), at 439. However, in Hiibel v. Sixth Judicial District Court of Nevada, 542 U.S. 177 (2004), the court held that neither of these remarks was controlling in a situation in which a state law required a detained person to identify himself.

=== Dissenting opinion of Justice Douglas ===
Justice William O. Douglas strongly disagreed with the permissibility of performing a stop-and-frisk action absent probable cause:

We hold today that the police have greater authority to make a 'seizure' and conduct a 'search' than a judge has to authorize such action. We have said precisely the opposite over and over again.

To give the police greater power than a magistrate is to take a long step down the totalitarian path. Perhaps such a step is desirable to cope with modern forms of lawlessness. But if it is taken, it should be the deliberate choice of the people through a constitutional amendment.

=== Later criticism ===
Lewis Katz criticized Terry in 1997 for inaccurately summarizing the facts of the case itself. He also criticized it for "fail[ing] to strike a meaningful Fourth Amendment balance between effective law enforcement and individual freedom."

== Subsequent jurisprudence ==
Terry set precedent for a wide assortment of Fourth Amendment cases. The cases range from street stop-and-frisks to traffic stops in which pat-down searches could be conducted on the driver or passengers. In Michigan v. Long, the Supreme Court ruled that car compartments could be constitutionally searched if an officer has reasonable suspicion that the suspect is armed and dangerous. The compartments are thus viewed as an extension of the suspect's person. This is known as "frisking the lunge area," as an officer may protect himself by searching any areas from which the suspect could grab a weapon.

The Terry doctrine was markedly extended in the 2004 case of Hiibel v. Sixth Judicial District Court of Nevada, 542 U.S. 177 (2004), in which the Supreme Court held that a state law requiring the suspect to identify himself during a Terry stop did not necessarily violate the Fourth Amendment prohibitions of unreasonable searches and seizures or the Fifth Amendment privilege against self-incrimination (although it potentially could violate the Fifth Amendment if the citizen reasonably believed that such identification could be used to incriminate him). To date, 24 states have passed such "stop and identify" laws.

The court most recently cited Terry v. Ohio in the 2009 case of Arizona v. Johnson, in which the court unanimously ruled to further expand Terry, granting police the ability to frisk an individual in a stopped vehicle if there is reasonable suspicion to believe the individual is armed and dangerous. This fulfills only the second prong of Terry (the first prong—reasonable suspicion that a crime has, is or will be committed—is fulfilled by the traffic violation that prompted the initial stop). According to Whren v. United States, any traffic violation, no matter how small, is a legitimate basis for a traffic stop.

In Heien v. North Carolina, an 8–1 decision in December 2014, the court expanded the "reasonable suspicion" factor of the Terry decision to cover a police officer's reasonable mistake of law that gives rise to "reasonable suspicion" that justifies a traffic stop under the Fourth Amendment.

== See also ==
- Fourth Amendment
- Terry stop
