= List of United States Supreme Court cases, volume 443 =

This is a list of all the United States Supreme Court cases from volume 443 of the United States Reports:

Case name	Citation	Date decided
Mackey v. Montrym	443 U.S. 1	1979
Michigan v. DeFillippo	443 U.S. 31	1979
Brown v. Texas	443 U.S. 47	1979
Barry v. Barchi	443 U.S. 55	1979
Califano v. Westcott	443 U.S. 76	1979
Smith v. Daily Mail Publ'g Co.	443 U.S. 97	1979
Hutchinson v. Proxmire	443 U.S. 111	1979
Baker v. McCollan	443 U.S. 137	1979
Wolston v. Reader's Digest Ass'n Inc.	443 U.S. 157	1979
Leroy v. Great W. United Corp.	443 U.S. 173	1979
Steelworkers v. Weber	443 U.S. 193	1979
Edmonds v. Compagnie Generale Transatlantique	443 U.S. 256	1979
Califano v. Boles	443 U.S. 282	1979
Jackson v. Virginia	443 U.S. 307	1979
Fed. Open Market Comm. v. Merrill	443 U.S. 340	1979
Gannett Co. v. DePasquale	443 U.S. 368	1979
Columbus Bd. of Ed. v. Penick	443 U.S. 449	1979
Dayton Bd. of Ed. v. Brinkman	443 U.S. 526	1979
Rose v. Mitchell	443 U.S. 545	1979
Jones v. Wolf	443 U.S. 595	1979
Bellotti v. Baird (1979)	443 U.S. 622	1979
Washington v. Wash. State Com. Passenger Fishing Vessel Ass'n	443 U.S. 658	1979
Morland v. Sprecher	443 U.S. 709	1979
Moore v. Duckworth	443 U.S. 713	1979
Pac. Tel. & Tel. Co. v. Pub. Util. Comm'n	443 U.S. 1301	1979
Lenhard v. Wolff	443 U.S. 1306	1979
