= List of United States Supreme Court cases, volume 468 =

This is a list of all United States Supreme Court cases from volume 468 of the United States Reports:

Case name	Citation	Date decided
Reed v. Ross	468 U.S. 1	1984
Thigpen v. Roberts	468 U.S. 27	1984
Burnett v. Grattan	468 U.S. 42	1984
United States v. Yermian	468 U.S. 63	1984
NCAA v. Univ. of Okla.	468 U.S. 85	1984
Sec. Indus. Ass'n v. FRS I	468 U.S. 137	1984
Davis v. Scherer	468 U.S. 183	1984
Sec. Indus. Ass'n v. FRS II	468 U.S. 207	1984
Regan v. Wald	468 U.S. 222	1984
Bacchus Imports, Ltd. v. Dias	468 U.S. 263	1984
Clark v. Cmty. for Creative Non-Violence	468 U.S. 288	1984
Richardson v. United States	468 U.S. 317	1984
Hobby v. United States	468 U.S. 339	1984
FCC v. League of Women Voters	468 U.S. 364	1984
Berkemer v. McCarty	468 U.S. 420	1984
Spaziano v. Florida	468 U.S. 447	1984
Brown v. Hotel Employees	468 U.S. 491	1984
Hudson v. Palmer	468 U.S. 517	1984
Wasman v. United States	468 U.S. 559	1984
Block v. Rutherford	468 U.S. 576	1984
Roberts v. U.S. Jaycees	468 U.S. 609	1984
Regan v. Time, Inc.	468 U.S. 641	1984
United States v. Karo	468 U.S. 705	1984
Allen v. Wright	468 U.S. 737	1984
Segura v. United States	468 U.S. 796	1984
Selective Service System v. Minn. Pub. Int. Rsch. Grp.	468 U.S. 841	1984
Irving Indep. Sch. Dist. v. Tatro	468 U.S. 883	1984
United States v. Leon	468 U.S. 897	1984
Massachusetts v. Sheppard	468 U.S. 981	1984
Smith v. Robinson	468 U.S. 992	1984
INS v. Lopez-Mendoza	468 U.S. 1032	1984
Payne v. Virginia	468 U.S. 1062	1984
