= List of United States Supreme Court cases, volume 461 =

United States Supreme Court cases from 1983

This is a list of all the United States Supreme Court cases from volume 461 of the United States Reports:

Case name	Citation	Date decided
Morris v. Slappy	461 U.S. 1	1983
Smith v. Wade	461 U.S. 30	1983
City of Los Angeles v. Lyons	461 U.S. 95	1983
Connick v. Myers	461 U.S. 138	1983
United States v. Grace	461 U.S. 171	1983
Pacific Gas & Electric Co. v. State Energy Resources Conservation and Development Comm'n	461 U.S. 190	1983
Alabama v. Evans	461 U.S. 230	1983
Olim v. Wakinekona	461 U.S. 238	1983
Jim McNeff, Inc. v. Todd	461 U.S. 260	1983
Block v. North Dakota ex rel. Board of Univ. and School Lands	461 U.S. 273	1983
Comm'r v. Tufts	461 U.S. 300	1983
Martinez v. Bynum	461 U.S. 321	1983
Kolender v. Lawson	461 U.S. 352	1983
Ark. Elec. Coop. Corp. v. Ark. Pub. Serv. Comm'n	461 U.S. 375	1983
Am. Paper Inst., Inc. v. Am. Elec. Power Serv. Corp.	461 U.S. 402	1983
Hensley v. Eckerhart	461 U.S. 424	1983
Heckler v. Campbell	461 U.S. 458	1983
Firefighters v. NAACP	461 U.S. 477	1983
Verlinden B.V. v. Cent. Bank	461 U.S. 480	1983
United States v. Hasting	461 U.S. 499	1983
Pallas Shipping Agency, Ltd. v. Duris	461 U.S. 529	1983
Regan v. Taxation with Representation of Washington	461 U.S. 540	1983
United States v. $8,850	461 U.S. 555	1983
Cardwell v. Taylor	461 U.S. 571	1983
Bob Jones Univ. v. United States	461 U.S. 574	1983
Morrison-Knudsen Constr. Co. v. Director	461 U.S. 624	1983
Gen. Motors Corp. v. Devex Corp.	461 U.S. 648	1983
Bearden v. Georgia	461 U.S. 660	1983
United States v. Rodgers	461 U.S. 677	1983
Bill Johnson's Restaurants, Inc. v. NLRB	461 U.S. 731	1983
W.R. Grace & Co. v. Rubber Workers	461 U.S. 757	1983
Bell v. New Jersey	461 U.S. 773	1983
Evans v. Alabama	461 U.S. 1301	1983
Volkswagenwerk A.G. v. Falzon	461 U.S. 1303	1983
