= House v. Napolitano =

2011 lawsuit

- Court: United States District Court for the District of Massachusetts
- Decided: March 28 2012

Holding
- Court denied Defendant's motion to dismiss on First Amendment and Fourth Amendment grounds.

Court membership
- Judge sitting: Denise J. Casper

House v. Napolitano (D. Mass., 2012) is a United States District Court for the District of Massachusetts case involving David House, a known supporter of Chelsea Manning and co-founder of the Manning Support Network, who brought action against Janet Napolitano, Secretary of the United States Department of Homeland Security (DHS), Alan Bersin, Commissioner of the U.S. Customs and Border Protection (CBP), and John T. Morton, Director of the U.S. Immigration and Customs Enforcement (ICE) (collectively referred to as "Defendants") for the search and seizure of his electronic devices by federal agents at the border. Defendants moved to dismiss, and the court denied the motion on First Amendment and Fourth Amendment grounds. House subsequently reached a settlement with the government in May 2013, to return or destroy all information obtained from the investigation.

== Background ==
On November 3, 2010, House arrived at Chicago's O'Hare International Airport after a vacation in Mexico. After a brief search at customs, House was approached by two government agents, who stopped him and seized his electronic devices, including his laptop, USB flash drive, video camera, and cellphone, which contained information identifying members and supporters of the Manning Support Network. House was then taken to an interrogation room and questioned about his political activities, and associations with the Manning Support Network and WikiLeaks. At the end of the interrogation, the agents returned House's cellphone, and stated that he would receive the rest within a week. The data from his electronic devices was then forwarded to the United States Army Criminal Investigation Command (CID), which did not go on to use the information.

When House did not receive his materials, he, with the help of the ACLU of Massachusetts, sent a letter to the DHS, CBP, and ICE, requesting that the devices be returned, with information regarding the chain of custody and any copying of his data. The DHS returned House's devices the following day, but without the requested information.

On May 13, 2011, House filed a lawsuit against the Defendants, on the basis that the search and seizure of his devices violated his Fourth Amendment rights, and the retention and dissemination of data from his computer relating to the Manning Support Network violated his First Amendment freedom of association.

== Arguments ==
=== Fourth Amendment Challenge to the Initial Search and Seizure ===
The Fourth Amendment language states that "the right of the people to be secure in their persons...and effects, against unreasonable searches and seizures, shall not be violated, and no Warrants shall issue, but upon probable cause..." The Supreme Court has found that searches at the border are "inherently reasonable," because the government has a right to protect itself and its country (see also: border search exception). Therefore, reasonable suspicion is not required to conduct routine searches at the border. There are exceptions for "nonroutine searches" and "highly intrusive searches" such as strip searches, body cavity searches, x-ray searches or searches carried out in a "highly offensive or destructive manner," though the Supreme Court has not ruled on the level of suspicion required.

House alleged that the search of his devices was "highly intrusive" due to the personal nature of the information contained in the devices, and that it was also carried out in an offensive manner. He argued that the search of his personal electronic devices was akin to an intrusion of his thoughts, ideas, and communication with others. In its decision, the court cited Supreme Court cases, where body searches and strip searches were the only types of searches that had been consistently identified by the Court as "highly intrusive." The Supreme Court also defined several factors in determining whether a search was "highly intrusive," most of which involved physical contact and force. In this case, the court determined that House's search was not as "highly intrusive" as body cavity and strip searches, and was more comparable to the search of suitcases and other personal containers. Recalling United States v. Arnold, the court noted that reasonable suspicion was not required for a search of laptops or other electronic devices at the border, and concluded that the initial search and seizure of House's devices did not violate his Fourth Amendment Rights.

=== Fourth Amendment Challenge to the Duration of the Seizure of House's Devices ===
House further argued that in addition to the initial search, the prolonged detention of his devices for 7 weeks was also a Fourth Amendment violation. Defendants stated in response, that the extended retention was justified under the circumstances, as House did not provide his laptop password, the laptop had unfamiliar operating system, and there were a limited number of agents available to review House's devices. House then brought in Alexander Stamos, a forensic investigator, who testified that 49 days was an "unreasonable" length of time for ICE to review and investigate House's devices. Based on the review process described by Defendants, Stamos calculated that the entire procedure should not have exceeded 18 hours. Citing United States v. Cotterman, the court noted that the "...[g]overnment cannot simply seize property under its border search power and hold it for weeks, months, or years on a whim." It found that House had a plausible Fourth Amendment defense in the government's prolonged detention of his devices, and accordingly denied the Defendant's motion to dismiss House's Fourth Amendment claims.

=== First Amendment Challenge to the Search and Seizure ===
The First Amendment to the United States Constitution provides that "Congress shall make no law...abridging the freedom of speech...or the right of the people peaceably to assemble." House claimed that the search, seizure, retention, and dissemination of information regarding the Manning Support Network on his devices violated his right of association under the First Amendment. Although searches are generally covered by the Fourth Amendment, House argued that the search was based on, and specifically targeted his association with the Manning Support Network and WikiLeaks. He alleged that the government agents stopped him at the border because of his association with Manning, as they only questioned him after seizing his devices, and the questions revolved around House's relationship with Manning, the Manning Support Network, and WikiLeaks, rather than border control, customs, terrorism, or illegal activity.

The Defendants, citing U.S. v. Arnold and U.S. v. Ickes claimed in response that the agents incidentally uncovered the information about Manning while conducting a valid border search, which was not a violation of the First Amendment. However, the court observed that in both Arnold and Ickes, the content of the laptops was inspected and seized only after the incriminating material was discovered, whereas in this case, House's devices were seized before he was questioned. The court found that the government could not use an initial border search as a means to target an individual because of their political associations, and then proceed to seize, review, and disseminate information specifically regarding those associations. Citing Fighting Finest, Inc. v. Bratton and Lyng v. Int'l Union, the court noted that government actions affecting an individual's right of association could be considered a violation of the First Amendment if they were direct and substantial. In this case, the court concluded that House provided sufficient facts for a plausible First Amendment defense, and denied the Defendant's motion to dismiss House's First Amendment claims.

== Judgment ==
For the reasons stated above, the Defendant's motion to dismiss House's claims was denied.

=== House's Request for Injunctive Relief ===
House additionally requested injunctive relief, compelling the Defendants to reveal all recipients of the information copied from House's computer, and for the information to either be returned or destroyed. The Defendants claimed that even if House was successful on his constitutional claims, he was not entitled to request such relief. The court concluded it did not have all of the facts necessary to assess the circumstances and validity of House's request.

== Settlement ==
After several months of negotiations following the case, the government reached a settlement with House, agreeing to disclose numerous documents regarding the search, seizure, and investigation of House's devices, and destroy all information obtained from them. House did not make any requests for monetary relief, only that the confidential information concerning the Manning Support Network be returned to him.
