= United States v. Ramsey =

United States v. Ramsey may refer to the following legal cases:

- United States v. Ramsey (1926), 271 U.S. 467 (1926), on federal jurisdiction in Indian tribal lands
- United States v. Ramsey (1977), 431 U.S. 606 (1977), on the border search exception to the Fourth Amendment
