= Operation Angel Watch =

US anti-sex offender intelligence program

Operation Angel Watch is an intelligence-driven program targeting American registered sex offenders traveling abroad who the Department of Homeland Security's Immigration and Customs Enforcement department (ICE) believes are likely to engage in child sex tourism. By evaluating patterns and trends, ICE identifies high risk countries to compare with the travel plans of persons included in sex offender registry. Since the inception Operation Angel Watch, nearly 300 suspected CST perpetrators have been identified. In 2007, Angel Watch sent 1,700 leads to 100 countries.

The 2014 bill to establish the Angel Watch Center was described as an "International Megan's Law". A 2010 Government Accountability Office report had found that at least 4,500 U.S. passports were issued to registered sex offenders in fiscal year 2008. Congressman Chris Smith noted, "The goal is reciprocal notice between countries."

== Participating countries ==
- United Kingdom - June 25, 2015 the UK's National Crime Agency (NCA) signed an official agreement to reciprocally share information about the transnational travel of convicted sex offenders between the two countries. The stated purpose of the agreement is to: "The information is to be used for the purposes of enhancing the interdiction or investigation of these convicted child sex offenders, as well as making informed decisions regarding their admittance to the respective countries."

== Incidents ==
In 2007, Howard Cotterman's computer was subjected to a forensic evaluation after his name came up as flagged by TECS pursuant to Operation Angel Watch.

== Statistics ==
In fiscal year 2014, ICE provided notice of travel from the U.S. of approximately 2,300 convicted child sex offenders to over 120 countries.

== See also ==
- Operation Predator
