= O'Connor v. Ortega =

1987 United States Supreme Court case

- Supreme Court of the United States

Argued October 16, 1986 Decided March 31, 1987
- Full case name: Magno J. Ortega, Plaintiff-Appellant, v. Dennis M. O'Connor, Executive Director, Napa State Hospital; Richard Friday, Business Manager, Napa State Hospital, Dorothy Owen, Personnel Officer, Napa State Hospital; Stefan Donoviel, etc., et al., Defendants-Appellees.
- Citations: 480 U.S. 709 (more) 107 S. Ct. 1492; 94 L. Ed. 2d 714

Case history
- Prior: Summary judgement for petitioners rev'd, 764 F.2d 703 (9th Cir. 1985)
- Subsequent: Rev'd and remanded to district court, 817 F.2d 1408 (9th Cir. 1987), directed verdict rev'd and remanded 50 F.3d 778 (9th Cir. 1995), verdict for respondent aff'd, 146 F.3d 1149 (9th Cir. 1998).

Holding
- Fourth Amendment protections apply to public employees under investigation for violations of employer policy but only reasonable suspicion is necessary for search to be conducted; courts must consider operational realities of public workplaces when violations of Fourth Amendment are alleged.

Court membership
- Chief Justice William Rehnquist Associate Justices William J. Brennan Jr. · Byron White; Thurgood Marshall · Harry Blackmun; Lewis F. Powell Jr. · John P. Stevens; Sandra Day O'Connor · Antonin Scalia

Case opinions
- Plurality: O'Connor, joined by Rehnquist, White, Powell
- Concurrence: Scalia (in judgment)
- Dissent: Blackmun, joined by Brennan, Marshall, Stevens

Laws applied
- U.S. Const. amend. IV

O'Connor v. Ortega, 480 U.S. 709 (1987), is a United States Supreme Court decision on the Fourth Amendment rights of government employees with regard to administrative searches in the workplace, during investigations by supervisors for violations of employee policy rather than by law enforcement for criminal offenses. It was brought by Magno Ortega, a doctor at a California state hospital after his supervisors found allegedly inculpatory evidence in his office while he was on administrative leave pending an investigation of alleged misconduct. Some of what they uncovered was later used to impeach a witness who testified on his behalf at the hearing where he unsuccessfully appealed his dismissal.

Although lower courts had considered the issue, it was the first time the Supreme Court had. By a 5–4 margin, the Court ruled that public employees retain their Fourth Amendment rights. Justice Sandra Day O'Connor's plurality opinion established an "operating realities" test for future courts to consider when public employees challenged searches during investigations, reflecting the lower reasonable suspicion standard the government had to meet as an employer. That did not establish binding precedent, since Antonin Scalia argued in a separate concurring opinion that her standard was too vague, and that the same searches which would be reasonable for a private employer were proper when conducted by their public counterparts. Harry Blackmun wrote for four dissenting justices that the search was clearly an investigatory one and thus a breach of the doctor's privacy.

Since it could not decide how to apply that standard to Ortega's case as the record at that time did not establish whether the entry into Ortega's office had been for search purposes or not, the majority remanded the case to the district court. Eleven more years of litigation followed. At some points during it Ortega had to represent himself, and the Court itself had taken the unusual step of inviting Joel Klein to argue Ortega's case before them. It went back and forth between the district and appellate courts twice. Ortega finally prevailed after a jury trial in the late 1990s, and the Ninth Circuit denied Ortega's superiors their appeal.

Despite the two different standards resulting from the split five-justice majority, lower courts have generally followed O'Connor's "operational realities" test in future cases involving actual searches. Observers thought the justices might resolve the conflict the next time a similar case of public employees alleging a search violated their Fourth Amendment rights came before it. When it did, in 2010's Ontario v. Quon, they declined to do so, leaving the matter open for yet another future Court.

== Underlying dispute ==
In March 1981, Dr. Ortega, for 17 years the head of the psychiatric residency program at Napa State Hospital, a mental hospital in Napa, California, purchased a new Apple II computer to use in running the program. Half of the money for it had been donated by some of the residents; Ortega covered the rest. A month later, he asked Dr. Dennis O'Connor, the hospital's executive director and his superior, to sign some thank-you letters to the residents who had made contributions, and to authorize some purchase orders for peripherals and other accessories for the computer.

O'Connor was not sure whether the computer had been properly donated to the hospital, and hesitated to sign the letters. Two months later, Ortega suspended a resident for failing to report for a rotation. The resident complained to Dorothy Owen, the hospital's personnel director, that Ortega was retaliating against him for not only having not contributed to the purchase of the computer but advising other residents to ask him for their money back.

In late July, Owen told O'Connor of the resident's complaint. O'Connor asked Richard Friday, the hospital administrator, to begin an investigation into the resident's allegations specifically and the purchase of the computer generally. He gave Friday and his investigative team broad authority, including permission to search Ortega's office. The hospital otherwise had no policy on such searches.

O'Connor asked Ortega to take administrative leave the next day. Ortega instead received O'Connor's approval for two weeks of paid vacation, after which the administrative leave began. O'Connor told Ortega not to return to the hospital without his permission during his vacation. During the time Ortega was on vacation, Friday had the lock changed and kept the key in his own office.

When Ortega's vacation ended, O'Connor sent a letter to Ortega informing him he was now on paid administrative leave, and extending the restriction on visits to the hospital. Before Ortega had received it, he returned to the hospital. Finding his office door locked and unable to open it himself, he took the computer, then in an unsecured nearby room, home to work with it there, as he had done on occasion in the past.

Upon learning of this, O'Connor called the hospital police, believing that the computer was state property and thus Ortega had stolen it. At some other point during the time Ortega was on vacation and leave, a staff psychiatrist who ran a support group for residents told O'Connor about complaints of possible sexual harassment on Ortega's part from two female residents. It was not clear whether this took place before or after at least one thorough, highly intrusive search of Ortega's office. Materials were removed from Ortega's office, boxed and stored when the security guard performing the inventory found it too difficult to sort out Ortega's property from the state's.

On a separate visit to Ortega's office, Friday found several items—a Valentine, suggestively posed photo and inscribed book of love poetry—sent to Ortega several years earlier by a former resident. After the hospital fired Ortega in September, he appealed to the State Personnel Board. When the former resident testified on Ortega's behalf during the hearing, these items were introduced in an attempt to impeach her.

Owen asked Ortega after the firing if he wanted his personal possessions from his office returned. He did not. By spring of 1982 he had changed his mind. In response to another request, Asher Rubin, the deputy attorney general who had represented the state before the Personnel Board, told him he could make copies of his personal papers but could not keep the originals, nor any of his other personal property.

== Litigation ==
Ortega retained an attorney and filed a Section 1983 suit against O'Connor (who had now become director of the California Department of Mental Health), Owen, Friday, other parties and the state shortly afterwards in federal court, seeking $750,000 in compensatory and punitive damages. In addition to the violation of his Fourth Amendment protections against unreasonable search and seizure, he made tort claims for invasion of privacy and breach of covenant of good faith and fair dealings under California law. The defendants argued that they had entered Ortega's office and gone through the contents of his desk purely to inventory property and separate state-owned items from the doctor's personal possessions, which it claimed was standard practice when employees had resigned or been terminated. Both sides moved for summary judgement, which Judge John P. Vukasin Jr. granted to the defendants on all claims. It found that the entry into Ortega's office had been for the purpose of securing state property for use by a successor.

Ortega appealed to the Ninth Circuit. In 1985 a three-judge panel unanimously reversed the district court on the search but upheld it on the state-law tort claims. "The entry into the office seems to have been for no other purpose than to secure evidence for use in the ongoing investigation of Ortega," Judge Dorothy Wright Nelson wrote." While the state had said that the entry to the office was not intended as a search, she noted that at the time the doctor had not yet been fired or resigned but was merely on administrative leave. Nor did this seem to have been regularly undertaken in situations where it did apply.

After that finding, Wright considered whether such a warrantless search was reasonable under the Fourth Amendment. She applied the two-pronged test from the Supreme Court's 1967 Katz v. United States decision to establish whether Dr. Ortega had a reasonable expectation of privacy over the contents of his desk and office. First, did he have a subjective expectation that they would be left undisturbed by others, and second, would that expectation be one that society would consider reasonable and respect?

On the first prong, he had occupied the office for all 17 years of his employment. He kept within his desk not only personal papers and effects but confidential patient records. He had believed he had the only key, and was not aware of any other time during his employment at Napa in which his office had been entered without his permission. In Mancusi v. DeForte, the Supreme Court had held that an employee can have a reasonable expectation of privacy over his or her desk at work from searches by law enforcement. (Note: The Court, in that case, overturned the conviction of a Long Island labor union official on corruption and racketeering-related charges since the principal evidence had been taken from his desk by investigators who only had a subpoena.)

Two cases from the Third Circuit, with direct similarities to Ortega's, argued for the reasonableness of his privacy expectation. In one, the presence of sensitive and confidential documents within a desk (Note: In that case, a member of the Fair Lawn, New Jersey, school board had opened a guidance counselor's desk drawer and found the original draft of a pseudonymously published cartoon that ridiculed the board.) was held to strengthen the privacy expectation; and in the other, the personal lock that a police officer had used for his department locker led to the suppression of a sawed-off shotgun seized by federal agents.

In the latter case, the department had also lacked a formal policy on whether the lockers could be searched, as had been the case at Napa. This Wright used to distinguish it and Ortega's case from other precedents where warrantless searches of public employees' lockers, jackets or backpacks had been upheld due to broadly disseminated and actively implemented policies that such searches could occur at any time. "Here, Napa had never instituted surveillance or searches and had no general inspection policy that might have defeated Ortega's expectation of privacy in his office," she concluded.

The appeals court ordered the district court to enter judgement in Ortega's favor on that issue and hold proceedings to fix damages. The pendent state-law claims had not been filed in a timely fashion, and the panel affirmed that part of the summary judgement.

== Before the Court ==
The state of California's certiorari petition was granted by the Supreme Court in 1985. Since he was representing himself, Ortega filed his own brief. The Court invited Joel Klein, the future New York City Schools Chancellor then in private practice, to argue Ortega's case, and he also filed an amicus curiae brief on Ortega's behalf.

The appellants' brief was filed by California Attorney General John Van de Kamp and several of his assistants. Solicitor General Charles Fried filed an amicus brief on behalf of the federal government urging reversal. The American Civil Liberties Union and American Federation of State, County and Municipal Employees urged affirmance in their amici. Oral arguments were held in October 1986.

=== Petitioners' oral argument ===
Jeffrey T. Miller, one of Van de Kamp's deputies, argued for the petitioners. He did not deny that government employees had Fourth Amendment rights, but "the activity that took place in this case did not constitute a search within Fourth Amendment jurisprudence". He insisted that the Court should follow the district court's lead in finding that Dr. Ortega's office had been inventoried, not searched, until he was reminded that the district court had merely found the action to be a securing of the property in case Ortega returned to remove something else, and had not even used the word "inventory." It would not have been reasonable for the doctor to have imagined that no one else would or could have entered the office without his consent or knowledge in the 17 years he was employed at Napa.

Likewise, a desk was a "common repository", likely to be used by many people besides the one regularly seated behind it. "It is foreseeable that a number of different people working for government, from clerical staff to supervisors to colleagues, will move into an office, that is, enter an office, open a desk for a variety of reasons." When Justice Sandra Day O'Connor challenged him as to whether employees in the private sector would have a reasonable expectation of privacy over their desks, he agreed that they might but reminded her the Fourth Amendment does not apply to private employers.

He asked that the Court follow the logic of its 1985 ruling in New Jersey v. T. L. O. in which it had held that only a reasonable belief that evidence of misconduct would be found was needed to justify a search of a student or possessions on school property during school hours. Chief Justice William Rehnquist asked Miller if he was arguing the Fourth Amendment did not apply at all in schools. "it seems to me there is certainly language in T.L.O. against you on that point." That case, Miller responded, "had at least made the initial inquiry into whether the Fourth Amendment was applicable."

The other justices were not convinced that Ortega's office had been entered for inventory purposes. They pointed to facts in the record they saw as being at odds with the state's interpretation. Antonin Scalia asked if it were possible that the Court could rule that it was an inventory but the actions taken had exceeded the scope of those necessary to accomplish that. Miller said that would be moot as there was no expectation of privacy over the desk and office. He further explained that Ortega's key may have given him a subjective expectation of privacy, but not necessarily a reasonable one. Miller admitted to Thurgood Marshall that he did not know why the inventory could not have been done in Ortega's presence to better facilitate the sorting of property.

He noted that most public agencies have an Inspector General or something similar, who "every now and then drops in on offices to see if employees have their own things in their office". When Justice Byron White asked if his position implied that a public agency could search its employees' desks or offices at any time of the day or night, he said yes. "It may give rise to work grievances, to state and common law tort remedies ... but it would not violate the Fourth Amendment in our view."

=== Respondent's oral argument ===
"Our argument rests on three propositions", Klein told the justices. "[F]irst, that it is both customary and reasonable for a public employee to keep personal papers and effects in his work office and to expect that the privacy of such materials will be protected against arbitrary searches or seizures by his employer; second, that the application of the Fourth Amendment to office searches is not incompatible with the government's responsibilities as an employer."

Before he could get to the third, he was challenged by Scalia, who posited a situation where he might be working late and need to retrieve a document or file. He would find it on the desk of one of his law clerks, who might have gone home for the day. "Now," he asked, "have I conducted a Fourth Amendment search and seizure, and I am only immune from ... suit because it was reasonable?

Klein conceded to another justice's follow-up question that it was understood that, in all offices, "our expectation is, in the evenings, when people go home, others may on the basis of need enter ... The Fourth Amendment does not apply in most situations to a routine office entry, that is, if an employer or co-worker walks into your office looking for a paper clip." However, he said, that understanding did not defeat an expectation of privacy, likening it to a hotel room, where the Court had previously held there was an expectation of privacy even though hotel staff routinely enter for janitorial purposes. Scalia asked if it would be a Fourth Amendment violation if cleaning crews were to have looked through Ortega's desk and papers. "I don't think they would be exercising government authority in that situation", Klein answered, since the cleaning crews were presumably under instructions not to do so.

O'Connor asked if it would be reasonable for a supervisor to enter an office and look through a desk to "discover whatever might be appropriate for work-related wrongdoing of some kind?" As an example, she suggested, a supervisor might want to assess an employee's progress toward a deadline. Klein did not think so, since normally such matters are handled by asking the employee to produce whatever work has been completed.

To highlight his argument that the intrusion into Ortega's office had been a search rather than a property inventory, he used the example of the book of poetry, which was obviously personal property. "[I]f you pick up a book of poetry you don't have to open that book to find out who sent it to him." It was suggested that perhaps he read poetry to his patients, but Klein responded that the state had not suggested that and that, even if he did the book was still undeniably personal property.

He, too, compared the case with T.L.O., telling Justice White that he believed a search warrant might have been necessary to enter Ortega's office in this situation. "[L]et me just say that I think that they were looking for information to use against him to take his job away from him. He had been singled out", Klein said. "[E]ven if you take the T.L.O. standard, it is inconceivable that we could have a lower standard at the work place than we have at the school given the interests of employees and their adult age ... [T]here has to be reasonable suspicion when you go in to do the search that you will uncover evidence." If the state or the hospital had really wanted the right to enter employees' offices, it could have followed the example of the Mint and the Customs Service and promulgated a regulation stating that employees' property could be subject to search.

== Decision ==
Five months later, in March 1987, the Court handed down its decision. All nine justices agreed that public employees had Fourth Amendment protections during administrative searches in the workplace, and that routine work-related intrusions as discussed at oral argument did not constitute a violation. They differed as to whether Ortega's had been breached by the search. The five-justice majority believed it could not determine the purpose of the intrusion into Ortega's office and so remanded the case to the district court to do so.

Justice O'Connor wrote for a four-justice plurality that the same reasonable suspicion standard it developed for T.L.O. was applicable to administrative searches of public employees' workspace or possessions, since the "operational realities" of a public work environment may substantially reduce or eliminate a standard expectation of privacy. In a separate concurring opinion, Justice Scalia rejected that as too vague to be useful to lower courts, and proposed instead that any search that would be reasonable for a private employer would be permissible for a public one.

Justice Blackmun wrote for the four dissenting justices. He believed the majority had put too much weight on the different interpretations of the intrusion by the district and appellate courts, since he felt it was clearly an investigatory search for evidence against Dr. Ortega. Also, he charged, the majority had taken his concurrence in T.L.O. out of context to support its reasonableness standard. He did not feel, as they did, that outside of special cases such as the school system that it would have been detrimental to the operations of a public agency such as the hospital to have some sort of independent review and establish probable cause for an administrative search related to possible violations of policy.

=== Plurality opinion ===
After recounting the history of the case and the sweep of the Court's prior Fourth Amendment jurisprudence, O'Connor, joined by Chief Justice Rehnquist, Justice White, and Justice Powell, defined the boundaries of the workplace context as "those areas and items that are related to work and are generally within the employer's control." Some items that passed through the workplace were personal, and as the Court had ruled in Mancusi, a reasonable expectation of privacy may exist there. "[W]e reject the contention made by the Solicitor General and petitioners that public employees can never have a reasonable expectation of privacy in their place of work," she wrote. "Individuals do not lose Fourth Amendment rights merely because they work for the government, instead of a private employer."

She immediately qualified that holding.

The operational realities of the workplace, however, may make some employees' expectations of privacy unreasonable when an intrusion is by a supervisor, rather than a law enforcement official. Public employees' expectations of privacy in their offices, desks, and file cabinets, like similar expectations of employees in the private sector, may be reduced by virtue of actual office practices and procedures, or by legitimate regulation ... An office is seldom a private enclave free from entry by supervisors, other employees, and business and personal invitees. Instead, in many cases offices are continually entered by fellow employees and other visitors during the workday for conferences, consultations, and other work-related visits. Simply put, it is the nature of government offices that others—such as fellow employees, supervisors, consensual visitors, and the general public—may have frequent access to an individual's office.

Moving from the general principle to the case at hand, O'Connor agreed that Ortega had that same reasonable expectation of privacy, but that since the record did not reflect the extent of whatever legitimate work-related reasons the hospital administrators might have had to enter the office, the Ninth Circuit should have remanded the case to the district court to determine that, as the majority was doing. Following T.L.O., she said the inquiry should not stop with determining the Fourth Amendment applied, but whether the context made the search reasonable. "We must balance the invasion of the employees' legitimate expectations of privacy against the government's need for supervision, control, and the efficient operation of the workplace."

There was, O'Connor admitted, "surprisingly little case law" on the subject. That which existed did seem to support the standard she proposed for work-related searches, most notably a 1973 case from the Seventh Circuit in which the surreptitious recording of an Internal Revenue Service's agent's conversations at his desk by the agency's internal investigators was held to be reasonable and work-related, and a 1951 case from the D.C. Circuit which held that although a search of the appellee's desk by local police with her government supervisor's permission was unconstitutional, a work-related search by her supervisor would not have been. She distinguished these from other cases that proposed other standards for public workplace searches by noting that those cases were either not work-related or involved criminal misconduct.

"In our view," O'Connor continued,

requiring an employer to obtain a warrant whenever the employer wished to enter an employee's office, desk, or file cabinets for a work-related purpose would seriously disrupt the routine conduct of business and would be unduly burdensome. Imposing unwieldy warrant procedures in such cases upon supervisors, who would otherwise have no reason to be familiar with such procedures, is simply unreasonable.

She quoted from Connick v. Myers, an earlier case which had considered the First Amendment rights of an assistant prosecutor fired for allegedly disruptive behavior: "[G]overnment offices could not function if every employment decision became a constitutional matter."

O'Connor announced that the Court would consider only the constitutionality of work-related and investigatory searches "and leave for another day inquiry into other circumstances." She found "the efficient and proper operation of the workplace" to similarly justify investigatory searches, since supervisors had different needs from law enforcement. "The delay in correcting the employee misconduct caused by the need for probable cause, rather than reasonable suspicion, will be translated into tangible and often irreparable damage to the agency's work, and ultimately to the public interest." She again cited T.L.O. to justify this standard. "Government offices are provided to employees for the sole purpose of facilitating the work of an agency. The employee may avoid exposing personal belongings at work by simply leaving them at home."

Lastly O'Connor found the district court's finding on summary judgment that the intrusion was for the purposes of securing state property to be in error since there was a genuine dispute of fact. It followed then that the appellate court could not have made a definitive finding of fact either. The case was remanded to the district court with instructions to both determine what justified the search and seizure of Ortega's property and whether that search was reasonable in both its inception and scope.

=== Scalia concurrence ===
Justice Scalia agreed that the case should be remanded, but felt it was not helpful to call for a case-by-case assessment, since it was difficult to make practical use of. He found fault with O'Connor's comment, justifying her "operating realities" test, that some public workplaces might be "so open" as to offer no reasonable expectation of privacy. "No clue is provided as to how open 'so open' must be; much less is it suggested how police officers are to gather the facts necessary for this refined inquiry ... [I]t is so devoid of content that it produces, rather than eliminates, uncertainty in this field."

The plurality's standard could not be right if it led to a conclusion that the Fourth Amendment did not apply to a work-related entry into Ortega's office.

It is privacy that is protected by the Fourth Amendment, not solitude. A man enjoys Fourth Amendment protection in his home, for example, even though his wife and children have the run of the place—and indeed, even though his landlord has the right to conduct unannounced inspections at any time.

Whether it was a supervisor or police officer entering the office, he said, only made a difference as to whether the search was reasonable, not whether the Fourth Amendment applies. When a firefighter enters a house where an alarm has gone off, he noted, "we do not ask whether the occupant has a reasonable expectation of privacy (and hence Fourth Amendment protection) vis-a-vis firemen, but rather whether—given the fact that the Fourth Amendment covers private dwellings—intrusion for the purpose of extinguishing a fire is reasonable", citing the Court's Michigan v. Tyler ruling. (Note: That case had dealt with Fourth Amendment rights during the subsequent investigations of the fire, not the firefighters' initial entry.)

Scalia argued that the offices and desks of public employees were covered by the Fourth Amendment as a general matter, choosing his words to avoid the Katz rule that places exposed to public view are not covered by the Fourth Amendment since some government offices, as O'Connor had noted, were subject to unrestricted public access. "Government searches to retrieve work-related materials or to investigate violations of workplace rules—searches of the sort that are regarded as reasonable and normal in the private employer context—do not violate the Fourth Amendment." Since the evidence in the case did not support a summary judgement, he joined his colleagues in ordering the case remanded.

=== Dissent ===
At the outset of his dissent, signed by Justices Brennan, Marshall and Stevens, Justice Blackmun said "The facts of this case are simple and straightforward. Dr. Ortega had an expectation of privacy in his office, desk, and file cabinets, which were the target of a search by petitioners that can be characterized only as investigatory in nature." He disagreed with the plurality that there was anything special about a public workplace that justified a lower standard for such searches, and called the intrusion an unconstitutional search. Not only had it found what were to him clear facts in dispute, (Note: In his footnote 3, Blackmun accused the plurality of letting its opinion on this issue be shaped by its members' antipathy to public workers.) it had nevertheless chosen to derive a standard from a case it had remanded to resolve that dispute. "As a result, the standard that emerges makes reasonable almost any workplace search by a public employer."

As to the facts, Blackmun contended the plurality had been confused, partially relying on Ortega's removal of the computer as a reason to consider the intrusion reasonable when, he noted, the record itself had testimony from Friday that this had not triggered the search. Dr. O'Connor had further admitted in his deposition that there was an investigatory interest in the contents of Ortega's office. The searchers had also consulted with a lawyer and waited until the evening. "The search in question stemmed neither from a Hospital policy nor from a practice of routine entrances into Dr. Ortega's office", he wrote. "It was plainly exceptional and investigatory in nature. Accordingly, there is no significant factual dispute in this case."

Blackmun began his disagreement with the plurality's embrace of the reasonable suspicion standard by agreeing with it that government employees retained their Fourth Amendment rights at work. He accepted as well that routine work-related intrusions might diminish their expectation of privacy. He did not accept that such intrusions would eliminate it.

The Court had always recognized Fourth Amendment rights in offices, he said, despite the understanding that it would be visited by others. The plurality did recognize, he conceded, another point: that a search unreasonable in one context might be reasonable in another. (Note: In his footnote 2, Blackmun responded to Scalia's criticism by quoting from other opinions, most by his fellow dissenters, to the effect that a case-by-case analysis might be the only way to create effective Fourth Amendment jurisprudence) But

[...] the reality of work in modern time, whether done by public or private employees, reveals why a public employee's expectation of privacy in the workplace should be carefully safeguarded and not lightly set aside. It is, unfortunately, all too true that the workplace has become another home for most working Americans. Many employees spend the better part of their days and much of their evenings at work. [...] As a result, the tidy distinctions (to which the plurality alludes) between the workplace and professional affairs, on the one hand, and personal possessions and private activities, on the other, do not exist in reality. Thus, the plurality's remark that the "employee may avoid exposing personal belongings at work by simply leaving them at home," reveals on [their part] a certain insensitivity to the "operational realities of the workplace"

Thus he thought it especially important that the context of the search be considered.

Justice Blackmun reminded the plurality that his concurring opinion in T.L.O., from which Justice O'Connor had drawn support for her "special need" argument, was meant to address an error he believed that case's plurality had made. The balancing test he had proposed there was not needed here, since "[t]here was no special practical need that might have justified dispensing with the warrant and probable cause requirements." The time and effort required to get a warrant, he said, would not have detracted from the hospital's mission of providing quality patient care and educating new psychiatrists. An independent review by a magistrate might, he added, have helped make the search not only constitutional but more efficient, since they would have been forced to list and justify every aspect of the office and desk they wished to look through.

And even if there were a special need, the balancing test would still not be necessary.

It is certainly correct that a public employer cannot be expected to obtain a warrant for every routine entry into an employee's workplace. This situation, however, should not justify dispensing with a warrant in all searches by the employer. The warrant requirement is perfectly suited for many work-related searches, including the instant one.

Despite claiming to have drawn well-defined standards from the facts of the case, the two categories of searches it had approved as not requiring warrants, they were, Blackmun felt, so broadly drawn that "it is difficult to imagine a search that would not fit into one or the other ..."

== Reaction ==
The case was closely watched by the parties to National Treasury Employees Union v. Von Raab, then on appeal to the Fifth Circuit and seen as likely to reach the Supreme Court (as it eventually did). It involved a challenge by employees of the United States Customs Service to a proposal by the agency that employees in certain positions submit to mandatory drug testing. The employees' union had sued to block it, arguing it was a violation of their Fourth Amendment protections.

The union and the American Civil Liberties Union, which had also filed an amicus brief urging affirmance in O'Connor, praised the court's holding that public employees had Fourth Amendment rights in the workplace. They said it made their arguments in Von Raab stronger. The Justice Department maintained that it still believed the Customs Service's drug testing requirement would be held constitutional.

== Disposition ==
Within two months of the Court's decision the Ninth Circuit formally remanded it to the district court. A new trial was held five years later, in 1992, again before Judge Vukasin. Dr. Ortega once again had to represent himself, and when the defense failed to receive his witness list the court sanctioned him by refusing to allow him to present them. As a result, he was largely limited to cross-examining the opposing witnesses, and when the defense was done presenting its case the court granted its motion for a directed verdict.

Ortega appealed to the Ninth Circuit again, retaining his lawyer to do so. He challenged not only the sanctioning but the trial court's refusal to let him include Asher Rubin as a defendant. In late 1994 a three-judge panel heard the case; it announced its decision five months later.

Circuit judge Diarmuid O'Scannlain wrote for a unanimous panel that the sanctions, while within limits of judicial discretion, had so adversely affected Ortega's case that the verdict was tainted. Reduced to merely cross-examining opposing witnesses, he could not present his own case-in-chief. And, further, they were unjustified as the trial record included a letter from Ortega to Paul Hammerness, the assistant attorney general handling the case, referring to "the enclosed witness list", that had been stamped as received by the court in November 1992.

"The court appears to have overlooked this evidence of Dr. Ortega's compliance", O'Scannlain wrote. "Dr. Ortega's compliance is not negated by the fact that opposing counsel failed to receive the list." Therefore, the sanctions against his witnesses had clearly been erroneous. The panel then affirmed the district court on its denial of the additional defendant, as the district court that had first heard the case dismissed that defendant on prosecutorial immunity grounds. Had Ortega wished to challenge that holding, the panel said, he had to have done so on his original appeal to the Ninth Circuit.

On remand, O'Connor and Friday, the only defendants left, changed their strategy and asserted qualified immunity, (Note: Qualified immunity bars suits against those acting under color of law for actions that might have been illegal, or were later prohibited, but for which there was a lack of settled law at the time.) for the first time, dropping their claim that the need to secure or inventory state property justified their intrusion. Instead, they said, the claims of misconduct, particularly the alleged sexual harassment, made it necessary. During pretrial motions, Judge Marilyn Hall Patel, who took over the case since Vukasin had died, barred the use of qualified immunity and ruled that sexual harassment could not have justified the search. As a result, both parties agreed not to introduce the book of poetry, photo and Valentine.

A jury found for Ortega on all his claims. It awarded him $376,000 in compensatory damages, and $35,000 and $25,000 respectively against O'Connor and Friday respectively. Afterward, the district court awarded almost $32,000 in attorney's fees. O'Connor and Friday appealed.

A three-judge panel, including two of the judges who had been on the 1985 panel, found Patel's rulings on qualified immunity and the sexual harassment claims worthy of consideration. Stephen Reinhardt, one of those original judges, noted that Judge Vukasin had rejected the qualified immunuity defense at the first trial and that the jury instructions Patel and both sides had approved made such a defense possible even if the exact words "qualified immunity" were not used. Nor were the defendants correct in arguing that there was no settled law before the Supreme Court's ruling. "[I]t was clearly established in 1981 that, in the absence of an accepted practice or regulation to the contrary, government employees such as Dr. Ortega had a reasonable expectation of privacy in their private offices, desks, and file cabinets, thereby triggering the protections of the Fourth Amendment with regard to searches and seizures", Reinhardt wrote. He quoted explicit language to that effect from the Supreme Court's 1966 holding in Hoffa v. United States and noted the Supreme Court plurality's citation of existing lower-court holdings saying the same thing. Even if it had not been, it was not "reasonable under the circumstances", as Terry v. Ohio required.

Neither this court, nor any other court had, as of 1981, ever suggested that a general or indiscriminate workplace search, or a workplace search not reasonably related to work itself or to specific work related misconduct, would be constitutional, unless the individual had consented to such a search as a condition of employment ... The defendants, therefore, could not have prevailed on their qualified immunity defense under any set of lawful qualified immunity instructions.

O'Connor and Friday had argued that, by denying them the opportunity to raise the sexual harassment claims as a justification for the search, Patel had improperly granted what amounted to sua sponte partial summary judgement against them. Reinhardt countered that they had had adequate time to develop their defense and so the judge was "procedurally free" to do that. He turned to whether such a ruling was justified and not an abuse of discretion. Even if he resolved an issue of disputed fact in their favor and assumed that O'Connor and Friday knew of the sexual harassment allegations before they went into Ortega's office, the allegations themselves were vague, and one of them was ten years old. Thus, he continued, they did not create a reasonable suspicion that he was harassing residents, and even if they did they could not have reasonably established a likelihood that evidence supporting them would be found there. "The search was, at best, a general and unbounded pursuit of anything that might tend to indicate any sort of malfeasance—a search that is almost by definition, unreasonable." It had also been properly excluded since its prejudicial value outweighed its probative value.

"It is now seventeen years since the search of Dr. Ortega's office occurred and his most personal letters and possessions were examined and seized. It is time to bring this matter to a conclusion", wrote Reinhardt. He dismissed the remaining grounds for appeal as meritless, and the panel unanimously upheld the district court. The appellate decision was not further appealed.

After the state paid his claim, amounting to over $700,000 with interest, Dr. Ortega was sued by one of his former attorneys for unpaid bills. The two settled the claim in arbitration, but after Ortega refused to comply, the attorney sued him and won an adjustment to the arbitration award correcting some errors made in calculating the interest rate. A state appellate court upheld the trial court verdict in 2001, saying Ortega's "often rambling and incoherent narratives" in briefs he wrote himself left them with little in the way of substantive legal argument. Ortega died in 2009.

== Subsequent jurisprudence ==
The first case after O'Connor to involve the Fourth Amendment rights of government employees at work was, as expected, National Treasury Employees Union v. Von Raab. A 5–4 majority held that the urine testing the Customs Service proposed for internal promotion to positions involving drug interdiction, carrying firearms or handling classified material was reasonable since it was "not designed to serve the ordinary needs of law enforcement." Scalia, in a dissent joined by Stevens, called the program "a kind of immolation of privacy and human dignity in symbolic opposition to drug use". The Customs Service, he said, had not introduced "real evidence of a real problem that will be solved by urine testing."

Later, when turning down a 1997 challenge by employees of Puerto Rico Telephone to a proposed video surveillance plan, Judge Bruce M. Selya of the First Circuit called O'Connor "[t]he watershed case in this enclave of Fourth Amendment jurisprudence". His opinion surveyed a number of other district and circuit cases considering the "operating realities" of public workplaces to establish whether a legitimate expectation of privacy existed.

A key issue was whether the workplace or portion in question was reserved for the employee's personal use. A judge in the District of Kansas had granted summary judgement to Johnson County Community College against its security guards who challenged its video surveillance of their locker room by noting that the locker area under view was not exclusive to any of them. This distinguished it from the Drug Enforcement Administration's surreptitious videotaping of two agents convicted of illegal wiretapping, where the Ninth Circuit suppressed the videos because it found the agents had exclusive use of their offices.

In a New York case that echoed Scalia's questions to Klein at oral argument, the Second Circuit found it reasonable for a judge to have court officers seize the contents of his just-fired law clerk's desk since the relationship between the two required free and complete access to each other's papers. As in cases preceding O'Connor, a workplace policy on searches has been held to defeat or diminish expectations of privacy. The Ninth Circuit upheld a civilian engineer's discharge from the Naval Reserve was upheld on the grounds that regular workplace searches removed any expectation of privacy over documents revealing his bisexuality. An unenforced or absent policy has been held to create a legitimate expectation.

=== Ontario v. Quon ===
As Ortega's dispute with his lawyer was coming to an end, elsewhere in California the events were unfolding that would lead to the next case where the Court would consider the Fourth Amendment rights of public employees during administrative investigations. In 2000, the city of Ontario purchased 20 alphanumeric pagers for its police department SWAT team to carry on and off-duty. A department policy, never put in writing, said that "light personal use" was permitted but that the pager messages could be audited at any time.

Several officers routinely exceeded the monthly character limit. The lieutenant in charge of the pagers at first allowed them to reimburse the city for the overage fees in exchange for not auditing the messages. Later, when he was "tired of being a bill collector", he and his superiors decided to audit the text messages to see if the character limit was too low.

Transcripts of the pager messages, redacted to include those sent only during work hours, showed that many of them were not work-related, and some were sexually explicit. Two officers were disciplined. Afterwards, they sued the superior officers, the department, the city and the pager provider for violation of the Stored Communications Act and their Fourth Amendment rights. The district court held a jury trial, which determined the audit was work-related, and it ruled for the defendants.

On appeal the Ninth Circuit reversed, calling the audit an unreasonable search. After being denied their petition for an en banc rehearing, the defendants successfully petitioned the Supreme Court for certiorari. The Court would only consider the Fourth Amendment claim, so the wireless provider was dropped as a petitioner there.

The case received much attention since it also was the first time the Court had considered Fourth Amendment rights in the rapidly expanding area of electronic telecommunications. Only Scalia and Stevens remained from the O'Connor court. As a result, it was also seen as a possible chance to resolve the conflict between the plurality's "operating realities" standard and Scalia's.

In June 2010, the Court unanimously upheld the search. Instead of choosing one of the O'Connor standards, it applied them both. Anthony Kennedy wrote for a seven-justice majority that since the audit had had a legitimate work-related purpose and its scope was limited to the pager messages sent at work, it was reasonable enough for the plurality in that case, and it would have been reasonable for a private-sector employer as Scalia had proposed.

Stevens and Scalia both wrote separate concurring opinions. The former felt that, under the case-by-case approach Blackmun had advocated in his O'Connor dissent, Quon in this case knew or should have known all his communications could have come under public scrutiny. Scalia's opinion of the "operational realities" test remained unchanged. He called it "standardless and unsupported" and said the Quon majority "underscores the unworkability of that standard".

== Analysis and commentary ==
When considering what approach the Court would take in Quon, George Washington University law professor Orin Kerr, a Fourth Amendment scholar, noted that courts have generally used the plurality standard from O'Connor. "Exactly how you get there is sort of tricky, though", he commented. "So courts have mostly just figured that four Justices is more than one and that they should follow the analysis in the concurring opinion."

O'Connor biographer Ann Cary McFeatters writes that her and Scalia's separate opinions in this case were the first of many clashes between the two justices in their joint tenure on the Court. "It would not be the last time Scalia went after her with verbal venom. It would not be the last time his doctrinaire certitude conflicted with her case-by-case approach."

== See also ==
- Special needs exception
