= Operation Angel =

Operation Angel may refer to:

- Operation Angel, an Australian humanitarian organisation founded by Jacqueline Pascarl
- Operation Angel, a British charity headed by Sally Becker
- Operation Angel Watch is an U.S. international program for reciprocal intelligence exchange regarding the transnational travel of convicted sex offenders.

== See also ==
- Angel Operation, the Chinese title of the 1987 film Angel
