= United States v. Arnold =

- Court: United States Court of Appeals for the Ninth Circuit
- Decided: April 21, 2008
- Citations: 523 F.3d 941, amended on denial of rehearing en banc, 533 F.3d 1003

Case history
- Prior history: 454 F. Supp. 2d 999 (C.D. Cal. 2006)
- Subsequent history: Amended July 10, 2008; Petition for writ of certiorari denied.

Holding
- A search of an individual's laptop computer does not require reasonable suspicion when entering the United States at the border or equivalent thereof.

Court membership
- Judges sitting: Diarmuid O'Scannlain, Milan Smith, Michael W. Mosman

United States v. Arnold, 533 F.3d 1003 (9th Cir. 2008), is a United States court case in which the United States Court of Appeals for the Ninth Circuit held that the Fourth Amendment to the United States Constitution does not require government agents to have reasonable suspicion before searching laptops or other digital devices at the border, including international airports.

This decision has caused worry and some controversy among Fourth Amendment advocates, such as the Electronic Frontier Foundation. Especially troubled are those that legitimately store sensitive business, legal, or customer data; who worry that federal agents might leak information found from laptop searches. Several legislators have discussed and introduced measures to counter the ruling in order to provide more protection to travelers, but none have become law.

== Background to the case ==
On July 17, 2005, Michael Arnold arrived at Los Angeles International Airport (LAX) after spending a three-week vacation in the Philippines. After retrieving his luggage, Arnold proceeded through the checkpoint at customs. Customs and Border Protection (CBP) Officer Laura Peng saw Arnold waiting in line and selected him for secondary questioning.

Peng questioned Arnold, and began inspecting his luggage, noting a laptop computer and several computer accessories. Peng instructed Arnold to turn on the computer so she could see if it was functioning. CBP Officer John Roberts was called to assist with the inspection while the computer was booting up.

Among the icons displayed on the computer's desktop, two were named "Kodak Pictures" and one was named "Kodak Memories". Peng and Roberts opened these folders, began viewing the photos, and noted one that depicted two nude women. At that point special agents from U.S. Department of Homeland Security, Immigration and Customs Enforcement (ICE) were called. Arnold was detained and questioned by the ICE agents for several hours. They further examined the computer and equipment, and found numerous images of what they believed to be child pornography.

Arnold was released, but his computer was seized by the agents. Federal agents obtained a warrant two weeks later. Arnold was charged with (1) knowingly transporting child pornography, (2) knowingly possessing a computer hard drive and compact discs which both contained more than one image of child pornography, and (3) knowingly and intentionally traveling in foreign commerce and attempting to engage in illicit sexual conduct with a person under 18 years of age.

Arnold filed for a motion to suppress, and argued that the government required reasonable suspicion to conduct the search. This motion was granted by the District Court, ruling in Arnold's favor. The Government promptly appealed the case, and stated that the border doctrine took precedence over the Fourth Amendment's protection from unreasonable search. The Ninth Circuit Court of Appeals overturned the lower court's ruling, holding in favor of the Government. Arnold was represented in the District Court and before the Ninth Circuit by Marilyn E. Bednarski and Kevin J. LaHue, of Kaye, McLane, Bednarski, & Litt.

== Arguments ==
=== Reasonable search ===
The crux of Arnold's argument is that a laptop is very similar to a person's home and the human mind, much more so than an ordinary container for data. His argument is based on the notion that a laptop has the ability to store a greater amount of data and personal documents, much like those stored in one's home. He continued to argue that because a laptop is able to record ideas, e-mail, internet chats, and web-surfing habits, it is very similar to the "human mind." Under these arguments he sought the protection of the Fourth Amendment, which states that "the right of the people to be secure in their persons, houses, papers, and effects, against unreasonable searches and seizures, shall not be violated ... ".

Arnold also raised the exception that the government's searches are limited in cases where they are of a "particularly offensive manner," and argued that such was the case when CBP officers seized and searched his laptop.

The Electronic Frontier Foundation filed an amicus brief in support of Arnold. The amici included the EFF and the Association of Corporate Travel Executives (ACTE). The brief argued that the government's position and current practice subjects travelers to unconstitutional invasive searches of laptops and other devices. Their argument is similar to that already made by Arnold, and they contended mainly that a computer is different from a gas tank, suitcase, or other closed container because laptops routinely contain some of the most personal information about a person's life. Moreover, the amici were concerned that a search would reveal information that is already protected under other statutes, including privileged legal communications, reporters' notes from confidential sources, and trade secrets.

In summary, the main points of the brief are that: (1) people have a reasonable expectation of privacy in the information stored on their laptop computers; (2) searches of personal electronic information devices ... are particularly invasive of personal privacy; (3) the volume of information stored on computers means that the privacy invasion of a laptop border search is enormous; (4) personal computers often contain information that the individual does not know about, or has even sought to erase; (5) laptop computer searches are indistinguishable from "general searches;" (6) there is a real risk of unconstrained "pretext" searches; and (7) the first amendment protects many of the contents on laptop computers. The final point raised the worry that indiscriminate searches of information stored on laptops will discourage people from storing sensitive data, thus causing a chilling effect on speech.

A personal computer is among a person's most private belongings. Laptop computers are virtual extensions of the mind, used to record and share our thoughts, feelings, and activities; indeed, "they are postal services, playgrounds, jukeboxes, dating services, movie theaters, daily planners, shopping malls, personal secretaries, virtual diaries, and more." ... [a]s a result, our laptop computers contain as much information about us as our homes contain - perhaps more.

Overall, the amici were concerned that unchecked compliance with the border doctrine would infringe too far on a citizen's First and Fourth Amendment rights. In their view, the doctrine did not provide the protection that it was meant to enact, as technology now provides ways to maneuver around it. " ... a smuggler's 'container of choice' for electronic contraband is the internet. They may simply email it to themselves or post it online to avoid customs searches. A ruling that overturns the decision would not undermine the government's ability to protect its borders."

=== Border doctrine ===
In response to Arnold's motion to suppress, the government argued two points. Firstly, the Fourth Amendment did not require reasonable suspicion because of the border doctrine. Secondly, even if reasonable suspicion were required, it was present.

The government argued that the United States has a duty to take measures to ensure the safety of its interior. Past cases have stated that "it is axiomatic that the United States, as sovereign, has the inherent authority to protect, and a paramount interest in protecting, its territorial integrity." In United States v. Ramsey, the court stated that "searches made at the border ... are reasonable simply by virtue of the fact that they occur at the border ... " In the case of Arnold, the point that linked these two conclusions together was the notion that international American airports are the functional equivalent of a border, as stated in Almeida-Sanchez v. United States.

Reference was also made to a history of searches of closed containers such as a briefcases, purses, wallets, pockets, pictures, film, and other graphic material. These items are the equivalent of a closed container, and have traditionally been searched at the border without particularized suspicion. It is acknowledged that some limits have been made, specifically a traveler's alimentary canal. Such limitations are made when searching a person, not their objects in possession, in the interest of human dignity and privacy, which the Fourth Amendment protects.

== Judgment ==
=== Reasonable search ===
The Court addressed the argument that the search of Arnold's laptop was carried out in a particularly offensive manner, and was so destructive that it required particularized suspicion. The court acknowledged that there was no precedent to declare when a border search should be deemed unreasonable. The Supreme Court has left open the question of the circumstances that make a search particularly offensive, and thus unreasonable. However, the Court pointed out that Arnold never claimed that his laptop was damaged in any way during the government's search.

Even without a clear scale to determine how offensive a search may be, the Court dismissed the reasoning of the District Court that particularized suspicion was needed in the case of Arnold. The District Court-based this decision on previous cases that related to search of the human body, not of property.

=== Border doctrine ===
The Court distinguished searches at American airports because they are considered border searches, and occur at the "functional equivalent of a border". Previously, the Supreme Court had stated that:

The authority of the United States to search the baggage of arriving international travelers is based on its inherent sovereign authority to protect its territorial integrity. By reason of that authority, it is entitled to require that whoever seeks entry must establish the right to enter and to bring into the country whatever he may carry ...

— Torres v. Puerto Rico, 442 U.S. 465, 472-73 (1979).

To address Arnold's claim that a laptop is like a home, and therefore requires Fourth Amendment protection, the court dismissed his argument as without merit. Its decision is based on previous Supreme Court judgments that have denied Fourth Amendment protections to property which is also "capable of functioning as a home."

Lastly, the Court addressed a comparison to United States v. Ickes, 393 F.3d 501 (4th Cir. 2005). In that case, a man's van was stopped and searched as he was driving from Canada into the United States. The court upheld the border search doctrine, and the Ninth Circuit acknowledged the concerns and followed the reasoning that carving out a First Amendment exception to the border doctrine would (1) protect terrorist communications "which are inherently 'expressive'"; (2) create an unworkable standard for government agents who "would have to decide - on their feet - which expressive material is covered by the First Amendment"; and (3) contravene the weight of Supreme Court precedent refusing to subject government action to greater scrutiny with respect to the Fourth Amendment when an alleged First Amendment interest is also at stake."

By this reasoning, the Court justified the government's interest in preventing unwanted persons and effects as greater than a person's desire to conceal the contents of their baggage. The decision of the District Court was overturned, ruling in favor of the government.

== Subsequent developments ==
=== Death of Arnold ===
On February 23, 2009, the Supreme Court of the United States notified Arnold's counsel that it had denied Arnold's petition for writ of certiorari. Attorneys for Arnold filed a motion to de-publish the Ninth Circuit opinion (which was denied). In their motion, Arnold's counsel explained that two days after being informed of the Supreme Court's refusal to hear his appeal, Arnold committed suicide.

=== Controversy ===
This ruling has caused much controversy and discussion among First and Fourth Amendment rights activists, including the American Civil Liberties Union and the Electronic Frontier Foundation. One of the primary points of controversy is the court's ruling that a laptop is no different from any other type of container. Just as Arnold has argued, critics argue that a laptop contains far more sensitive and personal data than any ordinary container. They continue to state that a laptop search is so revealing and invasive that the Fourth Amendment requires agents to have some reasonable suspicion to justify the intrusion.

The Electronic Frontier Foundation expressed their disappointment in its statement:

The opinion is almost certainly wrong to classify laptop searches as no different from other property searches. Fourth Amendment law constrains police from conducting arbitrary searches, implements respect for social privacy norms, and seeks to maintain traditional privacy rights in the face of technological changes. This Arnold opinion fails to protect travelers in these traditional Fourth Amendment ways.

Other critics have cited that there are some documents and data that need to be legitimately kept secret or discreet, and are worried that there is nothing to prevent the officials involved in a search from disclosing this sensitive data. They give examples of trade secrets, acquisition plans, plans for a new product, security data about private customers. The concern is that officials in the process of searching may copy and leak this information without consent. Most are unwilling to trust government officials and employees to not misuse what they seize or negligently disclose confidential information.

=== Department of Homeland Security policies after Arnold ===
On August 1, 2008, the Washington Post reported that Department of Homeland Security policies allow federal agents to "take a traveler's laptop computer or other electronic device to an off-site location for an unspecified period of time without any suspicion of wrongdoing." Further, "officials may share copies of the laptop's contents with other agencies and private entities for language translation, data decryption or other reasons." Senator Russell Feingold called these policies "truly alarming" and said that he intends to introduce legislation soon that would require reasonable suspicion for border searches, as well as prohibit profiling on race, religion, or national origin. Meanwhile, Ryan Singel of Wired.com recommended placing one's electronics and papers "in a first class U.S. mail envelope and stamp it—or even better mail it to yourself before the trip," since 'officers may not read or permit others to read correspondence contained in sealed letter class mail (the international equivalent of First Class) without an appropriate search warrant or consent'. However, this only applies to articles in the postal system, not to letters carried by individuals or private carriers such as DHL, UPS, or FedEx.

=== Travelers Privacy Protection Act ===
Senator Feingold, fellow Democratic Senator Maria Cantwell, and Democratic Representative Adam Smith announced on September 26, 2008, that they had proposed a law to limit the searches of laptops or other electronic devices to cases where United States Customs and Border Protection officials have reasonable suspicion of illegal activity. The so-called Travelers' Privacy Protection Act would allow border agents to search electronic devices only if they had reasonable suspicions of wrongdoing. In addition, the legislation would limit the length of time that a device could be out of its owner's possession to 24 hours, after which the search becomes a seizure, requiring probable cause. This bill was introduced, but never became law due to the starting of the new 111th session of Congress.

== See also ==
- Border search exception
- Computer forensics
- Carroll v. United States (1925)
- Olmstead v. United States (1928)
- United States v. Ramsey (1977)
- California v. Acevedo (1991)
- United States v. Flores-Montano (2004)
- United States v. Cotterman (2013)
