= Reasonable suspicion =

Legal standard of proof in United States law that is less than probable cause

Reasonable suspicion or reasonable articulable suspicion is a legal standard of proof that may be required in many jurisdictions, particularly in common law countries. In the United States law it is considered less than probable cause, the legal standard for arrests and warrants, but more than an "inchoate and unparticularized suspicion or 'hunch'"; it must be based on "specific and articulable facts", "taken together with rational inferences from those facts", and the suspicion must be associated with the specific individual.

If law enforcement agents additionally have reasonable suspicion that a person so detained is armed and dangerous, they may "frisk" the person for weapons, but not for contraband like drugs. However, the practice and legality of such actions vary widely across jurisdictions. If the agent develops probable cause during a weapons frisk (for example, by feeling something that could be a weapon or contraband), they may then conduct a full search. Reasonable suspicion is evaluated using the "reasonable person" or "reasonable officer" standard, in which said person in the same circumstances could reasonably suspect a person has been, is, or is about to be engaged in criminal activity; it depends upon the totality of circumstances, and can result from a combination of particular facts, even if each is individually innocuous.

== Precedent ==
In Terry v. Ohio, the U.S. Supreme Court ruled that a person can be stopped and briefly detained by a police officer based on a reasonable suspicion of involvement in a punishable crime. If the officer has reasonable suspicion the detainee is armed, the officer may perform a "pat-down" of the person's outer garments for weapons. Such a detention does not violate the Fourth Amendment prohibition on unreasonable searches and seizure, though it must be brief. Reasonable suspicion does not provide grounds for arrest; however, an arrest can be made if facts discovered during the detention provide probable cause that the suspect has committed a crime. However, probable cause cannot be after the fact. Any added probable cause after the fact would be inadmissible in a court of law.

In Hiibel v. Sixth Judicial District Court of Nevada the Court further established that a state may require, by law, that a person verbally identify himself or herself to an officer during a stop; some states (e.g., Colorado) require that a person detained provide additional information.

However, as of 2020, only 24 states have "stop and identify" statutes on the books.

== Other uses ==
=== Traffic stops ===
A brief, non-custodial traffic stop is considered a "seizure" for the purposes of the Fourth Amendment and must therefore be supported by reasonable suspicion or probable cause. The investigating officer must weigh the totality of the circumstances to determine whether sufficient objective facts exist to elicit reasonable suspicion that the driver is engaged in criminal activity. If the investigating officer witnesses the driver commit a traffic violation (even if they are mistaken about what constitutes a violation, see Heien v. North Carolina), then said violation generally constitutes probable cause for the officer to stop the vehicle. The officer may detain the driver and any passengers of the vehicle for long enough to confirm and/or deny their suspicions.

If the suspicions of the officer are confirmed, then there may be probable cause to either search the vehicle and/or arrest its occupant(s), depending on the nature of the suspected violations. In Illinois v. Caballes, the Supreme Court held that a drug dog may sniff the exterior of a vehicle during a traffic stop so long as any delay in calling the dog to the scene does not unreasonably prolong the traffic stop. The use of a drug dog is sui generis and a dog's sniff is not considered a search in and of itself under the Fourth Amendment.

Police may also set up roadblocks and stop drivers without particularized reasonable suspicion that the stopped individual is engaged in criminal activity, so long as the plan for the stop is applied neutrally, for instance, driving while intoxicated – so long as all vehicles are stopped or every third vehicle is stopped, or some other reasonably neutral policy is applied for stopping vehicles. Note that some states also impose additional notice requirements for roadblocks, such as appropriate signage and/or flashing blue or red lights.

=== Schools ===
New Jersey has set the precedent that probable cause is not necessary to search a student on school grounds; reasonable suspicion is enough to search a student's belongings. Overly intrusive searches, like a body cavity search, require probable cause.

=== Government workplaces ===
A few years after New Jersey v. T. L. O., the Supreme Court held in O'Connor v. Ortega that while government employees do have Fourth Amendment rights in the workplace, administrative investigations conducted by supervisors looking for evidence of work-related misconduct or violations of an employee policy – unlike investigations by law enforcement looking for evidence of criminal offenses – only require reasonable suspicion to justify a search.

=== Private workplaces ===
Many private employers also use reasonable suspicion in private workplaces to drug and alcohol test their employees. According to the Department of Transportation (DOT), employers must provide training to all persons who supervise drivers subject to the regulations, in accordance with §382.603. The purpose of this training is to enable supervisors to determine whether reasonable suspicion exists to require a driver or other safety-sensitive employee to undergo testing described in §382.307. The consequences of not completing the mandated minimum training can, at the least, result in fines and penalties and at the worst serious injuries and liability.

=== Borders ===
U.S. Customs can do routine suspicionless searches of people and effects crossing the border (including passing through airport customs) without establishing reasonable suspicion. This includes even complicated searches such as the disassembly of an automobile's gas tank. However, there are some more intrusive types of searches, such as body cavity searches of a suspect balloon swallower, that require reasonable suspicion.

=== Different jurisdictions ===
Most powers applied by police officers in the United Kingdom are done on reasonable suspicion. Unlike in the United States, police officers in England and Wales can arrest on reasonable suspicion.

=== Child abuse ===
Most state child abuse reporting laws employ the "reasonable suspicion" standard as the threshold above which mandated reporters must report the case. However, the definition of this term is not widely understood. As a result, there is large variation in the rates of child abuse reporting in different states.

== Examples ==
A police officer may briefly detain a person, without a warrant, if the officer has reasonable suspicion that the person is involved in a crime, and an officer may use reasonable force to effect that detention. Courts have recognized that an officer's safety is paramount and have allowed for a "frisk" of the outermost garments from head to toe if the officer reasonably suspects that the detainee is armed, and for an officer to stop an individual at gunpoint if necessary. In the city of New York, once a person is released from a reasonable suspicion stop, a "stop, question and frisk report" is filled out and filed with the command in which the stop occurs.

U.S. courts have held that a stop on reasonable suspicion may be appropriate in the following cases: when a person possesses unusual items (like a wire hanger, which would be useful in a crime, and is looking into car windows at 2 am), when a person matches a description of a suspect given by another officer, or a person is seen fleeing from a home or business with a sounding alarm. However, reasonable suspicion does not apply merely because a person refuses to answer questions, declines to allow a voluntary search, or is of a particular race or ethnicity.

== See also ==
- Reasonable doubt
- Stop and identify statutes (refusing to identify oneself when detained may be a crime in some jurisdictions)
- United States v. Arnold (searches and seizures of electronic media at a United States port of entry by Customs and Border Protection)
- Samson v. California (individualized reasonable suspicion is not required for searches to be conducted of the persons and homes of parolees)
- United States v. Cotterman (reasonable suspicion is required to subject a computer seized at the border to forensic examination)
