= Special needs exception =

Exception to the Fourth Amendment

The "special needs" exception is an exception to the Fourth Amendment’s general requirement that government searches be supported by a warrant and probable cause. The exception applies when (1) the government conducts programmatic searches that are primarily aimed at advancing some special need other than criminal law enforcement, and (2) the government’s search program is reasonable given the balance of public and private interests.

== Origin and history of the doctrine ==
The special needs doctrine was first articulated by Justice Blackmun in his New Jersey v. T. L. O. concurrence. There, Justice Blackmun explained that courts typically should not engage in a case-by-case balancing of Fourth Amendment interests. Rather, the framers already balanced public and private interests to determine that government searches presumptively must be supported by probable cause and a warrant to satisfy the Fourth Amendment’s reasonableness requirement. However, Justice Blackmun furthered that courts are entitled to engage in their own balancing of interests in “exceptional circumstances in which special needs, beyond the need for law enforcement, make the warrant and probable-cause requirement impracticable.” He explained that school searches—which were at issue in T.L.O.— present such special needs because student behavior that threatens the educational environment or safety of teachers and students often requires an immediate response. Not only would an immediate response be impossible if teachers needed to get a warrant before searching, but also teachers are “ill-equipped” to make probable cause determinations.

The Supreme Court subsequently adopted Justice Blackmun's “special needs” formulation in O'Connor v. Ortega. There, the Court upheld warrantless work-related searches of government employees’ desks and offices. Such searches implicated “special needs” because they were motivated by “legitimate work-related reasons wholly unrelated to illegal conduct,” such as the need to access a file or report while an employee is away. Thus, the Court balanced the interests at hand, determined that a warrant or probable cause requirement would be impracticable, and upheld the warrantless searches.

While the special needs doctrine was originally applied in the context of warrantless searches, it has since been used to uphold searches that are supported by no individualized suspicion whatsoever.

== Elements ==
=== Primary purpose ===
The threshold requirement for applying the special needs exception is that the search program's primary purpose must be “to serve special needs, beyond the normal need for law enforcement.” Because all law enforcement efforts are aimed at some greater societal objective, courts look to the search program's direct and immediate—not ultimate—purpose. For example, the Supreme Court upheld suspicionless drunk-driving checkpoints because they were directly aimed at removing immediate roadway safety-threats. In contrast, the Supreme Court invalidated vehicle checkpoints meant to interdict illegal drugs because those checkpoints were primarily aimed at catching drug offenders—a quintessential law-enforcement effort—rather than addressing some immediate safety concern.

To determine a search program's primary purpose, courts consider all available evidence. Such evidence may include law enforcement officers’ level of involvement in the program and the focus of any relevant written policy.

=== Reasonableness: balancing of interests ===
If a warrantless or suspicionless search program satisfies the threshold primary-purpose requirement, courts will then determine if the program is reasonable by balancing relevant interests. This analysis considers (1) the nature of the privacy interest, (2) the character of the privacy intrusion, and (3) the nature and immediacy of the government concerns, and the efficacy of the program for addressing them. Because the reasonableness inquiry is a holistic balancing test, a search program may be consistent with the Fourth Amendment even if it does not employ the least intrusive means that would serve the government's needs.

== Applications and related doctrines ==
=== Public schools ===
Under the special needs doctrine, the Supreme Court has upheld suspicionless drug tests of student athletes and student participants of other extracurricular activities. While “special needs inhere in the public school context,” this does not categorically exempt public schools searches from the warrant and probable cause requirement. Rather, courts still must engage in a case-by-case balancing of interests to determine whether a particular school search scheme is reasonable.

=== Administrative searches ===
In certain circumstances, the Supreme Court has also upheld warrantless administrative searches, such as when inspecting premises to determine the cause of fire damage or compliance with housing codes. Such administrative searches are sometimes discussed as part of the special needs exception and sometimes discussed as a separate “administrative search” exception.

=== Certain checkpoints ===
The Supreme Court has upheld suspicionless sobriety checkpoints and border patrol checkpoints under the special needs exception. Notably, the Supreme Court did not uphold the drug-interdiction checkpoint in City of Indianapolis v. Edmond, because that checkpoint was primarily aimed at ordinary law enforcement.

=== Other applications ===
Under the special needs doctrine, the Supreme Court has also upheld suspicionless drug tests of U.S. Customs Service employees seeking new positions, suspicionless drug and alcohol tests of railroad employees involved in prior accidents or safety violations, and warrantless work-related searches of government employees’ desks and offices.
