= TECS =

United States Homeland Security system

TECS, formerly known as the Treasury Enforcement Communications System, is used by the U.S. Department of Homeland Security to manage the flow of people through border ports of entry and for immigration enforcement case management. It keeps track of individuals entering and exiting the country and of individuals involved in or suspected to be involved in crimes. TECS alerts may be issued as part of Operation Angel Watch for people with sex offense convictions and those who travel frequently out of the country and who are possibly involved in child sex tourism.

== System evolution ==
=== Legacy TECS ===
Launched in 1970 by the U.S. Customs Service to support narcotics interdiction.

=== TECS II ===
A major architectural overhaul launched in 1987, which introduced the centralized mainframe query system still referenced in many modern records.

=== TECS Mod ===
Since 2008, DHS has been transitioning the platform from its 1980s-era mainframe to a high-availability, web-based cloud environment. While the backend has changed, many reports still carry the "TECS II" header for historical and procedural consistency.
