= List of United States Supreme Court cases, volume 431 =

This is a list of all the US Supreme Court cases from volume 431 of the United States Reports:

Case name	Citation	Date decided
United States Trust Co. of New York v. New Jersey	431 U.S. 1	1977
Blackledge v. Allison	431 U.S. 63	1977
Linmark Assocs., Inc. v. Willingboro	431 U.S. 85	1977
EPA v. Brown	431 U.S. 99	1977
Dixon v. Love	431 U.S. 105	1977
Kremens v. Bartley	431 U.S. 119	1977
Henderson v. Kibbe	431 U.S. 145	1977
Chappelle v. Greater Baton Rouge Airport Dist.	431 U.S. 159	1977
Texas v. Louisiana	431 U.S. 161	1977
Pressler v. Blumenthal	431 U.S. 169	1977
Ashcroft v. Mattis	431 U.S. 171	1977
United States v. Wong	431 U.S. 174	1977
United States v. Washington (1977)	431 U.S. 181	1977
Guam v. Olsen	431 U.S. 195	1977
Abood v. Detroit Board of Education	431 U.S. 209	1977
Douglas v. Seacoast Prods., Inc.	431 U.S. 265	1977
Smith v. United States (1977)	431 U.S. 291	1977
Massachusetts v. Westcott	431 U.S. 322	1977
Teamsters v. United States	431 U.S. 324	1977
E. Tex. Motor Freight Sys., Inc. v. Rodriguez	431 U.S. 395	1977
Connor v. Finch	431 U.S. 407	1977
Trainor v. Hernandez	431 U.S. 434	1977
Ohio Bureau of Emp. Serv. v. Hodory	431 U.S. 471	1977
Moore v. City of East Cleveland	431 U.S. 494	1977
United Air Lines, Inc. v. Evans	431 U.S. 553	1977
Scarborough v. United States	431 U.S. 563	1977
Ala. Power Co. v. Davis	431 U.S. 581	1977
Splawn v. California	431 U.S. 595	1977
United States v. Ramsey (1977)	431 U.S. 606	1977
Roberts v. Louisiana	431 U.S. 633	1977
Abney v. United States	431 U.S. 651	1977
Stencel Aero Eng'g Corp. v. United States	431 U.S. 666	1977
Carey v. Population Services International	431 U.S. 678	1977
Ill. Brick Co. v. Illinois	431 U.S. 720	1977
Ward v. Illinois	431 U.S. 767	1977
United States v. Lovasco	431 U.S. 783	1977
Lefkowitz v. Cunningham	431 U.S. 801	1977
Smith v. Org. of Foster Families	431 U.S. 816	1977
United States v. Larionoff	431 U.S. 864	
