= Carey v. Population Services International =

- Supreme Court of the United States

Argued January 10, 1977 Decided June 9, 1977
- Full case name: Hugh Carey, etc., et al. v. Population Services International, et al.
- Citations: 431 U.S. 678 (more) 97 S. Ct. 2010; 52 L. Ed. 2d 675

Case history
- Prior: Population Servs. Intl. v. Wilson, 398 F. Supp. 321 (S.D.N.Y. 1975); probable jurisdiction noted, 426 U.S. 918 (1976).

Holding
- The advertising restrictions contained in the Educations Laws in New York violated the First and Fourteenth Amendments.

Court membership
- Chief Justice Warren E. Burger Associate Justices William J. Brennan Jr. · Potter Stewart; Byron White · Thurgood Marshall; Harry Blackmun · Lewis F. Powell Jr. William Rehnquist · John P. Stevens

Case opinions
- Majority: Brennan, joined by Stewart, Marshall, Blackmun, Stevens (Parts I, II, III, V); White (Parts I, III, V); Powell (Part I)
- Plurality: Brennan, joined by Stewart, Marshall, Blackmun (Part IV)
- Concurrence: White
- Concurrence: Powell
- Concurrence: Stevens
- Dissent: Burger
- Dissent: Rehnquist

Laws applied
- U.S. Const. amends. I, XIV

Carey v. Population Services International, 431 U.S. 678 (1977), is a landmark decision of the U.S. Supreme Court in which the Court held that it was unconstitutional to prohibit anyone other than a licensed pharmacist to distribute nonprescription contraceptives to persons 16 years of age or over, to prohibit the distribution of nonprescription contraceptives by any adult to minors under 16 years of age, and to prohibit anyone, including licensed pharmacists, to advertise or display contraceptives.

The Court held that the Due Process Clause of the Fourteenth Amendment to the U.S. Constitution does not allow a state to intrude on an individual's decisions on matters of procreation which is protected as privacy rights.

== Background ==
The appellants were New York state officials whose job was to enforce the revisions of the Education Law, including then-governor Hugh Carey. The Education Law stated that it was a crime:

a) for any person to sell or distribute any contraceptive of any kind to a minor under the age of 16 years

b) for anyone other than a licensed pharmacist to distribute contraceptives to persons 16 or over

c) for anyone, including licensed pharmacists, to advertise or display contraceptives

The main appellee was Population Services International, a nonprofit corporation that spread birth control knowledge and services. Population Services International owned the North Carolina corporation Population Planning Associates, Inc. This corporation sold and advertised contraceptives to New York primarily through mail-order retail sale of nonmedical contraceptive devices from their offices in North Carolina which was a violation of the enforced Education Laws in New York at the time. Other appellees were:

a) Rev. James B. Hagen who was a minister and director of a venereal disease prevention program that gave out nonprescription contraceptive devices.

b) Physicians who specialized in family planning, pediatrics, and obstetrics-gynecology.

c) An adult resident of New York held that the current law hindered his ability to access nonprescription contraceptive devices and information and his freedom to distribute them to his minor children. The appellees challenged the constitutionality of NY CLS Educ § 6811. The District Court assented with the appellees and declared the law unconstitutional in respect to where it applied to nonprescription contraceptives and ordered it to be rephrased.

== Holding ==
The Supreme Court held that the advertising restrictions violated the First Amendment.

The Court further held that:

a) the prohibitions on the distribution of nonprescription contraceptives violated the Due Process Clause of Amendment XIV.

b) minors were entitled to the same constitutional protections as adults.

c) each state has somewhat broader authority to regulate the activities of children than of adults.

d) the protection of the right of privacy included the right of an individual, married or single, to be free of unwarranted governmental intrusion in the area of personal decisions regarding intimate relations.

== Majority opinion ==
In the Court vote, there were 7 votes for Population Services International and 2 votes against. Justice William Brennan delivered the majority opinion of the court in five parts in which it affirmed the determination by a three-judge District Court for the Southern District of New York. Only three other justices (Stewart, Marshall and Blackmun) joined his opinion in full, and the reasoning in Part IV of his opinion did not command a majority of the Court. The Court declared the New York Educ. Law § 6811(8)unconstitutional in its entirety under Amendment I and Amendment XIV where it applies to nonprescription contraceptives.

The majority concluded that:

Part I

Appellee Population Planning Associates, Inc. (PPA) has standing to challenge the Education Law in not only its own right, but also on behalf of its potential customers which was settled by Craig v. Boren, 429 U.S. 190 (1976). Craig held that PPA is among the vendors who have been permitted to resist efforts at restricting their operations by acting as advocates for the right of third parties who seek access to their market or function.

Part II

Regulations imposing a burden on a decision as fundamental as whether to bear or beget a child may be justified only by compelling state interests, and must be narrowly drawn to express only those interests.

Part III

The provision prohibiting distribution of nonprescription contraceptives to persons sixteen years or over except through licensed pharmacists clearly burdens the right of such individuals to use nonprescription contraceptives if they so desire. Moreover, the provision serves no convincing state interests. It cannot be justified by an interest in protecting health insofar as it applies to nonhazardous contraceptives or in protecting potential life. Nor can it be justified by a concern that young people not sell contraceptives. It cannot be categorized to serve as a quality control device or as enabling enforcement of the other provisions of the Education Law.

Part V

The prohibition of any advertisement or display of any contraceptives that seeks to suppress completely any information about the availability and price of contraceptives cannot be justified on the ground that advertisements of contraceptive products would offend and embarrass those exposed to them and that permitting them would legitimize sexual activity of young people. These are not justifications validating suppression of expression, which are protected by Amendment I. The advertisements in question simply state the availability of products that are not only entirely legal, but also constitutionally protected.

=== Plurality and concurring opinions ===
Part IV of Justice Brennan's opinion was a plurality opinion for four of the Justices, not joined by Justice Stevens.

Part IV

The right to privacy, which is protected by the Due Process Clause in Amendment XIV, in connection with decisions affecting procreation extends to minors as well as to adults, and since a state may not impose a blanket prohibition, or even a blanket requirement of parental consent, on the choice of a minor to terminate her pregnancy, the constitutionality of a blanket prohibition of the distribution of nonprescription contraceptives to minors is obviously illegal. Also, the argument that limiting exposure to advertisements of contraceptive products may discourage sexual activity has been rejected by the Court as a justification for restrictions on the freedom to choose whether to bear or beget a child.

Justices White, Powell and Stevens filed opinions concurring in parts of the Court's opinion and in the judgment.

== Dissenting opinion ==
Justice Rehnquist, who was one of the two Justices to vote against the appellees, filed a brief dissenting opinion in the case. He said the following:

a) no religious beliefs, compelled allegiance to a secular creed or a married couple's decision to procreate was considered in this court case.

b) New York’s purpose of the Education Laws was to discourage minors under the age of sixteen from having premarital sexual intercourse with each other.

c) Women are given the right to choose to get an abortion, and the Education Laws were a way of avoiding this practice by not exposing minors to advertisement of contraceptives which promotes promiscuous sex.

d) The Court denied a fundamental power of self-government when it held that New York may not use its police power to legislate in the interests of its concept of the public morality as it pertains to minors.

e) New York's law that all contraceptive medicines are required to be made by licensed pharmacists did not significantly limit the access to these products if a person has a concrete intention to obtain them.

Justice Rehnquist declined to debate Justice Brennan's treatment of the Court's previous opinions with respect to privacy rights because to do so would "concede more validity to the result reached by the Court than I am willing to do." He commented that if the Framers "could have lived to know that their efforts had enshrined in the Constitution the right of commercial vendors of contraceptives to peddle them to unmarried minors through such means as window displays and vending machines located in the men's room of truck stops, notwithstanding the considered judgment of the New York Legislature to the contrary, it is not difficult to imagine their reaction."

Chief Justice Burger dissented without opinion.

== Conclusion ==
Justice William Brennan held that it was unconstitutional to prohibit anyone other than a licensed pharmacist to distribute nonprescription contraceptives to persons 16 years of age or over, to prohibit the distribution of nonprescription contraceptives by any adult to minors under 16 years of age, and to prohibit anyone, including licensed pharmacists, to advertise or display contraceptives.

== Historical significance ==
As time goes by, and technology and medical developments continue, more forms of birth control are invented. Plan B became an over-the-counter back-up contraceptive, which raised the debate of whether it should also be available to minors in the same way. In Carey v. Population Services International the Court determined that minors have a right to privacy the same as adults. This also means that minors have protected privacy interests in their reproductive health decisions, which in the arguments over the availability of Plan B, minors have the right to be provided Plan B over-the-counter the same as adults.

In the debate over the woman's right to abortion, the right to privacy comes to play a role in the argument. Each case determines whether the right to privacy in the Due Process Clause of Amendment XIV is expanded to encompass a larger range of citizens. This current case determined that minors were included in the freedom given to a woman to bear a child. Some argue that the prohibition for the distribution of contraceptives to minors was simply a blanket prohibition for the state to avoid abortion which it could not flatly make a law.

== Related cases ==
The Court held that a right in the US Constitution that was used in favor of the appellees in the case was the right to privacy, and that it is protected by the Due Process Clause of Amendment XIV. The court had held that the protection of the right of privacy included the right of an individual, married or single, to be free of unwarranted governmental intrusion in the area of personal decisions regarding intimate relations. Future cases dealing with personal decisions concerning intimate relations that also used this defense were:

a) Lawrence v. Texas 539 U.S. 558 (2003) which challenged the Texas act that made it a crime for two persons of the same sex to participate in certain intimate sexual conduct. As in Carey v. Population Services International, the appellees used the right of privacy to state that the law was unconstitutional since citizens are entitled to respect for their private lives. This led to the Court holding criminal convictions for adult consensual sexual conduct in the home violated liberty and privacy interests protected by the Due Process Clause of the Amendment XIV.

b) Planned Parenthood v. Casey 505 U.S. 833 (1992), which challenged the husband notification provision of the Pennsylvania Abortion Control Act that put an undue burden on a woman's right to have an abortion. In this case, the holdings balanced both the individual's rights, and the power of the state to intervene in respect to right of privacy. A state has the power to prohibit abortions after fetal viability, as long as the law holds exceptions for pregnancies, which endanger a women's life or health, but the case also retained and reaffirmed the right of privacy, which were determined in Griswold v. Connecticut (1965) and affirmed in the holding of Roe v Wade 410 U.S. 113 (1973).

Another topic in the case was the prohibition of advertising suppressing commercial speech about any contraceptive device. The Court held that such speech is protected by Amendment I AND may not be prohibited because it concerns subjects offending the public's sensibilities. Future cases dealing with the prohibition of advertising suppressing commercial speech freedoms were:

a) Reno v. ACLU 521 U.S. 844 (1997) which challenged the Communications Decency Act of 1996 which criminalized the constitutionally-protected indecent speech as well as unprotected obscene speech. The court held that the law violated Amendment I by restricting the freedom of speech.

b) Central Hudson Gas & Electric Corp. v. Public Service Commission 447 U.S. 557 (1980) which challenged a public service commission's regulation banning promotional advertising by an electric utility. The Court held that the regulation was a violation of Amendment I because the state interest in ensuring fair and efficient utility rates was not sufficiently linked to the ban. In the case of the electric company, the public service commission's concern over the equality and efficiency of utility rates did not provide a constitutionally acceptable reason for restricting protected speech. The ban on all promotional advertising by the company violated both Amendment I in respect to the freedom of speech, and the Amendment XIV in regards to the Due Process Clause.
