= United States Trust Co. of New York v. New Jersey =

United States Trust Co. v. New Jersey
- Supreme Court of the United States

Argued November 10, 1976 Decided April 27, 1977
- Full case name: United States Trust Company of New York v. New Jersey
- Citations: 431 U.S. 1 (more) 97 S. Ct. 1505; 52 L. Ed. 2d 92

Case history
- Prior: Complaint for declaratory relief dismissed, United States Trust Co. v. State, 134 N.J. Super. 124, 338 A.2d 833 (1975); affirmed, US Trust Co. of New York v. State, 69 N.J. 253, 353 A.2d 514 (1976).
- Subsequent: None

Holding
- The retroactive repeal of a statutory covenant that protected Port Authority bondholders violated the Contract Clause. An impairment of a state's own financial obligations is unconstitutional if it is not both reasonable and necessary to serve an important public purpose.

Court membership
- Chief Justice Warren E. Burger Associate Justices William J. Brennan Jr. · Potter Stewart; Byron White · Thurgood Marshall; Harry Blackmun · Lewis F. Powell Jr. William Rehnquist · John P. Stevens

Case opinions
- Majority: Blackmun, joined by Burger, Rehnquist, Stevens
- Concurrence: Burger
- Dissent: Brennan, joined by White, Marshall
- Stewart, Powell took no part in the consideration or decision of the case.

Laws applied
- U.S. Constitution, Art. I, § 10, cl. 1

United States Trust Co. of New York v. New Jersey, 431 U.S. 1 (1977), was a United States Supreme Court case in which the court held that the retroactive repeal of a statutory covenant that protected Port Authority bondholders violates the Contract Clause. An impairment of a state's own financial obligations is unconstitutional if it is not both reasonable and necessary to serve an important public purpose. The case was a major reiteration of the Contract Clause's importance after a long period in which it was largely ignored by the court.

== Background ==
A 1962 statutory covenant between New Jersey and New York limited the ability of the Port Authority of New York and New Jersey to subsidize rail passenger transportation from revenues and reserves pledged as security for consolidated bonds issued by the Port Authority. A 1974 New Jersey statute, together with a concurrent and parallel New York statute, retroactively repealed the 1962 covenant. The United States Trust Company of New York, both as a trustee for and as a holder of Port Authority bonds, brought suit in the New Jersey Superior Court for declaratory relief, claiming that the 1974 New Jersey statute impaired the obligation of the States' contract with the bondholders in violation of the Contract Clause of the United States Constitution. The Superior Court dismissed the complaint after trial, holding that the statutory repeal was a reasonable exercise of New Jersey's police power and was not prohibited by the Contract Clause. The New Jersey Supreme Court affirmed.

== Opinion of the court ==
The Supreme Court issued an opinion on April 27, 1977. The Supreme Court reversed the lower courts and held by a 4-3 vote that the repeal of the 1962 covenant violated the Contract Clause. Justice Harry Blackmun wrote the majority opinion, joined by Chief Justice Warren Burger and Justices William Rehnquist and John Paul Stevens. Justices William Brennan, Thurgood Marshall, and Byron White dissented. Justices Potter Stewart and Lewis Powell recused themselves.

== See also ==
- Fletcher v. Peck (1810)
- Dartmouth College v. Woodward (1819)
- Home Building & Loan Assn. v. Blaisdell (1934)
