= Child sex tourism =

Tourism for engaging child prostitution

Child sex tourism (CST) is tourism for the purpose of engaging in the prostitution of children, which is commercially facilitated child sexual abuse. The definition of child in the United Nations Convention on the Rights of the Child is "every human being below the age of 18 years". Child sex tourism results in both mental and physical consequences for the exploited children, which may include sexually transmitted infections (including HIV/AIDS), "drug addiction, pregnancy, malnutrition, social ostracism, and death", according to the State Department of the United States. Child sex tourism, part of the multibillion-dollar global sex tourism industry, is a form of child prostitution within the wider issue of commercial sexual exploitation of children. Child sex tourism victimizes approximately 2 million children around the world. The children who perform as prostitutes in the child sex tourism trade often have been lured or abducted into sexual slavery.

Users of children for commercial and sexual purposes can be categorized by motive. Although pedophiles are popularly associated with child sex tourism, they are not the majority of users. There are two types of offenders: preferential abusers who specifically prefer children, because they seek to build a relationship with a child or because they perceive the risk of sexually transmitted infections to be lower; and situational users, which are abusers who do not actively seek out children but for whom the actual act is opportunistic. For situational users, there may be a lack of concern to check the age of a prostitute before engaging in sexual activity.

Travelling child sex offenders can use the Internet to plan their trips by seeking and exchanging information about opportunities for child sex tourism and locations where vulnerable children may be found, often in low-income areas. Multiple governments have enacted laws allowing the prosecution of their citizens for child sexual abuse committed abroad. While such laws may deter situational offenders who act impulsively, individuals who travel specifically to exploit children are less likely to be dissuaded.

== Background ==
Child sex tourism has been closely linked to poverty, armed conflicts, rapid industrialization, and exploding population growth. In Latin America and Southeast Asia, for instance, street children often turn to prostitution as a last resort. Additionally, vulnerable children are easy targets for exploitation by traffickers. Also, child victim ages have been found in Cambodia, Myanmar, the Philippines, and Thailand to range from 6 to 11 years old, followed by 12 to 15 years old, and 15 to 17.

In 2012, the Special Rapporteur on the sale of children, child prostitution and child pornography reported: "Countries of origin of international child sex tourists vary depending on the regions, but the demand is usually recognized as coming from the industrialized countries, including the richer countries of Europe, North America, the Russian Federation, Japan, Australia and New Zealand.

Australians, for instance, have been identified as the largest group of sex tourists prosecuted in Thailand (31 percent of the total). Of the 146 cases investigated by Action Pour Les Enfants (APLE) in Cambodia between 2003 and April 2012, 32 were American, 24 French and 20 Vietnamese. In the coastal regions of Kenya, for example, 30 percent were residents and 70 percent of the abusers were foreign: Italians (18 percent), Germans (14 percent), Swiss (12 percent). Tourists coming from Uganda and the United Republic of Tanzania were fifth and sixth on the list. In Costa Rica, according to available information, between the 1999 and 2005, the Child Exploitation Unit had arrested a total of 74 persons on suspicion of commercial sexual exploitation of children. Of those arrested, 56 were Costa Rican nationals and 18 foreign nationals".

In Thailand, the exact number of child prostitutes is not known, but Thailand's Health System Research Institute reports that children in prostitution make up 40% of prostitutes in Thailand. In Cambodia, it has been estimated that about a third of all prostitutes are under 18. In India, the federal police say that around 1.2 million children are believed to be involved in prostitution. Up until circa 2012, Brazil has been considered to have the worst child sex trafficking record after Thailand. As per Chris Rogers’ report on BBC World, "Now Brazil is overtaking Thailand as the world's most popular sex-tourist destination". DLN reports that "Brazil at the moment is on a high trend of child sex tourism and is all geared to take up the first spot beating out Thailand."

Sex tourism targeting children creates huge monetary incentives for traffickers. Human trafficking impacts an estimated 1.2 million child victims. In 2009 the United Nations Office of Drugs and Crimes (UNODC) stated that 79% of all global trafficking is for sexual exploitation, which is one of the fastest growing criminal activities in the world.

UNICEF notes that sexual activity is often seen as a private matter, making communities reluctant to act and intervene in cases of sexual exploitation. These attitudes make children far more vulnerable to sexual exploitation. Most exploitation of children takes place as a result of their absorption into the adult sex trade where they are exploited by local people and sex tourists. The Internet provides an efficient global networking tool for individuals to share information on destinations and procurement.

In cases involving children, the U.S. has relatively strict domestic laws that hold accountable any American citizen or permanent resident of the U.S. who travels abroad for the purpose of engaging in illicit conduct with a minor. However, child pornography, sex tourism and human trafficking remain fast-growing industries. In September 2009 New Jersey Republican representative Chris Smith introduced H.R. 1623, the International Megan's Law. Similar to the domestic Megan's Law (named after Megan Kanka of New Jersey), which provides for community notification when a sex offender is living in the area, H.R. 1623 would alert officials abroad when U.S. sex offenders intend to travel, and likewise encourage other countries to keep sex offender lists and to notify the U.S. when a known sex offender may be coming to the United States for sex tourism. While there are serious problems with the sex offender registries in the United States, human rights organizations such as ECPAT and UNICEF believe this would be a step in the right direction.

== Webcam child sex tourism ==
According to the Federal Bureau of Investigation estimate, there are 750,000 predators online at any given time in 40,000 public chat rooms. Offers from 20,000 internet users to pay for webcam sex performances were found in a 10-week investigation conducted from a warehouse in Amsterdam, in the Terre des hommes Dutch action against WCST, using "Sweetie", a 3D computer model. Out of 21,000 perpetrators, 1,000 were identified from Australia, Canada, Jamaica, Germany, Ghana, India, Italy, Mauritius, the Netherlands, South Africa, Turkey, the United Kingdom, and the United States. 110 of the alleged online abusers were based in the UK and another 254 were traced to computers in the US. Together with Avaaz.org, Terre des Hommes Netherlands has created an online petition to pressure governments to adopt proactive investigation policies in order to protect children against webcam child sex tourism.

== Global response ==
In recent years there has been an increase in the prosecution of child sex tourism offenses. At least 38 countries have extraterritorial laws that allow their citizens to be prosecuted specifically for child sexual abuse crimes committed while abroad, and another 31 nations have more general extraterritorial laws that could be used to prosecute their citizens for crimes committed during child sex tourism trips. As of May 2016, 173 countries have signed and ratified the Optional Protocol on the Sale of Children, Child Prostitution and Children Pornography which is "Deeply concerned at the widespread and continuing practice of sex tourism, to which children are especially vulnerable". It also obliges parties to pass laws within their own territories against these practices "punishable by appropriate penalties that take into account their grave nature". In response to CST, non-governmental organizations (NGOs), the tourism industry, and governments have begun to address the issue. The World Tourism Organization (WTO) established a task force to combat CST. The WTO, ECPAT (End Child Prostitution, Child Pornography and Trafficking of Children for Sexual Purposes) and Nordic tour operators created a global Code of Conduct for the Sexual Exploitation of Children in Travel and Tourism in Travel and Tourism in 1996. As of April 2013, over 1200 travel companies from 40 countries had signed the code.

== International law enforcement activities ==
The United States' Homeland Security Investigations participates in investigating and capturing child sex tourists. In 2003 ICE launched "Operation Predator", leading to the arrest of over 11,000 child sexual abusers, including more than 1,100 outside the United States. While ICE agents refuse to comment on their means and methods of operation, media reports have suggested the use of undercover agents, internet sting operations, and sophisticated technologies. ICE agents in Bangkok did say however that they often receive information from local NGOs about foreigners in Thailand whom they suspect of engaging in child sexual abuse. Sometimes U.S. based law enforcement, such as local sheriffs' departments and parole officers, inform them of known sex offenders who are traveling to the region. In both cases, local ICE agents work with their Royal Thai Police counterparts to monitor the suspects’ movements while in Thailand. The UK police and the Child Exploitation and Online Protection Centre (CEOP) are actively involved in monitoring child sex tourists and do prosecute. INTERPOL actively pursues offenders as well.

== Policing of child sex tourism ==
=== Asia ===
- Cambodia: The Trafficking in Persons Report of 2010 reports that the sale of virgin girls continues to be a serious problem in Cambodia, and that a significant number of Asian and other foreign men travel to Cambodia to engage in child sex tourism. Cambodia's 1996 Law on Suppression of the Kidnapping, Trafficking, and Exploitation of Human Persons contains legislation against the commercial sexual exploitation of children, and while the law focuses largely on trafficking, it also addresses prostitution. The age of consent in Cambodia is 15, and the law does not specifically define or prohibit the prostitution of children. It is estimated that 1/3 of prostitutes in Cambodia are children.
- China: The Trafficking in Persons Report of 2010 reports that the government of China did not take sufficient measures to reduce demand for forced labor, commercial sex acts, or child sex tourism.
- Indonesia: The Trafficking in Persons Report of 2010 reports that child sex tourism is prevalent in most urban areas and tourist destinations, such as Bali and Riau Island in Indonesia. Recently, islands of Indonesia like Bali and Batam have become known for child sex tourism. These islands have also been destinations for sex trafficking. Under a Criminal Code in Indonesia, any Indonesian citizen can be punished for violating the Child Protection Act or the Criminal Code, whether it is inside Indonesia or outside. The Child Protect Act 28 is a general act to protect the rights of children. A few specific sections provide laws specific to sexual mistreatment of children. One law states that it is illegal to use a child for personal or commercial monetary gain. If one does not follow this law, the punishment can be up to ten years in jail and/ or a monetary fine of 200 million rupiahs which is equivalent to $22,000 US.
- South Korea: South Korean men have been major drivers of child sex tourism in Asia for some time. In 2005, The Korea Times reported that an international symposium was held to talk about strategies for curbing the high numbers of Korean child sex tourists to southeast Asia. The symposium, "Conditions and Countermeasures to Overseas Child and Youth Sex Tourism by Korean Men" discussed issues concerning Korean male soliciting of child prostitutes across Asia, but Cambodia and The Philippines were especially worrisome. "[Panelists] said male Korean tourists are believed to abuse the unfortunate situation of poor Cambodian children," who are coerced into selling sexual favors in order to help their families. As for the Philippines, the report noted, "An increasing number of Koreans bought sex in the Philippines, sometimes abusing prostitutes. The Philippine government has urged the Korean government to take firm action against soliciting prostitutes, in particular buying sex from children." The Trafficking in Persons Report of 2019 reports that the men of South Korea engage in child sex tourism in Cambodia, China, Mongolia, the Philippines, and Vietnam. Technology such as the internet has helped increase accessibility of child sex tourism in the Republic of Korea. Some South Korean men arrange for children from the Philippines, Thailand, and China as sources of sex. A Korean Institute of Criminology study published in January 2013 shows that South Korean men are the primary market for child sex tourism in Southeast Asia. "Among foreigners visiting Southeast Asia, South Koreans are the majority group driving demand for child prostitution across the region." The article goes on to say, "A 2008 report from the U.S. Department of State, 'Trafficking in Persons Report,' described South Korea as a significant source of demand for child sex tourism in Southeast Asia and the Pacific Islands." Yun Hee-jun, head of a Seoul-based group campaigning against sex trafficking, claims, "If you visit any brothel in Vietnam or Cambodia, you can see fliers written in Korean." Although South Korea has legislation in place to prosecute Korean nationals who are child sex offenders abroad, a 2014 report stated "The government has not prosecuted or convicted any Korean sex tourists during the past seven years".
- Laos: Lao Penal Law, Article 131 states: "Human trafficking means the recruitment, moving, transfer, harbouring, or receipt of any person within or across national borders by means of deception, threats, use of force, debt bondage or any other means [and using such person in] forced labour, prostitution, pornography, or anything that is against the fine traditions of the nation, or removing various body organs [of such person], or for other unlawful purposes. Any of the above-mentioned acts committed against children under 18 years of age shall be considered as human trafficking even though there is no deception, threat, use of force, or debt bondage. Any person engaging in human trafficking shall be punished by five years to fifteen years of imprisonment and shall be fined from 10,000,000 Kip to 100,000,000 Kip". Lao Law on Development and Protection of Women, Article 24 states: "If these acts are committed against children under 18 years old, then even though there is no deception, threat, force, or debt bondage, trafficking shall be regarded to have occurred. Any individual who co-operates with the offender [who commits] an offence mentioned above[,] whether by incitement, providing assets or vehicles to the offender, the provision of shelter, or the concealment or removal of traces of an infraction, shall be considered as an accomplice in trafficking in women and children". According to a 2008 US state department report: "Police corruption, a weak judicial sector and the population’s general lack of understanding of the court system impeded anti-trafficking law enforcement efforts...Corruption remained a problem with government officials susceptible to involvement or collusion in trafficking in persons."
- Mongolia: The Trafficking in Persons Report of 2010 reports that South Korean and Japanese tourists engage in child sex tourism in Mongolia. The Mongolian government has implemented laws regarding child prostitution. The Criminal Code bans organized prostitution of anyone under the age of 16, the age of sexual consent in Mongolia. Not only is prostitution of anyone under the age of 16 illegal, sex with a person under the age of 16 is illegal as well. Not complying with this law could lead to three years in jail or eighteen months of community service. Rape is also illegal in Mongolia, with the punishment of two to six years in prison. If there are repeated violations or injury to victims these punishments are intensified.
- Philippines: Child sex tourism is known as a serious problem in the Philippines. The Trafficking in Persons Report of 2010 reports of tourists coming from Northeast Asia, Australia, Europe and North America to engage in sex with children. With new technology like the internet, some children form cyber relationships with men from other countries and get money by sending pornographic images over the internet.
- Thailand: Both governmental organizations and nongovernmental organizations have worked together to shut down brothels. They have also tried to increase awareness of child sex tourism and made attempts to stop it. In 2008, records of 27,000 woman and children were reported as seeking medical treatment from injuries relating to sexual abuse. Many children are not registered at birth in Thailand, allowing them more easily to be trafficked to other countries and forced into child labor, including sexual exploitation.

=== North America ===
- Barbados: There has been no noticeable action taken by the government of Barbados to reduce the demand for commercial sex acts, though public commentary on the problem of sex tourism, including child sex tourism, has been increasing.
- Dominican Republic: Some reports say that child sex tourism is a current problem, particularly in coastal resort areas, with child sex tourists arriving year-round from various countries. It is also reported that the current legislation has inconsistencies and gaps which could obstruct the interpretation and application of the legislation. The Code for the Protection of the Rights of Children and Adolescents, Law 136-03 conceptualizes crime of using children and adolescents in paid sexual activity. Only certain modes of production and dissemination of pornographic material are seen as criminal activities, while possession of child pornography is sanctioned.
- Cuba: The Trafficking in Persons Report of 2010 reports that the government of Cuba has made no known efforts to reduce the demand for commercial sex. Additionally, it is reported that the government does not acknowledge any child sex tourism problem but has recently banned children under 16 from nightclubs. According to Cuban government documents, training was provided to those in the tourism industry on how to identify and report potential sex tourists.
- El Salvador: One-third of the sexually exploited children between 14 and 17 years of age are boys. The median age for entering into prostitution among all children interviewed was 13 years. They worked an average of five days per week, although nearly 10% reported that they worked seven days a week. Recently, the problem has increased, especially due to migration. Many children are lied to with promises of jobs, and are abducted and sent to countries in North America by foreigners from Mexico or neighboring countries. Most victims are Salvadoran children from rural areas who are forced into commercial sexual exploitation in urban areas.

The Government of El Salvador does not fully comply with the minimum standards for the elimination of trafficking, but is making significant efforts to do so. During the reporting period, the government sustained anti-trafficking law enforcement efforts and continued to provide services to children who were trafficked for sexual exploitation. The Salvadoran government sustained anti-trafficking prevention efforts during the reporting period. The government forged or continued partnerships with NGOs, international organizations, and foreign governments on anti-trafficking initiatives. In May 2009, the government collaborated with an NGO to launch a campaign aimed specifically at increasing awareness of the commercial sexual exploitation of children, reaching approximately 4,500 children and adults. The government included anti-trafficking information in the training it gives to military forces prior to their deployment for international peacekeeping missions.

- Jamaica: The Trafficking in Persons Report of 2010 reports that NGOs (Nongovernmental Organizations) and local observers state that there is a child sex tourism problem near Jamaica's resort areas.
- Trinidad and Tobago: According to the governments of Trinidad and Tobago, there were no reports nor prosecutions related to child sex tourism.

=== South America ===
- Argentina: The US Department of State reported that child sex tourism is a problem in Argentina, especially on the border and in Buenos Aires. The Argentinean penal code does not specifically prohibit child sex tourism. and there were not any child sex related prosecutions in 2009–2010. Hoping to reduce child sex tourism, governmental authorities passed a law commanding law enforcement to seek the closure of all brothels NGOs reported. This is not effective because brothels are often tipped off by local police before the raids.
- Brazil: The US Department of State reported that child sex tourism remains a serious problem, particularly in tourist areas in Brazil's northeast. Most child sex tourists come from Europe, and some come from the United States. Brazilian authorities are not directly involved with prosecuting sex tourists and instead allow NGOs to prosecute those participating in child sex tourism. A Brazilian law newly introduced in 2000, states, "to submit a child or adolescent, as defined in the caput of article 2 (children: people younger than 12 years; adolescents: people between 12 and 18), prostitution or sexual exploitation is punishable by imprisonment for four to ten years and a fine."
- Colombia: Article 219 of the Colombian criminal code prohibits, "organizing or facilitating sexual tourism and provides penalties of 3 to 8 years’ imprisonment", but there were no reported prosecutions or convictions of child sex tourists. In recent years, Colombia has strengthened legislation related to control trafficking of children, particularly to follow the criminal code. However, a law is still pending approval by the Code for Children and Adolescents, which includes the rights and guarantees of children and adolescent victims of commercial sexual exploitation.
- Ecuador: Child sex tourism occurs mostly in urban areas, and in tourist destinations, such as the city of Tena and the Galapagos Islands.
- Peru: Child sex tourism is present in Iquitos, Madre de Dios, and Cuzco. Traffickers reportedly operate illegally in certain regions where governmental authority lacks. Although some areas of the country are known child sex tourism destinations and Peruvian laws prohibit this practice, there were no reported convictions of child sex tourists. The government trained 710 government officials and tourism service providers about child sex tourism, conducted a public awareness campaign on the issue, and reached out to the tourism industry to raise awareness about child sex tourism; to date, 60 businesses have signed code of conduct agreements nationwide.
- Uruguay: Government officials maintained efforts to reach out to hotel workers and to others in the broader tourism sector to raise awareness about child sex tourism and the commercial sexual exploitation of children. Uruguay's educational system continues to include trafficking education to high schools.

== Extraterritorial jurisdiction ==
A growing number of countries have specific extraterritorial legislation that prosecutes their citizens in their homeland should they engage in illicit sexual conduct in a foreign country with children. In 2008, ECPAT reported that 44 countries had extraterritorial child sex legislation. The following list includes specific citations:

=== Australia ===
Australia was one of the first countries to introduce laws that provide for jail terms for its citizens and residents who engage in sexual activity with children in foreign countries. The laws are contained in the Crimes (Child Sex Tourism) Amendment Act 1994 that came into force on 5 July 1994. The law also makes it an offence to encourage, benefit or profit from any activity that promotes sexual activity with children.

It is a crime for Australian citizens, permanent residents or bodies corporate to engage in, facilitate or benefit from sexual activity with children (under 16 years of age) while overseas. These offences carry penalties of up to 25 years imprisonment for individuals and up to $500,000 in fines for companies.

=== Canada ===
Canada has included in its Criminal Code provisions that allow for the arrest and prosecution of Canadians in Canada for offences committed in foreign countries related to child sex tourism, such as child prostitution, as well as for child sexual exploitation offences, such as indecent acts, child pornography and incest (Bills C-27 and C-15A that came into force on May 26, 1997, and July 23, 2002, respectively). Convictions carry a penalty of up to 14 years imprisonment.

=== Hong Kong ===
In Hong Kong, the Prevention of Child Pornography Ordinance (Cap. 579) of December 2003 introduced offences in regard to child sex tourism, giving extraterritorial effect to 24 sexual offences listed in a new Schedule 2 to the Crime Ordinance (Cap. 200). This makes it illegal for acts committed against a child outside Hong Kong if the defendant or the child has connections with Hong Kong. It is also an offence to make any arrangement relating to the commission of such acts against children and to advertise any such arrangement.

=== Ireland ===
In Ireland, the Criminal Law (Sexual Offences) Act 2017 gives worldwide jurisdiction to prosecutors when pursuing Irish born offenders through the courts on criminal charges in relation to the sexual exploitation of children, with offences such as sexual acts with a child or producing child pornography being treated as if having been committed in Ireland itself no matter what country it actually occurred in.

=== Israel ===
Israeli Penal Code, Chapter 1, Section 15, states that Israeli penal law shall apply to foreign offenses, whether felony or misdemeanor, which are committed by an Israeli citizen or resident of Israel, without exception, in cases relating to Chapter VIII, Article X (Prostitution and Obscenity) regarding minors.

Section 203B under Article X are penal laws regarding the exploitation of minors for prostitution by way of pimping and trafficking.

Section 203C under the same article is a penal law specific to the client: "A person served by an act of prostitution of a minor, shall be liable to three years imprisonment."

As of February 2016, section 203C is in the process of amendment to increase imprisonment from three years to five years.

=== Japan ===
The 1999 Law for Punishing Acts Related to Child Prostitution and Child Pornography, and for Protection of Children stipulates "that a person who is involved in child prostitution, who sells child pornographic products or who transports foreign children to another country for the purpose of forcing them into prostitution shall be punished with imprisonment with labor or a fine. Japanese nationals who commit such crimes abroad shall be punished with the same penalty".

=== New Zealand ===
Under The Crimes Amendment Act 2005 "...it is an offence: For New Zealand citizens and residents to engage in sexual conduct or activities with a child in another country".

=== Russia ===
Criminal Code of Russia, Article 12 states "The Operation of Criminal Law in Respect of Persons Who Have Committed Offences Outside the Boundaries of the Russian Federation[:] 1. Citizens of the Russian Federation and stateless persons permanently residing in the Russian Federation who have committed outside the Russian Federation a crime against the interests guarded by the present Code shall be subject to criminal liability in accordance with the present Code, unless a decision of a foreign state's court exists concerning this crime in respect of these persons".

Federal Act No. 380-FZ of 28 December 2013 amended the Criminal Code by also adding laws regarding the receiving of sexual services from a minor. Under the amended article 240.1 of the Criminal Code, "The receipt of sexual services from a minor aged from 16 to 18 by a person who has reached the age of 18 is punishable by up to 240 hours of compulsory work, or restriction of freedom for up to 2 years, or forced labour for up to 4 years, or deprivation of liberty for the same period. In this article, sexual services are understood to mean sexual intercourse, sodomy, lesbianism or other acts of a sexual nature, a condition of the performance of which is monetary or any other remuneration of a minor or third party or the promise of remuneration of a minor or third party".

Article 240.3 (amended by Federal Act No. 14-FZ of February 29, 2012) states "The deeds provided for by Parts One and Two of this Article which are committed with the involvement in prostitution of persons who are to be under 14 years old – Shall be punishable by deprivation of liberty for a term of three to 10 years with or without deprivation of the right to hold definite offices or to engage in definite activities for a term of up to fifteen years and with restriction of liberty for a term of from one year to two years or without such".

=== Singapore ===
Singapore Penal Code, Section 376C (Commercial sex with minor under 18 outside Singapore) states: "(1) Any person, being a citizen or a permanent resident of Singapore, who does, outside Singapore, any act that would, if done in Singapore, constitute an offence under section 376B, shall be guilty of an offence".

=== Switzerland ===
Swiss Federal Office of Police state "Swiss federal authorities have stepped up their efforts in fighting child sex tourism in recent years. A special fedpol unit dealing with child pornography and pedocriminality offences co-operates closely with numerous partner services both at home and abroad. Since June 2008, an online form has been available to the general public to report cases of child sex tourism to the appropriate judicial authorities".

Swiss Criminal Code Article 5 3. (Territorial scope of application / Offences against minors abroad) states: "1 This Code also applies to any person who is in Switzerland, is not being extradited and has committed any of the following offences abroad: abis.3 sexual acts with dependent persons (Art. 188) and sexual acts with minors against payment (Art. 196); b. sexual acts with children (Art. 187) if the victim was less than 14 years of age;".

Article 296 3. (Exploitation of sexual acts / Sexual acts with minors against payment) Amended 27 September 2013, states: "Any person who carries out sexual acts with a minor or induces a minor to carry out such acts and who makes or promises payment in return is liable to a custodial sentence not exceeding three years or to a monetary penalty".

Article 187 1. (Endangering the development of minors / Sexual acts with children) states: "1. Any person who engages in a sexual act with a child under 16 years of age, or, incites a child to commit such an activity, or involves a child in a sexual act, is liable to a custodial sentence not exceeding five years or to a monetary penalty. 2. The act is not an offence if the difference in age between the persons involved is not more than three years."

=== South Korea ===
Under The Act on the Protection of Children and Juveniles from Sexual Abuse, Article 33 (Punishment of Korean Citizens who Commit Offenses Overseas) states: "Where criminally prosecuting a Korean citizen who commits a sex offense against a child or juvenile outside the territory of the Republic of Korea, pursuant to Article 3 of the Criminal Act, the State shall endeavor to obtain criminal information swiftly from the relevant foreign country and punish such offender". According to a 2012 ECPAT report "progress is needed with regard to the enforcement of extraterritorial jurisdiction concerning nationals who have sex with children abroad... depending on which South Korean law is being applied, the definition of "child" varies...These varying definitions create uncertainty as to how the various laws will be applied and invite a lack of cooperation or lack of uniformity in enforcement by multiple agencies"

=== United Kingdom ===
The Sexual Offences Act 2003 enables British citizens and residents who commit sexual offences against children overseas to be prosecuted in England, Wales and Northern Ireland. Similar provisions are in force in Scotland under the Criminal Law (Consolidation) (Scotland) Act 1995. Some of the offences carry penalties of up to life imprisonment and anyone found guilty will be placed on the Sex Offenders Register. As of 2013, two British citizens are in jail following trials based on this legislation: Barry McCloud and David Graham.

=== United States ===
Under the PROTECT Act of April 2003, it is a federal crime, prosecutable in the United States, for a U.S. citizen or permanent resident alien, to engage in illicit sexual conduct in a foreign country with a person under the age of 18, whether or not the U.S. citizen or lawful permanent resident alien intended to engage in such illicit sexual conduct prior to going abroad. For purposes of the PROTECT Act, illicit sexual conduct includes any commercial sex act in a foreign country with a person under the age of 18. The law defines a commercial sex act as any sex act, on account of which anything of value is given to or received by a person under the age of 18. Before congressional passage of the Protect Act of 2003, prosecutors had to prove that sex tourists went abroad with the intent of molesting children—something almost impossible to demonstrate. The Protect Act shifted the burden, making predators liable for the act itself. Penalties were doubled from up to 15 years in prison to up to 30 years in prison.

=== European Union ===
Under the European Directive 2011/93/EU of 13 December 2011 on combating the sexual abuse and sexual exploitation of children and child pornography, (Note: Directive 2011/93/EU of the European Parliament and of the Council of 13 December 2011 on combating the sexual abuse and sexual exploitation of children and child pornography, and replacing Council Framework Decision 2004/68/JHA: "Article 17 (Jurisdiction and coordination of prosecution): 1. Member States shall take the necessary measures to establish their jurisdiction over the offences referred to in Articles 3 to 7 where: (a) the offence is committed in whole or in part within their territory; or (b) the offender is one of their nationals.") Member States have to prosecute their citizens for child sex offences committed abroad. By 2015, most Member States have implemented this directive.

A proposed revision of the Directive is under consideration as of August 2026.
