= Operation Predator =

Child pornography crackdowns in the USA

Operation Predator is an initiative started on July 9, 2003, by U.S. Immigration and Customs Enforcement (ICE), a division of the Department of Homeland Security, to protect children from sexual predators.

Operation Predator targets foreign national sex offenders (deportable aliens), child traffickers, child-sex tourists, and people involved in all levels of child pornography, form producers to distributors to consumers.

As of 2016, there have been over 13,000 arrests under Operation Predator. Over 1,000 of those arrests occurred within the first three months of the operation. More than 85% of the arrests made as part of Operation Predator have been arrests of foreign national sex offenders whose crimes make them removable from the United States. Approximately 40% of these are lawful permanent residents and approximately 40% of these are illegal immigrants. To date, more than 5,000 of these predators have been deported. They have also made arrests against human smugglers and child pornographers.

Operation Predator has become the main force behind President Bush's PROTECT Act, which makes it illegal for Americans to travel abroad in order to have sex with a minor. This growing sex tourism industry is fueled by citizens of wealthy countries (mostly Americans, who make up an estimated 25% of all offenders) going to places such as Thailand, Cambodia, and Costa Rica, where they believe they will be protected by lax child protection laws or corrupt law enforcement. Those three nations have been working with ICE and World Vision on a public awareness campaign to stop this industry. Cambodia and Mexico had already been working closely with ICE to stop child sex tourism in their countries.

Some of Operation Predator's other major successes to date include a single web portal to various sex offender registry databases and creating a National Child Victim Identification System. On the international front, they have increased cooperation with INTERPOL and various international governments to combat child pornography and child sex tourism.

There is also an Operation Predator iPhone app to allow users to receive alerts about suspected child sex predators, share the information with friends via email and social media, and submit tips.

The Department of Justice estimates that somewhere between 300,000 and 400,000 U.S. children are sexually exploited every year. The United Nations estimates that one million children are forced into prostitution every year. ICE estimates that child sex tourism victimizes upwards of two million children a year.

== National Child Victim Identification System ==
The National Child Victim Identification System is a massively inter-agency system run by Operation Predator in conjunction with the FBI, the U.S. Postal Inspection Service, the U.S. Secret Service, the Justice Department, and the National Center for Missing and Exploited Children.

This system aims to provide federal and state agencies with a central database of child pornography to aid prosecution, and to positively identify children in child pornography.

The National Child Victim Identification System has been used to convict criminals by proving that the pornographic images the defendants possess are of real children, and not morphed or virtual.

== See also ==
- Operation Angel Watch

== See also ==
- Operation Delego
- Operation Joint Hammer
