= Code of Conduct for the Sexual Exploitation of Children in Travel and Tourism =

Code of conduct made to combat Child Sex Tourism

The Code of Conduct for the Protection of Children from Sexual Exploitation in Travel and Tourism ("The Code") is an international organization composed of representatives from the tourism industry and children's rights experts.

The Code's mission is to provide the structure and tools to combat the sexual exploitation of children in the tourism industry. The key aspect of The Code is a set of six criteria that tourism companies can adopt for implementation. Participating companies work with The Code to implement the six criteria to reduce the occurrence of child sexual exploitation.

== History ==
After the 1996 First World Congress against the Commercial Sexual Exploitation of Children in Stockholm, ECPAT (End Child Prostitution in Asian Tourism) in collaboration with Nordic tour operators, developed the Code of Conduct for the Protection of Children from Commercial Sexual Exploitation in Travel and Tourism.

The Code of Conduct for the Protection of Children from Commercial Sexual Exploitation in Travel and Tourism was adopted in 1998 with the support of the United Nations World Tourism Organization (UNWTO). According to UNICEF, the code has gained over 1000 signatories, in 42 countries. The Code of Conduct for the Protection of Children from Commercial Sexual Exploitation in Travel and Tourism is now considered one of ECPAT's significant successes and has raised awareness of the sexual exploitation of children.

Since 2004, the Code has operated as an independent international organization but maintain close ties with the ECPAT International network as many national ECPAT members work to promote the Code as Local Code Representatives. Currently, the Code secretariat is based in Bangkok, Thailand.

== Objectives ==
There are six criteria that form the guiding principles of the Code, and participating companies are expected to fulfill each of them. The criteria are as follows: establish a policy regarding child sex exploitation; train personnel; integrate anti-exploitation clauses into contracts with suppliers; educate guests about child exploitation by making relevant information available on the company premises; enlist the help of appointed "key persons" who offer their expertise on the subject of combating sexual exploitation; and include information on progress toward achieving the goals of the Code in the annual business reporting.

Participation in The Code is solicited on a voluntary basis. As such, companies that become members of the Code are not legally bound to adhere to the six criteria; instead, these criteria are intended to serve as a road map that enables companies to fulfill their ethical and social responsibilities to the countries in which they operate.

== Members and training ==
As of the 24 February 2013 more than 1,000 travel and hospitality companies from 42 different countries had signed the Code, agreeing to uphold its principles and work towards fulfilling the six essential criteria. Since 2011 many leading names in the tourism industry, including Delta Air Lines, Wyndham Worldwide, and Hilton Worldwide have begun to show their engagement with the problem of sexual exploitation of children, by signing the Code. As a result, the staff of these companies receive training that allows them to identify signs of child exploitation among hospitality guests, and create a general environment of awareness in their establishments.

Other signatories of the Code include Accor, the Kuoni Travel and TUI Travel.
