= International Megan's Law to Prevent Child Exploitation and Other Sexual Crimes Through Advanced Notification of Traveling Sex Offenders =

American federal law

International Megan’s Law to Prevent Child Exploitation and Other Sexual Crimes Through Advanced Notification of Traveling Sex Offenders
- Long title: An act to protect children and others from sexual abuse and exploitation, including sex trafficking and sex tourism, by providing advance notice of intended travel by registered sex offenders outside the United States to the government of the country of destination, requesting foreign governments to notify the United States when a known sex offender is seeking to enter the United States, and for other purposes.
- Nicknames: International Megan's Law

Citations
- Public law: 114-119

Codification
- U.S.C. sections created: 22 U.S. Code § 212b
- U.S.C. sections amended: 42 U.S.C. § 16911, 42 U.S.C. § 16901 et seq., 42 U.S.C. § 16915, 18 U.S.C. § 1801, 22 U.S.C. § 2152d, and others.

Legislative history
- Introduced in the House as H.R. 515 by Rep. Christopher H. Smith (R, NJ-4) and 15 co-sponsors on January 22, 2015; Committee consideration by House Foreign Affairs, House Judiciary, Senate Foreign Relations; Passed the House on January 26, 2015 (voice vote); Passed the Senate on December 17, 2015 (unanimous consent) with amendment; House agreed to Senate amendment on February 1, 2016 (voice vote); Signed into law by President Barack Obama on February 8, 2016

The International Megan's Law to Prevent Child Exploitation and Other Sexual Crimes Through Advanced Notification of Traveling Sex Offenders (H.R. 515) is a federal law that requires, among other things, a visual "unique identifier" to be placed on the passports of registrants convicted of sex offenses involving a minor. The law also requires covered offenders to notify law enforcement 21 days before traveling abroad. Critics have claimed violation of constitutional rights and note that the law would also cover those who were convicted as minors.

HR 515 passed both chambers of the 114th United States Congress on February 2, 2016, and was signed into law by President Obama on February 8, 2016 (Pub. L. 114–119 (text) (PDF)).

Originally introduced during the 113th Congress as the International Megan's Law to Prevent Demand for Child Sex Trafficking (H.R. 4573), which would require the notification of foreign governments when a citizen of United States registered as a sex offender for sexual offense involving a minor is going to be traveling to their country, the original bill passed the United States House of Representatives during the 113th United States Congress but died in the Senate.

The provisions of the law took effect on October 31, 2017. On that date, the State Department began marking affected passports with the following sentence: "The bearer was convicted of a sex offense against a minor, and is a covered sex offender pursuant to 22 United States Code Section 212b(c)(l)." Because the message is too long to fit on the smaller passport card, the law also means that sex offenders can only apply for and carry the more detailed, and more expensive, passport book.

== Background ==
"Megan's Law" is an informal name for laws in the United States requiring law enforcement authorities to make information available to the public regarding registered sex offenders, which was created in response to the 1994 murder of Megan Kanka in New Jersey. Individual states decide what information will be made available and how it should be disseminated. Commonly included information is the offender's name, picture, address, incarceration date, and nature of crime. The information is often displayed on free public websites, but can be published in newspapers, distributed in pamphlets, or through various other means.

== Provisions ==
The law requires notice be given to other countries, through Operation Angel Watch, when registered American sex offenders travel to their countries. The United States Secretary of State would also be allowed to limit or place restrictions on the travel of convicted sex criminals. Finally, the bill would ask the President of the United States to work out reciprocal deals with other countries so that the United States would be informed when foreign sex criminals tried to travel to the United States.

== Procedural history ==
On May 6, 2014, during the 113th United States Congress, the "International Megan's Law to Prevent Demand for Child Sex Trafficking" was introduced into the United States House of Representatives by Rep. Christopher H. Smith (R, NJ-4). It was referred to the United States House Committee on Foreign Affairs and the United States House Committee on the Judiciary. On May 20, 2014, the House considered the bill under a suspension of the rules and voted to pass the amended version in a voice vote. The Senate took no further action.

The re-introduced bill was passed by the Senate in December 2015, during the 114th United States Congress, with an amendment regarding appropriations for enforcement. The bill passed Congress in early February, and was signed by the President on February 8, 2016.

== Debate and discussion ==
Rep. Eliot Engel (D-NY), who supported the bill, said about this and other human trafficking bills that were also passed on May 20, 2014, that "no single law will put an end to sex tourism or child sex trafficking, but every step we take strengthens our ability to prevent these crimes".

According to Rep. Bill Flores (R-TX), the bill would enable the United States "to notify destination countries that a sex offender who has previously abused a child is traveling to that country and encourage reciprocal notification to protect American children from abuse by foreign sex workers".

Chrysanthi Leon, associate professor of sociology and criminal justice and women and gender studies at the University of Delaware, argues that registrants are generally not the ones who will commit new sex crimes and that the U.S. Marshals Service already notifies receiving countries of registered sex offender travel. She says that the restrictions imposed by the law might harm family members of registrants who would face much of the same restrictions, and who are also often the victims, since most sex offenses occur within families. She says the law could, for example, prevent registrants from attending a family member's wedding in another country.

After HR 515 passed the Congress, in February 2016, editorial boards of Los Angeles Times and Monterey Herald, and Lenore Skenazy of Free-range kids urged President Obama to veto the bill. The Volokh Conspiracy likened the "unique identifier" to be placed on sex offenders passports to the letter "J" stamped on passports of Jews in Germany in 1938.

California Reform Sex Offender Laws filed a lawsuit challenging the law in U.S. District Court in San Francisco shortly after HR 515 was signed into a law by President Obama. They say the law will include those convicted of misdemeanors such as "sexting" or public urination to be identified as a sex offender on their passports. The lawsuit says that "a passport symbol that identifies an individual as a registered sex offender could place at significant risk that person as well as others traveling with them, including family members and business colleagues". The lawsuit was dismissed by a San Francisco federal District Judge on the grounds that it was filed prematurely and did not cite any valid constitutional claims.

== See also ==
- List of bills in the 113th United States Congress
- List of acts of the 114th United States Congress
