= United States v. Ramsey (1977) =

- Supreme Court of the United States

Argued March 30, 1977 Decided Jun 6, 1977
- Full case name: United States v. Charles W. Ramsey et al.
- Docket no.: 76-167
- Citations: 431 U.S. 606 (more) 97 S. Ct. 1972; 52 L. Ed. 2d 617

Case history
- Prior: Conviction reversed, 538 F.2d 415 (D.C. Cir. 1976); cert. granted, 429 U.S. 815 (1976).
- Subsequent: Conviction affirmed, 561 F.2d 1022 (D.C. Cir. 1977); cert. denied, 434 U.S. 1062 (1978).

Holding
- The search of letters or envelopes from foreign countries falls under the border exception to the Fourth Amendment.

Court membership
- Chief Justice Warren E. Burger Associate Justices William J. Brennan Jr. · Potter Stewart; Byron White · Thurgood Marshall; Harry Blackmun · Lewis F. Powell Jr. William Rehnquist · John P. Stevens

Case opinions
- Majority: Rehnquist, joined by Burger, Stewart, White, Blackmun, Powell
- Concurrence: Powell
- Dissent: Stevens, joined by Brennan, Marshall

Laws applied
- Fourth Amendment to the United States Constitution

United States v. Ramsey, 431 U.S. 606 (1977), was a United States Supreme Court case in which the Court held the search of letters or envelopes from foreign countries falls under the border exception to the Fourth Amendment to the United States Constitution, which prohibits unreasonable searches and seizures.

== Background ==
United States customs agents, investigating a "mail-order" drug business, opened eight envelopes from Thailand. This search was conducted without a warrant. The envelopes were found to contain heroin. Under established United States law and tradition, the protection from government search did not extend to borders: "the historical practice of warrantless searches and their acceptance at the time the Bill of Rights was adopted indicate that border searches are inherently 'reasonable,' and thus exempt from the Fourth Amendment's probable cause and warrant requirements."

== Case ==
The government used the evidence it obtained from opening the letters when charging Charles W. Ramsay and James W. Kelly with violating federal laws related to drug trafficking. Ramsay and Kelly argued that the evidence was inadmissible, as the result of an illegal search. At issue was whether opening mailed letters was within the scope of the border search exception to the Fourth Amendment's requirement of either a search warrant or probable cause to conduct a search.

In a six to three decision, the Supreme Court ruled that "searches made at the border, pursuant to the longstanding right of the sovereign to protect itself by stopping and examining persons and property crossing into this country, are reasonable simply by virtue of the fact that they occur at the border," declaring the warrantless search of the envelopes to be legal and the evidence to be admissible.
