= United States v. Cotterman =

2013 9th Circuit case regarding electronic storage devices

- Court: United States Court of Appeals for the Ninth Circuit
- Decided: March 8, 2013
- Citation: 709 F.3d 952

Case history
- Prior actions: Motion to suppress granted, United States v. Cotterman, 2009 WL 465028, D. Ariz. (2009); Reversed and remanded, United States v. Cotterman, 637 F.3d 1068, 9th Cir. (2011); Order to rehear en banc, United States v. Cotterman, 673 F.3d 1206, 9th Cir. (2012)
- Appealed to: Supreme Court of the United States

Court membership
- Judges sitting: Kozinski, C.J, Thomas, McKeown, Wardlaw, Fisher, Gould, Clifton, Callahan, Smith Jr., Murguia, Christen, Cir. Js.

Case opinions
- Reasonable suspicion is required to subject a computer seized at the border to forensic examination.

Keywords
- Border search exception, Fourth Amendment, Motion to suppress, Reasonable suspicion, Search and seizure

United States v. Cotterman, 709 F.3d 952 (2013), is a United States court case in which the United States Court of Appeals for the Ninth Circuit held that property, such as a laptop and other electronic storage devices, presented for inspection when entering the United States at the border may not be subject to forensic examination without a reason for suspicion, a holding that weakened the border search exception of the Fourth Amendment to the United States Constitution.

== Background ==
On April 6, 2007, at approximately 10 AM, Howard and Maureen Cotterman drove from Mexico to the Lukeville Port of Entry (POE). Upon arrival, the inspector checked the U.S. Customs and Border Protection, or CBP, electronic database and found a computer-generated alert, based upon Howard Cotterman's prior conviction for child sex crimes in 1992. (In that case, out of California, Cotterman had been convicted of thirty-three offenses, which included two counts of use of a minor in sexual conduct, two counts of lewd and lascivious conduct upon a child, and three counts of annoy/molest a child.) The alert advised the inspector to be on the lookout for child pornography and due to the warning, the Cottermans were sent to a secondary inspection area.

During the vehicle search, two CBP officers discovered two laptops and three digital cameras. The officers were unable to find any contraband, but did discover a number of password protected files. During this time, the ICE case was assigned to Agent Riley, who then drove with her supervisor Agent Brisbane from Sells, Arizona to Lukeville. During the drive, the two agents decided that they would detain the laptops for forensic examination.

After arriving at Lukeville POE at 3 or 3:30 PM, the two agents interviewed Howard and Maureen Cotterman separately. Howard Cotterman offered to help the agents with the computer, but the offer was declined. At 6 PM, the two agents left with both laptops and one digital camera. The devices were taken to Tucson and delivered to John Owens, an ICE computer forensics examiner at 11 PM that night. The camera was returned to the Cottermans as there was no evidence of contraband found. However, on April 8, Agent Owens' forensic examination turned up approximately 75 images of child pornography on Howard Cotterman's computer. Agent Owens called the Cottermans that night, asking Howard Cotterman for assistance opening the password protected files. Howard Cotterman agreed to come in the next day, but only his wife showed up to pick up the other laptop.

It was later discovered that Howard Cotterman boarded a flight to Mexico on April 9, 2007, with a final destination of Sydney, Australia. On April 11, 2007, Agent Owen was able to break the computer security and discovered 378 more images of child pornography. Cotterman was indicted on June 27, 2007, for several charges related to child pornography and unlawful flight to avoid prosecution. He was arrested by Australian law officials and delivered to the U.S. Marshals Service on March 31, 2008.

Before trial, Cotterman filed a motion to suppress all evidence seized by Customs officials and argued that the search of his laptop 170 miles from the port of entry over a period of four days was a non-routine border search requiring reasonable suspicion." The motion was granted by the District Court in Cotterman's favor. The government appealed, and stated that the border search doctrine justified the initial search and the transport of the computer to Tucson to adequately conduct the search. The Ninth Circuit Court of Appeals overturned the lower court's ruling, in favor of the Government.

== Opinion of the Ninth Circuit panel ==
In the majority opinion, Judge Tallman agreed with the Government that border search doctrine allowed property to be transported to a secondary site for examination. However, he also stated that the Government cannot seize property and hold it for "weeks, months, years on a whim" - effectively allowing the courts to continue to determine whether searches and seizures are reasonable on a case-to-case basis.

=== Arguments ===
When appealing the District Court's decision, the government did not argue that there was reasonable suspicion. Instead, the government argued that the border search doctrine supported both the initial search and the transportation of the laptop to Tucson for examination.

=== Judgment ===
The majority found that time and distance did not matter in this instance. In the opinion, Judge Tallman stated the need to control entry at the border. If the government was unable to remove property away from the border, they would have to fully staff and equip each border crossing or be content with blindly shutting its eyes, with both positions being unreasonable. Since the defendant's property was never cleared for entry, it was functionally still at the border at the time of the forensic search. In the opinion, Judge Tallman stated:

Time and space are only relevant to this initial inquiry to the extent that they inform us whether an individual would reasonably expect to be stopped and searched at a geographic point beyond the international border.

The majority also found that reasonable suspicion was not needed since they considered the inspection as a routine search. There was no body search nor was property destroyed. Finally, the Court ruled that they did not consider the two-day delay particularly offensive.

=== Dissent ===
Judge Fletcher dissented with the majority. She argued that the "sticking point" was not whether the government could transport property from the border to another location for inspection, but whether the government could seize property for inspection for an unknown amount of time with no reason to suspect the property contained contraband.

I would hold that officers must have some level of particularized suspicion in order to conduct a seizure and search like the one at issue here, because (1) seizing one's personal property deprives the individual of his valid possessory interest in his property, and (2) authorizing a generalized computer forensic search (untethered to any particularized suspicion) permits the Government to engage in the type of generalized fishing expeditions that the Fourth Amendment is designed to prevent.

== Opinion en banc ==
Reversing the reasoning of the panel, the Ninth Circuit held that forensic examination of a computer seized at the border requires reasonable suspicion. The court also held that there was reasonable suspicion in this case because there was an alert informing the seizing officer of the possibility of child pornography.

== Supreme Court appeal ==
A petition for Writ of Certiorari was filed with the United States Supreme Court on August 5, 2013, after several extensions of time.

Did the Ninth Circuit violate the Constitution, create circuit splits, contravene this Court's decisions, and subvert the appellate process by replacing the question presented by the parties with an issue that the prosecution deliberately abandoned, and by making a factual finding (i.e. that reasonable suspicion existed) for the first time on appeal that disregarded the factual findings of the district court and agents at the scene, and then by holding that a citizen's personal belongings may be seized at the border with no suspicion of wrongdoing?

— Question Presented, p. i of the cert. petition

On January 13, 2014, the Court denied the petition for Certiorari. In March 2014, the Court denied a Petition for Rehearing filed in February 2014, letting the Ninth Circuit's decision stand, along with the reasonable suspicion standard it created.

== Criminal conviction ==
At trial in June 2014, further investigation revealed that Cotterman sexually abused a young girl multiple times over a two-year period, beginning when she was seven years old; ICE had found photographs and videos of the abuse.

Cotterman was found guilty of two counts of production of child pornography, one count of transportation of child pornography, one count of possession of child pornography, and one count of importation of obscene material.

On September 29, 2014, Cotterman was sentenced by Chief U.S. District Judge Raner C. Collins to serve 35 years in prison for child exploitation offenses; after the prison term, he will have lifetime supervised release, with stringent sex offender conditions, including registration as a sex offender.

== See also ==
- United States v. Arnold
- Fourth Amendment to the United States Constitution
- Border search exception
- In re Boucher
