= New Jersey v. T. L. O. =

- Supreme Court of the United States

Argued March 28, 1984 Reargued October 2, 1984 Decided January 15, 1985
- Full case name: State of New Jersey v. T. L. O.
- Citations: 469 U.S. 325 (more) 105 S. Ct. 733; 83 L. Ed. 2d 720; 1985 U.S. LEXIS 41; 53 U.S.L.W. 4083
- Argument: Oral argument
- Reargument: Reargument
- Decision: Opinion

Case history
- Prior: Defendant convicted sub. nom. State ex rel. T. L. O. 178 N.J. Super. 329, 428 A.2d 1327 (Middlesex County Ct., 1980); Affirmed, 185 N.J. Super. 279, 448 A.2d 493 (App. Div., 1982); conviction reversed 94 N.J. 331, 463 A.2d 934 (1983); cert. granted, 464 U.S. 991 (1983).

Holding
- The Fourth Amendment prohibition on unreasonable searches and seizures only partially applies to searches conducted by public school officials (administrators), and the search of T. L. O.'s purse was reasonable.

Court membership
- Chief Justice Warren E. Burger Associate Justices William J. Brennan Jr. · Byron White; Thurgood Marshall · Harry Blackmun; Lewis F. Powell Jr. · William Rehnquist; John P. Stevens · Sandra Day O'Connor

Case opinions
- Majority: White, joined by Burger, Powell, Rehnquist, O'Connor
- Concurrence: Powell, joined by O'Connor
- Concurrence: Blackmun
- Concur/dissent: Brennan, joined by Marshall
- Concur/dissent: Stevens, joined by Marshall; Brennan (Part I)

Laws applied
- U.S. Const. amend IV

New Jersey v. T. L. O., (Note: Sometimes written as New Jersey v. T.L.O.) 469 U.S. 325 (1985), is a landmark decision by the Supreme Court of the United States which established the standards by which a public school official can search a student in a school environment without a search warrant, and to what extent.

The case centered around a student at Piscataway High School in Middlesex County, New Jersey, known then only by her initials T. L. O., (Note: Because T. L. O. was a minor when the lawsuit was filed, her initials were used during litigation to protect her privacy. Her name was later revealed to be Terry Lee Owens.) who was searched for contraband after she was caught smoking in a school bathroom. She was sent to the principal's office, where the assistant vice principal searched her purse and found marijuana, drug paraphernalia, and documentation of drug sales. She was suspended from the school and charged by police for the paraphernalia found in the search, but fought the charges on the basis that the search of her purse violated the Fourth Amendment's prohibition against unreasonable search and seizure.

The New Jersey Superior Court affirmed the constitutionality of the search, but the Supreme Court of New Jersey reversed, holding that the search of her purse was unreasonable. On appeal to the U.S. Supreme Court, the Court held that the Fourth Amendment applies to searches conducted by school officials in a school setting. However, school officials do not need to have probable cause nor obtain a warrant before searching a student. Instead, in order for a search to be justified, school officials must have "reasonable suspicion" that the student has violated either the law or school rules. In a 6–3 decision delivered by Justice Byron White, the Court ruled that the school's search of T. L. O.'s purse was constitutional, setting a new precedent for school searches and student privacy.

== Background ==
=== Prior case law ===
The Fourth Amendment to the United States Constitution prohibits unreasonable searches and seizures by the federal government, which is enforceable against state governments and their agents through the Due Process Clause of the Fourteenth Amendment.

=== Facts of the case ===
On March 7, 1980, a teacher at Piscataway High School in Piscataway, New Jersey discovered two 14-year-old freshmen smoking in the girls' bathroom in violation of school rules. (Note: While students at Piscataway High School were allowed to smoke in designated smoking areas, the bathroom was not one of them.) The teacher brought the two to the principal's office, where they were questioned by assistant vice principal Theodore Choplick. One of the students admitted to smoking and was assigned to complete a three-day smoking clinic before being sent back to class, but the other student, whose initials were T. L. O., denied that she was smoking in the bathroom and said that she "did not smoke at all".

Choplick brought T. L. O. into his private office and demanded to see her purse. (Note: Sources conflict on whether T. L. O. voluntarily gave her purse to Choplick or whether Choplick seized it himself. Regardless, T. L. O. complying with Choplick's demand would not imply consent to be searched because T. L. O. was not informed of her right to withhold consent.) Upon opening it, Choplick found a pack of Marlboro cigarettes and rolling paper on top of the purse, which he associated with marijuana use. Believing a more thorough search "might yield further evidence of drug use", Choplick searched the rest of the purse, revealing a small amount of marijuana, a tobacco pipe, several empty plastic bags, an index card with the names of students who owed her money, and two letters implicating her in dealing marijuana. Choplick called T. L. O.'s mother and turned over the evidence found in T. L. O.'s purse to police. At the request of police, T. L. O.'s mother brought her to the police station for questioning, where T. L. O. admitted to selling marijuana at the school. T. L. O. elaborated that she had sold "approximately 18 to 20 marijuana cigarettes for a price of one dollar each" earlier that day.

T. L. O. received a three-day suspension from the school for smoking in a non-smoking area and an additional seven-day suspension for possessing marijuana on school property. The state brought delinquency charges against T. L. O. for the drugs and paraphernalia found in her purse.

=== Lower court proceedings ===
T. L. O. was tried in the Juvenile and Domestic Relations Court of Middlesex County, New Jersey. T. L. O. filed a motion to suppress the evidence found in her purse, arguing that the search of her purse violated the Fourth Amendment and that the evidence found as a result of it should be excluded from trial. The Juvenile and Domestic Relations Court denied the motion, finding that, while the Fourth Amendment does apply to searches by school officials, a school official is permitted to search a student's belongings if there is "reasonable suspicion" that the student broke the law or school policy. The court found that the search of T. L. O.'s purse was acceptable because Choplick "had reasonable cause to believe that smoking, a violation of school policy, had occurred". T. L. O. was found to be delinquent and was sentenced to one year of probation on January 8, 1982.

T. L. O. appealed the Juvenile Court's decision to the Appellate Division of the New Jersey Superior Court, which also found no violation of the Fourth Amendment. T. L. O. then appealed to the Supreme Court of New Jersey, which reversed the Superior Court's decision, finding that Choplick did not have probable cause or reasonable suspicion to search T. L. O.'s purse. The Supreme Court of New Jersey remanded the case and ordered the evidence found in T. L. O.'s purse to be suppressed. The state appealed the decision to the Supreme Court of the United States, which granted certiorari on November 29, 1983.

== Opinion of the Court ==
Oral arguments were initially heard on March 28, 1984. A rehearing was ordered by the Court and the case was reargued on October 2, 1984. The Supreme Court of the United States, in a 6–3 decision issued by Justice Byron White, balancing between the legitimate expectation of privacy of the individual, even a child, and the school's interest in maintaining order and discipline, held for the appellant (the state). According to school officials, they do require a "reasonable suspicion" to perform a search.

Her possession of any cigarettes was relevant to whether or not she was being truthful, and since she had been caught in the bathroom and taken directly to the office, it was reasonable to assume she had the cigarettes in her purse. Thus, the vice-principal had reasonable cause to suspect a school rule had been broken, and more than just a "hunch" to search the purse. When the vice-principal was searching for the cigarettes, the drug-related evidence was in plain view. The plain view doctrine is an exception to the warrant requirement of the Fourth Amendment. Thus, the reasonable search for cigarettes led to some of the drug related material being discovered, which justified a search (including the zippered compartments inside the bag) resulting in the discovery of the cigarettes and other evidence including a small bag of marijuana and cigarette rolling papers.

=== Other opinions ===
In a separate concurring opinion, Justice Lewis F. Powell Jr. (joined by Justice Sandra Day O'Connor) stated that while he agreed with the Court's opinion, he felt that students in primary and secondary educational settings should not be afforded the same level of protection for search and seizures as adults and juveniles in non-school settings.

Justice William J. Brennan, joined by Justice Thurgood Marshall, agreed with the majority's conclusions about the applicability of the Fourth Amendment to school teachers but dissented from the new standard set down by the Court, which he felt was a departure from the traditional "probable cause" approach.

Today's decision sanctions school officials to conduct full scale searches on a 'reasonableness' standard whose only definite content is that it is not the same test as the 'probable cause' standard found in the text of the Fourth Amendment. In adopting this unclear, unprecedented, and unnecessary departure from generally Fourth Amendment standards, the Court carves out a broad exception to standards that this Court has developed over years of considering Fourth Amendment problems. Its decision is supported neither by precedent nor even by a fair application of the 'Balancing test of power' it proclaims in this very opinion.

Brennan went on to argue that for the government to justify a warrantless search, some "special governmental interest" outside of standard law enforcement interests was required. This idea was later adopted by the Court as the special needs exception.

== See also ==
- List of United States Supreme Court cases, volume 469
- Vernonia School District 47J v. Acton (1995)
- Board of Education v. Earls (2002)
- Safford Unified School District v. Redding (2009)
- Special needs exception
- Terry v. Ohio (1968)
