= Border search exception =

Doctrine in American criminal law

Map of the "100 miles (160 km) zone"

In United States criminal law, the border search exception is a doctrine that allows searches and seizures at international borders and their functional equivalent without a warrant or probable cause. Generally speaking, searches within 100 miles (160 km) of the border are more permissible without a warrant than those conducted elsewhere in the United States. The doctrine also allows federal agents to search people at border crossings without a warrant or probable cause. The government is allowed to use scanning devices and to search personal electronics. Invasive bodily searches, however, require reasonable suspicion.

== Overview ==
Warrantless border searches were first introduced in the United States through Section 24 of the Collection Act of 1789. Eventually, the Supreme Court broadened the use of border search exceptions in Carroll v. United States. This set a legal precedent in 1925 that allows for warrantless border searches of automobiles because officers must have a reasonable or probable cause to do so. However, it was not until 1952, in the Immigration and Nationality Act, that border search exceptions were explicitly stated in federal law.

The border search exception doctrine is not regarded as an exception to the Fourth Amendment, but rather to its requirement for a warrant or probable cause. After the decision in Carroll v. United States, the Supreme Court ruled that travelers and their luggage may be reasonably stopped upon entrance as it serves national security interests at the border. This set the precedent that the expectation of privacy is less at the border than in the interior. The Fourth Amendment balance between the government's interests and the privacy rights of the individual is also struck much more favorably toward the government at the border. This balance at international borders means that routine searches are "reasonable" there, and therefore do not violate the Fourth Amendment's prohibition of "unreasonable searches and seizures".

Federal law allows certain federal agents to conduct search and seizures within 100 miles (160 km) of the border into the interior of the United States. The Supreme Court has clearly and repeatedly confirmed that the border search exception applies within 100 miles (160 km) of the border of the United States as seen in cases such as United States v. Martinez-Fuerte where it was held that the Border Patrol's routine stopping of a vehicle at a permanent checkpoint located on a major highway away from the Mexican border for brief questioning of the vehicle's occupants is consistent with the Fourth Amendment. However, searches of automobiles without a warrant by roving patrols have been deemed unconstitutional.

United States Customs and Border Protection (CBP) officers, US Border Patrol agents, US Homeland Security Investigations (HSI) special agents, and United States Coast Guard personnel (E4 grade and above) who are all customs officers (those tasked with enforcing Title 19 of the United States Code) with the United States Department of Homeland Security, are permitted to search travelers and their belongings at the US border without probable cause or a warrant. Pursuant to this authority, customs officers may generally stop and search the property of any traveler entering the United States at random (even if based largely on ethnic profiles).

== Property searches ==
At the border, customs officers and Border Patrol agents are authorized to search all travelers' closed containers without any level of suspicion. This authority extends to all physical containers, regardless of size or the possible presence of personal, confidential or embarrassing materials. Pursuant to this authority, Customs may also open and search incoming international mail.

=== Use of scanning devices ===
In United States v. Camacho (2004), the United States Court of Appeals for the Ninth Circuit ruled that the use of radioactive scanning devices in customs searches along the United States–Mexico border was reasonable. The judges found that the device used was not a danger to the vehicle or its occupant, and its use did not violate the Fourth Amendment. Their ruling was based on the fact that the Fourth Amendment protects against intrusive searches of the person, but not against searches of a vehicle.

=== Searching of electronic devices ===
Currently, the main area of contention concerning the border search exception is its application to search a traveler's cell phone or other electronic device. In 2014, the US Supreme Court issued its landmark ruling in Riley v. California, which held that law enforcement officials violated the Fourth Amendment when they searched an arrestee's cellphone without a warrant. The court explained, "Modern cell phones are not just another technological convenience. With all they contain and all they may reveal, they hold for many Americans 'the privacies of life.' The fact that technology now allows an individual to carry such information in his hand does not make the information any less worthy of the protection for which the Founders fought."

The Supreme Court has not heard a case concerning warrantless border search of electronic devices and data. Three different circuit courts have ruled on this issue and all found warrantless suspicionless border searches of electronics to be constitutional. No circuit court has chosen to extend Riley's warrant requirement to border searches of electronics, and several explicitly rejected doing so.

==== Ninth Circuit ====
In 2013, predating Riley, the Ninth Circuit Court of Appeals found in United States v. Cotterman that while warrantless, suspicionless border searches of computers are constitutional, reasonable suspicion is required to subject a computer seized at the border to forensic examination.

==== Eleventh Circuit ====
2018's United States v. Vergara marked the first time a federal circuit court addressed whether Riley's reasoning extends to a search of a traveler's cell phone at the border. In Vergara, a divided panel of the Eleventh Circuit Court of Appeals held that, "border searches never require probable cause or a warrant," and Riley's analysis does not apply to border searches, even for forensic searches of cell phones. The dissent, authored by Judge Jill Pryor, disagreed, concluding that, "my answer to the question of what law enforcement officials must do before forensically searching a cell phone at the border, like the Supreme Court’s answer to manually searching a cell phone incident to arrest, 'is accordingly simple—get a warrant.'"

Vergara appealed, calling upon the Supreme Court to resolve the level of Fourth Amendment process necessary for warrantless cell phone searches. His appeal was denied, leaving the circuit court's decision in place.

==== Second Circuit ====
A panel of the Second Circuit Court of Appeals unanimously held in 2026's United States v. Alisigwe that "no suspicion is required before the government searches a traveler’s property at the border." Like the Eleventh Circuit in Vergara above, the Second Circuit refused to apply Riley's warrant requirement to border searches, stating, "We reject Alisigwe’s invitation to extend Riley v. California, 573 U.S. 373 (2014), to conclude that a 'search of a cellphone requires a warrant, even in circumstances where a warrantless search is generally allowed.'"

==== Forensic Searches ====
In May of 2018, in U.S. v. Kolsuz, the Fourth Circuit Court of Appeals has held that it is unconstitutional for US border officials to subject visitors' devices to forensic searches without individualized suspicion of criminal wrongdoing. Just five days later, in U.S. v. Touset, the Eleventh Circuit Court of Appeals split with the Fourth and Ninth Circuits, ruling that the Fourth Amendment does not require suspicion for forensic searches of electronic devices at the border. The existence of a circuit split is one of the factors that the Supreme Court of the United States considers when deciding whether to grant review of a case. However, the fact that current CBP policy reflects the more protective side of this circuit split, requiring reasonable suspicion to conduct an advanced (forensic) search of an electronic device, makes it less likely that the Supreme Court will grant review.

== Living contraband ==
CBP is tasked with enforcing some other border and international commerce laws, including inspecting for invasive species of plants and animals.

== Searches of travelers' bodies ==
Although routine searches of the persons and effects of entrants are not subject to any requirement of reasonable suspicion, probable cause, or warrant, more invasive searches or seizures of a person's body require some suspicion.

The Supreme Court held, in United States v. Montoya de Hernandez, "that the detention of a traveler at the border, beyond the scope of a routine customs search and inspection, is justified at its inception if customs agents, considering all the facts surrounding the traveler and her trip, reasonably suspect that the traveler is smuggling contraband in her alimentary canal." Characterized in terms of the Fourth Amendment, the Court was saying that such a detention was reasonable, and therefore did not violate the Fourth Amendment. (The federal agents in this particular case did not X-ray search her because she claimed she was pregnant. They instead decided to detain her long enough for ordinary bowel movements to evacuate the alimentary canal, despite her "heroic" efforts otherwise.)

The Supreme Court expressly did not rule what level of suspicion would be necessary for a strip, body-cavity, or involuntary x-ray search, though they did say that the only two standards for Fourth Amendment purposes short of a warrant were "reasonable suspicion" and "probable cause" (rejecting a "clear indication" standard).

In the border search context, reasonable suspicion means that the facts known to the customs officer at the time of the search, combined with the officer's reasonable inferences from those facts, provides the officer with a particularized and objective basis for suspecting that the search will reveal contraband. To form a basis for reasonable suspicion, a customs officer may rely on his training and prior experience, and may rely on entirely innocent factors, if the totality of the circumstances provide the officer with reasonable suspicion.

== See also ==
- U.S. Coast Guard (USCG)
- U.S. Customs and Border Protection (CBP)
- U.S. Immigration and Customs Enforcement (ICE)
