= Hoffman Estates v. The Flipside, Hoffman Estates, Inc. =

Hoffman Estates v. The Flipside
- Supreme Court of the United States

Argued December 9, 1981 Decided March 3, 1982
- Full case name: Village of Hoffman Estates v. The Flipside, Hoffman Estates, Inc.
- Citations: 455 U.S. 489 (more) 102 S. Ct. 1186; 71 L. Ed. 2d 362
- Argument: Oral argument
- Opinion announcement: Opinion announcement

Case history
- Prior: Judgement for appellant, 485 F. Supp. 400 (N.D.Ill., 1980); rev'd, 639 F.2d 373, (7th Cir., 1981), certiorari granted, 452 U.S. 904 (1981)

Holding
- Municipal ordinance imposing licensing and other requirements on sale of drug paraphernalia was not facially an overbroad restriction on speech as overbreadth doctrine does not apply to commercial speech; facial challenge as vague fails where plaintiff cannot demonstrate law was impermissibly vague in all its applications, and as economic regulation providing only for civil penalties standard for vagueness is lower. Seventh Circuit reversed.

Court membership
- Chief Justice Warren E. Burger Associate Justices William J. Brennan Jr. · Byron White; Thurgood Marshall · Harry Blackmun; Lewis F. Powell Jr. · William Rehnquist; John P. Stevens · Sandra Day O'Connor

Case opinions
- Majority: Marshall, joined by Burger, Brennan, Blackmun, Powell, Rehnquist, O'Connor
- Concurrence: White
- Stevens took no part in the consideration or decision of the case.

Laws applied
- U.S. Const. Amendment I

Hoffman Estates v. The Flipside, Hoffman Estates, Inc., 455 U.S. 489 (1982), is a United States Supreme Court decision concerning the vagueness and overbreadth doctrines as they apply to restrictions on commercial speech. The justices unanimously upheld an ordinance passed by a Chicago suburb that imposed licensing requirements on the sale of drug paraphernalia by a local record store. Their decision overturned the Seventh Circuit Court of Appeals.

Concerned that the sale of items such as bongs and rolling papers, along with books and magazines devoted to the era's drug culture promoted and encouraged illegal recreational drug use, the board of trustees of the village of Hoffman Estates, Illinois, passed an ordinance requiring that vendors of drug paraphernalia obtain a license to do so, as they lacked the power to ban their sale outright. As a condition of that license, they were required to keep a record of the name and address of anyone buying such items for inspection by the police at any time. One of the two stores it applied to, The Flipside, filed suit in federal court for the Northern District of Illinois, seeking to have the ordinance invalidated, claiming its scope was so wide and overbroad as to possibly prevent the store from selling the books and magazines, thus infringing its First Amendment rights.

Justice Thurgood Marshall wrote for the Supreme Court that the village's ordinance was neither vague nor overbroad since it clearly defined the items affected and only explicitly prohibited marketing that alluded to their use in consuming illegal controlled substances. Byron White wrote a separate concurrence arguing that the Court need only have considered the vagueness issue since the Seventh Circuit had not considered the overbreadth claim. John Paul Stevens took no part in the case.

In the wake of the case many more communities began enacting and enforcing drug-paraphernalia laws, greatly curtailing their sale. It has not had much impact since then, or outside that narrow area of law, but it did establish two important precedents for later cases concerning the overbreadth and vagueness doctrines. In the former area, it clarified an earlier ruling and stated explicitly that the doctrine does not apply to commercial speech; in the latter, it established that a statute challenged for vagueness on its face, prior to enforcement, must be "impermissibly vague in all its applications" for the plaintiff to prevail. It also established that laws regulating economic activity, already held to a lower standard for vagueness since businesspeople can reasonably be expected to know their industry and its products, have an even lower standard to meet when they only call for civil penalties.

== Background ==
During the 1970s, the late 1960s counterculture spread from the college campuses and cities that had nurtured it into American culture as a whole, as those who had experienced it as college students graduated and entered society. One of its many effects was that the recreational use of illegal drugs became more widespread and socially accepted, even outside of the former students. Sociologists Erich Goode and Nachman Ben-Yehuda later wrote that "[t]he 1970s represented something of a high water mark in both the use and the public acceptance and tolerance of illegal drugs."

Marijuana and cocaine in particular were widely used and not considered to be terribly dangerous. Popular culture of the time depicted drug culture and illegal drug use as common and unexceptional. Comedians like Cheech and Chong built their acts around drug humor, songs like "Cocaine" became hits and movies like Annie Hall had scenes with drug use.

Reflecting this trend, sales of drug paraphernalia, products that facilitated the use of illegal drugs, proliferated, becoming a multibillion-dollar business. At first sold on the streets, eventually head shops dedicated to selling them opened up. Stores that sold other merchandise associated with the counterculture, such as rock records, also sold paraphernalia. Some did so quite blatantly, using slogans like "Everything You Need But The Weed," which led lawmakers to believe that these establishments were promoting illegal drug use among teenagers, and indeed even mocking the illegality of those drugs.

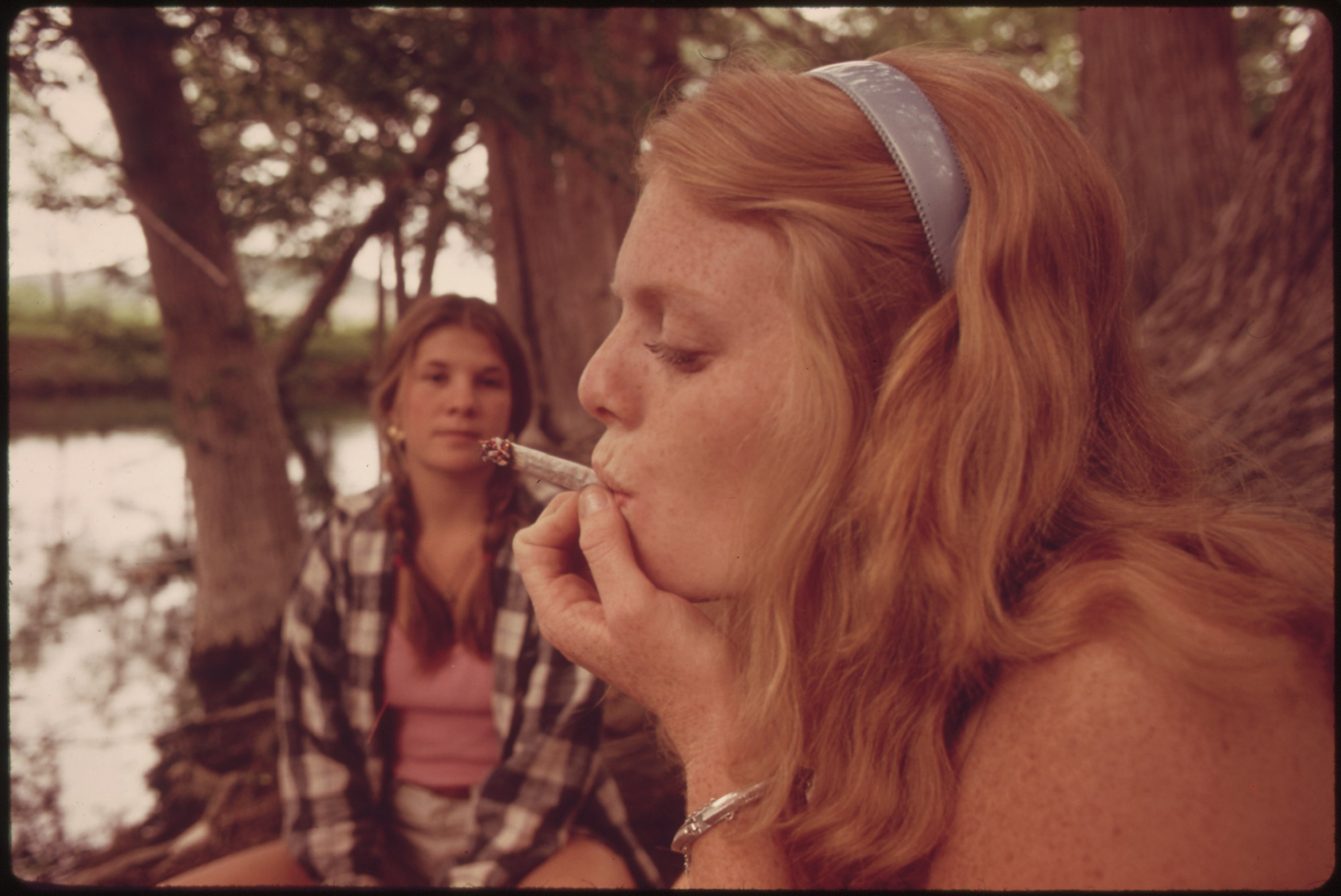
Increased use of illegal drugs, especially marijuana, by teenagers during the 1970s led to efforts to control drug paraphernalia sales.

In response, many communities began passing ordinances that either restricted or prohibited their sale outright. The head shops and other sellers of paraphernalia challenged them in court. While some survived, many early ones were overturned by courts as vague due to their drafters' lack of familiarity with the targeted items and the fact that most smoking equipment can also be used to smoke tobacco and other legal substances, therefore making it hard to say that it is intended and sold only with illegal use in mind.

Compounding the ordinances' constitutional difficulties was the Supreme Court's recent decision in Virginia State Pharmacy Board v. Virginia Citizens Consumer Council, which held that commercial speech was protected under the First Amendment. A Lawrence Township, New Jersey, ordinance targeting five head shops in the Quaker Bridge Mall was thus found to be overbroad since it banned advertising paraphernalia to minors; similarly, a Newark ordinance banning the advertising of paraphernalia was struck down. In response, the Drug Enforcement Administration (DEA) drafted a model ordinance for communities in 1979.

== Underlying dispute ==
In 1978, a year before the DEA promulgated its model ordinance, the board of trustees of the village of Hoffman Estates, Illinois, a suburb of Chicago, passed an ordinance of its own. It did not ban the sale of paraphernalia, but instead required those businesses selling "any item, effect, paraphernalia, accessory or thing which is designed or marketed for use with illegal cannabis or drugs" to get a license. Applicants were required to file an affidavit certifying that no one employed by the business had ever been convicted of a drug-related offense and to keep a record of the name and address of anyone purchasing items covered by the law, which the village police could inspect at any time. Sales to minors were also prohibited. The license fee was $150 (roughly $700 in modern dollars), with any violation punishable by a fine of $10.

The village's attorney determined that two businesses in Hoffman Estates were affected by the ordinance. One of them, the Flipside, had been doing business on West Higgins Road in the village for three years, selling primarily recorded music and accessories for that, as well as jewelry and novelty devices. In one section of the store it sold paraphernalia, accompanied by books such as A Child's Garden of Grass and Marijuana Grower's Guide and magazines like High Times, Rolling Stone and National Lampoon, which often carried articles either discussing drug culture or casually depicting illegal drug use.

After the ordinance passed, the Flipside was notified that it was likely affected. It requested from the village attorney further guidance on what sort of specific items it sold were likely to be affected. Items such as roach clips were in the guidelines as covered by the ordinance. Other items were determined to be covered if they were displayed in the proximity of "literature encouraging illegal use of cannabis or illegal drugs."

The Flipside decided not to apply for a license. Instead it removed 80 items from its shelves and filed suit in federal court, alleging the ordinance was "vague, overbroad, capable of being arbitrarily enforced, and not reasonably related to any legitimate governmental objective of the village in controlling drug abuse." These in turn deprived the Flipside of its rights under the First Amendment and the Commerce Clause. Enforcement of the ordinance would similarly violate its right to due process and equal protection under the Fourteenth Amendment.

== Lower courts ==
The case was first heard by the federal court for the Northern District of Illinois. In 1980, Judge George N. Leighton ruled for the village, holding the ordinance neither vague nor overbroad. His decision was then reversed by the Seventh Circuit Court of Appeals.

=== District court ===
After reviewing the existing law on the subject of vagueness, starting with the Supreme Court's decision in Grayned v. City of Rockford eight years earlier, Leighton considered Hoffman Estates' ordinance. "It is obvious that [it] is not a model of legislative clarity," he began. "Its purpose, nonetheless, is evident." The words "item", "effect", "paraphernalia", "accessory" or even "thing" were not used in a technical sense; "they are, in fact, ordinary words." Since no precedent had considered their definition, he resorted to a dictionary and found clear and specific definitions for all but one. To get a better handle on the remaining word, "paraphernalia", he looked to a 1954 decision in a bookmaking case by a California appellate court, which noted that it was "not a technical word in the law of crimes, although it may be in the law of property." More recently, he noted, both law enforcement and drug users had begun referring to the items targeted by the ordinance collectively as paraphernalia, and the Eighth Circuit had taken notice of that usage in a case where it upheld the seizure of such items based on search warrant which had used the word.

At trial the village attorney had given testimony suggesting that he did not know the meaning of some of the terms in the guidelines, and the village president had testified that she did not know what, exactly, was being regulated. The Flipside had argued that these pointed to the statute's vagueness, but Leighton dismissed those concerns. Both passages had been taken out of context, he wrote. The attorney had been describing how he relied on a report from the police on how such items were displayed in a store, and the village president had similarly explained how she had relied on expertise from the police that she did not herself possess to inform her vote in favor of the ordinance. The judge also noted that the village had enacted an administrative review process to resolve questions over potentially vague terms in the ordinance at the time of any application for a license.

"The guidelines adopted almost contemporaneously with the ordinance, together with the terms used, lead this court to conclude that the operative words of the ordinance under attack are not vague," Leighton wrote. "They are common, ordinary expressions, the meaning of which is known to everyone familiar with the English language. They are sufficiently clear that all persons that acted for and on behalf of the plaintiff could gain a reasonably clear idea of what the ordinance required ..." If they had not been, the Flipside would not have, prior to litigation, removed from its shelves enough items for the village to have conceded to the court that the ordinance no longer applied to it.

Leighton next turned to the overbreadth argument. The Flipside had claimed that since the guidelines had expressly referred to whether the affected items were placed next to literature advocating or promoting the use of illegal drugs as a factor in determining whether they were covered, their rights to offer such literature for sale would be subject to a chilling effect. While he agreed that their extensive briefs on the issue were "highly sophisticated, indeed ingenious", he agreed with the village that there was no First Amendment issue.

The Flipside's briefs had properly relied on Virginia State Pharmacy Board v. Virginia Citizens Consumer Council. But, Leighton reminded them, an earlier case, Pittsburgh Press Co. v. Pittsburgh Commission on Human Relations, had also held that commercial speech proposing illegal activity (for example, offering illegal drugs for sale) could be constitutionally regulated. "Thus, even assuming that marketing is a form of advertising entitled to some degree of First Amendment protection, the restriction applied by this ordinance does not infringe on any protected First Amendment activity," Leighton concluded. And, since it only affected that, it could not be considered overbroad. "Plainly, by no construction of the Constitution has the plaintiff any right to sell, either in the village of Hoffman Estates or anywhere else, any 'items, effect, paraphernalia, accessory or thing which is designed or marketed for use with illegal cannabis or drugs ... '"

Lastly, Leighton considered the Flipside's Fourteenth Amendment claims. The record store had conceded that while the village had a legitimate governmental interest in curbing the sale and use of illegal drugs in its jurisdiction, no compelling state interest existed to justify abridgement of its First Amendment rights by the ordinance. "[T]he court is constrained to agree with defendants," wrote Leighton, since the Flipside have overcome the presumption that the ordinance was valid only if it had shown the absence of a rational basis. Since it had already conceded the village's interest in enforcing state drug laws, and Leighton had already found the ordinance did not infringe the record store's First Amendment rights, there was no constitutional violation. " Furthermore, there is no conceivable colorable claim of a fundamental constitutional right to sell items which facilitate and encourage the use of illegal drugs," Leighton added.

"The objectives of the defendants in enacting this ordinance," Leighton concluded, "to prevent convicted drug dealers and users from selling drug paraphernalia and gaining contacts with a ready market, to prevent a marketing approach which encourages and facilitates illegal drug use, and to require that these items be sold by responsible businesses which are reasonably licensed, are rationally related to the compelling interest in controlling drug abuse, well within the proper health and safety concerns of the village." He denied the Flipside both declaratory and injunctive relief.

=== Appeals court ===
The Flipside appealed to the Seventh Circuit Court of Appeals. A pair of circuit judges, Robert Arthur Sprecher and Harlington Wood Jr., were joined by Henry George Templar of the District of Kansas to form a panel. They heard oral arguments late in 1980 and announced their decision reversing the district court early the next year.

After reviewing the facts of the case and the proceedings thus far, Sprecher noted that since the case was filed, there had been challenges to drug-paraphernalia ordinances all over the country, many to ordinances based on the DEA model that criminalized the sale, manufacture and possession of the affected items. Within circuits, and indeed even within districts, judges had reached different conclusions. Those that had found the ordinances unconstitutional had done so on vagueness grounds. Only one had reached an appeals court, and none had reached the merits of the ordinances themselves.

Hoffman Estates' ordinance was different, Sprecher observed, in that imposed not a ban and criminal penalties but licensing and civil penalties. It recognized that paraphernalia was legal to sell, "[y]et one of the purposes of the ordinance obviously must be to do indirectly what it claims it cannot do directly—to effectively ban the sale of a broad class of items, some of which may be used with illegal drugs." No business, he reasoned, would want the stigma of being so publicly identified as a paraphernalia dealer, nor would many patrons buy such items if they had to provide their identities, potentially to the police. It was possibly, Sprecher allowed, to draft an ordinance to accomplish that goal within constitutional limits.

"But the inherent vagueness of the English language," Sprecher concluded after reviewing the text of the ordinance and Grayned and the other relevant precedents, "coupled with the admirable intention of stemming drug abuse, cannot save an ordinance which fails to give fair notice of what it prohibits." He subjected the text to a closer reading than the district court had. Yes, he agreed with Leighton, the five words had clear meanings. "But the fact that [they do] does not sufficiently clarify the scope of the licensing requirement, which applies to any person who sells [them]." He found the phrase after those words, "which is designed or marketed for use with illegal cannabis or drugs" to be most determinative of how the ordinance would be interpreted and enforced. "Unless the license guidelines give additional clarity to this phrase, we must agree with plaintiff that the ordinance is so vague that it does not give sufficient notice to merchants as to whether they are required to obtain a license, and for which items the name and address of the purchaser must be recorded and sale to minors prohibited."

In an unreported Indiana case, Sprecher wrote, a three-judge district court panel had found a more detailed ordinance too vague in the use of the similar phrase "designed for use with drugs" since many legal items could be used, or easily altered for use, as drug delivery devices. He read the guidelines written for Hoffman Estates ordinance by the village attorney as using "designed" to denote "those items which are inherently suited only for drug use, and are thus covered by the ordinance regardless of the manner of display or avowed intent of the retailer." However, even in one case where the guidelines left no room for interpretation based on the latter, the guidelines were insufficient.

For example, the guidelines state that "roach clips" are "designed for use with illegal cannabis or drugs and therefore covered"... But the guidelines do not define "roach clip." Consequently, stocking any item that could possibly be used as a roach clip, such as an alligator clip or bobby pin, could subject a retailer to the licensing requirement. In reality, it is inconceivable that sale of these innocent items would subject a hardware store or drugstore to the burdens of the license fee and sales register, as well as to the label of "drug paraphernalia store." Perhaps the village wishes to draw a line between items which inherently are roach clips and "innocent" items merely used as roach clips. But neither the ordinance nor the guidelines draws this distinction, and we are uncertain as to whether any definition of a roach clip could draw such a distinction based on design alone.

When it came to rolling papers, Sprecher found the guidelines not only vague but confusing:

Another item which the guidelines say is inherently drug related is "paper of colorful design, names oriented for use with illegal cannabis or drugs and displayed." But the guidelines also say that "white paper or tobacco oriented paper not necessarily designed for use with illegal cannabis or drugs may be displayed." This guideline attempts to tell the retailer which rolling papers are covered and which are not, but the definition is circular because it puts the burden back on the retailer to decide what is "tobacco oriented" paper not necessarily designed for use with drugs and what is "drug oriented" paper. Is all white rolling paper outside the ordinance, even if there is an advertisement for a water pipe on the package? Does "paper of colorful design" mean that brown or beige paper is covered, or could some colored paper be considered "tobacco oriented"?

Ultimately, the problem with "designed for use", he said, was that the manufacturer, not the seller, determined that. Were the ordinance to prescribe criminal penalties, that aspect alone would be enough to invalidate it, he added in a footnote.

Sprecher dismissed the village's argument that the marketing of the items met the test laid out by the Supreme Court in Leary v. United States, that there be a rational connection between the fact proved and the fact presumed. They had missed the point of that case, where the Court had struck down Timothy Leary's conviction for smuggling marijuana because it could not be rationally presumed, as the Marihuana Tax Act of 1937 did, that someone possessing the drug knew it came from outside the United States. "[T]he issue here is whether the 'fact proved,' (marketing scheme), is too vague a standard to give rise to the 'fact presumed,' (drug-relatedness)," he said.

The guidelines were also unsatisfactory on how to determine if the items were marketed for use with illegal drugs, Sprecher found. They depended heavily on the items being sold in "proximity" to other covered items, or "literature encouraging illegal use of cannabis or drugs." Since "paraphernalia" had such an expansive definition, he argued, anything sold near such literature could be covered. "This means that paper clips sold next to Rolling Stone magazine conceivably could trigger the requirements of the ordinance."

The village had argued that, even if the words were vague themselves, they adequately defined what had come to be known as drug paraphernalia. Further, they cited McGowan v. Maryland, where the Supreme Court had held that regulations aimed at business activities had a lower vagueness standard to meet since businesses knew their industry could reasonably be expected to research and prepare for the implementation of those regulations. Sprecher rejected that. "To apply that standard as defendants suggest would presuppose that the business the retailers are engaged in is the business of selling items 'designed or marketed for use with illegal cannabis or drugs,'" he wrote. "The plaintiff vigorously contests that characterization of its business."

Because of the ordinance's vagueness there was a danger of "arbitrary and discriminatory enforcement", Sprecher claimed. He pointed to a Georgia case brought by two stores had had their business licenses revoked for selling alleged paraphernalia, where the judge had found, among other vague aspects of the law in question, that "conflicting lifestyles and political views suffuse the decision maker's perception of what buyers will do with the product." He saw the same possibility in the case before him. The village's brief had, Sprecher observed, suggested that no responsible business would sell paraphernalia.

Thus the ordinance is not, as the village argues, the same as the village's regulation of milk, flowers, and other activities requiring a license. Rather, the ordinance brands licensees as irresponsible businesses, a stigma which should not be applied according to the tastes of village officials who may be offended by a retailer's marketing approach.

Sprecher also found that the requirement to keep names and addresses of paraphernalia buyers created the same issue, since it might well have been considered probable cause sufficient for a search warrant. The village had likened it to similar records pharmacists were required to keep of Schedule V controlled substances. But he distinguished it by noting that the Schedule V drugs were themselves otherwise illegal to possess, whereas the paraphernalia was perfectly legal. "[T]he record-keeping section implies that a customer who purchases an item 'designed or marketed for use with illegal cannabis or drugs' intends to use the item with illegal cannabis or drugs."

The village's final argument was that the guidelines were only a beginning and could evolve over time into something more specific. But Sprecher did not see that as even possible. "[T]his ordinance is impermissibly vague on its face," he wrote. "Therefore, it does not provide an administrative body with adequate standards to guide and limit the administrators' discretion in drawing guidelines." Since he had so thoroughly explained why the ordinance was void for vagueness, he found it unnecessary to consider the overbreadth arguments.

== Before the Court ==
A petition for rehearing was denied. The village then petitioned the Supreme Court for certiorari, which was granted late in 1981. Amicus curiae briefs on its behalf, urging reversal, were filed by the attorneys general of 21 states, the village of Wilmette, Illinois (another Chicago suburb), and Community Action Against Drug Abuse. American Businesses for Constitutional Rights filed a brief urging affirmance.

Oral arguments were heard late in the year. Richard Williams, the village attorney and drafter of the ordinance, argued for it as he had throughout the proceedings; similarly, Michael Pritzker argued for the Flipside. Justice John Paul Stevens, the Seventh Circuit's chief judge prior to his 1976 elevation to the Court, took no part in the consideration or decision of the case.

=== Hoffman Estates' oral argument ===
Williams focused on defending the village from the First Amendment claims, saying he and the board had been aware of that and tried to draft the ordinance narrowly. He noted that the appeals court had focused purely on the vagueness issue. "[T]his is a civil licensing ordinance," he told the justices, "and, we believe, one that does not invade constitutionally protected areas."

Nevertheless, the Court wanted to hear about the vagueness issue. "[W]hat if you can identify some article under this ordinance that any fool would know is covered by it?" Justice Byron White asked. "Is that the end of the inquiry?" Williams eventually was able to tell him that, if there was a clearly identified object, that it would have been held that there was nothing to review until actual enforcement created a potential issue.

When he had begun drafting the ordinance, prior to the DEA's model, "[w]e saw the difficulty right away with trying to make these items per se." So, following McGowan, they decided to put the burden on the retailer by focusing on the marketing of the paraphernalia. "We chose to place no criminal prohibition even on a minor that bought from a retailer that was selling illegally," which, he explained, addressed the issue of transferred intent.

By avoiding any regulation of actual advertising, as had occurred in other cases, the board felt it had steered clear of all First Amendment issues, Williams continued. "[E]ven if their argument on display could be free expression, it fails because it is advocating use with illegal substances," he said in answer to a question about the distinction between advertising and marketing.

Sandra Day O'Connor asked Williams if he had interpreted the ordinance to include a scienter requirement. No, he told her, whereupon she asked him to explain what intent element he saw. "Designed or marketed, we believe, are active words, as opposed to passive." Intent, he argued, could be inferred from the manner of sale or display.

The Seventh Circuit, Williams continued, had "strained to find an interpretation other than designed for use ... A court should not strain to find unconstitutionality." He reiterated that the ordinance was not meant to target a hardware dealer selling alligator clips, but head shops in particular. "I think drug abuse is a serious cancer in our society, and we think that this will chill the retailing of these items to be used with illegal drugs."

When bongs, rolling papers and the other covered items that had legal uses were displayed together, Williams asked, "What is the one common use that can be used with these items? And that, of course, as any child or parent would know, would be to be used with illegal substances. It is more likely than not that they will be used with illegal substances, not tobacco or any other item."

"We are really asking the Court two things," he continued. The first was to take the presumption that illegal use was intended in that kind of marketing, or at least take judicial notice. The second was in regard to the appeals court's concern about targeting certain lifestyles. "I can't make the argument strong enough that I think under the rational interest of the community and the state we have a right to legislate against lifestyles, such as homicidal maniacs, burglars, and drug abusers ... We don't like his lifestyle in Hoffman Estates, and I don't think anywhere else in the country do they care for that lifestyle, and I believe we have a right to legislate."

=== The Flipside's oral argument ===
Pritzker said the village had "attempted to narrow the question so that the issue presented is any item, effect, thing which is designed or marketed for use with illegal drugs, unconstitutionally vague." That presentation of the issue, he went on, "is an attempt to overlook the dynamics and other problems inherent in the construction of the ordinance based on the trial record and as construed by the Seventh Circuit." He characterized their argument as "vacillating between an argument that this is drug paraphernalia; on the other hand, well, it is not really paraphernalia, it is paraphernalia because of the way it is marketed."

One justice asked Pritzker about Oliver Wendell Holmes's observation in Nash v. United States that "the law is full of instances where a man's fate depends on his estimating rightly, that is, as the jury subsequently estimates it, some matter of degree." He allowed that there was "some looseness" but said the ordinance was still vague, allowing too much room for personal taste to color judgement: "Is a blue pipe inherently criminal, and a brown pipe lawful because in the officer's experience brown is customary and usual? We are essentially talking about taste, and I think we have been unfairly characterized with regards to what lifestyle means. Lifestyle did not refer to drug culture."

White challenged Pritzker on what the situation would be if a customer explicitly referred to an intent to use illegally during the sale. He responded that a different standard would apply, and held to that position when asked how, if that was the case, the ordinance could still be vague on its face, since that would more clearly indicate such marketing. "[I]f a customer had gone into a grocery store and purchased a thousand Glad bags or Ziploc bags because that is the common way that marijuana is distributed in small amounts, and if he sold it, would that grocer be required to get a license?" He maintained that the ordinance strictly targeted just the marketing, and so its requirements wouldn't be triggered by any reference to illegal sale.

Pritzker reminded the Court of the circumstances under which the ordinance had been originally enforced. "They walked into the Flipside store and said, this ordinance is coming into effect, and you are covered, so certainly they don't mean intent, because they just determined intent." At trial, he noted, some of the items the village claimed had been purchased at the Flipside turned out to have been, in fact, acquired at other shops. A village police officer testified that a bong he had once seized turned out to have tobacco residue in it. "I think the only issue is, if a brass water pipe is lawful, like Pier 1 sells and like many tourists who come back from the east [buy], why is a blue one unlawful"

Could the same ordinance cover hypodermic needles, Pritzker was asked. He replied that Illinois law already prohibited their possession or sale without a prescription, and limited their sale to pharmacies. Also, he noted, states like North Dakota had exempted them when they adopted the DEA model, since it was common for farmers to inject veterinary medicine into animals themselves. He denied that a needle ban would be vague because the law already clearly defined hyodermic needles and syringes.

Pritzker asked the justices to consider other examples of situations where the ordinance's underlying theory would be problematic. The village, he recalled, had found support for part of its ordinance in the prohibition of alcohol sales to minors. One of the devices sold by the Flipside that it had complained about was a small mirror with "Cocaine" written on it. (Note: Prior to snorting, lumps of cocaine are often placed on mirrors and cut into lines with razor blades.) "[Would it] be so clear that if a child cannot possess liquor, would it be unlawful for him to possess a Schlitz glass, a beer mug with the word Schlitz on it? And since he can't drink, would it be unlawful for him to have a Johnny Walker Red mirror?" Many tobacconists' shops had sold books and magazines as well, often related to tobacco use. "Suppose we take Dunhill, and their pipe shop, and their pipe array, and we add to that the posters," he asked. "Does that change the marketing aspect? Do we have NORML posters, and Liberate Marijuana, and those kind of posters on the wall? Now we are displaying the same merchandise, but have we changed the manner of display?"

Pritzker held to his argument even in cases posited of an ordinance that prohibited the public display, without a license to do so, of pistols with barrels shorter than five inches (5 inches (130 mm)), which are limited to police use. "The merchant would know what is expected of him," he answered. "There are standards for compliance," which, he went on to argue at length, were lacking in the village's ordinance, although he agreed that there were other statutes, such as the Robinson–Patman antitrust statute, where "people cannot be absolutely certain whether they are complying or not."

Lastly, Pritzker maintained that even a presumption of intent would not suffice to render the law constitutional. "Intent does not give a standard for adjudication or compliance," he said. "[I]ntent cannot add a standard, does not give somebody notice of what is expected of them."

=== Hoffman Estates' rebuttal ===
The village was granted five minutes to make a rebuttal argument. Williams focused on Pritzker's distinction that while the village required a license for all sellers of milk, it did not require one for all sellers of corncob pipes, just the Flipside and the other store. "We didn't say we do," he said. "We license only corncob pipes marketed for use with illegal drugs."

"We are going right at the retailer," Williams maintained, citing some other recent appellate decisions that had upheld similar ordinances. Asked if it would help his case if the paraphernalia was displayed next to signs "reading generally, forget your troubles, escape from your anxieties, et cetera?" he said it all came to down to where it was displayed. If such a sign was next to the records, it would not factor into how the ordinance was enforced, he said.

== Opinion of the Court ==
In March 1982 the Court handed down its decision. All eight participating justices had sided with the village, holding the ordinance valid and constitutional. Thurgood Marshall wrote the opinion, joined by all the other justices except Byron White, who wrote a separate concurrence.

After reviewing the case, Marshall set out the court's task. "In a facial challenge to the overbreadth and vagueness of a law, a court's first task is to determine whether the enactment reaches a substantial amount of constitutionally protected conduct." Laws that did not would not be invalidated as overbroad. Next, a court considering vagueness "should uphold the challenge only if the enactment is impermissibly vague in all of its applications. A plaintiff who engages in some conduct that is clearly proscribed cannot complain of the vagueness of the law as applied to the conduct of others".

The appeals court had not done that in this case, Marshall wrote. It had found the ordinance vague based on a review of only some of its possible applications. "Under a proper analysis," Marshall began, "the ordinance is not facially invalid."

He started with the overbreadth claims, which the appeals court had declined to review. The Flipside's argument that the guidelines' focus on the books and magazines displayed with the paraphernalia constituted a form of prior restraint were "exorbitant" for two reasons: the ordinance did not reach noncommercial speech to begin with, and the only commercial speech it did affect was the marketing of paraphernalia for illegal use.

"We doubt that the village's restriction on the manner of marketing appreciably limits Flipside's communication of information—with one obvious and telling exception," Marshall wrote. In a footnote, he pointed out that the record store had testified at trial that it placed many of those items near the cash register because they were either likely to be impulse purchases best placed at the point of sale or because they were small and likely to be shoplifted, not because it had wanted to communicate any particular information to customers. "The ordinance is expressly directed at commercial activity promoting or encouraging illegal drug use," Marshall said. "If that activity is deemed 'speech,' then it is speech proposing an illegal transaction, which a government may regulate or ban entirely." The overbreadth doctrine not only did not apply, it could not apply since it did not cover commercial speech, something the Court had implied in another case two years earlier.

Marshall next considered the vagueness claim. "The ordinance nominally imposes only civil penalties. However, the village concedes that the ordinance is 'quasi-criminal,' and its prohibitory and stigmatizing effect may warrant a relatively strict test," he wrote. But even under a stricter test, the ordinance was "sufficiently clear." No one doubted the meaning of the terms for cannabis or other illegal drugs; those were already and extensively defined in Illinois's state statutes. "The Court of Appeals' speculation about the meaning of 'design' is largely unfounded," he went on. Going with the dictionary definition of "design" as meaning "to fashion according to a plan," he observe that "a business person of ordinary intelligence would understand that this term refers to the design of the manufacturer, not the intent of the retailer or customer." While there were, he admitted, ambiguous terms in the guidelines and ordinances, he found the "designed for use" standard "sufficiently clear to cover at least some of the items that Flipside sold," in particular roach clips (Note: In a footnote (501n18), Marshall said the Seventh Circuit's criticism of the ordinance for not defining "roach clip" was "unfounded," since a dictionary definition of "roach" that included "the butt end of a marijuana cigarette" existed, and specialized drug slang dictionaries further defined roach clips.) which have no legal use.

"Marketed for use" was, in contrast, a "transparently clear" standard. "[I]t describes a retailer's intentional display and marketing of merchandise," Marshall wrote. "The standard requires scienter, since a retailer could scarcely 'market' items 'for' a particular use without intending that use."

Finally, Marshall turned to the Seventh Circuit's concern that the ordinance could be selectively enforced and used to harass people who chose alternative lifestyles. He called it misplaced and outside the scope of the review. "In reviewing a business regulation for facial vagueness ... the principal inquiry is whether the law affords fair warning of what is proscribed," he wrote. "Here, no evidence has been, or could be, introduced to indicate whether the ordinance has been enforced in a discriminatory manner or with the aim of inhibiting unpopular speech. The language of the ordinance is sufficiently clear that the speculative danger of arbitrary enforcement does not render the ordinance void for vagueness."

"We do not suggest that the risk of discriminatory enforcement is insignificant here," Marshall admitted, since the village had said that it had relied on the experience of its police officers and would do so in the future. But it was too soon to tell if that would lead to constitutional issues in practice. And furthermore, it was likely that "the village w[ould] take no further steps to minimize the dangers of arbitrary enforcement" since it could adopt administrative regulations that could narrow or clarify the vague terms in the ordinance. In fact, Marshall wrote, the village's decision to base its enforcement on the marketing of products, rather than their design, was a better standard since it did not require analysis of each individual item, and thus was less likely to be enforced unfairly.

In closing, Marshall acknowledged the many cases of similar laws on the federal docket:

Many American communities have recently enacted laws regulating or prohibiting the sale of drug paraphernalia. To determine whether these laws are wise or effective is not, of course, the province of this Court. We hold only that such legislation is not facially overbroad or vague if it does not reach constitutionally protected conduct and is reasonably clear in its application to the complainant.

White's short concurrence agreed with Marshall's conception of the vagueness test. "I do not, however, believe it necessary to discuss the overbreadth problem in order to reach this result," he wrote. "There is, in my view, no need to go any further: If it is 'transparently clear' that some particular conduct is restricted by the ordinance, the ordinance survives a facial challenge on vagueness grounds." The Flipside's overbreadth claim was so "tenuous" that it was best left to the lower court as the appeals court had done.

== Aftermath ==
With the ordinance upheld, many other communities across the country passed similar anti-paraphernalia ordinances. Court challenges continued, but eventually sales of drug paraphernalia became less widespread, as many record stores and small retailers felt they could no longer sell such merchandise profitably under the restrictions. The DEA would later claim that "thousands of paraphernalia shops were literally legislated out of business."

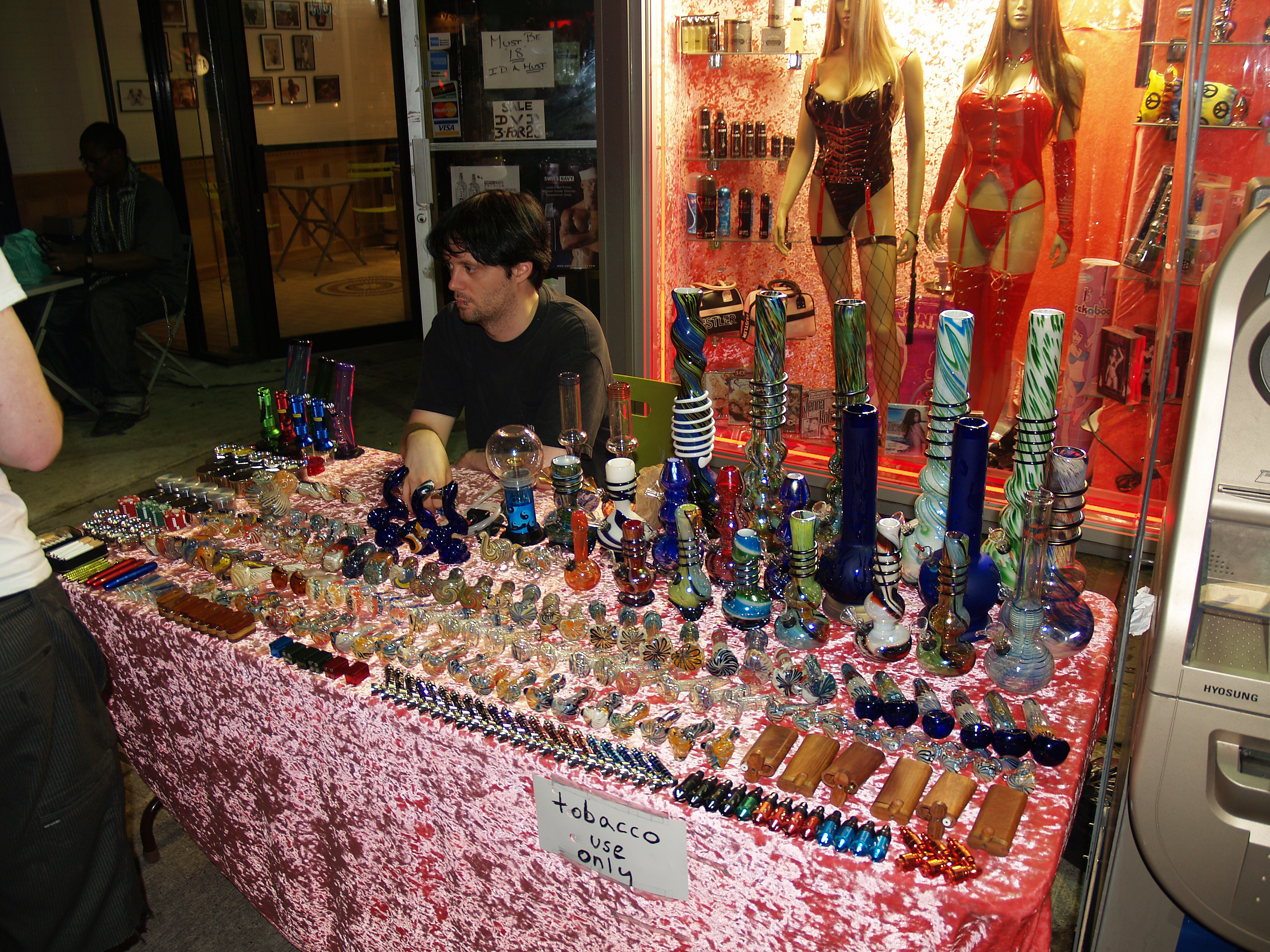
Bongs and pipes being sold on the street in New York City, 2007, with "tobacco use only" sign

Drug paraphernalia is still sold today, but in a legal gray area. Congress passed a federal ban in 1986; in all states save West Virginia (which just requires a license) paraphernalia is prohibited as well. Often they are accompanied by signs that remind purchasers they are meant for legal purposes only; retailers will also deny any sale where a customer mentions illegal use. Many sellers have moved to the Internet, where the industry has once reached, according to a 2003 estimate, a billion dollars in annual sales.

== Subsequent jurisprudence ==
Hoffman Estates guided many lower courts considering similar cases, but it did not guarantee the same result. Where no distinction between the challenged ordinance or statute and the one at issue in Hoffman Estates could be made, the governments prevailed, as in Stoianoff v. Montana, a Ninth Circuit case early in 1983. However, in late 1983, an Ohio district judge threw out a similar ordinance from West Carrollton because it had failed to include any guidelines.

=== In Seventh Circuit ===
Back on the Seventh Circuit, two more cases decided shortly after Hoffman Estates considered two different types of ordinances in light of that holding. One, Levas and Levas v. Village of Antioch, concerned the model DEA ordinance, passed by another Illinois community. The other, Record Head Corp. v. Sachen, turned on a West Allis, Wisconsin, ordinance that carried criminal penalties.

The same three-judge panel, consisting of circuit chief judge Walter J. Cummings Jr., Circuit judge Wilbur Frank Pell Jr. and William G. East, a senior judge of the District of Oregon sitting by designation, heard both cases but deferred deciding them while Hoffman Estates was pending. Afterwards, it asked all parties for fresh briefs on their positions taking the decision into account, and announced both decisions on the same day, four months after Hoffman Estates.

The panel upheld the Antioch ordinance in Levas but struck down the West Allis ordinance in Record Head. The decisions were not unanimous. Pell issued a one-sentence concurring opinion in the former but dissented at length from the latter.

==== Levas and Levas v. Village of Antioch ====
In Levas, two brothers who ran a T-shirt shop in Antioch challenged that village's ordinance. Writing for himself and East, Cummings admitted that due to the difference in the ordinances Hoffman Estates was not controlling precedent, as the village had argued. But, he reminded the Levases, "[it] also sets important limits on facial constitutional attacks in the drug paraphernalia area, and is therefore not so distinguishable as [they] would have us believe."

Following the Supreme Court, Cummings dispensed with the overbreadth argument, summarizing the Court's position as "[litigants] cannot assert the commercial speech rights of others." The vagueness claims required longer discussion for several reasons. First, the ordinance imposed criminal penalties, requiring a more thorough review; and second, Antioch's ordinance differed from Hoffman Estates' by setting out a list of specific factors that could be considered as determinative of intent to use illegally. The Levases further argued that, by defining coke spoons and marijuana pipes in great detail, the village had imposed strict liability not present in the Hoffman Estates ordinance, making the objects illegal per se without regard to lawful uses.

The Antioch ordinance had "a large, but not entirely amorphous class of items that can be paraphernalia, and an intent requirement that differentiates innocent transfers of multi-purpose items from illegal transfers of drug paraphernalia," Cummings noted. "That combination satisfies the fair notice aspect of the vagueness test, even in its strictest form." Despite all the precedent he cited, he felt that conclusion required further elucidation:

Here the scienter requirement is not simply a circular reiteration of the offense—an intent to sell, offer for sale, display, furnish, supply or give away something that may be classifiable as drug paraphernalia. Rather the scienter requirement determines what is classifiable as drug paraphernalia: the violator must design the item for drug use, intend it for drug use, or actually employ it for drug use. Since very few of the items a paraphernalia ordinance seeks to reach are single-purpose items, scienter is the only practical way of defining when a multi-purpose object becomes paraphernalia. So long as a violation of the ordinance cannot be made out on the basis of someone other than the violator's knowledge, or on the basis of knowledge the violator ought to have had but did not, this sort of intent will suffice to distinguish "the paper clip which holds the pages of this memorandum of opinion from an identical clip which is used to hold a marijuana cigarette."

The ordinance's passages on factors that could be considered indicators of intent to use illegally, Cummings found, went from highly probative (statements of intent to use illegally, illegal drug residue on object) to highly relevant (previous drug convictions of defendant, proximity in time and space to illegal use when found) to somewhat relevant (the scope and size of possible legal uses in the community) to two that were not (national and local advertising concerning use and expert testimony concerning use). "Most of these factors are specific and relevant. They constitute effective directions of enforcement activities, and they limit the possibilities of arbitrary enforcement," he wrote. "To the extent that all the factors are not equally relevant and specific, however, the chance that the weaker ones will be relied on is too remote to sustain a facial vagueness attack."

On the strict-liability question, Cummings distinguished the issue from other paraphernalia-ordinance cases. Where plaintiffs in those, like Hoffman, had attacked the ordinances for lacking an exact definition of the various items, Antioch's went into great detail, defining coke spoons and pot pipes, for instance, as those having bowls below a certain size and thus optimal for illegal use. "We cannot see how the definitions could be more specific," he observed, "and the remote possibility that they could apply to an antique salt spoon or a woman's pipe does not require a finding of vagueness." Instead, the Levases had argued that the specificity had made those items illegal despite known lawful uses.

"As a matter of statutory construction, appellants are correct," Cummings wrote. But even so, that might not be a problem. "In the first place, making the sale of cocaine spoons or marijuana or hashish pipes per se illegal may well not offend the Constitution ... At most, there is an outside chance that the provisions might be found to violate the Due Process Clause." He could not find any successful cases where plaintiffs making a pre-enforcement vagueness challenge to a statute on strict-liability grounds had succeeded, and said it was better to wait and see if any such issues arose as an ordinance was challenged.

In conclusion, Cummings held the Antioch ordinance constitutional provided three conditions were met: that it was construed to preclude convictions based on transferred intent, that it required the seller or possessor have knowledge of intended illegal use rather than "negligent ignorance", and that strict-liability enforcement be limited. "We intimate no views about constitutional issues that may arise in the context of particular attempts to enforce the ordinance."

==== Record Head Corp. v. Sachen ====
West Allis's ordinance focused on curbing drug paraphernalia sales to minors. Not only were such sales forbidden, all paraphernalia sales within a thousand feet (305 m) of a school. It also required that paraphernalia be displayed only in portions of stores not visible to minors and where they could only go if accompanied by a parent or guardian. Unlike Hoffman Estates, West Allis provided for criminal penalties, with fines and jail time.

"It is clear that the opinion in Hoffman Estates establishes a method—though it does not necessarily dictate a result—for judging the facial constitutionality of all such ordinances," Cummings wrote. After reiterating the Court's holding that the overbreadth doctrine did not reach commercial speech, he moved on to the vagueness question. West Allis's ordinance demanded "a somewhat more searching examination," due to the criminal penalties involved, although he admitted the Supreme Court had treated Hoffman Estates' ordinance as "quasi-criminal." West Allis's also governed paraphernalia transactions between individuals, further heightening the standard of review.

Cummings described the quandary faced by anyone creating these ordinances:

The difficulty that has plagued draftsmen of drug paraphernalia ordinances is how to control traffic in drug-related equipment without also proscribing wholly innocent conduct. Mirrors, spoons, pipes, and cigarette papers are all multiple-purpose items. A statute that has no ambiguities will reach only the most obvious items of drug paraphernalia, while a statute that casts a broader net may be too vague.

Both Hoffman Estates and West Allis had sought to overcome that issue by a licensing scheme and a geographical limit to the prohibition, respectively. But "[t]hese legislative strategies do not really solve the problem," Cummings observed, as it was the definition of paraphernalia that was still the fundamental issue in a vagueness review.

West Allis used the language "designed for use or intended for use with illegal drugs" in its ordinance. It pointed to five factors that could be used to answer that question: whether the business had a license to sell tobacco products, expert testimony as to use, the proportion of such sales to the total sales of the business, national and local advertising for the product and local advertising for the store. "Far from curing vagueness, these factors seem to us to exacerbate it," Cummings wrote. Only three had any bearing on the seller's intent, the fourth would only if manufacturers deliberately advertised their product for illegal use, and the second seemed capable of overriding any inferences that might be drawn from the others. "These factors, which are both general and unweighted, invite inquiry into areas of doubtful relevance rather than make the prohibited conduct any clearer."

Cummings believed that they would encourage arbitrary enforcement, which he defined in this case as "enforcement that leaves to the arresting or prosecuting authorities the job of determining, essentially without legislative guidance, what the prohibited offense is." Unlike Hoffman Estates' ordinance, West Allis's focused on the use of the items rather than its marketing. In addition to the criticisms he had already made, he said that some of the five factors "just shift the uncertainty from one area to another."

West Allis did, however, win on one complaint. Cummings found that the ordinance did not violate the Equal Protection Clause, reversing the district court. While the fave factors were impermissibly vague, they were not so imprecise as to fail the rational basis test. "[I]n deciding what means to employ," he wrote, "[West Allis City Council] can rely on actual or hypothetical facts, and can attack only certain aspects of a problem without having to justify its failure to fashion a comprehensive solution." He approvingly quoted the words of former Supreme Court justice William O. Douglas to similar effect: "[T]he law need not be in every respect logically consistent with its aims to be constitutional. It is enough that there is an evil at hand for correction, and that it might be thought that the particular legislative measure was a rational way to correct it."

After reversing that holding, Cummings disposed of the case by remanding it to district court and invoking the ordinance's severability provisions. The new proceedings should ask West Allis which direction it would prefer to go with a revised ordinance. "[W]ould it rather retain the sound provisions of this statute and deal separately with the paraphernalia problems, or would it prefer to begin again with a more specifically drawn ordinance covering both paraphernalia and simulated drugs?"

In Hoffman Estates, Pell began his dissent, "the Court seemed to put to rest the idea that municipalities could not, in an endeavor to retard the growing menace of drug abuse, legislate against the activities of the so-called head shops without running afoul of Constitutional prohibitions." He felt that the differences between the two ordinances were "matters of form rather than substance ... [T]he majority opinion appears to be straining unduly to distinguish [them]."

Pell called the West Allis ordinance "a sensible and pragmatic approach, within constitutional limitations." While the majority had used a higher standard of review owing to the criminal nature of the ordinance, he reminded them that the Court had called the Hoffman Estates ordinance "quasi-criminal" and held it to the same higher standard. It had approved it, and "[t]he same result, in my opinion, is necessary here." To him, the majority's distinction of the West Allis ordinance as reaching beyond economic or business activity missed the point:

... [T]he prohibited activities are not those which are indulged in at social gatherings in a home or at picnics in the park but are those which occur on business premises. It is true that the ordinance by its terms is applicable to flesh and blood individuals as well as to various artificial legal entities. This simply means, as I see it, that the ordinance applies to the sales clerk as well as the corporate employer. In other words, the agent as well as the principal may be charged with the violation, one on the ground of actual participation and the other because of respondeat superior.

"I simply fail to comprehend," Pell continued, "the reasoning of the majority that the phrase 'intended for use' is broader than 'marketed for use' and therefore somehow becomes vague, although 'marketed for use' is 'transparently clear' with regard to intention," as the Supreme Court had written. In fact, he remarked, Hoffman Estates treated the two phrases as more or less identical, since marketing for a use implied an intention for that use.

Pell did not find anything unconstitutional with the factors. "[They] do tend to make the prohibited conduct quite clear." He elaborated:

Concern is implicit in the ordinance that the merchandiser of innocent objects normally traded to the general public not run afoul of the ordinance and attention is directed to legitimate businesses such as the registered dealer of tobacco products. Clairvoyance should not be needed to know whether advertising is slanted toward one group of purchasers or another and no doubt that is the reason the majority opinion endeavors, albeit unsuccessfully in my opinion, to relegate the West Allis ordinance to a non-economical status.

Lastly, he dismissed the arbitrary-enforcement concern since he felt that West Allis could follow Hoffman Estates' example and administratively narrow or clarify the ordinance. "In candor, I am compelled to conclude that we are involved in a stream of words and an implication of meanings which distort the plain, simple, and easily comprehendible language of this ordinance."

=== In other cases ===
Outside the wave of drug-paraphernalia ordinances and statutes challenged in federal courts in its wake, Hoffman Estates has not been significantly revisited by courts at any level, though it has played a significant role in some later analyses outside that area. The Colorado Supreme Court clarified what it called "the Flipside test" for determining the standard of a vagueness review in its 1988 case Parrish v. Lamm. There, two chiropractors had challenged a new state law criminalizing as "abuse of health care" the practice by some health care providers of waiving a patient's health insurance copayment and/or deductible, or advertising that they did so.

Justice Anthony Vollack wrote for a unanimous court that there were four components to the test: whether the statute was an economic regulation, whether it was civil or criminal, had a scienter component or was overbroad. The lower court had found all four were applicable and struck the law down; the chiropractors that if any of the factors were present the stricter standard of review should apply. "[A] mere tally ... will not suffice," responded Vollack. He considered the overbreadth factor to be the most important and, finding for the state on that one and two of the other three, held the statute was not unconstitutionally vague.

==== Roark & Hardee L.P. v. City of Austin ====
Changes in society since Hoffman Estates were reflected in, Roark & Hardee L.P. et al v. City of Austin, the most recent case to rely on it as a significant precedent. In a 2005 referendum, the voters of Austin, Texas, approved a smoking ban in indoor public places within the city. The plaintiffs, owners of several city bars, filed suit in the Western District of Texas seeking to have the ordinance overturned on several grounds, including vagueness.

Judge Sam Sparks issued a preliminary injunction barring the city from enforcing the ordinance after finding it imposed a higher fine than state law allowed and lacking in a review procedure. Between that time and trial a year later, the city issued several sets of guidelines on the "necessary steps" a business must take to prevent smoking within its premises, a phrase which had been attacked by the plaintiffs as particularly vague. Further, the city had issued violation notices to two of the plaintiffs. Sparks believed these factors made the case more urgent and made his preliminary injunction permanent.

The city appealed to the Fifth Circuit. In 2008 a panel ruled in its favor on all the issues. Carolyn Dineen King, writing for the court, cited Hoffman Estates as laying the procedure for a facial vagueness challenge.

Per it, King had to start with a First Amendment issue. The plaintiffs had argued that one of the "necessary steps", that they ask customers not to smoke, was compelled speech. She rejected that argument: "[T]his speech is plainly incidental to the ordinance's regulation of conduct. After all, the guidelines were amended to include these verbal requirements only after Plaintiffs 'allegedly' experienced difficulty in implementing the ordinance."

Next, King considered whether the ordinance was vague in all its possible applications. She held it significant that the guidelines had been drawn up by the city in response to business concerns, giving it a point of similarity with the Hoffman Estates ordinance and the Court's holding that the ability to clarify justified a less strict vagueness standard. But "to be safe", she wrote, the court was applying the stricter standards for criminal ordinances.

The guidelines were of even more importance, wrote King, since unlike Hoffman Estates, the ordinance had been passed by voters rather than city council and Austin's city charter forbade such initiatives from being amended or repealed for two years. The amended guidelines, she continued, "essentially provide plaintiff bar owners and operators a clear 'how to' guide for avoiding a violation under the 'necessary steps' provision." And some of those plaintiffs had not only received multiple notices of violation but seemed to be trying to find loopholes in it, such as making patrons sign written forms confirming that they had been instructed not to smoke inside but otherwise not discouraging them from doing so, and putting empty candleholders on tables instead of ashtrays. Inspectors who cited the bars for violations also circled steps that were not taken when providing notice. "[I]n light of the evidence at trial, Plaintiffs fail to demonstrate that the 'necessary steps' provision is so indefinite as to provide them with no standard of conduct at all."

== Analysis and commentary ==
A few months after the decision, James Atkins wrote a short article it in the Campbell Law Review. Most of his text was descriptive, but at the end he offered some analysis, finding the Court's methods more important than its holding. "This method facilitates a decision that falls comfortably in line with those decisions since Nebbia v. New York in which the Court has deferred to the legitimate exercise of public policy formation by state and local legislatures, particularly with regard to issues concerning public welfare."

"With respect to the constitutional challenges raised by Flipside," Atkins wrote, "the Court has adopted a sliding-scale standard of permissibility which is measured against the conduct or activity addressed by the statute under challenge. Presumably, the Court is saying that varying degrees of overbreadth or vagueness are required to invalidate different enactments."

Lastly, Atkins wrote, it was a reaffirmation of the Burger Court's "basic policy of noninterference by the judiciary in the exercise of legislative judgment in this area of the law." He said it was clear that the Court had committed itself to an as-applied approach to any future cases arising from drug-paraphernalia laws. As a result of the holding and the Burger Court's policy, he predicted courts would be considering fewer such cases in the future.

Many years later, in 2011, John Marshall Law School professor Thomas Regnier criticized Hoffman Estates as prematurely foreclosing constitutional challenges to still-problematic drug-parpahernalia laws in an article in New York University's Journal of Legislation and Public Policy. The village's responses to questions at oral argument suggest they were using the DEA's model ordinance, which had by then been criticized as too vague, as a model, Regnier writes. One of Hoffman Estates' guidelines, that sales of white rolling paper were permitted but not its colored counterpart, came in for some heavy criticism. "[It] sent a clear message to consumers: roll your joints with white papers."

In dismissing The Flipside's overbreadth claims, Regnier notes, the Court's analysis was particularly deficient due to an oversight on the record store's part:

[It] assumed that all drug-related literature located near paraphernalia encouraged the use of illegal drugs. But what about literature that merely advocates legalization of a currently illegal drug? Wouldn't that be protected political speech? It is not clear from the Court's analysis that this type of literature would be safe from regulation. Political literature itself could not be prohibited, but merchants would be discouraged from displaying it for fear that the tobacco pipes and papers that they were also selling would suddenly become drug paraphernalia. This result is the kind of "chilling" effect that the overbreadth doctrine is designed to remedy, but, unfortunately, Flipside never raised the political speech issue, so the Court did not address it.

Regnier criticized the Court's vagueness analysis as, ultimately, circular.

The Court found that the "designed for use" standard referred to items that were principally used with illegal drugs by virtue of objective features that were designed by the manufacturer. "Designed for use" could refer only to the manufacturer's intent, not the retailer's or customer's. But what "objective features" may clue one in to the manufacturer's intent? The Court did not say. The Court also found it clear that items "principally used" for nondrug purposes, such as ordinary tobacco pipes, were not "designed for use" with illegal drugs. In other words, consumer use of an object determines what the manufacturer intended for the object when he designed it.

This, Regnier continued, makes Hoffman Estates part of a general pattern of cases where constitutional concerns the Court has used proactively in other situations are often dismissed by it when the case involves drug-law enforcement, a criticism made as well by Justice John Paul Stevens, who called the Court "a loyal foot soldier in the Executive's fight against [drugs]" in a 1991 dissent. He contrasts the Court's willingness to let the village clarify its ordinance with Papachristou v. Jacksonville, where it struck down an anti-vagrancy ordinance that used a number of terms for those targeted that were nevertheless insufficiently defined. "In short, the Supreme Court in Flipside would have none of this hairsplitting about whether one could adequately define drug paraphernalia—not if it would prevent American communities from combating the scourge of drugs," he wrote. "We know it when we see it, the Court seemed to say," alluding to Justice Potter Stewart's famous definition of hard-core pornography in Jacobellis v. Ohio.

After Hoffman Estates, Regnier observes, no business challenged a drug-paraphernalia ordinance on constitutional grounds, despite what he believes were unresolved issues in many, particular those that followed the DEA model. "It is unfortunate that the Supreme Court saw fit to uphold such a poorly written piece of legislation as the Village ordinance," he writes. He points to subsequent prosecutions such as Operation Pipe Dreams in the early 20th century, in which comedian Tommy Chong wound up serving several months in prison for his supposedly promotional role in his son's bong-dealing business after his past drug humor was introduced at his sentencing, as demonstrating the chilling effect originally feared by Flipside and the other paraphernalia dealers. "For these reasons, drug paraphernalia is a more appropriate subject for civil regulation than criminal prosecution."

== See also ==
- List of United States Supreme Court cases by the Burger Court
- List of United States Supreme Court cases involving the First Amendment
- List of United States Supreme Court cases, volume 455
