= Disorderly conduct =

Criminal charge in many countries

Disorderly conduct is a crime in some jurisdictions such as the United States and China. Typically, "disorderly conduct" is a term used to refer to any behavior that is considered unacceptable in a formal, civilized or controlled environment. Many types of unruly conduct may fit the definition of disorderly conduct, as such statutes are often used as "catch-all" crimes. Police may use a disorderly conduct charge to keep the peace when people are behaving in a disruptive manner, but otherwise present no danger.

Disorderly conduct is typically classified as an infraction or misdemeanor in the United States. However, in certain circumstances (e.g., when committed in an airport, a park, a government office building, or near a funeral) it may be a felony in some US states.

== United States ==
=== Definitions ===
A basic definition of disorderly conduct defines the offense as:

A person who recklessly, knowingly, or intentionally:

(1) engages in fighting or in tumultuous conduct;
(2) makes unreasonable noise and continues to do so after being asked to stop; or
(3) disrupts a lawful assembly of persons;

commits disorderly conduct. . .

Indiana's definition of "disorderly conduct" is modeled after the Model Penal Code's definition, and is typical, but not identical, to similar laws on the statute books of other U.S. states. It covers a large variety of potential acts in its prohibition. "Fighting" is perhaps the clearest act within the scope of its prohibition, and "tumultuous conduct" is "conduct [...] likely to result in serious bodily injury to a person or substantial damage to property." But exactly what constitutes "tumultuous conduct", "unreasonable noise", or "disrupt[ing] a lawful assembly" are matters that are far harder to decide, and as such disorderly conduct statutes give police officers and other authorities fairly broad discretion to arrest people whose activities they find undesirable for a wide variety of reasons. This extremely vague definition of "disorderly conduct" is often criticised as infringing upon the First Amendment. Potential punishments include a jail term, fine, probation, restraining orders, or community service.

In some jurisdictions, wearing a mask in public may constitute disorderly conduct.

==== Federal ====
The federal regulations about disorderly conduct:

- (a) A person commits disorderly conduct when, with intent to cause public alarm, nuisance, jeopardy or violence, or knowingly or recklessly creating a risk thereof, such person commits any of the following prohibited acts:
  - (1) Engages in fighting or threatening, or in violent behavior.
  - (2) Uses language, an utterance, or gesture, or engages in a display or act that is obscene, physically threatening or menacing, or done in a manner that is likely to inflict injury or incite an immediate breach of the peace.
  - (3) Makes noise that is unreasonable, considering the nature and purpose of the actor's conduct, location, time of day or night, and other factors that would govern the conduct of a reasonably prudent person under the circumstances.
  - (4) Creates or maintains a hazardous or physically offensive condition.
- (b) The regulations contained in this section apply, regardless of land ownership, on all lands and waters within a park area that are under the legislative jurisdiction of the United States.

=== Interpretation ===
U.S. courts confronted with cases stemming from disorderly conduct arrests have from time to time had occasion to restrict the broad and vague definitions of the statute to make certain that freedom of speech and assembly and other forms of protected expression under the First Amendment were not affected. Common law jurisdictions have accumulated precedents that refine interpretation of vague statutes. Courts have had occasion to curb its scope to make certain that people were (or could have been) aware that their conduct was, in fact, within the prohibition of the statute, as required by the due process clause of the Fourteenth Amendment. However, no court has struck down a disorderly conduct statute as being per se unconstitutionally vague or overbroad. Courts have been willing to strike down vagrancy ordinances which are nearly as vague and do not give adequate warning.

California Penal Code § 415 which is similar to the Model Penal Code reiteration above actually concerns disturbing the peace. However, in California disorderly conduct (California Penal Code § 647) lists what acts constitute disorderly conduct.

Section 647: Every person who commits any of the following acts is guilty of disorderly conduct, a misdemeanor

(a) Who solicits anyone to engage in or who engages in lewd or dissolute conduct in any public place or in any place open to the public or exposed to public view.

(b) Who solicits or who agrees to engage in or who engages in any act of prostitution. A person agrees to engage in an act of prostitution when, with specific intent to so engage, they manifest an acceptance of an offer or solicitation to so engage, regardless of whether the offer or solicitation was made by a person who also possessed the specific intent to engage in prostitution. No agreement to engage in an act of prostitution shall constitute a violation of this subdivision unless some act, in addition to the agreement, is done within this state in furtherance of the commission of an act of prostitution by the person agreeing to engage in that act. As used in this subdivision, "prostitution" includes any lewd act between persons for money or other consideration.

(c) Who accosts other persons in any public place or in any place open to the public for the purpose of begging or soliciting alms.

(d) Who loiters in or about any toilet open to the public for the purpose of engaging in or soliciting any lewd or lascivious or any unlawful act.

(e) Who lodges in any building, structure, vehicle, or place, whether public or private, without the permission of the owner or person entitled to the possession or in control of it.

(f) Who is found in any public place under the influence of intoxicating liquor, any drug, controlled substance, toluene, or any combination of any intoxicating liquor, drug, controlled substance, or toluene, in a condition that they are unable to exercise care for their own safety or the safety of others, or by reason of their being under the influence of intoxicating liquor, any drug, controlled substance, toluene, or any combination of any intoxicating liquor, drug, or toluene, interferes with or obstructs or prevents the free use of any street, sidewalk, or other public way.

(h) Who loiters, prowls, or wanders upon the private property of another, at any time, without visible or lawful business with the owner or occupant. As used in this subdivision, "loiter" means to delay or linger without a lawful purpose for being on the property and for the purpose of committing a crime as opportunity may be discovered.

(i) Who, while loitering, prowling, or wandering upon the private property of another, at any time, peeks in the door or window of any inhabited building or structure, without visible or lawful business with the owner or occupant.

(j) (1) Any person who looks through a hole or opening, into, or otherwise views, by means of any instrumentality, including, but not limited to, a periscope, telescope, binoculars, camera, motion picture camera, or camcorder, the interior of a bedroom, bathroom, changing room, fitting room, dressing room, or tanning booth, or the interior of any other area in which the occupant has a reasonable expectation of privacy, with the intent to invade the privacy of a person or persons inside. This subdivision shall not apply to those areas of a private business used to count currency or other negotiable instruments.

== Mainland China ==
=== Criminal law ===
Articles 277 to 304 of the Criminal Law of the People's Republic of China, revised and promulgated on 14 March 1997 and effective as of 1 October 1997, criminalize many kinds of disorderly conducts in the jurisdiction of the People's Republic of China.

=== Administrative law ===
Articles 23 to 29 of the Law of the People's Republic of China on Penalties for Administration of Public Security, adopted and promulgated on 28 August 2005 and effective as of 1 March 2006, administratively penalize non-criminal disorderly conducts in mainland China.

== Taiwan ==
=== Criminal law ===
Effective on 1 July 1935, Articles 149 to 160 of the Criminal Code of the Republic of China criminalize many kinds of disorderly conducts in the jurisdiction of the Republic of China, which has shifted to Taiwan since 1949.

==== Administrative law ====
Promulgated on 29 June 1991, Articles 63 to 79 of the Social Order Maintenance Act administratively penalize non-criminal disorderly conducts in Taiwan.

== See also ==
- Hooliganism, term used for a similar offense in some other jurisdictions
- Obscenity (law)
- Public-order crime
- Peace (law)
- Trespass
- Thought crime
- Victimless crime
- Freedom of speech
- Picking quarrels and provoking trouble
