= Fex v. Michigan =

- Supreme Court of the United States

Decided February 23, 1993
- Full case name: Fex v. Michigan
- Citations: 507 U.S. 43 (more)

Holding
- The IAD's statute of limitations for bringing a case against an incarcerated person who gives notice to a forum state that they are incarcerated in another state begins after the notice letter has been received by the forum state's prosecution.

Court membership
- Chief Justice William Rehnquist Associate Justices Byron White · Harry Blackmun; John P. Stevens · Sandra Day O'Connor; Antonin Scalia · Anthony Kennedy; David Souter · Clarence Thomas

Case opinions
- Majority: Scalia
- Dissent: Blackmun, joined by Stevens

Laws applied
- Interstate Agreement on Detainers

Fex v. Michigan, 507 U.S. 43 (1993), was a United States Supreme Court case in which the court held that the Interstate Agreement on Detainers's statute of limitation for bringing a case against an incarcerated person who gives notice to a forum state that they are incarcerated in another state begins after the notice letter has been received by the forum state's prosecution.

== Background ==
=== The prison mailbox rule ===
Incarcerated people do not have the ability to send their own mail to courts, and their lawyers are not allowed to file on their behalf either. Their ability to make filings is entirely dependent upon their prison's mail department, which is not under any obligation to send mail immediately. Over the years, this has created various mailbox rule issues where courts must decide if the message is considered received by the courts when the incarcerated person gives the letter to the mail department or when the letter arrives at its destination. The principal Supreme Court case on this matter is Houston v. Lacks, which held that a letter is considered "filed" for courts' purposes when the incarcerated person gives the letter to the mail department.

=== The dispute ===
Indiana and Michigan are parties to the Interstate Agreement on Detainers (IAD). Article III(a) of the IAD provides that a person who is incarcerated in a party state may notify the prosecutor and the appropriate court of another party state—the forum state—that they have a pending charge in the forum state's jurisdiction. The incarcerated person must be brought to trial within 180 days "after he shall have caused [that notice] to be delivered".

Fex, a person incarcerated in Indiana, was brought to trial in Michigan 196 days after he gave such a request to Indiana prison authorities and 177 days after the request was received by the Michigan prosecutor. His pretrial motion pursuant to Article V(c) of the IAD, which provides for dismissal with prejudice if trial does not commence within the 180-day period, was denied on the ground that the statutory period did not begin until the Michigan prosecutor received his request. His conviction was set aside by the Michigan Court of Appeals, which held that the 180-day period was triggered by transmittal of his request to the Indiana officials. The Michigan Supreme Court summarily reversed.

== Opinion of the court ==
The Supreme Court issued an opinion on February 23, 1993.

Justice Blackmun dissented. He criticized the majority for focusing on two contended interpretations centered on the words "caused" and "delivered" when the statute said the clock started when "he" (i.e., the incarcerated person) acted. Blackmun said, "The focus is on the prisoner's act, and that act is complete when he transmits his request to the warden. That is the last time at which the inmate can be said to have done anything to 'have caused to be delivered' the request. Any other reading renders the words 'he shall have caused' superfluous."

== Later developments ==
Fex controls the interstate administration of this matter for states that opt into the IAD. However, a state may have an intrastate process for the same matter, and that process would have a mailbox rule issue that Fex does not necessarily control. Washington State briefly diverged from Fex for its intrastate process when the Washington Court of Appeals decided to follow the reasoning in Blackmun's Fex dissent. However, the Washington Supreme Court reversed and imposed Fex on the intrastate process, saying "consistency seems more desirable here than confusion".
