= List of United States Supreme Court cases, volume 507 =

This is a list of all the United States Supreme Court cases from volume 507 of the United States Reports:

| Case name | Citation | Date decided |
|---|---|---|
| United States v. Nachtigal | 507 U.S. 1 | 1993 |
| United States v. Louisiana | 507 U.S. 7 | 1993 |
| Growe v. Emison | 507 U.S. 25 | 1993 |
| Fex v. Michigan | 507 U.S. 43 | 1993 |
| Itel Containers Int'l Corp. v. Huddleston | 507 U.S. 60 | 1993 |
| United States v. Dunnigan | 507 U.S. 87 | 1993 |
| Negonsott v. Samuels | 507 U.S. 99 | 1993 |
| United States v. Parcel of Rumson, N. J., Land | 507 U.S. 111 | 1993 |
| Voinovich v. Quilter | 507 U.S. 146 | 1993 |
| Leatherman v. Tarrant Cnty. Narcotics Intelligence & Coordination Unit | 507 U.S. 163 | 1993 |
| Reves v. Ernst & Young | 507 U.S. 170 | 1993 |
| Smith v. United States | 507 U.S. 197 | 1993 |
| Building & Constr. Trades Council v. Associated Builders & Contractors | 507 U.S. 218 | 1993 |
| Ortega-Rodriguez v. United States | 507 U.S. 234 | 1993 |
| Reiter v. Cooper | 507 U.S. 258 | 1993 |
| Delo v. Lashley | 507 U.S. 272 | 1993 |
| Demos v. Storrie | 507 U.S. 290 | 1993 |
| Reno v. Flores | 507 U.S. 292 | 1993 |
| Saudi Arabia v. Nelson | 507 U.S. 349 | 1993 |
| Pioneer Investment Services Co. v. Brunswick Associates Ltd. Partnership | 507 U.S. 380 | 1993 |
| Cincinnati v. Discovery Network, Inc. | 507 U.S. 410 | 1993 |
| United States v. McDermott | 507 U.S. 447 | 1993 |
| Arave v. Creech | 507 U.S. 463 | 1993 |
| Delaware v. New York | 507 U.S. 490 | 1993 |
| Conroy v. Aniskoff | 507 U.S. 511 | 1993 |
| United States v. Texas | 507 U.S. 529 | 1993 |
| United States v. Green | 507 U.S. 545 | 1993 |
| Newark Morning Ledger Co. v. United States | 507 U.S. 546 | 1993 |
| Nebraska v. Wyoming | 507 U.S. 584 | 1993 |
| Hazen Paper Co. v. Biggins | 507 U.S. 604 | 1993 |
| Brecht v. Abrahamson | 507 U.S. 619 | 1993 |
| CSX Transp., Inc. v. Easterwood | 507 U.S. 658 | 1993 |
| Withrow v. Williams | 507 U.S. 680 | 1993 |
| United States v. Olano | 507 U.S. 725 | 1993 |
| United States v. California | 507 U.S. 746 | 1993 |
| Edenfield v. Fane | 507 U.S. 761 | 1993 |
| Turner Broadcasting System, Inc. v. FCC | 507 U.S. 1301 | 1993 |
