= Due Process Clause =

Clauses in the 5th and 14th Amendments to the U.S. Constitution

Due Process Clauses are found in the Fifth and Fourteenth Amendments to the United States Constitution. They prohibit the deprivation of "life, liberty, or property" by the federal and state governments, respectively, without due process of law.

The U.S. Supreme Court interprets these clauses to guarantee a variety of protections: procedural due process (in civil and criminal proceedings); substantive due process (a guarantee of some fundamental rights); a prohibition against vague laws; incorporation of the Bill of Rights to state governments; and equal protection under the laws of the federal government.

== Text ==
The clause in the Fifth Amendment to the United States Constitution provides:

No person shall ... be deprived of life, liberty, or property, without due process of law.

The clause in Section One of the Fourteenth Amendment to the United States Constitution provides:

... nor shall any State deprive any person of life, liberty, or property, without due process of law.

== Background ==
Clause 39 of the original (1215) Magna Carta provided:

No free man shall be seized or imprisoned, or stripped of his rights or possessions, or outlawed or exiled, or deprived of his standing in any other way, nor will we proceed with force against him, or send others to do so, except by the lawful judgment of his equals or by the law of the land.

Clause 29 of the 1297 Magna Carta, the edition that was in force at the time of independence and still in force today in England and Wales, reads, in its official translation in The Statutes of the Realm:

NO Freeman shall be taken or imprisoned, or be disseised of his Freehold, or Liberties, or free Customs, or be outlawed, or exiled, or any other wise destroyed; nor will We not pass upon him, nor condemn him, but by lawful judgment of his Peers, or by the Law of the Land. We will sell to no man, we will not deny or defer to any man either Justice or Right.

The phrase "due process of law" first appeared in a statutory rendition of Magna Carta in 1354 during the reign of Edward III of England, as follows:

Item, That no Man of what Estate or Condition that he be, shall be put out of Land or Tenement, nor taken, nor imprisoned, nor disinherited, nor put to Death, without being brought in Answer by due Process of the Law.

== Drafting ==
New York was the only state that asked Congress to add "due process" language to the U.S. Constitution. New York ratified the U.S. Constitution and proposed the following amendment in 1788:

[N]o Person ought to be taken imprisoned or disseized of his freehold, or be exiled or deprived of his Privileges, Franchises, Life, Liberty or Property but by due process of Law.

In response to this proposal from New York, James Madison drafted a due process clause for Congress. Madison cut out some language and inserted the word without, which had not been proposed by New York. Congress then adopted the exact wording that Madison proposed after Madison explained that the due process clause would not be sufficient to protect various other rights:

Although I know whenever the great rights, the trial by jury, freedom of the press, or liberty of conscience, come in question in that body [Parliament], the invasion of them is resisted by able advocates, yet their Magna Carta does not contain any one provision for the security of those rights, respecting which the people of America are most alarmed.

== Interpretation ==
=== Scope ===
The Supreme Court has interpreted the Due Process Clauses in the Fifth and Fourteenth Amendment identically, as Justice Felix Frankfurter once explained in a concurring opinion:

To suppose that 'due process of law' meant one thing in the Fifth Amendment and another in the Fourteenth is too frivolous to require elaborate rejection.

In 1855, the Supreme Court explained that, to ascertain whether a process is due process, the first step is to "examine the constitution itself, to see whether this process be in conflict with any of its provisions". In the same 1855 case, the Supreme Court said,

The words, "due process of law", were undoubtedly intended to convey the same meaning as the words, "by the law of the land", in Magna Charta.

In the 1884 case of Hurtado v. California, the Court said:

Due process of law in the [Fourteenth Amendment] refers to that law of the land ... in each state which derives its authority from the inherent and reserved powers of the state, exerted within the limits of those fundamental principles of liberty and justice which lie at the base of all our civil and political institutions, and the greatest security for which resides in the right of the people to make their own laws, and alter them at their pleasure.

Due process also applies to the creation of taxing districts, as taxation is a deprivation of property. Due process typically requires public hearings prior to the creation of a taxing district.

Justice Antonin Scalia wrote "it is well established that the Fifth Amendment entitles aliens [non-citizens] to due process of law in deportation proceedings." in a concurring opinion on the case Reno v. Flores, 507 U.S. 292 (1993) relating to illegal or undocumented immigrants.

=== "State" ===
Due process applies to U.S. territories, although they are not States.

=== "Person" ===
The Due Process Clauses apply to both natural persons, including citizens and non-citizens, as well as to "legal persons" (that is, corporate personhood). The Fifth Amendment's Due Process Clause was first applied to corporations in 1893 by the Supreme Court in Noble v. Union River Logging R. Co. Noble was preceded by Santa Clara County v. Southern Pacific Railroad in 1886. The Due Process Clauses apply to non-citizens within the United States – no matter whether their presence may be or is "unlawful, involuntary or transitory" – although the U.S. Supreme Court has recognized that non-citizens can be stopped, detained, and denied past immigration officials at points of entry (e.g. at a port or airport) without the protection of the Due Process Clause because, while technically on U.S. soil, they are not considered to have entered the United States.

=== "Life" ===
In Bucklew v. Precythe, 587 U.S. 119 (2019), the Supreme Court held that the Due Process Clause expressly allows the death penalty in the United States because "the Fifth Amendment, added to the Constitution at the same time as the Eighth, expressly contemplates that a defendant may be tried for a 'capital' crime and 'deprived of life' as a penalty, so long as proper procedures are followed".

=== "Liberty" ===
The U.S. Supreme Court has interpreted the term "liberty" in the Due Process Clauses broadly:

Although the Court has not assumed to define "liberty" with any great precision, that term is not confined to mere freedom from bodily restraint. Liberty under law extends to the full range of conduct which the individual is free to pursue, and it cannot be restricted except for a proper governmental objective.

Courts will often discuss a right under the Due Process Clause in terms of a "liberty interest" created by the constitution, a statute, or inherent in being a person.

=== State actor ===
The prohibitions of the due process clauses apply only to the actions of state actors and not against private citizens. However, "[p]rivate persons, jointly engaged with state officials in the prohibited action, are acting 'under color' of law. ... To act 'under color' of law does not require that the accused be an officer of the State. It is enough that he is a willful participant in joint activity with the State or its agents".

=== Procedural due process ===
Procedural due process requires government officials to follow fair procedures before depriving a person of life, liberty, or property. When the government seeks to deprive a person of one of those interests, procedural due process requires the government to afford the person, at minimum, notice, an opportunity to be heard, and a decision made by a neutral decisionmaker.

This protection extends to all government proceedings that can result in an individual's deprivation, whether civil or criminal in nature, from parole violation hearings to administrative hearings regarding government benefits and entitlements to full-blown criminal trials. The article "Some Kind of Hearing" written by Judge Henry Friendly created a list of basic due process rights "that remains highly influential, as to both content and relative priority". These rights, which apply equally to civil due process and criminal due process, are:

1. An unbiased tribunal.
2. Notice of the proposed action and the grounds asserted for it.
3. Opportunity to present reasons why the proposed action should not be taken.
4. The right to present evidence, including the right to call witnesses.
5. The right to know opposing evidence.
6. The right to cross-examine adverse witnesses.
7. A decision based exclusively on the evidence presented.
8. Opportunity to be represented by counsel.
9. Requirement that the tribunal prepare a record of the evidence presented.
10. Requirement that the tribunal prepare written findings of fact and reasons for its decision.

==== Civil procedural due process ====
Procedural due process is essentially based on the concept of "fundamental fairness". For example, in 1934, the United States Supreme Court held that due process is violated "if a practice or rule offends some principle of justice so rooted in the traditions and conscience of our people as to be ranked as fundamental". As construed by the courts, it includes an individual's right to be adequately notified of charges or proceedings, the opportunity to be heard at these proceedings, and that the person or panel making the final decision over the proceedings be impartial in regards to the matter before them.

To put it more simply, where an individual is facing a deprivation of life, liberty, or property, procedural due process mandates that they are entitled to adequate notice, a hearing, and a neutral judge.

The Supreme Court has formulated a balancing test to determine the rigor with which the requirements of procedural due process should be applied to a particular deprivation, for the obvious reason that mandating such requirements in the most expansive way for even the most minor deprivations would bring the machinery of government to a halt. The Court set out the test as follows: "[I]dentification of the specific dictates of due process generally requires consideration of three distinct factors: first, the private interest that will be affected by the official action; second, the risk of an erroneous deprivation of such interest through the procedures used, and the probable value, if any, of additional or substitute procedural safeguards; and, finally, the Government's interest, including the function involved and the fiscal and administrative burdens that the additional or substitute procedural requirement would entail."

Procedural due process has also been an important factor in the development of the law of personal jurisdiction, in the sense that it is inherently unfair for the judicial machinery of a state to take away the property of a person who has no connection to it whatsoever. A significant portion of U.S. constitutional law is therefore directed to what kinds of connections to a state are enough for that state's assertion of jurisdiction over a nonresident to comport with procedural due process.

The requirement of a neutral judge has introduced a constitutional dimension to the question of whether a judge should recuse themself from a case. Specifically, the Supreme Court has ruled that in certain circumstances, the Due Process Clause of the Fourteenth Amendment requires a judge to recuse themself on account of a potential or actual conflict of interest. For example, in Caperton v. A. T. Massey Coal Co. (2009), the Court ruled that a justice of the Supreme Court of Appeals of West Virginia could not participate in a case involving a major donor to his election to that court.

==== Criminal procedural due process ====
In criminal cases, many of these due process protections overlap with procedural protections provided by the Eighth Amendment to the United States Constitution, which guarantees reliable procedures that protect innocent people from being executed, which would be an obvious example of cruel and unusual punishment.

An example of criminal due process rights is the case Vitek v. Jones, 445 U.S. 480 (1980). The due process clause of the Fourteenth Amendment requires certain procedural protections for state prisoners who may be transferred involuntarily to a state mental hospital for treatment of a mental disease or defect, such protections including written notice of the transfer, an adversary hearing before an independent decision-maker, written findings, and effective and timely notice of such rights. As established by the district court and upheld by the U.S. Supreme Court in Vitek v. Jones, these due process rights include:

1. Written notice to the prisoner that a transfer to a mental hospital is being considered;
2. A hearing, sufficiently after the notice to permit the prisoner to prepare, at which disclosure to the prisoner is made of the evidence being relied upon for the transfer and at which an opportunity to be heard in person and to present documentary evidence is given;
3. An opportunity at the hearing to present testimony of witnesses by the defense and to confront and cross-examine witnesses called by the state, except upon a finding, not arbitrarily made, of good cause for not permitting such presentation, confrontation, or cross-examination;
4. An independent decision-maker;
5. A written statement by the fact-finder as to the evidence relied on and the reasons for transferring the inmate;
6. Availability of legal counsel, furnished by the state, if the inmate is financially unable to furnish his own (a majority of Justices rejected this right to state-furnished counsel.); and
7. Effective and timely notice of all the foregoing rights.

=== Substantive due process ===
By the middle of the 19th century, "due process of law" was interpreted by the U.S. Supreme Court to mean that "it was not left to the legislative power to enact any process which might be devised. The due process article is a restraint on the legislative as well as on the executive and judicial powers of the government, and cannot be so construed as to leave Congress free to make any process 'due process of law' by its mere will."

The term "substantive due process" (SDP) is commonly used in two ways: first to identify a particular line of case law, and second to signify a particular attitude toward judicial review under the Due Process Clause. The term "substantive due process" began to take form in 1930s legal casebooks as a categorical distinction of selected due process cases, and by 1950 had been mentioned twice in Supreme Court opinions. SDP involves liberty-based due process challenges which seek certain outcomes instead of merely contesting procedures and their effects; in such cases, the Supreme Court recognizes a constitutionally-based "liberty" which then renders laws seeking to limit said "liberty" either unenforceable or limited in scope. Critics of SDP decisions typically assert that those liberties ought to be left to the more politically accountable branches of government.

Courts have viewed the due process clause, and sometimes other clauses of the Constitution, as embracing those fundamental rights that are "implicit in the concept of ordered liberty". Just what those rights are is not always clear, nor is the Supreme Court's authority to enforce such unenumerated rights clear. Some of those rights have long histories or "are deeply rooted" in American society.

The courts have largely abandoned the Lochner era approach (c. 1897–1937) when substantive due process was used to strike down minimum wage and labor laws in order to protect freedom of contract. Since then, the Supreme Court has decided that numerous other freedoms that do not appear in the plain text of the Constitution are nevertheless protected by the Constitution. If these rights were not protected by the federal courts' doctrine of substantive due process, they could nevertheless be protected in other ways; for example, it is possible that some of these rights could be protected by other provisions of the state or federal constitutions, and alternatively they could be protected by legislatures.

The Court focuses on three types of rights under substantive due process in the Fourteenth Amendment, which originated in United States v. Carolene Products Co., 304 U.S. 144 (1938), footnote 4. Those three types of rights are:

- the first eight amendments in the Bill of Rights (e.g., the Eighth Amendment);
- restrictions on the political process (e.g., the rights of voting, association, and free speech); and
- the rights of "discrete and insular minorities". See U.S. V. Carolene Products Co. (1938).

The Court usually looks first to see if there is a fundamental right, by examining if the right can be found deeply rooted in American history and traditions. Where the right is not a fundamental right, the court applies a rational basis test: if the violation of the right can be rationally related to a legitimate government purpose, then the law is held valid. If the court establishes that the right being violated is a fundamental right, it applies strict scrutiny. This test inquires into whether there is a compelling state interest being furthered by the violation of the right, and whether the law in question is narrowly tailored to address the state interest.

Privacy, which is not explicitly mentioned in the Constitution, was at issue in Griswold v. Connecticut (1965), wherein the Court held that criminal prohibition of contraceptive devices for married couples violated federal, judicially enforceable privacy rights. The right to contraceptives was found in what the Court called the "penumbras", or shadowy edges, of certain amendments that arguably refer to certain privacy rights. The penumbra-based rationale of Griswold has since been discarded; the Supreme Court now uses the Due Process Clause as a basis for various unenumerated privacy rights. Although it has never been the majority view, some have argued that the Ninth Amendment (addressing unenumerated rights) could be used as a source of fundamental judicially enforceable rights, including a general right to privacy, as discussed by Justice Goldberg concurring in Griswold.

=== Void for vagueness ===
The courts have generally determined that laws which are too vague for the average citizen to understand deprive citizens of their rights to due process. If an average person cannot determine who is regulated, what conduct is prohibited, or what punishment may be imposed by a law, courts may find that law to be void for vagueness. See Coates v. Cincinnati, where the word "annoying" was deemed to lack due process insertion of fair warning.

=== Incorporation of the Bill of Rights ===
Incorporation is the legal doctrine by which the Bill of Rights, either in full or in part, is applied to the states through the Fourteenth Amendment's due process clause. The basis for incorporation is substantive due process regarding substantive rights enumerated elsewhere in the Constitution, and procedural due process regarding procedural rights enumerated elsewhere in the Constitution.

Incorporation started in 1897 with a takings case, continued with Gitlow v. New York (1925), which was a First Amendment case, and accelerated in the 1940s and 1950s. Justice Hugo Black famously favored the jot-for-jot incorporation of the entire Bill of Rights. Justice Felix Frankfurter, however—joined later by Justice John M. Harlan—felt that the federal courts should only apply those sections of the Bill of Rights that were "fundamental to a scheme of ordered liberty". It was the latter course that the Warren Court of the 1960s took, although almost all of the Bill of Rights has now been incorporated jot-for-jot against the states. The latest Incorporation is the Excessive Fines Clause of the Eighth Amendment; see Timbs v. Indiana, 586 U.S. 146 (2019).

The role of the incorporation doctrine in applying the guarantees of the Bill of Rights to the states is just as notable as the use of due process to define new fundamental rights that are not explicitly guaranteed by the Constitution's text. In both cases, the question has been whether the right asserted is "fundamental", so that, just as not all proposed "new" constitutional rights are afforded judicial recognition, not all provisions of the Bill of Rights have been deemed sufficiently fundamental to warrant enforcement against the states.

Some people, such as Justice Black, have argued that the Privileges or Immunities Clause of the Fourteenth Amendment would be a more appropriate textual source for the incorporation doctrine. The Court has not taken that course, and some point to the treatment given to the Privileges or Immunities Clause in the 1873 Slaughter-House Cases as a reason why. Although the Slaughter-House Court did not expressly preclude application of the Bill of Rights to the states, the clause largely ceased to be invoked in opinions of the Court following the Slaughter-House Cases, and when incorporation did begin, it was under the rubric of due process. Scholars who share Justice Black's view, such as Akhil Amar, argue that the Framers of the Fourteenth Amendment, like Senator Jacob Howard and Congressman John Bingham, included a Due Process Clause in the Fourteenth Amendment for the following reason: "By incorporating the rights of the Fifth Amendment, the privileges or immunities clause would ... have prevented states from depriving 'citizens' of due process. Bingham, Howard, and company wanted to go even further by extending the benefits of state due process to aliens."

The Supreme Court has consistently held that Fifth Amendment due process means substantially the same as Fourteenth Amendment due process, and therefore the original meaning of the former is relevant to the incorporation doctrine of the latter. When the Bill of Rights was originally proposed by Congress in 1789 to the states, various substantive and procedural rights were "classed according to their affinity to each other" instead of being submitted to the states "as a single act to be adopted or rejected in the gross", as James Madison put it. Roger Sherman explained in 1789 that each amendment "may be passed upon distinctly by the States, and any one that is adopted by three fourths of the legislatures may become a part of the Constitution". Thus, the states were allowed to reject the Sixth Amendment, for example, while ratifying all of the other amendments including the Due Process Clause; in that case, the rights in the Sixth Amendment would not have been incorporated against the federal government. The doctrine of incorporating the content of other amendments into "due process" was thus an innovation, when it began in 1925 with the Gitlow case, and this doctrine remains controversial today.

=== Reverse incorporation of equal protection ===
In Bolling v. Sharpe 347 U.S. 497 (1954), the Supreme Court held that "the concepts of equal protection and due process, both stemming from our American ideal of fairness, are not mutually exclusive." The Court thus interpreted the Fifth Amendment's due process clause to include an equal protection element. In Lawrence v. Texas the Supreme Court added: "Equality of treatment and the due process right to demand respect for conduct protected by the substantive guarantee of liberty are linked in important respects, and a decision on the latter point advances both interests."

=== Levels of scrutiny ===
When a law or other act of government is challenged as a violation of individual liberty under the due process clause, courts nowadays primarily use two forms of scrutiny, or judicial review, which is used by the Judicial Branch. This inquiry balances the importance of the governmental interest being served and the appropriateness of the government's method of implementation against the resulting infringement of individual rights. If the governmental action infringes upon a fundamental right, the highest level of review—strict scrutiny—is used. To pass strict scrutiny review, the law or act must be narrowly tailored to further a compelling government interest.

When the governmental restriction restricts liberty in a manner that does not implicate a fundamental right, rational basis review is used. Here a legitimate government interest is enough to pass this review. There is also a middle level of scrutiny, called intermediate scrutiny, but it is primarily used in Equal Protection cases rather than in Due Process cases.

=== Remedies ===
The Court held in 1967 (in Chapman v. California) that "we cannot leave to the States the formulation of the authoritative ... remedies designed to protect people from infractions by the States of federally guaranteed rights".

== Criticism ==
=== Substantive due process ===
Critics of a substantive due process often claim that the doctrine began, at the federal level, with the infamous 1857 slavery case of Dred Scott v. Sandford. However, other critics contend that substantive due process was not used by the federal judiciary until after the Fourteenth Amendment was adopted in 1869. Advocates of a substantive due process who assert that the doctrine was employed in Dred Scott claim that it was employed incorrectly. Additionally, the first appearance of a substantive due process as a concept arguably appeared earlier in the case of Bloomer v. McQuewan, 55 U.S. 539 (1852), so that Chief Justice Taney would not have been entirely breaking ground in his Dred Scott opinion when he pronounced the Missouri Compromise unconstitutional because, among other reasons, an "act of Congress that deprived a citizen of his liberty or property merely because he came himself or brought his property into a particular territory of the United States, and who had committed no offence against the laws, could hardly be dignified with the name of due process of law". Dissenting Justice Curtis disagreed with Taney about what "due process" meant in Dred Scott.

Criticisms of the doctrine continue as in the past. Critics argue that judges are making determinations of policy and morality that properly belong with legislators (i.e. "legislating from the bench"), or argue that judges are reading views into the Constitution that are not really implied by the document, or argue that judges are claiming the power to expand the liberty of some people at the expense of other people's liberty (e.g. as in the Dred Scott case), or argue that judges are addressing substance instead of process.

Oliver Wendell Holmes Jr., a realist, worried that the Court was overstepping its boundaries, and the following is from one of his last dissents:

I have not yet adequately expressed the more than anxiety that I feel at the ever increasing scope given to the Fourteenth Amendment in cutting down what I believe to be the constitutional rights of the States. As the decisions now stand, I see hardly any limit but the sky to the invalidating of those rights if they happen to strike a majority of this Court as for any reason undesirable. I cannot believe that the Amendment was intended to give us carte blanche to embody our economic or moral beliefs in its prohibitions. Yet I can think of no narrower reason that seems to me to justify the present and the earlier decisions to which I have referred. Of course the words due process of law, if taken in their literal meaning, have no application to this case; and while it is too late to deny that they have been given a much more extended and artificial signification, still we ought to remember the great caution shown by the Constitution in limiting the power of the States, and should be slow to construe the clause in the Fourteenth Amendment as committing to the Court, with no guide but the Court's own discretion, the validity of whatever laws the States may pass.

Originalists, such as Supreme Court Justice Clarence Thomas, who rejects substantive due process doctrine, and Supreme Court Justice Antonin Scalia, who has also questioned the legitimacy of the doctrine, call a substantive due process a "judicial usurpation" or an "oxymoron". Both Scalia and Thomas have occasionally joined Court opinions that mention the doctrine, and have in their dissents often argued over how substantive due process should be employed based on Court precedent.

Many non-originalists, like Justice Byron White, have also been critical of a substantive due process. As propounded in his dissents in Moore v. East Cleveland and Roe v. Wade, as well as his majority opinion in Bowers v. Hardwick, White argued that the doctrine of a substantive due process gives the judiciary too much power over the governance of the nation and takes away such power from the elected branches of government. He argued that the fact that the Court has created new substantive rights in the past should not lead it to "repeat the process at will". In his book Democracy and Distrust, non-originalist John Hart Ely criticized "substantive due process" as a glaring non-sequitur. Ely argued the phrase was a contradiction-in-terms, like the phrase green pastel redness.

Originalism is usually linked to opposition against substantive due process rights, and the reasons for that can be found in the following explanation that was endorsed unanimously by the Supreme Court in a 1985 case:

[W]e must always bear in mind that the substantive content of the [due process] clause is suggested neither by its language nor by preconstitutional history; that content is nothing more than the accumulated product of judicial interpretation of the Fifth and Fourteenth Amendments.

Originalists do not necessarily oppose protection of the rights heretofore protected using substantive due process; rather, most originalists believe that such rights should be identified and protected through legislation, through passing amendments to the constitution, or via other existing provisions of the Constitution.

The perceived scope of the Due Process Clause has changed over time. For instance, even though many of the Framers of the Bill of Rights believed that slavery violated the fundamental natural rights of African-Americans:

[a] theory that declared slavery to be a violation of the due process clause of the Fifth Amendment ... requires nothing more than a suspension of reason concerning the origin, intent, and past interpretation of the clause.

== Due process clauses in state constitutions ==
No state or federal constitution in the U.S. had ever before utilized any "due process" wording, prior to 1791 when the federal Bill of Rights was ratified.

=== New York ===
In New York, a statutory bill of rights was enacted in 1787, and it contained four different due process clauses. Alexander Hamilton commented on the language of that New York bill of rights: "The words 'due process' have a precise technical import, and are only applicable to the process and proceedings of the courts of justice; they can never be referred to an act of the legislature."

== See also ==
- New York v. O'Neill
