= Noble v. Union River Logging Railroad Co. =

- Supreme Court of the United States

Decided January 9, 1893
- Full case name: Noble v. Union River Logging Railroad Company
- Citations: 147 U.S. 165 (more)

Court membership
- Chief Justice Melville Fuller Associate Justices Stephen J. Field · John M. Harlan; Horace Gray · Samuel Blatchford; Lucius Q. C. Lamar II · David J. Brewer; Henry B. Brown · George Shiras Jr.

Case opinion
- Majority: Brown, joined unanimously

Noble v. Union River Logging Railroad Co., 147 U.S. 165 (1893), was a decision of the United States Supreme Court which held that the Secretary of the Interior violated the Due Process Clause when revoking a railroad corporation's right of way over public lands.

== Background ==
The Union River Logging Railroad Company was a multi-purposed company that focused on building railroads to provide public transportation and logging. In 1882, Union River extended its railroad tracks to reach farther distances in more remote areas. Union River saw the opportunity to do so by taking advantage of an Act of Congress of March 3, 1875, 18 Stat. 482 which allowed "railroads a right of way through the public lands of the United States".

This case considered the rights of the Union River Logging Railroad company under 18 Stat. 482. Broad rights were granted in the past, but as the company continued to grow, the Department of Interior argued that Union River Logging Railroad was using the railroad for private use rather than public. Therefore, "The plaintiff was not engaged in the business of a common carrier of passengers and freight at the time of its application, but in the transportations of logs for the private use and benefit of the several persons composing the said company". After the government attempted to revoke the plaintiff's land, Union River pushed back against these claims arguing that, since they had already been granted this approval it could not be taken away.

== Supreme Court ==
The case was moved to the Supreme Court which ruled that the rights could not be revoked from the Union River company, meaning the use of the land could still be used for transport. The main reason cited was due process. From these results, it was shown that the patent should be granted where the 160 acres of land is public, not connected with the government. A court case used for this process was United States v. Schurz, 102 US 378 (1880), where a patent is granted if all of the right steps have been taken including being signed, countersigned, and duly recorded.
