= Withrow v. Williams =

- Supreme Court of the United States

Argued November 3, 1992 Decided April 21, 1993
- Full case name: Pamela Withrow, Petitioner v. Robert Allen Williams, Jr.
- Citations: 507 U.S. 680 (more) 113 S. Ct. 1745; 123 L. Ed. 2d 407; 1993 U.S. LEXIS 2980; 61 U.S.L.W. 4352; 93 Cal. Daily Op. Service 2893; 93 Daily Journal DAR 4974; 7 Fla. L. Weekly Fed. S 191

Court membership
- Chief Justice William Rehnquist Associate Justices Byron White · Harry Blackmun; John P. Stevens · Sandra Day O'Connor; Antonin Scalia · Anthony Kennedy; David Souter · Clarence Thomas

Case opinions
- Majority: Souter, joined by unanimous (part III); White, Blackmun, Stevens, Kennedy (parts I, II, IV)
- Concur/dissent: O'Connor, joined by Rehnquist
- Concur/dissent: Scalia, joined by Thomas

Withrow v. Williams, 507 U.S. 680 (1993), was a United States Supreme Court case in which the Court held that Fifth Amendment Miranda v. Arizona arguments can be raised again in federal habeas corpus proceedings, even if a criminal defendant had a fair chance to argue those claims in state court. The Court rejected the state's argument that Stone v. Powell, a case holding the opposite in the context of Fourth Amendment claims on habeas review, applied in Williams' case.

== See also ==
- List of United States Supreme Court cases
- Lists of United States Supreme Court cases by volume
- List of United States Supreme Court cases by the Rehnquist Court
