= City of Cincinnati v. Discovery Network, Inc. =

Cincinnati v. Discovery Network, Inc.
- Supreme Court of the United States

Argued November 9, 1992 Decided March 24, 1993
- Full case name: City of Cincinnati v. Discovery Network
- Citations: 507 U.S. 410 (more) 113 S. Ct. 1505; 123 L. Ed. 2d 99; 1993 U.S. LEXIS 2401
- Argument: Oral argument
- Opinion announcement: Opinion announcement

Holding
- A ban by the city of Cincinnati on the distribution of commercial material via news racks violated the First Amendment.

Court membership
- Chief Justice William Rehnquist Associate Justices Byron White · Harry Blackmun; John P. Stevens · Sandra Day O'Connor; Antonin Scalia · Anthony Kennedy; David Souter · Clarence Thomas

Case opinions
- Majority: Stevens, joined by Blackmun, O'Connor, Scalia, Kennedy, Souter
- Concurrence: Blackmun
- Dissent: Rehnquist, joined by White, Thomas

Laws applied
- U.S. Const. amend. I

Cincinnati v. Discovery Network, Inc., 507 U.S. 410 (1993), was a case in which the Supreme Court of the United States held that a ban by the city of Cincinnati, on the distribution of commercial material via news racks, violated the First Amendment.

== See also ==
- List of United States Supreme Court cases, volume 507
- Coates v. Cincinnati
