= Coates v. City of Cincinnati =

Coates v. Cincinnati
- Supreme Court of the United States

Argued January 11, 1971 Decided June 1, 1971
- Full case name: Coates, et al. v. City of Cincinnati
- Citations: 402 U.S. 611 (more) 91 S. Ct. 1686; 29 L. Ed. 2d 214; 1971 U.S. LEXIS 38; 58 Ohio Op. 2d 481

Case history
- Prior: City of Cincinnati v. Coates, 21 Ohio St.2d 66, 255 N.E.2d 247 (Ohio 1970); probable jurisdiction noted, 398 U.S. 902 (1970).

Holding
- A Cincinnati ordinance which made it a criminal offense for three or more persons to assemble on a sidewalk and annoy passersby violated the rights of free assembly and association. Additionally, the vagueness of the law violated due process.

Court membership
- Chief Justice Warren E. Burger Associate Justices Hugo Black · William O. Douglas; John M. Harlan II · William J. Brennan Jr. Potter Stewart · Byron White; Thurgood Marshall · Harry Blackmun

Case opinions
- Majority: Stewart, joined by Douglas, Harlan, Brennan, Marshall
- Concur/dissent: Black
- Dissent: White, joined by Burger, Blackmun

Laws applied
- U.S. Const. amends. I; Section 901-L6, Code of Ordinances of the City of Cincinnati

Coates v. City of Cincinnati, 402 U.S. 611 (1971), is a United States Supreme Court case in which the Court held that a local city ordinance that made it a criminal offense for three or more persons to assemble on a sidewalk and "annoy" any passersby was unconstitutionally vague and overbroad.

== Background ==
In 1956 Cincinnati, Ohio passed an ordinance which provided that:

It shall be unlawful for three or more persons to assemble, except at a public meeting of citizens, on any of the sidewalks, street corners, vacant lots or mouths of alleys, and there conduct themselves in a manner annoying to persons passing by, or occupants of adjacent buildings. Whoever violates any of the provisions of this section shall be fined not exceeding fifty dollars ($50.00), or be imprisoned not less than one (1) nor more than thirty (30) days or both.

Dennis Coates participated in a protest along with four other unnamed students, all of whom were convicted of violating the city ordinance by conducting themselves in an 'annoying manner.' Coates appealed to the Ohio Supreme Court, alleging that the ordinance and his conviction violated the First and Fourteenth Amendments of the United States Constitution.

Relying on Cameron v. Johnson, a Mississippi anti-picketing case, the Ohio Supreme court found that "annoying" was not unconstitutionally vague and affirmed Coates' conviction. However, this decision was overturned in the divided United States Supreme Court decision. The Court found that the ordinance was unconstitutionally vague and violated the First Amendment freedom of assembly.

== Opinion of the U.S. Supreme Court ==
By a 5–4 vote, the United States Supreme Court struck down the Cincinnati ordinance, finding that it "is unconstitutionally vague because it subjects the exercise of the right of assembly to an unascertainable standard, and unconstitutionally broad because it authorizes the punishment of constitutionally protected conduct." Justice Stewart delivered the opinion of the court, explaining that as the ordinance specified no standard of conduct at all (annoying conduct being based mainly on personal opinion), "men of common intelligence must necessarily guess at its meaning." Given its breadth, the ordinance would give the city the power to punish conduct which would otherwise be constitutionally protected. Additionally, the ordinance violated the constitutionally protected right of free assembly, a core guarantee which could not be abridged merely because someone might be "annoyed." Additionally, such an ordinance would give the state an unlawful power to punish virtually any act.

=== Black's opinion ===
Justice Black wrote a separate opinion, neither concurring nor dissenting with the court's opinion. While he agreed with the majority that the court had jurisdiction to hear the case and that a vague law could constitute a due process violation, Black did not find that the ordinance was facially unconstitutional:

[L]aws which broadly forbid conduct or activities which are protected by the Federal Constitution, such as, for instance, the discussion of political matters, are void on their face. On the other hand, laws which plainly forbid conduct which is constitutionally within the power of the State to forbid but also restrict constitutionally protected conduct may be void either on their face or merely as applied in certain instances.

Black argued that this ordinance could have both constitutional and unconstitutional applications, and that the factual record from the trial was insufficient to determine which had occurred. Therefore, he argued that the case ought to be sent back to the Ohio Supreme Court to elucidate exactly how the state considered Coates's actions 'annoying'.

Laws creating circumstances where individuals are left unclear about whether their actions are permitted are ultimately too vague to be constitutional. Black backed this claim with relation to a previous case, Lanzetta v. New Jersey, where the state attempted to label unlawful occupation by repeated lawbreakers as a "gangster". This was declared as unconstitutionally vague as a statement under the Supreme Court.

Black wrote that he would have vacated and remanded the case.

=== Dissent ===
Justice White, along with Justices Burger and Blackmun, dissented, agreeing with Black that the ordinance was not facially unconstitutional. White noted that "as a general rule, when a criminal charge is based on conduct constitutionally subject to proscription and clearly forbidden by a statute, it is no defense that the law would be unconstitutionally vague if applied to other behavior. Such a statute is not vague on its face. It may be vague as applied in some circumstances, but ruling on such a challenge obviously requires knowledge of the conduct with which a defendant is charged" To White, it was not clear what conduct Coates had engaged in, and it might have been conduct within the power of the city to punish. In other words, he believed the ordinance held up under law, but ought to be reviewed on a case-by-case basis.

== Similar cases ==
In Cleveland v. Anderson, a 2013 Ohio Court of Appeals case, the Cuyahoga County Court of Appeals ruled that "As it is written, the disorderly assembly ordinance could be used to incriminate nearly any group or individual. With little effort, one can imagine many . . . assemblages which, at various times, might annoy some persons in the city of Cleveland... Neither the police nor a citizen can hope to conduct himself in a lawful manner if an ordinance which is designed to regulate conduct does not lay down ascertainable rules and guidelines to govern its enforcement. This ordinance represents an unconstitutional exercise of the police power of the city of Cleveland, and is therefore void." The Court of Appeals questioned the constitutionality of the law because they believed that it enabled any act to be prosecuted on the streets.

== See also ==
- Cincinnati v. Discovery Network, Inc.
- Cleveland v. Anderson
