= Houston v. Lacks =

- Supreme Court of the United States

Decided June 24, 1988
- Full case name: Houston v. Lacks
- Citations: 487 U.S. 266 (more)

Holding
- A letter addressed to a court is considered "filed" for the court's purposes when the incarcerated person gives the letter to the mail department.

Court membership
- Chief Justice William Rehnquist Associate Justices William J. Brennan Jr. · Byron White; Thurgood Marshall · Harry Blackmun; John P. Stevens · Sandra Day O'Connor; Antonin Scalia · Anthony Kennedy

Case opinions
- Majority: Brennan
- Dissent: Scalia, joined by Rehnquist, O'Connor, Kennedy

Houston v. Lacks, 487 U.S. 266 (1988), was a United States Supreme Court case in which the court held that a letter addressed to a court is considered "filed" for the court's purposes when the incarcerated person gives the letter to the mail department.

== Background ==
Incarcerated people do not have the ability to send their own mail to courts, and their lawyers are not allowed to file on their behalf either. Their ability to make filings is entirely dependent upon their prison's mail department, which is not under any obligation to send mail immediately. Over the years, this has created various mailbox rule issues where courts must decide if the message is considered received by the courts when the incarcerated person gives the letter to the mail department or when the letter arrives at its destination.

While incarcerated in a Tennessee prison, Houston drafted a pro se notice of appeal from the federal District Court's judgment dismissing his pro se habeas corpus petition, and, 27 days after the judgment, deposited the notice with the prison authorities for mailing to the District Court. The date of deposit was recorded in the prison's outgoing mail log. Because Houston lacked the necessary funds, prison authorities refused his requests to certify the notice for proof that it had been deposited for mailing on the day in question and to send the notice air mail. Although the record contained no evidence of when the prison authorities actually mailed the notice or when the District Court actually received it, the court stamped the notice "filed" 31 days after the habeas judgment—that is, one day after the expiration of the 30-day filing period for taking an appeal under Federal Rule of Appellate Procedure 4(a)(1). For this reason, the Sixth Circuit Court of Appeals dismissed the appeal as jurisdictionally out of time.

== Opinion of the court ==
The Supreme Court issued an opinion on June 24, 1988. Scalia dissented.

== Later developments ==
The Supreme Court addressed a similar issue in Fex v. Michigan, in which an incarcerated person sent a notice letter to a prosecutor in a different state to notify them that that person had pending charges in their state. There is a 180-day statute of limitations for bringing a case after that sort of notice. The Supreme Court, with Scalia now writing the majority, held that the time limit began running when the prosecutor received the letter, not when the incarcerated person deposited it with the prison.
