= Broadrick v. Oklahoma =

- Supreme Court of the United States

Argued March 26, 1973 Decided June 25, 1973
- Full case name: Broadrick v. Oklahoma
- Citations: 413 U.S. 601 (more) 93 S. Ct. 2908; 37 L. Ed. 2d 830

Case history
- Prior: 338 F. Supp. 711 (W.D. Okla. 1972)

Holding
- The Oklahoma statute is not overly broad; the State of Oklahoma has the power to regulate partisan political activities

Court membership
- Chief Justice Warren E. Burger Associate Justices William O. Douglas · William J. Brennan Jr. Potter Stewart · Byron White; Thurgood Marshall · Harry Blackmun; Lewis F. Powell Jr. · William Rehnquist

Case opinions
- Majority: White, joined by Burger, Blackmun, Powell, Rehnquist
- Dissent: Brennan, joined by Stewart, Marshall
- Dissent: Douglas

Laws applied
- First Amendment to the United States Constitution

Broadrick v. Oklahoma, 413 U.S. 601 (1973), is a United States Supreme Court decision upholding an Oklahoma statute which prohibited state employees from engaging in partisan political activities. Broadrick is often cited to enunciate the test for a facial overbreadth challenge that "the overbreadth of a statute must not only be real, but substantial as well, judged in relation to the statute's plainly legitimate sweep."
