= Vagueness doctrine =

Concept in American constitutional law

In American constitutional law, a statute may be void for vagueness and unenforceable if it is too vague for the average citizen to understand what acts or duties are required or restricted. This is because constitutionally permissible activity may not be chilled because of a statute's vagueness (either because the statute is a penal statute with criminal or quasi-criminal civil penalties, or because the interest invaded by the vague law is sufficiently fundamental to subject the statute to strict scrutiny by a court determining its constitutionality). There are several reasons a statute may be considered vague; in general, a statute might be void for vagueness when an average citizen cannot generally determine what persons are regulated, what conduct is prohibited, or what punishment may be imposed. For example, criminal laws which do not state explicitly and definitely what conduct is punishable are void for vagueness. A statute is also void for vagueness if a legislature's delegation of authority to judges or administrators is so extensive that it could lead to arbitrary prosecutions. A law can also be "void for vagueness" if it imposes on First Amendment freedom of speech, assembly, or religion.

The "void for vagueness" legal doctrine does not apply to private law (that is, laws that govern rights and obligations as between private parties), only to laws that govern rights and obligations vis-a-vis the government. The doctrine also requires that to qualify as constitutional, a law must:

- State explicitly what it mandates, and what is enforceable.
- Define potentially vague terms.

== Roots and purpose ==
The void for vagueness doctrine derives from the Due Process Clauses of the Fifth and Fourteenth Amendments to the United States Constitution. That is, vague laws unconstitutionally deprive people of their rights without due process.

The following pronouncement of the void for vagueness doctrine was made by Justice Sutherland in Connally v. General Construction Co., 269 U.S. 385, 391 (1926):

[T]he terms of a penal statute [...] must be sufficiently explicit to inform those who are subject to it what conduct on their part will render them liable to its penalties… and a statute which either forbids or requires the doing of an act in terms so vague that men of common intelligence must necessarily guess at its meaning and differ as to its application violates the first essential of due process of law.

The void for vagueness doctrine requires that laws are so written that they explicitly and definitely state what conduct is punishable. The doctrine thus serves two purposes. First, all persons receive a fair notice of what is punishable and what is not. Second, it helps prevent arbitrary enforcement of the laws and arbitrary prosecutions. The void for vagueness doctrine developed because, "When Congress does not set minimum guidelines to govern law enforcement, there is no limit to the conduct that can be criminalized."

Grayned v. City of Rockford, 408 U.S. 104, 391 (1972):

Vague laws offend several important values. First, because we assume that man is free to steer between lawful and unlawful conduct, we insist that laws give the person of ordinary intelligence a reasonable opportunity to know what is prohibited, so that he may act accordingly. Vague laws may trap the innocent by not providing fair warning. Second, if arbitrary and discriminatory enforcement is to be prevented, laws must provide explicit standards for those who apply them. A vague law impermissibly delegates basic policy matters to policemen, judges, and juries for resolution on an ad hoc and subjective basis, with the attendant dangers of arbitrary and discriminatory application. Third, but related, where a vague statute ‘abut(s) upon sensitive areas of basic First Amendment freedoms,’ it ‘operates to inhibit the exercise of (those) freedoms.’ Uncertain meanings inevitably lead citizens to “steer far wider of the unlawful zone' . . . than if the boundaries of the forbidden areas were clearly marked.'

== Specific application ==
There are at least two ways a law might be attacked for being unconstitutionally vague:

- When a law does not specifically enumerate the practices that are either required or prohibited. In this case, the ordinary citizen does not know what the law requires. See also Coates v. City of Cincinnati (1971) and FCC v. Fox Television Stations, Inc (2012).
- When a law does not specifically detail the procedure followed by officers or judges of the law. As a guard, a law must particularly detail what officers are to do, providing both for what they must do and what they must not do. Under the doctrine, judges must have a clear understanding of how they are to approach and handle a case. See also Kolender v. Lawson (1983).

Both scienter and objective criteria that specify the harm to be protected against are necessary to limit vagueness in criminal statutes (Compare page 9 of). To satisfy the Due Process Clause of the Fifth Amendment, individuals are entitled to understand the scope and nature of statutes which might subject them to criminal penalties. Thus, in Skilling v. United States (2010), it was held that a "penal statute must define the criminal offense (1) with sufficient definiteness that ordinary people can understand what conduct is prohibited and (2) in a manner that does not encourage arbitrary and discriminatory enforcement."

== Unconstitutional vagueness ==
Unconstitutional vagueness is a concept that is used to strike down certain laws and judicial actions in United States federal courts. It is derived from the due process doctrine found in the Fifth and Fourteenth Amendments to the United States Constitution. The doctrine prohibits criminal prosecution for laws where it is impossible to reasonably understand what conduct is prohibited.

=== Examples of unconstitutional vagueness ===
- The Florida Supreme Court, in Franklin v. State (Fla. 1971), ruled that the state's felony ban on sodomy was unconstitutionally vague because an "average person of common intelligence" could not reasonably know, without speculating, whether "abominable and detestable crime against nature" included oral sex or only anal sex.
- Papachristou v. Jacksonville (1972) and Kolender v. Lawson (1983) were two U.S. Supreme Court cases where the court struck down laws against vagrancy for unconstitutional vagueness; in restricting activities like "loafing", "strolling", or "wandering around from place to place", the law gave arbitrary power to the police and, since people could not reasonably know what sort of conduct is forbidden under the law, could potentially criminalize innocuous everyday activities.
- In Hoffman Estates v. The Flipside, Hoffman Estates, Inc. (1982), the Supreme Court considered a pre-enforcement challenge to a municipal ordinance imposing licensing requirements and other restrictions on stores that sold drug paraphernalia. The Court sided with the village, holding that in such a lawsuit the plaintiff must demonstrate that the law would be "impermissibly vague in all its applications".
- The U.S. Supreme Court, in City of Akron v. Akron Center for Reproductive Health (1983), struck down a provision of Akron's abortion law which required that physicians dispose of fetal remains in a "humane and sanitary manner". "Humane" was judged to be unconstitutionally vague as a "definition of conduct subject to criminal prosecution"; the physician could not be certain whether or not his conduct was legal.
- The United States Court of Appeals for the Third Circuit ruled that a supervised release condition prohibiting a defendant from possessing "all forms of pornography, including legal adult pornography" was unconstitutionally vague because it posed a real danger that the prohibition on pornography might ultimately translate to a prohibition on whatever the officer personally found titillating.
- In FCC v. Fox Television Stations, Inc (2012), the Supreme Court ruled that since the words "obscene", "vulgar", "profane", and "indecent", were not accurately defined by the FCC, it was unconstitutionally vague to enforce the restrictions against "obscene", "vulgar", "profane", or "indecent" acts since any person may see different things as obscene, vulgar, profane, or indecent. This was also compounded by the fact that the FCC allowed some words such as "shit" and "fuck" permissible to utter or state in some, but unclear, circumstances; but this was only seen as an accessory to the aforementioned reason.
- In Johnson v. United States (2015), the Supreme Court ruled that the residual clause in the Armed Career Criminal Act was unconstitutionally vague and a violation of due process. The residual clause provided for an enhanced prison sentence for people who had previously been convicted of 3 or more violent felonies, which was defined as "use of physical force against the person of another", "burglary, arson, or extortion", "involves use of explosives", or "otherwise involves conduct that presents a serious potential risk of physical injury to another". The last part is known as the residual clause. The court determined that the residual clause was unconstitutionally vague because of the combination of two factors: (1) it focused on the ordinary case of a felony, rather than statutory elements or the nature of the convicted's actions, leaving significant uncertainty about how to assess the risk posed by a crime; and (2) the clause does not give an indication of how much risk is necessary to qualify as a violent felony. Johnson's case—the fifth U.S. Supreme Court case about the meaning of the residual clause—involved whether possession of a short-barrelled shotgun was a violent felony.
- In Sessions v. Dimaya (2018), the Supreme Court ruled that a statute defining certain "aggravated felonies" for immigration purposes, is unconstitutionally vague. Justice Neil Gorsuch, in a concurring opinion, stressed the dangers of vague laws.

An example of law that has been criticized in the USA for vagueness is the Federal Analogue Act, which establishes criminal liability for making/selling chemicals that are "analogous" to known prohibited drugs, but fails to be sufficiently specific for the accused to know whether an "analogous drug" is prohibited or not. One analyst has pointed out that, according to this law, phenethylamine - a natural component of chocolate — can be considered an "analog" of amphetamine, and that therefore possession of chocolate could (in principle) result in criminal liability.

== See also ==
- Indeterminacy debate in legal theory
- Legal certainty
- Overbreadth doctrine
- Plain Language Movement
- Rule according to higher law
