= Papachristou v. City of Jacksonville =

- Supreme Court of the United States

Argued December 8, 1971 Decided February 24, 1972
- Full case name: Margaret Papachristou et al. v. City of Jacksonville
- Docket no.: 70-5030
- Citations: 405 U.S. 156 (more) 92 S. Ct. 839; 31 L. Ed. 2d 110; 1972 U.S. LEXIS 84

Case history
- Prior: Brown v. City of Jacksonville, 236 So. 2d 141 (Fla. Dist. Ct. App. 1970); cert. granted, 403 U.S. 917 (1971).

Holding
- The court held that a Jacksonville vagrancy ordinance was unconstitutionally vague because it did not provide fair notice of forbidden behavior and it encouraged arbitrary arrests and convictions.

Court membership
- Chief Justice Warren E. Burger Associate Justices William O. Douglas · William J. Brennan Jr. Potter Stewart · Byron White; Thurgood Marshall · Harry Blackmun; Lewis F. Powell Jr. · William Rehnquist

Case opinion
- Majority: Douglas, joined by Burger, Brennan, Stewart, White, Marshall, Blackmun
- Powell and Rehnquist took no part in the consideration or decision of the case.

Papachristou v. Jacksonville, 405 U.S. 156 (1972), was a United States Supreme Court case resulting in a Jacksonville vagrancy ordinance being declared unconstitutionally vague. The case was argued on December 8, 1971, and decided on February 24, 1972. The respondent was the city of Jacksonville, Florida.

== Facts ==
Eight defendants were involved in this case. Each had been convicted of violating a Jacksonville, Florida, vagrancy ordinance that criminalized vagrancy, loitering, and related activity.

=== Vagrancy ordinance ===
Jacksonville's ordinance at the time of the defendants' arrests and conviction was the following:

Rogues and vagabonds, or dissolute persons who go about begging, common gamblers, persons who use juggling or unlawful games or plays, common drunkards, common night walkers, thieves, pilferers or pickpockets, traders in stolen property, lewd, wanton and lascivious persons, keepers of gambling places, common railers and brawlers, persons wandering or strolling around from place to place without any lawful purpose or object, habitual loafers, disorderly persons, persons neglecting all lawful business and habitually spending their time by frequenting houses of ill fame, gaming houses, or places where alcoholic beverages are sold or served, persons able to work but habitually living upon the earnings of their wives or minor children shall be deemed vagrants and, upon conviction in the Municipal Court shall be punished as provided for Class D offenses.

Class D offenses at the time of these arrests and convictions were punishable by 90 days' imprisonment, a $500 fine, or both.

=== Defendants' conduct ===
Four of the eight defendants—Margaret Papachristou, Betty Calloway, Eugene Eddie Melton, and Leonard Johnson—were charged with "prowling by auto" under the Jacksonville vagrancy ordinance. Papachristou and Calloway were white women. Melton and Johnson were black men. At the time of their early Sunday morning arrest, they were driving in Calloway's car in Jacksonville. The arresting officers denied that the racial makeup of the car's passengers was a factor in the arrest. Rather, the officers claimed that they arrested the defendants because they had stopped near a used-car lot that had been broken into several times. The morning they were arrested, however, there had been no evidence of breaking and entering. Shortly after the defendants' arrest, someone from the police department had called Papachristou's parents and told them she had "been out with a negro."

A fifth defendant, Jimmy Lee Smith, was charged with being a "vagabond" under the vagrancy ordinance. He and a companion had been waiting for a friend to lend them a car when he was arrested. It was before 10 a.m. on a weekday. It was a cold morning, so Smith and his companion had walked into a dry cleaning store to wait. The dry cleaning store owners asked Smith and his companion to leave, and they did. Smith and his companion then walked back and forth a few times over a two-block stretch looking for their friend.

The dry cleaning store owners became suspicious and contacted the police, who searched the two men. The police found no weapon, but proceeded to arrest them. The arresting officers said they arrested Smith and his companion because they didn't have identification and because they didn't believe their story that they were waiting for a friend. Smith was also a "part-time organizer for a Negro political group" at the time he was arrested.

Henry Edward Heath was arrested for being a "common thief" under the ordinance. He had driven up to his girlfriend's home, where police officers were already in the process of arresting another man. When he started to back out of the driveway, the officers told him to stop and get out of his car. He did so, and officers searched him and his car. The officers found nothing but arrested him, charging him with being a "common thief" because that was allegedly his reputation. Heath's co-defendant, who was not one of the eight defendants in the Papachristou case, had been charged with loitering for standing in the driveway; the officers conceded that he was only doing so at their command.

Thomas Owen Campbell was also charged with being a "common thief." He was arrested as he was going home early one morning. Officers claimed to have stopped him because he was driving quickly, but they did not charge him with speeding.

Hugh Brown was charged with "disorderly loitering on street" and "disorderly conduct -- resisting arrest with violence." He was arrested when a police officer saw him leave a hotel. The officer summoned Brown to his police cruiser and began to search him. A police witness later testified he had a reputation for being a "thief, narcotics pusher, and generally opprobrious character." As the officer was searching Brown, he touched a pocket where Brown was storing heroin, and Brown began to resist. Brown was charged under the Jacksonville vagrancy ordinance; he was also charged with a narcotics violation, but that was nolled.

== Procedural history ==
=== Jacksonville Municipal Court convictions ===
Each of the eight defendants in this case was first convicted in the Jacksonville, Florida, Municipal Court for violating Jacksonville's vagrancy ordinance.

=== Circuit Court decisions ===
The municipal court convictions were then affirmed at the state trial court level. A Florida Circuit Court judge held that the convictions were not unconstitutional.

=== Brown v. City of Jacksonville ===
After losing in municipal court and at the trial court, the defendants sought review in one of Florida's intermediate appellate courts, the District Court of Appeal of Florida, First Circuit. The case at this phase was named Brown v. City of Jacksonville after defendant Hugh Brown; it would later be renamed after Margaret Papachristou as lead petitioner.

The three-judge panel unanimously dismissed the defendants' petition for review, on June 9, 1970.

The appellate court held that the trial court had not exceeded its authority or failed to uphold the law when it affirmed the defendants' municipal court convictions. Rather, the court explained that the trial court had properly followed existing Florida state law at that time, given that in a previous case, Johnson v. State, the Florida Supreme Court had upheld the constitutionality of a statute similar to the vagrancy ordinance at issue.

=== Writ of certiorari to U.S. Supreme Court ===
On June 14, 1971, the U.S. Supreme Court granted the petitioners' petition for writ of certiorari.

== Decision ==
Justice Douglas delivered the opinion of the court. It was a 7-0 decision, with Justices Powell and Rehnquist not taking part in deciding the case.

=== Holding ===
The Supreme Court held that Jacksonville's vagrancy ordinance was unconstitutionally vague.

=== Reasoning ===
The vagrancy ordinance was unconstitutionally "void for vagueness" for two reasons. First, it failed to provide fair notice to individuals about what conduct was forbidden by the law. Second, it encouraged arbitrary arrests and convictions.

==== Insufficient notice ====
The Court cited a series of Supreme Court precedent standing for the proposition that a law must give fair notice about what conduct it prohibits, including Lanzetta v. New Jersey, Connally v. General Construction Co., and United States v. L. Cohen Grocery Co.

The Court reasoned that the Jacksonville ordinance did not give sufficient notice about what was forbidden and that, as written, it could in fact criminalize a variety of innocent activities.

For example, the ordinance forbid "habitually living without visible means of support," which the Court noted may be involuntary. Similarly, the ordinance labeled as vagrants men who were "able to work but habitually liv[e] upon the earnings of their wives or minor children." The Court reasoned that this would encompass both men who were unemployed due to a recession or structural employment, as well as men who had married rich women.

The ordinance also prohibited "nightwalking," which the Court observed that many people do simply when they can't sleep, and "wandering or strolling around from place to place without any lawful purpose or object." Far from being criminal, the Court stated, wandering about with no purpose is an activity that is "historically part of the amenities of life as we have known them," and has even been extolled by the likes of Walt Whitman, Vachel Lindsay, and Henry Thoreau. The Court held that such an activity is not only inherently innocent but also constitutionally protected.

==== Arbitrary arrests ====
The Court held that the vagrancy ordinance was also unconstitutionally vague because it gave too much arbitrary power to the police. ("Another aspect of the ordinance's vagueness appears when we focus, not on the lack of notice given a potential offender, but on the effect of the unfettered discretion it places in the hands of the Jacksonville police.")

The Court pointed to the dangers inherent in such a law, which could offer a pretense for a bad-faith arrest and which "permits and encourages an arbitrary and discriminatory enforcement of the law." The Court acknowledged that poor people and minorities would often be the ones implicated by this kind of imprecise law, rendering the equal and even-handed administration of justice impossible.

The Court also rejected the City's argument that the vagrancy ordinance allowed them to "nip crime in the bud" as "too extravagant to deserve extended treatment."

== Impact ==
=== "Loitering-plus" laws ===
Papachristou did not strike down loitering and vagrancy laws altogether. Rather, by declaring Jacksonville's ordinance unconstitutionally vague, the decision imposed clarity requirements on future laws of this type. It also strongly suggested that criminalization of "mere" loitering or vagrancy would be unconstitutional.

Thus, in response to Papachristou, many local governments amended their loitering and vagrancy laws in an attempt to make them constitutional. Cities no longer prohibited simply loitering or wandering around but instead enacted so-called "loitering-plus" laws that imposed additional elements.

For example, some loitering-plus laws require one or more of the following: that the individual lack an apparent or sufficient purpose for loitering, that the individual fails to give a satisfactory explanation for loitering, that the individual fails to obey a police order to disperse, that the individual obstructs others from passing, and/or that the individual constitutes a threat to public safety.

==== Examples of loitering-plus laws ====
Examples of loitering-plus laws that municipalities enacted or kept on the books after the Papachristou decision include:

- a Florida ordinance forbidding loitering or prowling "in a place, at a time or in a manner not usual for law-abiding individuals, under circumstances that warrant a justifiable and reasonable alarm or immediate concern for the safety of persons or property"
- an Iowa ordinance forbidding individuals "to collect, assemble, or group together, and after [doing so] . . . to stand, or loiter . . . to the hindrance or obstruction to free passage of any person or persons"
- an Illinois ordinance forbidding any habitual drunkard, person known to be a drug addict or prostitute, or person previously convicted of a felony to congregate in public with other people of these classes

=== City of Chicago v. Morales ===
The loitering-plus laws were still subject to the same judicial scrutiny as previous ordinances that prohibited mere loitering or vagrancy. In 1999, the ACLU challenged the constitutionality of Chicago's loitering-plus law, in a case called City of Chicago v. Morales. The ACLU brought the case on behalf of 66 defendants who were arrested and prosecuted under the ordinance.

The ordinance at issue in that case, entitled the Gang Congregation Ordinance, forbade "criminal street gang members" from loitering in public places, defined as "remain[ing] in any one place with no apparent purpose." Under the ordinance, a police officer who observed someone whom he or she reasonably believed to be a gang member loitering with one or more other people could order them to disperse. Anyone who did not obey would be considered in violation of the ordinance and subject to arrest.

A plurality of the Supreme Court declared the Chicago ordinance unconstitutionally vague for similar reasons as had doomed the Jacksonville ordinance.

Papachristou has been cited in over 1,500 opinions since 1972.

== See also ==
- List of United States Supreme Court cases, volume 405
- Kolender v. Lawson, 461 U.S. 352 (1983)
- Vagueness doctrine
