= Connally v. General Construction Co. =

- Supreme Court of the United States

Argued November 30 – December 1, 1925 Decided January 4, 1926
- Full case name: Connally, Commissioner, et al. v. General Construction Company
- Citations: 269 U.S. 385 (more) 46 S. Ct. 126; 70 L. Ed. 322

Holding
- The court ruled that the provisions in question were void for unconstitutional vagueness.

Court membership
- Chief Justice William H. Taft Associate Justices Oliver W. Holmes Jr. · Willis Van Devanter; James C. McReynolds · Louis Brandeis; George Sutherland · Pierce Butler; Edward T. Sanford · Harlan F. Stone

Case opinions
- Majority: Sutherland, joined by Taft, Holmes, Stone, Brandeis, Sanford
- Dissent: Van Devanter, McReynolds, Butler

Laws applied
- U.S. Const. amend. XIV

Connally v. General Construction Co., 269 U.S. 385 (1926), was a landmark United States Supreme Court case in which the Court expanded and established key constructs of the Fourteenth Amendment's due process doctrine along with establishing the vagueness doctrine. It defined necessary requirements that are fundamental to any law, which, when lacking, are to be deemed void. The case was a dispute regarding Oklahoma state statutes, which, in essence vaguely required businesses to pay workers not less than the "current rate of per diem wages in the locality where the work is performed". The ruling determined that the standards set in place were unconstitutionally vague.

== Provisions rejected by the Supreme Court ==
The Supreme Court nullified all enforcement of provisions §§ 7255 and 7257, of the Compiled Oklahoma Statutes, 1921. The provisions established basic requirements for workers and the rights they were to be prescribed, while working for the state or a company executing a contract for a state, or a subcontractor thereof.

1. 8-hour day for employees
2. Necessary payments (min. wage)

The statutes together defined each day that the employer violated the provisions, as an additional count of the offense. The offense itself established fines of $50–500, and imprisonment of 3–6 months. This form of cumulative punishment made the crime extremely punitive.

== Opinion of the Court ==
The Supreme Court determined that the sections provided for violation of the 5th amendment rights of the employers, by not specifically defining what was and was not punishable; this ruling is particularly famous for furthering the scope of the vagueness doctrine.
