= Overbreadth doctrine =

U.S. First Amendment jurisprudential doctrine

In American jurisprudence, the overbreadth doctrine is primarily concerned with facial challenges to laws under the First Amendment.

== Definition ==
The overbreadth doctrine is used to find statutes that address a First Amendment freedom unconstitutional when, by its plain language, the statute hinders expression. Overbreadth challenges allow a third party, who was not directly harmed by the broad sweep of the statute, to challenge its constitutionality even when his or her own rights are not violated. Thus, a statute that has regulated an individual's expression as allowed by the constitution's protections (i.e. an individual's unprotected speech is appropriately found to have violated a statute) can nonetheless be challenged by that individual on a claim that it also applies to substantial instances of protected expression. This serves to check statutes that would cause individuals to censor their own expressions for risk of breaking the law and being punished, something the Court refers to as chilling speech.

== Overview ==
When federal or state laws are challenged in the United States court system for their constitutionality, they may be via a facial challenge, arguing the whole of the law or provision and all applications of it violate the constitution, or, an as-applied challenge for a specific case or set of circumstances. American courts have recognized several exceptions of speech not protected by the First Amendment (for example, obscenity, fighting words, and libel or defamation), and states therefore have some latitude to regulate unprotected speech. For laws involving the First Amendment, the Courts will consider a law facially invalid where it has the effect of regulating expression outside the scope of these exceptions, in other words, going beyond unprotected speech to regulate protected speech. A statute regulating expression reaching beyond these unprotected exceptions must substantially affect protected speech to be considered over broad (hence, overbreadth).

== Case law ==
Thornhill v. Alabama, 310 U.S. 88 (1940) is the earliest case to follow the reasoning of the overbreadth doctrine. Here, an Alabama statute made it a misdemeanor to be outside a business with the intention of preventing their business in any way, which allowed the arrest of Thornhill for picketing outside of his factory job. Given that Thornhill did act in violation of the statute, Alabama argued that he could not challenge the statute as a violation of rights of others who had not violated the law. Explaining that the issues Thornhill was acting to bring attention to (i.e. labor union relations) were of public concern, Justice Murphy ultimately found Thornhill was improperly arrested because the statute outlawed peaceful expression including Thornhill's protesting. Here, the petitioner's First Amendment right of free speech was violated, but the statute was still found facially unconstitutional because its plain language included the peaceful expression of dissent.

Gooding v. Wilson, 405 U.S. 518 (1972) reached the Supreme Court challenging a Georgia statute which targeted speech that was so offensive as to breach the peace. As the statute only regulated speech (not conduct), Justice Brennan explained in order for the statute to be found constitutional, Georgia had to prove it was only applicable to unprotected speech. In applying the overbreadth doctrine, Justice Brennan made clear that even where the statute at issue is not vague or overbroad in its application to the person on trial, that person may argue that the statute would be vague or overbroad when applied to the constitutionally protected speech of others. If the Court agrees, the statute cannot be applied to the current defendant either. In other words, even when someone has been properly arrested for expression that is not protected by the constitution (i.e. fighting words), if the statute that they were arrested under can be applied to protected speech as well, the statute is facially unconstitutional and void.

In Broadrick v. Oklahoma, 413 U.S. 601 (1973), the Court explicitly mentioned the Overbreadth Doctrine while refusing to apply its "strong medicine," rejecting Broadrick's challenge to Oklahoma's regulation of the political activities of its state employees. Despite not applying the doctrine, Justice White explained the First Amendment exceptions to standing which allow individuals to argue that a statute poses a risk of being enforced against the constitutional right to expression of others. Justice White illustrated the justification for this exception; the possibility of protected speech being chilled far outweighs the risk of harm in allowing some unprotected speech to remain unregulated. This case narrowed the doctrine to require a finding that a challenged statute is substantially overbroad when compared to its permissible applications.

In Bigelow v. Virginia, 421 U.S. 809 (1975), the Court explained how the overbreadth doctrine, as an assessment of a statute's flaw in overreaching into an individual's constitutional rights, is limited. In cases where the individual has been convicted, then challenged the statute's overbroad reach, then the statute was amended such that it no longer risks chilling future speech, the analysis of the overbreadth doctrine is no longer applicable. Without that branch of analysis, the Court is left only to assess whether the old version of the statute (under which the defendant was actually convicted) was constitutionally applied to them. As such, where the statute has been amended, the third party standing analysis is closed and the challenge is narrowed to as-applied (i.e. no longer a facial challenge).

Ten years later, the Court further limited the strength of overbreadth medicine through Brockett v. Spokane Arcade Inc., 472 U.S. 491 (1985), in which only part of a Washington statute was found to be unconstitutionally overbroad. Aiming to leave deference to the legislative intent of a given statute, the Court made clear that where there is not an unseverable statute, or where removal of the overbroad portion of the statute would render it purposeless, courts should only go as far as necessary in invalidating a statute.

Through the years, several cases have failed to prove statutes as facially overbroad. Grayned v. City of Rockford, 92 S.Ct. 2294 (1972) concerned an ordinance limiting the noise allowed around school property during school hours, and such limitations allowed the Court to say it was narrow enough to survive overbreadth scrutiny. New York v. Ferber, 458 U.S. 747 (1982) demonstrated how a possibly overbroad statute was not substantially so as to outweigh the compelling government interest of policing child pornography. The Court upheld the statute notwithstanding the constitutional expression it could chill because it found such cases would be rare and the government interest in this area was far more important. In determining whether a statute's overbreadth is substantial, the courts consider a statute's application to real-world conduct, not fanciful hypotheticals. Accordingly, the courts have repeatedly emphasized that an overbreadth claimant bears the burden of demonstrating, "from the text of [the law] and from actual fact" that substantial overbreadth exists. Virginia v. Hicks, 539 U.S. 113 (2003). Similarly, "there must be a realistic danger that the statute itself will significantly compromise recognized First Amendment protections of parties not before the Court for it to be facially challenged on overbreadth grounds". Members of City Council of Los Angeles v. Taxpayers for Vincent, 466 U.S. 789, 801 (1984). In Hoffman Estates v. The Flipside, Hoffman Estates, Inc., the Court held that the doctrine does not apply to commercial speech.

== Discussion ==
Lewis Sargentich first analyzed and named the doctrine in 1970, in a famous note published in the Harvard Law Review, The First Amendment Overbreadth Doctrine (83 Harv. L. Rev. 844). Citing Sargentich's note, the U.S. Supreme Court explicitly recognized the doctrine in 1973 in Broadrick v. Oklahoma, where the Court stated "the possible harm to society in permitting some unprotected speech to go unpunished is outweighed by the possibility that protected speech of others may be muted and perceived grievances left to fester because of the possible inhibitory effects of overly broad statutes".

Years later, Richard H. Fallon Jr. evaluated the realistic shortcomings of the doctrine, starting with detailing the criticisms of its foundational reasoning in his article published in the Yale Law Journal, Making Sense of the Overbreadth Doctrine (100 Yale L.J. 853). Fallon outlines the arguments against third party standing as contradictory to federalism and the proper powers of the legislature and state courts to write and interpret its own laws. Illustrating the alternative justifications for the doctrine, Fallon opposes the third party standing as a means to prevent chilling speech. Instead, he suggests the doctrine demonstrates a constitutional right to only be subjected to valid rules of law. As such, a defendant properly convicted in violation of an overbroad law should not have been subjected to the law in the first place regardless of his own appropriately regulated expression because the law reached into constitutional protections. In other words, where Thornhill was convicted for picketing outside his job, the conviction was overturned because that law was unconstitutional and one cannot be punished by an unconstitutional law. There is no need for concern on the possible violation of the rights of others.

Another critique of the doctrine, made more recently, attacks its primary justification to prevent the chilling of protected speech. R. George Wright published his article, "The Problems of Overbreadth and What to Do About Them", in the Houston Law Review, in which he suggests that the to-speak-or-not-to-speak dichotomy the Court suggests exists when an overbroad statute is left intact is not realistic. Wright argues it is more likely a scale of multiple variable that are taken into a speaker's consideration; i.e. what tone, what forum to speak in, what audience to target, etc. and these variables are shifted to adjust, rather than silenced all together. In other words, once a statute that may regulate protected speech is upheld, future speakers would adjust their expression to accommodate, rather than remain silent, in response. Under Wright's prediction, there is no real chilling effect because the speech would still be contributed to the market, and therefore the significant interest allowing the Court to hear third party standing arguments is null.
