= United States embargo against Cuba =

Ongoing restriction on trade with Cuba by the United States

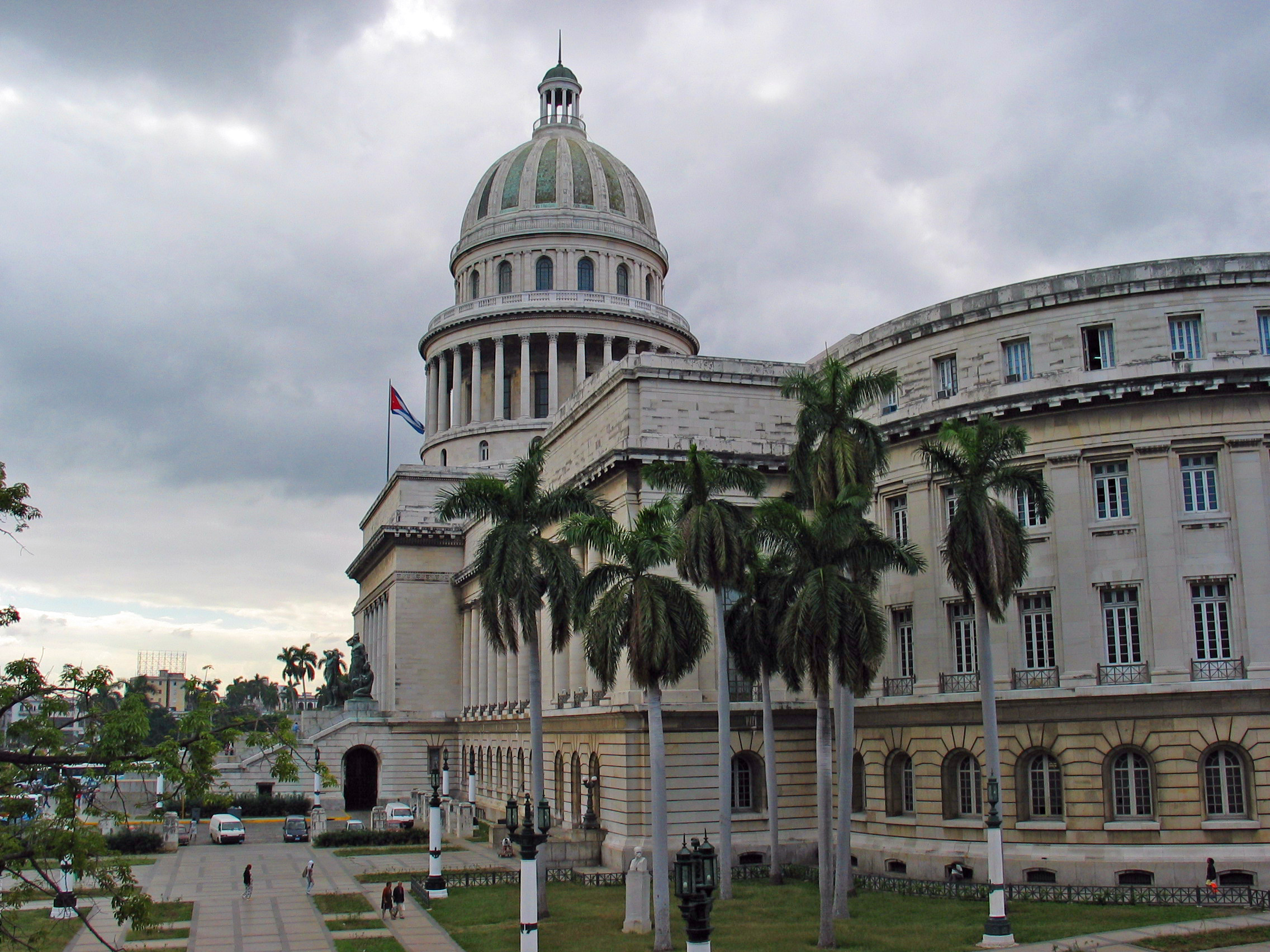
The National Capitol of Cuba in Havana was built in 1929 and is said to be modeled on the United States Capitol in Washington, D.C., 2004

A United States embargo has prevented U.S. businesses and citizens from conducting trade or commerce with Cuban interests since 1960. Modern diplomatic relations are cold, stemming from historic conflict and divergent political ideologies. U.S. economic sanctions against Cuba are comprehensive and impact all sectors of the Cuban economy. It is the most enduring trade embargo in modern history. The U.S. government influences extraterritorial trade with Cuba. The embargo has faced international condemnation for its adverse impact on Cubans, including by the United Nations who have formally condemned it intermittently since 1992.

The U.S. government first launched an arms embargo against Cuba in 1958, with their energy and agricultural sectors targeted in 1960. Following the Cuban Revolution, there were nationalizations and a trade war between the two countries. In October the Cuban government responded with seizure of American economic assets, including oil refineries. The U.S. retaliated with a total embargo on Cuban trade, with exceptions for food and medicine. Cuba held nuclear missiles for the Soviet Union during the 1962 Cuban Missile Crisis, which resulted in the U.S. fully blockading the island. The embargo was loosened during the Cuban thaw from 2015 to 2017, but was tightened sharply again thereafter.

The embargo is enforced mainly through the Trading with the Enemy Act of 1917, the Foreign Assistance Act of 1961, the Cuban Assets Control Regulations of 1963, the Cuban Democracy Act of 1992, the Helms–Burton Act of 1996, and the Trade Sanction Reform and Export Enhancement Act of 2000. Relations remain tense due to stark differences on immigration, counterterrorism, civil and political rights, human rights, electoral interference, disinformation campaigns, humanitarian aid, trade policy, financial claims, U.S. foreign policy, and Cuban foreign policy.

== History ==
=== Eisenhower presidency ===
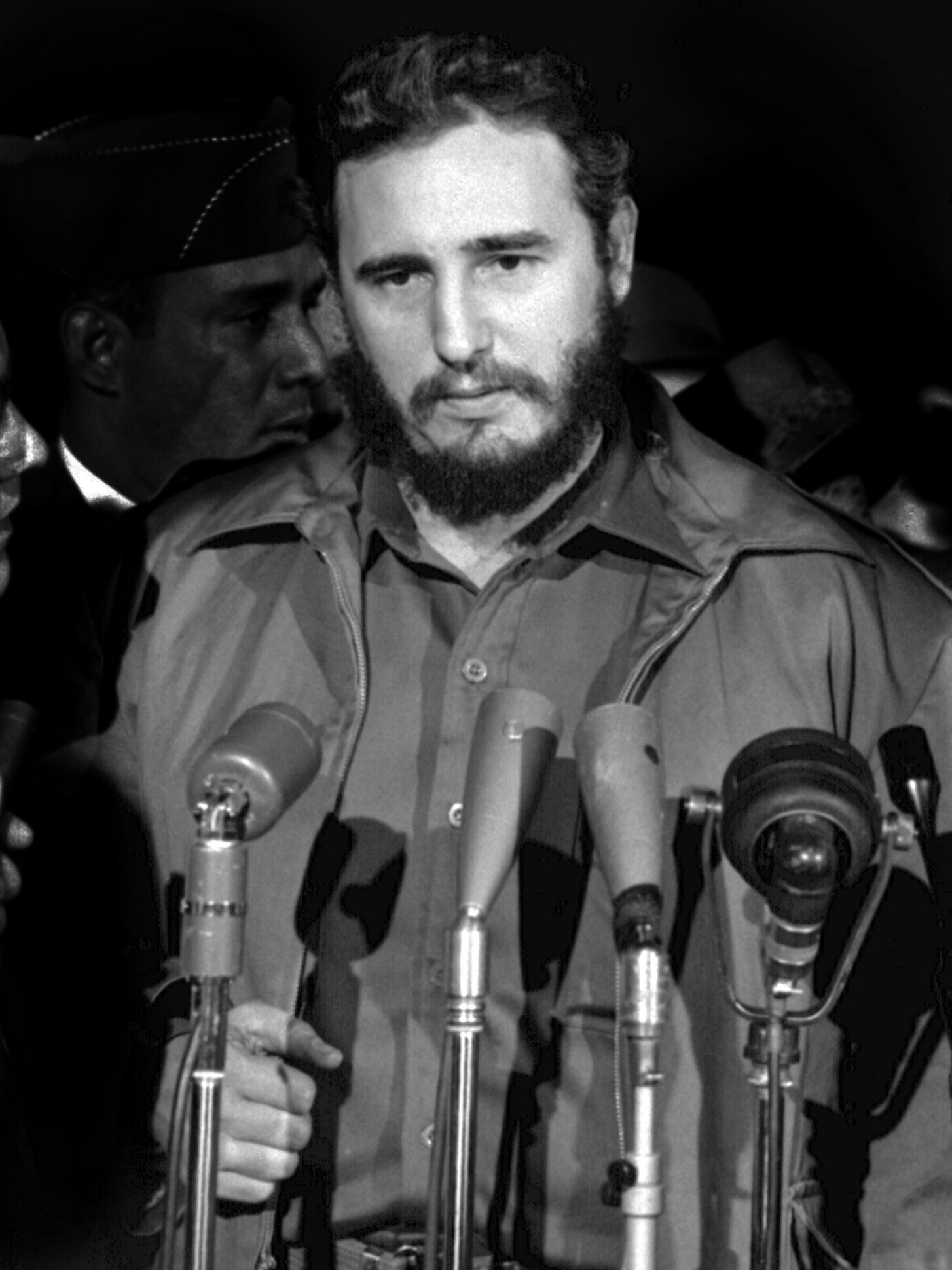
Cuban leader Fidel Castro, Washington, D.C., 1960

The United States imposed an arms embargo on Cuba on March 14, 1958, during the armed conflict of 1953-1959 between rebels led by Fidel Castro and the Fulgencio Batista régime. Arms sales violated U.S. policy which had permitted the sale of weapons to Latin-American countries which had signed the 1947 Inter-American Treaty of Reciprocal Assistance (Rio Treaty) as long as the weapons were not used for hostile purposes. After the Castro socialist government came to power on January 1, 1959, relations were initially friendly between Castro and the Dwight D. Eisenhower administration.

In December 1959, less than twelve months after the Cuban Revolution, the Central Intelligence Agency (CIA) developed a plan for paramilitary action against Cuba. It was approved and implemented in March 1960. The CIA recruited operatives on the island to carry out terrorism and sabotage, kill civilians, and cause economic damage.

In April, the U.S. Department of State issued a memorandum acknowledging majority support within Cuba for the Castro administration, the fast spread of communism within the country, and the lack of an effective political opposition. In May the Cuban government began regularly and openly purchasing armaments from the Soviet Union, citing the U.S. arms embargo. In July 1960 the U.S. reduced the import quota of brown sugar from Cuba to 700,000 tons under the Sugar Act of 1948; the Soviet Union responded by agreeing to purchase the sugar instead.

In June 1960, Eisenhower's government refused to export oil to the island, leaving Cuba reliant on Soviet crude oil. Cuba and the Soviet Union signed a trade agreement according to which the Soviet Union would provide 900,000 tons of oil to Cuba. The U.S. viewed the agreement as a provocation, and successfully urged Esso, Texaco, and Shell to refuse to process Soviet crude in their Havana and Santiago de Cuba refineries. On June 29 and July 1, 1960, Cuba confiscated the refineries. The U.S. responded by canceling its quota of sugar purchases from Cuba.

On July 11, 1960, Eisenhower wrote a personal letter to the UK prime minister Harold Macmillan encouraging joint action in sanctioning Cuba. Eisenhower elaborates in the letter that the reason for the original diplomatic decline with Cuba was:

The story of the cancellation of elections, of the ascendancy of the Communist oriented group and purge of the moderates, of the executions and the hounding of all anti-Communists, of the abortive Cuban-supported efforts to overthrow various Caribbean governments, and of the shrill anti-American diatribes... We were directly affected when Castro, choosing the Agrarian Reform Law version advanced by the extremists, authorized the expropriation of extensive American properties without acceptable provision for compensation.

Eisenhower goes on to mention that despite these issues, he pursued a "policy of restraint" throughout 1959, but that the ultimate factor leading to a proactive approach against the Castro government in 1960 was:

...the degree to which Cuba had been handed over to the Soviet Union as an instrument with which to undermine our position in Latin America and the world.

In response to sanctions, on August 30, 1960, the Cuban government nationalized three American-owned oil refineries as well as Compañía Cubana de Electricidad, the Cuban Telephone Company, and 36 sugar mills. The refineries became part of the state-run company, Unión Cuba-Petróleo. This prompted the Eisenhower administration to launch the first trade embargo—a prohibition against selling all products to Cuba outside of humanitarian aid.

In October 1960, the Cuban administration responded by nationalizing all American businesses and most American privately owned properties on the island. Castro promised to separate Americans in Cuba from all of their possessions "down to the nails in their shoes". Cuba's nationalization laws required the government to compensate the owners of seized property, but compensation was to be made in Cuban bonds, an offer rejected by American authorities. Payments pursuant to the Cuban bonds were to be paid from the sale of Cuban sugar to the U.S., but the Americans had just canceled its purchases of Cuban sugar. No compensation was paid. Other countries which had their assets nationalised, including Switzerland, Canada, Spain, and France, were more agreeable to Castro’s terms, seemingly convinced that they would not be able to get a better deal.

The second wave of nationalizations prompted the Eisenhower administration, in one of its last actions, to sever all diplomatic relations with Cuba in January 1961. The U.S. partial trade embargo with Cuba continued under the Trading with the Enemy Act of 1917. The Cuban government's nationalization of U.S. owned property is the “largest uncompensated taking of American property by a foreign government in history.” Assets seized, included vacation homes and bank accounts of wealthy individuals, but most seized property was owned by large American corporations, including sugar factories, mines and oil refineries.

=== Kennedy presidency ===
Following the Bay of Pigs Invasion of 17 to 20 April 1961, an operation devised under Eisenhower but which President John F. Kennedy had approved preceding his presidency, Castro characterized the Cuban revolution and state as "socialist". It aligned with the Soviet Union. On September 4, 1961, partly in response, Congress passed the Foreign Assistance Act, a Cold War Act that prohibited aid to Cuba and authorized the President to impose a complete trade embargo against Cuba. On January 21, 1962, Cuba was suspended by the Organization of American States (OAS), by a vote of 14 in favor, one (Cuba) against with six abstentions. Mexico and Ecuador, two abstaining members, argued that the OAS Charter did not authorize expulsion. Multilateral sanctions were imposed by OAS, led by the U.S., on July 26, 1964, but were later rescinded on July 29, 1975. Relations between Cuba and the OAS have since warmed and the suspension was lifted on June 3, 2009.

Starting in November, the U.S. engaged in a violent campaign of terrorism and sabotage against civilians and military targets on the island, known as the Cuban Project. As well as the removal of the Castro government, the U.S. sought to force the Cuban government to introduce intrusive civil measures and divert precious resources to protect its citizens from the terror attacks.

Kennedy extended measures by executive order, first widening the scope of the trade restrictions on February 8 and then again on March 23, 1962. These measures expanded the embargo to include all imports of products containing Cuban goods, even if the final products had been made or assembled outside Cuba. On August 3, 1962, the Foreign Assistance Act was amended to prohibit aid to any country that provides assistance to Cuba. On September 7, 1962, Kennedy formally expanded the Cuban embargo to include all Cuban trade, except for the non-subsidized sale of food and medicines. Following the Cuban Missile Crisis of October 1962, Kennedy imposed travel restrictions on February 8, 1963, and the Cuban Assets Control Regulations were issued on July 8, 1963, again under the Trading with the Enemy Act, in response to Cuba hosting Soviet nuclear weapons. These measures froze Cuban assets in the U.S. and consolidated existing restrictions.

=== Rapprochement with Cuba ===
The restrictions on U.S. citizens traveling to Cuba lapsed on March 19, 1977; the regulation was renewable every six months, but President Jimmy Carter did not renew it and the regulation on spending U.S. dollars in Cuba was lifted shortly afterwards. President Ronald Reagan reinstated the trade embargo on April 19, 1982, though it was now only restricted to business and tourist travel and did not apply to travel by U.S. government officials, employees of news or film making organizations, persons engaging in professional research, or persons visiting their close relatives. This was modified 22 years later with the present regulation, effective June 30, 2004, being the Cuban Assets Control Regulations (31 C.F.R. Part 515).

=== Increasing legislation ===
The embargo was reinforced in October 1992 by the Cuban Democracy Act and in 1996 by the Cuban Liberty and Democracy Solidarity Act (known as the Helms–Burton Act) which penalizes foreign companies that do business in Cuba by preventing them from doing business in the U.S. The Helms-Burton Act further restricted U.S. citizens from doing commerce in or with Cuba, and mandated restrictions on giving public or private assistance to any successor government unless and until certain claims against the Cuban government were met. The key sponsor of the Cuban Democracy Act, Democrat Robert Torricelli, stated that the legislation would "wreck[sic] havoc on that island." Justification provided for these restrictions was that these companies were trafficking in stolen U.S. properties, and should thus be excluded from the United States. The European Union criticized the Helms-Burton Act because it felt that the U.S. was dictating how other nations ought to conduct their trade and challenged it on that basis. The E.U. eventually dropped its challenge in favor of negotiating a solution.

After the Cuban military shot down two airplanes operated by Hermanos al Rescate (Brothers to the Rescue) in 1996, killing three Americans and a U.S. resident, a bi-partisan coalition in the U.S. Congress approved the Helms–Burton Act. The Title III of this law also states that any non-U.S. company that "knowingly traffics in property in Cuba confiscated without compensation from a U.S. person" can be subjected to litigation and that company's leadership can be barred from entry into the United States. Sanctions may also be applied to non-U.S. companies trading with Cuba. This restriction also applies to maritime shipping, as ships docking at Cuban ports are not allowed to dock at U.S. ports for six months. This title includes waiver authority, so that the President might suspend its application. The waiver must be renewed every six months and traditionally was until U.S. President Donald Trump in 2019.

In response to pressure from some American farmers and agribusiness, the embargo was relaxed by the Trade Sanctions Reform and Export Enhancement Act, which was passed by Congress in October 2000 and signed by President Bill Clinton. The relaxation allowed the sale of agricultural goods and medicine to Cuba for humanitarian reasons. Although Cuba initially declined to engage in such trade (having even refused U.S. food aid in the past, seeing it as a half-measure serving U.S. interests), the Cuban government began to allow the purchase of food from the U.S. as a result of Hurricane Michelle in November 2001. In some tourist spots across the island, American brands such as Coca-Cola can be purchased. Ford tankers refuel planes in airports and some computers use Microsoft software. The origin of the financing behind such goods is not always clear. The goods often come from third parties based in countries outside the U.S., even if the product being dealt originally has U.S. shareholders or investors.

=== Cuban thaw ===
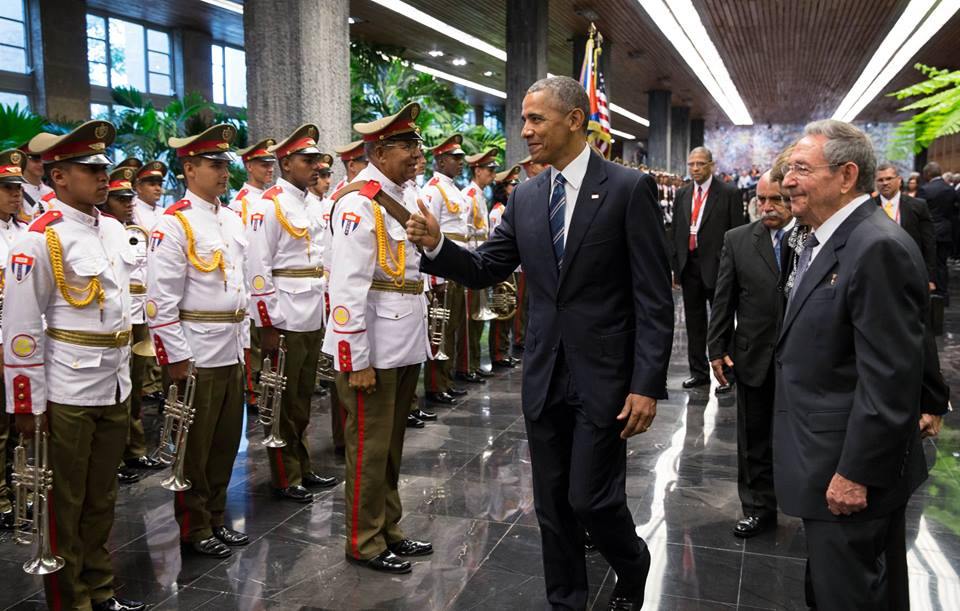
Barack Obama and Raúl Castro at the Palace of the Revolution in Havana, 2016

In April 2009, President Barack Obama first attempted to warm relations by easing the U.S. travel ban, allowing Cuban-Americans to travel freely to Cuba. Ana Cecilia became the first officially approved ship to sail in July 2012 from Miami to Cuba. Two years later, in 2014, the Obama administration announced its intention to formally re-establish relations with Cuba and later completed a prisoner exchange. President Obama and First Secretary of the Communist Party of Cuba Raúl Castro met on April 11, 2015, the first meeting in over 50 years. On May 29, 2015, the U.S. removed Cuba from its designated list of state sponsors of terrorism. It was later re-added under the first Trump administration six years later. American banks then were temporarily allowed to open accredited accounts in Cuban banks.

Relations were officially established on July 20, 2015, with increased travel licenses, amended civil aviation and commercial passenger aircraft regulations, and normalized import-export license requirements announced in September. In February 2016, the U.S. agreed to allow two American men to build a $5–10 million tractor factory in Cuba. The deal was later disallowed by Cuban authorities because one of the investors was a Cuban permanent resident and Cuba does not allow large investments by Cubans who live on the island. In his final eight days in office, Obama formally discontinued the wet feet, dry feet policy, announcing that all illegal immigrants from Cuba would be subject to removal, in an effort to promote legal alternatives.

=== Renewed embargo ===
On November 8, 2017, it was announced that President Trump's administration had enacted new rules which would re-enforce the business and travel restrictions which were loosened by the Obama administration and would go into effect on November 9. In 2019, ExxonMobil, the largest American energy producer, sued the Cuban government for their theft of U.S. oil assets in the 1960s. In September 2019, the U.S. tightened restrictions on Cuba by limiting U.S. remittances to Cuba and further closing the country's access to the U.S. financial system. Immediately following Cuba's re-designation as a state sponsor of terrorism in January 2021, the State Department launched new political sanctions against Cuba's support of Venezuela and their president, Nicolás Maduro. That month the U.S. Treasury additionally sanctioned the Cuban Ministry of Interior for human rights abuses in Cuba.

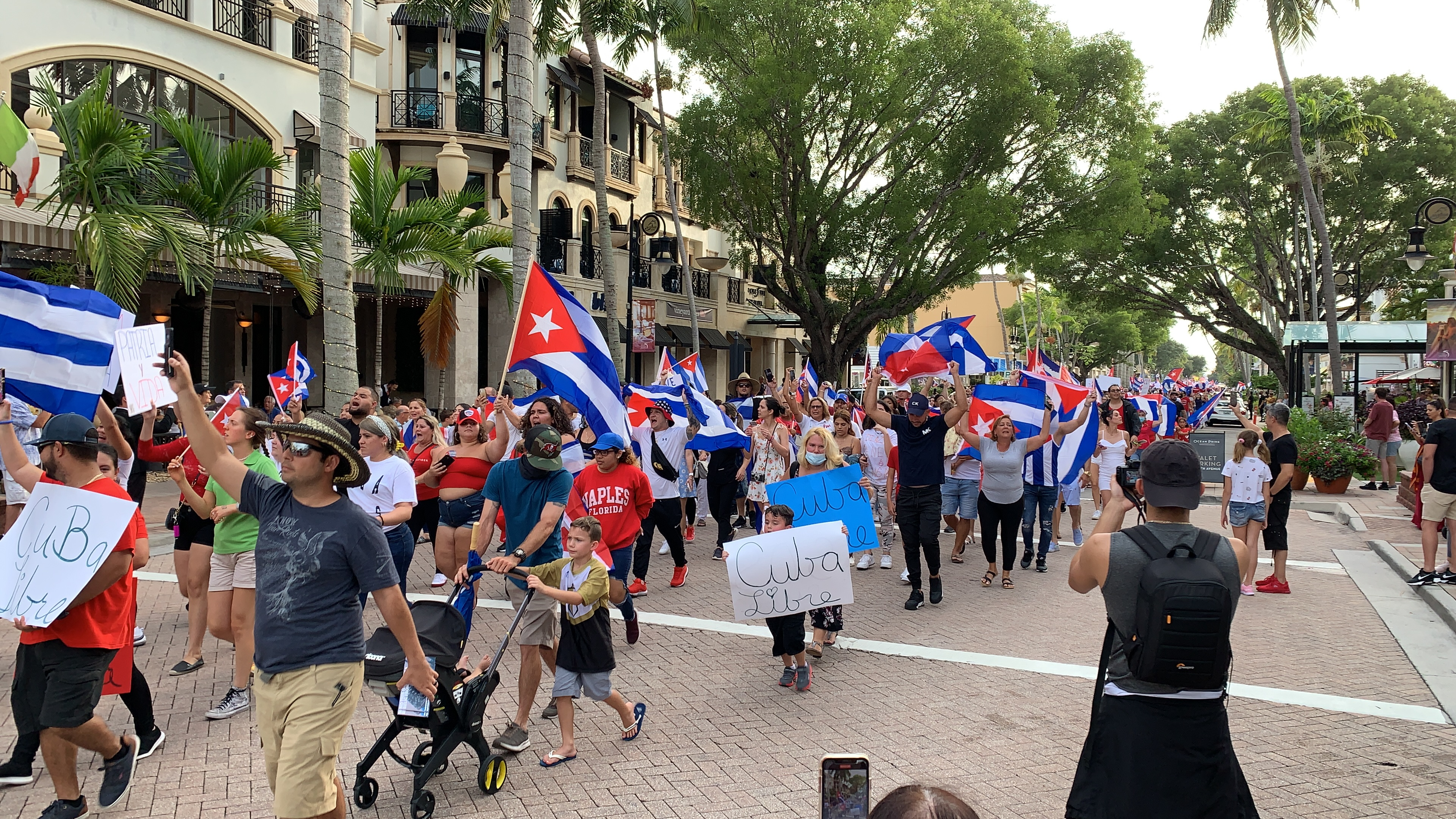
A protest against the Cuban government and in support of the U.S. embargo in Naples, Florida, 2021

In July 2021, under President Joseph Biden, the U.S. imposed sanctions on Cuba's domestic police force and on two of Cuba's leaders in response to political violence related to the 2021 Cuban protests. Cuba attempted to embargo the U.S. by banning U.S. cash deposits at Cuban banks in 2021 but had to reverse the ban due to economic distress in 2023. The U.S. government eased select financial sanctions against companies that serve Cuban interests but have no link to the Cuban government in 2024. President Biden authorized additional sanctions against Cuba during the 2024 Cuban protests which caused further diplomatic strain with First Secretary of the Communist Party of Cuba Miguel Díaz-Canel. First Secretary Díaz-Canel was joined by former First Secretary Raúl Castro in a protest with "tens of thousands of Cubans" against the U.S. embargo in December following the re-election of President Trump.

=== "Total pressure" embargo ===
The U.S. government significantly tightened its economic sanctions against Cuba in January 2025, orienting around a "total pressure" or "maximum pressure" strategy. In addition to re-designating the island as a state sponsor of terrorism for a third time, the State Department announced further sanctions against Cuban military contractors and further restricted Cuba's access to the U.S. dollar. U.S. Homeland Security and Coast Guard soon thereafter restricted immigration of economic refugees from Cuba, along with Haiti, Nicaragua, and Venezuela. The U.S. re-activated Title III of the Helms–Burton Act, an international deterrent against foreign investment in Cuba. The U.S. government halted foreign aid funding, expanded visa restrictions, and formally cautioned against Cuban forced labor in February. President Trump issued a presidential directive in July for greater enforcement of the Cuban travel ban, further isolating the tourism industry of Cuba. The U.S. government banned First Secretary Díaz-Canel along with two ministers from entering the U.S., later restricting access to the Cuban luxury real estate sector.

In January 2026, the U.S. introduced an extraterritorial tariff mechanism aimed at halting the supply of crude oil and refined petroleum products to the island. The UN publicly criticized the American trade policy, calling it a "fuel blockade".

== Impact ==
=== Economic impact ===
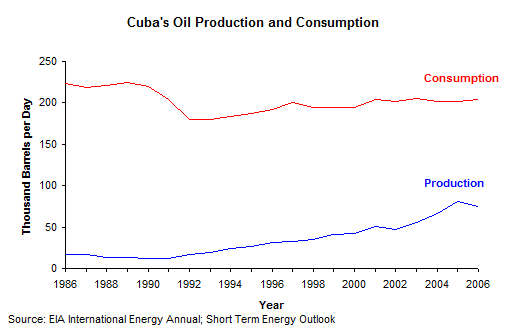
Cuban oil production and consumption remained depressed from 1991 to 2000 during an extended period of economic distress.

The economic impact of the U.S. trade embargo on Cuba is comprehensive and impacts all sectors of the Cuban economy. The United Nations estimated in 2023 the total economic damage to the Cuban economy to be in the "trillions of dollars" since inception. A 2015 report in Al Jazeera estimated that the embargo had cost the Cuban economy $1.1 trillion in the 55 years since its inception, once inflation is taken into account. The Cuban government assessed the cost in 2018 to be around $933 billion since inception. In 2009, the U.S. Chamber of Commerce estimated that the embargo costs the U.S. economy $1.2 billion per year in lost sales and exports, while the Cuban government estimates that the embargo has cost the island itself $753 million annually. In 2001, the U.S. International Trade Commission found that, from 1996 and 1998, without the embargo, Cuban imports to the U.S. would be worth $658 million. In 2002, the U.S.-based, anti-embargo Cuba Policy Foundation estimated that the embargo costs the U.S. economy $3.6 billion per year in economic output. The U.N. assessed the damage to the Cuban economy from 2022 to 2023 to be at $4.87 billion.

The U.S. government has pursued extraterritorial measures to enforce its embargo. Cuban ambassador Ricardo Alarcón cited 27 recent cases of trade contracts interrupted by U.S. pressure to the U.N. in 1991. British Petroleum was seemingly dissuaded by U.S. authorities from investing in offshore oil exploration in Cuba despite initially expressing interest. In 1992, the U.S. State Department discouraged firms like Royal Dutch Shell and Clyde Petroleum from investing in Cuba. In 1998, U.S. officials attributed Cuba's economic penury not as a result of the embargo, but instead its unwillingness to liberalize its own economy and substantial debts owed to its Japanese, European, and Latin American trading partners.

After the formal implementation of the embargo and the passage of Proclamation 3355, there was a 95% decrease in Cuba's sugar quota, which canceled roughly 700,000 tons of the 3,119,655 tons previously allotted to the United States. A year later, Cuba's sugar quota was reduced to zero when President Eisenhower issued Proclamation 3383. This substantially affected Cuba's total exports, as Cuba was one of the world's leading sugar exporters at the time.

In 1989, with the collapse of the Soviet bloc, Cuba witnessed its most devastating economic crises. Cuba's GDP plummeted 34% and trade between the nations apart from the Council of Mutual Economic Assistance (CMEA) declined by 56%. Between 1989 and 1992 (the Special Period), the termination of trade partnerships with the Soviet bloc caused the total value of Cuba's exports to fall by 61% and imports to drop by approximately 72%. International economists believed the Cuban government would fall along with the Soviet Union but Cuba instituted a campaign of macroeconomic adjustment and liberalization instead, which provided significant economic recovery. As of 2024, Cuba was experiencing its worst economic crisis in 30 years due to increased sanctions, the challenges of economic reforms, and the COVID-19 pandemic. In February 2026, Cuba suspended refueling for airliners at its airports, including José Martí International Airport, stating it had exhausted the country's fuel supply due to the U.S. blockade of the island and the end of fuel supplies from Venezuela after U.S. intervention the previous month.

=== Financial impact ===
The U.S. government has implemented significant restrictions on financial activity within Cuba. The U.S. Treasury holds over $6 billion worth of financial claims against the Cuban government according to the U.S. Foreign Claims Settlement Commission. There are over 6,000 financial claims against the Cuban government by American companies valued at around $2 billion. The Cuban government is required to pay cash for all food imports from the U.S., as credit is not allowed. Cuba is heavily dependent on U.S. remittances from family members and access to U.S. dollar deposits influences financial decision-making on the island. Limited access to the U.S. dollar and financial system has exacerbated wealth inequality in Cuba and forced involuntary dollarization on the island. Cuban banks are banned from operating within the United States. U.S. investors are prohibited from owning and trading Cuban sovereign debt.

Cuba conducts international financing with many countries, including many U.S. allies; U.S.-based companies, and companies that do business with the U.S. which trade in Cuba do so at the risk of U.S. sanctions. The U.S. has threatened to stop financial aid to other countries if they trade non-food items with Cuba. The U.S.'s attempts to do so have been vocally condemned by the United Nations General Assembly as an extraterritorial measure that contravenes "the sovereign equality of States, non-intervention in their internal affairs and freedom of trade and navigation as paramount to the conduct of international affairs".

=== Humanitarian impacts ===
The embargo has been criticized for its effects on food, clean water, medicine, and other socioeconomic needs of the Cuban population. Criticism has come from both Fidel Castro and Raúl Castro, citizens and groups from within Cuba, and international organizations and leaders. U.S. diplomat Lester D. Mallory wrote an internal memo on April 6, 1960, arguing in favor of an embargo to "(make) the greatest inroads in denying money and supplies to Cuba, to decrease monetary and real wages, to bring about hunger, desperation and overthrow of government".

The embargo has been linked to shortages of medical supplies and soap which have resulted in a series of medical crises and heightened levels of infectious diseases. Medical scholars have also linked the embargo to epidemics of specific diseases, including neurological disorders and blindness caused by poor nutrition. An article written in 1997 suggests malnutrition and disease resulting from increased food and medicine prices have affected men and the elderly in particular, due to Cuba's rationing system which gives preferential treatment to women and children. In 1997, the American Association for World Health stated that the embargo contributed to malnutrition, poor water access, lack of access to medicine and other medical supplies and concluded that "a humanitarian catastrophe has been averted only because the Cuban government has maintained a high level of budgetary support for a health care system designed to deliver primary and preventative medicine to all its citizens." The AAWH found that travel restrictions embedded in the embargo have limited the amount of medical information that flows into Cuba from the United States. Since 2000, the embargo has explicitly excluded the acquisition of food and medicines.

In 2026, the humanitarian situation in Cuba worsened following the imposition of a fuel embargo by the administration of U.S. President Donald Trump. The resulting fuel shortages have had severe and far‑reaching consequences for the civilian population. Between January and July 2026, the country experienced four total blackouts—two in March and two within a single week in July. The most recent outage, which occurred on July 10, left the island without electricity for the second time in five days. These widespread power failures disrupted public services, including transportation, and increasingly restricted access to housing, livelihoods, and basic necessities.

The health sector has been especially hard hit. In June 2026, UN High Commissioner for Human Rights Volker Turk cited data indicating that infant mortality in Cuba had nearly doubled in recent months. "The fuel restrictions imposed since early 2026 and the recent tightening of extraterritorial sanctions, taken together, are directly harming Cubans, especially the most vulnerable," Turk said in a statement. "Children are dying because doctors lack access to essential medical supplies and medicines. This is unacceptable."

=== Political impact ===
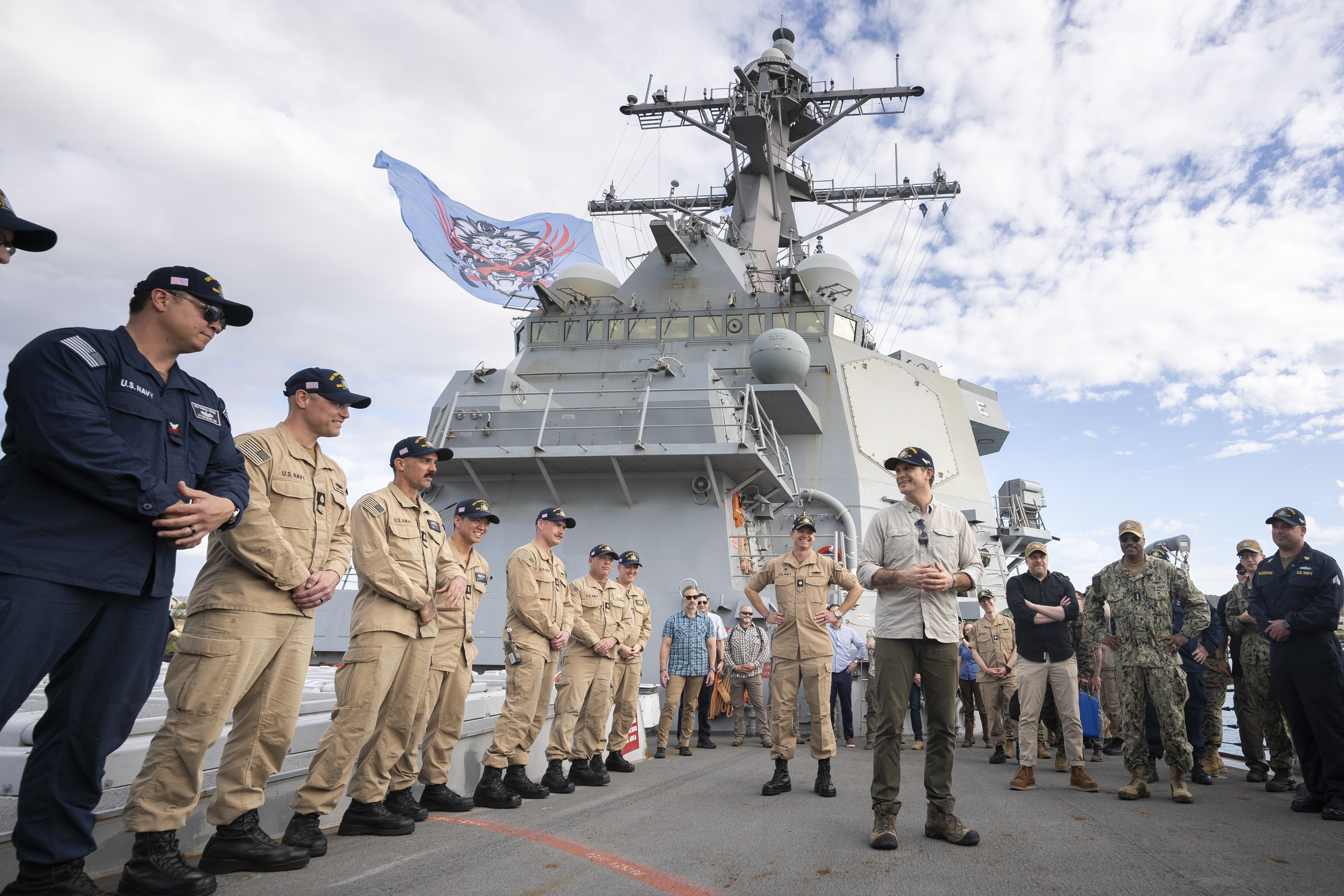
U.S. Defense Secretary Pete Hegseth aboard a ship on Guantanamo Bay Naval Base, 2025

The severe effects of the U.S. embargo on the economic activity and political affairs of Cuba has led political scientists to classify the effort as a full-scale "blockade". They claim that violations of the embargo are too harsh, citing the fact that violations often lead to severe sanctions. Academic Nigel White writes, "While the U.S. measures against Cuba do not amount to a blockade in a technical or formal sense, their cumulative effect is to put an economic stranglehold on the island, which not only prevents the U.S. intercourse but also effectively blocks commerce with other states, their citizens and companies." Political economist Jorge Antonio stated in 2000 that the effects of the embargo on the development of Cuba are likely negligible. His research concluded: "Under the real world of Castroism, however, the answer must be a terse one: none. The embargo has not harmed the Cuban economy. Cooperation between the U.S. and Cuba would have been impossible from the very beginning of the Revolution for legal, political, ideological, strategic, and economic reasons, not to mention others of a philosophical or moral character."

Former Central Bank of Cuba economist Pavel Vidal said "Reforms in Cuba do not depend on the embargo, and the embargo should be eliminated unilaterally, independently from reforms in Cuba. Both cause problems". A 2009 report by Amnesty International found that the "Cuban embargo has had an adverse effect on human rights" and said that "states must take into account the effects that [imposed] sanctions may have on the enjoyment of economic, social and cultural rights in the country affected". In Cuba, the embargo is commonly called el bloqueo (the blockade), especially by the government and its supporters.

=== Food and medicine ===
Since the Trade Sanction Reform and Export Enhancement Act was enacted in 2000, the trade of food and medicine goods is excluded from the embargo. Complex licensing and regulatory requirements severely limit export of medicines, medical equipment and supplies, which contain anything produced or patented by the United States, to Cuba. In 2020, $176.8 million worth of goods were exported to Cuba from the U.S. and $14.9 million imported to the U.S. from Cuba.

=== Travel restrictions ===
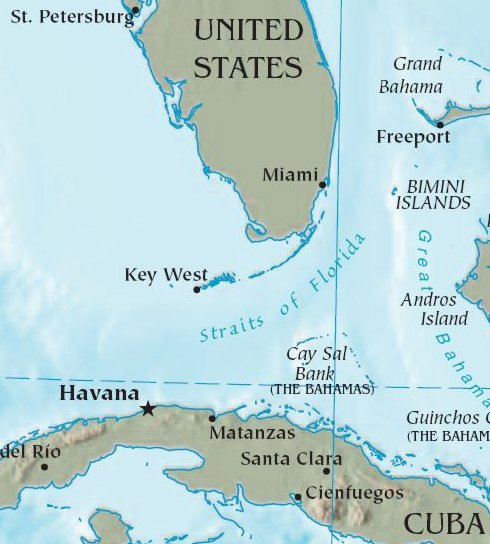
Cuba is 90 miles (145 kilometers) south of Florida, 2006

The U.S. embargo has included travel restrictions for American tourists visiting the island since 1961. The U.S. government maintains a Level II Travel Advisory Alert for the island, cautioning citizens against legally traveling through Cuba due to crime. Federal law requires persons subject to U.S. jurisdiction to obtain a license to engage in any travel-related transactions pursuant to travel to, from, and within Cuba. Transactions related solely to tourist travel are not licensable. The U.S. Treasury Department's Office of Foreign Assets Control (OFAC) considers any visit of more than one day to be prima facie proof of violation. OFAC also holds that U.S. citizens may not receive goods or services for free from any Cuban national, eliminating any attempts to circumvent the regulation based on that premise.

The current regulation does not prohibit travel by U.S. citizens to Cuba per se, but it makes it illegal for U.S. citizens to have transactions (spend money or receive gifts) in Cuba under most circumstances without an OFAC issued license. Since even paying unavoidable airfare ticket taxes into a Cuban airport would violate this transaction law, it is effectively impossible for ordinary tourists to visit Cuba without breaking the monetary transaction rule.

Spurred by a burgeoning interest in the assumed untapped product demand in Cuba, a growing number of free-marketers in Congress, backed by Western and Great Plains lawmakers who represent agribusiness, have tried each year since 2000 to water down or lift regulations preventing Americans from traveling to Cuba. President George W. Bush threatened to veto such efforts which stalled the legislation during the 2000s.

==== Violations ====
U.S. nationals have circumvented the ban by traveling to Cuba from a different country, such as Mexico, the Bahamas, Canada, or Costa Rica. The practice opens U.S. citizens to a risk of prosecution and fines by the U.S. government if discovered. In 2006, the U.S. announced the creation of a task force that will more aggressively pursue violations of the U.S. trade embargo against Cuba, with severe penalties. Criminal penalties for violating the embargo range up to ten years in prison, $1 million in corporate fines, and $250,000 in individual fines; civil penalties up to $55,000 per violation.

== Criticism ==
=== International ===
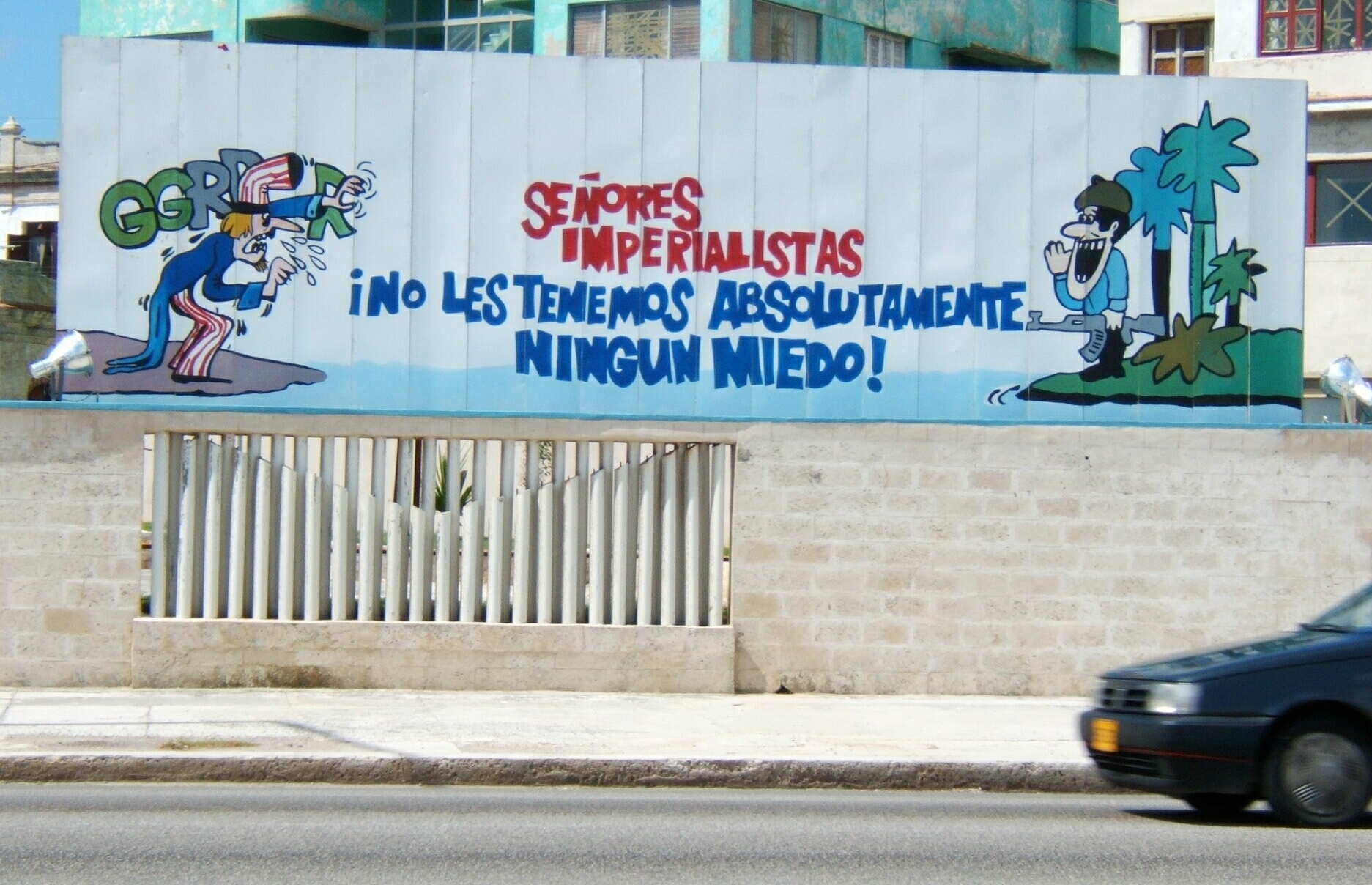
A poster in Havana, depicting a Cuban soldier defying Uncle Sam, with the inscription, "Mister Imperialists, we are not afraid of you at all!", 2005

The embargo is formally opposed by multiple international organizations including: Amnesty International, Human Rights Watch, and the Inter-American Commission on Human Rights, among others around the world.

The Helms-Burton Act has been the target of criticism from Canadian and European governments in particular, who object to what they say is the extraterritorial pretensions of a piece of legislation aimed at punishing non-U.S. corporations and non-U.S. investors who have economic interests in Cuba. The European Council has criticized the embargo as being extraterritorial and indirectly impacting the economic growth of European countries that have ties to Cuba, recommending WTO dispute settlement.

=== Domestic ===
The embargo has also faced criticism from a select faction of international trade advocates and business leaders. Cato Institute's Daniel Griswold called the embargo a failure, saying the economic sanctions have impoverished Cubans and "deprived Americans of their freedom to travel and has cost US farmers and other producers billions of dollars of potential exports." Business leaders who have opposed the embargo include: James E. Perrella, Dwayne O. Andreas, and Peter Blyth, according to Foreign Affairs.

It has faced criticism from a variety of U.S. political figures since inception. President Jimmy Carter called for an end to the embargo in 2002 saying the U.S. and Cuba were "trapped in a destructive state of belligerence." George Shultz, who served as Secretary of State under Reagan, called the embargo "insane" in 2005. Venezuelan President Hugo Chávez criticized the embargo in 2009 calling it a "great farce" later stating that the "U.S. empire [is] alive and well, threatening us." During this time U.S. President Barack Obama discussed easing the embargo during his 2008 campaign for president, though he promised to maintain it. Secretary of State Hillary Clinton publicly shared the view that the embargo helps the Castros stay in power by enabling an anti-American narrative. The Latin America Working Group argues that pro-embargo Cuban-American exiles, whose votes are crucial in the U.S. state of Florida, have swayed many politicians to adopt views similar to their own. In June 2011, George McGovern, the Democratic nominee for president in 1972, blamed "embittered Cuban exiles in Miami" for keeping the embargo alive. Political scientist William LeoGrande opined in 2015 that the embargo "has never been effective at achieving its principal purpose: forcing Cuba's revolutionary regime out of power or bending it to Washington's will.'

Humanitarian opposition of the embargo has persisted since the 1970s due to the strict restrictions the embargo imposes on Cubans. Pope John Paul II criticized the embargo during his 1979 pastoral visit to Mexico. Patriarch Bartholomew I called the embargo a "historic mistake" while visiting the island in 2004. Reverends Jesse Jackson and Al Sharpton as well as minister Louis Farrakhan have also publicly opposed the embargo. The U.S. bishops called for an end to the embargo on Cuba, after Pope Benedict XVI's 2012 visit to the island.

Film director Michael Moore challenged the embargo by bringing 9/11 rescue workers in need of healthcare to Cuba to obtain subsidized health care.

=== United Nations ===
Every year since 1992, except for 2020 due to the COVID-19 pandemic, the U.N. General Assembly has passed a non-binding resolution that condemns the ongoing impact of the embargo and declares it in violation of the Charter of the United Nations and of international law. Israel is the only country that routinely joins the U.S. in voting against the resolution. Other countries that voted against the resolution in the past include Romania in 1992, Albania and Paraguay in 1993, Uzbekistan from 1995 to 1997, Marshall Islands from 2000 to 2007, Palau from 2004 to 2009 then once in 2012, and Brazil in 2019. 187 countries voted in favor of the resolution in 2024, with only the United States and Israel voting against it and Moldova abstaining.

In 2025, five countries joined the United States and Israel in voting against the resolution: Argentina, Paraguay, Hungary, North Macedonia, and Ukraine. Additionally, twelve countries abstained from the vote: Albania, Bosnia and Herzegovina, Costa Rica, the Czech Republic, Ecuador, Estonia, Latvia, Lithuania, Morocco, Poland, Moldova, and Romania. This was reportedly a result of intense lobbying by the Trump administration, as well as a protest against the alleged participation of Cuban nationals as foreign volunteers during the ongoing Russian invasion of Ukraine. In February 2026, UN experts condemned the executive order issued by the Trump administration which imposed a fuel blockade on Cuba.

In October 2026, the General Assembly again adopted the resolution, for the 34th time, by a vote of 130 in favor, 17 against, and 25 abstentions. This was a sharp drop from the 165 votes in favor, 7 against, and 12 abstentions in 2025, and the lowest level of support for the resolution in at least 20 years. Besides the United States and Israel, the countries voting against included Argentina, Colombia, Costa Rica, Ecuador, and Paraguay, while Chile, the Dominican Republic, Germany, Greece, Honduras, Italy, and Peru were among those abstaining. Venezuela did not take part in the vote, as its voting rights in the Assembly were suspended over unpaid dues under Article 19 of the UN Charter. The vote followed a year of heightened tension between Washington and Havana, including U.S. sanctions on sellers of oil to Cuba, and came amid an energy crisis on the island. In the debate, U.S. representative Mike Waltz denied that a blockade exists, pointing to U.S. exports to Cuba, and blamed Cuba's crisis on its government, while Cuban foreign minister Bruno Rodríguez Parrilla blamed the embargo for shortages in the country's health system.

U.N. Resolutions against the U.S. embargo on Cuba
year	date	resolution number	link	for	against	abstention	voting against
1992	November 24	47/19	https://undocs.org/A/RES/47/19	59	3	71	U.S., Israel, Romania
1993	November 3	48/16	https://undocs.org/A/RES/48/16	88	4	57	U.S., Israel, Albania, Paraguay
1994	October 26	49/9	https://undocs.org/A/RES/49/9	101	2	48	U.S., Israel
1995	November 2	50/10	https://undocs.org/A/RES/50/10	117	3	38	U.S., Israel, Uzbekistan
1996	November 12	51/17	https://undocs.org/A/RES/51/17	138	3	25	U.S., Israel, Uzbekistan
1997	November 5	52/10	https://undocs.org/A/RES/52/10	143	3	17	U.S., Israel, Uzbekistan
1998	October 14	53/4	https://undocs.org/A/RES/53/4	157	2	12	U.S., Israel
1999	November 9	54/21	https://undocs.org/A/RES/54/21	155	2	8	U.S., Israel
2000	November 9	55/20	https://undocs.org/A/RES/55/20	167	3	4	U.S., Israel, Marshall Islands
2001	November 27	56/9	https://undocs.org/A/RES/56/9	167	3	3	U.S., Israel, Marshall Islands
2002	November 12	57/11	https://undocs.org/A/RES/57/11	173	3	4	U.S., Israel, Marshall Islands
2003	November 4	58/7	https://undocs.org/A/RES/58/7	179	3	2	U.S., Israel, Marshall Islands
2004	October 28	59/11	https://undocs.org/A/RES/59/11	179	4	1	U.S., Israel, Marshall Islands, Palau
2005	November 8	60/12	https://undocs.org/A/RES/60/12	182	4	1	U.S., Israel, Marshall Islands, Palau
2006	November 8	61/11	https://undocs.org/A/RES/61/11	183	4	1	U.S., Israel, Marshall Islands, Palau
2007	October 30	62/3	https://undocs.org/A/RES/62/3	184	4	1	U.S., Israel, Marshall Islands, Palau
2008	October 29	63/7	https://undocs.org/A/RES/63/7	185	3	2	U.S., Israel, Palau
2009	October 28	64/6	https://undocs.org/A/RES/64/6	187	3	2	U.S., Israel, Palau
2010	October 26	65/6	https://undocs.org/A/RES/65/6	187	2	3	U.S., Israel
2011	October 25	66/6	https://undocs.org/A/RES/66/6	186	2	3	U.S., Israel
2012	November 13	67/4	https://undocs.org/A/RES/67/4	188	3	2	U.S., Israel, Palau
2013	October 29	68/8	https://undocs.org/A/Res/68/8	188	2	3	U.S., Israel
2014	October 28	69/5	https://undocs.org/A/Res/69/5	188	2	3	U.S., Israel
2015	October 27	70/5	https://undocs.org/A/Res/70/5	191	2	0	U.S., Israel
2016	October 26	71/5	https://undocs.org/A/Res/71/5	191	0	2	
2017	November 1	72/4	https://undocs.org/A/Res/72/4	191	2	0	U.S., Israel
2018	November 1	73/8	https://undocs.org/A/Res/73/8	189	2	0	U.S., Israel
2019	November 7	74/7	https://undocs.org/A/Res/74/7	187	3	2	U.S., Israel, Brazil
2021	June 23	75/289	https://undocs.org/A/Res/75/289	184	2	3	U.S., Israel
2022	November 3	77/7	https://undocs.org/A/Res/77/7	185	2	2	U.S., Israel
2023	November 2	78/38	https://undocs.org/en/A/78/L.5	187	2	1	U.S., Israel
2024	October 30	79/38	https://undocs.org/en/A/79/L.6	187	2	1	U.S., Israel
2025	October 29	80/4	https://digitallibrary.un.org/record/4091600?ln=en	165	7	12	U.S., Argentina, Hungary, Israel, North Macedonia, Paraguay, Ukraine
2026	October 28	81/7	https://digitallibrary.un.org/record/4131295?ln=en	130	17	25	U.S., Argentina, Bosnia and Herzegovina, Colombia, Costa Rica, Czechia, Ecuador, Hungary, Israel, Lithuania, Morocco, North Macedonia, Paraguay, Slovenia, Trinidad and Tobago, Ukraine, United Arab Emirates

== Public opinion in the U.S. ==
Cuba continues to play a destabilizing role in the Western Hemisphere, providing a communist foothold in the region and propping up U.S. adversaries in places like Venezuela and Nicaragua by fomenting instability, undermining the rule of law, and suppressing democratic processes. The U.S. government has made a strategic decision to reverse the loosening of sanctions and other restrictions on the Cuban regime. These actions will help to keep U.S. dollars out of the hands of Cuban military, intelligence, and security services.

— United States Department of the Treasury, on U.S. embargo implementation, June 2019

A 2008 USA Today/Gallup Poll indicated that Americans believed that diplomatic relations should be re-established with Cuba, with 61% in favor and 31% opposed. In January 2012, an Angus Reid Public Opinion poll showed that 57% of Americans called for ending the U.S. travel ban with Cuba, with 27% disagreeing and 16% not sure.

The Cuban Research Institute at Florida International University has conducted thirteen polls (from 1991 to 2020) of Cuban Americans in Dade County, Florida. In 1991, support for the embargo was 67.9% (5.5% don't know) shortly after the end of the Cold War, bottoming out at 31.6% (9.4% don't know) in 2016 during the Cuban thaw, and back up to 54% (8% don't know) in 2020 after relations with Cuba deteriorated. In 2024, the Cuban Research Institute found high levels of support for the embargo among Cuban-American voters in southern Florida, reporting that 55% of Cuban-American voters were in favor of the embargo's continuation with 43% preferring a more humanitarian sanctions program.

== See also ==
- Sanctions against North Korea
- Sanctions against Iran
- Sanctions against Syria
- Sanctions against Russia
- United States oil blockade during Operation Southern Spear
