= Battle of Ideas =

2002–2006 mass political campaign in Cuba

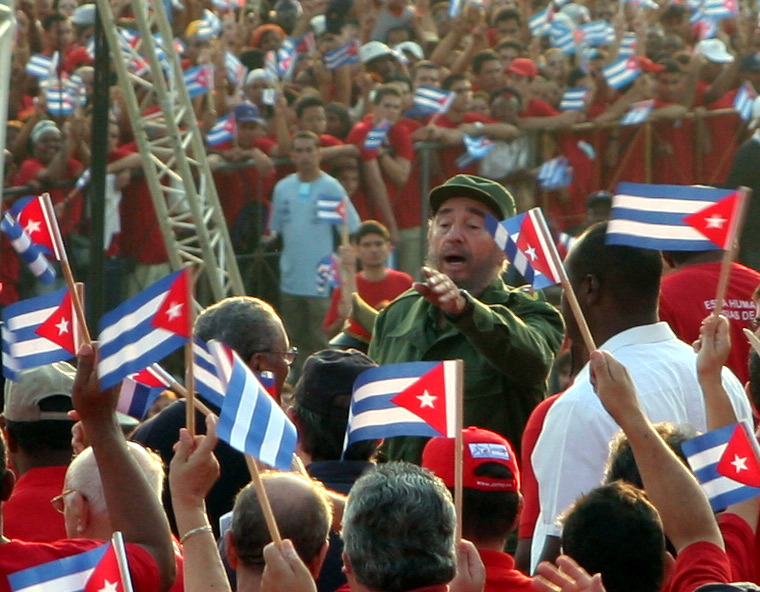
- Fidel Castro at a May Day rally during the Battle of Ideas
- Native name: Batalla de ideas
- Date: 2000–2006
- Location: Cuba
- Cause: Special Period; Dollarization of Cuba; Elián González affair
- Motive: Revitalize public morale
- Target: Youth
- Organised by: "Group of the Battle of Ideas"
- Outcome: Increase in medical aid to foreign countries; Increased educational infrastructure; Energy Revolution

The Battle of Ideas was a mass political campaign in Cuba that began after the return of Elián González to Cuba in 2000. The Battle of Ideas was preceded by popular disillusionment in the economy after the crisis of the Special Period, and a growing embrace of capitalism via dollarization. The Cuban government intended to revitalize the population's enthusiasm for socialism. The effort for ideological revitalization began after Elián González's return, because it was seen as a breakthrough diplomatic success, after years of crisis and internal decline. The Battle of Ideas attempted to emphasize human development, deemphasize economic growth, and return to the ideological spirit of the 1960s. This meant a focus on education, healthcare, centralized economic planning, and the mass mobilization of the population. Cuba also began forging closer diplomatic ties with Pink tide governments, often providing medical services.

The Battle of Ideas came to an end in 2006 with the retirement of Fidel Castro. Soon after, Raul Castro took over his brother's presidential duties.

== Background ==
=== Ideological trends ===
Cuba had long since been involved in contradicting economic reforms. Certain periods embraced a Guevarist model of economic planning, which emphasized voluntarism, and revolutionary consciousness, as the movers of economic development. While other periods embraced a more liberalizing model that focused on profit-making and certain capitalist measures.

=== Special Period and Dollarization ===
In 1991, the Soviet Union collapsed, resulting in a large-scale economic collapse throughout the newly independent states which once comprised it. During its existence, the Soviet Union provided Cuba with large amounts of oil, food, and machinery. In the years following the Soviet Union's collapse, Cuba's gross domestic product shrank 35%, imports and exports both fell over 80%, and many domestic industries shrank considerably. Food and weapon imports stopped or severely slowed.

To encourage economic recovery, in 1993 the Cuban government legalized the possession and circulation of foreign exchange. In July 1993, it was announced that it was now legal to possess American dollars, through Decree Law № 140, which was instated on 13 August 1993. The law aimed at stimulating external remittances from Cubans living in the United States transfer dollars during a time when there was a shortage of dollars in Cuba. This law made it possible for Cubans to sell goods and services to foreigners who were visiting the island and resulted in an increase in capital.

=== Elián González affair ===
On 21 November 1999, Elián González, his mother Elizabeth Brotons Rodríguez, and twelve others left Cuba on a small aluminum boat with a faulty engine; González's mother and ten others died in the crossing, and their bodies were never recovered. González floated at sea on an inner tube until he was rescued by two fishermen, who handed him over to the United States Coast Guard.

On 22 April, agents of the United States Border Patrol captured Elián González. Approximately 100 people protested against the raid as it took place, with some calling the INS agents "assassins". Four hours after he was taken from the house in Miami, González and his father were reunited at Andrews Air Force Base.

== History ==
=== Origins ===
In December 1999, during a Federation of University Students meeting, a student announced a spontaneous march to the Office of American Interests in Havana to demand the return of Elián González. A few days after the march the "Group of the Battle of Ideas" was formed by the Young Communist League and the Federation of University Students. The group began organizing demonstrations across Cuba for the return of Elián González. After González's return, the group began regularly meeting with Fidel Castro to oversee various construction projects and government meetings in Cuba. Fidel Castro ensured that the group had special authorities, and could bypass the approval of various ministries.

=== Service programs ===
The Battle of Ideas focused on bolstering public education. Greater funding was placed on education, teacher training increased, university lectures were broadcast on TV, and enrollment in university reached 100% by 2007, compared to 22% in 2000. Havana's International Book Fair became an annual event, and busing was provided by the government to transport young people to the book fair. Smaller book fairs were also organized across Cuba.

Cuba also began various programs to provide medical aid to various developing countries. Cuba became the primary source of all healthcare capital in Venezuela by 2005. Starting in 2004, Cuba engaged in various deals to both provide doctors to East Timor, and also train East Timoran doctors.

=== Economics ===
In 2005, the financial autonomy of Cuban enterprises was removed, and the Central Bank became responsible for all monetary transactions. These economic reforms were conducted by invoking the legacy of Che Guevara, and his dedication to voluntarism.

In 2005, youth brigades were organized to police the gasoline black market, and in 2006, youth brigades were also mobilized to help build Cuba's crumbling energy infrastructure. This initiative was referred to as the "Energy Revolution".
