= Cuban Assets Control Regulations =

Regulations of the United States Department of the Treasury

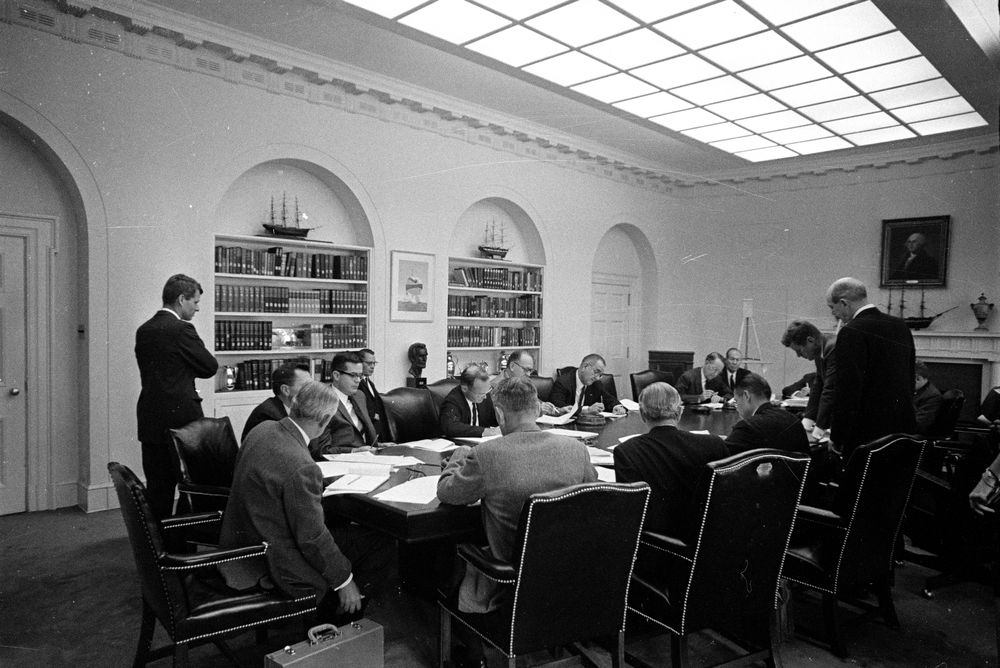
The U.S. government, namely the National Security Council, meeting in 1962 to discuss regulations to contain the Cuban Missile Crisis.

The Cuban Assets Control Regulations (CACR), 31 CFR 515, are a set of federal regulations that serve as the primary enforcement mechanism of the United States embargo against Cuba. They impose restrictions on economic activity between the United States and Cuba, deriving legislative authority from the Trading with the Enemy Act of 1917. The regulations were enacted by U.S. President John F. Kennedy on July 8, 1963, following the prior year's Cuban Missile Crisis. The U.S. government has expanded these regulations in the 21st century due to evolving geopolitical issues between the two nations. Within the Treasury Department, the Office of Foreign Assets Control (OFAC) administers and enforces these economic sanctions. The OFAC has the authority to regulate and amend the CACR to be consistent with the policies and goals of the executive administration.

Broadly, the regulations prohibit any person subject to U.S. jurisdiction from dealing in any property in which Cuba or a Cuban national has an interest. All property of Cuba and Cuban nationals in the possession or control of persons subject to U.S. jurisdiction is "blocked." Payments, transfers, withdrawals, or other dealings are prohibited. The CACR prohibits all transactions dealing with property in which Cuba has any interest in whatsoever, direct or indirect. OFAC has broad authority to interpret these "trade" regulations to cover not just standard trade, but also to extend to travel-related expenditures that effectively make it illegal for an individual to travel to Cuba. The President has broad discretion to establish such categories and limitations on travel to Cuba. Through this codification only Congress retains the power to fully remove the embargo. The U.S. government passed the Helms–Burton Act in 1996, formally codifying the regulations such that only the United States Congress can fully lift the embargo.

== History ==
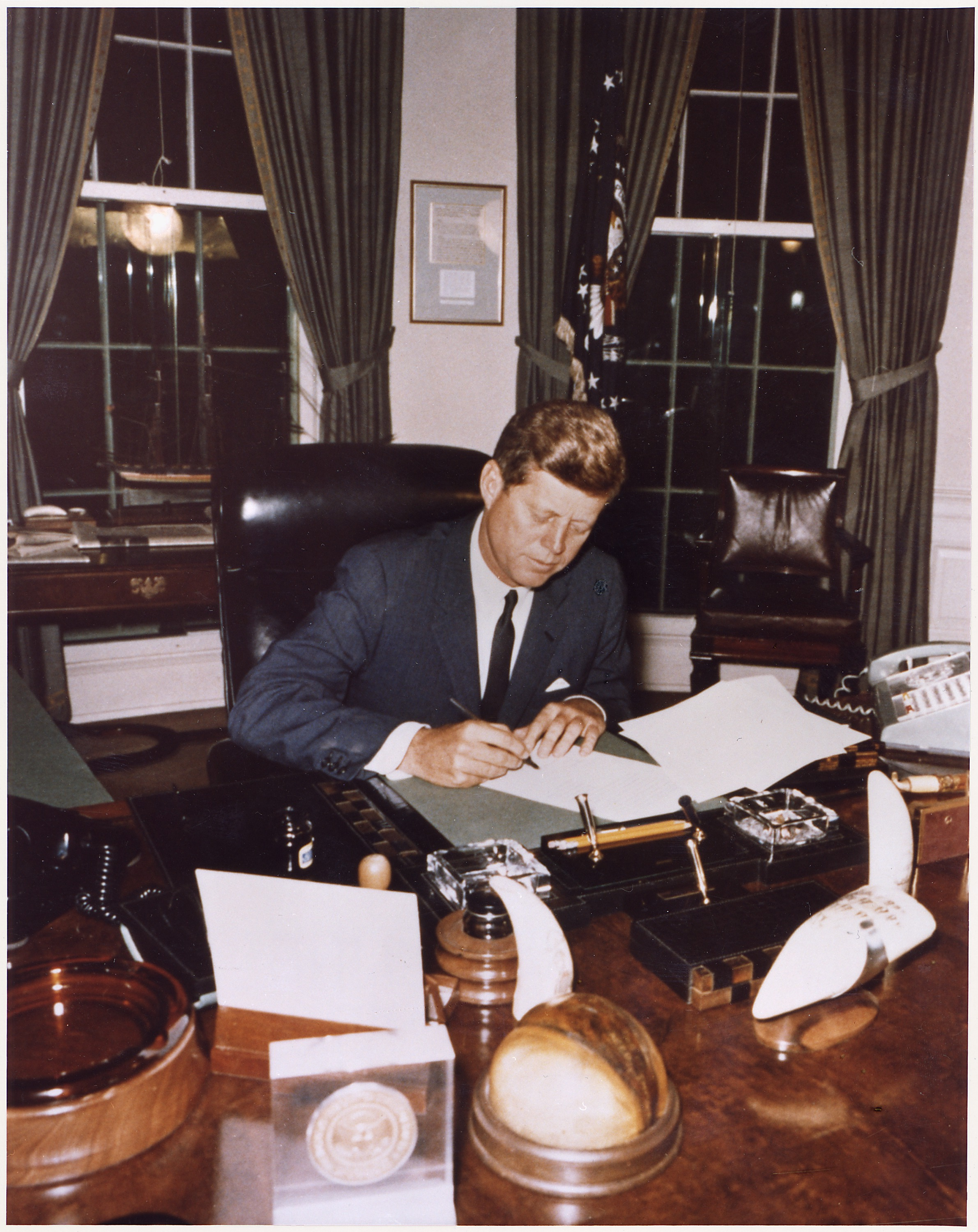
U.S. President John F. Kennedy, 1962

Prior to the Cuban Revolution of 1959, the U.S. had a long history of seeking relations with Cuba for its own economic gain. By 1952, U.S. companies were the largest foreign investors in Cuba, owning much of the land and resources. The United States interest in Cuban land and resources continued to increase under Fulgencio Batista's rule, as 59% of exports went to, and 76% of the imports came from, the United States before 1959. After the Revolution, Fidel Castro consolidated power and declared Cuba a communist country. President Dwight D. Eisenhower formally recognized the new Cuban government led by Castro shortly after his coming to power. However, relations between the U.S and Cuba quickly turned as the Castro government began nationalizing U.S. companies in Cuba and took ownership over property previously held by U.S. investors. The first of many economic sanctions relating to the embargo against Cuba was enacted in 1960, and in January the following year President Eisenhower formally ended U.S. relations with Cuba.

Tensions with Cuba rose after the Bay of Pigs invasion, where the CIA secretly trained and supported Cuban dissidents attempt to overthrow the Cuban government, but were captured and defeated in less than three days. In 1961, President John F. Kennedy, with support from legislation, issued further economic restrictions to strengthen the embargo. In 1962, U.S. relations reached an all time low as it was announced that the Soviet Union placed nuclear missiles in Cuba – commonly known as the Cuban Missile Crisis. Less than a year after the crisis was resolved, President Kennedy enacted the Cuban Assets Control Regulations in July 1963. The objective of the CACR was to strip Cuba of any U.S. revenue. Its provisions were comprehensive and effectively ended all economic exchange with Cuba, including travel.

== Travel License under CACR ==
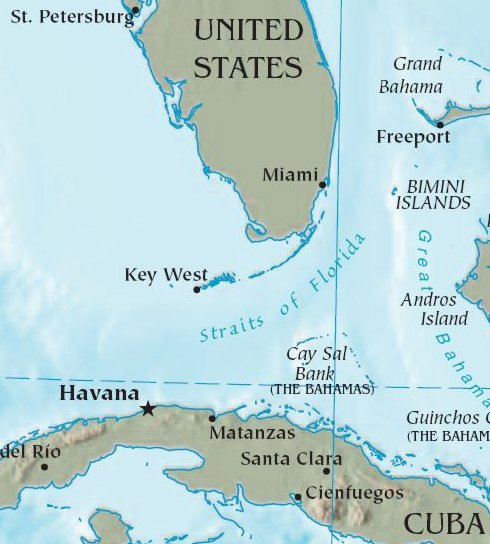
Cuba is 90 miles (145 kilometers) south of Florida, 2006

Licenses and authorization dealing with travel and transactions under the CACR are available and regularly being amended in order to be consistent with the policies of the current President’s administration. A full list of travel licenses and travel-related transactions authorized by the Cuban Assets Control Regulation can be found under the Code of Federal Registration, title 31, subtitle B, chapter 5, part 515, section 560.

As of 2020, travel to Cuba may be authorized either by a general license or on a case-by-case basis by a specific license for travel related to the following activities:

1. Family visits;
2. Official business of the U.S. government, foreign governments, and certain intergovernmental organizations;
3. Journalistic activity;
4. Professional research and professional meetings;
5. Educational activities;
6. Religious activities;
7. Public performances, clinics, workshops, athletic and other competitions, and exhibitions;
8. Support for the Cuban people;
9. Humanitarian projects;
10. Activities of private foundations or research or educational institutes;

== Amendments to the CACR in the 21st Century ==
=== Biden Administration ===
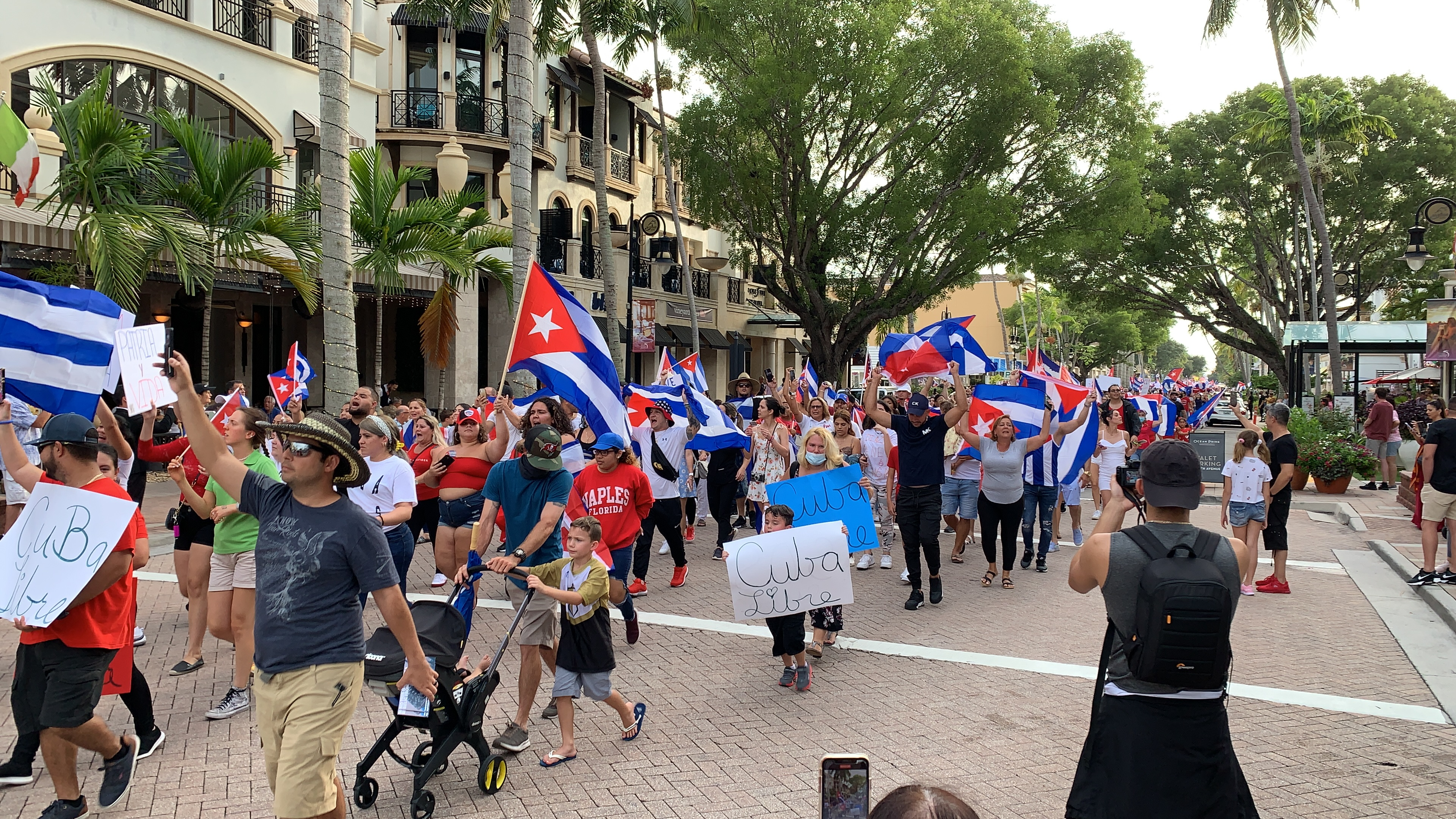
A protest against the Cuban government and in support of the U.S. embargo in Naples, Florida, 2021

Office of Foreign Assets Control amended the Cuban Assets Control Regulations to implement elements of the policy announced by the Biden Administration on May 16, 2022, to increase support for the Cuban people. The rule authorizes “group people-to-people educational travel to Cuba and removes certain restrictions on authorized academic educational activities, authorizes travel to attend or organize professional meetings or conferences in Cuba, removes the $1,000 quarterly limit on family remittances, and authorizes donative remittances to Cuba.”

=== Trump Administration ===
The Trump Administration took a more conservative approach to U.S.-Cuba relations. Even before taking office, Trump promised to reverse the Obama administration's policies calling it a “completely one-sided deal with Cuba." The reversal included restricting most general licenses for people-to-people travel including individual people-to-people educational travel and group people-to-people educational travel. Restrictions on lodging, paying for lodging, or making reservations for lodging at certain properties in Cuba was also added. OFAC amended the CACR under Trump to eliminate U-Turn transactions. Finally, under Trump the OFAC eliminating nonfamily remittances.

=== Obama Administration ===
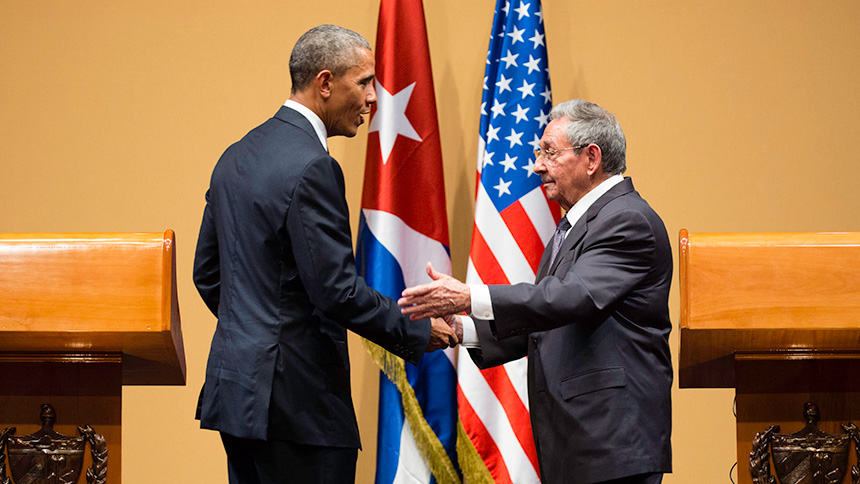
U.S. President Barack Obama and Cuban leader Raul Castro, in Havana, March 2016.

The Obama administration made the most substantial steps in easing the embargo by relaxing as many of the CACR provisions as his authority as the President allowed. Starting on September 8, 2009, OFAC amended the CACR to allow U.S residents to make unlimited trips to visit their relatives in Cuba, and could provide unlimited financial aid to family members living in Cuba. U.S residents were also allowed to send other types of gifts to their families living in Cuba, including clothing and personal hygiene items. In addition, the U.S. government began to grant licenses to U.S. companies so they could provide cellular and television services to Cuba, and allowed Americans to pay for their Cuban relatives to access such services.

Further amendments came in 2011 that expanded permissible travel by allowing religious organizations to sponsor travel to Cuba under a general license, restored and facilitated educational exchanges through a variety of measures, and increased the scope of licenses granted for journalistic activity. New measures allowed nonfamily members to send remittances (as much as $ 500 a quarter) to Cubans so long as they were not provided to senior Cuban government officials or senior members of the Cuban Communist Party. Finally, the new measures allowed U.S. airports to apply for permission to provide services for licensed chartered flights traveling to Cuba.

On January 16, 2015, OFAC once again amended the CACR. The CACR amendments made it easier for the twelve categories of individuals authorized to travel to Cuba to do so, as it permitted them to visit Cuba under a general license, meaning that they would no longer need to apply for a specific license. The new CACR amendments also raised the limit on nonfamily remittances to Cuba from $500 to $ 2,000 per quarter, and allowed U.S. banks to open accounts at Cuban banks to simplify the processing of authorized transactions.

January 27, 2016, new CACR changes removed some restrictions on authorized exports to Cuba, further removed restrictions on travel to Cuba for authorized purposes by allowing some arrangements with Cuban airlines, and authorized more financial transactions related to professional meetings, disaster response projects, informational materials, and transactions related to professional media or artistic productions in Cuba.

The final amendments under the Obama administration were implemented March 16, 2016, OFAC amended the CACR to implement a series of measures designed to "further facilitate travel to Cuba for authorized purposes, expand the range of authorized financial transactions, and authorize additional business and physical presence in Cuba."

=== Bush Administration ===
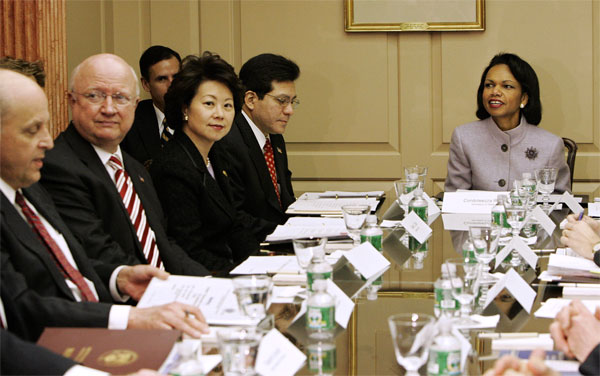
Condoleezza Rice convenes a meeting of the Commission for Assistance to a Free Cuba in December 2005

Under the W. Bush administration the CACR expanded the general license to visit close relatives in Cuba by broadening the definition of "close relative" to include anyone within three degrees of relation. The Bush changes also authorization travelers to carry up to $ 3,000 in remittances, $ 300 for each individual eligible to receive remittances. Amendments to the CACR at this time reflected the goal to aid in the peaceful transition to democracy in Cuba by facilitating "humanitarian" transactions with independent groups in Cuba dedicated to that same goal. These transactions included construction contracts to erect buildings for such groups, and the provision of "civic education" and training in community organizing.

=== Clinton Administration ===
Following Pope John Paul II's historic visit to Cuba in 1998, the Clinton administration amended the CACR in order to “further build” on the U.S. relations with the Cuban people. Such changes include allowing any individual, not just family members, to send money to Cuban households. The amendments also facilitated "people-to-people contact" by streamlining visa approval for academics, athletes, and scientists. In addition, OFAC authorized sales of agricultural products and food to non-governmental entities, such as religious groups, family restaurants, and private farms. While previously under the exclusive control of the Executive, the Cuban Liberty and Democratic Solidarity (LIBERTAD) Act of 1996, known better as the Helms–Burton Act, explicitly codified the embargo into legislation. The bill language specifically states “all restrictions under part 515 of title 31, shall be in effect upon the enactment of this Act."

== Judicial Challenge ==
The landmark opinion on the Cuban Assets Control Regulations comes from the 1984 Supreme Court case Regan v. Wald. Respondents were American citizens who wanted to travel to Cuba. They were inhibited from doing so by a 1982 amendment to the CACR (31 CFR 515.560) which significantly narrowed permissible economic transactions in connection with travel to Cuba. Respondents challenged the amendment to the general license on constitutional and statutory grounds seeking a preliminary injunction against its enforcement.

In a divided 5-4 opinion, the Court denied the injunction and upheld the 1982 amendment. The court held that the Trading With the Enemy Act statutorily granted the President the authority to restrict travel to Cuba. The court noted that at the time of the amendment tensions were high with Cuba and the restrictions put in place out of concern for national security were based in the reality. Not only does Regan v. Wald affirm the Presidents right to place restrictions on travel to Cuba through the Cuban Assets Control Regulation, it also gave future presidents the discretionary power to implement additional restrictions against Cuba using the Cuban Assets Control Regulation.

== Authority ==
The relevant laws are:

- 18 U.S.C. § 2332d
- 22 U.S.C. § 2370(a)
- 22 U.S.C. §§ 6001–6010
- 31 U.S.C. § 321(b)
- U.S.C. App 1–44
- Pub. L. 101–410, 104 Stat. 890, (28 U.S.C. § 2461 note)
- Pub. L. 104–114 (text) (PDF), 110 Stat. 785 (22 U.S.C. § 6082)
- Pub. L. 105–277 (text) (PDF), 112 Stat. 2681
- Pub. L. 106–387 (text) (PDF), 114 Stat. 1549
- Pub. L. 111–8 (text) (PDF), 123 Stat. 524
- Executive Order 9193, 7 FR 5205, 3 CFR, 1938–1943 Comp., p. 1174
- Executive Order 9989, 13 FR 4891, 3 CFR, 1943–1948 Comp., p. 748
- Proc. 3447, 27 FR 1085, 3 CFR, 1959–1963 Comp., p. 157
- Executive Order 12854, 58 FR 36587, 3 CFR, 1993 Comp., p. 614
