= Regan v. Wald =

- Supreme Court of the United States

Argued April 24, 1984 Decided June 28, 1984
- Full case name: Donald Regan, Secretary of the Treasury, et al., Petitioners v. Ruth Wald et al.
- Citations: 468 U.S. 222 (more) 104 S. Ct. 3026; 82 L. Ed. 2d 171

Case history
- Prior: 708 F.2d 794 Ruth Wald, et al., Plaintiffs, Appellants, v. Donald Regan, et al., Defendants, Appellees. No. 82-1695 (1st Cir.)

Holding
- The restrictions on travel-related transactions with Cuba imposed by the 1982 amendment to Regulation 560 do not violate the freedom to travel protected by the Due Process Clause of the Fifth Amendment.

Court membership
- Chief Justice Warren E. Burger Associate Justices William J. Brennan Jr. · Byron White; Thurgood Marshall · Harry Blackmun; Lewis F. Powell Jr. · William Rehnquist; John P. Stevens · Sandra Day O'Connor

Case opinions
- Majority: Rehnquist, joined by Burger, White, Stevens, O'Connor
- Dissent: Blackmun, joined by Brennan, Marshall, Powell
- Dissent: Powell

Laws applied
- U.S. Const. amend. V, Cuban Assets Control Regulations; Trading With the Enemy Act

Regan v. Wald, 468 U.S. 222 (1984), was a United States Supreme Court case in which the Court held by a 5–4 majority that restrictions upon travel to Cuba established as part of the Cuban Assets Control Regulations in 1963 did not violate the freedom to travel protected by the Due Process Clause of the Fifth Amendment.

== Background ==
Ruth Wald, a professor of biology at Harvard University and the wife of former Nobel Prize winner George Wald, planned a trip to Cuba in August 1982 with a group of American women to meet with Cuban women she had met during a previous trip before she was naturalized. However, at that time the Reagan Administration was declaring Cuba off limits to all Americans except a limited category of journalists and US citizens who had relatives living in Cuba. Consequently, Wald's request was denied for 1982. A group of lawyers from a variety of advocacy groups thus launched an appeal against the travel ban, and on May 17, 1983, after the District of Massachusetts had initially upheld the ban, it was overturned by the Court of Appeals for the First Circuit, who said the ban was based on the superseded 1917 Trading With the Enemy Act.

Following the First Circuit's ruling, the Reagan administration immediately filed a petition for a rehearing, which was denied by the First Circuit, which had found that travel was not restricted on July 1, 1977, the date of major amendments to the Trading With the Enemy Act. Consequently, the government appealed to the Supreme Court, which granted the petition for certiorari.

== Supreme Court ruling ==
In a 5–4 ruling written by Justice William Rehnquist, the Supreme Court overturned the First Circuit and ruled that because a broad prohibition on transactions with Cuba existed under the Cuban Assets Control Regulations, travel could be restricted because travel-related transactions with Cuba were transactions with respect to property in which the Cuban government and individual Cubans possess a personal or group interest. The majority argued that a critical issue was how travel to Cuba could provide revenue to advance interests inherently hostile to the United States. The Court consequently held that

there is a strong foreign policy justification for restricting travel to Cuba that is sufficient to restrict the fifth amendment right to travel.

and also that it was important to only permit travel

which does not involve any economic benefit to Cuba

Rehnquist's opinion rejected the opinion of the First Circuit as supposing that the 1977 grandfather clause was supposed to freeze the 1917 Trading With the Enemy Act, when in the opinion of the Court, the provisions of that 1917 Act were preserved. It was also rejected that

the regulation of travel-related purchases must be based on a separate authority from that governing the regulation of other transactions involving property

and also asserted that Presidents Carter and Reagan had wished to maintain the essential restrictions and provisions of the Trading With the Enemy Act.

=== Dissents ===
Justice Blackmun, joined by Justices Brennan, Marshall, and Powell, dissented. Blackmun believed that the 1977 grandfather clause did not encompass the exercise of Presidential power at issue, so that the restrictions on travel to Cuba were an infringement of the right to travel.

Justice Blackmun also argued that the Trading With the Enemy Act lacked necessary provision

to reduce the President's authority to its normal scope when the emergency subsided

and that the grandfather clause was not designed to provide the president with the authority to increase restrictions applicable to an individual country without following the rules of the International Emergency Economic Powers Act. Blackmun also argued that the President cannot have greater flexibility in responding to developments in Cuba than in other areas of political conflict like the Soviet bloc and Middle East, and that under the IEEPA and TWIA, a complete embargo on Cuba was only possible in an extreme emergency.

Justice Powell, besides joining Blackmun's opinion, also wrote a separate dissent, arguing that the travel ban on Cuba may be constitutional because of potential use of hard currency to fund terrorism, but also arguing that the President's role was limited to ascertaining and sustaining the opinions of Congress.

== Criticism ==
Following the issue of Regan v. Wald, the Albany Law Review argued that the case demonstrated a reduced standard of review of presidential authority compared to previous Court decisions in the field, whilst Marcia Weisman argued that the case marked a more radical change from previous jurisprudence, to the point of creating carte blanche for presidential power. Weisman also argued that Regan v. Wald was flawed in relying upon the Iran hostage crisis case Dames & Moore v. Regan because of the unique circumstances of the hostage crisis, and that Rehnquist's opinion was incorrect in focusing upon the regulatory form of the Cuban embargo rather than its substance. Jonathan W. Painter argued that by the “scope-of-inherent-powers” principle it could still be argued that Congress should have the primary role in setting foreign policy.

== See also ==
- List of United States Supreme Court cases, volume 468
