= Trade Sanction Reform and Export Enhancement Act =

The Trade Sanction Reform and Export Enhancement Act (Title IX) was enacted by the United States Congress and signed by President Bill Clinton in 2000. The act altered regulations in regards to U.S. trade with Cuba. Under the act, the trade of certain agricultural commodities (defined and listed under section 102 of the Agricultural Trade Act of 1978) and medicine/medical devices (defined and listed under section 201 of the Federal Food, Drug, and Cosmetic Act) became permitted. This act does not change any legislation in terms of receiving U.S. imports from Cuba. In addition, the act is not comprehensive and still heavily regulates what goods are exported to Cuba.

Trade of any commodities must follow strict regulations. Exports to Cuba can only be paid in cash only sales that are paid in advance and must be financed by third country financial institutions. Credit and debit transactions are not authorized, but foreign banking institutions may finance transactions and U.S. banks may confirm or advise such foreign bank letters or credit. In terms of traveling to trade, travel to and from Cuba can be permitted under this act with special approval for individuals trading any of the commercial goods permitted under the terms of the act. Leisure travel and travel related transactions are still not allowed. In order to travel to Cuba for agricultural or medical trade, a license must be obtained through the Treasury Departments Office and Foreign Assets Control. Any person who violates the terms of the Trade Sanction Reform and Export Enhancement Act will be punished with the terms following the Trading with the Enemy Act. As a result of this act, Cuba has received many goods from the United States. In 2006, Cuba was ranked the 33rd largest market for U.S. agricultural exports.

== See also ==
- Cuba–United States relations
