= Dollarization of Cuba =

Policies implemented for the Cuban economy after 1993

Cuban flag

The government of Cuba implemented macroeconomic policies from 1993 with the aim of stabilizing the Cuban economy. These policies were initially enacted to offset the economic imbalances which was a result of the dissolution of the Soviet Union in 1991. The main aspect of these reforms was to legalize the then illegal United States dollar and regulate its usage in the island's economy.

The wider reforms focused heavily on the macroeconomic stabilization of the Cuban economy. This was to be achieved through a reduction in fiscal deficit, and through structural changes such as the enactment of the Free Farmer's Market agreement, the legalization of self-employment, and the decriminalization of the United States dollar. The economic reforms resulted in a decrease in inflation, appreciation of the peso, increase in output and productivity, and an improvement in the fiscal deficit. With the implementation of the 2019 Cuban constitution came free-market rights, the recognition of private property and the acceptance of foreign direct investment, officially making Cuba a mixed economy similar to the Chinese and Vietnamese models, and similar to the Soviet Union under Lenin with the New Economic Policy.

== Cuban economy prior to reform ==
COMECON logo

The Cuban economy faced its lowest recessions during the War of Independence (1890s), Great Depression (1930s), the Socialist revolution (1960s), and the dissolution of the Soviet Union (1990s).

As tensions between Cuba and the United States increased following the Bay of Pigs invasion and Cuban Missile Crisis, Cuba increasingly turned to the Soviet Union for economic and military aid. From 1970 to 1980, the Soviet Union was fully immersed in Cuba's economic affairs. In 1972, Cuba joined the Council for Mutual Economic Assistance (COMECON), and by the end of the 1980s, 85% of Cuba's foreign trade was with members of COMECON.

From 1985 to 1989, 74.4% of all Cuban exports were sugar and related products. The Cuban economy was highly dependent on sugar, which rendered the country's economy vulnerable to price fluctuations in the world market. Following a surge in world prices, sugar production fell from 7.3 million tons in 1989 to 4.1 million tons in 1993.

For 30 years, Cuba relied on the Soviet Union's subsidies. Towards the end of 1989, Soviet assistance decreased due to the budgetary problems the country was facing at the time. Mikhail Gorbachev, the former General Secretary of the Soviet Union, who later went on to become president, ended the Cuban–Soviet exchange of sugar for oil, and demanded the immediate repayment of the debt. Later in 1991, president Boris Yeltsin put all assistance to Cuba to a halt. Imports fell by 50% from 1990 to 1993, consequently the GDP decreased by 30%.

== Course of reform ==
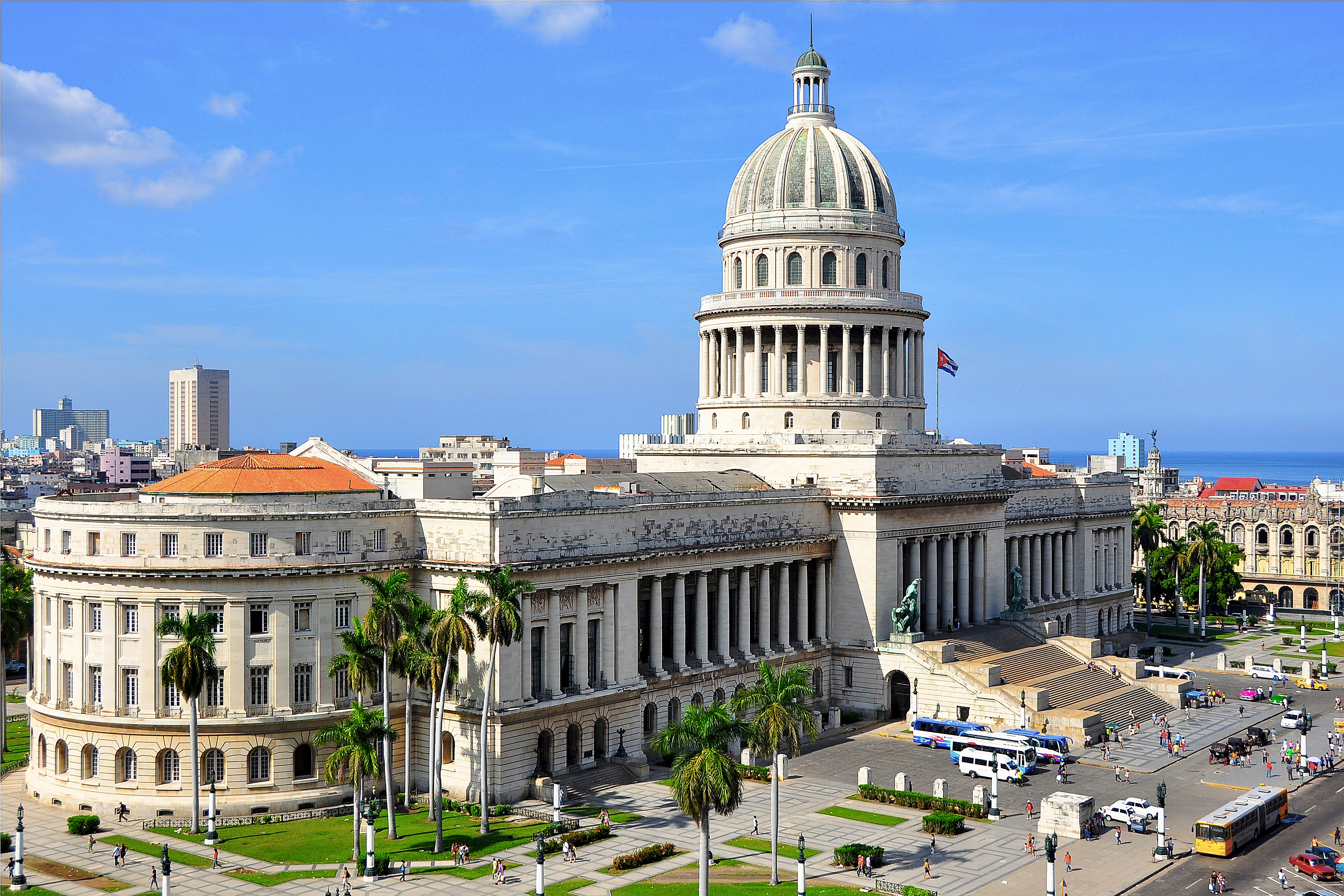
Cuba's National Capitol Building in Havana

The collapse of the Soviet Union sent the Cuban economy into a recession from 1989 to 1993, when it reached its lowest point. In a speculated attempt to re-join the IMF and the World Bank, executive director Jacques de Groote and another IMF official were invited to Havana in late 1993. After assessing the economic situation in the country they concluded that from 1989 to 1993, Cuba's economic decline was more grave than that experienced by any other socialist Eastern European country. During those four years, foreign trade fell by 80%, as more than half of Cuba's trade was done with the Soviet Union, and there was a roughly 50% drop in the country's GDP during that period. President Fidel Castro declared that as of 30 August 1990, the period would be known as the Special Period in Time of Peace (Spanish: período especial en tiempos de paz), which revolved around moving people from urban to rural areas to increase focus on the agricultural sector.

=== 1993–1994 ===
In 1993 the Cuban government legalized the possession and circulation of foreign currency. In July 1993, it was announced was now legal to possess American dollars, through Decree Law no. 140, which was instated on August 13, 1993. The law aimed at stimulating external remittances from Cubans living in the United States to transfer dollars during a time when there was a shortage of dollars in Cuba. This law made it possible for Cubans to sell goods and services to foreigners who were visiting the island and resulted in an increase in capital.

On October 26, 1994, the government established a new system of sales of artisan and manufactured goods at prices equivalent to prices at the free agricultural markets. These allowed individuals and state enterprises to sell goods and services at appointed locations while they were still subjected to transaction tax which was equivalent to sales tax, and they allowed factories to sell surplus from their production. The system was aimed at weakening the black market and stimulating production.

In November 1994, the black market exchange rate fell from CU$120 = US$1 to CU$40 = US$1. By October 1995, exchange bureaus had been created which allowed civilians to buy and sell currencies at rates which were close to black market rates.

In 1993, the government also made strides in promoting foreign investment. On September 8, 1993, the government enacted Decree Law No. 141 on Independent Labour which re-authorized own account work with the aim of increasing the labour supply.

=== 1994–1996 ===
In July 1994, the government introduced bonuses for workers. They provided a US$20 monthly pay package some incentives for workers to stimulate productivity in trade activities namely exports and import substitution (i.e. oil production, electrical generation, biotechnology and cement steel).

On December 20, 1994, the government announced a new free convertible peso, which was on par with the US dollar and could be used in dollar stores, was to exist alongside the old peso, and its ultimate intent was to substitute both the old peso and the dollar.

To combat the fiscal deficit in the country, the government raised the prices of selected goods such as cigarettes, alcoholic beverages and gasoline in 1995. The government also raised the rates for public services such as telephone, transportation and electricity. The government also announced the elimination of some government agencies. 11,600 positions in 32 ministries were eliminated to reduce subsidies.

In 1995, the Cuban government legalised self-employment. This resulted in a fall of government payroll and increase in revenues. The government also announced that as of 1995, taxes will be imposed on real estate, on services such as advertising, on self-employed workers, and on Cuban's whose source of income stems from foreign businesses.

== Reform in specific sectors ==
=== Agriculture ===
On September 30, 1994, the Cuban government enacted its plan to allow free agricultural markets, and more controlled variety of free farmer's markets (MLC). This allowed farmers to once again legally sell the surplus from their yield (except for meat, milk and potatoes) and make profits. This encouraged farms to grow more food and black-market prices slowly fell. Moreover, the conversion of Soviet-style farms into basic cooperative production units freed up 42% of Cuba's usable land. By 1997, roughly 76% of Cuba's usable land was held by cooperatives.

In September 1995, Cuban government decreased subsidies to agriculture, from $370 million in 1994 to $57 million in 1995.

=== Banking ===
Prior to 1997, Cuba's banking system mainly consisted of the Cuban National Bank (Banco Nacional de Cub, BNC), the People's Savings Bank (Banco Popular de Ahorro, BPA) and International Financing Bank (Banco Financiero Internacional, S.A. BFI).

In 1993, the BNC created a private company, New Banking Group (Grupo Nueva Banca, S.A., GNB), to expand financial services available to foreign investors such as credit card operations, provision of the free convertible peso and exchange of bills. The GNB had a network of new financial institutions such as International Bank of Commerce (Banco Internacional de Comercio, S.A., BICSA), National Financier (Financiera Nacional, S.A., FINSA), and Investment Bank (Banco de Inversiones, S.A.).

In 1994, ING began operating in Cuba, making it the first foreign bank to be granted a license to operate in the island. In 1995, two more foreign banks were granted a similar license, namely the Société Genéralé de France and Banco Sabadell from Spain.

In 1997, the Cuban government established a new central bank, the Central Bank of Cuba (Banco Central de Cuba, BCC) with the aim of liberalizing the financial system. Under Decree-Law 172, the new central bank was to maintain monetary stability, preserve the value of the currency and supervise the banking system in Cuba.

By late 1998, 15 foreign banks had opened branch representatives in Cuba.

The banking system was computerized with the introduction of cash dispensing machines and modernized check-clearing systems.

Banco Popular de Ahorro, which mainly focused on loans and savings for families, broadened its services to its activities to commercial banking services and foreign exchange window.

=== Finance ===
Following the decriminalization of the possession of US dollars in 1993, the government created special stores in which individuals who possessed the US dollar could shop for items not available to individuals who only possessed the peso. Moreover, by September 1995, it was possible to deposit hard currency with interest in the Cuban National Bank; by October of that same year, the government had created foreign currency exchange houses (Casas de Cambio, CADECA) with 23 branches throughout the island where Cubans could exchange USD for pesos at a rate similar to that of the black market.

=== Foreign Investment ===
In December 1994, the National Assembly passed a new mining law which aimed at simplifying foreign investment in the mining sector. The following year, the National Assembly introduced a law which innovated the legal framework for foreign investment, by simplifying the evaluating process for future foreign investment, by inhibiting foreign investment in real estate and by authorising the establishment of export processing zones which aim to encourage industrial and promotional activity.

In 1995, the Cuban government signed a trade and investment promotion, and protection agreement with more than 12 countries including Russia, Canada and China. The Havana International Trade Fair attracted 1690 companies from 52 countries. US interest in the island grew. The Economist reported that from 1994 and 1996, 1500 representatives from American firms visited the island.

== Impact ==
After the success of the stabilization program enacted in 1993, Cuba's budget deficit decreased to 1 billion pesos in 1994, 480 million pesos in 1995, and 36 million pesos in 1996.

In 1994, there was as 7.6% growth in the manufacturing sector and a 4.4% growth in the electricity sector. In the following year, 1995, manufacturing sector grew by 6.4% more and there was a 56% and 7.7% growth in mining and construction sectors respectively. The manufacturing sector continued to grow and in 1997 it registered a 7.7% growth in output. In the same year, the construction sector grew by 4.8%, and the transportation and forestry sectors grew by 4.6% and 13.6% respectively.

The reforms also impacted the trade balance of the country. In 1994, exports increased by 18% amounting to roughly $1.3 billion, and imports increased by $2.1billion. In the following years, 1996 and 1997, exports grew to $1.5 and $2.0 billion respectively. Nonetheless the island's imports were growing at a faster rate, registering a 33% growth in 1996 and a 19% growth in 1997.

Moreover, the reforms also brought about a growth in the investment sector. According to an official statement made by Vice President Carlos Lage in November 1994, investments in that year totalled $1.5 billion. In 1995, investments grew from $1.5 billion to $2.1 billion, a 37.5% growth. By the end of 1995, more than 212 foreign investors had started projects in Cuba, and 1996 saw the addition of 48 more internationally funded projects. In August 1995, the Cuban Ambassador to the United Nations, Bruno Rodriguez, reported that 100 American companies had shown interest in state-owned businesses in Cuba. By the end of 1997, the number of internationally funded projects had grown to 317.

In 1989, there were 28,600 licensed self-employed individuals in Cuba; after the legalisation of self-employment in 1995, this number rose to 200,000.

== Criticism ==
The economic reforms were criticised for renouncing the socialist principles on which the country was rebuilt upon after the Cuban revolution, to which Fidel Castro responded by saying "We have not renounced socialism as our common objective. ... We have to be ready to conduct necessary changes to adapt to present world conditions without renouncing our ideas and without renouncing our objectives."

Moreover, the self-employment reform was criticised for not allowing students to be self-employed.

== See also ==
- Economy of Cuba
- Cuba
- Cuba–Soviet Union relations
- Cuba–United States relations
- Special Period
- Fidel Castro
