= Timeline of women's legal rights (other than voting) =

The timeline of women's legal rights (other than voting) represents formal changes and reforms regarding women's rights. The changes include actual law reforms, as well as other formal changes (e.g., reforms through new interpretations of laws by precedents). The right to vote is exempted from the timeline: for that right, see Timeline of women's suffrage. The timeline excludes ideological changes and events within feminism and antifeminism; for that, see Timeline of feminism.

== Before the 21st century ==
- Before the 19th century
- 19th century
- 20th century

== 21st century ==
=== In the 2000s ===
==== 2001 ====
- Zimbabwe: Zimbabwe outlawed marital rape.
- Liechtenstein: Liechtenstein made marital rape illegal in 2001.
- United States: The Mexico City policy, which directed the United States Agency for International Development (USAID) to withhold USAID funds from NGOs that use non-USAID funds to engage in a wide range of activities—including providing advice, counseling or information regarding abortion, or lobbying a foreign government—to legalize or make abortion available, was reinstated by President George W. Bush, who implemented it through conditions in USAID grant awards, and subsequently extended the policy to "voluntary population planning" assistance provided by the Department of State.
- United States: Ferguson v. City of Charleston, 532 U.S. 67 (2001), is a United States Supreme Court decision that found Medical University of South Carolina's policy regarding involuntary drug testing of pregnant women to violate the Fourth Amendment. The Court held that the search in question was unreasonable.
- United States: Nguyen v. INS, 533 U.S. 53 (2001), was a United States Supreme Court case in which the Court upheld the validity of laws relating to U.S. citizenship at birth for children born outside the United States, out of wedlock, to an American parent. The Court declined to overturn a more restrictive citizenship requirement applying to a foreign-born child of an American father and a non-American mother who was not married to the father, as opposed to a child born to an American mother under similar circumstances.
- France: On 4 July, the nationwide ten-week limit on abortion was extended by two weeks.
- France: Minor girls no longer need mandatory parental consent for abortion. A pregnant girl in France under the age of 18 may ask for an abortion without consulting her parents first if she is accompanied to the clinic by an adult of her choice, who must not tell her parents or any third party about the abortion.
- China: China amended its marriage law so that abuse was considered grounds for divorce.
- United Kingdom: The Widowed Mother's Allowance, part of the United Kingdom system of Social Security benefits, was established under the National Insurance Act 1946 and abolished and replaced by Widowed Parent's Allowance.
- Tasmania, Australia: From 1925 until 2001, Tasmania's Criminal Code prohibited "unlawful abortion" without specifically stating what was lawful or vice versa. While it had never actually been prosecuted, it had been held that Victoria's Menhennitt ruling of 1969 and New South Wales' Levine ruling applied in Tasmanian law. In late 2001, the Criminal Code was clarified to state that an abortion must be carried out under a set of criteria resembling those of the South Australian requirements.
- Tasmania, Australia: Tasmania's Evidence Act prohibited publication of information identifying survivors of sexual assault since 2001. In practice, this prevented survivors from speaking publicly about their experiences.

==== 2002 ====
- United States, California: In 2002, the California State Legislature passed a law that said: "The state may not deny or interfere with a woman's right to choose or obtain an abortion prior to viability of the fetus, or when the abortion is necessary to protect the life or health of the woman."
- Nepal: Abortion became legalized in March, under the 11th Amendment to the Civil Code. The legal services were successfully implemented on 25 December 2003. Prior to 2002, Nepal had strict anti-abortion laws which ensured not only the imprisonment of the pregnant women seeking abortion but also their family members. In fact, about 20% of women prisoners were imprisoned for abortion-related choices.
- Malaysia: As a Muslim country, Malaysia has a dual legal system with Muslims being subject to Sharia law. The National Fatwa Council issued a fatwa permitting abortion up to 120 days of gestation in cases when the woman's life is deemed to be in great danger or there is fetal impairment. Abortion on the grounds of rape or incest is still illegal.
- India: Medical Termination of Pregnancy Act, Amendments, 2002
- Switzerland: Abortion was legalized by popular vote after its criminal prohibition had ceased to be observed in practice for some time.
- United Kingdom: Sex Discrimination (Election Candidates) Act 2002
- Benin: Abolition of the requirement that married women must have their husbands' permission to initiate judicial proceeding.
- Nepal: Married daughters under 35 can inherit property.
- United States, Florida: Sultaana Freeman filed a religious discrimination lawsuit against Florida when the state's Department of Highway Safety suspended her license when she refused to be re-photographed without her niqab. Her legal license was suspended without change in policy or law following the September 11, 2001 attacks. Her lawsuit argued that her religious beliefs required her to wear a veil "in front of strangers and unrelated males". It also stated that other states allowed photo-free licenses for religious reasons. Judge Janet C. Thorpe denied her lawsuit that year, and a state appeals court later upheld Thorpe's ruling.
- United States: In Apessos v. Memorial Press Group, a Massachusetts state court made a ruling forbidding employers from firing domestic violence survivors who need to take time off from work to obtain a court order of protection.
- Bangladesh: Bangladesh introduced the death penalty for acid attacks, the Acid Crime Control Act (ACCA), and the Acid Control Act (ACA). The ACCA and ACA are laws that strictly control the sale, use, storage, and international trade of acids. The acids are used in traditional trades carving marble nameplates, conch bangles, goldsmiths, tanneries, and other industries, which have largely failed to comply with the legislation. Salma Ali of the Bangladesh National Women Lawyers' Association derided these laws as ineffective.
- New Zealand: The Queen v Epifania Suluape (2002) NZCA 6, deals with a wife who pleaded provocation after she killed her husband with an axe when he proposed to leave her for another woman. There was some evidence of neglect, humiliation, and abuse but the court concluded that this was exaggerated. On appeal, the court was very conscious of the Samoan culture in New Zealand in restricting the power of the wife to act independently of her husband and reduced her sentence for manslaughter to five years.
- Serbia: Marital rape was criminalized in March; before that date rape was legally defined as forced sexual intercourse outside of marriage.
- Australia, Australian Capital Territory: References to abortion as a criminal offence were repealed by the Crimes (Abolition of Offence of Abortion) Act 2002.

==== 2003 ====
- United States, New Hampshire: In June, the New Hampshire Parental Notification Prior to Abortion Act, "an act requiring parental notification before abortions may be performed on unemancipated minors," was narrowly passed by the New Hampshire General Court. This law was repealed in 2007, making rehearing at the district court level moot.
- United States: Scheidler v. National Organization for Women, 537 U.S. 393 (2003), is a United States Supreme Court case involving whether abortion providers could receive damages from protesters under the Racketeer Influenced and Corrupt Organizations Act (RICO). National Organization for Women (NOW) obtained class status for women seeking the use of women's health clinics and began its court battle against Joseph Scheidler and PLAN et al. in 1986. In this particular case, the court's opinion was that extortion did not apply to the defendants' actions because they did not obtain any property from the respondents (NOW and the class of women).
- Australia: The rights and responsibilities of pregnant and potentially pregnant workers in the workplace were clarified by the Sex Discrimination Amendment (Pregnancy and Work) Act 2003.
- Bosnia and Herzegovina: Before a new Criminal Code came into force in 2003, the law on rape contained a statutory exemption for marriage, and read: "Whoever coerces a female not his wife into sexual intercourse by force or threat of imminent attack upon her life or body or the life or body of a person close to her, shall be sentenced to a prison term of one to ten years".
- United Kingdom: the Female Genital Mutilation Act 2003 (applies to England and Wales and Northern Ireland)
- Canada: Trociuk v British Columbia (AG), [2003] 1 S.C.R. 835 is a leading Supreme Court of Canada decision on section 15(1) of the Canadian Charter of Rights and Freedoms where a father successfully challenged a provision in the British Columbia Vital Statistics Act, which gave a mother complete control over the identity of the father on a child's birth certificate, on the basis that it violated his equality rights.
- Benin: A 2003 law bans all forms of female genital mutilation (FGM).
- Benin: Under Benin's abortion law passed in that year, a woman can only terminate her pregnancy if her life is deemed to be at great risk, if the pregnancy is a result of incest or rape, or if the foetus has a particularly serious medical condition. A select list of experts were allowed to examine a pregnancy to determine whether the only option for saving the woman's life is to induce abortion.
- Niger: A law banning FGM was passed by the government.
- United States: Nevada Department of Human Resources v. Hibbs, 538 U.S. 721 (2003), was a United States Supreme Court case which held that the Family and Medical Leave Act of 1993 was "narrowly targeted" at "sex-based overgeneralization" and was thus a "valid exercise of [congressional] power under Section 5 of the Fourteenth Amendment."
- United States: The Indiana Supreme Court recognized the medical malpractice tort of "wrongful pregnancy" when a woman became pregnant after a failed sterilization procedure. The court decided that the damages may include the cost of the pregnancy but may not include the ordinary cost of raising the child, as the benefits of rearing the child could not be calculated.
- United States: The Partial-Birth Abortion Ban Act of 2003 (Pub. L. 108–105 (text) (PDF), 117 Stat. 1201, enacted November 5, 2003, 18 U.S.C. § 1531, "PBA Ban") is a United States law prohibiting a form of late-term abortion that the Act calls "partial-birth abortion", referred to in medical literature as intact dilation and extraction. Under this law, "Any physician who, in or affecting interstate or foreign commerce, knowingly performs a partial-birth abortion and thereby kills a human fetus shall be fined under this title or imprisoned not more than 2 years, or both."
- England: In R v Charlton (2003) EWCA Crim 415, following threats of sexual and violent abuse against herself and her daughter, the defendant killed her obsessive, jealous, controlling partner while he was restrained by handcuffs, blindfolded and gagged as part of their regular sexual activity. The term of five years' imprisonment was reduced to three and a half years due to the terrifying threats made by a man determined to dominate and control the defendant's life. The threats created a genuine fear for the safety of herself and more significantly, her daughter, and this caused the defendant to lose control and make the ferocious attack.
- Papua New Guinea: Papua New Guinea criminalized marital rape.
- New Zealand: In April, Justice Durie ruled that women seeking medical abortions must take medications in a licensed facility but need not remain there between taking the two sets of tablets, which are taken 48 hours apart. Women also need not stay in the facility until the expulsion of the fetus completes the abortion.
- New Zealand: The Health Practitioners Competence Assurance Act 2003 allows for conscientious objection to abortion by medical professionals.
- India: Medical Termination of Pregnancy Act Rules, 2003

==== 2004 ====
- China, Guizhou: A ban was enacted on abortions in non-medically necessary cases after 14 weeks of pregnancy.
- European Union: Allonby v Accrington & Rossendale College (2004) C-256/01 is a European Union law case concerning the right of men and women to equal pay for work of equal value under Article 141 of the Treaty of the European Community. Part-time lecturers at Accrington and Rossendale College did not have their contracts renewed. They were rehired through an agency, ELS, and said to be "self-employed independent contractors" under the new arrangement. They were denied access to the Teachers Superannuation Scheme. It was apparent that more of the part-time lecturers were women than the staff that remained under permanent contracts with the college. They brought a claim for unfair dismissal and sex discrimination. The ECJ held that despite the contract saying they were self-employed, and despite national legislation under the Equal Pay Act 1970 applying only to employees, workers and those personally performing work (which may have brought the outside the Act's protection) the lecturers did fall within the Community definition of worker. However, while they fell within the category of "worker", their claim failed because she could not point to a comparator that came from the same "single source". Yet the ECJ stated that the rule that only "employees" could join the Teachers' Superannuation Scheme could well be incompatible with Article 141. The rule would be incompatible and should be disapplied if it shown to have an adverse impact on more women than men. If it is disapplied, it is not necessary for the claimant to point to a comparator of the opposite sex working for the same employer who has been adversely affected by the rule.
- Switzerland: The law was changed to allow women to become fighter pilots.
- Botswana: The marital power is abolished by the Abolition of Marital Power Act.
- Mozambique: Abolition of the requirement that married women must have their husbands' permission to initiate judicial proceeding.
- South Africa: Bhe and Others v Magistrate, Khayelitsha and Others; Shibi v Sithole and Others; SA Human Rights Commission and Another v President of the RSA and Another, an important case in South African customary law, was heard in the Constitutional Court on 2 and 3 March, with judgment handed down on 15 October. Chaskalson CJ, Langa DCJ, Madala J, Mokgoro J, Moseneke J, Ngcobo J, O'Regan J, Sachs J, Skweyiya J, Van Der Westhuizen J, and Yacoob J were the presiding judges. The court held that section 23 of the Black Administration Act, in applying the system of male primogeniture, was incompatible with sections 9 (equality) and 10 (dignity) of the Constitution.
- Pakistan: On 8 December, under international and domestic pressure, Pakistan enacted a law that made honor killings punishable by a prison term of seven years, or by the death penalty in the most extreme cases. Women and human rights organizations were, however, skeptical of the law's impact, as it stopped short of outlawing the practice of allowing killers to buy their freedom by paying compensation to the victim's relatives, which was problematic because most honor killings are committed by close relatives.
- France: A law was passed banning "symbols or clothes through which students conspicuously display their religious affiliation" (including hijab) in public primary schools, middle schools, and secondary schools, but this law does not concern universities (in French universities, applicable legislation grants students freedom of expression as long as public order is preserved).
- Austria: Marital rape became a state offense meaning it can be prosecuted by the state even in the absence of a complaint from the spouse, with procedures being similar to stranger rape.
- Switzerland: Marital rape became a state offense.
- New Zealand: Section 38 of the Care of Child Act 2004 allows a young woman under the age of 16 to consent to an abortion but that she must still go through the process outlined in the Contraception, Sterilisation, and Abortion Act 1977 (CS&A Act 1977).

==== 2005 ====
- United States, South Dakota: The state's legislature passed five laws curtailing the legality of abortion.
- New South Wales, Australia: NSW does not have a child destruction enactment, but the Crimes Amendment (Grievous Bodily Harm) Act 2005 (NSW) amended the Crimes Act 1900 (NSW) so that s 4(1)(a) now defines "grievous bodily harm" as including "the destruction (other than in the course of a medical procedure) of the foetus of a pregnant woman, whether or not the woman suffers any other harm".
- United States: The U.S. Deficit Reduction Act of 2005 (implemented in January 2007) prevented college health centers and many health care providers from participating in the drug pricing discount program, which formerly allowed contraceptives to be sold to students and women of low income in the United States at low cost.
- Nepal: Chhaupadi was outlawed by the Supreme Court of Nepal in 2005.
- Scotland: The Prohibition of Female Genital Mutilation (Scotland) Act 2005
- Mexico: Supreme Court rules that forced sex in marriage is rape (marital rape).
- International: The United Nations Human Rights Committee ordered Peru to compensate a woman (known as K.L.) for denying her a medically indicated abortion; this was the first time a United Nations Committee had held any country accountable for not ensuring access to safe, legal abortion, and the first time the committee affirmed that abortion is a human right. K.L. received the compensation in 2016.
- Ethiopia: On 9 May, the new Ethiopian Penal Code came into effect, which removed the marital exemption for kidnapping and rape, largely due to a campaign by Equality Now inspired by Woineshet Zebene's case.
- India: The Protection of Women from Domestic Violence Act, 2005 ("Domestic Violence Act") was passed in order to provide a civil law remedy for the protection of women from domestic violence in India. It was brought into force by the Indian government from 26 October 2006. The Domestic Violence Act provides for the first time in Indian law a definition of "domestic violence", with this definition being broad and including physical violence as well as other forms of violence such as emotional/verbal, sexual, and economic abuse. It is a civil law meant primarily for protection orders and not meant to penalize criminally. The Domestic Violence Act, among other things, outlaws marital rape. However, it offers only a civil remedy for the offence. The act does not extend to Jammu and Kashmir, which has its own laws: the Jammu and Kashmir Protection of Women from Domestic Violence Act was enacted in 2010.
- India: The Hindu Succession (Amendment) Act, 2005, amended Sections 4, 6, 23, 24 and 30 of the Hindu Succession Act, 1956. It revised rules on coparcenary property, giving daughters of the deceased equal rights with sons, and subjecting them to the same liabilities and disabilities. The amendment essentially furthers equal rights between males and females in the legal system.
- United States: McCorvey v. Hill, 385 F.3d 846 (5th Cir. 2004), was a case in which the principal original litigant in Roe v. Wade, (1973) Norma McCorvey, also known as 'Jane Roe', requested the overturning of Roe. The U.S. Court of Appeals for the Fifth Circuit ruled that McCorvey could not do this; the United States Supreme Court denied certiorari on 22 February, rendering the opinion of the Fifth Circuit final.
- United States: The lawsuit Eduardo Gonzalez, et al. v. Abercrombie & Fitch Stores, Inc., et al. (No. C03-2817), filed in June 2003, alleged that the nationwide retailer Abercrombie & Fitch "violated Title VII of the Civil Rights Act of 1964 by maintaining recruiting and hiring practice that excluded minorities and women and adopting a restrictive marketing image, and other policies, which limited minority and female employment." The female and Latino, African-American, and Asian American plaintiffs charged that they were either not hired despite strong qualifications or if hired "they were steered not to sales positions out front, but to low-visibility, back-of-the-store jobs, stocking and cleaning up." In April 2005, the U.S. District Court approved a settlement, valued at approximately $50 million, which requires the retail clothing giant Abercrombie & Fitch to provide monetary benefits to the class of Latino, African American, Asian American and female applicants and employees who charged the company with discrimination. The settlement, rendered as a Consent Decree, also requires the company to institute a range of policies and programs to promote diversity among its workforce and to prevent discrimination based on race or gender. Implementation of the Consent Decree continued into 2011. Abercrombie did not admit liability.
- United States, New York City: New York City Council passed a law requiring all new establishments falling under the terms of the legislation to maintain roughly a two-to-one ratio of women's bathroom stalls to men's stalls and urinals. Existing establishments were required to come into compliance when they undergo extensive renovations, while restaurants, schools, hospitals, and municipal buildings were excluded.
- United States: Jackson v. Birmingham Board of Education, 544 U.S. 167 (2005), is a case in which the United States Supreme Court held that retaliation against a person because that person has complained of sex discrimination is a form of intentional sex discrimination encompassed by Title IX.
- Some countries in Africa: The Protocol to the African Charter on Human and Peoples' Rights on the Rights of Women in Africa, better known as the Maputo Protocol, guarantees comprehensive rights to women including the right to take part in the political process, to social and political equality with men, to control of their reproductive health, and an end to female genital mutilation. As the name suggests, it was adopted by the African Union in the form of a protocol to the African Charter on Human and Peoples' Rights in Maputo, Mozambique. The protocol was adopted by the African Union on 11 July 2003 at its second summit in Maputo. On 25 November 2005, having been ratified by the required 15 member nations of the African Union, the protocol entered into force.
- United States: Castle Rock v. Gonzales, 545 U.S. 748 (2005), was a United States Supreme Court case in which the Court ruled, 7–2, that a town and its police department could not be sued under 42 U.S.C. §1983 for failing to enforce a restraining order, which had led to the murder of a woman's three children by her estranged husband.
- Brazil: Article 107 was repealed; it stated that a perpetrator's penalty was annulled when he married the person he made a victim, according to crimes listed elsewhere in the Code, including rape.
- England and Wales: Equal Opportunities Commission v Secretary of State for Trade and Industry [2007] IRLR 327 was an application for judicial review of the new implementation by the government of the Employment Equality (Sex Discrimination) Regulations 2005. It was alleged, and found by the High Court of England and Wales, that they were incompatible with the Framework Directive, 2000/73/EC.
- Turkey: The rape-marriage law was repealed, as part of efforts to join the European Union.
- Victoria, Australia: The lack of success in raising self-defense in Australia for battered women has meant that provocation has been the main focus of the courts. Based on the Victorian Law Reform Commission's Defences to Homicide: Final Report, the Victorian government announced changes to the homicide laws in that jurisdiction, which are intended to address this perceived imbalance. Under the new laws, victims of family violence will be able to put evidence of their abuse before the court as part of their defense. In addition, they are able to argue self-defense even in the absence of an immediate threat, and where the response of killing involved greater force than the threatened harm.
- China: Sex-selective abortions were banned.
- China: New provisions were added to the Law on Women's Right Protection to include sexual harassment. "The Shanghai Supplement" was drafted to help further define sexual harassment in China.
- Turkey: Marital rape was outlawed.
- Cambodia: Marital rape was outlawed.
- United States, Tennessee: Prior to its repeal in 2005, the law in Tennessee stated that a person could be guilty of the rape of a spouse at a time they are living together only if that person either "was armed with a weapon or any article used or fashioned in a manner to lead the alleged victim to reasonably believe it to be a weapon" or "caused serious bodily injury to the alleged victim". This meant that, in practice, most cases of marital rape could not be prosecuted, since few rapes involve such extreme circumstances. The law was finally repealed, allowing for marital rape to be treated like any other type of rape.
- Thailand: The Medical Council of Thailand issued a regulation in which it explicitly interpreted both physical and mental health as possible factors necessitating abortion.

==== 2006 ====
- Spain: King Juan Carlos I decreed a reform of the succession to noble titles from male-preference primogeniture to absolute primogeniture.
- Liberia: Marital rape was outlawed.
- Nepal: Marital rape was outlawed.
- France: A law, passed 4 April, makes rape by a partner (including in unmarried relationships, marriages, and civil unions) an aggravating circumstance in prosecuting rape.
- Brazil: Brazil's Federal Law 11340, also called Maria da Penha Law (Lei Maria da Penha) – the law against domestic violence against women was enacted.
- India: Protection of Women from Domestic Violence Act 2005 came into force in October.
- Greece: Law 3500/2006 on Combating Domestic Violence criminalizes domestic violence against women, including marital rape. This legislation also prohibits numerous other forms of violence within marriage and cohabiting relations, and various other forms of abuse of women.
- Lesotho: the marital power is abolished by The Married Persons Equality Act 2006.
- United States: Khalid Adem, an Ethiopian American, was both the first person prosecuted and first person convicted for FGM in the United States, stemming from charges that he had personally excised his two-year-old daughter's clitoris with a pair of scissors.
- United States: On 24 November, the Title IX regulations were amended to provide greater flexibility in the operation of single-sex classes or extracurricular activities at the primary or secondary school level.
- United States: Ayotte v. Planned Parenthood of Northern New England, 546 U.S. 320 (2006), was a decision by the Supreme Court of the United States involving a facial challenge to New Hampshire's parental notification abortion law. The First Circuit had ruled that the law was unconstitutional and an injunction against its enforcement was proper. The Supreme Court vacated this judgment and remanded the case, but avoided a substantive ruling on the challenged law or a reconsideration of prior Supreme Court abortion precedent. Instead, the Court only addressed the issue of remedy, holding that invalidating a statute in its entirety "is not always necessary or justified, for lower courts may be able to render narrower declaratory and injunctive relief."
- United States: Jespersen v. Harrah's Operating Co., No. 03-15045 (9th Cir. 14 April 2006, en banc) was a United States federal employment law sex discrimination case. Darlene Jespersen was a 20-year employee at Harrah's Casino in Reno, Nevada. In 2000, Harrah's advanced a "Personal Best" policy, which created strict standards for employee appearance and grooming, which included a requirement that women wear substantial amounts of makeup. Jespersen was fired for non-compliance with its policy. Jespersen argued the makeup requirement was contrary to her self-image, and that the requirement violated Title VII of the Civil Rights Act of 1964. In 2001, Jespersen filed a lawsuit in United States District Court for the District of Nevada, which found against her claim. The district court opined that the policy imposed "equal burdens" on both sexes and that the policy did not discriminate based on immutable characteristics of her sex. The 9th Circuit Court of Appeals affirmed the decision, but on rehearing en banc, reversed part of its decision. The full panel concluded, in contrast to the previous rulings, that such grooming requirements could be challenged as sex stereotyping in some cases, even in view of the decision in Price Waterhouse v. Hopkins. However, the panel found that Jespersen had not provided evidence that the policy had been motivated by stereotyping, and affirmed the district court's finding for Harrah's.
- United States: In Burlington Northern & Santa Fe Railway Co. v. White, the standard for retaliation against a sexual harassment complainant was revised to include any adverse employment decision or treatment that would be likely to dissuade a "reasonable worker" from making or supporting a charge of discrimination.
- United Kingdom: The Equality Act 2006 (c 3) is an act of the Parliament of the United Kingdom covering the United Kingdom. The 2006 act is a precursor to the Equality Act 2010, which combines all of the equality enactments within the United Kingdom and provide comparable protections across all equality strands. Those explicitly mentioned by the Equality Act 2006 include age; disability; gender; proposed, commenced or completed gender reassignment; race; religion or belief and sexual orientation. The changes it made were:
  - creating the Equality and Human Rights Commission (EHRC) (merging the Commission for Racial Equality, the Equal Opportunities Commission and the Disability Rights Commission);
  - outlawing of discrimination on goods and services on the grounds of religion and belief (subject to certain exemptions);
  - allowing the Government to introduce regulations outlawing discrimination on the ground of sexual orientation in goods and services, which led to the Sexual Orientation Regulations 2006;
  - creating a public duty to promote equality on the ground of gender (The Equality Act 2006, section 84, inserting section 76A of the Sex Discrimination Act 1975, now found in section 1 of the Equality Act 2010).
- Canada: Stopps v Just Ladies Fitness (Metrotown) Ltd was a discrimination by sex case heard before the British Columbia Human Rights Tribunal that was significant in Canadian law because it found that a women-only admission policy of a public gym was not discrimination.
- Italy: An injunction was issued against a theatre in Pontedera, Tuscany, by lawyers for Samuel Beckett's estate who did not want female actors to play Vladimir and Estragon in Beckett's play Waiting for Godot. However, in 2006 a court in Rome ruled that the women could play the roles.
- Italy: After a few cases of infibulation practiced by complaisant medical practitioners within the African immigrant community came to public knowledge through media coverage, the Law n°7/2006 was passed on 9 January, becoming effective on 28 January, concerning "measures of prevention and prohibition of any female genital mutilation practice"; the act is also known as the Legge Consolo ("Consolo Act") named after its primary promoter, Senator Giuseppe Consolo. Article 6 of the law integrates the Italian Penal Code with articles 583-Bis and 583-Ter, punishing any practice of female genital mutilation "not justifiable under therapeutical or medical needs" with imprisonment ranging from 4 to 12 years (3 to 7 years for any mutilation other than, or less severe than, clitoridectomy, excision or infibulation). Penalty can be reduced up to 2/3 if the harm caused is of modest entity (i.e. if partially or completely unsuccessful), but may also be elevated up to 1/3 if the victim is a minor or if the offense has been committed for profit. An Italian citizen or a foreign citizen legally resident in Italy can be punished under this law, even if the offense is committed abroad; the law will as well afflict any individual of any citizenship in Italy, even illegally or provisionally. The law also mandates any medical practitioner found guilty under those provisions to have his/her medical license revoked for a minimum of six up to a maximum of ten years.
- Pakistan: In March 2005, the Pakistani parliament rejected a bill which sought to strengthen the law against the practice of honor killing, declaring it to be un-Islamic. The bill was eventually passed in November 2006. However, doubts of its effectiveness remained.
- Pakistan: In Pakistan, the Hudood Ordinances of 1979 subsumed prosecution of rape under the category of zina, making rape extremely difficult to prove and exposing the victims to jail sentences for admitting illicit intercourse. Although these laws were amended in 2006, they still blur the legal distinction between rape and consensual sex. The amending of the laws was done by the Women's Protection Bill.
- Israel: Israel Supreme Court ruled that women should be allowed to deliver eulogies and that the burial societies, or chevra kadisha, should not impose gender segregation in the cemetery. The ruling was in response to an incident in Petach Tikvah in which a woman was stopped from eulogizing her father. However, the court's ruling was not backed up by the Religious Services Ministry until 2012, when Israel's Chief Rabbinical Council ruled that women can deliver eulogies at funerals, but that it is up to the community rabbi to decide on a case-by-case basis.
- Uruguay: Article 116 of the Penal Code, and Articles 22 and 23 of the executive order nº 15.032 were repealed. The articles stated that in crimes of sexual assault, statutory rape, abduction, and disrespect of modesty, the penalty would be extinguished in cases where the assailant and the victim made a matrimonial contract.
- Guatemala: Article 200 stated that a rapist could be exonerated if he promised to marry his victim, provided she had reached the age of 12. It was repealed in 2006.
- Tunisia: The authorities launched a campaign against the hijab, banning it in some public places, where police would stop women on the streets and ask them to remove it, and warn them not to wear it again. The government described the headscarf as a sectarian form of dress which came uninvited to the country.
- United States, Louisiana: Governor Kathleen Blanco signed into law a ban on most forms of abortion (unless the life of the mother was in danger or her health would be permanently damaged) once it passed the state legislature. The bill would only go into effect if the United States Supreme Court reversed Roe v. Wade. Louisiana's measure would allow the prosecution of any person who performed or aided in an abortion. The penalties include up to 10 years in prison and a maximum fine of $100,000.
- United States, Michigan: The Michigan Civil Rights Initiative (MCRI), or Proposal 2 (Michigan 06–2), was a ballot initiative that passed into Michigan Constitutional law. MCRI was a citizen initiative aimed at stopping discrimination based on race, color, sex, or religion in admission to colleges, jobs, and other publicly funded institutions – effectively prohibiting affirmative action by public institutions based on those factors. Its constitutionality was challenged in federal court, but its constitutionality was ultimately upheld by the Supreme Court of the United States.
- Central African Republic: Prior to 2006, law in the Central African Republic explicitly outlawed abortion. In 2006, the National Assembly legalized abortion care in cases of rape, as women regularly faced sexual violence, rape, and gang rape in the war-ravaged country.
- Colombia: After 24 weeks, abortion in Colombia is only allowed in cases where there is deemed to be a very high risk of death to the woman, when there is fetal malformation, or when the pregnancy was the result of rape, according to a Constitutional Court ruling in 2006.
- Guyana: In 2006, the Guyanese government theoretically cleared the way for public hospitals to "perform abortions". In actuality, the public hospitals only complete abortions which have already been partially undertaken by pregnant women. They began doing so in 2008.
- Nicaragua: Abortion in Nicaragua is completely illegal. Prior to a change in the law, which took effect on 18 November, the law allowed pregnancies to be terminated for "therapeutic" reasons, but this clause is no longer in effect.

==== 2007 ====
- United States, New Hampshire: In June 2003, the New Hampshire Parental Notification Prior to Abortion Act, "an act requiring parental notification before abortions may be performed on unemancipated minors," was narrowly passed by the New Hampshire General Court. This law was repealed in 2007, making rehearing at the district court level moot.
- United States, Massachusetts: The Massachusetts legislature passed a law that established a 35-foot buffer zone around abortion clinics. However, this law was struck down in 2014.
- Singapore: Marital rape was legally recognized under certain circumstances that signaled marriage breakdown.
- Malaysia: Marital rape was outlawed.
- Mauritius: Marital rape was outlawed.
- Ghana: Marital rape was outlawed.
- Costa Rica: Law on Criminal Sanctions for Violence Against Women (Ley de Penalización de la Violencia Contra las Mujeres).
- Costa Rica: Costa Rica repealed its marry-your-rapist law. The law was Article 92, which stated that punishment of an accused or condemned person would be cancelled if he married his underage victim, if legally possible and no objections existed from her legal representatives and the National Children's Fund.
- New Zealand: Human Rights (Women in Armed Forces) Amendment Act 2007
- Venezuela: Organic Law on the Right of Women to a Life Free of Violence (Ley Organica Sobre el Derecho de las Mujeres a una Vida Libre de Violencia) was enacted.
- England and Wales and Northern Ireland: The Forced Marriage (Civil Protection) Act 2007 (applicable in England and Wales, and in Northern Ireland) was passed, which enables the victims of forced marriage to apply for court orders for their protection.
- Egypt: The June 2007 Ministry ban on FGM eliminated a loophole that allowed girls to undergo the procedure for health reasons.
- Eritrea: All forms of FGM were outlawed with Proclamation 158/2007 in March.
- United States: Gonzales v. Carhart, 550 U.S. 124 (2007), is a United States Supreme Court case that upheld the Partial-Birth Abortion Ban Act of 2003.
- United States: Ledbetter v. Goodyear Tire & Rubber Co., 550 U.S. 618 (2007), is an employment discrimination decision of the Supreme Court of the United States, stating that employers cannot be sued under Title VII of the Civil Rights Act of 1964 over race or gender pay discrimination if the claims are based on decisions made by the employer 180 days ago or more. Justice Alito held for the five-justice majority that each paycheck received did not constitute a discrete discriminatory act, even if affected by a prior decision outside the time limit. Ledbetter's claim of the "paycheck accrual rule" was rejected. The decision did not prevent plaintiffs from suing under other laws, like the Equal Pay Act, which has a three-year deadline for most sex discrimination claims, or 42 U.S.C. 1981, which has a four-year deadline for suing over race discrimination.
- United States, California: In 2007, Michael Buday and Diana Bijon enlisted the American Civil Liberties Union and filed a discrimination lawsuit against the state of California. According to the ACLU, the obstacles facing a husband who wishes to adopt his wife's last name violated the equal protection clause provided by the 14th Amendment of the Constitution. At the time of the lawsuit, only the states of Georgia, Hawaii, Iowa, Massachusetts, New York and North Dakota explicitly allowed a man to change his name through marriage with the same ease as a woman. As a result of the lawsuit, the Name Equality Act of 2007 was passed to allow either spouse to change their name, using their marriage license as the means of the change; the law took effect in 2009.
- New Zealand: The Human Rights (Women in Armed Forces) Amendment Act 2007 is an Act of Parliament passed in New Zealand in 2007. It removed an exemption from the Human Rights Act 1993 which barred women from serving in combat roles in the New Zealand Defence Force.
- Portugal: The Parliament of Portugal voted to legalize abortion during the first ten weeks of pregnancy. This followed a referendum that, while revealing that a majority of Portuguese voters favored legalization of early-stage abortions, failed due to low voter turnout. The second referendum passed, however, and President Cavaco Silva signed the measure into effect in April 2007.
- Mexico City: The government of Mexico City legalizes abortion during the first 12 weeks of pregnancy, and offers free abortions. On 28 August 2008, the Mexican Supreme Court upholds the law.
- Thailand: Thailand outlawed marital rape in 2007.
- Sierra Leone: On 14 June 2007, the Parliament of Sierra Leone passed three laws which made wife-beating illegal, allowed women to inherit property and protected women from forced marriage.

==== 2008 ====
- Mexico, Baja California and San Luis Potosí: The states of Baja California and San Luis Potosí enacted laws in 2008 bestowing "personhood" rights from the moment of conception.
- Turkey: On 7 February 2008, the Turkish Parliament passed an amendment to the constitution, allowing women to wear the headscarf in Turkish universities, arguing that many women would not seek an education if they could not wear the hijab. The decision was met with powerful opposition and protests from secularists. On 5 June 2008, the Constitutional Court of Turkey reinstated the ban on constitutional grounds of the secularity of the state.
- International: In 2008, the U.N. Security Council adopted Resolution 1820, which noted that "rape and other forms of sexual violence can constitute war crimes, crimes against humanity or a constitutive act with respect to genocide".
- Guatemala: enacts Law against Femicide and Other Forms of Violence Against Women (Ley contra el Femicidio y otras Formas de Violencia Contra la Mujer).
- Colombia: enacts Law 1257 of 2008 for establishing rules of awareness, prevention and punishment of all forms of violence and discrimination against women (Ley 1257 de 2008, por la cual se dictan normas de sensibilización, prevención y sanción de formas de violencia y discriminación contra las mujeres).
- Saudi Arabia: In 2008, women were allowed to enter hotels and furnished apartments without their mahram if they had their national identification cards.
- Nicaragua: Article 196, repealed in 2008, stated that if a rape victim marries the offender or grants a pardon, the procedure was suspended and the sentence imposed was cancelled.
- Panama: Article 225, repealed in 2008, stated that a rapist could marry his victim (aged 14 or older) in order to avoid potential charges.
- Pakistan: Pakistan's Dowry and Marriage Gifts (Restriction) Bill, 2008, restricts dowry to PKR 30,000 (~US$300) while the total value of bridal gifts is limited to PKR 50,000. The law made demands for a dowry by the groom's family illegal, as well as public display of dowry before or during the wedding. However, this and similar anti-dowry laws of 1967, 1976 and 1998, as well as Family Court Act of 1964 have proven to be unenforceable.
- United States, Maryland: Maouloud Baby v. State of Maryland (aka Maryland v. Baby) is a Maryland state court case relating to the ability to withdraw sexual consent. The jury in the trial court convicted Baby of first degree rape and related charges, but the Court of Special Appeals, based upon a 1980 precedent that held that a rape could not legally occur if a woman withdrew consent after penetration, reversed the conviction. That precedent interpreted the English common law such that the withdrawal of consent following initial penetration did not make the act a rape. The court noted other states had noted that the act of intercourse is not completed at the initial penetration, and so consent could be withdrawn at any point during intercourse. For rape, the court noted that force or threat of force was a necessary element of the crime. Due to issues involving the instructions to the jury regarding rape and consent, the case was remanded for a new trial. In 2008, the Court of Appeals affirmed the Court of Special Appeals' reversal of the convictions and remand for re-trial, due to the trial court's error in failing to answer the jury's questions about whether a sex act continued after the withdrawal of consent could constitute rape if penetration had already occurred. However, the court ruled that consent could be withdrawn at any time, even if the victim had initially consented.
- United States: In 2008 the Federal Bureau of Prisons mandated that in all federal correctional facilities, "inmates in labor, delivery, or post-delivery recuperations shall not be placed in restraints unless there are reasonable grounds to believe the inmate presents an immediate serious threat of hurting herself or others, or there are reasonable grounds to believe the inmate presents an immediate and credible risk of escape."
- United States: In April 2008, President George W. Bush signed the Second Chance Act into law, requiring all federal facilities to document and report "the use of physical restraints on pregnant female prisoners during pregnancy, labor, delivery, and post-delivery and justify the use of restraints with documented security concerns".
- United States, Nebraska: (1) The state shall not discriminate against, or grant preferential treatment to, any individual or group on the basis of race, sex, color, ethnicity, or national origin in the operation of public employment, public education, or public contracting.[...] (3) Nothing in this section prohibits bona fide qualifications based on sex that are reasonably necessary to the normal operation of public employment, public education, or public contracting. – Nebraska Constitution, Article I, §30 (2008).
- Australia, Victoria: The Australian state of Victoria passed a bill which decriminalized abortion, making it legally accessible to women in the first 24 weeks of the pregnancy. This was the Abortion Law Reform Act 2008, and it also abolished the offense of child destruction.
- Sweden: The Swedish Discrimination Act (2008:567) was enacted in 2008 and states in part that: "the purpose of the Act is to combat discrimination and in other ways promote equal rights and opportunities regardless of sex...".

==== 2009 ====
- East Timor: Abortion in East Timor is only legal if the abortion will save the woman's life, an exception made by Parliament in 2009.
- Montenegro: Abortion in Montenegro is legal on request during the first ten weeks of pregnancy. Between 10 and 20 weeks, abortions must be approved a committee, and may only be performed for medical reasons, if the child is expected to be born with serious disabilities, if the pregnancy is the result of a crime, or if the woman could face serious family circumstances during pregnancy or after birth. Between 20 and 32 weeks, abortions must be approved by an ethics committee, and are only granted for medical reasons or in the case of serious fetal defects; after 32 weeks, abortions can only be permitted to save the pregnant woman's life. The current abortion law, which dates from 2009, repealed the previous 1977 law enacted by Yugoslavia.
- Monaco: Abortion in Monaco is only allowed in cases of rape, fetal deformity, illness, or fatal danger to the mother. The most recent abortion legislation was enacted on 8 April 2009; before then Monaco had one of the strictest abortion laws in Europe, only allowing the procedure if there was deemed to be a very high risk of fatality for the woman.
- Honduras: A law to prohibit the morning-after pill was signed into law after the 2009 Honduran coup d'état.
- Dominican Republic: Abortion has been constitutionally prohibited since 18 September 2009, when a constitutional amendment declaring the right to life as "inviolable from conception until death" was approved in Congress by a majority vote of 128 to 34.
- Suriname: Suriname outlawed marital rape.
- Rwanda: Rwanda outlawed marital rape.
- Argentina: enacts The Comprehensive Law on the Prevention, Punishment and Elimination of Violence against Women in their Interpersonal Relations [Law 26.485] ( Ley de protección integral para prevenir, sancionar y erradicar la violencia contra las mujeres en los ámbitos en que desarrollen sus relacion es interpersonales [Ley 26.485]), which protects women from violence against women and domestic violence.
- Uganda: FGM banned.
- United States: The Lilly Ledbetter Fair Pay Act of 2009 (Pub. L. 111–2 (text) (PDF), S. 181) is a federal statute in the United States that was the first bill signed into law by President Barack Obama on 29 January 2009. The Act amends the Civil Rights Act of 1964. The act states that the 180-day statute of limitations for filing an equal-pay lawsuit regarding pay discrimination resets with each new paycheck affected by that discriminatory action. The law directly addressed Ledbetter v. Goodyear Tire & Rubber Co., 550 U.S. 618 (2007), a U.S. Supreme Court decision that the statute of limitations for presenting an equal-pay lawsuit begins on the date that the employer makes the initial discriminatory wage decision, not at the date of the most recent paycheck.
- United States: The Mexico City Policy was rescinded 23 January 2009, three days after President Barack Obama took office.
- Sudan: In 2009, journalist Lubna Hussein was fined the equivalent of $200 when a court found her guilty of violating Sudan's decency laws by wearing trousers.
- Nepal: In 2009, Nepal enacted the Social Customs and Practices Act outlawing dowry.
- United States: Crawford v. Metropolitan Government of Nashville, 555 U.S. 271 (2009), is a United States Supreme Court case in which the Court unanimously ruled that Title VII of the 1964 Civil Rights Act protects an employee who opposes unlawful sexual harassment, but does not report the harassment him or herself.
- United States: The Matthew Shepard and James Byrd Jr. Hate Crimes Prevention Act, also known as the Matthew Shepard Act, is an American Act of Congress, passed on 22 October, and signed into law by President Barack Obama on 28 October as a rider to the National Defense Authorization Act for 2010 (H.R. 2647). Conceived as a response to the murders of Matthew Shepard and James Byrd Jr., the measure expands the 1969 United States federal hate-crime law to include crimes motivated by a victim's actual or perceived gender, sexual orientation, gender identity, or disability.
  The bill also:
  - Removes the prerequisite that the victim be engaging in a federally protected activity, like voting or going to school;
  - Gives federal authorities greater ability to engage in hate crimes investigations that local authorities choose not to pursue;
  - Provided $5 million per year in funding for fiscal years 2010 through 2012 to help state and local agencies pay for investigating and prosecuting hate crimes;
  - Requires the Federal Bureau of Investigation (FBI) to track statistics on hate crimes based on gender and gender identity (statistics for the other groups were already tracked).
- United States: Section 3A1.1 of the 2009 United States Sentencing Guidelines states that: "If the finder of fact at trial or, in the case of a plea of guilty or nolo contendere, the court at sentencing determines beyond a reasonable doubt that the defendant intentionally selected any victim or any property as the object of the offense of conviction because of the actual or perceived race, color, religion, national origin, ethnicity, gender, disability, or sexual orientation of any person," the sentencing court is required to increase the standard sentencing range.
- Kosovo: The hijab was banned in public schools and universities or government buildings.
- France: In 2006, a French Muslim man sought an annulment on the grounds that his bride (also Muslim) turned out not to be a virgin. She denied having misled him, but did not contest the appeal, which was duly granted. However, in 2009, French justice minister Rachida Dati ordered the government to appeal this decision (on the grounds that an important element of French public policy was at issue). The appeals court reversed the judgment. As explained by writer Ronald Sokol, "The government argued that the wife's virginity was not an essential condition because her unchaste past has no effect on married life. The judges agreed. Even if she had lied, they said, it did not matter, as a woman's lies about her past love affairs are not matters essential to her married life. In short, a woman's past is her own." It became known as the "Virginity Lie" case.
- Spain: In Spain a bill decriminalizes abortion, making it legally accessible to women in the first 14 weeks of the pregnancy.
- Denmark: Succession to the throne is by a change in the law in 2009 governed by absolute primogeniture.

==== 2010 ====
- United States, Florida: Burton v. Florida, 49 So.3d 263 (2010), was a Florida District Court of Appeals case ruling that the court cannot impose unwanted treatment on a pregnant woman "in the best interests of the fetus" without providing evidence of fetal viability.
- Gaza: In 2010 the Hamas-led Islamist government of Gaza imposed a ban on women smoking the popular nargilas in public. A spokesman for the Interior Ministry explained that "It is inappropriate for a woman to sit cross-legged and smoke in public. It harms the image of our people." The ban was soon lifted later that year.
- Fiji: In 2010, abortions to end pregnancies that are a result of rape or incest became legally available to women.
- United States: In United States v. Jardee it was ruled that the threat of being subjected to the Domestic Violence Offender Gun Ban did not turn an otherwise "petty" crime into a "serious" one requiring a jury trial.
- United States: Section 4207 of the Patient Protection and Affordable Care Act amended the Fair Labor Standards Act and required employers to provide a reasonable break time for an hourly employee to breastfeed her child if the child is less than one year old. The employee must be allowed to breastfeed in a private place, other than a bathroom. The employer is not required to pay the employee during the break time. Employers with fewer than 50 employees are not required to comply with the law if doing so would impose an undue hardship to the employer based on its size, finances, nature, or structure of its business.
- United States: Sex discrimination was outlawed in health insurance.
- United Kingdom: The Equality Act 2010 is an Act of Parliament of the United Kingdom, and has the same goals as the four major EU Equal Treatment Directives, whose provisions it mirrors and implements. The primary purpose of the Act is to codify the complicated and numerous array of Acts and Regulations, which formed the basis of anti-discrimination law in the United Kingdom. This was, primarily, the Equal Pay Act 1970, the Sex Discrimination Act 1975, the Race Relations Act 1976, the Disability Discrimination Act 1995 and three major statutory instruments protecting discrimination in employment on grounds of religion or belief, sexual orientation and age. It requires equal treatment in access to employment as well as private and public services, regardless of the protected characteristics of age, disability, gender reassignment, marriage and civil partnership, race, religion or belief, sex, and sexual orientation. In the case of gender, there are special protections for pregnant women. The Act does not guarantee transsexuals' access to gender-specific services where restrictions are "a proportionate means of achieving a legitimate aim". In the case of disability, employers and service providers are under a duty to make reasonable adjustments to their workplaces to overcome barriers experienced by disabled people. In this regard, the Equality Act 2010 did not change the law. Under s.217, with limited exceptions the Act does not apply to Northern Ireland.
- United States: Executive Order 13535 is an executive order announced by President Barack Obama on 21 March 2010, and signed on 24 March. It reinforces a commitment to preservation of the Hyde Amendment's policy restricting federal funds for abortion within the context of recent health care legislation. The order was signed after an agreement with anti-abortion Democratic Congressman Bart Stupak, who had said he and several other anti-abortion Democrats in the House of Representatives would not support the Patient Protection and Affordable Care Act unless the Bill's language prohibiting federal funding of abortions was strengthened.
- Punjab: In September 2010, the Punjab law minister announced that violent crimes against women, including honor killings, would be tried under the country's Anti-Terrorism Act.
- International: United Nations Security Council Resolution 1960, was adopted unanimously on 16 December 2010, after recalling resolutions 1325 (2000), 1612 (2005), 1674 (2006), 1820 (2008), 1882 (2009), 1888 (2009), 1889 (2009) and 1894 (2009), the Council requested information on parties suspected of patterns of sexual violence during armed conflict to be made available to it. The resolution was sponsored by 60 countries. Its adoption was praised by Human Rights Watch, which called it "a tremendous step toward ending this horrendous practice".
- Jammu and Kashmir: enacted in 2010 the Jammu and Kashmir Protection of Women from Domestic Violence Act, 2010.
- Israel: On 28 September 2010, the Israeli Supreme Court outlawed public gender segregation in Jerusalem's Mea Shearim neighborhood in response to a petition submitted after extremist Haredi men physically and verbally assaulted women for walking on a designated men's only road. However, in January 2011, a ruling of the Israeli High Court of Justice allowed the continuation of the gender segregation in public buses on a strictly voluntary basis for a one-year experimental period.
- France: A ban on face covering, targeting especially women wearing chador and burka, was adopted by the French Parliament.
- Australia: In a Western Australian case in July 2010, a woman sought to give evidence in court wearing a niqab. The request was refused on the basis that the jury needs to see the face of the person giving evidence.
- Syria: In 2010, Ghiyath Barakat, Syria's minister of higher education, announced a ban on women wearing full-face veils at universities. The official stated that the face veils ran counter to secular and academic principles of Syria.
- United States, jurisdiction of the United States Court of Appeals for the Eleventh Circuit: In Reeves v. C.H. Robinson Worldwide, Inc. the United States Court of Appeals for the Eleventh Circuit ruled that a hostile work environment can be created in a workplace where sexually explicit language and pornography are present. A hostile workplace may exist even if it is not targeted at any particular employee.
- United States, Oklahoma: Sex-selective abortions were banned in Oklahoma.
- Scotland: Upskirting became a specific offence in Scotland under the Criminal Justice and Licensing (Scotland) Act 2010. This Act, which was passed by the Scottish Parliament, extended the definition of voyeurism to cover upskirting.
- Chile: In Chile, came into force the Morning After Pill Law, which set the rules on information, advice and services relating to fertility regulation, allowing the free distribution of the pill in all country public clinics.
- Kenya: The 2010 Kenyan constitutional referendum that introduced article 26 broadened access to abortion by allowing it for maternal health reasons.
- Ireland: A, B and C v Ireland is a landmark 2010 case of the European Court of Human Rights on the right to privacy under Article 8 of the European Convention on Human Rights. The court rejected the argument that article 8 conferred a right to abortion, but found that Ireland had violated the European Convention on Human Rights by failing to provide an accessible and effective procedure by which a woman can have established whether she qualifies for a legal abortion under current Irish law.
- Spain: On 3 March 2010, the Organic Law 2/2010 on sexual and reproductive health and abortion was promulgated.
- Malaysia: In April 2010, the Minister of Women, Family and Community Development Shahrizat Abdul Jalil announced that the Government had classified "baby dumping" as a capital punishment offence. In response, the Prime Minister Najib Razak clarified that the Attorney General would only be prescribing the death penalty on a case-by-case basis.
- United States, Nebraska: In 2010, Nebraska became the first state to use the disputed notion of fetal pain as a rationale to ban abortion after 20 weeks.

=== 2010s ===
==== 2011 ====
- United States, New Hampshire: A New Hampshire parental notification law for abortion was passed again in 2011 after the Republican-controlled House and Senate overrode Democratic governor John Lynch's veto.
- Egypt: Virginity tests done by the military on detainees were banned in Egypt on 27 December 2011.
- European Union: Association belge des Consommateurs Test-Achats ASBL v Conseil des ministres (2011) C-236/09 is a decision of the European Court of Justice which invalidated a provision of Directive 2004/113/EC of the European Union which permitted the continence of sexual discrimination in the provision of insurance services provided that it was based on "relevant and accurate actuarial and statistical data." The practical result of the decision was the prohibition of sexual discrimination in insurance policies.
- Canada: On 12 December 2011, the Canadian Minister of Citizenship and Immigration issued a decree banning the niqab or any other face-covering garments for women swearing their oath of citizenship; the hijab was not affected. This edict was later overturned by a Court of Appeal on the grounds of being unlawful.
- Australia: In September 2011, Australia's most populous state, New South Wales, passed the Identification Legislation Amendment Act 2011 to require a person to remove a face covering if asked by a state official. The law is viewed as a response to a court case of 2011 where a woman in Sydney was convicted of falsely claiming that a traffic policeman had tried to remove her niqab.
- Australia: In Queensland the partial defense of provocation in section 304(1) of the Criminal Code was amended in 2011, in order to "reduce the scope of the defense being available to those who kill out of sexual possessiveness or jealousy".
- El Salvador: Enacts Law for a Life Free of Violence against Women (Ley Especial Integral para una Vida Libre de Violencia para las Mujeres).
- Afghanistan: In 2010 and 2011, the Afghan Supreme Court issued instructions to courts to charge women with "running away" as a crime. This makes it nearly impossible for women to escape forced marriages.
- Scotland: The Forced Marriage etc. (Protection and Jurisdiction) (Scotland) Act 2011 gives courts the power to issue protection orders.
- United States: Wal-Mart v. Dukes, 564 U.S. ___ (2011), was a United States Supreme Court case. The case was an appeal from the Ninth Circuit's decision in Dukes v. Wal-Mart Stores, Inc. in which the Supreme Court, by a 5–4 decision, reversed the district court's decision to certify a class action lawsuit in which the plaintiff class included 1.6 million women who currently work or have worked for Wal-Mart stores, including the lead plaintiff, Betty Dukes. Dukes, a current Wal-Mart employee, and others alleged gender discrimination in pay and promotion policies and practices in Wal-Mart stores. The Court agreed to hear argument on whether Federal Rule of Civil Procedure, Rule 23(b)(2), which provides for class-actions if the defendant's actions make injunctive relief appropriate, can be used to file a class action that demands monetary damages. The Court also asked the parties to argue whether the class meets the traditional requirements of numerosity, commonality, typicality, and adequacy of representation. The Supreme Court ruled unanimously that the class should not be certified in its current form but was only 5–4 on the reason for that and whether the class could continue in a different form.
- Guinea-Bissau: A law banning the practice of FGM nationwide was made in 2011.
- Russia: On 21 October 2011, the Russian Parliament passed a law restricting abortion to the first 12 weeks of pregnancy, with an exception up to 22 weeks if the pregnancy was the result of rape, and for medical necessity it can be performed at any point during pregnancy. The new law also made mandatory a waiting period of two to seven days before an abortion can be performed, to allow the woman to "reconsider her decision". Abortion can only be performed in licensed institutions (typically hospitals or women's clinics) and by physicians who have specialized training. The physician can refuse to perform the abortion, except the abortions for medical necessity. The new law is stricter than the previous one, in that under the former law abortions after 12 weeks were allowed on broader socioeconomic grounds, whereas under the current law such abortions are only allowed if there are serious medical problems with the woman or fetus, or in case of rape.
- Luxembourg: The preference for men over women in succession to Luxembourg's throne was abandoned in favour of absolute primogeniture on 20 June 2011 by decree of Grand Duke Henri.
- Iraqi Kurdistan: A 2011 Kurdish law criminalized FGM practice in Iraqi Kurdistan.
- France: In France, by executive decision since 2011 and by law since 2013, any married person may officially use their spouse's name as a common name by substituting or compounding it to their own. Before this it was common for married women to use their husband's name in everyday life but this had no legal recognition.
- Japan: Emergency contraceptive pills were approved by the Ministry of Health, Labour and Welfare of Japan in 2011; they require a prescription from a doctor.

==== 2012 ====
- United States, Oklahoma: A heartbeat bill (SB 1274) was signed into law by then-Oklahoma governor Mary Fallin in 2012 that required an abortion provider to offer a woman the opportunity to hear the conceptus' pulse before ending the pregnancy, and applied when the conceptus was at least eight weeks old. The bill took effect later in 2012.
- United States, New Hampshire: New Hampshire passed a law in 2012 which required minors to wait 48 hours after requesting an abortion but no longer required parental consent.
- United States, Arizona: Arizona Governor Jan Brewer signed into law in April 2012 abortion restrictions that prohibited the procedure after 20 weeks. The U.S. Ninth Circuit Court of Appeals overturned this law in January 2015, but it remains on the books.
- Luxembourg: A woman who determines herself to be "in distress" can obtain an abortion after two consultations with a doctor, one medical and one psycho-social, and a waiting period of at least three days. An abortion at later stages can only be obtained when two doctors certify there is a danger to the woman or fetus. Before reforms passed in 2012, only a doctor could determine if a woman was "in distress". Abortions in the first twelve weeks were only permitted in the event of a severe physical or mental health threat to the woman, a serious risk that the child would be born with a serious disease or serious defects, or a pregnancy resulting from rape. Under-age patients needed to obtain parental consent for an abortion, and abortions could only be performed in hospitals and clinics.
- Guam: The Woman's Reproductive Health Information Act was passed, creating new restrictions for abortion provision, including a 13-week gestational age limit, a physician-only requirement, and a 24-hour mandatory waiting period.
- Ireland: The Criminal Justice (Female Genital Mutilation) Act 2012 bans FGM.
- Nicaragua: Enacts Law no 779- Integral Law against Violence against Women (Ley Integral contra la Violencia hacia la Mujer).
- Nicaragua: Nicaragua outlawed marital rape. Sierra Leone (2012),
- Sierra Leone: The Special Court for Sierra Leone Trial Chamber in the Charles Taylor decision found that the term 'forced marriage' should be avoided and rather described the practice in war as 'conjugal slavery' (2012).
- United States, South Dakota: In Planned Parenthood v. Rounds (2012), the United States Court of Appeals for the Eighth Circuit ruled that a South Dakota law requiring doctors to give patients information about the potential suicide risk in women who have abortions was not unconstitutional.
- United States: A provision of the Provisions of the Patient Protection and Affordable Care Act, effective 1 August 2012, states that all new health insurance plans must cover certain preventive services such as mammograms and colonoscopies without charging a deductible, co-pay or coinsurance. Women's Preventive Services – including: well-woman visits; gestational diabetes screening; human papillomavirus (HPV) DNA testing for women age 30 and older; sexually transmitted infection counseling; human immunodeficiency virus (HIV) screening and counseling; FDA-approved contraceptive methods and contraceptive counseling; breastfeeding support, supplies and counseling; and domestic violence screening and counseling – will be covered without cost sharing. The requirement to cover FDA-approved contraceptive methods is also known as the contraceptive mandate.
- Botswana: Mmusi and Others v Ramantele and Another is a 2012 case of the High Court of Botswana in which three sisters disputed their nephew's right to inherit the family home under customary inheritance laws that favored male descendants. The court ruled that these laws were unconstitutional, asserting for the first time the right of Batswana women to inherit property.
- Morocco: Morocco amended Article 475, which provided between one- and five-year prison sentence for a perpetrator that abducted or deceived a minor with no resort to violence or threat, or attempted to do so. The Article included a second clause that permitted the withdrawal of a persecution if the perpetrator married the girl or woman. The Parliament abolished the law in 2014 as it was considered to be at odds with the 2011 constitution.
- Argentina: Article 132 of the Argentine Penal Code stated that if a rape victim over the age of 16 agreed to marry her rapist, he could be freed from prison. This law was repealed in 2012.
- United States: In Coleman v. Maryland Court of Appeals, the Supreme Court ruled that the Family Medical Leave Act's self-care leave provision is not enforceable against states; the court did not agree that the provision addresses sex discrimination and sex stereotyping.
- Philippines: The Congress of the Philippines passed the Responsible Parenthood and Reproductive Health Act of 2012 which guarantees universal access to contraception, fertility control and maternal care. The bill also mandates the teaching of sexual education in schools.
- Bangladesh: The Drug Administration for Bangladesh legalised the combination of mifepristone and misoprotol for medical abortion.
- Uruguay: Uruguay legalizes abortion on request before twelve weeks of gestation, after a five-day reflection period, making it legally accessible to women.
- Brazil: On 12 April 2012, the Supreme Federal Court ruled by an 8–2 vote to legalize abortion in cases of fetuses with anencephaly, saying that children with anencephaly were biologically alive but that they were not a person, and therefore had no rights.
- Dominican Republic: The Chamber of Deputies approved prison terms for inducing or helping with an abortion. "Abortion will also be punished with from 2 to 3 years and includes women who induce or a person who helps. If a doctor, nurse, midwife, surgeon, pharmacist or other professional helps induce an abortion, the penalty would be from 4 to 10 years."
- France: On Friday, 26 October 2012, the National Assembly of France adopted two amendments to the Social Security Financing Bill for 2013 almost unanimously. This bill extends free contraception to all minors aged 15 to 18. The goal of putting greater free access to contraception in place is to reduce the number of unwanted pregnancies, and thus the number of abortions, in France.
- United States, Mississippi: Mississippi: In 2012, the Mississippi State Legislature passed a law that required abortion clinics to have doctors on staff with hospital admitting privileges.

==== 2013 ====
- Samoa: The Crimes Ordinance 1961 was replaced by the Crimes Act 2013, stating that the following are illegal and the violator is liable to imprisonment for a term not exceeding seven years:
- Procuring abortion by any means (§112)
- Female procuring her own miscarriage (§113)
- Supplying means of procuring abortion (§114)
  - Effectiveness of means used immaterial (§115)

Unless: "[...] in the case of a pregnancy of not more than 20 weeks' gestation, the person doing the act:

- (a) is a registered medical practitioner; and
- (b) believes that the continuance of the pregnancy would result in serious danger (not being danger normally attendant upon childbirth) to the life, or to the physical or mental health, of the woman or girl."
- Australia, Tasmania: In Tasmania, since 21 November 2013, abortions are allowed on request up to 16 weeks of pregnancy. After 16 weeks abortion requires the consent of two doctors on medical or psychological grounds. The law also prohibits filming, the holding of protests, harassment or intimidation of patients or staff within 150 metres of abortion clinics.
- South Korea: South Korea outlawed marital rape.
- China: The first woman to bring a gender discrimination lawsuit in China, a 23-year-old who went by the pseudonym of Cao Ju, won a small settlement of 30,000 yuan and an official apology from the Juren Academy.
- Switzerland: equality between husband and wife with regard to the choice of family name and citizenship law.
- India: In May 2013, the Supreme Court of India held that the two-finger test on a rape victim violates her right to privacy, and asked the Delhi government to provide better medical procedures to confirm sexual assault.
- Samoa: Samoa outlawed marital rape.
- Bolivia: Bolivia outlawed marital rape.
- India: Sexual Harassment of Women at Workplace (Prevention, Prohibition and Redressal) Act, 2013 was passed.
- India: The Criminal Law (Amendment) Act, 2013 was passed.
- Panama: enacts Law 82 – Typifying Femicide and Violence Against Women (Ley 82 – Tipifica el Femicidio y la Violencia contra las Mujeres).
- Swaziland: marital power is restricted, but not abolished: Sihlongonyane v Sihlongonyane (470/2013) [2013] SZHC 144 (18 July 2013).
- Ivory Coast: legal reforms provide for gender equality in marriage.
- Bolivia: enacts Law 348 – Integral law guaranteeing women a Life Free of Violence (Ley 348 – Ley Integral para Garantizar a las Mujeres una Vida Libre de Violencia).
- United States: On 7 March 2013, President Barack Obama signed the Violence Against Women Reauthorization Act of 2013. The renewed act expanded federal protections to gays, lesbians and transgender individuals, Native Americans and immigrants.
- United States: University of Texas Southwestern Medical Center v. Nassar, 570 U.S. ___ (2013), was a Supreme Court of the United States case involving the standard of proof required for a retaliation claim under Title VII. The Court held that while Title VII applies a mixed motive discrimination framework to claims of discrimination on the basis of race, color, religion, sex, or national origin (see 42 U.S.C. § 2000e-2), that framework did not apply to claims of retaliation under 42 U.S.C. § 2000e-3. The Court reasoned that based on its decision in Gross v. FBL Financial Services, Inc. and on common law principles of tort law, the plaintiff was required to show that a retaliatory motive was the "but for" cause of the adverse employment action.
- United States: enacts the Transport for Female Genital Mutilation Act, which prohibits knowingly transporting a girl out of the United States for the purpose of undergoing FGM.
- United States: Vance v. Ball State University is a U.S. Supreme Court case regarding who is a "supervisor" for the purposes of harassment lawsuits. The Supreme Court upheld the Seventh Circuit's decision in a 5–4 opinion written by Samuel Alito, rejecting the Equal Employment Opportunity Commission's interpretation of who counts as a supervisor. The case was important because it resolved a dispute between several different circuits. The Supreme Court held that an employee is a "supervisor" for purposes of vicarious liability under Title VII only if he or she is empowered by the employer to take tangible employment actions against the victim.
- United States, Florida: A Florida man successfully forced the Florida Department of Motor Vehicles to accept his decision to take his wife's last name.
- International: The first United Nations Human Rights Council resolution against child, early, and forced marriages was adopted; the resolution recognizes child, early, and forced marriage as involving violations of human rights which "prevents individuals from living their lives free from all forms of violence and that has adverse consequences on the enjoyment of human rights, such as the right to education, [and] the right to the highest attainable standard of health including sexual and reproductive health," and also states that "the elimination of child, early and forced marriage should be considered in the discussion of the post-2015 development agenda."
- International: The U.N. Security Council unanimously passed Resolution 2122, which supported abortion rights for girls and women raped in wars, "noting the need for access to the full range of sexual and reproductive health services, including regarding pregnancies resulting from rape, without discrimination." United Nations Secretary General Ban Ki-moon had recommended to the U.N. Security Council earlier in 2013 (in September) that girls and women raped in war should have access to "services for safe termination of pregnancies resulting from rape, without discrimination and in accordance with international human rights and humanitarian law." In March 2013 Ban Ki-moon had also recommended to the Council that women raped in war have access to abortion services.
- Turkey: Turkey's parliament ended a ban on women lawmakers wearing trousers in its assembly.
- France: An old bylaw requiring women in Paris, France to ask permission from city authorities before "dressing as men", including wearing trousers (with exceptions for those "holding a bicycle handlebar or the reins of a horse") was declared officially revoked by France's Women's Rights Minister, Najat Vallaud-Belkacem. The bylaw was originally intended to prevent women from wearing the pantalons fashionable with Parisian rebels in the French Revolution.
- France: In France, by executive decision since 2011 and by law since 2013, any married person may officially use their spouse's name as a common name by substituting or compounding it to their own. Before this it was common for married women to use their husband's name in everyday life but this had no legal recognition.
- Saudi Arabia: Saudi women were first allowed to ride bicycles, although only around parks and other "recreational areas". They also had to be dressed in full body coverings and be accompanied by a male relative.
- Saudi Arabia: The Saudi government sanctioned sports for girls in private schools for the first time.
- India: India's top court ruled that authorities must regulate the sale of acid. The Supreme Court's ruling on 16 July 2013 came after an incident in which four sisters suffered severe burns after being attacked with acid by two men on a motorbike. Acid which is designed to clean rusted tools is often used in the attacks and can be bought across the counter. But the judges said the buyer of such acids should in future have to provide a photo identity card to any retailer when they make a purchase. The retailers must register the name and address of the buyer.
- Israel: The Religious Judges Law in Israel was amended to say that at least four women must be included in the religious judges' nomination committee, including a female advocate in the religious courts, and that the total number of committee members shall be eleven.
- Israel: In May 2013, after Women of the Wall, led by Anat Hoffman, had engaged in civil disobedience to exercise freedom of religion, a judge ruled that a 2003 Israeli Supreme Court ruling prohibiting women from carrying a Torah or wearing prayer shawls at the Western Wall had been misinterpreted and that Women of the Wall prayer gatherings at the Western Wall should not be deemed illegal.
- Denmark: Until 2013, according to section 227 of the Danish Penal Code, the penalty for rape committed pursuant to section 216 and for other sexual offences (sections 217–226) could be "reduced or remitted if the persons, between whom the sexual intercourse has taken place, have since married each other or registered their partnership."
- Turkey: The hijab was banned in universities and public buildings until late 2013 – this included libraries or government buildings. The ban was first in place during the 1980 military coup, but the law was strengthened in 1997.
- Austria: Since 1 April 2013, marriage does not automatically change a woman's name; therefore a name change can only take place upon legal application. Before that date, the situation was the opposite: a married woman's name was changed to that of her husband, unless she legally applied to opt-out of the default situation.
- United States, Kansas: Kansas lawmakers approved sweeping anti-abortion legislation (HB 2253) on 6 April 2013, that says life begins at fertilization, forbids abortion based on gender and bans Planned Parenthood from providing sex education in schools.
- United States, Washington: Until 2013, Washington State had an exemption preventing a spouse from being prosecuted with third-degree-rape against the other spouse.
- Ireland: The Protection of Life During Pregnancy Act 2013 (Act No.35 of 2013; previously Bill No.66 of 2013) was an Act of the Oireachtas, which, until 2018, defined the circumstances and processes within which abortion in Ireland could be legally performed.
- North Macedonia: The 2013 Law on Termination of Pregnancy (in force 2013–2019).
- United States, Arkansas: A bill banning abortion after twelve weeks was passed on 31 January 2013, by the Arkansas Senate, but vetoed in Arkansas by Governor Mike Beebe, but, on 6 March 2013, his veto was overridden by the Arkansas House of Representatives. A federal judge issued a temporary injunction against the Arkansas law in May 2013, and in March 2014, it was struck down by federal judge Susan Webber Wright, who described the law as unconstitutional.
- United States, Ohio: Ohio passed a Targeted Regulation of Abortion Providers (TRAP) bill containing provisions related to admitting privileges and licensing and requiring clinics to have a transfer agreement with a hospital.
- United States, Ohio: A law was signed in June by Governor John Kasich. It mandates (among other things) that doctors who do not test for heartbeat activity when a patient seeks an abortion, nor tell the patient in writing if there is a heartbeat, nor tell them the statistical likelihood that the fetus could be carried to term, are subject to criminal penalties; specifically, "The doctor's failure to do [these things] would be a first-degree misdemeanor, carrying up to six months in jail, for the first violation and a fourth-degree felony, carrying up to 18 months in jail, for subsequent violations."

==== 2014 ====
- United States, Arkansas: A bill banning abortion after twelve weeks was passed on 31 January 2013, by the Arkansas Senate, but vetoed in Arkansas by Governor Mike Beebe, but, on 6 March 2013, his veto was overridden by the Arkansas House of Representatives. A federal judge issued a temporary injunction against the Arkansas law in May 2013, and in March 2014, it was struck down by federal judge Susan Webber Wright, who described the law as unconstitutional.
- United States: The Board of Immigration Appeals, America's highest immigration court, found for the first time that women who were victims of severe domestic violence in their home countries could be eligible for asylum in the United States. However, this ruling was in the case of a woman from Guatemala and thus applies only to women from Guatemala.
- Israel: The Israeli Cabinet updated the 1977 abortion law in 2014 to decriminalize elective abortions in nearly all cases.
- United States: Amendments were made to the Clery Act to require reporting on domestic violence, dating violence and stalking.
- Tunisia: Adopted the Tunisian Constitution of 2014, which recognizes equality between men and women. Among other things, quotas for women were introduced in Article 16 of the new constitution, which guaranteed equal representation of women in politics.
- Europe: the Council of Europe Convention on preventing and combating violence against women and domestic violence (Istanbul Convention), the first legally binding instrument in Europe in the field of domestic violence and violence against women, which creates obligations on states that choose to ratify it, comes into force in August 2014.
- England and Wales and Scotland: The Anti-social Behaviour, Crime and Policing Act 2014 makes forcing someone to marry (including abroad) a criminal offense. The law came into effect in June 2014 in England and Wales and in October 2014 in Scotland.
- Japan: In a landmark ruling issued 23 October 2014, the Supreme Court of Japan ruled that demotion or other punitive measures based on pregnancy violate the Equal Employment Opportunity Law.
- India: In 2014, an Indian family court in Mumbai ruled that a husband objecting to his wife wearing a kurta and jeans and forcing her to wear a sari amounts to cruelty inflicted by the husband and can be a ground to seek divorce. The wife was thus granted a divorce on the ground of cruelty as defined under section 27(1)(d) of Special Marriage Act, 1954.
- United States: Burwell v. Hobby Lobby, 573 U.S. ___ (2014), is a landmark decision by the United States Supreme Court allowing closely held for-profit corporations to be exempt from a law its owners religiously object to if there is a less restrictive means of furthering the law's interest. It is the first time that the court has recognized a for-profit corporation's claim of religious belief, but it is limited to closely held corporations. (Note: "Closely held" corporations are defined by the Internal Revenue Service as those which a) have more than 50% of the value of their outstanding stock owned (directly or indirectly) by 5 or fewer individuals at any time during the last half of the tax year; and b) are not personal service corporations. By this definition, approximately 90% of U.S. corporations are "closely held", and approximately 52% of the U.S. workforce is employed by "closely held" corporations. See Blake, Aaron (30 June 2014). "A LOT of people could be affected by the Supreme Court's birth control decision – theoretically". The Washington Post.) The decision is an interpretation of the Religious Freedom Restoration Act (RFRA) and does not address whether such corporations are protected by the free-exercise of religion clause of the First Amendment of the Constitution. For such companies, the Court's majority directly struck down the contraceptive mandate, a regulation adopted by the US Department of Health and Human Services (HHS) under the Affordable Care Act (ACA) requiring employers to cover certain contraceptives for their female employees, by a 5–4 vote. The court said that the mandate was not the least restrictive way to ensure access to contraceptive care, noting that a less restrictive alternative was being provided for religious non-profits, until the Court issued an injunction 3 days later, effectively ending said alternative, replacing it with a government-sponsored alternative for any female employees of closely held corporations that do not wish to provide birth control.
- Morocco: Article 475 provided between one- and five-year prison sentence for a perpetrator that abducted or deceived a minor with no resort to violence or threat, or attempted to do so. The Article included a second clause that permitted the withdrawal of a persecution if the perpetrator married the girl or woman. The Parliament abolished the law in 2014 as it was considered to be at odds with the 2011 constitution.
- United States: United States v. Castleman (2014) challenged the application of the Domestic Violence Offender Gun Ban to misdemeanor convictions which did not involve "the use or attempted use of physical force". In a 9–0 decision, the United States Supreme Court held that Castleman's conviction of "misdemeanor domestic assault" did qualify as a "misdemeanor crime of domestic violence" under Tennessee state law. Specifically they held that the "'physical force' requirement is satisfied by the degree of force that supports a common-law battery conviction – namely, offensive touching" – thereby preventing him from possession of firearms.
- United States: McCullen v. Coakley, 573 U.S. ___ (2014), was a United States Supreme Court case. The Court unanimously held that Massachusetts' 35-feet fixed abortion buffer zones, established via amendments to that state's Reproductive Health Care Facilities Act, violated the First Amendment to the U.S. Constitution because it limited free speech too broadly.
- Ecuador: In August 2014, a new criminal code came into force in Ecuador, and it no longer contains any marry-your-rapist laws.
- Portugal: Article 400 of the Portuguese penal code of 1886, which still functioned in post-colonial Mozambique until its replacement on 11 July 2014, stated that rapists who married their victim would not be punished. The law was not applied since independence in 1974. It was repealed in 2014.
- Ireland: The Protection of Life During Pregnancy Act 2013 (Irish: An tAcht um Chosaint na Beatha le linn Toirchis 2013 was signed into law on 30 July by Michael D. Higgins, the President of Ireland; it commenced on 1 January 2014. The Protection of Life During Pregnancy Act 2013 Act No.35 of 2013; previously Bill No.66 of 2013) is an Act of the Oireachtas which defined the circumstances and processes within which abortion in Ireland could be legally performed. The Act gave effect in statutory law to the terms of the Constitution of Ireland as interpreted by the Supreme Court in the 1992 judgment in the X Case. That judgment allowed for abortion where pregnancy endangers a woman's life, including through a risk of suicide.
- Ireland: P.P v. Health Service Executive was a 2014 case in the Irish High Court to rule on whether a pregnant woman (anonymised as "N.P.") who was brain dead ought to be kept on life support until the foetus was viable and could be delivered. In ruling for life support to be switched off, the court held that the woman's right to dignity and her family's wishes could take precedence because the chances of the foetus being born alive were infinitesimal. The court rejected an argument that the Eighth Amendment of the Constitution of Ireland applied only to Irish abortion law and thus ought not to be invoked in a non-abortion case. The ruling also stated "when the mother who dies is bearing an unborn child at the time of her death, the rights of that child, who is living, and whose interests are not necessarily inimical to those just expressed, must prevail over the feelings of grief and respect for a mother who is no longer living." This left open the possibility of an opposite verdict in a hypothetical similar case further into a pregnancy.
- England and Wales: The Slander of Women Act 1891 was repealed for England and Wales on 1 January 2014 by section 14(1) of the Defamation Act 2013.
- Turkey: The ban on wearing hijab in high schools was lifted in 2014.
- Turkey: Since 2014, women in Turkey are allowed to keep their birth names alone for their whole life instead of using their husbands' names. In 2014, the Constitutional Court ruled that prohibiting married women from retaining only maiden names is a violation of their rights. Prior to this case, the Turkish Code of Civil Law Article 187 required a married woman to compulsorily obtain her husband's surname after the marriage; or otherwise, to use her birth name in front of her husband's name by giving a written application to the marriage officer or the civil registry office.
- Romania: The new Penal Code, which came into force in 2014, regulates the procedure of abortion. Article 201 (1) punishes the performing of an abortion when done under any of these following circumstances: (a) outside medical institutions or medical offices authorized for this purpose; (b) by a person who is not a certified physician in the domain of obstetrics and gynecology and free to practice this profession; or (c) if the pregnancy has exceeded fourteen weeks. An exception to the fourteen weeks limit is provided by section (6) of Article 201, which stipulates that performing an abortion is not an offense if done for therapeutic purposes by a certified doctor until twenty-four weeks of pregnancy, and even after the twenty-four weeks limit, if the abortion is needed for therapeutic purposes "in the interest of the mother or the fetus". If the woman did not consent to the abortion; if she was seriously injured by the procedure; or if she dies as a result of it, the penalties are increased – sections (2) and (3) of Article 201. If the acts are done by a doctor, apart from criminal punishment, the doctor is also prohibited from practicing the profession in the future – section (4) of Article 201. Section (7) of Article 201 stipulates that a pregnant woman who provokes her own abortion will not be punished.
- United States, Oregon: Equality of rights under the law shall not be denied or abridged by the state of Oregon or by any political subdivision in this state on account of sex. – Oregon Constitution, Article I, §46.
- India: In 1955 the Bollywood group Cine Costume Make-Up Artist & Hair Dressers' Association (CCMAA) created a rule that did not allow women to obtain memberships as makeup artists. However, in 2014 the Supreme Court of India ruled that this rule was in violation of the Indian constitutional guarantees granted under Article 14 (right to equality), 19(1)(g) (freedom to carry out any profession) and Article 21 (right to liberty).
- United States, Louisiana: In 2014, Louisiana passed a law that appeared to require it to maintain a database of women who had abortions in the state and the type of abortion the woman had.
- United States, Louisiana: Act 620, passed in 2014 in Louisiana, modeled after one passed earlier in Texas, required that any doctor performing abortions also have admittance privileges at an authorized hospital within a 30-mile radius of the abortion clinic, among other new requirements. At the time the law was passed, only one doctor had these privileges, effectively leaving only one legal abortion clinic in the state.

==== 2015 ====
- United States, Tennessee: Tennessee established a required 48 hour waiting period before obtaining an abortion.
- United States, Arizona: Arizona Governor Jan Brewer signed into law in April 2012 abortion restrictions that prohibited the procedure after 20 weeks. The U.S. Ninth Circuit Court of Appeals overturned this law in January 2015, but it remains on the books.
- Norway: On 1 January 2015, the regulation on abortion was changed to say that a fetus is presumed viable at 21 weeks and 6 days, unless there are specific reasons to believe it is not.
- Liechtenstein: Until the Criminal Code was amended in 2015, the exception that made abortion legal in cases of rape only applied if the woman was under 14 years old.
- China: China enacted its first nationwide law prohibiting domestic violence, although it excluded same-sex couples and did not address sexual violence. The law also defined domestic violence for the first time.
- United States, Kansas: Kansas became the first state to ban the dilation and evacuation procedure, a common second-trimester abortion procedure. But the new law was later struck down by the Kansas Court of Appeals in January 2016 without ever having gone into effect.
- Gambia: In 2015, Gambia's president Yahya Jammeh banned FGM.
- Brazil: enacts law against femicide.
- Nicaragua: new Family Code which provides for gender equality comes into force, replacing the old family law which gave the husband authority.
- Nigeria: bans FGM.
- Northern Ireland: The Human Trafficking and Exploitation (Criminal Justice and Support for Victims) Act (Northern Ireland) 2015 criminalizes forced marriage (section 16 – Offence of forced marriage).
- Commonwealth realms: The Succession to the Crown Act 2013 (c. 20) is an Act of the Parliament of the United Kingdom that altered the laws of succession to the British throne in accordance with the 2011 Perth Agreement. The Act replaced male-preference primogeniture with absolute primogeniture for those in the line of succession born after 28 October 2011, which means the eldest child, regardless of sex, precedes any siblings. It came into force on 26 March 2015, at the same time as the other Commonwealth realms implemented the Perth Agreement in their own laws.
- United Kingdom: The first conviction for forced marriage in the United Kingdom occurred in June 2015, with the convicted being a man from Cardiff.
- Canada: In 2015, the Canadian Parliament enacted 2 new criminal offences to address the issue of forced marriage. Forcing a person to marry against their will is now a criminal offence under the Criminal Code, as is assisting or aiding a child marriage, where one of the participants is under age 16.
- Canada: Canada removed its tampon tax in mid-2015.
- United States: The Obama administration issued a new rule stating that a closely held for-profit company that objects to covering contraception in its health plan can write a letter to the Department of Health and Human Services stating its objection, and that the department will then notify a third-party insurer of the company's objection, and the insurer will provide birth control coverage to the company's female employees at no additional cost to the company.
- United States: Ellen Pao v. Kleiner Perkins Caufield & Byers LLC and DOES 1–20 was a lawsuit filed in 2012 in San Francisco County Superior Court under the law of California by executive Ellen Pao for gender discrimination against her employer, Kleiner Perkins Caufield & Byers. Overlapping with a number of condemning studies on the representation of women in venture capital, the case was followed closely by reporters, advocacy groups and Silicon Valley executives. Given the tendency for similar cases to reach settlements out of court, coverage of Pao v. Kleiner Perkins described it as a landmark trial once it began in February 2015. On 27 March 2015 the jury found in favor of Kleiner Perkins on all counts.
- United States: A policy update in 2015 required all Indian Health Services-run pharmacies, clinics, and emergency departments to have Plan B One-Step in stock, to distribute it to any woman (or her representative) who asked for it without a prescription, age verification, registration or any other requirement, to provide orientation training to all staff regarding the medication, to provide unbiased and medically accurate information about emergency contraception, and to make someone available at all times to distribute the pill in case the primary staffer objected to providing it on religious or moral grounds.
- United States: In the U.S. Supreme Court case Texas Dept. of Housing and Community Affairs v. Inclusive Communities Project, Inc., 576 U.S. ___ (2015), the Court held that Congress specifically intended to include disparate impact claims in the Fair Housing Act, but that such claims require a plaintiff to prove it is the defendant's policies that cause a disparity. The Fair Housing Act prohibits discrimination based on sex.
- United States: Young v. United Parcel Service, 575 U.S. ___ (2015), is a United States Supreme Court case that the Court evaluated the requirements for bringing a disparate treatment claim under the Pregnancy Discrimination Act. In a 6–3 decision, the Court held that to bring such a claim, a pregnant employee must show that their employer refused to provide accommodations and that the employer later provided accommodations to other employees with similar restrictions.
- Bulgaria: Until September 2015, under Bulgaria's penal code, a rapist could escape punishment, even in the case of statutory rape, if it was followed by marriage.
- Cameroon: On 12 July 2015, two women dressed in religious garments blew themselves up in Fotokol, killing 13 people. Following the attacks, since 16 July of that year, Cameroon banned the wearing of full-face Islamic veils, including the burqa, in the Far North region. Governor Midjiyawa Bakari of the mainly Muslim region said the measure was to prevent further attacks.
- Gabon: On 15 July 2015, Gabon announced a ban on the wearing of full-face veils in public and places of work. The mainly Christian country said it was prompted to do so because of the attacks in Cameroon (see above).
- Chad: Following a double suicide bombing on 15 June 2015, which killed 33 people in N'Djamena, the Chadian government announced on 17 June 2015, the banning of the wearing of the burqa in its territory for security reasons.
- Congo-Brazzaville: The full-face Islamic veil was banned in May 2015 in public places in Congo-Brazzaville, to "counter terrorism", although there had not been an Islamist attack in the country.
- Japan: Japanese law does not recognize married couples who have different surnames as lawful husband and wife, which means that 96% of married Japanese women take their husband's surname. In 2015, the Japanese Supreme Court upheld the name-change law, ruling that it was not unconstitutional, noting that women could use informally their maiden names, and stating that it was the parliamentarians who should decide on whether to pass new legislation on separate spousal names.
- Colombia: On 6 July 2015 the government of Colombia passed a law that legally defines femicide as a crime with 20 to 50 years of jail time.
- France: Until 2015, the law in France imposed a seven-day "cool-off" period between the patient's first request for an abortion and a written statement confirming her decision (the delay could be reduced to two days if the patient was getting close to 12 weeks). That mandatory waiting period was abolished on 9 April 2015.
- France: * December 2015 : The Health Act law by Marisol Tourraine introduced a 'no questions asked' policy regarding contraceptives and stated emergency contraceptives may be administered by school nurses.
- Singapore: In 1986 mandatory pre-abortion counselling was introduced. This applied to all women who were Singapore citizens or PRs, had two or fewer children, or had passed the Primary School Leaving Examination. This was amended in 2015 to apply to all women.
- United States, California: Based on a report prepared by NARAL Pro-Choice America, which alleged that Crisis Pregnancy Centers (CPCs) were providing misleading and inaccurate information, the California Legislature passed the Reproductive FACT (Freedom, Accountability, Comprehensive Care, and Transparency) Act (AB-755) in October 2015. It required any licensed healthcare facility that provided care services related to pregnancies to post a notice that stated "California has public programs that provide immediate free or low-cost access to comprehensive family planning services (including all FDA-approved methods of contraception), prenatal care, and abortion for eligible women." The law set provisions where this notice was to be posted and established civil fines if facilities did not comply. The act required unlicensed facilities which offered certain pregnancy-related services to post a notice stating: "This facility is not licensed as a medical facility by the State of California and has no licensed medical provider who provides or directly supervises the provision of all of the services, whose primary purpose is providing pregnancy-related services." However, the Supreme Court of the United States found that the law violated the First Amendment in 2018 in National Institute of Family and Life Advocates v. Becerra.

==== 2016 ====
- United States, South Carolina: South Carolina Governor Nikki Haley signed legislation that brought into effect a 20-week abortion ban in 2016.
- United States, New York: The FACT Act of New York state made patients aware of state-sponsored services that are available at crisis pregnancy centers, rather than what crisis pregnancy centers did or did not offer. The law went into effect 1 January 2016.
- Armenia: Sex-selective abortion was explicitly outlawed in 2016. However, even before 2016, sex-selective abortion was implicitly banned, as ever since Armenia's legalization of abortion in 1955 under Soviet law, it has always restricted abortion after the first trimester, when sex-selective abortions happen. The only thing that has changed several times throughout the years is the reasons laid down by the government in order for an abortion after 12 weeks to be approved. Since sex-selection was never an approved legal reason, such abortions were always technically illegal. As such, the 2016 law explicitly banning an abortion for reasons of sex-selection was seen as redundant and unenforceable, and it came with a major controversy: the requirement of a three-day waiting period.
- Australia, Australian Capital Territory: Since March 2016, it has been an offence to protest within 50 m of an abortion clinic within the Australian Capital Territory (otherwise called "protest free zones").
- Quezon City in the Philippines: This city implemented an ordinance against street harassment, such as cat-calling and wolf-whistling, on 16 May 2016. Penalties for acts of street harassment were set at fines of Php 1,000 to Php 5,000 and a 1-month jail term.
- Jordan: Article 308 in the Jordanian Penal Code originally allowed for an aggressor of sexual assault to avoid persecution and punishment if he married the victim. Only if the marriage lasted under three years did he need to serve his time. The article was amended in 2016, barring full pardon in cases of rape but keeping a loophole clause that pardoned perpetrators if they married the victim if she was aged between 15 and 18 and if the assault was regarded as "consensual". The article was fully abolished in 2017.
- Algeria: An Algerian law came into effect punishing violence against women and sexual harassment.
- Australia: Hizb ut-Tahrir was ordered to stop forcibly segregating men and women at its public events after a NSW tribunal found the practice constituted sexual discrimination.
- Saudi Arabia: According to a directorate issued by the justice minister, Walid al-Samaani, clerics who register marriage contracts would have to hand a copy to the bride "to ensure her awareness of her rights and the terms of the contract".
- United States: Zubik v. Burwell was a case before the United States Supreme Court on whether religious institutions other than churches should be exempt from the contraceptive mandate, a regulation adopted by the US Department of Health and Human Services (HHS) under the Affordable Care Act (ACA) that requires non-church employers to cover certain contraceptives for their female employees. Churches are already exempt under those regulations. On 16 May 2016, the U.S. Supreme Court issued a per curiam ruling in Zubik v. Burwell that vacated the decisions of the Circuit Courts of Appeals and remanded the case "to the respective United States Courts of Appeals for the Third, Fifth, Tenth, and D.C. Circuits" for reconsideration in light of the "positions asserted by the parties in their supplemental briefs". Because the Petitioners agreed that "their religious exercise is not infringed where they 'need to do nothing more than contract for a plan that does not include coverage for some or all forms of contraception", the Court held that the parties should be given an opportunity to clarify and refine how this approach would work in practice and to "resolve any outstanding issues". The Supreme Court expressed "no view on the merits of the cases." In a concurring opinion, Justice Sotomeyer, joined by Justice Ginsburg noted that in earlier cases "some lower courts have ignored those instructions" and cautioned lower courts not to read any signals in the Supreme Court's actions in this case.
- United States: Voisine v. United States, 579 U.S. ___ (2016), was a United States Supreme Court case in which the Court held that reckless misdemeanor domestic violence convictions trigger gun control prohibitions on gun ownership.
- United States: Whole Woman's Health v. Hellerstedt, 579 U.S. ___ (2016), was a United States Supreme Court case decided on 27 June 2016, when the Court ruled 5–3 that Texas cannot place restrictions on the delivery of abortion services that create an undue burden for women seeking an abortion. It has been called the most significant abortion rights case before the Supreme Court since Planned Parenthood v. Casey in 1992.
- United States: The Survivors' Bill of Rights Act of 2016 was passed by the United States Congress in September 2016 and signed into law by US President Barack Obama on 7 October 2016. The law overhauls the way that rape kits are processed within the United States and creates a bill of rights for victims. Through the law, survivors of sexual assault are given the right to have a rape kit preserved for the length of the case's statute of limitations, to be notified of an evidence kit's destruction, and to be informed about results of forensic exams.
- United States: The Obama administration issued guidance that informed states that ending Medicaid funding for Planned Parenthood or other health-care providers that performed abortions might be against federal law. The Obama administration contended that Medicaid law permitted states to ban providers from the program only if the providers could not perform covered services or bill for those services. However, the Trump administration repealed this guidance in 2018.
- Germany: Germany's parliament passed a new law saying that it is rape to have sex with a person who says "No" to the sex. Under the previous law, sex was not considered rape unless the victim fought back. The new law also classifies groping as a sex crime, makes it easier to deport migrants who commit sex offences, and makes it easier to prosecute assaults committed by a large group.
- Tanzania: The Tanzanian High Court—in a case filed by the Msichana Initiative, a lobbying group that advocates for girls' right to education—ruled in favor of protecting girls from the harms of early marriage.
- Gambia: During a feast ending the Muslim holy month of Ramadan, the Gambian President Yahya Jammeh announced that child and forced marriages were banned.
- Pakistan: Pakistan repealed the loophole which allowed the perpetrators of honor killings to avoid punishment by seeking forgiveness for the crime from another family member, and thus being legally pardoned.
- Punjab: Protection of Women against Violence Bill, 2015 is a bill drafted by CM's Special Monitoring Unit (Law and Order) and passed by the Provincial Assembly of the Punjab which was signed into a law on 1 March 2016 by Malik Muhammad Rafique Rajwana. The law declares physical violence, abusive language, stalking, cyber crimes, sexual violence, psychological and emotional abuse against women a crime in Punjab, home to 60% of Pakistan's population. Additionally, it creates a toll-free universal access number (UAN) to receive complaints while district protection committees will be established to investigate complaints filed by women. Centres will also be set up for reconciliation and resolution of disputes. Every district would have women's shelters and district-level panels to investigate reports of abuse and mandates the use of GPS bracelets to keep track of offenders

The bill aims to promote gender equality in the province, it allows women to get a residence order, the victim has a right to stay in the house if she does not want to vacate it or the defendant has to provide an alternative accommodation to the victim if she wants so. Further, if she is being harassed or stalked, she can claim a protection order which ordains the defendant to not communicate with her or stay a certain distance from her. In addition, the victim can also seek monetary relief from the defendant to meet expenses occurred and losses suffered through monetary orders in this bill.

- Israel: It was announced that the High Court of Justice had given the Justice Ministry 30 days to formulate new regulations to allow women to compete equally with men for the position of director of rabbinical courts.
- Israel: The Tel Aviv Rabbinical Court ordered a man jailed for thirty days for helping his son refuse to give his daughter-in-law a divorce for eleven years.
- Malaysia: The Sessions Court declared that a man accused of two counts of statutory rape of a 14-year-old girl from Petra Jaya in the Malaysian part of Borneo in October 2015 would escape punishment because he claimed to have married his victim, but this was overruled by the High Court in Sabah and Sarawak in August 2016 after large-scale protests argued this would set a dangerous precedent for child rapists to escape punishment.
- Bulgaria: A ban on the wearing of face-covering Islamic clothing in public was adopted by the Bulgarian parliament.
- Latvia: A ban on the wearing of face-covering Islamic clothing in public was adopted by the Latvian parliament, despite such garments being rarely worn in Latvia.
- Ireland: Mellet v Ireland is a finding from the United Nations Human Rights Committee in 2016 that the Republic of Ireland's abortion laws violated human rights and the International Covenant on Civil and Political Rights by banning abortion in cases of fatal foetal abnormality and by forcing her to travel to the United Kingdom for an abortion.
- Galdakao, Spain: Due to the widespread practice of topless sunbathing, the municipality of Galdakao decided to legalize female toplessness on their public pools (in March 2016).
- Brazil: On 29 November 2016, the Supreme Court in Brazil ruled in a non-binding decision that "abortion should not be a crime when performed in the first three months of pregnancy". This ruling was controversial, due to the fact that the Brazilian government had passed a bill earlier in 2016 which aimed to make Brazilian law on abortion even stricter.
- United States, Alabama: A 2016 Alabama law banned dilation & evacuation (D&E)—the most common abortion procedure used in the second trimester. In August 2018, the Eleventh Circuit ruled the D&E legislation to be unconstitutional, blocking it from being enforced.

==== 2017 ====
- United States, California: In 2011, the trustees of Deep Springs College voted to begin accepting female students in the summer of 2013 but became embroiled in legal challenges which were lodged against the trustees' action. The challengers disputed the authority of the college's board to change the admissions policy and included an injunction preventing the college from accepting female students until at least the 2018–2019 academic year. On April 13, 2017, the California Court of Appeal ruled that the college could admit women in Hitz v. Hoekstra.
- United States, Wyoming: A law passed by the Wyoming state legislature went into effect that prohibited the sale of fetal tissue.
- United States, Wyoming: A law went into effect in Wyoming that required abortion service providers to give women seeking abortions an ultrasound, but it had no enforcement component.
- United States, Illinois: In 2017, the 100th Illinois General Assembly repealed the trigger law component of the Illinois Abortion Law of 1975, but left many of its other provisions intact. In the same act, the General Assembly provided for abortion to be covered under Medicaid and state employee health insurance. The bill was signed into law by pro-choice Republican governor Bruce Rauner.
- Australia, Northern Territory: The Termination of Pregnancy Law Reform Act was enacted on 1 July 2017 and removed the need for two doctors to examine a woman before 14 weeks gestation, implemented a 150-metre "safe access zone" around clinics, removed the requirement of parental approval for the procedure and provided the ability for the prescription of medical abortion tablets.
- Chile: Abortion in Chile is legal in the following cases: when the woman's life is deemed to be at severe risk, when the fetus will not survive the pregnancy, and during the first 12 weeks of pregnancy (14 weeks, if the woman is under 14 years old) in the case of rape. The bill permitting abortion in these cases was approved by the National Congress in August 2017, and became law a month later after surviving a constitutional challenge brought by the conservative opposition.
- United States: The "Mexico City Policy" was reinstated by President Trump. Trump not only reinstated the policy but expanded it, making it cover all global health organizations that receive U.S. government funding, rather than only family planning organizations that do, as was previously the case.
- United States: A new law ended former President Obama's executive order, which would have mandated companies trying to get contracts with the federal government to show compliance with federal anti-discrimination laws. That executive order had been enjoined by a federal judge in October 2016.
- United States: In 2017 a rule about abortions was overturned by new legislation. Late in 2016, the Obama administration issued the rule, effective in January 2017, banning U.S. states from withholding federal family-planning funds from health clinics that give abortions, including Planned Parenthood affiliates; this rule mandates that local and state governments give federal funds for services related to sexually transmitted infections, pregnancy care, fertility, contraception, and breast and cervical cancer screening to qualified health providers whether or not they give abortions. However, this rule was blocked by a federal judge the day before it would have taken effect.
- United States: The 9th U.S. Circuit Court of Appeals ruled that employers could pay women less than men for the same work if they based that on differences in the workers' previous salaries.
- United States: The Trump administration issued a ruling letting insurers and employers refuse to provide birth control if doing so went against their "religious beliefs" or "moral convictions".
- United States: Federal judge Wendy Beetlestone issued an injunction temporarily stopping the enforcement of the Trump administration ruling letting insurers and employers refuse to provide birth control if doing so went against their "religious beliefs" or "moral convictions".
- United States, Delaware: The state legislature updated Delaware's legal code in 2017 around abortion. It now read, "the termination of a pregnancy prior to viability, to protect the life or health of the mother, or in the event of serious fetal anomaly."
- Sweden: Maria Teresa Rivera became the first woman in the world granted asylum because of being wrongly jailed for disregarding a ban on abortion. She disregarded the ban in El Salvador and was given asylum in Sweden.
- Israel: The Jerusalem Magistrates Court ruled that employees of airlines could not request female passengers change their seats just because men wish them to.
- Europe: The European Court of Human Rights ruled in favor of Maria Ivone Carvalho Pinto de Sousa Morais, who had had an operation that was mishandled and rendered her unable to have sex. Portuguese judges had previously reduced damages to her in 2014, ruling then that the operation, which occurred when she was 50, had happened at "an age when sex is not as important as in younger years". The European Court of Human Rights rejected that decision, with the majority's ruling stating in part, "The question at issue here is not considerations of age or sex as such, but rather the assumption that sexuality is not as important for a 50-year-old woman and mother of two children as for someone of a younger age. That assumption reflects a traditional idea of female sexuality as being essentially linked to childbearing purposes and thus ignores its physical and psychological relevance for the self-fulfillment of women as people."
- Tunisia: A law was passed that, among other things, declared that men who had sex with underage girls would not be able to avoid being prosecuted by marrying those girls, changed the age of consent from 13 to 16, criminalized marital rape and sexual harassment, and made wage and work discrimination against women punishable by a fine of 2,000 Tunisian dinars ($817).
- Tunisia: Tunisia removed a law (in place since 1973) which forbade Muslim women from marrying non-Muslims.
- Nepal: Nepal passed a law punishing people who force women into exile during menstruating with up to three months in jail or a fine of 3,000 Nepalese rupees.
- India: On 22 August 2017, the Indian Supreme Court deemed instant triple talaq (talaq-e-biddat) unconstitutional.
- Saudi Arabia: On 26 September 2017, King Salman issued an order to allow women to drive in Saudi Arabia, with new guidelines to be created and implemented by the following June.
- The Philippines: The Philippines forbid companies from mandating that female employees have to wear high heels at work.
- Canada: The Canadian province of British Columbia amended workplace legislation to prevent employers from requiring women to wear high heels at work. British Columbia premier Christy Clark stated that the government was "changing this regulation to stop this unsafe and discriminatory practice."
- El Salvador: A law made in 1994 known as Article 14, stated that as a general rule, persons under eighteen years of age can not marry, but established in the second paragraph, that exceptionally they can contract marriage if they are pubescent, they already have a child in common, or if the woman is pregnant. This law was abolished in 2017.
- Lebanon: Article 522 of the Lebanon Penal Code became a part of the law in the 1940s and stated that rape was a punishable offense, where the attacker could receive up to seven years in prison. However, no criminal prosecution would take place if the perpetrator and their victim got married, and stayed married for a minimum of three years. In 2017, Article 522 of the Lebanon Penal Code, which had been labelled a "rape law" was repealed. But after Article 522 was repealed, it was argued by many that the law still lived on through Articles 505 and 518. Article 505 involves the act of sex with a minor, while Article 518 deals with the seduction of a minor accompanied by the promise of marriage.
- Jordan: Article 308 in the Jordanian Penal Code was abolished in 2017. The article originally allowed for an aggressor of sexual assault to avoid persecution and punishment if he married the victim. Only if the marriage lasted under three years did he need to serve his time. The article was amended in 2016, barring full pardon in cases of rape but keeping a loophole clause that pardoned perpetrators if they married the victim if she was aged between 15 and 18 and if the assault was regarded as "consensual".
- Puntland: The self-declared autonomous region of Puntland adopted a Sexual Offences Act in 2017, that criminalized all forms of sexual violence against women.
- Austria: A legal ban on face-covering Islamic clothing was adopted by the Austrian parliament.
- Germany: A ban on face-covering clothing for soldiers and state workers during work was approved by German parliament.
- Morocco: Morocco banned the manufacturing, marketing and sale of the burqa.
- Tajikistan: Tajikistan passed a law requiring people to "stick to traditional national clothes and culture", which has been widely seen as an attempt to prevent women from wearing Islamic clothing, in particular the style of headscarf wrapped under the chin, in contrast to the traditional Tajik headscarf tied behind the head.
- China: China banned the burqa in the Islamic area of Xinjiang.
- Quebec: The Quebec ban on face covering (known officially as "An act to foster adherence to State religious neutrality and, in particular, to provide a framework for requests for accommodations on religious grounds in certain bodies") made world headlines in October 2017. The ban was instituted on 18 October 2017. The ban prevents anyone whose face is covered from delivering or receiving a public service. According to an article in The Economist by a left leaning journalist, the law's "real purpose is to ban Muslim women from wearing niqabs, or face veils, when they provide or receive public services". Others feel that the aim of the law is to counter growing use of religious symbolism by Muslim women in Quebec.
- United States: In January 2017, the New Jersey Superior Court, Appellate Division in Camden County dismissed two suits filed by Linda Tisby in summer 2015 against her former employer, the county's Department of Corrections. The court decided that a New Jersey Superior Court was right to rule that it would have been an "undue hardship" for the agency to accommodate her religious beliefs concerning wearing a headscarf "because of overriding safety concerns, the potential for concealment of contraband, and the importance of uniform neutrality".
- India: The Maternity (Amendment) Bill 2017, an amendment to the Maternity Benefit Act, 1961, was passed; it protects the employment of women during the time of her maternity and entitles her to a 'maternity benefit' – i.e. full paid absence from work – to take care for her child. The act is applicable to all establishments employing 10 or more persons. As per the Act, to be eligible for maternity benefit, a woman must have been working as an employee in an establishment for a period of at least 80 days in the past 12 months. Payment during the leave period is based on the average daily wage for the period of actual absence.
- Russia: Vladimir Putin signed a law which decriminalizes a first offense of domestic violence which does not seriously injure the person, making that offense a less serious administrative offense in Russia.
- Poland: In Poland, a new law restricted emergency contraception by making it a prescription drug.
- Chad: In 2016 the National Assembly of Chad passed an updated penal code decriminalising abortion under limited circumstances. Article 358 of that code states that abortion is allowed in case of sexual assault, rape, incest or when the pregnancy endangers the mental or physical health or the life of the mother or the fetus. On 8 May 2017, the new penal code was enacted by the President Idriss Deby. It became law on 1 August 2017.
- United States, Oregon: The Reproductive Health Equity Act was passed in 2017, which required health insurance in Oregon to offer abortion coverage and to absorb most of the costs for the procedure, instead of passing them along to women.

==== 2018 ====
- United States, Arizona: The Arizona state legislature passed a law that required the Arizona Health Department to apply for Title X funds as part of their attempts to defund Planned Parenthood.
- Iran: On 23 February 2018, Iranian Police released an official statement saying that any women found protesting Iran's compulsory veiling code would be charged with "inciting corruption and prostitution", which carries a maximum sentence of 10 years in prison. Before this change, according to article 638 of the Islamic Penal Code of the Islamic Republic of Iran, "Anyone in public places and roads who openly commits a harām (sinful) act, in addition to the punishment provided for the act, shall be sentenced to two months imprisonment or up to 74 lashes; and if they commit an act that is not punishable but violates public prudency, they shall only be sentenced to ten days to two months' imprisonment or up to 74 lashes. Note- Women who appear in public places and roads without wearing an Islamic hijab, shall be sentenced to ten days to two months' imprisonment or a fine of fifty thousand to five hundred Rials." After this change, any woman found without an islamic veil in a public space is charged according to article 639 of the Islamic Penal Code of the Islamic Republic of Iran, which states: "The following individuals shall be sentenced to one year to ten years imprisonment and in respect to paragraph (A), in addition to the punishment provided, the relevant place shall be closed temporarily at the discretion of the court. A – Anyone who establishes or directs a place of immorality or prostitution. B – Anyone facilitates or encourages people to immorality or prostitution."
- Cyprus: Abortion in Cyprus was fully legalized in March 2018. It can be performed on request up until the 12th week of pregnancy and until the 19th week in rape cases. It was previously performed only if there was deemed to be a severe risk of physical or mental harm to the woman, a risk of fetal deformity, or if the patient was raped or otherwise sexually assaulted.
- United States, District of Columbia: In April and June 2018, Ketanji Brown Jackson of the United States District Court for the District of Columbia presided over two cases challenging the Department of Health and Human Services' decision to terminate grants for teen pregnancy prevention programs two years early. Jackson ruled that the decision to terminate the grants early, without any explanation for doing so, was arbitrary and capricious.
- United States, Iowa: On 4 May 2018, governor Kim Reynolds signed into law a bill that would ban abortion in Iowa after heartbeat activity after six weeks is detected, starting 1 July 2018. On 22 January 2019, a county district judge declared the law to be in violation of Iowa's State Constitution and entered a permanent injunction prohibiting its enforcement.
- L'Ametlla del Vallès, Spain: Due to the widespread practice of topless sunbathing, the municipality of L'Ametlla del Vallès decided to legalize female toplessness in their public pools (in June 2018).
- New South Wales, Australia: Since 1 July 2018, it has been illegal to protest within 150 metres of an abortion service.
- Queensland, Australia: Since 3 December 2018, abortion in Queensland has been available on request during the first 22 weeks of gestation. After that period, two doctors must sign off on the procedure before a woman can access an abortion unless there is deemed to be a severe danger to the life of the woman or, in a multiple pregnancy, another unborn child.
- China, Jiangxi: In 2018, Jiangxi province issued guidelines stipulating that women more than 14 weeks pregnant must have signed approval from three medical professionals confirming an abortion is medically necessary before any procedure.
- Iceland: Legislation came into effect requiring government agencies and companies with more than 25 employees to get government certification for their equal-pay policies regarding gender, with fines for those that do not show pay equality.
- United States: The Trump administration repealed guidance issued in 2016 by the Obama administration, which had informed states that ending Medicaid funding for Planned Parenthood or other health-care providers that performed abortions might be against federal law. The Obama administration had contended that Medicaid law permitted states to ban providers from the program only if the providers could not perform covered services or bill for those services.
- Sweden: Sweden passed a law defining sex without consent in clear body language or words as rape, even if no force or threats are used; previously a rape conviction had required proof that the offender used force or that the victim was in a vulnerable state.
- Denmark: Denmark's parliament voted 75–30 to ban garments that cover the face, which includes Islamic veils such as the niqāb and burqa. Those violating the law risk a fine of 1,000 kroner.
- Ireland: The Eighth Amendment of the Constitution of Ireland, which recognized "the unborn" as having a right to life equal to that of "the mother", was repealed by referendum.
- Ireland: The Health (Regulation of Termination of Pregnancy) Act 2018 (Act No. 31 of 2018; previously Bill No. 105 of 2018) is an Act of the Oireachtas (Irish parliament) which defines the circumstances and processes within which abortion may be legally performed in Ireland. It permits termination under medical supervision, generally up to 12 weeks' gestation, and later if pregnancy poses a serious health risk or there is a fatal foetal abnormality.
- United States: National Institute of Family and Life Advocates v. Becerra was a case before the Supreme Court of the United States addressing the constitutionality of California's FACT Act, which mandated that crisis pregnancy centers provide certain disclosures about state services. The centers, typically run by Christian non-profit groups, challenged the act on the basis that it violated their free speech. After prior reviews in lower courts, the case was brought to the Supreme Court, asking "Whether the disclosures required by the California Reproductive FACT Act violate the protections set forth in the free speech clause of the First Amendment, applicable to the states through the 14th Amendment." The Court ruled on 26 June 2018 in a 5–4 decision that the notices required by the FACT Act violate the First Amendment by targeting speakers rather than speech.
- Israel: The Knesset passed a law, slated to remain in effect for three years, allowing Israel's rabbinical courts to handle certain cases of Jewish women wishing to divorce their Jewish husbands, even if neither the wife nor the husband is an Israeli citizen.
- Morocco: A law known as the Hakkaoui law, named after its drafter Bassima Hakkaoui, went into effect; it includes a ban on forced marriage and sexual harassment in public places, and harsher penalties for certain forms of violence. It was criticized however for requiring victims to file for criminal prosecution to get protection.
- France: France outlawed street sexual harassment, passing a law declaring catcalling on streets and public transportation is subject to fines of up to €750, with more for more aggressive and physical behavior. The law also declared that sex between an adult and a person of 15 or under can be considered rape if the younger person is judged incompetent to give consent. It also gives underage victims of rape an extra decade to file complaints, extending the deadline to 30 years from their turning 18.
- India: The Supreme Court of India struck down a law making it a crime for a man to have sex with a married woman without the permission of her husband.
- India: In 1991, the Kerala High Court restricted entry of women above the age of 10 and below the age of 50 from Sabarimala Shrine as they were of the menstruating age. However, on 28 September 2018, the Supreme Court of India lifted the ban on the entry of women. It said that discrimination against women on any grounds, even religious, is unconstitutional.
- India: India eliminated a controversial 12% tax on feminine hygiene products in 2018.
- India: Prior to November 2018, women were forbidden to climb Agasthyarkoodam. A court ruling removed the prohibition.
- United States, California: A law was signed making California the first state in America to require women to be included on companies' boards of directors. The law requires all publicly traded California companies to have at least one woman on their boards by the end of 2019, and in 2021 requires five-member boards to have two female members, and boards with six or more members to have three.
- United States: The Stop Enabling Sex Traffickers Act (SESTA) and Allow States and Victims to Fight Online Sex Trafficking Act (FOSTA) are the U.S. Senate and House bills that as the FOSTA-SESTA package became law on 11 April 2018. They clarify the country's sex trafficking law to make it illegal to knowingly assist, facilitate, or support sex trafficking, and amend the Section 230 safe harbors of the Communications Decency Act (which make online services immune from civil liability for the actions of their users) to exclude enforcement of federal or state sex trafficking laws from its immunity.
- United States: On 20 November 2018, U.S. District Judge Bernard A. Friedman ruled that the federal Female Genital Mutilation Act of 1996 was unconstitutional. The defendants in this case which led to this ruling had argued successfully that the practice does not pertain to the Commerce Clause under which the federal law was passed.
- United States: The FIRST STEP Act became law, and it requires the Federal Bureau of Prisons to make feminine hygiene products "available to prisoners for free, in a quantity that is appropriate to the healthcare needs of each prisoner." It also prohibits the use of restraints on pregnant women, unless the woman "is an immediate and credible flight risk that cannot reasonably be prevented by other means" or "poses an immediate and serious threat of harm to herself or others that cannot reasonably be prevented by other means" or "a healthcare professional responsible for the health and safety of the prisoner determines that the use of restraints is appropriate for the medical safety of the prisoner." For those situations in which restraints are allowed, the legislation mandates the use of the least restrictive restraints necessary. However, it only applies to federal prisons.
- United States, Indiana: The General Assembly shall not grant to any citizen, or class of citizens, privileges or immunities, which, upon the same terms, shall not equally belong to all citizens. – Indiana Constitution, Article 1, §23 (2018).
- United States, Mississippi: District Judge Carlton Reeves blocked a Mississippi law banning abortion at 15 weeks from taking effect.
- United States: The Violence Against Women Act expired on 21 December 2018.
- United States, Alabama: A 2016 Alabama law banned dilation & evacuation (D&E)—the most common abortion procedure used in the second trimester. In August 2018, the Eleventh Circuit ruled the D&E legislation to be unconstitutional, blocking it from being enforced.

==== 2019 ====
- United States, Iowa: On 4 May 2018, governor Kim Reynolds signed into law a bill that would ban abortion in Iowa after a heartbeat after six weeks is detected, starting 1 July 2018. On 22 January 2019, a county district judge declared the law to be in violation of Iowa's State Constitution and entered a permanent injunction prohibiting its enforcement.
- United States, Arizona: On 1 January 2019, a new law came into force in Arizona that required women to provide detailed medical information that was to be submitted to the state before they were allowed to have an abortion. Among the information the new law required abortion providers to collect was whether the abortion was elective or therapeutic, the number of abortions they have had in the past and information on any medical complications they have as a result of the abortion. This information is then collected by Department of Health Services who provide the state with an annual report on abortions in the state, along with information on the how abortions are paid for in the state.
- United States, Kentucky: Prior to 2019, Kentucky law prohibited abortions after week 22. This changed when the state legislature passed a law that moved the prohibition to week 6 in the early part of the year.
- United States, Delaware: Equality of rights under the law shall not be denied or abridged on account of sex. – Delaware Constitution, Article I, §21 (2019).
- Singapore: Marital rape was completely criminalised under the Criminal Law Reform Act passed on 6 May 2019.
- Saudi Arabia: In Saudi Arabia due to guardianship laws many women were not previously aware when their husbands divorced them. This often created confusion and even led to homelessness. In January 2019, the Saudi supreme court issued a law requiring women to receive a text message from the court when officially divorced.
- Saudi Arabia: Saudi Arabia granted women the right to travel without permission from a male guardian, and expanded their marriage and custodial rights in a series of royal decrees.
- Ireland: The Health (Regulation of Termination of Pregnancy) Act 2018 (Act No. 31 of 2018; previously Bill No. 105 of 2018) came into effect; it is an Act of the Oireachtas which defines the circumstances and processes within which abortion may be legally performed in Ireland. It permits terminations to be carried out up to 12 weeks of pregnancy; or where there is a risk to the life, or of serious harm to the health, of the pregnant woman; or where there is a risk to the life, or of serious harm to the health, of the pregnant woman in an emergency; or where there is a condition present which is likely to lead to the death of the foetus either before or within 28 days of birth.
- China: A government directive was released banning employers from posting "men preferred" or "men only" job advertising, and banning companies from asking women seeking jobs about their childbearing and marriage plans or requiring applicants to take pregnancy tests.
- United States: National Coalition for Men v. Selective Service System was a court case decided on 22 February 2019 that declared that the exclusion of female conscription from the male-only draft in the United States was unconstitutional. The case did not specify any action that the government must take.
- South Korea: The government of South Korea criminalized abortion in the 1953 Criminal Code in all circumstances. This South Korean abortion law was amended by the Maternal and Child Health Law of 1973, which permitted a physician to perform an abortion if the pregnant woman or her spouse suffered from certain hereditary or communicable diseases, if the pregnancy resulted from rape or incest, or if continuing the pregnancy would jeopardize the woman's health. Any physician who violated the law was punished by two years' imprisonment. Self-induced abortions were illegal, and punishable by a fine or imprisonment. The Constitutional Court on 11 April 2019 ruled the abortion law unconstitutional and ordered the law's revision by the end of 2020. In October 2020, the government announced draft legislation that would decriminalize abortion until the 14th week of the pregnancy. In addition, abortions between the 14th and 24th week would be permitted if the pregnancy was due to rape or for social, economic, or health reasons. In January 2021, the legislative measures were passed.
- Sri Lanka: The Sri Lankan government banned all types of clothing covering the face, including the burqa and niqab, on 29 April 2019.
- United States, Minnesota: Until July 2019, in Minnesota sexual violence occurring between spouses at the time they cohabit or between unmarried partners could be prosecuted only if there was force or threat of thereof, due to exemptions created by Article 609.349 'Voluntary relationships' which stipulated that certain sexual offenses do not apply to spouses (unless they are separated), and neither do they apply to unmarried cohabitants. These are offenses that deal with situations where the lack of consent is due to the incapacity of consent of the victim, including where the victim was drugged by the perpetrator. These situations, which were excluded from prosecution, are where the victim was "mentally impaired, mentally incapacitated, or physically helpless". The term "mentally incapacitated" is defined as a person who "under the influence of alcohol, a narcotic, anesthetic, or any other substance, administered to that person without the person's agreement, lacks the judgment to give a reasoned consent to sexual contact or sexual penetration". (see Article 609.341 for definitions). In 2019, these exemptions were repealed.
- United States: Box v. Planned Parenthood of Indiana and Kentucky, Inc. (Docket 18-483) was a United States Supreme Court case dealing with the constitutionality of a 2016 anti-abortion law passed in the state of Indiana. Indiana's law sought to ban abortions performed solely on the basis of the fetus' gender, race, ethnicity, or disabilities. Lower courts had blocked enforcement of the law for violating a woman's right to abortion under privacy concerns within the Fourteenth Amendment, as previously found in the landmark cases Roe v. Wade and Planned Parenthood v. Casey. The lower courts also blocked enforcement of another portion of the law that required the disposal of aborted fetuses through burial or cremation. The per curiam decision by the Supreme Court overturned the injunction on the fetal disposal portion of the law, but otherwise did not challenge or confirm the lower courts' ruling on the non-discrimination clauses, leaving these in place.
- United States: In June 2019, the Trump administration was allowed by a federal court of appeals to implement, while legal appeals continue, a policy restricting taxpayer dollars given to family planning facilities through Title X. This policy requires that companies receiving Title X funding must not mention abortion to patients, provide abortion referrals, or share space with abortion providers.
- Isle of Man: From 24 May 2019, it is lawful in the Isle of Man to have an abortion during the first 14 weeks of pregnancy at will, then until the 24th week, so long as criteria specified by the act are met, and then onwards if there is a serious risk of grave injury or death. Abortion is governed by the Abortion Reform Act 2019.
- Tunisia: The Tunisian government banned the niqab, citing security reasons.
- Philippines: Republic Act 11313, known as the Safe Spaces Act, became law in the Philippines; it punishes misogynistic acts, sexist slurs, wolf-whistling, catcalling, intrusive gazing, cursing, and persistent telling of sexual jokes in public or online. Punishments include imprisonment or fines depending on the seriousness of the crime.
- India: The Supreme Court of India granted women officers the legal right to be considered for permanent commissions for a long tenure with the Indian Air Force.
- Bangladesh: Bangladesh's highest court ruled that on marriage registration forms, a word used to describe unmarried women that can also mean "virgin" must be replaced with a word that only means "an unmarried woman".
- Jurisdiction of the 10th Circuit, United States: A federal lawsuit in the 10th Circuit regarding Fort Collins's ordinance against female toplessness was won at the appellate level. In September 2019, after spending over $300,000, Fort Collins decided to stop defending their ordinance against female toplessness and repeal it. That effectively gave females of all ages the right to go topless wherever males can in the jurisdiction of the 10th Circuit (Wyoming, Utah, Colorado, New Mexico, Kansas and Oklahoma states as well as all counties and cities therein).
- United States: A federal judge declared unconstitutional the Trump administration's "conscience rule" that would have allowed providers of health care to refuse to participate in sterilizations, abortions, or other types of care they disagreed with on moral or religious grounds.
- Iceland: In May 2019, the Icelandic parliament decriminalized elective abortion procedures until week 22 of the pregnancy.
- United States, Mississippi: The 5th U.S. Circuit Court of Appeals declared that Mississippi's ban on abortion at 15 weeks was unconstitutional; the Court said U.S. District Judge Carlton Reeves ruled correctly when in 2018 he blocked the Mississippi law banning abortion at 15 weeks from taking effect.
- United States: The Violence Against Women Act, which expired on 21 December 2018, was temporarily reinstated via a short-term spending bill on 25 January 2019, but expired again on 15 February 2019.
- Argentina: In December 2019 the newly elected Argentine government issued a protocol expanding access to abortion in case of rape.
- Russia: The law now lists 100 occupations that are forbidden to women, as they are considered too dangerous to their health, especially reproductive health (until 2019 the figure was 456).
- New South Wales, Australia: Abortion was decriminalised in New South Wales on 2 October 2019 with the royal assent of the Abortion Law Reform Act 2019, passed a week earlier by both houses of the New South Wales parliament. Under the new law, abortions are made available on request during the first 22 weeks of gestation. After that time, two doctors must agree that it is appropriate, based on the woman's current and future physical, psychological and social circumstances. This is similar to laws in other states and territories. However, the medical practitioner performing the abortion has obligation to give appropriate medical care if the abortion results in a live baby being born.
- Philippines: Act 1120 became law, and it extended paid maternity leave from 60 days for normal childbirth or 78 days for a cesarean delivery to up to 105 days for each pregnancy (previously maternity leave was only available for up to four pregnancies.)
- Kenya: Pregnancies that are the result of a rape can be terminated by experts in Kenya, a June 2019 judgment by the Supreme Court ruled.
- North Macedonia: new law was enacted in 2019, overturning the obstacles which made access to abortion difficult under the former law.
- Mexico: The National Supreme Court of Justice ruled on 7 August 2019 that rape victims have the right to receive abortions in public hospitals. Girls younger than 12 need parental permission.
- Mexico, Oaxaca: On 25 September 2019, Oaxaca became the second Mexican state, after Mexico City, to decriminalise abortion up to 12 weeks of pregnancy.
- Mexico, Puebla: In October 2019, Las Comisiones Unidas de Procuración y Administración de Justicia y de Igualdad de Género (The United Commissions for the Procuration and Administration of Justice and Gender Equality) in Puebla voted against decriminalization of abortion, but reduced the penalty for abortion from five years to one year.
- United States, California: On 20 May 2019, the California State Senate passed Senate Bill 24, the College Student Right to Access Act. The Act requires public state universities to offer mifepristone, the abortion pill, to female students at zero cost by 1 January 2023; funding for the program will be paid for through insurance and private grants with $200,000 to each University of California and California State University health clinic for training and equipment. University clinics also have to set aside an additional $200,000 each to set up a student hotline to provide information to women seeking advice and assistance. The bill was approved by both the California State Assembly and California State Senate as amended on 13 September 2019, was enacted by Governor Gavin Newsom on 11 October 2019, and went into effect on 1 January 2020.
- United States, Illinois: Illinois passed bills, known as the Illinois Reproductive Health Act, that provided statutory protections for abortions, and rescinded previous legislation that banned some late-term abortions and a 45-year-old law that had made performing such abortions a criminal offense. The Illinois Reproductive Health Act says that women have the "fundamental right" to access abortion services, and that a "fertilized egg, embryo, or fetus does not have independent rights".
- United States, Indiana: The Indiana Legislature passed a ban of the most common type of second-trimester abortion procedure in the state in April 2019.
- United States, Kansas: In April 2019, the Kansas Supreme Court ruled that the right to abortion is inherent within the state's constitution and bill of rights, such that even if Roe v. Wade was overturned and the federal protection of abortion rights was withdrawn, the right would still be allowed within Kansas, barring a change in the state constitution.
- United States, Mississippi: A heartbeat bill was signed into law by Mississippi Governor Phil Bryant.
- United States, Nevada: The Trust Nevada Women Act, SB 179, was signed into law by Democratic Governor Steve Sisolak. The new law made several changes to existing abortion laws in the state of Nevada, including decriminalizing the performing of abortion procedures, and removing informed consent laws that said doctors needed to tell women of the "emotional implications" in having an abortion and what women should do after the procedure to avoid post-op complications; the latter was changed to require doctors to "describe the nature and consequences of the procedure" of abortion to women getting abortions. The law also meant doctors no longer had to collect data about women getting abortions related to their marital status and age.
- United States, North Carolina: U.S. District Judge William Osteen formally struck down North Carolina's 'life of the mother only' 20-week abortion ban in 2019. His judgement pushed the date of which abortions could be performed to the date of viability, which is later for many women.
- United States, New York: The state passed the Reproductive Health Act (RHA), which repealed a pre-Roe v. Wade provision that banned third-trimester abortions except in cases where the continuation of the pregnancy endangered a pregnant woman's life. The law said: "The legislature finds that comprehensive reproductive health care, including contraception and abortion, is a fundamental component of a woman's health, privacy, and equality." The bill also allowed qualified health practitioners to perform abortions, not just licensed medical doctors.
- United States, Rhode Island: The Reproductive Privacy Act banned Rhode Island from restricting "an individual person from preventing, commencing, continuing, or terminating that individual's pregnancy prior to fetal viability" or after fetal viability "to preserve the health or life" of the pregnant individual. It also forbade state restrictions on contraceptives in Rhode Island, repealed bans on partial-birth abortions in Rhode Island, forbade medical professionals from being charged with felony assault for performing abortions in Rhode Island, and repealed requirements for abortion providers to notify a husband before giving his wife an abortion in Rhode Island.
- United States, Ohio: In 2019, Ohio Governor Mike DeWine signed the Human Rights and Heartbeat Protection Act, which bans abortion in the state after an embryonic cardiac activity is detectable. On 24 June 2022, after the Supreme Court of the United States overturned Roe v. Wade, judge Michael R. Barrett lifted a preliminary injunction that had blocked state officials from enforcing the law against certain abortion providers, allowing the Human Rights and Heartbeat Protection Act to take full effect.
- United States, Utah: The Utah legislature passed a bill limiting abortions after 18 weeks of pregnancy.

=== 2020s ===
==== 2020 ====
- United States, Virginia: Democratic Virginia Governor Ralph Northam signed bills removing regulations that had required abortion seekers to have an ultrasound at least 24 hours before receiving an abortion and to get counseling on alternatives to abortion, removing the requirement that facilities providing more than five abortions each year be designated as hospitals, and allowing nurse practitioners to perform first trimester abortions.
- United States, Oklahoma: In March, Oklahoma Governor Kevin Stitt signed an executive order to limit elective medical procedures, later confirming that all types of abortion services were included, except for those necessary in a medical emergency or to "prevent serious health risks" to the pregnant woman. However, on 6 April, federal judge Charles Barnes Goodwin blocked the executive order, ruling that the state acted in an arbitrary, unreasonable, and oppressive way, which posed an undue burden on abortion access in Oklahoma.
- Tasmania, Australia: The law was changed to allow Tasmanian survivors of sexual assault to speak out publicly about their assaults.
- United States, Massachusetts: After the passage of the ROE Act in 2020, which codified abortion rights in the state of Massachusetts, abortions can be performed after 24 weeks in cases of fetal anomalies and risks to a patient's mental or physical health. The ROE Act also lowered the age patients can have abortions without parental consent from 18 to 16.
- Northern Ireland: The Abortion (Northern Ireland) Regulations 2020 were laid before Parliament on 25 March and took effect on 31 March. The Regulations were replaced by the Abortion (Northern Ireland) (No. 2) Regulations 2020, which were materially the same with minor corrections; these came into force on 14 May.
- Argentina: Abortion was legalized up to fourteen weeks of pregnancy on 30 December, with the Voluntary Interruption of Pregnancy Law.
- New Zealand: The Abortion Legislation Act 2020 is an Act of Parliament in New Zealand that amends the law to decriminalize abortion. Under the act, abortion is available without restrictions to any woman who is not more than 20 weeks pregnant. Women seeking an abortion after 20 weeks have to be assessed by a qualified health professional.
- India: India's Supreme Court ruled that the government must grant permanent commission and command positions to women military officers equally with male officers.
- Sudan: FGM was criminalized in Sudan in 2020. The punishment is a fine and/or prison for three years.
- United States, Idaho: On 24 March, Governor Brad Little of Idaho signed into law S1385, which is a trigger law stating that if and when states are again allowed to ban abortion on their own authority then abortion would be illegal in Idaho except for cases of the life of the mother, rape or incest.
- United States: June Medical Services, LLC v. Russo (formerly June Medical Services, LLC v. Gee) (591 U.S. ___ (2020)) was a U.S. Supreme Court case which ruled that a Louisiana state law placing hospital-admission requirements on abortion clinics doctors, which had mirrored a Texas state law previously found unconstitutional under Whole Woman's Health v. Hellerstedt (579 U.S. ___ (2016)) (WWH), was also unconstitutional.
- United States, Mississippi: A law was enacted in Mississippi banning abortions based on the sex, race, or genetic abnormality of the fetus.
- United States: Our Lady of Guadalupe School v. Morrissey-Berru, 591 U.S. ___ (2020) was a U.S. Supreme Court case involving the ministerial exception of federal employment discrimination laws. (When applied, the exception operates to give religious institutions an affirmative defense when sued for discrimination by employees who qualify as "ministers;" for example, female priests cannot sue the Catholic church to force their hiring.) The case extends from the Supreme Court's prior decision in Hosanna-Tabor Evangelical Lutheran Church & School v. Equal Employment Opportunity Commission which created the ministerial exception based on the Establishment and Free Exercise Clauses of the United States Constitution, asserting that federal discrimination laws cannot be applied to leaders of religious organizations. The case, along with the consolidated St. James School v. Biel (Docket 19-348), both arose from rulings in the United States Court of Appeals for the Ninth Circuit that found that federal discrimination laws do apply to others within a religious organization that serve an important religious function but lack the title or training to be considered a religious leader under Hosanna-Tabor. The religious organization challenged that ruling on the basis of Hosanna-Tabor. The Supreme Court ruled in a 7–2 decision on 8 July 2020, that reversed the Ninth Circuit's ruling, affirming that the principles of Hosanna-Tabor, that a person can be serving an important religious function even if not holding the title or training of a religious leader, satisfied the ministerial exception in employment discrimination.
- United States: The Patient Protection and Affordable Care Act tried to require employers to offer health-insurance plans that paid for contraceptives. The law specifically exempted churches, but not faith-based ministries. Due to that, religious non-profits like Little Sisters of the Poor were fined if they did not comply. On 6 October 2017, Health & Human Services issued a new rule with an updated religious exemption that protected religious non-profits. But federal judge Wendy Beetlestone issued an injunction temporarily stopping the enforcement of that exemption. As well, following the new rule announcement, the state of Pennsylvania sued the federal government to take away the exemption. Pennsylvania asked a judge to order that the Little Sisters of the Poor must comply with the federal mandate or pay tens of millions of dollars in fines. The state alleged that the religious organization violated the Constitution, federal anti-discrimination law, and the Administrative Procedure Act (APA). On 8 July 2020, in Little Sisters of the Poor v. Pennsylvania, the U.S. Supreme Court ruled against that and in favor of Little Sisters of the Poor.
- United States: National Coalition for Men v. Selective Service System was a court case decided on 22 February 2019, whose decision declared that the exclusion of female conscription from the male-only draft in the United States was unconstitutional; the decision did not specify any action that the government must take. However, that decision was appealed and a decision by a three-judge panel of the 5th Circuit Court of Appeals was issued on 13 August 2020, reversing the 2019 decision on the grounds that it amounted to overturning the Supreme Court's precedent, which only the Supreme Court has the authority to do.
- Poland: Poland's constitutional court ruled that abortion due to fetal defects was unconstitutional.
- Louisiana, United States: Louisiana voters passed a measure to amend the state constitution to omit any language implying that a woman has a right to get an abortion or that any abortion that does occur should be funded.
- United States, Tennessee: Tennessee banned abortions because of a prenatal diagnosis of Down syndrome or because of the gender or race of the fetus.
- Scotland: Scotland became the first nation to pass a law (The Period Products (Free Provision) (Scotland) Act) making period products, including tampons and pads, free and available to access in public buildings.
- United States, Michigan: The city of East Lansing, Michigan, made it legal for women to go topless.
- United States, Ohio: A bill was signed into law requiring all aborted fetal tissue to be cremated or buried.
- Thailand: In a decision published on 19 February, the Constitutional Court of Thailand ruled that Thailand's abortion law was unconstitutional.
- United States: Savanna's Act or the #MMIW Act (MMIW meaning Missing and Murdered Indigenous Women) reforms law enforcement and justice protocols appropriate to address missing and murdered Native women, and for other purposes. It was signed into law in 2020 by President Donald Trump.

==== 2021 ====
- United States, South Dakota: South Dakota Governor Kristi Noem signed an executive order requiring in-person medical visits—not merely telehealth appointments—for the prescription of medication abortions.
- United States, New Jersey: In January, New Jersey governor Phil Murphy signed the Freedom of Reproductive Choice Act into law, preserving the legal right to obtain an abortion, fulfilling a reelection campaign promise.
- United States, Illinois: In fall 2021, the Illinois General Assembly passed a bill to repeal the Parental Notice of Abortion Act. Governor Pritzker signed it into law on 17 December.
- Thailand: Following the Constitutional Court of Thailand 's ruling that Thailand's abortion law was unconstitutional, on 17 November 2020 the Government submitted a bill amending two sections of the penal code: under the new Section 305 abortion on request would become legal in the first 12 weeks of pregnancy, while pregnancy termination would always be made available not only in case of rape or when the woman's health deemed to be in severe danger but also in case of serious fetal impairment; under the new Section 301 penalties for later-term abortion would be reduced to no longer than six months of jail and/or a fine no higher than 10,000 baht. The House of Representatives approved the bill in first reading on 23 December and finally passed it in third reading on 20 January 2021, with 276 votes in support, 8 abstentions and 54 votes against. The Senate passed it on 25 January with 166 to 7 votes in favor, completing the Parliament's approval. The bill received the royal assent on 5 February and was announced in the Royal Thai Government Gazette on 6 February, which set its commencement date on the following day.
- India: Medical Termination of Pregnancy Amendment Act, 2021
- India: Medical Termination of Pregnancy Rules, 2021
- Mexico: Between 7 and 9 September, in a unanimous 10 to 0 ruling, the Supreme Court of Justice decriminalised abortion in Coahuila and Sinaloa. Nevertheless, the effects of these rulings are broader as it sets a federal binding precedent: judges cannot sentence people to jail for either having or assisting in induced abortions, even if local legislations have not changed their criminal laws. The Supreme Court also established that local rules granting protections of "life from conception" were invalid and that access to legal abortions is a fundamental right. This historic landmark paves the path for advocates to challenge abortion restrictions in each state.
- San Marino: A referendum for abortion legalization was held on 26 September, and legalized abortion with a 77.30% vote in favor, allowing for the voluntary termination of pregnancy up to the twelfth week of gestation and also thereafter if there is deemed to be a severe danger to the life of the woman, if the fetus has malformations or if the pregnancy is deemed to present a serious risk to the physical or psychological health of the woman.
- Mexico, Baja California: On 29 October, Baja California became the fifth state in Mexico to legalize abortion by request until the 12th week of pregnancy.
- Ecuador: The Constitutional Court of Ecuador decriminalized abortion in all cases of rape.
- Angola: A law came into effect expanding the circumstances under which abortion is legal in Angola to include risk of health, rape and fetal impairments.
- United States, Indiana: A law went into effect in Indiana mandating an ultrasound 18 hours or more before an abortion is performed.
- Britain: The tampon tax was abolished in Britain, meaning there is now a zero rate of VAT applying to women's sanitary products.
- Punjab, Pakistan: Lahore High Court banned the use of virginity tests in cases where women claim they were raped.
- Honduras: Honduras added its abortion ban to its constitution, and set the number of votes required in order to change it at three-quarters of Congress.
- United States: The STOP FGM Act of 2020 was signed into law, and it gives federal authorities the power to prosecute those who carry out or conspire to carry out FGM, as well as increasing the maximum prison sentence from five to ten years. It also requires government agencies to report to Congress about the estimated number of females who are at risk of or have had FGM, and on efforts to prevent FGM.
- United States: The Supreme Court reinstated federal rules mandating anyone having a medication abortion to acquire the pills for it from a medical provider in person.
- United States: President Biden rescinded the Mexico City policy.
- United States, South Carolina: In February, South Carolina passed a law which would outlaw almost all abortions in that state after "a fetal heartbeat" is detected; however, that law was blocked by a judge in March 2021.
- Turkey: On 20 March, Recep Tayyip Erdoğan announced Turkey's withdrawal from the Istanbul Convention with a presidential decree.
- United States, Minnesota: The Minnesota Supreme Court ruled that people who drink alcohol or take drugs of their own free will before being sexually assaulted do not meet the Minnesota legislature's definition of mentally incapacitated.
- United States, Utah: A law went into effect requiring the biological father of a pregnant woman's unborn child to pay 50% of that pregnant woman's out-of-pocket pregnancy-related medical costs.
- Afghanistan: Immediately after the 2021 Taliban offensive, all universities became sex-segregated all over the country of Afghanistan.
- Benin: Benin's Parliament passed a new legal amendment to the Sexual Health and Reproduction (SRH) 2003 Law on Wednesday, 20 October. With the new amendment, abortion is legally permitted "upon the request of the pregnant woman, voluntary termination of pregnancy can be allowed when the pregnancy is likely to aggravate or cause a situation of material, educational, professional or moral distress incompatible with the interest of the woman and/or the unborn child…" in the first 12 weeks of pregnancy.
- Australia, Northern Territory: In December, the Northern Territory eased restrictions on abortions, allowing access between 14 and 24 weeks with the approval of one doctor instead of the previous two required. They also legalised terminations after 24 weeks with the approval of two doctors, removing the previous provision which stated abortions were only legal after 24 weeks to save a woman's life.
- Australia, South Australia: Safe access zones of 150 metres provided around abortion clinics effective since 1 January.
- Australia, South Australia: A bill fully decriminalizing abortion was introduced into the state parliament in October 2020. Under the legislation, abortion can be performed upon request up to 22 weeks and six days gestation. After that period, a medical practitioner can only perform an abortion if they consult with another practitioner and if both are of the view that the procedure is medically appropriate. The reform removed abortion entirely from the criminal code. The Legislative Council passed the bill on 3 December 2020, as did the House of Assembly on 19 February 2021 by 29 votes to 15. As an amendment banning so-called "gender selective abortion" was passed by the Assembly, the amendments were agreed to by the Legislative Council on 2 March and received royal assent on 11 March.
- Australia, Western Australia: Western Australia was the last jurisdiction in Australia not to have safe access zones for abortion clinics. A bill to create safe zones within 150 metres of abortion clinics was passed on 12 August.
- South Korea: In October 2020, the government announced draft legislation that would decriminalize abortion until the 14th week of the pregnancy. In addition, abortions between the 14th and 24th week would be permitted if the pregnancy was due to rape or for social, economic, or health reasons. In January 2021, the legislative measures were passed.
- Lebanon, Ohio, United States: The city passed an ordinance whereby abortion at all stages of pregnancy was outlawed.
- Mason, Ohio, United States: Mason, Ohio banned abortion at all stages in the year, but its ordinance doing so was repealed later that year.
- United States, Michigan: Legislation was signed to exempt all feminine hygiene products from state sales tax in Michigan.

==== 2022 ====
- United States, New Hampshire: On 1 January, a bill passed that required patients receiving abortion care at a health center in New Hampshire to have an ultrasound.
- Colombia: On 21 February, the Constitutional Court of Colombia declared that abortion cannot be a crime under Colombian law, if the abortion takes place within the first 24 weeks of pregnancy.
- Afghanistan: In March, the Taliban abruptly reversed plans to allow girls to resume secondary school education (defined as grade seven and upwards in Afghanistan). With the exception of the current cohort of university students, this decision leaves graduating from sixth grade as the highest level of educational attainment possible for Afghan women. Secondary schools for boys reopened on schedule.
- Mexico, Sinaloa: On 9 March, Sinaloa became the seventh state in Mexico to legalize abortion by request until the 12th week of pregnancy.
- United States: On 15 March, President Joe Biden signed the reauthorization of the Violence Against Women Act into law as part of the Consolidated Appropriations Act of 2022 (H.R. 2471); it is called the Violence Against Women Act Reauthorization Act of 2022. The reauthorization act does not include provisions to close the boyfriend loophole.
- New Zealand: On 16 March, the Contraception, Sterilisation, and Abortion (Safe Areas) Amendment Act 2022 passed into law by a margin of 108 to 12 votes. It received royal assent on 18 March. The Bill creates safe spaces of no more than 150 metres around abortion providers. It also bans obstructing, filming in an intimidating manner, dissuading or protesting against those trying to access abortion services in those zones.
- United States, Colorado: In April, Colorado passed the Reproductive Health Equity Act, which guarantees access to reproductive care and affirms the rights of pregnant women to continue or terminate a pregnancy. The act prohibits public entities from restricting or denying those rights.
- Afghanistan: In May, the Ministry for the Propagation of Virtue and the Prevention of Vice published a decree requiring all women in Afghanistan to wear full-body coverings when in public (either a burqa or an abaya paired with a niqāb, which leaves only the eyes uncovered). The decree said enforcement action including fines, prison time, or termination from government employment would be taken against male "guardians" who fail to ensure their female relatives abide by the law. In an interview with Christiane Amanpour, First Deputy Leader Sirajuddin Haqqani claimed the decree is only advisory and no form of hijab is compulsory in Afghanistan, though this contradicts the reality.
- Mexico, Guerrero: On 17 May, Guerrero became the eighth state in Mexico to legalize abortion by request until the 12th week of pregnancy.
- United States, Kentucky: On 14 April, House Bill 3 was passed in Kentucky; it banned all abortions in the state after 15 weeks post-conception and introduced a number of regulations and restrictions, including a prohibition on mailing abortion pills, new systems to certify, monitor and publicly name physicians who conduct abortion procedures, "dignified care for the terminated remains of pregnancy loss," and mandatory disclosure of patient information. As the infrastructure was not in place for these new requirements, the two abortion clinics operating in Kentucky had to shut down, making abortion de facto illegal in the state. In response, abortion-rights activists sued the state to challenge the law, with Planned Parenthood and the ACLU stating that the law unconstitutionally bans abortion by introducing requirements that can't be followed or are too arduous to comply with and that it violates patient privacy protections; this led to the law being blocked in federal court later in the year.
- United States, Oklahoma: Oklahoma's abortion ban took effect on 25 May, when Governor Kevin Stitt signed HB 4327 into law, and abortion providers ceased offering services in Oklahoma as of that date. HB 4327 is modeled after the Texas Heartbeat Act and is enforced solely through civil lawsuits brought by private citizens, making it exceedingly difficult for abortion providers to challenge the constitutionality of the statute in court. Oklahoma thus became the first state to ban abortion from the moment of fertilization since Roe v. Wade.
- Italy: The Constitutional Court of Italy ruled against automatically giving Italian children only their father's last name. The court stated that unless the parents agree the child should have one of their surnames, the child should have both, in the order the parents agree on.
- France: The limit for abortion was extended to fourteen weeks of pregnancy in 2022.
- United States, United States Court of Appeals for the Fourth Circuit jurisdiction: The United States Court of Appeals for the Fourth Circuit ruled against the Charter Day School in North Carolina, which had required girls to wear skirts due to the idea that girls are "fragile vessels" deserving "gentle" treatment from boys. The court ruled the requirement was unconstitutional.
- United States, Hawaii: A law was signed requiring the Department of Education to supply free menstrual products to all students on all public school campuses in Hawaii.
- United States, Iowa: On 17 June, the Iowa Supreme Court ruled that the state constitution does not protect the right to an abortion. Justice Edward Mansfield wrote in the majority that "All we hold today is that the Iowa Constitution is not the source of a fundamental right to an abortion necessitating a strict scrutiny standard of review for regulations affecting that right". The court's decision is a reversal of its 2018 ruling, where it found that the constitution protects the right to an abortion.
- United States: Dobbs v. Jackson Women's Health Organization, No. 19-1392, 597 U.S. ___ (2022), is a decision of the United States Supreme Court, in which the Court held that the Constitution of the United States does not confer any right to abortion, thus overruling both Roe v. Wade (1973) and Planned Parenthood v. Casey (1992).
- United States, Kentucky: On 24 June, the 2019 trigger law took effect after the ruling for Dobbs v. Jackson Women's Health Organization was delivered, which overturned Roe v. Wade. It made all abortions illegal except when medically mandatory to prevent the patient from dying or getting a "life-sustaining organ" permanently impaired. Both clinics in the state temporarily stopped providing abortions.
- United States, Utah: According to HB136, which is effective Utah state law from 28 June, abortions are banned following 18 weeks of gestation.
- United States, Kentucky: On 30 June, Jefferson County Circuit Judge Mitch Perry issued a temporary restraining order blocking enforcement of Kentucky's abortion-banning trigger law pending further hearings to determine if the ban violates the Kentucky Constitution. This order temporarily allows both of Kentucky's elective abortion providers, which are both located in Louisville, to temporarily resume elective abortions.
- Spain: The Supreme Court of Spain ruled that height requirements for joining the National Police Corps must take into account the average height for each sex in the Spanish population, disallowing a previous height rule for women.
- United States: President Joe Biden signed Executive Order 14076, which directs the Department of Health and Human Services to expand access to contraceptives, requests the Federal Trade Commission protect patients' reproductive health privacy, and directs the Department of Justice to organize a group of pro bono lawyers to defend women charged with having an abortion.
- United States: The Biden administration issued guidance stating that due to federal law, pharmacies are not allowed to turn away people who have a prescription for a drug that might end a pregnancy.
- Israel: New regulations went into effect, stating that those seeking abortions could send their requests online and would no longer be asked about their use of birth control. As well, under the new regulations, they no longer have to meet with a social worker and may obtain a medication for abortion (if possible) under the oversight of a community health clinic, rather than having to go to hospitals to receive the medication (as they did previously).
- United States, Louisiana: In 2022, a legislative committee passed to the House floor in Louisiana a proposed law that would have potentially criminalized abortion seekers, as well as abortion providers, which was met with vehement opposition by both pro- and anti-abortion advocates and ultimately amended by the full House to remove criminal sanctions for abortion seekers, passed into law and signed by Governor John Bel Edwards (D).
- United States, Maryland: The Abortion Care Access Act was enacted in Maryland; it allows a broader range of healthcare workers — nurse practitioners, nurse midwives, and physician assistants – to perform abortions and allocates $3.5 million to a new program within the Maryland Department of Health to train healthcare workers. Additionally, it requires the majority of health insurance plans, including private health insurance plans, to cover abortions cost free.
- United States, Missouri: On 24 June, following the United States Supreme Court's ruling in Dobbs v. Jackson Women's Health Organization, Missouri Attorney General Eric Schmitt signed a proclamation bringing into effect the state's "trigger law", banning all non-medically necessary abortions.
- United States, Mississippi: A law outlawing abortion in Mississippi took effect on 7 July, after Mississippi State Attorney General Lynn Fitch on 27 June of that year certified the 24 June Supreme Court decision on Dobbs v. Jackson Women's Health Organization.
- United States, Tennessee: Due to the trigger law prohibiting abortion from the point of fertilization which was adopted on 22 April 2019, abortion became illegal from the point of conception in Tennessee on 25 July 2022, 30 days after the overturning of Roe v. Wade.
- United States, Wyoming: Wyoming's legislature passed HB92 in the 2022 legislative session, a trigger law meant to ban abortion soon after the overturn of Roe v. Wade except for cases of rape, incest (reported to law enforcement) and serious risk of death or "substantial and irreversible physical impairments" for the pregnant woman. However, this law was blocked by 9th District Court Judge Melissa Owens the day it took effect (27 July).
- United States, North Dakota: Abortion in North Dakota has been mostly illegal since 28 July when the state's trigger law, following the United States' Supreme Court ruling to overturn Roe v. Wade on 24 June went into effect. The trigger law bans all abortions except to save the life of the mother or in the case of rape or incest, reported to law enforcement.
- Cuba: A referendum on the matter of modifying the Family Code was held in Cuba on 25 September. It succeeded, and among other things the new Family Code includes strict equality of rights between men and women.
- India: A three-judge bench of the Supreme Court of India in Civil Appeal No. 5802 of 2022 made a ruling on 29 September. The ruling defined "woman" as all persons who require access to safe abortion, including cisgender women, trans persons, and other gender-diverse persons. The Court remarked that medical practitioners should refrain from imposing extra-legal conditions on those seeking abortion, such as obtaining the consent of the abortion seeker's family, producing documentary proofs, or judicial authorization, and that only the abortion seeker's consent was material, unless she was a minor or mentally ill. It also stated that "every pregnant woman has the intrinsic right to choose to undergo or not to undergo abortion without any consent or authorization from a third party" and that a woman is the only and "ultimate decision-maker on the question of whether she wants to undergo an abortion." On the topic of the difference between the gestation period considered legal for married and unmarried women—24 weeks for the former and 20 weeks for the latter—the Court ruled that the distinction was discriminatory, artificial, unsustainable and in violation of Article 14 of the Constitution of India, and that "all women are entitled to the benefit of safe and legal abortion." In cases of pregnancies resulting from marital rape, the Court ruled that women can seek an abortion in the term of 20 to 24 weeks under the ambit of "survivors of sexual assault or rape".
- United States, Michigan: A 1931 law criminalized abortion in Michigan except when the mother's life was in danger, and the U.S. Supreme Court ruling in Dobbs v. Jackson Women's Health Organization would have allowed that law to go back into effect, but on September 7, 2022, a Michigan Court of Claims judge ruled that that law violated the Michigan constitution.
- United States, Nevada: Nevada voters voted yes to the ballot question, "Shall the Nevada Constitution be amended by adding a specific guarantee that equality of rights under the law shall not be denied or abridged by this State or any of its cities, counties, or other political subdivisions on account of race, color, creed, sex, sexual orientation, gender identity or expression, age, disability, ancestry, or national origin".
- United States, New Mexico, Hobbs: In the city of Hobbs, New Mexico, a local ordinance was passed in November to prevent abortion clinics from operating.
- United States, Vermont: In November 2022, voters overwhelmingly passed Proposal 5, the Reproductive Liberty Amendment, making Vermont one of the first three states, along with California and Michigan, to amend their constitutions to explicitly include protections for abortion rights.
- United States, California: California voters overwhelmingly passed Proposition 1, which amended the Constitution of California to explicitly protect the right to abortion.
- United States, Michigan: A state constitutional amendment to explicitly guarantee abortion rights was placed on the ballot in 2022 as Michigan Proposal 22–3; it passed by 57 percent, adding the right to abortion and contraceptive use to the Michigan Constitution. The amendment largely prevents the regulation of abortion before fetal viability, unless said regulations are to protect the individual seeking abortion care, and it also makes it unconstitutional to make laws restricting abortions which would protect the life and health, physical and/or mental, of the pregnant individual seeking abortion.
- Afghanistan: Women were banned from gyms, public baths, public parks, and amusement parks.
- Afghanistan: Women were banned from university education.
- Afghanistan: Women were banned from working in non-government organizations (NGOs), and all such organizations were ordered to cease employment of female employees.
- United States, Massachusetts, Nantucket: It became legal for women to be topless at beaches on Nantucket; previously, women could be fined $300 and receive a penalty of up to three years in prison if they did so.
- United States: The Violence Against Women Act was amended, so as to include Native Hawaiian survivors of gender-based violence and Native Hawaiian organizations in Violence Against Women Act grant funding.
- United States: The Pregnant Workers Fairness Act was signed into law.
- United States: The Providing Urgent Maternal Protections for Nursing Mothers Act, also known as the PUMP Act, became law. It mandates that salaried workers who are breastfeeding must have break time and a private space that is not a bathroom. However, employers who do not have 50 or more employees do not have to follow this law if following it would create an undue hardship because of expense or difficulty.
- United States, Michigan: 2022 Michigan Proposal 3 was a ballot proposal that amended the Michigan Constitution to include the right to reproductive freedom, which the measure defined as "the right to make and effectuate decisions about all matters relating to pregnancy, including but not limited to prenatal care, childbirth, postpartum care, contraception, sterilization, abortion care, miscarriage management and infertility care.

==== 2023 ====
- United States, Rhode Island: On 1 January, a law went into effect in Rhode Island mandating equal pay for "comparable work" (defined as work requiring substantially similar skill, effort and responsibility and performed under "similar working conditions") regardless of gender, race, sexual orientation, religion, nationality, age or disability.
- United States, Minnesota: In January 2023, the Minnesota Legislature passed the Protecting Reproductive Options Act, to "explicitly protect and codify abortion rights" within Minnesota law. The Governor of Minnesota signed the bill on January 31, 2023.
- Sierra Leone: In January, the Gender Equality and Women's Empowerment Act (GEWE) was signed into law. It mandates 30% of public and private positions be reserved for women (including in parliament), provides for increased workplace training opportunities for women, allows women fourteen weeks of maternity leave, punishes discrimination against women who seek access to financial services or resources, requires equal pay for women and men working in the same job, and requires yearly reviews of the GEWE's implementation in public and private institutions.
- United States, Michigan: After the Supreme Court overturned Roe v. Wade in 2022, it was unclear whether Michigan's 1931 statute criminalizing abortion procedures and drugs was operative. In April 2023, Governor Gretchen Whitmer signed a bill repealing the 1931 ban, ensuring abortion access in Michigan.
- France: In August 2023, French education minister Gabriel Attal said that abayas would be banned in state schools as they breached the "principle of secularism". On 4 September, the first day of the new academic year, French schools sent 67 girls home for refusing to remove their abayas.

==== 2024 ====
- United States: FDA v. Alliance for Hippocratic Medicine, 602 U.S. 367 (2024), was a United States Supreme Court case to challenge the U.S. Food and Drug Administration (FDA)'s approval of mifepristone, a drug frequently used in medical abortion procedures. The Supreme Court of the United States ruled unanimously on June 13, 2024, that the Alliance for Hippocratic Medicine (AHM) did not have association standing under Article III to bring a case, since neither AHM nor the groups it represented had shown injury. The decision reversed the lower court decisions, restoring mifepristone's availability under current FDA rules.
- United States: Moyle v. United States, 603 U.S. ___ (2024), was a United States Supreme Court case about whether an Idaho abortion law conflicted with the federal Emergency Medical Treatment and Labor Act (EMTALA). The court initially agreed to expedite the appeal and temporarily allowed Idaho to enforce its abortion ban. After hearing the case, the court dismissed it as improvidently granted and restored a lower court order allowing emergency abortions under EMTALA. This returned the case to the lower courts without a ruling on the merits.
- Israel: The High Court of Justice ruled that women are eligible to serve on the Chief Rabbinate Council and as rabbis on the Chief Rabbi Election Assembly.
- Indonesia: Abortion was legalized for up to 14 weeks of pregnancy in Indonesia in cases of medical emergency and rape.
- Afghanistan: The Taliban's supreme leader, Hibatullah Akhundzada, announced that the group was reinstating flogging and death by stoning for women as punishment for adultery, saying, "the Taliban's work did not end with the takeover of Kabul, it has only just begun."
- Afghanistan: The Taliban issued laws banning the transportation of women traveling alone, and women and men who are not related to each other mixing. Also at the same time they issued laws stating women must always veil their bodies in public and that a face covering is necessary and clothing should never be short, thin, or tight. The laws issued then also stated women should veil themselves in front of all male strangers and all non-Muslims, and that women should not be heard reciting, singing, or reading out loud in public, as well as that women are forbidden to look at men they are not related to by blood or marriage and vice versa.
- United States, Arizona: Arizona's abortion ban was repealed through legislation passed by Democratic lawmakers and five Republican lawmakers in the Arizona state legislature, and signed by Arizona Governor Katie Hobbs on May 2, 2024. This repeal of the abortion ban took effect 90 days after the legislative session ended, on September 14, 2024.
- Australia, Tasmania: On September 27, 2024, a Tasmanian Supreme Court Justice found that it was legal for men to be banned from the “Ladies Lounge” art exhibit, because it is legal to discriminate if doing so promotes “equal opportunity” for a marginalised group.
- European Court of Justice jurisdiction: The European Court of Justice ruled gender and nationality were enough for a country to provide asylum to women from Afghanistan.

== See also ==
- Legal rights of women in history
- List of women's rights conventions in the United States
- Timeline of reproductive rights legislation
- Timeline of women's legal rights in the United States (other than voting)
