= Jamaica High School =

Public school in New York City

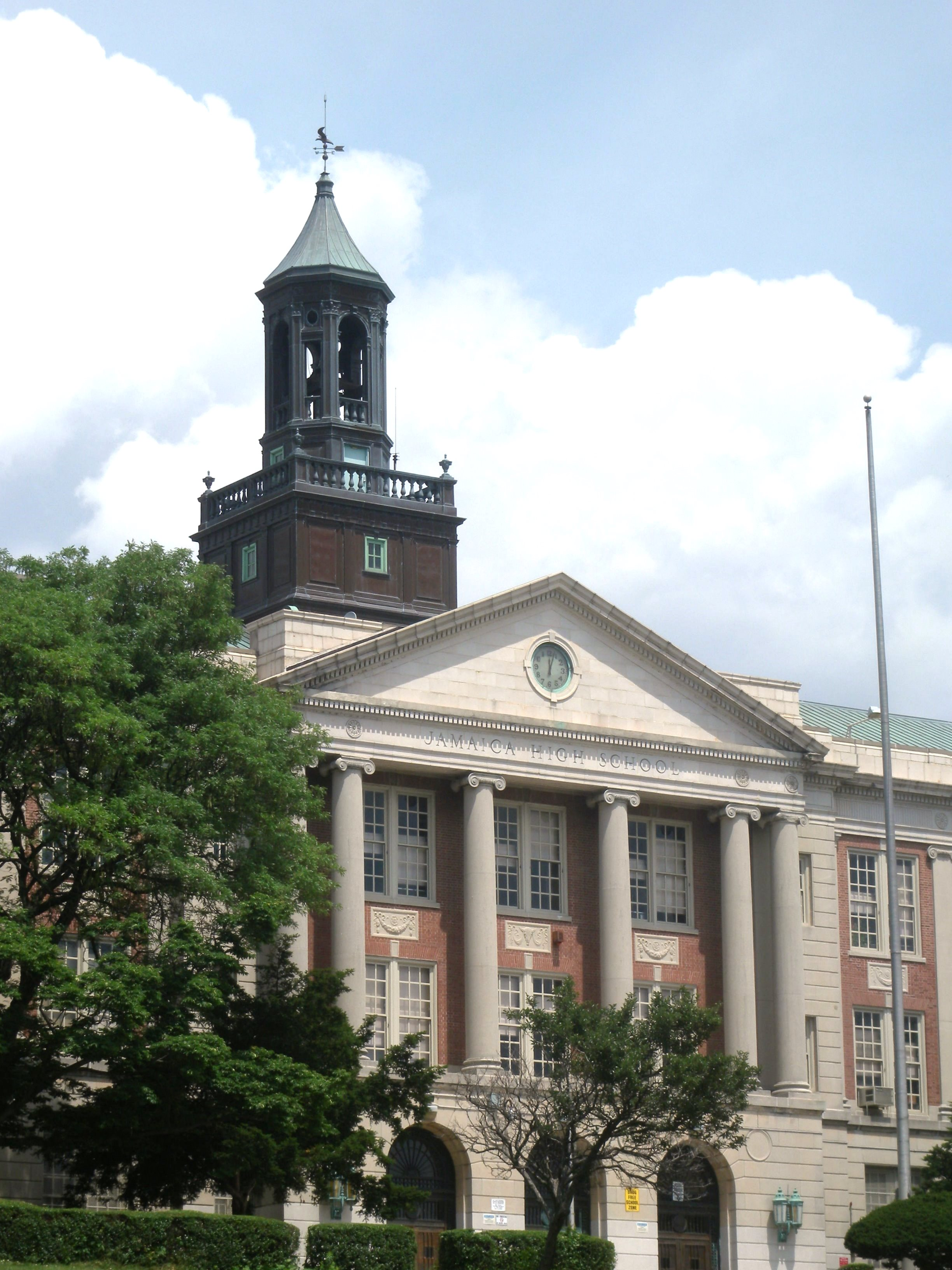
- Present building completed in 1927

Location
- 167-01 Gothic Drive; Jamaica, Queens, New York; United States; 40°42′52″N 73°47′54″W

Information
- Type: Public
- Established: 1892
- Status: Closed
- Closed: 2014
- Grades: 9–12
- Colors: Red & Blue
- Mascot: Beavers

Jamaica High School was a four-year public high school in Jamaica, Queens, New York. It was operated by the New York City Department of Education.

Jamaica High School was founded as the Union Free School in 1854, and located within a three-story wooden structure on what is now 161st Street. In 1897, it moved to a new campus located on Hillside Avenue and designed in the Dutch Revival style. By 1922, the school was considered overcrowded, and two annexes were built. Jamaica High School moved to its third campus, located in Jamaica Hills at the corner of 167th Street and Gothic Drive, in 1929. Due to high rates of crime and poor academic performance, the school closed permanently in 2014.

Jamaica High School's former campuses at Hillside Avenue and at 167th Street are landmarks designated by the New York City Landmarks Preservation Commission. The Hillside Avenue campus was administered by the New York City Board of Education after Jamaica High School had moved out, and was used by several schools. The 167th Street campus also remains open and is now officially known as the Jamaica Educational Campus. It houses four smaller separately-administered public high schools that share facilities and sports teams.

== Description ==
=== Original building ===
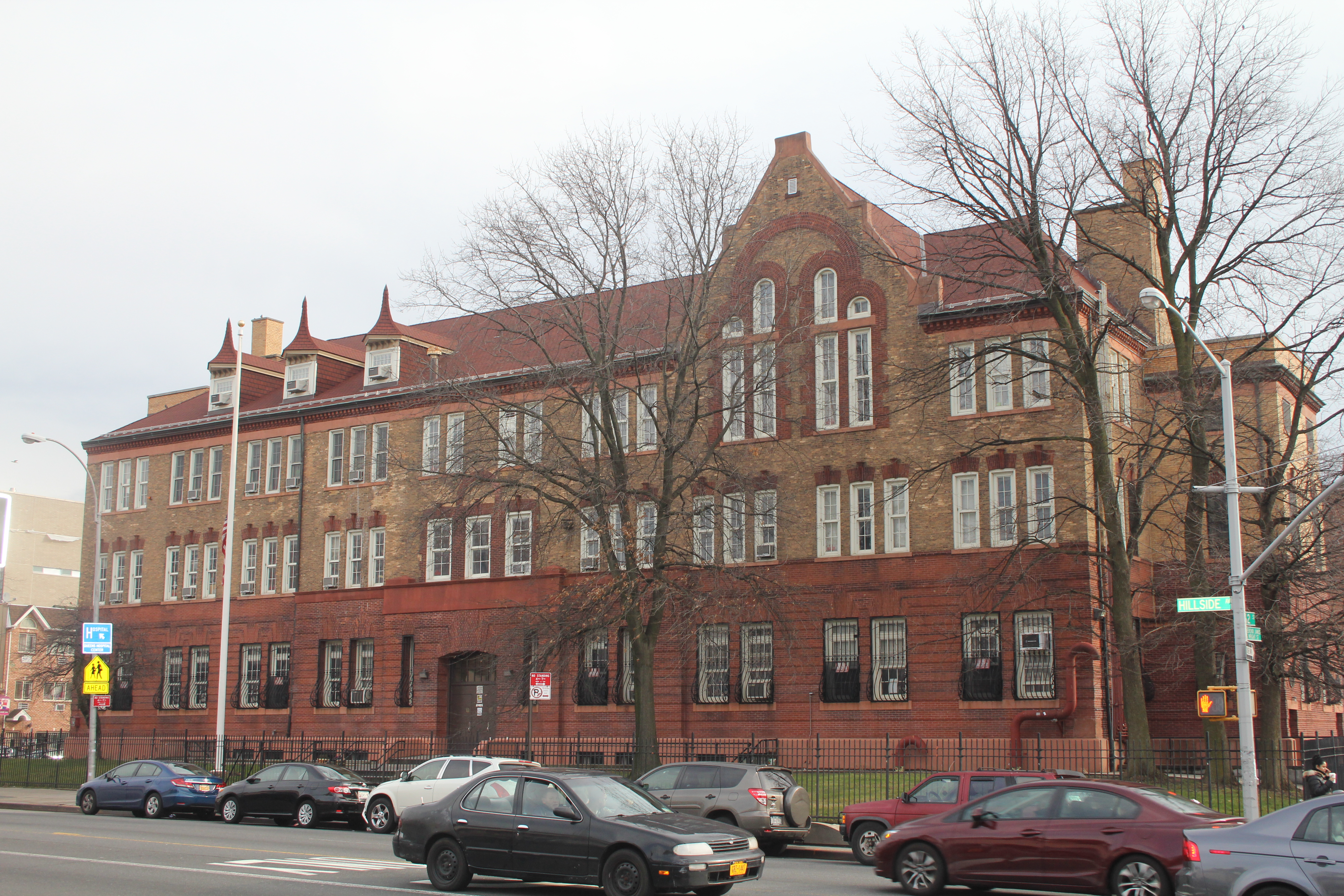
Former building on Hillside Ave., completed 1897

The first permanent location of Jamaica High School, opened in 1897, is located at 162-02 Hillside Avenue, on the south side of Hillside Avenue between 162nd and 163rd Streets, near Jamaica Center. The building was designed by William Tubby, a well-known Brooklyn architect, in the Dutch Revival style. The Dutch Revival style was chosen as a nod to the roots of Jamaica and all of New York City as Dutch colonies.

It is a three-story structure with a raised basement, constructed of red and tan brick; the tan bricks have since darkened from their original shade. The school features several decorative design elements, including splayed lintels, a stepped gable at top of the right (west) side of the front facade with arched windows, and a hipped roof. At both the east and west ends of the building are two enclosed stairwells, installed in 1904. The building originally featured a bell tower, which has since been removed. A parking lot is located at the rear of the school. The building was designated as a New York City landmark in 2013.

=== Current building ===
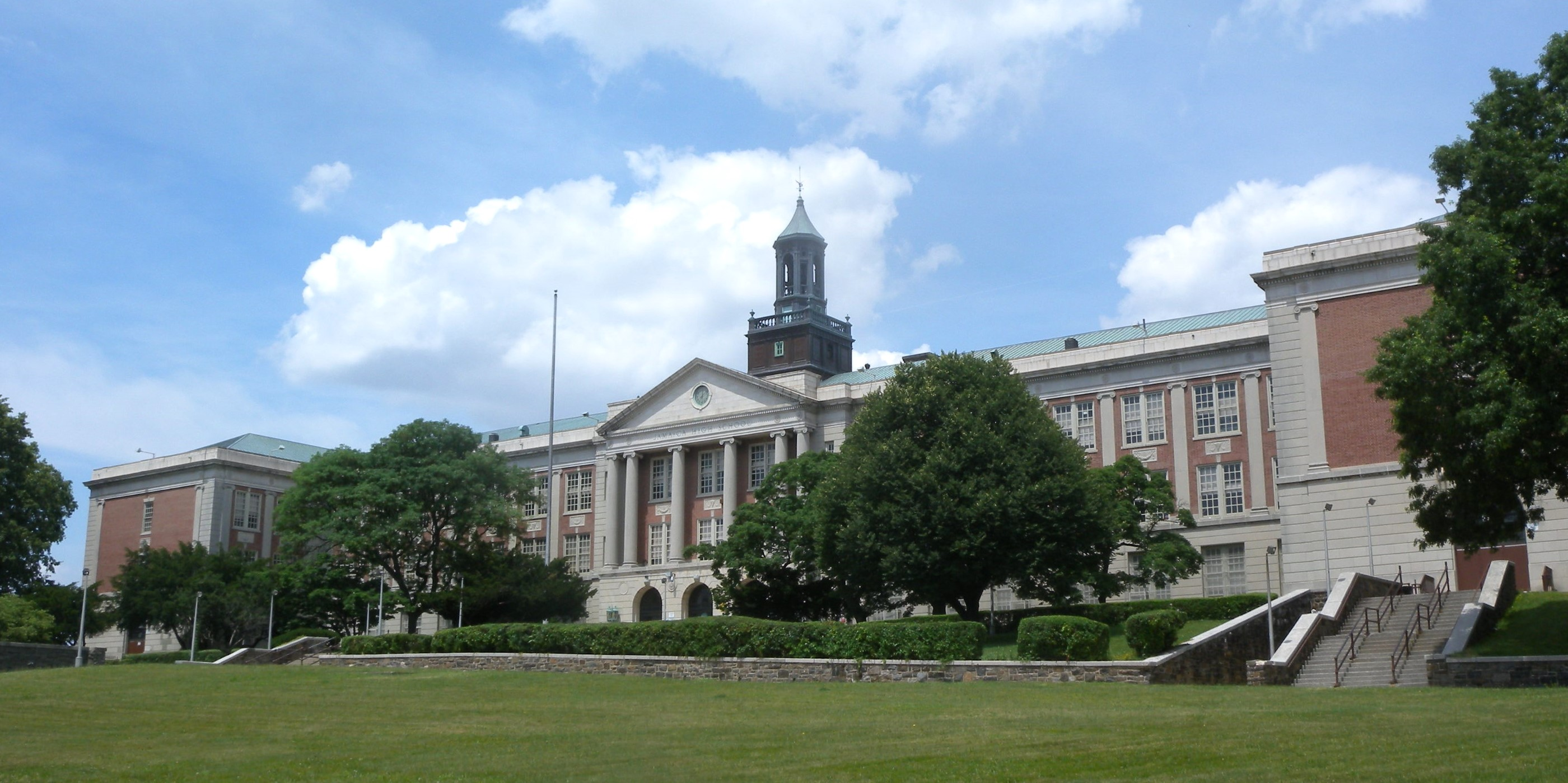
The present building with its generous lawn

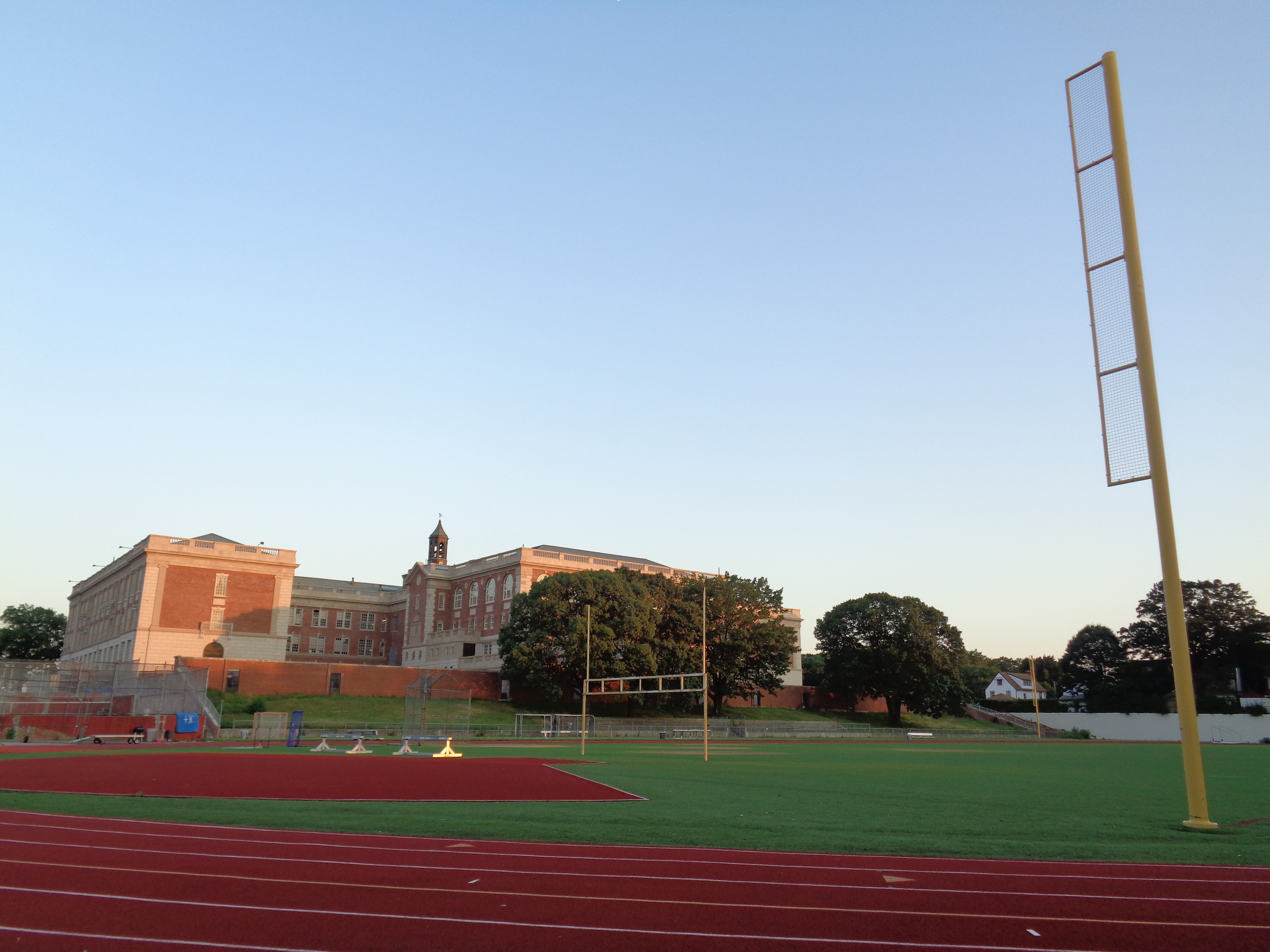
The athletic field to the rear (north) of the school

The current Jamaica High School campus opened in 1927, and is located on a large tract between 168th Street to the east and Chapin Partway to the west in the Jamaica Hills section of Jamaica, across from Captain Tilly Park. The school faces towards Gothic Drive at the south end of the campus. 84th Avenue marks the north end of the site, one block south of the Grand Central Parkway. The property is 13 acres (5.3 ha) in size. This large expansive campus is unconventional for a New York City school. Across 84th Avenue is Thomas A. Edison High School, a vocational school. Across to the south and west is Captain Tilly Park. The campus occupies a hilltop location with commanding views on Gothic Drive. When the building first opened, views were available across to the bodies of water surrounding Long Island: the Long Island Sound, East River, and Atlantic Ocean. A large lawn separates the school building from Gothic Drive, with a stone stairway and pathway leading up from the street to the school. An iron fence encircles the entire property.

The building stands three stories high with a basement, extending horizontally 400 feet (120 m) east-to-west over the large property. It occupies 625,000 square feet of space. The school features an auditorium, swimming pool, and two gymnasiums. It also contains numerous science labs and demonstration rooms, computer labs, a library, and a cafeteria. The auditorium was designed to seat 1,500 with a balcony for 200. An organ was installed in the auditorium in 1931 by Estey Organ, identical to six others installed in other New York City high schools. The organ is no longer operational. The gyms are located on the second and third floors, intended for boys and girls respectively. The swimming pool, located in the basement below the gyms meets short course competition regulations, measuring 28 feet by 75 feet. The cafeteria is also at basement level. Today certain spaces such as the gyms and auditorium are shared between the current small schools. The building was designed with a 3,388 student capacity, although the school's enrollment has been higher than that number in the past. The building currently has a "target capacity" of 2,116 students set by the Department of Education.

The building was designed by William H. Gompert in the Georgian Revival style, occasionally referred to as "colonial" style during its construction. It forms a symmetrical "E" or "W" shape. This layout features two outer wings holding 83 classrooms, and a central wing which houses the building's auditorium, gymnasiums, and swimming pool. The wings have an axial arrangement, meeting in the center at the entrance hall and extending northward 200 feet (61 m) towards the rear of the school. The central wing extends farther than the east and west wings; this projection houses the gyms and pool. The design was intended to maximize the circulation of light and air into the building. This layout would be utilized in future high schools in the city, beginning with Samuel J. Tilden High School and Abraham Lincoln High School both in Brooklyn.

The outer facade consists primarily of red brick, trimmed by stone and terracotta. The first story facade is entirely limestone. The entrance pavilion is characterized by granite Ionic columns, atop which sits a triangular pediment with a clock in the center. Between the pediment and columns is a terracotta cornice inscribed with the name "Jamaica High School". Above the roof of the entrance is a cupola which may have originally functioned as a bell tower. The roof of the school is copper, but has developed a green patina due to oxidation. Inside the building is a mural of the history of Long Island, installed in 1930.

The northern half of the property is occupied by the large athletic complex. Its main feature is a multi-purpose field for football, baseball, softball and other sports, circumscribed by a running track. At the southeast corner of the complex are tennis courts. The field is artificial turf, with dirt cutouts and mounds for baseball and softball. It also contains a brick field house. The entire field was renovated under the "Take the Field" initiative in the early 2000s. A concrete grandstand for spectators was originally planned but never constructed. It is now an open sloped grass lawn between the field and school.

There are three primary entrances to the building: the main entrance hall, with three doors below the ionic columns, and doors to the east and west wings. A 12-foot (3.7 m) wide pathway runs east-to-west connecting with the entrances, and leading to gates in the fence at 168th Street and Chapin Parkway. The central pathway from the school to Gothic Drive splits in two separate stairways before intersecting with the street, forming a crescent shape. The pathways were installed shortly after the school opened. In front of the school where the stairway splits is a memorial to the Jamaica High School alumni who fought in World War II. It was designed by sculptor Paul Fjelde, and installed in 1948. The memorial is bronze, but has been oxidized green. Prior to the war, a different sculpture and/or fountain had been in its place, installed along with the pathways. The school building was designated as a New York City landmark in 2009.

==== Transportation ====
The Q65 bus route runs north-to-south along 164th Street just west of the school. The closest New York City Subway station is the 169th Street station of the IND Queens Boulevard Line on Hillside Avenue. The Q65 connects with the Parsons Boulevard station of the Queens Boulevard Line, as well as the Sutphin Boulevard–Archer Avenue–JFK Airport and Jamaica Long Island Rail Road stations farther south on Archer Avenue.

== Etymology ==
The name Jamaica is derived from the Lenape word Yameco meaning "beaver". Because of this, Jamaica High School's mascot is the beaver.

== History ==
The topography of Long Island including that of the Jamaica neighborhood was formed during glaciation, which created a terminal moraine running east-to-west across the center of the island. The Jamaica Hills neighborhood and the current Jamaica High School building lie at the peak of the moraine, while Hillside Avenue where the old building is situated forms the southern edge of the moraine, and thus is at a much lower elevation.

=== Early years ===
What is now Jamaica High School was founded as the Union Free School or Public School No. 1, located on Herriman Avenue (now 161st Street). This building was constructed in 1854 and opened on July 12 of that year, accommodating students aged 5 to 18. The school was a three-story wooden structure. On December 14, 1892, a charter was granted for the high school by the New York Board of Regents. At this time, the school was declared to be a "Union School" by the Board of Regents, due to its status as both a grammar and high school. High school classes were conducted on the third, top-most floor of the building.

In June 1894, an appropriation of $100,000 was made to build a new school building to replace the Herriman Avenue location. In 1895, the Jamaica Board of Education purchased the lot on Hillside Avenue in order to construct the new school. It was originally intended as a combined high school and "grammar school" (secondary school) known as P.S. 47, although it was predicted that increasing enrollment would force the use of the building exclusively for high school students. Ground broke at the Hillside Avenue site on May 20, 1895. The cornerstone for the new building was laid on October 22, 1895. It was dedicated on November 27, 1896. After construction delays, Jamaica High School opened in its new building in January 1897. The new building was considered more stylish and elaborate than the structure it succeeded.

At the time of its opening, the school was administered by the Board of Education of the independent Town of Jamaica. The school's enrollment grew rapidly along with the population of Jamaica, which became part of New York City in 1898, at which time the school came under the jurisdiction of the New York City Board of Education. Until the turn of the century, both Jamaica High School locations were racially segregated, barring African American students from attending. In March 1900, the New York State Legislature passed a bill barring segregation within New York state schools, later signed into law by Governor Theodore Roosevelt. In 1904, due to new city fire codes, the staircases at the sides of the building were installed. In 1909, primary school classes were moved to a separate location. By 1922, the school was considered overcrowded. In September of that year, an annex was opened at the former P.S. 50. A second annex was opened in 1923 in a garage across Hillside Avenue. A third annex was created in P.S. 109 in February 1926.

Following the relocation of the high school to Jamaica Hills, the Board of Education retained control of the older building and put it to various uses over the years. It housed the Jamaica Learning Center, an alternative public high school, at the time of its designation as a New York City landmark in 2013.

=== New building ===
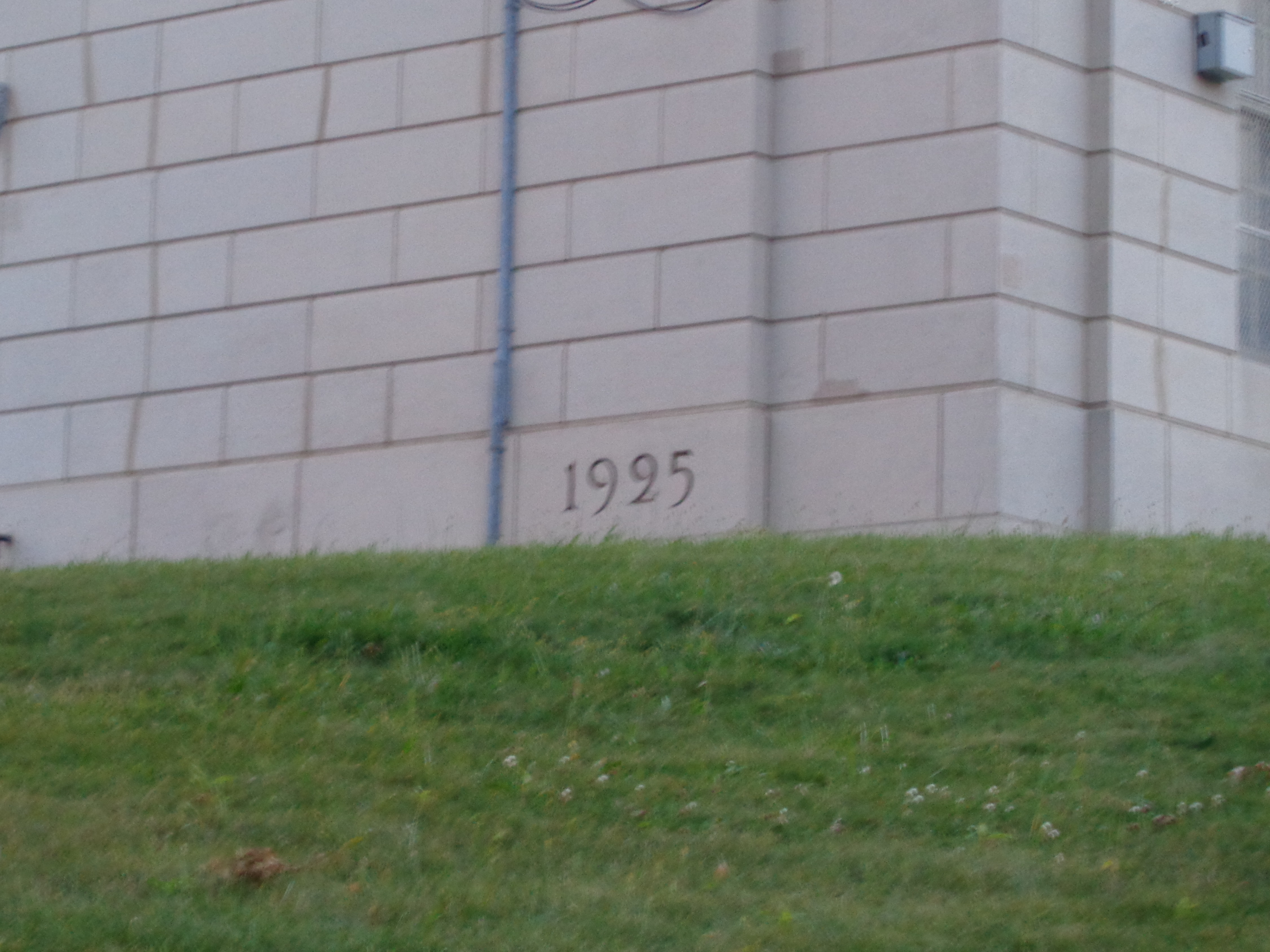
The cornerstone of the current building

The site of the current Jamaica High School building was originally part of the Clark estate. In the 1920s it was clear that a new, larger building for Jamaica High School would be necessary. There was, however, intense community debate over which site in the area should be selected for the new school. Among the sites considered were at Grove Street (now 90th Avenue) and Sutphin Boulevard near the Jamaica Long Island Rail Road station; at Wexford Terrace (87th Drive) just north of Hillside Avenue, known as the "Gracy site"; at Harvard Avenue (179th Place) and Hillside Avenue near Jamaica Estates, called the "Betts" site; and the Clark estate at Grove Street (168th Street), known as the "Clark site". In June 1923, the New York City Board of Estimate approved the Clark site, in spite of protests from local parents. By 1924, a preliminary design for the school was in place, created with the Clark estate site in mind. The Clark site was officially chosen 1925. Because of the topography of the area, it was decided to build the school facing south towards Gothic Drive, as opposed to facing 168th Street. Meanwhile, the height of the school was limited to three stories by architect William H. Gompert due to the profile of the site. Groundbreaking on the new building took place on March 16, 1925. One week later, an architectural drawing of the school was released. Excavation of the site's basement and swimming pool began in April of that year. Upon exhuming the site, it was discovered that the bed of the future building consisted of clay, similar to that of Goose Pond in nearby Captain Tilly Park. The cornerstone was laid at the southeast corner of the building on June 29, 1925.

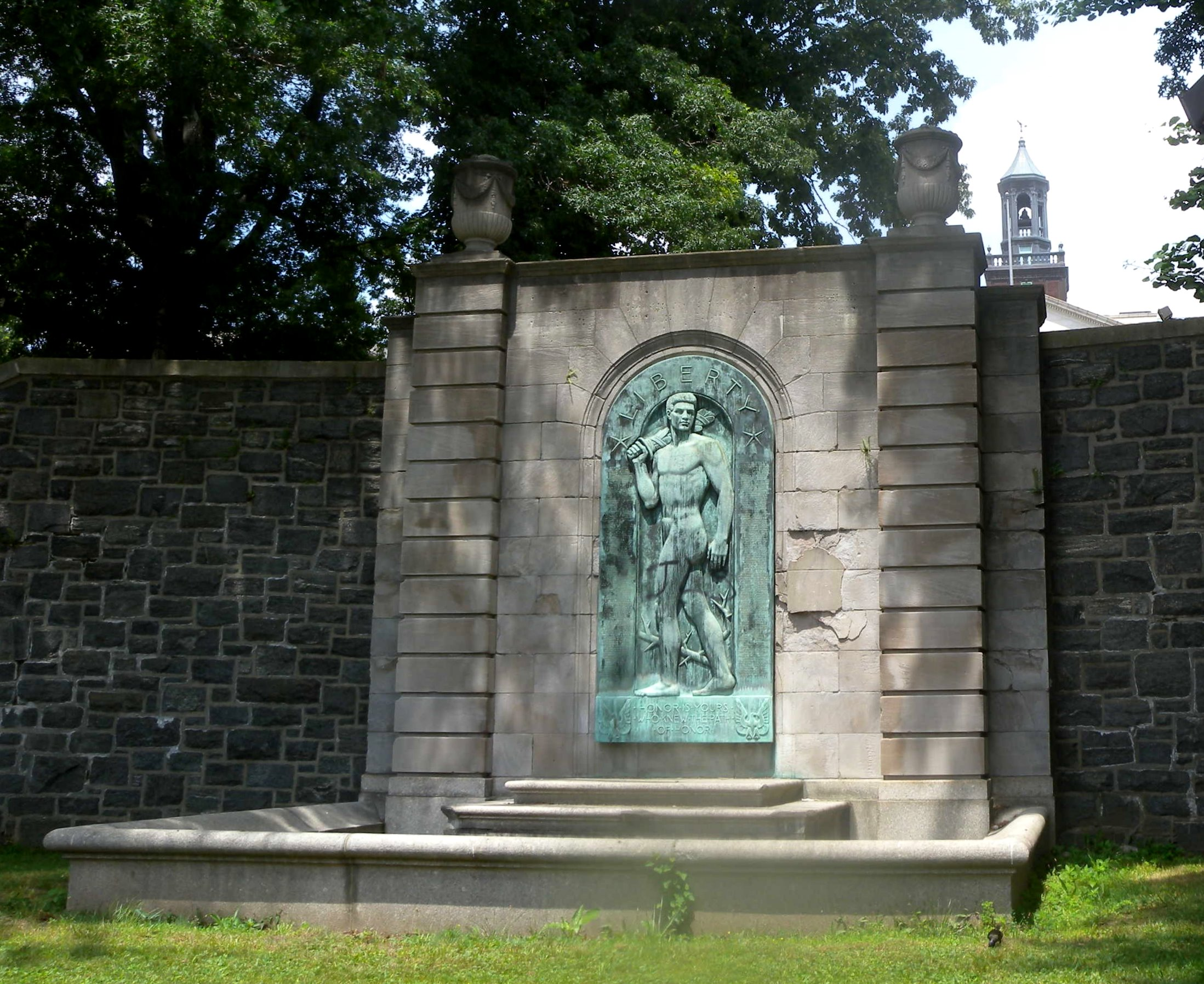
The World War II memorial facing Gothic Drive in front of the school.

By that year, accusations were already made towards Gompert of faulty construction and inferior material use at the new high school and other new schools under his watch. The new Jamaica High School building was opened February 1, 1927. It was officially dedicated May 12, 1927. The school cost $3 million to construct. At the time of construction, the school building was the largest in the United States.

A resolution to create park space around the school was reached on April 30, 1928. Around this time, the property immediately behind the school was acquired in order to create the athletic fields. Meanwhile, accusations of faulty construction persisted, evidenced by warping of school floors due to water damage. This and other accusations of shoddy craftsmanship led to Gompert's resignation from the Board of Education. Upon opening, the only available entrances to the school were at either side. Immediately in front of the school was a large wall of dirt, while six houses were situated along the north side of Gothic Drive; both obstacles impeded access to the school from the south at Gothic Drive and blocked views of its facade. A road provisionally named "Upland Parkway" had initially been planned directly in front of the school, but was not built. The lack of access lead to complaints from students. In May 1929, the homes in front of the school were acquired and razed to create the large lawn areas and entrance in front of the school.

In January 1930, the plans for the athletic complex were doubled in size, extending all the way to the Grand Central Parkway on what is now Thomas A. Edison High School. In addition to the current facilities, it would have included a field hockey court, and a large area fronting the parkway for either a polo field or 24 public tennis courts. In August 1931, the design for the new approach from the school to Gothic Drive was revealed. This included fountains at the site of the current World War II memorial. The athletic complex was first used on April 22, 1932, in a baseball game against John Adams High School. The field was dedicated on May 10, 1932, prior to a playoff baseball game between Jamaica and Richmond Hill High School. Temporary seating was erected for the event, with Mayor Jimmy Walker and Queens Borough President George U. Harvey in attendance. The first football game was played on October 1, 1932. The new approaches to the school were completed in 1933.

On November 10, 1948, the World War II memorial at the front of the school was dedicated. It cost $4,500. In its heyday in 1950, Jamaica High School's enrollment of 4,613 students was the largest in all of Queens. The school was known for its academic prowess and rigid academic standards. It was also known for its racially and demographically integrated student body, especially as surrounding Queens neighborhoods became more diverse into the 1980s. Jamaica High School was named the best secondary school in the United States in 1985 by the United States Department of Education, while having the third-lowest dropout rate in New York City. It was also one of 19 high schools in the country to receive a Carnegie grant that year. The Gateway to Higher Education was founded by New York City in September 1986, establishing a program within Jamaica High School.

=== Decline and closure ===
On November 5, 1986, a student was shot in the school's auditorium. The shooting foreshadowed the emergence of problems within Jamaica High School that had already plagued other schools in the city. While the school's academic reputation had declined compared to the previous decade, even in 1998 Jamaica High School had an on-time graduation rate of over 75 percent. However, graduation rates as well as enrollment declined rapidly into the 2000s. Crime and safety issues also began to afflict the school. In August 2007, Jamaica High School was added to New York State Education Department's list of "persistently dangerous" schools, after a 50 percent increase in violent crime through January of that year. It had already been labeled a "priority" school and later an "impact" school by the New York City government. In response, regular metal detector screenings were instituted, along with increased NYPD police presence, and a zero-tolerance discipline policy. In late 2007, it was discovered that an assistant principal prevented school deans from calling 911 in an emergency in order to lower the school's crime and disturbance incidence. A similar memo was later issued requiring several preliminary steps before calling 911. The assistant principal and the school principal were later reassigned. Under the provisions of the No Child Left Behind Act, students were allowed to transfer from the school, which may have led to a decrease in enrollment. This in turn led to teacher layoffs and a decrease in funding.

In August 2008, Jamaica High School was removed from the "persistently dangerous" list. In 2009, the current building earned designation as a New York City landmark, with a ceremony held June 17. However, that year the New York City Department of Education made plans to close the school, citing a graduation rate that "has stagnated below 50% for years", low performance grades, low attendance rates, decreasing enrollment, and safety issues. This decision was challenged in court, and protested by the local community and alumni. In Fall 2010, co-located small high schools began operating within the building. By 2011 the Board of Education began to phase out Jamaica High School, no longer accepting new students. During this time resources such as new textbooks were at a premium, while the school ceased offering advanced courses. The Department of Education was accused of starving the school of funds and resources, while giving preference to the new co-located schools. This included backlash from state senator Tony Avella. Jamaica High School closed permanently in June 2014, graduating its final class of only 24 students. The building, now officially the Jamaica Educational Campus, remains in use and houses smaller public high schools that share facilities and sports teams.

=== Current schools ===
As of 2010, four schools, each with a separate faculty and admissions procedures, share the Jamaica Educational Campus. They are:

School name	Enrollment	Theme
Jamaica Gateway to the Sciences	396	Math & science
Queens Collegiate: A College Board School	647	College preparatory
Hillside Arts and Letters Academy	420	Art & music
High School for Community Leadership	357	Community involvement

== Achievements ==
From 1982 until 1988, Jamaica High School had the only post-WWII high school lacrosse team among Public Schools Athletic League (PSAL) schools. Jamaica High School also held an annual boat race in their pool, where students demonstrated their knowledge of laws of physics and art skills. Following the renovation of its athletic field around 2003, Jamaica High School fielded a football team for the first time in around 50 years.

Principals for a Day included actors Ed Lover and Steve Harvey, and Gold medal Olympic winner and graduate of Jamaica High School, Bob Beamon. New York City Schools Chancellor Frank Macchiarola also served as an interim principal in late 1981.

== Notable alumni ==
- Marilyn Aschner (born 1948), professional tennis player
- Peter Afflerbach '74, literacy researcher and professor of education
- Obba Babatundé '69, (1951–), motion picture actor, television actor Dawson's Creek, appeared on Broadway in Dreamgirls
- Bob Beamon '65, Olympic athlete and world record holder in the long jump for 23 years
- Laurie Bird '53, film actress and photographer
- Anna Blackburne-Rigsby '79 (1961-), Chief Judge of the District of Columbia Court of Appeals
- Marcie Blane '59, (1944–), pop singer
- Ato Boldon '91 (transferred out), Olympic athlete
- Paul Bowles '28, (1910–1999), author and composer
- Art Buchwald '43, Pulitzer Prize-winning humorist and cartoonist
- John Carisi '38, (1922–1992), jazz trumpeter, composer and arranger
- Bill Chadwick, '33 (1915–2009) National Hockey League referee and Hall of Famer
- The Cleftones: Charlie James (McGhee) '55; William McClane '55; Herb Cox '55; Berman Patterson '55; and Warren Corbin '55 (deceased)
- William Jelani Cobb '87, author
- Francis Ford Coppola, (1939–), film director
- Julie Dash '68, film director
- Sidney Davidoff (1939-2025), lawyer and lobbyist
- Whitfield Diffie '61, cryptographer and one of the pioneers of public-key cryptography
- Ann Druyan '66, Emmy Award-winning and Peabody Award-winning television writer and producer, Creative Director of NASA's Voyager Interstellar Message Project
- Alan Dugan '41, (1923–2003), Pulitzer Prize-winning poet
- Frank Eck (1911–1987), AP Newsfeatures Sports Editor
- Gertrude B. Elion '33, (1918–1999). Nobel Prize winner, 1988 Physiology/Medicine.
- Ashrita Furman, (1954–) set more than 160 official Guinness World Records
- Danny Garcia '72 (1954-), MLB Baseball player, 1981 KC Royals
- Stephen Jay Gould '58, (1941–2002), paleontologist, geologist, historian of science
- Phyllis Graber; while at Jamaica High School she became the first officially sanctioned female member of a formerly all-male high school varsity tennis team in New York City
- Laura Z. Hobson '17, (1900–1986), author
- Sheila Jackson-Lee '68, (1950–2024) represents Texas's 18th congressional district
- Young Kwok "Corky" Lee '65, (1947-2021), journalistic photographer
- Samuel Leibowitz 1911, (1893–1978) attorney for the Scottsboro Boys
- Gerald S. Lesser (1926–2010), psychologist who played a major role in developing the educational programming included in Sesame Street
- Herbert London '56, candidate for New York mayor and governor
- Irving Malin '50, (c. 1934–2014) critic of postmodern fiction, editor, and anthologist
- John N. Mitchell '31, (1913–1988) Attorney General of the United States
- Fred Neulander '59, (1941–), Reform rabbi, convicted of murder
- Stuart A. Newman '61, Evolutionary developmental biologist
- Walter O'Malley '20 (1903–1979), owner of the Brooklyn and L.A. Dodgers.
- Letty Cottin Pogrebin, writer and journalist
- Charles Ruas '56, scholar, translator, critic, broadcaster, author
- Sabor Latino, hip hop artist
- Levell Sanders '94, basketball player and coach
- Michael Savage '58, author of health and nutrition books, radio talk show host
- Gunther Schuller '43, Pulitzer Prize-winning composer, author, and conductor
- Al Seiden '55, All-American basketball player at St. John's
- Bobby Susser '60, award-winning children's songwriter
- George Vecsey '56, sportswriter for The New York Times
- Joseph von Sternberg, (1894–1969) filmmaker (dropped out)
- Melvyn Weiss (1935-2018), attorney who co-founded the plaintiff class action law firm Milberg Weiss.
- Dolores Wilson, (1928–2010) opera singer and musical theatre actress
- Lester Wilson '59, (1942–1993) choreographer
- Alfred F. Young '41 (1925-2012), historian of the American Revolution
