= Larry Milberg =

American lawyer

Larry Milberg (1913–1989) was an American attorney.

He co-founded the plaintiff class action firm Milberg Weiss in 1965 along with Melvyn Weiss. He died in 1989 at the age of 76. Milberg died while playing tennis at his home near Great Neck, New York, in December 1989. Milberg was 76, and the obituary in the New York Times called him a "specialist in cases involving shareholder rights and class actions." (see http://www.portfolio.com/news-markets/top-5/2008/06/24/Former-Milberg-Partners-Identified)

He was an alumnus of Harvard Law School, graduating in 1936.
