= Afflerbach =

Afflerbach is a surname. Notable people with the surname include:

- Beatrice Afflerbach (1920–2003), Swiss graphic designer
- Juliane Sprenger-Afflerbach (born 1977), German hurdler
- Peter Afflerbach (born 1956), American educator and researcher
- Roy Afflerbach (born 1945), American lobbyist
