= Personnel Administrator of Massachusetts v. Feeney =

- Supreme Court of the United States

Argued February 26, 1979 Decided June 5, 1979
- Full case name: Personnel Administrator of Massachusetts et al. v. Feeney
- Citations: 442 U.S. 256 (more) 99 S. Ct. 2282; 60 L. Ed. 2d 870; 19 Fair Empl. Prac. Cas. (BNA) 1377; 19 Empl. Prac. Dec. (CCH) ¶ 9240

Case history
- Prior: 451 F.Supp. 143 (reversed and remanded)

Holding
- A state law giving hiring preference to veterans over nonveterans does not violate the Equal Protection Clause of the Fourteenth Amendment to the Constitution, even though many more men than women are able to take advantage of it. District of Massachusetts reversed and remanded.

Court membership
- Chief Justice Warren E. Burger Associate Justices William J. Brennan Jr. · Potter Stewart; Byron White · Thurgood Marshall; Harry Blackmun · Lewis F. Powell Jr. William Rehnquist · John P. Stevens

Case opinions
- Majority: Stewart, joined by Burger, White, Blackmun, Powell, Rehnquist, Stevens
- Concurrence: Stevens, joined by White
- Dissent: Marshall, joined by Brennan

Laws applied
- U.S. Const. amend. XIV

Personnel Administrator of Massachusetts v. Feeney, 442 U.S. 256 (1979), was a case heard by the Supreme Court of the United States. The decision upheld the constitutionality of a state law, which granted a hiring preference to veterans over non-veterans.

The law was challenged as violating the Equal Protection Clause of the Fourteenth Amendment to the United States Constitution by a woman who argued that the law discriminated on the basis of sex because few women were veterans.

== Background ==
A federal district court had struck down the law as unconstitutional based on its discriminatory impact: "The District Court found that the absolute preference afforded by Massachusetts to veterans has a devastating impact upon the employment opportunities of women. Although it found that the goals of the preference were worthy and legitimate and that the legislation had not been enacted for the purpose of discriminating against women, the court reasoned that its exclusionary impact upon women was nonetheless so severe as to require the State to further its goals through a more limited form of preference."

"Upon remand, the District Court... concluded that a veterans' hiring preference is inherently non-neutral because it favors a class from which women have traditionally been excluded...."

== Decision ==
Justice Potter Stewart wrote for the majority, joined by Chief Justice Warren Burger and Justices Byron White, Harry Blackmun, William Rehnquist, and John Paul Stevens. The Court declared the law was constitutional, pointing out the law's gender-neutral language, "legitimate and worthy purposes," and legislative history. Stewart recognized the need for intermediate scrutiny in gender-based discrimination cases: "any state law overtly or covertly designed to prefer males over females in public employment would require an exceedingly persuasive justification to withstand a constitutional challenge under the Equal Protection Clause of the Fourteenth Amendment." He also recognized that "when a neutral law has a disparate impact upon a group that has historically been the victim of discrimination, an unconstitutional purpose may still be at work."

The Court cited Arlington Heights v. Metropolitan Housing Corp. to apply a heightened form of review, a two-part test: "When a statute gender-neutral on its face is challenged on the ground that its effects upon women are disproportionably adverse, a twofold inquiry is thus appropriate. The first question is whether the statutory classification is indeed neutral in the sense that it is not gender-based. If the classification itself, covert or overt, is not based upon gender, the second question is whether the adverse effect reflects invidious gender-based discrimination... [which is] 'the condition that offends the Constitution.'"

The Court reversed the District Court after determining that there was no discriminatory purpose at work behind the law: "The appellee... has simply failed to demonstrate that the law in any way reflects a purpose to discriminate on the basis of sex."

== Dissent ==
Justice Thurgood Marshall dissented, joined by Justice William J. Brennan, Jr. Marshall saw the law as unconstitutional based on implied motivation from its discriminatory impact. "Where there is 'proof that a discriminatory purpose has been a motivating factor in the decision, . . . judicial deference is no longer justified.'" Marshall further states that "[t]o discern the purposes underlying facially neutral policies, this Court has therefore considered the degree, inevitability, and foreseeability of any disproportionate impact, as well as the alternatives reasonably available."

"In the instant case, the impact of the Massachusetts statute on women is undisputed. Any veteran with a passing grade on the civil service exam must be placed ahead of a non-veteran, regardless of their respective scores. The District Court found that, as a practical matter, this preference supplants test results as the determinant of upper level civil service appointments. Because less than 2% of the women in Massachusetts are veterans, the absolute preference formula has rendered desirable state civil service employment an almost exclusively male prerogative." Marshall pointed out the practical result of the preference law: "In practice, this exemption, coupled with the absolute preference for veterans, has created a gender-based civil service hierarchy, with women occupying low-grade clerical and secretarial jobs and men holding more responsible and remunerative positions."

Justice Marshall's dissent called for shifting the burden of proof from the individual to the state: "Where the foreseeable impact of a facially neutral policy is so disproportionate, the burden should rest on the State to establish that sex-based considerations played no part in the choice of the particular legislative scheme."

== See also ==
- Gender equality
- List of gender equality lawsuits
- List of United States Supreme Court cases by the Burger Court
- List of United States Supreme Court cases, volume 442
