= Accrington and Rossendale College =

Further education college in Accrington, Lancashire, England

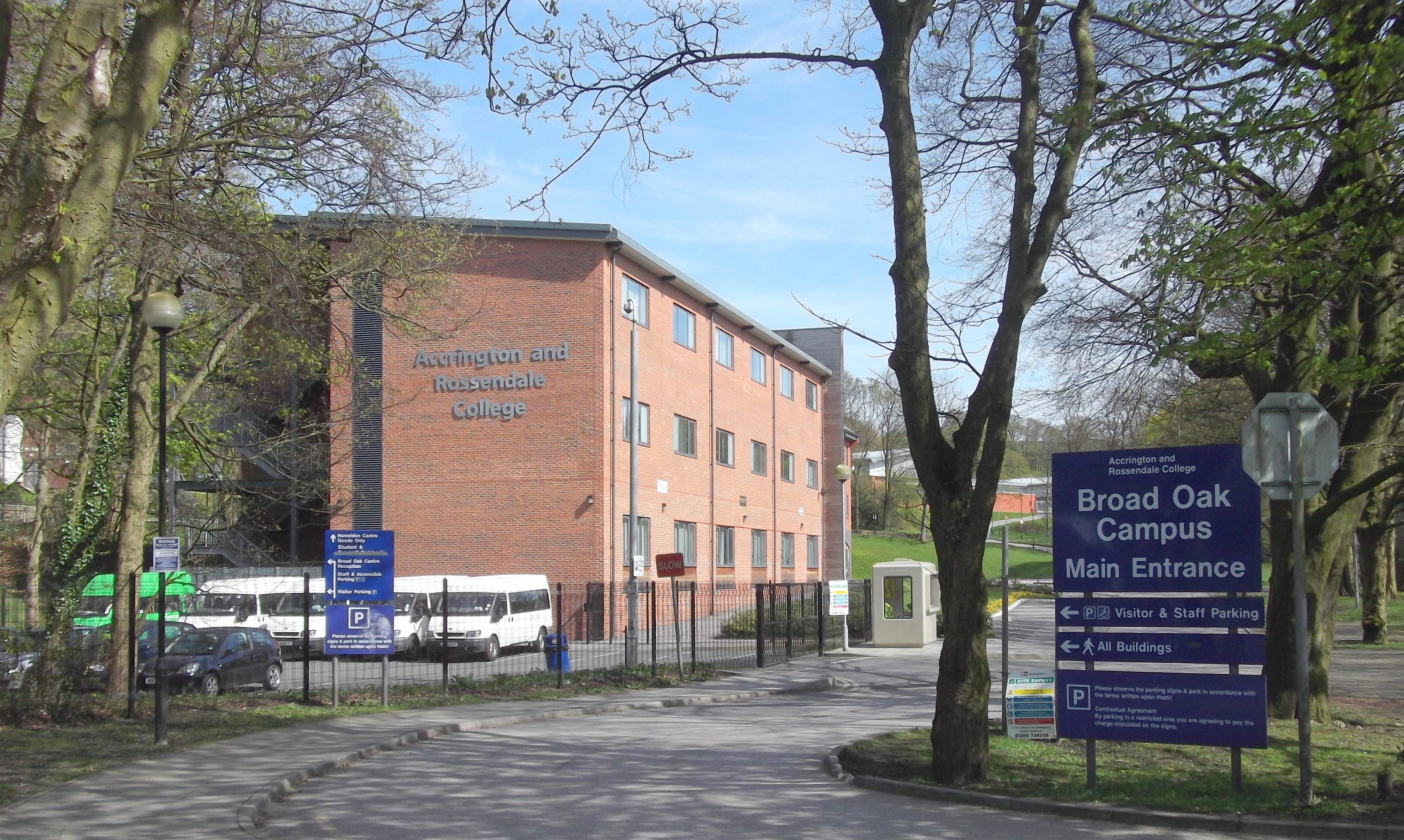
- Broad Oak campus
- Type: Further education
- Principal: Lisa O'Loughlin
- Location: Accrington; Lancashire; England; 53.748°N 2.355°W
- Website: https://www.accross.ac.uk/

Accrington and Rossendale College is a further education college based in Accrington, Lancashire, England.

== The College ==
Accrington & Rossendale College ('Across') is a further education college that specializes in vocational education. Offering qualifications ranging from entry-level to honors degrees, the college serves residents of Hyndburn, Rossendale, the Ribble Valley, and beyond. In 2018, it was awarded an OFSTED grade of 'Good' in all measures except Apprenticeships. In November 2018, Accrington and Rossendale College merged with Nelson and Colne College, incorporating Lancashire Adult Learning.

== The New Campus ==
=== The Coppice Centre ===
In 2007, 'Across' inaugurated its new £16 million Broad Oak Campus, featuring the new Coppice Centre. This new center houses TV, radio, dance, and recording studios, a 120-seat theatre, and a desktop publishing suite.

The college also relocated its Hair & Beauty departments to the Broad Oak Campus, which now operates as the "Seasons Salon" consisting of four hair salons and three beauty salons. It is also home to the 'Across' Travel Office.

=== The Hameldon Building ===
The Hameldon building houses the college's Construction and Motor Engineering workshops, along with several classrooms and meeting rooms.

The Motor Engineering department is made up of the Carl Fogarty Technology Centre and the Motorcycle Workshop.

The Construction Department has art workshops for different trade areas. These include Painting & Decorating, Carpentry & Joinery, Brickwork, Plumbing, Gas, Floor Covering, and Plastering.

=== The Broad Oak Centre ===
The largest and the oldest of the campus buildings, the four-story Broad Oak Centre is host to a number of curriculum departments and facilities. These include the Higher Education office, Information+; shop, ATMs, computer rooms, classrooms, and Library+.

Notably, the Library+ offers extensive computer access, internet connectivity, a dedicated study area, as well as a collection of DVDs, CDs, magazines, journals and newspapers. It also provides photocopying and scanning facilities.

The college's primary reception is on the ground floor of the Broad Oak Centre with the top floor consisting of the college's Innovation Centre, purposed to provide local and regional businesses with training, conference and meeting facilities. It comprises a Conference Room, Innovation Room and Lecture Theatre.

== Notable former students ==
- Carl Fogarty – Five-time world Superbike Champion
- Phil Neville – Former Man Utd Premiership winner and Everton captain
- Gary Neville – Man Utd Premiership, FA Cup, European Cup winner and England International
- Jeanette Winterson – Author of Oranges Are Not the Only Fruit, Winner of the Whitbread Prize for a first novel, and recipient of an OBE in the 2006 honors list

== See also ==
- Allonby v Accrington and Rossendale College
