= List of gender equality lawsuits =

This page has a list of lawsuits related to equality of the sexes.

| Lawsuit | Subject of lawsuit | Court of decision | Year of decision |
|---|---|---|---|
| Allonby v Accrington and Rossendale College | equal pay for work of equal value | European Court of Justice | 2004 |
| Association belge des Consommateurs Test-Achats ASBL v Conseil des ministres | prohibition of sexual discrimination in insurance policies and fares | European Court of Justice | 2011 |
| Attorney General v Dow | mother's ability to pass on citizenship to children | Botswana Court of Appeal | 1992 |
| Bhe v Magistrate, Khayelitsha | inheritance by women under customary law | Constitutional Court of South Africa | 2004 |
| Bliss v Canada (AG) | unemployment insurance benefits during pregnancy | Supreme Court of Canada | 1978 |
| Califano v. Goldfarb | protection afforded wage earners for surviving spouses | Supreme Court of the United States | 1977 |
| Canada (AG) v Lavell | Indian status retained or lost by Indian women marrying non-Indian men | Supreme Court of Canada | 1973 |
| Chen-Oster v. Goldman Sachs & Co. | certified class of over 2,000 female associates and vice-presidents challenging systemic discrimination in pay, promotions, and performance reviews | United States District Court for the Southern District of New York | 2018 |
| Chrapliwy v. Uniroyal, Inc. | segregated hiring and seniority system | United States Court of Appeals for the Seventh Circuit | 1982 |
| Craig v. Boren | age of majority for purchasing "nonintoxicating" beer | Supreme Court of the United States | 1976 |
| Equal Opportunities Commission v Secretary of State for Trade and Industry | incompatibility of employment equality regulations | High Court of England and Wales | 2007 |
| Fairchild v. Hughes | right to vote | Supreme Court of the United States | 1922 |
| Fraser v Children's Court, Pretoria North | consent to adoption by unmarried fathers | Constitutional Court of South Africa | 1997 |
| Fronterio v. Richardson | decided that benefits given by the United States military to the family of service members cannot be given out differently because of sex | Supreme Court of the United States | 1973 |
| Geduldig v. Aiello | disability insurance benefits for female workers during normal pregnancy | Supreme Court of the United States | 1974 |
| Goesaert v. Cleary | employment as bartenders | Supreme Court of the United States | 1948 |
| Gonzalez v. Abercrombie & Fitch Stores, Inc. | limits to minority and female employment | United States District Court for the Northern District of California | 2004 |
| Hong v. Facebook, Inc. | tech-employment sex and race discrimination | San Mateo County Superior Court | 2015 |
| Huang v. Twitter | class action sex discrimination lawsuit | | 2015 |
| J.E.B. v. Alabama ex rel. T.B. | Intentional discrimination on the basis of sex by state actors in the use of peremptory strikes in jury selection | United States Supreme Court | 1994 |
| Ledbetter v. Goodyear Tire & Rubber Co. | statute of limitations on pay discrimination | Supreme Court of the United States | 2007 |
| Leser v. Garnett | right to vote | Supreme Court of the United States | 1922 |
| Mauldin v. Wal-Mart Stores, Inc. | health insurance not covering prescription contraceptives | United States District Court for the Northern District of Georgia | 2006 |
| Mississippi University for Women v. Hogan | admission to School of Nursing | Supreme Court of the United States | 1982 |
| Mmusi and Others v Ramantele and Another | inheritance by women under customary law | Botswana Court of Appeal | 2013 |
| Native Women's Assn of Canada v Canada | financial support for interest groups | Supreme Court of Canada | 1994 |
| Orr v. Orr | alimony | Supreme Court of the United States | 1979 |
| Pao v. Kleiner Perkins | employment discrimination based on sex | San Francisco County Superior Court | 2015 |
| Personnel Administrator of Massachusetts v. Feeney | hiring preference to veterans over non-veterans | Supreme Court of the United States | 1979 |
| R v Sullivan | status of a fetus as a person, with implications for women's rights | Supreme Court of Canada | 1991 |
| Rajender v. University of Minnesota | employment discrimination based on sex | United States District Court for the District of Minnesota | 1980 |
| Reed v. Reed | administrating estates cannot discriminate between sexes | Supreme Court of the United States | 1971 |
| Roberts v. United States Jaycees | full membership | Supreme Court of the United States | 1984 |
| Rostker v. Goldberg | upholding the Selective Service Act of 1948 requiring only men to register for the military draft | Supreme Court of the United States | 1981 |
| Schultz v. Wheaton Glass Co. | equal pay for men and women | United States Court of Appeals for the Third Circuit | 1970 |
| Stanton v. Stanton | age of majority, with implications for child support | Supreme Court of the United States | 1975 |
| Stopps v Just Ladies Fitness (Metrotown) Ltd | admission policy | British Columbia Human Rights Tribunal | 2006 |
| Sessions v Morales-Santana | Statutory distinction in citizenship for unwed citizen mothers and unwed citizen fathers of foreign-born children | United States Supreme Court | 2017 |
| Thibaudeau v Canada | income taxability of alimony for child support received by ex-wife from ex-husband | Supreme Court of Canada | 1995 |
| Trociuk v British Columbia (AG) | control of identity on child's birth certificate | Supreme Court of Canada | 2003 |
| United Automobile Workers v. Johnson Controls, Inc. | fetal protection policies impede the hiring of females | Supreme Court of the United States | 1991 |
| United States v. Virginia | struck down the long-standing male-only admission policy of the Virginia Military Institute (VMI) | Supreme Court of the United States | 1996 |
| Wal-Mart Stores, Inc. v. Dukes | discrimination in promotions, pay, and job assignments | Supreme Court of the United States | 2011 |
| Weinberger v. Wiesenfeld | special benefits for widows and widowers caring for minor children | Supreme Court of the United States | 1975 |

== See also ==
- Ladies' night § Legality in the United States
