= William Lerach =

American disbarred lawyer

William "Bill" Shannon Lerach (born March 14, 1946, Ohio River Valley, Midwestern United States) is an American disbarred lawyer who specialized in private Securities Class Action lawsuits. The $7.12 billion he obtained as the lead plaintiff's attorney in the case against Enron is currently the largest sum ever recovered in a group of securities class-action lawsuits in U.S. history. In 2007 he pleaded guilty to obstruction of justice and was sentenced to two years imprisonment. In 2009 he was disbarred from practicing law in California. As part of the settlement, Lerach would not cooperate as a witness and his law firm would be protected from any further prosecution. Over the course of his career, it has been estimated that Lerach recovered upward of $45 billion on behalf of defrauded investors. Lerach has stated that about 85% of his cases were brought due to insider trading, which he described as “footprints in the snow.”

== Background ==
Lerach was appointed by President Clinton to the U.S. Holocaust Memorial Council in 1998. He was also a figure in ending the Joe Camel advertising and marketing campaign by RJ Reynolds. Lerach successfully argued the case in front of the California Supreme Court, stating that R.J. Reynolds' Joe Camel campaign constituted a fraudulent business practice because it targeted minors and induced minors and cigarette sellers to break the law.

In 2007, Lerach pleaded guilty to one count of obstruction of justice for concealing illegal payments to a plaintiff and ordered to forfeit $7.75 million. He was sentenced to a two-year prison term. He was disbarred in 2009. His case and sentencing were presided over by US District Court Judge John F. Walter.

Lerach earned his undergraduate and law degrees from the University of Pittsburgh. He gave the May 2003 Commencement Address "American Law: Instrument of Social Progress or Weapon of Repression?" at Pittsburgh's School of Law. The University of Pittsburgh bestowed one of its highest awards on Lerach, designating him a "Legacy Laureate" reserved for the university's most outstanding graduates. He was a major financial donor to Democratic Party organizations at the state and national level.

On a televised PBS broadcast, Lerach was part of a panel to discuss accounting fraud, corporate misconduct and securities laws and regulations on the program, "NOW with Bill Moyers" on September 27, 2002 and November 21, 2003.

== Cheney and Halliburton ==
Lerach was successful in suing some of the largest names in American business and was suing Halliburton and its then CEO Dick Cheney, the Vice President of the United States, when he fell from grace. Lerach had turned his sights on Halliburton and Cheney, the former CEO. In Lerach's lawsuit against Halliburton, he argued that Cheney had fled the company just ahead of the stock collapse, finding refuge in the White House. The attorney was in a position to subpoena and demand public testimony from the vice president, and he doubted that Cheney would be able to successfully hide behind a claim of executive privilege.

== Guilty plea and imprisonment ==
Before leaving his law practice in August 2007, Lerach was a partner in the San Diego–based firm Lerach Coughlin Stoia Geller Rudman & Robbins, now known as Robbins Geller Rudman & Dowd. He had founded the firm in 2004 as a spinoff from Milberg Weiss Bershad Hynes & Lerach; the latter firm was subsequently indicted in 2006 for splitting fees with clients in its class action securities lawsuits, a scheme in which Lerach would later plead guilty to have taken part in.

According to a June 2007 statement in which he alluded to the ongoing Milberg Weiss investigation, Lerach said he was considering retirement from Lerach Coughlin. On August 31, 2007, Lerach left the firm, which first changed its name to Coughlin Stoia Geller Rudman & Robbins and later to the Robbins Geller of today.

Lerach pleaded guilty to one felony count of conspiracy to commit obstruction of justice and making false declarations under oath related to his involvement in the Milberg Weiss kickback scheme. On February 11, 2008, he was sentenced to two years in federal prison, two years' probation, fined $250,000, and ordered to complete 1,000 hours of community service. He was imprisoned at the Federal Correctional Facility, Safford, Arizona. The final two-and-a-half months were spent in home confinement following stints in the Arizona federal prison and a halfway house in San Diego. His license to practice law was suspended in December 2008 and on March 12, 2009, he was disbarred by the California State Bar. He was officially released from custody on March 8, 2010. Lerach's former Milberg Weiss partner, Melvyn Weiss, was similarly sentenced in early June 2008.

In an interview following his release, Lerach offered his thoughts and opinions that possible political motivation and the timing of his indictment could have been likely factors in his prosecution. He also stated that his firm's modus operandi was generally accepted legal practice regarding lead plaintiffs in class action lawsuits.

== Circle of Greed ==
In March 2010, a book about Lerach's life and career was published. Circle of Greed: The Spectacular Rise and Fall of the Lawyer Who Brought Corporate America to its Knees was written by journalists Patrick Dillon and Carl M. Cannon. In the same month, Lerach and writer, Patrick Dillon appeared on KPBS-FM, the San Diego NPR affiliate, to discuss the book.

Lerach and co-author, Patrick Dillon discussed the book on KPBS-FM in San Diego in March 2010.

== Consulting and lecturing ==
In his post-law practice years, Lerach has regularly lectured in law school classes at the Univ of San Diego, Univ of CA-Berkeley, Univ of CA-San Diego in La Jolla and Univ of Southern California discussing his career and many epic battles fighting major corporate fraud and related matters. He has also lectured and been interviewed for many years on the financial crises facing many state pensions and, additionally, has served as a consultant re litigation in these matters. He has also delivered two lectures describing the battle to recover billions in damages for slave labor and theft of assets during the Holocaust at UC San Diego's Great Hall and at their Geisel Library.

== Lectures ==
The Holocaust Litigations: Defining Guilt, Extracting Reparations – with William Lerach from UC San Diego Geisel Library
