= Bliss v Canada (AG) =

- Supreme Court of Canada

Hearing: June 7, 8, 1978 Judgment: October 31, 1978
- Full case name: Stella Bliss v. The Attorney General of Canada
- Citations: [1979] 1 S.C.R. 183
- Prior history: Judgment for the Attorney General of Canada in the Federal Court of Appeal.
- Ruling: Appeal dismissed.

Holding
- Any inequalities between pregnant employees and non-pregnant employees is a result of nature, not legislation, and is not protected by section 1(b) of the Canadian Bill of Rights.

Court membership
- Chief Justice: Bora Laskin; Puisne Justices: Ronald Martland, Roland Ritchie, Wishart Spence, Louis-Philippe Pigeon, Brian Dickson, Jean Beetz, Willard Estey, Yves Pratte

Reasons given
- Unanimous reasons by: Ritchie J.
- Laskin C.J. and Spence J. took no part in the consideration or decision of the case.
- Overruled by
- Brooks v. Canada Safeway Ltd. [1989]

Bliss v Canada (AG) [1979] 1 S.C.R. 183 is a famous Supreme Court of Canada decision on equality rights for women under the Canadian Bill of Rights. The Court held that women were not entitled to benefits denied to them by the Unemployment Insurance Act during a certain period of pregnancy. This case has since become the prime example demonstrating the inadequacies of the Canadian Bill of Rights in upholding and protecting individuals' rights. This ruling was eventually overturned in Brooks v. Canada Safeway Ltd., [1989] 1 SCR 1219.

== Background ==
Stella Bliss had to leave her work due to pregnancy four days before giving birth. Due to her situation she was not entitled to full benefits under section 30 of the Act, but rather she was subject to section 46 which denied her benefits for a period of six weeks after childbirth.

Bliss challenged the limitation of benefits under section 46 as a violation of section 1(b) of the Bill of Rights which protects against discrimination based on sex and ensures "the right of the individual to equality before the law and the protection of the law". Bliss claimed that the law violated her right to "equality before the law".

The Board of Referees, then the employment tribunal, rejected her claim, but on appeal to the "Umpire," she succeeded. At the Federal Court of Appeal, the Umpire's decision was overturned.

== Opinion of the Court ==
Justice Ritchie, writing for a unanimous court, held that the Act was valid and did not violate the Bill of Rights equality provision.

Richie noted that the Act was a complete code that took into account the interests of women, and "any inequality between the sexes in this area is not created by legislation but by nature." This means that while the Bill of Rights guards against sex discrimination, in this case the discrimination was not against women but pregnant people. He rejected the argument that section 46 denied "equality before the law" and found that the Act was a perfectly valid exercise of Parliament's authority to create legislation.

== Aftermath ==
The decision in this case later influenced the equality rights in section 15 of the Canadian Charter of Rights and Freedoms.

In Brooks v. Safeway Canada (1989), the Supreme Court overturned Bliss. The Court found discrimination against pregnant people to be discrimination against women under the provincial Human Rights Code of Manitoba. Like Bliss, Brooks was not a Charter case, though the Court did consider a definition of discrimination under the Charter case Andrews v. Law Society of British Columbia.

Stella Bliss died of brain cancer at age 56 in Victoria, British Columbia, in 1997.

== See also ==
- Gender equality
- List of gender equality lawsuits
- Geduldig v. Aiello
- Pregnancy Discrimination Act
