= R v Sullivan (Canada) =

- Supreme Court of Canada

Hearing: October 30, 1990 Judgment: March 21, 1991
- Full case name: Mary C Sullivan and Gloria J Lemay v Her Majesty The Queen
- Citations: [1991] 1 SCR 489, 1991 CanLII 85, 63 CCC (3d) 97, 3 CR (4th) 277, 55 BCLR (2d) 1
- Docket No.: 21080
- Prior history: Split decision in the Court of Appeal for British Columbia.

Holding
- A fetus is not a person regarding the negligence law in the Criminal Code.

Court membership
- Chief Justice: Antonio Lamer; Puisne Justices: Bertha Wilson, Gérard La Forest, Claire L'Heureux-Dubé, John Sopinka, Charles Gonthier, Peter Cory, Beverley McLachlin, William Stevenson

Reasons given
- Majority: Lamer C.J., joined by Wilson, La Forest, Sopinka, Gonthier, Cory, McLachlin and Stevenson JJ.
- Dissent: L'Heureux-Dubé J.

R v Sullivan, [1991] 1 S.C.R. 489 was a decision by the Supreme Court of Canada on negligence and whether a partially born fetus is a person.

== Background ==
Two individuals were hired as midwives, though they were not members of the medical profession. During the childbirth, which took place in a home rather than a hospital, the mother's contractions stopped after the child's head appeared. The midwives tried to induce further contractions but failed, and after the mother was bruised, she was taken to a hospital, and the child was removed from her but was not alive. The midwives were charged with negligence regarding both the child and the mother. The British Columbia Court of Appeal, examining the common law, found that in order to be legally considered a person, one must be fully outside the mother's body and must be alive at birth. Thus, the midwives could not be guilty of negligence regarding the fetus, as negligence occurs only with respect to persons.

The Women's Legal Education and Action Fund and REAL Women of Canada became involved in the case as intervenors. LEAF argued against a fetus being recognized as a person, for purposes of women's rights. Meanwhile, the midwives alleged that it was REAL Women, and not the government, that primarily saw the fetus as a person and drove the issue. The majority of the Supreme Court replied the Crown pursued the issue with its own belief that if a fetus is not a component of its mother's body, it must be a person.

== Decision ==
The majority opinion, written by Chief Justice Antonio Lamer, addressed the definition of a person under the Criminal Code. While the Criminal Code indicated a fetus is not a "human being," REAL Women replied that it is still a person, if personhood is taken to be a wider category than human beings. Lamer said that there was no proof of this interpretation. Furthermore, the negligence law, enacted in 1954, seemed to have been developed with no debate regarding the difference between a person and a human being. A person and a human being would be the same thing. With this evidence of legislative history favouring the view that the fetus is not a person, the Court declined to decide that the fetus is not a person on the sole basis of sexual equality, as argued by LEAF. Instead, Lamer briefly wrote that "The result reached above is consistent with the 'equality approach' taken by L.E.A.F."

== Aftermath ==
On the question of whether a fetus is a legal person and thus has rights under the Canadian Charter of Rights and Freedoms, Professor Peter Hogg points partially to this case to say not. He also points to Tremblay v Daigle (1989), and a lower-court decision in Borowski v Canada (AG).

== See also ==
- List of gender equality lawsuits
- List of Supreme Court of Canada cases (Lamer Court)
