= Stopps v Just Ladies Fitness (Metrotown) Ltd =

British Columbian legal case

Stopps v Just Ladies Fitness (Metrotown) Ltd was a discrimination by sex case heard before the British Columbia Human Rights Tribunal that was significant in Canadian law because it found that a women-only admission policy of a public gym was not discrimination.

== The complainant ==
On October 2, 2004, Vancouver resident Ralph Stopps applied to the Just Ladies Fitness facility in Metrotown and was denied membership because he is male. Stopps filed a complaint with the British Columbia Human Rights Tribunal on November 21, 2006 that he was discriminated against because of his gender, violating s. 8 of the "Human Rights Code," which prohibits discrimination by sex. The tribunal, a panel of 9 females and 3 males, rendered its decision that the complainant had not established that he was discriminated against.

== The respondent ==
Just Ladies Fitness is a women-only fitness facility, although some men work there in management and maintenance. It was argued at the tribunal that women attend the facility because they feel demeaned by men gazing at them at unisex facilities. The facility also claimed that because it is cleaner, has smaller weights that are more suitable for females, and because it has prenatal fitness classes its women-only admission policy was justified. The managers argued that women pay higher fees at their facility than at other fitness facilities and that this proves that some women feel that going to a female only fitness facility is necessary, but does not constitute sexual discrimination.

== Tribunal decision ==
The Human Rights Tribunal ruled that the complainant had failed to prove on a balance of probabilities all the elements required to demonstrate that illegal discrimination had happened. Stopps still has the right to appeal the BCHRT's decision.

Firstly, the tribunal found that the complainant was not adversely affected by the denial of membership. His claim that the facility was nearer his home was incorrect, his claim that the free initial membership period was not significant and since he had not pursued other opportunities to join other gyms, the tribunal found he had no serious intention of working out at a facility, as he had never gone to any fitness facilities before, and did not attend any after he was denied membership at "Just Ladies Fitness".

Second, the tribunal found that the complainant failed to prove that his dignity has been adversely affected by his denial of membership. In British Columbia, one cannot receive compensation for being discriminated against unless one also proves that the discrimination demeaned their dignity, and Mr. Stopps failed to prove that his dignity had been significantly demeaned.

Third, the tribunal found that its purpose is to provide compensation for those who have actually suffered from being discriminated against, and that the tribunal should not be used to make a political point. The tribunal found that Stopps's claim was politically motivated, and filing such claims harms those who file legitimate claims of discrimination, including men who have been discriminated against and whose dignity has been demeaned.

== Similar cases ==
- State agency sues Santa Rosa Health Club

== See also ==
- Gender equality
- List of gender equality lawsuits
- Men's Rights
