= REAL Women of Canada =

- Abbreviation: RWOC
- Formation: 1983
- Type: Socially Conservative activist organization in Canada.
- Legal status: Active
- Purpose: Advocate Group and Public Voice, Educator and Network
- Headquarters: Ottawa, Ontario
- Region served: Canada
- Official language: English; French
- Affiliations: An official sponsor of World Congress of Families
- Website: Official website of REAL Women of Canada

REAL Women of Canada (French: Vraies Femmes du Canada) is a socially conservative advocacy group in Canada. The organization was founded in 1983.

REAL stands for "Realistic, Equal, Active, for Life". The group believes that the nuclear family is the most important unit in Canadian society, and that the fragmentation of the Canadian family is a primary cause of social disorder. It lobbies the Government of Canada in favour of legislation to promote what it believes to be the Judeo-Christian-Islamic model of family life, and to support homemaking. REAL is also opposed to feminism, abortion and LGBT rights including same-sex marriage.

== Interventions ==
The group has intervened in Supreme Court of Canada cases including R. v. Morgentaler (1993) and M. v. H. (1999). In R. v. Sullivan (1991) it argued that a fetus is a person and the only thing different between a fetus and a baby is a short amount of time.

== Objectives ==
According to its website, its aims are to emphasize the importance of the family and legally promote what it refers to as a "Judeo-Christian" understanding of marriage and a nuclear family, to promote homemaking, and to oppose abortion and assisted suicide.

Part of their economic policies to help meet their objectives are increased tax relief for single-income families, families with children, and individuals with children.

REAL Women is similar in political and social outlook to Phyllis Schlafly's Eagle Forum and to Concerned Women for America in the United States.

The organization criticized individuals who have spoken out against Uganda's criminalization of homosexual relations. On August 7, 2013, the group issued a statement criticizing Foreign Affairs Minister John Baird for speaking out on LGBT human rights issues in both Uganda and Russia as part of Canada's foreign policy.

== History ==
In January 1983, Judy Erola, the federal cabinet minister for the status of women, proposed scrapping the tax exemption for dependent spouses, including mothers at home raising young children. Seeing this change as anti-family, persons active in the anti-abortion campaign began to speak out in opposition. On September 3, 1983, a group of Ontario women formed what would become known as REAL Women: Realistic, Equal, and Active for Life. REAL Women was dissatisfied with how feminist organizations addressed women's issues, and said that many housewives felt disparaged and attacked by these organizations. REAL Women was formed as an anti-feminist counterweight to the National Action Committee on the Status of Women. A press conference was held in 1984 officially announcing their formation. The group claimed initially to have 10,000 members, however this was later discredited. The year following their formation, the group held its first national conference, claiming to have 20,000 members, though this could not be verified.

REAL Women said it represented a silent majority of women within Canada. They promoted male-led, single-breadwinner families, and believed that women should be homemakers, mothers and wives. Their views and beliefs greatly differed from the stance taken by the National Action Committee on the Status of Women and its umbrella organizations, and the group argued against the equality guarantees already enacted in the Canadian Charter of Rights and Freedoms: they denounce the equal rights clause in the Canadian Charter of Rights and Freedoms and feminist movements and organizations, and they argue that government spending and funding of these feminist organizations is undermining traditional gender and family relations. 1987 its president Lynne Scime stated that "REAL women want to look at issues such as how a woman can pick a husband to fulfill her needs". They believed that women are naturally nurturing, emotional and dependent beings, suited to motherhood. They use the slogan "equal but different" while pushing for increased tax credits for stay-at-home mothers, . and have made suggestions on how to augment the options and resources available to families.

REAL is directly opposed to stances that organizations such as the National Action Committee advocates. One is abortion, which REAL opposes, claiming it is murder. In addition, the group opposes the idea of the universal childcare model, as they believe that governmental childcare represents a loss of parental control and increases the influence of the state on the family. They argue that the funding would be better spent on things such as courses on parenting skills. REAL also opposes laws guaranteeing equal pay for women, believing that this would reduce the income disparity between genders, draw women into the paid labour force, and incentivize the economic position of female-led households. They believe this represents a major threat to family values, demeans women and breaks down the traditional family. They also believe that women taking men's jobs will destroy the free market economy. Other viewpoints they oppose include programs to reduce family violence, which they claim encourage hatred toward men; no-fault divorce; and human rights protections for gays and lesbians. The overarching goal of REAL Women is to support the way of life traditionally associated with the 1950s nuclear family and arch-conservative values. Their belief is that their activism contributes to women's equality and will improve their lives. Their monthly newsletter, Reality, mirrors the American conservative movement. It regularly attacks feminists such as Flora MacDonald as well as feminist campaigns.

REAL Women of Canada endorsed Derek Sloan as candidate in the 2020 Conservative leadership election.

== Archives ==
There is a REAL Women of Canada archival deposit at Library and Archives Canada. The archival reference number is R11007. The deposit covers the date range 1970 to 2015. It contains 16.7 meters of textual records; 2 videocassettes; 5 photographs.
