= Mauldin v. Wal-Mart Stores, Inc. =

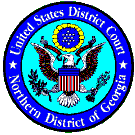
- Court: United States District Court for the Northern District of Georgia
- Full case name: Mauldin v. Wal-Mart Stores, Inc.
- Decided: November 22 2006
- Citation: Civil Action No. 1:01-CV-2755-JEC

Holding
- A company's refusal to include contraceptives in its health insurance plan is discriminatory.

Case opinions
- Majority: Julie E. Carnes

Laws applied
- Employment discrimination

Mauldin v. Wal-Mart Stores, Inc. was a sexual discrimination class action lawsuit filed on October 16, 2001, in the United States District Court for the Northern District of Georgia, seeking back pay and an injunction. The suit challenged Walmart's denial of health insurance coverage for prescription contraceptives. The case was granted class action status with an estimated 400,000 women eligible for participation in the lawsuit.

In September 2006, Walmart added prescription contraceptives to its health insurance coverage. In November 2006, the court ordered an investigation into whether illegal kickbacks were paid by Milberg Weiss to the lead plaintiff. The plaintiffs agreed to dismiss the case rather than permit discovery into the payments.

== Lawsuit ==
The lawsuit was filed by Lisa Smith Mauldin, a 23-year-old customer service manager at a Walmart store in Hiram, Georgia. Mauldin, a divorced mother of two, was working for 32 hours per week at a rate of US$12.14 per hour and spending $30 a month on birth-control pills. She had signed up for the company's health care plan in February 2000 only to learn that it did not cover her prescription contraceptives. Liza Featherstone of The Nation described this financial weight as "a significant burden for [Mauldin] (and certainly a prohibitive one for many fellow employees, who earn significantly lower wages)."

Mauldin sued Wal-Mart Stores, Inc., her employer, claiming that the defendant's health plan was in violation of Title VII of the Civil Rights Act of 1964 because its provisions did not provide coverage for prescription contraceptives. Mauldin sought to amend Walmart's health plan to include coverage for contraceptives and to receive reimbursement for the cost of contraceptives, pre-judgment interest, and attorneys' fees. Maudlin was represented by a legal team consisting of the law firm of Milberg Weiss as lead class counsel, George Stein as local counsel, Judy Applebaum of the National Women's Law Center, and the law firm of Heller, Horowitz & Feit.

On August 23, 2002, U.S. District Judge Julie Carnes granted the case class action status, allowing all women who had been covered by Walmart's Associates Health and Welfare Plan since March 2001 and who had been using prescription contraceptives to join the lawsuit. Attorney George Stein estimated the number of eligible women as 400,000. Walmart requested that the court reconsider the granting of class action status but on September 30, 2003, the court denied its request without prejudice. The parties filed cross-motions for summary judgment, but the court did not rule on those motions.

== Improper payments ==
In 2006, the court found that Lisa Mauldin had received payments from her local counsel, George Stein, that the court called "highly irregular, and at the very least create an appearance of impropriety." Stein admitted to paying Mauldin checks totaling US$2250, but denied that it was to induce her to sue Walmart. According to Stein, the payments were loans for personal matters and a sponsorship for Mauldin's daughter to attend cheerleading camp. Lead counsel Milberg Weiss claimed they had no knowledge of the payments and indicated in their response to the court that Stein and Mauldin intended to withdraw from the lawsuit. The court at first denied Walmart's request to take discovery on Milberg Weiss. However, in a November 22, 2006 order, the court decided to allow discovery, noting that, "Given the evidence of suspicious payments to Mauldin, and the recent indictment of Milberg Weiss for recruiting plaintiffs to participate in class action lawsuits, discovery is warranted to ensure that Mauldin's EEOC charge was not fraudulently procured."

== Dismissal ==
In September 2006, Walmart decided to change its health care policy to include coverage of prescription contraceptives as part of a larger overhaul of its health-care plans. According to Walmart, this decision had nothing to do with the lawsuit.

On December 8, 2006, just a couple of weeks after the court's discovery order, the plaintiffs filed an unopposed motion to dismiss the case voluntarily, stating that the central purpose of the lawsuit had been achieved. Even though Milberg Weiss claimed that it had been successful, it did not request attorneys' fees for its five years of legal work; the dismissal prevented Walmart from investigating whether Milberg Weiss had broken the law, and also ended the plaintiffs' claim for back pay. On December 20, 2006, the court dismissed the case. Walmart's new health care policy went into effect on January 1, 2007.

== See also ==
- Wal-Mart Stores, Inc. v. Dukes, a sex discrimination class action against Walmart which began in 2000
- Gender equality
- List of class action lawsuits
- List of gender equality lawsuits
