= Frank Eck =

American newspaper writer and editor (1911–1987)

- Born: Francis Henry Eck; July 15, 1911; New York City, U.S.
- Died: October 16, 1987 (aged 76); Huntington, New York, U.S.
- Education: Jamaica High School
- Occupations: Sportswriter, sports editor
- Years active: 1928–1976
- Employer(s): Queens Evening News, New York Times, Long Island Daily Advocate, Associated Press
- Children: 1

Frank Eck (born Francis Henry Eck; July 15, 1911 – October 16, 1987) was an American newspaper writer and editor. He was with the Associated Press from 1943 until his retirement in 1976, and was the Sports Editor of AP Newsfeatures from 1946 through 1972.

== Early life and career ==
Born in Brooklyn and raised in Queens, New York, Eck was one of ten children born to Jacob Frank Eck and Lillian R. Andres. He attended Jamaica High School, where, at age 14, he served as high school sports correspondent. In 1928, the 17-year-old Eck was hired as Sports Editor of the newly founded Queens County Evening News, where he remained until 1933. From 1933 through 1937, he was a reporter with The New York Times.

Employer notwithstanding, on July 1, 1935, in the annual exhibition contest between Brooklyn and New York chapters of the Baseball Writers' Association of America, Eck, cast in the role of the Brooklyn-born 'ringer,' delivered a game-winning, ninth-inning three-run homer off losing pitcher Louis Effrat in Brooklyn's 18-15 decision.

As of April 1939, Eck was employed in some capacity by Neary Memorials, Inc. at St. John's Cemetery in Middle Village, Queens. In 1940 and '41, he was publicity director for the Metropolitan Baseball Association. His job title—along with his part in compiling and making available league stats—was occasionally cited in local coverage of the M. B. A.; two of the first such instances concern Springfield Greys player-manager and former major leaguer Overton Tremper's pursuit of the Association's batting crown.

In 1941, Eck was also employed at least briefly by The Brooklyn Daily Eagle.

== AP Newsfeatures (1946–1972) ==
After about a year and a half in the ranks of AP Newsfeatures Sports Writers, Eck succeeded his predecessor, Chip Royal, as Sports Editor in May 1946.

One notable feature of Eck's tenure as AP Newsfeatures Sports Editor was an abundance of articles on the theme of "My Biggest Thrill," ghostwritten for athletes and coaches, including many Hall-of-Famers from a variety of sports. In baseball, there was Rogers Hornsby, Mickey Mantle, Stan Musial, Eddie Mathews, Duke Snider, and Ralph Kiner, pitchers Warren Spahn and Robin Roberts, managers Casey Stengel and Al Lopez, Others included boxers Joe Louis and Billy Conn, jockey Eddie Arcaro, and golfers Lloyd Mangrum, Craig Wood, Johnny Farrell, Jimmy Demaret and Roberto De Vicenzo.

== Clemente's 'ghost' ==
In November 1971, Pittsburgh Post-Gazette sports editor Al Abrams reported that Eck had been approached to serve as the as-told-to author of an autobiography of newly crowned World Series MVP, Roberto Clemente. As noted by Abrams in a prior column, Clemente had already informed prospective collaborators that he would use a tape recorder to ensure that everything printed "will be the way I say it."

The following March, not only was Eck's participation confirmed, but his work-in-progress received a preliminary thumbs-up from Abrams. "Clemente's book, which will be co-authored by Frank Eck of the New York Associated Press office, is expected to net $50,000 from the publisher. I have heard some of the tapes and read a couple of the chapters. The book will offer excellent reading when it comes out in six months."

Abrams' timetable notwithstanding, September came and went, as did Pittsburgh's Series repeat hopes, and even Clemente's ill-fated New Year's Eve flight before any further news emerged. It was not until March 3, 1973, that Abrams—after briefly referencing four Clemente biographies soon to be published by an unspecified wire service—broke the news that "Frank Eck, New York Associated Press sports writer, says he has the only real book on Clemente ... composed of taped interviews." Eck's claim—and/or the finished product—evidently failed to impress potential publishers; indeed, it appears to be the final published mention of this project, if not quite Eck's final mention of the Pirate star. The following month, his piece on Vera Clemente's appearance at Pittsburgh's home opener was published in The Sporting News.

== Retirement ==
In the summer of 1976, as per the company's mandatory guideline, Eck retired from the Associated Press at age 65. During the following decade, he occasionally covered local sports for The Long-Islander, penning a sometimes-weekly column under his own name as well as doing a small amount of ghosting.

== Personal life and death ==
Eck was married to, and divorced from, Violet Kathryn Bertram in the summer of 1933 and March 1934, respectively. Following a brief engagement to Dorothy Whitney Burtis, announced in August 1934, Eck was once again married to Bertram on February 9, 1935, and remained so for the rest of his life. They had one child, a daughter, Adrienne. In 1951, the family moved from Queens to the Town of Huntington in Suffolk County, Long Island.

On October 16, 1987, two days after being brought there with chest pains, Eck died at Huntington Hospital of a heart attack at age 76. His remains are buried at St Patrick's Cemetery in Huntington.

== Legacy ==
After his death, the Frank H. Eck Memorial Trophy was instituted, awarded each year to the best high school football team in Huntington Town.
