= Equal Opportunities Commission v Secretary of State for Trade and Industry =

Application for judicial review of implementation of equal opportunity legislation

Equal Opportunities Commission v Secretary of State for Trade and Industry [2007] IRLR 327 was an application for judicial review of the new implementation by the government of the Employment Equality (Sex Discrimination) Regulations 2005. It was alleged, and found, that they were incompatible with the Framework Directive, 2000/73/EC.

== Facts ==
The Equal Opportunities Commission applied for judicial review of the Employment Equality (Sex Discrimination) Regulations 2005 introduced by the defendant secretary of state. The Regulations had made amendments to the Sex Discrimination Act 1975 in order to implement Directive 2002/73. The commission argued that the amendments did not properly implement the Directive because,

- (1) the new s 4A(1) of the Act impermissibly imported causation into the concept of harassment by the words "on the grounds of her sex";
- (2) the new s 4A(1) wrongly required that the unwanted conduct had to be by reason of, or on the ground of, the complainant's sex;
- (3) the new s 4A(2) inappropriately imported an objective test into the definition of harassment;
- (4) they had failed to introduce liability on employers for discrimination by third parties;
- (5) they had impermissibly introduced the requirement for a comparator for the purpose of establishing discrimination on grounds of pregnancy, and that as it was not intended that there would still be a remedy for a woman complaining of discrimination by reference to pregnancy or maternity leave under s 1 of the Act in parallel with the new right under s. 3A of the Act, the new section would offend against the principle of regression because it would reduce the protection previously available;
- (6) the new s 6A(7) excluded a claim for discrimination during compulsory maternity leave that the complainant had been deprived of a discretionary bonus and s 6A(3) and s 6A(4) placed a substantial limit on discrimination claims that could be made in respect of the additional maternity leave period.

== Judgment ==
Judge Burton upheld the complaints and granted the application.

(1) It was the court's duty to construe statutes and regulations passed by Member States so as to render them compliant with a relevant Directive. However, in the instant case it was not appropriate to do so because of the degree of reading down or transposition that would be required to render the provisions compliant with the Directive, or it was not possible to do so because such extreme application of the requirement to interpret national legislation in accordance with Directives would not be effective or sensible because of the need for clarity, certainty and comprehensibility. Section 4A(1)(a) should be recast so as to eliminate the issue of causation, R. (on the application of Amicus) v. Secretary of State for Trade and Industry [2004] EWHC 860 (Admin), [2007] I.C.R. 1176 considered.
(2) There could be harassment of a woman if the effect of denigratory conduct, directed towards another party, not necessarily a woman, related to sex, but not of a sexual nature, had the effect of creating a humiliating or offensive environment for her. The new s. 4A(1) would have to be read down to produce that result and accordingly should be amended.
(3) Under the law of discrimination prior to the introduction of s. 4A of the Act the test was properly to be regarded as objective, Driskel v. Peninsula Business Services Ltd [2000] IRLR 151 EAT applied. Therefore, no issue of regression arose.
(4) So long as s. 4A was framed in terms of unwanted conduct engaged in "on the ground of her sex" by the employer, it was difficult, if not impossible, to see how an employer could be held liable for knowing failure to take steps to prevent harassment by third parties that created an offensive working environment for employees. Section 4A(1) should be recast to allow for such a claim.
(5) Section 3A should be recast so as to eliminate the statutory requirement for a comparator who was not pregnant or who was not on maternity leave.
(6) Section 6A should be recast so as to provide that discrimination claims that had previously been available should not be excluded, Lewen v Denda (C333/97) [2000] All E.R. (EC) 261 ECJ (6th Chamber) and Land Brandenburg v. Sass (C-284/02) [2004] ECR. I-11143 ECJ (1st Chamber) applied.

== Impact ==
The impact of this and other case law is that "there are now very little differences between Ordinary and Additional Maternity Leave."

Another impact of this case is that employers now have third party liability for sex discrimination in some situations.

The statutes were amended by Equality Act 2010 to created a protected class of pregnancy.

== See also ==
- Gender equality
- Human Rights Act 1998
- List of gender equality lawsuits
- UK employment discrimination law
- UK labour law
