= Allonby v Accrington and Rossendale College =

- European Court of Justice

Submitted 3 July 2001 Decided 13 January 2004
- Full case name: Debra Allonby v Accrington & Rossendale College, Education Lecturing Services, trading as Protocol Professional and Secretary of State for Education and Employment
- Case: C-256/01, [2004] IRLR 224, [2004] ECR I-00873
- CelexID: 62001J0256
- Case type: Reference for a preliminary ruling
- Chamber: Full court
- Nationality of parties: United Kingdom

Court composition
- Judge Rapporteur; Ninon Colneric
- Advocate General; Leendert Geelhoed

Legislation affecting
- Interprets 141 TEC

Allonby v Accrington & Rossendale College (C-256/01) is a European Union law case concerning the right of men and women to equal pay for work of equal value under Article 141 of the Treaty of the European Community.

== Background ==
Part-time lecturers at Accrington and Rossendale College did not have their contracts renewed. They were rehired through an agency, ELS, and said to be "self-employed independent contractors" under the new arrangement. They were denied access to the Teachers Superannuation Scheme. It was apparent that more of the part-time lecturers were women than the staff that remained under permanent contracts with the college.

They brought a claim for unfair dismissal and sex discrimination. The Tribunal held that while there was no sex discrimination, there was an unfair dismissal. Justice Lindsay in the Employment Appeal Tribunal held there were sound business reasons for the change, given that the college was in financial trouble, and therefore objective justification of the disparate impact on women and no discrimination.

== Judgment ==
=== Court of Appeal ===
The Court of Appeal referred to the European Court of Justice for advice on the application of Art. 141. It held that the EAT failed to consider whether there could ever be a justification if the primary aim of the dismissal was discriminatory. Lord Justice Sedley commented as follows, without saying whether the outcome would be favourable when it was reconsidered at tribunal, which would have to decide again on proportionate impact.

Once a finding of a condition having a disparate and adverse impact on women had been made, what was required was at the minimum a critical evaluation of whether the college's reasons demonstrated a real need to dismiss the applicant; if there was such a need, consideration of the seriousness of the disparate impact of the dismissal on women including the applicant; and an evaluation of whether the former were sufficient to outweigh the latter. There is no sign of this process in the tribunal's extended reasons.

=== European Court of Justice ===
The ECJ held that despite the contract saying they were self-employed, and despite national legislation under the Equal Pay Act 1970 applying only to employees, workers and those personally performing work (which may have brought the outside the Act's protection) the lecturers did fall within the Community definition of worker.

64. The term worker within the meaning of Article 141(1) EC is not expressly defined in the EC Treaty. It is therefore necessary, in order to determine its meaning, to apply the generally recognised principles of interpretation, having regard to its context and to the objectives of the Treaty.
65. According to Article 2 EC, the Community is to have as its task to promote, among other things, equality between men and women. Article 141(1) EC constitutes a specific expression of the principle of equality for men and women, which forms part of the fundamental principles protected by the Community legal order (see, to that effect, Joined Cases C-270/97 and C-271/97 Deutsche Post [2000] ECR I-929, paragraph 57). As the Court held in Defrenne II, cited above (paragraph 12), the principle of equal pay forms part of the foundations of the Community .
66. Accordingly, the term worker used in Article 141(1) EC cannot be defined by reference to the legislation of the Member States but has a Community meaning. Moreover, it cannot be interpreted restrictively.
67. For the purposes of that provision, there must be considered as a worker a person who, for a certain period of time, performs services for and under the direction of another person in return for which he receives remuneration (see, in relation to free movement of workers, in particular Case 66/85 Lawrie-Blum [1986] ECR 2121, paragraph 17, and Martínez Sala, paragraph 32).
68. Pursuant to the first paragraph of Article 141(2) EC, for the purpose of that article, pay means the ordinary basic or minimum wage or salary and any other consideration, whether in cash or in kind, which the worker receives directly or indirectly, in respect of his employment, from his employer. It is clear from that definition that the authors of the Treaty did not intend that the term worker, within the meaning of Article 141(1) EC, should include independent providers of services who are not in a relationship of subordination with the person who receives the services (see also, in the context of free movement of workers, Case C-337/97 Meeusen [1999] ECR I-3289, paragraph 15).
69. The question whether such a relationship exists must be answered in each particular case having regard to all the factors and circumstances by which the relationship between the parties is characterised.
70. Provided that a person is a worker within the meaning of Article 141(1) EC, the nature of his legal relationship with the other party to the employment relationship is of no consequence in regard to the application of that article (see, in the context of free movement of workers, Case 344/87 Bettray [1989] ECR 1621, paragraph 16, and Case C-357/89 Raulin [1992] ECR I-1027, paragraph 10).
71. The formal classification of a self-employed person under national law does not exclude the possibility that a person must be classified as a worker within the meaning of Article 141(1) EC if his independence is merely notional, thereby disguising an employment relationship within the meaning of that article.
72. In the case of teachers who are, vis-à-vis an intermediary undertaking, under an obligation to undertake an assignment at a college, it is necessary in particular to consider the extent of any limitation on their freedom to choose their timetable, and the place and content of their work. The fact that no obligation is imposed on them to accept an assignment is of no consequence in that context (see to that effect, in relation to free movement of workers, Raulin, paragraphs 9 and 10).

However, while they fell within the category of "worker", their claim failed because she could not point to a comparator that came from the same "single source".

Yet the ECJ stated that the rule that only "employees" could join the Teachers' Superannuation Scheme could well be incompatible with Article 141. The rule would be incompatible and should be disapplied if it shown to have an adverse impact on more women than men. If it is disapplied, it is not necessary for the claimant to point to a comparator of the opposite sex working for the same employer who has been adversely affected by the rule.

== See also ==
- UK employment equality law
- United Kingdom employment equality law
- Gender equality
- List of gender equality lawsuits
