= Lexecon Inc. v. Milberg Weiss Bershad Hynes & Lerach =

- Supreme Court of the United States

Argued November 10, 1997 Decided March 3, 1998
- Full case name: Lexecon Inc. v. Milberg Weiss Bershad Hynes & Lerach
- Citations: 523 U.S. 26 (more) 118 S. Ct. 956; 140 L. Ed. 2d 62

Case history
- Prior: Defense verdict upheld by the Ninth Circuit

Holding
- A district court conducting coordinated pretrial proceedings in multi-district litigation may not reassign a transferred case to itself for trial

Court membership
- Chief Justice William Rehnquist Associate Justices John P. Stevens · Sandra Day O'Connor; Antonin Scalia · Anthony Kennedy; David Souter · Clarence Thomas; Ruth Bader Ginsburg · Stephen Breyer

Case opinion
- Majority: Souter, joined by unanimous (except Scalia did not join Part II—C)

Laws applied
- 28 U.S.C. § 1407(a)

Lexecon Inc. v. Milberg Weiss Bershad Hynes & Lerach, 523 U.S. 26 (1998), was a United States Supreme Court case in which the Court unanimously held that a district court conducting coordinated pretrial proceedings in multiple cases by designation of the Judicial Panel on Multidistrict Litigation under 28 U.S.C. § 1407(a) has no authority to reassign a transferred case to itself for the actual trial of the case. The Court's decision overturned numerous lower-court decisions upholding what had become a common practice in multi-district cases.

== Background ==
The case originated when Lexecon Inc., a consulting firm that provided expert services to defense lawyers in securities cases, and Lexecon's principal, Daniel Fischel, sued the Milberg Weiss law firm in the United States District Court for the Northern District of Illinois in Chicago. The suit alleged defamation and other torts arising from allegations that Milberg Weiss had made against Lexecon concerning Lexecon's work for lawyers representing Lincoln Savings Bank.

Many other lawsuits had been filed in federal courts arising from disputes involving the collapse of Lincoln Savings and Loan Association. The Judicial Panel for Multi-District Litigation had previously directed that all these cases be transferred to the United States District Court for the District of Arizona in Phoenix for coordinated pre-trial proceedings, pursuant to the multi-district litigation statute, 28 U.S.C. § 1407. While the case was pending in Phoenix, Milberg Weiss moved that the case be transferred to Phoenix for purposes of the trial itself. Lexecon objected, arguing that the statute allowed for only pre-trial proceedings, not the actual trial, to be held in the "transferee" district and that it was entitled to have the trial in its chosen forum of Chicago.

The district judge in Phoenix, John Roll, granted Milberg Weiss's motion to transfer the case to himself, relying on a series of decisions from courts around the country that had approved of such "self-transfers" by judges hearing multi-district actions. The case went to trial before a jury in Phoenix, which decided in Milberg Weiss's favor.

On appeal to the United States Court of Appeals for the Ninth Circuit, Lexecon challenged, among other things, the propriety of the District Court's transfer order. The Court of Appeals rejected the appeal and Lexecon then sought review by the Supreme Court. While Lexecon's petition for certiorari was pending, law professor Charles Alan Wright, a leading authority on federal civil practice and procedure, filed an unusual amicus curiae brief on his own behalf, supporting Lexecon's position and opining that the multi-district litigation statute had been misinterpreted to authorize "self-transfers" for more than twenty years. The Supreme Court agreed to hear the case.

== Opinion of the Court ==
In an opinion authored by Associate Justice David H. Souter, the Supreme Court reversed the Ninth Circuit and held that under the multi-district litigation statute, the transfer of an action for coordinated multidistrict pretrial proceedings did not authorize the transferree judge to transfer the case to himself or herself for the actual trial. Rather, the statute requires that when all pretrial proceedings are completed, the action must be sent back ("remanded") for trial in the district where it was originally filed. Therefore, the jury trial of Lexecon's claims against Milberg Weiss should have taken place in Chicago rather than Phoenix, and the verdict rendered in Phoenix was invalid.

The Court also rejected Milberg Weiss's argument that even if the jury trial had taken place in the wrong venue, this was a harmless error that should not result in reversal. The Court concluded that trying a case in the wrong district, over a party's express objection, was not harmless.

Justice Souter's opinion spoke for a unanimous Court, except that Justice Antonin Scalia did not join in a portion of the opinion that addressed the legislative history of Section 1407.

== Aftermath ==
After the Supreme Court remanded the Lexecon case, it was transferred back to the Northern District of Illinois for trial. The case was retried before a jury in Chicago, which decided in favor of plaintiffs Lexecon and Fischel and awarded them $45 million in compensatory damages. The case then settled for a total of $50 million before the jury could decide whether to also award punitive damages.
