= Chrapliwy v. Uniroyal, Inc. =

1982 US labor law decision

Chrapliwy v. Uniroyal
- Court: United States Court of Appeals for the Seventh Circuit
- Full case name: Alta Chrapliwy, et al. v. Uniroyal Inc.
- Argued: October 1, 1981
- Decided: February 16, 1982
- Citations: 670 F.2d 760; 28 Fair Empl. Prac. Cas. (BNA) 19; 28 Empl. Prac. Dec. (CCH) ¶ 32,459

Case history
- Prior history: Award of attorney's fees to Plaintiff, 509 F. Supp. 442 (N.D. Ind. 1981)
- Subsequent history: Cert. denied, 461 U.S. 956 (1983)

Holding
- Reasonable attorney's fees are recoverable for time spent persuading the Federal Government to debar a defendant from its contracts when engaging in discriminatory practices. Reasonable attorney's fees are to be determined by the plaintiff's attorneys' rates, not by customary rates of attorneys in the locality in which the district court sits. Reasonable attorney's fees for risks of litigation and quality or representation are recoverable.

Court membership
- Judges sitting: Walter J. Cummings, Jr., Thomas E. Fairchild, Wesley E. Brown (Senior District Judge, D. Kan.)

Case opinions
- Majority: Fairchild, joined by a unanimous court

Laws applied
- Title VII of the Civil Rights Act of 1964

Chrapliwy v. Uniroyal, Inc., 670 F.2d 760 (7th Cir. 1982) is a US labor law decision of the U.S. Seventh Circuit Court of Appeals concerning the award of attorney's fees in a discrimination lawsuit. The facts of the case involved allegedly discriminatory practices in violation of Title VII of the Civil Rights Act of 1964. The litigants of the case settled in favor of the plaintiffs, but brought the issue of reasonable attorney's fees to the district court.

The Uniroyal company was a massive global business by the 1960s. Its origins trace back to the U.S Rubber Company, founded in Connecticut in the 1890s.

== Facts ==
During the late 1960s, Uniroyal was ramping down on shoe production, which was leading to layoffs. Shoe production at the Uniroyal's Mishawaka plant was largely staffed by women.

In summary, the company was threatening jobs of a large number of women while preventing them from pursuing positions in other departments. And so, led by Alta Chrapliwy, female workers at the plant filed with the Equal Employment Opportunity Commission (EEOC). Ultimately the EEOC issued a right-to-sue letter and set into motion a years-long process of investigations, filings, inspections, and courtroom maneuvers.

The women received compensation in the end.

== See also ==
- US labor law
- Gender equality
- List of gender equality lawsuits
