= Phyllis Graber =

American tennis player

Phyllis Graber, also known as Phyllis Graber Jensen, is a former American tennis player.

== Tennis career ==
Phyllis wanted to play tennis at Jamaica High School, but there was no girls' tennis team there. She requested to be a player on the boys' tennis team, but girls were not allowed in boys' sports under New York City Board of Education rules. Therefore, she filed a complaint with the New York City Commission on Human Rights, then chaired by civil rights leader and future congresswoman Eleanor Holmes Norton. Ira Glasser worked with her on this matter. In September 1970 Phyllis made her case before the New York City Commission on Human Rights, and in February 1971, the New York City Board of Education voted to allow boys to compete with girls in non-contact sports. The only vote against this was the vote of Mary Meade, the only woman on the Board at the time; Meade was notable as having been the first woman to become principal of any coeducational high school in New York City, when she became principal of Tottenville High School in 1937. Phyllis then joined the tennis team in 1971, becoming the first officially sanctioned female member of a formerly all-male high school varsity tennis team in New York City.

She also played on the women's tennis team at Cornell University.

== Other work ==
Phyllis worked as a staff photographer for the Boston Herald from 1984 to 1992 and is currently employed by Bates College as director of photography and video for the school's communications office. From August to October 2021, the Maine Jewish Museum exhibited "Shalom, Sisters," a selection of her photos highlighting Jewish women in Maine.

== Personal life ==
Phyllis lives with her husband in Maine.

== In popular culture ==
As noted by The New York Times, the book Radical Play: Revolutionizing Children’s Toys in 1960s and 1970s America (2023) "traces a direct line from the Graber case to the emergence of an androgynously named teenage doll, Dusty, introduced as an anti-Barbie by the Kenner toy company in 1974." A version of the Dusty doll could play tennis.
