= Thibaudeau v Canada =

- Supreme Court of Canada

Hearing: 4 October 1994 Judgment: 25 May 1995
- Full case name: Her Majesty The Queen v Suzanne Thibaudeau
- Citations: [1995] 2 SCR 627
- Docket No.: 24154
- Prior history: APPEAL from Thibaudeau v. M.N.R., 1994 CanLII 3494 (3 May 1994)
- Ruling: Appeal allowed

Court membership
- Chief Justice: Antonio Lamer; Puisne Justices: Gérard La Forest, Claire L'Heureux-Dubé, John Sopinka, Charles Gonthier, Peter Cory, Beverley McLachlin, Frank Iacobucci, John C. Major

Reasons given
- Majority: Iacobucci and Cory JJ
- Concurrence: Gonthier J
- Concurrence: Sopinka J, joined by La Forest J
- Dissent: McLachlin J
- Dissent: L'Heureux-Dubé J
- Lamer CJ and Major J took no part in the consideration or decision of the case.

Thibaudeau v Canada, [1995] 2 SCR 627 was one of a trilogy of equality rights cases published by a divided Supreme Court of Canada in the spring of 1995. The Court held that the provisions of the Income Tax Act requiring an ex-wife to include among her taxable income amounts received from ex-husband as alimony for maintenance of children is not a violation of the ex-wife's equality rights under Section 15 of the Canadian Charter of Rights and Freedoms.

== See also ==
- List of gender equality lawsuits
- List of Supreme Court of Canada cases (Lamer Court)
