= Wal-Mart Stores, Inc. v. Dukes =

2011 United States Supreme Court case

Wal-Mart v. Dukes
- Supreme Court of the United States

Argued March 29, 2011 Decided June 20, 2011
- Full case name: Wal-Mart Stores, Inc., Petitioner v. Betty Dukes, et al.
- Docket no.: 10-277
- Citations: 564 U.S. 338 (more) 131 S. Ct. 2541; 180 L. Ed. 2d 374

Case history
- Prior: District Court granted plaintiffs' motion for class certification, 222 F.R.D. 137 (N.D. Cal. 2004); appeals court affirmed, 509 F.3d 1168 (9th Cir. 2007), and affirmed en banc, 603 F.3d 571 (9th Cir. 2010); cert. granted, 2010 WL 3358931.

Holding
- Plaintiffs failed to show that their proposed class shares a common question of law or fact required under Rule 23(a). In addition, claims for monetary relief are not eligible for class certification under Rule 23(b)(2).

Court membership
- Chief Justice John Roberts Associate Justices Antonin Scalia · Anthony Kennedy; Clarence Thomas · Ruth Bader Ginsburg; Stephen Breyer · Samuel Alito; Sonia Sotomayor · Elena Kagan

Case opinions
- Majority: Scalia, joined by Roberts, Kennedy, Thomas, Alito; Ginsburg, Breyer, Sotomayor, Kagan (Parts I and III)
- Concur/dissent: Ginsburg, joined by Breyer, Sotomayor, Kagan

Wal-Mart v. Dukes, 564 U.S. 338 (2011), was a United States Supreme Court case in which the Court ruled that a group of roughly 1.5 million women could not be certified as a valid class of plaintiffs in a class action for employment discrimination against Walmart. Lead plaintiff Betty Dukes, a Walmart employee, and others alleged gender discrimination in pay and promotion policies and practices in Walmart stores.

The Court agreed to hear argument on whether Rule 23(b)(2) of the Federal Rules of Civil Procedure which provides for class actions if the defendant's actions make injunctive relief appropriate, can be used to file a class action that demands monetary damages. The Court also asked the parties to argue whether the class meets the traditional requirements of numerosity, commonality, typicality, and adequacy of representation.

The Supreme Court ruled unanimously that the class should not be certified in its current form but was only 5–4 on why so and whether the class could continue in a different form.

== Background ==
In 2000, Betty Dukes, a 54-year-old Walmart worker in Pittsburg, California, claimed sex discrimination. Despite six years of work and positive performance reviews, she was denied the training she needed to advance to a higher salaried position. Walmart argued that Dukes clashed with a female Walmart supervisor and was disciplined for admittedly returning late from lunch breaks.

In June 2001, the lawsuit began in a federal district court in San Francisco. The plaintiffs sought to represent 1.6 million women, including women who were currently working or who had previously worked in a Walmart store since December 26, 1998.

== Federal District Court ==
In June 2004, the federal district judge, Martin Jenkins, ruled in favor of class certification under Rule 23(b)(2) of the Federal Rules of Civil Procedure. Walmart appealed the decision.

== Court of Appeals ==
On February 6, 2007, a three-judge panel of the Ninth Circuit affirmed the district court's class certification. Judge Harry Pregerson wrote for the majority, which also included Judge Michael Daly Hawkins. Judge Andrew J. Kleinfeld dissented and criticized the majority's view of the class certification standards.

Walmart promptly filed for a rehearing and a rehearing en banc, contending that the majority committed legal error with regard to whether the grounds for class action certification had been met.

On December 11, 2007, the same Ninth Circuit panel withdrew its initial opinion and issued a subsequent, superseding opinion, which still permitted class certification. The panel dismissed the original petition for rehearing as moot in light of its superseding opinion, on the grounds that the revised opinion addressed the legal errors claimed in the petition, but Walmart was permitted to refile its petition. Among other changes to its original opinion, the Ninth Circuit altered its opinion with respect to the admissibility of expert testimony and the use of Daubert challenges during a motion for class certification. Walmart filed another petition for a rehearing en banc.

On February 13, 2009, the Ninth Circuit granted Walmart's petition for rehearing en banc on the class action certification. As a result, the December 2007 Ninth Circuit opinion was no longer effective.

On March 24, 2009, an en banc panel of eleven Ninth Circuit judges, led by Chief Judge Alex Kozinski, heard oral argument. On April 26, 2010, the en banc court affirmed the district court's class certification on a 6-5 vote, with Judge Michael Daly Hawkins writing the majority opinion and Judge Sandra Segal Ikuta writing the dissenting opinion.

Walmart's lead appellate counsel, Theodore Boutrous Jr., said in a statement that the decision violates "both due process and federal class action rules, contradicting numerous decisions of other federal appellate courts and the Supreme Court itself" and indicated that Walmart would appeal to the Supreme Court. Plaintiffs' counsel argued that "Wal-Mart is attempting to dismantle the Supreme Court's employment discrimination class action jurisprudence [that] would require the Court to overrule 45 years of civil rights and class action precedent."

== Supreme Court decision ==
On December 6, 2009, the Supreme Court agreed to hear Walmart's appeal as Wal-Mart v. Dukes. Oral argument for the case occurred on March 29, 2011.

On June 20, 2011, the Supreme Court ruled in Walmart's favor by saying the plaintiffs did not have enough in common to constitute a class. The Court ruled unanimously that because of the variability of plaintiffs' circumstances, the class action could not proceed as comprised.

Justice Scalia's majority opinion held that Rule 23(a)(2)'s requirement of commonality means that there must be a common question of law and fact, such that "determination of its truth or falsity will resolve an issue that is central to the validity of each one of the claims in one stroke". Thus, the Court ruled 5–4 that the case could not proceed as a class action.

== Legacy ==
The majority opinion was heavily criticized as unprincipled because its analysis of Rule 23(a)(2) "cannot be squared with the text, structure, or history" of that rule. By resorting to the analysis in a single law professor's law review article to interpret Rule 23(a)(2), Justice Scalia's opinion effectively rewrote Rule 23(a)(2) without admitting what it was actually doing, and without going through the conventional administrative process for rewriting court rules (that is, through the Judicial Conference of the United States). Justice Ginsburg's dissent pointed out that the majority opinion was improperly importing a Rule 23(b)(3) issue into the Rule 23(a)(2) analysis, thereby making commonality much harder to satisfy.

Critics of the opinion allege that the decision makes it incredibly difficult to certify a class without a prohibitive amount of work on the part of plaintiff attorneys. The requirement to look through the class to the merits requires an immense amount of discovery, which was not previously required.

Scalia's formulation made the commonality requirement for class certification very difficult to satisfy, especially in the employment context.

It can still be met by an employee who can point to a standard written policy where the merits issues can be easily proven or disproven "in one stroke", such as a formula for calculating overtime pay that is always too low and thus always illegal as applied to all employees. If the plaintiff can easily prove the fact and law of that issue in one stroke (e.g., the facts that the policy actually exists and its specific terms, and the relevant law governing how overtime pay should be calculated), they may proceed on behalf of a class.

In contrast, Scalia's test for commonality is virtually impossible to meet in employment discrimination cases. In the 21st century, it is extremely rare for someone to rise to a chief executive officer position in a large organization who is foolish enough to promulgate a standard written policy expressly directing adverse action against all persons who share a protected attribute. Thus, in large organizations, there will usually be too many decisionmakers and too much variability across their pay and promotion decisions to prove or disprove a companywide pattern of discrimination in one stroke. Conversely, in small organizations, it may be possible to show in one stroke that a single decisionmaker is or is not responsible for widespread discrimination, but then the proposed class may be too small to meet Rule 23's requirement of numerosity.

== See also ==
- Criticism of Walmart
- Gender equality
- List of class action lawsuits
- List of gender equality lawsuits
- Mauldin v. Wal-Mart Stores, Inc.
