= Brooks v Canada Safeway Ltd =

- Supreme Court of Canada

Hearing: June 15, 1988 Judgment: May 4, 1989
- Full case name: Susan Brooks v. Canada Safeway Limited; Patricia Allen and Patricia Dixon and the Manitoba Human Rights Commission v. Canada Safeway Limited
- Citations: [1989] 1 S.C.R. 1219
- Docket No.: 20131
- Prior history: Judgment for Safeway in the Manitoba Court of Appeal
- Ruling: Appeal allowed; Bliss v. Attorney General of Canada overruled

Holding
- Denial of employee benefit to women on leave for pregnancy is discrimination.

Court membership
- Chief Justice: Brian Dickson
- Puisne Justices: Jean Beetz; William McIntyre; Antonio Lamer; Bertha Wilson; Gerald Le Dain; Gérard La Forest; Claire L'Heureux-Dubé

Reasons given
- Unanimous reasons by: Dickson
- Lamer took no part in the consideration or decision of the case.
- Le Dain did not participate in the final disposition of the judgment.

Brooks v Canada Safeway Ltd [1989] 1 S.C.R. 1219 is a leading Supreme Court of Canada decision on employer discrimination of pregnant employees. The court found that Safeway violated the provincial Human Rights Act by failing to provide equal compensation for those who missed work due to pregnancy. This decision overturned the controversial case of Bliss v. Attorney General of Canada, [1979].

In 1982, Susan Brooks, Patricia Allen, and Patricia Dixon were all part-time cashiers at Safeway who became pregnant. The Safeway insurance plan that provided benefits for loss of pay due to accident or sickness did not give full benefits for 17 weeks for those who were unable to work due to pregnancy. The three women brought claims against Safeway for discriminating on the basis of pregnancy for discrimination based on sex. The court held unanimously that the insurance policy was discriminating against pregnant women.

== See also ==
- Canadian labour law
- List of Supreme Court of Canada cases
