= Captain Tilly Park =

Public park in Queens, New York

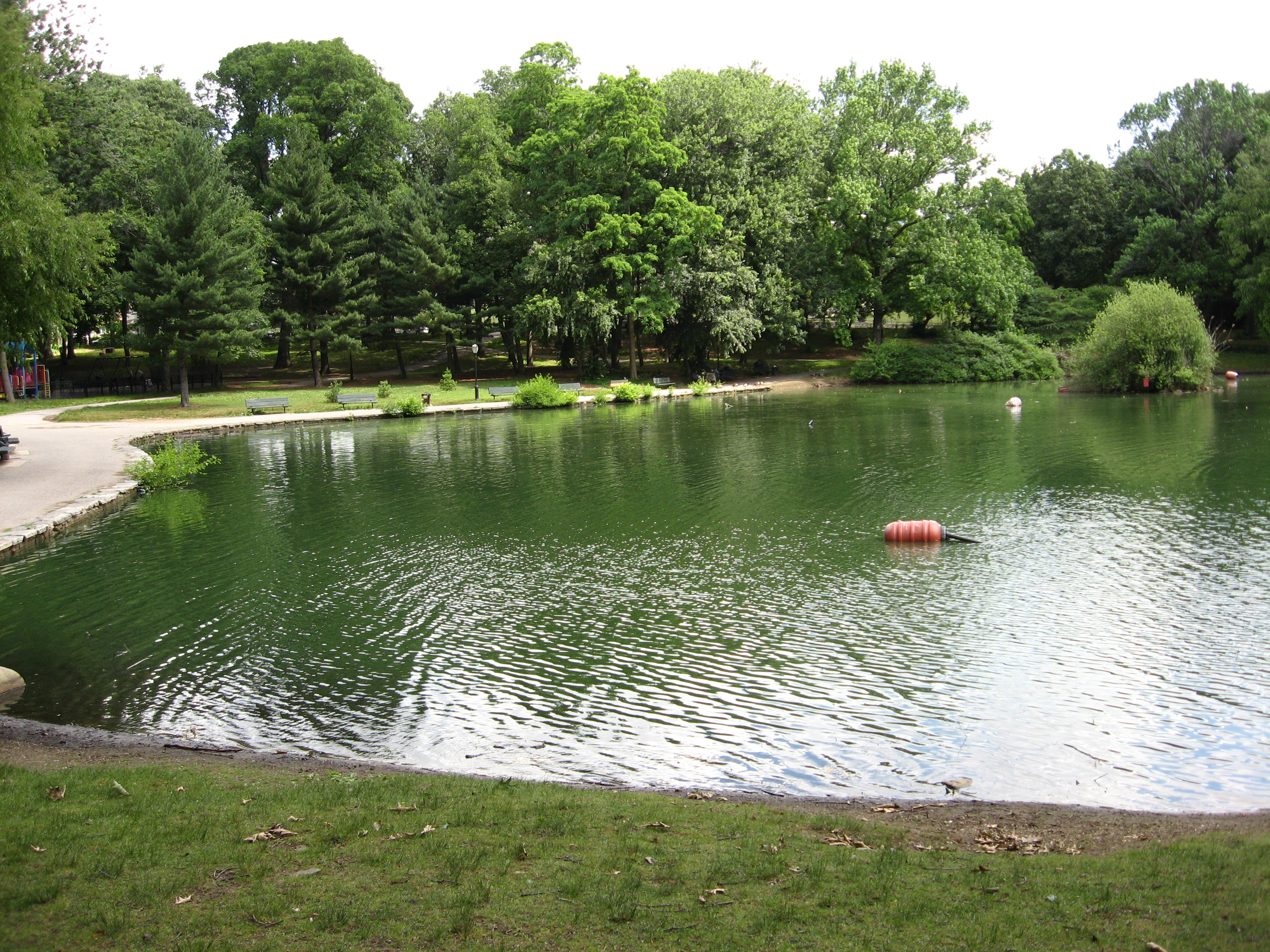
- Goose Pond, Captain Tilly Park
- Interactive map of Captain Tilly Park
- Location: Jamaica, Queens, New York, US
- Coordinates: 40°42′44″N 73°47′55″W
- Area: 9.16 acres (3.71 ha)
- Operator: New York City Department of Parks and Recreation
- Open: 6 a.m. to 1 a.m.
- Status: open

Captain Tilly Park is a 9.16-acre (3.71 ha) park in Jamaica Hills, Queens, New York, north of downtown Jamaica. It is bordered by 165th Street to the west, 85th Avenue to the north, Chapin Parkway and Gothic Drive to the northeast, and Highland Avenue to the south. The park consists of a kettle pond named Goose Pond, the only remaining kettle pond in Jamaica Hills.

The Tilly family, who originally owned the land, gave it to the New York City government for park operation in 1908. Originally known as Highland Park, and later as Upland Park, the park gained its current name in 1935 from Jamaica resident George H. Tilly, a member of the Tilly family who was killed in action during the Spanish–American War. After a period of decline in the late 20th century, Tilly Park and its pond were renovated several times. The park is operated by the New York City Department of Parks and Recreation.

== Description ==
Captain Tilly Park covers a 9.16-acre (3.71 ha) site in Jamaica Hills, an upper-middle-class residential area north of downtown Jamaica. The park is located within most of the block bounded by 165th Street to the west, 85th Avenue to the north, Chapin Parkway and Gothic Drive to the northeast, and Highland Avenue to the south. The Jamaica High School campus is located to the east, across Chapin Parkway. Captain Tilly Park is maintained and operated by the New York City Department of Parks and Recreation (NYC Parks).

A playground occupies the northeastern part of Captain Tilly Park. A set of restrooms is located at the southeastern section of the park.

Goose Pond, a 2-acre (0.81 ha) lake in the center of Captain Tilly Park, has been described as the park's "centerpiece". It is Jamaica Hills' only remaining kettle pond, a natural pond located in a depression caused by receding glaciers. Goose Pond is located at the north edge of the Harbor Hill Moraine, a terminal moraine across Long Island that was formed during the Wisconsin glaciation. The pond contains a bird sanctuary, "the smallest island in the smallest natural body of water" within New York City. In the early 20th century it was a popular ice-skating area during the winters. A natural spring under the pond was discovered to still be flowing in 1980, but during a renovation in the 1990s, Goose Pond was turned into an aerated lagoon with seven artificial jets.

== History ==
=== Early years ===
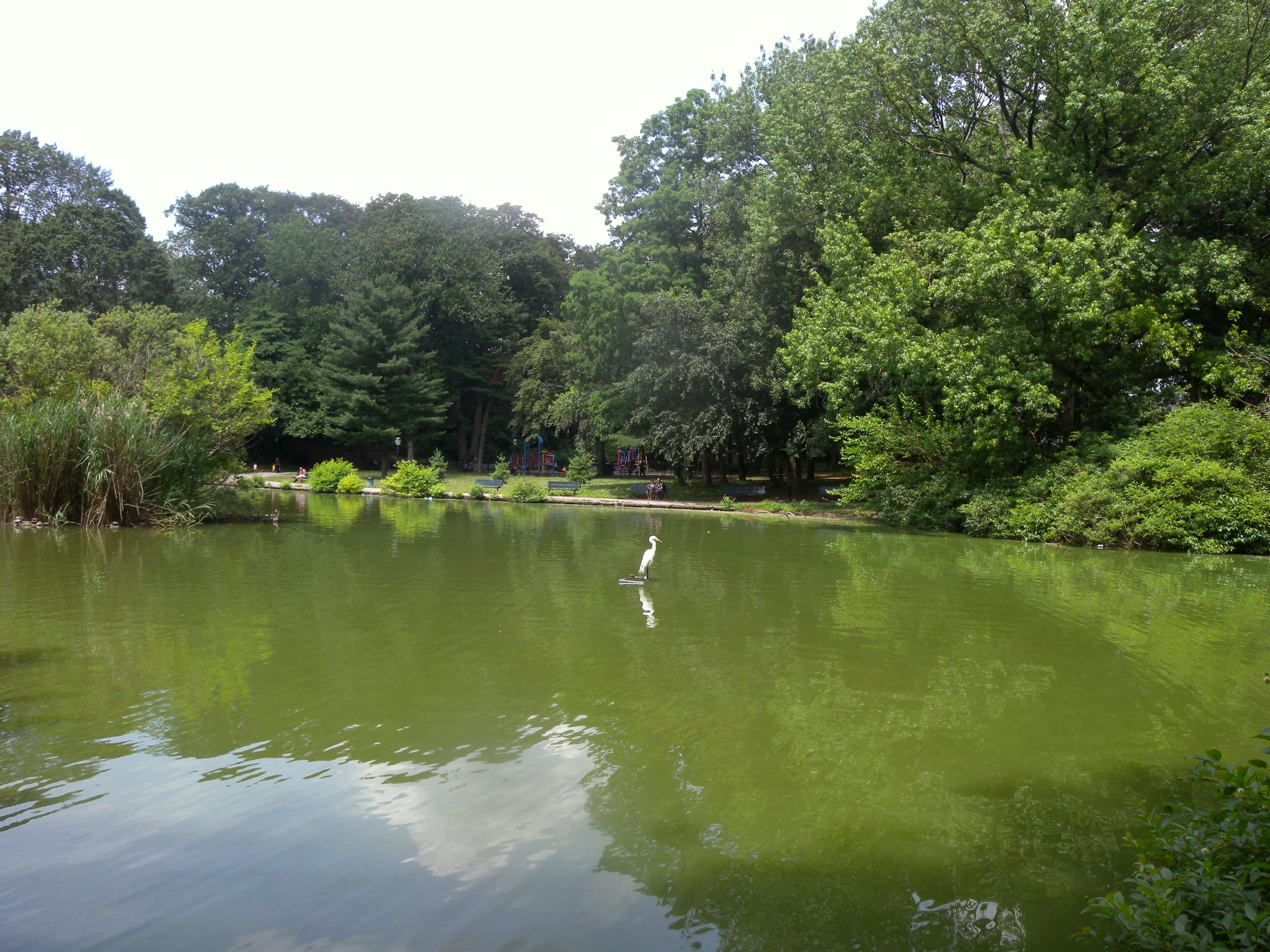
View across Goose Pond; the playground is in the background

What is now Captain Tilly Park was formerly located on land owned by the Tilly family. The park was originally called Highland Park. The Highland Park Society was founded c. 1891 to "provide a park and playground" for Jamaica. Initially the park land was worth $3,000, but by 1908 the park was thought to be worth ten times that amount. That year, Highland Park was transferred to city operation, with the Tilly family giving the land to the city for $1 on the condition that it would permanently remain as a park. The name was changed in 1912 to Upland Park because of possible confusion with the larger Highland Park in Brooklyn. The next year, the city approved the acquisition of 3.216 acres (1.301 ha) of land to expand Upland Park. Simultaneously, another 1 acre (0.40 ha) was given to the city by another landowner.

The city took property title to the park in 1925. The next year, Goose Pond was drained due to construction of Jamaica High School across the street. The city planned to expand the park in conjunction with the school's construction. However, community members objected to the excessive amounts that would be disbursed to affected landowners, since residents near the park would have to pay extra taxes. In 1938, after years of extended lawsuits, a judge reduced the disbursements for the affected parcels by more than 50%.

The city authorized the park's name to be changed to "Captain Tilly Park" in early 1935, and the renamed park was dedicated that August. The park's namesake, Captain George H. Tilly, had been killed in 1898 during the Spanish–American War. In conjunction with this renaming, the park was renovated with new benches and lamps, improved landscaping, and deepening of Goose Pond. At the time, the park comprised about 7.75 acres (3.14 ha). A Spanish-American War heroes' monument was erected in the park in 1941.

=== Restorations ===
During the late 20th century, many of the trees started to die. By 1971 the park was in a dilapidated condition, and NYC Parks had assigned $25,000 for park repairs. The city planned to restore the park in the mid-1970s, and had allocated $400,000 when the 1975 New York City fiscal crisis occurred. A federal grant toward restoration of Tilly Park was allocated in February 1978, increasing the renovation project's total allocation to approximately $573,000. By that December, community members alleged that NYC Parks had failed to take further steps to renovate Tilly Park, such as creating designs for the renovation. At the time, the pond had so little water that it could not be used for ice-skating for the first time in 75 years, and it posed a public health hazard. Furthermore, state assemblyman Arthur J. Cooperman had been advocating for Tilly Park's cleanup for the previous decade, and Queens Community Board 8's vice chairman of planning also said that the park's cleanup was a top priority. The park was finally renovated starting in 1980; the cleanup consisted of planting new trees, installing benches and lighting, cleaning the ponds, repaving the paths, and replacing the playground. The newly renovated park fell into disrepair, becoming "a haven for vandals and drug dealers", as the New York Daily News reported in July 1981.

In the late 1980s and early 1990s, Community Board 8 advocated for Goose Pond's restoration, which the board dubbed a top-priority project. At the time, the pond contained algal blooms caused by the stagnant water, which in turn killed its fish. The city allotted $455,000 for a cleanup in 1993, and work started in 1995. Subsequently, seven underwater air pumps were added in the pond, making it into an aerated lagoon. NYC Parks had placed 2,500 to 3,000 fish and other aquatic creatures in the pond in mid-1998. About six weeks later, 120 fish were found dead, all but one of which were goldfish, which had not been introduced into the pond by NYC Parks. The renovation was officially completed in early 1999 and ended up costing $700,000. However, residents reported increased algal blooms shortly afterward: though NYC Parks attributed the algal blooms and dead fish to the unusually warm weather, some residents demanded an investigation of the renovation project.

NYC Parks started a $2.4 million renovation of Captain Tilly Park in 2014. The first phase consisted of restoring paths and equipment, while the second phase included removing the pond's invasive species. In August 2020, NYC Parks planned to start rebuilding the park's restrooms.
