= Melvyn Weiss =

American lawyer

Melvyn I. Weiss
- Born: August 1, 1935; Bronx, New York
- Died: February 2, 2018 (aged 82); Boca Raton, Florida
- Occupation: Attorney

Melvyn I. Weiss (August 1, 1935 – February 2, 2018) was an American attorney who co-founded plaintiff class action law firm Milberg Weiss.

== Early life and education ==
Born in The Bronx, Weiss grew up in Hollis Hills, Queens and attended Jamaica High School. After graduating from City College of New York in 1956, he graduated three years later with a law degree from New York University School of Law. He served in the United States Army.

== Bribery charges and incarceration ==
At one point Weiss and his law firm dominated the market in securities class-action suits, in which investors who suffer losses typically claim that executives had misled them about a company's financial condition.

On March 20, 2008, Weiss announced through his attorney that he would plead guilty to making illegal client kickbacks in exchange for an 18- to 33-month prison sentence and fines and restitution of $10 million.

Prior to his sentencing for what he admitted was "wrongful conduct," and for which he was "profoundly sorry," supporters had flooded the Federal court with over 275 letters detailing Weiss' philanthropic history, including his pro bono work resulting in $6.25 billion in settlements he helped win for Holocaust victims. Both the Federal judge hearing the case and U.S. Attorney called the support for Weiss "unprecedented."

Weiss was sentenced to 30 months of incarceration on Monday June 2, 2008. Three other long-term Milberg Weiss partners — Steven Schulman, David Bershad and William Lerach — were similarly sentenced, with all released by 2010. Weiss served half of his sentence at the minimum security Federal Correctional Institution in Morgantown, West Virginia, with the remainder served under home confinement.

== Death ==
Weiss died on February 2, 2018, at his home in Boca Raton, Florida. He had been suffering from Amyotrophic lateral sclerosis (ALS).
