= Milberg =

US law firm

Milberg, PLLC
- Headquarters: New York City, United States
- Offices: U.S., UK, Germany, Portugal, and Netherlands
- Date founded: 1965
- Company type: Professional Limited Liability Company
- Website: milberg.com

Milberg, PLLC (formerly known as Milberg Coleman Bryson Phillips Grossman, PLLC, Milberg LLP, Milberg Weiss LLP and Milberg Weiss Bershad & Schulman LLP) is a U.S. plaintiffs' law firm. Founded in 1965, it is headquartered in New York City, and primarily focuses on class action litigation, with offices across the United States, and in London.

== History ==
In May 2004, Milberg was the largest plaintiff law firm in the United States, with over 200 attorneys, and had been responsible, in whole or part, for over 50 percent of all securities class action cases settled in 2002.

On May 18, 2006, the firm and two of its named partners, David J. Bershad and Steven G. Schulman (Schulman resigned in December 2006), were indicted by a grand jury in the United States District Court for the Central District of California on various counts, including racketeering, mail fraud, and bribery. The charges included claims that Milberg Weiss paid portions of its legal fees to plaintiffs in order to induce them to sue.

Following a significant downsizing in 2006 and 2007, the firm had 53 attorneys as of June 2008.

On June 16, 2008, U.S. prosecutors in Los Angeles dismissed the indictment against the firm, under a non-prosecution agreement, and a statement by the government that "no attorney currently a partner or associate with Milberg LLP is criminally culpable" with respect to conduct charged in the indictment. Milberg agreed to pay $75 million to settle the charges. However, four longtime Milberg Weiss partners—Steven Schulman, David Bershad, William Lerach, and Melvyn Weiss—pleaded guilty to federal charges related to the kickback scheme. Weiss received a 30-month sentence and $10 million in fines and restitution. Lerach was sentenced to two years in prison, probation, a $250,000 fine, and community service. Bershad serviced six months and forfeited $7.75 million. All were released by early 2010.

In 2018, Milberg merged with Sanders Philips Grossman, a mass tort firm known for its class action lawsuits against pharmaceutical companies, to form Milberg Tadler Phillips Grossman. In 2019, former partner Steven Schulman sued the firm, and settled.

In 2021, Milberg Phillips Grossman LLP partnered with Greg Coleman Law PC and Whitfield Bryson LLP to form Milberg Coleman Bryson Phillips Grossman, PLLC. The firm opened its first international office in the United Kingdom in 2019. Milberg London was ranked as Band 2 in Chambers and Partners’ category of ‘Group Litigation: Claimant’ in 2023.

== Notable cases ==
Melvyn Weiss convinced his partner, Lawrence Milberg, to fund class-action securities litigation against Dolly Madison Industries. Dolly Madison had acquired at least 30 companies over an 18-month period and was allegedly facilitating these deals by falsifying its balance sheet to artificially increase its stock price. Weiss and Milberg thought they could win a large payout from Dolly Madison's accounting firm, Touche Ross and Co., a big eight firm in the 1960s. Like most defendants in class actions, Dolly Madison delayed as long as possible and the case did not go to trial until 1973. Shortly before a verdict was rendered Touche settled for $2 million, resulting in a $500,000 fee for Milberg.

Other early cases included the Ninth Circuit decision in Blackie v. Barrack in 1975, which established the fraud-on-the-market doctrine for securities fraud actions; the Firm's co-lead counsel position in the In re Washington Public Power Supply System (WPPSS) Securities Litigation, a seminal securities fraud action in the 1980s in terms of complexity and amounts recovered; the representation of the Federal Deposit Insurance Corp. in a year-long trial to recover banking losses from a major accounting firm, leading to a precedent-setting global settlement; attacking the Drexel-Milken "daisy chain" of illicit junk-bond financing arrangements with numerous cases that resulted in substantial recoveries for investors; and representing life insurance policyholders defrauded by "vanishing premium" and other improper sales tactics and obtaining large recoveries from industry participants. Milberg's attorneys also argued another important case in 2007 before the high court in Tellabs Inc. v. Makor Issues & Rights Ltd.

On April 15, 2021, Milberg received a $11.1 million verdict on behalf of client Scott Kingston, who alleged IBM wrongfully terminated him after raising claims of racial bias in the treatment of his subordinates. The award was recognized as one of the top-ten verdict of the year in Top Verdict's Labor & Employment Category.

In May 2025, Milberg filed a class-action lawsuit against Coinbase for a data breach affecting nearly 70,000 of its customers. The cryptocurrency exchange estimates that the breach may cost as much as "$400 million in reimbursements, legal costs, and security upgrades."

== Offices ==
The firm's offices are located in New York, London, California, Georgia, Mississippi, Washington, Tennessee, Florida, North Carolina, South Carolina, Kentucky, Louisiana, and Puerto Rico.

== See also ==
- Lexecon Inc. v. Milberg Weiss Bershad Hynes & Lerach
- Mauldin v. Wal-Mart Stores, Inc.
