= Peter Afflerbach =

American literacy academic

- Born: October 28, 1956 (age 69); Queens, New York City, New York, U.S.

Academic background
- Education: University at Albany, SUNY

Academic work
- Discipline: Literacy, Education
- Institutions: University of Maryland, College Park

Peter Afflerbach (born October 28, 1956) is an American educator and researcher specializing in literacy, reading assessment, and reading comprehension. He is Professor Emeritus of Education at the University of Maryland, College Park, where he contributed to the study and teaching of reading strategies and individual differences in reading.

== Early life and education ==
Peter Afflerbach was born on October 28, 1956, in Queens, New York City. He attended public schools in New York City and later earned his doctorate in reading from the University at Albany, SUNY, where he focused on reading comprehension strategies and assessment.

== Teaching career ==
Before transitioning to academia, Afflerbach worked as a teacher in various roles, including as a Chapter 1 remedial reading teacher, a middle school reading and writing teacher, and a high school English teacher.

== Academic career ==
Afflerbach joined the faculty of the University of Maryland, College Park, where he served as a professor in the Department of Teaching and Learning, Policy and Leadership. His research interests include:

- Individual differences in reading
- Reading comprehension strategies and processes
- Reading in Internet and hypertext environments
- Reading assessment
- Mindfulness in reading

Afflerbach was a founding editor of the journal Metacognition and Learning and has published in both theoretical and practical journals.

== Contributions to literacy research ==
Afflerbach's served on several National Academy of Education and National Academy of Sciences committees focused on literacy and assessment. He contributed to the National Assessment of Educational Progress (NAEP), serving on its 2025 Reading Framework Development Committee and other related committees.

== Honors and recognition ==
- Inducted into the International Literacy Association’s Reading Hall of Fame (2009)
- Fellow of the American Educational Research Association (AERA)

== Publications ==
His works include:

- Understanding and Using Reading Assessment, K–12
- Teaching Readers (Not Reading): Moving Beyond Skills and Strategies to Reader-Focused Instruction
- Fostering Metacognitive and Independent Readers

== Personal life ==
Peter Afflerbach resides in San Francisco, California, following his retirement.
