= List of class-action lawsuits =

This page has a list of lawsuits brought as class actions.

== Class action lawsuits ==
Lawsuit	Subject of lawsuit	Court of decision	Year of decision
Alperin v. Vatican Bank	conversion, unjust enrichment, restitution, the right to an accounting, human rights violations and violations of international law	U.S. Court of Appeals for the Ninth Circuit	
In re American Realty Capital Properties, Inc. Litigation	violations of Section 11 of the Securities Act of 1933	U.S. District Court for the Southern District of New York	
Anderson v. Jackson	demolition of public housing damaged by Hurricane Katrina	United States Court of Appeals for the Fifth Circuit	2009
Burnett v. National Association of Realtors	conspiracy among real estate agents to inflate fees paid by home sellers	United States District Court for the Western District of Missouri	2023
Cobell v. Salazar	Indian trust assets	United States District Court for the District of Columbia	2009
Collins v. United States	honorable discharge under "Don't ask, don't tell"	United States Court of Federal Claims	2013
Conant v. McCaffrey	right to recommend medical marijuana	United States district court	
Daniels v. City of New York	racial profiling and unlawful stop and frisk		
De Beers Diamonds Antitrust Litigation		U.S. District Court for the District of New Jersey	
Doe v. Chiquita Brands International	funding and arming known terrorist organizations		
Dukes v. Wal-Mart Stores	discriminating against women in promotions, pay, and job assignments	United States Supreme Court	2011
Fraley v. Facebook, Inc.	misappropriation of users' names and likenesses	United States District Court for the Northern District of California	
Gonzalez v. Abercrombie & Fitch Stores	racial and gender discrimination in employment and marketing		
Gratz v. Bollinger	undergraduate affirmative action admissions policy too mechanistic in its use of race as a factor in admissions	Supreme Court of the United States	2003
Greek Cypriots v. TRNC and HSBC Bank USA	denial of access to land and property	United States District Court for the District of Columbia	
GM Instrument Cluster Settlement	owners of vehicles with faulty instrument clusters receive "special coverage"	U.S. District Court in Seattle	2008
Hepting v. AT&T	surveillance of telecommunications		
James v. Meow Media	video game responsibility for murders		
Jenson v. Eveleth Taconite Co.	sexual harassment, abusive language, threats, stalking and intimidation		
Jewel v. NSA	surveillance		2010
Lane v. Facebook, Inc.	internet privacy and social media	United States District Court for the Northern District of California	2010
Luévano v. Campbell	racial bias in written test for employment		
Madrigal v. Quilligan	involuntary sterilization		
Mauldin v. Wal-Mart Stores	health insurance not covering prescription contraceptives	United States District Court for the Northern District of Georgia	
Mochizuki v. United States	forcible kidnapping and imprisonment		
Morgan v. Hennigan	racial segregation and school busing		
Nasdaq Market Makers Antitrust Litigation	stock market collusion		
National Federation of the Blind v. Target Corporation	e-commerce website accessibility		
National Organization for Women v. Scheidler	anti-abortion activities	Supreme Court of the United States	1994
Payment Card Interchange Fee and Merchant Discount Antitrust Litigation	price fixing and other allegedly anti-competitive trade practices in the credit card industry		2012
Pigford v. Glickman	racial discrimination in its allocation of farm loans and assistance		1999/2010
Price v. Philip Morris, Inc	cigarette company advertising class action led by plaintiff's attorney Stephen Tillery resulted in $10.1 billion judgement	Madison County, Illinois	2003/2006
Ritalin class action lawsuits	promoting disorder ADHD to increase drug profits		
Robbins v. Lower Merion School District	charged schools secretly spied on students through surreptitiously and remotely activated webcams embedded in school-issued laptops the students were using at home; privacy rights	U.S. District Court for the Eastern District of Pennsylvania	filed 2010
Ruiz v. Estelle	prisoners' rights	United States District Court for the Southern District of Texas	1979
Scheidler v. National Organization for Women (2003)	anti-abortion activities	Supreme Court of the United States	2003
Scheidler v. National Organization for Women (2006)	anti-abortion activities	Supreme Court of the United States	2006
Shell Canada lawsuit	gasoline additive damaging fuel supply systems of cars		
Shyamala Rajender v. University of Minnesota	employment discrimination based on sex	United States District Court for the District of Minnesota	1980
Smiley v. Citibank	limiting credit card late fees and other penalties	Supreme Court of the United States	1996
Sullivan v. Zebley	Social Security regulation on determining disability for children	Supreme Court of the United States	1990
Swift v. Zynga	misleading advertising	United States District Court for the Northern District of California	
TNA Entertainment, LLC v. Wittenstein and World Wrestling Entertainment, Inc.	use of secret contact information to steal talent		
Turkmen v. Ashcroft	unlawful detainment		
Vroegh v. Eastman Kodak Company	false advertising, unfair business practices, breach of contract, fraud, deceit and/or misrepresentation		
World Jewish Congress lawsuit against Swiss banks	retrieving deposits from dormant bank accounts		2000

== Lawsuits related to class action ==
Lawsuit	Subject of lawsuit	Court of decision	Year of decision
AT&T Mobility v. Concepcion	contracts that exclude class action arbitration	Supreme Court of the United States	2011
Merrill Lynch, Pierce, Fenner & Smith, Inc. v. Dabit	SLUSA preempting state law class action claims	Supreme Court of the United States	2006
West v. Randall	required parties to class action	United States Court of Appeals for the First Circuit	

== See also ==
=== Class action lawyers ===
- Kristina Baehr (class action lawyer)
- William Lerach (class action lawyer)
- Tim Misny (class action lawyer)
- David I. Shapiro (class action lawyer)
- Paul Sprenger (lawyer representing employees in class actions)
- Harvey Thomas Strosberg (Canadian class action lawyer)
- Ted Wells (lawyer representing corporations in class actions)

=== Class action law firms ===
- Center for Class Action Fairness (law firm representing consumers in class actions)
- Edelson McGuire (law firm representing consumers in class actions)

=== Other persons involved in class actions ===
- William Hohri (class action lead plaintiff)
- Harry Kalven (American jurist, a pioneer in class action)

=== Legislation ===
- Personal Responsibility in Food Consumption Act (in the US)
- Securities Litigation Uniform Standards Act (in the US)

=== Other related topics ===
- 2007 National Football League videotaping controversy#Willie Gary lawsuit
- 2007 pet food recalls#Litigation
- 2008 Canada listeriosis outbreak#Class-action lawsuits
- 2009 Sidekick data loss
- 2009–2011 Toyota vehicle recalls#Litigation
- AOL search data leak#Lawsuits
- Aaron Broussard#Hurricane Katrina lawsuit
- Aeroplan#Class action lawsuit
- Agent Orange#U.S veterans
- Air France Flight 358#Passenger class action
- Airborne (dietary supplement)#Class actions and settlements
- Albany Law School#Controversy
- Algo Centre Mall#Lawsuit
- Amway#Class action settlement
- Apple Inc. litigation#Consumer class actions
- Audi TT#Lawsuits
- Aurora Bank#Lawsuits
- Banning Lyon#Class action lawsuit
- Benson & Hedges#Canadian class action lawsuit
- BigBand Networks#Class action lawsuit
- Billy Sullivan (American football)#Class action lawsuit
- Black Bike Week#Noise limit faces lawsuit
- Black Saturday bushfires#Lawsuits
- Blizzard Entertainment#StarCraft privacy lawsuit
- Bougainville Copper#US lawsuit
- Brazilian hair straightening#Class action lawsuits
- British American Tobacco#Canadian class action lawsuit\
- Brookfield Asset Management#Birch Mountain class action
- Buena Vista Rancheria of Me-Wuk Indians of California#History
- CEMA (record label distributor)#Lawsuit
- California Uninsured Patient Hospital Pricing Litigation
- Cameron Inquiry#Lawsuit
- Chester Upland School District#Class action lawsuit
- Chinese drywall#Lawsuits
- Cineplex Entertainment#Class action lawsuit
- Clayton College of Natural Health#Closure and lawsuit
- Click fraud#Lawsuits
- Criticism of Coca-Cola#Racial discrimination
- Criticism of Facebook#Class action lawsuit
- Criticism of eBay#eBay Motors class action lawsuit
- Deepwater Horizon litigation
- Denny's#Discrimination
- DirecTV#California class action lawsuit
- Dow Chemical Company#Nuclear weapons
- E18 error#Consumer response and class action
- Ed Fagan#2002 Slavery class action lawsuit
- Education Management Corporation#Securities fraud class action lawsuit dismissal
- Envision EMI, LLC#Lawsuit filed
- EverBank#Lawsuit
- Fastenal#Employee class-action controversy
- Foxtons#Foxtons USA
- Fuqi International#Class action lawsuit
- GM Instrument Cluster Settlement
- Global warming controversy#Litigation
- Google Book Search Settlement Agreement#Lawsuit
- Google Buzz#Legal issues
- Health effects arising from the September 11 attacks#Ground Zero workers' lawsuit
- Hitachi Deskstar#Lawsuit
- Honda Accord (North America eighth generation)#Brake wear class action lawsuit
- Hot Coffee mod#Civil class actions
- Howard Engle#Smoking class action suit
- Intelius#Class action lawsuits
- Japan Tobacco International#Canadian class action lawsuit
- Joe Arpaio#Melendres v. Arpaio racial profiling class-action lawsuit
- Judicial economy#Class action lawsuits
- Kaplan, Inc.#Class-action lawsuit
- Keele Valley Landfill#Resident class action lawsuit
- Kemper Corporation#Class-action lawsuit
- Kids for cash scandal#Victim lawsuits
- Kweku Hanson#Class action lawsuit against Ocwen Federal FSB
- Lead contamination in Washington, D.C. drinking water#Class-action lawsuit
- Long-term effects of benzodiazepines#Class-action lawsuit
- Lowe's#Lawsuits
- MMR vaccine controversy#MMR litigation starts
- Mannatech#Securities Exchange Act class-action lawsuit
- Match.com#Controversy
- McCullom Lake, Illinois#Class action lawsuit
- Medivation#Class action lawsuit
- Mercedes-Benz M156 engine#M156 lawsuit
- Metabolix#Lawsuit
- Money Mart#Lawsuits
- MyLife#Class-action lawsuit
- Myron W. Wentz#Shareholder lawsuit
- NebuAd#Class-action lawsuit
- No Fly List#ACLU lawsuit
- Oath of Citizenship (Canada)#Public action
- Pacific Seafood#Incidents
- Panera Bread#Lawsuits
- Pefloxacin#Current litigation
- PlayStation 3 system software#Class action suit filed over update 3.0
- PlayStation 3 system software#Class action suits filed over update 3.21
- PlayStation Network outage#Legal action against Sony
- Polybutylene#Class action lawsuits and removal from building code approved usage
- R2C2#Class action lawsuit
- Raytheon#Securities litigation
- Resignation of Shirley Sherrod#Class action lawsuit
- Ringtone#Lawsuits
- RiverCity Motorway#Lawsuit
- Shannon, Quebec#Cancer cluster (in Canada)
- Shell Oil Company#Polybutylene lawsuit
- Singapore Power#Lawsuit
- Sony BMG copy protection rootkit scandal#New York and California class-action suits
- Super Bowl XXXVIII halftime show controversy#Legal action
- System access fee#Class action lawsuit
- Water contamination in Crestwood, Illinois#Second class action lawsuit
- Water contamination in Crestwood, Illinois#Third class-action lawsuit
- TD Ameritrade#Security breaches
- Tekelec#Shareholder class action lawsuit
- Tenaha, Texas#Class action
- Texas City Disaster#Legal case
- Texas Youth Commission#ACLU lawsuit
- The Brick#Lawsuit
- The Chiari Institute#Lawsuits
- Thomas Jefferson School of Law#2011 class action lawsuit against TJSL
- Thomas M. Cooley Law School#Class action against Cooley
- Three Cups of Tea#Lawsuits
- TracFone Wireless#Class action
- True (dating service)#:0
- Turkish Republic of Northern Cyprus Representative Office to the United States#Legal action
- Tyrone Hayes#Class action lawsuit
- United Parcel Service#Employment actions
- Vartkes Yeghiayan#Class-action lawsuits
- Volkswagen emissions scandal#Legal and financial repercussions
- White House FBI files controversy#Judicial Watch lawsuit
- WinFixer#Class action lawsuit
- Xbox 360 technical problems#Lawsuit
- YTB International#Lawsuits
