= RRCC =

RRCC may refer to:

== Schools ==
- Rainy River Community College (RRCC), International Falls, Minnesota, USA
- Red River Community College (RRCC), Winnipeg, Manitoba, Canada
- Red Rocks Community College (RRCC), Colorado, USA

== Other uses ==
- Roanoke Region Chamber of Commerce (RRCC); see Roanoke Region
- Los Angeles County Registrar-Recorder/County Clerk (RR/CC)

== See also ==
- RC (disambiguation)
- R2C2
