= Gonzalez v. Abercrombie & Fitch Stores, Inc. =

- Court: United States District Court for the Northern District of California
- Full case name: Eduardo González, et al. v. Abercrombie & Fitch Stores, Inc., et al.
- Docket nos.: 3:03-cv-02817

Court membership
- Judge sitting: Susan Illston

The lawsuit González v. Abercrombie & Fitch Stores, Inc., No. 3:03-cv-02817, filed in June 2003, alleged that the nationwide retailer Abercrombie & Fitch "violated Title VII of the Civil Rights Act of 1964 by maintaining recruiting and hiring practice that excluded minorities and women and adopting a restrictive marketing image, and other policies, which limited minority and female employment." The female and Latino, African-American, and Asian American plaintiffs charged that they were either not hired despite strong qualifications or if hired "they were steered not to sales positions out front, but to low-visibility, back-of-the-store jobs, stocking and cleaning up." The case generated national press coverage, including a profile on the television program 60 Minutes.

== Settlement ==
In April 2005, the U.S. District Court approved a settlement, valued at approximately $50 million, which requires the retail clothing giant Abercrombie & Fitch to provide monetary benefits to the class of Latino, African American, Asian American and female applicants and employees who charged the company with discrimination.

The settlement, rendered as a Consent Decree, also requires the company to institute a range of policies and programs to promote diversity among its workforce and to prevent discrimination based on race or gender. Implementation of the Consent Decree continued into 2011. Abercrombie did not admit liability.

"The young men and women who applied to work at Abercrombie should have been judged on their qualifications, and not their skin color or gender. The class action settlement compensates class members for being subjected to the challenged practices and ensures that Abercrombie will improve its employment practices and diversity efforts nationwide," commented Kelly M. Dermody of Lieff Cabraser, which represented the plaintiffs along with the Mexican American Legal Defense and Education Fund, the Asian Pacific American Legal Center and the NAACP Legal Defense and Educational Fund, Inc.

== Criticism of Abercrombie's marketing materials ==
In 2008–10, during the six-year monitoring phase of the Consent Decree, a dispute arose regarding whether Abercrombie's in-store marketing material (predominantly comprising larger-than-life posters of mostly white models) deterred non-white applicants and/or encouraged managers to give preference to white applicants in hiring and promoting employees, and whether this violated the consent decree. Specifically, the decree required that "Abercrombie will reflect diversity, as reflected by the major racial/ethnic minority populations of the United States, in its marketing materials (taken as a whole)." Consent decree, section X.C.1, page 19. Plaintiffs and the EEOC brought a motion before the Special Master and then the court seeking to require Abercrombie to diversify its marketing, arguing that the marketing serves as a "hiring guide." The Special Master and the court denied the motion.

== See also ==
- List of class-action lawsuits
