= Decartelization =

Decartelization is the transition of a national economy from monopoly control by groups of large businesses, known as cartels, to a free market economy. This change rarely arises naturally, and is generally the result of regulation by a governing body with the authority to decide what structures are permissible.

A modern example of decartelization is the economic restructuring of Germany after the fall of the Third Reich in 1945.

To truly understand the term "decartelization" requires familiarity with the term "cartel". A cartel is a formal (explicit) agreement among firms. Cartels usually occur in an oligopolistic industry (oligopoly), where there are a small number of sellers, and usually involve homogeneous products (see Homogeneity and heterogeneity). Cartel members may agree on such matters as price fixing, total industry output, market shares, allocation of customers, allocation of territories, bid rigging, establishment of common sales agencies (sales agents), and the division of property or profits or combination of these. The aim of such collusion is to increase individual member's profits by reducing competition. Competition laws forbid cartels. Identifying and breaking up cartels is an important part of competition policy in most countries, although proving the existence of a cartel is rarely easy, as firms are usually not so careless as to put agreements to collude on paper.

== Historical background ==
Examples of alleged and legal cartels:

- American Telephone & Telegraph (AT&T) controlled all telephone systems in the United States via a network of subsidiaries, the Bell System, which was broken up in 1982.
- De Beers settled charges of price fixing in the diamond trade in the 2000s. (See De Beers antitrust litigation.)

== Debate ==
The general debate with decartelization is a national economy controlled by monopolies and cartels, versus a free market economy. With a free market economy, the pros are very clear. It encourages individual initiatives; it determines price of goods through competition, and motivates people to work towards financial independence. Most individuals would prefer a free market economy, where there are many buyers and sellers in each market, and the prices are determined based on competition alone. The problem is, it is not up to the individuals. In most cases of cartels, these secret arrangements are done "under the radar", and these major companies know how to cover their tracks. It is very difficult to prove that companies have formed a cartel; therefore it is very difficult to dismantle one.

In the case with the Third Reich in Germany, the people had no choice. During the war, there was a school called soziale Marktwirtschaft, the "social conscience free market". Members of this school hated totalitarianism and had propounded their views at some risk during the Nazis' rule. Wrote Henry Wallich, "During the Nazi Reich period the school represented a kind of intellectual resistance movement, requiring great personal courage as well as independence of mind." The school's members believed in free markets, along with some slight degree of progression in the income tax system and government action to limit monopoly.
