= GM Instrument Cluster Settlement =

The GM Instrument Cluster Settlement was a 2008 class action settlement awarded to owners of certain General Motors vehicles with allegedly defective speedometers. The settlement allows the owner or lessee to get their instrument cluster replaced under the terms of a special coverage adjustment to their factory standard warranty.

== Background ==
As early as 2005, the National Highway Traffic Safety Administration had received complaints concerning erratic speedometer and gauge readings from numerous makes and models of GM vehicles. No deaths or injuries were ever attributed to the erratic gauges, but owners of the vehicles felt the problem was a safety concern.

In 2007, Kevin Zwicker filed suit against General Motors in U.S. District Court in Seattle seeking three types of compensation:

1. Replacement of all speedometers on the affected models
2. Reimbursement for anyone who already paid to have a defective speedometer replaced
3. Reimbursement for anyone who paid speeding tickets and whose auto insurance rates rose due to a defective speedometer

John Hall filed a nearly identical suit in U.S. District Court in Oregon after paying the out of warranty repair cost to replace the instrument cluster in his 2003 GMC Envoy SLE. Both Zwicker and Hall were represented by Beth Terrell, an attorney with the Seattle law firm of Tousley Brain Stephens.

The case was assigned to U.S. District Judge John Coughenour, who decided to certify the lawsuit as a class-action.

== Terms ==
- If the vehicle is within 7 years or 70,000 miles (110,000 km) of the date it was first placed in service, GM must replace the instrument panel (parts and labor) for free.
- If the vehicle is within 7 years and between 70,001 miles (110,001 km) and 80,000 miles (130,000 km) of the date it was first placed in service, GM must replace the instrument panel (parts) for free. Any labor costs will be the responsibility of the vehicle owner.

Owners who paid for repairs to the speedometer before the class action settlement are eligible for reimbursement under the following terms:

- If the speedometer failed and the vehicle is within 7 years had less than 70,000 miles on it, upon proper proof of claim GM will reimburse the cost of repairs (parts and labor) up to the limit of what a GM dealership would have charged.
- If the speedometer failed and the vehicle is within 7 years and had more than 70,000 miles but less than 80,000 miles on it, upon proper proof of claim GM will reimburse the cost of the part only (no labor).

=== Vehicles covered (made 2000 to 2007) ===
- Cadillac Deville
- Cadillac Escalade ESV
- Cadillac Escalade EXT
- Chevrolet Avalanche
- Chevrolet Impala
- Chevrolet Silverado
- Chevrolet Suburban
- Chevrolet Tahoe
- GMC Sierra
- GMC Envoy
- Hummer H2

== See also ==
- Automobile products liability
- List of class-action lawsuits
