= California Uninsured Patient Hospital Pricing Litigation =

Series of lawsuits against hospital chains in California

In a series of class action lawsuits, uninsured patients alleged that several of California's largest hospital chains imposed exorbitant fees for medical care and engaged in price gouging. Under settlements reached in cases in 2006–2008, almost a million patients received refunds or bill adjustments, and millions more benefited from reduced prices for future medical care. These hospital cases returned almost $1 billion to patients.

Four of the class actions were brought against hospital chains: Scripps Health, John Muir Health, Sutter Health, and Catholic Healthcare West (two of the largest hospital chains in California whose cases were resolved earlier). The fifth action was brought against California Emergency Physicians (CEP) Medical Group, one of the state's largest providers of emergency medical care.

== Summary of individual hospital pricing cases ==
In re John Muir Uninsured Healthcare Cases

A class of nearly 53,000 uninsured patients who received care through John Muir Health alleged they were charged inflated prices and then subject to overly aggressive collection practices when they failed to pay.

The settlement approved in April 2008 reduced charges historically and prospectively, bringing prices to the levels that other payors paid or will pay for the same treatment. The settlement also addressed gaps in charity care (free or reduced care for low-income uninsureds) and limited collections practices. The class received refunds or bill adjustments of 40-50% off their bills from John Muir over a six-year period, at a value of $113 million.

Galicia v. Franklin/Franklin v. Scripps Health

A certified class of 60,750 uninsured patients who received care from the Scripps Health hospital system alleged that Scripps imposed excessive fees and charges for medical treatment. The final settlement approved in June 2008 reduced charges historically and prospectively, bringing prices to the levels that other payors paid or will pay for the same treatment. The settlement also addressed gaps in charity care (free or reduced care for low-income uninsureds) and limited collections practices. The class received refunds or bill adjustments of 35% off their bills from Scripps, at a value of $73 million.

Cincotta v. California Emergency Physicians Medical Group

A class of nearly 100,000 uninsured patients who received emergency room care from CEP Medical Group alleged they were charged excessive and unfair rates for medical treatment. CEP provides emergency room care at over 55 hospitals throughout California.

The settlement preliminarily approved in August 2008 provided complete debt elimination—100% cancellation of the bill—to uninsured patients treated by CEP during the 4-year class period. These benefits were valued at $27 million. In addition, the settlement requires CEP to maintain discount policies for all Charity Care Patients and limits CEP's collection practices.

Sutter Health Uninsured Pricing Cases

A class of uninsured patients treated at Sutter hospitals alleged that they were charged substantially more than patients with private or public insurance, and many times above the cost of providing their treatment. In December 2006, the Court granted final approval to a comprehensive and groundbreaking settlement of the action.

The settlement reduced charges historically and prospectively, bringing prices to the levels that other payors paid or will pay for the same treatment. The settlement also addressed gaps in charity care (free or reduced care for low-income uninsureds) and limited collections practices. The class received refunds or bill adjustments of between 25% and 45% off their prior hospital bills, at an estimated total value of $276 million. Through 2009, Sutter will maintain discounted pricing policies for uninsureds that will make Sutter's pricing for uninsureds comparable to or better than the pricing for patients with private insurance. In addition, the settlement requires Sutter to enhance its charity care policies and limit their collections practices that will protect uninsureds who fall behind in their payments.

Catholic Healthcare West Cases

A class of uninsured patients who received treatment at Catholic Healthcare West ("CHW") alleged that CHW charged excessive fees for treatment and services, at rates far higher than the rates charged to patients with private insurance or on Medicare.

The settlement approved in January 2007 reduced charges historically and prospectively, bringing prices to the levels that other payors paid or will pay for the same treatment. The settlement also addressed gaps in charity care (free or reduced care for low-income uninsureds) and limited collections practices. The class received refunds or bill adjustments of 35% off their bills from CHW, at a value of $423 million.

== Impact of the litigation ==
"At a time when there is a national crisis of uninsured people vulnerable to financial devastation due to their lack of health insurance, it is unconscionable for any hospital or medical group to price gouge," said Kelly Dermody of Lieff Cabraser, the San Francisco law firm that spearheaded the class action lawsuits uninsured patients. For her work in the Sutter Health case, California Lawyer magazine awarded Ms. Dermody a California Lawyer Attorneys of the Year (CLAY) award.

For years, health and consumer groups in California tried to generate media attention on the unfair pricing and collection practices of hospitals and other medical care providers and advocated for legislation that would have offered uninsured patients greater protection. Assembly Bill 774 was introduced to prevent hospital overcharging and other abusive collection practices. The legislation was opposed by the California Hospital Association. In 2004, Governor Arnold Schwarzenegger vetoed the bill, stating that voluntary guidelines adopted by hospitals to protect the uninsured were sufficient.

The California uninsured patient hospital pricing litigation demonstrated that the voluntary guidelines were not working and generated media coverage of the financial devastation suffered by uninsured patients. This provided momentum for a renewed effort to enact Assembly Bill 774.

As noted by Anthony Wright, Director of Health Access, the state's leading consumer health advocacy group, the class action settlements reached with Sutter Health and Catholic Healthcare West "prodded" the California Hospital Association to return to the negotiating table with healthcare advocates and ultimately support a revised version of Assembly Bill 774.

In 2006, the Legislature passed and the Governor signed Assembly Bill 774, adding section 127405 to the California Health and Safety Code. Among its provisions, the statute protects families under 350 percent of the poverty level from paying inflated hospital charges, beyond the rates hospital charge under the Medicaid or Medicare programs. All of the California Uninsured Patient Hospital Pricing Litigation resulted in enhanced charity policies that were more generous than required under Assembly Bill 774.
