= De Beers antitrust litigation =

Antitrust class action against De Beers

The De Beers diamonds antitrust class action sought to end an alleged 60-year conspiracy to fix the price of rough diamonds in the U.S. by the De Beers group of companies. The litigation includes several cases including Hopkins v. De Beers Centenary A.G., et al., No. CGC-04-432954, which commenced on July 24, 2004, and Sullivan v. DB Investments, No. 04-cv-02819, and earlier related cases that commenced in 2001. The oldest antitrust case against De Beers is known to have been filed by the United States Department of Justice in New York courts in 1945.

== Allegations ==
The complaints charged that De Beers created a global cartel in the markets of rough and polished diamonds, market share close to 90%, through aggressive management of supply and prices, and collusive agreements with competitors, suppliers, and distributors. This was a quintessential antitrust violation of the Sherman Act.

== Settlement agreement ==
In October 2005, the parties reached a preliminary agreement to settle the claims of all indirect purchasers nationwide, with Sullivan serving as the procedural vehicle for seeking court approval of the settlement, notice and claims administration. Working out the details took three years between Plaintiffs' Counsel and De Beers. In April 2008, the Court conducted a fairness hearing, and in May 2008, granted final approval to the settlement.

The settlement provided $295 million to purchasers of diamonds and diamond jewelry, including $130 million to consumers. In addition, De Beers consented to a historic injunction that prohibits De Beers from monopolizing the world supply of rough diamonds, and from fixing the price of polished diamonds. The injunction also required De Beers to submit to the continuing jurisdiction of the United States District Court for enforcement. Commenting on the case, plaintiff's counsel Eric B. Fastiff of Lieff Cabraser stated that De Beers' offer to settle “showed that our strategy was correct. If you put litigation pressure and represent your client vigorously, eventually a guilty defendant will recognize that it needs to resolve its problems.”

On May 21, 2012, the U.S. Supreme Court denied the final petition for review. Pursuant to an Order of the Court, Initial Distribution checks were mailed to Authorized Reseller Claimants on August 31, 2012. The remaining proceeds of the Reseller Subclass Net Settlement Fund were distributed to Authorized Reseller Claimants on March 15, 2013. As of November 24, 2015, distribution of settlement funds has been completed and the case is now closed.

== See also ==
- List of class-action lawsuits
