= Swift v. Zynga =

United States, District Court, California

- Court: United States District Court for the Northern District of California
- Full case name: Rebecca Swift v. Zynga Game Network, Inc. et al
- Started: November 17, 2009
- Decided: August 4, 2011
- Docket nos.: 3:09-cv-05443
- Citations: Dkts. 18, 23 (N.D. Cal. Nov. 2, 2010), C 09-05443 SBA, 805 F. Supp. 2d 904 (N.D. Cal. 2011)
- Transcript

Case history
- Prior actions: Petition to dismiss the case denied, November 15, 2010
- Subsequent actions: The pending motions to compel discovery, cross-motion to stay discovery, and motion to hear the cross-motion to stay on shortened time are DENIED AS MOOT.

Court membership
- Judges sitting: Saundra Brown Armstrong, Elizabeth D. Laporte

Case opinions
- Decision by: Elizabeth Laporte, Saundra Armstrong

Swift v. Zynga is a 2011 class action lawsuit filed in 2009, based on allegedly deceptive ads that ran in Zynga games on Facebook. A motion by Zynga to dismiss the case was denied by the United States District Court for the Northern District of California in November 2010.

== Factual background ==
Zynga is a developer of popular online games such as FarmVille, Mafia Wars, Yoworld and ZyngaPoker. These games allow players to spend virtual currency to take in-game actions and purchase virtual goods. Currency is metered out through the game itself, and additional currency can be purchased directly, or earned by completing special offers with Zynga and its business partners.

The plaintiff, Rebecca Swift, alleges that she played Zynga games and participated in multiple special offers run by Zynga's partner Adknowledge. In April 2009 she allegedly provided her cell phone number as requested by one of these offers, in order to be texted a code redeemable for YoCash, in-game currency in Zynga's YoVille! game. She subsequently received four charges of $9.99 billed to her cell phone from April 16, 2009, onward, without her knowledge or consent.

Additionally, on June 14, 2009, Rebecca signed up for a second special offer, a "risk-free Grean Tea Purity Trial." The offer promised YoCash in exchange for participation in the risk-free trial, and stipulated that the trial could be cancelled anytime within 15 days of sign-up. Rebecca provided her debit card number and was charged an initial $5.95 for shipping and handling. Ten days later she sent an email asking to cancel the subscription, after receiving a shipment of green tea pills and tea bags. On July 4 Rebecca received an email indicating she would be charged an additional $79.95, despite her request to cancel. She was unable to contact the sender by telephone, and on July 6 was billed for the $79.95 plus a foreign transaction fee. On July 20, she was billed again, resulting in total charges of $176.56.

== Procedural background ==
Rebecca Swift filed a putative class action on November 19, 2009, claiming Facebook, Zynga, and AdKnowledge profited from "highly misleading" ads. Outside experts initially voiced the opinion that both Facebook and Zynga would be immune to legal action under provisions of the Communications Decency Act (CDA). Swift withdrew her action against Facebook in January 2010, though court records showed that the case was dismissed without prejudice and could in theory be re-filed. A First Amended Complaint was filed by Swift on February 10, 2010, which claimed violation of the Unfair Competition Law, violation of the Consumers Legal Remedies Act, and unjust enrichment.

Both Zynga and AdKnowledge separately moved to dismiss the case on the grounds that Swift’s claims are barred by the CDA, but the motion was denied by the United States District Court for the Northern District of California in a November 3rd, 2010 ruling.

AdKnowledge separately claimed that Swift failed to sufficiently identify AdKnowledge's role in the alleged fraud. AdKnowledge also argued that Swift's unjust enrichment claim should be dismissed. Finally, AdKnowledge moved to strike Swift's class allegations. AdKnowledge's claim and both motions were denied.

== Court's reading of CDA immunity and reaction ==
In evaluating Zynga's motion to dismiss, the court looked to the Roommates.com ruling (521 F.3d at 1161-1162). Through the lens of that ruling, the court determined that Swift's allegations could, if proven, support the conclusion that Zynga was responsible for creating or developing the content at issue. Specifically, Swift asserts that the virtual currency offered in the ads is the most important "content" found within them, and that Zynga further contributed to their development by specifying the design, layout, and format of the offers.

When evaluating AdKnowledge's immunity claim, the court found that it was unable to determine whether it is entitled to CDA immunity, an evaluation which it judged to be a fact-based inquiry.

Several law blogs have remarked on the failure to dismiss for CDA immunity as a potentially far-reaching shift in the law, claiming that it marks a departure from standard case law and could require websites to take extra steps to ensure their immunity.

== Changes by Zynga ==
Zynga reacted to the broader "scam ads" controversy by removing all "offer" based advertising from its site in 2009. This action was taken after Swift experienced the allegedly fraudulent ads, but before the original complaint in Swift v. Zynga was filed. In January 2010, Zynga reinstated these offer-based promotions.

== See also ==
- List of class-action lawsuits
