= Shell Canada lawsuit =

The Shell Canada Lawsuit was a class action suit filed against Shell Canada Limited on July 18, 2003, on behalf of customers who purchased "Bronze" (regular-grade) gasoline products, to which Shell Canada added an "additive", between March 1, 2001 and April 15, 2002. This additive allegedly caused damage to the fuel supply system of many cars, most commonly of Acura, Chrysler, Dodge, Ford, General Motors, Hyundai and Volvo brands. While Shell Canada estimated that between 100,000 and 200,000 customers bought "Bronze" products during that period, it is unknown how many total vehicles were affected.

A settlement was reached on January 7, 2004, and was approved by the Superior Court of Quebec in June 2004. Under the settlement, Shell compensated people who owned or leased vehicles that were filled with at least C$100 worth of Shell branded gasoline between March 1, 2001 and April 15, 2002 and that experienced fuel pump or fuel sensor problems before July 31, 2002. Claims were able to be made under the class action until November 5, 2004.

There are three classes of claims and compensation:

- People who owned or leased 1996–2002 Chrysler vehicles (except Jeeps) were fully reimbursed for fuel pump and fuel sensor repairs and for eligible out-of-pocket expenses.
- People who owned or leased other 1996–2002 vehicles and who can establish that the fuel pump or fuel-sending unit had a particular residue on it were reimbursed for eligible repairs and out-of-pocket costs to a maximum of C$175.
- People who owned or leased pre-1996 vehicles and who can establish that the fuel pump or fuel-sending unit had a particular residue on it were reimbursed for eligible repairs and out-of-pocket expenses to a maximum of C$100.

== See also ==
- List of class-action lawsuits
