= Robert L. Lieff =

American lawyer

Robert Lieff
- Born: Robert L. Lieff; September 29, 1936; Bridgeport, Connecticut, U.S.
- Occupation: Lawyer

Robert L. Lieff (born September 29, 1936) is a plaintiff's lawyer and the founder of Lieff Cabraser in San Francisco, New York City, and Nashville.

== Early life ==
Lieff was born in Bridgeport, Connecticut, on September 29, 1936. He has resided in California since 1963.

== Education and early career ==
Lieff attended Cornell University and received a B.A. degree, then graduated from Columbia Law School in 1961. He earned a master's degree in business administration from the Columbia Graduate School of Business in 1962. He first worked as an attorney at Chadbourne & Parke, LLP in New York.

== Legal career ==
Lieff worked as an associate and then partner at the law firm of Belli, Ashe, Ellison, Choulos & Lieff from 1965 to 1972. After leaving the Belli Firm, he was the founder of Lieff Cabraser. Under his direction, Lieff Cabraser became one of the largest plaintiffs' firms in the world, with 150 lawyers and 200 employees in San Francisco, New York City, and Nashville. Lieff Cabraser was recognized by the National Law Journal as one of the top plaintiffs firms in the country for fourteen years running, one of only two such firms to be so honored. Lieff became "Of Counsel" to the firm in 2007.

== Personal ==
Robert Lieff and his wife Susan reside in Montecito, California, and Santa Ynez, California. They operate Robert Lieff Wines LLC at Lieff Ranch in Santa Ynez, California in Santa Barbara County.
