= Nasdaq Market Makers Antitrust Litigation =

Nasdaq Market-Makers Antitrust Litigation was a class-action lawsuit initiated in 1996 alleging collusion amongst Wall Street traders. The class action alleged that market makers on the Nasdaq set and maintained wide spreads pursuant to an industry-wide conspiracy. Litigation took nearly four years and was eventually settled for $1.027 billion, which was the largest antitrust recovery up to that point.

== See also ==
- Electronic communication network
- List of class action lawsuits
