= Collins v. United States =

Collins v. United States was a class-action lawsuit filed on November 10, 2010, against the United States in the United States Court of Federal Claims that ended in a settlement on January 7, 2013.

The lead plaintiff, former U.S. Air Force Staff Sergeant Richard Collins, was honorably discharged under "Don't ask, don't tell" (DADT) after nine years of service after two civilian co-workers saw him kissing his civilian boyfriend. Once discharged, Collins discovered that his separation pay was half that normally paid to servicemembers separated from the military under the designation "honorably discharged". The Department of Defense (DoD) had an established policy that provided that servicemembers honorably discharged receive half the normal separation pay if they were not eligible for reenlistment. Those discharged as homosexuals under DADT as well as those discharged for medical reasons were ineligible for reenlistment and therefore received half the standard separation pay.

On Collins' behalf, the ACLU and the Servicemembers Legal Defense Network filed requests for the revision of the policy with the DoD. When the DoD refused that request, Joshua Block of the American Civil Liberties Union, Laura Schauer Ives of the ACLU of New Mexico, and Sara Berger of Albuquerque, New Mexico, filed suit on November 10 and opened participation in the case to all veterans discharged under the policy since November 20, 2004.

On January 29, 2011, while detailing the repeal of DADT in accordance with the Don't Ask, Don't Tell Repeal Act of 2010, the DoD announced that those discharged under the policy would not receive any additional compensation and that their separation pay would not be adjusted. The ACLU expressed disappointment with the DoD's position.

Judge Christine Odell Cook Miller heard arguments in the case on September 22, 2011, two days after the end of the DADT policy. Justice Department lawyer L. Misha Preheim argued on behalf of the government that the Secretary of Defense has sole jurisdiction over back pay for discharged soldiers and that the courts cannot rewrite military regulations.

On January 7, 2013, the ACLU reached a settlement with the federal government. It provided for the payment of full separation pay to servicemembers discharged under DADT since November 10, 2004, who had previously been granted only half that. Under this agreement, some 181 were expected to receive about $13,000 each.

== See also ==
- Sexual orientation and the United States military
- Sexual orientation and gender identity in the United States military
- List of class-action lawsuits
