= Vroegh v. Eastman Kodak Co. =

Vroegh v. Eastman Kodak Company, et al. is a class action complaint that alleges that the defendants, "[i]n marketing, advertising and/or packaging their Flash Memory Cards and Flash Memory Drives, Defendants misrepresent the size of the memory storage contained in the Flash Memory Cards and Flash Memory Drives." The complaint accuses the defendants of "false advertising, unfair business practices, breach of contract, fraud, deceit and/or misrepresentation, and violation of the California Consumers Legal Remedy Act".

== Facts ==
The complaint, case number CGC-04-428953, was originally filed in Superior Court of the State of California for the county of San Francisco on February 20, 2004. The complaint was first filed as "Vroegh vs. Dane Elec Corp., USA, A Foreign Corporation et al." When Dane-Elec settled and was dismissed from the case on March 15, 2005, Eastman Kodak became the first defendant. Another plaintiff intervened in January 2004.

The complaint originally named the following companies as defendants:

- Dane-Elec Corp. USA
- Fujifilm USA, Inc.
- Eastman Kodak Company
- Kingston Technology Corporation
- Lexar Media, Inc.
- Memorex Products, Inc.
- PNY Technologies, Inc.
- SanDisk Corporation
- Verbatim Corporation
- Viking Components Incorporated
- And up to 200 defendants "to be named at a later date".

The gravamen of the complaint is the alleged loss in hard drive capacity that is caused by the difference between the measurements calculated using the binary prefix and SI prefix systems.

== Settlement ==
On August 16, 2006, there was a proposed final judgement on a proposed settlement and on November 1, 2006, LexisNexis reported in their "California Legal News" that the settlement agreement calls for $2.4M in attorney fees. The settlement was finally approved on or about November 21, 2006. The settlement provided for either a refund of 5% of the original purchase price or a 10% coupon on future purchases. The refund amount is in excess of the amount of memory that was allegedly missing. Accordingly, the settlement made available to class members refunds in excess of $100 million.

Five defendants, including Dane Elec, settled the case on a non-class basis. The other five defendants, Eastman Kodak Company, Fuji Photo Film U.S.A., Inc., Lexar Media, Inc., PNY Technologies, Inc., and SanDisk Corporation, settled on a class basis.

== Attorneys for the plaintiff ==
The law firm of Gutride Safier, LLP and Milberg Weiss, have been involved in other significant class action lawsuits in California from which they applied for significant fee payments. Such fee requests are often cited as unreasonable in that they call into question the true motivation of the attorneys, as was the case with these particular attorneys. Two of the most notable class actions brought by Gutride Safier are the Chavez v. Netflix class action that was settled (but is currently on appeal) when the defendants agreed to pay Gutride Safier $2.5 million and the Orin Safier v. Western Digital Corporation class action that was settled when the defendants agreed to pay Gutride Safier $500,000. The Western Digital case involved the same "binary vs decimal calculation" issue as the Vroegh v. Eastman Kodak case. In each of these cases, the named plaintiff was awarded $1000 to $2000 "for their time and effort".

Even though Netflix agreed to pay $2.5 million, the Judge in the case ultimately awarded Gutride Safier approximately $1.3 million.

On June 23, 2003, Gutride and Safier brought a Business Tort complaint against numerous defendants, including: Amazon.com, Target Corporation, Wal-Mart Corporation, Dell, Good-Guys, and many others for false and deceptive advertising of MP3 players on the same "binary vs decimal calculation" issue. Ultimately, all of the defendants settled.

== See also ==
- List of class action lawsuits
