= TNA Entertainment, LLC v. Wittenstein =

TNA Entertainment, LLC. v. Wittenstein and World Wrestling Entertainment, Inc. 12-0746-III was a lawsuit filed on May 23, 2012, in Nashville, Tennessee in the Chancery Court by TNA Entertainment, LLC., against former employee Brian Wittenstein and World Wrestling Entertainment, Inc. (doing business as WWE). WWE and TNA were the two largest national professional wrestling promotions in the United States. The suit alleged that Wittenstein violated a non-disclosure agreement and shared confidential information with WWE which represented a comparative advantage in negotiating with wrestling talent under contract with TNA.

The lawsuit was formally withdrawn without prejudice, by the plaintiff, TNA, on January 15, 2013, under a "Notice of Voluntary Nonsuit" which offers no ruling on the merits of the suit and allows TNA to potentially refile at a later date.

== Background ==
Brian Wittenstein signed a severance agreement with TNA, his former employer, on August 3, 2011, which included a non-disclosure agreement preventing him from disclosing certain confidential TNA information (including information regarding talent contracts). He was subsequently hired by WWE after which, TNA asserted that Wittenstein violated the agreement by downloading confidential TNA trade secrets and providing that information to WWE. WWE employees expressed concern about Wittenstein's tendency to state openly what he knew about TNA and Wittenstein was fired before completing his probationary period. Although WWE fired Wittenstein and alerted TNA officials as to the disclosure of the information, TNA claimed that WWE had access to the information for three weeks prior to disclosure and in this time, WWE used secret contract information and attempted to poach their talent in violation of Tennessee's Uniform Trade Secrets Act. The information was alleged to include data regarding wrestler compensation, which was used to recruit contracted TNA talent to work for WWE. One prominent wrestler named in the suit was Ric Flair, whom TNA claims asked for his release from the company in order to sign with WWE following Wittenstein's disclosure of information to WWE.

In TNA's suit, they stated:

In order to injure TNA and gain a competitive advantage, WWE intentionally interfered with TNA’s contractual relationship with Ric Flair and maliciously used the trade secrets and confidential information provided by Wittenstein to approach Ric Flair.

== Case ==
At the start of the case, the judge issued a temporary injunction against WWE requiring them to hand over any TNA classified documents they held, which WWE complied with and provided evidence of their servers that they had removed all confidential TNA information from their internal systems. The court also issued a permanent injunction against Wittenstein, requiring him to return all information he had on TNA and prohibited him from revealing the information to any third parties or from breaching any contracts he had with TNA.

During the case, WWE ordered its employees not to have any professional or social contact with anybody related to TNA. They also held off signing El Generico, later known as Sami Zayn, because he had wrestled for TNA. TNA requested an injunction to prohibit WWE from signing any former TNA wrestlers but the judge denied this on the grounds of WWE stated they had no intention to sign Ric Flair.

In January 2013, TNA announced they were dropping the lawsuit, with both sides covering their own legal fees and TNA covering the court costs.

== See also ==
- List of class-action lawsuits
