= Anderson v. Jackson =

Class action lawsuit over housing in New Orleans, Louisiana, United States

- Court: United States Court of Appeals for the Fifth Circuit
- Full case name: Anderson v. Jackson
- Decided: January 26, 2009
- Citation: 556 F.3d 351 (5th Cir. 2009)

Court membership
- Judges sitting: Jacques L. Wiener Jr., Emilio M. Garza, Harold R. DeMoss Jr.

Case opinions
- Majority: Garza, joined by Wiener, DeMoss

Laws applied
- Housing Act of 1937; Civil Rights Act of 1968

Anderson v. Jackson, 556 F.3d 351 (5th Cir. 2009) was a class action lawsuit seeking injunctive relief to prevent the demolition of four New Orleans public housing developments that were damaged by Hurricane Katrina. The suit alleged that the U.S. Department of Housing and Urban Development and state and city housing agencies were in violation of the U.S. Housing Act of 1937, the Civil Rights Act of 1968 (the Fair Housing Act), the Fifth Amendment to the U.S. Constitution and the Fourteenth Amendment to the U.S. Constitution.

Prior to Hurricane Katrina, the Housing Authority of New Orleans (HANO) planned to demolish and redevelop four deteriorated public housing developments: B.W. Cooper, C.J. Peete, St. Bernard, and Lafitte (collectively, "the Big Four"). After the Big Four suffered severe damage from Katrina, HANO proceeded with the plan for eventual demolition.

The lawsuit was dismissed by the district court and the dismissal was affirmed by the United States Court of Appeals for the Fifth Circuit.

== See also ==
- List of class-action lawsuits
