= Water contamination in Crestwood, Illinois =

Water contamination in Crestwood, Illinois, United States, a village in Cook County, was discovered in April 2009 by Tricia Krause, who reached out to local newspapers, which reported that the city had been using a well which was contaminated with toxic chemicals as the village's drinking water for 40 years.

== Timeline of events ==
=== April 2009 ===
==== Tricia Krause and Tim Janecyk reached out to the Tribune ====
In April 2009, Tim Janecyk and Tricia Krause reached out to the local newspapers. Tim initiated the tip to her and told her it was Crestwood officials who poisoned her family. She achieved all information regarding the contaminated water from her lengthy investigation. She had done research since 1999 seeking to find answers as to why her children were plagued with life-threatening health issues for now more than 30 years. She had given a journalist several large boxes of documentation of her detailed research about Crestwood.

Tricia Krause's records showed that in 1986, after the Illinois EPA had told them that Municipal Well #1 was contaminated, Crestwood officials had promised to start drawing all of their water from Lake Michigan, and to use the contaminated well only in emergencies. Instead, the well remained in use until December 2007. In 2007 the well was tested by the Illinois EPA for the first time in 20 years. The EPA also learned at that time that the well was still in regular use. Residents were not notified of the contamination by the Illinois EPA, the Illinois Department of Public Health or by the village.

Although the Illinois EPA claimed that they discovered the "illegal and secret" use of the well in late 2007, they never notified the residents of Crestwood that they had been drinking contaminated well water for more than twenty years.

==== Source of the contamination ====
"The most likely source of the contamination is a dry cleaners in a strip mall less than 300 feet from Crestwood's well, just across a narrow, tree-lined creek that drains into the nearby Cal-Sag Channel." The likely source of the contamination also emerged in 1986, when a company that owned the strip mall housing the dry cleaners tried to join an EPA cleanup program.

According to a story in the SouthTown Star newspaper, "Choong Suk Joo operated the dry cleaners for nearly 30 years out of what was then called Playfield Plaza."

The owner of the mall indicated that "from his knowledge the family had moved back to their native Korea." In addition, not one newspaper or news media channel ever reported that the engineering company that provided reports to the village of Crestwood indicated to hide the use of the well to the state.

==== The contaminants ====
Crestwood's public water supply was contaminated with perchloroethylene, or PCE, a dry-cleaning solvent linked to minor liver damage and neurological problems and vinyl chloride.

PCE is widely used as industrial solvents in particular for degreasing and cleaning metal parts and electronic components, and in dry cleaning.

PCE is known to break down in the environment into vinyl chloride.

Exposure to vinyl chloride, a known human carcinogen, can cause a number of health problems including blood tumors, liver tumors, liver cancer, permanent liver damage, immune system damage, nerve damage, reproductive effects.

The lowest levels (of vinyl chloride exposure) that produce liver changes, nerve damage, and immune reaction in people are not known. The US Environmental Protection Agency says that vinyl chloride is not safe to consume at any level. The most commonly recognized vinyl chloride related cancers include primary non-angiosarcoma liver cancer, primary brain cancer, lung cancer, lymphoma, and cancers of the blood and blood-forming organs. The non-malignant diseases caused by vinyl chloride exposure are systemic and serious, often resulting in a systemic sclerosis of the body as a whole, and are known outside the United States as "vinyl chloride disease."

===== Additional health concerns =====
Crestwood's municipal well is situated within 200 feet of Tinley Creek and approximately 800 feet from the Cal Sag Channel.

Both Tinley Creek and the Cal Sag Channel are located within the well's LAI or Lateral Area of Influence if the well is contributing more than approximately 13% of the village's drinking water supply.

Tinley Creek is consistently within the well's modeled zone of groundwater capture and lateral area of influence according to diagrams on the website of the Illinois EPA.

Although both bodies of water are in close proximity to Municipal Well #1, the impact of the contamination consequences and their dangers to the residents of Crestwood that received their drinking water from the public water supply has not been studied.

As of 2006 the Cal Sag Channel was used as a conduit for wastewater from southern Cook County, including the Chicago-area Deep Tunnel Project, into the Illinois Waterway. The Cal Sag Channel was originally engineered as "essentially an open sewage pipe to convey human and animal waste downstream." Due to concern over disposing of contaminated sediments, no dredging activities have occurred since 1972. Today, 90 percent of the Cal Sag Channel's flow originates as run off and municipal or industrial effluent, cooling and process water and storm water overflows.

The Cal Sag Channel is a part of the highly polluted Calumet River system.

== The "best-run town in America" ==
When Chester Stranczek started rebating property taxes to every homeowner during the mid-1990s, the action was so unusual the National Enquirer declared Crestwood the "best-run town in America."

"America's best small town mayor, Chester Stranczek, mayor of Crestwood, Illinois, is calling it quits after 50 years of public service." wrote Kristen Schorsch, a Daily Southtown staff writer, in an article published on August 1, 2007.

"If you want to define success, you can define in two words, Chester Stranczek." Schorsch elaborated in the 2007 story.

The June 2001 edition of the Crestwood Adviser, a village newsletter, is one of several that touts low water rates. Next to a portrait of Stranczek, it states: "… we can save you a lot of time by saying that Crestwood water has passed all the tests prescribed by the EPA during the past year. The results were very favorable, and we have safe drinking water."

In an interview with National Public Radio on October 17, 2007, producer Sam Hudzik said:

Stranczek's most proud of his more practical work as mayor. He runs the village just like the two businesses he founded. That mentality has led to a reputation as a stern administrator who leads Crestwood and the members of its elected board like a monarch. With few exceptions, projects he likes get approved. And nothing else stands a chance.

Hudzik interviewed Chester Stranczek in 2007 after he announced his retirement. Hudzik asked the people in the establishment what they thought of the soon to retire mayor. "What the hostess, a waitress and the breakfast crowd mention first about Stranczek is the one-of-a-kind property tax refund he arranges for homeowners." The NPR reporter summed up local sentiment concerning Chester Stranczek appointing his son Robert to be the next mayor of Crestwood, one replied "the folks at Country House Restaurant are fine with it - just so long as the tax rebates keep coming."

Chester Stranczek has not been challenged for office since 1973.

"I know every inch of Crestwood," Stranczek told the Chicago Sun-Times in 1997. "I know every curb, every sidewalk, every stormwater drain. I know all the dikes. I built most of them."

"As village officials were building a national reputation for pinching pennies, and sending out fliers proclaiming Crestwood water was 'Good to taste but not to waste!,' state and village records show they secretly were drawing water from a contaminated well, apparently to save money."

Mayor Chester Stranczek summed up his management style at a village meeting saying "I run this town with an iron fist."

Nick Valadez, a candidate for Cook County Commissioner in 2010 has a different take on Stranczek's rebates "While the village has played politics with the taxpayers—returning their taxes for votes—they turned their back on public safety. For the past quarter century or more, Crestwood residents have been drinking poisoned water" Valadez wrote on his campaign website. Valadez also said on the website "Chester Stranczek built his 50-year career on refunding village taxes to voters."

=== Whistleblowers ===
It was the work of two private citizens who became "whistleblowers" that brought the scandal to the attention of the public. Chicago WLS TV Channel 7's Paul Miencke reported on May 4, 2009 that "the story started with a man, Tim Janecyk, who was angry with police and politics in Crestwood after his wife was arrested for leaving their child in the car while she put money in a Salvation Army kettle in 2007." Meincke went on to say in that report "Janecyk joined forces with Tricia Krause, a woman who has spent more than ten years trying to convince others that something in Crestwood caused her children to develop cancer. She submitted dozens and dozens of FOIA requests to the IEPA demanding information about possible contributing factors. The IEPA response was "you'll never get anywhere; just drop it!". Her children have been plagued with various life-threatening health issues for more than twenty years. In 1999, Crestwood resident, Tricia Krause began trying to find answers as to why her three children were suffering almost constantly from a variety of illnesses ranging from viral meningitis, liver damage, acute pylonethritis, atypical bacteria infections, septic, staph infections, organ failure, whooping cough, neurological problems, compromised immune systems, a brain tumor to leukemia. In September 2015; she, in fact, was diagnosed with colon cancer. Her two babysitters were both diagnosed with brain tumors. She eventually found herself in Springfield, Illinois poring over documents at the state's EPA office. She discovered the well water which residents and the state were told was no longer in use was in fact being mixed with Lake Michigan water, sometimes by as much as almost 30 percent. This is the figure they provided to the USEPA federal investigators and IEPA officials. She later learned they used the well every day until the well went dry. It was never 20%, or 30%; it was all the time! The local baseball fields were saturated with contaminated toxic water. She researched for more than a decade, held numerous local town meetings, created her own epidemiological map and investigated every possible contributing factor. " Congressman Bobby Rush wrote about Tricia Krause in a press release "The government is supposed to protect its people but in this case it appears the Village of Crestwood did the complete opposite," Rush said. "Tricia Krause is an American hero for being brave enough, strong enough and persistent enough to expose this environmental travesty and get justice for the people of Crestwood."

Janecyk had been looking into rumors that the Village of Crestwood had been mixing contaminated water into the drinking water supply in early 2008. It was a somewhat cryptic posting on an internet website, Topix.com, on July 24, 2008, that affirmed the validity of his suspicions concerning the secret use of the contaminated well. The posting read "Is it just me or does the Crestwood tap water taste like its half city water and half Well water." The identity of this poster or their intentions has never been made public.

Janecyk learned about Tricia Krause's efforts to explain the illnesses of her children, who were all born in Crestwood, when he did a Google search using the words "Crestwood cancer", and he contacted her to begin many months-long collaboration to expose the use of the well. It was Krause's efforts that established proof of the subterfuge when she acquired numerous documents through many Freedom of Information Act requests that showed without a doubt that the village was using the contaminated well to provide drinking water for the residents.

Both Janecyk and Krause contacted the Illinois EPA a number of times to point out that the village was secretly using the contaminated well to obtain drinking water for the residents. Ultimately Janecyk became discouraged when the Illinois EPA staffer he had been talking to, Shabu Vazha, claimed that it was legal for Crestwood to use the well.

Tricia Krause had contacted the Illinois Attorney General's office numerous times and was unsuccessful for anyone in their office to reach out to her. She also wrote a letter to Governor Quinn demanding for an investigation to be initiated regarding the use of Crestwood's well. Krause had written a lengthy ten page letter to President Barack Obama informing him of the atrocious situation. For years I had written Senator Dick Durbin mentioning how sick my children had been. I also informed him about how many children were seeking treatment at our local pediatric oncology ward numerous times. We had more than 400 children seeking treatment. I implored him and all state officials to kindly look into what could be a factor.

The whistleblowers then turned to the media and tried unsuccessfully for several months to get a local newspaper to publish the story. After that setback Janecyk and Krause then provided environmental reporter Michael Hawthorne of the Chicago Tribune with Tricia's large boxes of documentation and evidence of the village officials' wrongdoing. Hawthorne investigated Crestwood's actions and then wrote the article "Poison in the Well" which was published on April 19, 2009.

=== Governor Quinn's response ===
The Chicago Tribune wrote on April 21, 2009:

Governor Pat Quinn is demanding answers from the Illinois Environmental Protection Agency about why residents of south suburban Crestwood weren't notified that the village had pumped drinking water contaminated with cancer-causing chemicals for more than two decades. Quinn directed his senior staff to conduct a thorough review of the EPA's actions in Crestwood. Among other things, the governor wants to know why the agency didn't invoke a 2005 law requiring the state to issue a notification when residents could be exposed to soil or groundwater pollution.

The Chicago Tribune made the point that "Quinn championed the right-to-know law while he was lieutenant governor." As of January 17, 2009, Illinois Governor Quinn has not made this report public.

Quinn said if village officials didn't comply with an order not to use the well "they're going to suffer serious consequences."

Dan Hynes, a Democrat running against Governor Quinn in the 2010 gubernatorial primary election, said in a statement referring to the Illinois EPA role in the Crestwood water situation, "I am calling on the governor immediately to dismiss Doug Scott (Director of the IL EPA)." Governor Quinn appeared with Illinois EPA Director Doug Scott at a bill-signing ceremony to enact legislation that would notify residents if their water is contaminated. At the event, Quinn defended the EPA chief. "Doug's been a good friend of mine, I worked with him as lieutenant governor and governor on this mission...to make sure that we have a healthful environment for every person in Illinois." Governor Quinn has retained Director Scott to run the Illinois EPA.

"The residents should be notified no matter what. I don't care what the law says, I think its important to go beyond the law so everybody in Crestwood gets a full report about what went on here," Governor Quinn said in an interview with WLS-TV. "Crestwood residents deserve an explanation."

Governor Quinn also wants to make it a felony to make false statements in the annual reports required by the federal Safe Drinking Water Act.

=== Illinois Department of Public Health ===
==== IDPH statement of August 13 2008 ====
Publicly, the Illinois EPA stated that they had discovered the use of the contaminated well at the end of 2007. The Illinois Department of Public Health issued a statement more than nine months later, only warning the public concerning the use of private wells in the area. The statement issued by the IDPH on August 13, 2008, said, "The Illinois Department of Public Health is advising residents who obtain their drinking water from private wells in the Crestwood area to test their water for possible groundwater contamination. Routine testing of the city's municipal water wells by the Illinois Environmental Protection Agency (IEPA) indicates contamination could be present in the area's private wells." Even though the Department of Public Health states that the Illinois EPA told them about the contaminants found, at this time, neither the Illinois EPA or the Department of Public Health notified the residents that they had been drinking water from the contaminated municipal well for more than 40 years.

Though the Illinois Department of Public Health warned the residents of Crestwood in their press release of August 13, 2008, that "The risk of adverse health effects depends on the level of contaminants in the water and the length of exposure" and that "Long-term exposure to this chemical may increase the risk of liver and kidney damage", they not only never suggested that the residents who drank from the contaminated municipal water supply for more than four decades should be concerned, they specifically told the residents of Crestwood that "[a]lthough the contaminants were found in Crestwood's ground water, Crestwood now receives all of its water from Lake Michigan, which meets U.S. Environmental Protection Agency standards, so those using the public water supply are not affected."

It is unknown whether or not the Illinois EPA actually told the Illinois Department of Public Health at this point that they had evidence that Crestwood had been using the contaminated well as a public water source for more than twenty years.

Based on information presented in their statement of August 13, 2008, it was clear that the Illinois Department of Public Health knew that long-term exposure to the contaminants found in Crestwood's well water presented a danger to the health of the residents of Crestwood.

==== IDPH will not release details of cancer study ====
A Chicago Tribune article from December 29, 2009, accused the Illinois Department of Public Health of withholding information on the carcinogenic effects of the village's water "Six months after state health officials declared their investigation of cancer rates in south suburban Crestwood was almost complete, they have yet to release the results. The Illinois Department of Public Health, which earlier had failed to notify Crestwood residents that their municipal water supply was contaminated with toxic chemicals, declined to answer questions about the cancer study. The agency also has rejected the Tribune's requests for cancer data filed under the Illinois Freedom of Information Act." The reporter explained, "In a letter rejecting one of those requests, Damon Arnold, the state health director, had said the study would be released to the public in July (2009). Now agency officials say it won't be officially available until sometime next year (2010), leaving residents guessing if their decades-long exposure to carcinogen-laced tap water contributed to health problems." "When the Tribune requested the same data, state health officials said granting the information would violate patient privacy rights. That ruling came despite a 2006 decision by the Illinois Supreme Court that ordered the department to release similar information to another newspaper, the Southern Illinoisan."

The Tribune article further elaborated on the Illinois Department of Public Health, "This isn't the first time the state Public Health Department has withheld information related to Crestwood. The agency previously failed to tell residents they had been drinking contaminated water for years, despite a 2005 right-to-know law requiring the department or the state EPA to notify citizens who could be exposed to groundwater pollution."

==== Reaction ====
===== The Illinois EPA and director Doug Scott =====
Douglas P. Scott, the director of the Illinois Environmental Protection Agency, the bureaucracy that had regulatory oversight of Crestwoods water system published a statement concerning Crestwoods water supply on April 20, 2009. The statement is on Crestwood's village website In that statement, Scott said that even though the well water that Crestwood used was contaminated that "the health of the public was never at risk" and he went on to say that their use of the well was illegal.

"For Crestwood residents, it's important for them to understand that, while we believe what the village did was incredibly wrong, that the water during that time period was safe to drink," said Illinois EPA Director Doug Scott.

Scott's comment that the "health of the public was never at risk" was premature as the scope of the contamination and the contamination itself were at that point unknown to the officials and his comment contradicted the opinion of the Illinois Department of Health in their press release from August 13, 2008 (as of January 4, 2010, the Illinois Department of Health refused to release a study of cancer cases in Crestwood that their director claimed was "almost complete" in July 2009). This caused public outrage and resulted in accusations of a "cover-up" by the Illinois EPA.

In an interview on April 28, 2009 with Mike Flannery, Scott was asked about health effects of drinking the contaminated water. When asked if someone could have gotten sick from the water, Scott said, "It's possible."

At the town hall meeting held on May 9, 2009, at the Oak Forest Hospital by Congressman Bobby Rush, Illinois EPA Director Doug Scott admitted that he could not say with any certainty that there would be no negative health effects on the residents who drank the contaminated water and when pressed to answer the question "would you let your children drink this water" Scott remained silent and refused to answer the question.

Even after discovering the use of the polluted well the Illinois EPA had failed to notify the public that they had been consuming water from it for more than two decades. Illinois EPA Director Doug Scott said, "The Illinois EPA strongly believes in the public's right to know about any environmental situation that could potentially be harmful to them" after stronger legislation was passed in part to address his organizations failings in this case.

"The Illinois EPA has cited Crestwood twice for violating environmental laws, once for using the contaminated well and again for repeatedly telling residents that all of their tap water was treated lake water." Both of these actions were taken only after the secret use of the contaminated well became public knowledge. Prior to this thru a FOIA; the EPA knew Crestwood was using a well they reprimanded them.

===== Congressman Bobby Rush =====
U.S. Representative Bobby Rush (D-Ill.), who represents Crestwood, sent a letter to the U.S. EPA Administrator Lisa Jackson demanding a federal investigation. "This was a deceitful act and someone must be held accountable," Rush said in a statement.

===== Illinois Representative Robert Rita =====
State Representative Robert Rita said, "Crestwood residents deserve to know the full story about the safety of their drinking water, while we work to find out exactly what has been going on in Crestwood, we are taking this important step to ensure that no other community is denied the right to know about threats to their drinking water" referring to legislation that he co-sponsored in the Illinois House of Representatives as a result of the water scandal in Crestwood.

===== Cook County Commissioner Joan Murphy =====
Cook County Commissioner Joan Murphy, who lives in Crestwood, planned to meet with Crestwood officials. She said the mayor told her monthly and quarterly checks of drinking water came out clean. "I've been horrifically upset all weekend," she said. "I'm going to have my children go into the doctor and be tested as well as myself."

===== Illinois EPA spokesman =====
A spokesman for the Illinois EPA had this to say to Phil Kadner of the Southtown Star newspaper:

"Crestwood officials told us the well had been shut down and that only Lake Michigan drinking water was being used," the IEPA spokeswoman said. "We trusted them. They lied to us. We trust public officials to tell us the truth, and 99 percent of the time they do. What are we supposed to do? Assume they are lying?"

===== Others =====
Shawn Collins, an environmental attorney said, "Someone (in Crestwood) made the decision that water, other than lake water, could be mixed in and that was an unlawful decision, in my opinion, and I would hope someone will look into who put these families in harm's way. Whether any civil lawsuits result, there should be a criminal investigation into whether laws were broken."

=== Mayor Robert Stranczek's April 2009 meeting ===
==== Response of residents ====
In a contentious meeting in April 2009, according to an article on Chicago Breaking News "an outraged and skeptical standing-room-only crowd shouted him (Crestwoods Mayor Stranczek) down and demanded to know why local officials secretly used a polluted well for more than two decades."

"The mayor of Crestwood says the 11,000 residents of his town have nothing to worry about but that's not deflating their fears."

"Flanked by a pitcher of water sweating as much as he was, Crestwood Mayor Robert Stranczek this morning defended the village's role in allowing chemically contaminated well water to be mixed with Lake Michigan water and fed into residents' homes," wrote Carole Sharwarko in the Southtown Star newspaper.

Mayor Stranczek said the well was used only for "emergency backup purposes."

"There is no evidence that the drinking water that flowed from our kitchen taps contained any substances inconsistent with what the law allows" said Crestwood's mayor.

"At least 200 people attended the meeting. Some defended village leaders, while others demanded to know why officials didn't tell residents about the contamination. Many later said they didn't get a satisfactory answer" according to a Fox News report.

"Residents screamed at the mayor, calling him a liar and demanding answers... many residents called the meeting a waste of time" according to a report on CLTV's website.

"The morning meeting was meant to calm concerns" said Channel 7's Ben Bradley "Instead it brought a flood of complaints, not to mention anger directed at Crestwood's mayor."

"Longtime residents are wondering whether illnesses were caused by contaminated water. And town leaders are facing a credibility crisis" reported WLS TV.

"The bottomline is they don't know so I'm upset because we're going to be lab rats for the next 20, 30, 40, 50 years," said Crestwood resident Wendy Brunette at the meeting the Mayor hosted.

==== Potential motive ====
At the meeting the village's mayor Robert Stranczek was pressed on his motive for using the water from the contaminated well. "Sitting next to an attorney, Stranczek denied that the well was used to save money. "If it was a money issue, we would have been running 20, 25, 30 percent well water," the mayor said.

Later statements by the Illinois EPA would show that the village actually did get more than twenty percent of its drinking water from the well.

Phil Kadner, a reporter for the SouthTown Star newspaper, said of former Mayor Chester Stranczek, "I think, like many conservative businessmen, Stranczek always believed that environmentalists were full of hooey. It's likely he viewed environmental regulations as a costly waste of time and money."

Chester Stranczek was noted to have run the village like a business. "Businesses don't become successful by running at a loss," said Stranczek.

==== A political power source ====
Crestwood buys Lake Michigan water from Alsip and its leaders have always boasted of its low water rates. A Daily Southtown story in 2005 about water rates found Crestwood's were the lowest in the Southland at $2 per 1,000 gallons. The average Southland water rate was $3.43 per 1,000 gallons.

Low water rates were a source of political power for the Stranczek administrations. Officials touted the village's cheap water rates during the four decades they secretly used the contaminated well.

Asked why the village did not inform residents of the tainted well four decades ago, the mayor (Robert Stranczek) said, "there were no violations" at that time." There would not have been any testing for groundwater contaminants over those two decades because the village, when ordered to test Municipal Well #1, in a letter to the IL EPA said, "This sampling would not apply to our facility,' because the town's water came from Lake Michigan and not the well."

After the meeting, the mayor shook hands with a few residents, exited quickly out a back door and was whisked away in a blue SUV.

==== Tricia Krause's meeting ====
The Chicago Breaking News article also reported on a meeting held later that day by Tricia Krause, an environmental activist and the contaminated water whistleblower at a church in the neighboring village of Palos Heights. More than 600 residents attended the meeting. During that meeting hundreds of people vocalized their anger and sadness about the shocking truth of the water. Many citizens stood up and discussed openly their cancer stories. They also told their story of the death of a loved one who had cancer. Tricia Krause had informed them that she requested the Attorney General's office to concrete the well shut. She had confirmed and showed pictures that in fact; it was accomplished. They were told that now they were receiving Lake Michigan water to their homes. It wasn't until finally 2015; Crestwood began to make a serious commitment to rebuild the infrastructure.

During the federal trial; Tricia Krause was hired by her attorney to gather information regarding the case. She also worked on the motion summary judgment for several months. This information she acquired was sufficient to win the first case. The town of Crestwood was using the well 100% until it went dry. She proved they were not using 10% as the village stated.

=== Congressman Rush's speech ===
Congressman Bobby Rush, himself a cancer survivor, spoke at the meeting organized by Tricia Krause.

"U.S. Rep. Bobby Rush (D-Ill.), whose district includes Crestwood, spoke to about 600 people at a church in neighboring Palos Heights. Rush said he sent a letter to United States Environmental Protection Agency administrator Lisa P. Jackson demanding the federal agency come to Crestwood to hold public meetings, investigate the village and test to ensure the drinking water is safe.

At the meeting Congressman Rush said, "Government is supposed to protect its people, It is almost unheard of. It is atrocious. It is shameful. It is criminal for government to knowingly and willfully feed its people contaminated water and year after year lie about it. We are going to get to the truth."

Tricia Krause had invited Shawn Collins, an environmental attorney from Naperville to speak at the meeting. He stated, "These chemicals did not cause every cancer in Crestwood, but if what happened here - this deliberate infiltration of the water system - caused one, it is wrong." Collins went on to describe the chemicals found in Crestwoods well "They are industrial solvents used to do the most heavy duty kinds of industrial cleaning. They do not belong in the human body."

Congressman Rush also said, "You are not fighting for Crestwood. You are fighting for America," The Congressman called US Attorney General Eric Holder from his seat at the meeting and pressed him to open a United States Department of Justice investigation into the actions of the Crestwood officials.

==== Calls for federal investigation ====
On April 20, 2009, Congressman Rush called for a federal investigation on the Village of Crestwood to determine if civil or criminal charges are warranted against the municipality after learning more than 51 million gallons of toxic water annually was knowingly pumped into citizen's homes for more than 40 years. The action resulted in a raid nine days later in which more than a dozen federal agents raided city facilities and seized documents.

=== Cover-up ===
Journalist Gregory Tajeda of the Chicago Argus said in an article on April 21, 2009, that "Crestwood's tainted water "cover-up" is not a surprise to political observers." Michael Hawthorne of the Chicago Tribune in an article he wrote on June 10th 2009 alleges that there was "a systematic coverup of Crestwood's routine use of its tainted well." What no one knew was this was not an isolated incident.

A resident at the Mayors meeting in Crestwood yelled to Mayor Stranczek "You covered up the evidence." referring to the secret use of the contaminated well

"This is an intentional poisoning of more than 11,000 people. And they wanted it to die, wanted the story to go bye-bye," said Tim Janecyk, Crestwood whistleblower.

Chester Stranczek, Crestwoods former mayor has dealt with environmentalists before. He called incinerator opponents "cockroaches" and "junkies" at public meetings, refused to let them speak, had them arrested when they did and used his police department to harass their families, according to Phil Kadner of the Southtown Star newspaper.

Those who disagreed with Chester Stranczek on environmental matters previously commented on the former mayors tactics "Police parked at the end of our block and watched my children leave the house and followed them outside. It was an atmosphere of intimidation that you would expect to see in Nazi Germany" one resident told the SouthTown Star.

"Mary Schultz was arrested with three others for disorderly conduct by Crestwood police for attempting to speak at a public meeting" Kadner reported. Schultz added "And I see a lot of similarities between that incinerator project and the water contamination. It's exactly the same mentality as far as I'm concerned."

Reporters were also kept away from village meetings in Crestwood "I witnessed some of that myself at the time when our reporters tried to attend a town meeting that Stranczek organized to rally support for the incinerator" Phil Kadner said, "The mayor refused to let us inside." Kadner, a reporter for the SouthTown Star commented, "as we waited in the parking lot, the police chief, with his hand on his holster, said we would have to leave or he would arrest us."

==== Mayor's letter ====
In a letter that he sent to all of the residents and business owners in Crestwood, dated April 22, 2009, and posted on the village's website the current Mayor Robert Stranczek admitted, "For years until 2007, well water, treated by chlorine, was periodically incorporated into the village water supply during times of high demand." This statement was contrary to the statements the village had made in its annual Consumer Confidence Reports concerning its water quality where each year since 1987 the source of its water was given as "Lake Michigan."

In this letter Stranczek writes "the public's health was never at risk." Congressman Bobby Rush is asking federal EPA inspectors to confirm that claim.

When asked about the Mayor's letter to the residents, Congressman Rush said about the Mayor "He's lied about so much right now I think the mayor has very little to no credibility."

The classification of Crestwoods water system is listed as "SWP" (Surface Water Purchased) in the state records. Any water system classified as "SWP" would not be tested by the Illinois EPA for volatile organic compounds or any other of the dangerous chemicals that might be found in well water. Intentionally misleading the state regarding the source of its water would allow the village of Crestwood to avoid testing for common groundwater contaminants.

==== Former mayor comments ====
In an interview with the Southtown Star on April 19, 2009, when pressed to make a statement on the use of Municipal Well #1, former Crestwood Mayor Chester Stranczek said he "didn't know the story" and couldn't talk publicly about allegations the village knowingly drew drinking water from a contaminated well." Stranczek's wife, Diane, said the well supply in question "hasn't been used in ages."

Chester Stranczek also said, "I can tell you that it was and is being tested," referring to the contaminated well "I can guarantee you the well was being tested regarding IEPA rules and time lines. Even more." He went on to say in an interview with the Southtown Star, "As far as the water being contaminated I don't believe that... Reports showed it was drinkable. Tests that were taken never showed that we had bad water."

==== Nick Valadez comments on Joan Murphy ====
Nick Valadez, a candidate for the Cook County Board, noted that incumbent Cook County Commissioner Joan Murphy tried to deflect criticism of Crestwood mayors Chester and Robert Stranczek for their role in denying and covering up the village conduct in the matter. Valadez said in an interview with Ray Hanania that "Murphy has defended Stranczek and called those who complained about the hazardous water in Crestwood whiners."

===== Prior knowledge of EPA officials =====
"Village officials, as well as the state EPA, knew the well was contaminated at least as early as 1986, records show.

Twelve years after they were first told that the water coming from Municipal Well #1 was contaminated, the village officials were informed again. According to the Chicago Tribune:

State records obtained by the Tribune show the village was aware of the contamination on at least one other occasion. In 1998, village officials were present when contractors tested the well while investigating a plume of perchloroethylene, or PCE, that had leached into the ground nearby. The PCE most likely came from a dry cleaner less than 300 feet from the well. In a letter found in EPA files, the contractors wrote that village officials told them they still were drawing from the well for a portion of the village's water supply.

Tricia Krause had travelled to the Illinois Environmental Protection Agency and while reviewing records, she discovered the well water which residents and the state were told was no longer in use was, in fact, being mixed with Lake Michigan water.

==== Evidence on EPA's files ====
Tricia Krause had given the letter that the Chicago Tribune refers to was "found in EPA files." The Illinois EPA was in possession of proof that the Village of Crestwood was not only lying about the source of their water, the Illinois EPA had evidence in a file since 1998 and they allowed the residents of Crestwood to drink contaminated water for almost another ten years.

==== 1993 "sole source" document ====
Another document found in the files of the Illinois EPA was pointed to as proof of a cover-up by the agency. "The 1993 IEPA document that details a survey of the now-infamous well No. 1, which is near the intersection of Illinois 83 and 127th Street. The report says the well was the sole source of Crestwood water, pumping close to 1.3 million gallons a day." Maura Possley of the Southtown Star pressed the IL EPA on the meaning of the document "the agency quickly brushed aside the report, saying the sole-source claim was an error, a mistake made by a rookie" she wrote in an article on July 17, 2009.

"The person that did the field work left and someone else picked that thing up and finished kind of the writing," said IEPA's Rick Cobb, the deputy manager of the Division of Public Water Supplies. "Anytime you do that, you're bound to make mistakes."

=== The US EPA raids Crestwood ===
==== Agents storm Crestwood's village offices ====
On April 29, 2009, led by Special Agent Randall K. Ashe and armed with a search warrant obtained by US Attorney Patrick Fitzgerald, federal agents raided Crestwood's village hall and their Department of Public Works building as well as the police department.

The Southtown Star newspaper reported, "A total of 15 EPA agents, state police investigators and members of the U.S. Coast Guard's investigative service unit arrived at 9 a.m. and combed village offices for records until sometime around 5 p.m." Reporter Nathaniel Zimmer said, "Speaking in the vestibule of village hall, EPA Special Agent in Charge Randall Ashe said the agents were searching for "any evidence of crimes that may have occurred."

A US Government UH-60 Black Hawk helicopter provided "air support" during the raid.

The authorities spent the entire day removing boxes of paperwork and computer equipment and taking statements from employees of the village.

The Chicago Tribune reported that "The involvement of federal prosecutors signals a significant turn in the case. Most violations of environmental laws are handled in civil court, and criminal pollution investigations typically are directed at corporations and individuals, not municipalities."

Fred L. Burnside, a former EPA agent, said, "EPA special agents are the national experts on environmental crimes investigations, and their efforts have resulted in impressive indictment and conviction rates." Burniside pointed out that "In a review of all "closed" environmental crimes investigations where the Office of Criminal Enforcement, Forensics and Training served a search warrant, it was determined that criminal charges were filed against violators 67 percent of the time. Of those charged, convictions were obtained in 94 percent of the cases."

==== Mayor Stranczek's statement after the raid ====
Mayor Robert Stranczek made a one-line statement at about 12:35 p.m. Standing on the front steps of village hall, he said: "Right now our drinking water is 100 percent safe and the village doesn't believe there was anything wrong with it prior to this."

As a horde of media shouted questions, the mayor returned to his offices. Stranczek would not answer any questions about the village's use of the contaminated well. It is known that the village paid a firm to continue to inform the citizens of Crestwood that there was nothing wrong with their water.

==== Congressman Rush comments on raid ====
Commenting on the raid, Congressman Bobby Rush said:

"I commend the USEPA for its swift action today. At the request of the USEPA the U.S. Attorney's Office obtained search warrants for the village. I was briefed on the raid this morning by USPEA officials after I communicated to USEAP Administrator Lisa Jackson last week that the agency needed to launch a thorough investigation," Rep. Rush said. "I also requested on Monday that Atty. General Eric Holder engage the U.S. Department of Justice in this matter-- and I am pleased to see that they are involved. We want the truth to come out on this matter and we want the Crestwood residents to be made whole."

The raid on Crestwood was led by the Chicago office of the EPA's criminal division, a little-known group that agency officials in Washington have recently promoted more aggressively.

=== May 2009 ===
==== IEPA statement ====
The Illinois Environmental Protection Agency wrote on its website in May 2009 that "When the 2007 illegal use of the well was determined in December of 2007, the Illinois EPA began enforcement action by sending a Non-Compliance Advisory letter to Crestwood advising against future use of the emergency back-up well found to be contaminated stating, "the use of Well #1…is a clear violation of the Illinois Environmental Protection Act[.]"

==== Second class action lawsuit ====
On May 1 the Southtown Star newspaper reported that a second class action lawsuit was filed against Crestwood.

A second class-action lawsuit has been filed against Crestwood and its past two mayors for allegedly endangering the public health by allowing residents to drink water from a contaminated well for more than 20 years. The lawsuit, filed by Crestwood resident Kathryn Torrisi, accuses the village, Mayor Robert Stranczek, former Mayor Chester Stranczek and unnamed co-conspirators of concealing the presence of chemicals in the village's tap water and "unscrupulously" causing the tainted water to be pumped into homes and businesses.

==== Third class-action lawsuit ====
On May 2, 2009, a third class-action lawsuit has been filed over tainted drinking water. The lawsuit was filed by former Crestwood resident Diana Delarosa. She lost four family members to diseases possibly linked to contaminated water.

==== First wrongful death lawsuit ====
The Chicago Tribune reported on May 15, 2009:

The widow of a man who died of lymphoma in 2003 is suing the Illinois village of Crestwood for his wrongful death. Michele Maan De Kok's Cook County, Illinois wrongful death lawsuit contends that he became ill after drinking contaminated water while living there from 1969 to 1990.

John Maan De Kok was diagnosed with stage IV non-Hodgkin's lymphoma in 2000. When he died, he left behind his wife Michele and their two young children. Maan De Kok's family members had no idea why he had this particular kind of cancer, which is normally found in industrial workers that have been around hazardous chemicals. It wasn't until Michelle read last month's Chicago Tribune report that she linked the contaminated water to her husband's death.

==== Congressman Rush's town meeting ====
Congressman Rush hosted a town hall meeting at the Oak Forest Hospital on Saturday, May 9, 2009, where he questioned the USEPA, IEPA & CDC on the Crestwood Water contamination situation. About 400 people turned out for a public forum where federal officials continued to answer the public's questions about the village of Crestwood's secret use of a polluted well. "Crestwood residents rally for justice, determine next steps" was the title on Congressman Rush's press release promoting the meeting. The official press release stated "On Saturday, May 9, U.S. Rep. Bobby L. Rush (IL-01) will host an urgent town hall meeting from 12 noon. to 2 p.m. where he will question the U.S. Environmental Protection Agency (U.S. EPA), Illinois Environmental Protection Agency (IEPA) and the U.S. Centers for Disease Control and Prevention (CDC) on why the Village of Crestwood continued to give its residents contaminated tap water despite being warned the source of the water was polluted with a cancer-causing toxin." The press release continued to detail Congressman Rush's concerns "participants include USPEA representatives Tinka Hyde, director of the water division in Region 5, and Thomas Poy, chief groundwater and drinking water branch of the agency: IEPA Director Douglas P. Scott, Chief Toxicologist Dr. Tom Hornshaw and Deputy Manager, Division of Public Water Rick Cobb; CDC Senior Environmental health Scientist Mark Johnson of the Agency for Toxic Substances and Disease Registry. Citizens will also have the opportunity to question government officials."

==== Senator Durbin urges study ====
A May 5, 2009 article in the Chicago Tribune posted on Senator Durbin's website reported "As federal authorities conduct a criminal investigation of Crestwood's secret use of a polluted well, U.S. Sen. Dick Durbin is urging government health experts to study whether anyone got sick from drinking the water. Durbin, the Senate's assistant majority leader, sent a letter this week to the Agency for Toxic Substances and Disease Registry that nudges federal and state health officials to at least attempt to answer those difficult questions." The Tribune article said that "The Illinois Democrat cited "the uncertainty surrounding the level and duration of exposure" to Crestwood's contaminated water and noted the U.S. Environmental Protection Agency "cannot say with certainty that these levels would not cause adverse health effects." The article went on to point out that "Durbin's call for a federal health investigation comes as other members of Congress are accusing the disease registry of consistently underestimating health risks at other polluted sites." He did just enough to appease the citizens.

==== Water Commissioner Frank Avila ====
Commissioner Frank Avila of the Metropolitan Water Reclamation District of Greater Chicago (MWRDGC) a long time clean water advocate wrote on his blog on May 7, 2009:

"Though the case in Crestwood is more dramatic and immediately dangerous than most environmental issues, the lack of accurate and clear public information is an unsettling trend. I believe that government officials who hold information regarding environmental hazards from the public should have to answer for their dereliction of duty." Avila goes on to write "Until we begin assigning true accountability to the people who hold this vital public information, until we begin making clear statements that environmental dangers should always be public knowledge, nothing will be done and we will be left with no recourse, just a blind hope for honesty."

=== June 2009 ===
On June 1, 2009, the Chicago Tribune reported "Legislation inspired by a controversy over tainted water in Crestwood went to the desk of Gov. Pat Quinn today as House lawmakers overwhelmingly voted to ensure citizens are notified when their drinking water is contaminated. The state legislation also would make it a felony to provide false information to environmental enforcement officials."

On June 9, 2009, House Bill 4021 passed in the Illinois General Assembly. "Attorney General Lisa Madigan today applauded the General Assembly's passage of legislation that requires prompt notification to all users when drinking water is contaminated. Madigan worked with Governor Quinn and the Illinois Environmental Protection Agency (IEPA) to draft House Bill 4021, which amends the Illinois Right to Know law. State Rep. Frank Mautino (D-Spring Valley) and State Sens. Susan Garrett (D-Lake Forest) and Emil Jones, III (D-Chicago) sponsored House Bill 4021." Attorney General Madigan said, "We need to make sure that what happened to Crestwood residents never happens again in Illinois, The law needed to be strengthened to protect public safety and to restore public trust."

==== Mayor Chester Stranczek's management ====
The Chicago Tribune reported on June 10, 2009 that:

Chester Stranczek (former mayor of Crestwood) in particular boasted that he ran Crestwood like a business. He attracted national recognition for pinching pennies, rebating property taxes and maintaining the lowest water rates in Cook County. Using the well, located under the village water tower off 127th Street, enabled officials to cut back on their purchases of lake water and freed them from expensive testing of the well.

...

Chester and Robert Stranczek also signed annual "consumer confidence reports" required under the federal Safe Drinking Water Act. Each report, as well as notices they published in a local newsletter, claimed that all of the village's drinking water came from Lake Michigan.

...

[Michael Hawthorne, who authored the article wrote] In an April 24 interview with the Tribune, (Robert) Stranczek acknowledged he has known about the use of the well since at least 1997, when he became a village trustee. He was appointed mayor in 2007 when his father (Chester Stranczek) retired.

==== Second wrongful death lawsuit ====
On June 17, 2009, the second wrongful death lawsuit was filed against the Village of Crestwood and former mayor Chester Stranczek:

Walsh, Knippen, Knight & Pollock, Chartered was recently retained by the surviving children whose parents, two residents of the Village of Crestwood, IL, both recently died from cancer as a result of drinking and using toxic, carcinogenic Village well water over a time period of 13 years. Investigation by the Illinois Environmental Protection Agency has determined that for more than 20 years Village of Crestwood officials were intentionally mixing well water toxically contaminated with vinyl chloride, together with clean and safe Lake Michigan water, for consumption and use by Village residents. Vinyl chloride is a known carcinogenic. The IEPA has recently determined and concluded that this action and conduct by the Village of Crestwood was illegal. In 1986 the IEPA ordered the Village not to pump and distribute the contaminated water for drinking and use by Village residents. Amazingly, however, for 40 years, the Village violated the IEPA order and its agreement with the IEPA by intentionally pumping and distributing the vinyl chloride contaminated water to its residents.

==== Illinois Attorney General actions ====
===== IAG files suit =====
Illinois Attorney General Lisa Madigan, Mike Madigan's daughter filed a 58-page lawsuit against the Village of Crestwood, Robert Stranczek the current mayor, Chester Stranczek, Crestwood's former mayor and Frank Scaccia, the former director of the water department on June 9, 2009. The suit alleges that the officials not only knew that the water was contaminated and still gave it to the people of Crestwood, but also that the officials named lied to the state, the federal government and the people of Crestwood as many as 122 times. Madigan seeks a fifty thousand dollar fine against each party and an additional ten thousand dollars per occasion of dishonesty. All of the named parties have already admitted to the fact that they used the water from well number one. Madigan insists this is the first step in a long process and does not rule out criminal charges.

"Crestwood officials violated the public's trust and the laws designed to protect public health. Through this lawsuit, we are seeking to hold these officials accountable for their conduct and to make sure that this does not happen again in Illinois," Madigan is quoted as saying in a statement.

Crestwood Mayor Robert Stranczek's office issued a statement saying officials were "extremely disappointed" by Madigan's lawsuit.

On March 13, 2010, Maura Possley of the SouthTown Star reported that "an attorney for Robert Stranczek has moved to have him dismissed from Madigan's lawsuit, citing his November 2007 ascension to the post - two months after the well's use was halted." Possley went on to write that "before taking the place of his father, who was mayor for 38 years, Robert Stranczek served as a village trustee."

In responding to the Attorney General's lawsuit, Possley reported that "Scaccia (the village's water director)invoked his Fifth Amendment right against self-incrimination numerous times in his response to Madigan's lawsuit."

===== Attorney General investigation =====
"The first that we heard about this was Tricia Krause," said Attorney General Lisa Madigan." Madigan was referring to Crestwoods secret use of the contaminated well.

Madigan's office is currently investigating the actions of the Village of Crestwood regarding the use of a contaminated well as a source of drinking water. The office is working to determine what the village did, what the village knew, and when the village knew it, as well as which environmental laws were violated. The office is also working to identify the source of the contamination.

When she was asked if there would be criminal charges in the Crestwood case the Attorney General replied "Somebody has to be held responsible."

"A safe water supply is absolutely critical to the health and safety of the people of Illinois," added Madigan. "The bill passed by the General Assembly strengthens the law and will help to keep our drinking water safe."

The Illinois Attorney General's website says:

One of the primary responsibilities of the Attorney General's office is safeguarding the public by protecting the environment. Attorney General Madigan plays a significant role in protecting the health and welfare of all Illinois residents and strives to provide a future that will include a safe environment. The Office of the Attorney General handles both civil and criminal litigation of environmental crimes."

US Attorney Patrick Fitzgerald, who obtained the federal criminal search warrant to raid the village's offices has still not made public any federal criminal charges as of June 12, 2009.

==== US EPA actions ====
Special Agent in charge of criminal investigations, Randall Ashe of the United States Environmental Protection Agency stated in front of television news cameras and reporters on the day that the offices of Crestwoods public works were raided that "this is the first time in history that the United States EPA has obtained a criminal search warrant on another government agency."

===== Special Agent Randall Ashe =====
An article reposted on a website called "SierraActivist" (originally written on 2.14.2003 by Richard Boyd of The Times-Picayune newspaper) commented on the EPA Special Agent: "When Randall Ashe or any of his six agents show up, it is too late for one more chance; it's time to pay the piper for committing serious environmental crimes. Ashe and his agents carry weapons, have arrest power, can obtain search warrants and conduct secret surveillance, and work with federal or state authorities in prosecuting individuals and companies that commit environmental crimes. "When we show up, it is too late for more compromise, more negotiating, more one-more-chance to do right," Ashe said. "We show up when it is time to make the case, collect the evidence, get the search and arrest warrants, and proceed with criminal prosecutions." Ashe's attitude towards environmental offenders is summed up in a quote from a USEPA news release from February 5, 2009: "People who cheat on environmental laws to save money need to know that we will investigate them and prosecute them to the full extent of the law."

===== Feds Raid Crestwood's engineering firm =====
According to a June 25, 2009, report by Chicago's WGN radio:

Federal agents raided the offices of Crestwood's engineering firm, the latest step in a criminal investigation into the Cook County suburb's secret use of a community well contaminated with cancer-causing chemicals. Randy Chastain, president of Burke Engineering, 18330 Distinctive Dr., Orland Park, confirmed that investigators from the U.S. Environmental Protection Agency served a search warrant obtained by U.S. Atty. Patrick Fitzgerald's office. The agents left with boxes of engineering diagrams and other records related to the firm's work for Crestwood. "We're cooperating," Chastain said. "We offered them everything we have on record."

The IEPA's recently released report on Crestwood's drinking water did say that harmful chemicals were detected near the suspected source of the well's contamination, a dry-cleaning business located about 300 feet from the well. Not one newspaper or news channel reported information that the engineering company for the village of Crestwood was also involved in the debacle.

=== August 2009 ===
==== Legislation ====
Illinois' Governor Pat Quinn, reacting to public outrage, signed House Bill 4021 into law in August 2009 addressing many of the legal issues that grew out of the contaminated water scandal in Crestwood. WLS TV's Paul Miencke reported on August 23, 2009 Tricia Krause proposed the bill to incur a 50 year sentence of jail time so that there would never be another Crestwood incident. No one heard her voice. Bill 4021 was made to break again. It was now only a felony if someone tampered with the water supply. Madigan stated: "We need to make sure that what happened to Crestwood residents never happens again in Illinois... The law needed to be strengthened to protect public safety and to restore public trust."

Gov. Pat Quinn signed a bill Sunday that he says will help ensure Illinois citizens have safe, clean drinking water. The bill is designed to prevent future incidents like the water contamination discovered earlier this year in south suburban Crestwood, Ill. For years, Crestwood village officials told townspeople that all their water came from Lake Michigan exclusively, when records showed that Crestwood was co-mingling its lake water with water from a village well that had shown levels of a known carcinogen. The governor has signed a law that will require water suppliers to notify all their customers if tests reveal any contamination with their water supply. In Crestwood's case, the EPA had long ago told the village that the well in question had problems, but Crestwood didn't tell residents. Under the new law, water suppliers have five days to notify all of their customers of any problems.

Commenting on the law just signed by Governor Quinn, Attorney General Lisa Madigan said:

They certainly weren't telling people who were drinking that water, brushing their teeth with that water, cooking with that water, showering with that water, that the water had contaminants in it. That is simply wrong, and it needs to end.

==== Changes to ILEPA ====
According to Miencke, "The state EPA, because of the Crestwood issue, is changing one aspect of its water testing. There are more than 1,000 communities in Illinois that deliver water that they first purchase from someone else, another community or supplier. The EPA has always done its water quality testing at the supplier. Now, it will test at the distribution point."

In the July/August 2009 issue of Illinois Issues, author Bethany Jaeger reports that "because village officials reported that the well served only as an emergency backup, it wasn't required to be tested. And the state relies on an honor system for such reporting."There was no federal requirement. They (village officials)knew what they were doing," says Rick Cobb, deputy manager of the state EPA's Division of Public Water Supply. The department (IL EPA)detected vinyl chloride in Crestwood's well in September 2007. Less than two months later, Crestwood maintained that it still did not draw water from the well. The story changed on August 21, 2008, when Frank Scaccia, the former water supply operator, told officials that the village did, indeed, supplement Lake Michigan water with well water.

==== Water director retains an attorney ====
Frank Scaccia's attorney, Bill Seith of Total Environmental Solutions in Oakbrook Terrace, said his client "is certainly very interested in making sure that everybody is properly informed." According to information posted on the firms website, Bill Seith, Scaccia's attorney, was previously the Deputy Director of the Illinois Environmental Protection Agency. Seith, in his own words said he has "more than 10 years (experience working)at Illinois Attorney General's office, Environmental Bureau, where he worked for more than four years as chief. "As a former Deputy Director of Illinois EPA, William Seith, oversaw that Agency's Office of Community Relations."

==== Blagojevich-Madigan feud ====
The Chicago Tribune's Michael Hawthorne reported in an August 23, 2009, article "What appeared to be an obvious violation of state environmental laws became entangled in one of former Gov. Rod Blagojevich's political feuds, delaying action for months. Dozens of other cases against polluters languished as well, largely because Blagojevich and his top aides refused to refer them to his archnemesis, Atty. Gen. Lisa Madigan, a Tribune investigation found. Blagojevich and Madigan started out on amicable terms after they were elected in 2002. But EPA referrals of civil and criminal violations to the attorney general began to drop sharply in 2005, and fell to a record low of 114 in 2007, according to state records."

Hawthorne identified the feud between the Illinois Governor and the Attorney General as one of the contributing factors in the success of Crestwood's coverup. "The agency (the IL EPA) hasn't sent a criminal case to the attorney general in two years, records show."

The Tribune reporter noticed a concerning lack of prosecutions against environmental offenders. "By contrast, previous administrations on average referred about 300 environmental cases during most years since the mid-1980s. The EPA forwarded nearly 30 criminal violations to the attorney general in 2003, before the relationship soured between two of the state's top Democrats."

"Polluters didn't suddenly wise up and start following the law." wrote Hawthorne, "Instead, top EPA officials now acknowledge, the agency avoided sending cases to Madigan, whose office handles most of the legal work for state government."

"There were some issues between us and the attorney general, and that skewed those numbers," said the Illinois EPA Director Doug Scott, who was appointed by Blagojevich in 2005 and kept on by Quinn.

According to the Rockford Register Star, Scott's hometown newspaper, "Blagojevich and Doug Scott are good friends."

"As the conflict roiled, federal officials stepped in on some of the biggest environmental cases in the Chicago area."

The Tribune reporter pointed out, "For instance, the U.S. EPA is conducting a high-profile criminal investigation into Crestwood's secret use of a community well contaminated with cancer-causing chemicals, a case the Illinois EPA tried to quietly handle informally while Blagojevich was still governor."

=== September 2009 ===
==== Installation of monitor ====
State inspectors dug a monitoring well on September 14 in Crestwood to help determine how the suburb's drinking water was contaminated with toxic chemicals. Testing equipment placed underground near Crestwood's former community well, which was dismantled earlier this year, will help determine whether cancer-causing solvents seeped through cracks in bedrock into the village's water supply.

=== October 2009: new Illinois EPA test results ===
On October 9, 2009, the Illinois EPA on its website released test results for the groundwater near the well that Crestwood used to obtain drinking water for its residents "The concentration of vinyl chloride found in the bedrock's groundwater between 39 and 49 feet below ground surface averaged 55.7 parts per billion (ppb), ten times the concentration Illinois EPA found in the PWS well 3 years ago (5.4 ppb). This water contains twenty five times more of the toxic compound vinyl chloride than is allowed in drinking water by law.

=== December 2009 IDPH refuses to release cancer study ===
Tricia Krause provided Michael Hawthorne with many boxes of factual documentation. The environmental reporter for the Chicago Tribune who broke the story about Crestwood's secret and illegal use of the contaminated well in 2008 wrote in an article from December 29, 2008 that "Six months after state health officials declared their investigation of cancer rates in south suburban Crestwood was almost complete, they have yet to release the results." Even though Hawthorne and the Chicago Tribune had filed at least two FOIA requests for the details and data from the Illinois Department of Health study he was denied the information by the agency who stated "patient confidentiality" in their refusal to divulge the contents of the study. The Illinois Supreme Court has ruled in a similar case that the release of such study information does not violate patient confidentiality in any way because the patients cannot be identified by the information personally. As of December 29, 2009, the Illinois Department of Health has refused to release the study. The Tribune did not report information that the engineering company for the village of Crestwood was also involved in the debacle.

=== January 2010: Chester Stranczek's attorneys say he is not fit to testify ===
An article in the SouthTown Star newspaper on January 3, 2010 by Maura Possley reported that the attorneys for Chester Stranczek had filed a motion in front of Cook County Circuit Court Judge Mary K. Rochford to argue that the former mayor, who is now eighty years old, is not fit to testify in any of the many civil trials before the court at this time because he has Parkinsons dementia. According to the article, it is expected that the court's decision in this matter will set a precedent for all of the civil lawsuits and the anticipated criminal charges against Stranczek.

During the hearing on January 13, 2010, Chester Stranczeks attorney, Chris Gair from the Chicago firm Jenner & Block, presented as a witness Dr. Cindy Zadikoff, an assistant professor of neurology specializing in movement disorders at NorthWestern Memorial Hospital. According to Maura Possley of the SouthTown Star newspaper, "Dr. Zadikoff examined Stranczek in August and October. The doctor testified that his wife reported that Stranczek, when they returned from their Boca Raton home to their Crestwood house, would forget where the bathroom or bedroom were." The same article goes on to say that "Plaintiffs attorney Burton Weinstein ( a partner at the Chicago law firm of Baskin, Server, Berke & Weinstein ) questioned whether Stranczek could exaggerate symptoms or fake his way through her exams to try to indicate he was unfit to testify. Weinstein also referred to reports from Stranczek's former doctor of him having less-severe memory loss and said some of Stranczek's medications were known to heighten confusion or memory loss."

The Illinois competency statute merely states: "A defendant is unfit if, because of his mental or physical condition, he is unable to understand the nature and purpose of the proceedings against him or to assist in his defense."

In Dusky v. U.S., the Court held that a defendant's competency was measured by "whether he has sufficient present ability to consult with his lawyer with a reasonable degree of rational understanding—and whether he has a rational as well as factual understanding of the proceedings against him"

Maura Possley of the SouthTown Star reported that "testimony from doctors, originally expected to be finished last Friday, was scheduled to continue Feb. 9 and 10 at the Daley Center in Chicago."

Possley followed the hearings at the Daley Center closely and in an article in the SouthTown Star on March 31, 2010, detailing the closing arguments in the case she wrote "attorneys for current and former Crestwood residents argued doctors' examinations of Stranczek as late as last year indicated his competency is well within the bounds of answering to their pending complaints."

In the same article, Possley quoted attorney Larry Drury who represents Crestwood resident Joseph Marzano in a lawsuit against the village and the former mayor, "He's (Chester Stranczek) very well aware of his surroundings and what's going on in his life." Drury went on to say in his closing argument "I would call it litigation dementia that's been set up by him (Chester Stranczek)" Drury also claimed "Our position is they (Stranczek's lawyers) never sustained their burden of proof" in regards to the claims of Chester Stranczek's attorneys in the case.

In an April 14 article written in the Chicago Tribune, Michael Hawthorne said, "Former Crestwood Mayor Chester Stranczek is fit enough to be interviewed in lawsuits accusing village officials of pumping contaminated drinking water to residents for more than two decades, a judge ruled Wednesday."

According to Maura Possley in a SouthTown Star report from April 14, 2010, Crestwood's former mayor Chester Stranczek will have to testify in the civil cases against him. Possley reported "Cook County Circuit Court Judge Mary K. Rochford ruled Wednesday that the plaintiffs' attorneys can submit handwritten questions through a neutral third party to the 80-year-old Stranczek."

The Chicago Tribune said that in a lengthy 51-page decision, Cook County Circuit Judge Mary Rochford ruled "there is no evidence that a deposition would be physically harmful in any way to Stranczek." Hawthorne also wrote that "Lawyers will be allowed to submit written questions that Stranczek will answer in a two-hour videotaped interview, but the session will not count as evidence. The judge (Cook County Circuit Judge Mary Rochford) later will determine if he is competent to testify at trial." The article quoted Judge Rochford as ruling that "there is no evidence that a deposition would be physically harmful in any way to Stranczek."

=== Crestwood's legal costs ===
A January 24, 2010 investigative article in the SouthTown Star by staff writers Maura Possley and Lauren Fitzpatrick explained how the residents of Crestwood are paying the costs for the legal defense of those who stand accused of making the decision to use the contaminated Municipal Well #1 to provide drinking water to the community.

Seven months after the contaminated water story was made public the village has paid almost nine hundred thousand dollars in legal fees to seven different law firms.

"With the legal proceedings in the debacle barely beginning, the final price tag for Crestwood's defense could not only balloon into the millions, but also fall to the residents," the article said.

The majority of the costs were paid to the law firm Jenner and Block who was paid more than $300,000 in fees to represent Crestwood's former mayor Chester Stranczek in the civil proceedings in which he is named as a defendant. These costs are for the months of June through September 2009, a four-month period in which the cost of Chester Stranczek's legal fees averaged $75,000 per month.

Robert Stranczek, the current mayor of Crestwood, cost the village $205,604 in legal fees paid to the firm of Tabet, Divito and Rothstein for the four months between August and November 2009. Mayor Stranczek's legal fees averaged $50,000 a month in the four months of 2009 that records were available for.

Other firms retained by the Village of Crestwood for legal work related to its use of the contaminated municipal well include Stetler and Duffy Ltd. who was paid $161,987 from June through November 2009, Cotsirilos, Tighe and Streicher, paid $55,542 from July through November 2009, Pretzel and Stouffer, retained to represent Crestwood in insurance cases where the village's insurance companies are denying coverage in the water issue, were paid $59,507 from September through November 2009, the firm of Schain, Burney, Ross and Sitron was paid $50,820 from June through August 2009, Sosin and Arnold, the village's municipal law firm, was paid $33,128 from June through November 2009 for their work on the combined water cases and the Gensen and Gillespie firm received $9,100 in legal fees last August.

"Some of Chicago's most high-powered law firms...have been tapped by the village for its defense of Mayor Robert Stranczek and his father and former Mayor Chester Stranczek," reported the SouthTown Star newspaper.

The reporters had to make repeated Freedom of Information Act requests in order to obtain this information. Possley and Fitzpatrick wrote that the village "threw up several roadblocks" related to their FOIA requests for information ablout the legal fees that Crestwood was paying to defend its village officials in the civil lawsuits that have been filed against them.

"What the seven firms have so far done for the village is unclear" according to the January 24th investigative article "the village's municipal attorneys blacked out descriptions of services rendered on the documents and any information about hourly rates, citing attorney-client privilege", the SouthTown Star reporters wrote, and they also mentioned that "the Illinois attorney general's office is reviewing that decision."

Mayor Robert Stranczek told the Southtown Star in an interview on January 21 that the village is paying legal fees with cash reserves in the village's coffers.

"The village last year moved to conserve cash to pay some of the mounting legal bills by reneging on an annual ritual of rebating a portion of residents' property taxes" wrote Possley and Fitzpatrick, who also said that Mayor Robert Stranczek suspended the tax rebates made famous by his father, Chester Stranczek in order to pay for their legal defense.

Possley and Fitzpatrick's article did not address whether the village would have to pay for the legal defense of the officials if they are indicted and charged as criminals in the water case.

=== March 2010 ===
==== IDPH finds elevated cancer rate in Crestwood ====
In a study released on March 5, 2010, the Illinois Department of Public Health (IDPH) found "significantly elevated" levels of cancer among Crestwood residents.

The purpose of this study was not to determine whether or not the contaminated drinking water was or was not to blame for the illness' of the residents, according to the report itself it was designed to be only an "assessment of cancer incidence for Crestwood." The IDPH investigators sought only to see if there were more cases of cancer in Crestwood than they would expect statistically.

Later in the day on March 5, 2010, the IDPH issued another press release which said, "IDPH's assessment found that the types of cancer one might expect to be elevated due to exposure to the chemicals found in the Crestwood drinking water, were not found to be elevated." Because of a lack of testing however the IDPH has admitted previously that the contaminant chemicals and their levels in the well may never be known.

"The consumption of contaminated water has elevated the Kidney, Lung and Gastrointestinal cancer rates in residents of the village" according to an article on Topnews.com.

"The authors of the health assessment base their data on where a person was living at the time of diagnosis."

The study, conducted by the Illinois State Cancer Registry, a division of the state Department of Public Health, analyzed 952 cancer cases from 1994 to 2006.

The IDPH report did not implicate the contaminated municipal well or exposure to the village's contaminated water as a reason for the elevated incidence of cancer in Crestwood. It also did not rule out exposure to the carcinogenically contaminated public drinking water supply as a factor for the higher cancer rates of Crestwood residents.

Kidney cancer in males in Crestwood was almost double the level researchers had expected to find.

Lung cancer in males and females in Crestwood was 35 percent higher than what the researchers expected to find.

Oral cavity and pharynx cancers in Crestwood men were 73 percent higher than what researchers expected to find.

Esophagus cancer in Crestwood males was twice as high as the state researchers expected it to be.

"The study verifies what Crestwood residents have been saying for decades, according to Chicago attorney Mike Mertz, who represents 20 individuals who claim Crestwood's water supply triggered their illnesses" "This report confirms the anecdotal evidence that residents have been saying for years, that there's a link between the incidents of cancer and the fact that Crestwood was putting a known carcinogen into its water," Mertz commented in the SouthTown Star article. He went on to point out to SouthTown Star reporter Amy Lee that "It confirms much of what we expected, but probably underreports the striking cancer cluster that exists in Crestwood."

Michael Hawthorne wrote an article on March 3, 2010 in the Chicago Tribune and noted "The report's conclusions are a sharp contrast to statements made by some state officials after the disclosure of the tainted well. Last April, Doug Scott, director of the Illinois EPA, said, "the public's health never was at risk" because the well water was diluted with treated Lake Michigan water. That statement has been frequently repeated by Crestwood officials."

In the March 5 SouthTown Star article, reporter Amy Lee interviewed water quality expert David De John who said, "It's flat-out disturbing because, as they note in the report, they have not seen all these cases come to reality, we have not seen the end of these illnesses."

The IDPH report only considers cancer cases diagnosed up to the year 2006 and only those where the initial diagnosis was made while the patient resided in Crestwood. IDPH officials have given no reason why the study did not take cases into consideration from the last four years.

The Health Department's report did state that "the extension of exposure until 2007 could suggest that some cancers associated with the exposure might have not yet occurred."

A "fact sheet" issued by the IDPH accompanying the study released on March 5, 2010, said, "cancer does not develop immediately after contact with a cancer-causing agent (carcinogen). The time between the exposure to a carcinogen and medical diagnosis of cancer, called latency period, is often 10 to 20 years."

==== Residents respond to IDPH study ====
Frank Caldario, diagnosed with kidney cancer at thirty years old, commented to the Chicago Tribune, "I can't help but wonder if what happened to me had something to do with the water." Caldario didn't smoke and had lived in Crestwood since 1993.

"Of course there's a concern. If I said it wasn't in the back of my head, I'd be lying. You don't want to think something bad could happen from just drinking water", said Dominic Covone, 37, a resident of about six years.

"This is what we've been asking for," said Steven Nelson, a Crestwood resident who helped organize a Facebook group to spread information about the contaminated well. "What's been missing is the hard data about any illnesses in the community."

"We are dealing with a situation where we have known exposure," said Ken Runkle, a state health department toxicologist. "That means we can view these elevated cancer levels in a different light."

"Melaney Arnold with the Illinois Department of Public Health says there are too many variables to definitively link cancer with the tainted water" according to a report by Chicago Public Radio which also interviewed an "unidentified" village official who said, "the report strengthens Crestwood's case that the contaminated well is not to blame for the illnesses."

The results of the state study were "flat-out disturbing," according to David De John, a water quality expert who owns Enviro Science Products in Oak Forest and wrote What's in My Water?, a book that compiled various water quality reports from a range of public and private agencies. While he doesn't believe the water ingested by Crestwood residents was the sole cause of these instances of cancer, De John believes it was likely a factor, he said in an interview with a reporter from the SouthTown Star.

"Most shocking," De John said in the same interview, "was the data showing much higher rates of cancers of the oral cavity and pharynx esophagus in Crestwood than researchers had anticipated." Researchers found twice as many cases of esophageal cancer as they expected and nearly twice as many cases of oral cavity cancer.

Some residents of Crestwood claimed that the federal government was using "Gestapo" tactics in the investigation against the current and former mayors Robert and Chester Stranczek.

==== Crestwood's water director is fired ====
On March 13, 2010, Maura Possley of the SouthTown Star reported that Frank Scaccia, Crestwood's water director, had been fired. "Mayor Robert Stranczek confirmed Friday that public works director Frank Scaccia was terminated, but the mayor refused to elaborate about why he was dismissed" Possley reported. After the Crestwood case; Maura Possley eventually became Madigans spokesperson.

==== IDPH open meeting on health assessment ====
The Illinois Department of Public Health announced that they would host an open meeting on health assessment on March 13, 2010. The meeting was to be held at the Trinity Christian College's Ozinga Chapel Auditorium at 6601 W. College Drive in Palos Heights Illinois at 2 pm.

"Crestwood residents who unknowingly drank contaminated water for years unleashed a wave of criticism Saturday toward public health officials who were there to explain a new study that showed cancer rates are 'significantly elevated' in the south suburb", wrote Jared Hopkins in the Chicago Tribune.

The meeting was attended by "more than 100 people." Bill Gannon, a resident of Crestwood since 1972, told the panel on stage, "What kind of whitewash is this...these aren't facts...these are just part-time facts put in where you feel like putting them in." Howard Smith, a Manteno resident who worked at ComEd in Crestwood for almost 30 years, asked health officials about possibly including people in the cancer study who didn't live in the village but worked there for decades. Smith himself has kidney disease. Linda Malin, a Crestwood resident with Parkinson's disease said, "I believe (drinking the water for) 15 years has an effect on you."

According to Becky Schlikerman of the SouthTown Star, "Other diseases weren't studied." She reported that "officials from the Illinois Department of Health, the U.S. Department of Health and Human Services Agency for Toxic Substances and Disease Registry and the Illinois Environmental Protection Agency didn't have answers... about kidney disease, gastrointestinal diseases and neurological diseases."

Health officials could not say that the contaminated water from Crestwood's municipal well had caused any illness. They also said that they could not say the water did not cause any of the cancers identified. The officials said that they would continue to monitor the incidence of cancer in the village, and that in many cases the cancers caused by contaminated water may take ten to twenty years to develop.
