= Pacific Seafood =

American seafood company

- Type: Private
- Founded: 1941
- Headquarters: Clackamas, Oregon
- Key people: Frank Dulcich, CEO
- Products: Seafood, shellfish, meat, poultry, and assorted deli items
- Website: www.pacificseafood.com

Pacific Seafood is one of the largest seafood companies in North America. The company launched in 1941 as a small, fresh seafood retail operation in Portland, Oregon, United States. The family-owned business expanded to become one of the largest vertically integrated seafood processing and distribution companies in the United States. Pacific's president and CEO, Frank Dulcich, is the grandson of the company's founder, also named Frank Dulcich. Pacific Seafood has over 2500 employees and is headquartered in Clackamas, Oregon.

== Scope ==
Pacific processes seafood products from Alaska to Mexico, has facilities in seven Western states and participates in the global seafood trade market. It is a member of the West Coast Seafood Processors Association and is active in supporting fisheries awarded Marine Stewardship Council eco-labels.

== Environment and food safety ==
Some of Pacific's facilities have earned British Retail Consortium (BRC) certification for their protective measures, including separation of raw and cooked products and positive airflow to prevent airborne pathogens. The company collaborated with Georgia-Pacific to use Greenshield, a proprietary moisture-resistant coating for boxes that is 100% recyclable. Pacific has also implemented a waste reduction program that diverts more than 600,000 pounds of material from landfills every year.

== Honors ==
Pacific Seafood was named "Oregon's 10th Most Admired Company" in the agriculture and forest products category by readers of the Portland Business Journal in 2009 and was similarly honored in 2007. The Oregon Restaurant Association named Frank Dulcich as Purveyor of the Year at its annual awards banquet in 2008.

== Legal cases ==
In 2002, the Pacific Surimi unit of the company pleaded no contest to charges of theft stemming from a practice of consistently exaggerating the "weigh back" amount, which is the portion of each catch deemed unsuitable for processing. They paid out $800,000 in damages to the aggrieved parties.

In 2010, fishermen in Oregon filed an antitrust class action lawsuit against Pacific, alleging that the company used unethical tactics based on their share of the market to drive down payouts to fishermen in Oregon, Washington, and California. Some fishermen compared Pacific's effect on the market to the Wal-Mart Effect in retail sales. However, on March 1, 2011, U.S. District Court Judge Owen Panner said the plaintiffs' attorney, Mike Haglund, failed to prove that Pacific has used its huge market share to suppress prices paid to fishermen. "The evidence presented... does not support plaintiffs' allegation," Panner wrote in the ruling. "Instead, the evidence indicates that since 2006 defendants' combined operations have expanded the market for whiting. Each year since 2006 (other than 2009, when there was a worldwide recession), defendants have been paying fishermen significantly higher prices for whiting, with record prices paid in 2008."

In March 2023, a commercial crab fisherman named Brand Little filed a class-action price-fixing lawsuit against Pacific, alleging that he and 1,400 other crabbers in California, Oregon, and Washington were forced to accept lower prices for crab due to anticompetitive behavior by Pacific involving a "multipronged strategy of monopsonization, coercion, dumping, and secret deals." In May 2023, Pacific filed a motion to dismiss the lawsuit. In May 2024, U.S. Magistrate Court Judge Alex G. Tse granted Pacific's motion to dismiss the case, ruling that Little had not sufficiently proven his claims, but giving Little the opportunity to amend most of his claims by 20 August 2024.
