= 2009 Sidekick data loss =

2009 data outage caused by server failure

The Sidekick data outage of 2009 resulted in an estimated 800,000 smartphone users in the United States temporarily losing personal data, such as emails, address books and photos from their mobile handsets. The computer servers holding the data were run by Microsoft. The brand of phone affected was the Danger Hiptop, also known as the "Sidekick", and were connected via the T-Mobile cellular network. At the time, it was described as the biggest disaster in cloud computing history.

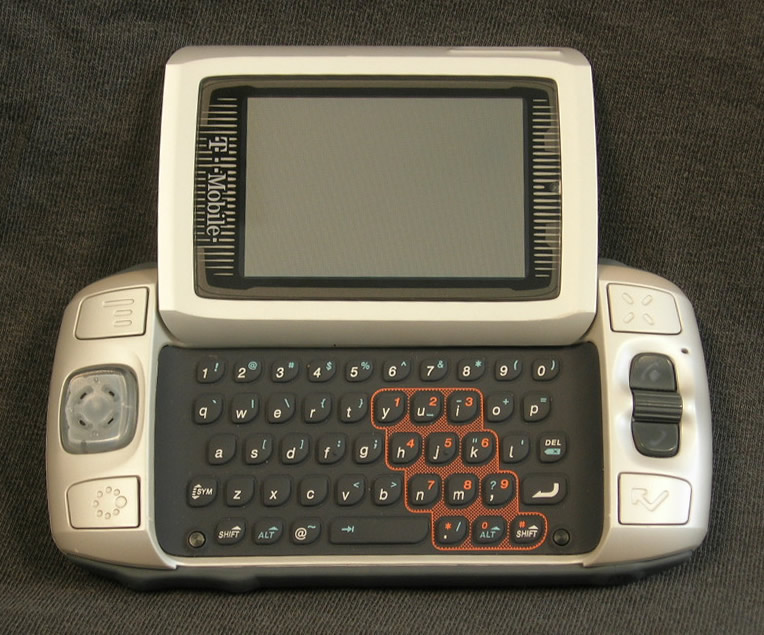
T-Mobile Sidekick 2

The Sidekick smartphones were originally produced by Danger, Inc., a company that was bought by Microsoft in February 2007. After the acquisition, the former Danger staff were then absorbed into the Mobile Communications Business (MCB) of the Entertainment and Devices Division at Microsoft, where they worked on a future Microsoft mobile phone platform known as Project Pink. However, most of the ex-Danger employees soon left Microsoft to pursue other things. Microsoft took over the running of the data servers, and its data centers were hosting the customers' data at the time it was lost.

On Friday, October 2, 2009, T-Mobile Sidekick phone users started noticing data service outages occurring. The outages lasted approximately two weeks. On October 10, 2009, T-Mobile announced that personal information stored on Sidekick phones would be permanently lost, which turned out to be incorrect.

According to the Financial Times, Microsoft said the data center it acquired from Danger 18 months previously had not been "updated to run on Microsoft technology." A company statement said the mishap was due to "a confluence of errors from a server failure that hurt its main and backup databases supporting Sidekick users." The Register reported that the precipitating event was remedial work performed by contractor Hitachi Data Systems on Danger's Storage area network. T-Mobile blamed Microsoft for the loss of data.

The incident caused a public loss of confidence in the concept of cloud computing, which had been plagued by a series of outages and data losses in 2009. It also was problematic for Microsoft, which at the time was trying to convince corporate clients to use its cloud computing services, such as Azure and My Phone.

On October 14, 2009, a class action lawsuit was launched against Microsoft and T-Mobile. The lawsuit alleged:

T-Mobile and Microsoft promised to safeguard the most important data their customers possess and then apparently failed to follow even the most basic data protection principles. What they did is unthinkable in this day and age.

The class action lawsuit was settled in 2011, with affected users compensated with a "$35 T-Mobile gift card, a $17.50 check payment, or up to 12 free downloadable items."

On October 15, after a 24x7 recovery effort led by Glenn Beeswanger, Mark Hydar and Alan Levin, Microsoft said they had been able to recover most or all data and would begin to restore them.

Microsoft CEO, Steve Ballmer disputed whether there had been a data loss at all, instead describing it as an outage. Ballmer said, “It is not clear there was data loss". However, he said the incident was "not good" for Microsoft.

Even before this data loss, Danger had marketed an application for Windows computers which would back up all Sidekick data onto a user's computer and also to allow changes to be made and then re-downloaded to the Sidekick in real-time. Users who had this backup storage option were able to save all of their data. In the United States, T-Mobile marketed this application for a one-time charge of $10. Immediately after the data had been restored to all their users, T-Mobile incorporated the Sidekick storage website with the regular T-Mobile backup site. The application to the user's personal computer, the Danger backup site, and the T-Mobile backup site could then be synchronized together.
