= YTB International =

American multi-level marketing company

- Type: Private
- Industry: Travel
- Founded: 2001; 25 years ago Alton, Illinois, U.S.
- Founder: J. Lloyd “Coach” Tomer, Scott Tomer and Kim Sorensen
- Headquarters: Wood River, Illinois
- Number of employees: 120 (2010)
- Website: www.ytb.com

YTB International, known as YTB Global Travel, Your Travel Biz or YTB, is a multi-level marketing business through owner-affiliated websites offering travels, excursions, and lodgings. The company was funded in 2001 by J. Lloyd Tomer, Scott Tomer, and Kim Sorensen. The company is currently owned by Sam Hathi.

Between 2006 and 2009 the company was the subject of several lawsuits and investigations in California, Illinois, and Rhode Island that alleged the company was a pyramid scheme and had used deceptive marketing. A subsequent decline in revenues led to the company's bankruptcy in 2013, after which it was purchased by Jamraval, Inc. and reorganized under the name YTB Global Travel.

Other YTB subsidiaries include YTB Travel Network, Inc., Zamzuu, Inc., and REZconnect Technologies, Inc. (2004–2009). YTB is based in Wood River, Illinois. International subsidiaries operate in the U.S., Puerto Rico, the Bahamas, Bermuda, and Canada.

== History ==
J. Lloyd "Coach" Tomer, his son Scott Tomer, and Kim Sorensen launched YTB in 2001 in Alton, Illinois.

In 2004, YTB's founders bought interest in a related company, REZconnect Technologies, and increased their marketing budget. Members were then recruited through videos of successful salespeople.

In 2007 Royal Caribbean stopped doing business with YTB. They described the company as a "card mill", an industry term for businesses that sell "travel agent identification cards" to customers, promising travel discounts or other perks and a commission on any sales of these kits to other consumers.

In 2008 the company was sued by California Attorney General Jerry Brown. An out-of-court settlement required changes to the company's business model and generated a decrease in membership attributed to bad publicity. Later that year, YTB laid off 17 employees. In 2008 the company's revenues were $44.8 million. YTB said its independent auditor at the end of 2008 expressed "substantial doubt about our company's ability to continue as a going concern," a sentiment the company later echoed.

In 2009 the company operated at a loss of $1.9 million for the first three months of the year. Revenue in that quarter dropped 49% to $21.8 million and then to $18 million in the second quarter. The number of the company's paying members declined from a high in April 2008 of 138,000 to 60,414 in mid-2009. This decline in revenue led the company to sell several commercial properties, including the company's Learjet. That year YTB also sold RezConnect to company officers. Under the terms of the sale, YTB would indemnify the new owners for any YTB-related liabilities.

In 2011 the company sold its headquarters building and adjoining property for $7.6 million. In October 2011, a newly formed company, Sixth Scott LLC, began purchasing YTB Travel Network from YTB International. The company was relaunched as First Alliance Travel in 2012.

On February 1, 2012, founder J. Kim Sorenson died at the age of 62. In March 2012 the YTB announced a plan to merge with LTS Nutraceutical, another MLM firm. In May, the company began a major restructuring and stated that the president and CEO, Robert Van Patton, had submitted his resignation. In September, YTB called off the merger and announced that founder and chairman Scott Tomer was resigning.

On March 1, 2013, YTB International filed for Chapter 11 protection in federal court in St. Louis. The company filed its last quarterly earnings report in the third quarter of 2011, although the company later announced that the report contained errors.

On October 11, 2013, YTB completed the sale of its assets to Chicago-based businessman Sam Hathi of Jamraval, Inc. Since being acquired YTB has operated as YTB Global Travel. As of March 2, 2015 the company ceased enrolling new agents and representatives but still provides resources for existing members.

As of March 2, 2015 YTB ceased enrolling new Referring Travel Agents.

== Lawsuits ==
In August 2008 California Attorney General Jerry Brown sued the company for $25 million, alleging it to be a pyramid scheme, among other claims. The Illinois Better Business Bureau and Illinois Attorney General Lisa Madigan joined Brown in investigating the company. Brown's lawsuit indicates that 45,000 sales reps earned an average of about $90 in 2007 and of their 200,000 total agents, some 125,000 earned nothing and 37,000 earned less than $39. On May 14, 2009, California authorities settled their suit with YTB for $1 million. As part of the settlement, YTB agreed to restructure, possibly hastening a transition to a franchise system. That same day, Madigan filed a similar suit in Illinois. Brown said the agreement would end the sale of personalized websites that cost $450 to purchase and $50 per month to maintain.

Around the same time, several former YTB agents filed a class-action lawsuit that alleged the company was an illegal pyramid scheme. The lawsuit says that the company "claims to sell travel services, but said company's main business is inducing others to become travel agents." YTB responded by stating that it intends to "vigorously defend the case," and the case was dismissed in July 2009 on the grounds that non-residents of Illinois could not pursue the matter under Illinois law. Illinois Attorney General Lisa Madigan, after her office and the Illinois Better Business Bureau, received more than 150 complaints about the company, partnered with Brown's office in his state's investigation of the company. The BBB indicated that 80% of YTB revenue came from new agent recruitment, with agents earning an average of $111 per year, almost $400 less than the initial $499 sign-up price. In May 2011, it was announced that YTB had reached a settlement with the state of Illinois, paying $150,000 in restitution. No admission nor denial of guilt was made in the settlement.

In 2007, YTB was also investigated for similar allegations in Rhode Island.

In defense of YTB, chief executive Scott Tomer said, "We are wholly confident that our business model will withstand scrutiny, and look forward to setting the record straight in court."
