= R2C2 =

American company

R2C2, Inc., owned by Rusty Carroll, is a company located in Carbondale, Illinois, that operates a group of at least nine sites that sold term papers. According to his attorney, they collectively offered a total of 200,000 to 300,000 papers. The sites include: DoingMyHomework.com, FreeforEssays.com, and FreeforTermPapers.com.

Carroll and his company had been previously sued by Blue Macellari at Duke University for copyright infringement, false designation of origin, consumer fraud and deception. That suit was settled in 2006.

== Class action lawsuit ==
In 2006, a class action suit was placed against the company and the owner in the U.S. District Court for the Southern District of Illinois, Chad Weidner, Karolien Walravens et al. v. Rusty Carroll, and R2C2, charging them with copyright violation for reselling papers written by other authors. On January 11, 2010 David Herndon, chief judge of the district court, ruled that Carroll and his company caused continued "irreparable harm" to an indeterminate number of authors. The plaintiffs are being represented pro bono by McDermott Will & Emery. On February 1, 2010, he further ruled that he would order the site closed unless the owner could prove he has permission from the papers' authors, but would not prohibit him from selling custom-written papers. Many other sites engage in that practice, although at least 17 states prohibit the practice by law.

== What others have said about the case ==
Plaintiff attorney Eric J. Conn said, “We'd like to stop this practice, or get as close to stopping it as we can.” Added associate Rita Weeks, “In the end, our perseverance did pay off.” The named plaintiff in the case, Dr. Chad Weidner, Assistant Professor at University College Roosevelt in the Netherlands, added his personal perspective: "Real research is both time-consuming and difficult. To think that there is some kind of quick fix, be it a paper sold online, a paper borrowed from a peer or creative rewriting of an academic's work, is just unacceptable."

According to Darby Dickenson, Dean of the Stetson University School of Law, "The opinion does help the public see some of the sharp and shady practices of at least some of these companies. The fact that someone was willing to take on the company and litigate for several years is significant."

== Recent case developments ==
In September 2010, the following statement was posted on Carroll's numerous term-paper websites:

"Your rights may be affected by a class action settlement regarding the unauthorized copying and distribution of copyrighted works on websites operated by Rusty Carroll and R2C2, Inc., including doingmyhomework.com, 123schoolwork.com, learnessays.com, freefortermpapers.com, and freeforessays.com.
Authors Chad Weidner and Karolien Walravens filed a class action lawsuit against Rusty Carroll and R2C2, Inc. ("Defendants") in the United States District Court for the Southern District of Illinois on October 6, 2006, alleging violations of the Copyright Act on behalf of themselves and a class of individuals similarly situated.

What Does Settlement Provide? The settlement, if court-approved, enjoins Defendants from operating or participating in the ownership or operation of any website that hosts works of authorship and provides for a judgment in the amount of $300,000 against Defendants. Plaintiffs agree to stay the execution of the $300,000 judgment so long as Defendants continue to comply with the terms of a permanent injunction requiring the permanent shut down of all of Defendants’ Term Paper Websites. The settlement also provides that Defendants pay $20,000 to be paid over the course of 7 years to cover:
- (1) notice to class members of the settlement;
- (2) reasonable attorneys’ costs and expenses in bringing this lawsuit; and
- (3) a $2,500 payment to each of the named class representatives.

Who is Included?
The settlement class includes "all persons or entities who are the owners of the materials offered to the public through Carroll’s Term Paper Websites" except those individuals who both have the legal authority to grant and who granted Defendants proper authorization to use their materials.

What Should I Do?
You do not have the right to exclude yourself from the settlement in this case. The case was certified under Fed. R. Civ. P. 23(b)(1) as a "non-opt out" class action. Therefore, you will be bound by any judgments or orders that are entered in this Action and, if the settlement is approved, you will be deemed to have released Defendants Rusty Carroll and R2C2, Inc. from all claims that were or could have been asserted in this case or otherwise included in the release in the settlement, other than your right to obtain the relief provided to you, if any, by the settlement. Although you cannot opt out of the settlement agreement, you can object to the settlement and ask the Court not to approve the settlement in its current form.

The Court will hold a hearing in this case, Weidner, et al. v. Carroll, et al., Case No. 06-782-DRH-PMF, at 2:00 PM CST on January 20, 2011, to consider whether to approve the settlement agreement. You may ask to appear at the hearing, but it is not required."

== What others have said ==
The court decision has brought attention to the issue of term paper mills and academic integrity: "Academic performance in its pure form is exercised from the student-outward. Hopefully this sets an example to other websites who may provide a similar service." Another respondent added: "Why is he fined only $20,000?" A poster called jbarman was even more direct: "You must be kidding. Over and above the copyright issues, this is a guy who contributed to the widespread and growing cheating and plagiarism problems that take so much of our collective time as educators." Walkerst asserts that a term paper website "facilitates plagiarism, fraud, and more".
