= Lieff Cabraser =

American law firm

- Headquarters: San Francisco
- No. of offices: 4
- No. of attorneys: 75
- Date founded: 1972; 54 years ago
- Founder: Robert L. Lieff
- Website: www.lieffcabraser.com

Lieff Cabraser is an American plaintiffs' law firm headquartered in San Francisco. The firm was founded in 1972 by Robert L. Lieff. Elizabeth Cabraser became a partner in 1981.

Elizabeth Cabraser is a prominent gay leader, and the firm has been active on gay rights issues, most prominently 2008 California Proposition 8. The firm has also been involved in antitrust litigation against several Silicon Valley firms and has supported donor disclosure laws.

== Lawsuits ==
The firm was a leader against 2008 California Proposition 8, a California ballot proposition and state constitutional amendment intended to ban same-sex marriage.

In 2014, Lieff Cabraser represented four plaintiffs who sued Apple Inc., Google, Intel, and Adobe Inc. in an antitrust lawsuit. The case was set to go to trial, but the companies agreed to settle for $324 million. In a highly unusual move, one of the four plaintiffs wrote to the judge in the case, asking her to reject the deal negotiated by his own lawyers. Michael Devine said "The class wants a chance at real justice. We want our day in court." Devine said "he told his lawyers that he found the settlement inadequate as it was being negotiated but they ignored him." Lieff Cabraser and Joseph Saveri Law Firm would have benefited from the proposed settlement by making up to $75 million in fees while class members would have received a maximum of several thousand dollars each. Judge Lucy Koh agreed with Devine and rejected the initial settlement offer. The New York Times wrote that "Judge Koh appeared annoyed that the lawyers for the class were taking the easy way out by settling rather than going to trial." In 2015, a new settlement of $425 million was proposed, with the lawyers' share of the settlement as much as 25%. The settlement was approved in September 2015.

In 2017, Lieff Cabraser brought a suit against Google, alleging that the company systematically pays women less than men.

In 2018, Lieff Cabraser represented 56 U.S. cities and counties who opposed President Trump's efforts to use executive authority to withhold federal funding from sanctuary cities that failed to cooperate with federal immigration authorities.

In March 2021, Lieff Cabraser filed an amicus brief spearheaded by Democratic U.S. Senator Sheldon Whitehouse in Americans for Prosperity Foundation v. Bonta. The amicus brief supported the state of California in its demand for tax documents identifying donors to nonprofit organizations. Opponents of the state's actions included the American Civil Liberties Union and the NAACP Legal Defense and Educational Fund, who argued that California's donor disclosure demands "infringe the First Amendment right to associational privacy, in light of the state's demonstrated inability to maintain the confidentiality of that information." In July 2021, the Supreme Court ruled in a 6–3 decision that California's requirement burdened the donors' First Amendment rights and was not narrowly tailored, and thus invalid.

In February 2022, Lieff Cabraser lost an appeal of sanctions it received after a judge found it and other firms behind a $300 million class action settlement with State Street Corporation had engaged in misconduct while pursuing fees. Lieff Cabraser was found to have been "culpably careless" in misrepresenting typical fees in order to justify $60 million in attorneys' fees in a class action lawsuit.

== Affiliations ==
In 2022, Lieff Cabraser was a founding member of the Legal Alliance for Reproductive Rights, a coalition of United States law firms offering free legal services to people seeking and providing abortions in the wake of Dobbs v. Jackson Women's Health Organization, which overruled Roe v. Wade.
