= Marriage in South Africa =

In South Africa, marriage exists in a number of different forms, as a result of the diversity of religions and cultures in the country. A man in South Africa may have more than one spouse but a South African woman may only have one spouse.

Historically, the legal definition of marriage, derived from the Roman-Dutch law, was limited to monogamous marriages between opposite-sex couples. However, this has evolved considerably in recent years.

Since 1998, the law has recognised marriages, including polygynous marriages, conducted under African customary law, as well as religious laws such as Islamic law.

In 2006, the South African constitutional court ruled in favour of recognizing same-sex marriage. South Africa was the world's 5th country to legalize same-sex marriage, in keeping with the nation's social democratic constitution and politics.

South Africa is currently the only country in the world to recognise both polygamy and same-sex marriages, albeit not in conjunction. South Africa outlawed marital rape in 1993.

The number of individuals in South Africa who are choosing to get married or cohabitate as partners is declining. According to the 2022 census, 62.2% of South Africans had never been married - an increase of 8.2% compared to the 2011 census. In 2022, 24% of South Africans were legally married, compared to 29.9% in 2011 - a 5.9% decrease in 10 years.

== Marrying ==
There are three different laws under which a marriage may be formed in South Africa:

- The Marriage Act, 1961, which allows for the solemnisation of a civil or religious marriage between a man and a woman.
- The Recognition of Customary Marriages Act, 1998, which allows for the registration of marriages under African customary law. Some communities' customary law allows for polygynous marriages, and these are recognised subject to certain conditions.
- The Civil Union Act, 2006, which allows for the solemnisation of a civil or religious marriage or a civil partnership between two people regardless of gender. The legal consequences of a marriage under the Civil Union Act are the same as those of a marriage under the Marriage Act.

A person may only be married under one of these laws at a time, except that a couple in a monogamous customary marriage can contract a marriage with each other under the Marriage Act.

Marriages under the Marriage Act and the Civil Union Act must be solemnized by a marriage officer and in the presence of two witnesses. Magistrates are ex officio marriage officers, and civil servants (in practise usually officials of the Department of Home Affairs) are appointed as marriage officers by the Minister of Home Affairs. The Minister may also appoint ministers of religion as marriage officers; they cannot solemnize marriages under the Civil Union Act unless their denomination has applied to the Minister to be registered to do so.

The spouses must be over 18 to form a valid marriage, except that a girl over 15 may marry under the Marriage Act with the consent of her parents. A person may not marry his or her direct ancestor or descendant, sibling, uncle or aunt, niece or nephew, or the ancestor or descendant of an ex-spouse.

== Financial consequences ==
There are several marital property regimes which can apply to a marriage in South Africa. By default, if a couple does not sign an antenuptial contract before the marriage, they are married in community of property, which means that all of their assets and liabilities (even those acquired before the marriage) are merged into a joint estate, in which each spouse has an undivided half-share. Each spouse has equal power to deal independently with the estate, except that certain major transactions require the consent of both spouses.

Spouses can marry under a different property regime by executing an antenuptial contract before a notary public; to be effective against third parties, the contract must also be registered in a deeds registry within three months from the date of execution. An antenuptial contract excludes community of property and community of profit or loss, so that each spouse maintains a separate estate with separate assets and liabilities.

The contract can also make specific provision for the handling of property and its distribution after death or divorce. In marriages contracted since the Matrimonial Property Act, 1984 with an antenuptial contract, the accrual system will apply to the marriage unless it is specifically excluded by the contract. Under the accrual system, the spouses' property remains separate for the duration of the marriage, but at the time of death or divorce their estates are adjusted so that the difference in "accrual" between the two estates is divided equally.

"Accrual" is the increase of the net value of the estate from the marriage's commencement to its dissolution. However, the accrual system does not apply if one of the estates is insolvent at the time the marriage ends. In calculating the adjustment, the minimum value an estate of a party can have is zero; negative estate values are not taken into account.

The financial consequences of marriages under African customary law entered into before 2000 are governed by the applicable customary law. In those entered into after 2000, if the marriage is monogamous the same rules apply as for civil marriages. If the marriage involves a second or subsequent wife, the law requires the husband to apply to court to approve a written contract that will regulate the future matrimonial property system of his marriages.

The doctrine of the marital power, which gave the husband exclusive control over the estate in a marriage in community of property, and the power to administer the wife's estate in a marriage out of community of property, was abolished in 1984 for all future marriages, and in 1993 for all marriages.

== Divorce ==
South African law provides for no-fault divorce based on the "irretrievable breakdown" of the marital relationship. The courts may accept any relevant evidence of breakdown, but the law specifically mentions one year's separation, adultery, and habitual criminality as factors which may prove irretrievable breakdown. A divorce may also be obtained on the grounds of incurable mental illness for two years, or continuous unconsciousness for six months.

Divorce cases are heard in the High Courts or, since 2010, in the regional civil magistrates' courts. A court has the jurisdiction to hear a divorce if either of the spouses is legally domiciled within the geographical jurisdiction of the court, or if either spouse is "ordinarily resident" (i.e. normally lives in) the jurisdiction and has been ordinarily resident in South Africa for at least a year.

Divorce of same-sex couples is subject to the same law as divorce of opposite-sex couples. Divorce for marriages under customary law is also subject to the civil law, with certain modifications to account for the fact that customary marriages may be polygynous.

== Legislative developments ==
In September 2025, the Constitutional Court of South Africa ruled that husbands can take the surname of their wives, overturning a law that barred them from doing so. In a victory for two couples who brought the case, the court ruled that the law was a "colonial import" that amounted to gender-based discrimination.

The two couples argued that the existing law was archaic and patriarchal, and violated equality rights enshrined in the constitution that South Africa adopted at the end of apartheid in 1994. They successfully challenged the law in a lower court, but subsequently asked the Constitutional Court to confirm its ruling.

Neither the Minister of Home Affairs, Leon Schreiber, nor the Minister of Justice and Constitutional Development, Mamoloko Kubayi, opposed the couples' application. The Ministers agreed that the law was outdated. A legal body, the Free State Society of Advocates, supported the two couples.

The Society argued that by restricting a man's right to assume their wife's surname, the law perpetuated harmful stereotypes, as it denied men a choice that was available to women.

The South African Parliament will now have to amend the Births and Deaths Registration Act, along with its regulations, for the ruling to take effect.

== Statistics ==
The percentage of single people in South Africa is increasing, according to census data. Furthermore, fewer people are choosing to live together. Recorded marital statuses of South Africans from Statistics South Africa releases are in the table below.

Marital status in South African censuses
Marital status	2011	2022
Never Married	54%	62.2%
Cohabiting as partners	9.2%	7.8%
Legally married	29.9%	24%
Separated, but still legally married	0.8%	0.4%
Divorced	1.5%	1.6%
Widowed	4.6%	4%
Total	100%	100%

In 2020, a significant majority (58.5%) of marriages registered were solemnized by Department of Home Affairs marriage officers. A further 29.7% were solemnized by "religious rites". The solemnization rite was not specified in 11.8% of marriages. Of the marriages of South African citizens and permanent residents registered in 2020, 0,4% were solemnized outside the borders of South Africa, but subsequently registered in South Africa.

=== Marital status by province ===
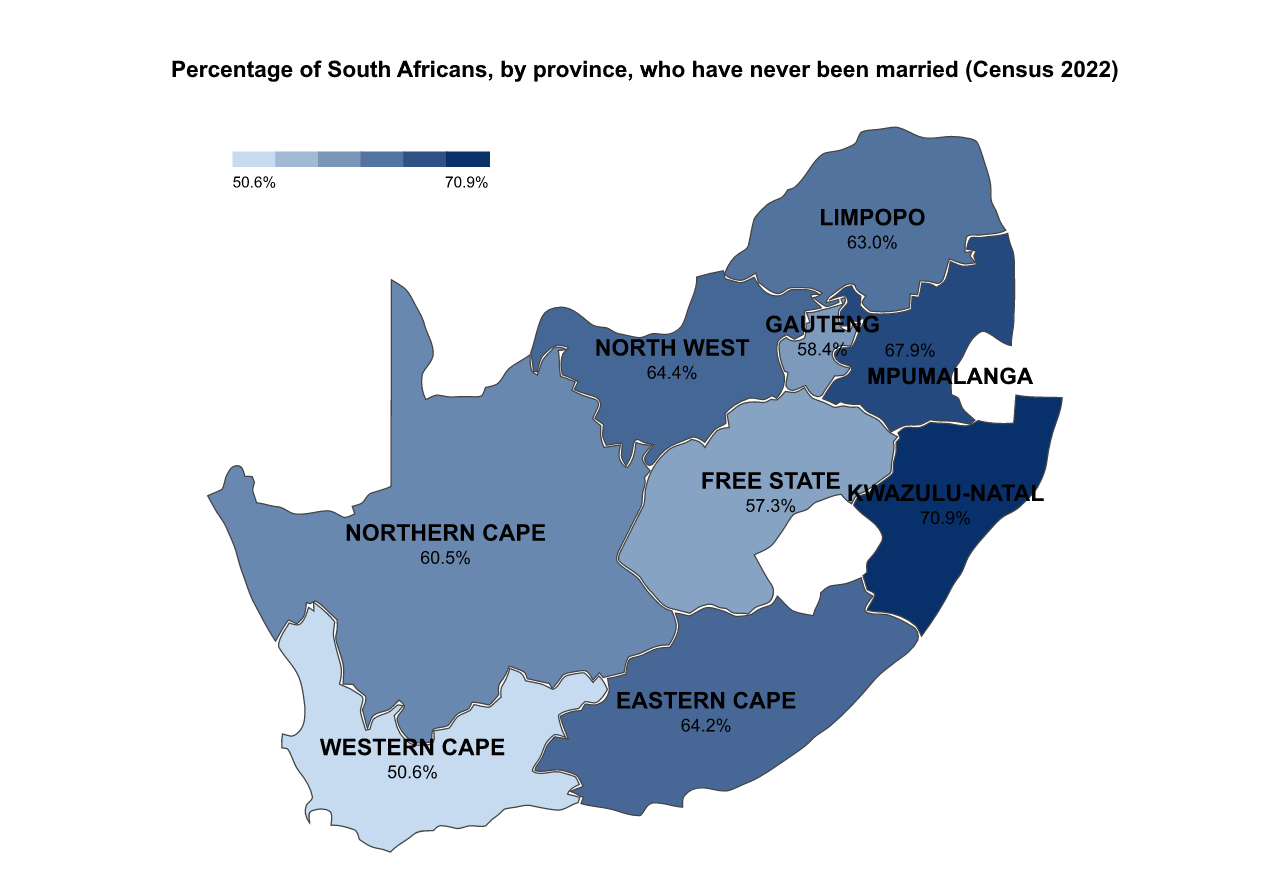
Map showing percentage of South Africans in each province who have never been married, according to Census 2022 data by Stats SA

The 2022 Census South Africa percentage distribution of the South African population by province and marital status can be found in the table below.

The range is quite broad at just over 20% difference between the minimum and maximum values. The Western Cape has the lowest percentage of those who have never been married, at 50.6%, while KwaZulu-Natal has the highest percentage, at 70.9%.

Percentage distribution of the SA population by province and marital status (Census 2022)
Province	Never married (%)	Cohabiting as partners (%)	Legally married (%)	Separated, but still legally married (%)	Divorced (%)	Widowed (%)	Total
Eastern Cape	64.2	4.0	24.0	0.6	1.5	5.7	100
Free State	57.3	9.6	24.4	0.7	1.9	6.1	100
Gauteng	58.4	10.7	25.0	0.5	2.1	3.3	100
KwaZulu-Natal	70.9	4.8	19.8	0.3	1.0	3.2	100
Limpopo	63.0	8.3	23.4	0.3	0.8	4.2	100
Mpumalanga	67.9	8.7	19.3	0.3	0.8	3.0	100
Northern Cape	60.5	9.0	23.1	0.5	1.8	5.1	100
North West	64.4	8.7	21.0	0.4	1.5	4.0	100
Western Cape	50.6	7.8	33.8	0.6	3.0	4.2	100
South Africa	62.2	7.8	24.0	0.4	1.6	4.0	100

== See also ==
- Divorce in South Africa
- Polygamy in South Africa
- Same-sex marriage in South Africa
- Civil partnership in South Africa
- Religion in South Africa
- South African family law
- Texts on Wikisource:
  - Marriage Act, 1961
  - Recognition of Customary Marriages Act, 1998
  - Civil Union Act, 2006
