= Marriage Bill, 2023 =

Parliament of South Africa
- Long title: Bill to provide for the recognition of marriages; to provide for the requirements for monogamous and polygamous marriages; to provide for designation of marriage officers; to provide for solemnisation and registration of marriages; to provide for proprietary consequences and the dissolution of marriages; to provide for offences and penalties and to provide for matters incidental thereto.
- Territorial extent: South Africa
- Considered by: National Assembly

Legislative history
- Bill citation: B43—2023
- Introduced by: Aaron Motsoaledi, Minister of Home Affairs
- Introduced: 13 December 2023
- Committee responsible: Home Affairs

Repeals
- Marriage Act, 1961; Recognition of Customary Marriages Act, 1998; Civil Union Act, 2006
- Status: Pending

The Marriage Bill, 2023 is a South African bill which would establish a unified marriage policy for all citizens. The bill would supersede three other existing laws regulating the solemnisation of marriage in South Africa by retaining and expanding their protections and regulations.

== Background ==
Three laws currently provide for the status of marriage in South Africa. These are the Marriage Act (Act 25 of 1961), which provides for civil or religious opposite-sex marriages; the Recognition of Customary Marriages Act (Act 120 of 1998), which provides for the civil registration of marriages solemnised according to the traditions of indigenous groups; and the Civil Union Act (Act 17 of 2006), which provides for opposite-sex and same-sex civil marriages, religious marriages and civil partnerships. A person may only be married under one of these laws at any given time. In addition, the Divorce Act (Act 70 of 1979) governs the recognition of divorce.

In October 2020, the Department of Home Affairs confirmed plans to introduce a new draft marriage policy in South Africa, reconciling the diverse marriage laws into a single piece of legislation "that will enable South Africans of different sexual orientation, religious and cultural persuasions to conclude legal marriages", but indicated that the process had been delayed due to the COVID-19 pandemic. In January 2021, the South African Law Reform Commission issued a 300-page discussion paper, offering a number of proposals and alternatives. The commission called for public comments on its discussion paper. The proposed changes include reforms introducing a default property system, as spouses who have not entered into a formal marriage have no statutory rights to share in property which was amassed during the relationship, as well as the legalisation of polyandry.

In addition, on 28 June 2022 in the case Women's Legal Centre Trust v President (2022), the Constitutional Court handed down an order that declared the Marriage Act and the Divorce Act inconsistent with sections 9, 10, 28 and 34 of the Constitution due to their failure to recognize marriages solemnised under sharia. The declaration of constitutional invalidity was suspended for 24 months to allow Parliament to amend both laws. On 27 June 2024, the Court extended the stay of the declaration to 27 June 2026. Parliament filed a brief supporting the stay, asking for time for newly-elected members after the 2024 South African general election to familiarize themselves with the Marriage Bill, as well as seek more input on the bill from Muslim and other minority communities. The stay was affirmed on 18 September 2024.

== Legislative history ==
A draft bill was approved by the Cabinet, and published in the Government Gazette on 7 July 2023. The period for written submission was open until 31 August 2023. The bill was tabled in Parliament in December 2023, and was originally going to be open for public comments until 17 May 2024. As of March 2025, the bill was still in the public hearings phase.
