= Mthembu =

Mthembu family

Mthembu may refer to:

- Gideon Mthembu (born 1963), Swazi sports official and retired runner
- Jackson Mthembu (1957–2021), South African politician
- Precious Mthembu (born 1984), South African netball player
- Ricardo Mthembu (1970–2020), South African politician
- Russel Mthembu (born 1947), South African singer
- Siphelele Mthembu (born 1987), South African footballer
- Thabani Mthembu (born 1994), South African footballer

== See also ==
- Mthembu v Letsela, important case in South African customary law, 1996
