= Matrimonial Property Act, 1984 =

South African statute

Parliament of South Africa
- Long title: Act to amend the matrimonial property law and to provide for matters connected therewith.
- Citation: Act No. 88 of 1984
- Enacted by: Parliament of South Africa
- Assented to: 3 July 1984
- Commenced: 1 November 1984
- Administered by: Minister of Justice

Related legislation
- Marriage Act, 1961; Divorce Act, 1979; Recognition of Customary Marriages Act, 1998; Civil Union Act, 2006
- Status: Amended

The Matrimonial Property Act, 1984 (Act No. 88 of 1984) is an act of the Parliament of South Africa which reformed the law governing the property of married persons. It abolished the marital power of a husband over his wife's estate, established the accrual system for marriages out of community of property, and equalised the property rights of spouses married in community of property.

== Provisions ==
=== Accrual system ===
Chapter I of the act establishes the "accrual system" as the default property regime for marriages contracted after the passing of the act by an antenuptial contract excluding community of property.. This is a system of "deferred sharing of gains" based on the German Zugewinngemeinschaft.

The value of each spouse's estate is recorded at the start of the marriage (either in the antenuptial contract or a separate statement). During the marriage, each spouse keeps their own financially separate estate. At the end of the marriage (either by divorce or death) the "accrual" of each estate is calculated as the difference between its present value and the starting value. The spouse whose estate has a smaller accrual is entitled to claim half of the difference between the accruals.

Some assets are excluded from the calculation of accrual: inheritances, non-patrimonial damages, donations between the spouses, and any asset specifically excluded by the antenuptial contract. The accrual system can also be completely excluded by explicit terms of the antenuptial contract.

=== Abolition of the marital power ===
The marital power gave a husband legal control over his wife, including authority over her ability to form contracts and to litigate, and sole control of their community property. Chapter II of the act abolished the marital power for marriages contracted after the act came into force. The power remained for marriages of Black people governed by the Black Administration Act, 1927, and for marriages contracted before the act.

In 1988 the Marriage and Matrimonial Property Law Amendment Act, 1988 amended Chapter II to abolish the marital power for civil marriages of Black people. In 1993 the General Law Fourth Amendment Act, 1993 amended it again to abolish the marital power for all civil marriages regardless of when they were contracted.
