= Divorce in South Africa =

South African divorce law

Divorce (or the dissolution of marriage) in South African law refers to the termination of a marital union, the canceling of the legal duties and responsibilities of marriage and the dissolving of the bonds of matrimony between a married couple. Divorce is unlike annulment, which declares the marriage null and void. Divorce requires the sanction of a court in a legal process. The legal process of divorce may also involve issues of alimony (spousal support), child custody, child support, distribution of property and division of debt.

Prior to the coming into operation of the Divorce Act in South Africa on 1 July 1979, a decree of divorce could be granted by the court either on one of the two common-law grounds, adultery or malicious desertion, or on one of the two grounds introduced in 1935 by the Divorce Laws Amendment Act: incurable insanity for not less than seven years, or imprisonment of the defendant spouse for at least five years after such spouse has been declared to be a habitual criminal. Except in the case of insanity, these grounds of divorce were based on the guilt (or fault) principle: that is, on the assumption that, in every divorce action, only one of the spouses is to blame for the breakdown of the marriage, the other spouse being completely innocent. The success of the plaintiff's action was thus dependent on proof that the defendant had wilfully committed a matrimonial offence. The guilt principle also determined the patrimonial consequences of divorce in that, failing a maintenance agreement between the spouses, an order for post-divorce maintenance could be made only in favour of the innocent party against the guilty party, and the latter forfeited all patrimonial benefits of the marriage if the former applied for a forfeiture order against him or her.

Severe criticism of the shortcomings of the old divorce law led to an investigation by the South African Law Commission, whose report on the matter ultimately resulted in the enactment of the Divorce Act of 1979. The reform of the law of divorce had as its primary objective the formulation of realistic rules for the dissolution of marriages: rules which make it possible to dissolve failed marriages in a way that results in the least possible disruption for the spouses and their dependants and that best safeguards the interests of minor children. Because it was found that a divorce law based on the guilt principle could not attain this objective, the old grounds of divorce based on this principle were replaced with the ground of irretrievable breakdown of the marriage. This is now the main basis for divorce. Incurable insanity was retained as a ground for divorce, but the minimum period of mental illness was shortened considerably, while the continuous unconsciousness of one of the spouses for a minimum period of six months was added as a new ground. This shift from fault to failure was also reflected (albeit to a lesser extent) in the statutory provisions governing the patrimonial consequences of divorce.

Customary-law marriages, whether entered into before or after the commencement of the Recognition of Customary Marriages Act, can (like common-law marriages) only be dissolved by a court order. This jurisdiction vests in the High Court, a family court established under any law or a Divorce Court established in terms of section 10 of the Administration Amendment Act 1929, but which has exactly the same jurisdiction as any High Court.

== Grounds ==
Under the 1979 Divorce Act, which governs common-law marriages, a decree of divorce may be granted only on one of the following three grounds:

1. irretrievable breakdown of the marriage;
2. incurable mental illness for a continuous period of at least two years; and
3. continuous unconsciousness for a period of at least six months.

The use of the word "may" in sections 3, 4 and 5 of the Divorce Act of 1979 raises the question of whether or not the court has a discretion to refuse a decree of divorce even where all the requirements of one of the abovementioned grounds of divorce have been satisfied: for example, in cases where "divorce would result in grave financial or other hardship for one of the spouses." It has been argued by several writers that it was the intention of the legislature to vest such a residual discretion in the court. When this question was considered (obiter) by the Appellate Division in Schwartz v Schwartz, Corbett JA rejected an interpretation of section 4(1) favouring such a discretion, and this was confirmed and adopted in Levy v Levy. Neither the power of the court to postpone divorce proceedings in order that the parties may attempt a reconciliation, nor the provisions in the Act which attempt to safeguard the interests of minor or dependent children of the marriage, are indicative that a curial discretion was intended. In this regard, Van Zyl J held in Ex Parte Inkley and Inkley that the court has discretion not to refuse a divorce once the grounds for such dissolution have been proved unequivocally, but to postpone the dissolution of the marriage until certain conditions have been met, depending on the circumstances of the case.

In terms of section 8(1) of the Recognition of Customary Marriages Act, a customary marriage, entered into before or after the commencement of the Act, "may only be dissolved by a court by a decree of divorce on the ground of the irretrievable breakdown of the marriage." The court will grant a decree of divorce "if it is satisfied that the marriage relationship between the parties to the marriage has reached such a state of disintegration that there is no reasonable prospect of the restoration of a normal marriage relationship." This ground of divorce is the same as that of irretrievable breakdown of the marriage in terms of section 4 of the Divorce Act. Whether or not the courts will interpret the provisions of the Recognition of Customary Marriages Act on the irretrievable breakdown ground of divorce in the same way as they have interpreted this ground under the Divorce Act remains to be seen.

The Act does not make any reference to the repayment of lobola in relation to the dissolution of the marriage. It is therefore assumed that its repayment to the husband or his family is not necessary for the dissolution of the marriage. This also follows from the view that, though required for marriage, the agreement for the payment of lobola is separate from the contract of marriage itself.

Section 8(3) of the Recognition of Customary Marriages Act makes statutory mediation provisions applicable to customary marriages as well, but mediation may also be conducted in accordance with customary law.

=== Irretrievable breakdown of marriage ===
The following principles apply only to the dissolution of a common-law marriage in terms of the Divorce Act. To obtain a decree of divorce on the ground of the irretrievable breakdown of the marriage, the plaintiff must satisfy the court that the marriage relationship between the parties has reached such a state of disintegration that there is no reasonable prospect of the restoration of a normal marriage relationship between them. As was pointed out by Margo J in Naidoo v Naidoo, this test is both subjective and objective:

- It is subjective in that different people may react in different ways to the same situation. The plaintiff may be irrevocably convinced that the marriage is dead, and adamant in his or her determination not to continue with it, while the defendant may "wish at all costs to preserve it." Although this is a strong indication of irretrievable marriage breakdown, unilateral demand is not as such a ground of divorce in South African law.
- The test for irretrievable breakdown is therefore also objective in that it is the court (and not the parties) which must be satisfied that the marriage has in fact broken down irretrievably. The court must hear evidence of facts or circumstances showing that irretrievable breakdown has occurred. Because South African law does not in theory allow divorce by consent of the spouses, the mere fact that both spouses wish the marriage to be terminated would not suffice if unsupported by other evidence.

In Schwartz v Schwartz, the Appellate Division formulated the general approach to be taken as follows:

In determining whether a marriage has reached such a state of disintegration that there is no reasonable prospect of the restoration of a normal marriage relationship between the parties it is important to have regard to what has happened in the past, ie the history of the relationship up to the date of trial, and also to the present attitude of the parties to the marriage relationship as revealed by the evidence at the trial.

In Coetzee v Coetzee, the court found that this test had not been met. It held that the claim that the marriage has broken down irretrievably cannot succeed if no evidence is adduced of any change in the pattern of the parties' marriage which shows a difference in that pattern between the time of the institution of the action and a time in the past from which a breakdown in their marriage relationship can be inferred. A marriage which has always been a dreary or unattractive one does not break down as "a result of a mere reservatio mentalis or change of animus without an accompanying factum. There must be a discernible change in the pattern which points to a 'putting an end to such cohabitation as there was.'"

The cause of the breakdown of the marriage is immaterial. Although the Act, in section 4(2), enumerates three sets of circumstances which may be accepted by the court as proof of irretrievable breakdown, it is quite clear from the wording of this provision that the court may accept evidence of any other facts or circumstances as equally indicative of the demise of the marriage. Furthermore, despite initial misgivings that the three guidelines set out in section 4(2) could in practice be treated as the only criteria for determining whether irretrievable breakdown of a marriage had in fact taken place, it is apparent from the case law since the commencement of the Divorce Act that very little reliance has thus far been placed on these guidelines.

section 4(2) of the Act sets out the circumstances which the court may accept as proof of irretrievable breakdown:

- that the parties have not lived together as husband and wife for a continuous period of at least one year immediately prior to the date of institution of the divorce action;
- that the defendant has committed adultery and that the plaintiff finds it irreconcilable with a continued marriage relationship; or
- that the defendant has in terms of a sentence of a court been declared a habitual criminal and is undergoing imprisonment as a result of such sentence.

It is important to bear in mind that proof of one of these three factual situations is not necessarily conclusive evidence of marriage breakdown, although such proof "presumably establishes a prima facie case, if not a factual presumption, that the marriage is at an end."

==== Non-cohabitation for one year ====
It is clear that more is required for the purposes of this guideline than mere geographical separation between the spouses; there must have been a termination of the marital consortium. Like the common-law ground of malicious desertion, non-cohabitation "as husband and wife" (or rather, as a married couple) within the meaning of section 4(2)(a) presumably includes a physical as well as a mental element: that is, the fact of separation and the intention of at least one of the spouses to terminate the marriage relationship. The reason for the cessation of cohabitation is, however, irrelevant, as is the question of which spouse is to blame in this regard.

In the usual case spouses cease to "live together as husband and wife" or as a married couple when they establish separate households, at least one of them having the intention to put an end to their marriage relationship by such a move. However, the marital consortium may cease to exist even though the spouses continue to live together under one roof. There may be a complete breakdown in real communication between them, and they may no longer have a sexual relationship with each other, for example, even though they continue to reside in the same home. On the other hand, the mere fact that the spouses are physically separated from each other for a period of time does not necessarily mean that they are not living together as married couple. As long as both spouses continue to recognise their marriage "in word and deed", the marital consortium between them continues to exist.

Section 4(2)(a) requires an unbroken period of non-cohabitation of at least one year immediately preceding the date of the institution of the divorce action. Whether the running of this one-year period will be interrupted by short intervals of resumed cohabitation, in attempts by the spouses at reconciliation, is a matter for debate in South African law.

==== Adultery by the defendant which the plaintiff finds irreconcilable with a continued marriage relationship ====
It would appear that the word "adultery" bears its ordinary common-law meaning of voluntary sexual intercourse between a married person and a person other than his or her spouse. It includes other forms of sexual intercourse, such as sodomy and bestiality, and (apparently) rape by the husband of another woman. A married woman who is raped, however, or who undergoes artificial insemination by a donor without her husband's consent, does not commit adultery.

There must be a causal connection between the defendant's adultery and the fact that the plaintiff finds it impossible to continue with the marriage. Usually, the mere fact that the plaintiff institutes divorce proceedings would appear to be sufficient evidence of this causal link, but there may be some doubt in this regard if the plaintiff has connived at or condoned the defendant's adultery.

==== Imprisonment of the defendant after declaration as a habitual criminal ====
This guideline is clearly based on section 1(1)(b) of the repealed Divorce Laws Amendment Act, in terms of which the habitual criminality of the defendant, and resulting imprisonment, was laid down as a ground of divorce. A minimum period of imprisonment is no longer required, however, although it would appear that the defendant must actually be in prison at the date on which the divorce action is instituted.

In terms of s 4(3), the court may postpone divorce proceedings based on the ground of irretrievable breakdown if it appears to the court that there is a reasonable possibility that the parties may become reconciled through marriage counselling, treatment or reflection. Where an undefended divorce action is postponed in order that the parties may attempt reconciliation, the postponing court may order a new trial before a different judge.

=== Incurable mental illness ===
In order to obtain a divorce on the ground of the mental illness of the defendant, the plaintiff must satisfy the court that the defendant

- has been admitted as a patient to an institution in terms of a reception order issued under the Mental Health Act, or is being detained as a State patient at an institution or other place specified by the Minister of Correctional Services, or is being detained as a mentally ill convicted prisoner at an institution; and
- that he or she has not been unconditionally discharged from the respective institution or place of detention for a continuous period of at least two years immediately prior to the institution of the divorce action;
- that, on the evidence of at least two psychiatrists, one of whom must be appointed by the court, the defendant is mentally ill and there is no reasonable prospect of a cure.

The expressions "institution", "mental illness", "State patient" and "reception order" have the meanings assigned to them in the Mental Health Act of 1983.

=== Continuous unconsciousness ===
In terms of section 5(2), the court will grant a decree of divorce on this ground if it is satisfied

- that the defendant has been unconscious by reason of a physical disorder for a continuous period of at least six months immediately prior to the institution of the divorce action; and
- that, on the evidence of at least two medical practitioners, one of whom must be a neurologist or a neurosurgeon appointed by the court, there is no reasonable prospect that the defendant will regain consciousness.

There are certain special provisions in respect of divorce on the grounds of mental illness and continuous unconsciousness, the purpose of which is to protect the interests of the defendant in such cases. The court may appoint a legal practitioner to represent the defendant and order the plaintiff to pay the costs of such representation. It may also order the furnishing of security by the plaintiff in respect of any patrimonial benefits to which the defendant may be entitled by reason of the dissolution of the marriage. Finally, in the case of a decree of divorce being granted on one of these two grounds, no order for the forfeiture of any patrimonial benefits of the marriage may be made against the defendant.

== Relationship between ss 4 and 5 ==
The relationship between sections 4 and 5 of the Divorce Act has been the subject of much debate. Two questions have arisen in this regard:

1. whether a court may grant a divorce in terms of section 4 (on the ground of irretrievable breakdown) where the defendant is mentally ill or unconscious, but where the requirements of section 5 have not been satisfied; and
2. whether there are grounds for divorce where the defendant suffers from a physical or mental illness or disability not covered by section 5, but which has nevertheless caused the marriage to break down irretrievably.

As regards the first question, it is clear from the case law that the answer is in the affirmative. Provided that the plaintiff proves to the satisfaction of the court that the marriage has irretrievably broken down, the fact that the cause of the breakdown was the mental illness or continuous unconsciousness of the defendant does not prevent the plaintiff from basing his or her action on section 4 rather than section 5. As has been pointed out by Van der Vyver and Joubert, because the special rules for the protection of the mentally ill or unconscious defendant would not operate in such a situation, the court must protect the interests of the defendant in such cases, and must, if necessary, insist on the appointment of a curator ad litem for him or her.

In the case of Smit v Smit, a full Bench answered the second question posed above in the affirmative, rejecting the view that the legislature intended to differentiate between cases of "faultless prevention of the continuation of the marriage" in section 4, on the one hand, and cases of "supervening impossibility" in section 5, on the other. A marriage may be dissolved on the ground of irretrievable breakdown even if the breakdown was caused by circumstances quite beyond the control of either spouse.

== Consequences ==
=== Personal ===
The personal consequences of divorce under customary law are in many respects similar to those under the common law. The principles stated below, therefore, apply to both customary marriages and to common-law marriages, unless otherwise indicated. There is no distinction in this regard between customary marriages entered into before the Recognition of Customary Marriages Act, and those entered into after the Act.

A decree of divorce terminates, with prospective effect, all the personal consequences of the marriage, with the exception of the evidentiary privilege in respect of communications exchanged between the former spouses stante matrimonio. As in the case of the dissolution of marriage by death, the wife may either continue to use her husband's surname or, without requiring the consent of the Director-General of Home Affairs, resume a surname which she bore at any previous time.

Both of the parties are free to marry other persons. If, however, parties to a common-law marriage decide to remarry each other, a new marriage ceremony must be performed. The old common-law prohibition on marriage between an adulterous divorced spouse and his or her lover is obsolete.

Chuma Himonga submits that the non-repayment upon divorce of the relevant lobola paid in respect of a customary marriage will not affect the capacity of the divorced wife to remarry. This follows, he argues, from the view that the lobola contract is separate from the marriage contract.

=== Patrimonial ===
The common-law principles regulating the patrimonial consequences of divorce discussed below apply also, mutatis mutandis, to all customary marriages. There are, however, three exceptions.

== See also ==
- Marriage in South Africa
- Polygamy in South Africa
- Same-sex marriage in South Africa
- Civil partnership in South Africa
- Religion in South Africa
- South African family law
- Texts on Wikisource:
  - Marriage Act, 1961
  - Recognition of Customary Marriages Act, 1998
  - Civil Union Act, 2006
