= Mthembu v Letsela =

South African legal case

Mthembu v Letsela and Another, an important case in South African customary law, was heard in the Transvaal Provincial Division by Le Roux J on 21 November 1996, with judgment handed down on 25 November.

The rule of African customary law which generally excludes African women from intestate succession was recognised by section 23 of the Black Administration Act and the regulations framed thereunder, especially regulation 2, promulgated on 6 February 1987, in Government Gazette 10601, as Government Notice R200, making black law and custom applicable to the devolution of the estate of a deceased black person. It was common cause in the present case that this system applied the principle of a male primogeniture: The estate sought a male heir, whether a descendant or a parent or a grandparent.

The question that had to be considered was whether this rule of succession unfairly discriminated between persons on grounds of sex or gender, and was in conflict with the provisions of section 8 of the Interim Constitution. It was common cause that, in rural areas where this customary rule most frequently found its application, the devolution of the deceased's property unto the male heir involved a concomitant duty of support and protection of the woman or women to whom he was married by customary law, and of the children procreated under that system and belonging to a particular house. A widow in particular might remain at the deceased's homestead and continue to use the estate property, and the heir could not eject her at his whim.

If it was accepted that the duty to provide sustenance, maintenance and shelter is a necessary corollary of the system of primogeniture, the court found, it was difficult to equate this form of differentiation between men and women with the concept of "unfair discrimination" as used in section 8 of the Constitution. In view of the manifest acknowledgement of customary law as a system existing parallel to the common law by the Constitution, and the freedom granted to persons to choose this system as governing their relationships, it could not be accepted that the succession rule was necessarily in conflict with section 8. Nor was it contrary to public policy or natural justice as envisaged in the Law of Evidence Amendment Act.

There are, the court noted, other instances where a rule differentiates between men and women, but which no right-minded person considers to be unfairly discriminatory: for example, the provision of separate toilet facilities. It followed that, even if this rule of succession were prima facie discriminatory on the grounds of sex or gender, and the presumption contained in section 8(4) of the Interim Constitution were to come into operation, this presumption had been refuted by the concomitant duty of support. The rights conferred by this customary rule were not inconsistent with the fundamental rights contained in chapter 3 of the Interim Constitution and the injunction found in section 33(3) could accordingly be implemented: namely, to construe the chapter in such a way as not to negate those rights.

The judgment in Mthembu v Letsela was overturned by the Constitutional Court in Bhe v Magistrate, Khayelitsha in which the customary principle of primogeniture was found to be unconstitutional.

== See also ==
- Customary law
- Customary law in South Africa
