= Civil Union Amendment Act, 2020 =

Act of the South African Parliament

Civil Union Amendment Act, 2020 List: 3 other official names: uMthethosivivinywa wokuShadiswa kwaBantu bobuLili obuFanayo (Zulu); uMthetho oYilwayo woMtshato waBantu beSini esiFanayo (Xhosa); Wetsontwerp op Burgerlike Verbintenisse (Afrikaans); uMtsetfosivivinyo weKuchibeka Temshado weBantfu beBulili Lobufananako (Swazi)

Parliament of South Africa
- Long title: Act to amend the Civil Union Act, 2006, by repealing a section; and to provide for matters connected therewith.
- Citation: Act No. 8 of 2020
- Territorial extent: South Africa
- Passed by: National Assembly
- Passed: 6 December 2018
- Passed by: National Council of Provinces
- Passed: 1 July 2020
- Assented to: 20 October 2020
- Commenced: 22 October 2020

Legislative history

First chamber: National Assembly
- Bill title: Civil Union Amendment Bill
- Bill citation: B11—2018
- Introduced by: Deidre Carter
- Introduced: 14 May 2018

Amends
- Civil Union Act, 2006
- Status: In force

The Civil Union Amendment Act, 2020 is an act of the Parliament of South Africa which repealed section 6 of the Civil Union Act, 2006, a section which had allowed civil marriage officers to opt out of solemnising same-sex marriages on the grounds of conscience, religion or belief.

The Civil Union Act was enacted in 2006 to legalise same-sex marriage in South Africa. Section 6 of the act provided that:

A marriage officer, other than a marriage officer referred to in section 5, may in writing inform the Minister [of Home Affairs] that he or she objects on the ground of conscience, religion and belief to solemnising a civil union between persons of the same sex, whereupon that marriage officer shall not be compelled to solemnise such civil union.

This provision did not apply to religious marriage officers (those "referred to in section 5") because they were in any case not obliged to solemnise a marriage that would violate the doctrines of their religion. It applied only to those who were marriage officers by view of their position in the government—mainly magistrates and officials of the Department of Home Affairs.

Several constitutional scholars argued that this provision was unconstitutional, calling it "state-sanctioned discrimination" in violation of the right to equality. In July 2017, more than a decade after same-sex marriage was legalised in South Africa, LGBT newspaper Mambaonline reported that 421 (out of 1,130) marriage officers in South Africa were exempt from performing same-sex marriages or civil partnerships, mostly in the Eastern Cape, the Free State and Mpumalanga. Minister of Home Affairs Malusi Gigaba announced that the Department of Home Affairs had undertaken several measures to resolve the issue, including increasing sensitisation of Home Affairs officials and ensuring that same-sex couples are treated respectfully and according to policies and laws by staff.

In May 2017, MP Deidre Carter asked Minister of Home Affairs Hlengiwe Mkhize whether she would be willing to introduce legislation to repeal the objection provisions from the Civil Union Act. Mkhize opposed, saying that "the Civil Union Act is clear in that marriage officers will not be compelled to solemnise such civil unions". She reiterated Gigaba's statement about sensitising marriage officers.

In January 2018, Carter introduced the Civil Union Amendment Bill to repeal the objection provisions. She quoted Chapter 10 of the South African Constitution, which states that "services must be provided impartially, fairly, equitably and without bias", when lodging the bill with the Office of the Speaker of the National Assembly. Carter presented her bill to the Portfolio Committee on Home Affairs on 15 August. Later that day, all four major political parties (the African National Congress, the Democratic Alliance, the Economic Freedom Fighters, and the Inkatha Freedom Party) announced their support for the bill. Supporters of the bill have pointed to a number of same-sex couples who were turned away when applying to marry, including a high-profile case of a couple in oThongathi, KwaZulu-Natal who were called derogoratory names when turned away.

In November 2018, the Portfolio Committee on Home Affairs unanimously accepted the bill with some amendments. One of these amendments allows officials who previously did not marry same-sex couples to continue doing so for two years. This would give the Ministry of Home Affairs time to implement the new policy. New officials, however, cannot opt out at all for any time. If a branch has an official opting out for the two-year period, they must have another official available who can perform the marriage. The bill passed the National Assembly on 6 December 2018, with support from all parties expect for the African Christian Democratic Party, the National Freedom Party and the African Independent Congress. The National Council of Provinces approved the legislation on 1 July 2020 by a 33–5 vote. It was signed into law by President Cyril Ramaphosa on 22 October 2020.
