= Lydia Komape-Ngwenya =

South African politician, activist and trade unionist

Lydia Komape-Ngwenya OLB

Member of the Limpopo Provincial Legislature
- In office 6 May 2009 – 7 May 2019

Member of the National Assembly
- In office 9 May 1994 – May 2009
- Constituency: Limpopo

Personal details
- Born: Makwena Lydia Ngwenya; 6 August 1935 Matlala, Transvaal; Union of South Africa
- Died: 11 October 2023 (aged 88)
- Party: African National Congress

Makwena Lydia Komape-Ngwenya (née Ngwenya; 6 August 1935 – 11 October 2023), also known as Lydia Kompe, was a South African politician, activist, and trade unionist. She represented the African National Congress in the National Assembly from 1994 to 2009 and in the Limpopo Provincial Legislature from 2009 to 2019.

The child of tenant farmers in the Northern Transvaal, Komape-Ngwenya rose to political prominence in the mid-1970s as one of the few senior women in the Metal and Allied Workers' Union. In 1986, she returned to the rural Transvaal, where she worked for the Black Sash and founded the Rural Women's Movement to attract greater attention to women's issues in the negotiations to end apartheid. She joined the South African Parliament after the end of apartheid.

== Early life and education ==
Komape-Ngwenya was born on 6 August 1935 in rural Matlala, a village near Pietersburg in the former Transvaal. One of seven children, Komape-Ngwenya later described herself as the "daughter of a peasant"; she grew up on the farm of the local Lutheran Mission, where her father was deacon and raised livestock and sweet potatoes. Her family and other tenants lost their land rights in 1950 under an apartheid betterment planning scheme.

Though Komape-Ngwenya's mother moved to Johannesburg to find domestic work, her father was unemployed and the family was increasingly impoverished. In 1954, having completed Standard Eight (grade ten), Komape-Ngwenya left school to find work in a small town. She later moved to Johannesburg, where, after stint as a domestic worker in Hyde Park and as a nurse-aide in a hospital, she found factory work.

== Labour and rural activism ==
While working at the Heinemann Electric factory outside Alexandra, Komape-Ngwenya was recruited by the Metal and Allied Workers' Union (MAWU) in 1974. She was elected as a shop steward in 1976 and later the same year, helped organise a strike in solidarity with protestors in the Soweto uprising. After the strike, Komape-Ngwenya and other shop stewards were fired, and in 1977 she was hired by MAWU as a full-time union organiser.

At the time, Komape-Ngwenya was the union's only woman organiser, and she later reflected on her attempts to resist the sexism she faced. For example, to challenge the presumption that she would be responsible for domestic chores in the office, she drew up a chore roster for the men. In addition, Komape-Ngwenya argued that male unionists were rarely concerned with the problems faced by women workers; she said that parental leave was a rare issue on which women received men's support, because the men hoped to be granted paternity leave and "have a holiday and a rest from work". As an organiser, Komape-Ngwenya advocated for certain women's issues, such as the unionisation of women night-cleaners and their resistance to the sexual exploitation of their supervisors.

As part of her union work, in 1978, Komape-Ngwenya was asked to establish the Transvaal branch of the Transport and General Workers' Union (TGWU, until then based in Natal); she remained active in TGWU until 1985. During this period, she was involved in founding the Federation of South African Trade Unions in 1979 – and particularly in establishing the federation's women's committee – and later the Congress of South African Trade Unions in 1985.

The following year, Komape-Ngwenya returned to the rural Transvaal and worked as a full-time fieldworker for the Black Sash's Transvaal Rural Action Committee, which at the time was focused on supporting those affected by forced removals. Drawing on her experience with the committee, Komape-Ngwenya co-founded the Rural Women's Movement in 1986. The movement functioned as an umbrella lobby group and was a prominent grassroots voice in the negotiations to end apartheid; among other things, the movement opposed proposals to exempt traditional leadership from gender equality prescripts.

== Post-apartheid political career ==
=== National Assembly ===
In the 1994 general election, Komape-Ngwenya was elected to represent the African National Congress (ANC) in the National Assembly. She was re-elected to further terms in 1999 and 2004, representing the Limpopo constituency. She later compared moving to Cape Town to go to Parliament with her earlier experience leaving her children to work in Johannesburg, saying, "It was a continuation of my life as a migrant worker. Only now I was doing this for the sake of the people who put me there. It is unlike before when I was forced by circumstances to leave my children."

During her first term in the assembly, Komape-Ngwenya was a member of the Portfolio Committee on Agriculture and Land Affairs, in which capacity she was involved in processing the Restitution of Land Rights Bill, a major piece of land reform legislation. She later said that, during discussions on the Bill, "I could talk from experience about the importance of women being included in that legislation." She was also a member of the Joint Monitoring Committee on the Improvement of the Quality of Life and Status of Women and supported the passage of the Maintenance Bill to grant legal recognition to customary marriages.

=== Limpopo Legislature ===
After the 2009 general election, Komape-Ngwenya left the National Assembly to take up an ANC seat in the Limpopo Provincial Legislature. She served two terms there, gaining re-election in 2014, and retired after the 2019 general election.

== Personal life ==
Komape-Ngwenya had three adult children, all of whom trained to be teachers. Her first child was born in 1956 and she married in 1958. She later described her marriage as unhappy, partly because of the pressure created by pass laws and poverty. In 1973, Komape-Ngwenya left her husband, taking her children. It was at this point that Komape-Ngwenya became known as "Lydia Kompe": having been married as Lydia Komape, she acquired a forged ID document, under the name Lydia Kompe, that identified her as Coloured rather than black and that therefore allowed her to escape some pass laws.

== Death ==
Komape-Ngwenya died on 11 October 2023. She was buried in Tsimanye, a village near Groblersdal in Limpopo, and received a special official funeral which was addressed by Limpopo Premier Stan Mathabatha and ANC Deputy Secretary-General Maropene Ramokgopa.

== Honours ==
In March 2009, President Kgalema Motlanthe awarded Komape-Ngwenya the Order of Luthuli in Bronze for her "commitment to workers' rights, the empowerment of rural women and the liberation of our people."
