= Civil Union Act =

Civil Union Act may refer to:

- Civil Union Act 2004 (New Zealand)
- Civil Union Act, 2006 (South Africa)

== See also ==
- Civil union
