= Thandeka Mazibuko =

- Born: kwaNyuswa in KwaZulu-Natal
- Education: 1996 - Bachelors of Science, University of North South Africa. 2005 - Masters in Medicine and Surgery - Nelson Mandela School of Medicine
- Occupation: Medical doctor in the field of radiation oncology

Thandeka Mazibuko is a South African trained medical doctor, mentor, and oncology and clinical researcher. She is the first indigenous black female to work in the field of radiation oncology in KwaZulu-Natal. Additionally, she is a human rights advocate for women's health and ending forced marriage.

She is the founder of Black Women in Oncology, Inc. and SinomusaNothando Community Development, Inc. She is a rural philanthropist, public speaker, television producer and host.

== Early life ==
Mazibuko grew up in kwaNyuswa, a rural village in KwaZulu-Natal. She married at age 17, which later ended in divorce.

She is quoted as saying she grew up having stories told to her around a fire from her grandmother. She says that the experience of listening to her grandmother prepared her for the importance of listening to patients when she became a medical doctor. She is quoted as saying "Every patient has a story to tell about her breast cancer, and I have to listen to the story that brought her to me. At times the story is not told in the manner, language or order that we expect but, together with proper examination and medical investigations, good listening skills, patience and compassion, we end up with the full story – leading to appropriate treatment and care".

Mazibuko's mother was a single parent and a domestic worker. Mazibuko says as growing up "my village kwaNyuswa had not seen a medical doctor; therefore, I had no role models. I was that girl who came home and cooked for the whole family, who fetched water from the river and wood from the forest. We had no shoes at times, as my mother was struggling as a single parent". Mazibuko became the first in her family to achieve literacy and forged on to become the first indigenous Black person to enter the field of radiation oncology in her province of South Africa.

== Education ==
1996 - Bachelors of Science, University of North South Africa, which later became a part of University of Limpopo.

2005 - Masters in Medicine and Surgery - Nelson Mandela School of Medicine

Mazibuko has studied at Albert Einstein College of Medicine and Yeshiva University in New York City.

Mazibuko is fluent in English, Zulu, Xhosa and Sotho.

== Career ==
=== Medicine ===
Mazibuko raised money to pay for medical school by door to door funding, and loans. Mazibuko was a student doctor at Prince Mshiyehi Memorial Hospital in Durban, South Africa. While a street she worked with orphans, and started two clinics for disadvantaged people in KwaNyuswa.

In 2004, Mazibuko started NGO SinomusaNothando, which means "We Have Love and Generosity". The mission is to help individuals and communities have improved quality of life and achieve their potential. In particular, the mission includes decentralizing oncology resources to encompass villages and to train more oncologists to serve the rural communtites. SinomusaNothando is a registered nonprofit in South Africa. In 2018, the organization purchased land at KwaNyuswa to build a modern hospital to provide medical care to local patients. The oncology unit will provide the rural population with accessible medical care.

In 2009, Mazibuko moved into the field of radiation oncology. Working as a medical officer and a resident in radiation oncology.

2009 - 2013, Grey's Hospital, Radiation Oncology Department, Senior Medical Officer, Pietermarizburg, South Africa.

In 2018, Mazibuko started a non-profit that advocates for ending forced marriages to help young girls. The non-profit organization is called End Forced Marriage Inc.

In 2018, Mazibuko received Excellence in Health Care Award for Charity Work in New York. Given by Smart Health Company

In 2019, she presented on a panel at the World Cancer Day event in New York City.

Mazibuko attended the Albert Luthuli Hospital for her residency in medicine.

She advocates for cancer awareness and early detection, and rural health.

Mazibuko has worked for New York City's Montefiore Medical Center Radiation Oncology from 2018. She has served on rotation under Gary Schwartz at Sloan Kettering Cancer Hospital, treated patients at Presbyterian Hospital in Harlem, and at Sinai Radiobiology and Radiation Oncology Departments both in New York City. She heads a study on radiotherapy in Africa.

=== Ending forced marriage ===
Mazibuko advocates for the empowerment of women by telling her story. She does outreach education online via Spotify, Clubhouse, Facebook, and Twitter. She has advocated for 20 years for changing South Africa's marriage act.

== Awards & honors ==
- 2012 - Social Entrepreneur of the year; Durban Regional Business Achiever Awards
- 2010 - Oprah Magazine "Heroine" of Oprah Magazine
- 2013 - "Heroine of Change" issue of True Love Magazine
- 2014 - Standard Bank Rising Star
- 2015 - South African of the Year

== Public speaking ==
Radiation Oncology Medical Officer Multiple Clinic Presentations Brachytherapy Research Presentations Radiation Oncology Residency Program Scheduled Presentations Presentations at the Tumor Board Meetings National and International

WHCR Radio Host, New York City. Monday's Cancer Awareness Breakfast Show (August 2016 to October 2016).

=== Philanthropic public speaking ===
Mazibuko has been a guest speaker at SNMA conference at Albert Einstein College of Medicine in New York City. She has also been guest speaker at Medical Conference Rutgers University in New Jersey
