= RWM (disambiguation) =

RWM may refer to:

- RWM, a time signal radio station in Russia
- Rural Women's Movement, the South African women's organization
- Ràdio Web MACBA, an online radio with a podcast subscription service
- rwm, the ISO 639-3 code for Amba language (Bantu)
- Resistive Wall Modes, part of the MHD Instabilities
- Read–write memory, a type of computer memory
- Resorts World Manila, an integrated resort, located in Newport City
- Radioactive Waste Management
