= NMRW =

NMRW can refer to:

- National Monuments Record of Wales, Welsh archive established by Royal Commission
- National Movement of Rural Women, South African women's organization
