= South African identity card =

National identity card of South Africa

South African Identity Card
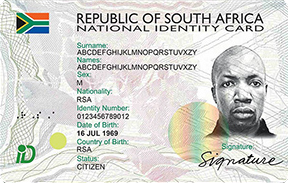
- South African Smart Card (front)

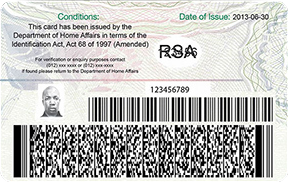
- Reverse
- Type: Identity card
- Issued by: South Africa; Department of Home Affairs
- Purpose: Proof of identity
- Valid in: South Africa
- Eligibility: South African citizenship and Permanent residents

The South African smart identity card – known as a Smart ID Card – replaces the old green bar-coded identity book. Both are identity documents that serve as proof of a person's identity. This proof includes a person's photograph, their full name, their date of birth, their place of birth, and their unique identity number.

The identity card securely stores the biometrics (face and fingerprint) information of the individual. The card also has space to securely store additional info, such as evidence of votes cast in local and national elections, as a means to prevent voter fraud.

Identity documents are issued to South African citizens or permanent residence permit holders who are 16 years or older. People, including spouses and children, who are working for the South African government or one of its statutory bodies outside of South Africa also qualify to receive a South African identity document.

The smart ID card was introduced in 2013. All South African citizens in South Africa can apply for the smart ID card. For identity document-purposes, the old green ID book will be phased out.

Identity documents are issued by South Africa's National Department of Home Affairs.

ID cards are printed in English, which serves as the lingua franca in South Africa.

== History ==
In 2025, the Department of Home Affairs issued 4 million Smart IDs - a 17% increase from the 3.42 million issued in 2024.

In March 2026, it was reported that SA Smart IDs (along with birth certificates and passports) could, for the first time, recognize and record Khoisan traditional names. Home Affairs Minister Leon Schreiber handed over the first Smart ID produced by the department and the Government Printing Works that reflected a Khoisan traditional name, following recent upgrades to the department’s IT systems which allowed for new characters to be printed.

In mid-2026, the Department of Home Affairs announced Digital ID, which has Biometric Data (fingerprints, face, etc.), along with other official documents, cryptographically secured in the MyMzansi phone app. It used alongside the physical Smart IDs that are needed to get a digital ID. Also, Digital ID will be also used for banking. Leon Schreiber demonstrated a working digital ID prototype on the 4th of October 2026.

== Physical appearance ==
There are two types of Smart ID Card; card Type A for regular length names and card Type B for longer length names. Both contain the following information:

=== Front side ===
- Surname
- Names
- Sex
- Nationality
- Identity Number
- Date of birth
- Country of birth
- South African citizenship status (citizen or permanent resident)
- Primary image on front of card
- Signature
- RSA flag

=== Reverse side ===
- Card number
- Secondary image
- Code 39 barcode
- PDF417 barcode

=== Identity Number ===
Each South African ID number is a 13-digit number defined as YYMMDD SSSS CAZ, which deciphers as follows:

| Field | Description |
|---|---|
| YYMMDD | Date of birth |
| SSSS | Sequential number: 0000–4999 for females and 5000–9999 for males. |
| C | Status: 0 = South African citizen, 1 = non-SA-born permanent resident, 2 = refugee. |
| A | 8 or 9: Was used as a racial identifier but is now random. |
| Z | Check digit used to validate the ID Number, which is calculated using the Luhn algorithm. |

=== Barcode Data ===
The back of the card contains two barcodes:

==== Code 39 ====
The one-dimensional Code 39 barcode contains:

- Identity number

==== PDF417 ====
The two-dimensional PDF417 barcode contains:

- Surname
- Names
- Sex
- Nationality
- Identity Number
- Day of Birth
- Country of Birth
- Status
- Date of Issue
- A 5-digit security number, appearing with the text 'RSA' in the multiple-layer image on the back of the card
- A 9-digit card number appearing on the back of the card
- The sequence 1234567890 repeated to fill up the available space in the PDF417 barcode.

== See also ==
- National identity cards
