= Bhe v Magistrate, Khayelitsha =

South African legal case

Bhe and Others v Magistrate, Khayelitsha and Others; Shibi v Sithole and Others; SA Human Rights Commission and Another v President of the RSA and Another was an important case in South African customary law.

The case was heard in the Constitutional Court on 2 and 3 March 2004, with judgment handed down on 15 October. Chaskalson CJ, Langa DCJ, Madala J, Mokgoro J, Moseneke J, Ngcobo J, O'Regan J, Sachs J, Skweyiya J, Van Der Westhuizen J, and Yacoob J were the presiding judges.

The court held that section 23 of the Black Administration Act, in applying the system of male primogeniture, was incompatible with sections 9 (equality) and 10 (dignity) of the South African Constitution.

== Facts ==
The two main issues at hand were the question of the constitutional validity of section 23 of the Black Administration Act, and the constitutional validity of the principle of primogeniture in the context of the customary law of succession.

In the matter of Bhe and Others v Magistrate, Khayelitsha, and Others two minor children, both extra-marital daughters, had failed to qualify as heirs in the intestate estate of their deceased father. The father of the deceased was appointed representative and sole heir of the deceased's estate. Under the system of intestate succession, minor children did not qualify to be heirs in the intestate estate of their deceased father. According to these provisions, the estate was to be distributed according to "Black law and custom."

The applicants challenged, in the South African High Court, the appointment of the deceased's father as heir and representative of the estate. After considering the opposed application, the High Court concluded that the legislative provisions that had been challenged, and on which the father of the deceased had relied, were inconsistent with the Constitution and therefore invalid. The court further declared that, until the defects were corrected by the legislature, the distribution of intestate black estates was to be governed by the Intestate Succession Act.

In the Shibi matter, the applicant's brother had died intestate. The deceased had not married, nor had he been a partner in a customary union. He had no children and was not survived by a parent or grandparent. His nearest male relatives were his two cousins. Since the deceased was an African, his estate fell to be administered under the provisions of section 23(10) of the Black Administration Act, resulting in first the one cousin being appointed as representative, and then, after protestations, the other cousin being appointed as sole heir of the estate.

The estate of the deceased fell to be distributed according to custom. Ms Shibi, in terms of that system, was precluded from being the heir to the intestate estate of her deceased brother. In the High Court, she challenged the magistrate's decision and the manner in which the estate had been administered. She sought and obtained an order declaring herself to be the sole heir in the estate of her deceased brother.

== Judgment ==
=== Direct access ===
The Constitutional Court held that it could grant direct access in exceptional circumstances only. In the present matter, the court considered the following: The challenged provisions governed the administration and distribution of all intestate estates of deceased Africans. The impact of the provisions fell mainly on African women and children, arguably the most vulnerable groups in South African society. The provisions also affected male persons who, in terms of the customary-law rule of primogeniture, were not heirs to the intestate estates of deceased Africans. Many people were therefore affected by these provisions; it was desirable that clarity as to their constitutional validity be established as soon as possible. The submissions sought to be made by the applicants related to substantive issues that were already before the Court. The application further added fresh insights on difficult issues, including the question of the appropriate remedy. Both applicants were found to be eminently qualified to be part of the debate on the issues before the Court. The court held, accordingly, that it was in the interests of justice that the application for direct access be granted.

=== Legislative framework in relation to the Constitution ===
The court held, accordingly, that section 23 of the Act and its regulations were, construed in the light of their history and context, manifestly discriminatory and thus in breach of section 9(3) of the Constitution. The only remaining question was whether this discrimination was capable of justification in terms of section 36 of the Constitution.

=== Justification inquiry ===
The court found that the rights violated were important ones, particularly in the South African context. The rights to equality and dignity were among the most valuable in any open and democratic State, and assumed special importance in South Africa, due to its history of inequality and hurtful discrimination on grounds such as race and gender. Although it was possible to argue that, despite its racist and sexist nature, section 23 gave recognition to customary law and acknowledged the pluralist nature of South African society, this was not its dominant purpose or effect.

Section 23 was enacted as part of a racist programme intent on entrenching division and subordination, and its effect had been to ossify customary law; in the light of this, it could not be justified in the open and democratic society intended in section 36 of the Constitution. It was clear, therefore, that the serious violation by the provisions of section 23 of the rights to equality and human dignity could not be justified in the new constitutional order. Section 23 accordingly had to be struck down in accordance with s 172(1)(a) of the Constitution.

=== Customary law of succession ===
The effect of the invalidation of section 23 of the Act was that the customary-law rules governing succession were inapplicable, including the customary-law rule of primogeniture attacked in the Bhe and Shibi cases.

The court accordingly held that, as a result of the inconsistency of section 23 with the Constitution, regulation 2(e) also had to fall away. The customary-law rule of primogeniture, in its application to intestate succession, was not consistent with the equality protection under the Constitution. It followed that any finding in Mthembu v Letsela and Another which was at odds with this judgment could not stand.

=== Remedy ===
In light of the wider relief requested by the South African Human Rights Commission and the Women's Legal Centre Trust, the relief given by the High Courts in both the Bhe and the Shibi cases fell to be reconsidered. It was also necessary to deal with the applicability of the order by the Constitutional Court to polygynous marriages. An appropriate order would be one that protected partners to monogamous and polygynous customary marriages as well as unmarried women and their respective children. This would ensure that their interests were protected until Parliament enacted a comprehensive scheme that would reflect the necessary development of the customary law of succession. It had to be clear, however, that no pronouncement was made in the present judgment on the constitutional validity of polygynous unions. In order to avoid possible inequality between the houses in such unions, the estate should devolve in such a way that persons in the same class or category received an equal share.

The advantage of using section 1 of the Intestate Succession Act as the basic mechanism for determining the content of the interim regime was that extra-marital children, women who were survivors in monogamous unions, unmarried women and all children would not be discriminated against. However, the section provided for only one surviving spouse and would need to be tailored to accommodate situations where there was more than one surviving spouse because the deceased was party to a polygynous union. This could be done by ensuring that sections 1(1)(c)(i) and 1(4)(f) of the Intestate Succession Act, which were concerned with providing for a child's share of the single surviving spouse and its calculation, should apply with three qualifications if the deceased is survived by more than one spouse:

1. A child's share would be determined by having regard to the fact that there was more than one surviving spouse.
2. Provision should be made for each surviving spouse to inherit the minimum if there was not enough in the estate.
3. The order had to take into account the possibility that the estate may not be enough to provide the prescribed minimum to each of the surviving spouses.

=== Retrospectivity ===
The court held that the declaration of invalidity had to be made retrospective to 27 April 1994, but that it did not apply to any completed transfer of ownership to an heir who had no notice of a challenge to the legal validity of the statutory provisions and the customary-law rule in question. Furthermore, anything done pursuant to the winding-up of an estate in terms of the Act, other than the identification of heirs in a manner inconsistent with this judgment, would not be invalidated by the order of invalidity in respect of section 23 of the Act and its regulations.

=== Effect ===
The court held that the order made in this case did not mean that the relevant provisions of the Intestate Succession Act were fixed rules that had to be applied regardless of any agreement by all interested parties that the estate should devolve in a different way. The spontaneous development of customary law would continue to be hampered if this were to happen. The Intestate Succession Act did not preclude an estate devolving in accordance with an agreement reached among all interested parties, but in a way that was consistent with its provisions. Having regard to the vulnerable position in which some of the surviving family members might find themselves, care had to be taken to ensure that such agreements were genuine and not the result of the exploitation of the weaker members of the family by the strong. In this regard, a special duty rested on the Master of the High Court, the magistrates and other officials responsible for the administration of estates to ensure that no-one was prejudiced in the discussions leading to the purported agreements.

The present judgment was concerned with intestate deceased estates governed by section 23 of the Act only. All such estates had henceforth to be administered in terms of the present judgment. The question arose as to the role of the Master of the High Court, magistrates and other officials appointed by the Master. Section 4(1A) of the Administration of Estates Act provided that the Master did not have jurisdiction over estates that devolved in terms of customary law. The effect of this judgment was to bring about a change in that respect. The Master was no longer precluded from dealing with intestate deceased estates that were formerly governed by section 23 of the Act, since they would now fall under the terms of this judgment and not customary law.

=== Order ===
Section 23 of the Act and section 1(4)(b) of the Intestate Succession Act were declared inconsistent with the Constitution and invalid. The Regulations for the Administration and Distribution of the Estates of Deceased Blacks (R200) published in Government Gazette No 10601 dated 6 February 1987, as amended, were also invalid. The rule of male primogeniture as it applied in customary law to the inheritance of property was inconsistent with the Constitution and invalid to the extent that it excluded or hindered women and extra-marital children from inheriting property.

Subject to the following, section 1 of the Intestate Succession Act applied to the intestate deceased estates that would formerly have been governed by section 23 of the Act. In the application of sections 1(1)(c)(i) and 1(4)(f) of the Intestate Succession Act to the estate of a deceased person who was survived by more than one spouse,

1. a child's share in relation to the intestate estate of the deceased had to be calculated by dividing the monetary value of the estate by a number equal to the number of the children of the deceased who have either survived or predeceased such deceased person but are survived by their descendants, plus the number of spouses who have survived such deceased;
2. each surviving spouse inherited a child's share of the intestate estate or so much of the intestate estate as did not exceed in value the amount fixed from time to time by the Minister for Justice and Constitutional Development by notice in the Gazette, whichever was the greater; and
3. notwithstanding the provisions of 2. above, where the assets in the estate were not sufficient to provide each spouse with the amount fixed by the Minister, the estate had to be equally divided between the surviving spouses.

In terms of section 172(1)(b) of the Constitution, the court held that the transfer of ownership prior to the date of this order of any property pursuant to the distribution of an estate in terms of s 23 of the Act and its regulations could not be invalidated unless it was established that, when such transfer was taken, the transferee was on notice that the property in question was subject to a legal challenge on the grounds upon which the applicants brought challenges in this case. It was further declared that any estate that was being administered in terms of section 23 of the Act and its regulations would continue to be so administered until it was finally wound up, subject to paragraphs 4, 5 and 6 of the order of Court.

=== Dissent ===
Ngcobo delivered a dissenting judgment in which he held that the rule of male primogeniture should be developed in order to bring it in line with the Bill of Rights.

== See also ==
- Customary law
- Customary law in South Africa
- Mmusi and Others v Ramantele and Another
