= Marital power =

In civil law jurisdictions, marital power (Latin: potestas maritalis, Dutch: maritale macht, Afrikaans: maritale mag) was a doctrine in terms of which a wife was legally an incapax under the usufructory tutorship (tutela usufructuaria) of her husband. The marital power included the power of the husband to administer both his wife's separate property and their community property. A wife was not able to leave a will, enter into a contract, or sue or be sued, in her own name or without the permission of her husband. It is very similar to the doctrine of coverture in the English common law, as well as to the Head and Master law property laws.

== Historical origins ==
The marital power derives from Germanic sources of the Roman-Dutch law, from which many features derive from (provincial) Roman law. In the earlier Roman law, a wife moved from the manus (guardianship) of her father to that of the father of her husband, an older brother of her husband or her husband; the "pater familias" or master of all persons and owner of all property in a familia. In the last century of the Republic and throughout the Empire a form of marriage did evolve which did not move a wife under the authority of her husband or his father, she remained under the authority of her family. Women later became independent by law (sui iuris) but had a male guardian appointed to them. Under the Germanic law as described by Johann Gottlieb Heineccius:

The marital power and guardianship of the husband is the right of the husband to rule over and defend the person of his wife, and to administer her goods in such a way as to dispose of them at his own will, or at any rate to prevent his wife from dealing with them except with his knowledge and consent.

— Elementa Juris Germanici.

In another form of Germanic marriage, Friedelehe, the control over the wife remained with the head of her family.

From the Germanic law sources it became part of the law of the Netherlands. When Dutch colonists settled at the Cape in the 17th century, they brought along the Roman-Dutch law, which managed to survive the British conquest in 1805. The spread of the Roman-Dutch law introduced the marital power doctrine so that it eventually formed part of the law of marriage in South Africa, Lesotho, Swaziland, Namibia, Botswana and Southern Rhodesia (as Zimbabwe was then known).

== 20th and 21st century restriction and abolition ==
Of the Southern African countries that apply Roman-Dutch law, every one except, as of 2012 Eswatini (then Swaziland) has abolished the marital power.

In Southern Rhodesia the marital power was abolished in 1928 by the Married Persons' Property Act, which also abolished community of property.

In France, marital power (puissance maritale) was abolished in 1938. However, the statutory abolition of the specific doctrine of marital power did not necessarily grant married women the same legal rights as their husbands (or as unmarried women) as has notably been the case in France, where the legal subordination of the wife (primarily coming from the Napoleonic Code) was gradually abolished with women obtaining full equality in marriage only in the 1980s.

In South Africa, the report of the Women's Legal Disabilities Commission in 1949 led to the enacting of the Matrimonial Affairs Act in 1953, which restricted but did not abolish the marital power. The Matrimonial Property Act, 1984 abolished it prospectively (i.e. for marriages contracted after the act came into force) but not for marriages between black people. An amendment in 1988 abolished it prospectively for marriages of black people under the civil law, but not for marriages contracted under customary law. A further amendment in 1993 repealed the marital power for all civil marriages, whenever they were contracted. The marital power persisted, however, in the Transkei (which was nominally independent from 1976 to 1994) but it was held to be unconstitutional for civil marriages by the Transkei High Court in 1999. In 2000 the Recognition of Customary Marriages Act abolished the marital power for all marriages under customary law throughout South Africa.

In the Netherlands marital power was abolished in 1958.

In Namibia the marital power was abolished in 1996 by the Married Persons Equality Act; in Botswana it was abolished in 2004 by the Abolition of Marital Power Act; and in Lesotho it was abolished in 2006 by the Married Persons Equality Act.

In Swaziland (now Eswatini), the marital power has recently been restricted, but not abolished (Sihlongonyane v Sihlongonyane (470/2013) [2013] SZHC 144 (18 July 2013)).

== See also ==
- Baron and feme
- Marriage bar
