= Civil partnership in South Africa =

Civil partnerships were introduced in South Africa by the Civil Union Act, 2006, which also legalised same-sex marriage. Civil partnerships can be formed by opposite-sex couples and by same-sex couples, and have the same rights, responsibilities and legal consequences as marriages.

== Terms ==
The parties to a civil partnership must be 18 or older and not already married or in a civil partnership. The prohibited degrees of affinity and consanguinuity that apply to a marriage under the Marriage Act also apply under the Civil Union Act; thus a person may not form a civil partnership with his or her direct ancestor or descendant, sibling, uncle or aunt, niece or nephew, or the ancestor or descendant of an ex-spouse.

== Formation ==
Civil partnerships must be solemnised by an authorised marriage officer. Government officials (primarily magistrates and Home Affairs civil servants) who are appointed as marriage officers under the Marriage Act are also automatically appointed to solemnise civil partnerships. Religious marriage officers may not solemnise civil partnerships. (They may, however, solemnise marriages under the Civil Union Act.)

== History ==
Originally, government marriage officers who had an objection of conscience to solemnising same-sex civil partnerships were exempted from doing so if they noted their objection in writing to the Minister of Home Affairs. This exemption was repealed in October 2020 with a two-year transitional period.

== Legal consequences ==
The legal consequences of a civil partnership are identical to those of a marriage under the Marriage Act, except for such changes as are required by the context. Any reference to marriage in any law, including the common law, is deemed to include civil partnership in terms of the Civil Union Act; similarly, any reference to husband, wife or spouse in any law is deemed to include a civil partner. The law of divorce for civil partnerships is the same as that for marriage.

The Civil Union Act makes no explicit provisions for the recognition of foreign unions. Based on the principle of lex loci celebrationis, a foreign marriage (including a same-sex marriage) is recognised as a marriage in South African law. However, the status of foreign forms of partnership other than marriage, such as civil unions or domestic partnerships, is not clear. In a 2010 divorce case the Western Cape High Court recognised the validity of a British civil partnership as equivalent to a civil partnership in South African law.
