= Simmons v. Simmons =

- Court: Connecticut Supreme Court
- Full case name: Duncan R. Simmons v. Aura R. Simmons
- Decided: March 24, 1998
- Citations: 708 A.2d 949; 244 Conn. 158

Court membership
- Judges sitting: Robert J. Callahan, Robert I. Berdon, Flemming L. Norcott Jr., Joette Katz, Francis M. McDonald Jr.

Case opinions
- Decision by: Callahan
- Concurrence: Berdon, Norcott, Katz, McDonald

Keywords
- Divorce; Marital property

Simmons v. Simmons, 708 A.2d 949 (1998), was a case decided by the Supreme Court of Connecticut that held that a medical degree is not a property interest subject to division during a divorce proceeding under a marital property regime.

== Decision ==
The plaintiff sought to acquire half of the expected value of her husband's medical degree during divorce proceedings. The plaintiff provided testimony about the earnings potential associated with a medical degree and sought half of the expected earnings associated with the degree. The court ruled that the medical degree was not a property interest subject to division, but rather simply an expectancy that may not even vest.
