= Marriage Act, 1961 (South Africa) =

Law in South Africa

Parliament of South Africa
- Long title: Act to consolidate and amend the laws relating to the solemnization of marriages and matters incidental thereto.
- Citation: Act No. 25 of 1961
- Territorial extent: South Africa
- Enacted by: Parliament of South Africa
- Assented to: 19 April 1961
- Commenced: 1 January 1962

Related legislation
- Civil Union Act, 2006
- Status: In force

The Marriage Act, 1961 (Act No. 25 of 1961) is an act of the Parliament of South Africa governing the solemnisation and registration of marriages in South Africa. It does not deal with the dissolution of marriages, which is governed by the Divorce Act, 1979, or with matrimonial property regimes and the financial consequences of marriage, which are governed by the Matrimonial Property Act, 1984. Some issues relating to marriage remain governed by the Roman-Dutch common law because they have never been addressed by Parliament.

The Marriage Act is not the only law under which a marriage may be contracted. The Recognition of Customary Marriages Act, 1998 recognises marriages under African customary law as valid marriages, though they are not legally identical to marriages under the Marriage Act. The Civil Union Act, 2006 allows for inter alia same-sex marriages which are legally equivalent to marriages under the Marriage Act.

Before 1961, the law of marriage in South Africa was based on the law of the four colonies that had been united in the Union of South Africa, and therefore differed between the provinces. The Marriage Act was enacted to consolidate the law and make it uniform across the country. The act has been amended several times since 1961, most notably in 1970 when banns of marriage were abolished.

== Marriage officers ==
A marriage may be performed only by a marriage officer. All magistrates and justices of the peace are automatically marriage officers. The Minister of Home Affairs (or an official authorised to act on behalf of the Minister) can appoint other civil service employees as marriage officers. In practice, many employees in local offices of the Department of Home Affairs are appointed as marriage officers.

The Minister of Home Affairs can also appoint ministers of religion or other religious leaders as marriage officers. The text of the Marriage Act limits these appointments to Christian, Jewish or Muslim clergy or clergy of "an Indian religion". (Ministers of other religions can be appointed marriage officers under the Civil Union Act.) A religious marriage officer may refuse to perform a marriage that does not comply with his or her religion's doctrines.

The Minister of Home Affairs can retrospectively validate the marriages performed by a person who is not legally a marriage officer who acts in good faith or if the spouses had a good faith belief that marriage officer could legally perform the marriage.

== Marriage procedure ==
Each party to the marriage must provide the marriage officer with his or her South African identity document or an affidavit detailing his or her identity. Since 1970, it has not been necessary to publish banns or obtain a licence, but anyone objecting to a marriage may submit an objection in writing with the marriage officer. If there is an objection, the officer must investigate it and decide whether or not the marriage would be lawful.

A marriage may be performed at any time, but a marriage officer may refuse to do so before eight in the morning or after four in the afternoon. Marriages may only be performed in religious buildings, government offices, or private homes; in all cases the doors of the building must be open. Other locations may be used if one of the parties is seriously ill or injured. Two witnesses must be present. Proxy marriages are not permitted.

The act prescribes a marriage formula to be spoken by the officer, unless their religion prescribes another formula. The officer asks each of the parties:

Do you, [name], declare that as far as you know there is no lawful impediment to your proposed marriage with [name] here present, and that you call all here present to witness that you take [name] as your lawful [wife/husband]?

When each of them has answered "Yes," and have joined hands, the official announces:

I declare that [name] and [name] here present have been lawfully married.

The officer, the spouses and the witnesses then sign the marriage register, which is sent to the Department of Home Affairs to be recorded.

A marriage officer may not demand any payment for performing a marriage, but a religious clergyman may accept a fee for blessing the marriage.

== Marriageable age ==
A person under the age of majority, which was reduced from 21 to 18 by the Children's Act, 2005, cannot marry without the consent of his or her parents or legal guardian. If there are no parents or guardian or for some reason they cannot give consent, a magistrate (acting as a commissioner of child welfare) may grant consent. If the parent, guardian or magistrate refuses consent, a judge of the High Court may grant consent if it is in the interests of the minor.

Further to the requirement for parental consent, no boy under 18 or girl under 15 can marry without the special consent of the Minister of Home Affairs (or an official authorised to act on behalf of the Minister). (This discrimination on the basis of sex predates the Constitution of the Republic of South Africa and may be unconstitutional but has not yet been challenged.)

== Offences and penalties ==
A marriage officer who knowingly performs a marriage which he is legally prohibited, and a person who is not a marriage officer but purports to perform a marriage, can be fined up to R400 and imprisoned for up to one year. A marriage officer who violates other provisions of the Marriage Act can be fined up to R100. A person who makes a false statement for the purpose of marriage can be sentenced as if he or she had committed perjury.

== Amendments ==
- The Marriage Amendment Act, 1963 and the Marriage Amendment Act, 1968 were both technical amendments relating to the publication of banns of marriage or notices of intention to marry and the validity of special marriage licences.
- The Marriage Amendment Act, 1970 abolished the requirement that banns of marriage or notices of intention to marry be published or that a special marriage licence be obtained. It also extended the application of the Marriage Act to the territory of South-West Africa (now the independent country of Namibia).
- The Marriage Amendment Act, 1972 validated marriages contracted before the 1970 amendment came into force where banns or notice had not been correctly published or a special licence had not been correctly obtained.
- The Marriage Amendment Act, 1973 allowed religious marriage officers to follow their religion's marriage formula to solemnise the marriage instead of using the formula prescribed in the act.
- The Marriage Amendment Act, 1981 inserted a provision allowing the Minister of Home Affairs to validate marriage conducted by someone who was not a marriage officer when the spouses had a good faith belief that he or she was a marriage officer.
- The Marriage Act Extension Act, 1997 extended the act to apply in the territory of the former bantustans, superseding their former separate marriage laws.

== See also ==
- Marriage law
- Marriage in South Africa
