= Recognition of Customary Marriages Act, 1998 =

Parliament of South Africa
- Long title: Act to make provision for the recognition of customary marriages; to specify the requirements for a valid customary marriage; to regulate the registration of customary marriages; to provide for the equal status and capacity of spouses in customary marriages; to regulate the proprietary consequences of customary marriages and the capacity of spouses of such marriages; to regulate the dissolution of customary marriages; to provide for the making of regulations; to repeal certain provisions of certain laws; and to provide for matters connected therewith.
- Citation: Act No. 120 of 1998
- Territorial extent: Republic of South Africa
- Assented to: 20 November 1998
- Commenced: 15 November 2000

Related legislation
- Marriage Act, 1961; Divorce Act, 1979; Matrimonial Property Act, 1984
- Status: In force

The Recognition of Customary Marriages Act, 1998 (Act No. 120 of 1998) is a South African statute in terms of which marriages performed under African customary law, including polygynous marriages, are recognised as legal marriages. It also reformed the law relating to the legal status of women in customary marriages, the financial consequences of a customary marriage and the dissolution of customary marriages, replacing the customary law with statutory provisions. The act was signed by President Nelson Mandela on 20 November 1998 but only came into force on 15 November 2000.

== Provisions ==
All customary marriages which were valid under customary law when the act came into force, whether monogamous or polygamous, are recognised as marriages for all legal purposes. Marriages contracted after the act came into force are only recognised if they comply with the requirements imposed by the act. These requirements are that the spouses are 18 or older, that they both consent to the marriage, and that neither of them are already married under the Marriage Act or the Civil Union Act. The age requirement may be waived by the special written permission of the minister of home affairs or her delegate.

The spouses are obliged to register the marriage with the Department of Home Affairs within three months; for marriages which existed before the act came into force, there was a one-year period for registration. Both of these periods were repeatedly extended up to the end of 2010. However, a customary marriage is valid even if it is not registered, and there is no penalty for failure to register.

The act declares that a wife in a customary marriage has equal legal status and capacity as her husband, including the ability to buy, own and sell property and the ability to enter into contracts. Previously, under customary law a wife had been regarded as perpetually a minor under the control of her husband (see also marital power). All monogamous marriages contracted after the act came into force are in community of property, meaning that all assets and liabilities belong to both spouses equally, unless an antenuptial contract is drawn up. If a man wants to contract a second simultaneous marriage he must apply to a court to approve a contract regulating the financial relationships between him, his current wife or wives and the new wife. The act states that the financial status of marriages that existed before the act came into force continues to be regulated by customary law; however in the case of Gumede (born Shange) v President of the Republic of South Africa and Others the Constitutional Court found this unconstitutional and determined that such marriages, if monogamous, are to be treated as marriages in community of property.

The act applies the civil divorce law (the Divorce Act, 1979) to customary marriages, meaning that a customary marriage can only be dissolved by the High Court or a regional civil magistrate's court and only on the grounds of irretrievable breakdown of the marriage. The power of traditional leaders and other customary institutions to grant divorces is ended, but they may still mediate in spousal disputes before the legal divorce.

== Sources ==
- Bronstein, Victoria (2000). "Confronting Custom in the New South African State: An Analysis of the Recognition of Customary Marriages Act 120 of 1998". South African Journal on Human Rights. 16 (3): 558–575. doi:10.1080/02587203.2000.11827604. S2CID 218602587.
- Herbst, Marissa; du Plessis, Willemien (2008). "Customary Law v Common Law Marriages: A Hybrid Approach in South Africa". Journal of Comparative Law. 3 (1): 105–118.
- Maithufi, IP; Bekker, JC (2002). "The recognition of the Customary Marriages Act of 1998 and its impact on family law in South Africa". Comparative and International Law Journal of Southern Africa. 35 (2): 182–197.
- Mamashela, Mothokoa (2004). "New Families, New Property, New Laws: The Practical Effects of the Recognition of Customary Marriages Act". South African Journal on Human Rights. 20 (4): 616–641. doi:10.1080/19962126.2004.11865165. S2CID 143406508.
