= Mmusi and Others v Ramantele and Another =

2012 case of the High Court of Botswana

- Court: High Court of Botswana
- Decided: 12 October 2012

Court membership
- Judge sitting: Key Dingake

Mmusi and Others v Ramantele and Another is a 2012 case of the High Court of Botswana in which three sisters disputed their nephew's right to inherit the family home under customary inheritance laws that favoured male descendants. The court ruled that these laws were unconstitutional, asserting for the first time the right of Batswana women to inherit property.

== Background ==
In 2012, Botswana's gender gap was below the global average. Considered an "example to the region", the country had been home to several of southern Africa's most powerful women, including a parliamentary speaker, an attorney general, and a judge, Unity Dow. However, it is also governed by a dual legal system consisting of the government's civil courts and traditional customary courts, the latter found primarily in rural areas. The customary courts had traditionally upheld the principle of "assumed male inheritance".

The customary law in question, that of the Ngwaketse tribe, dictated that the family home of a deceased individual was to be reserved to the last born male child. The rest of the property was to be divided among the children, regardless of gender.

== Mmusi case ==
In 2007, Edith Mmusi and her sisters, all of whom were over 65, brought a case against their nephew Molefi Ramantele, who had inherited the family home near Kanye. At some point prior to the distribution of their father's inheritance, their youngest brother, expecting to inherit the family home in accordance with local customs, entered into an agreement with his half-brother, the father of Molefi Ramantele, to give him the home. Both brothers died shortly after their father's death and before the distribution of the inheritance. Ramantele subsequently claimed ownership over the family home, arguing that his father was promised the family home under an agreement and that home would now pass onto him, and attempted to evict Mmusi and her sisters, who had occupied the home until this point. The sisters contested the eviction, arguing that they had paid for the home's upkeep costs as well as expanding it.

The 2007 case was heard in customary court, which found in Ramantele's favour. After an appeal failed, the sisters took the case to Botswana's civil courts. The suit eventually reached the High Court, where it was heard by a progressive judge, Key Dingake. The sisters were opposed by Attorney General Athalia Molokomme. Representing the government of Botswana, Molokomme argued that though the inheritance law was discriminatory, the "public mood" did not yet support its repeal. The sisters were supported in the case by the Southern Africa Litigation Centre (SALC).

On 12 October 2012, Dingake ruled that the local customary laws prioritising male inheritance were not in keeping with the promise of gender equality in the Constitution of Botswana, and awarded the home to the sisters. In his judgement, Dingake stated, "It seems to me that the time has now arisen for the justices of this court to assume the role of the judicial midwife and assist in the birth of a new world struggling to be born. Discrimination against gender has no place in our modern day society."

Edith Mmusi hailed the case as "a great day for us," while Ramantele called it "a sad day," stating that "people should learn to respect our culture." Regional human rights campaigners expressed hope that the case would not only be a landmark in Botswana, but also set a precedent for surrounding countries grappling with similar issues. The Open Society Initiative for Southern Africa described it as "a huge boost to the struggle for gender equality," while SALC's deputy director said that the ruling "sends a very strong signal that women in Botswana cannot be discriminated against and that the days of women suffering from secondary status under the law in Botswana are drawing to an end."

== Further developments ==
On 16 November 2012, Ramantele indicated that he will appeal the High Court judgment.

On 3 September 2013, the Court of Appeal upheld the decision of the high court, stating that "Constitutional values of equality before the law, and the increased leveling of the power structures with more and more women heading households and participating with men as equals in the public sphere and increasingly in the private sphere, demonstrate that there is no rational and justifiable basis for sticking to the narrow norms of days gone by when such norms go against current value systems".

== See also ==
- Bhe v Magistrate, Khayelitsha
- Primogeniture
