= Polygamy in South Africa =

Adopting more than one Husband or Wife, at the same date and time

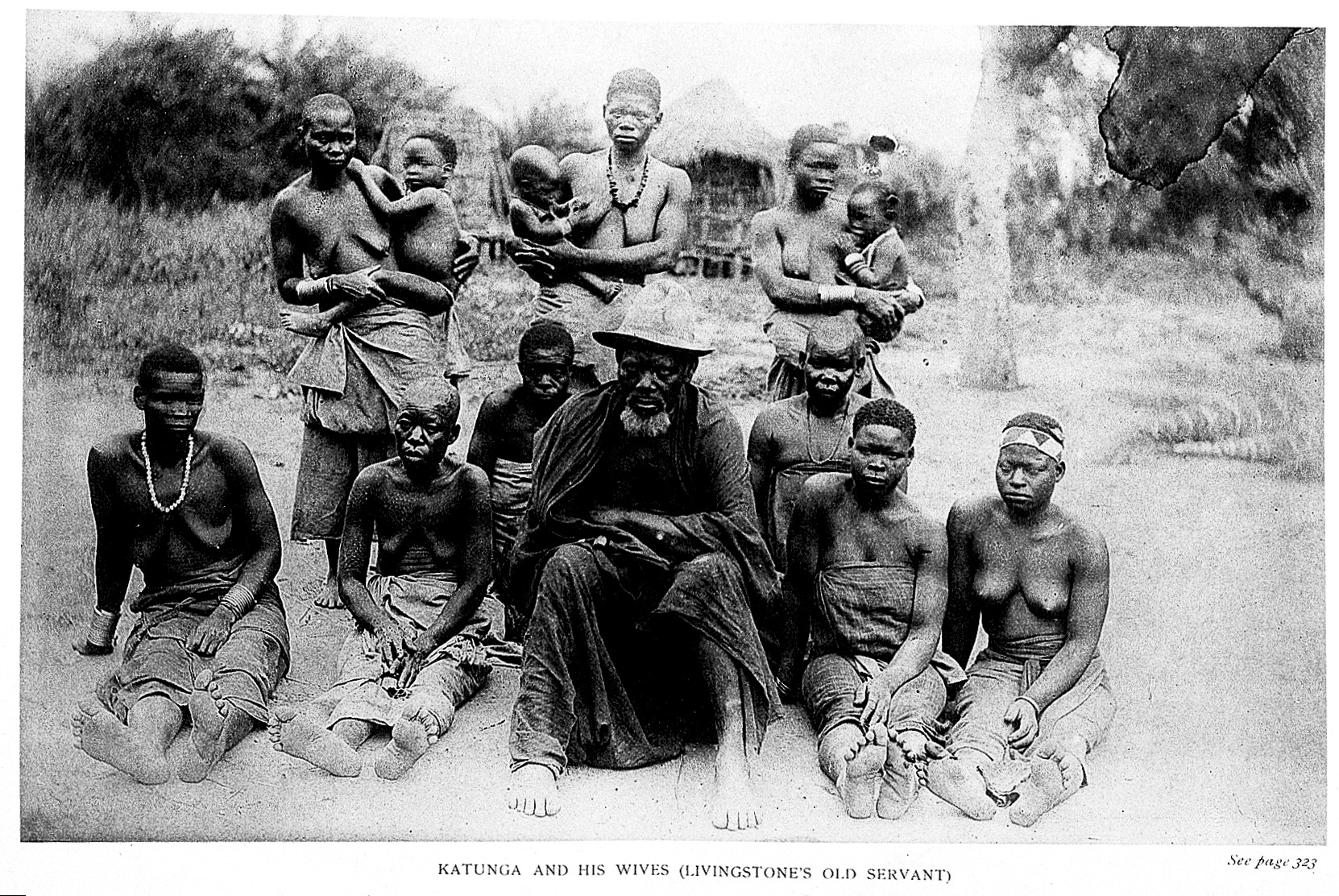

Polygamy is legal under certain circumstances in South Africa.

== Legal status ==
Polygamous marriages entered into in accordance with the provisions of the Recognition of Customary Marriages Act are legal. A husband in an existing customary marriage wishing to marry a second wife must apply to a competent court for such a marriage to be legal. Hence, former President Jacob Zuma currently has four legally recognised wives.

The court considers the interests of all parties to the marriage and may add whatever conditions the court deems just for the polygamous marriage to be valid under customary law. Polygamous marriages are not allowed under the Marriage Act and the Civil Unions Act.

A person married under the Civil Union Act, which allows same-sex couples to marry, may not enter into marriage with a second partner until the existing marriage is dissolved. Therefore, only men are allowed to marry more than one spouse of the opposite sex at the same time.

== Cultural ==
South African traditionalists have been well known to practice polygamy and the topic has been a serious political issue in the past several years, especially in the 2009 elections. Many of the indigenous Bantu peoples, both Christians and Indigenous, are polygamous. Islamic South Africans among the Cape Malays, Cape Coloureds, and Indian South Africans allow for polygamy.

== Works ==
- Uthando Nes’thembu is a South African reality TV series on Mzansi Magic that follows polygamist Zulu businessman Musa Mseleku and his four wives, MaCele, MaYeni, MaKhumalo, and MaNgwabe.
- The Polygamist, a 2026 telenovela
