= National Movement of Rural Women =

Organization in South Africa

The National Movement of Rural Women (NMRW) is a nonprofit, grassroots organization founded in South Africa in 1990. It was formerly known as the Rural Women's Movement (RWM). The purpose of NMRW was to give a voice to rural women in South Africa. Many women in the 1990s were not able to inherit land or speak freely about problems they faced in the community. In addition, until 1994, married black women were considered minors by the law. NMRW has also been a champion of the recognition of customary law. NMRW has helped women set up their own methods of employment and to resist oppressive traditions in customary law. NMRW is headquartered in Marshalltown.

== History ==
The Rural Women's Movement (RWM) was launched in 1986, in Mathopestad, funded and organised by Black Sash and its sub-committee, TRAC. The aim was to unify rural women facing forced removals, and give them a voice. TRAC employed Lydia Kompe, a trade unionist and rural women's advocate, to coordinate the RWM. In 1986, Nomhlangano Beauty Mkhize was elected chairperson. RWM worked as an umbrella organization to "mobilize over 500 women's groups." With help from the Transvaal Rural Action Committee (TRAC), in June 1991, RWM drafted an organizational constitution. RWM had several objectives in place by 1993, including increasing women's participation in village meetings or kgotlas, meeting with the government, changing "oppressive traditions," access to land for both single and married women, and women's representation in negotiations and government. Because it was taboo, according to custom, for women to speak out in public meetings, those who "did speak out were often beaten by their husbands for doing so and over 50 per cent of RWM's membership faced domestic violence." Another issue faced by RWM was illegal land sales and levies charged by traditional leaders.

In 2008, RWM obtained a lease for a farm near Mpophomeni township where they would be able to build a training facility.

Later, the RWM changed its name to the National Movement of Rural Women (NMRW).
