= Matrimonial regime =

System of property ownership between spouses

Matrimonial regimes, or marital property systems, are systems of property ownership between spouses providing for the creation or absence of a marital estate and if created, what properties are included in that estate, how and by whom it is managed, and how it will be divided and inherited at the end of the marriage. Matrimonial regimes are applied either by operation of law or by way of prenuptial agreement in civil-law countries, and depend on the lex domicilii of the spouses at the time of or immediately following the wedding. (See e.g. Quebec Civil Code and French Civil Code, arts. 431-492.).

In most common law jurisdictions, the default and only matrimonial regime is separation of property, though some US states, known as community property states, are an exception. Also, in England, the birthplace of common law, pre-nuptial agreements were until recently completely unrecognized, and although the principle of separation of property prevailed, Courts are enabled to make a series of orders upon divorce regulating the distribution of assets.

Civil-law and bijuridical jurisdictions, including Quebec, Louisiana, France, South Africa, Italy, Germany, Switzerland, and many others, have statutory default matrimonial regimes, in addition to or, in some cases, in lieu of regimes that can only be contracted by prenuptial agreements. Generally, couples marry into some form of community of property by default, or instead contract out under separation of property or some other regime through a prenuptial agreement passed before a civil-law notary or other public officer solemnizing the marriage. Many civil law jurisdictions also have other established systems of dividing property, such as separation of property and the participation regime that spouses can decide to adopt.

Five countries, including the Netherlands, have signed on to the Hague Convention on the Law applicable to Matrimonial Property Regimes, which entered into force on 1 September 1992, which allows spouses to choose not only the regimes offered by their country, but also any regime in force in the country where at least one is a citizen or resident or where marital real estate is situated.

== Coverture ==
Coverture (sometimes spelled couverture) was a legal doctrine whereby, upon marriage, a woman's legal rights were subsumed by those of her husband. Coverture was enshrined in the common law of England and the United States throughout most of the 19th century. The idea was described in William Blackstone's Commentaries on the Laws of England in the late 18th century.

Under traditional English common law an adult unmarried woman was considered to have the legal status of feme sole, while a married woman had the status of feme covert. These are English spellings of medieval Anglo-Norman phrases (the modern standard French spellings would be femme seule 'single woman' and femme couverte, literally 'covered woman').

A feme sole had the right to own property and make contracts in her own name. A feme covert was not recognized as having legal rights and obligations distinct from those of her husband in most respects. Instead, through marriage a woman's existence was incorporated into that of her husband, so that she had very few recognized individual rights of her own. A married woman could not own property, sign legal documents or enter into a contract, obtain an education against her husband's wishes, or keep a salary for herself. If a wife was permitted to work, under the laws of coverture she was required to relinquish her wages to her husband.

This situation persisted until the mid-to-late 19th century, when married women's property acts started to be passed in many English-speaking legal jurisdictions, setting the stage for further reforms.

== Separate property systems ==
Separate property systems are based on the premise that marriage is solely an interpersonal union

- Separate Property: All property, pre-marital or marital, is owned separately. (French: séparation de biens, Spanish: separación de bienes, Dutch: scheiding van goederen, koude uitsluiting, German: Gütertrennung, Italian: separazione dei beni)
- Separate Property with Equitable Distribution: Under this system, when substantially more property acquired during a marriage is owned by one spouse (e.g. title to all marital property is held in the husband's name only), the courts will make an equitable distribution of the richer spouse's property at death or dissolution of the marriage. The object is to prevent widow(er)s and divorce(e)s, and their minor children, being cast into poverty by the death or divorce of the richer spouse.
- Accrual System (South Africa) or Deferred Community Property (Canada): Marital property is separately owned during the marriage, but after marriage (divorce, death of a spouse), the net assets are lumped together as property in joint tenancy and divided. (French participation aux acquêts, Spanish participación, Dutch deelgenootschap, Afrikaans aanwasbedeling, Standard German Zugewinngemeinschaft, Swiss German Errungenschaftsbeteiligung, Italian partecipazione agli acquisti, Brazilian Portuguese participação final nos aquestos).
- Common law system in the United states: the traditional common law system in the United States did not recognize "marital property." Regardless of the length of marriage, each spouse retain ownership over property titled under that spouse's name and property acquired with that spouse's own earnings. However, a strict common law system is no longer the system of any U.S. state as of 2022, with most states instead classifying marital property and separate property, and distributing marital property based on the principle of equitable distribution.
  - Tenancy by the Entirety (United States): "TBE" is a separate property system in which spouses are treated as one person, each having an equal ownership interest in the subject property. In some U.S. states, tenancy by the entirety is limited to realty (e.g. the couple take title to the family home as tenants by the entirety) while other states make it available for both realty and personality (e.g. the couple can also take title to the family automobile as tenants by the entirety).

== Community property systems ==
Community property is premised on the theory that marriage creates an economic community between the spouses and that the marital property attaches to that interpersonal community, rather than to the spouses themselves. There are several types of community property systems.

== Participation system ==
The participation system is a system of property division among spouses introduced in many civil law jurisdictions. In Spanish it is known as régimen de participación, in French participation aux acquêts, and in German Zugewinngemeinschaft or Errungenschaftsbeteiligung.

The participation system is hybrid matrimonial regime with separation of property during the marriage, along with a right of each spouse to participate in a percentage of profits from acquests (property acquired during marriage) at the time of marital dissolution.

In Germany, it was introduced with the Equality Act of 1957. In Germany and Switzerland, this regime is particularly widespread and is the default regime in the absence of a marriage contract. In France, it was introduced by a 1965 law, inspired by the German model. The participation system is also available in Spain, Portugal and many Latin American countries. In South African law it is known as the accrual system, and was introduced by the Matrimonial Property Act, 1984.

== See also ==
- Community property
- Prenuptial agreement
- Simmons v. Simmons (1998)
