= Customary law in South Africa =

Unwritten laws practised by indigenous communities

South African customary law refers to a usually uncodified legal system developed and practised by the indigenous communities of South Africa. Customary law has been defined as

an established system of immemorial rules evolved from the way of life and natural wants of the people, the general context of which was a matter of common knowledge, coupled with precedents applying to special cases, which were retained in the memories of the chief and his councilors, their sons and their sons' sons until forgotten, or until they became part of the immemorial rules as well as gender

Most African states follow a pluralistic form of law that includes customary law, religious laws, received law (such as common law or civil law) and state legislation. The South African Constitution recognizes traditional authority and customary law under Section 211. A ruling under Bhe v. Magistrate, Khayelitsha specified that customary law was "protected by and subject to the Constitution in its own right." Customary law, prior to colonialism, had its "sources in the practices, traditions and customs of the people." Customary law is fluid, and changes over time and among different groups of people. In addition, ethnicity is often tied into customary law. Sally Falk Moore suggests that to have a more realistic idea of the manner in which people live according to 'the law' and 'social mores' it is necessary to study the law in the context of society, rather than attempting to separate the 'law' from 'society'.

== History ==
=== Colonial era ===
Developments in customary law took place primarily after 1652, when colonial settlers arrived in South Africa. It didn't take long for the coloniser to realise that colonial law was not always appropriate or convenient for the colonised in dealing with instances of everyday life (such as family law). Accordingly, the colonial state began to define the parameters that marked the jurisdictions of legal systems within its control and, in so doing, divided colonial and customary law into "separate and [allegedly] autonomous spheres." In addition, there were many different types of customary law, each based on the indigenous group practicing the law.

Mahmood Mamdani has emphasised Theophilus Shepstone's role in creating the system known today as indirect rule and, with it, a system of official customary law. As the highest colonial official in Natal, Shepstone was responsible for all native affairs from the creation of the colony until his transfer to the Transvaal in 1877. He combined indigenous customs with British legal procedures to create what was called "native customary law." Combining these two types of law into one allowed the colonizers to "use" traditional leaders and traditional ceremonies to support their own legal legitimacy in South Africa. The "Shepstone system" enforced a "patriarchal arrangement" of hierarchy and became the foundation of policy for dealing with indigenous peoples in South Africa for many decades afterwards.

In 1847, the Natal Commission found that any "African law which was not incompatible with Roman-Dutch law would have to be used for the time being." In Natal, customary law was further recognized through the Natal Code of 1878. The code defined "native law" and "included the subjugation of women to men, the subjugation of children their father or to the head of the family, and the rule of primogeniture." The Northern Republics of South Africa (Transvaal and the Free State) were less inclined to allow or accommodate a system of African customary law that was separate to the Republican law.

The British defeat by the Zulu in 1879 and the Zulu rebellion of 1906 had profound effects on South African law and customary law in Natal. Likewise, the Cape Colony met customary law with a policy of assimilation. The assimilation was started by the abolition of slavery and lip service was given to the notion of 'rights to all', regardless of race. In 1880, the government looked into native laws and customs in order to codify criminal and civil law. Natives were never used as a source of information for their own culture. However, many objections stifled assimilation, including the colonial objection to customary practices pertaining to inheritance and marriage, especially in regard to polygamy and bride prices.

After the Union of South Africa was created in 1910, customary law was handled by each separate territory as needed. Because of the confusion created by this system, the union government created the Native Administration Act of 1927. This law, in Section 11, recognised customary law, so that it would be "granted full recognition in both chiefly and Commissioner courts," with the commissioner deciding where and when customary law may be applied.

=== Apartheid era ===
After the National Party gained power in 1948, it introduced apartheid, under which the Bantu Authorities Act of 1951 was used to create "an administrative hierarchy of tribal, regional, and territorial authorities in traditional communities."

=== Constitutional transition ===
The status of African customary law was a hotly contested issue during the negotiations to end apartheid and concomitant constitutional negotiations. A supreme constitution would allow for judicial review of the actions of traditional leaders as well as for scrutiny and amendment of customary law more generally. Constituencies of traditional leaders, who were represented at the Multi-Party Negotiating Forum, argued that customary law should be exempted from the application of the future Bill of Rights. They based their arguments partly on the Zimbabwean Constitution. (Note: The Zimbabwean constitution shields customary law from the provision forbidding discrimination at s 23(1) and (3)(b)) Much of the debate centred on the issue of gender equality, because certain tenets of customary law accord more rights and authority to men than they do women. Moreover, critics pointed out that customary law had been perverted by colonial and apartheid rule. At times, the bargaining process was used as a means to secure the role of the traditional leaders in the new constitutional era.

The Interim Constitution of South Africa came into effect on 27 April 1994, the date of South Africa's first democratic elections. After an intensive negotiation process in the Constitutional Assembly and certification by the newly established Constitutional Court, the final Constitution of South Africa was passed in 1996 and came into force in early 1997.

In terms of the eventually rejected Traditional Courts Bill introduced in 2008, power would have been consolidated with traditional leaders.

== Constitutional recognition of customary law ==
Section 211 of the Constitution of 1996 recognises customary law and requires South African courts to "apply customary law when that law is applicable, subject to the Constitution and any legislation that specifically deals with customary law". The status of customary law is also protected indirectly by various provisions of the Bill of Rights, mostly notably the right to freedom of belief and opinion and the rights to culture and cultural community. The application of customary law is subject to the Constitution as well as to any legislation that specifically deals with it. (Note: The applicability of customary law rules is governed by the common law choice of law rules.)

== Constitutional Court case law ==
There have been a number of cases that have come before the Constitutional Court requiring it to interpret and apply the rights and principles in the Constitution pertaining to African customary law (ACL). In doing so, the CC has not only been faced with the challenge of elucidating the extent to which ACL is now recognised, but it has also had to address the issue of how to go about ascertaining what that law in fact is. The first such substantive case is Alexkor v Richtersveld Community, which involved the appeal of a claim for restitution of land by the Richtersveld Community ('the Community'), an indigenous South African community, in terms of the Restitution of Land Rights Act. The Constitutional Court therefore had to examine whether or not the Community had rights in land in 1913 and, if so, whether or not it was subsequently dispossessed 'as a result of past racially discriminatory laws or practices.' It was in answering the first of these questions that the Court made various authoritative comments regarding the extent to which ACL is now recognised.

The Court essentially stated two broad principles. Firstly, ACL is an independent source of law, not to be interpreted 'through the common-law lens.' Instead, it is to be seen as parallel to the common law. Secondly, the recognition of ACL is circumscribed by its consistency with the Constitution and any legislation concerning ACL. The CC drew specifically on s 211(3) of the Constitution. Applying these principles, the Court found that the Community did indeed have (indigenous) rights in land in 1913, which were left unaltered by British annexation. It then added an important third principle – that customary law in the Constitution really referred to the living form of that law:

…It is important to note that indigenous law is not a fixed body of formally classified and easily ascertainable rules. By its very nature it evolves as the people who live by its norms change their patterns of life…In applying indigenous law, it is important to bear in mind that, unlike common law, indigenous law is not written. It is a system of law that was known to the community, practised and passed on from generation to generation. It is a system of law that has its own values and norms. Throughout its history it has evolved and developed to meet the changing needs of the community. And it will continue to evolve within the context of its values and norms consistently with the Constitution.

The court specifically acknowledged the difficulty of establishing customary law, given the relative unreliability of written sources on customary law, and the fact that there may be competing versions of customary law presented in evidence, when such is appealed to.

In a subsequent case of Shilubana and Others v Nwamitwa, the Constitutional Court spelled out the principles that should govern how living customary law rules are identified by courts and when courts should develop the customary law. Ms Shilubana, of the Valoyi traditional community, which is located in the Limpopo Province of South Africa, was appointed as hosi (chief) of her people contrary to the past practice of the eldest son of the previous hosi succeeding his father as the new hosi. The resolution adopted in appointing her specifically referred to the constitutional provision for gender equality as part of the community's motivation in adapting its rules. Mr Nwamitwa sought to dispute Ms Shilubana's appointment based on his purported right as the eldest son of the previous hosi. The matter was decided in favour of Mr Nwamitwa in both the High Court and the SCA, and the case was eventually taken on appeal to the Constitutional Court. In a unanimous judgment, the Court decided that Ms Shilubana was legitimately appointed as hosi of the Valoyi people. The Court emphasised the fact that ACL is a living system of law not bound by historical precedent. Because of this, it set aside a series of prior decisions that had set a test for determining the content of customary law by referencing long-standing and historical practices. The Court found that ACL is meant to reflect the current practices of a particular community and hence is developed with reference to the constantly evolving practices that indicate the current system of norms by which that community has chosen to live. The Court therefore held that the ACL regarding the hosi had legitimately developed to allow for a woman to be appointed and that this development was consistent with the Constitution. Therefore, the appeal was upheld, the Court finding that Ms Shilubana had been validly appointed.

The precedent of Shilubana stopped courts from avoiding the difficulties by devising a test that finally forced them to confront these challenges directly. Woodman refers to the second option as "selective legal pluralism" and affords the state with the opportunity to consider the needs of justice in each case involving customary law. Consequently, Woodman argues that to achieve justice, elements of state law pluralism should coincide with deep legal pluralism with the operation of is doctrine of selective legal pluralism. It would seem that, in this decision, the Constitutional Court espoused Woodman's theory of "selective legal pluralism". Woodman refers to two options available at this point; either an unqualified tolerance can be afforded to customary law, or allowance can be made for the purposeful and principled intrusion by the state into the field of customary law.

== Ethnicity ==
Customary law in South Africa is tied to ethnicity, so that "a Zulu who desires expressly or by implication to be bound by Sotho customary law could be faced with considerable difficulties despite the promise of section 30 of the Constitution." Customary law and ethnicity has roots in the idea of kinship, which colonizers used to enforce morality within tribes and between tribes.

== Women's rights and family law ==
Feminist activists tend to see the recognition of customary law as a threat to the rights and interests of women. Women have been denied many rights under customary law and were even seen as legal minors, regardless of their age. Women seeking redress in a traditional court may, according to customary law, be unable to represent herself.

As a result, most strategies to secure women's land rights in rural South Africa have tended to avoid the customary law arena and instead favoured formal legal initiatives. However, Aninka Claassens and Sindiso Mnisi advocate that legal strategies to support women's rights cannot avoid the customary law arena and should, in fact, engage with it fully. This is because of the impact of ACL on power relations, which means that rural women have no option but to grapple with issues of rights and custom at the local level. Legal strategies therefore need to pay attention to the legal changes taking place outside the statutory law arena, where women are playing a key role in negotiating the content of rights under custom, and appealing to both the discourses of rights and custom as they do so. The National Movement of Rural Women (NMRW) was created to help rural women keep control of their land and to give them a greater voice in government.

The customary law of marriage and succession are the main areas in which the South African legislature and courts have attempted to advance women's rights. In respect of the law of succession, the Constitutional Court held in Bhe v Magistrate, Khayelitsha that the customary rule of male primogeniture is unconstitutional. In respect of marriage, the first democratic Parliament passed the Recognition of Customary Marriages Act of 1998, which codified and reformed the law of African customary marriages, including polygynous marriages. The Act defines customary law broadly, as including all "the customs and usages traditionally observed among the indigenous African peoples of South Africa and form part of the culture of those peoples".

While granting legal recognition to African customary marriages, the Act also requires that legally valid customary marriages must henceforth comply with various statutory requirements, intended to rid the customary law of marriage of certain discriminatory elements. In terms of the Act, customary marriages may, like civil marriages, be registered with the Department of Home Affairs. Considering the legislation in Gumede v President, the Constitutional Court described it, per Deputy Chief Justice Dikgang Moseneke, as "a belated but welcome and ambitious legislative effort to remedy the historical humiliation and exclusion" suffered by spouses in customary marriages.

== See also ==
- Law of South Africa
- Legal pluralism
- African Charter on Human and Peoples' Rights
- Cultural rights
- Indigenous peoples
- Declaration on the Rights of Indigenous Peoples
- Indigenous and Tribal Peoples Convention, 1989
- Indigenous and Tribal Populations Convention, 1957
- National House of Traditional Leaders
