= Civil Union Act, 2006 =

Act of the South African Parliament

Parliament of South Africa
- Long title: Act to provide for the solemnisation of civil unions, by way of either a marriage or civil partnership; the legal consequences of civil unions; and to provide for matters incidental thereto.
- Citation: Act No. 17 of 2006
- Passed by: National Assembly
- Passed: 14 November 2006
- Passed by: National Council of Provinces
- Passed: 28 November 2006
- Assented to: 29 November 2006
- Commenced: 30 November 2006

Legislative history

First chamber: National Assembly
- Bill title: Civil Union Bill
- Bill citation: B 26—2006
- Introduced by: Nosiviwe Mapisa-Nqakula, Minister of Home Affairs
- Introduced: 31 August 2006
- First reading: 12 September 2006
- Second reading: 14 November 2006

Amended by
- Civil Union Amendment Act, 2020

Related legislation
- Marriage Act, 1961
- Status: In force

The Civil Union Act, 2006 (Act No. 17 of 2006) is an act of the Parliament of South Africa which legalised same-sex marriage. It allows two people, regardless of gender, to form either a marriage or a civil partnership. The act was enacted as a consequence of the judgment of the Constitutional Court in the case of Minister of Home Affairs v Fourie, which ruled that it was unconstitutional for the state to provide the benefits of marriage to opposite-sex couples while denying them to same-sex couples.

== Legislative history ==
The Constitutional Court's judgment set a deadline of 1 December 2006 for Parliament to rectify the situation. If Parliament missed the deadline, words would be "read in" to the Marriage Act to allow same-sex marriages to take place.

On 24 August 2006, the Cabinet approved the Civil Union Bill for submission to Parliament. It was introduced in the National Assembly by the Minister of Home Affairs on 12 September. The original bill only allowed for civil partnerships between same-sex partners, and also included provisions to recognise domestic partnerships between unmarried partners, both same-sex and opposite-sex. The bill was amended by the Portfolio Committee on Home Affairs to allow both marriages and civil partnerships, and to open them to opposite-sex as well as same-sex couples. The committee also removed the provisions dealing with unregistered domestic partnerships.

The final vote in the National Assembly was held on 14 November. The ruling African National Congress called a three line whip, requiring its MPs to vote for the bill. Most opposition parties voted against it, while the Democratic Alliance allowed its MPs a conscience vote. The bill passed by 229 votes to 41 with two abstentions. The National Council of Provinces passed it on 28 November by 36 votes to 11 with one abstention. It was signed on 29 November by Deputy President Phumzile Mlambo-Ngcuka (acting for President Thabo Mbeki) and came into force the following day.

== Provisions ==
A civil union may be contracted under the act by a same-sex or opposite-sex couple, and they may choose to form it either as a marriage or as a civil partnership. Whichever name is chosen, the legal consequences of a civil union are the same as those of a marriage under the Marriage Act. Any reference to marriage in any law is deemed to include a civil union, and any reference to a husband, wife or spouse is deemed to include a spouse or partner in a civil union.

A person may not contract a marriage or civil partnership if he or she is already married (or civilly partnered) under the Civil Union Act, the Marriage Act, or the Recognition of Customary Marriages Act. Both partners must be 18 or older and mentally competent. The same prohibited degrees of consanguinuity and affinity apply as would apply under the Marriage Act.

A marriage or civil partnership must be solemnized by a marriage officer in the presence of the partners and two witnesses. The solemnization may occur in a public office, a private house, or in premises used for the purpose by the marriage officer. The marriage officer asks each partner:

"Do you, A.B., declare that as far as you know there is no lawful impediment to your proposed marriage [or civil partnership] with C.D. here present, and that you call all here present to witness that you take C.D. as your lawful spouse [or civil partner]?"

and when each partner has said "yes", the marriage officer solemnizes the marriage by saying:

"I declare that A.B. and C.D. here present have been lawfully joined in a marriage [or civil partnership]."

Secular marriage officers under the Marriage Act – magistrates and Home Affairs officials – are automatically marriage officers for the purposes of the Civil Union Act. Marriage officers who are ministers of religion are not marriage officers for the purposes of the Civil Union Act unless both they and their denomination apply to be designated as such. Unlike the Marriage Act, the Civil Union Act does not place any restriction on the religious denominations of legally designated marriage officers. Marriage officers have the same powers, responsibilities and duties under the Civil Union Act as they do under the Marriage Act.

== Amendment ==
The Act originally allowed secular marriage officers to be exempted from performing same-sex marriages on the grounds of conscience, religion or belief. This provision was repealed in October 2020 by the Civil Union Amendment Act, 2020, with exemptions expiring after a two-year transition period. During the transition period every office of the Department of Home Affairs is required to have an official available to perform same-sex marriages.
