= Community property =

Marital property regime

Community property (United States) also called community of property (South Africa) is a marital property regime whereby property acquired during a marriage is considered to be owned by both spouses and subject to division between them in the event of divorce. Conversely, property owned by one spouse before the marriage, along with gifts and inheritances they receive during marriage, are treated as that spouse's separate property in the event of divorce. In some cases, separate property can be "transmuted" into community property, or be included in the marital estate for reasons of equity. Community property can also be relevant in probate law, during the disposition of a will.

The concept of community property originated in civil law jurisdictions but is now also found in some common law jurisdictions. Community property regimes can be found in countries around the world including Sweden, Germany, Italy, France, South Africa and parts of the United States. In civil law countries such as Spain, France and Germany, spouses can generally select one of several matrimonial regimes to divide property, with community property being one option, along with the separate property system and a participation system.

== Variations ==
=== Community of acquests and gains ===
Each spouse owns an undivided half-interest in all property acquired during the marriage, except for property acquired by gift or inheritance during the marriage, which is separate property; or which traces to separate property acquired before the marriage, which remains separate property; or which is acquired during a period when the couple are permanently living separately and apart (e.g., legal separation, actual, or de facto), which is also separate property. This genre of community property is also called "ganancial community property."

- French: communauté réduite aux acquêts
- Spanish: sociedad de gananciales
- Dutch: gemeenschap van aanwinst van goederen
- Dutch: gemeenschap van vruchten en inkomsten
- German: Errungenschaftsgemeinschaft
- Italian: comunione dei beni

=== Community of profit and loss ===
This is similar to the above, but liabilities ("losses") are separate property.

- Dutch: gemeenschap van winst en verlies
- Afrikaans: gemeenskap van wins en verlies

=== Community of personal and marital property ===
Community property consists of all property, personalty and realty, acquired during the marriage; and all personalty acquired before the marriage. Realty acquired before marriage is separate property.

- French: communauté de meubles et acquêts
- Dutch: gemeenschap van inboedel
- German: Fahrnisgemeinschaft

=== Limited community property ===
Similar to community of acquests and gains but certain marital property is separate property.

- French: communauté de biens limitée
- Dutch: beperkte gemeenschap van goederen
- Swiss Standard German: Ausschlussgemeinschaft

=== Universal or absolute community property ===
All pre-marital and marital property is community property. However, if there are children from a prior marriage, the property associated with that marital community may be segregated from the community property of a subsequent marriage, to ensure the children of the prior spouse have an inheritance.

- French: communauté universelle
- Spanish: comunidad absoluta de bienes
- Dutch: algehele gemeenschap van goederen
- German: allgemeine Gütergemeinschaft
- Italian: comunione universale dei beni

== Jurisdictions ==
=== Russia ===
In Russia, community property was introduced by the Soviet government in 1926. Prior to that, laws evolved by the late 18th century dictated separate property regime, so a married woman was (at least in theory) in full charge of her property, including the dowry and whatever she acquired personally during the marriage. The new Soviet system replaced this with a limited form of community property, namely community of acquisitions, and it survives to the present day. The only significant change, made in 1995, was the introduction of marital agreement which didn't exist under the Soviet law. Such an agreement may be signed at any time before or after conclusion of the marriage. It may regulate the spouses' rights on a basis entirely alien to the statutory regime, but shouldn't put any of them (especially one who cannot provide for themselves) into a clearly unfavorable position.

=== South Africa ===
In South Africa, if a couple does not sign an antenuptial contract, before a notary public, which is subsequently registered at a deeds office, prior to marriage, they are married in community of property, which means that all of their assets and liabilities (even those acquired before the marriage) are merged into a joint estate during their marriage, in which each spouse has an undivided half-share. Each spouse has equal power to deal independently with the estate, except that certain major transactions require the consent of both spouses. One of the consequences of community of property in South Africa is that if one spouse is declared insolvent (bankrupt) during the marriage, the other also becomes insolvent, a potentially devastating consequence.

=== United States ===
Map of the United States with community property states in red. Additionally, Alaska, Florida, Kentucky, and Tennessee are elective community property states, and of the five inhabited US territories, Puerto Rico and Guam are community property jurisdictions.

The United States has nine community property states: Arizona, California, Idaho, Louisiana, Nevada, New Mexico, Texas, Washington, and Wisconsin. Four other states have adopted optional community property systems. Alaska allows spouses to create community property by entering into a community property agreement or by creating a community property trust. In 2010, Tennessee adopted a law similar to Alaska's and allows residents and non-residents to opt into community property through a community property trust. More recently, Kentucky adopted an optional community property system in 2020, allowing residents and non-residents to establish community property trusts. Finally, in 2021 Florida adopted a similar law, allowing citizens and noncitizens to establish community property trusts. The commonwealth of Puerto Rico allows property to be owned as community property also as do several Native American jurisdictions.

Division of community property may take place by item by splitting all items or by values. In some jurisdictions, such as California, a 50/50 division of community property is strictly mandated by statute so the focus then shifts to whether particular items are to be classified as community or separate property. In other jurisdictions, such as Texas, a divorce court may decree an "equitable distribution" of community property, which may result in an unequal division of such. In non-community property states property may be divided by equitable distribution. Generally speaking, the property that each partner brings into the marriage or receives by gift, bequest or devise during marriage is called separate property (not community property). See division of property. Division of community debts may not be the same as division of community property. For example, in California, community property is required to be divided "equally" while community debt is required to be divided "equitably".

== See also ==
- Village green
