= Native Administration Act, 1927 =

South African legislation

Parliament of South Africa
- Long title: Act to provide for the better control and management of native affairs.
- Citation: Act No. 38 of 1927
- Enacted by: Parliament of South Africa
- Royal assent: 30 June 1927
- Commenced: 1 September 1927
- Repealed: 12 April 2006, 30 September 2007, and various other dates
- Administered by: Minister of Native Affairs

Repealed by
- Repeal of the Black Administration Act and Amendment of Certain Laws Act, 2005

Related legislation
- Native Affairs Act, 1920; Bantu Authorities Act, 1951
- Status: Repealed

The Native Administration Act, 1927 (Act No. 38 of 1927), subsequently renamed the Bantu Administration Act, 1927 and the Black Administration Act, 1927, was legislation enacted by the Parliament of the Union of South Africa in 1927. It was repealed in stages from 2006 onwards.

== Description ==
According to the Native Administration Act, 1927, the Governor-General of South Africa could "banish" a "native" or "tribe" from one area to another whenever he deemed this "expedient or in the general public interest". This Act set up a separate legal system for the administration of African law, and made the proclaimed Black areas subject to a separate political regime from the remainder of the country, ultimately subject only to rule by proclamation, not Parliament.

The central imperative behind the Act was to establish a strong enough system of national 'native administration' to contain the political pressures that were likely to result from the legislative measures necessary for the implementation of territorial segregation. It was, together with the Native Affairs Act, 1920, part of a process of transferring power over the regulation of African life from Parliament to the executive.

It also included a clause which stated: "Any person who utters any words or does any other act or thing whatever with intent to promote any feeling of hostility between Natives and Europeans, shall be guilty of an offence and liable on conviction to imprisonment not exceeding one year or to a fine of one hundred pounds or both"; thus it became popularly known as the "hostility law".

== Repeal ==
Many provisions of the act became unconstitutional on the introduction of the Interim Constitution of South Africa on 27 April 1994, which invalidated all laws which unfairly discriminated on the basis of race. On 12 April 2006, the remaining provisions of the act were announced to be repealed "incrementally" by the Repeal of the Black Administration Act and Amendment of Certain Laws Act, 2005.

== See also ==
- Category:Apartheid laws in South Africa
- Apartheid in South Africa
