= Department of Home Affairs (South Africa) =

South African government department

- List: 10 other official names: Departement van Binnelandse Sake (Afrikaans); umNyango wezangeKhaya (Southern Ndebele); iSebe leMicimbi yezeKhaya (Xhosa); uMnyango Wezindaba Zasekhaya (Zulu); Litiko Letasekhaya (Swazi); Kgoro ya Merero ya Legae (Northern Sotho); Lefapha la Merero ya Lehae (Sotho); Lefapha la Merero ya Selegae (Tswana); Ndzawulo ya Xikaya (Tsonga); Muhasho wa zwa Muno (Venda)
- Logo of the department

Department overview
- Formed: May 31, 1910; 116 years ago
- Jurisdiction: Government of South Africa
- Headquarters: Hallmark Building, Corner of Johannes Ramokhoase & Thabo Sehume Street, Pretoria; 25°44′38.22″S 28°11′21.97″E
- Employees: 9,375 (2009)
- Annual budget: R 13.77 billion (2026/27)
- Ministers responsible: Leon Schreiber, Minister of Home Affairs; Njabulo Nzuza, Deputy Minister of Home Affairs
- Department executive: Livhuwani Tommy Makhode, Director-General: Home Affairs
- Website: dha.gov.za

The Department of Home Affairs is a department of the South African government. It is the custodian of the identity of all South African citizens.

Home Affairs is responsible for, among other things, issuing certificates such as those recognizing births and marriages, issuing identity documents and passports, and issuing citizenship, naturalization, and permanent residency certificates.

Furthermore, the department seeks to ensure a responsive and efficient immigration regime, as well as the effective, secure, and humane management of asylum seekers and refugees.

The DHA also receives funds on behalf of the Electoral Commission of South Africa (IEC), and for the Represented Political Parties Fund. The IEC and Government Printing Works (GPW) report to the department.

The department is headed by the Minister of Home Affairs, a role held since 2024 by Democratic Alliance party member Leon Schreiber.

== Documents ==
The department is responsible for:

- Maintenance of the National Population Register (the civil registry), including the recording of births, marriages/civil partnerships and deaths.
- Issuing identity documents and passports.
- Issuing visas for visitors to South Africa (although visa applications pass through embassies or consulates which are part of the Department of International Relations and Cooperation).
- Managing immigration to South Africa and naturalisation of permanent immigrants.
- Handling refugees and asylum seekers in South Africa.
- Controlling ports of entry at land borders, seaports and airports.

== Budget ==
The department was allocated a 2025/26 budget of R11 billion.

== Digitization ==
In February 2026, during the State of the Nation Address (SONA), South African President Cyril Ramaphosa confirmed that a national digital identity system would launch in 2026. Led by the Department of Home Affairs, the new system would form part of the government's unified digital services platform, MyMzansi, and was aimed at reducing the need for in-person visits to government offices.

Among the documents being digitized were South African IDs, driver's licenses, and matric certificates.

In relation to the launch, Home Affairs Minister Leon Schreiber said the first phase of the digitization project would focus on Home Affairs services, with other departments getting on board later. He said Home Affairs was also expanding smart ID and passport services offered through major South African bank branches.

== Criticisms ==
A report by the country's Public Service Commission found that the Department of Home Affairs accounted for 22 of the 260 financial misconduct cases for national departments in 2008/9.

In May 2010 it was reported that the Department of Home Affairs had not paid its bill to the Government Printing Works, leading to a delay in the issuance of new passports, and that the department faced lawsuits from "people erroneously declared dead, people whom they failed to issue with identity documents and others arrested after their IDs were used in a fraudulent manner". In the same year, the department was being sued for R 5 billion for various breaches of terms and contracts.

There have been reports of corruption within Home Affairs. In February 2010 the department closed one of its Johannesburg offices due to corruption, and in the same year, a number of officials and staff members appeared in court for alleged corruption and bribery.

In January 2011 the department was criticised for its inefficiency, particularly in regard to processing documents. Eye Witness News reported that it would take two years to process visa requests from Zimbabwe citizens applying for work and study permits. The Sowetan reported in January 2011 that a South African citizen has unsuccessfully tried to attain an identity document for four years.
